= 2015 Portland Timbers season =

Portland Timbers
2015 season
- President: Merritt Paulson
- Head coach: Caleb Porter
- Stadium: Providence Park; Portland, Oregon (Capacity: 21,144)
- Major League Soccer: Conference: 3rd Overall: 5th
- MLS Cup Playoffs: Winners
- U.S. Open Cup: Fifth round
- Top goalscorer: League: Fanendo Adi (16); All: Fanendo Adi (18)
- Highest home attendance: Regular season: 21,144
- Lowest home attendance: Regular season: 21,144
- Average home league attendance: Regular season: 21,144
Primary colors	Secondary colors	Third colors

The 2015 Portland Timbers season was the 5th season for the Portland Timbers in Major League Soccer (MLS), the top flight professional soccer league in the United States and Canada this season resulted in the Timbers winning the 2015 MLS Cup.

== Competitions ==
Competition	Started round	Final position	First match	Last match	Qualification
2015 MLS Western Conference	MLS 1	3rd Place	March 7, 2015	October 25, 2015	Conference semifinals & 2016–17 CONCACAF Champions League
2015 Supporters' Shield	MLS 1	5th place	March 7, 2015	October 25, 2015	Conference semifinals and 2016–17 CONCACAF Champions League
2015 MLS Cup Playoffs	Knockout	Champions	October 29, 2015	December 6, 2015	2016–17 CONCACAF Champions League
2015 Open Cup	4th Round	5th Round	June 16, 2015	July 1, 2015	2016–17 CONCACAF Champions League
2015–16 CONCACAF Champions League	DNQ	DNQ	DNQ	DNQ	2016 FIFA Club World Cup
Cascadia Cup	MLS 4	3rd Place	March 28, 2015	August 30, 2015	

=== Major League Soccer ===
==== Preseason ====
Desert Friendlies

January 31, 2015	Portland Timbers	2–0	Sporting Kansas City	Tucson, Arizona, U.S.
17:00 (PST)	Villafaña (yellow card) 22'; Fernández 30' (pen.); Nanchoff 53'	Report	Otero (yellow card) 40'	Stadium: Kino Veterans Memorial Stadium

February 7, 2015	Portland Timbers	1–1	Houston Dynamo	Tucson, Arizona, U.S.
18:00 (PST)	Paparatto (yellow card) 56'; Asprilla (yellow card) 63'; Cummings 69'	Report	Davis (yellow card) 20'; Miranda 48'; Johnson (red card) 56'; Cochran (yellow card) 66'	Stadium: Kino Veterans Memorial Stadium

February 10, 2015	Portland Timbers	0–0	San Jose Earthquakes	Tucson, Arizona, U.S.
09:30 (PST)		Report		Stadium: Kino Veterans Memorial Stadium

Simple Invitational

Pos	Team	GP	W	L	D	GF	GA	GD	Pts
1	Vancouver Whitecaps FC	3	2	0	1	5	3	+2	7
2	Portland Timbers	3	1	1	1	2	2	0	4
3	Chicago Fire	3	0	0	3	2	2	0	3
4	Stabæk	3	0	2	1	2	4	-2	1

February 22, 2015	Portland Timbers	0–1	Vancouver Whitecaps FC	Portland, Oregon, U.S.
17:00 (PST)	Wallace (yellow card) 30' (red card) 60'; Ridgewell (yellow card) 54' (red card) 90'; Borchers (yellow card) 80'	Report	Kah (yellow card) 21' (goal) 31'; Waston (yellow card) 66'; Mezquida (yellow card) 88'	Stadium: Providence Park; Attendance: 15,491

February 25, 2015	Portland Timbers	1–1	Chicago Fire	Portland, Oregon, U.S.
19:30 (PST)	Nanchoff 22'; Fochive (yellow card) 30' (red card) 88'; Jeanderson (yellow card) 55'	Report	Amarikwa (yellow card) 5'; Paparatto 44' (o.g.); Ritter (yellow card) 88'	Stadium: Providence Park; Attendance: 10,417

February 28, 2015	Portland Timbers	1–0	Stabæk	Portland, Oregon, U.S.
17:00 (PST)	Adi 31'	Report	Issah (yellow card) 70'	Stadium: Providence Park; Attendance: 15,523

==== MLS regular season ====
March 7, 2015 MLS 1	Portland Timbers	0–0	Real Salt Lake	Portland, Oregon, U.S.
19:30 (PST)	Powell (yellow card) 32'; Ridgewell (yellow card) 57'	Report	Mansally (yellow card) 27'; Gil (yellow card) 45'; Schuler (yellow card) 48'	Stadium: Providence Park; Attendance: 21,144; Referee: Ismail Elfath

March 15, 2015 MLS 2	Portland Timbers	2–2	LA Galaxy	Portland, Oregon, U.S.
16:00 (PST)	Adi 31', 90'	Report	Zardes 65'; Väyrynen (yellow card) 79'; Gargan (yellow card) 88'; Gordon 90+2'	Stadium: Providence Park; Attendance: 21,144; Referee: Hilario Grajeda

March 21, 2015 MLS 3	Sporting Kansas City	0–0	Portland Timbers	Kansas City, Kansas
17:30 (PST)	Feilhaber (yellow card) 82'	Report	Chara (yellow card) 72'	Stadium: Sporting Park; Attendance: 20,848; Referee: Silviu Petrescu

March 28, 2015 MLS 4	Vancouver Whitecaps FC	2–1	Portland Timbers	Vancouver, British Columbia, Canada
17:00 (PST)	Koffie (yellow card) 12'; Mezquida 15'; Beitashour (yellow card) 58'; Waston (yellow card) 87'; Earnshaw 90+1'	Report	Powell (yellow card) 30'; Adi 82'	Stadium: BC Place; Attendance: 22,500; Referee: Allen Chapman

April 4, 2015 MLS 5	Portland Timbers	3–1	FC Dallas	Portland, Oregon, U.S.
19:30 (PST)	Borchers 23'; Urruti 62'; Ridgewell (yellow card) 64'; Chara 87'	Report	Texeira (yellow card) 15'; Akindele 29'; Harris (yellow card) 65'	Stadium: Providence Park; Attendance: 21,144; Referee: Ricardo Salazar

April 12, 2015 MLS 6	Portland Timbers	0–2	Orlando City SC	Portland, Oregon, U.S.
14:00 (PST)	Powell (yellow card) 28'; Chara (yellow card) 45'; Urruti (yellow card) 84'	Report	Larin 30'; Okugo (yellow card) 45+2'; Shea (yellow card) 82'; Kaká 85' (pen.)	Stadium: Providence Park; Attendance: 21,144; Referee: Kevin Stott

April 19, 2015 MLS 7	New York City FC	0–1	Portland Timbers	New York City, New York, U.S.
17:00 (PST)		Report	Powell (yellow card) 68'; Asprilla 79'	Stadium: Yankee Stadium; Attendance: 21,891; Referee: Armando Villarreal

April 26, 2015 MLS 8	Seattle Sounders FC	1–0	Portland Timbers	Seattle, Washington, U.S.
18:30 (PST)	Pappa (yellow card) 53'; Alonso (yellow card) 54'; Dempsey 77'	Report	Villafaña (yellow card) 23'; Ridgewell (yellow card) 71'	Stadium: CenturyLink Field; Attendance: 41,451; Referee: Alan Kelly

May 2, 2015 MLS 9	Portland Timbers	0–0	Vancouver Whitecaps FC	Portland, Oregon, U.S.
19:30 (PST)	Wallace (yellow card) 44'	Report	Sampson (yellow card) 19'; Kah (yellow card) 57'	Stadium: Providence Park; Attendance: 21,144; Referee: Allen Chapman

May 9, 2015 MLS 10	Montreal Impact	1–2	Portland Timbers	Montreal, Quebec, Canada
13:00 (PST)	Oduro 71'; Piatti (yellow card) 78'	Report	Borchers 64'; Valeri 70'	Stadium: Saputo Stadium; Attendance: 13,020; Referee: Mark Geiger

May 16, 2015 MLS 11	Houston Dynamo	3–1	Portland Timbers	Houston, Texas, U.S.
17:30 (PST)	Bruin 9', 83'; Barnes (yellow card) 45+1' (goal) 75'	Report	Jewsbury (yellow card) 12'; Adi (yellow card) 14' (goal) 48'; Chara (yellow card) 42'; Powell (yellow card) 84'	Stadium: BBVA Compass Stadium; Attendance: 20,844; Referee: Edvin Jurisevic

May 23, 2015 MLS 12	Toronto FC	1–0	Portland Timbers	Toronto, Ontario, Canada
14:00 (PST)	Giovinco 5'; Morgan (yellow card) 90'	Report	Chara (yellow card) 90+2'	Stadium: BMO Field; Attendance: 23,569; Referee: Jorge Gonzalez

May 27, 2015 MLS 13	Portland Timbers	1–0	D.C. United	Portland, Oregon, U.S.
19:30 (PST)	Urruti 5'; Paparatto (yellow card) 56'; Chara (yellow card) 76'	Report	Jeffrey (yellow card) 30'; Boswell (yellow card) 90+2'	Stadium: Providence Park; Attendance: 21,144; Referee: Chris Penso

May 30, 2015 MLS 14	Colorado Rapids	1–2	Portland Timbers	Commerce City, Colorado, U.S.
18:00 (PST)	Cronin (yellow card) 44' (goal) 89'; Riley (yellow card) 46'; Sjöberg (yellow card) 59'	Report	Fernández 38'; Jewsbury (yellow card) 42' (goal) 90+3'	Stadium: Dick's Sporting Goods Park; Attendance: 18,209; Referee: Drew Fischer

June 6, 2015 MLS 15	Portland Timbers	2–0	New England Revolution	Portland, Oregon, U.S.
19:30 (PST)	Villafaña (yellow card) 7'; Urruti (yellow card) 39'; Adi 86', 89'; Wallace (yellow card) 88'	Report	Bunbury (yellow card) 7'; Woodberry (yellow card) 45'; Nguyen (yellow card) 85'; Alston (yellow card) 90+3'	Stadium: Providence Park; Attendance: 21,144; Referee: Jose Carlos Rivero

June 20, 2015 MLS 16	Portland Timbers	2–0	Houston Dynamo	Portland, Oregon, U.S.
19:30 (PST)	Urruti 34'; Chara (yellow card) 54'; Fernandez 61' (pen.)	Report	Horst (yellow card) 59'; Garrido (yellow card) 70'	Stadium: Providence Park; Attendance: 21,144; Referee: Baldomero Toledo

June 24, 2015 MLS 17	LA Galaxy	5–0	Portland Timbers	Carson, California, U.S.
20:00 (PST)	Lletget 13'; Keane 18' (pen.); Rogers 33', (yellow card) 65'; Juninho 72'; Gordon (yellow card) 78'; Villareal 88'	Report	Ridgewell (red card) 78'	Stadium: StubHub Center; Attendance: 21,207; Referee: Ted Unkel

June 28, 2015 MLS 18	Portland Timbers	4–1	Seattle Sounders FC	Portland, Oregon, U.S.
16:00 (PST)	Nagbe 12'; Valeri (yellow card) 53'; Adi 74', 76'; Wallace 90+1'	Report	Pineda (yellow card) 17'; Neagle 38' (yellow card) 71'; Rose (yellow card) 52'	Stadium: Providence Park; Attendance: 21,144; Referee: Jair Marrufo

July 5, 2015 MLS 19	Portland Timbers	1–0	San Jose Earthquakes	Portland, Oregon, U.S.
14:00 (PST)	Jewsbury 90+1'	Report	Goodson (yellow card) 51'; Sherrod (yellow card) 75'	Stadium: Providence Park; Attendance: 21,144; Referee: Ricardo Salazar

July 11, 2015 MLS 20	Philadelphia Union	3–0	Portland Timbers	Chester, PA, U.S.
16:00 (PST)	Edu (yellow card) 35'; Le Toux (yellow card) 64'; Wenger 69'; Nogueira 71', 82'	Report	Valeri (yellow card) 86'	Stadium: PPL Park; Attendance: 18,722; Referee: Jose Carlos Rivero

July 18, 2015 MLS 21	Portland Timbers	1–1	Vancouver Whitecaps FC	Portland, Oregon, U.S.
19:30 (PST)	Valeri 33'; Ridgewell (yellow card) 36'; Chara (yellow card) 47'; Wallace (yellow card) 90+3'; Johnson (yellow card) 90+5' (red card) 90+5'	Report	Parker (yellow card) 22'; Laba 57'; Harvey (red card) 90+2'	Stadium: Providence Park; Attendance: 21,144; Referee: Juan Guzman

July 25, 2015 MLS 22	FC Dallas	4–1	Portland Timbers	Frisco, Texas, U.S.
18:00 (PST)	Barrios 12', 22'; Hollingshead (yellow card) 65'; Acosta 69'; Harris (yellow card) 74'; Diaz 87' (pen.)		Adi 90+3' (pen.)	Stadium: Toyota Stadium; Attendance: 15,992; Referee: Ismail Elfath

August 2, 2015 MLS 23	San Jose Earthquakes	0–0	Portland Timbers	San Jose, California, U.S.
14:00 (PST)	Francis (yellow card) 14'; Stewart (yellow card) 88'	Report		Stadium: Avaya Stadium; Attendance: 18,000; Referee: Kevin Stott

August 7, 2015 MLS 24	Portland Timbers	1–0	Chicago Fire	Portland, Oregon, U.S.
20:00 (PST)	Adi 48'; Melano (yellow card) 71'	Report	Polster (yellow card) 44'	Stadium: Providence Park; Attendance: 21,144; Referee: Armando Villarreal

August 15, 2015 MLS 25	Real Salt Lake	0–1	Portland Timbers	Sandy, Utah, U.S.
19:00 (PST)	Phillips (yellow card) 12'	Report	Ridgewell (yellow card) 80'; Borchers 90+5'	Stadium: Rio Tinto Stadium; Attendance: 20,338; Referee: Drew Fischer

August 21, 2015 MLS 26	Portland Timbers	2–2	Houston Dynamo	Portland, Oregon, U.S.
20:00 (PST)	Nagbe 76'; Melano 86'; Chara (red card) 90+1'	Report	Garcia (yellow card) 32' (goal) 40'; Bruin 45'	Stadium: Providence Park; Attendance: 21,144; Referee: Ricardo Salazar

August 30, 2015 MLS 27	Seattle Sounders FC	2–1	Portland Timbers	Seattle, Washington, U.S.
14:00 (PST)	Martins 6'; Evans (yellow card) 24' (goal) 42' (pen.); Oniel Fisher (yellow card) 61'	Report	Ridgewell (yellow card) 44'; Jewsbury 58'; Valeri (yellow card) 69'; Asprilla (yellow card) 83'	Stadium: CenturyLink Field; Attendance: 64,358; Referee: Alan Kelly

September 9, 2015 MLS 28	Portland Timbers	0–0	Sporting Kansas City	Portland, Oregon, U.S.
19:30 (PST)	Melano (yellow card) 45+1'	Report	Nagamura (yellow card) 40'; Peterson (yellow card) 45+3'; Feilhaber (yellow card) 68'; Anor (yellow card) 90+4'	Stadium: Providence Park; Attendance: 21,144; Referee: Fotis Bazakos

September 20, 2015 MLS 29	Portland Timbers	0–2	New York Red Bulls	Portland, Oregon, U.S.
14:00 (PST)	Melano (yellow card) 8'	Report	Felipe 43'; Perrinelle 45+2'	Stadium: Providence Park; Attendance: 21,144; Referee: Drew Fischer

September 26, 2015 MLS 30	Columbus Crew	1–2	Portland Timbers	Columbus, Ohio, U.S.
16:30 (PST)	Kamara 43'; Higuain (yellow card) 88'	Report	Adi 28', 50'; Chara (yellow card) 45+1'; Fochive (yellow card) 90+2'; Kwarasey (yellow card) 90+5'	Stadium: Columbus Crew Stadium; Attendance: 22,719; Referee: Silviu Petrescu

October 3, 2015 MLS 31	Portland Timbers	0–1	Sporting Kansas City	Portland, Oregon, U.S.
19:30 (PST)	Adi (yellow card) 70'; Valeri (yellow card) 80'	Report	Feilhaber (yellow card) 74'; Németh 83'; Melia (yellow card) 88'	Stadium: Providence Park; Attendance: 21,144; Referee: Ismail Elfath

October 14, 2015 MLS 32	Real Salt Lake	0–1	Portland Timbers	Sandy, Utah, U.S.
18:30 (PST)	Olave (red card) 52'; Glad (yellow card) 81'	Report	Powell (yellow card) 28'; Adi 54' (pen.); Fochive (yellow card) 72'; Urruti (yellow card) 89'	Stadium: Rio Tinto Stadium; Attendance: 19,457; Referee: Juan Guzman

October 18, 2015 MLS 33	LA Galaxy	2–5	Portland Timbers	Carson, California, U.S.
16:00 (PST)	Keane 36', 84'; Gargan (yellow card) 67'; Leonardo (yellow card) 77'	Report	Adi 65', 68' (pen.); Chara 74'; Villafaña (yellow card) 81'; Nagbe 85'; Urruti 90'	Stadium: StubHub Center; Attendance: 27,000; Referee: Alan Kelly

October 25, 2015 MLS 34	Portland Timbers	4–1	Colorado Rapids	Portland, Oregon, U.S.
16:00 (PST)	Nagbe 5', 33'; Powell (yellow card) 24'; Melano (yellow card) 53'; Villafaña 63'; Adi 88'	Report	Badji 13'; Powers (yellow card) 40'; Pittinari (yellow card) 44'	Stadium: Providence Park; Attendance: 21,144; Referee: Baldomero Toledo

==== MLS Cup Playoffs ====
October 29, 2015 Knockout Round	Portland Timbers	2–2 (a.e.t.) (7–6 p)	Sporting Kansas City	Portland, Oregon, U.S.
19:00 (PST)	Ridgewell (yellow card) 38'; Wallace 57'; Wallace (yellow card) 69'; Fochive (yellow card) 107'; Valeri (yellow card) 115'; Urruti 118'	Report	Ellis (yellow card) 11'; Dwyer (yellow card) 35'; Németh (yellow card) 76'; Dia (yellow card) 76'; Ellis 87'; Abdul-Salaam (yellow card) 93'; Németh 96'	Stadium: Providence Park; Attendance: 21,144; Referee: Armando Villarreal
	Penalties
	Valeri (penalty missed); Borchers (penalty scored); Ridgewell (penalty scored); Jewsbury (penalty missed); Urruti (penalty scored); Villafaña (penalty missed); Asprilla (penalty scored); Nagbe (penalty scored); Powell (penalty missed); Fochive (penalty scored); Kawarsey (penalty scored)		(penalty scored) Feilhaber; (penalty missed) Dwyer; (penalty scored) Zusi; (penalty missed) Besler; (penalty scored) Nagamura; (penalty missed) Ellis; (penalty scored) Mustivar; (penalty scored) Peterson; (penalty missed) Abdul-Salaam; (penalty scored) Dia; (penalty missed) Kempin

November 01, 2015 Semi-Finals Leg 1	Portland Timbers	0–0	Vancouver Whitecaps FC	Portland, Oregon, U.S.
14:00 (PST)	Melano (yellow card) 44'	Report	Koffie (yellow card) 45'	Stadium: Providence Park; Attendance: 21,144; Referee: Allen Chapman

November 08, 2015 Semi-Finals Leg 2	Vancouver Whitecaps FC	0–2	Portland Timbers	Vancouver, BC, Canada
19:00 (PST)	Rivero (yellow card) 55'; Beitashour (yellow card) 72'	Report	Adi 31'; Wallace (yellow card) 60'; Valeri (yellow card) 62'; Chara 90+4'	Stadium: BC Place; Attendance: 27,837; Referee: Ismail Elfath

November 22, 2015 Conference finals Leg 1	Portland Timbers	3–1	FC Dallas	Portland, Oregon, U.S.
16:30 (PST)	Ridgewell 23'; Villafaña (yellow card) 38'; Asprilla 53'; Chara (yellow card) 78'; Borchers 90+1'	Report	Texeira 62'; Acosta (yellow card) 86'	Stadium: Providence Park; Attendance: 21,144; Referee: Ted Unkel

November 29, 2015 Conference finals Leg 2	FC Dallas	2–2	Portland Timbers	Frisco, Texas, U.S.
14:00 (PST)	Hollingshead 68'; Pérez 73'; Acosta (yellow card) 80'	Report	Adi 54'; Chara (yellow card) 72'; Melano 90+5'	Stadium: Toyota Stadium; Attendance: 20,966; Referee: Ismail Elfath

December 06, 2015 MLS Cup	Columbus Crew	1–2	Portland Timbers	Columbus, Ohio, U.S.
13:00 (PST)	Kamara 18'; Afful (yellow card) 34'	Report	Valeri 1'; Wallace 7'; Powell (yellow card) 65'; Valeri (yellow card) 90+3'; Asprilla (yellow card) 90+3'	Stadium: Mapfre Stadium; Attendance: 21,747; Referee: Jair Marrufo

==== Standings ====
===== Western Conference standings =====
Pos	Team	Pld	W	L	T	GF	GA	GD	Pts	Qualification
1	FC Dallas	34	18	10	6	52	39	+13	60	MLS Cup Conference Semifinals
2	Vancouver Whitecaps FC	34	16	13	5	45	36	+9	53	MLS Cup Conference Semifinals
3	Portland Timbers	34	15	11	8	41	39	+2	53	MLS Cup Knockout Round
4	Seattle Sounders FC	34	15	13	6	44	36	+8	51	MLS Cup Knockout Round
5	LA Galaxy	34	14	11	9	56	46	+10	51	MLS Cup Knockout Round

Source: MLS

===== Overall standings =====
Pos	Team	Pld	W	L	T	GF	GA	GD	Pts	Qualification
3	Vancouver Whitecaps FC	34	16	13	5	45	36	+9	53	CONCACAF Champions League
4	Columbus Crew	34	15	11	8	58	53	+5	53	
5	Portland Timbers (C)	34	15	11	8	41	39	+2	53	CONCACAF Champions League
6	Seattle Sounders FC	34	15	13	6	44	36	+8	51	
7	Montreal Impact	34	15	13	6	48	44	+4	51	

Source: MLS
Rules for classification: 1) points; 2) total wins; 3) total goal differential; 4) total goals scored
(C) MLS Cup Champion

=== U.S. Open Cup ===
June 16 Fourth round	Seattle Sounders FC (Washington (state))	1–3 (a.e.t.)	(Oregon) Portland Timbers	Tukwila, Washington, U.S.
	Rose (yellow card) 20'; Evans (yellow card) 39' (yellow-red card) 69'; Martins 79'; Azira (red card) 113'; Dempsey (yellow card) 113' (red card) 114'	Report; Box Score	Valeri 48'; Paparatto (yellow card) 55'; Wallace 100'; Jewsbury (yellow card) 106'; Peay (yellow card) 111'; Urruti 116'	Stadium: Starfire Sports Complex; Attendance: 4,022; Referee: Daniel Radford

July 1 Fifth round	Real Salt Lake (Utah)	2–0	(Oregon) Portland Timbers	Sandy, Utah, U.S.
	Jaime 54'; Morales 71' (pen.)	Report; Box Score		Stadium: Rio Tinto Stadium; Attendance: 15,840; Referee: Jose Carlos Rivero

=== Cascadia Cup ===
The Cascadia Cup is a trophy that was created in 2004 by supporters of the Portland Timbers, Seattle Sounders FC and Vancouver Whitecaps FC. It is awarded to the club with the best record in league games versus the other participants.

2015
Team	Pld	W	L	D	GF	GA	GD	Pts
Seattle Sounders FC	6	4	2	0	9	8	+1	12
Vancouver Whitecaps FC	6	2	2	2	6	7	−1	8
Portland Timbers	6	1	3	2	7	7	0	5

Source: "Cascadia Cup". cascadiacup.soccer. January 2015.

=== Friendlies ===
No Friendlies in 2015.

== Club ==
=== Kits ===
Primary	Primary Alt.	Secondary	Secondary Alt.	Third

Type	Shirt	Shorts	Socks
Primary	Green / White	White	Green
Primary Alt.	Green / White	Green	Green
Secondary	Red / Black	Red	Red
Secondary Alt.	Red / Black	Black	Red
Third	Dark green	Dark green	Dark Green

=== Executive staff ===
Majority Owner & President	Merritt Paulson
Chief Operating Officer	Mike Golub
General Manager / Technical Director	Gavin Wilkinson
Ground (capacity and dimensions)	Providence Park (20,438 / 110x70 yards)

Updated to match played January 23, 2012
Source: Portland Timbers

=== Coaching staff ===
Position	Staff
Head Coach	Caleb Porter
Assistant Coach	Pablo Moreira
Assistant Coach	Sean McAuley
Assistant Coach	Cameron Knowles
Assistant Coach/Portland Timbers 2 Head Coach	Jay Vidovich
Goalkeeping Coach	Mike Toshack
Head Athletic Trainer	Nik Wald

Last updated: February 5, 2015
Source: Portland Timbers

== Squad ==
=== Roster and statistics ===
All players contracted to the club during the season included.

No.	Pos.	Nat.	Player	Total App	Total	Total (yellow card)	Total (red card)	MLS App.	MLS	MLS (yellow card)	MLS (red card)	Open Cup App.	Open Cup	Open Cup (yellow card)	Open Cup (red card)
2	DF	(Jamaica)	Alvas Powell	19	0	5	0	18	0	5	0	1	0	0	0
4	MF	(Canada)	Will Johnson	3	0	0	0	3	0	0	0	0	0	0	0
6	FW	(Liberia)	Darlington Nagbe	19	1	0	0	18	1	0	0	1	0	0	0
7	DF	(United States)	Nat Borchers	17	2	0	0	16	2	0	0	1	0	0	0
8	MF	(Argentina)	Diego Valeri	8	2	1	0	7	1	1	0	1	1	0	0
9	FW	(Nigeria)	Fanendo Adi	19	8	1	0	18	8	1	0	1	0	0	0
10	FW	(Argentina)	Gastón Fernández	2	0	0	0	1	0	0	0	1	0	0	0
11	MF	(Colombia)	Dairon Asprilla	8	1	0	0	8	1	0	0	0	0	0	0
12	GK	(Norway)	Adam Larsen Kwarasey	19	0	0	0	18	0	0	0	1	0	0	0
13	MF	(United States)	Jack Jewsbury	17	1	3	0	16	1	2	0	1	0	1	0
14	MF	(United States)	Ben Zemanski	0	0	0	0	0	0	0	0	0	0	0	0
15	DF	(Brazil)	Jeanderson	2	0	0	0	2	0	0	0	0	0	0	0
17	MF	(United States)	Michael Nanchoff	5	2	0	0	5	2	0	0	0	0	0	0
18	FW	(Ghana)	Ishmael Yartey	5	0	0	0	5	0	0	0	0	0	0	0
19	DF	(United States)	Jorge Villafaña	19	0	2	0	18	0	2	0	1	0	0	0
20	DF	(United States)	Taylor Peay	9	0	1	0	9	0	1	0	0	0	0	0
21	MF	(Colombia)	Diego Chará	16	1	6	0	16	1	6	0	0	0	0	0
22	MF	(Costa Rica)	Rodney Wallace	16	2	2	0	15	1	2	0	1	1	0	0
23	DF	(Argentina)	Norberto Paparatto	2	0	1	0	1	0	0	0	1	0	1	0
24	DF	(England)	Liam Ridgewell	17	0	3	1	17	0	3	1	0	0	0	0
26	MF	(United States)	George Fochive	3	0	1	0	2	0	1	0	1	0	0	0
32	FW	(Zimbabwe)	Schillo Tshuma	9	0	1	0	9	0	1	0	0	0	0	0
33	GK	(United States)	Andrew Weber	1	0	0	0	1	0	0	0	0	0	0	0
37	FW	(Argentina)	Maximiliano Urruti	19	4	2	0	18	3	2	0	1	1	0	0
90	GK	(New Zealand)	Jake Gleeson	0	0	0	0	0	0	0	0	0	0	0	0
			Own goals for	0	0	0	0	0	0	0	0	0	0	0	0

=== Player movement ===
==== Transfers in ====
Date	Player	Pos	Previous club	Fee/notes	Ref
December 8, 2014	(Norway) Adam Larsen Kwarasey	GK	(Norway) Strømsgodset		
December 8, 2014	(Colombia) Dairon Asprilla	MF	(Colombia) Alianza Petrolera		
December 8, 2014	(Jamaica) Alvas Powell	DF	(Jamaica) Portmore United F.C.		
December 8, 2014	(United States) Nat Borchers	DF	(United States) Real Salt Lake		
December 8, 2014	(Brazil) Jeanderson	DF	(Brazil) Santa Rita		
July 17, 2015	(Argentina) Lucas Melano	FW	(Argentina) Lanús		
August 6, 2015	(Jamaica) Michael Seaton	FW	(United States) D.C. United		

==== Loans in ====
Date	Player	Pos	Previous club	Fee/notes	Ref
March 26, 2015	(Ghana) Ishmael Yartey	FW	(Switzerland) FC Sion		

==== Loans out ====
Date	Player	Pos	Destination club	Fee/notes	Ref
January 8, 2015	(England) Liam Ridgewell	DF	(England) Wigan Athletic	Short Term Loan	

==== Transfers out ====
Date	Player	Pos	Destination club	Fee/notes	Ref
October 29, 2014	(Democratic Republic of the Congo) Steve Zakuani	MF	Retired		
December 8, 2014	(United States) Michael Harrington	DF	(United States) Colorado Rapids	Exchanged for allocation money	
December 8, 2014	(Ghana) Kalif Alhassan	MF	N/A	Option declined	
December 8, 2014	(United States) Steven Evans	MF	(United States) Portland Timbers 2	Option Declined	
December 8, 2014	(United States) Bryan Gallego	DF	N/A	Option declined	
December 8, 2014	(Norway) Pa Modou Kah	DF	(Canada) Vancouver Whitecaps FC	Option declined	
December 8, 2014	(Colombia) José Adolfo Valencia	FW	(Argentina) Club Olimpo	Sold following loan	
December 8, 2014	(United States) Rauwshan McKenzie	DF	N/A	Out of contract	
December 8, 2014	(United States) Danny O'Rourke	DF	N/A	Out of contract	
December 10, 2014	(Jamaica) Donovan Ricketts	GK	(United States) Orlando City SC	Selected 1st in the Expansion Draft	
July 20, 2015	(Zimbabwe) Schillo Tshuma	FW	(United States) Arizona United	Waived	
August 3, 2015	(Argentina) Gastón Fernández	FW	(Argentina) Estudiantes LP	Mutual Termination	

==== 2015 MLS SuperDraft picks ====
Round (overall pick)	Player	Pos	Previous club	Ref
1 (5)	(United States) Nick Besler	MF	University of Notre Dame	
2 (24)	(United States) Andy Thoma	DF	University of Washington	
2 (32)	(United States) Christian Volesky	FW	Southern Illinois University Edwardsville	
2 (34)	(United States) Kharlton Belmar	FW	Virginia Commonwealth University	
3 (52)	(United States) Anthony Manning	DF	Saint Louis University	
4 (84)	(United States) Seth Casiple	MF	University of California	
