= 2014 Portland Timbers season =

Portland Timbers
2014 season
- President: Merritt Paulson
- Head coach: Caleb Porter
- Stadium: Providence Park; Portland, Oregon (Capacity: 20,674)
- Major League Soccer: Conference: 6th Overall: 11th
- U.S. Open Cup: Quarterfinals
- CCL: Group stage
- Top goalscorer: League: Diego Valeri (11); All: Diego Valeri (11)
- Highest home attendance: Regular season: 20,814; Open Cup: 10,619
- Lowest home attendance: Regular season: 20,674; Open Cup: 10,619
- Average home league attendance: Regular Season: 20,744; Open Cup: 10,619
Home colors	Secondary colors	Third colors

The 2014 Portland Timbers season was the 4th season for the Portland Timbers in Major League Soccer (MLS), the top flight professional soccer league in the United States and Canada.

== Background ==
The Timbers finished the 2013 season in 1st place in the Western Conference, however it wasn't until December 13, 2013, that it was announced they would be playing in the 2014-15 CONCACAF Champions League due to a rule change. Replacing the MLS Cup runner-up, the top team in the non-Supporter Shield conference would get the spot in Champions League.

The Timbers announced they would be partnering with the San Jose Earthquakes and USL Pro team Sacramento Republic FC on January 23. The Timbers will send 2 players on loan to Sacramento Republic and not participate in the MLS Reserve League.

== Competitions ==
Competition	Started round	Final position	First match	Last match
2014 MLS	–	11th	March 8, 2014	October 25, 2014
2014 MLS Cup	DNQ	DNQ	DNQ	DNQ
2014 Open Cup	4th Round	Quarterfinals	June 17, 2014	July 9, 2014
2014–15 CCL	Group stage	2nd in group	August 19, 2014	October 21, 2014
Cascadia Cup	–	3rd	April 5, 2014	September 20, 2014

=== Major League Soccer ===
==== Preseason ====
Desert Friendlies

February 1, 2014	Portland Timbers	1–1	Sporting Kansas City	Tucson, Arizona, U.S.
17:00 (PST)	Fernández (yellow card) 36'; Danso (yellow card) 75'; Tshuma 84'; Nanchoff (yellow card) 88'	Report	Collin (yellow card) 13' (yellow-red card) 33'; Schmetz (yellow card) 22'; Zizzo 31'	Stadium: Kino Veterans Memorial Stadium

February 5, 2014	Portland Timbers	2–0	Houston Dynamo	Tucson, Arizona, U.S.
16:00 (PST)	Johnson 80'; Urruti 83'	Report		Stadium: Kino Veterans Memorial Stadium

February 8, 2014	Portland Timbers	0–0	Seattle Sounders FC	Tucson, Arizona, U.S.
17:00 (PST)	Kah (yellow card) 26'; Powell (yellow card) 49'; Danso (yellow card) 81'	Report	Bowen (yellow card) 30'; Yedlin (yellow card) 41'	Stadium: Kino Veterans Memorial Stadium

February 12, 2014	Portland Timbers	1–0	Indy Eleven (NASL)	Tucson, Arizona, U.S.
17:00 (PST)	Zemanski 75'	Report		Stadium: Kino Veterans Memorial Stadium

Rose City Invitational

Pos	Team	GP	W	L	D	GF	GA	GD	Pts
1	Vancouver Whitecaps FC	3	2	0	1	8	2	+6	7
2	San Jose Earthquakes	3	2	1	0	2	2	0	6
3	Portland Timbers	3	0	1	2	2	3	−1	2
4	Portmore United F.C.	3	0	2	1	2	7	−5	1

February 23, 2014	Portland Timbers	0–1	San Jose Earthquakes	Portland, Oregon, U.S.
17:00 (PST)	Paparatto (yellow card) 60'	Report	Paparatto 26' (o.g.); Cronin (yellow card) 37'; Bernárdez (yellow card) 49'; Harris (yellow card) 56'; Stephenson (yellow card) 83'	Stadium: Providence Park; Attendance: 13,503

February 26, 2014	Portland Timbers	1–1	Portmore United F.C.	Portland, Oregon, U.S.
19:30 (PST)	Nanchoff 75'	Report	D. Williams (yellow card) 53'; Swaby 82' (pen.); Currie (yellow card) 86'	Stadium: Providence Park; Attendance: 10,091

March 1, 2014	Portland Timbers	1–1	Vancouver Whitecaps FC	Portland, Oregon, U.S.
17:00 (PST)	Johnson 3'; Kah (yellow card) 57'	Report	Reo-Coker (yellow card) 57'; Fernández 79' (pen.)	Stadium: Providence Park; Attendance: 13,779

==== MLS regular season ====
March 8, 2014 MLS 1	Portland Timbers	1–1	Philadelphia Union	Portland, Oregon, U.S.
19:30(PDT)	Chará (yellow card) 88'; Fernández 90+4'	Report	Fabinho (yellow card) 15'; McInerney (yellow card) 59' (goal) 64'; Gaddis (yellow card) 75'	Stadium: Providence Park; Attendance: 20,674; Referee: Ioannis Stavridis

March 16, 2014 MLS 2	Portland Timbers	1–1	Chicago Fire	Portland, Oregon, U.S.
12:00(PDT)	Fernández 79'; Paparatto (yellow card) 90+1'	Report	Larentowicz 19' (pen.); Soumaré (yellow card) 25'; Palmer (yellow card) 43'; Amarikwa (yellow card) 61'; Nyarko (yellow card) 73' (yellow-red card) 86'	Stadium: Providence Park; Attendance: 20,814; Referee: Marcos de Oliveira

March 22, 2014 MLS 3	Colorado Rapids	2–0	Portland Timbers	Commerce City, Colorado, U.S.
15:00(PDT)	Powers (yellow card) 65'; Sánchez 73' (pen.); Brown 75'; José Mari (yellow card) 84' (yellow-red card) 90'	Report	Ricketts (red card) 71'; Weber (yellow card) 74'	Stadium: Dick's Sporting Goods Park; Attendance: 15,135; Referee: Mark Geiger

March 29, 2014 MLS 4	FC Dallas	2–1	Portland Timbers	Frisco, Texas, U.S.
17:30(PDT)	Castillo (yellow card) 10'; Pérez (yellow card) 17' (goal) 45'; Watson (red card) 40'; Díaz 84'; Acosta (yellow card) 88'	Report	Paparatto (yellow card) 3'; Harrington (red card) 39'; Hedges 66' (o.g.); Alhassan (yellow card) 67'; Kah (yellow card) 90+3'	Stadium: Toyota Stadium; Attendance: 16,045; Referee: Sorin Stoica

April 5, 2014 MLS 5 Cascadia Cup	Portland Timbers	4–4	Seattle Sounders FC	Portland, Oregon, U.S.
12:00(PDT)	Chará 9', 55' (yellow card) 50'; Valeri 14'; Kah (yellow card) 33'; Johnson (yellow card) 35'; Urruti 57'; Paparatto (yellow card) 66'	Report	Cooper 3'; Azira (yellow card) 5'; Dempsey 24', 85', 87' (pen.); Pineda (yellow card) 29'; Yedlin (yellow card) 70'	Stadium: Providence Park; Attendance: 20,814; Referee: Hilario Grajeda

April 12, 2014 MLS 6	Portland Timbers	1–1	Chivas USA	Portland, Oregon, U.S.
19:30(PDT)	Johnson 7'; Harrington (yellow card) 39'; Chará (yellow card) 68'	Report	Avila (yellow card) 67'; Torres 79'; Alvarez (yellow card) 85'	Stadium: Providence Park; Attendance: 20,814; Referee: Baldomero Toledo

April 19, 2014 MLS 7	Real Salt Lake	1–0	Portland Timbers	Sandy, Utah, U.S.
18:30(PDT)	Grabavoy 78'	Report	Danso (yellow card) 33'	Stadium: Rio Tinto Stadium; Attendance: 20,496; Referee: Drew Fischer

April 27, 2014 MLS 8	Houston Dynamo	1–1	Portland Timbers	Houston, Texas, U.S.
12:00(PDT)	Bruin 16'; Taylor (yellow card) 40'	Report	Fernández 33'	Stadium: BBVA Compass Stadium; Attendance: 20,558; Referee: Dave Gantar

May 3, 2014 MLS 9	Portland Timbers	3–2	D.C. United	Portland, Oregon, U.S.
19:30(PDT)	Fernández 1'; Danso 38'; Urruti 90+4'	Report	Arnaud 21'; Danso 78' (o.g.); Espíndola (yellow card) 88'	Stadium: Providence Park; Attendance: 20,814; Referee: Ricardo Salazar

May 11, 2014 MLS 10	Portland Timbers	1–1	LA Galaxy	Portland, Oregon, U.S.
11:30(PDT)	Fernández (yellow card) 35'; Valeri 90+5'	Report	Gargan (yellow card) 58'; Keane 90+2'	Stadium: Providence Park; Attendance: 20,814; Referee: Armando Villarreal

May 17, 2014 MLS 11	Portland Timbers	3–3	Columbus Crew	Portland, Oregon, U.S.
19:30(PDT)	Urruti 8'; Powell (red card) 34'; Johnson 80'; Fernández 85'	report	Higuaín 14', 45+5' (yellow card) 40'; Williams (yellow card) 34'; Clark (yellow card) 78'; Finlay 81'; Arrieta (yellow card) 85'	Stadium: Providence Park; Attendance: 20,814; Referee: José Carlos Rivero

May 24, 2014 MLS 12	New York Red Bulls	1–2	Portland Timbers	Harrison, New Jersey, U.S.
16:00(PDT)	Wright-Phillips 36' (pen.); Sam (yellow card) 64'; Olave (yellow card) 68'; Armando (yellow card) 71'; Alexander (yellow card) 83'	report	Zemanski (yellow card) 15'; Urruti 45', 74'; Kah (yellow card) 46'; Johnson (yellow card) 57'; McKenzie (yellow card) 72'	Stadium: Red Bull Arena; Attendance: 19,513; Referee: Drew Fischer

May 28, 2014 MLS 13	Chivas USA	0–2	Portland Timbers	Carson, California, U.S.
19:30(PDT)	Delgado (yellow card) 10'; Pelletieri (yellow card) 28'; Burling (red card) 84'; Alvarez (yellow card) 87'	report	O'Rourke (yellow card) 8'; Adi 65', 71'; McKenzie (yellow card) 90+3'	Stadium: StubHub Center; Attendance: 3,702; Referee: Edvin Jurisevic

June 1, 2014 MLS 14 Cascadia Cup	Portland Timbers	3–4	Vancouver Whitecaps FC	Portland, Oregon, U.S.
18:00(PDT)	Urruti 3'; Kah (yellow card) 45'; Fernández 77'; Johnson 86'	report	Morales 16' (pen.), 26' (pen.) (yellow card) 90+3'; Manneh (yellow card) 28'; Fernández (yellow card) 45'; Hurtado 45+4'; Harvey 49'	Stadium: Providence Park; Attendance: 20,814; Referee: Kevin Stott

June 7, 2014 MLS 15	Real Salt Lake	1–3	Portland Timbers	Sandy, Utah, U.S.
19:00(PDT)	Mulholland 23' (yellow card) 84'; Beltran (yellow card) 53' (yellow-red card) 54'; García (yellow card) 70'	report	Adi 36', 45'; Johnson 73' (pen.); Chará (yellow card) 90+1'	Stadium: Rio Tinto Stadium; Attendance: 20,481; Referee: Ismail Elfath

June 11, 2014 MLS 16	Portland Timbers	2–2	FC Dallas	Portland, Oregon, U.S.
19:00(PDT)	Adi (yellow card) 54'; Johnson 79' (pen.); Kah 90+4'	report	Castillo 27'; Pérez 39' (yellow card) 90' (red card) 90+2'; Keel (yellow card) 60'; Fernández (yellow card) 77'; Hernandez (red card) 87'	Stadium: Providence Park; Attendance: 20,814; Referee: Alan Kelly

June 27, 2014 MLS 17	Portland Timbers	0–1	Sporting Kansas City	Portland, Oregon, U.S.
20:00(PDT)	Johnson (yellow card) 90+5'	report	Olum 24'; Sinovic (yellow card) 36'; Ellis (yellow card) 65'; Nagamura (yellow card) 90+4'; Dwyer (yellow card) 90+6'	Stadium: Providence Park; Attendance: 20,814; Referee: Armando Villareal

July 4, 2014 MLS 18	LA Galaxy	2–2	Portland Timbers	Carson, California, U.S.
20:00(PDT)	Gargan (yellow card) 40'; Zardes 65'; McKenzie 86' (o.g.)		Valeri (yellow card) 12' (goal) 67'; Villafaña 70'; Chará (yellow card) 76'	Stadium: StubHub Center; Attendance: 27,000; Referee: Jair Marrufo

July 13, 2014 MLS 19 Cascadia Cup	Seattle Sounders FC	2–0	Portland Timbers	Seattle, Washington, U.S.
19:00(PDT)	Alonso (yellow card) 31'; Dempsey 71'; Pappa 86'		Jewsbury (yellow card) 68'; Valeri (yellow card) 71'; Wallace (yellow card) 90+2'	Stadium: CenturyLink Field; Attendance: 64,207; Referee: Alan Kelly

July 18, 2014 MLS 20	Portland Timbers	2–1	Colorado Rapids	Portland, Oregon, U.S.
20:00(PDT)	O'Rourke (yellow card) 45'; Urruti 72'; Valeri 77'		Brown 16'; Powers (yellow card) 37'	Stadium: Providence Park; Attendance: 20,814; Referee: Ismail Elfath

July 27, 2014 MLS 21	Montreal Impact	2–3	Portland Timbers	Montreal, Quebec, Canada
17:00(PDT)	Romero 13'; Camara (yellow card) 32'; Bernier (yellow card) 42'; Tissot 44'; Król (yellow card) 90'		Urruti 34'; Johnson 40' (pen.); Valeri 82'	Stadium: Saputo Stadium; Attendance: 14,715; Referee: Silviu Petrescu

August 2, 2014 MLS 22	LA Galaxy	3–1	Portland Timbers	Carson, California, U.S.
11:30(PDT)	Zardes 45+3'; Keane 73' 85' (pen.); Sarvas (yellow card) 75'		Valeri 14'; Chará (yellow card) 81'	Stadium: StubHub Center; Attendance: 20,089; Referee: Kevin Stott

August 9, 2014 MLS 23	Portland Timbers	2–0	Chivas USA	Portland, Oregon, U.S.
19:30(PDT)	Valeri 10' (yellow card) 51'; Wallace 39'; Ridgewell (yellow card) 90+2'		Lochhead (yellow card) 12'; Minda (yellow card) 33'; Pelletieri (yellow card) 59'	Stadium: Providence Park; Attendance: 20,814; Referee: Drew Fischer

August 16, 2014 MLS 24	New England Revolution	1–1	Portland Timbers	Foxborough, Massachusetts, U.S.
16:30(PDT)	Davies 27'		Fernández (yellow card) 53'; Ridgewell 65'	Stadium: Gillette Stadium; Attendance: 16,409; Referee: Mark Geiger

August 24, 2014 MLS 25 Cascadia Cup	Portland Timbers	2–4	Seattle Sounders FC	Portland, Oregon, U.S.
14:00(PDT)	Ridgewell (yellow card) 23'; Paparatto (yellow card) 38'; Urruti (yellow card) 64'; Adi 73' 90+1'		Martins 18' 76'; Dempsey 34'; Marshall (yellow card) 46'; Scott (yellow card) 53'; Alonso (yellow card) 61'; Barrett 70'	Stadium: Providence Park; Attendance: 20,814; Referee: Baldomero Toledo

August 30, 2014 MLS 26 Cascadia Cup	Vancouver Whitecaps FC	0–3	Portland Timbers	Vancouver, British Columbia, Canada
TBD(PDT)			Powell 51'; Chará (yellow card) 66'; Urruti 75'; Wallace 79' (yellow card) 80'	Stadium: BC Place; Attendance: 21,000; Referee: Armando Villarreal

September 7, 2014 MLS 27	Portland Timbers	3–3	San Jose Earthquakes	Portland, Oregon, U.S.
14:00(PDT)	Powell 54' (yellow card) 88'; Johnson (yellow card) 57'; Ridgewell 74'; Alhassan 86'		Wondolowski 21' 85' (yellow card) 90+2'; Cato 48'; Francis (yellow card) 76'; Salinas (yellow card) 81'; Bernárdez (yellow card) 90+1'	Stadium: Providence Park; Attendance: 20,814; Referee: Allen Chapman

September 13, 2014 MLS 28	Colorado Rapids	2–2	Portland Timbers	Commerce City, Colorado, U.S.
18:00(PDT)	Powers 48' (pen.); Brown 66'; Hill (yellow card) 73'; LaBrocca (yellow card) 90+1'		Valeri 43' (yellow card) 67'; Fernández 76'	Stadium: Dick's Sporting Goods Park; Attendance: 15,984; Referee: Drew Fischer

September 20, 2014 MLS 29 Cascadia Cup	Portland Timbers	3–0	Vancouver Whitecaps FC	Portland, Oregon, U.S.
14:00(PDT)	Kah (yellow card) 24'; Valeri 28'; Adi 66' 69'		Laba (yellow card) 16'; Watson (yellow card) 24'	Stadium: Providence Park; Attendance: 20,814; Referee: Hilario Grajeda

September 27, 2014 MLS 30	Toronto FC	3–2	Portland Timbers	Toronto, Ontario, Canada
10:00(PDT)	Hagglund 62' 70'; Bradley 89'; Moore (yellow card) 90+1'		Adi 13'; Caldwell 16' (o.g.); Chará (yellow card) 45+7'; Valeri (yellow card) 88'	Stadium: BMO Field; Attendance: 22,591; Referee: Ismail Elfath

October 4, 2014 MLS 31	San Jose Earthquakes	1–2	Portland Timbers	Santa Clara, California, U.S.
19:30(PDT)	Hernandez (yellow card) 21'; Wondolowski 56'; Pintos (red card) 90+3'		Wallace 71' 74' (yellow card) 78'	Stadium: Buck Shaw Stadium; Attendance: 10,525; Referee: Kevin Stott

October 8, 2014 MLS 32	Portland Timbers	3–0	San Jose Earthquakes	Portland, Oregon, U.S.
19:30(PDT)	Zemanski (yellow card) 20'; Wallace 41'; Valeri 51' (pen.) 73'; Paparatto (yellow card) 65'		Francis (yellow card) 30'	Stadium: Providence Park; Attendance: 20,814; Referee: Baldomero Toledo

October 17, 2014 MLS 33	Portland Timbers	0–0	Real Salt Lake	Portland, Oregon, U.S.
19:00(PDT)	Valeri (yellow card) 55'; Ridgewell (yellow card) 58'; Paparatto (yellow card) 90+2'		Beckerman (yellow card) 55'	Stadium: Providence Park; Attendance: 20,814; Referee: Mark Geiger

October 25, 2014 MLS 34	FC Dallas	0–2	Portland Timbers	Frisco, Texas, U.S.
17:30(PDT)	Castillo (yellow card) 63'; Texeira (yellow card) 68'		Nagbe 43'; Fernández (yellow card) 61'; Urruti 82'	Stadium: Toyota Stadium; Attendance: 17,231; Referee: Jair Marrufo

==== Western Conference standings ====
Pos	Team	Pld	W	L	T	GF	GA	GD	Pts	Qualification
1	Seattle Sounders FC	34	20	10	4	65	50	+15	64	MLS Cup Conference Semifinals
2	LA Galaxy	34	17	7	10	69	37	+32	61	MLS Cup Conference Semifinals
3	Real Salt Lake	34	15	8	11	54	39	+15	56	MLS Cup Conference Semifinals
4	FC Dallas	34	16	12	6	55	45	+10	54	MLS Cup Knockout round
5	Vancouver Whitecaps FC	34	12	8	14	42	40	+2	50	MLS Cup Knockout round
6	Portland Timbers	34	12	9	13	61	52	+9	49	
7	Chivas USA	34	9	19	6	29	61	−32	33	
8	Colorado Rapids	34	8	18	8	43	62	−19	32	
9	San Jose Earthquakes	34	6	16	12	35	50	−15	30	

Source: MLS

Updated to matches played on September 25, 2013, 01:00 EDT
Source: gue Soccer (MLS), the top flight MLSSoccer.com
(W1) = Western Conference champion; (WC) = Qualifies for playoffs via wild-card.
Only applicable when the season is not finished:
(Q) = Qualified for the MLS Cup Playoffs, but not yet to the particular round indicated; (E) = Eliminated from playoff contention.

==== Overall standings ====
Pos	Team	Pld	W	L	T	GF	GA	GD	Pts	Qualification
1	Seattle Sounders FC (S)	34	20	10	4	65	50	+15	64	CONCACAF Champions League
2	LA Galaxy (C)	34	17	7	10	69	37	+32	61	CONCACAF Champions League
3	D.C. United	34	17	9	8	52	37	+15	59	CONCACAF Champions League
4	Real Salt Lake	34	15	8	11	54	39	+15	56	CONCACAF Champions League
5	New England Revolution	34	17	13	4	51	46	+5	55	
6	FC Dallas	34	16	12	6	55	45	+10	54	
7	Columbus Crew	34	14	10	10	52	42	+10	52	
8	New York Red Bulls	34	13	10	11	55	50	+5	50	
9	Vancouver Whitecaps FC	34	12	8	14	42	40	+2	50	CONCACAF Champions League
10	Sporting Kansas City	34	14	13	7	48	41	+7	49	
11	Portland Timbers	34	12	9	13	61	52	+9	49	
12	Philadelphia Union	34	10	12	12	51	51	0	42	
13	Toronto FC	34	11	15	8	44	54	−10	41	
14	Houston Dynamo	34	11	17	6	39	58	−19	39	
15	Chicago Fire	34	6	10	18	41	51	−10	36	
16	Chivas USA	34	9	19	6	29	61	−32	33	
17	Colorado Rapids	34	8	18	8	43	62	−19	32	
18	San Jose Earthquakes	34	6	16	12	35	50	−15	30	
19	Montreal Impact	34	6	18	10	38	58	−20	28	

Source: MLS
Rules for classification: 1) points; 2) head-to-head record; 3) goal difference; 4) number of goals scored
(C) MLS Cup Champion; (S) Supporters' Shield

==== Results summary ====
Overall								Home						Away					
Pld	Pts	W	L	T	GF	GA	GD	W	L	T	GF	GA	GD	W	L	T	GF	GA	GD
23	30	7	7	9	38	38	0	3	2	7	23	21	+2	4	5	2	15	17	−2

Last updated: August 12, 2014
Source: Portland Timbers
Pld = Matches played; Pts = Points; W = Matches won; T = Matches tied; L = Matches lost; GF = Goals for; GA = Goals against; GD = Goal difference

==== Results by round ====
Round	1	2	3	4	5	6	7	8	9	10	11	12	13	14	15	16	17	18	19	20	21	22	23	24	25	26	27	28	29	30	31	32	33	34
Stadium	H	H	A	A	H	H	A	A	H	H	H	A	A	H	A	H	H	A	A	H	A	A	H	A	H	A	H	A	H	A	A	H	H	A
Result	D	D	L	L	D	D	L	D	W	D	D	W	W	L	W	D	L	D	L	W	W	L	W	D	L	W	D	D	W	L	W	W	D	W

Updated to match(es) played on December 16, 2014. Source: timbers.com
A = Away; H = Home; W = Win; D = Draw; L = Loss

=== U.S. Open Cup ===
June 17 Fourth Round	Portland Timbers	3–0	Orlando City U-23 (PDL)	Portland, Oregon
19:30 PT	Fernández 11', 36' (pen.); Peay 68'	Report		Stadium: Providence Park; Attendance: 10,619; Referee: Juan Guzman

June 24 Fifth Round	Sporting Kansas City	1–3	Portland Timbers	Kansas City, Kansas
17:30 PT	Collin (yellow card) 59'; Saad 73' (pen.)	Report	Fernández 30', 68'; Johnson 57' (pen.); Alhassan (yellow card) 85'	Stadium: Sporting Park; Attendance: 11,138; Referee: Ricardo Salazar

July 9 Sixth Round	Seattle Sounders FC	3–1 (a.e.t.)	Portland Timbers	Tukwila, Washington
19:30 PT	Alonso 69'; Cooper 110'; Pappa 115'	Report	Nagbe 90+3'	Stadium: Starfire Sports Complex; Attendance: 4,233; Referee: Chris Penso

=== 2014–15 CONCACAF Champions League ===
Eight groups of 3 teams will be drawn, with each group containing at least one Mexican club and one American club.

Pot A
(Mexico) León	(Mexico) Pachuca	(United States) Sporting Kansas City	(United States) New York Red Bulls
(Costa Rica) Alajuelense	(Honduras) Olimpia	(Guatemala) Comunicaciones	(Panama) Tauro
Pot B
(Mexico) América	(Mexico) Cruz Azul	(United States) Portland Timbers	(United States) D.C. United
(Costa Rica) Saprissa	(Honduras) Real España	(El Salvador) Isidro Metapán	(Canada) Montreal Impact
Pot C
(Guatemala) Municipal	(El Salvador) FAS	(Panama) Chorrillo	(Nicaragua) Real Estelí
(Belize) Belmopan Bandits	Puerto Rico Bayamón FC	(Jamaica) Waterhouse	(Guyana) Alpha United

==== Group 5 ====
Pos	Team	Pld	W	D	L	GF	GA	GD	Pts	Qualification	OLI	POR	ALP
1	(Honduras) Olimpia	4	3	0	1	12	5	+7	9 (Note: Olimpia finished ahead of Portland Timbers based on head-to-head away goals scored (2–1).)	Advance to championship stage	—	3–1	6–0
2	(United States) Portland Timbers	4	3	0	1	15	6	+9	9		4–2	—	6–0
3	(Guyana) Alpha United	4	0	0	4	1	17	−16	0		0–1	1–4	—

Source: CONCACAF
Rules for classification: Group stage tiebreakers
Notes:

19 August 2014 CCL Group 1	Alpha United FC (Guyana)	1–4	(United States) Portland Timbers	Georgetown, Guyana
20:00	Murillo 45'	Report; Box Score	Zakuani 18'; Urruti 34'; Jewsbury (yellow card) 58'; Adi 66'; Powell 83'	Stadium: Guyana National Stadium; Referee: Jeffrey Solis

16 September 2014 CCL Group 2	Portland Timbers (United States)	4–2	(Honduras) CD Olimpia	Portland, Oregon, United States
22:00	Urruti 11' 51'; Johnson 26'; O'Rourke (yellow card) 40'; McKenzie 72'		Álvarez 24' de Souza (yellow card) 42'; Quioto 44'	Stadium: Providence Park; Attendance: 16,238; Referee: John Pitti

23 September 2014 CCL Group 3	Portland Timbers (United States)	6–0	(Guyana) Alpha United FC	Portland, Oregon, United States
22:00	Jewsbury 11' (yellow card) 38'; Fernández 36'; Nanchoff 49'; Paparatto 61' 88'; Adi 75'; Wallace (yellow card) 89'			Stadium: Providence Park; Attendance: 8,968; Referee: Ricardo Montero Araya

21 October 2014 CCL Group 4	CD Olimpia (Honduras)	3–1	(United States) Portland Timbers	Tegucigalpa, Honduras
22:00	Quioto 2'; Lozano 4', 54'; Mejía (yellow card) 63'; Álvarez (yellow card) 69'; Fonseca (yellow card) 74'	Report	Urruti (yellow card) 35'; O'Rourke (yellow card) 37'; Zemanski 52'; Villafaña (yellow card) 59'; Valeri (yellow card) 61'; Fernández (yellow card) 62'; Ridgewell (yellow card) 79'; Paparatto (yellow card) 80'	Stadium: Carías Stadium; Referee: Walter López

=== Cascadia Cup ===
The Cascadia Cup is a trophy that was created in 2004 by supporters of the Portland Timbers, Seattle Sounders FC and Vancouver Whitecaps FC. It is awarded to the club with the best record in league games versus the other participants.

2014
Team	Pld	W	L	D	GF	GA	GD	Pts
Vancouver Whitecaps FC	6	3	2	1	8	11	−3	10
Seattle Sounders FC	6	2	2	2	12	10	+2	8
Portland Timbers	6	2	3	1	15	14	+1	7

Source: "Cascadia Cup". cascadiacup.soccer. January 2014.

== Club ==
=== Kits ===
Primary	Primary Alt.	Secondary	Secondary Alt.	Third

Type	Shirt	Shorts	Socks	First appearance / Info
Primary	Green / White	White	Green	
Primary Alt.	Green / White	Green	Green	MLS, March 22 against Colorado
Secondary	Red / Black	Red	Red	
Secondary Alt.	Red / Black	Black	Red	MLS, July 13 against Seattle
Third	Dark green	Dark green	Dark green	

=== Executive staff ===
Majority Owner & President	Merritt Paulson
Chief Operating Officer	Mike Golub
General Manager / Technical Director	Gavin Wilkinson
Ground (capacity and dimensions)	Providence Park (20,438 / 110x70 yards)

Updated to match played January 23, 2012
Source: Portland Timbers

=== Coaching staff ===
Position	Staff
Head Coach	Caleb Porter
Assistant Coach	Pablo Moreira
Assistant Coach	Sean McAuley
Assistant Coach	Cameron Knowles
Goalkeeping Coach	Mike Toshack
Head Athletic Trainer	Nik Wald
Assistant Athletic Trainer	Alex Margarito

Last updated: January 26, 2012
Source: Portland Timbers

== Squad ==
=== Roster and statistics ===
All players contracted to the club during the season included. Regular season stats updated on November 29, 2014.

No.	Pos.	Nat.	Player	Total App	Total	Total (yellow card)	Total (red card)	MLS App.	MLS	MLS (yellow card)	MLS (red card)	Open Cup App.	Open Cup	Open Cup (yellow card)	Open Cup (red card)	CCL App.	CCL	CCL (yellow card)	CCL (red card)
1	GK	(Jamaica)	Donovan Ricketts	32	0	0	1	32	0	0	1	0	0	0	0	0	0	0	0
2	DF	(Jamaica)	Alvas Powell	15	2	1	1	5	0	1	0	0	0	0	0	0	0	0	0
4	MF	(Canada)	Will Johnson	29	6	4	0	28	9	4	0	0	0	0	0	0	0	0	0
5	DF	(United States)	Michael Harrington	25	0	1	1	33	0	2	0	0	0	0	0	0	0	0	0
6	FW	(Liberia)	Darlington Nagbe	32	1	0	0	34	9	1	0	0	0	0	0	0	0	0	0
7	MF	(Democratic Republic of the Congo)	Steve Zakuani	17	0	0	0	0	0	0	0	0	0	0	0	0	0	0	0
8	MF	(Argentina)	Diego Valeri	33	11	6	0	31	10	2	0	0	10	0	0	0	0	0	0
9	FW	(Martinique)	Frédéric Piquionne	3	0	0	0	21	1	0	0	0	5	0	0	0	0	0	0
10	FW	(Argentina)	Gastón Fernández	32	17	3	0	0	0	0	0	0	0	0	0	0	0	0	0
11	MF	(Ghana)	Kalif Alhassan	15	1	1	0	30	3	2	0	0	0	0	0	0	0	0	0
12	FW	(Zimbabwe)	Schillo Tshuma	0	0	0	0	0	0	0	0	0	0	0	0	0	0	0	0
13	MF	(United States)	Jack Jewsbury	19	0	1	0	26	0	0	0	0	0	0	0	0	0	0	0
14	MF	(United States)	Ben Zemanski	13	0	2	0	25	1	5	1	0	0	0	0	0	0	0	0
15	MF	(United States)	Steven Evans	0	0	0	0	0	0	0	0	0	0	0	0	0	0	0	0
16	DF	(United States)	Bryan Gallego	0	0	0	0	0	0	0	0	0	0	0	0	0	0	0	0
17	MF	(United States)	Michael Nanchoff	3	1	0	0	1	0	0	0	0	0	0	0	0	0	0	0
19	DF	(United States)	Jorge Villafaña	19	1	1	0	0	0	0	0	0	0	0	0	0	0	0	0
20	DF	(United States)	Taylor Peay	0	0	0	0	0	0	0	0	0	0	0	0	0	0	0	0
21	MF	(Colombia)	Diego Chará	31	2	8	0	31	2	8	0	31	0	0	0	0	0	0	0
22	MF	(Costa Rica)	Rodney Wallace	17	5	2	0	27	7	3	0	0	0	0	0	0	0	0	0
23	DF	(Argentina)	Norberto Paparatto	13	0	6	0	0	0	0	0	0	0	0	0	0	0	0	0
26	MF	(United States)	George Fochive	0	0	0	0	0	0	0	0	0	0	0	0	0	0	0	0
31	DF	(United States)	Rauwshan McKenzie	7	0	1	0	1	0	0	0	0	0	0	0	0	0	0	0
33	GK	(United States)	Andrew Weber	3	0	0	0	3	0	0	0	0	0	0	0	0	0	0	0
37	FW	(Argentina)	Maximiliano Urruti	30	10	1	0	5	4	1	0	0	0	0	0	0	0	0	0
44	DF	(Norway)	Pa Modou Kah	20	1	5	0	20	0	7	1	0	0	0	0	0	0	0	0
90	GK	(New Zealand)	Jake Gleeson	0	0	0	0	0	0	0	0	0	0	0	0	0	0	0	0
			Own goals for	0	0	0	0	0	0	0	0	0	0	0	0	0	0	0	0

=== Goalkeeper stats ===
Last updated: March 8, 2014

No.	Nat	Player	Total				Major League Soccer				U.S. Open Cup				CCL			
No.	Nat	Player	MIN	GA	GAA	SV	MIN	GA	GAA	SV	MIN	GA	GAA	SV	MIN	GA	GAA	SV
1	(Jamaica)	Donovan Ricketts	90	1	1.00	5	90	1	1.00	5	0	0	0	0	0	0	0.00	0
33	(United States)	Andrew Weber	0	0	0.00	0	0	0	0.00	0	0	0	0.00	0	0	0	0.00	0
90	(New Zealand)	Jake Gleeson	0	0	0.00	0	0	0	0.00	0	0	0	0.00	0	0	0	0.00	0
		TOTALS	90	1	1.00	5	90	1	1.00	5	0	0	0.00	0	0	0	0.00	0

=== Player movement ===
==== Transfers in ====
Date	Player	Pos	Previous club	Fee/notes	Ref
December 12, 2013	(United States) Jorge Villafaña	MF	(United States) Chivas USA	Traded along with the number 2 pick in the 1st Stage of the 2013 MLS Re-Entry Draft for Andrew Jean-Baptiste	
December 12, 2013	(Democratic Republic of the Congo) Steve Zakuani	MF	(United States) Seattle Sounders FC	Selected with the number 2 pick in the 1st Stage of the 2013 MLS Re-Entry Draft	
January 10, 2014	(United States) Andrew Weber	GK	(United States) Phoenix FC	Signed as free agent	
January 15, 2014	(United States) Bryan Gallego	DF	University of Akron (United States) Portland Timbers U23s	Signed as Homegrown Player Rule	
January 15, 2014	(Argentina) Gastón Fernández	FW	(Argentina) Estudiantes de La Plata		
January 15, 2014	(Argentina) Norberto Paparatto	DF	(Argentina) Club Atlético Tigre		
February 11, 2014	(Zimbabwe) Schillo Tshuma	FW	University of Maryland	A Generation Adidas contract	
February 11, 2014	(United States) Taylor Peay	DF	University of Washington		
February 25, 2014	(United States) George Fochive	MF	University of Connecticut		
February 25, 2014	(United States) Aaron Long	MF	UC Riverside		
May 27, 2014	(United States) Danny O'Rourke	DF	(United States) Columbus Crew	Signed as Free Agent	
June 23, 2014	(Nigeria) Fanendo Adi	FW	(Denmark) Copenhagen	Signed permanent Designated Player contract	
June 25, 2014	(England) Liam Ridgewell	DF	(England) West Bromwich Albion	Signed Designated Player contract	

==== Loans in ====
Date	Player	Pos	Previous club	Fee/notes	Ref

==== Loans out ====
Date	Player	Pos	Destination club	Fee/notes	Ref
January 15, 2014	(Colombia) José Adolfo Valencia	FW	(Argentina) Club Olimpo	Season-long loan	
February 18, 2014	(New Zealand) Jake Gleeson	GK	Sacramento Republic FC	Loaned as part of partnership	
February 18, 2014	(United States) Bryan Gallego	DF	Sacramento Republic FC	Loaned as part of partnership	
January 15, 2014	(United States) Aaron Long	MF	Sacramento Republic FC	Loaned as part of partnership	

==== Transfers out ====
Date	Player	Pos	Destination club	Fee/notes	Ref
December 9, 2013	(United States) David Horst	DF	(United States) Houston Dynamo	2014 Option Declined. Rights traded to Houston Dynamo for 4th Round pick in 2014 MLS SuperDraft	
December 9, 2013	(United States) Ryan Miller	DF	N/A	2014 Option Declined	
December 9, 2013	(United States) Dylan Tucker-Gangnes	DF	N/A	Waived ahead of 2013 MLS Re-Entry Draft	
December 9, 2013	(United States) Brent Richards	FW	N/A	Waived ahead of 2013 MLS Re-Entry Draft	
December 12, 2013	(United States) Andrew Jean-Baptiste	DF	(United States) Chivas USA	Traded for Jorge Villafaña and the number 2 pick in the 1st Stage of the 2013 MLS Re-Entry Draft	
December 13, 2013	(United States) Sal Zizzo	MF	(United States) Sporting Kansas City	Traded for allocation money	
January 10, 2014	(Colombia) Sebastián Rincón	FW	(Argentina) Club Atlético Tigre	Not re-signed after end of loan	
January 27, 2014	(France) Mikaël Silvestre	DF	(India) Chennaiyin FC	Mutually agreed to terminate contract	
February 27, 2014	(Jamaica) Ryan Johnson	FW	(China) Henan Jianye F.C.	No longer on roster. No press release made.	
May 13, 2014	(France) Frédéric Piquionne	FW	(France) US Créteil	Waived	
June 2, 2014	(The Gambia) Mamadou Danso	FW	(Canada) Montreal Impact	Traded for a 2nd-round pick in 2015 MLS SuperDraft	
July 2, 2014	(United States) Aaron Long	MF	(United States) Seattle Sounders FC	Released	
N/A	(Serbia) Miloš Kocić	GK	Retired	Announced retirement and no longer on roster. No press release made.	

==== 2013 MLS Re-Entry Draft Picks ====
Round (Overall Pick)	Player	Pos	Previous club	Ref
1 (2)	(Democratic Republic of the Congo) Steve Zakuani	DF	(United States) Seattle Sounders FC	

==== 2014 MLS SuperDraft Picks ====
Round (Overall Pick)	Player	Pos	Previous club	Ref
1 (17)	(Zimbabwe) Schillo Tshuma	FW	University of Maryland	
2 (26)	(United States) Taylor Peay	DF	University of Washington	
2 (36)	(United States) Aaron Long	MF	UC Riverside	
3 (39)	(United States) George Fochive	MF	University of Connecticut	
4 (71)	(United States) Victor Chavez	FW	UCLA	
4 (73)	(United States) Nikita Kotlov	MF	Indiana University	

==== Unsigned trialists ====
Player	Pos	Previous club	Notes
(United States) Richard Menjivar	MF	(United States) Atlanta Silverbacks	Preseason
(United States) Justin Luthy	GK	Boston College	Preseason
(Ghana) Francis Dadzie	FW	(Ghana) Bechem United	Preseason

=== Miscellaneous ===
==== International roster slots ====
Portland Timbers international slots
Slot	Player	Nationality
1	Kalif Alhassan	Ghana
2	Gastón Fernández	Argentina
3	Pa Modou Kah	Norway
4	Norberto Paparatto	Argentina
5	Frédéric Piquionne	Martinique
6	Maximiliano Urruti	Argentina
7	Diego Valeri	Argentina
8		

Foreign-born players with domestic status
Player	Nationality
Diego Chará	Colombia
Mamadou Danso	The Gambia
Jake Gleeson	New Zealand
Will Johnson	Canada / (United States) / (England)
Darlington Nagbe	Liberia
Donovan Ricketts	Jamaica
Rodney Wallace	Costa Rica
