= Zakuani =

Zakuani is a surname. Notable people with the surname include:

- Gabriel Zakuani (born 1986), Congolese footballer and manager
- Steve Zakuani (born 1988), Congolese footballer, brother of Gabriel
