= Diego Chará =

Colombian footballer (born 1986)

- Chará with the Portland Timbers in 2015

Personal information
- Full name: Diego Ferney Chará Zamora
- Date of birth: 5 April 1986 (age 40)
- Place of birth: Cali, Valle del Cauca, Colombia
- Height: 1.72 m (5 ft 8 in)
- Position: Defensive midfielder

Team information
- Current team: Portland Timbers
- Number: 21

Youth career
- Deportes Quindío

Senior career*
| Years | Team | Apps | (Gls) |
| 2004–2008 | Deportes Quindío | 124 | (2) |
| 2009 | América de Cali | 31 | (1) |
| 2010–2011 | Deportes Tolima | 51 | (5) |
| 2011– | Portland Timbers | 453 | (12) |

International career
| 2010–2011 | Colombia | 2 | (0) |
- * Club domestic league appearances and goals as of 7 November 2026

Diego Ferney Chará Zamora (born 5 April 1986) is a Colombian professional footballer who plays as a defensive midfielder and captains Major League Soccer club Portland Timbers.

== Club career ==
Chará began his career in the youth ranks of Deportes Quindío. In 2004, he moved up to the senior side and became an important player for Quindío. The talented midfielder made 124 league appearances and scored two goals while with Quindío. As a result of his play, he began to draw the attention of the top clubs in Colombia and in 2009 joined América de Cali. In one year with the club, Chará made 31 league appearances and scored one goal. The following season, he joined Deportes Tolima and was a key player in his club's run to the quarter-finals of the 2010 Copa Sudamericana. The following season, he helped Tolima qualify to the 2011 Copa Libertadores. During the 2011 Copa Libertadores Chará appeared in seven games, and provided an assist in a 2–0 win over Brazilian power Corinthians in the early stages of the tournament.

As a result of his play during the Copa Libertadores run, Chará started to receive interest from Major League Soccer side Portland Timbers. In April 2011, Chará signed with Portland and became the club's first ever Designated Player. Chará made his club debut April 23 at LA Galaxy, coming on as a second-half sub. On 20 August, he scored his first goal in MLS after just 78 seconds of Portland's home match against Cascadia Cup rivals Vancouver Whitecaps FC. It broke the record for the fastest MLS goal for the club.

Chará became the second Major League Soccer player to record more than 30,000 minutes for a single club on 19 March 2023, during a 5–1 loss to Atlanta United.

== International career ==
Chará was capped twice for the Colombia senior team. He played his first game for Colombia on 18 November 2010 in a friendly match against Peru.

== Personal life ==
Chará's older brother, Felipe Chará, and his younger brother, Yimmi Chará, are also professional footballers. Yimmi played with Diego on the Timbers between 2020 and 2023.

Chará became a naturalized United States citizen in August 2019. Before that, he held a U.S. green card, which qualified him as a domestic player for MLS roster purposes.

== Career statistics ==
=== Club ===
As of match played 21 November 2026

Appearances and goals by club, season and competition
| Club | Season | League | | | National cup (Note: Includes U.S. Open Cup) | | League cup (Note: Includes MLS Cup playoffs) | | Continental | | Other | | Total | |
| Club | Season | Division | Apps | Goals | Apps | Goals | Apps | Goals | Apps | Goals | Apps | Goals | Apps | Goals |
|---|---|---|---|---|---|---|---|---|---|---|---|---|---|---|
| América de Cali | 2009 | Categoría Primera A | 31 | 1 | — | | — | | 6 (Note: Appearances in Copa Libertadores) | 0 | — | | 37 | 1 |
| Deportes Tolima | 2010 | Categoría Primera A | 42 | 3 | — | | — | | 6 (Note: Appearances in Copa Sudamericana) | 0 | — | | 48 | 3 |
| Deportes Tolima | 2011 | Categoría Primera A | 9 | 2 | — | | — | | 7 | 0 | — | | 16 | 2 |
| Deportes Tolima | Total | | 51 | 5 | — | | — | | 13 | 0 | — | | 64 | 5 |
| Portland Timbers | 2011 | MLS | 28 | 2 | — | | — | | — | | — | | 28 | 2 |
| Portland Timbers | 2012 | MLS | 28 | 0 | 1 | 0 | — | | — | | — | | 29 | 0 |
| Portland Timbers | 2013 | MLS | 31 | 0 | 2 | 0 | 4 | 0 | — | | — | | 37 | 0 |
| Portland Timbers | 2014 | MLS | 31 | 2 | 1 | 0 | — | | 0 | 0 | — | | 32 | 2 |
| Portland Timbers | 2015 | MLS | 28 | 2 | 0 | 0 | 4 | 1 | — | | — | | 32 | 3 |
| Portland Timbers | 2016 | MLS | 30 | 0 | 0 | 0 | — | | 4 (Note: Appearances in CONCACAF Champions League) | 0 | — | | 34 | 0 |
| Portland Timbers | 2017 | MLS | 29 | 1 | 0 | 0 | 1 | 0 | — | | — | | 30 | 1 |
| Portland Timbers | 2018 | MLS | 27 | 2 | 3 | 0 | 6 | 0 | — | | — | | 36 | 2 |
| Portland Timbers | 2019 | MLS | 30 | 0 | 4 | 0 | 1 | 0 | — | | — | | 35 | 0 |
| Portland Timbers | 2020 | MLS | 20 (Note: Includes three appearances in MLS is Back Tournament group stage) | 1 | — | | 1 | 0 | — | | 4 (Note: Appearances in MLS is Back Tournament knockout stage) | 0 | 25 | 1 |
| Portland Timbers | 2021 | MLS | 28 | 2 | — | | 4 | 0 | 4 | 0 | — | | 36 | 2 |
| Portland Timbers | 2022 | MLS | 28 | 0 | 1 | 0 | — | | — | | — | | 29 | 0 |
| Portland Timbers | 2023 | MLS | 29 | 0 | 0 | 0 | — | | — | | 3 (Note: Appearance(s) in Leagues Cup) | 0 | 32 | 0 |
| Portland Timbers | 2024 | MLS | 32 | 0 | — | | 1 | 0 | — | | 2 | 0 | 35 | 0 |
| Portland Timbers | 2025 | MLS | 27 | 0 | 0 | 0 | 4 | 0 | — | | 2 | 0 | 33 | 0 |
| Portland Timbers | 2026 | MLS | 27 | 0 | — | | 1 | 0 | — | | 1 | 0 | 29 | 0 |
| Portland Timbers | Total | | 453 | 12 | 12 | 0 | 27 | 1 | 8 | 0 | 12 | 0 | 512 | 13 |
| Career total | | | 535 | 18 | 12 | 0 | 27 | 1 | 27 | 0 | 12 | 0 | 613 | 19 |

=== International ===
Appearances and goals by national team and year
| National team | Year | Apps | Goals |
|---|---|---|---|
| Colombia | 2010 | 1 | 0 |
| Colombia | 2011 | 1 | 0 |
| Total | | 2 | 0 |

== Honours ==
Portland Timbers

- MLS Cup: 2015
- MLS is Back Tournament: 2020
- Western Conference (playoffs): 2015, 2018, 2021
- Western Conference (regular season): 2013, 2017

Individual

- MLS All-Star: 2019
- MLS Best XI: 2020
