= Fanendo Adi =

Nigerian footballer (born 1990)

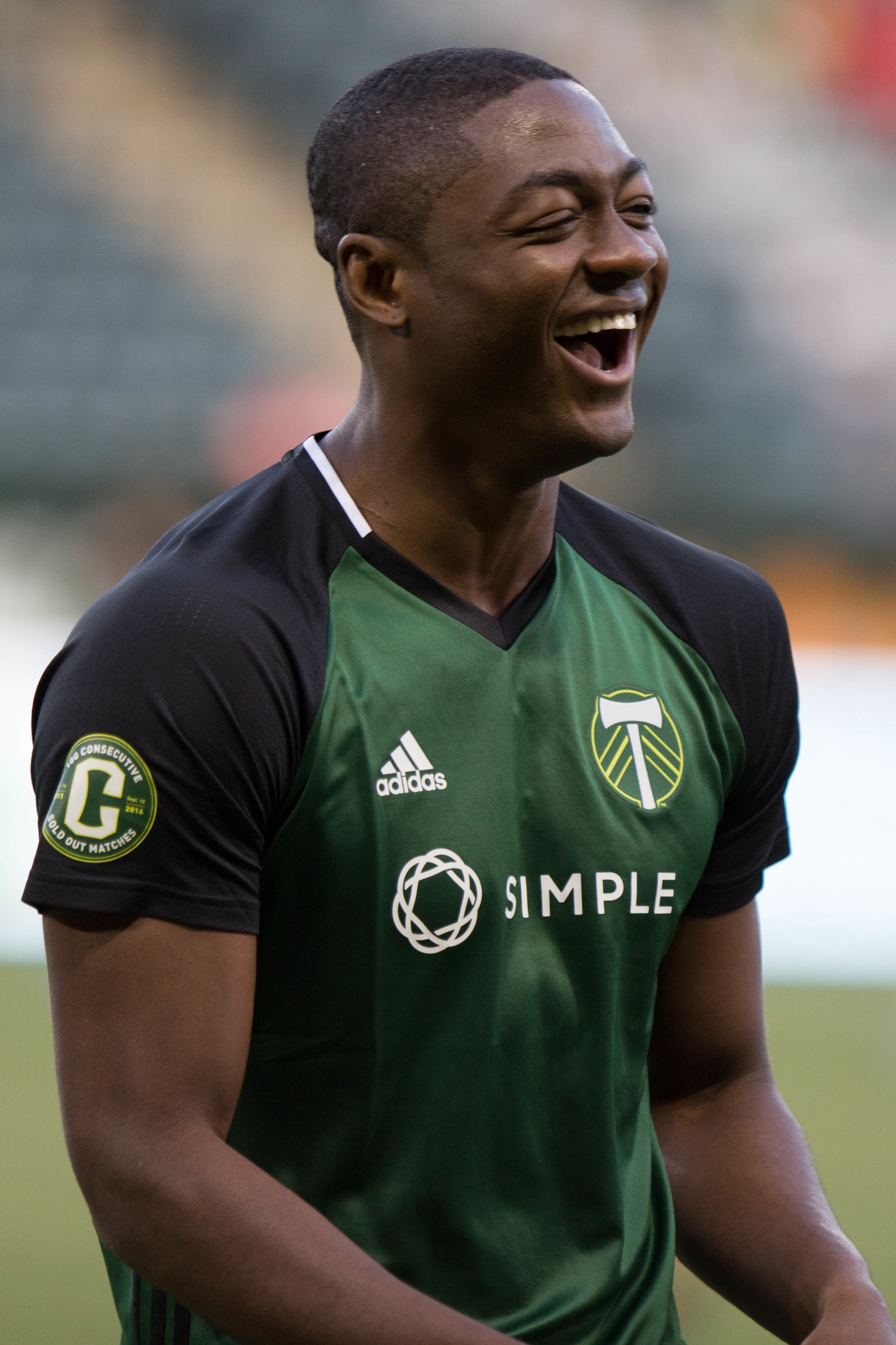
- Adi with Portland Timbers in 2016

Personal information
- Date of birth: 10 October 1990 (age 36)
- Place of birth: Lagos, Nigeria
- Height: 1.93 m (6 ft 4 in)
- Position: Forward

Youth career
- Lagos Islanders
- Union Bank

Senior career*
Years	Team	Apps	(Gls)
2009–2011	AS Trenčín	42	(18)
2011	Metalurh Donetsk	9	(1)
2011	→ Dynamo Kyiv (loan)	3	(0)
2011–2012	Tavriya Simferopol	9	(1)
2012–2013	AS Trenčín	19	(10)
2013–2014	Copenhagen	9	(3)
2014	→ Portland Timbers (loan)	6	(4)
2014–2018	Portland Timbers	121	(50)
2018–2019	FC Cincinnati	21	(4)
2020	Columbus Crew	11	(0)
2021	Minnesota United	10	(1)
Total		259	(92)

International career
2011	Nigeria U23	2	(3)
- * Club domestic league appearances and goals as of 8 November 2021

Fanendo Adi(born 10 October 1990) is a Nigerian former footballer who played as a striker.

== Club career ==
=== Europe ===
Following his transfer from AS Trencin, Adi scored a goal in his F.C. Copenhagen debut against FC Vestsjælland on 25 August, despite not having his work and residency permit.

In January 2011, Adi, then 20 years old, was invited for a trial by Ajax for the second time.

=== Portland Timbers ===
On 13 May 2014, Adi went on loan with the option to buy to Portland Timbers of Major League Soccer. He made his debut coming on as a substitute against Columbus Crew and got the game tying assist, a feat which earned him a start in the following match. In his first start for the club, on 28 May 2014 against Chivas USA, Adi scored his first and second goals for the club. On 7 June he received his second start and scored two goals in the first half against Real Salt Lake.

Adi was signed permanently by the Portland Timbers on 23 June 2014. He became the club's fourth ever Designated Player. He was the top scorer with 18 goals in both 2015 and 2016. On 8 April 2017, after scoring a penalty kick against the Philadelphia Union, Adi became the Timbers' all-time leading goalscorer, with 46 goals.

=== FC Cincinnati ===
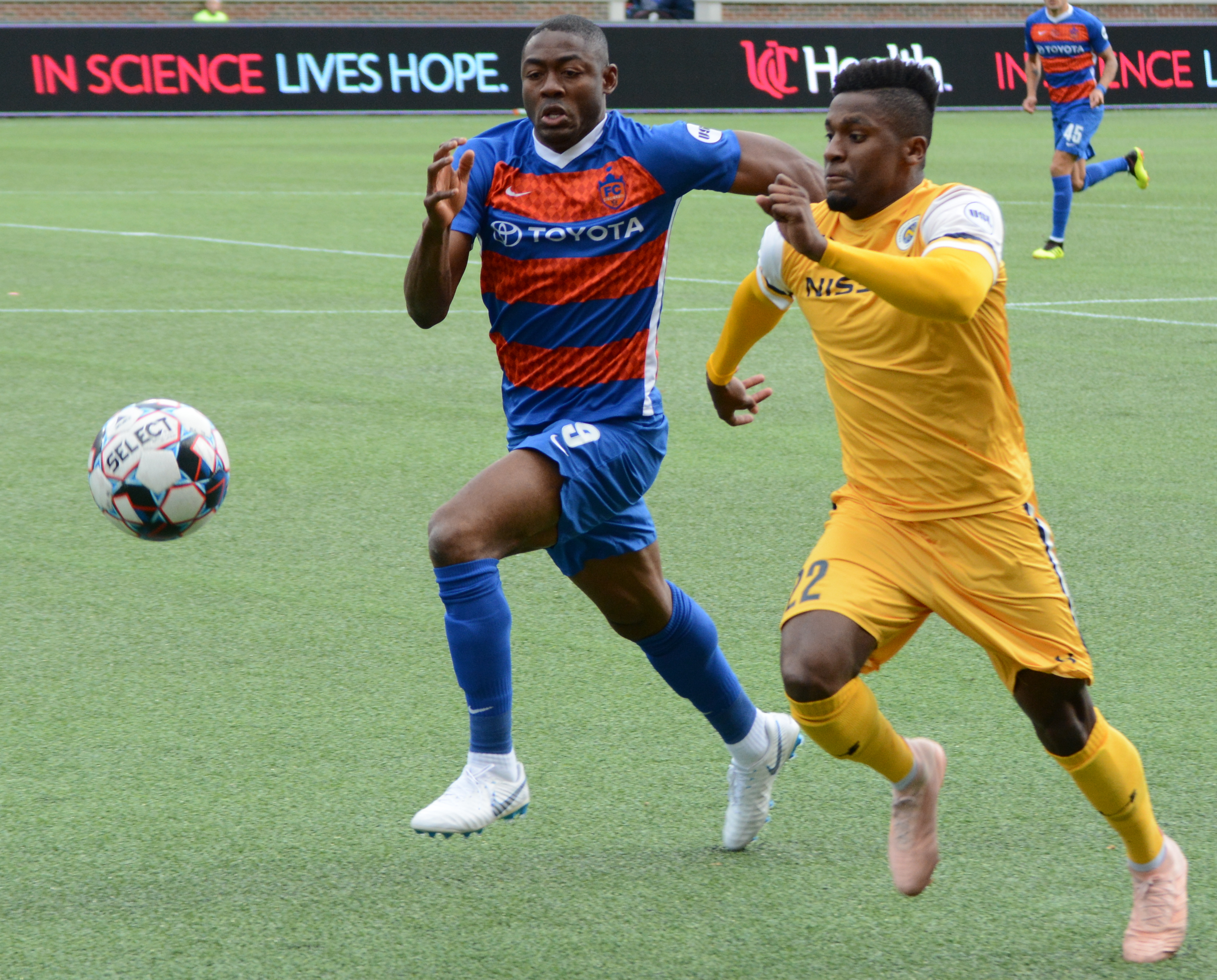
Adi (left) dueling with Bradley Bourgeois of Nashville SC in a 2018 FC Cincinnati match

Adi was traded from Portland Timbers to MLS expansion side FC Cincinnati on 30 July 2018 for a deal worth up to $1,000,000 in allocation money. He played the remainder of the 2018 season with FC Cincinnati in the United Soccer League ahead of the club's move up to Major League Soccer.

Adi started in the first three matches of FC Cincinnati's inaugural MLS season. However, in the third match on 17 March (Cincinnati's home opener against Portland Timbers), he was injured after a collision with Larrys Mabiala late in the first half, and was subbed out at halftime. He remained on the bench with a left ankle injury the next two matches.

At approximately 3:45am on 31 March 2019, Adi was pulled over by the Ohio State Highway Patrol and cited for operating a vehicle under the influence of alcohol (OVI), speeding, and not possessing a valid driver's license. According to the police, Adi was driving 102 mph in a 65 mph zone, showed a blood alcohol content of 0.124 in a breathalyzer test, and possessed only a Ukrainian driver's license. Adi was suspended by FC Cincinnati and entered MLS' Substance Abuse and Behavioral Health program.

Adi was cleared from suspension on 24 April and began practicing with the team the following day; however, his minutes remained limited as his ankle was still recovering. He made his first appearance since the injury in the final 11 minutes of a San Jose Earthquakes match on 4 May. He played another 26 minutes as a substitute in the following two matches. On 25 May, Adi started for the first time since 17 March and played a full 90 minutes.

Adi scored his first goal of 2019 in a U.S. Open Cup match against Louisville City FC on 12 June. He scored his first goal in the 2019 MLS season on July 13 against the Chicago Fire. It gave FC Cincinnati the lead and victory, 2–1.

Following a tumultuous season with Cincinnati, Adi was waived by the club on 17 January 2020, ahead of the 2020 season.

=== Columbus Crew ===
On 27 January 2020, Columbus Crew SC announced that it had claimed Adi off the Major League Soccer Waiver List. Adi's contract with Columbus expired following their 2020 season.

=== Minnesota United ===
Minnesota United FC signed Adi to a one-year deal with a one-year option on 27 August 2021.

== International career ==
Adi was called up to Nigeria's U23 team twice in 2011. He was also called up to the senior Nigeria squad to face Egypt in a 2017 Africa Cup of Nations qualifier in March 2016 but did not play.

== Coaching ==
In February 2023, Adi was named head coach for the Minnesota United Academy U-19 team.

== Career statistics ==
As of match played 8 November 2021

Appearances and goals by club, season and competition
Club	Season	League			National cup		Continental		Other		Total	
Club	Season	Division	Apps	Goals	Apps	Goals	Apps	Goals	Apps	Goals	Apps	Goals
Metalurh Donetsk	2010–11	Ukrainian Premier League	9	1	—		—		—		9	1
Dynamo Kyiv (loan)	2011–12	Ukrainian Premier League	3	0	1	1	0	0	—		4	1
Tavriya Simferopol	2011–12	Ukrainian Premier League	9	1	—		—		—		9	1
AS Trenčín	2012–13	Slovak First Football League	16	3	0	0	—		—		16	3
AS Trenčín	2013–14	Slovak First Football League	3	7	—		4	3	—		7	10
AS Trenčín	Total		19	10	0	0	4	3	—		23	13
F.C. Copenhagen	2013–14	Danish Superliga	9	3	1	0	3	0	—		13	3
Portland Timbers (loan)	2014	Major League Soccer	6	4	—		—		—		6	4
Portland Timbers	2014	Major League Soccer	19	5	2	0	4	2	—		25	7
Portland Timbers	2015	Major League Soccer	33	16	2	0	—		6	2	41	18
Portland Timbers	2016	Major League Soccer	33	16	1	0	3	2	—		37	18
Portland Timbers	2017	Major League Soccer	22	10	0	0	—		0	0	22	10
Portland Timbers	2018	Major League Soccer	14	3	1	0	—		—		15	3
Portland Timbers	Total		127	54	6	0	7	4	6	2	146	60
FC Cincinnati	2018	USL Championship	11	3	—		—		—		11	3
FC Cincinnati	2019	Major League Soccer	12	1	2	1	—		—		14	2
FC Cincinnati	Total		23	4	2	1	—		—		25	5
Columbus Crew	2020	Major League Soccer	12	0	—		—		—		12	0
Minnesota United	2021	Major League Soccer	10	1	—		—		0	0	10	1
Career total			221	74	10	2	14	7	6	2	251	85

== Honors ==
Portland Timbers

- MLS Cup: 2015
- Western Conference championship (in playoffs): 2015

FC Cincinnati

- USL regular season: 2018

Columbus Crew

- MLS Cup: 2020
