= 2013 MLS Re-Entry Draft =

College draft for soccer teams

General information
- Dates: Stage 1: December 12, 2013; Stage 2: December 18, 2013

Overview
- League: Major League Soccer
- Teams: 19

The two-stage 2013 MLS Re-Entry Draft took place on December 12, 2013 (Stage 1) and December 18, 2013 (Stage 2). All 19 Major League Soccer clubs were eligible to participate.

The Stage 1 and Stage 2 Drafts were conducted in the same order as the traditional Waiver Draft, with clubs choosing in reverse order of their 2013 Major League Soccer season finish.

Teams selected players who fell under the following circumstances:

- Players who were at least 23 years old, had a minimum of three years of MLS experience, and whose options were not exercised by their club (available at option salary for 2014).
- Players who were at least 25 years old, had a minimum of four years of MLS experience, were out of contract, and whose club did not offer them a contract at their previous salary (available at 2013 salary).
- Players who were at least 30 years old, had a minimum of eight years of MLS experience, were out of contract, and whose club did not wish to re-sign them (available for at least 105 percent of their 2013 salary).

Players who were not selected in the Stage 1 draft were made available for the Stage 2 draft. Clubs that selected players in Stage 2 had to negotiate a new salary with any player not under contract. Players not selected in either stage were free to negotiate with any club.

Teams also had the option of passing on their selection.

== Available players ==
Players were required to meet age and service requirements to participate as stipulated by the terms of the MLS Collective Bargaining Agreement. The league released a list of all players available for the draft on December 9, 2013.

Player	Position	Released By	Contract Status	Re-Entry Draft Result
Shaun Francis	D	Chicago Fire	Option Declined	Selected by San Jose Earthquakes in Stage 2, Round 1
Joel Lindpere	M	Chicago Fire	Option Declined	Not selected
Daniel Paladini	D	Chicago Fire	Option Declined	Traded to Columbus Crew prior to draft
Corben Bone	M	Chicago Fire	Option Declined	Selected by Philadelphia Union in Stage 1, Round 1
Logan Pause	M	Chicago Fire	Option Declined	Withdrew after Stage 1
Chris Rolfe	M	Chicago Fire	Option Declined	Re-signed with Chicago after Stage 1
Maicon Santos	F	Chicago Fire	Option Declined	Not selected
Wells Thompson	M	Chicago Fire	Out of Contract	Not selected
Michael Videira	M	Chicago Fire	Option Declined	Not selected
Ante Jazic	D	Chivas USA	Out of Contract	Not selected
Steve Purdy	D	Chivas USA	Option Declined	Not selected
Josue Soto	M	Chivas USA	Option Declined	Not selected
Steward Ceus	GK	Colorado Rapids	Option Declined	Not selected
Brian Mullan	D	Colorado Rapids	Option Declined	Not selected
Jamie Smith	M	Colorado Rapids	Option Declined	Not selected
Danny O'Rourke	M	Columbus Crew	Option Declined	Not selected
Konrad Warzycha	M	Columbus Crew	Option Declined	Not selected
Dwayne DeRosario	M	D.C. United	Option Declined	Selected by Toronto FC in Stage 2, Round 1
James Riley	D	D.C. United	Option Declined	Not selected
Carlos Ruiz	F	D.C. United	Option Declined	Not selected
Marcelo Saragosa	M	D.C. United	Option Declined	Not selected
John Thorrington	M	D.C. United	Option Declined	Withdrew after Stage 1
Daniel Woolard	D	D.C. United	Option Declined	Not selected
Kenny Cooper	F	FC Dallas	Option Declined	Withdrew prior to draft; subsequently traded to Seattle Sounders FC
David Ferreira	M	FC Dallas	Option Declined	Not selected
Ugo Ihemelu	D	FC Dallas	Option Declined	Not selected
Bobby Boswell	D	Houston Dynamo	Out of Contract	Selected by D.C. United in Stage 1, Round 2
Calen Carr	F	Houston Dynamo	Out of Contract	Not selected
Mike Chabala	D	Houston Dynamo	Option Declined	Withdrew prior to draft
Alex Dixon	M	Houston Dynamo	Option Declined	Not selected
Cam Weaver	F	Houston Dynamo	Option Declined	Not selected
Colin Clark	M	Los Angeles Galaxy	Option Declined	Not selected
Laurent Courtois	M	Los Angeles Galaxy	Option Declined	Not selected
Sean Franklin	D	Los Angeles Galaxy	Option Declined	Selected by D.C. United in Stage 1, Round 1
Pablo Mastroeni	M	Los Angeles Galaxy	Out of Contract	Retired prior to draft
Sinisa Ubiparipovic	M	Montreal Impact	Option Declined	Not selected
Kevin Alston	D	New England Revolution	Out of Contract	Withdrew prior to draft
Chad Barrett	F	New England Revolution	Option Declined	Selected by Seattle Sounders FC in Stage 2, Round 1
Ryan Guy	F	New England Revolution	Option Declined	Not selected
Clyde Simms	M	New England Revolution	Option Declined	Not selected
Juan Toja	M	New England Revolution	Option Declined	Not selected
Andre Akpan	F	New York Red Bulls	Out of Contract	Re-signed by New York prior to draft
Brandon Barklage	D	New York Red Bulls	Option Declined	Selected by San Jose Earthquakes in Stage 2, Round 2
Fabian Espindola	F	New York Red Bulls	Option Declined	Selected by D.C. United in Stage 2, Round 1
Kevin Hartman	G	New York Red Bulls	Option Declined	Retired prior to draft
Heath Pearce	D	New York Red Bulls	Out of Contract	Not selected
Chris Albright	D	Philadelphia Union	Out of Contract	Retired prior to draft
David Horst	D	Portland Timbers	Option Declined	Traded to Houston Dynamo after Stage 1
Ryan Miller	D	Portland Timbers	Option Declined	Not selected
Yordany Alvarez	M	Real Salt Lake	Option Declined	Withdrew prior to draft
Brandon McDonald	D	Real Salt Lake	Option Declined	Not selected
Josh Saunders	G	Real Salt Lake	Option Declined	Not selected
Khari Stephenson	M	Real Salt Lake	Option Declined	Not selected
Nana Attakora	D	San Jose Earthquakes	Option Declined	Selected by D.C. United in Stage 2, Round 2
Mehdi Ballouchy	M	San Jose Earthquakes	Out of Contract	Selected by Vancouver Whitecaps FC in Stage 2, Round 1
Dan Gargan	D	San Jose Earthquakes	Option Declined	Not selected
Evan Newton	GK	San Jose Earthquakes	Option Declined	Not selected
Marc Burch	D	Seattle Sounders FC	Option Declined	Selected by Colorado Rapids in Stage 1, Round 1
Josh Ford	GK	Seattle Sounders FC	Option Declined	Re-signed by Seattle prior to draft
Blair Gavin	M	Seattle Sounders FC	Option Declined	Not selected
Mauro Rosales	M	Seattle Sounders FC	Option Declined	Traded to Chivas USA prior to draft
Steve Zakuani	F	Seattle Sounders FC	Out of Contract	Selected by Portland Timbers in Stage 1, Round 1
Justin Braun	F	Toronto FC	Out of Contract	Not selected
Bobby Convey	M	Toronto FC	Option Declined	Withdrew prior to draft; subsequently traded to New York Red Bulls
Joe Cannon	GK	Vancouver Whitecaps FC	Option Declined	Not selected
Tommy Heinemann	F	Vancouver Whitecaps FC	Option Declined	Withdrew prior to draft
Corey Hertzog	F	Vancouver Whitecaps FC	Option Declined	Selected by Seattle Sounders FC in Stage 2, Round 2
Brad Knighton	GK	Vancouver Whitecaps FC	Option Declined	Traded to New England Revolution prior to draft

== Stage One ==
The first stage of the 2013 MLS Re-Entry Draft took place on December 12, 2013.

=== Round 1 ===
Pick #	Drafting Team	Player	Position	Former Team
1	D.C. United	Sean Franklin	DF	Los Angeles Galaxy
2	Portland Timbers (Note: #2: Chivas USA → Portland Timbers. 12 December 2013: Portland Timbers acquired the #2 selection in the 2013 Re-Entry Draft and midfielder Jorge Villafaña from Chivas USA in exchange for the #17 selection in the 2013 Re-Entry Draft and defender Andrew Jean-Baptiste. (Note: "Portland Timbers acquire Jorge Villafana, No. 2 selection in Re-Entry process from Chivas USA in exchange for Andrew Jean-Baptiste, No. 17 Re-Entry pick" (Press release). Portland Timbers Communications. December 12, 2013.))	Steve Zakuani	MF	Seattle Sounders FC
3	Toronto FC	PASS		
4	Columbus Crew	PASS		
5	FC Dallas	PASS		
6	Vancouver Whitecaps FC	PASS		
7	Philadelphia Union	Corben Bone	MF	Chicago Fire
8	Chicago Fire	PASS		
9	San Jose Earthquakes	PASS		
10	Montreal Impact	PASS		
11	Colorado Rapids	Marc Burch	DF	Seattle Sounders FC
12	New England Revolution	PASS		
13	Seattle Sounders FC	PASS		
14	Los Angeles Galaxy	PASS		
15	New York Red Bulls	PASS		
16	Houston Dynamo	PASS		
17	Chivas USA (Note: #17: Portland Timbers → Chivas USA. 12 December 2013: Chivas USA acquired the #17 selection in the 2013 Re-Entry Draft and defender Andrew Jean-Baptiste from Portland Timbers from Chivas USA in exchange for the #2 selection in the 2013 Re-Entry Draft and midfielder Jorge Villafaña.)	PASS		
18	Real Salt Lake	PASS		
19	Sporting Kansas City	PASS		

=== Round 2 ===
Only teams which selected a player in Round 1 were eligible for a pick in Round 2.

Pick #	Drafting Team	Player	Position	Former Team
1	D.C. United	Bobby Boswell	DF	Houston Dynamo
2	Portland Timbers	PASS		
3	Philadelphia Union	PASS		
4	Colorado Rapids	PASS		

=== Round 3 ===
Only teams which selected a player in Rounds 1 and 2 were eligible for a pick in Round 3.

Pick #	Drafting Team	Player	Position	Former Team
1	D.C. United	PASS		

== Stage Two ==
The second stage of the 2013 MLS Re-Entry Draft took place on December 18, 2013.

=== Round 1 ===
Pick #	Drafting Team	Player	Position	Former Team
1	D.C. United	Fabián Espíndola	FW	New York Red Bulls
2	Chivas USA	PASS		
3	Toronto FC	Dwayne De Rosario	MF	D.C. United
4	Columbus Crew	PASS		
5	FC Dallas	PASS		
6	Philadelphia Union	PASS		
7	Vancouver Whitecaps FC	Mehdi Ballouchy	MF	San Jose Earthquakes
8	Chicago Fire	PASS		
9	San Jose Earthquakes	Shaun Francis	MF	Chicago Fire
10	Montreal Impact	PASS		
11	Colorado Rapids	PASS		
12	New England Revolution	PASS		
13	Seattle Sounders FC	Chad Barrett	FW	New England Revolution
14	Los Angeles Galaxy	PASS		
15	New York Red Bulls	PASS		
16	Houston Dynamo	PASS		
17	Portland Timbers	PASS		
18	Real Salt Lake	PASS		
19	Sporting Kansas City	PASS		

=== Round 2 ===
Only teams which selected a player in Round 1 were eligible for a pick in Round 2.

Pick #	Drafting Team	Player	Position	Former Team
1	D.C. United	Nana Attakora	DF	San Jose Earthquakes
2	Toronto FC	PASS		
3	Vancouver Whitecaps FC	PASS		
4	San Jose Earthquakes	Brandon Barklage	DF	New York Red Bulls
5	Seattle Sounders FC	Corey Hertzog	FW	Vancouver Whitecaps FC

=== Round 3 ===
Only teams which selected a player in Rounds 1 and 2 were eligible for a pick in Round 3.

Pick #	Drafting Team	Player	Position	Former Team
1	D.C. United	PASS		
2	San Jose Earthquakes	PASS		
3	Seattle Sounders FC	PASS		
