= Jeanderson =

Brazilian footballer

Personal information
- Full name: Jeanderson Salvador Pereira
- Date of birth: August 13, 1991 (age 35)
- Place of birth: Serra, Brazil
- Height: 1.80 m (5 ft 11 in)
- Position: Left-back

Team information
- Current team: Serra

Youth career
- Serra

Senior career*
Years	Team	Apps	(Gls)
2009	Ferroviária		
2010–2011	Rio Branco-ES		
2011	Vitória-ES		
2012	Serra		
2013	São José-PA	2	(0)
2014	Cruzeiro-RS	15	(0)
2014	Santa Rita	4	(0)
2015	Portland Timbers	3	(0)
2015	→ Portland Timbers 2 (loan)	14	(1)
2016	Sampaio Corrêa	5	(0)
2017	Ferroviário	14	(0)
2017	Náutico	4	(0)
2017	Bonsucesso	11	(0)
2018	Cuiabá	0	(0)
2018	ASA	4	(0)
2019	Resende	15	(0)
2019	Tubarão	5	(0)
2019	→ Sampaio Corrêa (loan)	8	(0)
2020	Nova Iguaçu	9	(0)
2020	Bonsucesso	5	(0)
2020	Estrela do Norte	2	(0)
2021	Resende	5	(0)
2021	Estrela do Norte	4	(0)
2021	Cabofriense	11	(0)
2021	Rio Branco-ES	9	(0)
2022	CSE	3	(0)
2023	Nona FC	0	(0)
2024	Murici FC	0	(0)
2024–	Serra	14	(0)
- * Club domestic league appearances and goals as of 21:16, 26 February 2022 (UTC)

Jeanderson Salvador Pereira (born August 13, 1991) is a Brazilian professional footballer who plays as a left-back for Serra.

== Career ==
After spending his career in his native Brazil, Jeanderson signed with MLS club Portland Timbers on December 8, 2014.

On December 7, 2015, Jeanderson's contract was declined with the Portland Timbers.

== Honours ==
Portland Timbers

- MLS Cup: 2015
- Western Conference (playoffs): 2015
