= Norberto Paparatto =

Argentine footballer

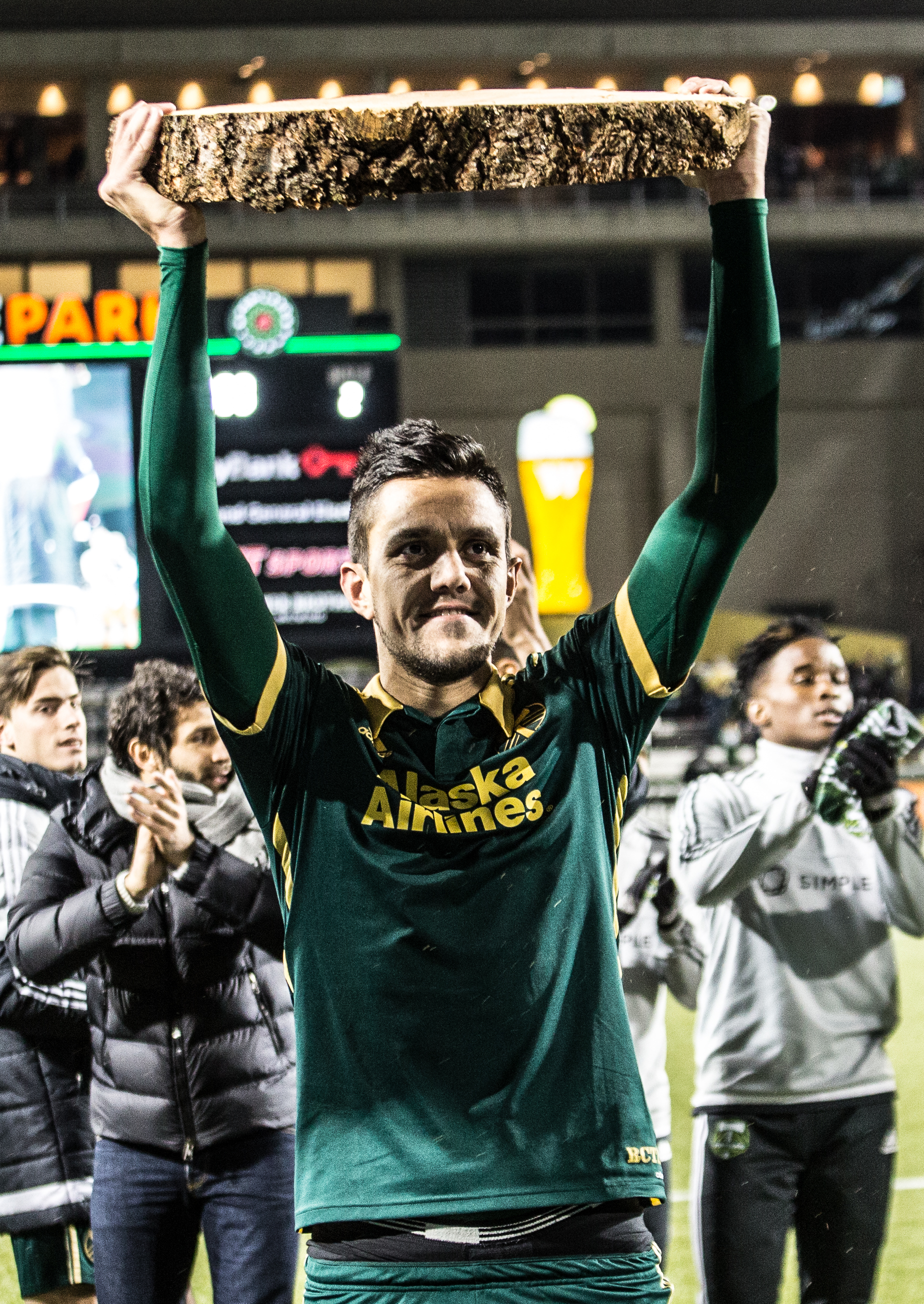

Personal information
- Full name: Norberto Javier Paparatto
- Date of birth: January 3, 1984 (age 42)
- Place of birth: Adrogué, Argentina
- Height: 1.92 m (6 ft 4 in)
- Position: Centre-back

Team information
- Current team: Almagro (Manager)

Youth career
- Lanús

Senior career*
| Years | Team | Apps | (Gls) |
| 2005–2006 | Lanús | 2 | (0) |
| 2006–2007 | Tiro Federal | 19 | (1) |
| 2007–2014 | Tigre | 126 | (1) |
| 2014–2015 | Portland Timbers | 19 | (0) |
| 2015 | → Portland Timbers 2 (loan) | 1 | (0) |
| 2016 | Atlético Rafaela | 5 | (0) |
| 2016 | FC Dallas | 0 | (0) |
| 2017–2018 | Almagro | 9 | (0) |
| 2018–2019 | Mitre | 17 | (1) |
| 2019–2021 | Almagro | 21 | (0) |

Managerial career
- 2022: Almagro
- * Club domestic league appearances and goals

Norberto Javier Paparatto (born 3 January 1984) is a retired Argentine footballer. His most recent role as manager was for Almagro.

== Career ==
Paparatto started his career with Lanús in 2005, but he only made two appearances for the club before joining Tiro Federal of the Argentine 2nd division. In 2007, he made his return to the Primera División Argentina, joining Tigre and helping them achieve their best ever league finish of 2nd place in the Apertura 2007 tournament. In the 2011–2012 season, he helped Tigre once again achieve a 2nd-place finish in league. He also helped the club finish runners-up in the 2012 Copa Sudamericana. Paparatto was named Tigre's captain ahead of the 2013–14 season.

On January 15, 2014, Paparatto signed with Major League Soccer (MLS) club Portland Timbers. He won the 2015 MLS Cup with the Timbers. In 2016, he played for Atlético de Rafaela and FC Dallas, although he made no official appearances for Dallas.

== Coaching career ==
On 5 November 2021, Paparatto announced that he would retire at the end of the year. On 25 March 2022, he was appointed manager of Club Almagro, replacing Walter Perazzo.

== Honours ==
=== Club ===
Portland Timbers

- MLS Cup: 2015
- Western Conference (playoffs): 2015
