= Steve Zakuani =

Congolese footballer

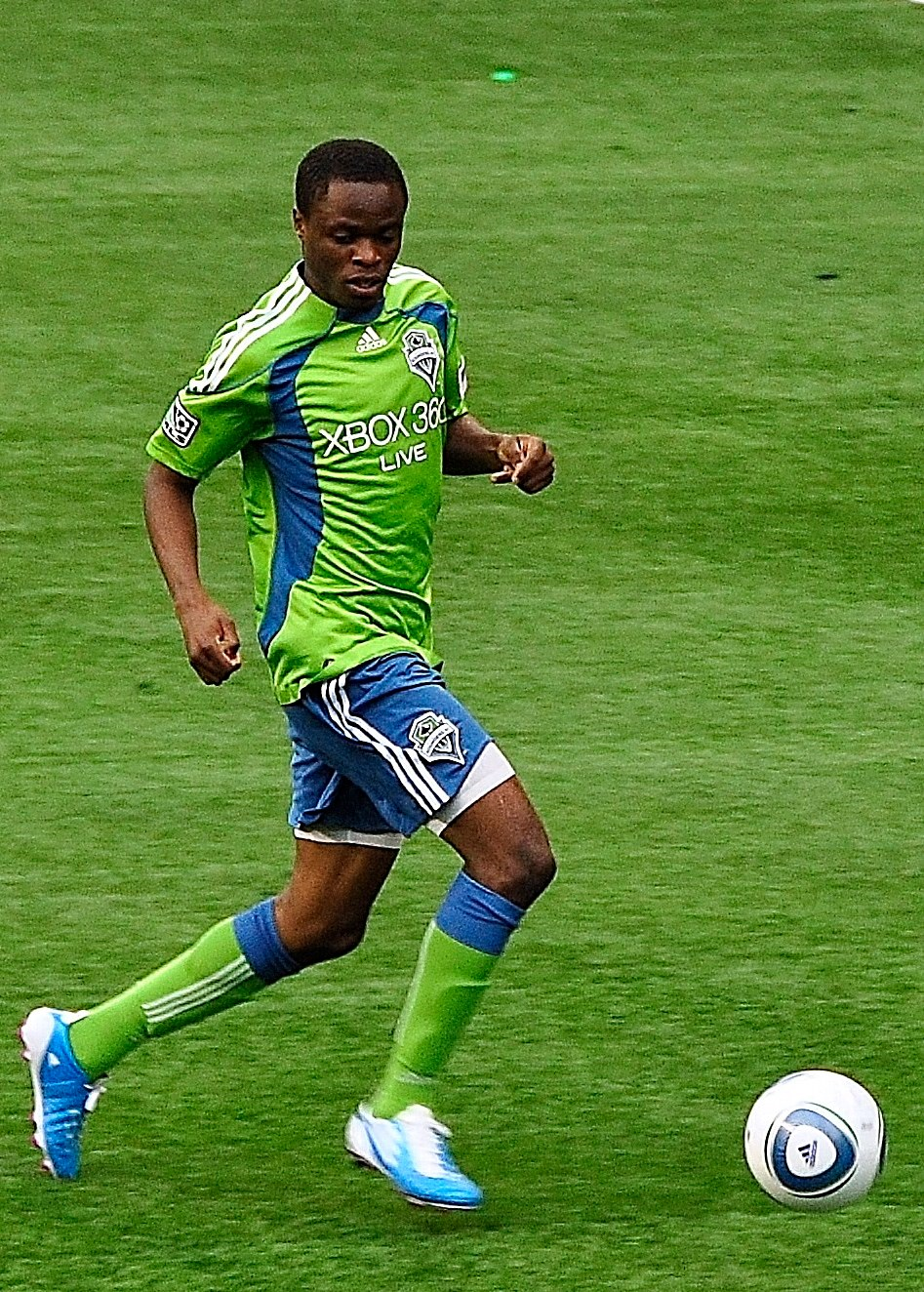
- Zakuani playing for Seattle Sounders FC in 2010

Personal information
- Date of birth: 9 February 1988 (age 38)
- Place of birth: Kinshasa, Zaire
- Height: 6 ft 0 in (1.83 m)
- Position: Winger

Youth career
- 1997–2003: Arsenal

College career
Years	Team	Apps	(Gls)
2007–2008	Akron Zips	44	(26)

Senior career*
Years	Team	Apps	(Gls)
2008	Cleveland Internationals	11	(9)
2009–2013	Seattle Sounders FC	80	(17)
2014	Portland Timbers	17	(0)
Total		108	(26)

International career
2010	DR Congo	1	(0)

Managerial career
- 2015–2016: Tacoma Stars (assistant)
- 2019–: Bellevue Wolverines
- * Club domestic league appearances and goals

Steve Zakuani (born 9 February 1988) is a Congolese former footballer. He was born in Zaire—now the Democratic Republic of the Congo—and grew up in London. After a successful college career, he played for the Seattle Sounders FC and the Portland Timbers.

Zakuani played for the Arsenal youth academy, but then struggled finding a team. He attended the University of Akron on a soccer scholarship, excelling as a forward. In 2009, Seattle selected Zakuani with the first overall pick in the MLS SuperDraft. He quickly became a fan favorite as a winger with the speed and ability to take on opposing defenders.

Success continued in 2010 with Zakuani scoring ten goals and debuting for the Congo DR national football team in a friendly. However, in 2011, he suffered an almost career-ending leg injury. He failed to recapture his early success upon returning in 2012, before retiring after playing the 2014 MLS season with the Portland Timbers. After his retirement from soccer, Zakuani helps young athletes through charity work, joined the Sounders' game-day broadcast team, and coaches at Bellevue High School.

== Career ==
=== Youth and college ===
Zakuani was born in Kinshasa, Zaire—now the Democratic Republic of the Congo. When he was four, his father, Mao Zakuani, moved his family to London, for both political and professional reasons, as a translator. The family switched homes often and lived with extended family for long periods. They eventually settled in a north London neighborhood with other African families, where Zakuani attended White Hart Lane School.

At the age of nine, Zakuani attracted interest from West Ham United's youth program. He later tried out for Queens Park Rangers's youth team, and joined the Arsenal Academy in 1997. Zakuani became cocky and brash while not focusing on schoolwork before being released. His off-the-field issues culminated in serious injuries when he was involved in a crash on a stolen moped. Zakuani was unable to play for 18 months. After losing interest in soccer and renewing his scholastic efforts, he watched motivational speaker, and evangelist, Myles Munroe with a teacher. This inspired Zakuani to renew his commitment to becoming a professional player and, although unsuccessful, he tried out for the senior teams of Queens Park Rangers, Wigan Athletic, AZ Alkmaar, and Real Valladolid.

Zakuani attended the University of Akron after he was noticed while playing at north London's Independent Football Academy. In his freshman season, he scored six goals with the Zips and received a professional offer from Preston North End. He was already committed to the university and declined the opportunity. In 2008, Zakuani scored 20 goals and 7 assists over 23 games to become a finalist for the Hermann Trophy; an award given yearly by the Missouri Athletic Club to the country's top college soccer player. He also became the second sophomore to be named Soccer America's men's collegiate player of the year. He played a portion of the 2008 USL Premier Development League season with the Cleveland Internationals, with whom he scored nine goals and made four assists in 11 matches.

=== Professional ===
==== Seattle Sounders FC ====
Zakuani was selected by expansion side Seattle Sounders FC as the number-one pick in the 2009 MLS SuperDraft on a Generation Adidas program contract. He declined offers from two English clubs so he could sign with Major League Soccer; the deal allowed him to set money aside for future college tuition. He started 24 of 30 regular season games in 2009 and played in the Lamar Hunt U.S. Open Cup final, when the Sounders became the second MLS team to win the tournament in their inaugural season. Zakuani provided a much-needed attacking presence from the wing; he was the third-best scorer with four goals throughout the regular season. The press considered him a candidate for Rookie of the Year because he had the highest number of goals and assists of all new players. The award eventually went to Omar Gonzalez. A local reporter praised him for improving his assistance to the defence and making better offensive runs as the season progressed. Although Zakuani was already known as a top young player, coach Sigi Schmid wanted him to improve his on-field decision making and increase his fitness before the next year.

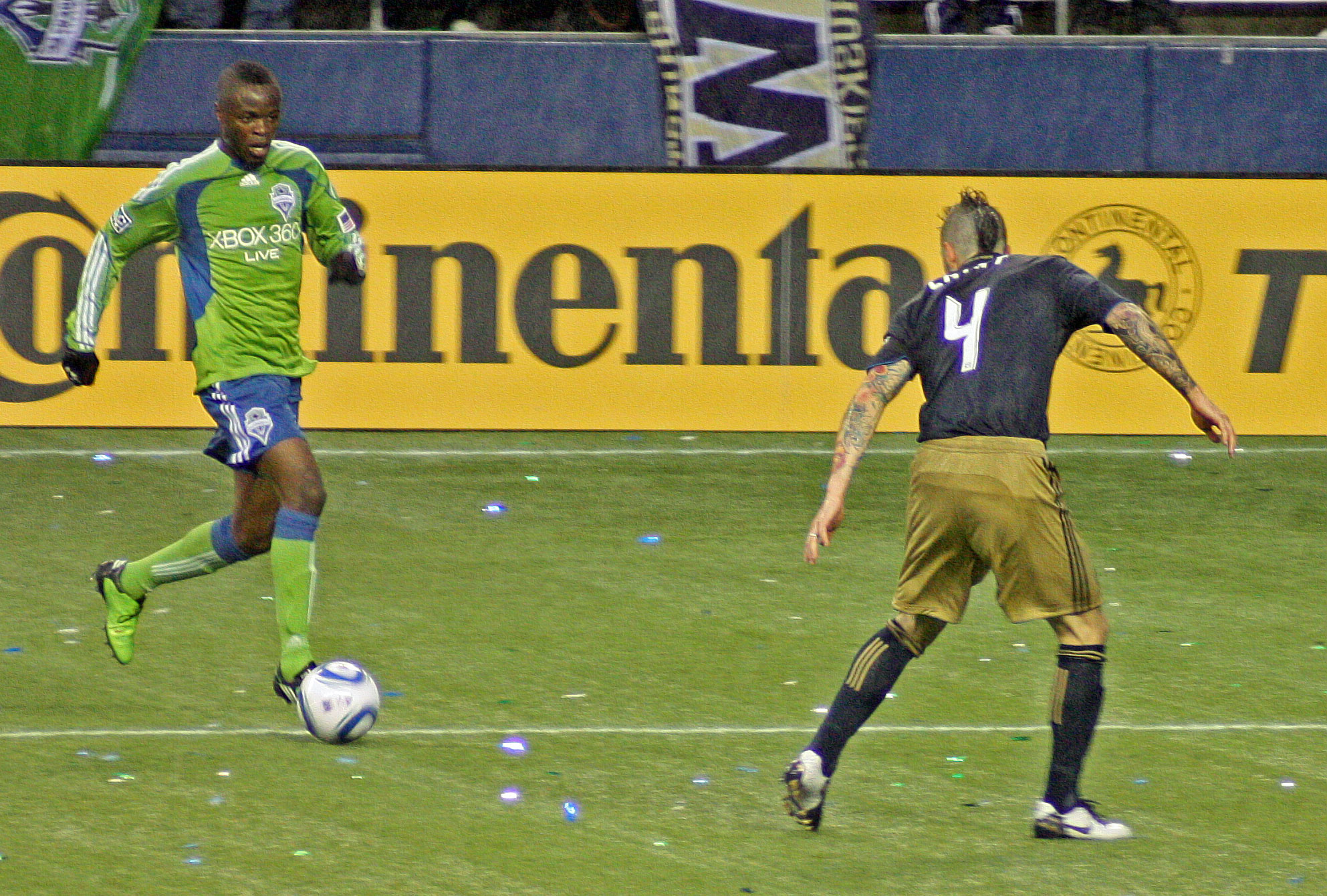
Zakuani against Philadelphia in 2010.

In 2009, a shoulder injury that had limited Zakuani's ability to play the full 90 minutes per game forced him to undergo surgery during the off-season. In his second professional year, Zakuani scored ten goals, equalling the score of striker Fredy Montero for the team lead. He also made six assists. Zakuani was named MLS Player of the Week twice; the first was after recording both goals in a 2–1 win over Colorado, and the second was awarded for both a goal and an assist in a 2–1 victory over Chivas USA. Fans around the league voted the strike against Chivas as the Goal of the Week. Zakuani also won the award for his perfectly timed break past the defensive back line for a one-on-one situation with the goalkeeper while scoring a goal against Toronto FC. He also recorded the fastest-scored goal in club history with a fourth-minute tally against Columbus Crew, beating the previous record he had set the season before. Zakuani was again in the starting line-up for the 2010 U.S. Open Cup final, which Seattle won to become the first team since 1983 to repeat as Open Cup champions. On 7 November 2010, he scored the Sounders' first ever playoff goal in a 2–1 loss to the Los Angeles Galaxy. He received his green card after the season; this helped the team because MLS limits the number of international players available to each team and receiving permanent resident status exempted him from the cap.

Zakuani scored two goals and had two assists in his first six appearances of the 2011 season. On 22 April 2011, a harsh challenge by Brian Mullan led to Zakuani fracturing his tibia and fibula three minutes into a game against the Colorado Rapids. He was airlifted to hospital and underwent surgery the same day. During recovery, doctors feared that his leg would require amputation because of compartment syndrome. The concern was caused by a lack of blood flow that hurt the nerves connecting the area to his foot. Mullan initially defended the tackle, saying he would make the challenge again. He later apologized in the face of increasing scrutiny and received a 10-game suspension (matching the longest ban in MLS history to date) and a $5,000 fine. Nelson Rodriguez, an executive vice president of MLS, said in a statement that the disciplinary committee "felt the egregious nature" of Mullan's foul justified the punishment. 'Mullan's tackle is the type of play we need to eliminate from our game, and the level of discipline is consistent with our efforts to do so.' Zakuani missed the remainder of the season, and this injury marked the beginning of the end of his career as a starter in pro soccer. Zakuani's injury was one of several to key players throughout the league that year, leading to criticism that MLS play was aggressive to the point of "thuggery".

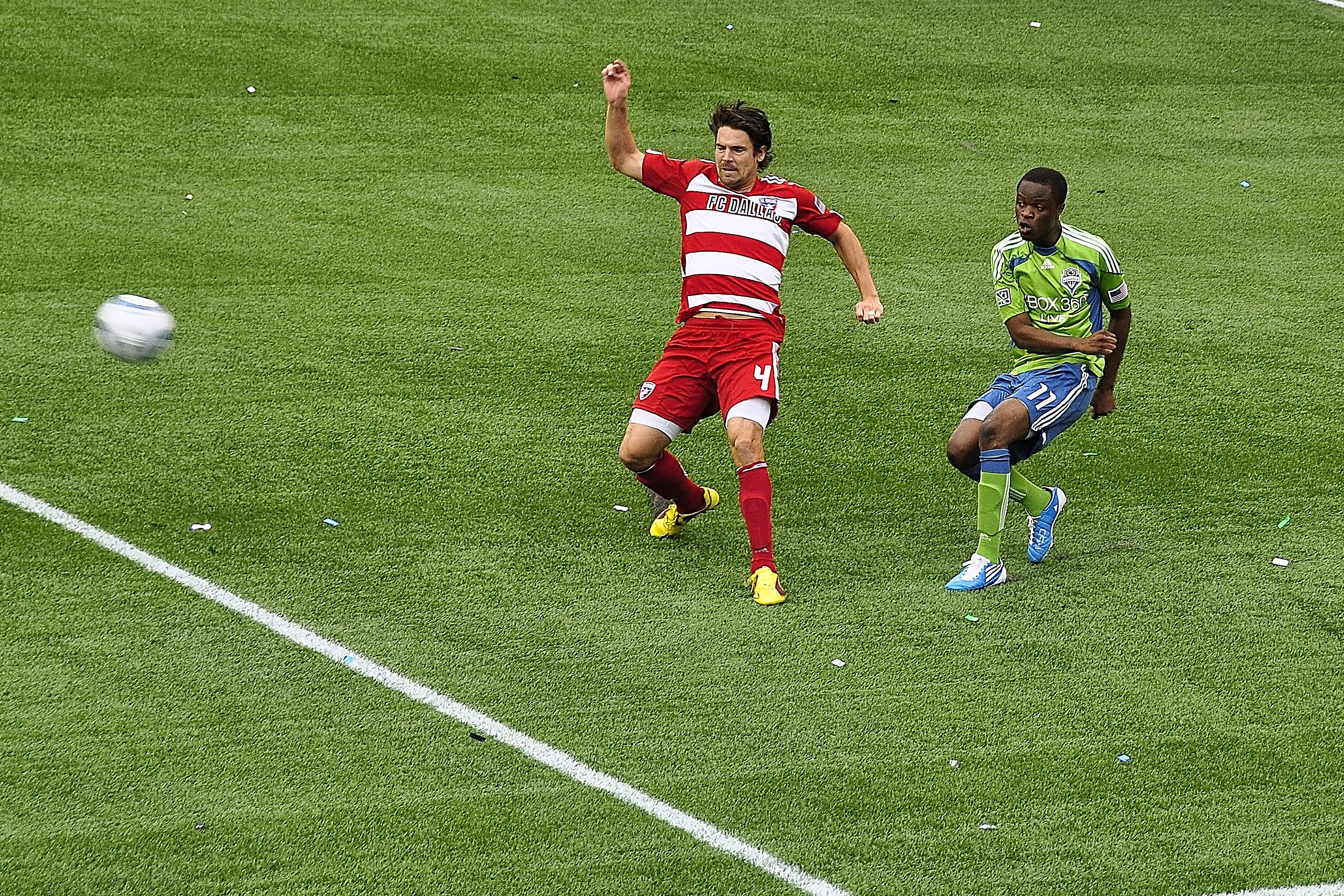
Zakuani against Dallas in 2011.

On 7 July 2012, after 15 months away, Zakuani returned in a match against Mullan and the Rapids. His return as a substitute with five minutes left in the game met provoked emotional cheers from the fans. Having already publicly forgiven Mullan, the two hugged and exchanged shirts after the whistle. Within two months, he appeared to further his recovery with an assist against FC Dallas and then scored a goal against San Jose Earthquakes. He finished the 2012 season with one goal in 320 minutes over eight matches and went on to play in three playoff games before the team was eliminated.

During the 2013 season, Zakuani made only nine appearances across all competitions before being sidelined with a sports hernia. In that time, he recorded one assist in league play, and assisting in the game-winning goal against Mexico's Tigres UANL in the CONCACAF Champions League quarterfinals. He was later placed on injured reserve and twice underwent surgery on each side of his groin. Zakuani's contract was allowed to expire, effectively ending his five-year career with the Sounders, during which he started in 67 of 78 appearances in league play. At the time, he was the club's third-leading scorer with 17 goals.

In January 2017, The Seattle Times reported that Zakuani had been training with the team for some time, with coach Brian Schmetzer describing his situation as "somewhere between a 'trial' and just pure training". A month later, he announced that he would not return to professional soccer and instead continue his broadcasting duties with the Sounders.

==== Portland Timbers ====
On 12 December 2013, Zakuani was selected by Portland Timbers as the number two pick in the MLS Re-Entry Draft; a yearly draft that allows teams to select players who are out-of-contract or have had their options declined by their current teams. The Timbers traded up for the opportunity. Zakuani was reunited with Caleb Porter, his former Akron coach, who had become the Portland manager. His pay was cut by $60,000 to $120,000 a year. Zakuani was expected to receive additional minutes immediately because first-choice winger Rodney Wallace was recovering from injury. Zakuani appeared in the Timbers' opening match of 2014 against Philadelphia Union as a substitute in the 85th minute. The Sounders and Timbers are fierce rivals; when the teams met in the 2014 Lamar Hunt U.S. Open Cup. Zakuani assisted former college team-mate Darlington Nagbe in the Timbers' only goal during the 3–1 loss to his previous club. Zakuani scored his first goal for Timbers on 19 August 2014, scoring the opening goal in a 4–1 win over Alpha United in the 2014–15 CONCACAF Champions League. After the match, Porter spoke to the media about the need to bench Zakuani because of his persistent muscle strains.

It's gotten to the point where I have to be honest with myself and listen to my body.

— Zakuani announcing his retirement.

2014 was disappointing for Zakuani; he scored no goals and only three assists. On 29 October 2014, Zakuani announced his retirement in a blog post. Having scored only one goal and five assists in the previous three seasons, he cited his difficulty recovering from numerous injuries. He had lost much of his precision, pace, and confidence since being hurt. He retired at the relatively early age of 26; his retirement after his initial promise led Sports Illustrated to describe his career as a "roller coaster".

=== International ===
Zakuani was eligible to play for both Congo and England. He considers London his hometown but still sees himself as Congolese. Of his five siblings, as of April 2015, his older brother Gabriel Zakuani plays for English club Northampton Town and is a member of the Congolese national team. He might have been able to play for the United States if granted citizenship. He expressed interest in representing the Congolese national team early in his professional career, but considered his chances of playing for England "a long shot". Later in his career, he expressed interest in playing for the United States, saying, "of the three, I prefer the States as this is where I made my name as a player".

In 2010, Zakuani accepted a call up from Congo for a friendly match against Mali. In a press release, Zakuani called it the highest honor of his young career. It was a challenging decision for him but the wait to become eligible to play for the United States was too long. The game was played in Dieppe, France, in November 2010. Zakuani started the match and came off at half-time with Congo in the lead. Mali rallied in the second half, beating Congo in a 3–1 loss.

== Playing style ==
Speedy, inventive, and with plenty of flair.

— Description of Zakuani's play in Sports Illustrated.

Zakuani was a right-footed player who preferred being on the left of the field. He played on the left wing in a 4–4–2 formation with Arsenal; later he was a forward in college before converting to a winger professionally. Zakuani said he played with a style he learned at Arsenal's youth academy and that he tried to emulate the style of former winger Robert Pires. Zakuani often sought advice from former Arsenal star Freddie Ljungberg when they played together in Seattle. Zakuani was a quick, agile player who liked to take defenders one-on-one. While coaching him at Akron, Porter said many of Zakuani's goals came after long runs that beat multiple players.

== Personal life and retirement ==
After retiring in 2014, Zakuani joined the Sounders broadcast team as an analyst and later color commentator. He declined to join Apple TV's MLS Season Pass, which replaced local broadcasts in 2023, due to the national travel schedule. He published a memoir, "500 Days", in 2015 and a documentary in 2018 that chronicled his recovery from the 2011 injury.

Zakuani served as an assistant coach for the Tacoma Stars, an indoor team in the Major Arena Soccer League, from 2015 to 2016. He became the head coach at Bellevue High School in 2019, taking the team to a league championship.

=== Kingdom Hope ===
As a teenager in London, Zakuani began "mixing with the wrong crowd". He was distracted from soccer by girls and parties. He said in an interview, "A lot of the people I grew up with ended up in prison, taking drugs, and never made it to university". He has strong feelings about the increase of knife crime in London since one of his friends was killed. In 2010, he founded the non-profit organization Kingdom Hope to run youth soccer camps in the greater Seattle area. He remembers being focused on soccer instead of education in Europe; the organization is focused on providing collegiate scholarships to young athletes. Zakuani has said his ultimate goal is to open an academy to teach life-coaching and soccer to teenagers to provide a "bridge between talent and actually making it".

== Career statistics ==
As of match played 3 November 2014

Appearances and goals by club, season and competition
Club	Season	League			U.S. Open Cup		Continental		Other		Total	
Club	Season	Division	Apps	Goals	Apps	Goals	Apps	Goals	Apps	Goals	Apps	Goals
Cleveland Internationals	2008	USL Premier Development League	11	9	—		—		—		11	9
Seattle Sounders FC	2009	Major League Soccer	29	4	4	0	—		2 (Note: Appearances in MLS Cup playoffs)	0	35	4
Seattle Sounders FC	2010	Major League Soccer	29	10	3	0	3 (Note: Appearance(s) in CONCACAF Champions League)	0	2	1	37	11
Seattle Sounders FC	2011	Major League Soccer	6	2	0	0	0	0	0	0	6	2
Seattle Sounders FC	2012	Major League Soccer	8	1	0	0	1	1	3	0	12	2
Seattle Sounders FC	2013	Major League Soccer	8	0	0	0	3	0	0	0	11	0
Seattle Sounders FC	Total		80	17	7	0	7	1	7	1	100	19
Portland Timbers	2014	Major League Soccer	17	0	2	0	1	1	—		20	1
Career total			108	26	9	0	8	2	7	1	131	29

== Honors ==
Seattle Sounders

- U.S. Open Cup: 2009, 2010
