= Shaun Francis =

Jamaican footballer (born 1986)

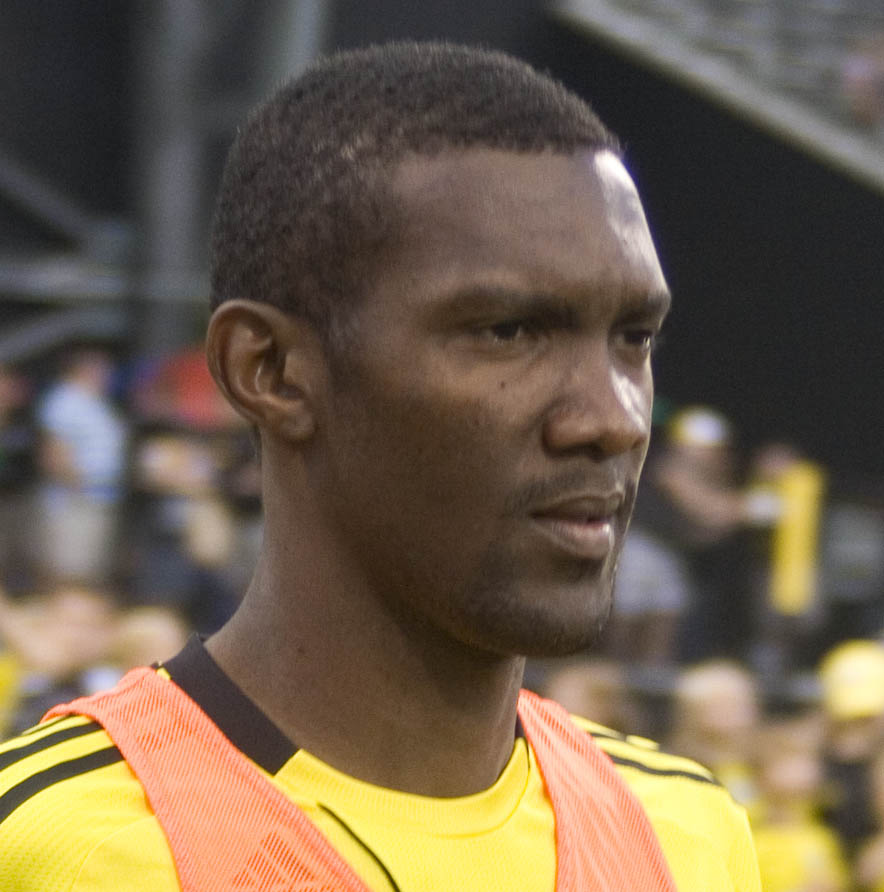
- Francis with Columbus Crew in 2010

Personal information
- Full name: Shaun Francis
- Date of birth: 2 October 1986 (age 40)
- Place of birth: Mandeville, Jamaica
- Height: 6 ft 0 in (1.83 m)
- Position: Defender

Youth career
- 2004–2006: Sporting Central Academy

College career
Years	Team	Apps	(Gls)
2006–2009	Lindsey Wilson Blue Raiders		

Senior career*
Years	Team	Apps	(Gls)
2008	Indiana Invaders	2	(0)
2009	Thunder Bay Chill	12	(3)
2010–2012	Columbus Crew	28	(0)
2013	Charlotte Eagles	12	(3)
2013	Chicago Fire	1	(0)
2014–2017	San Jose Earthquakes	69	(0)
2017	Montreal Impact	6	(0)
2018–2019	Louisville City	32	(0)

International career^{‡}
2010–	Jamaica	11	(3)
Medal record
Men's football
Representing Jamaica
CONCACAF Gold Cup
Runner-up	2017 United States	Team
- * Club domestic league appearances and goals as of 23 October 2019 ‡ National team caps and goals as of 21 July 2017

Shaun Francis (born 2 October 1986) is a Jamaican footballer who last played for Louisville City FC in the USL Championship.

== Early life ==
=== Personal ===
Francis was born in Mandeville, Jamaica to Joy and Carlton Francis. He attended Glenmuir High School where he played soccer. While at Glenmuir he was an All-Island, Ben Francis Cup, and Dá Costa Cup Champion, as well as a member of an All-Conference Team.

=== College and Youth ===
Francis played three years of college soccer at Lindsey Wilson College between 2007 and 2009 entering as a Sophomore. As a Sophomore he appeared in 21 matches and scored his first collegiate goal on 29 October against Campbellsville University. His only goal of the season. As a Junior he appeared in 18 matches and scored three goals. Prior to his Senior season Francis was named a team captain and appeared in 22 matches once again scoring three goals. Lindsey Wilson and Francis went on to win the 2009 NAIA Men's Soccer Championship with Francis being named to the All-Mid South first team.

During his college years Francis also played with both the Indiana Invaders and the Thunder Bay Chill in the USL Premier Development League. In 2008 he made two appearances with the Indiana Invaders going goalless. In 2009 he made twelve appearances with the Thunder Bay Chill while scoring three goals as Thunder Bay finished second in the Heartland division.

== Club career ==
=== Columbus Crew ===
==== 2010 season ====
Needing a left footed defender the Columbus Crew selected Francis in the fourth round (63rd overall) of the 2010 MLS SuperDraft. Trading Stefani Miglioranzi to the LA Galaxy to acquire the pick used to select him. He was signed by the Crew in March to fill one of the club's four developmental roster spots, but slowed by an ankle injury would not make his professional debut until 7 July in a U.S. Open Cup match against Charleston. He would make his MLS league debut ten days later against New York Red Bulls on 17 July and went on to appear in 12 of Columbus' 30 matches as Columbus finished second in the Eastern Conference. He also appeared in both of Columbus' MLS Cup matches and three of four U.S. Open Cup. Including the Open Cup Final against Seattle. A match Columbus lost 2–1. Francis also made his debut in International Club competition when he appeared in all six of Columbus' matches in the 2010–11 CONCACAF Champions League Group Stage. He would go goalless across all competitions.

==== 2011 season ====
Francis remained with Columbus for the 2011 season and made his season debut on 4 June against the New York Red Bulls. He went on to appear in 6 of Columbus' league matches but did not appear in any other competition.

==== 2012 season ====
Francis began the 2012 season with Columbus and made his season debut on 10 March against Colorado. He would appear in ten of Columbus' league matches as well as one match in the U.S. Open Cup before being waived in June 2017 due to roster constraints. He would not sign with another team in 2012.

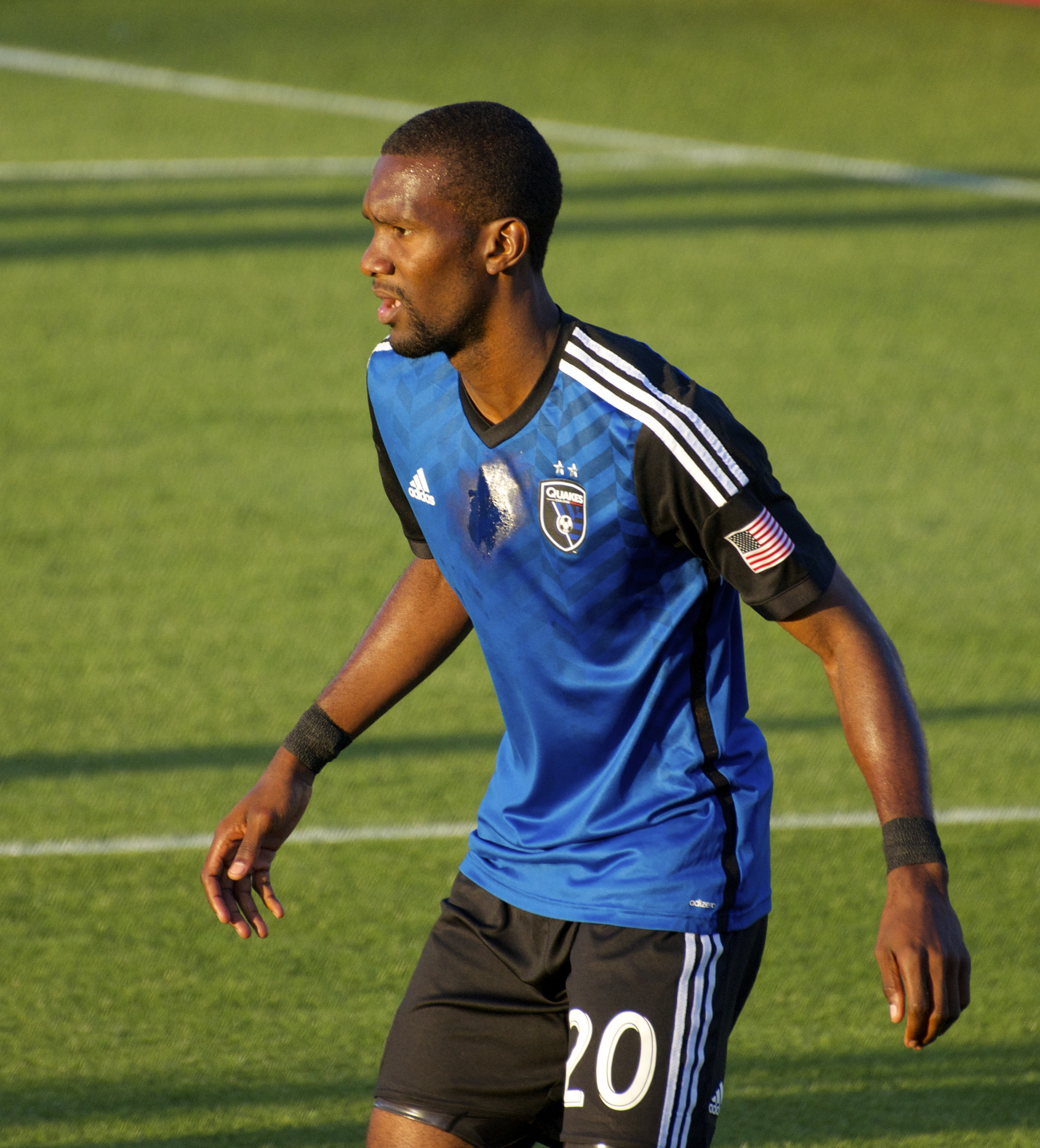
Francis with the San Jose Earthquakes in 2014

=== Charlotte Eagles ===
Francis signed with USL Pro side Charlotte Eagles on 27 March for the 2013 season. He made his USL Pro debut on 13 April against Antigua and scored his first professional goal on 5 May against Richmond. He appeared in twelve of Charlotte's first fifteen matches scoring three goals with two assists as well as appearing in one U.S. Open Cup match.

=== Chicago Fire ===
On 10 July Francis signed with the Chicago Fire of Major League Soccer for the remainder of the 2013 season. He would make only appearance with Chicago's first team; a 1–3 defeat against Vancouver.

=== San Jose Earthquakes ===
==== 2014 season ====
At the conclusion of 2013, Chicago declined its contract option on Francis and he entered the 2013 MLS Re-Entry Draft. Francis was selected in stage two of the draft by San Jose Earthquakes and he signed with the club in January. He would make his San Jose debut in the season opener against Real Salt Lake and appeared in 20 of San Jose's 34 league matches as San Jose finished last in the Western Conference. He appeared in the CONCACAF Champions League for the first time since 2010 when he appeared in the second leg against Deportivo Toluca F.C. in the championship stage. A match that San Jose would lose on penalties. He also appeared in both of San Jose's U.S. Open Cup matches and went goalless across all competitions.

==== 2015 season ====
Francis remained with San Jose for the 2015 season and made his season debut on 7 March in the season opener against FC Dallas. He appeared in 23 of San Jose's 34 league matches without scoring a goal as San Jose finished seventh in the Western Conference; missing the MLS Cup playoffs. Francis also appeared in both of San Jose's U.S. Open Cup matches. Although he didn't score in regulation time during either of the U.S. Open Cup he did convert the final shot of the Penalty shoot-out against Sacramento Republic FC of the USL.

==== 2016 season ====
Francis remained with San Jose for the 2016 season and made his season debut on 6 March in the season opener against Colorado. He appeared in 18 of San Jose's 34 league matches without scoring a goal as San Jose finished ninth in the Western Conference; missing the MLS Cup playoffs.

==== 2017 season ====
Francis began the 2017 season with San Jose, made his season debut on 4 March in the season opener against Montreal, and appeared in San Jose's first eight games. On 13 July while with the Jamaica national team he was traded to the Montreal Impact for general allocation money.

=== Montreal Impact ===
On 13 July, Francis was traded to the Montreal Impact of MLS where he finished the remainder of the 2017 season. He made his Montreal debut on 5 August against Orlando and appeared in six of Montreal's last fourteen league matches without scoring.

=== Louisville City ===
The Impact opted not to re-sign Francis following the 2017 season and on 9 March he signed with USL side Louisville City FC. He made his Louisville debut on 17 March against Nashville and appeared in 17 of Louisville's 34 league matches. He also made his first appearance in the U.S. Open Cup since 2015 when he came on as a substitute against both Nashville and the Chicago Fire. Helping Louisville reach the quarter finals of the U.S. Open Cup for the first in its history. Although he did not make an appearance in the USL Cup playoffs he was named to the match squad for all four of Louisville's matches as Francis and Louisville won the USL Cup Final.

== International ==
Francis earned his first cap for Jamaica national team squad during a friendly game against Trinidad and Tobago on 10 October 2010. Francis scored his first senior national team goal in a 2–0 victory over Guadeloupe in the 2010 Caribbean Championship on 29 November 2010.

=== International goals ===
Scores and results list Jamaica's goal tally first.

No	Date	Venue	Opponent	Score	Result	Competition
1.	29 November 2010	Stade En Camée, Rivière-Pilote, Martinique	Guadeloupe	1–0	2–0	2010 Caribbean Cup
2.	11 October 2016	Leonora Stadium, Leonora, Guyana	Guyana	3–2	4–2	2017 Caribbean Cup qualification
3.	20 July 2017	University of Phoenix Stadium, Glendale, United States	Canada	1–0	2–1	2017 CONCACAF Gold Cup

== Honours ==
=== Club ===
Columbus Crew SC

- Lamar Hunt U.S. Open Cup Runners-up (1): 2010

Louisville City FC

- USL Cup (1): 2018

=== International ===
Jamaica

- Caribbean Cup: 2010
- CONCACAF Gold Cup Runner-up: 2017
