= Gastón Fernández =

Argentine footballer

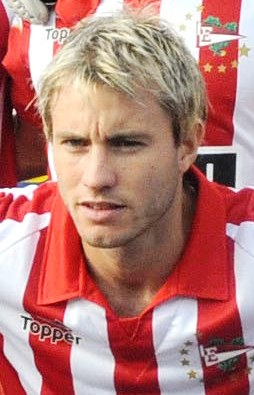
- Fernández with Estudiantes in 2010

Personal information
- Full name: Gastón Nicolás Fernández
- Date of birth: 12 October 1983 (age 43)
- Place of birth: Lanús, Argentina
- Height: 1.70 m (5 ft 7 in)
- Position: Forward

Youth career
- River Plate

Senior career*
Years	Team	Apps	(Gls)
2002–2006	River Plate	50	(6)
2003–2004	→ Racing Club (loan)	25	(7)
2006	→ Monterrey (loan)	28	(8)
2007	San Lorenzo	30	(10)
2008–2010	UANL	23	(11)
2008–2009	→ Estudiantes (loan)	27	(3)
2010–2014	Estudiantes	93	(21)
2014–2015	Portland Timbers	53	(9)
2015	→ Portland Timbers 2 (loan)	1	(0)
2015–2016	Estudiantes	26	(9)
2016	Universidad de Chile	19	(7)
2017	Grêmio	11	(0)
2017–2020	Estudiantes	48	(4)
- * Club domestic league appearances and goals

Gastón Nicolás Fernández (born 12 October 1983) is an Argentine former professional footballer who played as a forward. He spent most of his senior club career in Argentine Primera División side Estudiantes.

== Club career ==
Nicknamed La Gata (The Cat), Fernández began his professional career with River Plate. After a stint with Racing and another season back with River, in 2006 he was loaned to Monterrey. When the contract was finished, Monterrey declined to pay the nearly two million dollars to permanently buy Gastón, thus prompting him to return to River Plate in December 2006.

However, Daniel Passarella, then River's head coach, believed that the team had enough strikers. Fernández was therefore sold to San Lorenzo de Almagro. In San Lorenzo La Gata revindictated his career. He was the leading scorer of the team that won the 2007 Clausura championship. He then spent one year in Mexico with Tigres de la UANL.

In 2008, Fernández returned to Argentina to play for Estudiantes de La Plata, where he finished as runner up with the team in the 2008 Copa Sudamericana. He was then a first team regular in the team that won the 2009 Copa Libertadores, where he scored the equalising goal in the second leg of the final against Cruzeiro. Subsequently, he went back to Tigres, where he helped win the 2009 SuperLiga title against Chicago Fire. In January 2010, Tigres released the Argentine winger upon his request, and Fernández returned to Estudiantes. Upon his return, Fernández helped lead Estudiantes to the 2010 Apertura tournament title.

On January 15, 2014, Fernández signed with Major League Soccer club Portland Timbers. On March 8, 2014, La Gata scored an equalizer goal in the 93' of his MLS debut to extend the Timbers' home unbeaten streak to sixteen. He added a second goal the following game on March 16, 2014, against the Chicago Fire to force another draw.

On August 3, 2015, MLS announced that Fernández and the Timbers had mutually agreed to part ways.

== International career ==
Gastón Fernández has played for several of Argentina's youth teams.

== Honours ==
River Plate

- Argentine Primera División: 2003 Clausura

San Lorenzo

- Argentine Primera División: 2007 Clausura

Tigres

- North American SuperLiga: 2009

Estudiantes

- Copa Libertadores: 2009
- Argentine Primera División: 2010 Apertura

Grêmio

- Copa Libertadores: 2017

Portland Timbers

- MLS Cup: 2015
