= 2016 Portland Timbers 2 season =

Portland Timbers 2
2016 season
- President: Merritt Paulson
- Head coach: Andrew Gregor
- Stadium: Merlo Field; Portland, Oregon (Capacity: 4,892)
- United Soccer League: 9th
- USL Playoffs: DNQ
- Top goalscorer: Neco Brett(7)
- Highest home attendance: 2,231 (May 21 vs Vancouver Whitecaps FC 2)
- Lowest home attendance: 1,528 (Apr. 8 vs Rio Grande Valley)
- Average home league attendance: 1,739.75
Primary colors	Secondary colors

The 2016 Portland Timbers 2 season was the second season for the Portland Timbers 2 in the United Soccer League (USL), the third-division professional soccer league in the United States and Canada. Portland Timbers 2 are the reserve team of MLS side, Portland Timbers.

== Competitions ==
=== United Soccer League ===
Competition	Started round	Final position	First match	Last match	Qualification
2016 USL Regular Season (Western Conference)	USL 1	9th	March 26, 2016	September 24, 2016	2016 USL Playoffs
2016 USL Playoffs	DNQ	-	-	-	

==== Preseason ====
Win Draw Loss Upcoming fixture

March 18, 2016 Pre 1	Portland Pilots	1–2	Portland Timbers 2	Portland, Oregon, U.S.
19:00 (PST)	Sanchez 52'	T2 Report; UP report	41' (o.g.); Bijev 58'	Stadium: Merlo Field

==== USL regular season ====
Win Draw Loss Upcoming fixture

March 26, 2016 USL 1	Swope Park Rangers	2–1	Portland Timbers 2	Kansas City, Kansas, U.S.
17:30 (PST)	Oliveira 48' (pen.), (yellow card) 54'; Sallói 90'	Report	Bijev (yellow card) 39'; Besler 90'	Stadium: Children's Mercy Park; Attendance: 6,812; Referee: Jon Freeman

April 2, 2016 USL 2	Portland Timbers 2	1–3	Vancouver Whitecaps FC 2	Portland, Oregon, U.S.
19:00 (PST)	Damraoui 79', (red card) 84'	Report	Greig 60' (pen.), (yellow card) 90'; Haber 67', 76' de Wit (yellow card) 73'	Stadium: Merlo Field; Attendance: 1,625; Referee: Ekaterina Koroleva

April 8, 2016 USL 3	Portland Timbers 2	0–2	Rio Grande Valley FC Toros	Portland, Oregon, U.S.
19:00 (PST)	Belmar (yellow card) 90'	Report	Bourgeois 18'; Catic 31' (pen.); James (yellow card) 53'	Stadium: Merlo Field; Attendance: 1,528; Referee: Chipalo Street

April 17, 2016 USL 4	Portland Timbers 2	1–0	Sacramento Republic FC	Portland, Oregon, U.S.
14:00 (PST)	Belmar 56'; Brett (yellow card) 90'	Report	Christian (yellow card) 12'; Jahn (red card) 76'	Stadium: Merlo Field; Attendance: 1,649; Referee: Ramy Touchan

April 20, 2016 USL 5	Orange County Blues FC	1–0	Portland Timbers 2	Irvine, California, U.S.
19:00 (PST)	Caesar (yellow card) (goal) 39'	Report	Arboleda (yellow card); Duarte (yellow card); Lowe (yellow card)	Stadium: Anteater Stadium; Referee: Osvaldo Delgado-Landeros

April 23, 2016 USL 6	Tulsa Roughnecks FC	0–2	Portland Timbers 2	Tulsa, Oklahoma, U.S.
17:00 (PST)	Davoren (yellow card) 46'; Kaleem (yellow card) 54'; Morgan (yellow card) 65'; Ballew (yellow card) 91'	Report	McIntosh (yellow card) 19'; Brett (yellow card) 19'; Belmar 22'; Lewis 26'	Stadium: ONEOK Field; Attendance: 4,087; Referee: Jon Freemon

April 30, 2016 USL 7	Arizona United SC	1–1	Portland Timbers 2	Peoria, Arizona, U.S.
19:30 (PST)	Garza 80' (Timm); Costa (yellow card) 81'	Report	Arboleda 1'; Gallagher (yellow card) 62'	Stadium: Peoria Sports Complex; Attendance: 3,374; Referee: Michael Lavergne

May 7, 2016 USL 8	Portland Timbers 2	3–1	Real Monarchs	Portland, Oregon, U.S.
14:00 (PST)	Polk 17'; Peay (yellow card) 48'; Bijev (yellow card) 67'; Brett 80', 90'	Report	Lennon (yellow card) 68'; Brody 86'	Stadium: Providence Park; Attendance: 2,157; Referee: Victor Rivas

May 13, 2016 USL 9	Colorado Springs Switchbacks FC	1–0	Portland Timbers 2	Colorado Springs, Colorado, U.S.
18:00 (PST)	Burt (yellow card) 44'; Seth 52'	Report	Thoma (yellow card) 86'	Stadium: Switchbacks Stadium; Attendance: 4,012; Referee: Malik Badawi

May 20, 2016 USL 10	Portland Timbers 2	1–3	Vancouver Whitecaps FC 2	Portland, Oregon, U.S.
19:30 (PST)	Brett 27'	Report	Greig 1'; Safiu 19'; Greig (yellow card) 67'; Haynes 74'	Stadium: Providence Park; Attendance: 2,231; Referee: Ian Miller

May 26, 2016 USL 11	Portland Timbers 2	1–0	Seattle Sounders FC 2	Portland, Oregon, U.S.
19:00 (PST)	Bijev 25'	Report		Stadium: Providence Park; Attendance: 3,627; Referee: Alex Chilowicz

June 4, 2016 USL 12	Portland Timbers 2	2–1	Swope Park Rangers	Meridian, Idaho, U.S.
18:00 (PST)	Brett 27'; Gallagher (yellow card) 55'; Arboleda 70'	Report	Gonzalez 80'	Stadium: Rocky Mountain High School; Attendance: 4,352; Referee: Tyler Ploeger

June 11, 2016 USL 13	Portland Timbers 2	1–1	San Antonio	Portland, Oregon, U.S.
19:00 (PST)	Gallagher (yellow card) 13'; 16' (o.g.); Casiple (yellow card) 32'; Belmar (red card) 82'; Morley (yellow card) 90'	Report	Thurière (yellow card) 38'; Palacios 87'; Araujo (yellow card) 90'	Stadium: Merlo Field; Attendance: 1,784; Referee: Daniel Radford

June 14, 2016 USL 14	Portland Timbers 2	1–2	Seattle Sounders FC 2	Portland, Oregon
19:00 (PST)	Bodily 67'	Report	Samuel 35'; Magnus 43'; Delem (yellow card) 54'; Kapawa (yellow card) 88'; Mansaray (yellow card) 90'	Stadium: Providence Park; Attendance: 2,536; Referee: Ekaterina Koroleva

June 19, 2016 USL 15	Vancouver Whitecaps FC 2	1–0	Portland Timbers 2	Vancouver, BC, Canada
14:00 (PST)	Haber 87'	Report	Brett (yellow card) 35'; Klute (yellow card) 84'; Powell (yellow card) 91'	Stadium: Thunderbird Stadium; Attendance: 1,541; Referee: Michelle Pye

June 25, 2016 USL 16	Saint Louis FC	1–0	Portland Timbers 2	Fenton, Missouri, U.S.
17:30 (PST)	Musa (yellow card) 32'; Herrera 57' (pen.)	Report	Clarke (yellow card) 54'; Casiple (yellow card) 83'	Stadium: World Wide Technology Soccer Park; Attendance: 5,513; Referee: Edvin Jurisevic

July 7, 2016 USL 17	Portland Timbers 2	1–1	Colorado Springs Switchbacks FC	Portland, Oregon, U.S.
19:00 (PST)	Vercollone 16'	Report	Farfan (yellow card) 19'; Gallagher (yellow card) 81'; Belmar 87'	Stadium: Merlo Field; Attendance: 1,630; Referee: Victor Rivas

July 16, 2016 USL 18	Portland Timbers 2	1–4	LA Galaxy II	Portland, Oregon, U.S.
14:00 (PST)	Lewis (yellow card) 9'; Belmar (yellow card) 21'; Clarke (yellow card) 24' (yellow-red card) 54', (goal) 35'; Arboleda (yellow card) 55'	Report	Nishanian 6'; Rebellón 18'; Mendiola 39'; Amaya (yellow card) 41'; Smith (yellow card) 45'; Arellano (yellow card) 70'; McBean 75'; Jamieson (yellow card) 77'	Stadium: Merlo Field; Attendance: 2,152; Referee: Chipalo Street

July 24, 2016 USL 19	Seattle Sounders FC 2	1–0	Portland Timbers 2	Tukwila, Washington
17:00 (PST)	Mathers (yellow card) 74'; O'Ojong 89'	Report	Damraoui (yellow card) 62'	Stadium: Starfire Sports Complex; Attendance: 1,618; Referee: Alejandro Mariscal

August 3, 2016 USL 20	Portland Timbers 2	1–1	Colorado Springs Switchbacks FC	Portland, Oregon, U.S.
19:30 (PST)	González 73'	Report	Clarke 76'; Thoma (yellow card) 90'	Stadium: Merlo Field; Attendance: 1,775; Referee: Ramy Touchan

August 6, 2016 USL 21	LA Galaxy II	3–4	Portland Timbers 2	Carson, California, U.S.
19:30 (PST)	Taylor 9' (o.g.); Lassiter 15', 45'; Sorto (yellow card) 16'; Covarrubias (yellow card) 53'; Amaya (red card) 59'; Arellano (yellow card) 79'; Payeras (yellow card) 79'	Report	Bodily 62'; Thoma (yellow card) 65'; Bijev 67', 87'; Brett 90'	Stadium: StubHub Center; Attendance: 2,019; Referee: Daniel Radford

August 14, 2016 USL 22	Portland Timbers 2	2–1	Orange County Blues FC	Portland, Oregon, U.S.
14:00 (PST)	Bodily (yellow card) 22'; Taylor 27', (yellow card) 85'; Arboleda 29'; Williams (yellow card) 45'	Report	Meeus (yellow card) 31'; Chaplow (yellow card) 38'; Griffiths (yellow card) 85'; Rauhofer 90' (pen.)	Stadium: Merlo Field; Attendance: 2,469; Referee: Farhad Dadkho

August 17, 2016 USL 23	Real Monarchs	2–1	Portland Timbers 2	Sandy, Utah, U.S.
18:00 (PST)	Orellana 13'; Orozco (yellow card) 47'; Velazco (yellow card) 79'; Bijev 86' (o.g.)	Report	Bodily 70'	Stadium: Rio Tinto Stadium; Attendance: 2,016; Referee: Brad Jensen

August 20, 2016 USL 24	Sacramento Republic FC	4–0	Portland Timbers 2	Sacramento, California, U.S.
20:00 (PST)	da Fonte 4'; LaGrassa (yellow card) 22'; Iwasa 45'; Thompson 48', (yellow card) 67'; Kneeshaw 82'	Report	Farfan (yellow card) 25'; Besler (yellow card) 37'	Stadium: Bonney Field; Attendance: 11,569; Referee: Michael Zapata

August 29, 2016 USL 25	Seattle Sounders FC 2	0–1	Portland Timbers 2	Tukwila, Washington, U.S.
19:30 (PST)		Report	Bijev 25'	Stadium: Starfire Sports Complex; Attendance: 3,627; Referee: Alex Chilowicz

September 4, 2016 USL 26	Portland Timbers 2	4–0	Oklahoma City Energy FC	Portland, Oregon, U.S.
14:00 (PST)	Lewis (yellow card) 28'; Bijev 35' (pen.), 46'; Bodily 70'; Williams 73' (pen.)	Report		Stadium: Merlo Field; Attendance: 2,016; Referee: Baboucarr Jallow

September 10, 2016 USL 27	Rio Grande Valley FC Toros	0–1	Portland Timbers 2	Edinburg, Texas, U.S.
17:30 (PST)		Report	Damraoui (yellow card) 45'; Richards 60'	Stadium: RGV FC Stadium; Attendance: 2,087; Referee: Tyler Mitcham

September 13, 2016 USL 28	Arizona United SC	1–2	Portland Timbers 2	Peoria, Arizona, U.S.
19:30 (PST)	Cascio 23'; Granger (yellow card) 29'; Gavin (yellow card) 59'; Rooney (yellow card) 67'	Report	Williams 59'; Lewis (yellow card) 61'; Brett 90'; McIntosh (yellow card) 90'	Stadium: Peoria Sports Complex; Attendance: 964; Referee: Robi Hullner

September 18, 2016 USL 29	Vancouver Whitecaps FC 2	0–2	Portland Timbers 2	Vancouver, BC, Canada
14:00 (PST)	McKendry (yellow card) 8'	Report	Thoma (yellow card) 10'; Brett 13'; Bijev (yellow card) 34', (goal) 43'	Stadium: Thunderbird Stadium; Attendance: 1,794; Referee: Alain Ruch

September 24, 2016 USL 30	Portland Timbers 2	3–2	Arizona United SC	Portland, Oregon, U.S.
19:00 (PST)	Clarke (yellow card) 19'; Williams 27'; Bijev 35', 45'	Report	Rooney 19', (yellow card) 66'; Cortez 72'; Poltronieri (yellow card) 78'	Stadium: Merlo Field; Attendance: 3,602; Referee: Chipalo Street

===== Results by round =====
Round	1	2	3	4	5	6	7	8	9	10	11	12	13	14	15	16	17	18	19	20	21	22	23	24	25	26	27	28	29	30
Stadium	A	H	H	H	A	A	A	H	A	H	H	H	H	H	A	A	H	H	A	H	A	H	A	A	A	H	A	A	A	H
Result	L	L	L	W	L	W	D	W	L	L	W	W	D	L	L	L	D	L	L	D	W	W	L	L	W	W	W	W	W	W

Updated to match(es) played on September 17, 2016. Source: Schedule
A = Away; H = Home; W = Win; D = Draw; L = Loss

===== Results by location =====
Overall								Home						Away					
Pld	W	D	L	GF	GA	GD	Pts	W	D	L	GF	GA	GD	W	D	L	GF	GA	GD
30	13	4	13	38	40	−2	43	7	3	5	23	22	+1	6	1	8	15	18	−3

Last updated: September 27, 2016.
Source: Match reports

==== USL Playoffs ====
Win Draw Loss Upcoming fixture

==== Western Conference standings ====
Pos	Team	Pld	W	D	L	GF	GA	GD	Pts	Qualification
7	Oklahoma City Energy	30	10	13	7	32	30	+2	43	Conference Playoffs
8	Orange County Blues	30	12	4	14	39	41	−2	40	Conference Playoffs
9	Portland Timbers 2	30	12	4	14	38	42	−4	40	
10	San Antonio FC	30	10	8	12	36	36	0	38	
11	Real Monarchs	30	10	6	14	31	41	−10	36	

Source: 2016 USL Standings
Rules for classification: 1) total wins; 2) total goal differential; 3) total goals scored; 4) points earned against top four Conference finishers; 5) disciplinary points; 6) coin toss or drawing of lots

=== U.S. Open Cup ===
Beginning 2016 and forward, Portland Timbers 2 will not be eligible to enter the U.S. Open Cup per the USSF rule stating that any USL club that is owned by an MLS club is unable to enter the tournament.

=== Friendlies ===
There were no friendlies for the 2016 season.

== Club ==
=== Executive staff ===
Position	Staff
Majority Owner & President	Merritt Paulson
Chief Operating Officer	Mike Golub
General Manager / Technical Director	Gavin Wilkinson

Last updated: January 12, 2016
Source: Portland Timbers

=== Coaching staff ===
Position	Staff
Head Coach	Andrew Gregor
Assistant Coach	Steve Reese
Assistant Coach	Shannon Murray
Strength & Conditioning Coach	Charles Burdick
T2 Athletic Trainer	Taichi Kitagawa

Last updated: January 6, 2016
Source: Portland Timbers

=== Stadiums ===
Ground (capacity and dimensions)	Merlo Field (21,144 / 120x75 yards)
Ground (capacity and dimensions)	Providence Park (Alternative) (20,438 / 110x75 yards)
Training Ground	Adidas Training Facility

Source: Merlo Field

== Kits ==
=== Primary kits ===
Portland Timbers 2 will be using the same first kit as first Portland Timbers but instead will have USL patches instead of MLS patches on it. It features a large chevron on the chest with its primary colors being dark green, light green, and white. It features the Portland Timber's community program "Stand Together" on the front.

Primary	Primary Alt.

Type	Shirt	Shorts	Socks
Primary	Green / White	White	Green
Primary Alt.	Green / White	Green	Green

=== Secondary kits ===
Type	Shirt	Shorts	Socks
Secondary	Red / Black	Red	Red

== First team ==
=== Roster ===
All players contracted to the club during the season included. Players added from parent club Portland Timbers when added to USL roster
Last updated: June 13, 2016

No.	Name	Nationality	Positions	Date of birth (age)	Year with Club (Year Signed)
Goalkeepers
29	Justin Luthy (U23)	(United States)	GK	April 17, 1991 (age 34)	2 (2015)
33	Wade Hamilton (T) (SD)	(United States)	GK	September 15, 1994 (age 31)	1 (2016)
43	Kendall McIntosh	(United States)	GK	January 24, 1994 (age 32)	1 (2016)
Defenders
2	Alvas Powell (T)	(Jamaica)	DF	July 18, 1994 (age 31)	1 (2016)
15	Chris Klute (T)	(United States)	DF	March 5, 1990 (age 36)	1 (2016)
20	Taylor Peay (T)	(United States)	DF	September 5, 1991 (age 34)	2 (2015)
28	Andy Thoma (T)	(United States)	DF	April 29, 1993 (age 32)	2 (2015)
32	Trevor Morley (SD)	(United States)	DF	December 7, 1992 (age 33)	1 (2016)
44	Akinjide Idowu	(Nigeria)	DF	September 9, 1996 (age 29)	1 (2016)
47	Rennico Clarke	(Jamaica)	DF	August 27, 1995 (age 30)	2 (2015)
50	Michael Gallagher	(United States)	DF / MF	August 7, 1994 (age 31)	1 (2016)
72	Steven Taylor (T)	(England)	DF	January 23, 1986 (age 40)	1 (2016)
95	Marco Farfan (U18)	(United States)	DF	November 12, 1998 (age 27)	1 (2016)
Midfielders
18	Amobi Okugo (T)	(United States)	MF / DF	March 13, 1991 (age 34)	1 (2016)
23	Jack Barmby (T)	(England)	MF / DF / FW	November 14, 1994 (age 31)	1 (2016)
25	Neco Brett (T) (SD)	(United States)	MF	March 22, 1992 (age 33)	1 (2016)
27	Nick Besler (T)	(United States)	MF	April 22, 1987 (age 38)	2 (2015)
45	Christian Duarte	(United States)	MF	February 22, 1994 (age 32)	1 (2016)
46	Villyan Bijev	(Bulgaria)	MF / FW	January 3, 1993 (age 33)	1 (2016)
49	Irving Garcia	(United States)	MF	February 4, 1988 (age 38)	1 (2016)
51	Steve Palacios	(United States)	MF	May 20, 1993 (age 32)	1 (2016)
70	Dylan Damraoui	(Belgium)	MF	May 4, 1997 (age 28)	1 (2016)
77	Andre Lewis	(Jamaica)	MF	August 12, 1994 (age 31)	1 (2016)
84	Seth Casiple	(United States)	MF	August 23, 1993 (age 32)	2 (2015)
92	Terrell Lowe (U18)	(United States)	MF	May 12, 1998 (age 27)	1 (2016)
96	Blake Bodily (U18)	(United States)	MF	January 13, 1998 (age 28)	2 (2015)
Forwards
19	Ben Polk (T) (SD)	(England)	FW	September 19, 1992 (age 33)	1 (2016)
30	Kharlton Belmar (U23)	(United States)	FW	December 1, 1992 (age 33)	2 (2015)
55	Brent Richards (U23)	(United States)	FW	May 21, 1990 (age 35)	2 (2015)
73	Victor Arboleda	(Colombia)	FW / MF	January 1, 1997 (age 29)	1 (2016)
80	Augustine Williams	(Sierra Leone)	FW	August 3, 1997 (age 28)	1 (2016)
97	Alexis Meva	(Cameroon)	FW	September 9, 1997 (age 28)	1 (2016)

- (Loan) = On Loan
- (T) = Loaned in from Portland Timbers (parent club)
- (U18) = Former Portland Timbers U-18 player
- (U23) = Former Portland Timbers U-23 player
- (SD) = 2016 MLS Superdraft Pick

== Transfers ==
=== Transfers in ===
Date	Player	Positions	Previous club	Fee/notes	Ref
January 26, 2016	(Nigeria) Akinjide Idowu	MF	Nigeria Youth Soccer Academy		
January 26, 2016	(Belgium) Dylan Damraoui	MF	(Belgium) Club Brugge KV		
January 26, 2016	(Cameroon) Alexis Meva	FW	(Spain) FC Barcelona Juvenil A		
March 1, 2016	(United States) Trevor Morley	DF	(United States) Cal State Northridge Matadors	Signed from 2016 MLS SuperDraft	
March 18, 2016	(Bulgaria) Villyan Bijev	FW	(Bulgaria) PFC Cherno More Varna		
March 18, 2016	(United States) Michael Gallagher	DF / MF	(United States) University of Washington		
March 18, 2016	(Jamaica) Andre Lewis	MF	(Canada) Vancouver Whitecaps FC 2		
March 18, 2016	(United States) Kendall McIntosh	GK	(United States) Santa Clara University		
March 23, 2016	(Colombia) Victor Arboleda	FW / MF	(Colombia) Deportivo Cali		
March 23, 2016	(United States) Christian Duarte	MF	(United States) California State University-Bakersfield		
March 23, 2016	(United States) Irving Garcia	MF	(Guatemala) FC Rosario		
March 23, 2016	(United States) Steve Palacios	DF / MF	(United States) LA Galaxy II		
August 3, 2016	(Sierra Leone) Augustine Williams	FW	(United States) Nomads SC		

=== Loans in ===
Date	Player	Positions	Previous club	Fee/notes	Ref
March 26, 2016	(United States) Wade Hamilton	GK	(United States) Portland Timbers	Loaned in from parent club.	
March 26, 2016	(United States) Chris Klute	DF	(United States) Portland Timbers	Loaned in from parent club.	
March 26, 2016	(United States) Taylor Peay	DF	(United States) Portland Timbers	Loaned in from parent club.	
March 26, 2016	(United States) Andy Thoma	DF	(United States) Portland Timbers	Loaned in from parent club.	
March 26, 2016	(United States) Anthony Manning	DF	(United States) Portland Timbers	Loaned in from parent club.	
March 26, 2016	(United States) Neco Brett	MF	(United States) Portland Timbers	Loaned in from parent club.	
March 26, 2016	(United States) Nick Besler	MF	(United States) Portland Timbers	Loaned in from parent club.	
March 26, 2016	(England) Ben Polk	FW	(United States) Portland Timbers	Loaned in from parent club.	
March 26, 2016	(Jamaica) Michael Seaton	FW	(United States) Portland Timbers	Loaned in from parent club. Waived from Portland Timbers on May 13, 2016.	
May 16, 2016	(United States) Amobi Okugo	MF	(United States) Portland Timbers	Loaned in from parent club.	
June 11, 2016	(Jamaica) Alvas Powell	DF	(United States) Portland Timbers	Loaned in from parent club.	
June 11, 2016	(England) Jack Barmby	MF / DF / FW	(United States) Portland Timbers	Loaned in from parent club.	

=== Loans out ===
Date	Player	Positions	Destination club	Fee/notes	Ref

=== Transfers out ===
Date	Player	Positions	Destination club	Fee/notes	Ref
January 21, 2016	(Australia) Harrison Delbridge	DF	(United States) FC Cincinnati	End of Contract. Signed by FC Cincinnati.	
February 3, 2016	(United States) Blair Gavin	MF	(United States) Arizona United SC	End of Contract. Signed by Arizona United SC.	
March 22, 2016	(United States) Danny O'Rourke	DF		No longer on roster.	
March 22, 2016	(United States) Matt Rose	DF	(United States) Tampa Bay Rowdies 2	No longer on roster.	
March 22, 2016	(New Zealand) Tim Payne	MF	(New Zealand) Eastern Suburbs	No longer on roster.	
March 22, 2016	(Argentina) Santiago Biglieri	FW	(Argentina) CA Colón	No longer on roster.	
March 22, 2016	(United States) Daniel Withrow	GK		No longer on roster.	
March 22, 2016	(United States) Steve Evans	GK		No longer on roster.	

=== Contract Extensions ===
Date	Player	Positions	Year with Club (Year Signed)	Notes	Ref

=== Staff in ===
Date	Name	Position	Previous club	Notes	Ref
January 26, 2016	(United States) Shannon Murray	Asst. Coach	(United States) Washington Youth Soccer		

=== Staff out ===
Date	Name	Position	Destination club	Notes	Ref

=== National Team Participation ===
Player	Nation	# of Call ups	Ref

== Statistics ==
=== Appearances ===
No.	Pos.	Name	USL				USL Playoffs				Total			
No.	Pos.	Name	Apps	Goals	Yellow card	Red card	Apps	Goals	Yellow card	Red card	Apps	Goals	Yellow card	Red card
2	DF	(Jamaica) Alvas Powell	2	0	1	0	0	0	0	0	2	0	1	0
12	DF	(Nigeria) Gbenga Arokoyo	1	0	0	0	0	0	0	0	1	0	0	0
15	DF	(United States) Chris Klute	5	0	1	0	0	0	0	0	5	0	1	0
18	MF	(United States) Amobi Okugo	3	0	0	0	0	0	0	0	3	0	0	0
19	FW	(England) Ben Polk	25	1	0	0	0	0	0	0	25	1	0	0
20	DF	(United States) Taylor Peay	9	0	1	0	0	0	0	0	9	0	1	0
23	MF	(England) Jack Barmby	1	0	0	0	0	0	0	0	1	0	0	0
25	MF	(United States) Neco Brett	28	7	3	0	0	0	0	0	28	7	3	0
27	MF	(United States) Nick Besler	24	1	1	0	0	0	0	0	24	1	1	0
28	MF	(United States) Andy Thoma	16	0	4	0	0	0	0	0	16	0	4	0
29	GK	(United States) Justin Luthy	1	0	0	0	0	0	0	0	1	0	0	0
30	FW	(United States) Kharlton Belmar	25	3	3	1	0	0	0	0	25	3	3	1
32	DF	(United States) Trevor Morley	17	0	1	0	0	0	0	0	17	0	1	0
33	GK	(United States) Wade Hamilton	11	0	0	0	0	0	0	0	11	0	0	0
43	GK	(United States) Kendall McIntosh	18	0	1	0	0	0	0	0	18	0	1	0
44	DF	(Nigeria) Akinjide Idowu	1	0	0	0	0	0	0	0	1	0	0	0
45	MF	(United States) Christian Duarte	4	0	1	0	0	0	0	0	4	0	1	0
46	MF	(Bulgaria) Villyan Bijev	29	8	4	0	0	0	0	0	29	8	4	0
47	DF	(Jamaica) Rennico Clarke	14	2	2	1	0	0	0	0	14	2	2	1
49	MF	(United States) Irving Garcia	0	0	0	0	0	0	0	0	0	0	0	0
50	DF	(United States) Michael Gallagher	24	0	6	0	0	0	0	0	24	0	6	0
51	MF	(United States) Steve Palacios	3	0	0	0	0	0	0	0	3	0	0	0
55	FW	(United States) Brent Richards	21	1	0	0	0	0	0	0	21	1	0	0
70	MF	(Belgium) Dylan Damraoui	16	1	2	1	0	0	0	0	16	1	2	1
72	DF	(England) Steven Taylor	2	1	1	0	0	0	0	0	2	1	1	0
73	FW	(Colombia) Victor Arboleda	25	4	2	0	0	0	0	0	25	4	2	0
77	MF	(Jamaica) Andrew Lewis	24	1	3	0	0	0	0	0	13	1	3	0
80	FW	(Sierra Leone) Augustine Williams	11	3	1	0	0	0	0	0	13	3	1	0
84	MF	(United States) Seth Casiple	21	0	2	0	0	0	0	0	21	0	2	0
92	MF	(United States) Terrell Lowe	10	0	1	0	0	0	0	0	10	0	1	0
95	DF	(United States) Marco Farfan	18	0	2	0	0	0	0	0	18	0	2	0
96	MF	(United States) Blake Bodily	16	4	1	0	0	0	0	0	16	4	1	0
97	FW	(Cameroon) Alexis Meva	3	0	0	0	0	0	0	0	3	0	0	0
Players who were transferred/waived from the club during active season or on loan
31	FW	(Jamaica) Michael Seaton	0	0	0	0	0	0	0	0	0	0	0	0
35	DF	(United States) Anthony Manning	2	0	0	0	0	0	0	0	2	0	0	0

Last updated: September 24, 2016.
Source: USL Team Stats

=== Goalkeeper stats ===
No.	Player	USL				USL Playoffs				Total			
No.	Player	MIN	GA	GAA	SV	MIN	GA	GAA	SV	MIN	GA	GAA	SV
29	(United States) Justin Luthy	90	1	1.00	4	0	0	0.00	0	90	1	1.00	4
33	(United States) Wade Hamilton	990	20	1.82	41	0	0	0.00	0	990	20	1.82	41
43	(United States) Kendall McIntosh	1620	21	1.17	65	0	0	0.00	0	1620	21	1.17	65
	TOTALS	2700	42	1.40	110	0	0	0.00	0	2700	42	1.40	110

Last updated: September 27, 2016.
Source: USL Team Stats

=== Top scorers ===
The list is sorted by shirt number when total goals are equal.

Rnk	Pos	No.	Player	USL	USL Playoffs	Total
1	MF	25	(United States) Neco Brett	7	0	7
2	FW	46	(Bulgaria) Villyan Bijev	6	0	6
3	MF	96	(United States) Blake Bodily	4	0	4
3	FW	73	(Colombia) Victor Arboleda	4	0	4
5	FW	30	(United States) Kharlton Belmar	3	0	3
6	DF	47	(England) Rennico Clarke	2	0	2
6	FW	80	(Sierra Leone) Augustine Williams	2	0	2
8	FW	19	(England) Ben Polk	1	0	1
8	MF	27	(United States) Nick Besler	1	0	1
8	FW	55	(United States) Brent Richards	1	0	1
8	MF	70	(Belgium) Dylan Damraoui	1	0	1
8	DF	72	(England) Steven Taylor	1	0	1
8	MF	77	(Jamaica) Andrew Lewis	1	0	1
Own goals				1	0	1
TOTALS				35	0	35

Last updated: September 22, 2016.
Source: USL Team Stats

=== Top assists ===
The list is sorted by shirt number when total assists are equal.

Rnk	Pos	No.	Player	USL	USL Playoffs	Total
1	FW	46	(Bulgaria) Villyan Bijev	9	0	9
2	FW	25	(United States) Neco Brett	3	0	3
2	FW	30	(United States) Kharlton Belmar	3	0	3
4	DF	50	(United States) Michael Gallagher	1	0	1
4	MF	70	(Belgium) Dylan Damraoui	1	0	1
4	MF	77	(Jamaica) Andre Lewis	1	0	1
4	MF	84	(United States) Seth Casiple	1	0	1
TOTALS				19	0	19

Last updated: September 22, 2016.
Source: USL Team Stats

=== Clean sheets ===
The list is sorted by shirt number when total appearances are equal.

Rnk	No.	Player	USL	USL Playoffs	Total
1	43	(United States) Kendall McIntosh	5	0	5
2	33	(United States) Wade Hamilton	2	0	2
3	29	(United States) Justin Luthy	0	0	0
TOTALS			7	0	7

Last updated: September 22, 2016.
Source: USL Stats

=== Summary ===
Games played	29 (17 USL)
Games won	11 (5 USL)
Games drawn	4 (3 USL)
Games lost	14 (9 USL)
Goals scored	35 (35 USL)
Goals conceded	40 (40 USL)
Goal difference	-5 (-5 USL)
Clean sheets	2 (2 USL)
Yellow cards	43 (43 USL)
Red cards	3 (3 USL)
Most appearances	28 Appearances (Villyan Bijev)
Top scorer	7 (Neco Brett)
Top assists	3 (Villyan Bijev)
Top clean sheets	5 (Kendall McIntosh)
Winning Percentage	Overall: 11/29 (37.9%)

Last updated: September 22, 2016.
Source: USL Team Stats

== See also ==
- 2016 Portland Timbers season
- 2016 USL season
