= 2015 Portland Timbers 2 season =

Portland Timbers 2
2015 season
- President: Merritt Paulson
- Head coach: Jay Vidovich
- Stadium: Merlo Field; Portland, Oregon (Capacity: 4,892)
- United Soccer League: Conference: 8th Overall: 13th
- USL Playoffs: DNQ
- U.S. Open Cup: 3rd Round
- Top goalscorer: League: Kharlton Belmar (9); All: Kharlton Belmar (11)
- Highest home attendance: League: 4,944 (May 3 vs. Orange County, at Providence Park); All: 15,069 (July 21 vs. Newcastle United, at Providence Park)
- Lowest home attendance: League: 2,278 (July 19 vs. Whitecaps 2, at Merlo Field); All: 333 (Mar. 22 vs. U. of Portland, at Merlo Field)
- Average home league attendance: League: 3,054; All: 3,983
Home colors	Secondary colors

The 2015 Portland Timbers 2 season was the inaugural season for the Portland Timbers 2 in the United Soccer League (USL), the third-division professional soccer league in the United States and Canada. Timbers 2 is the reserve team of the MLS side, Portland Timbers.

== Competitions ==
=== United Soccer League ===
==== Preseason ====
March 1 Scrimmage	Portland Timbers 2	2–0	Gonzaga Bulldogs	Portland, Oregon
	Manning; Safiu (pen.)	Report		Stadium: Providence Park; Attendance: Closed-door

March 8 Scrimmage	Portland Timbers 2	3–0	Oregon State Beavers	Beaverton, Oregon
	Safiu 19'; Manning 68'; Winchester 84'	Report		Stadium: adidas Timbers Training Center; Attendance: Closed-door

March 13 Scrimmage	Portland Timbers 2	1–0	Washington Huskies	Portland, Oregon
	Evans 78'	Report		Stadium: Providence Park; Attendance: Closed-door

March 21 Scrimmage	Portland Timbers 2	2–1	Vancouver Whitecaps FC	Portland, Oregon
	Safiu 6'; Eueller Rodriguez 66'; Trialist (yellow card) 67'	Report	Bustos 53'	Stadium: Providence Park; Attendance: Closed-door

March 22 Scrimmage	Portland Timbers 2	4–1	Portland Pilots	Portland, Oregon
	Belmar 17'; Safiu 34'; Evans 39'; Winchester 73'; Payne (yellow card) 89'	Report	Sanchez (yellow card) 42'; Coffey (yellow card) 57'; Edwardson 60'	Stadium: Merlo Field; Attendance: 333; Referee: Chipalo Street

==== USL regular season ====
March 29 1	Portland Timbers 2	3–1	Real Monarchs SLC	Portland, Oregon
	Belmar 31', 54'; Tshuma (yellow card) 52'; Winchester 58'	Report	Losee (yellow card) 43' (yellow-red card) 86'; Navarro 59'; Baldin (yellow card) 76'	Stadium: Merlo Field; Attendance: 3,667; Referee: Ekaterina Koroleva

April 2 2	Portland Timbers 2	2–1	Sacramento Republic FC	Portland, Oregon
	Belmar 62'; Peay (yellow card) 69'; Evans 87'	Report	Foran (yellow card) 35'; Daly (yellow card) 59'; Iwasa 61'	Stadium: Merlo Field; Attendance: 2,501; Referee: Josh Wilkens

April 8 3	Real Monarchs SLC	1–1	Portland Timbers 2	Sandy, Utah
	Saucedo (yellow card) 26'; Glad 27'	Report	Safiu 7', (yellow card) 47'; Winchester (yellow card) 32'; Clarke (yellow card) 68' (yellow-red card) 69'	Stadium: Rio Tinto Stadium; Attendance: 4,279; Referee: Tyler Ploeger

April 11 4	Seattle Sounders FC 2	2–1	Portland Timbers 2	Tukwila, Washington
	Rossi 47'; Frano (yellow card) 74', (goal) 88'	Report	Delbridge 30'; Payne (yellow card) 51'; Winchester (yellow card) 90+'	Stadium: Starfire Sports Complex; Attendance: 2,304; Referee: Chipalo Street

April 18 5	Sacramento Republic FC	3–0	Portland Timbers 2	Sacramento, California
	López 13'; Daly 37'; Mirković (yellow card) 44'; Braun (yellow card) 56'; Alvarez (yellow card) 66'; Taublieb 82'	Report		Stadium: Bonney Field; Attendance: 11,242; Referee: Vincent Apple-Chaire

April 25 6	Arizona United SC	0–2	Portland Timbers 2	Scottsdale, Arizona
	Top (yellow card) 25'	Report	Clarke (yellow card) 14'; Belmar 20', 44'; Besler (yellow card) 71'	Stadium: Scottsdale Stadium; Attendance: 6,108; Referee: Ramy Touchan

May 3 7	Portland Timbers 2	0–2	Orange County Blues FC	Portland, Oregon
	Fochive (yellow card) 53'	Report	Crettenand 27'; Slager 34'; Cortez (yellow card) 82'; Miranda (yellow card) 87'	Stadium: Providence Park; Attendance: 4,944; Referee: Levi Rippy

May 9 8	Colorado Springs Switchbacks FC	postponed	Portland Timbers 2	Colorado Springs, Colorado
		Postponement; Rescheduling		Stadium: Sand Creek Stadium
Note: Rescheduled for June 10 due to weather

May 16 9	Real Monarchs SLC	1–1	Portland Timbers 2	Sandy, Utah
	Welshman 9'; Orozco (yellow card) 79'	Report	Thoma (yellow card) 43'; Delbridge (yellow card) 76'; Safiu (yellow card) 79'; Winchester 87'	Stadium: Rio Tinto Stadium; Attendance: 2,615; Referee: Alex Krelo

May 22 10	Portland Timbers 2	0–2	Seattle Sounders FC 2	Portland, Oregon
	Payne (yellow card) 28'; Casiple (yellow card) 30'; Belmar (yellow card) 33'; Delbridge (red card) 90+'	Report	Lowe 38'; Craven 55'; Kovar (yellow card) 90'	Stadium: Merlo Field; Attendance: 3,095; Referee: Juan Colazo

May 30 11	Tulsa Roughnecks FC	1–3	Portland Timbers 2	Tulsa, Oklahoma
	Venter 17'; Bond (yellow card) 32'; Galbraith-Knapp (yellow card) 39'; Cordeiro (yellow card) 86'	Report	Gavin (yellow card) 39'; Richards (yellow card) 72'; Nanchoff 64', 74' (pen.); Belmar 90+', (yellow card) 90+'	Stadium: ONEOK Field; Attendance: 5,755; Referee: Tyler Mitcham

June 5 12	Oklahoma City Energy FC	2–0	Portland Timbers 2	Oklahoma City, Oklahoma
	Gonzalez (yellow card) 38'; Greig (yellow card) 42', (goal) 55', 78'	Report	Rose (red card) 28'; Thoma (yellow card) 73'	Stadium: Taft Stadium; Attendance: 3,133; Referee: Rasende Mendoza

June 10 8	Colorado Springs Switchbacks FC	3–1	Portland Timbers 2	Colorado Springs, Colorado
	Gonzalez 25', 35'; Harada 47'; Bejarano (yellow card) 90'	Report	Safiu (yellow card) 76'; Richards 84'	Stadium: Sand Creek Stadium; Attendance: 3,726; Referee: Karen Abt
Note: Rescheduled from May 9 due to weather

June 14 13	Portland Timbers 2	3–1	Austin Aztex	Portland, Oregon
	Gavin 41'; Safiu 45+' (pen.); Winchester (yellow card) 67'; Jeanderson 89', (yellow card) 90+'	Report	Perales (red card) 43'; Caesar 88'	Stadium: Merlo Field; Attendance: 2,605; Referee: Ekaterina Koroleva

June 21 14	Whitecaps FC 2	3–2	Portland Timbers 2	Vancouver, British Columbia
	McKendry 47'; Bustos 53'; Sampson (yellow card) 77', (goal) 81'	Report	Safiu (yellow card) 8'; Thoma (yellow card) 45+'; Gaivn 71'; Belmar 89'	Stadium: Thunderbird Stadium; Attendance: 1,373; Referee: Juan Marquez

June 29 15	Portland Timbers 2	0–2	Seattle Sounders FC 2	Portland, Oregon
		Report	Garza 45+'; Rossi 86'	Stadium: Merlo Field; Attendance: 2,932; Referee: Josh Wilkens

July 2 16	Portland Timbers 2	3–1	Arizona United SC	Portland, Oregon
	Belmar 10'; Safiu 14'; Gavin (yellow card) 38'; Thoma (yellow card) 53'; Payne (yellow card) 84'; Casiple 85'	Report	Ruthven (yellow card) 24'; Valentino (yellow card) 48'; Malki 74'; Blanco (yellow card) 89'	Stadium: Merlo Field; Attendance: 2,410; Referee: Chipalo Street

July 10 17	Whitecaps FC 2	2–1	Portland Timbers 2	Vancouver, British Columbia
	Rosenlund (yellow card) 40', (goal) 47'; Bustos (yellow card) 48'; Schuler (yellow card) 61'; Sandhu (yellow card) 88'; Blasco 63'	Report	Richards (yellow card) 17'; Fatawu 35'	Stadium: Thunderbird Stadium; Attendance: 1,128; Referee: Juan Marquez

July 19 18	Portland Timbers 2	4–2	Whitecaps FC 2	Portland, Oregon
	Belmar 18'; Fatawu 29'; Payne (yellow card) 35'; Fochive 52'; Thoma (yellow card) 83'; Gavin 87'	Report	Earnshaw 9' (pen.); Seymore (yellow card) 49'; Froese (yellow card) 60', (goal) 78'; Rosenlund (yellow card) 83'	Stadium: Merlo Field; Attendance: 2,278; Referee: Farhad Dadhko

July 24 20	Seattle Sounders FC 2	0 - 2	Portland Timbers 2	Tukwila, Washington
				Stadium: Starfire Sports Complex

July 26 20	Portland Timbers 2	0 - 1	LA Galaxy II	Portland, Oregon
				Stadium: Merlo Field

August 1 21	Austin Aztex	1 - 0	Portland Timbers 2	Austin, Texas
				Stadium: Kelly Reeves Athletic Complex

August 8 22	Portland Timbers 2	3 - 4	Oklahoma City Energy FC	Portland, Oregon
				Stadium: Merlo Field

August 16 23	Portland Timbers 2	3 - 1	Whitecaps FC 2	Portland, Oregon
				Stadium: Merlo Field

August 22 24	Portland Timbers 2	2 - 0	Tulsa Roughnecks FC	Portland, Oregon
				Stadium: Merlo Field

August 29 25	Orange County Blues FC	1 - 3	Portland Timbers 2	Irvine, California
				Stadium: Anteater Stadium

September 5 26	Portland Timbers 2	0 - 1	Colorado Springs Switchbacks FC	Portland, Oregon
				Stadium: Merlo Field

September 12 27	Portland Timbers 2	0 - 3	Sacramento Republic FC	Portland, Oregon
				Stadium: Providence Park

September 16 28	LA Galaxy II	1 - 0	Portland Timbers 2	Carson, California
				Stadium: StubHub Center

==== Standings ====
Pos	Team	Pld	W	D	L	GF	GA	GD	Pts	Qualification
1	Orange County Blues	28	14	5	9	38	34	+4	47	Conference semi-finals
2	Oklahoma City Energy	28	13	8	7	44	36	+8	47	Conference semi-finals
3	Colorado Springs Switchbacks	28	14	4	10	53	35	+18	46	First round
4	Sacramento Republic	28	13	7	8	43	31	+12	46	First round
5	LA Galaxy II	28	14	3	11	39	31	+8	45	First round
6	Seattle Sounders 2	28	13	3	12	45	42	+3	42	First round
7	Tulsa Roughnecks	28	11	6	11	49	46	+3	39	
8	Portland Timbers 2	28	11	2	15	38	45	−7	35	
9	Austin Aztex	28	10	3	15	32	41	−9	33	
10	Arizona United	28	10	2	16	31	55	−24	32	
11	Vancouver Whitecaps 2	28	8	6	14	39	53	−14	30	
12	Real Monarchs	28	7	8	13	32	42	−10	29	

Source: 2015 USL schedule
Rules for classification: 1) head-to-head; 2) total wins; 3) total goal differential; 4) total goals scored; 5) disciplinary points; 6) away goals scored; 7) away goal differential; 8) home goals scored; 9) home goal differential; 10) coin toss or drawing of lots

=== U.S. Open Cup ===
May 19 Second round	Michigan Bucks	0–2	(Oregon) Portland Timbers 2	Pontiac, Michigan
19:30 ET	Charalambous (yellow card) 75'	Report; Report	Fatawu (yellow card) 27', (goal) 90+3'; Belmar 56'; Gavin (yellow card) 67'	Stadium: Ultimate Soccer Arenas; Attendance: 467; Referee: Donovan Noocha

May 27 Third round	Seattle Sounders FC 2 (Washington (state))	2–1	(Oregon) Portland Timbers 2	Tukwila, Washington
	Craven (yellow card) 62', (goal) 66'; Garza (yellow card) 93'; Rossi 104'	USSF Report; T2 Report	Clarke 53' (yellow card) 90'; O'Rourke (yellow card) 75'; Besler (yellow card) 86'; Rose (yellow card) 117'	Stadium: Starfire Sports Complex; Attendance: 1,737; Referee: Farhad Dadkho

=== Friendlies ===
July 21 International friendly	Portland Timbers 2 (United States)	4–3	(England) Newcastle United F.C.	Portland, Oregon
	Fatawu 13'; Manning 23'; Peay 30'; Besler 70'; Fochive (yellow card) 77'	Report	Wijnaldum 6'; Abeid (yellow card) 62'; Aarons 75', 76'	Stadium: Providence Park; Attendance: 15,069; Referee: Levi Rippy

== Club ==
=== Kits ===
Primary	Primary Alt.	Secondary	Secondary Alt.	Third

Type	Shirt	Shorts	Socks
Primary	Green / White	White	Green
Primary Alt.	Green / White	Green	Green
Secondary	Red / Black	Red	Red
Secondary Alt.	Red / Black	Black	Red
Third	Dark green	Dark green	Dark Green

=== Executive staff ===
Majority Owner & President	Merritt Paulson
Chief Operating Officer	Mike Golub
General Manager / Technical Director	Gavin Wilkinson
Ground (capacity and dimensions)	Providence Park (20,438 / 110x70 yards)

Updated to match played January 23, 2012
Source: Portland Timbers

=== Coaching staff ===
Position	Staff
Head Coach	Jay Vidovich
Assistant Coach	Andrew Gregor
Assistant Coach	Steve Reese
Strength & Conditioning Coach	Charles Burdick
T2 Athletic Trainer	Taichi Kitagawa

Last updated: July 7, 2015
Source: Portland Timbers 2

== Squad ==
=== Roster ===
Note: Flags indicate national team as defined under FIFA eligibility rules; some limited exceptions apply. Players may hold more than one non-FIFA nationality. Squad correct as of March 26, 2015.

No.	Pos.	Nation	Player
25	DF	USA	Danny O'Rourke
29	GK	USA	Justin Luthy
30	FW	USA	Kharlton Belmar
38	DF	USA	Matt Rose
40	MF	NZL	Tim Payne
44	DF	AUS	Harrison Delbridge
47	DF	JAM	Rennico Clarke
49	FW	GHA	Fatawu Safiu (on loan from Inter Allies)
52	MF	USA	Blair Gavin
55	FW	USA	Brent Richards
73	FW	ARG	Santiago Biglieri
76	GK	USA	Daniel Withrow
77	FW	TRI	Rundell Winchester (on loan from Central FC)
84	MF	USA	Seth Casiple
85	MF	USA	Steven Evans

=== Appearances and goals ===
No.	Pos	Nat	Player	Total		USL		U.S. Open Cup	
No.	Pos	Nat	Player	Apps	Goals	Apps	Goals	Apps	Goals
Goalkeepers
29	GK	(United States) USA	Justin Luthy	7	-10	5	-8	2	-2
30	GK	(United States) USA	Andrew Weber	3	-4	3	-4	0	0
76	GK	(United States) USA	Daniel Withrow	0	0	0	0	0	0
90	GK	(New Zealand) NZL	Jake Gleeson	20	-33	20	-33	0	0
--	GK	(United States) USA	Zach Nelson	0	0	0	0	0	0
Defenders
15	DF	(Brazil) BRA	Jeanderson	15	1	14+1	1	0	0
20	DF	(United States) USA	Taylor Peay	14	0	14	0	0	0
23	DF	(Argentina) ARG	Norberto Paparatto	1	0	1	0	0	0
25	DF	(United States) USA	Danny O'Rourke	1	0	0	0	1	0
28	DF	(United States) USA	Andy Thoma	27	0	25+1	0	1	0
38	DF	(United States) USA	Matt Rose	11	0	3+6	0	1+1	0
44	DF	(Australia) AUS	Harrison Delbridge	20	1	18	1	2	0
45	DF	(United States) USA	Devon Fisher	4	0	4	0	0	0
47	DF	(Jamaica) JAM	Rennico Clarke	17	1	14+1	0	2	1
51	DF	(United States) USA	Peter Prescott	0	0	0	0	0	0
95	DF	(United States) USA	Marco Farfan	0	0	0	0	0	0
Midfielders
4	MF	(Canada) CAN	Will Johnson	3	0	3	0	0	0
11	MF	(Colombia) COL	Dairon Asprilla	2	0	2	0	0	0
17	MF	(United States) USA	Michael Nanchoff	6	2	6	2	0	0
26	MF	(United States) USA	George Fochive	10	4	8	4	2	0
27	MF	(United States) USA	Nick Besler	26	4	22+3	4	0+1	0
35	MF	(United States) USA	Anthony Manning	15	1	15	1	0	0
40	MF	(New Zealand) NZL	Tim Payne	24	0	16+6	0	2	0
50	MF	(United States) USA	Blake Bodily	6	0	2+4	0	0	0
52	MF	(United States) USA	Blair Gavin	26	4	20+4	4	2	0
84	MF	(United States) USA	Seth Casiple	12	1	5+5	1	1+1	0
85	MF	(United States) USA	Steven Evans	11	1	6+4	1	0+1	0
94	MF	(United States) USA	Jose Perez-Flores	0	0	0	0	0	0
96	MF	(United States) USA	Edson Martinez	0	0	0	0	0	0
97	MF	(United States) USA	Terrell Lowe	1	0	0+1	0	0	0
Forwards
10	FW	(Argentina) ARG	Gastón Fernández	1	0	1	0	0	0
30	FW	(United States) USA	Kharlton Belmar	30	13	27+1	12	2	1
31	FW	(Jamaica) JAM	Michael Seaton	5	1	2+3	1	0	0
32	FW	(Zimbabwe) ZIM	Schillo Tshuma	10	0	6+4	0	0	0
49	FW	(Ghana) GHA	Fatawu Safiu	24	8	18+5	7	1	1
55	FW	(United States) USA	Brent Richards	16	1	6+8	1	2	0
73	FW	(Argentina) ARG	Santiago Biglieri	12	0	6+5	0	1	0
77	FW	(Trinidad and Tobago) TRI	Rundell Winchester	24	3	18+4	3	2	0

=== Player movement ===
==== Transfers in ====
No.	Pos.	Player	Transferred from	Fee/notes	Date	Source
25	MF	(United States) Danny O'Rourke	(United States) Portland Timbers	Free	April 1, 2015	
30	FW	(United States) Kharlton Belmar	(United States) VCU Rams (United States) Portland Timbers U23s	Free	April 1, 2015	

==== Loans in ====
No.	Pos.	Player	Loaned from	Start	End	Source
32	FW	(Zimbabwe) Schillo Tshuma	(United States) Portland Timbers	May 1, 2015	September 1, 2015	

==== Loans out ====
No.	Pos.	Player	Loaned to	Start	End	Source
30	FW	(United States) Kharlton Belmar	(United States) New York Cosmos	Oct 1, 2015	undisclosed	timbers.com

==== Transfers out ====
No.	Pos.	Player	Transferred to	Fee/notes	Date	Source
	Head coach	(United States) Jay Vidovich	(United States) Pittsburgh Panthers		Dec 4, 2015	timbers.com

== See also ==
- 2015 Portland Timbers season
- 2015 USL season
