= 2017 Portland Timbers season =

Portland Timbers
2017 season
- President: Merritt Paulson
- Head coach: Caleb Porter
- Stadium: Providence Park; Portland, Oregon (Capacity: 21,144)
- Major League Soccer: Conference: 1st Overall: 6th
- MLS Cup Playoffs: Conference semifinals
- U.S. Open Cup: Fourth round (vs. Seattle Sounders FC)
- Top goalscorer: League: Diego Valeri (21); All: Diego Valeri (21)
- Highest home attendance: League: 21,144
- Lowest home attendance: League: 21,144
- Average home league attendance: League: 21,144
- Biggest win: 5–1 (Mar. 3 vs. Minnesota United FC)
- Biggest defeat: 0–3 (May 6 vs. San Jose Earthquakes)
Primary colors	Secondary colors
- All statistics correct as of 05/17/2017.

The 2017 Portland Timbers season was the 31st season in their existence and the 7th season for the Portland Timbers in Major League Soccer (MLS), the top-flight professional soccer league in the United States and Canada. The season covers the period from November 16, 2016 to the end of MLS Cup Playoffs.

== Season review ==
=== Off season ===
On November 16, 2016, the Portland Timbers announced former player Ned Grabavoy as Director of Scouting and Recruitment.

On November 17, 2016, the Portland Timbers announced former player Jack Jewsbury as Director of Business Development.

On December 1, 2016, the Portland Timbers announced their schedule for the Desert Friendlies and Home Preseason Tournament.

On December 12, 2016, the Portland Timbers announced their first roster moves for the off season by exercising options on Zarek Valentin and Ben Zemanski and declining options on Nick Besler, Neco Brett, Wade Hamilton, Chris Klute, Chris Konopka, Ben Polk, Jermaine Taylor and Andy Thoma.

On December 15, 2016, the Portland Timbers and Steven Taylor mutually agreed to part ways.

On December 20, 2016, the Portland Timbers signed goalkeeper Jeff Attinella from Minnesota United FC.

On December 21, 2016, MLS announced the home opener for each team, having the Portland Timbers host Minnesota United FC as the first match of the league for the 2017 season.

On December 22, 2016, the Portland Timbers signed Costa Rican defensive midfielder David Guzmán from Deportivo Saprissa.

On January 4, 2017, the Portland Timbers signed Costa Rican defender Roy Miller from Deportivo Saprissa.

On January 9, 2017, the Portland Timbers loaned out Lucas Melano to Argentinian side, Club Atlético Belgrano.

On January 12, 2017, the Portland Timbers signed Portland Timbers 2 players Victor Arboleda, Rennico Clarke, and Kendall McIntosh. The Timbers also re-signed Jack Barmby. Hours later, the full 2017 schedule was released.

On January 13, 2017, the Portland Timbers selected Jeremy Ebobisse in the first round as the 4th pick overall in the 2017 MLS SuperDraft. Portland later selected Michael Amick in the second round.

On January 17, 2017, the Portland Timbers selected Russell Cicerone and Romilio Hernandez in the fourth and final round of the 2017 MLS SuperDraft.

=== Preseason ===
On January 23, 2017, the Portland Timbers signed free-agent defender Chance Myers. Dairon Asprilla returned to the club from his loan with Millonarios F.C. The Timbers also announced that they had re-signed defender/midfielder Amobi Okugo.

The Timbers began their first match of the preseason on January 27, 2017, taking on New York Red Bull in Tucson, Arizona. Caleb Porter announced that he would be playing 3 groups, each changing at 30 minutes to give all the players time on the pitch. In the 4th minute, Rennico Clarke would unfortunately send the ball into the Timber's own neat putting New York up 1–0. In the 60th minute, Vincent Bezecourt would be awarded a penalty and would successfully convert it. New York would end up winning with a final score of 0–2.

On January 31, 2017, the Portland Timbers took on Croatian First Division side NK Istra 1961. The Timbers gave up another early goal, this time by Mitrevski in the 5th minute. Portland would soon answer back from a successfully converted penalty from Fanendo Adi in the 16th minute. In the second half, NK Istra would take the lead once again with a goal from Burić in the 75th minute. The Timbers would shortly answer back with a goal from trialist Ordain in the 80th minute with an assist from Ben Zemanski. NK Istra would finally take the lead and win it with penalty taken by Prelčec with a final score of 3–2.

On February 2, 2017, the Portland Timbers signed winger Sebastián Blanco from San Lorenzo as a Designated Player. The Timbers also paid $75,000 to Seattle Sounders FC in General Allocation Money for his rights.

On February 3, 2017, the Portland Timbers signed Lawrence Olum from Sporting Kansas City and Nat Borchers announced his retirement from soccer.

On February 4, 2017, the Portland Timbers played their final match for the Desert Friendlies, taking on their main rivals, the Seattle Sounders. The Timbers would strike first with a goal from Fanendo Adi, assisted by Diego Valeri in the 16th minute. During the second half, Seattle would answer back with a successful converted penalty by Harry Shipp in the 71st minute. Both teams would settle for a draw with a final score of 1–1.

On February 9, 2017, the Portland Timbers opened their home preseason tournament against Real Salt Lake. Diego Valeri would score first in the 35th minute. Diego Chará would be sent off in the 42nd minute from an elbow to the face foul after the referee used the new experimental replay system that is being used in MLS preseason. Shortly after in the 43rd minute, Joao Plata would score a goal from a free kick due to Chará's foul. In the 45th minute Valeri was awarded a penalty and successfully converted it. Darren Mattocks would put the Timbers ahead with a goal, assisted by Jack Barmby, in the 51st minute. Omar Holness would equalize Real Salt Lake with a goal in the 66th minute. The final score would be a draw at 3–3.

On February 12, 2017, the Portland Timbers continued their preseason tournament by taking on one of the newest MLS expansion clubs, Minnesota United FC. In the first half, Minnesota would prove to break through first with two goals from Johan Venegas in the 25th and 32nd minutes. During the 2nd half, Jack McInerney would send the ball in the back of the net in the 51st to cut the lead in half. Finally in the 84th minute Fanendo Adi would score a cheeky back heel goal, assisted by Alvas Powell and Sebastián Blanco to equalize the Timbers. The final would be 2–2.

On February 15, 2017, Portland finished off their preseason tournament against their northern rival, Vancouver Whitecaps FC. Diego Valeri would score first in the 26th minute with an assist from Darlington Nagbe and Vytas. Shortly after in the 28th minute, Fanendo Adi would give Portland another goal, also with the assist from Nagbe and Vytas. Cristian Techera would be the loan scorer for Vancouver in the 79th minute, giving Portland their first preseason victory of the 2017 season. The Timbers also sold the rights of Rodney Wallace to New York City FC for $50,000 in General Allocation Money and $75,000 in Targeted Allocation Money.

On February 25, 2017, the Portland Timbers traveled to Carson, California to play their final preseason match for 2017 against LA Galaxy. Fanendo Adi would receive a brace with the first goal in the 29th minute, assisted by Diego Valeri and David Guzmán. The second in the 56th minute, assisted by Valeri. Daniel Steres would be the loan goal scorer for LA, giving Portland their first preseason road victory with a final score of 2–1.

On March 1, 2017, the Portland Timbers waived forward Jack McInerney.

=== March ===
On March 3, the Timbers opened the 2017 MLS Season at home against new expansion side, Minnesota United FC. The Timbers Army sung the national anthem as tradition since the first MLS match, then raised a Bob Ross "Happy Little Trees" themed tifo. Timber's new center back Lawrence Olum would score the first goal of the season, assisted by Vytas and Diego Valeri in the 14th minute. Shortly after the start of the 2nd half, Valeri would score in the 47th minute, assisted by their newly acquired Designated Player, Sebastián Blanco. Christian Ramirez, assisted by Johan Venegas, gave Minnesota United FC their first goal in Major League Soccer history. In the 82nd minute, the Timbers were awarded a penalty and it was successfully converted by Valeri in the 82nd minute. Fanendo Adi would finish it up with goals in extra time. The first in the 90+1 minute with an assist from Darlington Nagbe. The final goal would come in the 90+3 minute. The Timbers would start the season off strong with 3 points and a +4 goal differential, currently putting them first on the overall table after winning 5–1. It would stand as their strongest home opening win since starting MLS.

On March 12, Portland traveled to Carson, California for their first road match of the season to take on LA Galaxy. The Timbers would start off strong with a counterattack goal from Diego Chará, with an assist from Diego Valeri in the 8th minute. LA's Jelle Van Damme would receive two yellows, one in the 31st minute and another in the 35th, sending him off and putting LA at 10 men. The Timbers would hold strong until the end and secure 3 points and their first league road win in over a year.

On March 18, Portland hosted the undefeated Houston Dynamo. Before the match the Timbers paid tribute to Nat Borchers where he said his goodbye speech. Shortly after, the Timbers Army raised their "Show racism the red card tifo" with the Portlandia statue with the Statue of Liberty crown. The Timbers would be awarded an early penalty kick from a DaMarcus Beasley handball. Diego Valeri would take and successfully convert it in the 11th minute, putting Portland up 1–0. In the 37th minute, Houston would be awarded a penalty from a Diego Chara handball. The shot was taken and successfully converted by Erick Torres in the 38th minute. Just before the end of the 1st half, Houston would get another goal, from Romell Quioto, assisted by Alberth Elis in the 45+2 minute of stoppage time. In the 58th minute, the Timbers would bounce back to equalize the match with a header from Valeri, assisted by Zarek Valentin and Fanendo Adi. In the 66th minute, the Timbers would take control of the match with a goal from David Guzmán from a fantastic pass from Darlington Nagbe who would later be credited for an assist. Finally in the 88th minute, the Timbers would secure the win with a goal from Adi, assisted by Guzmán. The Timbers would continue their win streak with a 4–2 victory making a total 9 points (+7 goal differential) and currently hold first place overall for the 3rd consecutive week.

On March 25, Portland traveled to Columbus to take on Columbus Crew SC. They would be without Darlinton Nagbe and David Guzmán, both of which are currently on international duty. The Timbers would score early in the 4th minute from a goal from Dairon Asprilla, assisted by winger, Sebastián Blanco. Columbus would shortly take control of the match with a goal from Justin Meram in the 11th minute and a goal from Ola Kamara, assisted by Federico Higuaín in the 19th minute. 3 Minutes into first half stoppage time, Fanendo Adi, assisted by Alvas Powell, would find the back of the net, leveling the match 2–2 at the half. The Crew delivered the final blow with a goal from Niko Hansen in the 84th minute, ending the Timber's perfect win streak with a final score of 2–3.

Position at the end of March

Pos	Team	Pld	W	D	L	GF	GA	GD	Pts
1	Portland Timbers	4	3	0	1	12	6	+6	9

=== April ===
Portland began the month of April by hosting the New England Revolution. In the 12th minute, Diego Valeri would put the Timbers up my sending a misguided header from Chris Tierney and sending it to the top left corner of the net. New England would be able to steal away Portland's victory with rebounded shot from Lee Nguyen in the 84th minute. The Timbers would finish the match 1–1 and still in control of 1st place overall.

Position at the end of April

Pos	Team	Pld	W	D	L	GF	GA	GD	Pts
1	Portland Timbers	9	5	2	2	20	12	+8	17

=== May ===
The Timbers traveled to San Jose to take on the Earthquakes for the start of May. Still without Diego Valeri and now Darlington Nagbe announced out due to injury. The Timbers would fall 0–3 for their current worst loss of the season with Chris Wondolowski clutching a brace.

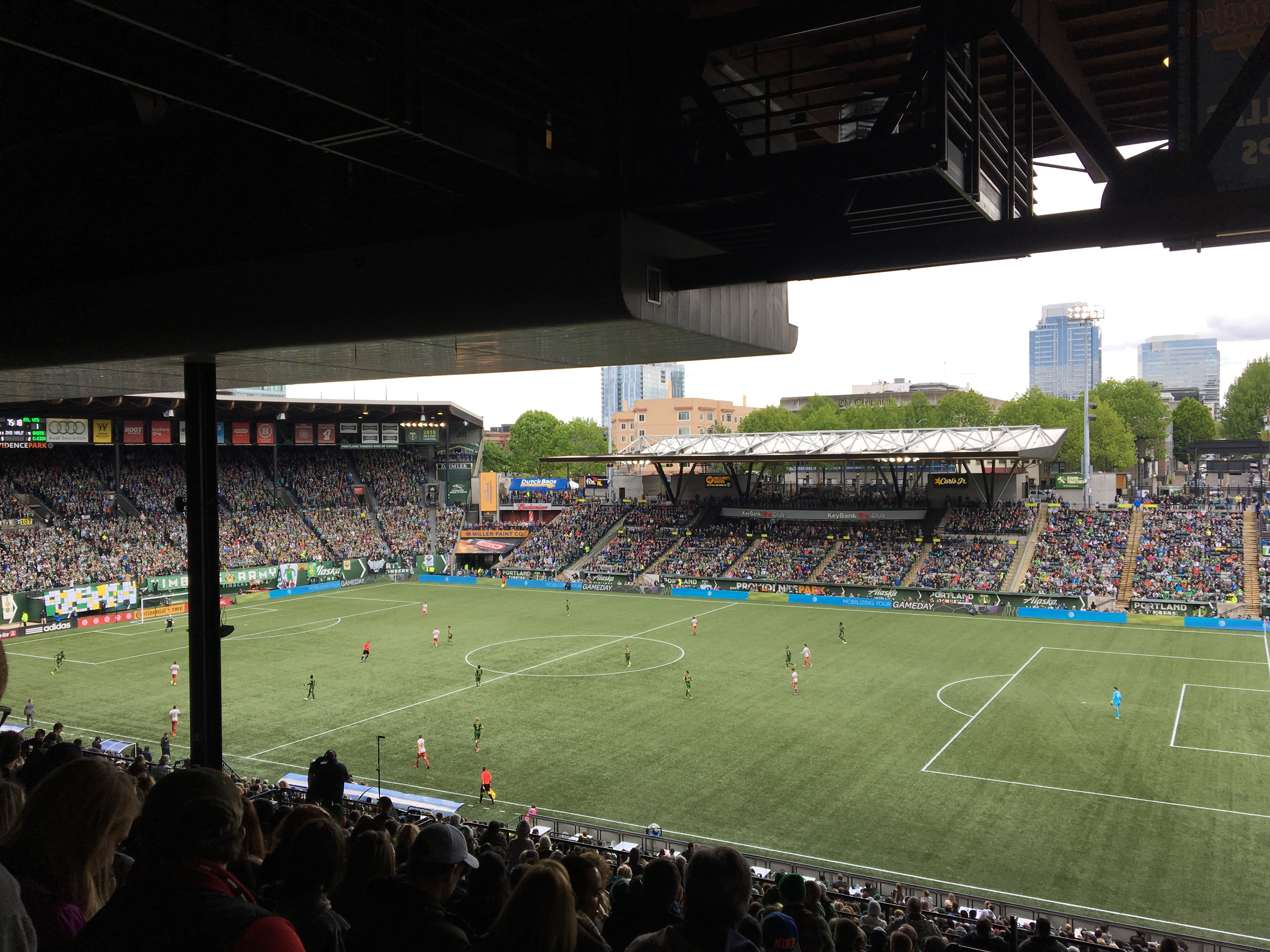
Vs. Atlanta United FC, May 14, 2017

On May 14, the Timbers hosted the Eastern Conference expansion side, Atlanta United FC. Atlanta would score first shortly into the 2nd half. In the 46th minute, Julian Gressel, assisted by Jeff Larentowicz, would send the ball past Jake Gleeson a few yards into the box. Portland would respond in the 50th minute with a header goal from Liam Ridgewell taken from a long free kick by David Guzmán. Both teams would end settle for a point with a final score of 1–1.

On May 20, Portland traveled to Montreal to take on the Impact. Darlington Nagbe would make his return from injury and be in the starting lineup, making all of Portland's starters healthy once again. In the 13th minute, Montreal would be awarded a penalty from an arguable grab from Sebastián Blanco. Ignacio Piatti would take and convert the penalty. In the 18th minute, Diego Chará would receive a straight red from an elbow to the face of Miguel Almirón. This would be Portland's first red card of the season. In the 33rd minute, Blerim Dzemaili would send a howler from distance to be punched away by Jake Gleeson. In the 43rd minute, Kyle Fisher would send high header past Gleeson from a corner kick taken by Dzemaili. In the 45th+1 minute, Diego Valeri would head the ball to the back of the net with an assist from Alvas Powell. In the 50th minute, Piatti received the ball from Anthony Jackson-Hamel and charged through the Portland defense to score from just outside the box. In the 77th minute, Ballou Jean-Yves Tabla would pass the ball to the other side of the box to Ambroise Oyongo who would finish off the match with the final goal. The Timbers would fall 4–1 and have Chará suspended for their Cascadia rivalry match against Seattle Sounders FC.

Position as of May 20

Pos	Team	Pld	W	D	L	GF	GA	GD	Pts
5	Portland Timbers	12	5	3	4	21	18	+3	18

== Competitions ==
=== Competitions overview ===
Competition	Record								Start round	First match	Last match	Final position (Conference)
Competition	G	W	D	L	GF	GA	GD	Win %				
Major League Soccer *	34	15	8	11	60	50	+10	44.12	1	March 3, 2017	October 22, 2017	1st Place
MLS Cup Playoffs	2	0	1	1	1	2	−1	0.00	Semifinals	October 30, 2017	November 5, 2017	Eliminated
U.S. Open Cup	1	0	0	1	1	2	−1	0.00	4th Round	June 13, 2017	June 13, 2017	4th Round
Cascadia Cup *	6	3	2	1	9	7	+2	50.00	8	April 22, 2017	October 22, 2017	1st Place
Total	35	15	8	12	61	62	−1	42.86				

Updated to match played October 22, 2017
Source: Competitions

* Major League Soccer and Cascadia Cup are all part of MLS regular season league play. As a result, only Major League Soccer portion is included in the total.

=== Major League Soccer ===
==== Preseason ====
===== Desert friendlies =====
Win Draw Loss Upcoming fixture

January 27, 2017 1	New York Red Bulls	2–0	Portland Timbers	Tucson, Arizona
17:30 (PST)	Clarke 4' (o.g.); Bezecourt 60' (pen.)	Report	Powell (yellow card) 11'	Stadium: Kino Veterans Memorial Stadium

January 31, 2017 2	NK Istra 1961	3–2	Portland Timbers	Tucson, Arizona
10:00 (PST)	Mitrevski 5'; Burić 75'; Prelčec 88' (pen.)	Report	Adi 16' (pen.); Guzmán (yellow card) 30'; Batista (trialist) (yellow card) 62'; Ordain (trialist) 80' (Zemanski)	Stadium: Kino Veterans Memorial Stadium; Attendance: Closed-door

February 4, 2017 3	Seattle Sounders FC	1–1	Portland Timbers	Tucson, Arizona
17:30 (PST)	Oduro (yellow card) 17'; Shipp 71' (pen.)	Report	Adi 17' (Valeri); Chará (yellow card) 24'	Stadium: Kino Veterans Memorial Stadium

===== Rose City Invitational =====
Win Draw Loss Upcoming fixture

February 9, 2017 1	Portland Timbers	3–3	Real Salt Lake	Portland, Oregon
19:30 (PST)	Valeri (yellow card) 13', (goal) 35', 45' (pen.); Powell (yellow card) 24'; Chará (red card) 42'; Mattocks 51' (Barmby); McInerney (yellow card) 85'	Report	Movsisyan (yellow card) 24'; Mulholland (yellow card) 24', (goal) 53'; Plata 43'; Holness 66'	Stadium: Providence Park; Attendance: 10,117; Referee: Sorin Stoica

February 12, 2017 2	Portland Timbers	2–2	Minnesota United FC	Portland, Oregon
17:00 (PST)	McInerney 51'; Adi	Report	Greenspan (yellow card) 8'; Venegas 25', 32' (Kadrii)	Stadium: Providence Park; Attendance: 13,461

February 15, 2017 3	Portland Timbers	2–1	Vancouver Whitecaps FC	Portland, Oregon
19:30 (PST)	Valeri; Adi; Ridgewell (yellow card) 49'	Report	Laba (yellow card) 63'; Techera 79'; Williams (yellow card) 85'	Stadium: Providence Park; Attendance: 10,286

Pos	Team	GP	W	L	D	GF	GA	GD	Pts
1	(United States) Portland Timbers (C)	3	1	0	2	7	6	+1	5
2	(United States) Real Salt Lake	3	0	0	3	7	7	0	3
3	(United States) Minnesota United FC	3	0	0	3	6	6	0	3
4	(Canada) Vancouver Whitecaps FC	3	0	1	2	3	4	−1	2

===== Los Angeles (friendly) =====
Win Draw Loss Upcoming fixture

February 25, 2017 1	LA Galaxy	1–2	Portland Timbers	Carson, California
20:00 (PST)	Pedro (yellow card) 46'; Steres	Report	Adi 56' (Valeri); Ridgewell (yellow card) 38'; Blanco (yellow card) 61'; Olum (yellow card) 76'	Stadium: StubHub Center; Attendance: 10,364

==== MLS regular season ====
===== Western Conference table at end of season =====
Pos	Team	Pld	W	L	T	GF	GA	GD	Pts	Qualification
1	Portland Timbers	34	15	11	8	60	50	+10	53	MLS Cup Conference Semifinals
2	Seattle Sounders FC	34	14	9	11	52	39	+13	53	MLS Cup Conference Semifinals
3	Vancouver Whitecaps FC	34	15	12	7	50	49	+1	52	MLS Cup Knockout Round
4	Houston Dynamo	34	13	10	11	57	45	+12	50	MLS Cup Knockout Round
5	Sporting Kansas City	34	12	9	13	40	29	+11	49	MLS Cup Knockout Round

Source: MLS

===== Overall standings =====
Pos	Team	Pld	W	L	T	GF	GA	GD	Pts
4	Atlanta United FC	34	15	9	10	70	40	+30	55
5	Columbus Crew	34	16	12	6	53	49	+4	54
6	Portland Timbers	34	15	11	8	60	50	+10	53
7	Seattle Sounders FC	34	14	9	11	52	39	+13	53
8	Vancouver Whitecaps FC	34	15	12	7	50	49	+1	52

Source: MLS
Rules for classification: 1) points; 2) total wins; 3) total goal differential; 4) total goals scored; 5) disciplinary points; 6) away goals scored; 7) away goal differential; 8) coin toss or drawing of lots

===== Matches =====
Win Draw Loss Upcoming fixture

March 3, 2017 1	Portland Timbers	5–1	Minnesota United FC	Portland, Oregon
18:30 (PST)	Olum; Chará (yellow card) 25'; Valeri 47' (Blanco), 82' (pen.); Adi 90+1' (Nagbe), 90+3'	Report	Ramirez 79' (Venegas); Venegas (yellow card) 81'	Stadium: Providence Park; Attendance: 21,144; Referee: Chris Penso

March 12, 2017 2	LA Galaxy	0–1	Portland Timbers	Carson, California
19:30 (PST)	Van Damme (yellow card) 31', (yellow card) 35' (yellow-red card); Garcia (yellow card) 52'	Report	Chará 8' (Valeri); Nagbe (yellow card) 24'; Powell (yellow card) 75'	Stadium: StubHub Center; Attendance: 20,982; Referee: Baldomero Toledo

March 18, 2017 3	Portland Timbers	4–2	Houston Dynamo	Portland, Oregon
19:30 (PST)	Valeri 11' (pen.); Guzmán (yellow card) 20'; Miller (yellow card) 34'; Banco (yellow card) 37'; Chará (yellow card) 37'; Valeri; Guzmán 66' (Nagbe); Nagbe (yellow card) 76'; Adi 88' (Guzmán)	Report	Torres 38' (pen.); Quioto 45+2' (Elis); Torres (yellow card) 39'	Stadium: Providence Park; Attendance: 21,144; Referee: Allen Chapman

March 25, 2017 4	Columbus Crew SC	3–2	Portland Timbers	Columbus, Ohio
16:30 (PST)	Meram 11'; Kamara 19' (Higuaín); Trapp (yellow card) 26'; Artur (yellow card) 63'; Hansen 84'	Report	Asprilla 4' (Blanco); Chará (yellow card) 25'; Adi 45+3' (Powell); Blanco (yellow card) 69'; Valeri (yellow card) 70'	Stadium: MAPFRE Stadium; Attendance: 11,067; Referee: Silviu Petrescu

April 2, 2017 5	Portland Timbers	1–1	New England Revolution	Portland, Oregon
18:00 (PST)	Valeri 12'	Report	Kouassi (yellow card) 44'; Rowe (yellow card) 47'; Nguyen 84'	Stadium: Providence Park; Attendance: 21,144; Referee: Kevin Stott

April 8, 2017 6	Philadelphia Union	1–3	Portland Timbers	Chester, Pennsylvania
16:00 (PST)	Marquez 26' (Medunjanin); Medunjanin (yellow card) 45+3'; Blake (yellow card) 85'; Onyewu (yellow card) 90+4'	Report	Guzmán (yellow card) 16'; Nagbe 32'; Miller 66' (Valeri); Olum (yellow card) 73'; Adi 88' (pen.), (yellow card) 89'	Stadium: Talen Energy Stadium; Attendance: 15,437; Referee: Robert Sibiga

April 15, 2017 7	Portland Timbers	0–1	Sporting Kansas City	Portland, Oregon
19:30 (PST)		Report	Opara (yellow card) 25'; Sinovic (yellow card) 52'; Dwyer	Stadium: Providence Park; Attendance: 21,144; Referee: Drew Fischer

April 22, 2017 8 Cascadia Cup	Portland Timbers	2–1	Vancouver Whitecaps FC	Portland, Oregon
13:00 (PST)	Nagbe 18' (Guzmán); Mattocks; Ridgewell (yellow card) 68'; Barmby (yellow card) 90+4'	Report	Jacobson (yellow card) 42'; Montero 59'; Harvey (yellow card) 64'; Williams (yellow card) 85'	Stadium: Providence Park; Attendance: 21,144; Referee: Chris Penso

April 29, 2017 9	FC Dallas	2–2	Portland Timbers	Frisco, Texas
17:00 (PST)	Figueroa (yellow card) 37'; Urruti 61'; Grana (yellow card) 73'; Akindele	Report	Adi 30' (Guzmán); Andriuškevičius (yellow card) 34'; Blanco	Stadium: Toyota Stadium; Attendance: 16,014; Referee: Baldomero Toledo

May 6, 2017 10	San Jose Earthquakes	3–0	Portland Timbers	San Jose, California
17:00 (PST)	Hyka 8' (Wondolowski); Wondolowski 31' (Jungwirth), 55' (Jungwirth)	Report	Mattocks (yellow card) 45'; Blanco (yellow card) 66'; Andriuskevicius (yellow card) 90+2'	Stadium: Avaya Stadium; Attendance: 18,000; Referee: Nima Saghafi

May 14, 2017 11	Portland Timbers	1–1	Atlanta United FC	Portland, Oregon
13:00 (PST)	Ridgewell 50' (Guzmán); Guzmán (yellow card) 54'; Andriuskevicius (yellow card) 73'; Miller (yellow card) 84'	Report	Parkhurst (yellow card) 28'; Carmona (yellow card) 36'; Gressel 46' (Larentowicz)	Stadium: Providence Park; Attendance: 21,144; Referee: Alan Kelly

May 20, 2017 12	Montreal Impact	4–1	Portland Timbers	Montreal, Quebec
TBD (PST)	Paitti 13' (pen.); Ciman (yellow card) 22'; Fisher 43' (Dzemaili); Paitti 50'; Donadel (yellow card) 51'; Jean-Yves Tabla (yellow card) 66'; Oyongo 77' (Jean-Yves Tabla)	Report	Chará (red card) 18'; Guzmán (yellow card) 27'; Valeri 45+1' (Powell); Miller (yellow card) 71'	Stadium: Stade Saputo; Attendance: 19,138; Referee: Jair Marrufo

May 27, 2017 13 Cascadia Cup	Seattle Sounders FC	1–0	Portland Timbers	Seattle
12:00 (PST)	Roldan; Frei (yellow card) 41'	Report	Okugo (yellow card) 60'	Stadium: CenturyLink Field; Attendance: 47,362; Referee: Mark Geiger

June 2, 2017 14	Portland Timbers	2–1	San Jose Earthquakes	Portland, Oregon
20:00 (PST)	Valeri 50' (Valentin), 90+4'; Chará (yellow card) 57'; Guzmán (yellow card) 61'; Miller (yellow card) 70'	Report	Cerén (yellow card) 36' (yellow-red card) 37'; Thompson 50'; Dawkins 53'	Stadium: Providence Park; Attendance: 21,144; Referee: Kevin Stott

June 10, 2017 15	Portland Timbers	2–0	FC Dallas	Portland, Oregon
19:30 (PST)	Adi; Andriuškevičius (yellow card) 24'; Asprilla (yellow card) 54'	Report	Barrios (yellow card) 10'	Stadium: Providence Park; Attendance: 21,144; Referee: Chris Penso

June 18, 2017 16	Colorado Rapids	2–1	Portland Timbers	Commerce City, Colorado
18:30 (PST)	Badji 51' (Doyle); Gordon (yellow card) 90'	Report	Blanco 18' (Valeri); Valeri (yellow card) 61'	Stadium: Dick's Sporting Goods Park; Attendance: 15,461; Referee: Baldomero Toledo

June 21, 2017 17	Minnesota United FC	3–2	Portland Timbers	Minneapolis, Minnesota
17:00 (PST)	Ramirez 47' (Molino); Calvo 50' (o.g.); Danladi 64' (red card) 70'	Report	Okugo 7' (o.g.); Valeri 37' (pen.); Blanco (red card) 71'	Stadium: TCF Bank Stadium; Attendance: 18,442; Referee: Fotis Bazakos

June 25, 2017 18 Cascadia Cup	Portland Timbers	2–2	Seattle Sounders FC	Portland, Oregon
13:00 (PST)	Powell (yellow card) 10'; Adi 45' (pen.); Asprilla 45+4' (Guzmán); Guzmán (yellow card) 90'	Report	Jones 26'; Evans (red card) 44'; Dempsey	Stadium: Providence Park; Attendance: 21,144; Referee: Ricardo Salazar

July 1, 2017 19	Sporting Kansas City	1–1	Portland Timbers	Kansas City, Kansas
16:00 (PST)	Latif (yellow card) 44'; Espinoza (yellow card) 45'; Sallói 60' (Espinoza); Ellis (yellow card) 85'	Report	Valeri 26' (Blanco); Adi (yellow card) 39'	Stadium: Children's Mercy Park; Attendance: 18,707; Referee: Alan Kelly

July 5, 2017 20	Portland Timbers	2–2	Chicago Fire	Portland, Oregon
19:30 (PST)	Adi 24' (pen.); Blanco 70' (Valeri) (yellow card) 73'	Report	Álvarez 34' (Juninho); Vincent; Lampson (yellow card) 65'	Stadium: Providence Park; Attendance: 21,144; Referee: Robert Sibiga

July 19, 2017 21	Portland Timbers	1–4	Real Salt Lake	Portland, Oregon
19:30 (PST)	Olum (yellow card) 28'; Valentin (yellow card) 41'; Valeri (yellow card) 45+1'; Arboleda (red card) 53'; Adi (red card) 55'; Barmby (yellow card) 81' (goal) 90+3' (Zemanski)	Report	Beckerman 10' (Beltran) (red card) 55'; Rusnák (yellow card) 42' (goal) 68' (Savarino); Acotsa (yellow card) 46'; Plata 50' (pen.), 80' (Acosta); Horst (yellow card) 57'	Stadium: Providence Park; Attendance: 21,144; Referee: Baldomero Toledo

July 23, 2017 22 Cascadia Cup	Vancouver Whitecaps FC	1–2	Portland Timbers	Vancouver, British Columbia
15:00 (PST)	Ebobisse; Blanco 49' (Ebobisse); Miller (yellow card) 79'; Barmby (yellow card) 84'; Zemanski (yellow card) 90'	Report	Jacobson; Mezquida (yellow card) 45+1'; Ousted (yellow card) 77'	Stadium: BC Place; Attendance: 25,082; Referee: Chris Penso

July 29, 2017 23	Houston Dynamo	2–2	Portland Timbers	Houston, Texas
18:00 (PST)	Manotas 37'; Cabezas 81' (Rodriguez) (yellow card) 85'	Report	Valeri; Blando 43' (Valeri); Miller (yellow card) 65'; Chará (yellow card) 68'	Stadium: BBVA Compass Stadium; Attendance: 19,382; Referee: Juan Carlos Rivero

August 6, 2017 24	Portland Timbers	3–1	LA Galaxy	Portland, Oregon
13:00 (PST)	Ridgewell 5' (Guzmán) (yellow card) 58'; Powell (yellow card) 9'; Valeri 33' (Miller); Miller (yellow card) 80'; Guzmán (yellow card) 90+8'	Report	Boateng 6' (João Pedro) (yellow card) 45+1'; Zardes (yellow card) 13'; J. dos Santos (yellow card) 71'; Jones (yellow card) 72'	Stadium: Providence Park; Attendance: 21,144; Referee: Drew Fischer

August 12, 2017 25	Toronto FC	4–1	Portland Timbers	Toronto
TBD (PST)	Morrow 58', 76'; Giovinco (yellow card) 53'; Vázquez; Delgado 87'	Report	Valeri	Stadium: BMO Field; Attendance: 28,415; Referee: Kevin Stott

August 18, 2017 26	Portland Timbers	2–0	New York Red Bulls	Portland, Oregon
17:00 (PST)	Valentin (yellow card) 28'; Valeri 65' (Chará); Mabiala (red card) 80'; Mattocks 90+6' (Valeri)	Report	Escobar (yellow card) 27'; Etienne (yellow card) 28'; Kljestan (yellow card) 85'	Stadium: Providence Park; Attendance: 21,144; Referee: Allen Chapman

August 23, 2017 27	Portland Timbers	2–1	Colorado Rapids	Portland, Oregon
19:30 (PST)	Valeri; Nagbe; Chará (yellow card) 40'; Guzmán (yellow card) 73'	Report	Saeid 28'	Stadium: Providence Park; Attendance: 21,144; Referee: David Gantar

August 27, 2017 28 Cascadia Cup	Seattle Sounders FC	1–1	Portland Timbers	Seattle
18:30 (PST)	Roldan 18'; Nouhou (red card) 90+3'	Report	Blanco (yellow card) 20'; Valeri 45+2' (pen.); Olum (yellow card) 70'	Stadium: CenturyLink Field; Attendance: 51,796; Referee: Mark Geiger

September 9, 2017 29	New York City FC	0–1	Portland Timbers	New York City
TBD (PST)	Sweat (yellow card) 71'; Moralez (yellow card) 88'	Report	Guzmán (yellow card) 22'; Blanco (yellow card) 27'; Valeri 44' (Mattocks) (yellow card) 90+5'; Chara (yellow card) 76'	Stadium: Yankee Stadium; Attendance: 23,651; Referee: Ishmail Elfath

September 16, 2017 30	Real Salt Lake	2–1	Portland Timbers	Sandy, Utah
18:30 (PST)	Rusnák 14'; Savarino; Beckerman (yellow card) 68'; Movsisyan (yellow card) 87'	Report	Valeri 47' (Asprilla); Nagbe (yellow card) 70'	Stadium: Rio Tinto Stadium; Attendance: 19,677; Referee: Robert Sibiga

September 24, 2017 31	Portland Timbers	3–0	Orlando City SC	Portland, Oregon
17:00 (PST)	Valeri 15' (pen.), 59'; Mattocks 29' (Asprilla); Ridgewell (yellow card) 80'	Report	Spector (yellow card) 14' (yellow-red card) 47'; Nocerino (yellow card) 52'; PC (red card) 84'	Stadium: Providence Park; Attendance: 21,144; Referee: Baldomero Toledo

September 30, 2017 32	San Jose Earthquakes	2–1	Portland Timbers	San Jose, California
17:30 (PST)	Qazaishvili 16'; Hoesen 49'; Bernárdez (yellow card) 56'	Report	Andriuskevicius (yellow card) 71'; Blanco 87'	Stadium: Avaya Stadium; Attendance: 18,000; Referee: Kevin Stott

October 15, 2017 33	Portland Timbers	4-0	D.C. United	Portland, Oregon
4:30 (PST)	Valeri 45+3' (pen.); Powell 50' (Valeri); Guzmán (yellow card) 58'; Blanco 60' (Valeri), 86'	Report	Clark (yellow card) 45+3'	Stadium: Providence Park; Attendance: 21,144; Referee: Mark Geiger

October 22, 2017 34 Cascadia Cup	Portland Timbers	2-1	Vancouver Whitecaps FC	Portland, Oregon
13:00 (PST)	Ridgewell 32' (yellow card) 57'; Chara (yellow card) 45'; Mattocks; Guzmán (yellow card) 79'	Report	Waston 29' (Reyna) (yellow card) 89'; Igiebor (yellow card) 30'; Harvey (yellow card) 33'	Stadium: Providence Park; Attendance: 21,144; Referee: Allen Chapman

The 2017 MLS regular-season schedule was released on January 12, 2017.

===== Results by round =====
Matchday	1	2	3	4	5	6	7	8	9	10	11	12	13	14	15	16	17	18	19	20	21	22	23	24	25	26	27	28	29	30	31	32	33	34
Stadium	H	A	H	A	H	A	H	H	A	A	H	A	A	H	H	A	A	H	A	H	H	A	A	H	A	H	H	A	A	A	H	A	H	H
Result	W	W	W	L	D	W	L	W	D	L	D	L	L	W	W	L	L	D	D	D	L	W	D	W	L	W	W	D	W	L	W	L	W	W
Position (Note: Position is based on MLS Western Conference standings and is based where the Timbers are at the end of that match week.)	1	1	1	1	1	1	1	1	2	5	7	10	12	9	5	7	8	8	10	10	10	10	11										2	1

Updated to match(es) played on May 27, 2017. Source: Schedule
A = Away; H = Home; W = Win; D = Draw; L = Loss

===== Results by location =====
Overall								Home						Away					
Pld	W	D	L	GF	GA	GD	Pts	W	D	L	GF	GA	GD	W	D	L	GF	GA	GD
34	15	8	11	56	50	+6	53	11	4	2	34	18	+16	4	4	9	22	32	−10

Last updated: August 22, 2017.
Source: MLS Regular Season

=== MLS Cup Playoffs ===
Win Draw Loss

October 30, 2017	Houston Dynamo	0–0	Portland Timbers	BBVA Compass Stadium, Houston, Texas
21:30 EDT (20:30 CDT)		Report		Attendance: 15,169; Referee: Robert Sibiga

November 5, 2017	Portland Timbers	1–2	Houston Dynamo	Providence Park, Portland, Oregon
19:30 EST (16:30 PST)	Asprilla 39'	Report	Remick 43'; Manotas 77'	Attendance: 21,144; Referee: Ismail Elfath

Houston Dynamo won 2–1 on aggregate.

=== U.S. Open Cup ===
Win Draw Loss Upcoming fixture

June 13, 2017 Fourth Round	Seattle Sounders FC	2–1	Portland Timbers	Tukwila, Washington
19:30 (PST)	Kovar 3' (Tolo); Mathers 54' (pen.)	Report	Hanson (yellow card) 69'	Stadium: Starfire Sports Complex; Attendance: 3,937; Referee: Allen Chapman

=== Cascadia Cup ===
The Cascadia Cup is a trophy that was created in 2004 by supporters of the Portland Timbers, Seattle Sounders FC and Vancouver Whitecaps FC. It is awarded to the club with the best record in MLS regular-season games versus the other participants.

==== Table ====
Pos	Team	GP	W	L	D	GF	GA	GD	Pts
1	Portland Timbers	6	3	1	2	9	7	+2	11
2	Seattle Sounders FC	6	2	1	3	9	6	+3	9
3	Vancouver Whitecaps FC	6	1	4	1	6	11	-5	4

==== Matches ====
Win Draw Loss Upcoming fixture

April 22, 2017 8 Cascadia Cup	Portland Timbers	2–1	Vancouver Whitecaps FC	Portland, Oregon
13:00 (PST)	Nagbe 18' (Guzmán); Mattocks; Ridgewell (yellow card) 68'; Barmby (yellow card) 90+4'	Report	Jacobson (yellow card) 42'; Montero 59'; Harvey (yellow card) 64'; Williams (yellow card) 85'	Stadium: Providence Park; Attendance: 21,144; Referee: Chris Penso

May 27, 2017 13 Cascadia Cup	Seattle Sounders FC	1–0	Portland Timbers	Seattle
12:00 (PST)	Roldan; Frei (yellow card) 41'	Report	Okugo (yellow card) 60'	Stadium: CenturyLink Field; Attendance: 47,362; Referee: Mark Geiger

June 25, 2017 18 Cascadia Cup	Portland Timbers	2–2	Seattle Sounders FC	Portland, Oregon
19:30 (PST)	Powell (yellow card) 10'; Adi 45' (pen.); Asprilla 45+4'; Guzmán (yellow card) 90'	Report	Jones 27'; Evans (red card) 44'; Dempsey 90+4'	Stadium: Providence Park; Attendance: 21,144; Referee: Ricardo Salazar

July 23, 2017 22 Cascadia Cup	Vancouver Whitecaps FC	1–2	Portland Timbers	Vancouver, British Columbia
15:00 (PST)	Ebobisse; Blanco 49' (Ebobisse); Miller (yellow card) 79'; Barmby (yellow card) 84'; Zemanski (yellow card) 90'	Report	Jacobson; Mezquida (yellow card) 45+1'; Ousted (yellow card) 77'	Stadium: BC Place; Attendance: 25,082; Referee: Chris Penso

August 27, 2017 28 Cascadia Cup	Seattle Sounders FC	1–1	Portland Timbers	Seattle
18:30 (PST)	Roldan 18'; Nouhou (red card) 90+3'	Report	Blanco (yellow card) 20'; Valeri 45+2' (pen.); Olum (yellow card) 70'	Stadium: CenturyLink Field; Attendance: 51,796; Referee: Mark Geiger

October 22, 2017 34 Cascadia Cup	Portland Timbers	2-1	Vancouver Whitecaps FC	Portland, Oregon
13:00 (PST)	Ridgewell 32' (yellow card) 57'; Chara (yellow card) 45'; Mattocks; Guzmán (yellow card) 79'	Report	Waston 29' (Reyna) (yellow card) 89'; Igiebor (yellow card) 30'; Harvey (yellow card) 33'	Stadium: Providence Park; Attendance: 21,144; Referee: Allen Chapman

== Club ==
=== Executive staff ===
Position	Staff
Majority Owner & President	Merritt Paulson
Chief Operating Officer	Mike Golub
General Manager / Technical Director	Gavin Wilkinson

Last updated: January 12, 2016
Source: Portland Timbers

=== Coaching staff ===
Position	Staff
Head Coach	Caleb Porter
Assistant Coach	Pablo Moreira
Assistant Coach	Sean McAuley
Assistant Coach	Cameron Knowles
Assistant Coach/Portland Timbers 2 Head Coach	Andrew Gregor
Goalkeeping Coach	Adin Brown
Head Athletic Trainer	Nik Wald, ATC
Assistant Athletic Trainer	Alex Margarito, ATC
Director of Sports Science	Nick Milanos

Last updated: March 13, 2016
Source: Portland Timbers

=== Stadiums ===
Ground (capacity and dimensions)	Providence Park (21,144 / 110x75 yards)
Training Ground	Adidas Training Facility

Source: Providence Park

== Kits ==
Kits are used for a period of two years. Afterwards, a new kit is released. The year for each kit is offset so that one of the two changes each year. The secondary kit is due to change at the end of this year.

=== Primary kit ===
The 2017 primary kit was unveiled on January 11, 2017. It features similar color styles as the 2014–2015 third kit, featuring a darker green and darker yellow colors.

Primary

Type	Shirt	Shorts	Socks
Primary	Dark green/gold with light green plaid style	Dark green/gold	Dark green/gold

=== Secondary kit ===
The secondary kit will be used from 2016 until the end of the 2017 season. It features a red fading to black hoop style with each fade's border being the shape of thorns which represents Portland's nickname, the Rose City. The kit however is not full hoops, the back is a solid red where the player's name and number are featured. The kit also has an alternative Alaska Airlines logo, however, with "Airlines" in small font below the logo.

Secondary

Type	Shirt	Shorts	Socks
Secondary	Red / Black	Black	Red

== Squad information ==
=== First-team squad ===
All players contracted to the club during the season included.
Last updated: September 13, 2017

No.	Name	Nationality	Positions	Date of birth (age)	Signed from	Year with club (year signed)
Goalkeepers
1	Jeff Attinella	(United States)	GK	September 29, 1988 (age 38)	(United States) Minnesota United FC	1 (2017)
43	Kendall McIntosh	(United States)	GK	January 24, 1994 (age 32)	(United States) Portland Timbers 2	1 (2017)
90	Jake Gleeson	(New Zealand)	GK	June 26, 1990 (age 36)	(United States) Portland Timbers U23s	7 (2011)
Defenders
2	Alvas Powell	(Jamaica)	RB	July 18, 1994 (age 32)	(Jamaica) Portmore United FC	5 (2013)
4	Chance Myers	(United States)	DF	December 7, 1987 (age 38)	MLS Free Agent	1 (2017)
5	Vytautas Andriuškevičius (INT)	(Lithuania)	LB / CB	October 8, 1990 (age 35)	(Netherlands) SC Cambuur	2 (2016)
7	Roy Miller	(Costa Rica)	CB	November 28, 1984 (age 41)	(Costa Rica) Deportivo Saprissa	1 (2017)
12	Gbenga Arokoyo (INT)	(Nigeria)	DF	September 4, 1992 (age 34)	(Turkey) Gaziantepspor	2 (2016)
13	Lawrence Olum	(Kenya)	CB / DM	July 10, 1984 (age 42)	(United States) Sporting Kansas City	1 (2017)
16	Zarek Valentin	(United States)	LB	August 6, 1991 (age 35)	(Norway) FK Bodø/Glimt	2 (2016)
18	Amobi Okugo	(United States)	LB / CB / MF	March 13, 1991 (age 35)	(United States) New York Red Bulls II	2 (2016)
24	Liam Ridgewell (INT)	(England)	CB / LB	June 21, 1984 (age 42)	(England) West Bromwich Albion	3 (2014)
25	Bill Tuiloma (INT)	(New Zealand)	DF / CDM	March 27, 1995 (age 31)	(France) Marseille	1 (2017)
33	Larrys Mabiala (INT)	(Democratic Republic of the Congo)	DF	October 8, 1987 (age 38)	(Turkey) Kayserispor	1 (2017)
47	Rennico Clarke	(Jamaica)	DF	August 27, 1995 (age 31)	(United States) Portland Timbers 2	1 (2017)
95	Marco Farfan (HG)	(United States)	LB	November 12, 1998 (age 27)	(United States) Portland Timbers 2	1 (2017)
Midfielders
6	Darlington Nagbe	(United States)	LW / CAM / RW / FW	July 19, 1990 (age 36)	(United States) 2011 MLS SuperDraft	7 (2011)
8	Diego Valeri (DP)	(Argentina)	CAM	May 1, 1986 (age 40)	(Argentina) Club Atlético Lanús	5 (2013)
10	Sebastián Blanco (DP) (INT)	(Argentina)	MF / FW	March 15, 1988 (age 38)	(Argentina) San Lorenzo	1 (2017)
11	Dairon Asprilla	(Colombia)	RW / LW / FW	May 25, 1992 (age 34)	(Colombia) Atlético Nacional	3 (2015)
14	Ben Zemanski	(United States)	CDM	May 12, 1988 (age 38)	(United States) Chivas USA	5 (2013)
20	David Guzmán (INT)	(Costa Rica)	CDM	February 18, 1990 (age 36)	(Costa Rica) Deportivo Saprissa	1 (2017)
21	Diego Chara	(Colombia)	CDM	April 5, 1986 (age 40)	(Colombia) Deportes Tolima	7 (2011)
23	Jack Barmby (INT)	(England)	LB / LW / RW / ST	November 14, 1994 (age 31)	(England) Leicester City	2 (2016)
Forwards
9	Fanendo Adi (INT) (DP)	(Nigeria)	CF	October 10, 1990 (age 35)	(Denmark) F.C. Copenhagen	3 (2015)
17	Jeremy Ebobisse (GA)	(United States)	FW	February 14, 1997 (age 29)	(United States) 2017 MLS SuperDraft	1 (2017)
22	Darren Mattocks	(Jamaica)	CF / LW / RW	September 2, 1990 (age 36)	(Canada) Vancouver Whitecaps FC	2 (2016)
26	Lucas Melano (Loaned)	(Argentina)	CF / LW / RW	March 1, 1993 (age 33)	(Argentina) Club Atlético Lanús	3 (2015)
73	Victor Arboleda	(Colombia)	FW / MF	January 1, 1997 (age 29)	(United States) Portland Timbers 2	1 (2017)

- (HG) = Homegrown Player
- (GA) = Generation Adidas Player
- (DP) = Designated Player
- (INT) = Player using International Roster Slot
- (Loan) = On Loan
- (Loaned) = Loaned out to another club

== Player/Staff Transactions ==
=== Transfers in ===
Date	Player	Positions	Previous club	Fee/notes	Ref
December 20, 2016	(United States) Jeff Attinella	GK	(United States) Minnesota United FC	Traded for second-round pick in the 2018 MLS SuperDraft.	
December 22, 2016	(Costa Rica) David Guzmán	CDM	(Costa Rica) Deportivo Saprissa	Undisclosed	
January 4, 2017	(Costa Rica) Roy Miller	DF	(Costa Rica) Deportivo Saprissa	Undisclosed	
January 12, 2017	(Colombia) Victor Arboleda	FW / MF	(United States) Portland Timbers 2	Undisclosed	
January 12, 2017	(Jamaica) Rennico Clarke	DF	(United States) Portland Timbers 2	Undisclosed	
January 12, 2017	(United States) Kendall McIntosh	GK	(United States) Portland Timbers 2	Undisclosed	
January 23, 2017	(United States) Chance Myers	DF	(United States) Sporting Kansas City	Signed as a free agent.	
February 2, 2017	(Argentina) Sebastián Blanco	MF / FW	(Argentina) San Lorenzo de Almagro	Signed as a Designated Player.	
February 3, 2017	(Kenya) Lawrence Olum	CB / DM	(United States) Sporting Kansas City	Exchanged for $50,000 in General Allocation Money and the Timbers natural first-round pick in the 2018 MLS SuperDraft.	
September 20, 2017	(United States) Derrick Tellez	GK		Signed to one-game contract through Make-A-Wish Foundation	

=== Loans out ===
Date	Player	Positions	Destination club	Fee/notes	Ref
January 9, 2017	(Argentina) Lucas Melano	FW	(Argentina) Club Atlético Belgrano	On loan until Dec. 31, 2017	

=== Transfers out ===
Date	Player	Positions	Destination club	Fee/notes	Ref
December 12, 2016	(United States) Nick Besler	CM	(United States) Real Monarchs	Option declined.	
December 12, 2016	(Jamaica) Neco Brett	RW / FW	(United States) Portland Timbers 2	Option declined.	
December 12, 2016	(United States) Wade Hamilton	GK	(United States) Portland Timbers 2	Option declined.	
December 12, 2016	(United States) Chris Klute	LB	N/A	Option declined.	
December 12, 2016	(United States) Chris Konopka	GK	(Canada) FC Edmonton	Option declined	
December 12, 2016	(England) Ben Polk	CF	(United States) Orlando City B	Option declined.	
December 12, 2016	(Jamaica) Jermaine Taylor	LB / CB / RB	(United States) Minnesota United FC	Option declined.	
December 12, 2016	(United States) Andy Thoma	DF	(Canada) Whitecaps FC 2	Option declined.	
December 12, 2016	(United States) Taylor Peay	DF	(United States) Real Monarchs	Out of contract.	
December 15, 2016	(England) Steven Taylor	CB	(England) Ipswich Town	Mutual agreement to terminate contract.	
February 3, 2016	(United States) Nat Borchers	CB	N/A	Announced retirement from soccer	
March 1, 2016	(United States) Jack McInerney	FW	(United States) LA Galaxy	Waived.	

=== Contract extensions ===
Date	Player	Positions	Year with club (year signed)	Notes	Ref
December 12, 2016	(United States) Zarek Valentin	LB	2 (2016)		
December 12, 2016	(United States) Ben Zemanski	CDM	5 (2013)		
January 23, 2017	(United States) Amobi Okugo	DF / MF	2 (2016)		

=== Player's rights purchased ===
Date	Player	Positions	Targeted Allocation Money (TAM)	General Allocation Money (GAM)	From	Notes	Ref
February 2, 2017	(Argentina) Sebastián Blanco	MF / FW	–	$75,000	Seattle Sounders FC		

=== Player's rights sold ===
Date	Player	Positions	Targeted Allocation Money (TAM)	General Allocation Money (GAM)	To	Notes	Ref
January 9, 2017	(United States) Christian Volesky	FW	–	–	Sporting Kansas City	Traded for 4th round 2017 MLS SuperDraft pick.	
February 15, 2017	(Costa Rica) Rodney Wallace	MF / FW	$50,000	$75,000	New York City FC		

=== 2016 MLS Re-Entry Draft Picks ===
Stage (Round Pick/#)	Player	Positions	Previous club	Notes	Ref
1 (1 / #8)	PASS				
2 (1 / #8)	PASS				

=== 2017 MLS SuperDraft Picks ===
Any player marked with a * is part of the Generation Adidas program.

Round Pick (Overall)	Player	Positions	Previous club	Notes	Ref
1 (4)	Jeremy Ebobisse*	FW	(United States) Duke Blue Devils	Houston Dynamo traded 4th pick to Portland for an international slot, $100,000 in general allocation money, and the tenth draft pick.	
2 (32)	Michael Amick	DF	(United States) UCLA		
3 (54)	–			Given to New York City FC as part of a trade on August 2, 2016 for the rights to defender Gbenga Arokoyo.	
4 (76)	Russell Cicerone	MF	(United States) Michigan Bucks		
4 (80)	Romilio Hernandez	MF	(United States) Portland Timbers U23s	Received in a trade on January 9, 2017 from Sporting Kansas City for Christian Volesky.	

=== Staff in ===
Date	Name	Position	Previous club	Notes	Ref
November 16, 2016	(United States) Ned Grabavoy	Director of Scouting and Recruitment	Portland Timbers (Player)		
November 17, 2016	(United States) Jack Jewsbury	Director of Business Development	Portland Timbers (Player)		

=== Staff Contract Extensions ===
Date	Name	Position	Notes	Ref

=== Staff out ===
Date	Name	Position	Destination club	Notes	Ref
November 16, 2017	(United States) Caleb Porter	Manager			

=== National Team participation ===
Four Timbers player have been called up to play for their national teams during this season.

Team	Players	# of call-ups	Ref
United States	Darlington Nagbe	2	
Costa Rica	David Guzmán	2	
Jamaica	Alvas Powell	1	
Lithuania	Vytautas Andriuškevičius	1	

== Honors and awards ==
=== MLS Player of the Week ===
Week	Result	Player	Ref
1	Won	(Argentina) Diego Valeri	

=== MLS Goal of the Week ===
Week	Result	Player	Ref
1	Nominated	(Nigeria) Fanendo Adi	
5	Won	(Argentina) Diego Valeri	
6	Nominated	(United States) Darlington Nagbe	
8	Won	(United States) Darlington Nagbe	

=== MLS Save of the Week ===
Week	Result	Player	Ref
2	Won	(New Zealand) Jake Gleeson	

== Statistics ==
=== Appearances ===
No.	Pos.	Name	MLS				MLS Playoffs				U.S. Open Cup				Total			
No.	Pos.	Name	Apps	Goals	Yellow card	Red card	Apps	Goals	Yellow card	Red card	Apps	Goals	Yellow card	Red card	Apps	Goals	Yellow card	Red card
1	GK	(United States) Jeff Attinella	3	0	0	0	0	0	0	0	0	0	0	0	3	0	0	0
2	DF	(Jamaica) Alvas Powell	12	0	1	0	0	0	0	0	0	0	0	0	12	0	1	0
4	DF	(United States) Chance Myers	0	0	0	0	0	0	0	0	0	0	0	0	0	0	0	0
5	DF	(Lithuania) Vytautas Andriuškevičius	7	0	3	0	0	0	0	0	0	0	0	0	7	0	3	0
6	MF	(United States) Darlington Nagbe	10	2	2	0	0	0	0	0	0	0	0	0	10	2	2	0
7	DF	(Costa Rica) Roy Miller	9	1	3	0	0	0	0	0	0	0	0	0	9	1	3	0
8	MF	(Argentina) Diego Valeri	11	6	1	0	0	0	0	0	0	0	0	0	11	6	1	0
9	FW	(Nigeria) Fanendo Adi	12	6	1	0	0	0	0	0	0	0	0	0	12	6	1	0
10	MF	(Argentina) Sebastián Blanco	12 (1)	1	3	0	0	0	0	0	0	0	0	0	12 (1)	1	3	0
11	MF	(Colombia) Dairon Asprilla	5 (4)	1	0	0	0	0	0	0	0	0	0	0	5 (4)	1	0	0
12	DF	(Nigeria) Gbenga Arokoyo	0	0	0	0	0	0	0	0	0	0	0	0	0	0	0	0
13	DF	(Kenya) Lawrence Olum	11 (1)	1	1	0	0	0	0	0	0	0	0	0	11 (1)	1	1	0
14	MF	(United States) Ben Zemanski	0 (1)	0	0	0	0	0	0	0	0	0	0	0	0 (1)	0	0	0
16	DF	(United States) Zarek Valentin	3 (1)	0	0	0	0	0	0	0	0	0	0	0	3 (1)	0	0	0
17	FW	(United States) Jeremy Ebobisse	0 (1)	0	0	0	0	0	0	0	0	0	0	0	0 (1)	0	0	0
18	DF	(United States) Amobi Okugo	1 (3)	0	1	0	0	0	0	0	0	0	0	0	1 (3)	0	1	0
20	MF	(Costa Rica) David Guzmán	12	1	4	0	0	0	0	0	0	0	0	0	12	1	4	0
21	MF	(Colombia) Diego Chará	12	1	3	1	0	0	0	0	0	0	0	0	12	1	3	1
22	FW	(Jamaica) Darren Mattocks	2 (8)	1	1	0	0	0	0	0	0	0	0	0	2 (8)	1	1	0
23	MF	(England) Jack Barmby	0 (6)	0	1	0	0	0	0	0	0	0	0	0	0 (6)	0	1	0
24	DF	(England) Liam Ridgewell	7	1	1	0	0	0	0	0	0	0	0	0	7	1	1	0
43	GK	(United States) Kendall McIntosh	0	0	0	0	0	0	0	0	0	0	0	0	0	0	0	0
47	DF	(Jamaica) Rennico Clarke	0	0	0	0	0	0	0	0	0	0	0	0	0	0	0	0
73	FW	(Colombia) Victor Arboleda	0 (1)	0	0	0	0	0	0	0	0	0	0	0	0 (1)	0	0	0
90	GK	(New Zealand) Jake Gleeson	10	0	0	0	0	0	0	0	0	0	0	0	10	0	0	0
95	DF	(United States) Marco Farfan	4	0	0	0	0	0	0	0	0	0	0	0	4	0	0	0
Players who were transferred/waived from the club during active season or on loan
26	FW	(Argentina) Lucas Melano	0	0	0	0	0	0	0	0	0	0	0	0	0	0	0	0

Last updated: May 27, 2017.
Source: Portland Timbers

=== Goalkeeper stats ===
The list is sorted by total minutes played then by jersey number.

No.	Player	MLS				MLS Playoffs				U.S. Open Cup				Total			
No.	Player	MIN	GA	GAA	SV	MIN	GA	GAA	SV	MIN	GA	GAA	SV	MIN	GA	GAA	SV
90	(New Zealand) Jake Gleeson	900	14	1.40	28	0	0	0.00	0	0	0	0.00	0	900	14	1.40	28
1	(United States) Jeff Attinella	270	6	2.00	10	0	0	0.00	0	0	0	0.00	0	270	6	2.00	10
43	(United States) Kendall McIntosh	0	0	0.00	0	0	0	0.00	0	0	0	0.00	0	0	0	0.00	0
	TOTALS	1170	20	1.54	38	0	0	0.00	0	0	0	0.00	0	1170	20	1.54	38

Last updated: May 27, 2017.
Source: Portland Timbers

=== Line-up ===
As of May 27, 2017

Visual

Formation: 4–2–3–1

Most recent starting line-up

No.	Pos.	Nat.	Name	MS	Notes
90	GK	(New Zealand)	Jake Gleeson	10	(Note: Jeff Attinella has 3 starts.)
16	RB	(United States)	Zarek Valentin	3	(Note: Alvas Powell has 12 starts.)
7	CB	(Costa Rica)	Roy Miller	9	
24	CB	(England)	Liam Ridgewell(c)	7	
5	LB	(Lithuania)	Vytautas Andriuskevicius	7	(Note: Marco Farfan has 4 starts.)
20	DM	(Costa Rica)	David Guzmán	12	(Note: Amobi Okugo has 1 start.)
13	DM	(Colombia)	Lawrence Olum	11	(Note: Diego Chará has 12 starts.)
10	LM	(Argentina)	Sebastián Blanco	12	(Note: Dairon Asprilla has 5 starts.)
8	CM	(Argentina)	Diego Valeri	11	
6	RM	(United States)	Darlington Nagbe	10	(Note: Darren Mattocks has 2 starts.)
9	CF	(Nigeria)	Fanendo Adi	12	

Previous starters

=== Top scorers ===
The list is sorted by shirt number when total goals are equal.

Rnk	Pos	No.	Player	MLS	MLS Cup Playoffs	U.S. Open Cup	Total
1	FW	9	(Nigeria) Fanendo Adi	6	0	0	6
1	MF	8	(Argentina) Diego Valeri	6	0	0	6
3	MF	6	(United States) Darlington Nagbe	2	0	0	2
4	DF	7	(Costa Rica) Roy Miller	1	0	0	1
4	MF	8	(Colombia) Diego Chará	1	0	0	1
4	MF	10	(Argentina) Sebastián Blanco	1	0	0	1
4	FW	11	(Jamaica) Darren Mattocks	1	0	0	1
4	DF	13	(Kenya) Lawrence Olum	1	0	0	1
4	MF	20	(Costa Rica) David Guzmán	1	0	0	1
4	DF	24	(England) Liam Ridgewell	1	0	0	1
4	MF	27	(Colombia) Dairon Asprilla	1	0	0	1
Own goals				0	0	0	0
TOTALS				22	0	0	22

Last updated: May 27, 2017.
Source: Portland Timbers

=== Top assists ===
The list is sorted by shirt number when total assists are equal.

Rnk	Pos	No.	Player	MLS	MLS Cup Playoffs	U.S. Open Cup	Total
1	MF	8	(Argentina) Diego Valeri	4	0	0	4
1	MF	20	(Costa Rica) David Guzmán	4	0	0	4
3	DF	2	(Jamaica) Alvas Powell	3	0	0	3
3	MF	6	(United States) Darlington Nagbe	3	0	0	3
5	FW	9	(Nigeria) Fanendo Adi	2	0	0	2
5	MF	10	(Argentina) Sebastián Blanco	2	0	0	2
7	DF	5	(Lithuania) Vytautas Andriuškevičius	1	0	0	1
7	MF	16	(United States) Zarek Valentin	1	0	0	1
TOTALS				20	0	0	20

Last updated: May 27, 2017.
Source: Portland Timbers

=== Clean sheets ===
The list is sorted by shirt number when total clean sheets are equal.

Rnk	No.	Player	MLS	MLS Cup Playoffs	U.S. Open Cup	Total
1	90	(New Zealand) Jake Gleeson	1	0	0	1
2	1	(United States) Jeff Attinella	0	0	0	0
2	43	(United States) Kendall McIntosh	0	0	0	0
TOTALS			1	0	0	1

Last updated: May 27, 2017.
Source: Portland Timbers

=== Summary ===
Games played	13 (13 Major League Soccer)
Games won	5 (5 Major League Soccer)
Games drawn	3 (3 Major League Soccer)
Games lost	5 (5 Major League Soccer)
Goals scored	22 (22 Major League Soccer)
Goals conceded	20 (20 Major League Soccer)
Goal difference	+2 (+2 Major League Soccer)
Clean sheets	1 (1 Major League Soccer)
Yellow cards	27 (27 Major League Soccer)
Red cards	1 (1 Major League Soccer)
Most appearances	(Argentina) Sebastián Blanco (13 Appearances)
Top scorer	(Argentina) Diego Valeri, (Nigeria) Fanendo Adi (6 goals)
Top assists	(Argentina) Diego Valeri, (Costa Rica) David Guzmán (4 assists)
Top clean sheets	(New Zealand) Jake Gleeson (1 clean sheet)
Winning percentage	Overall: 5/13 (38.46%)

Last updated: May 27, 2017.
Source: Portland Timbers
