= Steve Palacios =

American soccer player

Personal information
- Full name: Steve Cisneros Palacios
- Date of birth: May 20, 1993 (age 33)
- Place of birth: San Clemente, California, United States
- Height: 6 ft 0 in (1.83 m)
- Position: Midfielder

Youth career
- –2011: United FC
- 2010: Chivas USA

College career
Years	Team	Apps	(Gls)
2011–2014	Cal Poly Mustangs	66	(2)

Senior career*
Years	Team	Apps	(Gls)
2012	Orange County Blue Star	8	(1)
2013–2014	Ventura County Fusion	19	(2)
2016	Portland Timbers 2	2	(0)
Total		29	(3)
- * Club domestic league appearances and goals

Steve Cisneros Palacios (born May 20, 1993) is an American retired soccer player who played as a midfielder. A native of San Clemente, California, he played on the varsity team at San Clemente High School. As a senior, Palacios helped the Tritons to the first CIF Southern Section championship in team history and was named the All-Orange County Player of the Year by the Orange County Register. He played college soccer at Cal Poly, appearing in 66 games over four years with the Mustangs.

While in college, Palacios played summer seasons with Orange County Blue Star and Ventura County Fusion. In 2014, his second season with the Fusion, he helped the team finish as winners of the Premier Development League's Southwest Division. After spending the 2015 season as a practice player for LA Galaxy II, Palacios signed with United Soccer League club Portland Timbers 2 in 2016. He made two appearances in his lone season as a professional before ending his career.

After retiring from professional soccer, Palacios enlisted in the United States Army. He was part of the Army team at the 2019 Armed Forces Men's Soccer Championship and scored the winning goal in the championship match. Palacios then competed at the 2019 Military World Games as part of the United States Armed Forces team.

== Early life and youth career ==
Steve Cisneros Palacios was born on May 20, 1993, in San Clemente, California, the second of three sons to Alfredo and Paula Palacios. All three boys played soccer, and Steve trained with his older brother's teams while he was growing up. He attended San Clemente High School and played four years of varsity soccer for the Tritons. Palacios ended his high school career sitting second all-time in both goals and assists at San Clemente, and as a senior in 2011, helped the Tritons to their first-ever CIF Southern Section title. Following that title, he was named as the All-Orange County Player of the Year by the Orange County Register and earned a First Team All-CIF Southern Section nod.

Palacios played his youth soccer with United FC, a youth development club in San Juan Capistrano, California. He earned selections to the California Olympic Development Program (ODP) and playied alongside Zinedine Zidane at the Adidas ESP camp. He represented California South at the 2010 United States Youth Soccer Association ODP Championships. Palacios also spent time with Chivas USA, playing for their academy at the 2010 SUM U-17 Cup. Ranked as the number 76 recruit nationally by College Soccer News, he committed to play college soccer at California Polytechnic State University, San Luis Obispo, part of a recruiting class that also included Matt LaGrassa, Chase Minter, and Keegan Smith.

While in high school, Palacios earned multiple call-ups to camps for the United States men's national under-18 soccer team. He made his first camp appearance in October 2009, earning the call in part due to his performance at the Adidas ESP camp. Palacios also appeared at a camp in February 2011 that included friendly matches against three Major League Soccer teams. Additionally, prior to enrolling at Cal Poly, Palacios went on trial in the Netherlands with SC Heerenveen.

== College and amateur career ==
After being an unused substitute in the first seven games of his freshman season, Palacios made his Cal Poly Mustangs' debut on September 25, 2011, coming off the bench in a 3–1 defeat against the Denver Pioneers. He earned his first collegiate start three days later, playing 48 minutes as the Mustangs upset the no. 7 UC Irvine Anteaters by a 1–0 scoreline. Although he played in just 10 games as a freshman, Palacios carved out a reliable role as a sophomore and appeared 18 times. He was one of the primary corner kick takers for Cal Poly, helping the team qualify for the Big West Conference Men's Soccer Tournament for the first time in two years.

As a junior, Palacios appeared in a career-high 20 games for the Mustangs and tallied the first two assists of his collegiate career. The first of those came on September 5, 2013, in a 3–0 victory over the sixth-ranked UCLA Bruins, the highest-ranked team that Cal Poly had ever beaten. He assisted Chase Minter for the first goal of the game in the 11th minute. Palacios followed that up as a senior with his first career goals, scoring twice in 18 appearances. He was the only senior on the Mustangs roster, although 10 other lettermen returned as well. His two goals came in back-to-back games, helping the Mustangs defeat the NC State Wolfpack on August 31, 2014, and the Northern Illinois Huskies on September 5. Palacios ended his college career having tallied two goals and two assists in 66 appearances across four years at Cal Poly.

=== Summer leagues ===
Following his freshman season at Cal Poly, Palacios played in the Premier Development League (PDL) with Orange County Blue Star. He made eight appearances during the 2012 PDL season and scored one goal as the club finished in seventh place in the Southwest Division.

During the following two summer seasons, 2013 and 2014, Palacios remained in the PDL and played with Ventura County Fusion. He led the team in appearances in 2013, as he was the only player to appear in every match of the season. Palacios totaled two goals and two assists from 14 games in league play, appeared in both of the Fusion's matches in the 2013 U.S. Open Cup, and came off the bench in the playoffs against Victoria Highlanders. He returned to Ventura County in 2014 and played eight times in all competitions as the Fusion won the PDL's Southwest Division. In Palacios' final game with the club, against Kitsap Pumas in the Western Conference playoffs, he picked up a red card in extra time as Ventura County was eliminated in penalties.

== Club career ==
Following his time at Cal Poly, Palacios was eligible to be selected in the 2015 MLS SuperDraft but went undrafted. He signed with United Soccer League (USL) club LA Galaxy II as a practice player and spent the 2015 season in that role. Although Palacios was given the number 51 shirt by the team, he was not eligible to make league appearances and played his only game for the club in a postseason friendly against Sacramento Republic on November 14.

=== Portland Timbers 2 ===
On March 24, 2016, Palacios signed with fellow USL club Portland Timbers 2. He made his club and professional debut over two months later, replacing Terrell Lowe in stoppage time of a 1–0 victory against Seattle Sounders FC 2. Palacios made just one more appearance for T2: coming off the bench against Swope Park Rangers on June 4. He finished his lone season in Portland, and subsequently wrapped up his professional career, with just the two games played.

== Military career ==
After ending his professional soccer career, Palacios enlisted in the United States Army as a specialist in 2017. While assigned to Camp Humphreys in Pyeongtaek, South Korea, he was chosen to represent the Army team at the 2019 Armed Forces Men's Soccer Championship. In the championship match against the United States Air Force team, Palacios scored the winning goal in second half stoppage time, giving Army a 2–1 victory and their first tournament title since 2015. At the conclusion of the tournament, he was selected to the United States Armed Forces team to compete at the 2019 Military World Games. Palacios and the United States were eliminated in the group stage at the games, losing all three matches. During his time in the Army, Palacios also served at Fort Drum in Le Ray, New York, before his enlistment ended and he transitioned to service in the California Army National Guard.

== Coaching career ==
While still an active soccer player, Palacios began coaching. He ran youth soccer camps while at Cal Poly, and during his time with LA Galaxy II, he was on the staff of the San Clemente Surf youth club. In 2022, Palacios served as an assistant coach for the boys' team at San Clemente High School, his alma mater.

== Personal life ==
Palacios is the second of three children in his family, alongside brothers Kevin and Oscar. He graduated from Cal Poly with a Bachelor of Science in recreation, parks, and tourism administration, then earned a Master of Business Administration from the University of Maryland, Baltimore County in 2020. Palacios is married to Blake Zerboni, the twin sister of professional soccer player McCall Zerboni. Blake is also from San Clemente and played college soccer at UCLA.

== Career statistics ==
Appearances and goals by club, season and competition
Club	Season	League			Cup (Note: Appearances in the U.S. Open Cup)		Other		Total	
Club	Season	Division	Apps	Goals	Apps	Goals	Apps	Goals	Apps	Goals
Orange County Blue Star	2012	PDL	8	1	—		—		8	1
Ventura County Fusion	2013	PDL	14	2	2	0	1 (Note: Appearance(s) in the PDL playoffs)	0	17	2
Ventura County Fusion	2014	PDL	5	0	1	0	2	0	8	0
Ventura County Fusion	Total		19	2	3	0	3	0	25	2
Portland Timbers 2	2016	USL	2	0	—		—		2	0
Career total			29	3	3	0	3	0	35	3

== Honors ==
Ventura County Fusion

- PDL Western Conference – Southwest Division: 2014

United States military

- Armed Forces Sports Men's Soccer Championship: 2019

== See also ==
- All-time Portland Timbers 2 roster
- List of Cal Poly San Luis Obispo people
