= Dylan Damraoui =

Belgian footballer

Personal information
- Date of birth: 4 May 1997 (age 29)
- Place of birth: Brussels, Belgium
- Height: 1.77 m (5 ft 10 in)
- Position: Midfielder

Youth career
- Club Brugge

Senior career*
Years	Team	Apps	(Gls)
2016–2017	Portland Timbers 2	20	(1)
2017–2018	Hapoel Acre	20	(0)
2019–2021	La Louvière Centre	8	(0)

International career
2013	Belgium U16	4	(0)
2013–2014	Belgium U17	9	(4)
2014–2015	Belgium U18	4	(0)
2015	Belgium U19	1	(0)
- * Club domestic league appearances and goals as of 12 February 2022

Dylan Damraoui (born 4 May 1997) is a Belgian footballer who plays as a midfielder.

== Career ==
Damraoui joined United Soccer League side Portland Timbers 2 on February 22, 2016.

On 31 January 2019, Damraoui joined La Louvière Centre. He left the club in 2021.
