= Alexis Meva =

Cameroonian footballer

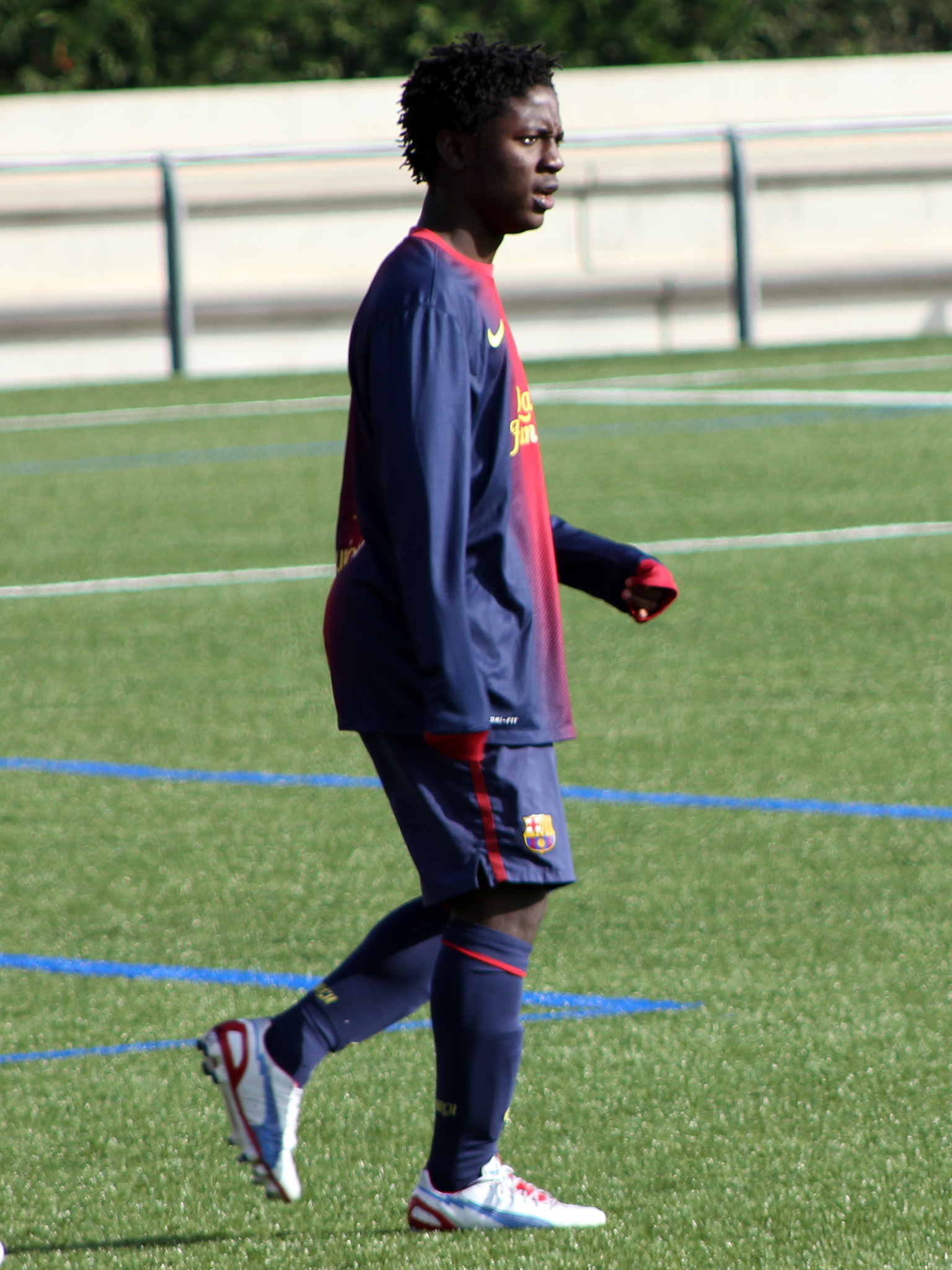
- Image of Alexis Meva

Personal information
- Full name: Alexis Yves Meva
- Date of birth: 16 September 1997 (age 29)
- Place of birth: Douala, Cameroon
- Height: 1.73 m (5 ft 8 in)
- Position: Winger

Team information
- Current team: La Chaux-de-Fonds
- Number: 10

Youth career
- Samuel Eto'o Academy
- 2008–2016: Barcelona
- 2014–2015: → Badalona (loan)

Senior career*
Years	Team	Apps	(Gls)
2016	Portland Timbers 2	3	(0)
2018–	La Chaux-de-Fonds	2	(0)
- * Club domestic league appearances and goals as of 10 June 2017

Alexis Meva (born 16 September 1997) is a Cameroonian footballer who currently plays for Pobla Mafumet as a winger.

== Career ==
Meva joined United Soccer League side Portland Timbers 2 on February 22, 2016.
