= Marco Farfan =

American soccer player (born 1998)

Personal information
- Full name: Marco Antonio Farfan
- Date of birth: November 12, 1998 (age 28)
- Place of birth: Gresham, Oregon, United States
- Height: 5 ft 10 in (1.78 m)
- Position: Left-back

Team information
- Current team: Tigres UANL
- Number: 3

Youth career
- 2013–2016: Portland Timbers

Senior career*
Years	Team	Apps	(Gls)
2016–2020	Portland Timbers 2	56	(1)
2017–2020	Portland Timbers	35	(0)
2021	Los Angeles FC	29	(0)
2021	→ Las Vegas Lights (loan)	1	(0)
2022–2025	FC Dallas	111	(3)
2025–	Tigres UANL	19	(2)

International career^{‡}
2016–2017	United States U19	2	(0)
2019	United States U23	2	(0)
2020	United States	1	(0)
- * Club domestic league appearances and goals as of November 20, 2026 ‡ National team caps and goals as of December 9, 2020

Marco Antonio Farfan (born November 12, 1998) is an American professional soccer player who plays as a left-back for Liga MX club Tigres UANL. In 2017, he was named in the USL 20 Under 20, highlighting the league's 20 best players under 20 years old.

== Career ==
Farfan joined Portland Timbers academy in 2013 and later signed with the club's United Soccer League affiliate Portland Timbers 2 (T2) at the beginning of their 2016 season.

After one season in USL and while still in high school, Farfan moved to the Portland Timbers first team for the 2017 season. On March 12, 2017, he became the first true homegrown and youngest player (at 18 years, 120 days) to start for the Portland Timbers. That season, he played in six MLS games (five starts) and started one U.S. Open Cup game and earned an MLS Team of the Week honor in April. In 2018, he was loaned to T2, an arrangement that allowed him to play for both that team and the first team.

On December 13, 2020, Farfan was traded to Los Angeles FC for $300,000 in general allocation money.

On February 10, 2022, Farfan was traded to FC Dallas for Dallas defender Ryan Hollingshead.

On August 6, 2025, Farfan joined Mexican club Tigres UANL.

== Personal life ==
Farfan was born in Gresham, Oregon, and is of Mexican descent. His brother Roberto Farfan played soccer for Oregon State University and the Timbers U23 team.

== Career statistics ==
=== Club ===
As of November 20, 2026

Appearances and goals by club, season and competition
Club	Season	League			National cup		Continental		Other		Total	
Club	Season	Division	Apps	Goals	Apps	Goals	Apps	Goals	Apps	Goals	Apps	Goals
Portland Timbers 2	2016	USL	18	0	—		—		—		18	0
Portland Timbers 2	2017	USL	9	0	—		—		—		9	0
Portland Timbers 2	2018	USL	12	1	—		—		—		12	1
Portland Timbers 2	2019	USL	17	0	—		—		—		17	0
Portland Timbers 2	Total		56	1	—		—		—		56	1
Portland Timbers	2017	MLS	6	0	1	0	—		—		7	0
Portland Timbers	2018	MLS	11	0	—		—		—		11	0
Portland Timbers	2019	MLS	3	0	1	0	—		—		4	0
Portland Timbers	2020	MLS	15	0	—		—		—		15	0
Portland Timbers	Total		35	0	2	0	—		—		37	0
Los Angeles FC	2021	MLS	29	0	—		—		—		29	0
Las Vegas Lights (loan)	2021	USL	1	0	—		—		—		1	0
FC Dallas	2022	MLS	34	1	—		—		—		34	1
FC Dallas	2023	MLS	34	1	1	0	—		3 (Note: Appearances in Leagues Cup)	0	38	1
FC Dallas	2024	MLS	26	1	3	0	—		2	0	31	1
FC Dallas	2025	MLS	17	0	1	0	—		—		18	0
FC Dallas	Total		111	3	5	0	—		5	0	121	3
Tigres UANL	2025–26	Liga MX	19	2	—		1 (Note: Appearances in CONCACAF Champions Cup)	0	—		20	2
Career total			251	6	7	0	1	0	5	0	264	6

=== International ===
As of match played on December 9, 2020

Appearances and goals by national team and year
National team	Year	Apps	Goals
United States	2020	1	0
Total		1	0

== Honors ==
Portland Timbers

- MLS is Back Tournament: 2020
