= Akinjide Idowu =

Nigerian footballer

Personal information
- Full name: Akinjide Elijah Idowu
- Date of birth: 9 September 1996 (age 30)
- Place of birth: Kano State, Nigeria
- Height: 1.71 m (5 ft 7 1/2 in)
- Position: Defensive midfielder

Team information
- Current team: Asswehly SC
- Number: 3

Youth career
- Nath Boys Academy

Senior career*
Years	Team	Apps	(Gls)
2016	Portland Timbers 2	1	(0)
2016	Speranța Nisporeni	9	(0)
2018	Palanga	8	(0)
2019–2020	Atlantas Klaipėda	26	(0)
2020–2023	Asswehly SC	27	(01)

International career
2012–2013	Nigeria U17	6	(0)
2013–2016	Nigeria U20	45	(0)
- * Club domestic league appearances and goals as of 9 November 2019

Akinjide Elijah Idowu (born 9 September 1996) is a Nigerian footballer.

== Career ==
Idowu joined United Soccer League side Portland Timbers 2 on 22 January 2016.

In 2018 was a member of lithuanian FK Palanga.

In 2019 he changed team and became a member of FK Atlantas Klaipėda.
