= Gbenga Arokoyo =

Nigerian footballer (born 1992)

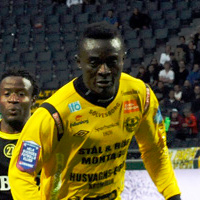

Personal information
- Date of birth: 1 November 1992 (age 33)
- Place of birth: Kabba, Nigeria
- Height: 1.89 m (6 ft 2 1/2 in)
- Position: Defender

Team information
- Current team: Umeå FC
- Number: 5

Youth career
- Davish Athletic FC
- Kwara Football Academy

Senior career*
Years	Team	Apps	(Gls)
2010–2012	Kwara United		
2012–2014	Mjällby AIF	48	(1)
2014–2016	Gaziantepspor	35	(1)
2016–2017	Portland Timbers	1	(0)
2016	→ Portland Timbers 2 (loan)	1	(0)
2018–2020	Kalmar FF	11	(1)
2021–	Umeå FC	21	(1)

International career
- Nigeria U20
2016–	Nigeria	2	(0)
- * Club domestic league appearances and goals as of 3 April 2022

Gbenga Arokoyo(born 1 November 1992) is a Nigerian footballer who played for Swedish club Umeå FC as a defender.

== Career ==
Arokoyo was signed by Kwara United from Kwara Football Academy in 2010. During his time at the club he was selected for the Nigeria national under-20 football team. In early 2012 a delegation from Swedish club Mjällby AIF travelled to see him on location in Nigeria and in February they officially signed him. In April 2013 an Allsvenskan game against Djurgårdens IF was suspended after Arokoyo got hit by a pear thrown by a Djurgården supporter.

On 2 August 2016, Portland Timbers of Major League Soccer announced that they had signed Arokoyo. He played in one game for the Timbers and one game for their second team, Portland Timbers 2, in 2016. During training before the 2017 season, he suffered an Achilles tendon tear, missing the subsequent season.

On 13 December 2017, Arokoyo was traded along with Darlington Nagbe to Atlanta United FC.

On 15 February 2021, Arokoyo signed with Umeå FC in the Swedish third-tier Ettan.

On March 8, 2024 Arokoyo announced his retirement via Instagram.

== Personal life ==
In his youth Arokoyo wanted to become a doctor but since his family could not afford to pay for the education he instead chose to become a professional footballer.
