= Merlo Field =

Soccer-specific stadium in Portland, Oregon

Coordinates: 45°34′28″N 122°43′38″W

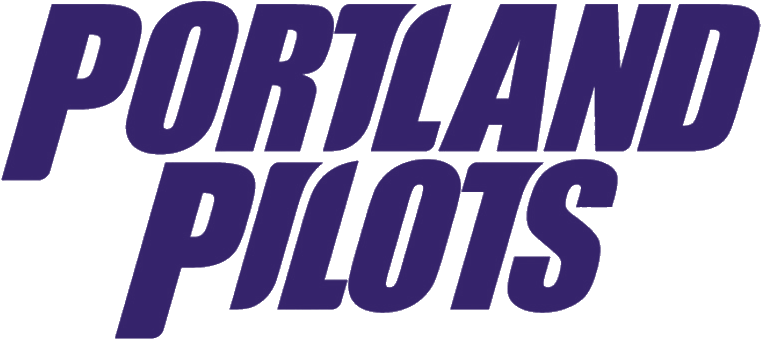

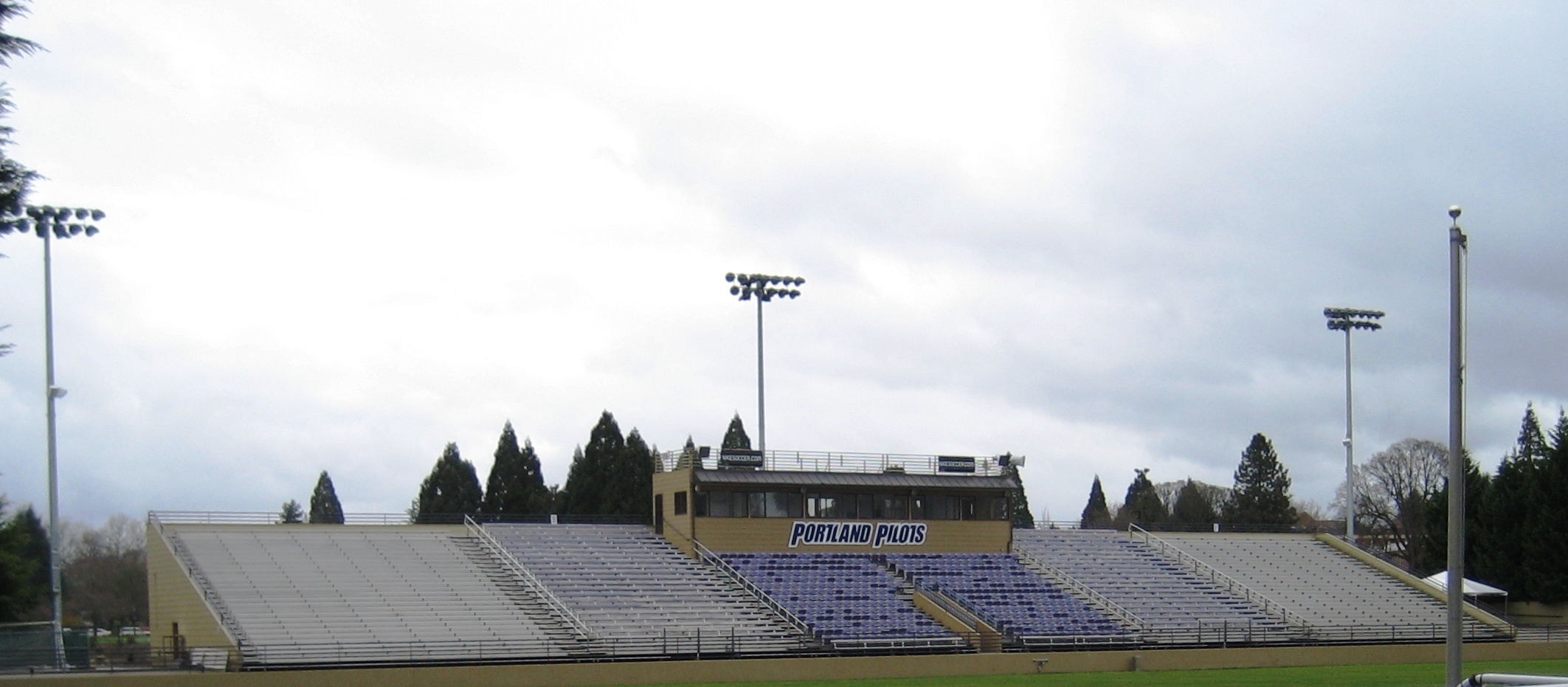
- Interior view of the stadium in 2009
- Interactive map of Merlo Field
- Full name: Harry A. Merlo Field
- Address: Portland, OR; United States
- Owner: University of Portland
- Operator: Univ. of Portland Athletics
- Capacity: 4,892
- Type: Soccer-specific stadium
- Surface: Grass
- Field size: 109 m × 69 m 120 yds × 75 yds

Construction
- Built: 1990
- Opened: 1990; 36 years ago
- Cost: $1.2 Million

Tenants
- Portland Pilots (NCAA) teams: men's and women's soccer

Website
- portlandpilots.com/merlo-field

Harry A. Merlo Field at the Clive Charles Soccer Complex is a 4,892-capacity soccer-specific stadium in Portland, Oregon on the campus of the University of Portland where it serves as home to the school's men's and women's soccer teams.

From March 29, 2015, until the end of 2016, the stadium played host to the Portland Timbers' USL side Portland Timbers 2.

== History ==
The stadium was constructed in 1990. It is named after Harry A. Merlo, a businessman and philanthropist. Merlo Field hosted a quarter-final game in the 2001 Women's NCAA Division I Championship and then first and second-round games of the tournament in 2003. In 2004, the school added six light standards to illuminate the field to allow for night games at the venue. Pilots’ alumna Tiffeny Milbrett scored her 100th international goal at Merlo in a game for the United States women's national soccer team against Ukraine in July 2005.

In 2005, the Lady Pilots hosted an NCAA tournament semifinal game on their way to a national title. During the 2007 season the Pilots averaged 3,652 people per game in attendance at the 4,892 seat stadium for the women's home matches, leading the country in average attendance for the third straight year. In March 2008, the Portland Timbers used the facility to host an exhibition match against Major League Soccer’s San Jose Earthquakes. on July 17, 2010, the Portland Timbers held an exhibition match against English Premier league power and Europa League qualifier Manchester City at this facility.

The Portland Timbers used Merlo Field as their home pitch during the 2010 USSF D-2 playoffs.

Due to the renovation of Jeld-Wen Field, in their first home match as a MLS team, the Timbers used Merlo Field as their home pitch in their US Open Cup match against Chivas USA, winning 2–0.

== See also ==
- List of sports venues in Portland, Oregon

Preceded by Fetzer Field	Host of the Women's College Cup; 1994	Succeeded by Fetzer Field
