= Wade Hamilton =

American soccer player

Personal information
- Full name: Wade Nelson Hamilton
- Date of birth: September 15, 1994 (age 32)
- Place of birth: Redlands, California, United States
- Height: 1.88 m (6 ft 2 in)
- Position: Goalkeeper

College career
Years	Team	Apps	(Gls)
2012–2015	Cal Poly Mustangs	73	(0)

Senior career*
Years	Team	Apps	(Gls)
2014	Lane United		
2016	Portland Timbers	0	(0)
2016	→ Portland Timbers 2 (loan)	11	(0)
2017	Portland Timbers 2	11	(0)
2018	LA Galaxy II	7	(0)

International career
2010	United States U17	3	(0)
- * Club domestic league appearances and goals as of 15 July 2019

Wade Nelson Hamilton (born September 15, 1994) is an American soccer goalkeeper who last played for LA Galaxy II in the United Soccer League.

== Career ==
=== College and amateur ===
Hamilton spent his entire college career at Cal Poly University between 2012 and 2015. In 2015, he was named Big West Goalkeeper of the Year and First Team All-Big West Conference.

He also played in the Premier Development League for Lane United FC.

=== Professional ===
On January 19, 2016, Hamilton was selected in the third round (61st overall) of the 2016 MLS SuperDraft by Portland Timbers.
