= Santiago Biglieri =

Argentine football striker

Personal information
- Full name: Santiago Biglieri
- Date of birth: February 11, 1986 (age 40)
- Place of birth: Posadas, Argentina
- Height: 1.74 m (5 ft 8 1/2 in)
- Position: Striker

Team information
- Current team: CA Colón

Youth career
- Lanús

Senior career*
Years	Team	Apps	(Gls)
2003–2012	Lanús	99	(12)
2010	→ Emelec (loan)	34	(5)
2011–2012	→ Rosario Central (loan)	29	(5)
2012–2013	Instituto	19	(0)
2013–2014	Sud América	17	(2)
2015	Portland Timbers 2	11	(0)
2016–	Colón	1	(0)
- * Club domestic league appearances and goals as of 22 August 2017

Santiago Biglieri (born 11 February 1986 in Posadas, Misiones) is an Argentine football who plays as a striker for CA Colón. His nickname "Saviolita" refers to his physical similarity with Javier Saviola.

In 2007, he was part of the Lanús squad that won the Apertura 2007 tournament, the club's first ever top flight league title.

He was transferred in January 2010 on a one-year loan with an option to buy to Emelec of Ecuador.

== Titles ==
Season	Team	Title
Apertura 2007	Lanús	Primera División Argentina
