= Rennico Clarke =

Jamaican footballer (born 1995)

Personal information
- Date of birth: 26 August 1995 (age 31)
- Place of birth: Kingston, Jamaica
- Height: 1.94 m (6 ft 4 in)
- Position: Defender

Youth career
- Harbour View

Senior career*
Years	Team	Apps	(Gls)
2014–2015	Harbour View	7	(1)
2015–2016	Portland Timbers 2	29	(2)
2017	Portland Timbers	0	(0)
2017	→ Portland Timbers 2 (loan)	17	(0)
2018	FH	9	(0)
2019	Harbour View	8	(2)
2019	Swope Park Rangers	8	(0)
2020	Charleston Battery	4	(0)

International career
2014–2015	Jamaica U20	6	(0)
- * Club domestic league appearances and goals as of February 5, 2023

Rennico Clarke (born 26 August 1995) is a Jamaican footballer who last played for Charleston Battery in the USL Championship.

== Career ==
=== Professional ===
Clarke began his professional career with Harbour View. He made seven appearances and scored one goal for the club before joining USL expansion side Portland Timbers 2 on 19 February 2015. He made his debut for the club on 29 March 2015 in a 3–1 victory over Real Monarchs SLC.

Clarke was released by Portland on 9 February 2018.

In April 2018 Clarke joined the Iceland team FH.

In July 2019, Clarke signed with USL Championship club Swope Park Rangers.

In February 2020, Clarke joined Charleston Battery.

=== International ===
Clarke represented Jamaica at the 2015 CONCACAF U-20 Championship.
