= Terrell Lowe =

American soccer player

Personal information
- Date of birth: May 12, 1998 (age 28)
- Place of birth: Cedar City, Utah, United States
- Height: 1.73 m (5 ft 8 in)
- Position: Midfielder

Team information
- Current team: PDX FC

Youth career
- 2010–2012: Pocatello Idaho
- 2012–2013: Real Salt Lake AZ
- 2013–2015: Portland Timbers

College career
Years	Team	Apps	(Gls)
2016	Virginia Cavaliers	20	(0)

Senior career*
Years	Team	Apps	(Gls)
2015–2016	Portland Timbers 2	11	(0)
2017–2018	Portland Timbers 2	15	(0)
2019–	PDX FC	0	(0)

International career^{‡}
2016	United States U19	3	(0)
- * Club domestic league appearances and goals as of October 15, 2018 ‡ National team caps and goals as of February 18, 2016

Terrell Lowe (born May 12, 1998) is an American soccer player for PDX FC in the National Premier Soccer League.

== Career ==
Terrell Lowe spent his youth years playing for PVSC Galaxy in Pocatello, Idaho. The team had success winning 2 State Titles, That team also consisted of his two older (twin) brothers, Tevin and Trent. In 2012 Terrell moved to Arizona to train/play with Real Salt Lake's academy.

After spending time with Real Salt Lake's academy in Arizona, Lowe moved to Portland Timbers academy. While at the academy, Lowe appeared for Portland Timbers 2, coming on as an 84th-minute substitute during a 3–1 victory over Vancouver Whitecaps FC 2 on August 17, 2015.

Lowe left Portland to play college soccer at the University of Virginia in 2016, where he made twenty appearances. On May 11, 2017, Lowe returned to Portland Timbers 2.
