= Andy Thoma =

American soccer defender (born 1993)

Personal information
- Full name: Andrew Thomas Thoma
- Date of birth: April 29, 1993 (age 33)
- Place of birth: Los Alamos, New Mexico, United States
- Height: 1.80 m (5 ft 11 in)
- Positions: Defender; midfielder

Youth career
- Classic FC Gladiators

College career
Years	Team	Apps	(Gls)
2011–2014	Washington Huskies		

Senior career*
Years	Team	Apps	(Gls)
2012–2014	Washington Crossfire	25	(2)
2015–2016	Portland Timbers	0	(0)
2015–2016	→ Portland Timbers 2 (loan)	42	(0)
2017–2018	Whitecaps FC 2	16	(1)
- * Club domestic league appearances and goals

Andrew Thomas Thoma (born April 29, 1993) is an American retired soccer player who primarily played as a defender.

== Career ==
=== College and amateur ===
Thoma spent his entire college career at the University of Washington. He made a total of 80 appearances for the Huskies and tallied one goal and seven assists.

He also played in the Premier Development League for Washington Crossfire.

=== Professional ===
On January 15, 2015, Thoma was selected in the second round (24th overall) of the 2015 MLS SuperDraft by the Portland Timbers. On March 29, he made his debut for USL affiliate club Portland Timbers 2 against Real Monarchs. On December 16, 2015, he was re-signed by Timbers.

Following his release from Portland, Thoma signed with USL side Whitecaps FC 2 on March 3, 2017. Thoma retired following his release from Whitecaps FC 2 on November 21, 2018. Thoma now works as the Soccer Program Coordinator for King's way Christian School in Vancouver, Washington.

== Honors ==
=== Club ===
Portland Timbers

- MLS Cup: 2015
- Western Conference (playoffs): 2015
