= 2013 Portland Timbers season =

Portland Timbers
2013 season
- President: Merritt Paulson
- Head coach: Caleb Porter
- Stadium: Jeld-Wen Field; Portland, Oregon (Capacity: 20,674)
- Major League Soccer: Conference: 1st Overall: 3rd
- MLS Cup Playoffs: Conference finals
- U.S. Open Cup: Semifinals
- Cascadia Cup: 3rd
- Top goalscorer: League: Diego Valeri(10 goals); All: Diego Valeri(12 goals)
- Highest home attendance: Preseason: 14,968; Regular Season: 20,674; Open Cup: 10,924; Friendlies:18,553
- Lowest home attendance: Preseason: 10,724; Regular Season: 20,674; Open Cup: 5,931; Friendlies:13,124
- Average home league attendance: Preseason: 13,307; Regular Season: 20,674; Open Cup: 8,427; Friendlies:15,839
Primary colors	Secondary colors	Third colors

The 2013 Portland Timbers season was the 3rd season for the Portland Timbers in Major League Soccer (MLS), the top flight professional soccer league in the United States and Canada.

== Background ==
Caleb Porter was announced as the Timbers head coach on August 29, 2012, but finished out coaching his final year at the University of Akron. He was introduced as the head coach on January 8, 2013.

== Competitions ==
Competition	Started round	Final position / round	First match	Last match
Major League Soccer	—	3rd	March 3, 2013	October 26, 2013
MLS Cup Playoffs	Conference semifinals	Conference finals	November 2, 2013	November 24, 2013
U.S. Open Cup	Third round	Semifinals	May 28, 2013	August 7, 2013
Cascadia Cup	—	3rd	March 16, 2013	October 13, 2013

Updated to match played October 27, 2013
Source: Competitions

=== Major League Soccer ===
==== Preseason ====
Desert Friendlies

January 29, 2013	Portland Timbers	3–1	Colorado Rapids	Tucson, Arizona, U.S.
11:00 (PST)	Valeri 26'; Alhassan 63'; Valencia 79'	Report	88' Brown	Stadium: Kino Veterans Memorial Stadium

February 1, 2013	Portland Timbers	0–1	Sporting Kansas City	Tucson, Arizona, U.S.
18:00 (PST)		Report	64' Jérôme	Stadium: Kino Veterans Memorial Stadium

February 5, 2013	Portland Timbers	1–0	Seattle Sounders FC	Tucson, Arizona, U.S.
10:00 (PST)	Silvestre 66'	Report		Stadium: Kino Veterans Memorial Stadium

February 8, 2013	Portland Timbers	3–0	FC Tucson	Tucson, Arizona, U.S.
10:00 (PST)	Mosquera 3'; Rincón 31'; Evans 86'	Report		Stadium: Kino Veterans Memorial Stadium

Portland Timbers Tournament

Pos	Team	Pld	W	D	L	GF	GA	GD	Pts
1	San Jose Earthquakes	3	1	2	0	5	4	+1	5
2	FC Dallas	3	1	1	1	2	2	0	4
3	AIK	3	0	3	0	1	1	0	3
4	Portland Timbers	3	0	2	1	4	5	−1	2

February 17, 2013	Portland Timbers	3–3	San Jose Earthquakes	Portland, Oregon, U.S.
17:00 (PST)	Johnson 5', 27', 52'	Report	3' Wondolowski; 39' Bernardez; 60' Fucito	Stadium: Jeld-Wen Field; Attendance: 14,229

February 20, 2013	Portland Timbers	0–1	FC Dallas	Portland, Oregon, U.S.
19:30 (PST)		Report	16' Pérez	Stadium: Jeld-Wen Field; Attendance: 10,724

February 23, 2013	Portland Timbers	1–1	AIK	Portland, Oregon, U.S.
17:00 (PST)	76' Harrington	Report	28' Goitom	Stadium: Jeld-Wen Field; Attendance: 14,968; Referee: (USA)

==== Regular season ====
March 3, 2013 MLS 1	Portland Timbers	3–3	New York Red Bulls	Portland, Oregon, U.S.
16:30(PDT)	Valeri 14'; Nagbe 56'; Olave 83' (o.g.)	Report	Espíndola 9', 24'; Olave 28'	Stadium: Jeld-Wen Field; Attendance: 20,674; Referee: Jair Marrufo

March 9, 2013 MLS 2	Portland Timbers	1–2	Montreal Impact	Portland, Oregon, U.S.
19:30(PDT)	R. Johnson 80'	Report	Camara 30'; Martins 60'	Stadium: Jeld-Wen Field; Attendance: 20,674; Referee: Edvin Jurisevic

March 16, 2013 MLS 3	Seattle Sounders FC	1–1	Portland Timbers	Seattle, U.S.
17:00(PDT)	Johnson 13'	Report	90+1' Wallace	Stadium: CenturyLink Field; Attendance: 40,150; Referee: Kevin Scott

March 30, 2013 MLS 4	Colorado Rapids	2–2	Portland Timbers	Commerce City, Colorado, U.S.
15:00(PDT)	Powers 18'; Thomas 48' (pen.)	Report	W. Johnson	Stadium: Dick's Sporting Goods Park; Attendance: 11,774; Referee: Drew Fischer

April 6, 2013 MLS 5	Portland Timbers	2–0	Houston Dynamo	Portland, Oregon, U.S.
19:30(PDT)	R. Johnson 55', 73'	Report		Stadium: Jeld-Wen Field; Attendance: 20,674; Referee: Ricardo Salazar

April 14, 2013 MLS 6	Portland Timbers	1–0	San Jose Earthquakes	Portland, Oregon, U.S.
19:30(PDT)	W. Johnson 78'	Report		Stadium: Jeld-Wen Field; Attendance: 20,674; Referee: Hilario Grajeda

April 21, 2013 MLS 7	San Jose Earthquakes	1–1	Portland Timbers	Santa Clara, California, U.S.
20:00(PDT)	Janh 90+2'	Report	Valeri 58'	Stadium: Buck Shaw Stadium; Attendance: 10,525; Referee: Armando Villarreal

April 27, 2013 MLS 8	Sporting Kansas City	2–3	Portland Timbers	Kansas City, Kansas
17:30(PDT)	Myers 1', 29'	Report	R. Johnson 24'; Nagbe 33'; Wallace 58'	Stadium: Sporting Park; Attendance: 20,186; Referee: Hilario Grajeda

May 2, 2013 MLS 9	Portland Timbers	0–0	New England Revolution	Portland, Oregon, U.S.
19:30(PDT)		Report		Stadium: Jeld-Wen Field; Attendance: 20,674; Referee: Jair Marrufo

May 8, 2013 MLS 10	FC Dallas	1–1	Portland Timbers	Frisco, Texas, U.S.
18:00(PDT)	Cooper 77' (pen.)	Report	Nagbe 70'	Stadium: FC Dallas Stadium; Attendance: 10,112; Referee: Juan Guzman

May 12, 2013 MLS 11	Portland Timbers	3–0	Chivas USA	Portland, Oregon, U.S.
14:00(PDT)	Wallce 34'; Valeri 70'; W. Johnson 90+2'	Report		Stadium: Jeld-Wen Field; Attendance: 20,674; Referee: Silviu Petrescu

May 18, 2013 MLS 12	Vancouver Whitecaps FC	2–2	Portland Timbers	Vancouver, British Columbia, Canada
16:00(PDT)	Sanvezzo 24'; Koffie 54'	Report	W. Johnson 52' (pen.); Valencia 84'	Stadium: BC Place; Attendance: 19,823; Referee: Matthew Foerster

May 25, 2013 MLS 13	D.C. United	0–2	Portland Timbers	Washington, D.C.
16:00(PDT)		Report	Wallace 21'; Nagbe 57'	Stadium: RFK Stadium; Attendance: 14,131; Referee: Jose Carlos Rivera

June 8, 2013 MLS 14	Chicago Fire	2–2	Portland Timbers	Bridgeview, Illinois
17:30(PDT)	Magee 68'; Paladini 82'	Report	Valeri 33'; Zemanski 58'	Stadium: Toyota Park; Attendance: 15,349; Referee: Jorge González (referee)

June 15, 2013 MLS 15	Portland Timbers	1–0	FC Dallas	Portland, Oregon, U.S.
14:00(PDT)	Nagbe 52'	Report		Stadium: Jeld-Wen Field; Attendance: 20,674; Referee: Armando Villarreal

June 19, 2013 MLS 16	Los Angeles Galaxy	0–0	Portland Timbers	Carson, California, U.S.
19:30(PDT)		Report		Stadium: StubHub Center; Attendance: 23,675; Referee: Allen Chapman

June 23, 2013 MLS 17	Portland Timbers	3–0	Colorado Rapids	Portland, Oregon, U.S.
16:00(PDT)	Piquionne 12'; W. Johnson 45'; R. Johnson 84'	Report		Stadium: Jeld-Wen Field; Attendance: 20,674; Referee: Silviu Petrescu

July 7, 2013 MLS 18	Columbus Crew	1–0	Portland Timbers	Columbus, Ohio
14:00(PDT)	Anor 5'	Report		Stadium: Crew Stadium; Attendance: 15,051; Referee: Jorge González

July 13, 2013 MLS 19	Portland Timbers	2–1	Los Angeles Galaxy	Portland, Oregon, U.S.
20:00(PDT)	R. Johnson 28'; Jean-Baptiste 90+4'	Report	Sarvas 18'	Stadium: Jeld-Wen Field; Attendance: 20,674; Referee: Baldomero Toledo

July 20, 2013 MLS 20	Philadelphia Union	0–0	Portland Timbers	Chester, Pennsylvania
16:30(PDT)		Report		Stadium: PPL Park; Attendance: 18,740; Referee: Ricardo Salazar

July 27, 2013 MLS 21	San Jose Earthquakes	2–1	Portland Timbers	Santa Clara, California, U.S.
19:30(PDT)	Bernárdez 55' (pen.); Lenhart 58'	Report	Nagbe 83'	Stadium: Buck Shaw Stadium; Attendance: 10,525; Referee: Drew Fischer

August 3, 2013 MLS 22	Portland Timbers	1–1	Vancouver Whitecaps FC	Portland, Oregon, U.S.
20:00(PDT)	R. Johnson 49'	Report	Harvey 69'	Stadium: Jeld-Wen Field; Attendance: 20,674; Referee: Silviu Petrescu

August 17, 2013 MLS 23	Portland Timbers	2–1	FC Dallas	Portland, Oregon, U.S.
20:00(PDT)	R. Johnson 26'; Nagbe 33'	Report	Díaz 28'	Stadium: Jeld-Wen Field; Attendance: 20,674; Referee: Allen Chapman

August 21, 2013 MLS 24	Portland Timbers	3–3	Real Salt Lake	Portland, Oregon, U.S.
20:00(PDT)	Wallace 24'; Valeri 57' (pen.); Alhassan 86'	Report	Borchers 38'; Morales 43' (pen.); Grossman 90+3'	Stadium: Jeld-Wen Field; Attendance: 20,674; Referee: Ricardo Salazar

August 25, 2013 MLS 25	Seattle Sounders FC	1–0	Portland Timbers	Seattle
19:00(PDT)	Johnson 60'	Report		Stadium: CenturyLink Field; Attendance: 67,385; Referee: Jair Marrufo

August 30, 2013 MLS 26	Real Salt Lake	4–2	Portland Timbers	Sandy, Utah, U.S.
19:00(PDT)	Gil 9'; Plata 15'; Morales 55'; Saborío 67'	Report	Nagbe 31'; Zizzo 78'	Stadium: Rio Tinto Stadium; Attendance: 20,252; Referee: Baldomero Toledo

September 7, 2013 MLS 27	Portland Timbers	4–0	Toronto FC	Portland, Oregon, U.S.
20:00(PDT)	Alhassan 45+1'; Wallace 83'; W. Johnson 87'; Diego Valeri 90+3'	Report		Stadium: Jeld-Wen Field; Attendance: 20,674; Referee: Armando Villarreal

September 14, 2013 MLS 28	Chivas USA	1–1	Portland Timbers	Carson, California, U.S.
19:30(PDT)	de la Fuente 23'	Report	Valeri 50'	Stadium: StubHub Center; Attendance: 5,123; Referee: Matthew Foerster

September 20, 2013 MLS 29	Portland Timbers	1–0	Colorado Rapids	Portland, Oregon, U.S.
19:00(PDT)	Valeri 13'	Report		Stadium: Jeld-Wen Field; Attendance: 20,674; Referee: Hilario Grajeda

September 29, 2013 MLS 30	Portland Timbers	1–0	Los Angeles Galaxy	Portland, Oregon, U.S.
12:30(PDT)	Urruti 52'	Report		Stadium: Jeld-Wen Field; Attendance: 20,674; Referee: Ismail Elfath

October 6, 2013 MLS 31	Vancouver Whitecaps FC	2–2	Portland Timbers	Vancouver, British Columbia, Canada
TBD(PDT)	Sanvezzo 76', 78'	Report	Nagbe 41'; W. Johnson 77'	Stadium: BC Place; Attendance: 20,303; Referee: Silviu Petrescu

October 13, 2013 MLS 32	Portland Timbers	1–0	Seattle Sounders FC	Portland, Oregon, U.S.
18:00(PDT)	Alhassan 45'	Report	Alonso (red card)	Stadium: Jeld-Wen Field; Attendance: 20,674; Referee: Hilario Grajeda

October 19, 2013 MLS 33	Portland Timbers	0–0	Real Salt Lake	Portland, Oregon, U.S.
19:30(PDT)		Report		Stadium: Jeld-Wen Field; Attendance: 20,674; Referee: Kevin Stott

October 26, 2013 MLS 34	Chivas USA	0–5	Portland Timbers	Carson, California, U.S.
19:30(PDT)		Report	Diego Valeri 16', 29'; Wallace 34'; R. Johnson 72'; W. Johnson 76'	Stadium: StubHub Center; Attendance: 11,024; Referee: Drew Fischer

==== MLS Cup Playoffs ====
November 2, 2013 Conference semifinals	Seattle Sounders FC	1–2	Portland Timbers	Seattle, Washington, U.S.
19:00 PST	Alonso 90'	Report	R. Johnson 15'; Nagbe 67'	Stadium: CenturyLink Field; Attendance: 38,507; Referee: Baldomero Toledo

November 7, 2013 Conference semifinals	Portland Timbers	3–2	Seattle Sounders FC	Portland, Oregon, U.S.
20:00 PST	W. Johnson 29' (pen.); Valeri 44'; Danso 47'	Report	Yedlin 74'; Johnson 76'	Stadium: Jeld-Wen Field; Attendance: 20,674; Referee: Hilario Grajeda

November 10, 2013 Conference finals	Real Salt Lake	4–2	Portland Timbers	Sandy, Utah
18:00 PST	Schuler 35'; Findley 41'; Sandoval 48'; Morales 82'	Report	W. Johnson 14'; Piqionne 90+4'	Stadium: Rio Tinto Stadium; Attendance: 17,333; Referee: Armando Villarreal

November 24, 2013 Conference finals	Portland Timbers	0–1	Real Salt Lake	Portland, Oregon, U.S.
18:00 PST		Report	Findley 29'	Stadium: Jeld-Wen Field; Attendance: 20,674; Referee: Mark Geiger

Knockout round
E4	Houston Dynamo	3
E5	Montreal Impact	0
W4	Seattle Sounders FC	2
W5	Colorado Rapids	0

Conference semifinals
E1	New York Red Bulls	2	1	3
E4	Houston Dynamo (a.e.t.)	2	2	4
Eastern Conference
E2	Sporting Kansas City (a.e.t.)	1	3	4
E3	New England Revolution	2	1	3
W1	Portland Timbers	2	3	5
W4	Seattle Sounders FC	1	2	3
Western Conference
W2	Real Salt Lake (a.e.t.)	0	2	2
W3	Los Angeles Galaxy	1	0	1

Conference finals
E4	Houston Dynamo	0	1	1
E2	Sporting Kansas City	0	2	2
W1	Portland Timbers	2	0	2
W2	Real Salt Lake	4	1	5

MLS Cup
E2	Sporting Kansas City (p)	1 (7)
W2	Real Salt Lake	1 (6)

==== Western Conference standings ====
Pos	Team	Pld	W	L	T	GF	GA	GD	Pts	Qualification
1	Portland Timbers	34	14	5	15	54	33	+21	57	Qualification for the conference semifinals
2	Real Salt Lake	34	16	10	8	57	41	+16	56	Qualification for the conference semifinals
3	LA Galaxy	34	15	11	8	53	38	+15	53	Qualification for the conference semifinals
4	Seattle Sounders FC	34	15	12	7	42	42	0	52	Qualification for the knockout round
5	Colorado Rapids	34	14	11	9	45	38	+7	51	Qualification for the knockout round
6	San Jose Earthquakes	34	14	11	9	35	42	−7	51	
7	Vancouver Whitecaps FC	34	13	12	9	53	45	+8	48	
8	FC Dallas	34	11	12	11	48	52	−4	44	
9	Chivas USA	34	6	20	8	30	67	−37	26	

Source: MLS

Updated to matches played on September 25, 2013 01:00 EDT
Source: gue Soccer (MLS), the top flight MLSSoccer.com
(W1) = Western Conference champion; (WC) = Qualifies for playoffs via wild-card.
Only applicable when the season is not finished:
(Q) = Qualified for the MLS Cup Playoffs, but not yet to the particular round indicated; (E) = Eliminated from playoff contention.

==== Overall standings ====
Pos	Team	Pld	W	L	T	GF	GA	GD	Pts	
1	New York Red Bulls (S)	34	17	9	8	58	41	+17	59	Qualification for the CONCACAF Champions League
2	Sporting Kansas City (C)	34	17	10	7	47	30	+17	58	Qualification for the CONCACAF Champions League
3	Portland Timbers	34	14	5	15	54	33	+21	57	Qualification for the CONCACAF Champions League
4	Real Salt Lake	34	16	10	8	57	41	+16	56	
5	LA Galaxy	34	15	11	8	53	38	+15	53	
6	Seattle Sounders FC	34	15	12	7	42	42	0	52	
7	New England Revolution	34	14	11	9	49	38	+11	51	
8	Colorado Rapids	34	14	11	9	45	38	+7	51	
9	Houston Dynamo	34	14	11	9	41	41	0	51	
10	San Jose Earthquakes	34	14	11	9	35	42	−7	51	
11	Montreal Impact (V)	34	14	13	7	50	49	+1	49	Qualification for the CONCACAF Champions League
12	Chicago Fire	34	14	13	7	47	52	−5	49	
13	Vancouver Whitecaps FC	34	13	12	9	53	45	+8	48	
14	Philadelphia Union	34	12	12	10	42	44	−2	46	
15	FC Dallas	34	11	12	11	48	52	−4	44	
16	Columbus Crew	34	12	17	5	42	46	−4	41	
17	Toronto FC	34	6	17	11	30	47	−17	29	
18	Chivas USA	34	6	20	8	30	67	−37	26	
19	D.C. United (U)	34	3	24	7	22	59	−37	16	Qualification for the CONCACAF Champions League

Source: MLS
Rules for classification: 1) points; 2) head-to-head record; 3) goal difference; 4) number of goals scored
(C) MLS Cup champions; (S) Supporters' Shield winners; (U) U.S. Open Cup winners; (V) Canadian Championship winners

==== Results summary ====
Overall								Home						Away					
Pld	Pts	W	L	T	GF	GA	GD	W	L	T	GF	GA	GD	W	L	T	GF	GA	GD
34	57	14	5	15	54	33	+21	11	1	5	29	11	+18	3	4	10	25	22	+3

Last updated: October 27, 2013
Source: Portland Timbers
Pld = Matches played; Pts = Points; W = Matches won; T = Matches tied; L = Matches lost; GF = Goals for; GA = Goals against; GD = Goal difference

==== Results by round ====
Round	1	2	3	4	5	6	7	8	9	10	11	12	13	14	15	16	17	18	19	20	21	22	23	24	25	26	27	28	29	30	31	32	33	34
Stadium	H	H	A	A	H	H	A	A	H	A	H	A	A	A	H	A	H	A	H	A	A	H	H	H	A	A	H	A	H	H	A	H	H	A
Result	T	L	T	T	W	W	T	W	T	T	W	T	W	T	W	T	W	L	W	T	L	T	W	T	L	L	W	T	W	W	T	W	T	W

Updated to match(es) played on October 27, 2013. Source: Portland Timbers
A = Away; H = Home; W = Win; L = Loss; T = Tie

=== U.S. Open Cup ===
==== Cup bracket ====
3rd Round
MLS	Portland Timbers	5
USLP	Wilmington Hammerheads	1
NASL	Tampa Bay Rowdies	1
MLS	Seattle Sounders FC	0
NASL	Fort Lauderdale Strikers	0
MLS	FC Dallas	2
MLS	Houston Dynamo	2
PDL	FC Tucson	0
MLS	Real Salt Lake	3
NASL	Atlanta Silverbacks	2
USLP	Charleston Battery	1
MLS	San Jose Earthquakes	0
NASL	Carolina RailHawks	2
MLS	Los Angeles Galaxy	0
MLS	Chivas USA	2
USLP	Los Angeles Blues	1

4th Round
MLS	Portland Timbers	2
NASL	Tampa Bay Rowdies	0
MLS	FC Dallas	3
MLS	Houston Dynamo	0
MLS	Real Salt Lake	5 a.e.t.
USLP	Charleston Battery	2
NASL	Carolina RailHawks	3 a.e.t
MLS	Chivas USA	1

Quarterfinals
MLS	Portland Timbers	3
MLS	FC Dallas	2
MLS	Real Salt Lake	3
NASL	Carolina RailHawks	0

Semifinals
MLS	Portland Timbers	1
MLS	Real Salt Lake	2

May 29, 2013 Third Round	Portland Timbers	5–1	Wilmington Hammerheads	Portland, Oregon
19:30PDT	Piquionne 2', 17', 34', 45+2'; Danso 73'	Report	Nicholson 61'	Stadium: Jeld-Wen Field; Attendance: 10,924; Referee: Alejandro Mariscal

June 12, 2013 Fourth Round	Portland Timbers	2–0	Tampa Bay Rowdies	Portland, Oregon
19:30PDT	Nanchoff 9'; Jewsbury 55'	Report		Stadium: Jeld-Wen Field; Attendance: 5,931; Referee: Ismail Elfath

June 26, 2013 Quarterfinals	FC Dallas	2–3	Portland Timbers	Frisco, Texas
18:00PDT	Watson 14'; Pérez 86'	Report	Nagbe 61'; Valeri 63'; Piquionne 72'	Stadium: FC Dallas Stadium; Attendance: 3,889; Referee: Jose Carlos Rivero

August 7, 2013 Semifinals	Real Salt Lake	2–1	Portland Timbers	Sandy, Utah
16:30 PDT	Saborío 7'; Plata 78'	Report	Valeri 90'	Stadium: Rio Tinto Stadium; Attendance: 14,742; Referee: Mark Geiger

=== Cascadia Cup ===
The Cascadia Cup is a trophy that was created in 2004 by supporters of the Portland Timbers, Seattle Sounders FC and Vancouver Whitecaps FC. It is awarded to the club with the best record in league games versus the other participants.

2013
Team	Pld	W	L	D	GF	GA	GD	Pts
Vancouver Whitecaps FC	6	2	1	3	13	9	+4	9
Portland Timbers	6	1	1	4	7	7	0	7
Seattle Sounders FC	6	2	3	1	6	10	−4	7

Source: "Cascadia Cup". cascadiacup.soccer. January 2013.

=== Friendlies ===
July 3, 2013 Copa Verde	Portland Timbers	1–0	(Mexico) Monarcas Morelia	Portland, Oregon
20:00 (PDT)	Danso 40' (pen.)	Report		Stadium: Jeld-Wen Field; Attendance: 13,124; Referee: Ramon Hernandez

July 24, 2013	Portland Timbers	1–0	(England) Norwich City F.C.	Portland, Oregon
20:00 (PDT)	Valencia 53'	Report		Stadium: Jeld-Wen Field; Attendance: 18,553; Referee: Younes Marrakchi

=== 2013 MLS Reserve League ===
Pos	Club	Pld	W	L	T	GF	GA	GD	Pts	PPG
1	LA Galaxy Reserves (C)	10	5	1	4	16	9	+7	19	1.90
2	Vancouver Whitecaps Reserves	10	4	2	4	21	15	+6	16	1.60
3	Real Salt Lake Reserves	14	6	4	4	14	13	+1	22	1.57
4	Chivas USA Reserves	12	5	6	1	23	24	-1	16	1.33
5	San Jose Earthquakes Reserves	10	4	5	1	18	12	+6	13	1.30
6	Colorado Rapids Reserves	14	5	7	2	16	20	-4	17	1.21
7	Seattle Sounders FC Reserves	12	4	6	2	17	21	-4	14	1.17
8	Portland Timbers Reserves	14	4	7	3	16	23	-7	15	1.07

==== Reserve League schedule ====
March 17, 2013	Seattle Sounders Reserves	0–1	Portland Timbers Reserves	Tukwila, Washington
17:00 (PST)		Report	Valencia 86'	Stadium: Starfire Sports Complex

March 31, 2013	Colorado Rapids Reserves	1–0	Portland Timbers Reserves	Commerce City, Colorado
13:00(PST)	Mwanga 49'	Report		Stadium: Dick's Sporting Goods Park Field 20

April 7, 2013	Portland Timbers	2–1	VSI Tampa Bay FC	Portland, Oregon
14:00(PST)	Nanchoff 53' (pen.); Valencia 81'	Report	Salles 59'	Stadium: Jeld-Wen Field; Attendance: 1,803

April 15, 2013	Portland Timbers	2–1	San Jose Earthquakes Reserves	Portland, Oregon
19:00(PST)	Nanchoff 14', 50'	Report	Martínez 24'	Stadium: Jeld-Wen Field; Attendance: 1,243

April 24, 2013	Portland Pilots	2–3	Portland Timbers	Portland, Oregon
19:00(PST)	Escobar 12'; Velasco 21'	Report	Kawulok 9'; Zizzo 29'; Valencia 58'	Stadium: Merlo Field

May 19, 2013	Vancouver Whitecaps Reserves	1–1	Portland Timbers	Vancouver, CAN
11:00(PST)	Zizzo 82'		Heinemann 26'	Stadium: Thunderbird Stadium

June 1, 2013	VSI Tampa Bay FC	4–4	Portland Timbers	Tampa, Florida
16:30(PST)	Budnyi 2', 12'; Chin 18'; Dos Santos 45'	Report	Nanchoff 5'; Rincón 47'; Valencia 56'; Zizzo 68' (pen.)	Stadium: Corbett Soccer Stadium

July 14, 2013	Portland Timbers	0–1	Los Angeles Galaxy Reserves	Portland, Oregon
18:00(PST)		Recap	Villarreal 11'	Stadium: Jeld-Wen Field

July 28, 2013	San Jose Earthquakes Reserves	0–1	Portland Timbers	San Jose, California
11:00(PST)		Report	Valencia 56'	Stadium: Nutrilite Training Facility

August 4, 2013	Portland Timbers	2–3	Vancouver Whitecaps Reserves	Portland, Oregon
18:00(PST)	Valencia 52' (pen.); McKenzie 81'	Report	Heinemann 53', 86' (pen.); Hurtado 86'	Stadium: Jeld-Wen Field

August 31, 2013	Real Salt Lake Reserves	1–0	Portland Timbers	Sandy, Utah
09:00(PST)	Sandoval 38'	Report		Stadium: America First Field

September 8, 2013	Portland Timbers	1–1	Real Salt Lake Reserves	Portland, Oregon
18:00(PST)	Macchione 87'	Report	Sandoval 53'	Stadium: Jeld-Wen Field

September 15, 2013	Chivas USA Reserves	4–1	Portland Timbers	Portland, Oregon
11:00(PST)	Bowen 37', 48'; Villafaña 73', 82'		R. Johnson 55'	Stadium: Jeld-Wen Field; Referee: Robert Sarfaraz

September 21, 2013	Portland Timbers	0–1	Colorado Rapids Reserves	Portland, Oregon
18:00(PST)		Report	Wallace 60'	Stadium: Jeld-Wen Field

October 14, 2013	Portland Timbers	1–4	Seattle Sounders Reserves	Portland, Oregon
14:00(PST)	Rincón 54'	Report	Estrada 7'; Azira 34'; Rose 70'; Crook 82'	Stadium: Jeld-Wen Field; Attendance: 3,209

== Club ==
=== Kits ===
Primary	Secondary	Secondary Alt.	Third

Type	Shirt	Shorts	Socks	First appearance / Info
Primary	Green / White	White	Green	
Secondary	White / Red	White	White	
Secondary Alt.	White / Red	Red	White	MLS, March 16 against Seattle
Third	White	White	White	

=== Executive staff ===
Majority Owner & President	Merritt Paulson
Chief Operating Officer	Mike Golub
General Manager / Technical Director	Gavin Wilkinson
Ground (capacity and dimensions)	Jeld-Wen Field (20,438 / 110x70 yards)

Updated to match played January 23, 2012
Source: Portland Timbers

=== Coaching staff ===
Position	Staff
Head Coach	Caleb Porter
Assistant Coach	Pablo Moreira
Assistant Coach	Amos Magee
Assistant Coach	Sean McAuley
Assistant Coach	Cameron Knowles
Goalkeeping Coach	Mike Toshack
Director of Sport Science	John Cone Ph.D.
Head Athletic Trainer	Nik Wald
Assistant Athletic Trainer	Jun Morishita

Last updated: January 26, 2012
Source: Portland Timbers

== Squad ==
=== Roster and statistics ===
All players contracted to the club during the season included.

As of October 27, 2013

No.	Pos.	Nat.	Player	Total App	Total	Total (yellow card)	Total (red card)	MLS App.	MLS	MLS (yellow card)	MLS (red card)	Open Cup App.	Open Cup	Open Cup (yellow card)	Open Cup (red card)
1	GK	(Jamaica)	Donovan Ricketts	34	0	2	0	32	0	2	0	2	0	0	0
2	DF	(United States)	Ryan Miller	11	0	0	0	7	0	0	0	2	0	0	0
4	MF	(Canada)	Will Johnson	31	9	5	0	27	9	4	0	3	0	1	0
5	DF	(United States)	Michael Harrington	35	0	2	0	33	0	2	0	2	0	0	0
6	FW	(Liberia)	Darlington Nagbe	38	10	1	0	34	9	1	0	4	1	0	0
7	MF	(United States)	Sal Zizzo	12	1	0	0	10	1	0	0	2	0	0	0
8	MF	(Argentina)	Diego Valeri	34	12	2	0	31	10	2	0	3	2	0	0
9	FW	(Jamaica)	Ryan Johnson	31	9	3	0	29	9	2	0	2	0	1	0
10	FW	(Martinique)	Frédéric Piquionne	24	6	0	0	21	1	0	0	3	5	0	0
11	MF	(Ghana)	Kalif Alhassan	33	3	2	0	30	3	2	0	3	0	0	0
12	DF	(United States)	David Horst	2	0	0	0	2	0	0	0	0	0	0	0
13	MF	(United States)	Jack Jewsbury	28	1	0	0	26	0	0	0	2	1	0	0
14	MF	(United States)	Ben Zemanski	28	1	4	1	25	1	4	1	3	0	0	0
15	MF	(United States)	Steven Evans	1	0	0	0	0	0	0	0	1	0	0	0
16	FW	(United States)	Brent Richards	0	0	0	0	0	0	0	0	0	0	0	0
17	MF	(United States)	Michael Nanchoff	2	1	0	0	1	0	0	0	1	1	0	0
18	MF	(United States)	Brad Ring	1	0	0	0	1	0	0	0	0	0	0	0
19	FW	(Nigeria)	Bright Dike	0	0	0	0	0	0	0	0	0	0	0	0
20	FW	(Colombia)	José Adolfo Valencia	24	1	1	0	21	1	1	0	3	0	0	0
21	MF	(Colombia)	Diego Chará	33	0	8	0	31	0	8	0	2	0	0	0
22	MF	(Costa Rica)	Rodney Wallace	29	7	3	0	27	7	3	0	2	0	0	0
23	DF	(Jamaica)	Alvas Powell	6	0	1	0	5	0	1	0	1	0	0	0
23	DF	(United States)	Mobi Fehr	0	0	0	0	0	0	0	0	0	0	0	0
24	FW	(Colombia)	Sebastián Rincón	1	0	0	0	0	0	0	0	1	0	0	0
25	DF	(United States)	Dylan Tucker-Gangnes	0	0	0	0	0	0	0	0	0	0	0	0
27	DF	(France)	Mikaël Silvestre	8	0	2	0	8	0	2	0	0	0	0	0
30	GK	(Serbia)	Miloš Kocić	4	0	0	0	2	0	0	0	2	0	0	0
31	DF	(United States)	Rauwshan McKenzie	3	0	0	0	1	0	0	0	2	0	0	0
33	DF	(Colombia)	Hanyer Mosquera	0	0	0	0	0	0	0	0	0	0	0	0
35	DF	(United States)	Andrew Jean-Baptiste	30	1	4	0	26	1	4	0	4	0	0	0
37	FW	(Argentina)	Maximiliano Urruti	5	1	1	0	5	1	1	0	0	0	0	0
44	DF	(Norway)	Pa Modou Kah	22	0	9	1	20	0	7	1	2	0	2	0
90	GK	(New Zealand)	Jake Gleeson	0	0	0	0	0	0	0	0	0	0	0	0
98	MF	(The Gambia)	Mamadou Danso	18	1	2	1	16	0	2	1	2	1	0	0
			Own goals for	0	1	0	0	0	0	0	0	0	0	0	0

=== Goalkeeper stats ===
Last updated: October 27, 2013

No.	Nat	Player	Total				Major League Soccer				U.S. Open Cup			
No.	Nat	Player	MIN	GA	GAA	SV	MIN	GA	GAA	SV	MIN	GA	GAA	SV
1	(Jamaica)	Donovan Ricketts	3060	35	1.02	102	2880	31	0.96	91	180	4	2	9
30	(Serbia)	Miloš Kocić	360	3	0.75	15	180	2	1	7	180	1	0.5	8
90	(New Zealand)	Jake Gleeson	0	0	—	0	0	0	—	0	0	0	—	0
		TOTALS	3420	38	1.00	117	2880	33	1.03	98	360	5	1.25	17

=== Player recognition ===
MLS Coach of the Year

Result	Coach	Ref
Won	(United States) Caleb Porter	

MLS Goalkeeper of the Year

Result	Player	Ref
Won	(Jamaica) Donovan Ricketts	

MLS Newcomer of the Year

Result	Player	Ref
Won	(Argentina) Diego Valeri	

2013 MLS Best XI

Result	Position	Player	Ref
Won	MF	(Canada) Will Johnson	
Won	GK	(Jamaica) Donovan Ricketts	
Won	MF	(Argentina) Diego Valeri	

MLS Xbox Individual Fair Play Award

Result	Player	Ref
Won	(Liberia) Darlington Nagbe	

2013 MLS All-Star Game

Result	Position	Player	Notes	Ref
Won	MF	(Canada) Will Johnson	Voted in by fan ballot	
Won	GK	(Jamaica) Donovan Ricketts	On Inactive All-Star Roster	
Won	MF	(Argentina) Diego Valeri	On Inactive All-Star Roster	
Won	MF	(Costa Rica) Rodney Wallace	On Inactive All-Star Roster	
Nominated	DF	(United States) Michael Harrington		
Nominated	MF	(Colombia) Diego Chará		
Nominated	FW	(Liberia) Darlington Nagbe		

MLS Player of the Week

Week	Player	Opponent	Ref
5	(Canada) Will Johnson	Colorado Rapids	
6	(Jamaica) Ryan Johnson	Houston Dynamo	

MLS Goal of the Week

Week	Result	Player	Opponent	Ref
1	Won	(Argentina) Diego Valeri	New York Red Bulls	
3	Won	(Costa Rica) Rodney Wallace	Seattle Sounders FC	
6	Won	(Jamaica) Ryan Johnson	Houston Dynamo	
7	Won	(Canada) Will Johnson	San Jose Earthquakes	
11	Nominated	(Canada) Will Johnson	Chivas USA	
13	Won	(Costa Rica) Rodney Wallace	D.C. United	
15	Won	(Argentina) Diego Valeri	Chicago Fire	
15	Nominated	(United States) Ben Zemanski	Chicago Fire	
16	Won	(Liberia) Darlington Nagbe	FC Dallas	
17	Won	(Canada) Will Johnson	Colorado Rapids	
28	Won	(Ghana) Kalif Alhassan	Toronto FC	
30	Won	(Argentina) Diego Valeri	Colorado Rapids	
31	Nominated	(Argentina) Maximiliano Urruti	Los Angeles Galaxy	
32	Nominated	(Liberia) Darlington Nagbe	Vancouver Whitecaps FC	
33	Won	(Ghana) Kalif Alhassan	Seattle Sounders FC	
35	Won	(Argentina) Diego Valeri	Chivas USA	

MLS Goal of the Year

Week	Result	Player	Opponent	Ref
1	Nominated	(Argentina) Diego Valeri	New York Red Bulls	
7	Nominated	(Canada) Will Johnson	San Jose Earthquakes	
13	Nominated	(Costa Rica) Rodney Wallace	D.C. United	
30	Nominated	(Argentina) Diego Valeri	Colorado Rapids	

MLS Save of the Week

Week	Result	Player	Opponent	Ref
2	Won	(Jamaica) Donovan Ricketts	Montreal Impact	
5	Won	(Jamaica) Donovan Ricketts	Colorado Rapids	
8	Won	(Jamaica) Donovan Ricketts	San Jose Earthquakes	
9	Won	(Jamaica) Donovan Ricketts	Sporting Kansas City	
10	Won	(Jamaica) Donovan Ricketts	New England Revolution	
15	Nominated	(Serbia) Miloš Kocić	Chicago Fire	
16	Won	(Jamaica) Donovan Ricketts	FC Dallas	
19	Nominated	(Jamaica) Donovan Ricketts	Columbus Crew	
20	Nominated	(Jamaica) Donovan Ricketts	Los Angeles Galaxy	
21	Nominated	(Jamaica) Donovan Ricketts	Philadelphia Union	
22	Won	(Jamaica) Donovan Ricketts	San Jose Earthquakes	
28	Won	(Ghana) Kalif Alhassan	Toronto FC	
32	Won	(Jamaica) Donovan Ricketts	Vancouver Whitecaps FC	
33	Won	(Jamaica) Donovan Ricketts	Seattle Sounders FC	

MLS Save of the Year

Week	Result	Player	Opponent	Ref
8	Nominated	(Jamaica) Donovan Ricketts	San Jose Earthquakes	
22	Nominated	(Jamaica) Donovan Ricketts	San Jose Earthquakes	

MLS Top 3 Performers

Week	Result	Player	Opponent	Ref
1	Won	(Argentina) Diego Valeri	New York Red Bulls	
5	Won	(Canada) Will Johnson	Colorado Rapids	
7	Won	(Canada) Will Johnson	San Jose Earthquakes	
8	Won	(Jamaica) Ryan Johnson	Sporting Kansas City	
April	Won	(Jamaica) Ryan Johnson	Houston Dynamo; San Jose Earthquakes; Sporting Kansas City	
11	Won	(Argentina) Diego Valeri	Chivas USA	
May	Won	(Costa Rica) Rodney Wallace	New England Revolution; FC Dallas; Chivas USA; Vancouver Whitecaps FC; D.C. United	
17	Won	(Costa Rica) Rodney Wallace	Colorado Rapids	
June	Won	(Jamaica) Donovan Ricketts	FC Dallas; Los Angeles Galaxy; Colorado Rapids	
20	Won	(Jamaica) Donovan Ricketts	Los Angeles Galaxy	
34	Won	(Argentina) Diego Valeri	Chivas USA	

MLS Team of the Week

Week	Result	Player/Coach	Opponent	Ref
1	Won	(Argentina) Diego Valeri	New York Red Bulls	
1	Won	(Liberia) Darlington Nagbe	New York Red Bulls	
3	Honorable Mention	(Costa Rica) Rodney Wallace	Seattle Sounders FC	
5	Won	(Canada) Will Johnson	Colorado Rapids	
6	Won	(Jamaica) Ryan Johnson	Houston Dynamo	
6	Won	(Liberia) Darlington Nagbe	Houston Dynamo	
6	Won	(United States) Caleb Porter	Houston Dynamo	
7	Won	(Canada) Will Johnson	San Jose Earthquakes	
7	Won	(The Gambia) Mamadou Danso	San Jose Earthquakes	
8	Bench	(The Gambia) Mamadou Danso	San Jose Earthquakes	
9	Won	(Jamaica) Ryan Johnson	Sporting Kansas City	
9	Won	(United States) Caleb Porter	Sporting Kansas City	
9	Won	(Costa Rica) Rodney Wallace	Sporting Kansas City	
11	Won	(Costa Rica) Rodney Wallace	Chivas USA	
11	Won	(Argentina) Diego Valeri	Chivas USA	
11	Won	(Colombia) Diego Chará	Chivas USA	
12	Bench	(Colombia) Diego Chará	Vancouver Whitecaps FC	
13	Won	(Costa Rica) Rodney Wallace	D.C. United	
15	Won	(Argentina) Diego Valeri	Chicago Fire	
15	Bench	(Serbia) Miloš Kocić	Chicago Fire	
16	Won	(Colombia) Diego Chará	FC Dallas	
16	Won	(Liberia) Darlington Nagbe	FC Dallas	
16	Bench	(Argentina) Diego Valeri	FC Dallas	
17	Won	(Costa Rica) Rodney Wallace	Colorado Rapids	
17	Won	(Canada) Will Johnson	Colorado Rapids	
17	Won	(Jamaica) Donovan Ricketts	Colorado Rapids	
17	Bench	(United States) Andrew Jean-Baptiste	Colorado Rapids	
20	Won	(United States) Andrew Jean-Baptiste	Los Angeles Galaxy	
20	Won	(Jamaica) Donovan Ricketts	Los Angeles Galaxy	
20	Bench	(Liberia) Darlington Nagbe	Los Angeles Galaxy	
25	Won	(Argentina) Diego Valeri	FC Dallas	
26	Won	(Argentina) Diego Valeri	Real Salt Lake; Seattle Sounders FC	
28	Won	(Canada) Will Johnson	Toronto FC	
30	Won	(Argentina) Diego Valeri	Colorado Rapids	
31	Won	(Colombia) Diego Chará	Los Angeles Galaxy	
31	Bench	(Argentina) Maximiliano Urruti	Los Angeles Galaxy	
33	Won	(Canada) Will Johnson	Seattle Sounders FC	
33	Won	(Liberia) Darlington Nagbe	Seattle Sounders FC	
33	Bench	(Colombia) Diego Chará	Seattle Sounders FC	
35	Won	(Argentina) Diego Valeri	Chivas USA	
35	Won	(The Gambia) Mamadou Danso	Chivas USA	
35	Bench	(Canada) Will Johnson	Chivas USA	

MLS WORKS Humanitarian of the Month

Month	Player/Coach	Ref
May	Portland Timbers team	

Thecup.us U.S. Open Cup Player of the Round

Round	Player	Opponent	Ref
3rd Round	(Martinique) Frédéric Piquionne	Wilmington Hammerheads	

North American Soccer Reporters Player of the Week

Week	Player	Opponent	Ref
6	(Jamaica) Ryan Johnson	Houston Dynamo	

ProSoccer Talk Player of the Week

Week	Player	Opponent	Ref
6	(Colombia) Diego Chará	Houston Dynamo	

=== Player movement ===
==== Transfers in ====
Date	Player	Pos	Previous club	Fee/notes	Ref
December 3, 2012	(United States) Michael Harrington	DF	(United States) Sporting Kansas City	Trade for allocation money	
December 3, 2012	(Canada) Will Johnson	MF	(United States) Real Salt Lake	Trade for allocation money	
December 12, 2012	(Jamaica) Ryan Johnson	FW	(Canada) Toronto FC	Traded with Miloš Kocić for Joe Bendik, Portland's highest first-round pick in the 2013 SuperDraft and allocation money	
December 12, 2012	(Serbia) Miloš Kocić	GK	(Canada) Toronto FC	Traded with Ryan Johnson for Joe Bendik, Portland's highest first-round pick in the 2013 SuperDraft and allocation money	
December 18, 2012	(United States) Mobi Fehr	MF	(Switzerland) FC Basel	Acquired through weighted lottery	
January 8, 2013	(United States) Steven Evans	MF	(United States) University of Portland (United States) Portland Timbers U23's	Signed as Homegrown Player	
January 17, 2013	(United States) Dylan Tucker-Gangnes	DF	(United States) University of Washington (United States) Portland Timbers U23's	Drafted in 2nd round of the SuperDraft. Officially signed February 6, 2013.	
January 21, 2013	(United States) Ryan Miller	DF	(Sweden) Halmstads BK	Transfer signing	
February 13, 2013	(United States) Ben Zemanski	MF	(United States) Chivas USA	Acquired for allocation money and the MLS rights to Jonathan Bornstein	
February 20, 2013	(France) Mikaël Silvestre	DF	(Germany) SV Werder Bremen	Traded 1st round 2014 Supplemental Draft and a conditional 2015 pick to Seattle Sounders FC for Silvestre's rights	
February 21, 2013	(United States) Michael Nanchoff	MF	(Canada) Vancouver Whitecaps FC	Signed after trial	
February 28, 2013	(Martinique) Frédéric Piquionne	FW	(England) West Ham United F.C.	Signed after trial	
May 3, 2013	(Norway) Pa Modou Kah	DF	(Saudi Arabia) Al-Wehda Club	Acquired during transfer window	
May 22, 2013	(United States) Rauwshan McKenzie	DF	(United States) Chivas USA	Free agent, trialled with team	
August 6, 2013	(Argentina) Diego Valeri	MF	(Argentina) Club Atlético Lanús	Signed to multi-year DP contract after being on loan from beginning of season	
September 5, 2013	(United States) Brad Ring	MF	(United States) San Jose Earthquakes	Signed in exchange for lowest 2014 draft pick	
September 9, 2013	(Argentina) Maximiliano Urruti	FW	(Canada) Toronto FC	Traded for Bright Dike, lowest 2015 1st round draft pick, and allocation money	

==== Loans in ====
Date	Player	Pos	Previous club	Fee/notes	Ref
January 10, 2013	(Argentina) Diego Valeri	MF	(Argentina) Club Atlético Lanús	On loan as a DP from the beginning of the season to August, when contract was acquired	
June 28, 2013	(Jamaica) Alvas Powell	DF	(Jamaica) Portmore United F.C.	Acquired on loan for remainder of 2013 season	

==== Loans out ====
Date	Player	Pos	Previous club	Fee/notes	Ref
July 9, 2013	(United States) Michael Nanchoff	MF	(Sweden) Jönköpings Södra IF	On loan until November 27	

==== Transfers out ====
Date	Player	Pos	Destination club	Fee/notes	Ref
November 19, 2012	(United States) Freddie Braun	MF	(United States) Orlando City Soccer Club	Waived ahead of waiver draft	
November 19, 2012	(United States) Charles Renken	MF	N/A	Waived ahead of waiver draft	
November 19, 2012	(New Zealand) Ian Hogg	DF	(New Zealand) Wellington Phoenix FC	Waived ahead of waiver draft	
December 3, 2012	(Japan) Kosuke Kimura	DF	(United States) New York Red Bulls	Traded for allocation money and the MLS Homegrown rights for defender Bryan Gallego	
December 3, 2012	(United States) Eric Brunner	DF	(United States) Houston Dynamo	Traded for allocation money	
December 3, 2012	(Jamaica) Lovel Palmer	DF	(United States) Real Salt Lake	Contract expired, team option not exercised	
December 3, 2012	(El Salvador) Steve Purdy	DF	(United States) Chivas USA	Contract expired, team option not exercised	
December 6, 2012	(Scotland) Steven Smith	DF	(Scotland) Rangers F.C.	Contract expired, team option not exercised	
December 6, 2012	(United States) Joe Bendik	GK	(Canada) Toronto FC	Traded along with Portland's highest 1st round pick in the 2013 MLS SuperDraft (resulted in 3rd overall pick) and allocation money for Ryan Johnson and Miloš Kocić	
January 16, 2013	(United States) Mike Fucito	FW	(United States) San Jose Earthquakes	Traded for 2013 MLS SuperDraft second round draft pick (resulted in 34th overall pick)	
January 31, 2013	(Scotland) Kris Boyd	FW	(Scotland) Kilmarnock F.C.	Contract terminated	
February 11, 2013	(United States) Eric Alexander	MF	(United States) New York Red Bulls	Traded for allocation money	
February 27, 2013	(Cameroon) Franck Songo'o	MF	N/A	Waived	
February 27, 2013	(United States) Chris Taylor	DF	N/A	Waived	
February 28, 2013	(Democratic Republic of the Congo) Danny Mwanga	FW	(United States) Colorado Rapids	Traded for 1st round pick in the 2015 MLS SuperDraft	
May 15, 2013	(Colombia) Hanyer Mosquera	DF	N/A	Mutual agreement to terminate contract	
May 22, 2013	(United States) Ryan Kawulok	DF	N/A	Waived	
June 28, 2013	(United States) Mobi Fehr	DF	N/A	Waived	
September 9, 2013	(United States) Bright Dike	FW	(Canada) Toronto FC	Traded for Maximiliano Urruti and an International Roster spot	

==== Supplemental draft picks ====
Round (overall pick)	Player	Pos	Previous club	Ref
1 (3)	(United States) David Meves	GK	University of Akron	
2 (22)	(United States) Chris Hegngi	MF	Ohio State University	

==== Unsigned trialists ====
Player	Pos	Previous club	Notes
(England) Calum Angus	DF	(Sweden) GAIS	Preseason
(Belize) Deon McCaulay	FW	(Belize) R.G. City Boys United	Preseason
(Jamaica) Andre Clennon	FW	(Jamaica) Waterhouse F.C.	Preseason
(United States) Kyle Altman	DF	(United States) Minnesota Stars FC	Preseason
(Denmark) Anders Vest Hansen	MF	Fairleigh Dickinson University	March
(Japan) Kazuya Murata	MF	(Japan) Cerezo Osaka	March
(Ghana) Ema Boateng	MF	UC Santa Barbara	March
(El Salvador) Dustin Corea	MF	(Denmark) Skive IK	May
(United States) Steve Neumann	MF	Georgetown University	June
(France) Olivier Thomert	MF	(France) Le Mans FC	July

=== Miscellaneous ===
==== International roster slots ====
Portland Timbers international slots
Slot	Player	Nationality
1	Kalif Alhassan	Ghana
2	Pa Modou Kah	Norway
3	Miloš Kocić	Serbia
4	Frédéric Piquionne	Martinique
5	Mikaël Silvestre	France
6	Maximiliano Urruti	Argentina
7	José Adolfo Valencia	Colombia
8	Diego Valeri	Argentina

Foreign-born players with domestic status
Player	Nationality
Diego Chará	Colombia
Mamadou Danso	The Gambia
Jake Gleeson	New Zealand
Ryan Johnson	Jamaica
Will Johnson	Canada / (United States) / (England)
Darlington Nagbe	Liberia
Donovan Ricketts	Jamaica
Sebastián Rincón	Colombia
Rodney Wallace	Costa Rica
