= 2013 Major League Soccer season =

18th season of Major League Soccer

Major League Soccer
- Season: 2013
- Teams: 19
- MLS Cup: Sporting Kansas City (2nd title)
- Supporters' Shield: New York Red Bulls (1st shield)
- Champions League (U.S.): Sporting Kansas City; New York Red Bulls; Portland Timbers
- Matches: 323
- Goals: 845 (2.62 per match)
- Top goalscorer: Camilo (22 goals)
- Biggest home win: NE 5–0 LA (Jun 2); MTL 5-0 HOU (Aug 24); LA 5-0 CHV (Oct 6)
- Biggest away win: CHV 0–5 POR (Oct 26)
- Highest scoring: 8 goals: MTL 5-3 PHI (May 25)
- Longest winning run: 5 matches: Seattle Sounders FC (Aug 25 – Sep 13)
- Longest unbeaten run: 15 matches: Portland Timbers (Mar 16 – Jun 23)
- Longest winless run: 13 matches: D.C. United (Mar 16 – Jun 22)
- Longest losing run: 7 matches: D.C. United (Mar 23 – May 11); Chivas USA (May 5 – Jun 24)
- Highest attendance: 67,385; POR @ SEA (Aug 25)
- Lowest attendance: 5,123; POR @ CHV (Sep 14)
- Average attendance: 18,594

Locations of teams for the 2013 Major League Soccer season
Western Conference Eastern Conference

The 2013 Major League Soccer season was the 18th season of Major League Soccer. It was also the 101st season of FIFA-sanctioned soccer in the United States, and the 35th with a national first-division league.

The regular season began on March 2 and concluded on October 27. The New York Red Bulls won their first ever Supporters' Shield. The MLS Cup Playoffs began on October 31 and ended on December 7, when Sporting Kansas City won MLS Cup in a penalty shootout over Real Salt Lake. It was the third MLS Cup to be decided on penalties.

== Teams, stadiums, and personnel ==
=== Stadiums and locations ===
Chicago Fire	Chivas USA/ Los Angeles Galaxy	Colorado Rapids	Columbus Crew	D.C. United	FC Dallas
Toyota Park	StubHub Center	Dick's Sporting Goods Park	Crew Stadium	RFK Memorial Stadium	Toyota Stadium
Capacity: 20,000	Capacity: 27,000	Capacity: 18,086	Capacity: 20,145	Capacity: 19,467†	Capacity: 21,193

Houston Dynamo	Montreal Impact	New England Revolution	New York Red Bulls	Philadelphia Union	Portland Timbers
BBVA Compass Stadium	Saputo Stadium (Note: The Impact's first two home games were played at the Olympic Stadium. The Impact played its first home game at Saputo Stadium on April 14, 2013 against the Columbus Crew.)	Gillette Stadium	Red Bull Arena	PPL Park	Providence Park
Capacity: 22,000	Capacity: 20,341	Capacity: 22,385†	Capacity: 25,189	Capacity: 18,500	Capacity: 20,323

Real Salt Lake	San Jose Earthquakes	Seattle Sounders FC	Sporting Kansas City	Toronto FC	Vancouver Whitecaps FC
Rio Tinto Stadium	Buck Shaw Stadium (Note: Some marquee games held at Stanford Stadium. Most recent game held there was on June 29, 2013 in a derby match against Los Angeles Galaxy.)	CenturyLink Field	Sporting Park	BMO Field	BC Place
Capacity: 20,213	Capacity: 10,525	Capacity: 38,500†	Capacity: 18,467	Capacity: 21,859	Capacity: 21,000†

†Actual capacity is higher; seats rationed for soccer games

=== Personnel and sponsorships ===
Note: Flags indicate national team as has been defined under FIFA eligibility rules. Players and Managers may hold more than one non-FIFA nationality.

Team	Head coach	Captain	Shirt sponsor
Chicago Fire	(United States) Frank Klopas	(United States) Logan Pause	Quaker
Chivas USA	(Mexico) José Luis Real	(United States) Dan Kennedy	Corona
Colorado Rapids	(Colombia) Óscar Pareja	(United States) Drew Moor	—
Columbus Crew	(United States) Brian Bliss	(Argentina) Federico Higuaín	Barbasol
D.C. United	(United States) Ben Olsen	(Canada) Dwayne De Rosario	Volkswagen
FC Dallas	(United States) Schellas Hyndman	(Colombia) David Ferreira	AdvoCare
Houston Dynamo	(United States) Dominic Kinnear	(United States) Brad Davis	—
LA Galaxy	(United States) Bruce Arena	(Republic of Ireland) Robbie Keane	Herbalife
Montreal Impact	(Switzerland) Marco Schällibaum	(United States) Davy Arnaud	Bank of Montreal
New England Revolution	(United States) Jay Heaps	(Portugal) José Gonçalves	UnitedHealthcare
New York Red Bulls	(United States) Mike Petke	(France) Thierry Henry	Red Bull
Philadelphia Union	(United States) John Hackworth	(United States) Brian Carroll	Bimbo
Portland Timbers	(United States) Caleb Porter	(Canada) Will Johnson	Alaska Airlines
Real Salt Lake	(United States) Jason Kreis	(United States) Kyle Beckerman	XanGo
San Jose Earthquakes	(Canada) Mark Watson	(United States) Ramiro Corrales	—
Seattle Sounders FC	(United States) Sigi Schmid	(Argentina) Mauro Rosales	Xbox
Sporting Kansas City	(United States) Peter Vermes	(Denmark) Jimmy Nielsen	Ivy Funds
Toronto FC	(New Zealand) Ryan Nelsen	(Scotland) Steven Caldwell	Bank of Montreal
Vancouver Whitecaps FC	(Scotland) Martin Rennie	(United States) Jay DeMerit	Bell Canada

=== Managerial changes ===
Team	Outgoing manager	Manner of departure	Date of vacancy	Position in table	Incoming manager	Date of appointment
Montreal Impact	(United States) Jesse Marsch	Mutual consent	Nov 3, 2012	Preseason	(Switzerland) Marco Schällibaum	Jan 6, 2013
Chivas USA	(United States) Robin Fraser	Fired	Nov 9, 2012	Preseason	(Mexico) José Luis Sánchez Solá	Dec 12, 2012
New York Red Bulls	(Sweden) Hans Backe	End of contract	Nov 9, 2012	Preseason	(United States) Mike Petke	Jan 24, 2013
Portland Timbers	(New Zealand) Gavin Wilkinson	End of interim period	Nov 26, 2012	Preseason	(United States) Caleb Porter	Nov 26, 2012
Toronto FC	(England) Paul Mariner	Fired	Jan 7, 2013	Preseason	(New Zealand) Ryan Nelsen	Jan 7, 2013
Chivas USA	(Mexico) José Luis Sánchez Solá	Mutual consent	May 30, 2013	16th	(Mexico) José Luis Real	May 30, 2013
San Jose Earthquakes	(Canada) Frank Yallop	Mutual consent	Jun 7, 2013	15th	(Canada) Mark Watson	Jun 7, 2013
Columbus Crew	(Poland) Robert Warzycha	Fired	Sep 2, 2013	16th	(United States) Brian Bliss	Sep 2, 2013
FC Dallas	(United States) Schellas Hyndman	Resigned	Oct 26, 2013	16th / Postseason	Vacancy	Vacancy
Vancouver Whitecaps	(Scotland) Martin Rennie	Fired	Oct 29, 2013	13th / Postseason	Vacancy	Vacancy
Chicago Fire	(United States) Frank Klopas	Resigned	Oct 30, 2013	12th / Postseason	(Canada) Frank Yallop	Oct 31, 2013
Columbus Crew	(United States) Brian Bliss	End of interim period	Nov 6, 2013	16th / Postseason	(United States) Gregg Berhalter	Nov 6, 2013
Chivas USA	(Mexico) José Luis Real	End of interim period	Nov 25, 2013	18th / Postseason	Vacancy	Vacancy

=== Player transfers ===
Major League Soccer employs 12 methods to acquire players. These include: signing players on transfers/free transfers as is done in most of the world; via trades; drafting players through mechanisms such as the MLS SuperDraft, MLS Supplemental Draft, or MLS Re-Entry Draft; rarely used methods which cover extreme hardship and injury replacement; signing players as Designated Players or Homegrown Players; placing a discovery claim on players; waivers; and methods peculiar to MLS such as through allocation or a weighted lottery.

==== Allocation ranking ====
The allocation ranking is the mechanism used to determine which MLS club has first priority to acquire a U.S. National Team player who signs with MLS after playing abroad, or a former MLS player who returns to the League after having gone to a club abroad for a transfer fee. The allocation rankings may also be used in the event two or more clubs file a request for the same player on the same day. The allocations will be ranked in reverse order of finish for the 2012 season, taking playoff performance into account.

Once the club uses its allocation ranking to acquire a player, it drops to the bottom of the list. A ranking can be traded, provided that part of the compensation received in return is another club's ranking. At all times, each club is assigned one ranking. The rankings reset at the end of each MLS League season.

Original ranking	Club	Date allocation used	Player signed	Player nation	Previous club	Club nation	Ref
1	Chivas USA† ‡#	July 1, 2013	Carlos Bocanegra	United States	Rangers	Scotland	
2	Portland Timbers†						
3	Seattle Sounders FC‡						
4	New England Revolution						
5	Philadelphia Union						
6	Colorado Rapids						
7	FC Dallas						
8	Montreal Impact						
9	Columbus Crew						
10	Vancouver Whitecaps FC						
11	Chicago Fire						
12	Real Salt Lake						
13	New York Red Bulls						
14	Sporting Kansas City						
15	San Jose Earthquakes						
16	Toronto FC#						
17	D.C. United	February 20, 2013	Carlos Ruiz	Guatemala	Municipal	Guatemala	
18	Houston Dynamo						
19	Los Angeles Galaxy						

†On December 12, 2012, Portland Timbers acquired the number 2 ranking from Chivas USA in exchange for the number 3 ranking and an international roster spot.

‡On February 19, 2013, Chivas USA traded the No. 3 ranking to Seattle Sounders FC in the Shalrie Joseph trade. It was also reported that Seattle sent the No. 15 allocation ranking to Chivas USA as part of the deal, although Seattle appeared to have owned the No. 16 selection and not the No. 15 selection.

#On July 1, 2013, Chivas USA acquired the number 1 allocation ranking from Toronto FC in exchange for the #16 ranking, a first-round pick in the 2015 MLS SuperDraft, and an international roster spot.

==== Weighted lottery ====
Some players are assigned to MLS teams via a weighted lottery process. A team can only acquire one player per year through a weighted lottery. The players made available through lotteries include: (i) Generation adidas players signed after the MLS SuperDraft; and (ii) Draft eligible players to whom an MLS contract was offered but who failed to sign with the League prior to the SuperDraft.

The team with the worst record over its last 30 regular season games (dating back to previous season if necessary and taking playoff performance into account) will have the greatest probability of winning the lottery. Teams are not required to participate in a lottery. Players are assigned via the lottery system in order to prevent a player from potentially influencing his destination club with a strategic holdout.

Below are the results of 2013 weighted lotteries:

Lottery date	Player	Player nation	Position	Winning club	Other clubs participating	Ref
December 18, 2012	Mobi Fehr	USA	DF	Portland Timbers	Seattle Sounders FC, San Jose Earthquakes	
December 20, 2012	Gale Agbossoumonde	USA	DF	Toronto FC	FC Dallas, Houston Dynamo, Seattle Sounders FC, Los Angeles Galaxy, San Jose Earthquakes	
January 25, 2013	Charles Eloundou	CMR	FW	Colorado Rapids	Real Salt Lake, D.C. United	
July 18, 2013	Conor Doyle	USA	FW	D.C. United	Colorado Rapids	

=== Ownership changes ===
Club	New owner	Previous owner	Date
Real Salt Lake	Dell Loy Hansen	Dave Checketts	January 24, 2013
Columbus Crew	Anthony Precourt	Clark Hunt	July 30, 2013

== Regular season ==
=== Eastern Conference ===
Pos	Team	Pld	W	L	T	GF	GA	GD	Pts	Qualification
1	New York Red Bulls	34	17	9	8	58	41	+17	59	MLS Cup Conference Semifinals
2	Sporting Kansas City	34	17	10	7	47	30	+17	58	MLS Cup Conference Semifinals
3	New England Revolution	34	14	11	9	49	38	+11	51	MLS Cup Conference Semifinals
4	Houston Dynamo	34	14	11	9	41	41	0	51	MLS Cup Knockout Round
5	Montreal Impact	34	14	13	7	50	49	+1	49	MLS Cup Knockout Round
6	Chicago Fire	34	14	13	7	47	52	−5	49	
7	Philadelphia Union	34	12	12	10	42	44	−2	46	
8	Columbus Crew	34	12	17	5	42	46	−4	41	
9	Toronto FC	34	6	17	11	30	47	−17	29	
10	D.C. United	34	3	24	7	22	59	−37	16	

Source: MLS

=== Western Conference ===
Pos	Team	Pld	W	L	T	GF	GA	GD	Pts	Qualification
1	Portland Timbers	34	14	5	15	54	33	+21	57	MLS Cup Conference Semifinals
2	Real Salt Lake	34	16	10	8	57	41	+16	56	MLS Cup Conference Semifinals
3	LA Galaxy	34	15	11	8	53	38	+15	53	MLS Cup Conference Semifinals
4	Seattle Sounders FC	34	15	12	7	42	42	0	52	MLS Cup Knockout Round
5	Colorado Rapids	34	14	11	9	45	38	+7	51	MLS Cup Knockout Round
6	San Jose Earthquakes	34	14	11	9	35	42	−7	51	
7	Vancouver Whitecaps FC	34	13	12	9	53	45	+8	48	
8	FC Dallas	34	11	12	11	48	52	−4	44	
9	Chivas USA	34	6	20	8	30	67	−37	26	

Source: MLS

=== Overall standings ===
Pos	Team	Pld	W	L	T	GF	GA	GD	Pts	Qualification
1	New York Red Bulls (S)	34	17	9	8	58	41	+17	59	CONCACAF Champions League
2	Sporting Kansas City (C)	34	17	10	7	47	30	+17	58	CONCACAF Champions League
3	Portland Timbers	34	14	5	15	54	33	+21	57	CONCACAF Champions League
4	Real Salt Lake	34	16	10	8	57	41	+16	56	
5	LA Galaxy	34	15	11	8	53	38	+15	53	
6	Seattle Sounders FC	34	15	12	7	42	42	0	52	
7	New England Revolution	34	14	11	9	49	38	+11	51	
8	Colorado Rapids	34	14	11	9	45	38	+7	51	
9	Houston Dynamo	34	14	11	9	41	41	0	51	
10	San Jose Earthquakes	34	14	11	9	35	42	−7	51	
11	Montreal Impact	34	14	13	7	50	49	+1	49	CONCACAF Champions League
12	Chicago Fire	34	14	13	7	47	52	−5	49	
13	Vancouver Whitecaps FC	34	13	12	9	53	45	+8	48	
14	Philadelphia Union	34	12	12	10	42	44	−2	46	
15	FC Dallas	34	11	12	11	48	52	−4	44	
16	Columbus Crew	34	12	17	5	42	46	−4	41	
17	Toronto FC	34	6	17	11	30	47	−17	29	
18	Chivas USA	34	6	20	8	30	67	−37	26	
19	D.C. United	34	3	24	7	22	59	−37	16	CONCACAF Champions League

Source: MLS
Rules for classification: 1) points; 2) head-to-head record; 3) goal difference; 4) number of goals scored
(C) MLS Cup Champion; (S) Supporters' Shield

== MLS Cup playoffs ==
=== Bracket ===
Knockout
E4	Houston	3
E5	Montreal	0
W4	Seattle	2
W5	Colorado	0

Conference semifinals
E1	New York	2	1	3
E4	Houston (a.e.t.)	2	2	4
Eastern Conference
E2	Kansas City (a.e.t.)	1	3	4
E3	New England	2	1	3
W1	Portland	2	3	5
W4	Seattle	1	2	3
Western Conference
W2	Salt Lake (a.e.t.)	0	2	2
W3	Los Angeles	1	0	1

Conference finals
E4	Houston	0	1	1
E2	Kansas City	0	2	2
W1	Portland	2	0	2
W2	Salt Lake	4	1	5

MLS Cup
E2	Kansas City (p)	1 (7)
W2	Salt Lake	1 (6)

== Player statistics ==
=== Goals ===
Rank	Player	Club	Goals
1	(Brazil) Camilo Sanvezzo	Vancouver Whitecaps FC	22
2	(United States) Mike Magee	LA Galaxy, Chicago Fire	21
3	(Italy) Marco Di Vaio	Montreal Impact	20
4	(Republic of Ireland) Robbie Keane	LA Galaxy	16
5	(Uruguay) Diego Fagúndez	New England Revolution	13
5	(Ghana) Dominic Oduro	Columbus Crew	13
7	(United States) Jack McInerney	Philadelphia Union	12
7	(Costa Rica) Álvaro Saborío	Real Salt Lake	12
9	(Australia) Tim Cahill	New York Red Bulls	11
9	(Argentina) Federico Higuaín	Columbus Crew	11
9	(Panama) Blas Pérez	FC Dallas	11
9	(United States) Chris Wondolowski	San Jose Earthquakes	11

=== Assists ===
Rank	Player	Club	Assists
1	(Argentina) Diego Valeri	Portland Timbers	13
2	(France) Sébastien Le Toux	Philadelphia Union	12
3	(Republic of Ireland) Robbie Keane	LA Galaxy	11
4	(Argentina) Javier Morales	Real Salt Lake	10
5	(United States) Brad Davis	Houston Dynamo	9
5	(United States) Landon Donovan	LA Galaxy	9
5	(Colombia) David Ferreira	FC Dallas	9
5	(France) Thierry Henry	New York Red Bulls	9
5	(Argentina) Federico Higuaín	Columbus Crew	9
5	(Canada) Russell Teibert	Vancouver Whitecaps FC	9

=== Clean sheets ===
Rank	Player	Club	Clean sheets
1	(Jamaica) Donovan Ricketts	Portland Timbers	14
2	(Denmark) Jimmy Nielsen	Sporting Kansas City	13
3	(United States) Zac MacMath	Philadelphia Union	12
4	(United States) Luis Robles	New York Red Bulls	11
5	(Austria) Michael Gspurning	Seattle Sounders FC	10
6	(United States) Jon Busch	San Jose Earthquakes	9
6	(United States) Tally Hall	Houston Dynamo	9
6	(United States) Nick Rimando	Real Salt Lake	9
6	(United States) Bobby Shuttleworth	New England Revolution	9
10	(United States) Troy Perkins	Montreal Impact	8

== Awards ==
=== Individual awards ===
Award	Player	Club
Most Valuable Player	(United States) Mike Magee	LA Galaxy, Chicago Fire
Defender of the Year	(Portugal) José Gonçalves	New England Revolution
Goalkeeper of the Year	(Jamaica) Donovan Ricketts	Portland Timbers
Coach of the Year	(United States) Caleb Porter	Portland Timbers
Rookie of the Year	(United States) Dillon Powers	Colorado Rapids
Newcomer of the Year	(Argentina) Diego Valeri	Portland Timbers
Comeback Player of the Year	(United States) Kevin Alston	New England Revolution
Golden Boot	(Brazil) Camilo Sanvezzo	Vancouver Whitecaps FC
Fair Play Award	(United States) Darlington Nagbe	Portland Timbers
Humanitarian of the Year	(United States) Matt Reis	New England Revolution
Goal of the Year	(Brazil) Camilo Sanvezzo	Vancouver Whitecaps FC
Save of the Year	(United States) Nick Rimando	Real Salt Lake

=== Best XI ===
Goalkeeper	Defenders	Midfielders	Forwards
(Jamaica) Donovan Ricketts, Portland	(United States) Matt Besler, Sporting KC (Portugal) José Gonçalves, New England (United States) Omar Gonzalez, LA Galaxy	(Australia) Tim Cahill, New York (Canada) Will Johnson, Portland (Argentina) Diego Valeri, Portland (United States) Graham Zusi, Sporting KC	(Italy) Marco Di Vaio, Montreal (Republic of Ireland) Robbie Keane, LA Galaxy (United States) Mike Magee, LA Galaxy/Chicago

=== Monthly awards ===
Week	MLS Player of the Month				MLS WORKS Humanitarian of the Month			
Week	Player	Nat	Club	Link	Player/Club	Nat	Club	Link
March	Mike Magee	(United States)	Los Angeles Galaxy	5G 0A	Jeb Brovsky	USA	Montreal Impact	
April	Jack McInerney	(United States) USA	Philadelphia Union	4G 0A	Calen Carr	(United States) USA	Houston Dynamo	
May	Jack McInerney	(United States) USA	Philadelphia Union	3G 0A	Portland Timbers	(United States) USA	Portland Timbers	
June	Mike Magee	(United States) USA	Chicago Fire	4G 1A	Jon Busch	(United States) USA	San Jose Earthquakes	
July	Camilo	BRA	Vancouver Whitecaps FC	4G 0A	Gonzalo Segares	CRC	Chicago Fire	
August	Robbie Keane	IRE	Los Angeles Galaxy	5G 1A	Lamar Neagle	(United States) USA	Seattle Sounders FC	
September	Dominic Oduro	GHA	Columbus Crew	3G 2A	Matt Lampson	(United States) USA	Columbus Crew	
October	Camilo	(Brazil) BRA	Vancouver Whitecaps FC	6G 1A	Dwayne De Rosario	CAN	D.C. United	

=== Weekly awards ===
Week	MLS Player of the Week			AT&T Goal of the Week			MLS Save of the Week		
Week	Player	Nat	Club	Player	Nat	Club	Player	Nat	Club
Week 1	Mike Magee	USA	Los Angeles Galaxy	Diego Valeri	ARG	Portland Timbers	Bill Hamid	USA	D.C. United
Week 2	Robert Earnshaw	WAL	Toronto FC	Daigo Kobayashi	JPN	Vancouver Whitecaps FC	Donovan Ricketts	JAM	Portland Timbers
Week 3	Bill Hamid	(United States) USA	D.C. United	Rodney Wallace	CRC	Portland Timbers	Troy Perkins	(United States) USA	Montreal Impact
Week 4	Juan Agudelo	(United States) USA	Chivas USA	Chris Wondolowski	USA	San Jose Earthquakes	Nat Borchers	(United States) USA	Real Salt Lake
Week 5	Will Johnson	CAN	Portland Timbers	Thierry Henry	FRA	New York Red Bulls	Donovan Ricketts	(Jamaica) JAM	Portland Timbers
Week 6	Ryan Johnson	JAM	Portland Timbers	Ryan Johnson	JAM	Portland Timbers	Clint Irwin	(United States) USA	Colorado Rapids
Week 7	Brad Davis	(United States) USA	Houston Dynamo	Will Johnson	CAN	Portland Timbers	Nick Rimando	(United States) USA	Real Salt Lake
Week 8	Jack McInerney	(United States) USA	Philadelphia Union	Javier Morales	(Argentina) ARG	Real Salt Lake	Donovan Ricketts	(Jamaica) JAM	Portland Timbers
Week 9	Tim Cahill	AUS	New York Red Bulls	Jonathan Osorio	(Canada) CAN	Toronto FC	Donovan Ricketts	(Jamaica) JAM	Portland Timbers
Week 10	Graham Zusi	(United States) USA	Sporting Kansas City	Luis Gil	(United States) USA	Real Salt Lake	Donovan Ricketts	(Jamaica) JAM	Portland Timbers
Week 11	Will Bruin	(United States) USA	Houston Dynamo	Thierry Henry	(France) FRA	New York Red Bulls	Kofi Sarkodie	(United States) USA	Houston Dynamo
Week 12	Eddie Johnson	(United States) USA	Seattle Sounders FC	Michel	BRA	FC Dallas	Nick Rimando	(United States) USA	Real Salt Lake
Week 13	Marco Di Vaio	ITA	Montreal Impact	Rodney Wallace	(Costa Rica) CRC	Portland Timbers	Raúl Fernández	PER	FC Dallas
Week 14	Diego Fagúndez	URU	New England Revolution	Robbie Findley	(United States) USA	Real Salt Lake	Nick Rimando	(United States) USA	Real Salt Lake
Week 15	Olmes García	COL	Real Salt Lake	Diego Valeri	(Argentina) ARG	Portland Timbers	Nick Rimando	(United States) USA	Real Salt Lake
Week 16	Kenny Miller	SCO	Vancouver Whitecaps FC	Darlington Nagbe	LBR	Portland Timbers	Donovan Ricketts	(Jamaica) JAM	Portland Timbers
Week 17	Camilo	BRA	Vancouver Whitecaps FC	Will Johnson	(Canada) CAN	Portland Timbers	Luis Robles	(United States) USA	New York Red Bulls
Week 18	Alan Gordon	(United States) USA	San Jose Earthquakes	Yordany Álvarez	CUB	Real Salt Lake	Nick Rimando	(United States) USA	Real Salt Lake
Week 19	Brad Knighton	(United States) USA	Vancouver Whitecaps FC	Graham Zusi	(United States) USA	Sporting Kansas City	Raúl Fernández	(Peru) PER	FC Dallas
Week 20	Camilo	(Brazil) BRA	Vancouver Whitecaps FC	Javier Morales	(Argentina) ARG	Real Salt Lake	Jeff Attinella	(United States) USA	Real Salt Lake
Week 21	Chris Rolfe	(United States) USA	Chicago Fire	DeAndre Yedlin	(United States) USA	Seattle Sounders FC	Donovan Ricketts	(Jamaica) JAM	Portland Timbers
Week 22	Álvaro Saborío	CRC	Real Salt Lake	Álvaro Saborío	(Costa Rica) CRC	Real Salt Lake	Donovan Ricketts	(Jamaica) JAM	Portland Timbers
Week 23	Lloyd Sam	ENG	New York Red Bulls	Cam Weaver	(United States) USA	Houston Dynamo	Nick Rimando	(United States) USA	Real Salt Lake
Week 24	Landon Donovan	(United States) USA	Los Angeles Galaxy	Federico Higuaín	(Argentina) ARG	Columbus Crew	Marcus Hahnemann	(United States) USA	Seattle Sounders FC
Week 25	Robbie Keane	IRE	Los Angeles Galaxy	Giles Barnes	ENG	Houston Dynamo	Chris Wingert	(United States) USA	Real Salt Lake
Week 26	Kelyn Rowe	(United States) USA	New England Revolution	Kelyn Rowe	(United States) USA	New England Revolution	Jaime Penedo	PAN	Los Angeles Galaxy
Week 27	Robbie Keane	(Republic of Ireland) IRE	Los Angeles Galaxy	Javier Morales	(Argentina) ARG	Real Salt Lake	Michael Gspurning	AUT	Seattle Sounders FC
Week 28	Marco Di Vaio	(Italy) ITA	Montreal Impact	Kalif Alhassan	GHA	Portland Timbers	Kalif Alhassan	GHA	Portland Timbers
Week 29	Obafemi Martins	NGA	Seattle Sounders FC	Obafemi Martins	NGA	Seattle Sounders FC	Raúl Fernández	(Peru) PER	FC Dallas
Week 30	Steven Lenhart	(United States) USA	San Jose Earthquakes	Diego Valeri	(Argentina) ARG	Portland Timbers	Nick Rimando	(United States) USA	Real Salt Lake
Week 31	Dominic Oduro	GHA	Columbus Crew	Jared Jeffrey	(United States) USA	D.C. United	Jaime Penedo	(Panama) PAN	Los Angeles Galaxy
Week 32	Camilo	(Brazil) BRA	Vancouver Whitecaps FC	Camilo	(Brazil) BRA	Vancouver Whitecaps FC	Donovan Ricketts	(Jamaica) JAM	Portland Timbers
Week 33	Kekuta Manneh	GAM	Vancouver Whitecaps FC	Kalif Alhassan	(Ghana) GHA	Portland Timbers	Donovan Ricketts	(Jamaica) JAM	Portland Timbers
Week 34	Gabriel Torres	PAN	Colorado Rapids	Tim Cahill	AUS	New York Red Bulls	Nick Rimando	(United States) USA	Real Salt Lake
Week 35	Camilo	(Brazil) BRA	Vancouver Whitecaps FC	Diego Valeri	(Argentina) ARG	Portland Timbers	Nick Rimando	(United States) USA	Real Salt Lake

== Average attendance ==
Club	Mean home attendance
Seattle Sounders FC	44,038
Los Angeles Galaxy	22,152
Portland Timbers	20,674
Montreal Impact	20,603
Vancouver Whitecaps FC	20,038
Houston Dynamo	19,923
Sporting Kansas City	19,709
New York Red Bulls	19,461
Real Salt Lake	19,218
Toronto FC	18,131
Philadelphia Union	17,867
Columbus Crew	16,080
Colorado Rapids	15,440
FC Dallas	15,373
Chicago Fire	15,228
New England Revolution	14,844
D.C. United	13,646
San Jose Earthquakes	12,765
Chivas USA	8,366

== Coaches ==
=== Eastern Conference ===
- Chicago Fire: Frank Klopas
- Columbus Crew: Robert Warzycha
- D.C. United: Ben Olsen
- Houston Dynamo: Dominic Kinnear
- Montreal Impact: Marco Schällibaum
- New England Revolution: Jay Heaps
- New York Red Bulls: Mike Petke
- Philadelphia Union: John Hackworth
- Sporting Kansas City: Peter Vermes
- Toronto FC: Ryan Nelsen

=== Western Conference ===
- Chivas USA: José Luis Real
- Colorado Rapids: Óscar Pareja
- FC Dallas: Schellas Hyndman
- Los Angeles Galaxy: Bruce Arena
- Portland Timbers: Caleb Porter
- Real Salt Lake: Jason Kreis
- San Jose Earthquakes: Mark Watson
- Seattle Sounders FC: Sigi Schmid
- Vancouver Whitecaps FC: Martin Rennie
