= MLS Newcomer of the Year Award =

American soccer award

The MLS Newcomer of the Year Award is awarded by Major League Soccer to a player who has professional experience in another league and has an outstanding season in his first season of play in MLS. The award was introduced in 2007; its votes are collected from team staff, players, and members of the media.

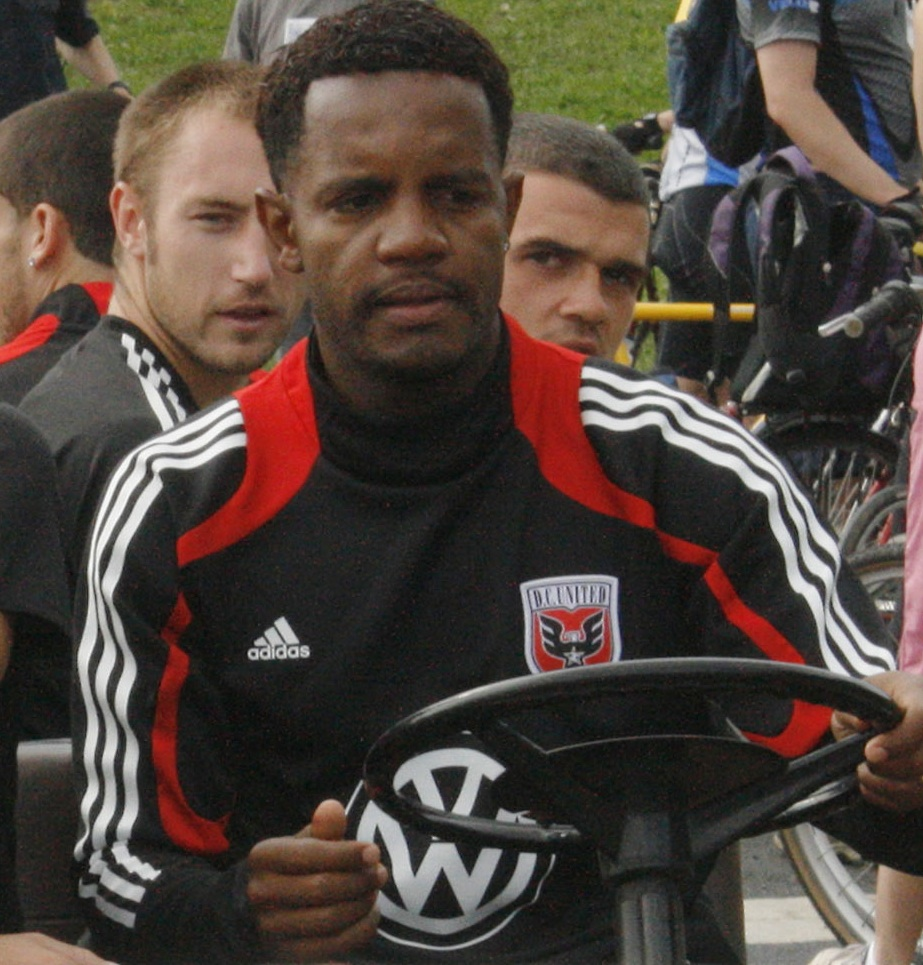
D.C. United's Luciano Emílio won the inaugural award in 2007

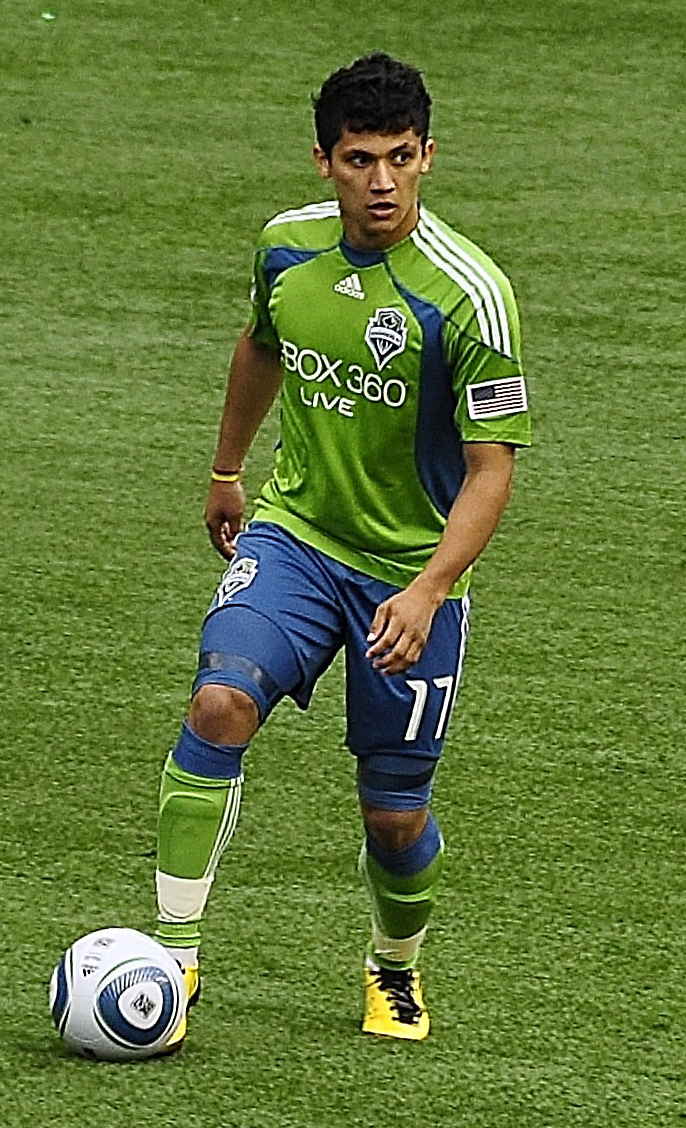
In 2009, the Seattle Sounders' Fredy Montero became the first player to win the award as part of an expansion team.

== Winners ==
Season	Player	Club
2007	(Brazil) Luciano Emílio	D.C. United
2008	(England) Darren Huckerby	San Jose Earthquakes
2009	(Colombia) Fredy Montero	Seattle Sounders FC
2010	(Costa Rica) Álvaro Saborío	Real Salt Lake
2011	(Argentina) Mauro Rosales	Seattle Sounders FC
2012	(Argentina) Federico Higuaín	Columbus Crew SC
2013	(Argentina) Diego Valeri	Portland Timbers
2014	(Chile) Pedro Morales	Vancouver Whitecaps FC
2015	(Italy) Sebastian Giovinco	Toronto FC
2016	(Uruguay) Nicolás Lodeiro	Seattle Sounders FC
2017	(Paraguay) Miguel Almirón	Atlanta United FC
2018	(Sweden) Zlatan Ibrahimović	LA Galaxy
2019	(Spain) Carles Gil	New England Revolution
2020	(Armenia) Lucas Zelarayán	Columbus Crew SC
2021	(Colombia) Cristian Arango	Los Angeles FC
2022	(Argentina) Thiago Almada	Atlanta United FC
2023	(Greece) Giorgos Giakoumakis	Atlanta United FC
2024	(Brazil) Gabriel Pec	LA Galaxy
2025	(Denmark) Anders Dreyer	San Diego FC
2026	(France) Antoine Griezmann	Orlando City SC
