= 2013 MLS Cup playoffs =

2013 edition of the MLS playoffs

Tournament details
- Country: United States; Canada
- Teams: 10

Final positions
- Champions: Sporting Kansas City (2nd title)
- Runners-up: Real Salt Lake
- Semifinalists: Houston Dynamo; Portland Timbers

Tournament statistics
- Matches played: 15
- Goals scored: 42 (2.8 per match)
- Attendance: 328,402 (21,893 per match)
- Top goal scorer(s): (France) Aurélien Collin (3 goals)

The 2013 MLS Cup playoffs was the eighteenth post-season tournament culminating the Major League Soccer regular season. The tournament began in late October and culminated on December 7, 2013, with MLS Cup 2013, the eighteenth league championship for MLS. This was the third year that the playoffs included ten teams, and the second playoff series since 2006 in which teams could not cross conference brackets. The top five teams in both the Eastern and Western conferences of the league earned berths, with the top three clubs in each conference earning direct byes to the conference semifinals. The fourth and fifth-place finishers of both conferences competed in a single-elimination play-in match.

The play-in winner played their respective conference regular season champion in the conference semifinals, which was a two-leg aggregate series, without the away goals rule enforced. For the second year in a row, each conference final was also a two-leg aggregate series, as opposed to the traditional single elimination match. The conference winners met in the MLS Cup, a single match hosted by the finalist with the better regular season record.

The Los Angeles Galaxy were the defending champions, having defeated Houston Dynamo 3–1 in the 2012 MLS Cup.

In a break from previous years, only Sporting Kansas City, the MLS Cup winner, directly entered the 2014–15 CONCACAF Champions League, earning a Pot A seed. They were joined by the New York Red Bulls, the Supporters' Shield winner; the Portland Timbers, the conference winner from the conference opposite the Supporters' Shield winner; and D.C. United, the 2013 U.S. Open Cup champion. However, none of these berths were available to the league's three Canadian teams, which instead participated in the Canadian Championship for that country's single berth in the CONCACAF Champions League. The change from the MLS Cup runner-up gaining entry to the CONCACAF Champions League to the opposite conference winner gaining entry was new for 2013. The change was announced after the MLS Cup had been played, with the announcement stating that the teams knew in advance.

== Format ==
For the 2013 playoffs, the league kept the format the same as the 2012 edition. In 2012, the league's previous system of "wild card" qualification—which had the potential for "crossover" series in which one team could play in the other conference's bracket—was scrapped. Instead, the new system had the top five teams in each conference qualify for the playoffs, with the two conference brackets being entirely separate. The first round of each conference was a one-off match between the fourth and fifth-placed teams, similar to the previous wild card system, with the fourth-placed team hosting. The first round winner advanced to play the conference's top seed in the conference semifinals, while the other two teams played each other in the other series.

The conference semifinals and conference finals were conducted in a home-and-away aggregate-goal format, with the higher seed hosting the second leg. If the teams were tied after two games, a 30-minute extra time period (divided into two 15-minute periods) was played, followed by a penalty shoot-out if necessary. The away goals rule and golden goal were not used.

In the case of ties in the first round or MLS Cup, extra time and a penalty shoot-out would be used in the same manner as above.

== Qualified teams ==
Eastern Conference

Pos	Team	Pld	W	L	T	GF	GA	GD	Pts	Qualification
1	New York Red Bulls	34	17	9	8	58	41	+17	59	MLS Cup Conference Semifinals
2	Sporting Kansas City	34	17	10	7	47	30	+17	58	MLS Cup Conference Semifinals
3	New England Revolution	34	14	11	9	49	38	+11	51	MLS Cup Conference Semifinals
4	Houston Dynamo	34	14	11	9	41	41	0	51	MLS Cup Knockout Round
5	Montreal Impact	34	14	13	7	50	49	+1	49	MLS Cup Knockout Round
6	Chicago Fire	34	14	13	7	47	52	−5	49	
7	Philadelphia Union	34	12	12	10	42	44	−2	46	
8	Columbus Crew	34	12	17	5	42	46	−4	41	
9	Toronto FC	34	6	17	11	30	47	−17	29	
10	D.C. United	34	3	24	7	22	59	−37	16	

Source: MLS

Western Conference

Pos	Team	Pld	W	L	T	GF	GA	GD	Pts	Qualification
1	Portland Timbers	34	14	5	15	54	33	+21	57	MLS Cup Conference Semifinals
2	Real Salt Lake	34	16	10	8	57	41	+16	56	MLS Cup Conference Semifinals
3	LA Galaxy	34	15	11	8	53	38	+15	53	MLS Cup Conference Semifinals
4	Seattle Sounders FC	34	15	12	7	42	42	0	52	MLS Cup Knockout Round
5	Colorado Rapids	34	14	11	9	45	38	+7	51	MLS Cup Knockout Round
6	San Jose Earthquakes	34	14	11	9	35	42	−7	51	
7	Vancouver Whitecaps FC	34	13	12	9	53	45	+8	48	
8	FC Dallas	34	11	12	11	48	52	−4	44	
9	Chivas USA	34	6	20	8	30	67	−37	26	

Source: MLS

=== Tiebreak rules ===
If two or more teams were tied in standings on points, the following tiebreak rules applied:

1. Most wins
2. Goals scored
3. Goal differential
4. Fewest disciplinary points in the official points table (Note: Archived August 10, 2012, at the Wayback Machine) (foul: 1 pt, first yellow: 3 pts, second yellow: 5 pts, straight red: 6 pts, disciplinary commission suspension: 6 pts, etc.)
5. Away goals scored
6. Away goal differential
7. Home goals scored
8. Home goal differential
9. Coin toss (two teams) or drawing of lots (three or more teams)

== Bracket ==
Knockout round
E4	Houston Dynamo	3
E5	Montreal Impact	0
W4	Seattle Sounders FC	2
W5	Colorado Rapids	0

Conference semifinals
E1	New York Red Bulls	2	1	3
E4	Houston Dynamo (a.e.t.)	2	2	4
Eastern Conference
E2	Sporting Kansas City (a.e.t.)	1	3	4
E3	New England Revolution	2	1	3
W1	Portland Timbers	2	3	5
W4	Seattle Sounders FC	1	2	3
Western Conference
W2	Real Salt Lake (a.e.t.)	0	2	2
W3	Los Angeles Galaxy	1	0	1

Conference finals
E4	Houston Dynamo	0	1	1
E2	Sporting Kansas City	0	2	2
W1	Portland Timbers	2	0	2
W2	Real Salt Lake	4	1	5

MLS Cup
E2	Sporting Kansas City (p)	1 (7)
W2	Real Salt Lake	1 (6)

== Knockout round ==
=== Eastern Conference ===
October 31
7:30 pm CDT

Houston Dynamo	3–0	Montreal Impact
Bruin 16', 72'; García 27' (pen.)	Report

BBVA Compass Stadium, Houston, Texas
Attendance: 10,476
Referee: Mark Geiger

=== Western Conference ===
October 30
7:30 pm PDT

Seattle Sounders FC	2–0	Colorado Rapids
Evans 28'; Johnson 90+3'	Report

CenturyLink Field, Seattle, Washington
Attendance: 32,204
Referee: Silviu Petrescu

== Conference semifinals ==
=== Eastern Conference ===
November 2
8:00 pm EDT

New England Revolution	2–1	Sporting Kansas City
Dorman 55'; Rowe 67'	Report	Collin 69'

Gillette Stadium, Foxborough, Massachusetts
Attendance: 15,164
Referee: Ismail Elfath
November 6
8:00 pm CST

Sporting Kansas City	3–1 (a.e.t.)	New England Revolution
Collin 41'; Sinovic 79'; Bieler 113'	Report	Imbongo 70'

Sporting Park, Kansas City, Kansas
Attendance: 19,031
Referee: Mark Geiger

Sporting Kansas City won 4–3 on aggregate.

November 3
3:30 pm EST

Houston Dynamo	2–2	New York Red Bulls
Clark 51'; Cummings 90+2'	Report	Cahill 22'; Alexander 32'

BBVA Compass Stadium, Houston, Texas
Attendance: 20,626
Referee: Ricardo Salazar
November 6
8:00 pm EST

New York Red Bulls	1–2 (a.e.t.)	Houston Dynamo
Wright-Phillips 23'	Report	Davis 36'; Cummings 104'

Red Bull Arena, Harrison, New Jersey
Attendance: 22,264
Referee: Silviu Petrescu

Houston Dynamo won 4–3 on aggregate.

=== Western Conference ===
November 2
7:00 pm PDT

Seattle Sounders FC	1–2	Portland Timbers
Alonso 90'	Report	Johnson 15'; Nagbe 67'

CenturyLink Field, Seattle, Washington
Attendance: 38,507
Referee: Baldomero Toledo
November 7
8:00 pm PST

Portland Timbers	3–2	Seattle Sounders FC
Johnson 29' (pen.); Valeri 44'; Danso 47'	Report	Yedlin 74'; Johnson 76'

Jeld-Wen Field, Portland, Oregon
Attendance: 20,674
Referee: Hilario Grajeda

Portland Timbers won 5–3 on aggregate.

November 3
6:00 pm PST

Los Angeles Galaxy	1–0	Real Salt Lake
Franklin 48'	Report

StubHub Center, Carson, California
Attendance: 27,000
Referee: Kevin Stott
November 7
7:00 pm MST

Real Salt Lake	2–0 (a.e.t.)	Los Angeles Galaxy
Velásquez 35'; Schuler 102'	Report

Rio Tinto Stadium, Sandy, Utah
Attendance: 19,042
Referee: Baldomero Toledo

Real Salt Lake won 2–1 on aggregate.

== Conference finals ==
=== Eastern Conference ===
November 9
1:30 pm CST

Houston Dynamo	0–0	Sporting Kansas City
	Report

BBVA Compass Stadium, Houston, Texas
Attendance: 22,107
Referee: Kevin Stott
November 23
6:30 pm CST

Sporting Kansas City	2–1	Houston Dynamo
Sapong 14'; Dwyer 63'	Report	Garcia 3'

Sporting Park, Kansas City, Kansas
Attendance: 21,650
Referee: Baldomero Toledo

Sporting Kansas City won 2–1 on aggregate.

=== Western Conference ===
November 10
7:00 pm MST

Real Salt Lake	4–2	Portland Timbers
Schuler 35'; Findley 41'; Sandoval 48'; Morales 82'	Report	Johnson 14'; Piquionne 90+4'

Rio Tinto Stadium, Sandy, Utah
Attendance: 17,333
Referee: Armando Villarreal
November 24
6:00 pm PST

Portland Timbers	0–1	Real Salt Lake
	Report	Findley 29'

Jeld-Wen Field, Portland, Oregon
Attendance: 20,674
Referee: Mark Geiger

Real Salt Lake won 5–2 on aggregate.

== MLS Cup 2013 ==
December 7, 2013
3:00 p.m. CST

Sporting Kansas City	1–1 (a.e.t.)	Real Salt Lake
Collin 76'	Report	Saborío 52'
Penalties
Bieler (penalty scored); Nagamura (penalty scored); Besler (penalty missed); Feilhaber (penalty scored); Zusi (penalty missed); Sinovic (penalty scored); Sapong (penalty scored); Olum (penalty missed); Myers (penalty scored); Collin (penalty scored)	7–6	(penalty missed) Saborío; (penalty missed) Grabavoy; (penalty scored) Beckerman; (penalty scored) Plata; (penalty scored) Morales; (penalty scored) Schuler; (penalty scored) Beltran; (penalty missed) Velásquez; (penalty scored) Borchers; (penalty missed) Palmer

Sporting Park, Kansas City, Kansas
Attendance: 21,650
Referee: Hilario Grajeda

== See also ==
- 2013 in American soccer
- 2013 U.S. Open Cup
