= Diego Valeri =

Argentine footballer (born 1986)

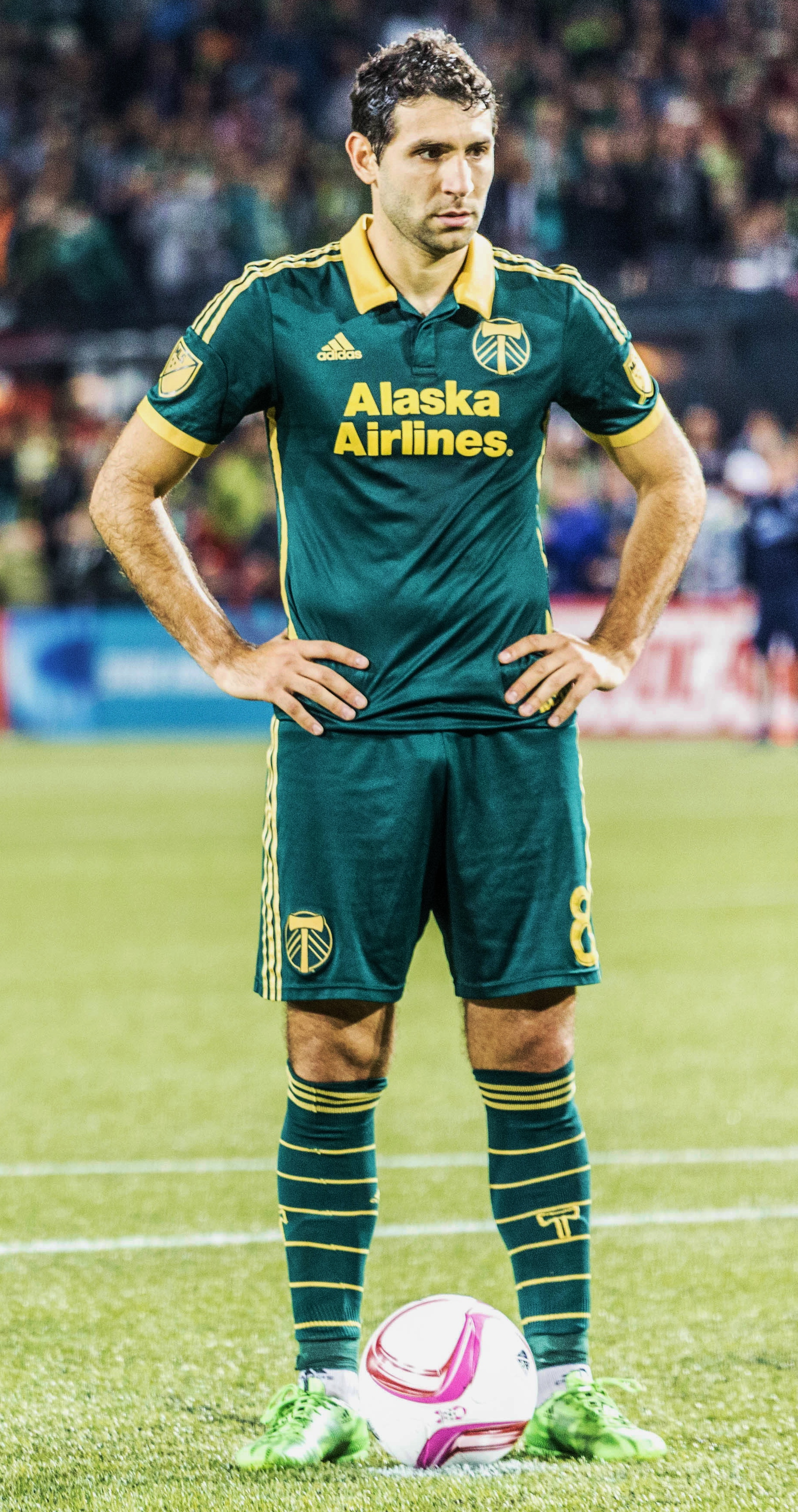
- Valeri playing for the Portland Timbers in 2015

Personal information
- Full name: Diego Hernán Valeri
- Date of birth: 1 May 1986 (age 40)
- Place of birth: Lanús, Argentina
- Height: 5 ft 10 in (1.77 m)
- Position: Attacking midfielder

Youth career
- –2003: Lanús

Senior career*
Years	Team	Apps	(Gls)
2003–2013	Lanús	158	(25)
2009–2010	→ Porto (loan)	12	(0)
2010	→ Almería (loan)	9	(0)
2013	→ Portland Timbers (loan)	20	(4)
2013–2021	Portland Timbers	242	(82)
2022	Lanús	9	(1)
Total		450	(112)

International career
2011	Argentina	3	(0)
- * Club domestic league appearances and goals

Diego Hernán Valeri (born 1 May 1986) is an Argentine former professional footballer who played as an attacking midfielder.

From 2013 to 2021, Valeri played for Major League Soccer club Portland Timbers, and is regarded as one of the league's greatest players of all time, as well as the greatest player in Portland Timbers history. Valeri was named the MLS Cup Most Valuable Player after he led the Timbers to win MLS Cup 2015. He was later presented as the MLS MVP following his career-setting 2017 season. While in Major League Soccer, Valeri was selected into the MLS All-Star team four times and was included three times in the MLS Best XI.

Valeri began his career with his boyhood club Lanús. Promoted to the first team by head coach Miguel Ángel Brindisi, Valeri made his Primera División debut in September 2003 against Vélez Sarsfield. He soon broke into the starting line-up more consistently, having his breakout season in 2007–08, helping Lanús to the Torneo Apertura title. In 2009, Valeri joined Portuguese club Porto on loan for the 2009–10 season, helping the club win the Taça de Portugal. The next season, Valeri was loaned out to Spanish club Almería, where his loan was eventually ended early in December 2010.

In August 2012, Valeri and his family were victims in an armed robbery in Lanús. The incident lead to Valeri instructing his agent to pursue a move abroad more aggressively. In January 2013, Valeri joined the Portland Timbers on loan for the 2013 season. The deal was eventually made permanent in August 2013. In his debut season, Valeri helped the club top the Western Conference standings, earning him the MLS Newcomer of the Year award. In December 2015, he scored the opening goal for the Timbers' after 27 seconds against the Columbus Crew in MLS Cup 2015. The fastest goal in MLS Cup history, the Timbers went on to defeat the Crew and win their first ever championship. Two seasons later, Valeri registered his best season statistically, posting a career-high 21 goals while recording 11 assists. He helped the Timbers top the Western Conference standings and won the MLS Most Valuable Player award. The following season, Valeri helped lead his side to MLS Cup 2018 against Atlanta United FC, where they were defeated 0–2. In August 2020, Valeri helped captain the Timbers to the final of the MLS is Back Tournament, defeating Orlando City SC.

Valeri is the all-time leading goalscorer for the Portland Timbers with 100 goals in all competitions. He is the 14th all-time top scorer and is 10th all-time in assists in Major League Soccer history.

Valeri earned three caps for Argentina, all occurring in 2011. He made his international debut for his country on 16 March against Venezuela as Argentina won 4–1.

== Early life ==
Born in the industrial city of Lanús, a suburb of Buenos Aires on 1 May 1986, Valeri is the son of Luis, a former footballer turned shoe factory owner, and Monica, a former tennis player for the local athletic club. As a child, Valeri played football among his friends. When Valeri turned nine, through his mother, he participated in a trial with the local football club Club Atlético Lanús. Valeri was recruited into the club's youth team and played with the club's youth sides for five years before being promoted into the reserves.

== Club career ==
=== Lanús ===
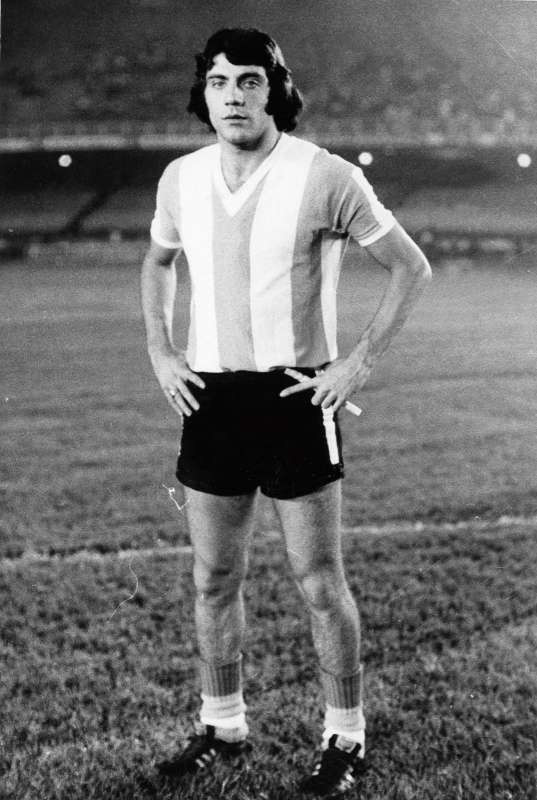
Under Miguel Ángel Brindisi, pictured here, Valeri was promoted to the Lanús first team and made his pro debut.

After impressing with the reserves, Valeri was promoted into the Lanús first team under head coach Miguel Ángel Brindisi. He made his professional debut on 27 September 2003 against Vélez Sarsfield. During his time at Lanús, Valeri played in 158 matches, scoring 25 goals in the Argentine Primera División. During the 2007–08 season, Valeri scored a season-high 8 goals in 26 matches and helped Lanús to the Apertura title.

Towards the end of his time at Lanús, Valeri was named club captain.

==== Porto (loan) ====
On 17 July 2009, Valeri joined Portuguese Primeira Liga club FC Porto on a two-season loan with a purchase option. He made his debut for Porto on 23 August 2009 against Nacional, coming on as a substitute for Raul Meireles in the 75th minute of a 3–0 victory. Valeri then made his UEFA Champions League debut on 30 September 2009 during a 2–0 victory against Atlético Madrid, coming on as a stoppage time substitute.

During his loan at Porto, Valeri played four matches in the Taça de Portugal to help Porto earn their 15th domestic cup title. He came on as a 72nd-minute substitute for the club in the final against Chaves as Porto won 2–1.

Following his first season with Porto, it was reported that Valeri did not fit into the plans for new manager André Villas-Boas. He also had a tough time adapting at the club, citing the pressure and demand to perform while playing outside his home country for the first time.

==== Almería (loan) ====
On 9 July 2010, it was reported that Spanish La Liga club Almería were negotiating with Porto to sign Valeri on loan. On 21 July 2010, Valeri was presented as an Almería player, arriving on loan for the 2010–11 season. He made his debut for the club on 13 September 2010 against Real Sociedad. He started and played 72 minutes as the match ended in a 2–2 draw.

Valeri's loan with Almería was ended early on 30 December 2010, with him returning to Lanús.

==== Portland Timbers (loan) ====
On 10 January 2013, Valeri joined Major League Soccer club Portland Timbers on loan for the 2013 season. He was signed as one of the Timbers' designated players. Prior to moving to the United States, two other Major League Soccer clubs were in discussions to sign Valeri – the Chicago Fire and Timbers rival Seattle Sounders FC. Valeri and his agent met with the Fire and their technical staff but a deal never materialized and the Sounders held the discovery rights to Valeri. He also spoke with former Lanús teammate Javier Morales, then at Real Salt Lake, before signing with the Timbers.

Valeri made his debut for the Portland Timbers on 3 March 2013 in the season opener against the New York Red Bulls. He started and scored his first Timbers goal in the 14th minute, an equalizer to make it 1–1. The match went on to end in a 3–3 draw.

=== Portland Timbers ===
==== Newcomer of the Year (2013–2014) ====
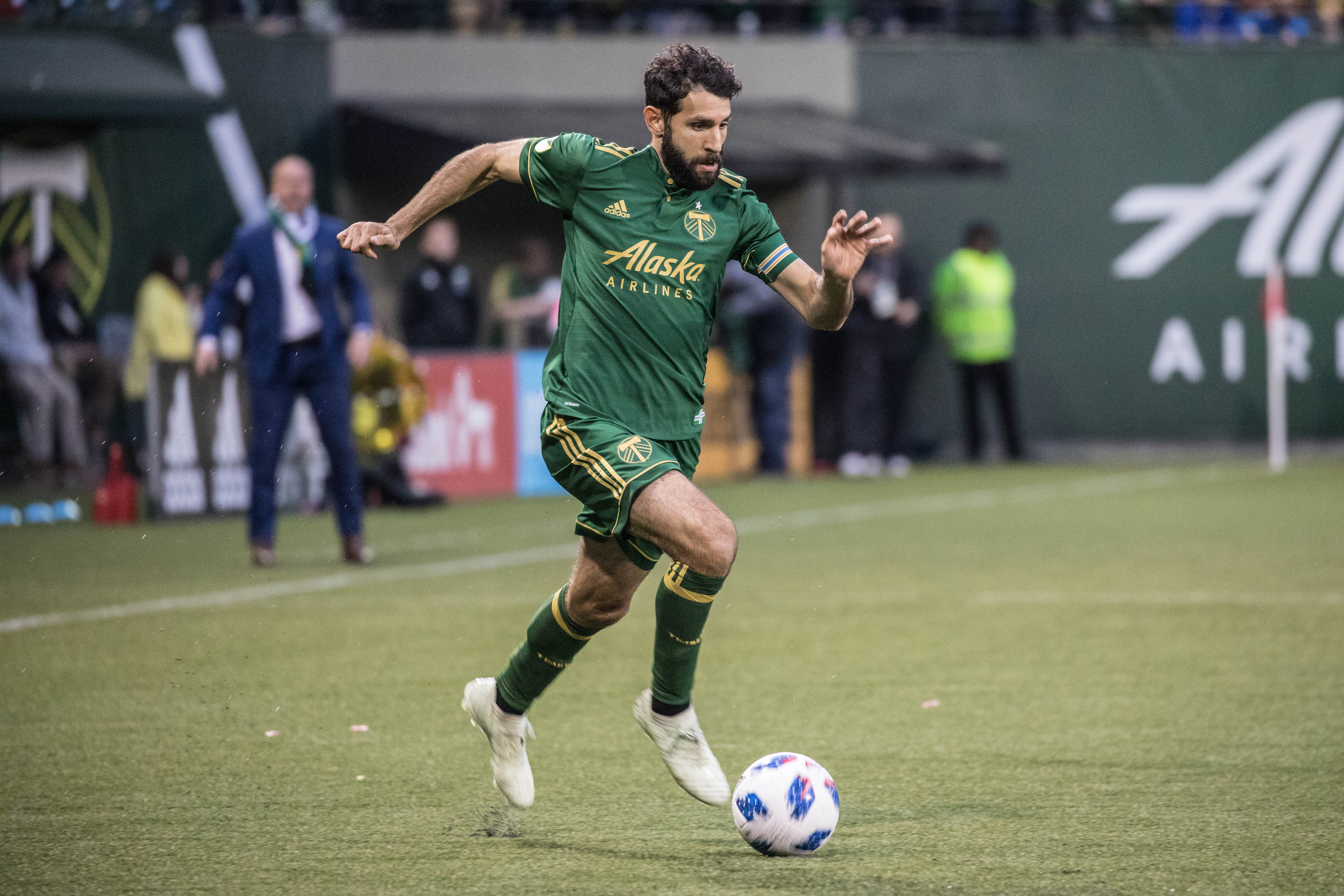
Valeri playing for the Portland Timbers in 2018

On 6 August 2013, after he scored four goals and earned eight assists in 20 matches, the Portland Timbers exercised their purchase agreement with Lanús and signed Valeri to a multi-year contract. A day later, on 7 August, Valeri scored a consolation goal for the Timbers in their 2–1 defeat against Real Salt Lake in the U.S. Open Cup. Valeri went on to finish his first season with the Portland Timbers with 10 goals and 13 assists, being named as the league's Newcomer of the Year. He also earned a selection in that seasons MLS Best XI.

The next season, on 19 July 2014, Valeri was selected to be part of the MLS All-Star team that would play against Bayern Munich. During the match on 6 August, Valeri providing the game-winning assist for Landon Donovan in the 70th minute to help the MLS All-Stars win 2–1. At the end of the season, Valeri was selected into his second consecutive MLS Best XI.

==== MLS Cup Champion (2015–2016) ====
It was the first time in my career that someone decided to do that. I went on loan to Porto and Almería and it was the first time a club decided to buy me. I didn't play for a lot of teams, and for me it was important and I was very happy and I wanted to give back to them. That's what motivated me in this club.

— Valeri in regards to the Portland Timbers signing him permanently from Lanús.

During the Portland Timbers final regular-season match of 2014 against FC Dallas, Valeri tore his ACL and was sidelined to start the 2015 season. Valeri made his first appearance on 2 May 2015 against Vancouver Whitecaps FC, coming on as a 52nd-minute substitute for Ishmael Yartey as the Timbers drew 0–0. Valeri went on to become a regular again for Portland as he helped lead the club into the 2015 MLS playoffs before securing the club's spot in MLS Cup 2015 through a 5–3 aggregate victory over FC Dallas in the Conference Finals.

Valeri was a starter for the Portland Timbers against the Columbus Crew for MLS Cup 2015. He opened the scoring for the club after just 27 seconds, deflecting a clearance from Columbus goalkeeper Steve Clark to give the Timbers the very early lead. Valeri's goal was the fastest scored in MLS Cup history. The Portland Timbers went on to win the match 2–1, earning their first-ever MLS Cup championship. Valeri was later named as the MLS Cup Most Valuable Player for his performance during the final.

Following their success, the Timbers were expected to be a contender for MLS Cup 2016. Despite the losses of forward Maximiliano Urruti, defender Jorge Villafaña, and captain Will Johnson, the Timbers retained main offensive starters Valeri, Darlington Nagbe, and club top-scorer Fanendo Adi. There were also higher expectations for forward Lucas Melano, who arrived midway through the previous season as a designated player from Valeri's former club Lanús. During the season, Valeri had another productive campaign as he scored 14 goals and earned seven assists. His goals count being second among Timbers players and second among midfielders in MLS. On 28 July 2016, Valeri was named into his second MLS All-Star squad. The All-Stars took on Premier League side Arsenal. On 10 August 2016, Valeri signed a three-year contract extension with the Portland Timbers.

Despite Valeri's performance during the season, as well as from Adi, the Portland Timbers failed to qualify for the playoffs. A 4–1 defeat to the Vancouver Whitecaps FC on Decision Day meant that the Timbers finished two points behind 6th-placed Real Salt Lake in the standings. Throughout the season, the Timbers failed to win a single match away from home, hurting their qualification chances. The failure from the Portland Timbers to qualify for the playoffs, as well as from their MLS Cup 2015 opponents Columbus Crew, meant that for the first time in league history, neither finalist from the previous season qualified for the following playoffs.

==== MVP year and Second MLS Cup appearance (2017–2019) ====
During the 2017 season, Valeri scored 21 goals and earned 11 assists, becoming just the second player in league history to record at least 20 goals and 10 assists across an entire season. He also broke the league record for most consecutive games with a goal, scoring a goal in 9 straight matches between 29 July and 24 September. Valeri earned his third All-Star selection and played the second half of the match against Real Madrid. On 12 August, Valeri became the 18th player in Major League Soccer history to score 50 goals and earn 50 assists when he scored during a 4–1 defeat against Toronto FC. A little more than a week later, on 23 August, Valeri became the Timbers all-time top goalscorer; scoring the first goal in a 2–1 victory over the Colorado Rapids and breaking the record set earlier that season by teammate Fanendo Adi. Valeri's performances throughout the season were instrumental in securing Portland Timbers the top spot in the Western Conference standings and qualifying for the playoffs. The Timbers playoff journey began in the Conference Semifinals against the Houston Dynamo. The club were knocked-out after losing 2–1 on aggregate. Despite the early defeat, Valeri was awarded the Landon Donovan MVP Award on 4 December 2017.

Following his MVP season, Valeri scored 14 goals and assisted 14 during the 2018 campaign. That season, Valeri, alongside former Lanús teammate Sebastián Blanco, helped lead the Portland Timbers back into the MLS Cup playoffs. During the Knockout Round match against FC Dallas on 31 October, Valeri scored a brace to give the Timbers a 2–1 victory. In the next round, the Timbers took on rivals Seattle Sounders FC in the Conference Semifinals. Valeri assisted both goals for the Timbers as the club took a 2–1 aggregate lead after the first leg of the tie. In the second leg, the Sounders won the match 3–2 after extra-time which lead to penalty kicks. Valeri converted his penalty as the Timbers won 4–2, advancing to the Conference Finals. The Portland Timbers took on Sporting Kansas City in the Western Conference Finals. After a 0–0 draw in the first leg, Valeri scored a brace in the second leg to help the Timbers win 3–2 and thus advance to MLS Cup 2018. He would go on to start in MLS Cup against Atlanta United FC on 8 December 2018 but couldn't prevent his side from losing 2–0.

The next season in 2019, Valeri recorded a career-best 16 assists, which also broke the club record for most assists in a single-season. Valeri helped the Portland Timbers qualify for their third-straight MLS Cup playoff appearance. They were knocked-out in the first round by Real Salt Lake.

==== Final years: MLS is Back champion and Third MLS Cup appearance (2020–2021) ====
Prior to the 2020 season, on 16 December 2019, after declining his contract option, Valeri signed another contract extension with the Portland Timbers. This deal reduced Valeri from being a designated player as the Timbers used Targeted Allocation Money to re-sign and buy down Valeri's contract. Due to the COVID-19 pandemic, the Portland Timbers participated in the MLS is Back Tournament held in Orlando, Florida, with Valeri acting as club captain. On 11 August 2020, Valeri started for the Timbers during the final against Orlando City SC. The Portland Timbers went on to win 2–1. On 2 September 2020, Valeri became the third player in Major League Soccer history to score at least 80 goals and earn 80 assists – alongside Landon Donovan and Jaime Moreno. Following the 2020 season, Valeri was named by the league among its 25 best players of all time. He had been top scorer in four of his nine years with the club and top equal in one, his best being 21 goals in 2017.

For the 2021 season, Valeri took on a reduced role, starting only 10 of the 29 matches during the campaign. One highlight for the season included scoring his 100th goal for the Timbers, which happened against LAFC on 21 July. He made his final appearance with the Timbers at MLS Cup 2021 on 11 December 2021, which took place at home at Providence Park. Coming in as a substitute at the end of regular time, Valeri and the Timers took the match to a penalty shootout as the game ended 1–1 at the end of extra time. Valeri missed his penalty as the Timbers lost the shootout 4–2.

Valeri scored 100 goals for the Timbers across all competitions during his time in Portland. He left the team as their regular season leader in goals scored, assists, and points.

=== Return to Lanús and retirement with Portland Timbers ===
On 20 January 2022, the Timbers and Valeri mutually agreed on his transfer back to Club Atlético Lanús. The Timbers announced a testimonial match for Valeri between them and Lanús in 2023, and upon retirement Valeri would become a Timbers ambassador. On 2 June 2022, 36-year old Valeri confirmed he had decided to retire. He signed a one-day contract with the Portland Timbers on 14 July 2023 to retire as a member of the organization.

== International career ==
On 16 March 2011, Valeri made his international debut for Argentina at the Estadio San Juan del Bicentenario in a friendly against Venezuela. Argentina won 4–1. Valeri went on to make just two more appearances with Argentina, both in 2011, against Ecuador and Paraguay. In June 2011, prior to Copa América, Valeri was included in the provisional squad for Argentina by manager Sergio Batista but was cut from the final 23-man squad.

== Style of play ==
A technically gifted player, Valeri was capable of both scoring and creating goals. When he joined the Portland Timbers in 2013, he was brought in to become the creative force of the offense for coach Caleb Porter. "He will be one of the better playmakers in the league, but more importantly Diego fits our identity and his play should boost production to help the club win games," stated Porter after Valeri signed with the Timbers. Throughout his time with the Timbers, Valeri was considered the creative spark for the club. During his first season in Portland, Valeri adapted into the middle of Porter's 4–3–3 formation, forming a partnership with central midfielders Diego Chará and Will Johnson. That partnership allowed Valeri the freedom he needed to score ten goals and provide thirteen assists in his first season with the club.

Valeri was known to be the creative lynchpin and key to the Portland Timbers attack. Considered to be a skilled passer who was able to get the ball to his forwards in great positions, Valeri was not only known for his offensive ability but also for being able to contribute defensively by dropping back and helping start a Timbers counterattack. Prior to a match in 2014, former Toronto FC coach Greg Vanney stated that Valeri was "clever" and that "you don't really want to send your marking guy to the outside to deal with him".

When former Lanús teammate Sebastián Blanco arrived at the Timbers, both he and Valeri began a partnership that would be key to the Portland offense. Valeri continued to play as the central attacking midfielder while Blanco would interchange between playing centrally and going out wide to the wing. According to Timbers general manager, Gavin Wilkinson, this partnership helped Valeri reach a career-high 21 goals during his MVP season. Despite not being a full-game starter for the Timbers in 2020, coach Giovanni Savarese stated, "his movements are very sharp, his quality is still intact and he's taking care of himself in the best possible way."

== Personal life ==
Valeri married his childhood sweetheart Florencia in 2007. She is also from Lanús and was Valeri's neighbor growing up. The couple have a daughter named Constanza who was born in 2009. While Valeri was still playing in Argentina, Florencia regularly attended matches for Club Atlético Lanús but after the birth of their daughter, the couple decided that it might be too dangerous to attend games. In October 2012, Valeri and his family were victims of a carjacking near their home as armed robbers stole Valeri's BMW X1, wallet, and cell phone. According to Valeri, the carjacking was a major reason that he and his family decided to move out of Argentina.

Prior to his move to the Portland Timbers, Valeri had never heard of Portland, Oregon. He had only visited the United States once, in 2004, when he was part of the Lanús side that took on a Japanese club in a pre-season friendly at Dignity Health Sports Park in Los Angeles. Not long after the move, Valeri and his family began to embrace life in Portland, which they felt was very safe. Additionally, the family began to participate in local community service initiatives and charities, with his work off-the-pitch earning Valeri the nickname "Saint Valeri". He has also developed a deep relationship with the supporters' groups of the Portland Timbers, regularly participating in local football events and matches. Valeri and his family also regularly attend matches for National Women's Soccer League club Portland Thorns, the sister club of the Timbers. Valeri has stated that the Thorns serve as a major inspiration for his daughter and her future hopes and dreams.

== Career statistics ==
=== Club ===
Appearances and goals by club, season and competition
Club	Season	League			National cup (Note: Includes Copa Argentina, Taça de Portugal, Copa del Rey, U.S. Open Cup)		League cup (Note: Includes Taça da Liga)		Continental		Other		Total	
Club	Season	Division	Apps	Goals	Apps	Goals	Apps	Goals	Apps	Goals	Apps	Goals	Apps	Goals
Lanús	2003–04	Argentine Primera División	3	0	—		—		—		—		3	0
Lanús	2004–05	Argentine Primera División	13	1	—		—		—		—		13	1
Lanús	2005–06	Argentine Primera División	7	1	—		—		—		—		7	1
Lanús	2006–07	Argentine Primera División	20	0	—		—		4 (Note: Appearance(s) in Copa Sudamericana)	1	—		24	1
Lanús	2007–08	Argentine Primera División	26	8	—		—		13 (Note: Four appearances in Copa Sudamericana, nine appearances and one goal in Copa Libertadores)	1	—		39	9
Lanús	2008–09	Argentine Primera División	27	2	—		—		4 (Note: Appearance(s) in Copa Libertadores)	0	—		31	2
Lanús	2010–11	Argentine Primera División	18	8	—		—		1	0	—		19	8
Lanús	2011–12	Argentine Primera División	28	3	1	0	—		8	1	—		37	4
Lanús	2012–13	Argentine Primera División	16	2	0	0	—		—		—		16	2
Lanús	Total		158	25	1	0	—		30	3	—		189	28
Porto (loan)	2009–10	Primeira Liga	12	0	4	0	5	0	2 (Note: Appearances in UEFA Champions League)	0	0	0	23	0
Almería (loan)	2010–11	La Liga	9	0	3	0	—		—		—		12	0
Portland Timbers (loan)	2013	Major League Soccer	20	4	2	1	—		—		—		22	5
Portland Timbers	2013	Major League Soccer	11	6	1	1	—		—		4 (Note: Appearance(s) in MLS Cup playoffs)	1	16	8
Portland Timbers	2014	Major League Soccer	33	11	1	0	—		1 (Note: Appearance(s) in CONCACAF Champions League)	0	—		35	11
Portland Timbers	2015	Major League Soccer	22	2	2	1	—		—		5	1	29	4
Portland Timbers	2016	Major League Soccer	30	14	2	0	—		3	2	—		35	16
Portland Timbers	2017	Major League Soccer	32	21	0	0	—		—		2	0	34	21
Portland Timbers	2018	Major League Soccer	32	10	1	0	—		—		6	4	39	14
Portland Timbers	2019	Major League Soccer	31	8	4	0	—		—		1	0	36	8
Portland Timbers	2020	Major League Soccer	22 (Note: Includes three appearances and one goal in MLS is Back Tournament group stage)	8	—		—		—		5 (Note: Four appearances and one goal in MLS is Back Tournament knockout stage, one appearance in MLS Cup playoffs)	1	27	9
Portland Timbers	2021	Major League Soccer	29	2	—		—		4	2	3	0	36	4
Portland Timbers	Total		262	86	13	3	—		8	4	26	7	309	100
Lanús	2022	Argentine Primera División	9	1	1	0	—		2	0	—		12	1
Career total			450	112	22	3	5	0	42	7	26	7	545	129

=== International ===
Appearances and goals by national team and year
National team	Year	Apps	Goals
Argentina	2011	3	0
Total		3	0

== Honours ==
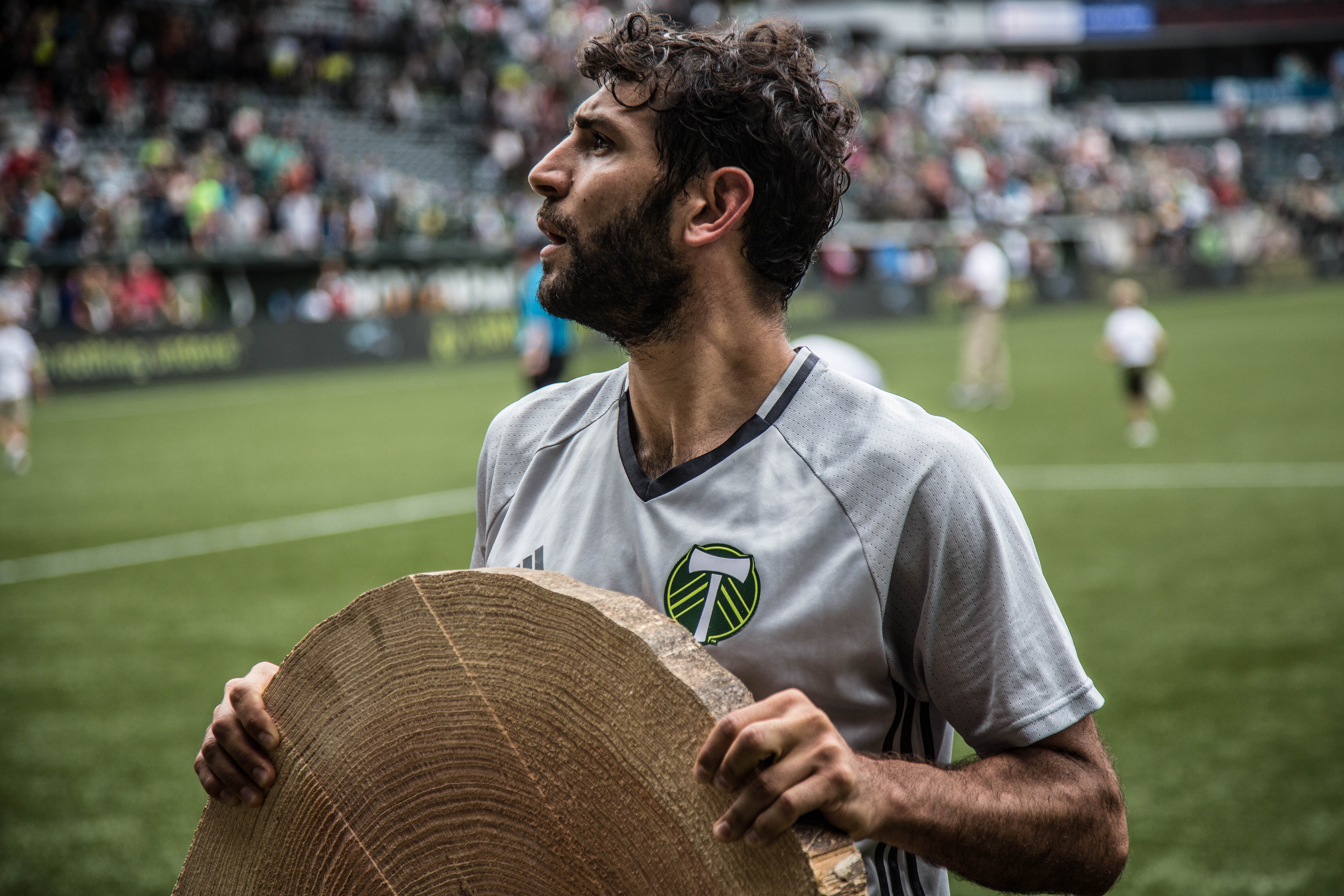
Valeri won both the MLS MVP and MLS Cup MVP awards while with Portland.

Lanús

- Argentine Primera División: 2007 Apertura

Porto

- Taça de Portugal: 2009–10
- Supertaça Cândido de Oliveira: 2009

Portland Timbers

- MLS Cup: 2015
- MLS is Back Tournament: 2020

Individual

- MLS Cup MVP: 2015
- MLS MVP: 2017
- MLS 50/50 Club
- MLS Newcomer of the Year: 2013
- MLS Best XI: 2013, 2014, 2017
- MLS All-Star: 2014, 2016, 2017, 2018
- MLS top assist provider: 2013
