= Donovan Ricketts =

Jamaican footballer (born 1977)

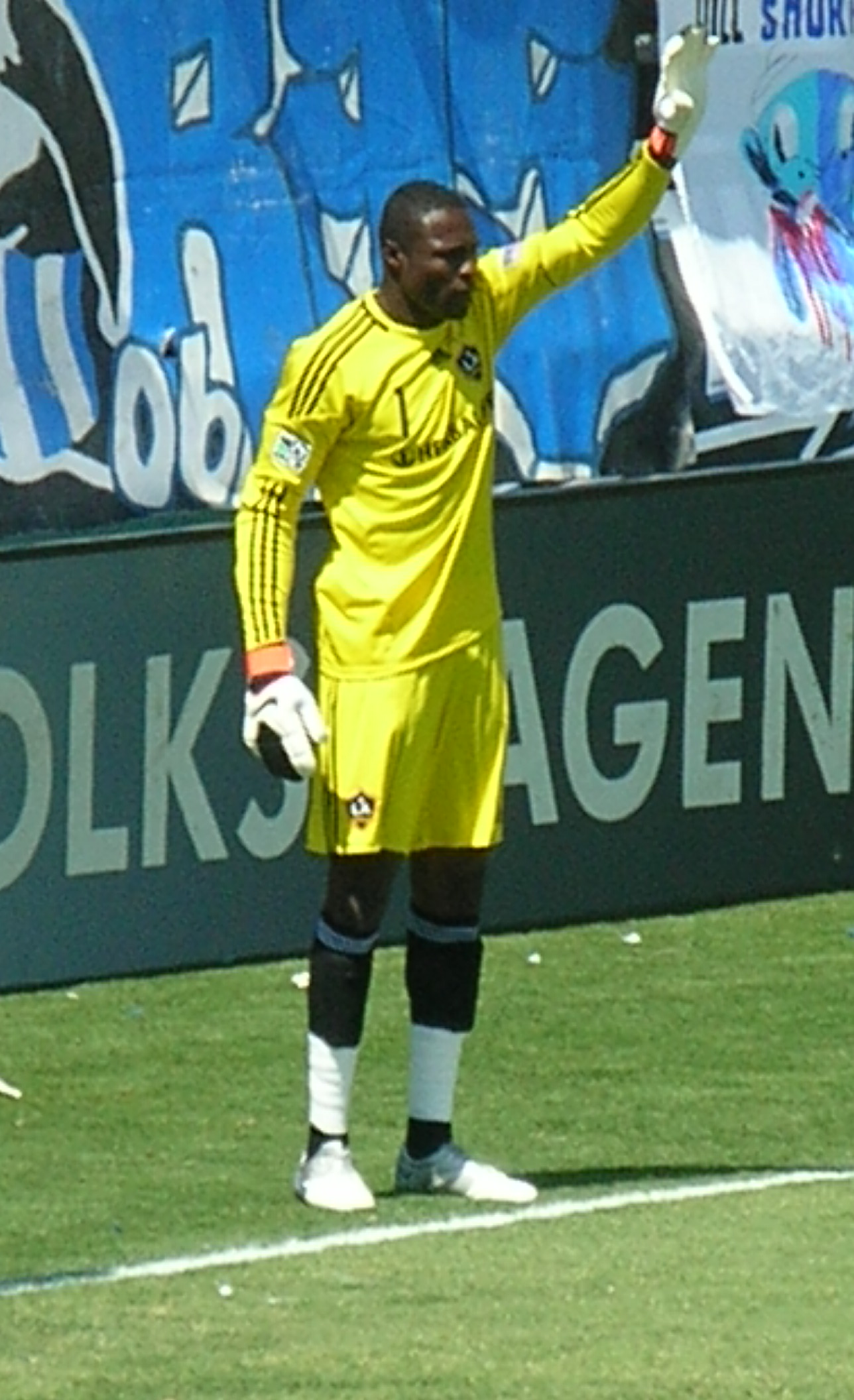
- Ricketts with the LA Galaxy in 2010

Personal information
- Full name: Donovan Damon Ricketts
- Date of birth: 7 June 1977 (age 49)
- Place of birth: Montego Bay, Jamaica
- Position: Goalkeeper

Youth career
- 1994–1997: Wadadah

Senior career*
Years	Team	Apps	(Gls)
1997–1998	Wadadah		
1998–2001	Seba United		
2001–2002	Galaxy F.C.		
2002–2004	Village United	19	(2)
2004–2005	Bolton Wanderers	0	(0)
2004–2005	→ Bradford City (loan)	4	(0)
2005–2008	Bradford City	104	(0)
2008	Village United	5	(0)
2009–2011	LA Galaxy	70	(0)
2012	Montreal Impact	24	(0)
2012–2014	Portland Timbers	73	(0)
2015	Orlando City	10	(0)
2015	LA Galaxy	11	(0)
2017	Tulsa Roughnecks	0	(0)

International career
1998–2014	Jamaica	100	(0)

Managerial career
- 2016: Emory Eagles (assistant)
- 2017–2023: FC Tulsa (assistant)
- 2022: FC Tulsa (interim)
- 2024: Carolina Core (goalkeeper coach)
- 2025–2026: Carolina Core
- * Club domestic league appearances and goals

Donovan Damon Ricketts (born 7 June 1977) is a Jamaican former professional footballer who played as a goalkeeper and coach. Ricketts played more than 100 games for Bradford City in England, and has more than 100 appearances in Major League Soccer and has twice been named MLS Goalkeeper of the Year. He was also the captain of the Jamaica national team, earning 100 caps for his country, until his retirement from international football in 2014.

== Club career ==
=== Early career ===
Ricketts attended Cornwall College where he played on the Dacosta Cup team. After high school, he played for teams such as Wadadah, Seba United, Galaxy F.C. and Village United in his native Jamaica. Ricketts attracted the attention of English clubs after an impressive performance for Jamaica against Brazil in a match played in Leicester in 2003. He failed to join fellow Reggae Boys Onandi Lowe and Paul Hall at Rushden & Diamonds FC after an unsuccessful trial, and signed instead for English Premier League side Bolton Wanderers in 2004.

=== Bradford City ===
Ricketts never played a game at Bolton and instead moved to Bradford City initially on a year-long loan in July 2004. He spent most of his first season in English football as understudy to Australian Paul Henderson before he finally made his debut in April 2005 and played in the final four games. During the season break he signed permanently on a two-year deal keeping him at City until 2007. He missed nine games because of a broken foot early in the 2005–06 season and was replaced by Russell Howarth. He regained his place against Port Vale, before he again missed a game in December 2005 after he was sent off for celebrating a City goal in a game at Southend United. He was immediately recalled to the side following his suspension, and played the following 80 league games, including as ever-present in the 2006–07 season.

His run of games came to an end when he was dropped in October 2007 after a poor run of form. He was recalled for the game against Brentford on 3 November 2007 after Rhys Evans' loan was cut short by injury, playing the next 13 games. He was expected to make a move to Queens Park Rangers during the January transfer window and was replaced by loan keeper Scott Loach for Bradford's 4–2 victory over Shrewsbury Town, but his move collapsed when he was refused a work permit. Despite Ricketts' return, Loach kept his place in the City side for their 1–0 win at Macclesfield Town, saving a second-half penalty, but manager Stuart McCall told Ricketts he could still have a future at the club. Loach continued to keep Ricketts out of the team since his arrival on loan from Watford. And after Ricketts had played for Jamaica in March 2008, he was stopped by immigration officials at Heathrow Airport and sent back to New York because he did not have the correct paperwork. Bradford were also told a new work permit application would be turned down. Instead, Ricketts returned to Jamaica to train with the country's under 21 side, before being one of 13 players to be released by Bradford manager Stuart McCall at the end of the season.

=== Return to Jamaica ===
Having spent the summer, training and playing with the Jamaican international side, he returned to his former side Village United in August 2008, under the management of Dean Weatherly. He lasted only 45 minutes in his return to the Village United side, after he complained of double vision at half-time after he was hit with the ball during the first half of a game with Portmore United. The game ended 1–1, with Portmore's goal coming from a mistake from Ricketts.

=== LA Galaxy ===
On 23 December 2008, LA Galaxy announced they had signed Ricketts for the 2009 Major League Soccer season. Ricketts also attracted interest from Canadian side Toronto FC but he opted to join LA Galaxy on the advice of his international colleague Tyrone Marshall, who had played for both sides.

Ricketts enjoyed a successful first season in Major League Soccer under Bruce Arena, leading the Galaxy to the Western Division title. His squad successfully reached the 2009 MLS Cup Final. In that championship final, he sustained a mid-game injury and was replaced backup goalkeeper Josh Saunders. Saunders filled in well, considering Ricketts started most of the games in the '09 season, but it was not enough to fend off Real Salt Lake, who won via penalties. In 2010, Ricketts was named MLS Goalkeeper of the Year. Ricketts did not play most of the 2011 season due to injury, and was replaced by Saunders again while his team won the 2011 MLS Cup.

=== Montreal Impact ===
On 28 November 2011 the Montreal Impact acquired Ricketts from the LA Galaxy in exchange for allocation money. Ricketts was protected in MLS Expansion Draft, necessitating a trade to acquire his services.

=== Portland Timbers ===
On 7 August 2012, Ricketts was traded to the Portland Timbers for goalkeeper Troy Perkins. He made his debut on 15 August 2012 in a 2–2 draw versus Toronto FC.

=== Later career ===
On 10 December 2014, Ricketts was chosen first by Orlando City SC in the 2014 MLS Expansion Draft.

Ricketts was traded by Orlando City back to LA Galaxy on 30 July 2015 in exchange for a second-round pick in the 2016 MLS SuperDraft. He was released from the club on 7 December 2015.

== International career ==
On 3 June 2006 he captained Jamaica in an international friendly against England at Old Trafford. Jamaica went on to lose the game 6–0.

Ricketts has been a big part of the Reggae Boyz programme, dating back to the days of former Technical Director Renê Simões. Ricketts has not only kept goal for Jamaica at the senior level, but has also done it at various junior levels for his country. He came through the national ranks under the guidance of goalkeeping coach, Paul Campbell.

Ricketts is a World Cup veteran, being named to the Jamaican squad that played in the 1998 FIFA World Cup in France. However, with Warren Barrett and Aaron Lawrence ahead of him in the pecking order, the opportunity never presented itself for him to see any game time. Ricketts represented Jamaica in all eight of their 2010 World Cup qualifying matches, where they were eliminated in the third round stage.

== Managerial career ==
After retiring from his playing career, Ricketts joined the full-time coaching staff of FC Tulsa in 2019. On June 17, 2022, Ricketts was named interim coach of Tulsa after the club parted ways with Michael Nsien.

Ricketts was named head coach of MLS Next Pro side Carolina Core in October 2024.

== Personal life ==
Ricketts received his U.S. green card in 2011 which qualified him as a domestic player for MLS roster purposes.

== Honors ==
LA Galaxy

- MLS Cup: 2011
- Major League Soccer Supporters' Shield: 2010, 2011
- Major League Soccer Western Conference Championship: 2009, 2011

Jamaica

- Caribbean Cup: 2005, 2008

Individual

- MLS Goalkeeper of the Year: 2010, 2013
- MLS Best XI: 2010, 2013

== See also ==
- List of men's footballers with 100 or more international caps
