= Hanyer Mosquera =

Colombian footballer (born 1987)

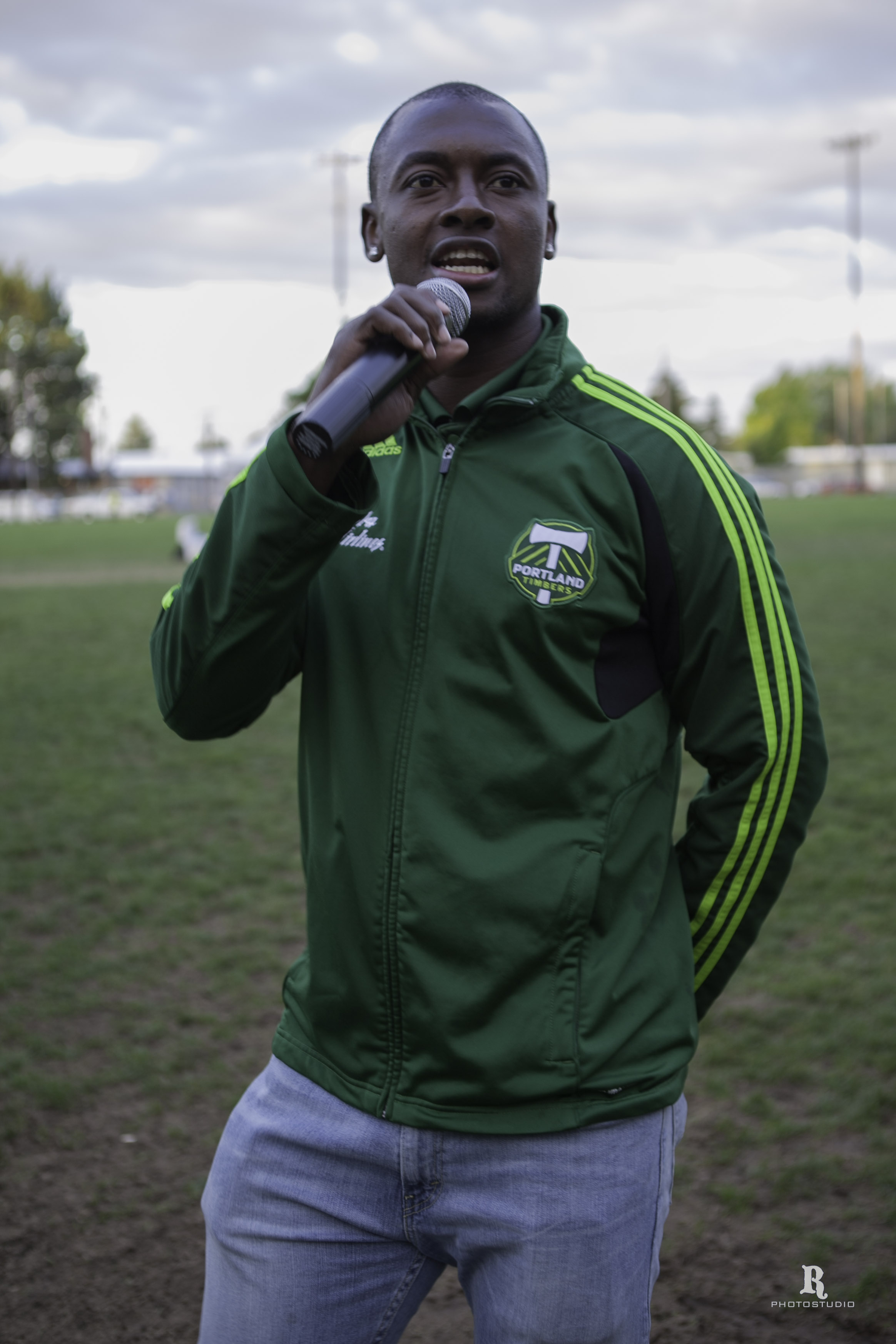

Personal information
- Full name: Hanyer Luis Mosquera Córdoba
- Date of birth: January 15, 1987 (age 39)
- Place of birth: Istmina, Colombia
- Height: 6 ft 1 in (1.85 m)
- Position: Centre back

Team information
- Current team: Cúcuta Deportivo
- Number: 35

Youth career
- Centauros Villavicencio

Senior career*
| Years | Team | Apps | (Gls) |
| 2006–2007 | Centauros Villavicencio | 36 | (3) |
| 2007–2010 | Deportes Quindío | 74 | (4) |
| 2010 | → La Equidad (loan) | 19 | (0) |
| 2011 | La Equidad | 34 | (2) |
| 2012–2013 | Portland Timbers | 26 | (0) |
| 2013–2014 | Once Caldas | 11 | (1) |
| 2014–2019 | Rionegro Águilas | 127 | (5) |
| 2019 | Ayacucho | 5 | (0) |
| 2020– | Cúcuta Deportivo | 5 | (0) |
- * Club domestic league appearances and goals as of 19:55, 9 May 2020 (UTC)

Hanyer Luis Mosquera Córdoba (born January 15, 1987) is a Colombian footballer who currently plays for Cúcuta Deportivo.

== Career ==
Mosquera began his youth career with Centauros Villavicencio and made his first team debut with the club in 2006. After two seasons with Centauros he signed with Primera A club Deportes Quindío and remained at the club until 2010. Mosquera quickly established himself as a first team starter for Quindío. For the second half of the 2010 season he was loaned to La Equidad. Mosquera continued as a regular starter for his new club and also played for La Equidad in the 2011 Copa Sudamericana. On August 19, 2011, he helped lead his club to a 2–0 victory over Peru's Juan Aurich, scoring the game's opening goal in the Copa Sudamericana match.

In January 2012 it was reported that Mosquera was close to signing with top Colombian club Millonarios, however Mosquera decided against the offer and began negotiating to join a club in Major League Soccer (MLS). The Portland Timbers of MLS announced the signing of Mosquera on January 17, 2012.

Mosquera was released by Portland on May 15, 2013.
