= Sebastián Rincón =

Colombian footballer (born 1994)

Personal information
- Full name: Sebastián Rincón Lucumí
- Date of birth: 14 January 1994 (age 32)
- Place of birth: Cali, Colombia
- Height: 6 ft 1 in (1.85 m)
- Positions: Right winger; forward

Team information
- Current team: Calicut
- Number: 9

Youth career
- 2004–2006: Deportivo Cali
- 2007–2009: Weston Fury

Senior career*
| Years | Team | Apps | (Gls) |
| 2010–2011 | Santa Fe | 0 | (0) |
| 2011–2013 | CA Atenas | 0 | (0) |
| 2012–2013 | → Portland Timbers (loan) | 0 | (0) |
| 2013 | → Portland Timbers 2 (loan) | 13 | (2) |
| 2014–2017 | Tigre | 75 | (12) |
| 2017–2020 | Vitória Guimarães | 13 | (1) |
| 2019–2020 | → Aldosivi (loan) | 18 | (3) |
| 2021 | Sarmiento | 6 | (0) |
| 2021–2022 | Huracán | 7 | (0) |
| 2022 | Barracas Central | 12 | (1) |
| 2023 | Panevėžys | 28 | (6) |
| 2024–2025 | Naft Al-Wasat | | |
| 2025– | Calicut | 7 | (3) |
- * Club domestic league appearances and goals as of 14 December 2025

Sebastián Rincón Lucumí (born 14 January 1994) is a Colombian professional footballer who plays as a right winger or forward for Super League Kerala club Calicut.

== Career ==
Rincón started his professional career as a teenager in 2010 with Colombian first-division club Independiente Santa Fe, before moving to Uruguayan club CA Atenas.

Rincón was loaned to Major League Soccer team Portland Timbers on 16 April 2012.

Rincón made his professional debut on 30 May 2013 in a US Open Cup game against Wilmington Hammerheads. He would go on to earn 13 caps and 2 goals for USL Championship side Portland Timbers 2 during his tenure in Portland.

On 9 July 2021, Argentine club Huracán announced the signing of Rincón. On 6 February 2022, he moved to fellow league club, Barracas Central.

== Personal life ==
Rincón is the son of the Colombian international footballer Freddy Rincón, who played for European teams such as Real Madrid and Napoli, and also in the Colombia national team. He has a younger step brother, Andres Caceres, who plays for Miramar United Elite FC.
