= 2017 Dallas Cup =

2017 Dallas Cup (U-19 Supergroup)
Tournament details
- Country: United States
- Dates: 9–16 April
- Teams: 12

Final positions
- Champions: (United States) Dallas
- Runners-up: (Mexico) Monterrey

Tournament statistics
- Matches played: 21
- Goals scored: 60 (2.86 per match)

The 2017 Dallas Cup, known as the Dr Pepper Dallas Cup for sponsorship reasons, was the thirty-eighth edition of a youth football competition held in the United States. Competitions were held at every age from U-13 to U-19. The U-19 level also had an additional competition for elite teams, known as the Gordon Jago Supergroup.

== Gordon Jago Supergroup ==
=== Participants ===
Association	Team (Berth)
CONCACAF; 6 berths	(United States) Dallas
CONCACAF; 6 berths	(Mexico) Guadalajara
CONCACAF; 6 berths	(Mexico) Monterrey
CONCACAF; 6 berths	(United States) Real Salt Lake
CONCACAF; 6 berths	(Canada) Toronto
CONCACAF; 6 berths	(Mexico) UANL
CONMEBOL; 2 berths	(Brazil) Coritiba
CONMEBOL; 2 berths	(Brazil) Red Bull Brasil
UEFA; 4 berths	(Germany) Eintracht Frankfurt
UEFA; 4 berths	(England) Everton
UEFA; 4 berths	(Israel) Maccabi Haifa
UEFA; 4 berths	(England) Manchester United

Dallas Cup

=== Matches ===
==== Group A ====
Pos	Team	Pld	W	D	L	GF	GA	GD	Pts	Qualification
1	(Brazil) Coritiba	3	1	2	0	6	5	+1	5	Advance to knockout stage
2	(Mexico) Guadalajara	3	1	1	1	7	5	+2	4	
3	(England) Manchester United	3	1	1	1	5	6	−1	4	
4	(United States) Real Salt Lake	3	0	2	1	2	4	−2	2	

Source: Dallas Cup
April 9
13:30 UTC−05:00

Coritiba (Brazil)	1–1	(United States) Real Salt Lake
da Cunha 89'	Report	Shumov 90+2'

Richland College, Lake Highlands
April 9
18:30 UTC−05:00

Manchester United (England)	1–4	(Mexico) Guadalajara
	Report

Cotton Bowl, Fair Park

April 10
16:00 UTC−05:00

Real Salt Lake (United States)	1–3	(England) Manchester United
Virgen	Report	Bohui 27'; Olosunde; Gribbin

MoneyGram Park, Irving
April 10
16:00 UTC−05:00

Guadalajara (Mexico)	3–4	(Brazil) Coritiba
Haro 25', 76'; Muñoz 86'	Report	Vermudt 2'; Rocha 16'; da Cunha 58'; Machado 64'

Richland College, Lake Highlands

April 12
19:30 UTC−05:00

Manchester United (England)	1–1	(Brazil) Coritiba
Olosunde 33'	Report	Rocha 17'

Cotton Bowl, Fair Park
April 12
19:30 UTC−05:00

Guadalajara (Mexico)	0–0	(United States) Real Salt Lake
	Report

MoneyGram Park, Irving

==== Group B ====
Pos	Team	Pld	W	D	L	GF	GA	GD	Pts	Qualification
1	(United States) Dallas	3	2	1	0	7	1	+6	7	Advance to knockout stage
2	(Mexico) Monterrey	3	2	1	0	5	2	+3	7	Advance to knockout stage
3	(England) Everton	3	1	0	2	1	7	−6	3	
4	(Israel) Maccabi Haifa	3	0	0	3	1	4	−3	0	

Source: Dallas Cup
April 9
12:30 UTC−05:00

Everton (England)	0–5	(United States) Dallas
	Report; Report (Everton)	Brewer 18'; Pomykal 37'; Evans 57'; Quevedo 63'; Ferreira 66'

Cotton Bowl, Fair Park
April 11
13:30 UTC−05:00

Monterrey (Mexico)	2–1	(Israel) Maccabi Haifa
Machado 9', 90'	Report	Masarwa

MoneyGram Park, Irving

April 10
12:00 UTC−05:00

Maccabi Haifa (Israel)	0–1	(England) Everton
	Report; Report (Everton)	Brewster 40'

Richland College, Lake Highlands
April 10
18:00 UTC−05:00

Dallas (United States)	1–1	(Mexico) Monterrey
Ferreira 45'	Report; Report (Dallas)	Machado 64'

MoneyGram Park, Irving

April 12
17:00 UTC−05:00

Dallas (United States)	1–0	(Israel) Maccabi Haifa
Salas 60'	Report

MoneyGram Park, Irving
April 12
17:00 UTC−05:00

Everton (England)	0–2	(Mexico) Monterrey
	Report; Report (Everton)	Martínez 30'; González 52' (pen.)

Cotton Bowl, Fair Park

==== Group C ====
Pos	Team	Pld	W	D	L	GF	GA	GD	Pts	Qualification
1	(Mexico) UANL	3	2	1	0	6	3	+3	7	Advance to knockout stage
2	(Brazil) Red Bull Brasil	3	1	1	1	5	5	0	4	
3	(Canada) Toronto	3	1	1	1	3	4	−1	4	
4	(Germany) Eintracht Frankfurt	3	0	1	2	3	5	−2	1	

Updated to match(es) played on 12 April 2017. Source: Dallas Cup
April 9
11:30 UTC−05:00

Toronto (Canada)	2–1	(Brazil) Red Bull Brasil
Johnson 26', 57'	Report	Bocchio 90+1'

Richland College, Lake Highlands
April 9
15:00 UTC−05:00

UANL (Mexico)	2–1	(Germany) Eintracht Frankfurt
10'	Report	Zorba 78'

Cotton Bowl, Fair Park

April 10
14:00 UTC−05:00

Red Bull Brasil (Brazil)	2–2	(Mexico) UANL
Albuquerque 27'; Vieira 60'	Report	Bonilla 79'; Sánchez

Richland College, Lake Highlands
April 10
14:00 UTC−05:00

Eintracht Frankfurt (Germany)	1–1	(Canada) Toronto
Takahashi 4'	Report	Hundal 64'

MoneyGram Park, Irving

April 12
14:30 UTC−05:00

UANL (Mexico)	2–0	(Canada) Toronto
Bonilla 4'; Leal 63'	Report

MoneyGram Park, Irving
April 12
14:30 UTC−05:00

Eintracht Frankfurt (Germany)	1–2	(Brazil) Red Bull Brasil
	Report

Cotton Bowl, Fair Park

==== Knockout stage ====
Semi-finals
14 April – Toyota Stadium
(Mexico) Tigres	1
(Mexico) Monterrey	2
14 April – Toyota Stadium
(United States) Dallas	2
(Brazil) Coritiba	1

Final
16 April – Toyota Stadium
(United States) Dallas	2
(Mexico) Monterrey	1

Semi-finals

April 14
17:00 UTC−05:00

UANL (Mexico)	1–2	(Mexico) Monterrey
Augusto 19'	Report	Castill 33'; Gonza 82'

Toyota Stadium, Frisco
April 14
19:00 UTC−05:00

Dallas (United States)	2–1	(Brazil) Coritiba
Ferreira 80'; Pomykal 88'	Report	Romeu 87'

Toyota Stadium, Frisco

Final

April 16
18:00 UTC−05:00

Dallas (United States)	2–1	(Mexico) Monterrey
Pomykal 23'; Rodríguez 89'	Report	Amaro 82'

Toyota Stadium, Frisco

=== Media coverage ===
Market	Countries	Broadcast partner	Ref
International	195	DallasCup.com (selected games)	
United States	1	Spectrum Sports (English) (selected games); UDN (Spanish) (selected games)	
Total countries	195		
