= Alexander Santos =

Alexander, Alexandre, or Alex Santos may refer to:

- Alex Santos (newscaster) (born 1970), Filipino newscaster and reporter
- Alexandro da Silva Santos (born 1985), Brazilian striker
- Alexandre José Maria dos Santos (1924–2021), Mozambican Roman Catholic cardinal
- Alexandre Santos (football manager) (born 1976), Portuguese football manager
- Alessandro Santos (born 1977), Brazilian-born Japanese footballer, known as Alex
- Alex dos Santos (footballer) (born 1981), Brazilian football defender
- Alex Santos (footballer) (born 1993), Brazilian footballer
- Alex Santos (baseball) (born 2002), American baseball player
