= 2012 Dallas Cup =

Tournament details
- Country: United States
- Teams: 12

Final positions
- Champions: (Brazil) Coritiba FC
- Runner-up: (England) Manchester United

Tournament statistics
- Matches played: 21
- Goals scored: 66 (3.14 per match)

The 2012 Dallas Cup was the 33rd since its establishment. 12 teams participated in the tournament. The competition was sponsored by Dr Pepper.

== Participating teams ==
From AFC:

- (Japan) Kashiwa Reysol

From CONCACAF:

- (Mexico) Tigres
- Mexico
- (United States) Dallas Texans
- (United States) FC Dallas
- (United States) Santa Clara Sporting

From CONMEBOL:

- (Brazil) Coritiba FC
- (Bolivia) Bolívar

From UEFA:

- (England) Manchester United
- (England) Everton
- (France) Paris St Germain
- (Germany) Eintracht Frankfurt

== Standings ==
Teams qualified for next round
Teams eliminated from tournament

=== Group A ===
Team	Pld	W	D	L	GF	GA	GD	Pts
(England) Manchester United	3	3	0	0	8	2	+6	9
(United States) FC Dallas	3	2	0	1	4	2	+2	6
(Mexico) Tigres	3	1	0	2	2	2	0	3
(United States) Santa Clara Sporting	3	0	0	3	2	10	–8	0

April 1

Manchester United (England)	2–0	(United States) FC Dallas
W. Keane 10'; Keane 52'

April 2

Manchester United (England)	5–2	(United States) Santa Clara Sporting
Cole 8'; Keane 41'; Lingard 51', 80'; Thorpe 81'		A. Moran 5'; D. Moran 30'

April 2

Tigres (Mexico)	0–1	(United States) FC Dallas
		Top 37'

April 4

Santa Clara Sporting (United States)	0–3	(United States) FC Dallas
		Top 16', 72'; Bobby Edet 90'

April 4

Manchester United (England)	1–0	(Mexico) Tigres

April 5

Santa Clara Sporting (United States)	0–2	(Mexico) Tigres
		Martinez 6'; Castillo 48'

=== Group B ===
Team	Pld	W	D	L	GF	GA	GD	Pts
(Germany) Eintracht Frankfurt	3	2	0	1	4	4	0	6
(United States) Dallas Texans	3	1	1	1	4	3	+1	4
Mexico	3	1	1	1	2	2	0	4
(France) Paris St Germain	3	1	0	2	4	5	–1	3

April 4

Eintracht Frankfurt (Germany)	1–3	(United States) Dallas Texans
Ehlert 23'		Richardson 48'; Hill 65'; Brandon 86'

April 1

Paris St Germain (France)	1–2	Mexico
Gockard 32'		Raúl López 14'; Madrigal 36'

April 2

Paris St Germain (France)	1–2	(Germany) Eintracht Frankfurt
Abreu 5'		Asta 47'; Rummel 68'

April 2

Mexico	0–0	(United States) Dallas Texans

April 4

Mexico	0–1	(Germany) Eintracht Frankfurt

April 4

Paris St Germain (France)	2–1	(United States) Dallas Texans
Laristan 60'; Bikoya 82'		Reyes 58'

=== Group C ===
Team	Pld	W	D	L	GF	GA	GD	Pts
(Brazil) Coritiba FC	3	2	0	1	11	2	+9	6
(England) Everton Football Club	3	2	0	1	10	4	+6	6
(Japan) Kashiwa Reysol	3	1	1	1	6	8	–2	4
(Bolivia) Bolívar	3	0	1	2	1	14	–13	1

April 1

Coritiba FC (Brazil)	0–1	(England) Everton Football Club
		Barkley 2'

April 1

Kashiwa Reysol (Japan)	1–1	(Bolivia) Bolívar
Tairaku 43'		Isita 5'

April 2

Coritiba FC (Brazil)	7–0	(Bolivia) Bolívar
Nascimento 9'; Vivian 23', 86'; Santos 33', 45'; Moris 35'; Rocha 80'

April 2

Kashiwa Reysol (Japan)	4–3	(England) Everton Football Club
Tairaku 17', 39', 65'; Kawashima 71'		Barkley 4'; Forrester 20'; Lundstram 38'

April 4

Coritiba FC (Brazil)	4–1	(Japan) Kashiwa Reysol
Andrade 30'; Primão 53'; Vivian 77'; Antonio 88'		Nakagawa 14'

April 4

Everton Football Club (England)	6–0	(Bolivia) Bolívar
Hope 8', 18', 53'; Forrester 12', 27'; Barkley 22'

== Semifinal ==
April 2

Manchester United (England)	2–0	(England) Everton Football Club
Fornasier 13'; Lingard 90'

April 6

(Brazil) Coritiba FC	2–1	(Germany) Eintracht Frankfurt
Silva 8'; Andreade 49'		Ehlert 81'

== Championship ==
April 8

Manchester United (England)	1–2	(Brazil) Coritiba FC
Keane 72'		Alex Santos 7'; Vivian 66'

FC Dallas Park Stadium, Dallas

== Top scorer ==
Team	Player	Goals
(Brazil) Coritiba FC	José Vivian	4
(Japan) Kashiwa Reysol	Masato Tairaku	4
