= Jack Barmby =

English footballer (born 1994)

Personal information
- Full name: Jack Barmby
- Date of birth: 14 November 1994 (age 31)
- Place of birth: Harlow, England
- Height: 5 ft 10 in (1.78 m)
- Positions: Left-back; midfielder; striker

Youth career
- –2008: Hull City
- 2008–2013: Manchester United

Senior career*
Years	Team	Apps	(Gls)
2013–2014	Manchester United	0	(0)
2014	→ Hartlepool United (loan)	17	(5)
2014–2016	Leicester City	0	(0)
2015	→ Rotherham United (loan)	2	(0)
2015	→ Notts County (loan)	5	(0)
2016	→ Portland Timbers (loan)	19	(1)
2016	→ Portland Timbers 2 (loan)	1	(0)
2017–2018	Portland Timbers	11	(1)
2017–2018	→ Portland Timbers 2 (loan)	31	(7)
2019	San Antonio FC	32	(8)
2020	Phoenix Rising	9	(0)
Total		127	(22)

International career
2009–2010	England U16	4	(2)
2012	England U18	1	(0)
2012	England U19	4	(0)
2015	England U20	1	(0)
- * Club domestic league appearances and goals

Jack Barmby (born 14 November 1994) is an English former professional footballer who played as a midfielder.

== Early and personal life ==
Barmby was born in Harlow on 14 November 1994. He is the son of Nick Barmby and the grandson of Jeff Barmby, both former footballers.

== Club career ==
=== Manchester United ===
Barmby signed for Manchester United in 2008. In June 2009, Barmby was a part of the Manchester United under-15 squad that finished tenth place in the International Marveld Tournament in Groenlo, Netherlands. He made his first appearances for the reserves in February 2011, coming on as a substitute in the wins against Rochdale and Oldham Athletic respectively. In July 2011, Barmby was named in the 18-man squad for the 2011 Milk Cup tournament in Northern Ireland. He excelled at the tournament, scoring four goals in five games as United finished as runners-up. Barmby scored in every round of the 2011–12 FA Youth Cup as United reached the semi-finals. His efforts saw him shortlisted for the Jimmy Murphy Young Player of the Year award. In December 2012, Barmby was named in the 18-man under-19 squad for the NexLions Cup in Singapore. He played in both of United's games as they finished third in the tournament. Barmby was part of the United squad that went out at the group stages of the 2013 Dallas Cup in Texas, United States. On 23 May 2014, Manchester United announced that Barmby would be leaving the club to join Leicester City. He didn't make a senior appearance for the club in nearly six years at Old Trafford.

==== Hartlepool United (loan) ====
Barmby signed for League Two club Hartlepool United on a one-month loan deal on 23 January 2014. He made his debut two days later, coming on as a 79th minute substitute against York City, and scoring the second goal in the 2–0 win at Victoria Park. He made his first start on 1 February, playing 83 minutes in the 0–0 with Scunthorpe United. On 25 February, Hartlepool extended Barmby's loan spell for a further month. He scored in the 3–0 against Torquay United on 1 March, and again in the 2–1 defeat at Wycombe Wanderers a week later. Barmby's loan spell was extended yet again on 27 March, this time Hartlepool agreed a deal to keep him at the club until the end of the season. Barmby's last appearance for the club came against Plymouth Argyle on 26 April, he scored the equalising goal in the 1–1 draw at Home Park. Overall, he made 17 appearances for Hartlepool and scored five goals.

=== Leicester City ===
On 23 May 2014, Barmby signed for newly promoted Premier League club Leicester City on a two-year deal commencing from 1 July.

==== Rotherham United (loan) ====
On 8 January 2015, Barmby joined Championship side Rotherham United on a one-month loan deal. He made his debut two days later, playing 57 minutes in the 1–0 defeat at Brentford. He made one further appearance a week later in the 2–0 defeat against Bournemouth. On 6 February, Rotherham manager Steve Evans announced on the club's Twitter account that Barmby had returned to his parent club due to lack of starting opportunities.

==== Notts County (loan) ====
On 24 September 2015, Barmby joined League Two side Notts County on loan until 13 November. He made his debut two days later, coming on as a 60th-minute substitute in the 1–0 win against York City at Meadow Lane. Barmby made his first start on 3 October, he played the whole game in the 3–1 defeat at Leyton Orient. He made his Football League Trophy debut three days later in the 5–1 defeat at League One club Sheffield United. Barmby made his last appearance for The Magpies in 2–1 league win against Portsmouth on 31 October. Overall, he made 6 appearances for Notts County without managing to score any goals.

=== Portland Timbers ===
On 9 March 2016, Barmby joined MLS side Portland Timbers on a season-long loan. Barmby signed a deal to remain with the Timbers at the expiration of his Leicester contract.

Barmby was released by Portland on 10 December 2018.

=== San Antonio FC ===
On 24 December 2018, it was announced that Barmby would join USL Championship side San Antonio FC ahead of their 2019 season.

=== Phoenix Rising FC ===
Barmby signed with Phoenix Rising FC on 10 December 2019. Phoenix and Barmby mutually agreed to part ways in October 2020.

== International career ==
In October 2009, Barmby was called up to the England U16 squad for the 2009 Victory Shield match against Northern Ireland. In March 2010, U16s' manager Kenny Swain named Barmby in his 18-man squad for the Montaigu Tournament in France. He started in the final of the tournament against Portugal as England lost 3–1 in a penalty shoot-out.

In February 2012, Barmby was called up to the England U18 squad for the friendly against Poland.

In August 2012, Barmby was called up to the England U19 squad for the friendly against Germany. Barmby retained his place in the squad for the UEFA European U19 Championship qualifiers against Estonia, Faroe Islands, and Ukraine.

On 19 March 2015, Barmby was called up to the England U20 squad for the friendlies against Mexico and United States.

== Career statistics ==
=== Club ===
As of match played 28 September 2017

Appearances and goals by club, season and competition
Club	Season	League			National Cup		League Cup		Continental		Other		Total	
Club	Season	Division	Apps	Goals	Apps	Goals	Apps	Goals	Apps	Goals	Apps	Goals	Apps	Goals
Manchester United	2013–14	Premier League	0	0	0	0	0	0	0	0	–		0	0
Hartlepool United (loan)	2013–14	League Two	17	5	0	0	0	0	–		–		17	5
Leicester City	2014–15	Premier League	0	0	0	0	0	0	–		–		0	0
Leicester City	2015–16	Premier League	0	0	0	0	0	0	–		–		0	0
Leicester City	Total		0	0	0	0	0	0	-	-	-	-	0	0
Rotherham United (loan)	2014–15	Championship	2	0	0	0	0	0	–		–		2	0
Notts County (loan)	2015–16	League Two	5	0	0	0	0	0	–		1 (Note: Appearance(s) in Football League Trophy)	0	6	0
Portland Timbers (loan)	2016	MLS	8	1	2	0	–		3	0	–		13	1
Portland Timbers 2 (loan)	2016	USL	1	0	–		–		–		–		1	0
Portland Timbers	2017	MLS	10	1	0	0	–		–		–		10	1
Portland Timbers 2 (loan)	2017	USL	7	1	–		–		–		–		7	1
Career total			50	8	2	0	0	0	3	0	1	0	56	8
