= 2010 Dallas Cup =

Tournament details
- Country: United States
- Teams: 16

Final positions
- Champions: (Brazil) Cruzeiro
- Runner-up: (Mexico) Monterrey

Tournament statistics
- Matches played: 28

The 2010 Dallas Cup was the 31st since its establishment, 16 teams entered in the tournament. The competition was sponsored by Dr Pepper.

== Participating teams ==
From AFC:

- Japan U-19

From CONCACAF:

- (Canada) Vancouver Whitecaps
- (Costa Rica) Alajuelense
- Mexico U-20
- (Mexico) Monterrey
- (Mexico) Guadalajara
- (Mexico) UANL
- (United States) CZ Elite
- (United States) Dallas
- (United States) Dallas Texans
- United States U-20

From CONMEBOL:

- (Brazil) Cruzeiro

From UEFA:

- (England) Chelsea
- (England) Tottenham Hotspur
- (Germany) Eintracht Frankfurt
- (Germany) 1899 Hoffenheim

== Standings ==
Teams qualified for next round
Teams eliminated from tournament

=== Group A ===
Team	Pld	W	D	L	GF	GA	GD	Pts
(Mexico) Monterrey	2	2	0	0	5	1	+4	6
(England) Chelsea	2	1	0	1	4	3	+1	3
(Costa Rica) Alajuelense	2	1	0	1	1	3	–2	3
(United States) Dallas	2	0	0	2	3	6	–3	0

=== Group B ===
Team	Pld	W	D	L	GF	GA	GD	Pts
(Mexico) Guadalajara	2	2	0	0	8	2	+6	6
(Brazil) Cruzeiro	2	2	0	0	7	2	+5	6
(United States) CZ Elite	2	0	0	2	1	6	–5	0
(Germany) 1899 Hoffenheim	2	0	0	2	3	9	–6	0

=== Group C ===
Team	Pld	W	D	L	GF	GA	GD	Pts
Japan	3	1	1	1	6	6	0	4
(England) Tottenham Hotspur	2	1	1	0	3	2	+1	4
(Mexico) UANL	2	1	0	1	6	4	+2	3
(United States) Dallas Texans	2	0	0	2	2	6	–4	0

March 28

Japan	3–2	(Mexico) UANL
Usami 22'; Nagai 69'; Kiyotake 85'

March 29

Japan	1–1	(England) Tottenham Hotspur
Sugimoto 50'

March 31

Japan	2–3	(United States) Dallas Texans
Sugimoto 13'; Usami 26'

=== Group D ===
Team	Pld	W	D	L	GF	GA	GD	Pts
Mexico	2	2	0	0	3	1	+2	6
(Germany) Eintracht Frankfurt	2	1	0	1	4	2	+2	3
United States	2	1	0	1	1	1	0	3
(Canada) Vancouver Whitecaps	2	0	0	2	0	4	–4	0

== Semifinal ==
Home team	Score	Away team
(England) Tottenham	1–3	(Brazil) Cruzeiro
(Mexico) Monterrey Rayados	3–1	Mexico National Team

== Third place playoff ==
–

Pizza Hut Park, Dallas

== Championship ==
April 4
18:00 UTC-6

Monterrey Rayados (Mexico)	2–4	(Brazil) Cruzeiro

Pizza Hut Park, Dallas

== Top Scorer ==
Player	Club	Goals
