= 2011 Dallas Cup =

Tournament details
- Country: United States
- Teams: 16

Tournament statistics
- Matches played: 28

The 2011 Dallas Cup was the 32nd since its establishment. 16 teams participated in the tournament. The competition was sponsored by Dr Pepper.

== Participating teams ==
From AFC:

- Japan

From CONCACAF:

- (Canada) Vancouver Whitecaps
- (Costa Rica) L.D. Alajuelense
- (Costa Rica) C.S. Cartaginés
- (Mexico) Tigres de la UANL
- (Panama) Chorrillo F.C.
- (United States) FC Dallas
- (United States) Dallas Texans
- (United States) Houston Dynamo
- (United States) Real Salt Lake

From CONMEBOL:

- (Brazil) Corinthians Paulista
- (Brazil) Coritiba FC
- (Bolivia) Bolívar

From UEFA:

- (England) Arsenal Academy
- (Spain) FC Barcelona
- (Germany) Eintracht Frankfurt

== Standings ==
Teams qualified for next round
Teams eliminated from tournament

=== Group A ===
Team	Pld	W	D	L	GF	GA	GD	Pts
(England) Arsenal Academy	3	3	0	0	14	2	+12	9
(United States) Dallas Texans	3	1	1	1	6	9	–3	4
(Bolivia) Club Bolívar	3	1	0	2	3	5	–2	3
(Panama) Chorrillo F.C.	3	0	1	2	5	12	–7	1

April 17

Club Bolívar (Bolivia)	2–1	(Panama) Chorrillo F.C.

April 17

Arsenal Academy (England)	5–1	(United States) Dallas Texans

April 18

Arsenal Academy (England)	6–0	(Panama) Chorrillo F.C.
	Report

April 18

Club Bolívar (Bolivia)	0–1	(United States) Dallas Texans

April 20

Chorrillo F.C. (Panama)	4–4	(United States) Dallas Texans

April 20

Arsenal Academy (England)	3–1	(Bolivia) Club Bolívar

=== Group B ===
Team	Pld	W	D	L	GF	GA	GD	Pts
(United States) FC Dallas	3	3	0	0	8	2	+6	9
(Spain) FC Barcelona	3	2	0	1	7	6	+1	6
Japan	3	1	0	2	5	5	0	3
(Costa Rica) C.S. Cartaginés	3	0	0	3	3	10	–7	0

April 17

C.S. Cartaginés (Costa Rica)	1–3	Japan
43'	Report	Kondo 30', 64'; T. Miyamoto 38'

April 17

FC Barcelona (Spain)	1–3	(United States) FC Dallas

April 18

FC Barcelona (Spain)	2–1	Japan
23'; 90' (pen.)	Report	Mine 55'

April 18

C.S. Cartaginés (Costa Rica)	0–3	(United States) FC Dallas

April 20

FC Barcelona (Spain)	4–2	(Costa Rica) C.S. Cartaginés

April 20

Japan	1–2	(United States) FC Dallas
Soma 31' (pen.)	Report	6' (pen.); 61'

=== Group C ===
Team	Pld	W	D	L	GF	GA	GD	Pts
(Mexico) Tigres de la UANL	3	3	0	0	6	1	+5	9
(Brazil) Corinthians Paulista	3	1	0	2	6	5	+1	3
(United States) Real Salt Lake	3	1	0	2	4	7	–3	3
(Canada) Vancouver Whitecaps	3	1	0	2	3	6	–3	3

April 17

Corinthians Paulista (Brazil)	2–3	(Canada) Vancouver Whitecaps

April 17

Tigres de la UANL (Mexico)	3–1	(United States) Real Salt Lake

April 18

Corinthians Paulista (Brazil)	4–1	(United States) Real Salt Lake

April 18

Tigres de la UANL (Mexico)	2–0	(Canada) Vancouver Whitecaps

April 20

Vancouver Whitecaps (Canada)	0–2	(United States) Real Salt Lake

April 20

Corinthians Paulista (Brazil)	0–1	(Mexico) Tigres de la UANL

=== Group D ===
Team	Pld	W	D	L	GF	GA	GD	Pts
(Germany) Eintracht Frankfurt	3	2	1	0	9	2	+7	7
(Brazil) Coritiba FC	3	2	1	0	5	2	+3	7
(United States) Houston Dynamo	3	1	0	2	2	6	–4	3
(Costa Rica) L.D. Alajuelense	3	0	0	3	1	7	–6	0

April 17

Coritiba FC (Brazil)	2–0	(United States) Houston Dynamo

April 17

Eintracht Frankfurt (Germany)	4–0	(Costa Rica) L.D. Alajuelense

April 18

Coritiba FC (Brazil)	1–0	(Costa Rica) L.D. Alajuelense

April 18

Eintracht Frankfurt (Germany)	3–0	(United States) Houston Dynamo

April 20

L.D. Alajuelense (Costa Rica)	1–2	(United States) Houston Dynamo

April 20

Coritiba FC (Brazil)	2–2	(Germany) Eintracht Frankfurt

== Semifinal ==
April 22

Arsenal Academy (England)	0–2	(Germany) Eintracht Frankfurt

April 22

FC Dallas (United States)	0–5	(Mexico) Tigres de la UANL

== Championship ==
Due to inclement weather, the game was called off in the 65th minute and the two teams declared co-champions.

April 24

Eintracht Frankfurt (Germany)	1–1	(Mexico) Tigres de la UANL

Pizza Hut Park, Dallas

== Top Scorer ==
Player	Club	Goals
