= 2007 Dallas Cup =

Soccer tournament

Tournament details
- Country: United States

The 2007 Dallas Cup was the 28th since its establishment, 12 teams entering in the tournament. The competition was sponsored by Dr Pepper. São Paulo beat Chelsea 1–0 in the Championship and won the 2007 Dallas Cup.

== Standings ==
Teams qualified for next round
Teams eliminated from tournament

=== Bracket A ===
Team	Pld	W	D	L	GF	GA	GD	Pts
(Spain) Real Madrid	3	3	0	0	7	0	+7	9
(England) Southampton	3	2	0	1	7	5	+2	6
(Costa Rica) Saprissa	3	1	0	2	4	4	0	3
(United States) Solar SC	3	0	0	3	2	11	–9	0

=== Bracket B ===
Team	Pld	W	D	L	GF	GA	GD	Pts
(England) Chelsea	3	3	0	0	11	3	+8	9
(United States) Arsenal USA	3	2	0	1	6	6	0	6
(Mexico) Guadalajara	3	1	0	2	4	6	–2	3
(Japan) Takigawa Daini H.S.	3	0	0	3	4	10	–6	0

=== Bracket C ===
Team	Pld	W	D	L	GF	GA	GD	Pts
(Brazil) São Paulo	3	3	0	0	12	5	+7	9
(Mexico) UANL Tigres	3	2	0	1	7	5	+2	6
(Germany) Eintracht Frankfurt	3	1	0	2	4	6	–2	3
(Republic of Ireland) Shamrock Rovers	3	0	0	3	4	11	–7	0

== Semifinal ==
Home team	Score	Away team
Chelsea (England)	1–0	(England) Southampton
Real Madrid (Spain)	0–4	(Brazil) São Paulo

== Third place ==
April 7
19:30

Southampton (England)	2–1	(Spain) Real Madrid

Pizza Hut Park, Dallas

== Championship ==
April 8
18:00

Chelsea (England)	0–1	(Brazil) São Paulo

Pizza Hut Park, Dallas
