= 2009 Dallas Cup =

Tournament details
- Country: United States

The 2009 Dallas Cup will be the 30th since its establishment, 12 teams entering in the tournament. The competition is sponsored by Dr Pepper.

== Participating teams ==
From AFC:

- (Japan) Urawa Red Diamonds

From CONCACAF:

- (Canada) Toronto FC
- (Canada) Vancouver Whitecaps
- (Mexico) UANL Tigres
- (Mexico) Monterrey
- (United States) Andromeda
- (United States) Dallas Texans

From CONMEBOL:

- (Argentina) River Plate
- (Brazil) São Paulo

From UEFA:

- (England) Manchester City
- (Germany) Eintracht Frankfurt
- (Italy) Milan

== Standings ==
| Teams qualified for next round |
| Teams eliminated from tournament |

=== Group A ===
| Team | Pld | W | D | L | GF | GA | GD | Pts |
|---|---|---|---|---|---|---|---|---|
| (England) Manchester City | 3 | 3 | 0 | 0 | 11 | 2 | +9 | 9 |
| (Mexico) UANL Tigres | 3 | 1 | 1 | 1 | 5 | 5 | 0 | 4 |
| (Canada) Toronto FC | 3 | 1 | 1 | 1 | 4 | 5 | –1 | 4 |
| (Italy) Milan | 3 | 0 | 0 | 3 | 1 | 9 | –8 | 0 |

=== Group B ===
| Team | Pld | W | D | L | GF | GA | GD | Pts |
|---|---|---|---|---|---|---|---|---|
| (Germany) Eintracht Frankfurt | 3 | 2 | 1 | 0 | 12 | 3 | +9 | 7 |
| (Brazil) São Paulo | 3 | 2 | 1 | 0 | 9 | 1 | +8 | 7 |
| (Japan) Urawa Red Diamonds | 3 | 1 | 0 | 2 | 4 | 8 | –4 | 3 |
| (United States) Dallas Texans | 3 | 0 | 0 | 3 | 2 | 15 | –13 | 0 |

=== Ranking of second-placed teams ===
| Team | Pld | W | D | L | GF | GA | GD | Pts |
|---|---|---|---|---|---|---|---|---|
| (Brazil) São Paulo | 3 | 2 | 1 | 0 | 9 | 1 | +8 | 7 |
| (Mexico) UANL Tigres | 3 | 1 | 1 | 1 | 5 | 5 | 0 | 4 |
| (United States) Andromeda | 3 | 1 | 1 | 1 | 3 | 3 | 0 | 4 |

== Semifinal ==
| Home team | Score | Away team |
|---|---|---|
| Eintracht Frankfurt (Germany) | 0–2 | (Canada) Vancouver Whitecaps |
| Manchester City (England) | 0–0 (2–4 pen.) | (Brazil) São Paulo |

== Third place playoff ==
April 11
18:30 UTC-6

| Eintracht Frankfurt (Germany) | 2–1 | (England) Manchester City |

Pizza Hut Park, Dallas

== Championship ==
April 12
18:00 UTC-6

| Vancouver Whitecaps (Canada) | 0–4 | (Brazil) São Paulo |

Pizza Hut Park, Dallas

== Top Scorer ==
| Player | Club | Goals |
