= Dallas Cup =

- Founded: 1980
- Region: International
- Current champions: Botafogo (2025)
- Most championships: (Mexico) Tigres UANL 4 titles (Supergroup)
- 2024 Dallas Cup

The Dallas Cup is an annual international football tournament for invited youth teams. The tournament was established in 1980 and is held in Dallas, Texas, with FC Dallas serving as its host club. Venues used for the tournament include the Cotton Bowl and Toyota Stadium. The Dallas Cup includes divisions ranging from U-12 to U-19 in the Boys' tournament and U-15 through U-19 in the Dallas Cup Girls' Invitational presented by Mary Kay, which features girls' age groups. The Botafogo is the current champion of the elite U19 Gordon Jago Super Group. The first ever Dallas Cup saw an English club side from South London, St. Thomas More, win the U14 cup and elite international competition has been a cornerstone for the tournament ever since.

== List of Champions ==
Following is the list with the main U-19 category champions by year:

=== Group A U-19 ===
Year	Champion	Country
1980	Texas Longhorns	United States
1981	Royal Navy	England
1982	Lagos Stars	Nigeria
1983	NSL Selects	Canada
1984	NSL Selects	Canada
1985	Trebor Lions	Nigeria
1986	Dallas Comets	United States
1987	Tahuichi	Bolivia
1988	Tahuichi	Bolivia
1989	Tahuichi	Bolivia
2024	Dallas Texans	United States

=== Supergroup U-19 ===
The elite U19 Super Group was founded in 1990.

Year	Champion	Country
1990	Tahuichi	Bolivia
1991	Dynamo Moscow	Russia
1992	West Ham United	England
1993	Real Madrid	Spain
1994	Real Madrid	Spain
1995	São Paulo	Brazil
1996	Vitória	Brazil
1997	Vitória	Brazil
1998	San Lorenzo	Argentina
1999	Corinthians	Brazil
2000	Corinthians	Brazil
2001	Pumas UNAM	Mexico
2002	Nottingham Forest	England
2003	Tigres UANL	Mexico
2004	Atlético Paranaense	Brazil
2005	Atlético Paranaense	Brazil
2006	Dallas Texans	United States
2007	São Paulo	Brazil
2008	Liverpool	England
2009	São Paulo	Brazil
2010	Cruzeiro	Brazil
2011	Eintracht Frankfurt	Germany
2011	Tigres UANL	Mexico
2012	Coritiba	Brazil
2013	Fulham	England
2014	River Plate	Argentina
2015	Coritiba	Brazil
2016	Everton	England
2017	FC Dallas	United States
2018	Tigres UANL	Mexico
2019	Tigres UANL	Mexico
2020	Cancelled due to COVID-19 pandemic	
2021	Supergroup U-19 Not held	
2022	Panama U-20	Panama
2023	Midtjylland	Denmark
2024	São Paulo	Brazil
2025	Botafogo	Brazil

== Titles by team ==
Team	Country
4 titles
Tahuichi	Bolivia
Tigres UANL	Mexico
São Paulo	Brazil
2 titles
Atlético Paranaense	Brazil
Corinthians	Brazil
NSL Select	Canada
Real Madrid	Spain
Vitória	Brazil
Coritiba	Brazil
1 title
Botafogo	Brazil
Comets	United States
Cruzeiro	Brazil
Dallas Texans	United States
Dynamo Moscow	Russia
Eintracht Frankfurt	Germany
Everton	England
FC Dallas	United States
Fulham	England
Lagos Stars	Nigeria
Liverpool	England
Midtjylland	Denmark
Nottingham Forest	England
Panama U-20	Panama
Pumas UNAM	Mexico
Royal Navy	England
River Plate	Argentina
San Lorenzo	Argentina
Texas Longhorns	United States
Trebor Lions	Nigeria
West Ham United	England

== Titles by country ==
Country
14 titles
Brazil
6 titles
England
5 titles
Mexico
4 titles
Bolivia
United States
2 titles
Argentina
Canada
Nigeria
Spain
1 title
Denmark
Germany
Panama
Russia

== Notable players ==
Players that participated in the Dallas Cup who later played on professional teams and national teams

Alumni Player	Most Recent Professional Team	National Team
Freddy Adu	Las Vegas Lights	USA
Jeff Agoos	MetroStars	USA
Folarin Balogun	Arsenal	USA
Adolfo Bautista	Tepic	Mexico
DaMarcus Beasley	Houston Dynamo	USA
David Beckham	Paris Saint-Germain	England
Vincenzo Bernardo	Miami Fusion	USA
Michael Bradley	Toronto FC	USA
John O'Brien	Chivas USA	USA
Salvador Carmona	Cruz Azul	Mexico
Michael Carrick	Manchester United	England
José de Jesús Corona	Cruz Azul	Mexico
Bobby Convey	New York Red Bulls	USA
Fábio Costa	Santos FC	Brazil
Peter Crouch	Stoke City	England
Duilio Davino	Estudiantes	Mexico
Jermain Defoe	Sunderland	England
Allan Dellon	Brasiliense	
Clint Dempsey	Seattle Sounders	USA
Landon Donovan	LA Galaxy	USA
Edmílson	Ceará	Brazil
Edu	Corinthians	Brazil
Ewerthon	Atlético Sorocaba	Brazil
Gerardo Galindo	Estudiantes de Altamira	Mexico
Gil	Corinthians	Brazil
Ian Harte	AFC Bournemouth	Ireland
Pierre Ibarra	Correcaminos UAT	
Martin Kelly	Crystal Palace	England
Harry Kewell	Melbourne Heart	Australia
Ledley King	Tottenham Hotspur	England
Kléber	Coritiba	Brazil
Israel López	Toluca	Mexico
Jaime Lozano	Morelia	Mexico
Luisão	Benfica	Brazil
Braulio Luna	Atlético San Luis	Mexico
Maicon	Botafogo	Brazil
Mike Magee	Chicago Fire	USA
Rafael Márquez	Club Atlas	Mexico
Brian McBride	Chicago Fire	USA
Alberto Medina	Puebla	Mexico
Hakeem Olajuwon	Lagos Stars	
Oguchi Onyewu	Philadelphia Union	USA
Diego Ordaz	C.F. Monterrey	
Michael Owen	Stoke City	England
Luis Perez	C.F. Monterrey	Mexico
Gonzalo Pineda	Seattle Sounders	Mexico
Raul	New York Cosmos	Spain
Francisco Rodríguez	Cruz Azul	Mexico
Óscar Rojas	Club América	Mexico
Wayne Rooney	Derby County	England
Rubinho	Corinthians	Brazil
Bukayo Saka	Arsenal	England
Schumacher	Académica	
Jonathan Spector	Orlando City	USA
Gerardo Torrado	Cruz Azul	Mexico
James Ward-Prowse	Southampton	England
Matheus Cunha	Manchester United	Brazil
