= 2016 Portland Timbers season =

Portland Timbers
2016 season
- President: Merritt Paulson
- Head coach: Caleb Porter
- Stadium: Providence Park; Portland, Oregon (Capacity: 21,144)
- Major League Soccer: Conference: 7th Overall: 12th
- U.S. Open Cup: Round of 16
- CONCACAF Champions League: Group stage
- Top goalscorer: League: Fanendo Adi (16); All: Fanendo Adi (18)
- Highest home attendance: Regular season: 21,144 (Multiple games; capacity); Open Cup: 21,144 (Jun. 15 vs. San Jose; capacity); CCL: 16,977 (Oct. 19 vs. Deportivo Saprissa)
- Lowest home attendance: Regular season: 21,144 (Multiple games; capacity); Open Cup: 18,164 (Jun. 29 vs. LA Galaxy); CCL: 16,268 (Aug. 3 vs. C.D. Dragón)
- Average home league attendance: Regular season: 21,144; Open Cup: 19,654; CCL: 16,268
- Biggest win: 4–0 (Feb. 21 vs. Minnesota United FC)
- Biggest defeat: 1–4; 2 Matches
Primary colors	Secondary colors

The 2016 Portland Timbers season was the sixth season for the Portland Timbers in Major League Soccer (MLS), the top-flight professional soccer league in the United States and Canada. The Timbers began this season as 2015 MLS Cup champions, but failed to qualify for the 2016 playoffs after a 4–1 away defeat to Vancouver Whitecaps FC on the final league day, also resulting in them failing to win the Cascadia Cup.

== Season review ==
=== March ===
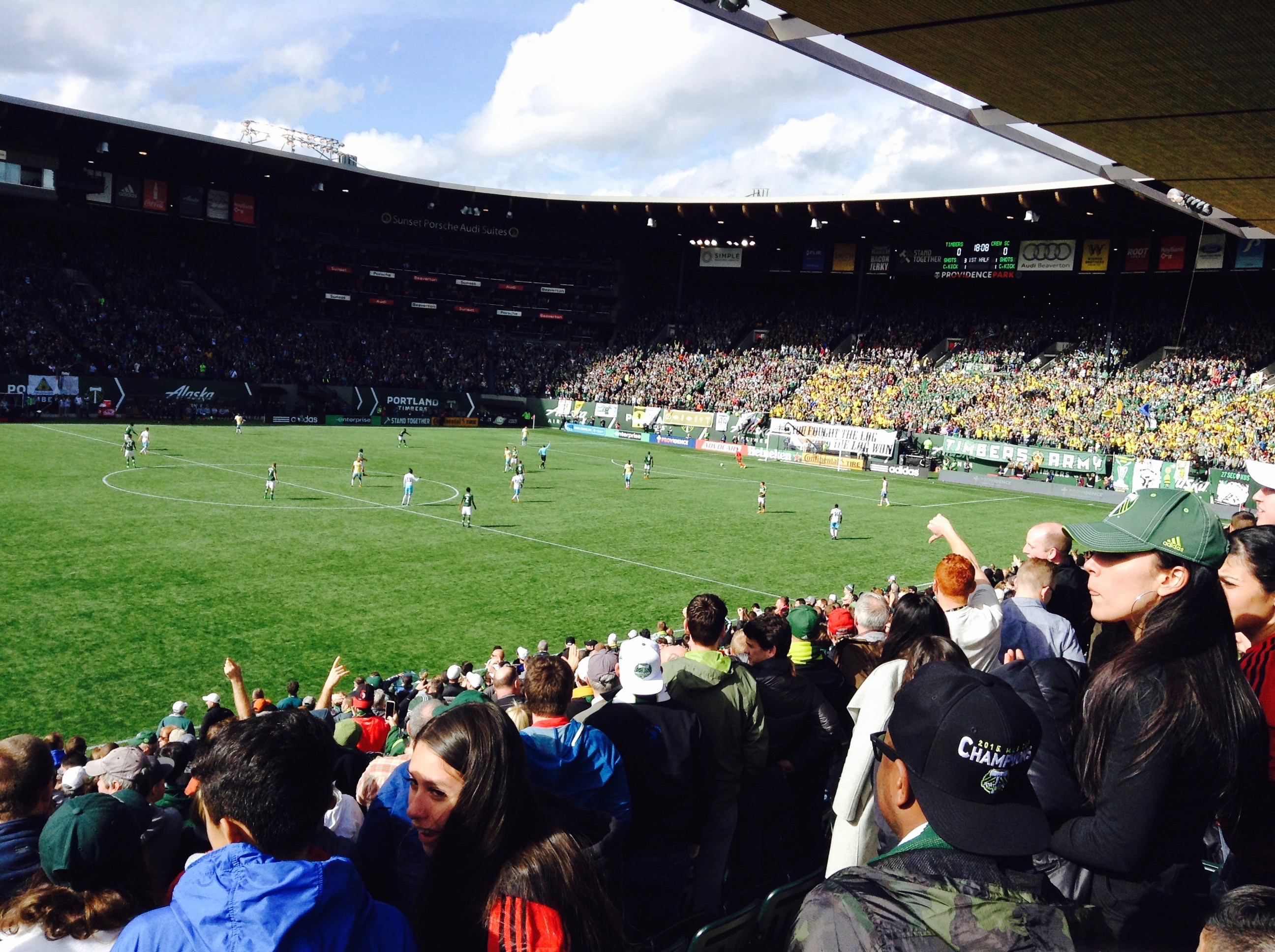
2016 home opener, Portland Timbers vs. Columbus Crew at Providence Park, March 6, 2016

The reigning champions started their season against Columbus Crew SC. It was the fourth consecutive home opener being the first match of the season for the Timbers. As it has been since 2011, the Timbers Army led the national anthem and raised a tifo remembering the MLS Cup final victory with the words "Kiss. Dance. Love. You always remember your first." The Timbers were able to start strong with Valeri making the first goal in the 23rd minute from a free kick just outside the 18-yard box. Columbus would soon return the blow with a goal that came out of nothing. In the 68th minute, Higuaín was able to control the ball that lightly bounced off of Taylor's back and finish with a bicycle kick to equalize Columbus Crew SC. The Timbers answered in the 79th minute with a goal from Adi, who recovered the deflection from goalkeeper Steve Clark that blocked Asprilla's low shot. The Timbers won, 2–1.

The Timbers felt the loss of Liam Ridgewell who was ruled out with a hamstring injury shortly before the San Jose away match. Jermaine Taylor would be moved into the center back position due to Ridgewell's injury and give Zack Valentin his first start for the Timbers as he filled Taylor's position at left back. The Timber's would fall 2–1 with a late goal from substitute Jack McInerney.

Jack Barmby was announced to join the Timbers on loan from Leicester City and Darren Mattocks was signed from Vancouver Whitecaps FC.

The Timbers faced off with Real Salt Lake at home for a 2–2 draw. Despite playing against a 9-man Salt Lake squad, out-shooting them 26–7, and having 17 corners to their 4, the Timbers were unable to steal the victory and had to settle for the draw. Darren Mattocks was subbed in during this match, making it his first match since joining the Timbers. Fanendo Adi was the lone scorer, putting the ball in the back of the net in the 79th minute and converted a penalty in the 84th minute.

Position at the end of March

Pos	Team	Pld	W	D	L	GF	GA	GD	Pts
8	Portland Timbers	3	1	1	1	5	5	0	4

=== April ===
The Timbers started April on the road in Orlando, Florida, as they faced the current top team in the Eastern Conference, Orlando City FC. The team continued to tinker with the left back position, this time starting Jack Barmby instead of Valentin, giving Barmy his first start and appearance for the Timbers. The Timbers would suffer a harsh defeat of 4–1 with Fanendo Adi's penalty being blocked and allowing Orlando to convert their penalty. Jack McInerney was able to perform a late goal again, preventing Orlando's shutout.

The Timbers continued their search for a win on the road, this time against LA Galaxy. Chris Klute returned to the first team from Timbers 2, getting his first appearance as the squad continued to find a replacement for the left back position. The Timbers also changed their formation for this match from a 4–3–3 to a 4–2–3–1 putting Jack Jewsbury with Chara in the defensive midfielder positions. in the 52nd minute, Diego Valeri was able to send the ball to Fanendo Adi who managed a nice angle shot to send the ball inside the far end of the net. In the 74th minute, the Darlington Nagbe had to be carried off the pitch and return to the locker room via wheelchair due to a serious foul by Nigel de Jong to the ankle, who managed to escape with only a yellow card. Later on during the week, the MLS Disciplinary Committee would rule it was a red and de Jong was handed a 3-game suspension. Nagbe would later be ruled with an ankle sprain, contusion. Unfortunately, the Timbers would have to settle for the draw due to an own goal from Nat Borchers in the 83rd minute, continuing the Timbers search for a win on the road.

The Timbers continued their busy week, this time going against FC Dallas on a rainy Wednesday evening, 3 days after their draw with LA. This would be the first time the Timbers would have to play against a former player, Maximiliano Urruti. The Timbers would feel his presence as he made two key turnovers to give FC Dallas 2 goals, although he would not score any himself. Darren Mattocks prevented FC Dallas' clean sheet by scoring in the 67th minute, giving him his first goal as a Timber player. The Timbers fell 3–1 to FC Dallas.

The Timbers played their 3rd and final match of the week, taking a victory at home against San Jose Earthquakes. Jack McInerney got his first start and scored the first goal of the match in the 52nd minute. Fanendo Adi followed with two more goals in the 65th and 90th+9 minute. Diego Valeri would eventually get a 2nd yellow for kicking the ball away and accidentally hitting Anibal Goody in the face.

For their final match of April, the Timbers traveled to New England. Still plagued with injuries and a red card suspension, the Timbers had to make some new roster changes for this match. The Timbers switched to a 4–4–2, starting Jake Gleeson for an injured Kawarsey and Jewsbury would stand in for a suspended Valeri. Nagbe and Asprilla made their returns for this match. At the 61st minute, the Timbers subbed in Jack Barmby as a forward and scored 3 minutes later as his shot deflected on the ground hard and chipped over the keeper. In the 89th minute, Jermaine Taylor sent the ball into his own net, leveling New England. The final score was 1–1 giving the Timbers a point on the road and still looking for their first clean sheet of the season.

Position at the end of April

Pos	Team	Pld	W	D	L	GF	GA	GD	Pts
8	Portland Timbers	8	2	3	3	12	15	−3	9

=== May ===
The Timbers started off May with a match at home against Toronto FC. It was the first time the Timbers would play against former midfielder and Portland favorite, Will Johnson. Adi would score early in the 17th minute with assists from Valeri and Mattocks. Right before the half, at the 40th minute, Will Johnson was able to shoot a low rocket into the back of the net. He had a moment of excitement but then proceeded to not celebrate against his former club. The Timbers would win it as the final goal was struck by Diego Valeri, which also happened to be his birthday that day, from a free kick around 22 yards out. With the help of backup goalkeeper, Jake Gleeson, who made 4 amazing saves, the Timbers would take 3 points at home with a 2–1 win.

For their first Cascadia match of the year, the Timbers traveled to Canada to face Vancouver Whitecaps FC. The Timbers were able to strike first with Nat Borchers who had a beautiful setup from Darlington Nagbe and Fanendo Adi. Vancouver would later answer back with two goals, sealing the win at 2–1 and remaining undefeated in the Cascadia Cup.

The Timbers took on New York City FC for the first time at Providence Park. Adi was able to score another goal, moving his top scorer record to 8 for the 2016 season. The Timbers would fall 2–1 in the end, extending their losing streak to 3.

The Timbers finished off their month of May, traveling to Bridgeview, Illinois to face the Chicago Fire. Valeri sent one to the back of the net in the 18th minute, but two minutes later, Chicago equalized with DP, David Accam. Both teams would settle for a point and the Timbers continue to look for their first win on the road.

Position at the end of May

Pos	Team	Pld	W	D	L	GF	GA	GD	Pts
8	Portland Timbers	14	4	4	6	22	25	−3	16

=== June ===
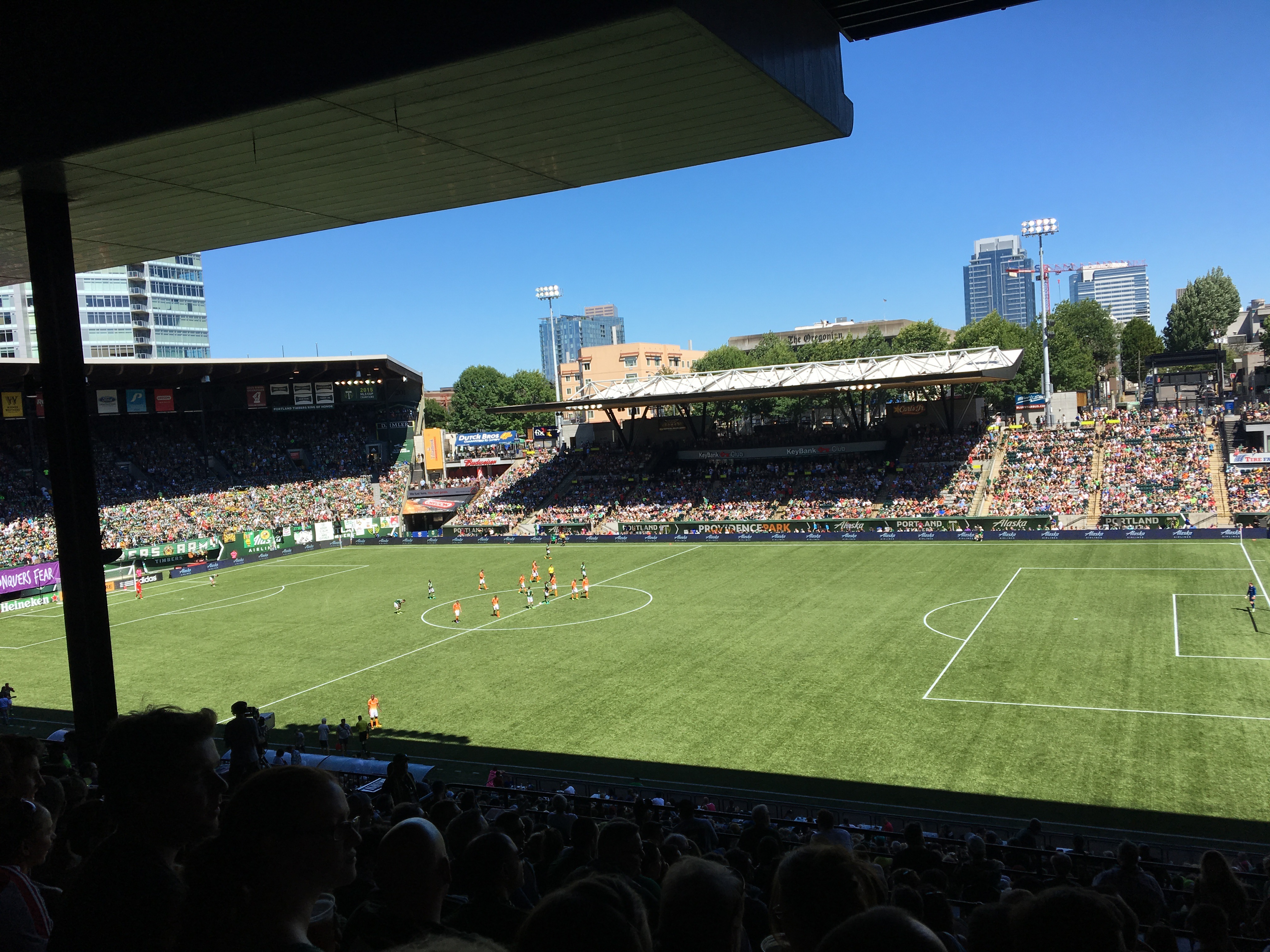
Timbers playing Dynamo, June 26, 2016

The Timbers started the month of June back home against San Jose Earthquakes. Liam Ridgewell was the lone scorer by a header from Diego Valeri's free kick outside the 18 yard box. In extra time in the first half, the Timbers would lose Dairon Asprilla to a red card from an elbow to the face. The Timbers were also able to clutch their first clean sheet with Jake Gleeson protecting the net and having only 10 men for the 2nd half.

The Timbers entered the 102nd U.S. Open Cup at home against San Jose Earthquakes, who the team recently defeated at the start of the month in regular MLS season play. Dairon Asprilla would manage to score first from a shot that rolled out of the hands of goal keeper Bryan Meredith. Jack McInerney would follow up shortly with a second goal from a free kick a bit past the 18-yard box. The Timbers would go on to win 2–0, giving Jake Gleeson his second clean sheet of the year. During the fifth round draw, The Timbers drew LA Galaxy at Providence Park. The winner of that match would then go to host the quarterfinals of the U.S. Open Cup.

The Timbers went on their only away match for this month to Salt Lake City to face off against Real Salt Lake. Fanendo Adi would score, raising his count this year to nine goals with an assist from Jermaine Taylor. Lucas Melano was able to score his first goal of the season. The Timber's would tie Salt Lake 2–2.

The Timber's played their final June league match at home against Houston Dynamo. Playing in 87(°F) degree weather, the Timbers fell behind two goals in the 28th and 30th minute. At the 2nd half, the Timbers would rally back with a goal from Lucas Melano, assisted by Diego Valeri in the 63rd minute. Diego Valeri was gifted a penalty at the 82nd minute which he successfully converted. Finally near the final whistle, at the 90+1 minute, Diego Valeri was given another penalty shot and successfully sent the ball to the back of the net, completing the Timber's comeback and collecting all 3 points.

The Timbers would be eliminated from the U.S. Open Cup, following a 0–1 loss to LA Galaxy.

Position at the end of June

Pos	Team	Pld	W	D	L	GF	GA	GD	Pts	Qualification
5	Portland Timbers	17	6	5	6	28	29	−1	23	Knockout Round

=== July ===
The Timbers start their month of July on the road against Colorado Rapids, who would be starting veteran USA goalkeeper, Tim Howard for the first time. The Timbers were without Diego Valeri and Liam Ridgewell, however, both sides were able to keep a clean sheet and ended the match 0-0.

Continuing their 6-match unbeaten streak, the Timbers traveled to New York to face the Red Bulls. Still without Adam Kawarsey and Diego Valeri, the Timbers held a clean sheet with New York at 0–0, giving both teams a point and raising the Timber's unbeaten streak to 7.

After a very short break, the Timbers returned home to face Montreal Impact. With both sides still missing key players such as Diego Valeri for the Timbers and Didier Drogba for the Impact, both sides would fight for a draw with Jack McInerney being the lone scorer for the Timbers. This put the Timbers to 8 games without a loss.

For the first time this year, the Timbers met with their main rivals, Seattle Sounders FC at home. Diego Valeri would return from his injury and capture a brace in the 44th and 50th minute with one being assisted by Lucas Melano and the other by Jermaine Taylor. Chad Marshall of Seattle Sounders FC would give them one goal; however, Fanendo Adi would put the Timbers back up by two with a goal in the 64th minute, assisted by Melano. The Timbers would win 3–1 and putting them currently in first place for the Cascadia Cup by goal differentials.

Attempting to continue to their undefeated streak, the Timbers went against LA Galaxy at home. LA was without Steven Gerrard and the Timbers without Liam Ridgewell. The Galaxy were able to take a commanding lead with goals from Robbie Keane in the 7th minute and Gyasi Zardes in the 11th minute. Zarek Valentin, assisted by Darlington Nagbe, was able to give the Timbers a goal before the end of the half. Shortly after, Nat Borchers would suffer an Achilles tendon injury that would leave him out for the remainder of the season. In the end, the Timbers would fall 2–1 and ending their streak at 9.

Portland went on the road for the final time for the month and a start to a back to back match of home and away against Sporting Kansas City. The Timbers were table to hold the score 0–0 at the half, but a goal from Jacob Peterson off of a free kick from Benny Feilhaber. The Timbers would take another loss as they prepare for CONCACAF Champions League Group play starting mid week.

Position at the end of July

Pos	Team	Pld	W	D	L	GF	GA	GD	Pts
7	Portland Timbers	23	7	8	8	33	34	−1	29

=== August ===
For their 2nd time in MLS history, the Timbers began their play in the CONCACAF Champions League. Their first match in group B was at home against Club Deportivo Dragón. The Timbers struck first with a goal from Jack McInerney in the 21st minute from a light touch from Diego Valeri's pass. Dragón would answer back in the 76th minute with a goal from Kenroy Howell. Finally, in the 90th minute, Adi was able to take a header that hit the crossbar. Valeri was able to capture the rebound and take a shot that deflected off multiple players of C.D. Dragón and slowly roll slightly pass the line, sealing the Timber's victory, 2–1.

The Timber's completed their first home/away back to back match, this time at home versus Sporting Kansas City. Vytautas Andriuškevičius started his first MLS league match and played in his natural left fullback position. The Timber's lost a man early with Diego Chará getting a straight red, however, 32 minutes later, Sporting Kansas City's Soni Mustivar would also be shown a straight red card, making it an even 10-man match. During the second half, the Timber's would burst to life with an amazing goal from Diego Valeri in the 65th minute that was taken from a bounce off the pitch. Near the end of the match, Jack Jewsbury would score a howler in the 87th minute from a burdened Darlington Nagbe who was able to complete the pass having dealt with two defenders attacking him. Finally, Fanendo Adi would seal the victory with a goal in final minutes of the match. The Timbers were able to get revenge from last week and again move into playoff positioning at 6th place.

The Timber's traveled to the District of Columbia where they fell 0–2 to D.C. United.

The Timbers traveled north to face their main rivals, Seattle Sounders FC. Both teams were able to keep it 0–0 at the half but at the 61st minute, Clint Dempsey was awarded a penalty from a clip from Vytautas Andriuskevicius. The Sounders would convert and make it 1–0. In the 80th minute, Dempsey was able to capture a brace from an assist from Cristian Roldan who would also score in the 83rd minute, putting Seattle up 3–0. Fanendo Adi, who did not start due to a report of the player missing the team plane as punishment, was able to score the last goal and prevent a shut out from Seattle in added time. The Timbers would fall 1–3 to their rivals who they will meet again next week.

For the final time during regular season play, the Timbers went against their main rivals, Seattle Sounders at home. The Sounders would be without Clint Dempsey after he was diagnosed with an irregular heartbeat earlier in the week. Looking for revenge from last week's loss, the Timbers were able to provide a dominant first half, scoring 4 goals and keeping Seattle quiet until the second half. The first goal in the 16th minute was a header by Vytas, assisted by Jack Jewsbury. The ball took a deflection off an attempted save from Stefan Frei, hitting the top crossbar, and crossed the line before rolling back out. The 2nd goal was in the 29th minute by Fanendo Adi from a saved shot from Diego Valeri and send the ball into the back of the net. In the 29th minute, Lucas Melano captured a goal after passing the ball to Valeri, then sent to Chara, then back to Melano to complete the assists. On his 2nd start, Steven Taylor would get a quick header from a set piece from Valeri. This would be Taylor's first goal with the Timbers. Seattle would manage to get two goals in the 2nd half. One from Andreas Ivanschitz, assisted by Nicolas Lodeiro in the 47th minute and one by Jordan Morris in the 51st minute, assisted by Ivanschitz and Lodeiro. The Timbers would hold on to collect 3 points from a final score of 4–2.

Position at the end of August

Pos	Team	Pld	W	D	L	GF	GA	GD	Pts	Qualification
6	Portland Timbers	27	9	8	10	41	41	0	35	Knockout Round

=== September ===
The Timbers traveled to Frisco, Texas to attempt to get their first road win of the season that they still desperately seek. The Timbers, without Darlington Nagbe or Alvas Powell due to call-ups for national team play, went against FC Dallas who lost 5 starters due to national competition as well. The Timbers gave up an early penalty to FC Dallas in the 14th minute, taken and scored by Mario Díaz. Dallas would score again in added time of the first half, this time a goal to Victor Ulloa, putting Dallas up 2–0. In the 53rd minute, Dallas would put themselves comfortably in the lead again with a goal from Walker Zimmerman, assisted by Mario Díaz. The Timbers would be able to prevent a shut out with a goal from Diego Valeri in the 87th minute, assisted by Zarek Valentin; however, it would not be enough and the Timbers still look for a road win with only 3 more away matches left in regular season play.

On September 7, 2016, Chris Klute was loaned out to Minnesota United FC until the remainder of the season.

On September 10, the Timbers hosted Real Salt Lake in a crucial match that would keep them fully in control of their playoff fate. They would prevail with a lone goal in the 12th minute from Fanendo Adi, who sent the Timbers on a 1–0 victory, shutting out Salt Lake. The Timbers would now prepare for their 2nd CONCACAF Champions League match.

Playing their first CONCACAF Champions league away match of the year, the Timbers traveled to Costa Rica to take on Deportivo Saprissa. Diego Valeri would strike first putting the timbers up in the 6th minute. Unfortunately, Jermaine Taylor would equalize for Saprissa in the 33rd minute. In the 45th and 73rd minutes, Saprissa was awarded two penalties, both taken and scored by Marvin Angulo. Saprissa got their final goal from Fabrizio Ronchetti in the 60th minute. Finally, Fanendo Adi scored in the 68th minute but still would not be enough and the Timbers would settle for a 4–2 loss.

On September 18, Jack Jewsbury, the first Timbers captain of their MLS era, announced he would retire at the end of the 2016 season.

Ending their busy week, the Timbers hosted Philadelphia Union. The match went scoreless during the first half, however at the start of the second, Diego Valeri put the ball in the back of the net in the 46th minute, assisted by Darren Mattocks. Immediately after, Chris Pontius would equalize Philadelphia making it 1–1. A few minutes later, Fanendo Adi would put the Timbers back in the lead with a goal in the 53rd minute. In the 85th minute, Philadelphia's Joshua Yaro would be should a 2nd yellow and be sent off, giving the Timbers breathing room to close out the match at 2–1. For the first time this year, the Timbers would move up to 5th place.

The Timbers traveled to Houston where they went against Houston Dynamo. Still looking for their first road win of the season, the Timbers would fall 3–1 with a lone goal from Diego Valeri in the 51st minute. Houston's Mauro Manotas would capture a hat trick.

The Timbers traveled to their final away match in CCL group stage play to face Club Deportivo Dragón in El Salvador. The Timbers would go down by a goal by Kevin Melara in the 54th minute. Fanendo Adi would score in the 79th minute, giving the Timbers a chance to pull back. In the 90th minute, Darlington Nagbe was able to take a free kick and send the ball in the back of the net, granting the Timbers first away win of the year by finishing the match 2-1 and keeping the Timbers hopes for CCL advancement alive.

Position at the end of September

Pos	Team	Pld	W	D	L	GF	GA	GD	Pts
7	Portland Timbers	31	11	8	12	46	48	−2	41

=== October ===
As the regular season begins to come to a close and still chasing a playoff spot, the Timbers traveled to Commerce City to face Colorado Rapids. The Timbers attempted to serve Colorado their first loss at home with a goal from Diego Valeri that was called offside. Later in the 63rd Sebastien Le Toux would put the Rapids ahead and take all 3 points from the Timbers with a final score of 1–0.

On October 14, the Timbers announced that they have signed Portland Timbers 2 defender, Marco Farfan to a Homegrown Player deal. He will be on the active roster during the start of the 2017 season.

Playing their final regular season home match, the Timbers continued their away/home back-to-back matches with Colorado Rapids. Before the start of the anthem, Jack Jewsbury was honored and said his goodbyes to the crowd. After the anthem, the Timbers Army raised a tifo saying "Always keep your goals in focus and beautiful things will develop" with two sticks off of each player as a developed photo. The match began and in the 35th minute, the Timbers were awarded a penalty and it was successfully converted by Fanendo Adi. Shortly after in the 39th minute, the Timbers were awarded another penalty and was to be taken by Fanendo Adi, unfortunately, the shot was blocked and missed on the rebound. The Timbers would win 1–0, putting them in full control of their playoff destiny with a win next week in Vancouver.

On October 18, Ned Grabavoy announced that he would retire at the end of the season.

The Timbers traveled for their final match of the season up in Vancouver, B.C. where they challenged Vancouver Whitecaps F.C. for a chance to reach the playoffs and win the Cascadia Cup. The Timbers Army opened with an E.T. themed tifo saying "Let's get you home". The match would prove to be a disaster as the Timbers only scored a single goal off a penalty taken and converted by Diego Valeri in the 72nd minute. The Timbers fell, 1–4, losing both a playoff spot and the Cascadia Cup, marking an end to the 2016 season.

Position at the end of the season

Pos	Team	Pld	W	D	L	GF	GA	GD	Pts
7	Portland Timbers	34	12	8	14	48	53	−5	44

== Competitions ==
=== Competitions overview ===
Competition	Record								Started round	First match	Last match	Final position
Competition	G	W	D	L	GF	GA	GD	Win %				
MLS Overall (Supporters' Shield)*	34	12	8	14	48	53	−5	35.29	MLS 1	March 6, 2016	October 23, 2016	11th
MLS Western Conference*	34	12	8	14	48	53	−5	35.29	MLS 1	March 6, 2016	October 23, 2016	7th
MLS Cup Playoffs	0	0	0	0	0	0	+0	—	DNQ			
U.S. Open Cup	2	1	0	1	2	1	+1	50.00	4th Round	June 15, 2016	June 29, 2016	Round of 16
CONCACAF Champions League	4	2	1	1	7	7	+0	50.00	Group stage (B)	August 3, 2016	October 19, 2016	Group stage
Cascadia Cup*	6	3	0	3	15	13	+2	50.00	MLS 10	May 7, 2016	October 23, 2016	2nd
Total	40	15	9	16	57	61	−4	37.50				

Updated to match played October 23, 2016
Source: Competitions
MLS Supporters' Shield, MLS Western Conference, and Cascadia Cup are all part of MLS regular season play. As a result, only the Supporters' Shield portion is included in the total.

=== Major League Soccer ===
==== Preseason ====
Desert Friendlies
Win Draw Loss Upcoming fixture

January 31, 2016 1	FC Tucson	1–0	Portland Timbers	Tucson, Arizona
10:30 (PST)	Schwartz 48'	Report		Stadium: Kino Veterans Memorial Stadium

February 3, 2016 2	Portland Timbers	1–1	Houston Dynamo	Tucson, Arizona
17:00 (PST)	Asprilla 38'; Brett (yellow card) 65'; Idowu (yellow card) 71'	Report	Manotas 74'	Stadium: Kino Veterans Memorial Stadium

February 6, 2016 3	Portland Timbers	2–1	Seattle Sounders FC	Tucson, Arizona
18:00 (PST)	Peay (yellow card) 52'; McInerney 66', 84'	Report	Jones 53'	Stadium: Kino Veterans Memorial Stadium; Referee: Kevin Stott

February 11, 2016 4	Portland Timbers	1–0	Real Salt Lake	Tucson, Arizona
10:30 (PST)	Melano 1'; Taylor (yellow card) 28'	Report	Beckerman (yellow card) 22'	Stadium: Kino Veterans Memorial Stadium

Simple Invitational (Rose City Invitational)

Pos	Team	Pld	W	D	L	GF	GA	GD	Pts
1	Chicago Fire	3	3	0	0	9	2	+7	9
2	Vancouver Whitecaps FC	3	2	0	1	7	4	+3	6
3	Portland Timbers	3	1	0	2	4	4	0	3
4	Minnesota United FC	3	0	0	3	1	11	−10	0

Win Draw Loss Upcoming fixture

February 21, 2016 1	Portland Timbers	4–0	Minnesota United FC	Portland, Oregon
17:00 (PST)	Adi 11' (pen.); Melano 36'; Nagbe 56'; Valeri 63' (pen.); Grabavoy (yellow card) 81'	Report	Calvano (red card) 45'; Venegas (red card) 62'; Walls (yellow card) 76'	Stadium: Providence Park; Attendance: 13,431

February 24, 2016 2	Portland Timbers	0–2	Vancouver Whitecaps FC	Portland, Oregon
19:30 (PST)		Report	Kah (yellow card) 24'; Pérez 38'; Rivero 72'	Stadium: Providence Park; Attendance: 14,208; Referee: Ricardo Salazar

February 27, 2016 3	Portland Timbers	0–2	Chicago Fire SC	Portland, Oregon
17:00 (PST)	Valentin (yellow card) 20'; Taylor (yellow card) 34'; Chará (yellow card) 55'	Report	Meira (yellow card) 4'; Álvarez 28'; Gilberto 35'; Polster (yellow card) 80'; Igboananike (yellow card) 81'	Stadium: Providence Park; Attendance: 16,134; Referee: Baldomero Toledo

==== MLS regular season ====
Win Draw Loss Upcoming fixture

March 6, 2016 1	Portland Timbers	2–1	Columbus Crew SC	Portland, Oregon
13:30 (PST)	Valeri 23'; Taylor (yellow card) 46'; Adi 79', (yellow card) 87'; Powell (yellow card) 81'	Report	Sauro (yellow card) 25'; Trapp (yellow card) 45'; Higuaín 58'	Stadium: Providence Park; Attendance: 21,144; Referee: Baldomero Toledo

March 13, 2016 2	San Jose Earthquakes	2–1	Portland Timbers	San Jose, California
16:00 (PST)	Wondolowski 30'; Amarikwa 89'; Bernárdez (yellow card) 64'; Bingham (yellow card) 90'	Report	McInerney 89'	Stadium: Avaya Stadium; Attendance: 18,000; Referee: Jair Marrufo

March 19, 2016 3	Portland Timbers	2–2	Real Salt Lake	Portland, Oregon
19:30 (PST)	Adi (yellow card) 68', (goal) 79', 84' (pen.); Powell (yellow card) 76'	Report	Plata 16'; Beckerman (red card) 31'; Movsisyan 58'; Olave (red card) 83'; Obayan (yellow card) 87'; Martínez (yellow card) 90+5'	Stadium: Providence Park; Attendance: 21,144; Referee: Hilario Grajeda

April 3, 2016 4	Orlando City SC	4–1	Portland Timbers	Orlando, Florida
17:00 (PST)	Hines 13'; Shea (yellow card) 15' (goal) 32'; Kaká 48'; Bendik (yellow card) 71'; Molino 76' (pen.)	Report	Powell (yellow card) 38'; Barmby (yellow card) 41'; Taylor (yellow card) 74'; McInerney 89'	Stadium: Citrus Bowl; Attendance: 31,114; Referee: Alan Kelly

April 10, 2016 5	LA Galaxy	1–1	Portland Timbers	Carson, California
18:30 (PST)	de Jong (yellow card) 74'; Borchers 83' (o.g.)	Report	Borchers (yellow card) 16'; Adi 52'; Grabavoy (yellow card) 87'	Stadium: StubHub Center; Attendance: 25,667; Referee: Allen Chapman

April 13, 2016 6	Portland Timbers	1–3	FC Dallas	Portland, Oregon
19:30 (PST)	Grabavoy (yellow card) 17'; Taylor (yellow card) 40'; Jewsbury (yellow card) 58'; Mattocks 67'	Report	Barrios 4'; Gruezo (yellow card) 22'; Castillo 26'; Akindele 29'; Zimmerman (yellow card) 33'; Akindele (yellow card) 68'; Harris (yellow card) 90+1'	Stadium: Providence Park; Attendance: 21,144; Referee: Juan Guzman

April 16, 2016 7	Portland Timbers	3–1	San Jose Earthquakes	Portland, Oregon
19:30 (PST)	McInerney 52'; Adi 65'; Borchers (yellow card) 90'; Valeri (yellow card) 90+4' (yellow card) 90+5' (red card); Adi 90+9'	Report	Godoy (yellow card) 55'; Bingham (yellow card) 90+4'; Wondolowski 90+1' (pen.)	Stadium: Providence Park; Attendance: 21,144; Referee: Chris Penso

April 27, 2016 8	New England Revolution	1–1	Portland Timbers	Foxboro, Massachusetts
16:30 (PST)	Fagundez (yellow card) 53'; Taylor 89' (o.g.); Nguyen (yellow card) 90+4'	Report	Valentin (yellow card) 45'; Barmby 64'	Stadium: Gillette Stadium; Attendance: 10,144; Referee: Ismail Elfath

May 1, 2016 9	Portland Timbers	2–1	Toronto FC	Portland, Oregon
12:30 (PST)	Adi 17'; Ridgewell (yellow card) 61'; Valeri 74'; Asprilla (yellow card) 82'	Report	Johnson 40'; Perquis (yellow card) 56'	Stadium: Providence Park; Attendance: 21,144; Referee: Baldomero Toledo

May 7, 2016 10 Cascadia Cup	Vancouver Whitecaps FC	2–1	Portland Timbers	Vancouver, BC
14:00 (PST)	Morales (yellow card) 10'; Watson (yellow card) 15'; Kudo 60'; Bolaños 66'; Pérez (yellow card) 69'	Report	Borchers; Nagbe (yellow card) 70'	Stadium: BC Place; Attendance: 22,120; Referee: Kevin Stott

May 11, 2016 11	FC Dallas	2–1	Portland Timbers	Frisco, Texas
18:00 (PST)	Zimmerman (yellow card) 48'; Hollingshead 55'; Zimmerman 57'; Castillo (yellow card) 77'	Report	Valeri 4'; Melano (yellow card) 46'; Valeri (yellow card) 88'	Stadium: Toyota Stadium; Attendance: 10,381; Referee: Alan Kelly

May 15, 2016 12	Portland Timbers	1–2	New York City FC	Portland, Oregon
16:30 (PST)	Zemanski (yellow card) 38'; Adi 55'	Report	Villa 12'; Allen (yellow card) 24'; McNamara 65'; Saunders (yellow card) 87'	Stadium: Providence Park; Attendance: 21,144; Referee: Hilario Grajeda

May 22, 2016 13 Cascadia Cup	Portland Timbers	4–2	Vancouver Whitecaps FC	Portland, Oregon
13:30 (PST)	Valeri 3' (pen.); McInerney 28', (yellow card) 41'; Asprilla 77' (pen.); Nagbe 82'	Report	Erik Hurtado (yellow card) 30'; Parker (yellow card) 46'; Manneh 49'; Morales (yellow card) 80' (goal) 83'; Watson (yellow card) 90'	Stadium: Providence Park; Attendance: 21,144; Referee: Ted Unkel

May 28, 2016 14	Chicago Fire	1–1	Portland Timbers	Bridgeview, Illinois
17:30 (PST)	Accam 20'; Kappelhof (yellow card) 38'; Ramos (yellow card) 77'	Report	Valeri 18'; Ridgewell (yellow card) 69'; Klute (yellow card) 90'	Attendance: 14,729; Referee: Mathieu Bourdeau

June 1, 2016 15	Portland Timbers	1–0	San Jose Earthquakes	Portland, Oregon
19:30 (PST)	Ridgewell 11'; Asprilla (red card) 45+1'	Report	Silva (yellow card) 17'; Stewart (yellow card) 61'; Barrett (yellow card) 78'; Pérez García (yellow card) 90+2'	Stadium: Providence Park; Attendance: 21,144; Referee: Chris Penso

June 18, 2016 16	Real Salt Lake	2–2	Portland Timbers	Sandy, Utah
19:00 (PST)	Martínez 17'; Beltran (yellow card) 56'; Glad (yellow card) 66'; Movsisyan 70' (pen.)	Report	Adi 29'; Chará (yellow card) 33'; Zemanski (yellow card) 33'; Melano 44'; Valentin (yellow card) 84'	Stadium: Rio Tinto Stadium; Attendance: 20,317; Referee: Allan Kelly

June 26, 2016 17	Portland Timbers	3–2	Houston Dynamo	Portland, Oregon
15:00 (PST)	Melano 63'; Valeri 82' (pen.); Valeri 90+1' (pen.); Adi (yellow card) 90+3'	Report	Wenger 28'; Bruin 30'; Horst (yellow card) 42'; Alex (yellow card) 90+2'	Stadium: Providence Park; Attendance: 21,144; Referee: Hilario Grajeda

July 4, 2016 18	Colorado Rapids	0–0	Portland Timbers	Commerce City, Colorado
18:00 (PST)	Miller (yellow card) 15'	Report	Chará (yellow card) 50'	Stadium: Dick's Sporting Goods Park; Attendance: 18,579; Referee: Ricardo Salazar

July 10, 2016 19	New York Red Bulls	0–0	Portland Timbers	Harrison, New Jersey
15:00 (PST)	Miller (yellow card) 15'	Report	Chará (yellow card) 14'; Powell (yellow card) 64'	Stadium: Red Bull Arena; Attendance: 19,985; Referee: Kevin Stott

July 13, 2016 20	Portland Timbers	1–1	Montreal Impact	Portland, Oregon
19:30 (PST)	McInerney 14'; Adi (yellow card) 70'	Report	Piatti (yellow card) 18' (goal) 44'; Shipp (yellow card) 68'; Camara (yellow card) 70'	Stadium: Providence Park; Attendance: 21,144; Referee: Allen Chapman

July 17, 2016 21 Cascadia Cup	Portland Timbers	3–1	Seattle Sounders FC	Portland, Oregon
12:00 (PST)	Jewsbury (yellow card) 11'; Valeri 44', 50'; Adi 64'	Report	Jones (yellow card) 37'; Marshall 59'; Alonso (yellow card) 66'	Stadium: Providence Park; Attendance: 21,144; Referee: Jair Marrufo

July 23, 2016 22	Portland Timbers	1–2	LA Galaxy	Portland, Oregon
12:30 (PST)	Valentin 41'	Report	Keane 7'; Zardes 11'	Stadium: Providence Park; Attendance: 21.144; Referee: Allan Kelly

July 31, 2016 23	Sporting Kansas City	1–0	Portland Timbers	Kansas City, Kansas
11:00 (PST)	Peterson 50'; Medranda (yellow card) 72'; Espinoza (yellow card) 87'	Report	Adi (yellow card) 10'; Taylor (yellow card) 74'; Chará (yellow card) 86'	Stadium: Children's Mercy Park; Attendance: 19,098; Referee: Ricardo Salazar

August 7, 2016 24	Portland Timbers	3–0	Sporting Kansas City	Portland, Oregon
13:00 (PST)	Chará (red card) 12'; Valeri 65'; Jewsbury 87'; Adi 90+2'	Report	Sinovic (yellow card) 19'; Mustivar (red card) 39'; Espinoza (yellow card) 47'	Stadium: Providence Park; Attendance: 21,144; Referee: Baldomero Toledo

August 13, 2016 25	D.C. United	2–0	Portland Timbers	Washington, District of Columbia
16:00 (PST)	Birnbaum 7'; Acosta 29'; Boswell (yellow card) 56'; Franklin (yellow card) 75'	Report	Ridgewell (yellow card) 50'; Jewsbury (yellow card) 57'; Andriuškevičius (yellow card) 83'	Stadium: RFK Stadium; Attendance: 16,298; Referee: Jorge González

August 21, 2016 26 Cascadia Cup	Seattle Sounders FC	3–1	Portland Timbers	Seattle, Washington
18:30 (PST)	Ivanschitz (yellow card) 37'; Jones (yellow card) 40'; Dempsey 61' (pen.); Dempsey 80'; Roldan 83'	Report	Chará (yellow card) 42'; Adi 90+3'	Stadium: CenturyLink Field; Attendance: 53,302; Referee: Alan Kelly

August 28, 2016 27 Cascadia Cup	Portland Timbers	4–2	Seattle Sounders FC	Portland, Oregon
14:00 (PST)	Vytas 16'; Adi 21'; Melano 29'; S. Taylor 43'	Report	Lodeiro (yellow card) 26'; Ivanschitz (yellow card) 45' (goal) 47'; Morris 51'; Jones (yellow card) 78'; Valdez (yellow card) 90'	Stadium: Providence Park; Attendance: 21,144; Referee: Hilario Grajeda

September 3, 2016 28	FC Dallas	3–1	Portland Timbers	Frisco, Texas
18:00 (PST)	Díaz 14' (pen.); Ulloa 45+2'; Ortiz (yellow card) 46'; Zimmerman 53'; Hedges (yellow card) 54'; Urruti (yellow card) 59'	Report	Jewsbury (yellow card) 22'; Ridgewell (yellow card) 52'; Valeri 87'; Grabavoy (yellow card) 90+2'	Stadium: Toyota Stadium; Attendance: 14,207; Referee: Baldomero Toledo

September 10, 2016 29	Portland Timbers	1–0	Real Salt Lake	Portland, Oregon
19:30 (PST)	Adi 12'; Ridgewell (yellow card) 50'; Gleeson (yellow card) 86'	Report	Sunny (yellow card) 40'; Morales (yellow card) 54'; Phillips (yellow card) 75'; Plata (yellow card) 90'	Stadium: Providence Park; Attendance: 21,144; Referee: Drew Fischer

September 17, 2016 30	Portland Timbers	2–1	Philadelphia Union	Portland, Oregon
15:00 (PST)	Valeri 46'; Adi 53'	Report	Yaro (yellow card) 25'; Bedoya (yellow card) 35'; Pontius 47'; Carroll (yellow card) 78'; Yaro (yellow card) 85' (red card)	Stadium: Providence Park; Attendance: 21,144; Referee: Chris Penso

September 24, 2016 31	Houston Dynamo	3–1	Portland Timbers	Houston, Texas
16:00 (PST)	Manotas 34' (pen.), 73', 85'	Report	Valeri 51'	Stadium: BBVA Compass Stadium; Attendance: 19,404; Referee: Juan Guzman

October 1, 2016 32	Colorado Rapids	1–0	Portland Timbers	Commerce City, Colorado
18:00 (PST)	Badji (yellow card) 8'; Le Toux 63'; MacMath (yellow card) 77'; Burch (yellow card) 78'; Le Toux (yellow card) 83'; Cronin (yellow card) 90+1'; Williams (yellow card) 90+2'	Report	Chará (yellow card) 38'; Adi (yellow card) 73'	Stadium: Dick's Sporting Goods Park; Attendance: 17,554; Referee: Allen Chapman

October 16, 2016 33	Portland Timbers	1–0	Colorado Rapids	Portland, Oregon
14:00 (PST)	Ridgewell (yellow card) 21'; Adi 35' (pen.); Chará (yellow card) 50'; Andriuškevičius (yellow card) 90+5'	Report	Calvert (yellow card) 26'; Williams (yellow card) 32'; Burling (yellow card) 33'; Azira (yellow card) 79'; Doyle (yellow card) 89'; Watts (yellow card) 90+3'	Stadium: Providence Park; Attendance: 21,144; Referee: Silviu Petrescu

October 23, 2016 34 Cascadia Cup	Vancouver Whitecaps FC	4–1	Portland Timbers	Vancouver, BC
13:00 (PST)	Barnes 13'; Watson (yellow card) 26'; Barnes 32'; Morales 54' (yellow card) 54'; Mezquida 55'	Report	Adi (yellow card) 37'; Valeri 72' (pen.)	Stadium: BC Place; Attendance: 24,083; Referee: Alan Kelly

The 2016 MLS regular-season schedule was released on January 7, 2016.

===== Results by round =====
Round	1	2	3	4	5	6	7	8	9	10	11	12	13	14	15	16	17	18	19	20	21	22	23	24	25	26	27	28	29	30	31	32	33	34
Stadium	H	A	H	A	A	H	H	A	H	A	A	H	H	A	H	A	H	A	A	H	H	H	A	H	A	A	H	A	H	H	A	A	H	A
Result	W	L	D	L	D	L	W	D	W	L	L	L	W	D	W	D	W	D	D	D	W	L	L	W	L	L	W	L	W	W	L	L	W	L

Updated to match(es) played on October 16, 2016. Source: Schedule
A = Away; H = Home; W = Win; D = Draw; L = Loss

===== Results by location =====
Overall								Home						Away					
Pld	W	D	L	GF	GA	GD	Pts	W	D	L	GF	GA	GD	W	D	L	GF	GA	GD
34	12	8	14	48	53	−5	44	12	2	3	35	21	+14	0	6	11	13	32	−19

Last updated: October 24, 2016.
Source: MLS Regular Season

===== Western Conference standings =====
Pos	Team	Pld	W	L	T	GF	GA	GD	Pts	Qualification
5	Sporting Kansas City	34	13	13	8	42	41	+1	47	MLS Cup Knockout Round
6	Real Salt Lake	34	12	12	10	44	46	−2	46	MLS Cup Knockout Round
7	Portland Timbers	34	12	14	8	48	53	−5	44	
8	Vancouver Whitecaps FC	34	10	15	9	45	52	−7	39	
9	San Jose Earthquakes	34	8	12	14	32	40	−8	38	

Source: MLS

===== Overall standings =====
Pos	Team	Pld	W	L	T	GF	GA	GD	Pts
10	D.C. United	34	11	10	13	53	47	+6	46
11	Montreal Impact	34	11	11	12	49	53	−4	45
12	Portland Timbers	34	12	14	8	48	53	−5	44
13	Philadelphia Union	34	11	14	9	52	55	−3	42
14	New England Revolution	34	11	14	9	44	54	−10	42

Source: MLS
Rules for classification: 1) points; 2) total wins; 3) total goal differential; 4) total goals scored;

=== MLS Cup Playoffs ===
The Timbers did not defend their 2015 MLS Cup win. They went into the final match of the season needing their first road win of the 2016 season to clinch a playoff berth. The Timbers lost the match against the Vancouver Whitecaps, 4–1, in what was a "shameful ending to a deeply disappointing season."

=== U.S. Open Cup ===
Win Draw Loss Upcoming fixture

June 15, 2016 Fourth round	Portland Timbers	2–0	San Jose Earthquakes	Portland, Oregon
19:30 (PST)	Asprilla 34'; McInerney 40'; Peay (yellow card) 71'	Report	Jahn (yellow card) 83'; Stewart (yellow card) 88'	Stadium: Providence Park; Attendance: 16,834; Referee: Allen Chapman

June 29, 2016 Round of 16	Portland Timbers	0–1	LA Galaxy	Portland, Oregon
19:30 (PST)	Jewsbury (yellow card) 78'	Report	Mendiola 5'; Larentowicz (yellow card) 57'	Stadium: Providence Park; Attendance: 18,164; Referee: Edvin Jurisevic

=== CONCACAF Champions League ===
Win Draw Loss Upcoming fixture

Group B

August 3, 2016 1	Portland Timbers (United States)	2–1	(El Salvador) C.D. Dragón	Portland, Oregon
19:00 (PST)	McInerney 21'; Valeri 90'	Report	Polio (yellow card) 55'; Osorio (yellow card) 57'; Monteagudo (yellow card) 68'; Hernández (yellow card) 84'; Cruz (yellow card) 90+4'	Stadium: Providence Park; Attendance: 16,268; Referee: Jafeth Perea (Panama)

September 14, 2016 2	Deportivo Saprissa (Costa Rica)	4–2	(United States) Portland Timbers	San José, Costa Rica
19:00 (PST)	Calvo (yellow card) 20'; Taylor 33' (o.g.); Angulo 45' (pen.), 73' (pen.); Ronchetti 60'	Report	Valeri 5'; Adi (yellow card) 20'; Melano (yellow card) 22'; S. Taylor (yellow card) 32'; Valeri (yellow card) 44'; Adi 68'	Stadium: Estadio Ricardo Saprissa Aymá; Referee: Yadel Martínez (Cuba)

September 27, 2016 3	C.D. Dragón (El Salvador)	1–2	(United States) Portland Timbers	Santa Tecla, El Salvador
19:00 (PST)	Rodríguez (yellow card) 11'; Jack (yellow card) 31'; Melara 54'	Report	Ridgewell (yellow card) 76'; Adi 79'; McInerney (yellow card) 89'; Nagbe 90'	Stadium: Estadio Atletico Las Delicias; Referee: José Kellys (Panama)

October 19, 2016 4	Portland Timbers (United States)	1–1	(Costa Rica) Deportivo Saprissa	Portland, Oregon
19:00 (PST)	McInerney (yellow card) 45'; McInerney 57'; Chará (yellow card) 90+4'	Report	Blackburn 24'; Arauz (yellow card) 52'; Calvo (yellow card) 59'; Machado (yellow card) 77'; Guzmán (yellow card) 89'; Carvajal (yellow card) 89'	Stadium: Providence Park; Attendance: 16,977; Referee: Walter López

Pos	Team	Pld	W	D	L	GF	GA	GD	Pts	Qualification	SAP	POR	DRA
1	(Costa Rica) Saprissa	4	2	2	0	11	3	+8	8	Quarter-finals	—	4–2	6−0
2	(United States) Portland Timbers	4	2	1	1	7	7	0	7		1−1	—	2–1
3	(El Salvador) Dragón	4	0	1	3	2	10	−8	1		0−0	1–2	—

Source: CONCACAF

=== Cascadia Cup ===
The Cascadia Cup is a trophy that was created in 2004 by supporters of the Portland Timbers, Seattle Sounders FC and Vancouver Whitecaps FC. It is awarded to the club with the best record in MLS regular-season games versus the other participants.

Pos	Team	Pld	W	D	L	GF	GA	GD	Pts
1	Vancouver Whitecaps FC	6	3	0	3	11	10	+1	9
2	Portland Timbers	6	3	0	3	14	14	0	9
3	Seattle Sounders FC	6	3	0	3	10	11	−1	9

Win Draw Loss Upcoming fixture

May 7, 2016 10 Cascadia Cup	Vancouver Whitecaps FC	1–2	Portland Timbers	Vancouver, BC, Canada
14:00 (PST)	Morales (yellow card) 10'; Watson (yellow card) 15'; Kudo 60'; Bolaños 66'; Pérez (yellow card) 69'	Report	Borchers 34'; Nagbe (yellow card) 70'	Stadium: BC Place; Attendance: 22,120; Referee: Kevin Stott

May 22, 2016 13 Cascadia Cup	Portland Timbers	4–2	Vancouver Whitecaps FC	Portland, Oregon, U.S.
13:30 (PST)	Valeri 3' (pen.); McInerney 28' (yellow card) 41'; Asprilla 77' (pen.); Nagbe 82'	Report	Erik Hurtado (yellow card) 30'; Parker (yellow card) 46'; Manneh 49'; Morales (yellow card) 80' (goal) 83'; Watson (yellow card) 90'	Stadium: Providence Park; Attendance: 21,144; Referee: Ted Unkel

July 17, 2016 21 Cascadia Cup	Portland Timbers	3–1	Seattle Sounders FC	Portland, Oregon, U.S
12:00 (PST)	Jewsbury (yellow card) 11'; Valeri 44', 50'; Adi 64' (Melano)	Report	Jones (yellow card) 37'; Marshall 59'; Alonso (yellow card) 66'	Stadium: Providence Park; Attendance: 21,144; Referee: Jair Marrufo

August 21, 2016 26 Cascadia Cup	Seattle Sounders FC	3–1	Portland Timbers	Seattle, Washington, U.S.
18:30 (PST)	Ivanschitz (yellow card) 37'; Jones (yellow card) 40'; Dempsey 61' (pen.); Dempsey 80'; Roldan 83'	Report	Chará (yellow card) 42'; Adi 90+3'	Stadium: CenturyLink Field; Attendance: 53,302; Referee: Alan Kelly

August 28, 2016 27 Cascadia Cup	Portland Timbers	4–2	Seattle Sounders FC	Portland, Oregon, U.S.
14:00 (PST)	Vytas 16'; Adi 21'; Melano 29'; S. Taylor 43'	Report	Lodeiro (yellow card) 26'; Ivanschitz (yellow card) 45' (goal) 47'; Morris 51'; Jones (yellow card) 78'; Valdez (yellow card) 90'	Stadium: Providence Park; Attendance: 21,144; Referee: Hilario Grajeda

October 23, 2016 34 Cascadia Cup	Vancouver Whitecaps FC	4-1	Portland Timbers	Vancouver, BC, Canada
13:00 (PST)	Barnes 13', 32'; Waston (yellow card) 26'; Pedro Morales 54' (yellow card) 54'; Mezquida 55'	Report	Adi (yellow card) 37'; Valeri 72' (pen.)	Stadium: BC Place; Attendance: 24,083; Referee: Alan Kelly

== Club ==
=== Executive staff ===
Position	Staff
Majority Owner & President	Merritt Paulson
Chief Operating Officer	Mike Golub
General Manager / Technical Director	Gavin Wilkinson

Last updated: January 12, 2016
Source: Portland Timbers

=== Coaching staff ===
Position	Staff
Head Coach	Caleb Porter
Assistant Coach	Pablo Moreira
Assistant Coach	Sean McAuley
Assistant Coach	Cameron Knowles
Assistant Coach/Portland Timbers 2 Head Coach	Andrew Gregor
Goalkeeping Coach	Adin Brown
Head Athletic Trainer	Nik Wald, ATC
Assistant Athletic Trainer	Alex Margarito, ATC
Director of Sports Science	Nick Milanos

Last updated: March 13, 2016
Source: Portland Timbers

=== Stadiums ===
Ground (capacity and dimensions)	Providence Park (21,144 / 110x75 yards)
Training Ground	Adidas Training Facility

Source: Providence Park

== Kits ==
Kits are used for a period of two years. Afterwards, a new kit is released. The year for each kit is offset so that one of the two changes each year. The primary kit is due to change at the end of this year.

=== Primary kit ===
The first kit was released in 2015 and was used until the end of the 2016 season. It features a large chevron on the chest with its primary colors being dark green, light green, and white. It features the sponsor Alaska Airlines on the front. In 2016, the first kit was altered to have Alaska's Airline's logo changed to their new logo, which just uses "Alaska". The kit also received a golden star, which is formal for any club who wins the MLS Cup the previous year. Inside the star can be found a "15" to commemorate the 2015 year.

Primary	Primary Alt.

Type	Shirt	Shorts	Socks
Primary	Green / White	White	Green
Primary Alt.	Green / White	Green	Green

=== Secondary kit ===
The new secondary kit will be used from 2016 until the end of the 2017 season. It features a red fading to black hoop style with each fade's border being the shape of thorns which represents Portland's nickname, the Rose City. The kit however is not full hoops, the back is a solid red where the player's name and number are featured. The kit also has an alternative Alaska Airlines logo, however, with "Airlines" in small font below the logo.

Secondary

Type	Shirt	Shorts	Socks
Secondary	Red / Black	Black	Red

=== Third, alternative kit ===
The Timbers did not have a third kit for the 2016 season.

== Squad information ==
=== First-team squad ===
All players contracted to the club during the season included.
Last updated: August 8, 2016

No.	Name	Nationality	Positions	Date of birth (age)	Year with club (year signed)
Goalkeepers
1	Chris Konopka	(United States)	GK	April 14, 1985 (age 41)	1 (2016)
33	Wade Hamilton	(United States)	GK	September 15, 1994 (age 31)	1 (2016)
90	Jake Gleeson	(New Zealand)	GK	June 26, 1990 (age 36)	6 (2011)
Defenders
2	Alvas Powell	(Jamaica)	RB	July 18, 1994 (age 31)	4 (2013)
4	Jermaine Taylor	(Jamaica)	LB / CB / RB	January 14, 1985 (age 41)	1 (2016)
5	Vytautas Andriuškevičius (INT)	(Lithuania)	LB / CB	October 8, 1990 (age 35)	1 (2016)
7	Nat Borchers	(United States)	CB	April 13, 1981 (age 45)	2 (2015)
12	Gbenga Arokoyo (INT)	(Nigeria)	DF	September 4, 1992 (age 33)	1 (2016)
15	Chris Klute (Loaned)	(United States)	LB	March 5, 1990 (age 36)	1 (2016)
16	Zarek Valentin	(United States)	LB	August 6, 1991 (age 34)	1 (2016)
18	Amobi Okugo	(United States)	LB / CB / MF	March 13, 1991 (age 35)	1 (2016)
20	Taylor Peay	(United States)	LB / RB	September 5, 1991 (age 34)	2 (2014)
24	Liam Ridgewell (DP)	(England)	CB / LB	June 21, 1984 (age 42)	2 (2014)
27	Steven Taylor (INT)	(England)	CB	January 23, 1986 (age 40)	1 (2016)
28	Andy Thoma	(United States)	LB	April 29, 1993 (age 33)	2 (2015)
Midfielders
6	Darlington Nagbe	(United States)	LW / CAM / RW / FW	July 19, 1990 (age 35)	6 (2011)
8	Diego Valeri (DP)	(Argentina)	CAM	May 1, 1986 (age 40)	4 (2013)
10	Ned Grabavoy	(United States)	LW	July 1, 1983 (age 43)	1 (2016)
11	Dairon Asprilla (Loaned)	(Colombia)	RW / LW / FW	May 25, 1992 (age 34)	2 (2015)
13	Jack Jewsbury	(United States)	CM / RB	April 13, 1981 (age 45)	6 (2011)
14	Ben Zemanski	(United States)	CDM	May 12, 1988 (age 38)	4 (2013)
17	Nick Besler	(United States)	CM	May 7, 1993 (age 33)	2 (2015)
21	Diego Chara	(Colombia)	CDM	April 5, 1986 (age 40)	6 (2011)
23	Jack Barmby (Loan) (INT)	(England)	LB / LW / RW / ST	November 14, 1994 (age 31)	1 (2016)
25	Neco Brett (INT)	(Jamaica)	RW / FW	March 22, 1992 (age 34)	1 (2016)
Forwards
9	Fanendo Adi (INT)	(Nigeria)	CF	October 10, 1990 (age 35)	2 (2015)
11	Ben Polk	(England)	CF	September 19, 1992 (age 33)	1 (2016)
22	Darren Mattocks	(Jamaica)	CF / LW / RW	September 2, 1990 (age 35)	1 (2016)
26	Lucas Melano (DP) (INT)	(Argentina)	CF / LW / RW	March 1, 1993 (age 33)	2 (2015)
99	Jack McInerney	(United States)	CF	August 5, 1992 (age 33)	1 (2016)

- (HG) = Homegrown Player
- (GA) = Generation Adidas
- (DP) = Designated Player
- (INT) = International Roster Spot
- (Loan) = On Loan
- (Loaned) = Loaned out to another club

== Player/Staff Transactions ==
=== Transfers in ===
Date	Player	Positions	Previous club	Fee/notes	Ref
December 11, 2015	(United States) Chris Klute	DF	(United States) Columbus Crew SC	Traded for general allocation money	
January 12, 2016	(United States) Zarek Valentin	DF	(Norway) FK Bodø/Glimt	Traded international roster spot to Montreal Impact	
January 12, 2016	(United States) Ned Grabavoy	MF	(United States) New York City FC	MLS Free Agent	
January 13, 2016	(United States) Jack McInerney	FW	(United States) Columbus Crew SC	Traded for targeted allocation money and general allocation money	
January 22, 2015	(Jamaica) Jermaine Taylor	DF	(United States) Houston Dynamo	Re-Entry Draft Second Stage	
March 1, 2016	(England) Ben Polk	FW	(United States) Syracuse Orange	Signed from 2016 MLS SuperDraft	
March 1, 2016	(Jamaica) Neco Brett	MF / FW	(United States) Robert Morris Colonials	Signed from 2016 MLS SuperDraft	
March 1, 2016	(United States) Wade Hamilton	GK	(United States) Cal Poly Mustangs	Signed from 2016 MLS SuperDraft	
March 14, 2016	(Jamaica) Darren Mattocks	FW / LW / RW	(Canada) Vancouver Whitecaps FC	Traded for Targeted Allocation Money in 2016	
May 16, 2016	(United States) Amobi Okugo	DF / MF	(United States) Sporting Kansas City	Unattached to any MLS Club. Signed from MLS.	
July 14, 2016	(Lithuania) Vytautas Andriuškevičius	DF	(Netherlands) SC Cambuur	Undisclosed	
July 28, 2016	(United States) Chris Konopka	GK	(Scotland) Ross County FC	Undisclosed	
August 1, 2016	(England) Steven Taylor	DF	(England) Newcastle United	Free agent, Discovery Signing	
August 2, 2016	(Nigeria) Gbenga Arokoyo	DF	(United States) New York City FC	Signed for Targeted Allocation Money and a conditional third-round 2017 MLS SuperDraft pick.	
October 14, 2016	(United States) Marco Farfan	LB	(United States) Portland Timbers 2	Signed for 2017 season. Signed as Homegrown Player.	

=== Loans in ===
Date	Player	Positions	Club loaned from	Fee/notes	Ref
March 10, 2016	(England) Jack Barmby	DF / MF / FW	(England) Leicester City	On loan until May 31, 2016. Released from Leicester, still with Portland as loan.	
October 19, 2016	(Colombia) Victor Arboleda	FW	(United States) Portland Timbers 2	USL affiliate short-term agreement	

=== Loans out ===
Date	Player	Positions	Destination club	Fee/notes	Ref
December 30, 2015	(England) Liam Ridgewell	CB	(England) Brighton & Hove Albion	Short Term Off-season Loan	
June 30, 2016	(Colombia) Dairon Asprilla	RW / LW / FW	(Colombia) Millonarios F.C.	1-year loan with option to buy	
September 7, 2016	(United States) Chris Klute	LB	(United States) Minnesota United FC	Loaned until end of season	

=== Transfers out ===
Date	Player	Positions	Destination club	Fee/notes	Ref
December 7, 2015	(United States) Andrew Weber	GK	N/A	Option Declined	
December 7, 2015	(Brazil) Jeanderson	DF	N/A	Option Declined	
December 7, 2015	(Argentina) Norberto Paparatto	DF	(Argentina) Atlético de Rafaela	Option Declined	
December 7, 2015	(United States) ~~Nick Besler~~	MF	N/A	Option Declined, re-signed	
December 7, 2015	(United States) Michael Nanchoff	MF	(United States) Tampa Bay Rowdies	Option declined	
December 7, 2015	(Argentina) Maximiliano Urruti	FW	(United States) FC Dallas	Option declined, taken by FC Dallas in 1st stage of re-entry draft.	
December 7, 2015	(United States) ~~Andy Thoma~~	DF	N/A	Option declined, re-signed	
December 11, 2015	(United States) Jorge Villafaña	DF	(Mexico) Santos Laguna	Undisclosed Fee	
December 18, 2015	(Canada) Will Johnson	MF	(Canada) Toronto FC	Targeted Allocation money and a 2017 second-round Superdraft pick	
January 29, 2016	(Costa Rica) Rodney Wallace	MF	(Portugal) FC Arouca	End of contract	
February 2, 2016	(United States) George Fochive	MF	(Denmark) Viborg FF	Undisclosed fee	
May 13, 2016	(Jamaica) Michael Seaton	FW	(Israel) Hapoel Ramat Gan Givatayim F.C.	Waived	
July 18, 2016	(Ghana) Adam Kawarsey	GK	(Norway) Rosenborg BK	Undisclosed fee	
August 2, 2016	(United States) Anthony Manning	DF		Waived	
September 17, 2016	(United States) Jack Jewsbury	DF / MF		Will retire following the 2016 season.	
October 18, 2016	(United States) Ned Grabavoy	MF		Will retire following the 2016 season.	

=== Contract extensions ===
Date	Player	Positions	Year with club (year signed)	Notes	Ref
March 3, 2016	(United States) Darlington Nagbe	CM / RW / FW	6 (2011)	Used Target Allocation Money to re-sign.	
March 3, 2016	(Colombia) Diego Chará	CDM	6 (2011)	Used Target Allocation Money to re-sign.	
March 14, 2016	(Nigeria) Fanendo Adi	CF	2 (2014)	Used Target Allocation Money to re-sign. 3-year extension.	
August 10, 2016	(Argentina) Diego Valeri	CAM	3 (2013)	Re-signed as Designated Player until 2019.	
September 1, 2016	(England) Liam Ridgewell	CB	2 (2014)	Re-signed using Target Allocation Money.	

=== 2015 MLS Re-Entry Draft picks ===
Stage (Round Pick)	Player	Positions	Previous club	Notes	Ref
1 (20)	PASS				
2 (20)	(Jamaica) Jermaine Taylor	RB / CB	(United States) Houston Dynamo		

The first stage of the 2015 MLS Re-Entry Draft took place on December 11, 2015.
The second stage of the 2015 MLS Re-Entry Draft took place on December 17, 2015.

=== 2016 MLS SuperDraft Picks ===
Round Pick (Overall)	Player	Positions	Previous club	Notes	Ref
1 (20)	Ben Polk	FW	(United States) Syracuse Orange		
2 (40)	Neco Brett	RW / FW	(United States) Robert Morris Colonials		
3 (61)	Wade Hamilton	GK	(United States) Cal Poly Mustangs		
4 (81)	Trevor Morley	DF	(United States) Cal State Northridge Matadors	Signed with Timbers 2.	

Rounds 1 and 2 of the draft were held on January 14, 2016.
Rounds 3 and 4 of the draft were held on January 19, 2016.

=== Staff in ===
Date	Name	Position	Previous club	Notes	Ref

=== Staff out ===
Date	Name	Position	Destination club	Notes	Ref

=== National Team Participation ===
Six Timbers players have been called up to play for their national teams during this season.

Player	Nation	# of Call ups	Ref
Fanendo Adi	Nigeria	1	
Darlington Nagbe	United States	3	
Adam Kawarsey	Ghana	1	
Darren Mattocks	Jamaica	1	
Alvas Powell	Jamaica	1	
Jermaine Taylor	Jamaica	1	

== Honors and awards ==
=== MLS Player of the Month ===
Month	Result	Player	Ref
April	Won	(Nigeria) Fanendo Adi	
June	Nominated	(Argentina) Diego Valeri	
July	Nominated	(New Zealand) Jake Gleeson	

=== MLS Player of the Week ===
Week	Result	Player	Ref
9	Won	(New Zealand) Jake Gleeson	
19	Won	(Argentina) Diego Valeri	

=== MLS Goal of the Week ===
Week	Result	Player	Ref
7	Nominated	(United States) Jack McInerney	
9	Nominated	(Argentina) Diego Valeri	
10	Nominated	(United States) Nat Borchers	
11	Nominated	(United States) Darlington Nagbe	
14	Nominated	(England) Liam Ridgewell	
15	Nominated	(Nigeria) Fanendo Adi	
19	Nominated	(Argentina) Diego Valeri	
22	Nominated	(Argentina) Diego Valeri	
26	Nominated	(Argentina) Diego Valeri	

=== MLS Save of the Week ===
Week	Result	Player	Ref
2	Nominated	(Ghana) Adam Kawarsey	
3	Nominated	(Ghana) Adam Kawarsey	
9	Nominated	(New Zealand) Jake Gleeson	
10	Nominated	(New Zealand) Jake Gleeson	
11	Nominated	(New Zealand) Jake Gleeson	
13	Nominated	(New Zealand) Jake Gleeson	
15	Won	(New Zealand) Jake Gleeson	
19	Nominated	(New Zealand) Jake Gleeson	
21	Nominated	(New Zealand) Jake Gleeson	
22	Nominated	(New Zealand) Jake Gleeson	
23	Nominated	(New Zealand) Jake Gleeson	
24	Nominated	(New Zealand) Jake Gleeson	
26	Nominated	(New Zealand) Jake Gleeson	

=== 2016 Club Awards ===
Award	Player	Note	Ref
Players' Player of the year	(Colombia) Diego Chará		
Supporters' Player of the Year	(Argentina) Diego Valeri		
Golden Boot	(Nigeria) Fanendo Adi	16 goals in 33 games played	
Unsung Hero	(United States) Jack Jewsbury		
Play of the Year	(Argentina) Diego Valeri	Diego Valeri's chip July 17 against Seattle Sounders FC	
Defender of the Year	(Colombia) Diego Chará		
Up-and-Coming Player of the Year	(England) Jack Barmby		
Community MVP	(United States) Zarek Valentin		

== Statistics ==
=== Appearances ===
No.	Pos.	Name	MLS				MLS Playoffs				U.S. Open Cup				Champions League				Total			
No.	Pos.	Name	Apps	Goals	Yellow card	Red card	Apps	Goals	Yellow card	Red card	Apps	Goals	Yellow card	Red card	Apps	Goals	Yellow card	Red card	Apps	Goals	Yellow card	Red card
1	GK	(United States) Chris Konopka	0	0	0	0	0	0	0	0	0	0	0	0	0	0	0	0	0	0	0	0
2	DF	(Jamaica) Alvas Powell	23	0	4	0	0	0	0	0	0	0	0	0	3	0	0	0	26	0	4	0
4	DF	(Jamaica) Jermaine Taylor	21 (2)	0	4	0	0	0	0	0	1	0	0	0	2	0	0	0	24 (2)	0	4	0
5	DF	(Lithuania) Vytautas Andriuškevičius	10 (1)	1	2	0	0	0	0	0	0	0	0	0	3	0	0	0	13 (1)	1	2	0
6	MF	(United States) Darlington Nagbe	28	1	1	0	0	0	0	0	1	0	0	0	2 (1)	1	0	0	31 (1)	2	1	0
7	DF	(United States) Nat Borchers	21	1	2	0	0	0	0	0	1	0	0	0	0	0	0	0	22	1	2	0
8	MF	(Argentina) Diego Valeri	30	14	3	1	0	0	0	0	1 (1)	0	0	0	3	2	1	0	34 (1)	16	4	1
9	FW	(Nigeria) Fanendo Adi	30 (3)	16	7	0	0	0	0	0	0 (1)	0	0	0	2 (1)	2	2	0	32 (5)	18	8	0
10	MF	(United States) Ned Grabavoy	5 (16)	0	3	0	0	0	0	0	1 (1)	0	0	0	4	0	0	0	10 (17)	0	3	0
12	DF	(Nigeria) Gbenga Arokoyo	0 (1)	0	0	0	0	0	0	0	0	0	0	0	0	0	0	0	0 (1)	0	0	0
13	MF	(United States) Jack Jewsbury	17 (5)	1	4	0	0	0	0	0	2	0	1	0	1	0	0	0	20 (5)	1	5	0
14	MF	(United States) Ben Zemanski	11 (5)	0	2	0	0	0	0	0	1	0	0	0	2	0	0	0	14 (5)	0	2	0
16	DF	(United States) Zarek Valentin	18 (2)	1	2	0	0	0	0	0	2	0	0	0	2	0	0	0	22 (2)	1	2	0
17	MF	(United States) Nick Besler	0	0	0	0	0	0	0	0	0	0	0	0	0	0	0	0	0	0	0	0
18	DF	(United States) Amobi Okugo	2 (2)	0	0	0	0	0	0	0	1	0	0	0	1 (1)	0	0	0	4 (3)	0	0	0
19	FW	(England) Ben Polk	0	0	0	0	0	0	0	0	0	0	0	0	0	0	0	0	0	0	0	0
20	DF	(United States) Taylor Peay	1 (1)	0	0	0	0	0	0	0	2	0	1	0	0	0	0	0	3 (1)	0	1	0
21	MF	(Colombia) Diego Chará	30	0	7	1	0	0	0	0	0	0	0	0	4	0	1	0	34	0	8	1
22	FW	(Jamaica) Darren Mattocks	12 (7)	1	0	0	0	0	0	0	1 (1)	0	0	0	0 (2)	0	0	0	13 (10)	1	0	0
23	MF	(England) Jack Barmby	2 (16)	1	1	0	0	0	0	0	2	0	0	0	1 (2)	0	0	0	5 (18)	1	1	0
24	DF	(England) Liam Ridgewell	22	1	6	0	0	0	0	0	1	0	0	0	2	0	1	0	25	1	7	0
25	MF	(Jamaica) Neco Brett	0 (1)	0	0	0	0	0	0	0	0 (1)	0	0	0	0	0	0	0	0 (2)	0	0	0
26	FW	(Argentina) Lucas Melano	27 (4)	3	1	0	0	0	0	0	0 (1)	0	0	0	2 (1)	0	1	0	29 (6)	3	2	0
27	DF	(England) Steven Taylor	9	1	0	0	0	0	0	0	0	0	0	0	3	0	1	0	12	1	1	0
28	DF	(United States) Andy Thoma	0	0	0	0	0	0	0	0	0	0	0	0	0	0	0	0	0	0	0	0
33	GK	(United States) Wade Hamilton	0	0	0	0	0	0	0	0	1	0	0	0	0	0	0	0	1	0	0	0
73	FW	(Colombia) Victor Arboleda	0	0	0	0	0	0	0	0	0	0	0	0	0 (1)	0	0	0	0 (1)	0	0	0
90	GK	(New Zealand) Jake Gleeson	26 (1)	0	1	0	0	0	0	0	1	0	0	0	4	0	0	0	31 (1)	0	1	0
99	FW	(United States) Jack McInerney	8 (16)	5	1	0	0	0	0	0	2	1	0	0	3 (1)	2	2	0	13 (17)	8	3	0
Players who were transferred/waived from the club during active season or on loan
11	MF	(Colombia) Dairon Asprilla	6 (3)	1	1	1	0	0	0	0	1	1	0	0	0	0	0	0	7 (3)	2	1	1
12	GK	(Ghana) Adam Kawarsey	7	0	0	0	0	0	0	0	0	0	0	0	0	0	0	0	7	0	0	0
15	DF	(United States) Chris Klute	9	0	1	0	0	0	0	0	0	0	0	0	0	0	0	0	9	0	1	0
31	FW	(Jamaica) Michael Seaton	0	0	0	0	0	0	0	0	0	0	0	0	0	0	0	0	0	0	0	0
35	DF	(United States) Anthony Manning	0	0	0	0	0	0	0	0	0	0	0	0	0	0	0	0	0	0	0	0

Last updated: October 23, 2016.
Source: Portland Timbers

=== Goalkeeper stats ===
The list is sorted by total minutes played then by jersey number.

No.	Player	MLS				MLS Playoffs				U.S. Open Cup				Champions League				Total			
No.	Player	MIN	GA	GAA	SV	MIN	GA	GAA	SV	MIN	GA	GAA	SV	MIN	GA	GAA	SV	MIN	GA	GAA	SV
90	(New Zealand) Jake Gleeson	2470	38	1.38	111	0	0	0.00	0	90	0	0.00	0	360	7	1.75	12	2920	45	1.39	123
12	(Ghana) Adam Kwarasey	590	13	1.98	19	0	0	0.00	0	0	0	0.00	0	0	0	0.00	0	590	13	1.98	19
33	(United States) Wade Hamilton	0	0	0.00	0	0	0	0.00	0	90	1	1.00	2	0	0	0.00	0	90	1	1.00	2
1	(United States) Chris Konopka	0	0	0.00	0	0	0	0.00	0	0	0	0.00	0	0	0	0.00	0	0	0	0.00	0
	TOTALS	3060	51	1.50	130	0	0	0.00	0	180	1	0.50	2	360	7	1.75	12	3600	59	1.48	144

Last updated: October 23, 2016.
Source: Portland Timbers

=== Line-up ===
As of October 23, 2016.

Visual

Formation: 4-2-3-1

Most recent starting line-up

No.	Pos.	Nat.	Name	MS	Notes
90	GK	(New Zealand)	Jake Gleeson	32	(Note: Adam Kawarsey has 7 starts.) (Note: Wade Hamilton has 1 start.)
2	RB	(Jamaica)	Alvas Powell	26	(Note: Taylor Peay has 3 starts.)
27	CB	(England)	Steven Taylor	12	(Note: Nat Borchers has 22 starts.)
4	CB	(Jamaica)	Jermaine Taylor	24	(Note: Amobi Okugo has 4 starts.) (Note: Liam Ridgewell has 25 starts.)
5	LB	(Lithuania)	Vytautas Andriuskevicius	13	(Note: Chris Klute has 9 starts.) (Note: Zarek Valentin has 21 starts.)
10	DM	(United States)	Jack Jewsbury	20	(Note: Ned Grabavoy has 10 starts.)
6	DM	(United States)	Darlington Nagbe	31	(Note: Ben Zemanski has 14 starts.) (Note: Diego Chará has 34 starts.)
26	RM	(Argentina)	Lucas Melano	29	(Note: Dairon Asprilla has 7 starts.)
8	CM	(Argentina)	Diego Valeri (c)	34	(Note: Jack Barmby has 5 starts.)
22	LM	(Jamaica)	Darren Mattocks	13	(Note: Jack McInerney has 13 starts.)
9	CF	(Nigeria)	Fanendo Adi	32	

Previous starters

=== Top scorers ===
The list is sorted by shirt number when total goals are equal.

Rnk	Pos	No.	Player	MLS	MLS Cup Playoffs	U.S. Open Cup	Champions League	Total
1	FW	9	(Nigeria) Fanendo Adi	16	0	0	2	18
2	MF	8	(Argentina) Diego Valeri	14	0	0	2	16
3	FW	99	(United States) Jack McInerney	5	0	1	2	8
4	DF	26	(Argentina) Lucas Melano	3	0	0	0	3
5	MF	6	(United States) Darlington Nagbe	1	0	0	1	2
5	MF	11	(Colombia) Dairon Asprilla	1	0	1	0	2
8	DF	5	(Lithuania) Vytautas Andriuškevičius	1	0	0	0	1
8	DF	13	(United States) Jack Jewsbury	1	0	0	0	1
8	DF	16	(United States) Zarek Valentin	1	0	0	0	1
8	DF	17	(United States) Nat Borchers	1	0	0	0	1
8	FW	22	(Jamaica) Darren Mattocks	1	0	0	0	1
8	FW	23	(England) Jack Barmby	1	0	0	0	1
8	DF	24	(England) Liam Ridgewell	1	0	0	0	1
8	DF	27	(England) Steven Taylor	1	0	0	0	1
Own goals				0	0	0	0	0
TOTALS				48	0	2	7	57

Last updated: October 23, 2016.
Source: Portland Timbers

=== Top assists ===
The list is sorted by shirt number when total assists are equal.

Rnk	Pos	No.	Player	MLS	MLS Cup Playoffs	U.S. Open Cup	Champions League	Total
1	MF	8	(Argentina) Diego Valeri	7	0	0	1	8
2	MF	6	(United States) Darlington Nagbe	5	0	0	0	5
2	MF	26	(Argentina) Lucas Melano	5	0	0	0	5
3	MF	8	(Nigeria) Fanendo Adi	2	0	0	2	4
4	DF	4	(Jamaica) Jermaine Taylor	3	0	0	0	3
4	FW	22	(Jamaica) Darren Mattocks	3	0	0	0	3
6	MF	13	(United States) Jack Jewsbury	2	0	0	0	2
6	DF	17	(United States) Zarek Valentin	1	0	0	1	2
8	DF	2	(Jamaica) Alvas Powell	1	0	0	0	1
8	DF	7	(United States) Nat Borchers	1	0	0	0	1
8	MF	14	(United States) Ben Zemanski	1	0	0	0	1
8	MF	21	(Colombia) Diego Chará	1	0	0	0	1
8	MF	23	(England) Jack Barmby	0	0	0	1	1
8	FW	99	(United States) Jack McInerney	0	0	1	0	1
TOTALS				32	0	1	5	38

Last updated: October 23, 2016.
Source: Portland Timbers

=== Clean sheets ===
The list is sorted by shirt number when total clean sheets are equal.

Rnk	No.	Player	MLS	MLS Cup Playoffs	U.S. Open Cup	Champions League	Total
1	90	(New Zealand) Jake Gleeson	6	0	1	0	7
2	1	(United States) Chris Konopka	0	0	0	0	0
2	12	(Ghana) Adam Kawarsey	0	0	0	0	0
2	33	(United States) Wade Hamilton	0	0	0	0	0
TOTALS			6	0	1	0	7

Last updated: October 23, 2016.
Source: Portland Timbers

=== Summary ===
Games played	40 (34 Major League Soccer) (2 U.S. Open Cup) (4 Champions League)
Games won	14 (12 Major League Soccer) (1 U.S. Open Cup) (2 Champions League)
Games drawn	9 (8 Major League Soccer) (1 Champions League)
Games lost	16 (14 Major League Soccer) (1 U.S. Open Cup) (1 Champions League)
Goals scored	57 (48 Major League Soccer) (2 U.S. Open Cup) (7 Champions League)
Goals conceded	61 (53 Major League Soccer) (1 U.S. Open Cup) (7 Champions League)
Goal difference	-4 (-5 Major League Soccer) (+1 U.S. Open Cup) (0 Champions League)
Clean sheets	7 (6 Major League Soccer) (1 U.S. Open Cup)
Yellow cards	63 (52 Major League Soccer) (2 U.S. Open Cup) (9 Champions League)
Red cards	3 (3 Major League Soccer)
Most appearances	(Nigeria) Fanendo Adi (37 Appearances)
Top scorer	(Nigeria) Fanendo Adi (18 goals)
Top assists	(Argentina) Diego Valeri (8 assists)
Top clean sheets	(New Zealand) Jake Gleeson (7 clean sheets)
Winning percentage	Overall: 15/40 (37.50%)

Last updated: October 23, 2016.
Source: Portland Timbers
