= 2018 Dallas Cup =

2018 Dallas Cup (Supergroup)
Tournament details
- Country: United States
- Dates: 25 March – 1 April
- Teams: 12

Final positions
- Champions: (Mexico) Tigres UANL
- Runners-up: (England) Arsenal

Tournament statistics
- Matches played: 21
- Goals scored: 71 (3.38 per match)

The 2018 Dallas Cup, known as the Dr Pepper Dallas Cup for sponsorship reasons, was the thirty-ninth edition of a youth football competition held in the United States. Competitions were held at every age from U13s to U19s. The U14 and U19 levels also had additional competitions, known as the U14s UDN and the Gordon Jago Supergroup respectively.

== Gordon Jago Supergroup ==
=== Participants ===
Association	Team (Berth)
AFC; 1 berth	(Japan) Higashi Fukuoka
CONCACAF; 6 berths	(United States) Atlanta United
CONCACAF; 6 berths	(United States) FC Dallas
CONCACAF; 6 berths	(Mexico) Monterrey
CONCACAF; 6 berths	(Mexico) Querétaro
CONCACAF; 6 berths	(Mexico) Tigres UANL
CONCACAF; 6 berths	(Canada) Toronto FC III
CONMEBOL; 2 berths	(Brazil) Red Bull Brasil
CONMEBOL; 2 berths	(Brazil) Vitória
UEFA; 3 berths	(England) Arsenal
UEFA; 3 berths	(England) Manchester United
UEFA; 3 berths	(Spain) Real Oviedo

Dallas Cup

=== Matches ===
==== Group A ====
Pos	Team	Pld	W	D	L	GF	GA	GD	Pts	Qualification
1	(England) Manchester United	3	2	1	0	11	2	+9	7	Advance to knockout stage
2	(Mexico) Tigres UANL	3	2	1	0	9	3	+6	7	Advance to knockout stage
3	(Canada) Toronto FC III	3	1	0	2	4	8	−4	3	
4	(Japan) Higashi Fukuoka	3	0	0	3	2	13	−11	0	

Source: Dallas Cup
25 March

Higashi Fukuoka (Japan)	2–3	(Canada) Toronto FC III
	Report

Richland College, Lake Highlands
25 March

Manchester United (England)	2–2	(Mexico) Tigres UANL
	Report

Cotton Bowl, Fair Park

26 March

Toronto FC III (Canada)	0–1	(England) Manchester United
	Report

MoneyGram Park, Irving
26 March

Tigres UANL (Mexico)	2–0	(Japan) Higashi Fukuoka
	Report

Richland College, Lake Highlands

28 March

Tigres UANL (Mexico)	5–1	(Canada) Toronto FC III
	Report

MoneyGram Park, Irving
28 March

Manchester United (England)	8–0	(Japan) Higashi Fukuoka
	Report

Cotton Bowl, Fair Park

==== Group B ====
Pos	Team	Pld	W	D	L	GF	GA	GD	Pts	Qualification
1	(Mexico) Monterrey	3	3	0	0	8	5	+3	9	Advance to knockout stage
2	(Brazil) Vitória	3	1	1	1	8	3	+5	4	
3	(Spain) Real Oviedo	3	1	0	2	6	11	−5	3	
4	(United States) Atlanta United	3	0	1	2	3	6	−3	1	

Source: Dallas Cup
25 March

Real Oviedo (Spain)	3–1	(United States) Atlanta United
	Report

MoneyGram Park, Irving
25 March

Monterrey (Mexico)	2–1	(Brazil) Vitória
	Report

Cotton Bowl, Fair Park

26 March

Vitória (Brazil)	0–0	(United States) Atlanta United
	Report

MoneyGram Park, Irving
26 March

Real Oviedo (Spain)	2–3	(Mexico) Monterrey
	Report

Richland College, Lake Highlands

28 March

Atlanta United (United States)	2–3	(Mexico) Monterrey
	Report

MoneyGram Park, Irving
28 March

Vitória (Brazil)	7–1	(Spain) Real Oviedo
	Report

Cotton Bowl, Fair Park

==== Group C ====
Pos	Team	Pld	W	D	L	GF	GA	GD	Pts	Qualification
1	(England) Arsenal	3	1	2	0	3	2	+1	5	Advance to knockout stage
2	(Mexico) Querétaro	3	1	2	0	2	1	+1	5	
3	(United States) FC Dallas	3	0	2	1	3	4	−1	2	
4	(Brazil) Red Bull Brasil	3	0	2	1	2	3	−1	2	

Source: Dallas Cup
25 March

Red Bull Brasil (Brazil)	0–1	(Mexico) Querétaro
	Report

Richland College, Lake Highlands
25 March

Arsenal (England)	2–1	(United States) FC Dallas
	Report

Cotton Bowl, Fair Park

26 March

Querétaro (Mexico)	0–0	(England) Arsenal
	Report

MoneyGram Park, Irving
26 March

FC Dallas (United States)	1–1	(Brazil) Red Bull Brasil
	Report

MoneyGram Park, Irving

28 March

Querétaro (Mexico)	1–1	(United States) FC Dallas
	Report

MoneyGram Park, Irving
28 March

Arsenal (England)	1–1	(Brazil) Red Bull Brasil
	Report

Cotton Bowl, Fair Park

==== Knockout stage ====
Semi-finals
30 March – Toyota Stadium
(Mexico) Monterrey	1
(Mexico) Tigres UANL	4
30 March – Toyota Stadium
(England) Manchester United	2 (2)
(England) Arsenal	2 (3)

Final
1 April – Toyota Stadium
(Mexico) Tigres UANL	1
(England) Arsenal	0

Semi-finals

30 March

Monterrey (Mexico)	1–4	(Mexico) Tigres UANL
	Report

Toyota Stadium, Frisco
30 March

Manchester United (England)	2–2 (a.e.t.)	(England) Arsenal
	Report
Penalties
	2–3

Toyota Stadium, Frisco

Final

1 April

Tigres UANL (Mexico)	1–0	(England) Arsenal
	Report

Toyota Stadium, Frisco
Referee: Jaime Herrera (El Salvador)

=== Media coverage ===
Market	Countries	Broadcast partner	Ref
International	195	Facebook (English) (selected games)	
United States	1	UDN (Spanish) (selected games)	
Total countries	195		

== Overall winners ==
Group	Winner
U13s	(United States) FC Dallas
U14s	(Mexico) Ángeles Soccer Elite
U14s; UDN	(Mexico) Tigres UANL
U15s	(United States) Chicago Fire
U16s	(Mexico) Querétaro
U17s	(Japan) Maebashi Ikuei
U18s	(United States) Santa Clara Sporting
U19s	(United States) Golden State White 99
U19s; Supergroup	(Mexico) Tigres UANL

Dallas Cup
