= 2013 Dallas Cup =

Tournament details
- Country: United States

The 2013 Dallas Cup was the 34th since its establishment. The Dallas Cup is an international soccer tournament for invited youth teams, held annually in Dallas, Texas, United States. Twelve teams participated in the 2013 tournament. The competition was sponsored by Dr Pepper.

== Participating teams ==
From AFC:

- (Japan) Kashiwa Reysol

From CONCACAF:

- (Mexico) Tigres
- (Mexico) Club América
- (United States) Dallas Texans
- (United States) L.A. Galaxy
- (Canada) Toronto FC

From CONMEBOL:

- (Brazil) Coritiba FC
- (Brazil) Fluminense FC

From UEFA:

- (England) Manchester United
- (England) Fulham F.C.
- (Germany) Eintracht Frankfurt
- (Denmark) AaB Fodbold

== Standings ==
Teams qualified for next round
Teams eliminated from tournament

=== Group A ===
Team	Pld	W	D	L	GF	GA	GD	Pts
(Japan) Kashiwa Reysol	3	3	0	0	8	1	+7	9
(England) Manchester United	3	2	0	1	5	3	+2	6
(Mexico) Club América	3	1	0	2	3	8	−5	3
(United States) Dallas Texans	3	0	0	3	2	6	−4	0

March 24

Kashiwa Reysol (Japan)	1–0	(United States) Dallas Texans

March 24

Manchester United (England)	2–0	(Mexico) Club América

March 25

Dallas Texans (United States)	1–3	(England) Manchester United

March 25

Kashiwa Reysol (Japan)	5–1	(Mexico) Club América
Ohshima; Shirai; Horikoshi

March 27

Manchester United (England)	0–2	(Japan) Kashiwa Reysol
		Ohshima; Mugikura

March 27

Club América (Mexico)	2–1	(United States) Dallas Texans

=== Group B ===
Team	Pld	W	D	L	GF	GA	GD	Pts
(England) Fulham F.C.	3	3	0	0	10	2	+8	9
(Brazil) Coritiba FC	3	2	0	1	7	7	0	6
(United States) L.A. Galaxy	3	1	0	2	5	6	−1	3
(Germany) Eintracht Frankfurt	3	0	0	3	3	10	−7	0

March 24

Coritiba FC (Brazil)	1–3	(England) Fulham F.C.

March 24

Eintracht Frankfurt (Germany)	1–2	(United States) L.A. Galaxy

March 25

Coritiba FC (Brazil)	3–2	(Germany) Eintracht Frankfurt

March 25

Fulham F.C. (England)	2–1	(United States) L.A. Galaxy

March 27

Fulham F.C. (England)	5–0	(Germany) Eintracht Frankfurt

March 27

L.A. Galaxy (United States)	2–3	(Brazil) Coritiba FC

=== Group C ===
Team	Pld	W	D	L	GF	GA	GD	Pts
(Brazil) Fluminense FC	3	2	1	0	5	1	+4	7
(Denmark) AaB Fodbold	3	2	1	0	4	1	+3	7
(Canada) Toronto FC	3	0	1	2	2	5	−3	1
(Mexico) Tigres	3	0	1	2	2	6	−4	1

March 24

AaB Fodbold (Denmark)	2–0	(Canada) Toronto FC

March 24

Fluminense FC (Brazil)	3–0	(Mexico) Tigres

March 25

Fluminense FC (Brazil)	1–1	(Denmark) AaB Fodbold

March 25

Tigres (Mexico)	2–2	(Canada) Toronto FC

March 27

Toronto FC (Canada)	0–1	(Brazil) Fluminense FC

March 27

AaB Fodbold (Denmark)	1–0	(Mexico) Tigres

== Semifinal ==
March 29

Kashiwa Reysol (Japan)	4–0	(Denmark) AaB Fodbold
Miyazawa; Ohshima

March 29

Fulham F.C. (England)	2–1	(Brazil) Fluminense FC

Referee: Matt Conger (New Zealand)

== Championship ==
March 31

Kashiwa Reysol (Japan)	1–5	(England) Fulham F.C.

Referee: Ricardo Montero (Costa Rica)
