= Alex dos Santos (footballer) =

Brazilian footballer (born 1981)

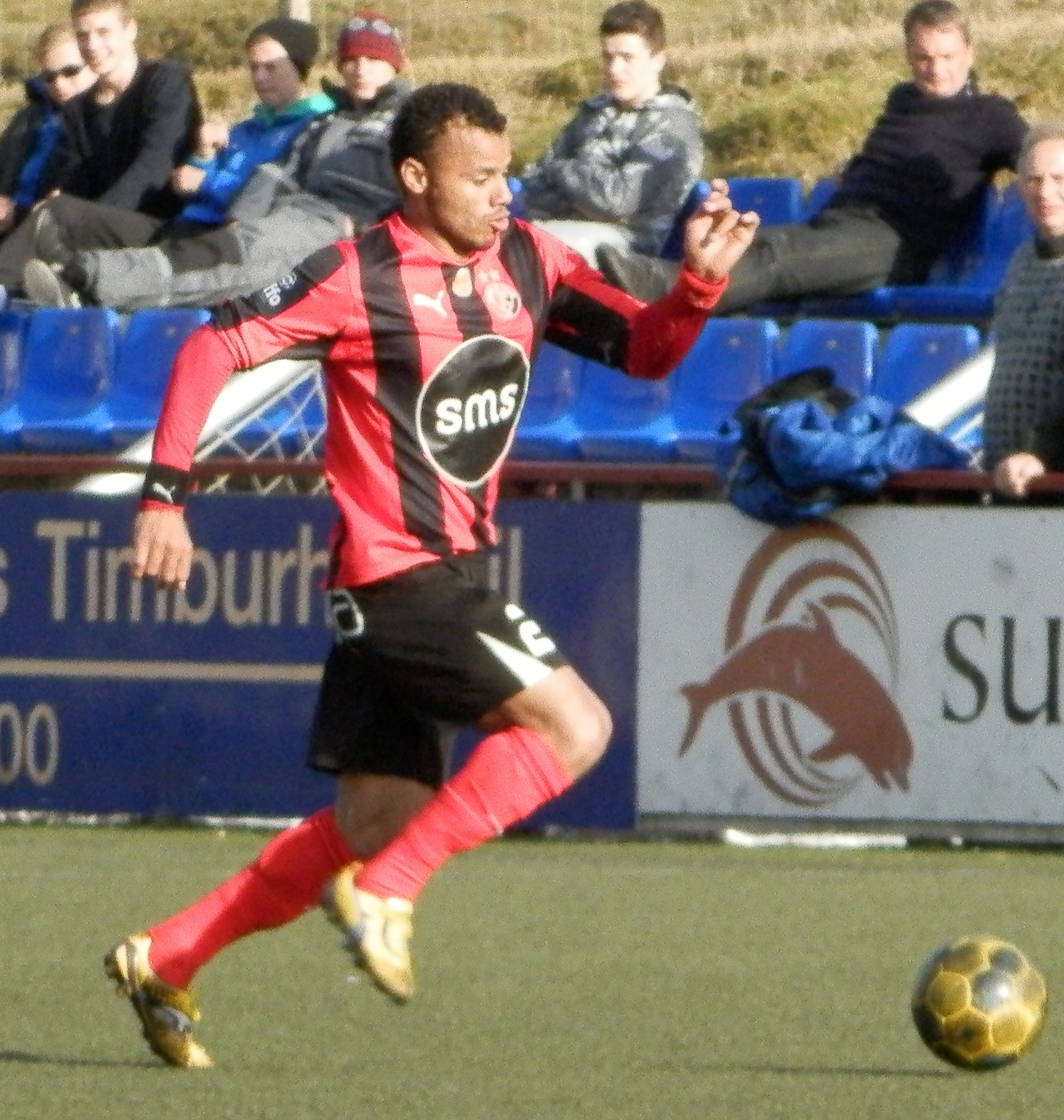
- Dos Santos in 2012

Personal information
- Full name: Alex José dos Santos
- Date of birth: 28 March 1981 (age 44)
- Place of birth: Itajuípe, Brazil
- Height: 1.70 m (5 ft 7 in)
- Position(s): Defender; midfielder

Senior career*
| Years | Team | Apps | (Gls) |
| 2002–2003 | SFC Opava | | |
| 2003–2004 | Boldklubben Frem | 2 | (0) |
| 2004–2008 | B36 Tórshavn | 152 | (13) |
| 2009–2011 | EB/Streymur | 82 | (13) |
| 2012–2015 | HB Tórshavn | 97 | (6) |
| 2016–2019 | Ítróttarfelag Fuglafjarðar | 53 | (1) |
- * Club domestic league appearances and goals

Alex José dos Santos (born 28 March 1981) is a Brazilian former professional footballer who played as a defender and midfielder.

== Career ==
In 2002–03, dos Santos played for SFC Opava, where he one scored a goal from 40 meters and helped achieve promotion to the Czech top flight.

In 2003, he signed for Boldklubben Frem in the Danish top flight. However, dos Santos only made two league appearances there and was substituted out in his second game despite being substituted on earlier. Even though dos Santos expressed desire to return to Brazil, Boldklubben Frem arranged a transfer to Faroese club B36 Tórshavn for the 2004 season, where he found difficulty adapting to the boat trips for games. At the end of the 2004 season, he went back to Brazil but eventually resigned with B36 Tórshavn where he played for five seasons. After that, dos Santos played for Faroese outfits EB/Streymur, HB Tórshavn as well as Ítróttarfelag Fuglafjarðar, where he stayed for four seasons. He won the Faroese championship with B36 Tórshavn in 2005 and with HB Tórshavn in 2013.

== Personal life ==
dos Santos since have a Faroese passport and is married to a Faroese wife, and together, they have two daughters.
