= Luis Bonilla (footballer) =

Colombian footballer (born 1997)

Personal information
- Full name: Luis Fernando Bonilla Ramírez
- Date of birth: 19 September 1997 (age 29)
- Place of birth: Cauca, Colombia
- Height: 1.74 m (5 ft 9 in)
- Position: Midfielder

Team information
- Current team: Saltillo F.C. (on loan from UANL)

Senior career*
Years	Team	Apps	(Gls)
2017–	UANL	0	(0)
2018	→ Patriotas Boyacá (loan)	9	(0)
2019	→ Atlético Reynosa (loan)	4	(0)
2019–	→ Saltillo (loan)	1	(0)
- * Club domestic league appearances and goals as of 19:57, 19 August 2019 (UTC)

Luis Fernando Bonilla Ramírez (born 19 September 1997) is a Colombian footballer who currently plays as a midfielder for Saltillo F.C., on loan from UANL.

== Career statistics ==
=== Club ===
As of 15 April 2019.

Club	Season	League			Cup		Continental		Other		Total	
Club	Season	Division	Apps	Goals	Apps	Goals	Apps	Goals	Apps	Goals	Apps	Goals
UANL	2017–18	Liga MX	0	0	1 (Note: Appearances in the Copa MX)	0	0	0	0	0	1	0
UANL	2018–19	Liga MX	0	0	0	0	0	0	0	0	0	0
UANL	Total		0	0	1	0	0	0	0	0	1	0
Patriotas Boyacá (loan)	2018	Categoría Primera A	9	0	2 (Note: Appearances in the Copa Colombia)	0	–		0	0	11	0
Atlético Reynosa (loan)	2018–19	Liga Premier - Serie A	4	0	0	0	–		0	0	4	0
Saltillo F.C. (loan)	2019–20	Liga Premier - Serie A	1	0	0	0	–		0	0	1	0
Career total			14	0	3	0	0	0	0	0	16	0
