= Henrique Vermudt =

Brazilian footballer (born 1999)

Personal information
- Date of birth: 25 February 1999 (age 27)
- Place of birth: Cascavel, Brazil
- Height: 1.85 m (6 ft 1 in)
- Positions: Centre-back; defensive midfielder

Team information
- Current team: Botafogo

Youth career
- Coritiba

Senior career*
Years	Team	Apps	(Gls)
2019–2022	Coritiba	8	(0)
2022–	Botafogo	1	(0)
2023	→ Santo André (loan)	10	(0)
2024	→ Ferroviário (loan)	4	(0)
- * Club domestic league appearances and goals as of 24 December 2023

Henrique Vermudt (born 25 February 1999) is a Brazilian professional footballer who plays as a centre-back or defensive midfielder for Campeonato Brasileiro Série A club Botafogo.
