= Alex Santos (footballer) =

Brazilian footballer (born 1993)

Personal information
- Full name: Alex Santos Araújo
- Date of birth: 19 December 1993 (age 32)
- Place of birth: Grajaú, Brazil
- Height: 1.73 m (5 ft 8 in)
- Position: Forward

Youth career
- –2012: Coritiba

Senior career*
Years	Team	Apps	(Gls)
2012	Coritiba	3	(0)
2013	→ Red Bull Brasil (loan)	0	(0)
2014	→ AFC United (loan)	22	(8)
2015–2017	Guaratinguetá	15	(1)
2017	Foz do Iguaçu	6	(1)
2018	Cordino	1	(0)
2020	Potiguar	1	(0)
2021	Aquidauanense	2	(0)
2022	Maruinense	7	(0)
- * Club domestic league appearances and goals as of 11:29, 11 April 2023 (UTC)

Alex Santos Araújo (born 19 December 1993), commonly known as Alex Santos or just Alex, is a Brazilian professional footballer who plays as a forward.

== Career ==
=== Coritiba ===
Alex Santos made his senior league debut for Coritiba on 8 July 2012 in his side's 3–1 loss to São Paulo.

==== Red Bull Brasil ====
On 31 July 2013, Alex Santos joined Red Bull Brasil on loan. He made his debut on 31 August 2013, playing the whole match in his side's 1–0 loss to Itunao in the Copa Paulista.

==== AFC United ====
On 14 February 2014, Alex Santos joined AFC United on loan. He made his league debut on 4 May 2014, playing the whole match in his side's 1–0 win over Huddinge.

=== Guaratinguetá ===
In August 2015, Alex Santos joined Campeonato Brasileiro Série C side Guaratinguetá. He made his debut on 5 September, playing 59 minutes in his side's 2–1 win over Londrina.

== Career statistics ==
As of 29 October 2015

Appearances and goals by club, season and competition
Club	Season	League			Cup		League Cup		Other^{[A]}		Total	
Club	Season	Division	Apps	Goals	Apps	Goals	Apps	Goals	Apps	Goals	Apps	Goals
Coritiba	2012	Série A	3	0	0	0	0	0	0	0	3	0
Coritiba	2013	Série A	0	0	0	0	0	0	0	0	0	0
Red Bull Brasil	2013	Campeonato Paulista Série A2	0	0	0	0	0	0	3	0	3	0
AFC United	2014	Swedish Division 1	22	8	4	0	0	0	0	0	26	8
Guaratinguetá	2015	Campeonato Brasileiro Série C	3	0	0	0	0	0	0	0	3	0
Career total			28	8	4	0	0	0	3	0	35	8

A. The "Other" column constitutes appearances and goals (including those as a substitute) in the Copa Paulista
