= 2024 Portland Timbers season =

Portland Timbers
2024 season
- General manager: Ned Grabavoy
- Head coach: Phil Neville
- Stadium: Providence Park; Portland, Oregon (Capacity: 25,218)
- Major League Soccer: Conference: 9th Overall: 15th
- MLS Cup playoffs: Wild card
- Leagues Cup: Round of 32
- Top goalscorer: Jonathan Rodríguez (16)
- Average home league attendance: 21,949

The 2024 Portland Timbers season was the 38th season in their existence and the 14th season for the Portland Timbers in Major League Soccer (MLS), the top-flight professional soccer league in the United States and Canada. The Timbers finished ninth in the Western Conference and won the Cascadia Cup. The team qualified for the wild card round of the 2024 MLS Cup Playoffs, where they were eliminated by Vancouver Whitecaps FC.

== Background ==
After the end of the 2023 season, Phil Neville was named the head coach going into the 2024 season.

== Competitions ==
=== Major League Soccer ===
==== MLS Regular season ====
===== Western Conference =====
Pos	Team	Pld	W	L	T	GF	GA	GD	Pts	Qualification
7	Colorado Rapids	34	15	14	5	61	60	+1	50	MLS Cup Round One
8	Vancouver Whitecaps FC	34	13	13	8	52	49	+3	47	MLS Cup Wild Card
9	Portland Timbers	34	12	11	11	65	56	+9	47	MLS Cup Wild Card
10	Austin FC	34	11	14	9	39	48	−9	42	
11	FC Dallas	34	11	15	8	54	56	−2	41	

Source: MLS
Rules for classification: 1) points; 2) total wins; 3) total goal differential; 4) total goals scored; 5) fewer disciplinary points; 6) away goal differential; 7) away goals scored; 8) home goals differential; 9) home goals scored; 10) coin toss (2 clubs tied) or drawing of lots (≥3 clubs tied)

===== Overall standings =====
Pos	Team	Pld	W	L	T	GF	GA	GD	Pts	Qualification
13	New York City FC	34	14	12	8	54	49	+5	50	
14	Vancouver Whitecaps FC	34	13	13	8	52	49	+3	47	CONCACAF Champions Cup
15	Portland Timbers	34	12	11	11	65	56	+9	47	
16	New York Red Bulls	34	11	9	14	55	50	+5	47	
17	CF Montréal	34	11	13	10	48	64	−16	43	

Source: MLS
Rules for classification: 1) points; 2) total wins; 3) total goal differential; 4) total goals scored; 5) fewer disciplinary points; 6) away goal differential; 7) away goals scored; 8) home goals differential; 9) home goals scored; 10) coin toss (2 clubs tied) or drawing of lots (≥3 clubs tied)

===== Matches =====
Win Draw Loss Upcoming fixture

February 24 1	Portland Timbers	4−1	Colorado Rapids	Portland, Oregon
19:30 PST	Williamson 9'; Antony 14', 29'; Paredes (yellow card) 45'; Vines 45+5' (o.g.); Miller (yellow card) 49'	Report	Bombito (yellow card) 45+4'; Harris 55'; Maxsø (yellow card) 59'; Mihailovic (yellow card) 75'	Stadium: Providence Park; Attendance: 21,411; Referee: Aleksandar Zhelyazkov

March 2 2	Portland Timbers	2–2	D.C. United	Portland, Oregon
19:30 PST	Chará (yellow card) 7'; Asprilla 18'; Crépeau (yellow card) 59'; Moreno 61'; McGraw (yellow card) 68'	Report	Klich (yellow card) 62', (goal) 72' (pen.); Fletcher 82'; Herrera (yellow card) 90+1'	Stadium: Providence Park; Attendance: 20,221; Referee: Trevor Wiseman

March 9 3	New York City FC	1–2	Portland Timbers	New York, New York
11:00 PST	Rodríguez 10', (yellow card) 76'	Report	McGraw (yellow card) 19'; Paredes (yellow card) 31'; Antony 85'; Evander 90+7'	Stadium: Yankee Stadium; Attendance: 24,774; Referee: Esteban Rosano

March 16 4	Houston Dynamo FC	1–0	Portland Timbers	Houston, Texas
17:30 PDT	Aliyu 43'; Dorsey (yellow card) 52'; Kowalczyk (yellow card) 70'; Artur (yellow card) 80'	Report	Župarić (yellow card) 57'; Miller (yellow card) 64'	Stadium: Shell Energy Stadium; Attendance: 16,003; Referee: Erick Lezama Pavon

March 23 5	Portland Timbers	1–3	Philadelphia Union	Portland, Oregon
19:30 PDT	Chará (yellow card) 25'; Rodríguez 80'	Report	Carranza 28', 67'; Sullivan (yellow card) 32', (goal) 58'; Elliott (yellow card) 40'; Semmle (yellow card) 88'	Stadium: Providence Park; Attendance: 23,046; Referee: Cristian Campo Hernandez

March 30 6 Cascadia Cup	Vancouver Whitecaps FC	3–2	Portland Timbers	Vancouver, British Columbia
19:30 PDT	Gauld 2'; Picault 29'; Cubas (yellow card) 51'; Raposo 87'; Adekugbe (yellow card) 90'	Report	Evander 52'; Mora 78'	Stadium: BC Place; Attendance: 24,693; Referee: Allen Chapman

April 7 7	Sporting Kansas City	3–3	Portland Timbers	Kansas City, Kansas
10:30 PDT	Agada 13', 45+3'; Rosero (yellow card) 25', (goal) 38'; Rodríguez (yellow card) 48'; Davis (yellow card) 90+8'	Report	K. Miller (yellow card) 34'; Evander 64'; Mora 66'; E. Miller 81', (yellow card) 82'	Stadium: Children's Mercy Park; Attendance: 17,424; Referee: Armando Villarreal

April 13 8	Portland Timbers	2–2	Los Angeles FC	Portland, Oregon
13:45 PDT	Mora 11', (yellow card) 14'; Evander 34', (yellow card) 40'; Crépeau (red card) 48'	Report	Bogusz 21', 51', (yellow card) 76'; Palencia (yellow card) 44'; Bouanga (yellow card) 45+3'; Sánchez (yellow card) 45+4'; Hollingshead (yellow card) 71'; Atuesta (yellow card) 87'	Stadium: Providence Park; Attendance: 23,245; Referee: Rubiel Vazquez

April 20 9	Columbus Crew	2–2	Portland Timbers	Columbus, Ohio
16:30 PDT	Hernández 51'; Moreira 74'; Zawadzki (yellow card) 80'	Report	Mora 10'; Moreno 57'; Rodríguez (yellow card) 59'	Stadium: Lower.com Field; Attendance: 20,740; Referee: Ted Unkel

April 27 10	Los Angeles FC	3–2	Portland Timbers	Los Angeles, California
19:30 PDT	K. Miller 44' (o.g.); Tillman 45+4'; Bogusz (yellow card) 48'; Sánchez (yellow card) 54'; Chanot (yellow card) 75'; Kamara (yellow card) 89'; Bouanga 90+2'	Report	Bravo (yellow card) 52'; Rodríguez (yellow card) 55', (goal) 65'; Williamson (yellow card) 68'; Chará (yellow card) 72' (yellow-red card) 76'; Moreno 73'; E. Miller (yellow card) 90+6'	Stadium: BMO Stadium; Attendance: 22,032; Referee: Ismail Elfath

May 4 11	Charlotte FC	2–0	Portland Timbers	Charlotte, North Carolina
16:30 PDT	Tavares (yellow card) 45+3'; Dejaegere (yellow card) 45+3'; Petković 54'; Privett (yellow card) 82'; Bronico (yellow card) 82'; Copetti 90+1'; Diani (yellow card) 90+5'	Report	Paredes (yellow card) 20'; Williamson (yellow card) 36'	Stadium: Bank of America Stadium; Attendance: 27,495; Referee: Malik Badawi

May 12 12 Cascadia Cup	Portland Timbers	1–2	Seattle Sounders FC	Portland, Oregon
13:30 PDT	Mora 15'; Župarić (yellow card) 66'	Report	C. Roldan 19'; Ruidíaz 50'; Nouhou (yellow card) 54'	Stadium: Providence Park; Attendance: 25,218; Referee: Allen Chapman

May 15 13	Portland Timbers	4–2	San Jose Earthquakes	Portland, Oregon
19:30 PDT	Evander 74'; Rodríguez 80', 90+10'; K. Miller (yellow card) 82'; Mora 90'	Report	Pellegrino 31'; López 34'; Wilson (red card) 71'; Yarbrough (yellow card) 89'	Stadium: Providence Park; Attendance: 19,113; Referee: Pierre-Luc Lauziere

May 18 14	Minnesota United FC	2–1	Portland Timbers	Saint Paul, Minnesota
17:30 PDT	Tapias (yellow card) 42' (yellow-red card) 90+1'; Lod 65'; Jeong 82' (yellow card) 90+8'; Trapp (yellow card) 90+13'	Report	Rodríguez 17' (yellow card) 42'; Evander (yellow card) 44'; Chará (yellow card) 67'; Araujo (yellow card) 67'; Asprilla (yellow card) 82'	Stadium: Allianz Field; Attendance: 19,735; Referee: Jair Marrufo

May 25 15	Portland Timbers	2–1	Sporting Kansas City	Portland, Oregon
19:30 PDT	Mora 51'; Evander 79'	Report	Rodríguez (yellow card) 41', (goal) 63'	Stadium: Providence Park; Attendance: 22,848; Referee: Drew Fischer

May 29 16	Austin FC	0–2	Portland Timbers	Austin, Texas
17:30 PDT	Zardes (yellow card) 47'; Jiménez (yellow card) 50'; Rubio (yellow card) 74'; Pereira (yellow card) 77'	Report	Evander 45+3'; Rodríguez 66'; Paredes (yellow card) 90+2'	Stadium: Q2 Stadium; Attendance: 20,738; Referee: Victor Rivas

June 1 17	Portland Timbers	2–2	Houston Dynamo FC	Portland, Oregon
19:30 PDT	Mora 37'; Župarić (yellow card) 67'; Evander (yellow card) 71'; Chará (yellow card) 73'; Fogaça 76'; Williamson (yellow card) 82'	Report	Kowalczyk 9'; Escobar (yellow card) 27'; Carrasquilla 50'; Bassi (yellow card) 52'; Herrera (yellow card) 53'; Micael (yellow card) 76'; Dorsey (yellow card) 90+5'; Raines (yellow card) 90+7'	Stadium: Providence Park; Attendance: 21,214; Referee: Guido Gonzales, Jr.

June 8 18	St. Louis City SC	0–0	Portland Timbers	St. Louis, Missouri
17:30 PDT	Markanich (yellow card) 45+2'; Nilsson (yellow card) 45+4'; Kijima (yellow card) 51'; Pompeu (yellow card) 67'; Durkin (yellow card) 81'; Totland (yellow card) 82'	Report	Župarić (yellow card) 53'; Mora (yellow card) 83'	Stadium: CityPark; Attendance: 22,500; Referee: Ismir Pekmic

June 19 19	San Jose Earthquakes	1–2	Portland Timbers	San Jose, California
19:30 PDT	Marie 50'	Report	Evander 22', (yellow card) 76'; Bravo (yellow card) 48'; Rodríguez 72'; Fogaça (yellow card) 87'; Moreno (yellow card) 89'; E. Miller (yellow card) 90+4'	Stadium: PayPal Park; Attendance: 12,122; Referee: Marcos DeOliveira II

June 22 20 Cascadia Cup	Portland Timbers	2–0	Vancouver Whitecaps FC	Portland, Oregon
19:30 PDT	Rodríguez 26'; Mora 43'; Ayala (yellow card) 55'	Report	Schöpf (yellow card) 34' (red card) 52'; Blackmon (yellow card) 39'; Berhalter (yellow card) 60'	Stadium: Providence Park; Attendance: 22,471; Referee: Ted Unkel

June 29 21	Portland Timbers	3–2	Minnesota United FC	Portland, Oregon
19:30 PDT	Evander 45+8' (pen.); Moreno 73'; Rodríguez 90+2'	Report	Hlongwane 29'; Jeong Sang-bin 38'	Stadium: Providence Park; Attendance: 22,227; Referee: Timothy Ford

July 4 22	FC Dallas	3–2	Portland Timbers	Frisco, Texas
17:30 PDT	Illarramendi (yellow card) 22'; Musa 49'; Tafari 61'; Paredes 87' (o.g.); Kamungo (yellow card) 90'; Twumasi (yellow card) 90+4'; Ibeagha (yellow card) 90+9'	Report	Antony 8'; Evander 63', (yellow card) 90+9'	Stadium: Toyota Stadium; Attendance: 19,096; Referee: Rosendo Mendoza

July 7 23	Portland Timbers	4–1	Nashville SC	Portland, Oregon
19:30 PDT	Mora 18'; Rodríguez 21', 24'; Williamson 29'	Report	Anunga (red card) 35'; Surridge 82'; Kallman (yellow card) 90+3'	Stadium: Providence Park; Referee: Jon Freemon

July 13 24	Portland Timbers	3–0	Real Salt Lake	Portland, Oregon
19:00 PDT	Mora 3', (yellow card) 23'; Chará (yellow card) 7'; Rodríguez (yellow card) 8'; Moreno 48'; Bravo (yellow card) 86'; Evander 90'	Report	Arango (yellow card) 23'; Gómez (yellow card) 23'; Ojeda (yellow card) 37'; Crooks (yellow card) 56'; Luna (yellow card) 63'	Stadium: Providence Park; Attendance: 23,014; Referee: Joe Dickerson

July 20 25	LA Galaxy	3–2	Portland Timbers	Carson, California
19:30 PDT	Pec 38'; Puig 48'; Paintsil 58'; Nelson (yellow card) 90'; Berry (yellow card) 90+6'	Report	Evander (yellow card) 14'; Chará (yellow card) 42'; Rodríguez 52', (yellow card) 90+9'; Župarić (yellow card) 62'; Moreno 73'; Miller (yellow card) 90+5'	Stadium: Dignity Health Sports Park; Attendance: 23,586; Referee: Sergii Boiko

August 24 26	Portland Timbers	4–4	St. Louis City SC	Portland, Oregon
19:30 PDT	Araujo (yellow card) 34'; Rodríguez 39', (yellow card) 73'; Mora 57', 64', (red card) 90+3'; Evander (yellow card) 65', (goal) 90+9'; Williamson (yellow card) 76'	Report	Becher 10'; Löwen 36' (pen.); Teuchert 45+2'; Thórisson (yellow card) 50', (goal) 58'; Hartel (yellow card) 60'; Horn (yellow card) 89'	Stadium: Providence Park; Attendance: 22,583; Referee: Ramy Touchan

August 31 27 Cascadia Cup	Portland Timbers	1–0	Seattle Sounders FC	Portland, Oregon
19:30 PDT	Mosquera 55'	Report		Stadium: Providence Park; Attendance: 25,218; Referee: Lukasz Szpala

September 14 28	Colorado Rapids	2–1	Portland Timbers	Commerce City, Colorado
18:30 PDT	Lewis 14'; Harris (yellow card) 65'; Navarro 71'; Yapi (red card) 90+8'	Report	Ayala 24'; Chará (yellow card) 78'	Stadium: Dick's Sporting Goods Park; Attendance: 16,038; Referee: Filip Dujic

September 18 29	Portland Timbers	4–2	LA Galaxy	Portland, Oregon
19:30 PDT	Župarić (yellow card) 13'; Rodríguez 18'; Evander 39', 51'; Crépeau (yellow card) 45'; Ayala (yellow card) 52'; Mora 80'	Report	Brugman (yellow card) 45+2'; Pec 45+3'; Paintsil 59'; Yoshida (yellow card) 82'	Stadium: Providence Park; Referee: Timothy Ford

September 21 30	Real Salt Lake	3–3	Portland Timbers	Sandy, Utah
18:30 PDT	Marczuk 10'; Luna 22'; Katranis (yellow card) 72'; Gonçalves 90'	Report	Williamson (yellow card) 48'; Miller (yellow card) 55'; Evander (yellow card) 57', (goal) 76'; Antony 62'; Rodríguez 90+2'	Stadium: America First Field; Attendance: 20,778; Referee: Tori Penso

September 28 31 Cascadia Cup	Vancouver Whitecaps FC	1–1	Portland Timbers	Vancouver, British Columbia
19:30 PDT	White 3'; Schöpf (yellow card) 39'	Report	Miller (yellow card) 10'; Rodríguez 43'	Stadium: BC Place; Attendance: 25,902; Referee: Joe Dickerson

October 2 32	Portland Timbers	0–1	Austin FC	Portland, Oregon
19:30 PDT		Report	Pereira (yellow card) 22', (goal) 42'; Obrian (yellow card) 40'; Stuver (yellow card) 90+7'	Stadium: Providence Park; Referee: Alexis Da Silva

October 6 33	Portland Timbers	0–0	FC Dallas	Portland, Oregon
16:00 PDT	Miller (yellow card) 5'; Mosquera (yellow card) 84'	Report	Illarramendi (yellow card) 25'; Ntsabeleng (yellow card) 56'; Farfan (yellow card) 81'	Stadium: Providence Park; Referee: Armando Villarreal

October 19 34 Cascadia Cup	Seattle Sounders FC	1–1	Portland Timbers	Seattle, Washington
18:00 PDT	Nouhou (yellow card) 23'; Yeimar 37'; Rothrock (yellow card) 59'; Vargas (yellow card) 65' (yellow-red card) 69'; Rusnák (yellow card) 69'	Report	Antony 68'; Rodríguez (yellow card) 90+5'	Stadium: Lumen Field; Attendance: 36,341; Referee: Ismir Pekmic

=== MLS Cup playoffs ===
==== Wild Card round ====
October 23 Wild Card	Vancouver Whitecaps FC	5–0	Portland Timbers	Portland, Oregon
7:30 PM	Gauld 20', 31', 59'; White 24'; Armstrong 51'; Takaoka (yellow card) 54'; Raposo (yellow card) 85'	Report	D. Chará (yellow card) 23'; Evander (yellow card) 69'; K. Miller (yellow card) 85'	Stadium: Providence Park; Attendance: 19,143; Referee: Rubiel Vazquez
Note: Due to a scheduling conflict at BC Place the game was hosted at Providence Park with the Vancouver Whitecaps serving as the home team

=== U.S. Open Cup ===
The Timbers organization opted to send MLS Next Pro team Portland Timbers 2 to the 2024 U.S. Open Cup instead of playing with the main team.

=== Leagues Cup ===
==== Group Stage (West 5) ====
Pos	Team	Pld	W	PW	PL	L	GF	GA	GD	Pts	Qualification	POR	COL	LEO
1	(United States Soccer Federation) Portland Timbers	2	2	0	0	0	6	1	+5	6	Advance to knockout stage	—	3–0	—
2	(United States Soccer Federation) Colorado Rapids	2	0	1	0	1	1	5	−4	2	Advance to knockout stage	—	—	—
3	(Mexican Football Federation) León	2	0	0	1	1	2	3	−1	1		1–2	1–1	—

Source: Leagues Cup
Rules for classification: Tiebreakers

July 28 Group stage	León (Mexico)	1–2	(United States) Portland Timbers	Portland, Oregon
19:30 PDT	Medina 12', (yellow card) 33'	Report	Williamson (yellow card) 20'; McGraw 41', 90', (yellow card) 59'; Miller (yellow card) 45+2'	Stadium: Providence Park; Referee: Walter Lopez

August 1 Group stage	Portland Timbers (United States)	4–0	(United States) Colorado Rapids	Portland, Oregon
19:30 PDT	Antony 30'; Ayala 52'; Toye 69'; Moreno 71'; Crépeau (yellow card) 83'; Paredes (yellow card) 84'	Report	Maxsø (yellow card) 31'	Stadium: Providence Park; Attendance: 12,453; Referee: Steffon Dewar

==== Knockout stage ====
August 9 Round of 32	St. Louis City SC (United States)	3–1	(United States) Portland Timbers	St. Louis, Missouri
20:30 ET	Teuchert 51'; Hartel 83'; Becher 88'	Report	Bravo 54'	Stadium: CityPark; Attendance: 10,833; Referee: Pierre-Luc Lauzière (Canada)

==== Goals ====
As of October 20, 2024

Name	Nat	Games	Goals
Zac McGraw	(Canada)	2	2
Antony	(Brazil)	3	1
David Ayala	(Argentina)	3	1
Claudio Bravo	(Argentina)	3	1
Santiago Moreno	(Colombia)	3	1
Mason Toye	(United States)	3	1

== Transfers ==
Per league and club policy, terms of the deals are not disclosed except Targeted Allocation Money, General Allocation Money, draft picks, and international rosters spots.

=== Transfers In ===
Pos.	Player	Transferred from	Fee/notes	Date	Source
DF	(Canada) Kamal Miller	(United States) Inter Miami CF	Trade	January 4, 2024	
GK	(United States) Trey Muse	(United States) Charleston Battery	Transfer	January 5, 2024	
GK	(Canada) James Pantemis	(Canada) CF Montréal	Free	January 5, 2024	
GK	(Canada) Maxime Crépeau	(United States) Los Angeles FC	Free	January 17, 2024	
FW	(Uruguay) Jonathan Rodríguez	(Mexico) América	Transfer	March 20, 2024	

=== Transfers Out ===
Pos.	Player	Transferred to	Fee/notes	Date	Source
W	(Colombia) Yimmi Chará	(Colombia) Atlético Junior	Transfer	January 2, 2024	
FW	(Ivory Coast) Franck Boli	(Mexico) San Luis	Free	January 4, 2024	
MF	(Honduras) Bryan Acosta	(Turkey) Gaziantep FK	Free	January 15, 2024	
MF	(Argentina) Sebastián Blanco	(Argentina) San Lorenzo	Free	January 17, 2024	
FW	(United States) Diego Gutierrez	(United States) Charleston Battery	Free	January 17, 2024	
MF	(Germany) Noel Caliskan	(United States) Real Monarchs	Free	January 17, 2024	
GK	(United States) David Bingham	(United States) Charlotte FC	Free	January 30, 2024	
W, LB	(United States) Justin Rasmussen	(United States) Oakland Roots SC	Free	February 2, 2024	
GK	(United States) Hunter Sulte	(United States) Indy Eleven	Loan	February 23, 2024	
FW	(United States) Tega Ikoba	(United States) Indy Eleven	Loan	March 22, 2024	
GK	(Slovenia) Aljaž Ivačič	(United States) New England Revolution	Free	April 23, 2024	

== Team Statistics ==
=== MLS Regular Season ===
==== Goals ====
As of October 20, 2024

Name	Nat	Games	Goals
Jonathan Rodríguez	(Uruguay)	29	16
Evander	(Brazil)	28	15
Felipe Mora	(Chile)	29	14
Antony	(Brazil)	33	6
Santiago Moreno	(Colombia)	31	6
Eryk Williamson	(United States)	28	2
Dairon Asprilla	(Colombia)	19	1
David Ayala	(Argentina)	30	1
Nathan Fogaça	(Brazil)	16	1
Eric Miller	(United States)	25	1
Juan David Mosquera	(United States)	34	1

==== Assists ====
As of October 20, 2024

Name	Nat	Games	Assists
Evander	(Brazil)	28	19
Santiago Moreno	(Colombia)	31	14
Jonathan Rodríguez	(Uruguay)	29	7
Antony	(Brazil)	33	6
Felipe Mora	(Chile)	29	6
Juan David Mosquera	(United States)	34	5
Miguel Araujo	(Peru)	22	4
Dairon Asprilla	(Colombia)	19	3
Eryk Williamson	(United States)	28	3
Claudio Bravo	(Argentina)	22	2
Eric Miller	(United States)	25	2
Cristhian Paredes	(Paraguay)	31	1
David Ayala	(Argentina)	30	1
Diego Chará	(United States)	32	1
Kamal Miller	(Canada)	23	1
Dario Župarić	(Croatia)	28	1

==== Goalkeeping ====
As of October 20, 2024

Name	Nat	Games	Saves	Clean Sheets
Maxime Crépeau	(Canada)	20	58	2
James Pantemis	(Canada)	15	43	5
