= 2023 Portland Timbers season =

Portland Timbers
2023 season
- CEO: Heather Davis
- Interim Head coach: Miles Joseph
- Stadium: Providence Park; Portland, Oregon (Capacity: 25,218)
- Major League Soccer: Conference: 10th Overall: 18th
- U.S. Open Cup: Round of 32
- Leagues Cup: Round of 32
- Top goalscorer: League: Evander (9); All: Evander (11)
- Highest home attendance: 25,218
- Lowest home attendance: 21,320
- Average home league attendance: 23,102
- Biggest win: 4–1; SEA (April 15)
- Biggest defeat: 5–0; HOU (August 20)
Primary colors	Secondary colors

The 2023 Portland Timbers season was the 37th season in their existence and the 13th season for the Portland Timbers in Major League Soccer (MLS), the top-flight professional soccer league in the United States and Canada.

== Season review ==
=== February ===
On February 27, Portland hosted Sporting Kansas City for the home opener after a postponed match that was set for Saturday 25 due to heavy snow and ice. Portland scored the first goal in the 6th minute by Juan Mosquera (assisted by Yimmi Chará) to give the Timbers their first win of the season.

=== March ===
On March 4, Portland traveled to Los Angeles, California to play Los Angeles Football Club at the newly named BMO Stadium. Portland was able to almost catch up after being down by 3 with a final score of 2-3. The goalscorers were Evander (assist by: J. Mosquera) in the 62nd minute and C. Paredes (assist by: Nathan Fogaça) in the 84th minute.

On March 13, Portland announced the signing of Ivorian forward Franck Boli to a one-year contract with a club option for the 2024 season.

== Team kits ==
Supplier: Adidas / Sponsor: Alaska Air

Primary	Secondary

== Coaching staff and front office ==
=== Executive staff ===
Position	Staff
Owner of Peregrine Sports, LLC	Heather Davis
Chief Executive Officer	Heather Davis
Chief Administrative Officer / Chief Financial Officer	Sarah Keane
Chief Operations Officer	Ashley Highsmith
Chief Revenue Officer	Joe Cote
Sr. VP, Corporate Partnerships	Todd Spear
Sr. VP, Ticket and Business Intelligence	Chris Wilson
Sr. VP, Operations	Ken Puckett
VP, Production and Content	Matt Smith
VP, Communications	Collin Romer
VP, Community and Social Impact	Dr. Robin Beavers

Last updated: March 1, 2023

=== Coaching staff ===
Position	Staff
General Manager	Ned Grabavoy
Interim Head Coach	Miles Joseph
Assistant Coach	Liam Ridgewell
Goalkeeping Coach	Guillermo Valencia
Head Athletic Trainer	Stephanie Ludwig
Head of Performance	Nick Milonas
Director of Sports Medicine	Matthew Weston

Last updated: March 1, 2023
Source: Portland Timbers

=== Stadiums ===
Ground (capacity and dimensions)	Providence Park (25,218 / 110x75 yards)
Training ground	Adidas Training Facility

Source: Providence Park

== Squad information ==
=== First team ===
As of March 14, 2023

No.	Name	Nat	Positions	Since	Date of birth (age)	Signed from	Games	Goals
Goalkeepers
1	David Bingham	(United States)	GK	2022	October 19, 1989 (age 36)	Free agent	3	0
31	Aljaž Ivačič (INT)	(Slovenia)	GK	2019	December 29, 1993 (age 32)	(Slovenia) NK Olimpija Ljubljana	65	0
36	Hunter Sulte (HG)	(United States)	GK	2020	April 25, 2002 (age 23)	N/A	0	0
Defenders
5	Claudio Bravo (INT)	(Argentina)	DF	2020	March 13, 1997 (age 28)	(Argentina) Banfield	49	0
13	Dario Župarić	(Croatia)	DF	2020	May 3, 1992 (age 33)	(Croatia) HNK Rijeka	81	0
15	Eric Miller	(United States)	DF	2023	January 15, 1993 (age 33)	Free agent	0	0
16	Justin Rasmussen	(United States)	W, LB	2022	December 15, 1998 (age 27)	(United States) Portland Timbers 2	10	0
18	Zac McGraw	(United States)	DF	2020	June 8, 1997 (age 28)	2020 MLS SuperDraft	34	1
28	Pablo Bonilla	(Venezuela)	RB	2020	December 2, 1999 (age 26)	(Venezuela) Deportivo La Guaira	36	0
29	Juan Mosquera	(Colombia)	DF	2022	September 5, 2002 (age 23)	(Colombia) Independiente Medellín	4	1
33	Larrys Mabiala	(Democratic Republic of the Congo)	DF	2017	October 8, 1987 (age 38)	(Turkey) Kayserispor	130	8
Midfielders
10	Sebastián Blanco (DP)	(Argentina)	MF / FW	2017	March 5, 1990 (age 36)	(Argentina) San Lorenzo	159	40
18	Eryk Williamson (HG)	(United States)	MF	2018	June 11, 1997 (age 28)	(United States) D.C. United	65	4
20	Evander (DP) (INT)	(Brazil)	MF	2023	June 9, 1998 (age 27)	(Denmark) FC Midtjylland	1	0
21	Diego Chara	(Colombia)	CDM	2011	April 5, 1986 (age 39)	(Colombia) Deportes Tolima	339	12
22	Cristhian Paredes	(Paraguay)	CDM	2018	May 18, 1998 (age 27)	(Mexico) América	106	10
23	Yimmi Chará (DP)	(Colombia)	W	2020	April 2, 1991 (age 34)	(Brazil) Clube Atlético Mineiro	86	14
24	David Ayala (U22)	(Argentina)	MF	2022	July 26, 2002 (age 23)	(Argentina) Estudiantes	21	0
30	Santiago Moreno (U22) (INT)	(Colombia)	W	2021	April 21, 2000 (age 25)	(Colombia) América de Cali	48	7
44	Marvin Loría	(Costa Rica)	W	2018	April 24, 1997 (age 28)	(Costa Rica) Deportivo Saprissa	92	6
Forwards
7	Franck Boli (INT)	(Ivory Coast)	FW	2023	December 7, 1993 (age 32)	(Hungary) Ferencvárosi TC	0	0
9	Felipe Mora	(Chile)	ST	2020	August 2, 1994 (age 31)	(Mexico) UNAM	55	19
11	Jarosław Niezgoda (DP)	(Poland)	ST	2020	March 15, 1995 (age 30)	(Poland) Legia Warsaw	61	19
16	Diego Gutierrez	(United States)	FW	2023	May 1, 1999 (age 26)	2021 MLS SuperDraft	2	0
17	Tega Ikoba (HG)	(United States)	FW	2022	August 14, 2003 (age 22)	N/A	2	0
27	Dairon Asprilla	(Colombia)	RW / LW / FW	2015	May 25, 1992 (age 33)	(Colombia) Atlético Nacional	158	27

- (HG) = Homegrown Player
- (GA) = Generation Adidas Player
- (DP) = Designated Player
- (INT) = Player using International Roster Slot
- (U22) = Player using U22 Initiative Slot
- (L) = On Loan to the Timbers
- (LO) = Loaned out to another club
- (SEIL) = Season-ending Injury List

=== eMLS team ===
As of February 28, 2023

Name	Nat	Since	Gamer tag
Players
Bruno Albino	(Brazil)	2022	CptBruno

== Competitions ==
=== Competitions overview ===
Competition	Record								Start round	First match	Last match	Final position (conference)
Competition	G	W	D	L	GF	GA	GD	Win %				
Major League Soccer	34	11	13	10	46	58	−12	32.35	Matchday 1	February 27	October 21	18th (10th Western)
U.S. Open Cup	2	1	0	1	6	5	+1	50.00	Third round	April 26	May 10	Round of 32
Leagues Cup	3	1	0	2	3	3	+0	33.33	Group stage	July 22	August 4	Round of 32
Total	39	13	13	13	55	66	−11	33.33				

Source: Competitions

=== Major League Soccer ===
==== Preseason ====
Win Draw Loss Upcoming fixture

February 12, 2023 1	LA Galaxy	1–4	Portland Timbers	Indio, California
10:30 am PST		Report		Stadium: Empire Polo Club

February 15, 2023 2	Toronto FC	2–2	Portland Timbers	Indio, California
2:00 pm PST		Report		Stadium: Empire Polo Club

February 18, 2023 3	New York City FC	0–1	Portland Timbers	Indio, California
12:00 pm PST		Report		Stadium: Empire Polo Club

==== MLS Regular season ====
===== Western Conference =====
MLS Western Conference table (2023)
Pos	Team	Pld	W	L	T	GF	GA	GD	Pts	Qualification
8	Sporting Kansas City	34	12	14	8	48	51	−3	44	MLS Cup Wild Card
9	San Jose Earthquakes	34	10	10	14	39	43	−4	44	MLS Cup Wild Card
10	Portland Timbers	34	11	13	10	46	58	−12	43	
11	Minnesota United FC	34	10	13	11	46	51	−5	41	
12	Austin FC	34	10	15	9	49	55	−6	39	

Source: MLS
Rules for classification: 1) points; 2) total wins; 3) total goal differential; 4) total goals scored; 5) fewer disciplinary points; 6) away goal differential; 7) away goals scored; 8) home goals differential; 9) home goals scored; 10) coin toss (2 clubs tied) or drawing of lots (≥3 clubs tied)

===== Overall standings =====
Overall MLS standings table
Pos	Team	Pld	W	L	T	GF	GA	GD	Pts
16	San Jose Earthquakes	34	10	10	14	39	43	−4	44
17	New York Red Bulls	34	11	13	10	36	39	−3	43
18	Portland Timbers	34	11	13	10	46	58	−12	43
19	Charlotte FC	34	10	11	13	45	52	−7	43
20	CF Montréal	34	12	17	5	36	52	−16	41

Source: MLS
Rules for classification: 1) points; 2) total wins; 3) total goal differential; 4) total goals scored; 5) fewer disciplinary points; 6) away goal differential; 7) away goals scored; 8) home goals differential; 9) home goals scored; 10) coin toss (2 clubs tied) or drawing of lots (≥3 clubs tied)

===== Matches =====
Win Draw Loss Upcoming fixture

February 27, 2023 1	Portland Timbers	1–0	Sporting Kansas City	Portland, Oregon
7:00 pm PST	Mosquera 6' (Y. Chará); Zuparic (yellow card) 26'; Williamson (yellow card) 73'; Evander (yellow card) 89'	Report	Thommy (yellow card) 16'	Stadium: Providence Park; Attendance: 22,925; Referee: Timothy Ford
Note: Originally scheduled for February 25, but was postponed due to poor weather in Portland

March 4, 2023 2	Los Angeles FC	3–2	Portland Timbers	Los Angeles, California
1:30 pm PST	Chiellini 24'; Vela 34' (pen.); Sánchez (yellow card) 45+1'; Hollingshead (yellow card) 45+8'; Opoku 52' (Vela, D. Bouanga); Tillman (yellow card) 72'	Report	McGraw (yellow card) 41'; Evander 62' (Mosquera); Paredes 84' (Fogaça); Fogaça (yellow card) 90+1'	Stadium: BMO Stadium; Attendance: 22,202; Referee: Joseph Dickerson

March 11, 2023 3	Portland Timbers	1–2	St. Louis City SC	Portland, Oregon
7:30 pm PST	McGraw 3' (Williamson), (yellow card) 74'; Zuparic (yellow card) 54'; Moreno (yellow card) 68'	Report	Stroud (yellow card) 29', (goal) 45+1' (Klauss, Alm); Perez (yellow card) 65'; Hiebert 75' (Löwen)	Stadium: Providence Park; Attendance: 23,386; Referee: Victor Rivas

March 18, 2023 4	Atlanta United FC	5–1	Portland Timbers	Atlanta, Georgia
4:30 pm PST	Wiley 25' (Almada); Almada 45+5', 86' (Etienne, Gutman); Giakoumakis 59' (Wiley, Araújo); Araújo 75' (Almada); Sosa (yellow card) 81'	Report	Mabiala (yellow card) 45+3'; Bravo (yellow card) 61'; Williamson (yellow card) 67'; McGraw (yellow card) 68'; Ikoba 83' (Gutiérrez, Williamson)	Stadium: Mercedes-Benz Stadium; Attendance: 42,648; Referee: Ted Unkel

March 25, 2023 4	Portland Timbers	0–0	LA Galaxy	Portland, Oregon
1:30 pm PST	Fogaça (yellow card) 38'; Pablo Bonilla (yellow card) 55'; Bravo (yellow card) 66'	Report	Puig (yellow card) 45+4'; Calegari (yellow card) 48'; Boyd (yellow card) 60'; Rodríguez (yellow card) 69'; Neal (yellow card) 82'	Stadium: Providence Park; Attendance: 24,077; Referee: Chris Penso

April 1, 2023 6	FC Dallas	1–1	Portland Timbers	Frisco, Texas
5:30 pm PDT	Velasco (yellow card) 28'; Cerrillo (yellow card) 44'; Quignón 74'; Pomykal (yellow card) 81'; Tafari (yellow card) 90+5'	Report	Boli 90+2'	Stadium: Toyota Stadium; Attendance: 19,096; Referee: Armando Villarreal

April 8, 2023 7 Cascadia Cup	Vancouver Whitecaps FC	1–0	Portland Timbers	Vancouver, British Columbia
7:30 pm PDT	Blackmon (yellow card) 39'; White 74', (yellow card) 90'; Sartini (yellow card) 90+2'; Berhalter (yellow card) 90+3'	Report	Župarić (yellow card) 48'; Moreno (yellow card) 53'; Ayala (yellow card) 90'	Stadium: BC Place; Attendance: 17,029; Referee: Nima Saghafi

April 15, 2023 8 Cascadia Cup	Portland Timbers	4–1	Seattle Sounders FC	Portland, Oregon
7:30 pm PDT	Chará (yellow card) 58'; Asprilla 71'; Fogaça 76'; Niezgoda 81'; Mosquera 89'	Report	João Paulo (yellow card) 44'; A. Roldán (yellow card) 54'; Ruidíaz 58'	Stadium: Providence Park; Attendance: 25,218; Referee: Drew Fischer

April 22, 2023 9	FC Cincinnati	2–1	Portland Timbers	Cincinnati, Ohio
4:30 pm EDT	Nwobodo (yellow card) 32'; Santos 34'; Vazquez 58'; Mosquera (yellow card) 84'; Angulo (yellow card) 90+7'	Report	Mabiala (yellow card) 20'; Asprilla (yellow card) 30', (goal) 60'; Chara (yellow card) 72'; McGraw (yellow card) 90+1'	Stadium: TQL Stadium; Attendance: 25,513; Referee: Allen Chapman

April 29, 2023 10	St. Louis City SC	1–2	Portland Timbers	St Louis, Missouri
5:30 pm (PDT)	Hiebert (yellow card) 71'; Pompeu 81'	Report	McGraw (yellow card) 8'; Evander 63' (pen.); Chará 82'; Mosquera (yellow card) 90+2'	Stadium: CityPark; Attendance: 22,423; Referee: Ismail Elfath

May 6, 2023 11	Portland Timbers	2–2	Austin FC	Portland, Oregon
7:30 pm (PDT)	Župarić 33', (yellow card) 87'; Boli (yellow card) 40'; Bravo (yellow card) 56', (goal) 71'	Report	Gallagher 59'; Bruin 90+2'	Stadium: Providence Park; Attendance: 23,318; Referee: Jon Freemon

May 13, 2023 12 Cascadia Cup	Portland Timbers	3–1	Vancouver Whitecaps FC	Portland, Oregon
7:30 pm PDT	Boli 2'; Evander 18', 54'; McGraw (yellow card) 73'	Report	McGraw 24' (o.g.); Brown (yellow card) 74'	Stadium: Providence Park; Attendance: 23,154; Referee: Guido Gonzales Jr.

May 17, 2023 13	Real Salt Lake	0–0	Portland Timbers	Sandy, Utah
6:30 pm PDT	Eneli (yellow card) 45+1'	Report	Boli (yellow card) 72'	Stadium: America First Field; Attendance: 18,020; Referee: Ramy Touchan

May 20, 2023 14	Portland Timbers	0–1	Minnesota United FC	Portland, Oregon
7:30 pm PDT	McGraw (yellow card) 63'; Bravo (yellow card) 67'; Župarić (yellow card) 84'	Report	Boxall (yellow card) 82'; Hlongwane 90+5' (yellow card) 90+5'	Stadium: Providence Park; Attendance: 22,137; Referee: Armando Villarreal

May 28, 2023 15	Sporting Kansas City	4–1	Portland Timbers	Kansas City, Kansas
12:00 pm PDT	Thommy 11'; Fontàs (yellow card) 47'; Sallói 66'; Mabiala 68' (o.g.); Radoja (yellow card) 72'; Shelton (yellow card) 85'; Hernández 90+3'	Report	Boli 8'; Loría (yellow card) 89'	Stadium: Children's Mercy Park; Attendance: 18,514; Referee: Rubiel Vazquez

June 3, 2023 16 Cascadia Cup	Seattle Sounders FC	0–0	Portland Timbers	Seattle, Washington
1:30 pm PDT	Ragen (yellow card) 90+2'	Report	Chará (yellow card) 7'; Bravo (yellow card) 70'; Paredes (yellow card) 79'	Stadium: Lumen Field; Attendance: 42,054; Referee: Allen Chapman
Note: Part of a doubleheader with OL Reign and Portland Thorns FC.

June 11, 2023 17	Portland Timbers	1–0	FC Dallas	Portland, Oregon
7:00 pm PDT	Evander (yellow card) 16'; Boli 35'; Chará (yellow card) 71'; Paredes (yellow card) 90+6'; Loría (yellow card) 90+8'	Report	Obrian (yellow card) 45'; Cerrillo (yellow card) 46'; Jesus (yellow card) 71'	Stadium: Providence Park; Attendance: 22,907; Referee: Ted Unkel

June 17, 2023 18	San Jose Earthquakes	0–0	Portland Timbers	San Jose, California
7:30 pm PDT	Cowell (yellow card) 51'; Marie (yellow card) 54'; Thompson (yellow card) 90+1'	Report	Moreno (yellow card) 18'; Zuparic (yellow card) 44'; Miller (yellow card) 64'	Stadium: PayPal Park; Attendance: 14,188; Referee: Alex Chilowicz

June 21, 2023 19	Portland Timbers	1–2	Chicago Fire	Portland, Oregon
7:30 pm PDT	Boli 26'; Asprilla (yellow card) 56'; Bravo (yellow card) 75'	Report	Herbers 8'; Kamara 83'	Stadium: Providence Park; Attendance: 22,548; Referee: Fotis Bazakos

June 24, 2023 20	Portland Timbers	1–1	New York City FC	Portland, Oregon
7:30 pm PDT	Evander 38', (yellow card) 90+3'; Mabiala (yellow card) 50'; Bravo (yellow card) 70'	Report	Parks 51'; Turnbull (yellow card) 90'	Stadium: Providence Park; Attendance: 22,676; Referee: Nima Saghafi

July 1, 2023 21	Minnesota United FC	4–1	Portland Timbers	Saint Paul, Minnesota
5:30 pm PDT	Tapias (yellow card) 13'; Boxall (yellow card) 16'; Dotson (yellow card) 21'; Taylor (yellow card) 34'; Chará 43' (o.g.); Reynoso 45+4, 77' (yellow card) 73'; Hlongwane 74'	Report	Boli 60'; Paredes (yellow card) 90+1'	Stadium: Allianz Field; Attendance: 19,844; Referee: Lukasz Szpala

July 12, 2023 22	Colorado Rapids	0–0	Portland Timbers	Commerce City, Colorado
5:30 pm PDT	Abubakar (yellow card) 65'	Report	Chará (yellow card) 69'; Griffith (yellow card) 76'; Boli (yellow card) 78'	Stadium: Dick's Sporting Goods Park; Attendance: 17,426; Referee: Pierre-Luc Lauziere
Note: Match was abandoned on July 4 at halftime due to severe weather in the area and resumed on July 12.

July 15, 2023 23	Portland Timbers	3–2	Columbus Crew	Portland, Oregon
7:30 pm PDT	Asprilla 28', 30'; Loría (yellow card) 48'; Chará (yellow card) 54'; Blanco 80', (yellow card) 81'	Report	Zelarayán 45+3', 65'; Russell-Rowe (yellow card) 72'	Stadium: Providence Park; Attendance: 24,181; Referee: Timothy Ford

August 20, 2023 24	Houston Dynamo FC	5–0	Portland Timbers	Houston, Texas
5:30 pm PDT	Bassi 5' (pen.); Quiñónes 11'; Baird 14'; Escobar (yellow card) 22', (goal) 45+3'; Dorsey (yellow card) 45+4'; Smith 63'	Report	Zuparic (yellow card) 45+1'; Evander (yellow card) 89'; Araujo (yellow card) 90'	Stadium: Shell Energy Stadium; Attendance: 12,670; Referee: Marcos de Oliveira

August 26, 2023 25 Cascadia Cup	Portland Timbers	2–3	Vancouver Whitecaps FC	Portland, Oregon
7:30 pm PDT	Evander (yellow card) 34', (goal) 85'; Zuparic (yellow card) 51'; Mora 53'; Asprilla (yellow card) 63'; Boli (yellow card) 90+5'	Report	Gauld 13', 60' (pen.); White 36'; Cubas (yellow card) 65'; Laryea (yellow card) 90+5'	Stadium: Providence Park; Attendance: 22,674; Referee: Rosendo Mendoza

August 30, 2023 26	Portland Timbers	2–1	Real Salt Lake	Portland, Oregon
7:30 pm PDT	Moreno 13'; Chará (yellow card) 34'; Mora 64'; Asprilla (yellow card) 90+3'; Bingham (yellow card) 90+5'	Report	Ojeda (yellow card) 45+1'; Arango 83'; Vera (yellow card) 86'	Stadium: Providence Park; Attendance: 21,320; Referee: Joseph Dickerson

September 2, 2023 27 Cascadia Cup	Seattle Sounders FC	2–2	Portland Timbers	Seattle, Washington
7:30 pm PDT	Ruidíaz 9'; Léo Chú 30', (yellow card) 31' (yellow-red card) 53'; João Paulo (yellow card) 76'	Report	Asprilla 67', (yellow card) 68'; Evander 70'; Blanco (yellow card) 82'; Župarić (yellow card) 90+4'	Stadium: Lumen Field; Attendance: 37,031; Referee: Jon Freemon

September 9, 2023 28	Portland Timbers	2–0	Los Angeles FC	Portland, Oregon
7:30 pm PDT	Mabiala 28'; Bravo 53'; Paredes (yellow card) 82'	Report	Acosta (yellow card) 57'	Stadium: Providence Park; Attendance: 23,239; Referee: Drew Fischer

September 17, 2023 29	Austin FC	1–2	Portland Timbers	Austin, Texas
5:30 pm PDT	Wolff (yellow card) 57'; Cascante (yellow card) 61'; Driussi 75'	Report	Mora 39'; Evander 64'; Antony (yellow card) 90+7'	Stadium: Q2 Stadium; Attendance: 20,738; Referee: Armando Villarreal

September 20, 2023 30	Portland Timbers	2–1	San Jose Earthquakes	Portland, Oregon
7:30 pm PDT	Paredes (yellow card) 41', (goal) 45+3'; Evander 58'; Bingham (yellow card) 90+9'	Report	Marie (yellow card) 32'; Gruezo (yellow card) 35'; Hoppe 60'; Espinoza (yellow card) 90+2'	Stadium: Providence Park; Attendance: 21,518; Referee: Ramy Touchan

September 23, 2023 31	Portland Timbers	3–2	Colorado Rapids	Portland, Oregon
7:30 pm PDT	Antony 19'; Caliskan (yellow card) 24'; Moreno 30'; Mora (yellow card) 40', (goal) 71'; Bravo (yellow card) 48'; Župarić (yellow card) 64'; Boli (yellow card) 90+6'	Report	Rubio 31', (yellow card) 70'; Gutman 43'; Leyva (yellow card) 45+3'; Díaz (yellow card) 90'	Stadium: Providence Park; Attendance: 22,248; Referee: Guido Gonzales Jr.

September 30, 2023 32	LA Galaxy	3–3	Portland Timbers	Carson, California
7:30 pm PDT	Zavaleta 10', 45+1'; Delgado (yellow card) 13'; Costa 43'; Yoshida (yellow card) 54'	Report	Moreno 5', (yellow card) 62'; Zavaleta 38' (o.g.); Mora 76'	Stadium: Dignity Health Sports Park; Attendance: 23,101; Referee: Joseph Dickerson

October 7, 2023 33	CF Montréal	4–1	Portland Timbers	Montreal, Quebec
4:30 pm PDT	Ibrahim 28'; Opoku 30'; Choinière 64'; Toye 76'	Report	Acosta (yellow card) 53'; Boli 86'	Stadium: Saputo Stadium; Attendance: 17,559; Referee: Lukasz Szpala

October 21, 2023 34	Portland Timbers	1–3	Houston Dynamo FC	Portland, Oregon
6:00 pm PDT	Chará (yellow card) 66'; McGraw (yellow card) 74'; Mora 80'	Report	Dorsey 11', 71'; Micael (yellow card) 41'; Escobar (yellow card) 42'; Carrasquilla (yellow card) 45+4', (goal) 48'; Herrera (yellow card) 67'	Stadium: Providence Park; Attendance: 25,218; Referee: Rubiel Vazquez

===== Results by match round =====
Matchday	1	2	3	4	5	6
Stadium	H	A	H	A	H	A
Result	W	L	L	L	D	D

Updated to match(es) played on March 4, 2023. Source: Major League Soccer
A = Away; H = Home; W = Win; D = Draw; L = Loss

===== Results by location =====
Overall								Home						Away					
Pld	W	D	L	GF	GA	GD	Pts	W	D	L	GF	GA	GD	W	D	L	GF	GA	GD
6	1	2	3	5	10	−5	5	1	1	1	2	2	0	0	1	2	3	8	−5

Last updated: April 6, 2023.
Source: Major League Soccer

==== Cascadia Cup ====
===== Standings =====
Pos	Team	GP	W	L	D	GF	GA	GD	Pts
1	Vancouver Whitecaps FC	6	3	1	2	9	8	1	10
2	Portland Timbers	6	2	2	2	11	8	+3	8
3	Seattle Sounders FC	6	1	3	2	6	10	-4	6

Last updated: October 20, 2024.
Source: Cascadia Cup

===== Matches =====
April 8, 2023 7 Cascadia Cup	Vancouver Whitecaps FC	1–0	Portland Timbers	Vancouver, British Columbia
7:30pm PDT	Blackmon (yellow card) 39'; White 74', (yellow card) 90'; Sartini (yellow card) 90+2'; Berhalter (yellow card) 90+3'	Report	Župarić (yellow card) 48'; Moreno (yellow card) 53'; Ayala (yellow card) 90'	Stadium: BC Place; Attendance: 17,029; Referee: Nima Saghafi

April 15, 2023 8 Cascadia Cup	Portland Timbers	4–1	Seattle Sounders FC	Portland, Oregon
7:30pm PDT	Chará (yellow card) 58'; Asprilla 71'; Fogaça 76'; Niezgoda 81'; Mosquera 89'	Report	João Paulo (yellow card) 44'; A. Roldán (yellow card) 54'; Ruidíaz 58'	Stadium: Providence Park; Attendance: 25,218; Referee: Drew Fischer

May 13, 2023 12 Cascadia Cup	Portland Timbers	3–1	Vancouver Whitecaps FC	Portland, Oregon
7:30pm PDT	Boli 2'; Evander 18', 54'; McGraw (yellow card) 73'	Report	McGraw 24' (o.g.); Brown (yellow card) 74'	Stadium: Providence Park; Attendance: 23,154; Referee: Guido Gonzales Jr.

June 3, 2023 16 Cascadia Cup	Seattle Sounders FC	0–0	Portland Timbers	Seattle, Washington
1:30 p.m. PDT	Ragen (yellow card) 90+2'	Report	Chará (yellow card) 7'; Bravo (yellow card) 70'; Paredes (yellow card) 79'	Stadium: Lumen Field; Attendance: 42,054; Referee: Allen Chapman
Note: Part of a doubleheader with OL Reign and Portland Thorns FC.

August 26, 2023 25 Cascadia Cup	Portland Timbers	2–3	Vancouver Whitecaps FC	Portland, Oregon
7:30 pm PDT	Evander (yellow card) 34', (goal) 85'; Zuparic (yellow card) 51'; Mora 53'; Asprilla (yellow card) 63'; Boli (yellow card) 90+5'	Report	Gauld 13', 60' (pen.); White 36'; Cubas (yellow card) 65'; Laryea (yellow card) 90+5'	Stadium: Providence Park; Attendance: 22,674; Referee: Rosendo Mendoza

September 2, 2023 27 Cascadia Cup	Seattle Sounders FC	2–2	Portland Timbers	Seattle, Washington
7:30 pm PDT	Ruidíaz 9'; Léo Chú 30', (yellow card) 31' (yellow-red card) 53'; João Paulo (yellow card) 76'	Report	Asprilla 67', (yellow card) 68'; Evander 70'; Blanco (yellow card) 82'; Župarić (yellow card) 90+4'	Stadium: Lumen Field; Attendance: 37,031; Referee: Jon Freemon

=== U.S. Open Cup ===
Win Draw Loss Upcoming fixture

April 26, 2023 3rd round	Portland Timbers (MLS) (Oregon)	3–1	(California) Orange County SC (USLC)	Portland, Oregon
7:30 PM PDT	Blanco (yellow card) 30'; Loría 37'; Clegg 48'; Sulte (yellow card) 90+1'; Niezgoda 90+2'	Report	Iloski 54', (yellow card) 57'	Stadium: Providence Park; Attendance: 11,639; Referee: Olvin Oliva

May 10, 2023 round of 32	Portland Timbers (MLS) (Oregon)	3–4	(Utah) Real Salt Lake (MLS)	Portland, Oregon
7:30 PM PDT	Blanco 4'; Rasmussen 50'; Niezgoda 52'; Griffith (yellow card) 62'; Loría (yellow card) 72'; Bonilla (yellow card) 88'; Asprilla (yellow card) 90+3'	Report	Musovski 30'; Gómez 41', (yellow card) 51'; Chang 55', 59'; Pierre (yellow card) 70'; Ojeda (yellow card) 90+6'	Stadium: Providence Park; Attendance: 8,071; Referee: Victor Rivas

=== Leagues Cup ===
==== West 1 Group ====
===== Standings =====
Pos	Team	Pld	W	PW	PL	L	GF	GA	GD	Pts	Qualification	UAN	POR	SJE
1	(Mexico) UANL	2	2	0	0	0	3	1	+2	6	Advance to knockout stage	—	2–1	1–0
2	(United States) Portland Timbers	2	1	0	0	1	3	2	+1	3	Advance to knockout stage	—	—	2–0
3	(United States) San Jose Earthquakes	2	0	0	0	2	0	3	−3	0		—	—	—

Source: Leagues Cup
Rules for classification: Tiebreakers

===== Matches =====
Win Draw Loss Upcoming fixture

July 22, 2023 Group stage	Portland Timbers (United States)	2–0	(United States) San Jose Earthquakes	Portland, Oregon
7:00 PM PT	Evander 33'; Paredes (yellow card) 45+2'; Mora 86'	Report	Gruezo (yellow card) 35'	Stadium: Providence Park; Attendance: 21,137; Referee: Víctor Alfonso Cáceres Hernández

July 26, 2023 Group stage	Portland Timbers (United States)	1–2	(Mexico) UANL	Portland, Oregon
7:00 PM PT	Evander 24', (yellow card) 39' (yellow-red card) 44'	Report	Carioca (yellow card) 30'; Samir (yellow card) 37'; Gignac 42'; Quiñones (yellow card) 45+4'; Vigón (yellow card) 61'; Angulo 80'	Stadium: Providence Park; Attendance: 21,755; Referee: Walter López Castellanos

August 4, 2023 R32	Portland Timbers (United States)	0–1	(Mexico) Monterrey	Portland, Oregon
7:00 PM PT	Mosquera (yellow card) 28'; Zuparic (yellow card) 80'; Chará (yellow card) 90+6'	Report	Gallardo (yellow card) 27'; Rojas (yellow card) 39'; Meza 45+1', (yellow card) 79'; Romo (yellow card) 90+6'	Stadium: Providence Park; Attendance: 18,770; Referee: Guillermo Pacheco Larios

== Transfers ==
Per league and club policy, terms of the deals are not disclosed except Targeted Allocation Money, General Allocation Money, draft picks, and international rosters spots.

=== Transfers in ===
Date	Position	Player	Previous club	TAM	GAM	Notes	Source
Winter
December 5, 2022	MF	(Brazil) Evander	(Denmark) FC Midtjylland	N/A	N/A	Signed as a Designated Player.	
February 25, 2023	DF	(United States) Eric Miller	(United States) Nashville SC	N/A	N/A	Signed as a free agent.	
March 13, 2023	FW	(Ivory Coast) Franck Boli	(Hungary) Ferencvárosi TC	N/A	N/A	Occupy an International Roster Spot.	
Summer

=== Loans in ===
Date	Position	Player	Previous club	TAM	GAM	Notes	Source
Winter
Summer

=== Loans out ===
Date	Position	Player	Loaned club	TAM	GAM	Notes	Source
Winter
Summer
