= 2022 Nashville SC season =

Nashville SC
2022 season
- Head coach: Gary Smith
- Stadium: Geodis Park
- MLS: Conference: 5th
- MLS Cup Playoffs: First round
- U.S. Open Cup: Quarter-finals
- Top goalscorer: League: Hany Mukhtar (23); All: Hany Mukhtar (26)
- Highest home attendance: 30,109 (5/1 v. PHI) (5/21 v. ATL)
- Lowest home attendance: 26,003 (5/18 v. MTL)
- Average home league attendance: 28,731
- Biggest win: NSH 4–0 DAL (8/27)
- Biggest defeat: CLT 4-1 NSH (7/9)
Home colors	Away colors

The 2022 Nashville SC season was the club's third season as a member of Major League Soccer. The club returned to the Western Conference following the addition of Charlotte FC to the Eastern Conference.

== Roster ==
=== Current roster ===
As of May 13, 2022

Squad no.	Name	Nationality	Position(s)	Date of birth (age)	Previous club	Apps	Goals
Goalkeepers
1	Joe Willis	(United States)	GK	August 10, 1988 (age 38)	(United States) Houston Dynamo FC	69	0
32	Will Meyer	(United States)	GK	May 24, 1998 (age 28)	(United States) Akron	0	0
35	Bryan Meredith	(United States)	GK	August 2, 1989 (age 37)	(United States) Vancouver Whitecaps FC	0	0
Defenders
2	Daniel Lovitz	(United States)	DF	August 27, 1991 (age 35)	(Canada) CF Montréal	61	1
4	Dave Romney	(United States)	DF	June 12, 1993 (age 33)	(United States) LA Galaxy	69	3
5	Jack Maher (GA)	(United States)	DF	October 28, 1999 (age 27)	(United States) Indiana University	33	1
15	Eric Miller	(United States)	DF	January 15, 1993 (age 33)	(United States) New York City FC	27	0
21	Ahmed Longmire	(United States)	DF	October 11, 1999 (age 27)	(United States) UCLA	0	0
22	Josh Bauer	(United States)	DF	July 22, 1998 (age 28)	(United States) Atlanta United FC	0	0
23	Taylor Washington	(United States)	DF	August 16, 1993 (age 33)	(United States) Nashville SC (USL)	37	0
24	Robert Castellanos	(United States)	DF	May 11, 1998 (age 28)	(United States) Rio Grande Valley FC	1	1
25	Walker Zimmerman (DP)	(United States)	DF	May 19, 1993 (age 33)	(United States) Los Angeles FC	62	7
Midfielders
6	Dax McCarty (C)	(United States)	MF	April 30, 1987 (age 39)	(United States) Chicago Fire FC	61	2
7	Handwalla Bwana (HG)	(Kenya)	FW	June 25, 1999 (age 27)	(United States) Seattle Sounders FC	8	0
8	Randall Leal (INTL)	(Costa Rica)	MF	January 14, 1997 (age 29)	(Costa Rica) Deportivo Saprissa	67	13
10	Hany Mukhtar (DP)	(Germany)	MF	March 21, 1995 (age 31)	(Denmark) Brøndby IF	61	26
13	Irakoze Donasiyano	(Burundi)	MF	February 3, 1998 (age 28)	(United States) Virginia	1	0
19	Alex Muyl (HG)	(United States)	MF	September 30, 1995 (age 31)	(United States) New York Red Bulls	65	4
20	Aníbal Godoy	(Panama)	MF	February 10, 1990 (age 36)	(United States) San Jose Earthquakes	57	2
26	Luke Haakenson	(United States)	MF	September 10, 1997 (age 29)	(United States) Creighton University	24	2
27	Tah Brian Anunga	(Cameroon)	MF	August 10, 1996 (age 30)	(United States) Charleston Battery	51	1
54	Sean Davis (HG)	(United States)	MF	February 8, 1993 (age 33)	(United States) New York Red Bulls	10	0
Forwards
9	Aké Loba (DP, INTL)	(Ivory Coast)	FW	April 1, 1998 (age 28)	(Mexico) C.F. Monterrey	29	1
11	Ethan Zubak (HG)	(United States)	FW	April 15, 1998 (age 28)	(United States) LA Galaxy	2	0
12	Teal Bunbury	(United States)	FW	February 27, 1990 (age 36)	(United States) New England Revolution	4	0
17	C. J. Sapong	(United States)	FW	December 27, 1988 (age 37)	(United States) Chicago Fire FC	45	15

== Competitions ==
=== Major League Soccer ===
==== Standings ====
Pos	Team	Pld	W	L	T	GF	GA	GD	Pts	Qualification
3	FC Dallas	34	14	9	11	48	37	+11	53	Qualification for the first round
4	LA Galaxy	34	14	12	8	58	51	+7	50	Qualification for the first round
5	Nashville SC	34	13	10	11	52	41	+11	50	Qualification for the first round
6	Minnesota United FC	34	14	14	6	48	51	−3	48	Qualification for the first round
7	Real Salt Lake	34	12	11	11	43	45	−2	47	Qualification for the first round

Source: MLS
Rules for classification: 1) points; 2) total wins; 3) total goal differential; 4) total goals scored; 5) fewer disciplinary points; 6) away goal differential; 7) away goals scored; 8) home goals differential; 9) home goals scored; 10) coin toss (2 clubs tied) or drawing of lots (≥3 clubs tied)

==== Match results ====
February 27 1	Seattle Sounders FC	0–1	Nashville SC	Seattle, Washington
7:00 PM CST	Arreaga (yellow card) 18'; Nouhou (yellow card) 90+5'	Report	Godoy 80'	Stadium: Lumen Field; Attendance: 30,013; Referee: Alex Chilowicz

March 5 2	Minnesota United FC	1–1	Nashville SC	St. Paul, Minnesota
5:00 PM CST	Dotson (yellow card) 20' (goal) 71'; Dibassy (yellow card) 31'	Report	Sapong 5'; Davis (yellow card) 26'; Godoy (yellow card) 58'	Stadium: Allianz Field; Attendance: 18,107; Referee: Armando Villarreal

March 12 3	FC Dallas	2–0	Nashville SC	Frisco, Texas
7:30 PM CDT	Pomykal (yellow card) 25'; Martínez (yellow card) 33'; Jara 85' (pen.); Velasco 87'; Cerrillo (yellow card) 90+6'	Report	Sapong (yellow card) 28'; Leal (yellow card) 40'; Muyl (yellow card) 62'; Godoy (yellow card) 82'	Stadium: Toyota Stadium; Attendance: 13,448; Referee: Ramy Touchan

March 19 4	Real Salt Lake	2–1	Nashville SC	Sandy, Utah
8:30 PM CDT	Wood 2'; Schmitt (yellow card) 24', (goal) 54'	Report	Zimmerman 25', (yellow card) 53'; Lovitz (yellow card) 41'; McCarty (yellow card) 90+3', (red card) 90+6'	Stadium: Rio Tinto Stadium; Attendance: 20,036; Referee: Tori Penso

April 2 5	Columbus Crew	0–1	Nashville SC	Columbus, Ohio
5:00 CDT	Etienne (yellow card) 55'; Díaz (yellow card) 66'; Artur (yellow card) 90+3'	Report	Muyl 28', (yellow card) 79'; Sapong (yellow card) 75'; Haakenson (yellow card) 90+5'	Stadium: Lower.com Field; Attendance: 20,371; Referee: Rubiel Vazquez

April 9 6	Sporting Kansas City	1–2	Nashville SC	Kansas City, Kansas
7:30 PM CDT	Duke (yellow card) 17'; Walter 25'; Espinoza (yellow card) 52'; Hernández (yellow card) 63'	Report	Romney 51'; Sapong 68'; Washington (yellow card) 79'	Stadium: Children's Mercy Park; Attendance: 18,852; Referee: Ismail Elfath

April 16 7	San Jose Earthquakes	2–2	Nashville SC	San Jose, California
12:30 PM CDT	Cowell (yellow card) 21'; Ebobisse 52', 72'	Report	Mukhtar 38', 63'; Lovitz (yellow card) 51'; Haakenson (yellow card) 90+5'	Stadium: PayPal Park; Attendance: 10,394; Referee: Timothy Ford

April 23 8	LA Galaxy	1–0	Nashville SC	Carson, California
9:30PM CDT	Joveljić 86', (yellow card) 87'; Hernández (yellow card) 89'	Report		Stadium: Dignity Health Sports Park; Attendance: 26,674; Referee: Allen Chapman

May 1 9	Nashville SC	1–1	Philadelphia Union	Nashville, Tennessee
4:00 PM EDT	Lovitz (yellow card) 33'; Muyl (yellow card) 37'; Davis (yellow card) 49'; Leal (yellow card) 76', (goal) 85' (pen.)	Report	Wagner (yellow card) 60'; Martínez (yellow card) 62'; Uhre 66'; Blake (yellow card) 84'	Stadium: Geodis Park; Attendance: 30,109; Referee: Chris Penso

May 8 10	Nashville SC	2–0	Real Salt Lake	Nashville, Tennessee
3:00 PM MT	Romney 63'; Sapong 90+'	Report	Luiz (yellow card) 20'; Ruiz (yellow card) 49'	Stadium: Geodis Park; Attendance: 28,226; Referee: Fotis Bazakos

May 14 11	Houston Dynamo	2–0	Nashville SC	Houston, Texas
7:30 PM CDT	Carrasquilla 16'; Lundqvist (red card) 35'; Clark (yellow card) 42'; Hadebe (yellow card) 42'; Quintero (yellow card) 49' (goal) 53' (pen.)	Report	Miller (yellow card) 45+1'; Maher (yellow card) 46'; Zubak (yellow card) 86'; Zimmerman (yellow card) 90+1'	Stadium: PNC Stadium; Attendance: 16,035; Referee: Ramy Touchan

May 18 12	Nashville SC	2–1	CF Montréal	Nashville SC
8:30 PM EDT	Muyl 28', (yellow card) 43'; Mukhtar (yellow card) 41', (goal) 51'	Report	Kamara 55'	Stadium: Geodis Park; Attendance: 26,003; Referee: Jon Freemon

May 21 13	Nashville SC	2–2	Atlanta United FC	Nashville, Tennessee
7:00 PM CDT	Sapong 24' (yellow card) 72'; Mukhtar 31'; Godoy (yellow card) 59'; Muyl (yellow card) 82'; Zubak (yellow card) 83'	Report	Almada 26'; Ibarra (yellow card) 33'; Dwyer 88'	Stadium: Geodis Park; Attendance: 30,109; Referee: Ted Unkel

May 28 14	Colorado Rapids	1–3	Nashville SC	Commerce City, Colorado
8:00 PM CDT	Rubio (yellow card) 14', (goal) 78'; Abubakar (yellow card) 41'; Acosta (yellow card) 51'	Report	Sapong 8'; Mukhtar 14', 17', (yellow card) 56'; Miller (yellow card) 42'	Stadium: Dick's Sporting Goods Park; Attendance: 15,465; Referee: Nima Saghafi

June 11 15	Nashville SC	0–0	San Jose Earthquakes	Nashville, Tennessee
7:00 PM CDT	Anunga (yellow card) 74'	Report	Remedi (yellow card) 67'; Judson (yellow card) 83'; Marie (yellow card) 89'	Stadium: Geodis Park; Attendance: 28,672; Referee: Allen Chapman

June 19 16	Nashville SC	1–2	Sporting Kansas City	Nashville, Tennessee
3:00 PM CDT	Godoy (yellow card) 40'; Loba 63'	Report	Hernández 41'; Zusi 51'; Melia (yellow card) 81'; Russell (yellow card) 86'; Espinoza (yellow card) 89'	Stadium: Geodis Park; Attendance: 29,269; Referee: Victor Rivas

June 25 17	D.C. United	1–3	Nashville SC	Washington, DC
2:00 p.m. EDT	Najar (yellow card) 21'; Fountas 59'; Birnbaum (yellow card) 63'	Report	Lovitz 6' (yellow card) 26'; Mukhtar 45+1' 50'; Zimmerman (yellow card) 54'; Romney (yellow card) 60'; Anunga (yellow card) 84'; Haakenson (yellow card) 90+2'	Stadium: Audi Field; Attendance: 19,325; Referee: Lukasz Szpala

July 3 18	Nashville SC	2–2	Portland Timbers	Nashville, Tennessee
7:30 PM CDT	Davis 18'; Mukhtar 57'; Zimmerman (yellow card) 77'	Report	Ayala (yellow card) 28'; McGraw (yellow card) 51'; Asprilla 64' (pen.); Niezgoda 69'	Stadium: Geodis Park; Attendance: 28,387; Referee: Armando Villarreal

July 9 19	Charlotte FC	4–1	Nashville SC	Charlotte, North Carolina
6:30 PM CDT	Fuchs 26' (pen.); Świderski 61'; Ruiz 89'; Shinyashiki 90+1'	Report	Anunga (yellow card) 21'; Mukhtar 67' (pen.); Leal (yellow card) 71'; Washington (yellow card) 90+6'	Stadium: Bank of America Stadium; Referee: Joseph Dickerson

July 13 20	Nashville SC	1–0	Seattle Sounders FC	Nashville, Tennessee
7:30 PM CDT	Mukhtar 44'; Muyl (yellow card) 45+2'; Miller (yellow card) 89'	Report		Stadium: Geodis Park; Attendance: 26,927; Referee: Rubiel Vazquez

July 17 21	Nashville SC	1–2	Los Angeles FC	Nashville, Tennessee
7:30 PM CDT	Muyl (yellow card) 13'; Anunga (yellow card) 18'; Mukhtar 43' (pen.); Leal (yellow card) 89'	Report	Arango 27'; Cifuentes 46'; Escobar (yellow card) 73'; Blessing (yellow card) 83'	Stadium: Geodis Park; Attendance: 30,109; Referee: Drew Fischer

July 23 22	FC Cincinnati	1–1	Nashville SC	Cincinnati, Ohio
6:30 PM CDT	Vazquez 52'; Cameron (yellow card) 73'	Report	Bunbury 6'; Muyl (yellow card) 39'; Lovitz (yellow card) 61'	Stadium: TQL Stadium; Attendance: 23,420; Referee: Chris Penso

July 30 23	Nashville SC	1–1	Vancouver Whitecaps FC	Nashville, Tennessee
7:00 PM CDT	Bunbury 17'; Maher (yellow card) 86'	Report	Blackmon (yellow card) 33'; Baldisimo (yellow card) 47'; Raposo (yellow card) 56'; Brown 87'; Gauld (yellow card) 90+2'	Stadium: Geodis Park; Attendance: 26,578; Referee: Marcos de Oliveira

August 3 24	Portland Timbers	1–1	Nashville SC	Portland, Oregon
9:30 PM CDT	Moreno 27'; McGraw (yellow card) 90'	Report	Bunbury 20', (yellow card) 67'; Zimmerman (yellow card) 45+1'; Mukhtar (yellow card) 59'	Stadium: Providence Park; Attendance: 23,101; Referee: Silviu Petrescu

August 6 25	Nashville SC	3–4	Toronto FC	Nashville, Tennessee
8:00 PM EDT	McCarty (yellow card) 2'; Davis (yellow card) 24'; Mukhtar 41' (pen.); Bunbury 45+4'; Sapong (yellow card) 61'; Zimmerman 84'	Report	Osorio 19', 44'; Laryea (yellow card) 40'; Bernardeschi 54' (pen.); Marshall-Rutty (yellow card) 71'; Insigne 77'	Stadium: Geodis Park; Attendance: 26,326; Referee: Allen Chapman

August 14 26	Nashville SC	1–2	Minnesota United FC	Nashville, Tennessee
8:00 PM CT	Mukhtar 61'; Leal (yellow card) 90+4'	Report	Fragapane 27' (yellow card) 45+1'; Reynoso (yellow card) 31'; Lod (yellow card) 46'; Benítez 75'	Stadium: Geodis Park; Attendance: 25,240; Referee: Alex Chilowicz

August 21 27	Nashville SC	4–0	FC Dallas	Nashville, Tennessee
8:30 PM EDT	Mukhtar 5', 33'; Shaffelburg 26'; Romney 72'	Report	Pomykal (yellow card) 31'; Lletget (yellow card) 62'; Twumasi (yellow card) 67'	Stadium: Geodis Park; Attendance: 25,571; Referee: Kevin Stott

August 27 28	Vancouver Whitecaps FC	0–3	Nashville SC	Vancouver, British Columbia
10:00 PM EDT	Brown (yellow card) 36'; Blackmon (yellow card) 44'; Cavallini (red card) 53'	Report	Leal 19'; Maher 23', 50'; Washington (yellow card) 63'; Davis (yellow card) 76'; Lovitz (yellow card) 90'	Stadium: BC Place; Attendance: 16,361; Referee: Jon Freemon

August 31 29	Nashville SC	4–1	Colorado Rapids	Nashville, Tennessee
8:30 PM EDT	Mukhtar 29' (pen.), 54', 75'; Godoy (yellow card) 45'; Leal (yellow card) 59'; Shaffelburg 61'; McCarty (yellow card) 70'	Report	Zardes 35'; Abubakar (yellow card) 41'; Acosta (yellow card) 71'	Stadium: Geodis Park; Attendance: 24,127; Referee: Mark Allatin

September 3 30	Nashville SC	3–0	Austin FC	Nashville, Tennessee
8:30 PM EDT	Zimmerman 49'; Mukhtar 29', 90+1', (yellow card) 83'	Report	Fagúndez (yellow card) 39'; Cascante (yellow card) 54'; Lima (yellow card) 75'; Djitté (yellow card) 90+4' (yellow-red card) 90+5'	Stadium: Geodis Park; Attendance: 25,293; Referee: Nima Saghafi

September 10 31	Nashville SC	1–1	LA Galaxy	Nashville, Tennessee
3:30 PM EDT	Mukhtar 29' (pen.); Zimmerman (yellow card) 31' (yellow-red card) 90+7'; Romney (yellow card) 42'; Leal (yellow card) 45+2'; Moore (yellow card) 84'; Willis (yellow card) 90+9'	Report	Coulibaly (yellow card) 22'; Williams (yellow card) 27'; Puig (yellow card) 27', (goal) 90+9' (pen.); Edwards (yellow card) 43'; Vázquez (yellow card) 61'	Stadium: Geodis Park; Attendance: 28,753; Referee: Chris Penso

September 17 32	Austin FC	1–1	Nashville SC	Austin, Texas
8:00 PM CT	Driussi 61'	Report	Mukhtar 56' (pen.)	Stadium: Q2 Stadium; Attendance: 20,738; Referee: Lukasz Szpala

October 2 33	Nashville SC	1–2	Houston Dynamo	Nashville, Tennessee
7:30 PM CDT	Bunbury (yellow card) 90+3'; Zimmerman 90+6'	Report	Ferreira (penalty scored) 29, 39'; Hadebe (yellow card) 48' (yellow-red card) 90+4'	Stadium: Nashville Fairgrounds Stadium; Attendance: 28,720; Referee: Guido Gonzalez Jr

October 9 34	Los Angeles FC	0–1	Nashville SC	Los Angeles, California
4:00 PM CDT		Report	McCarty (yellow card) 9'; Bunbury 53'; Anunga (yellow card) 55'; Sapong (yellow card) 81'	Stadium: Banc of California Stadium; Attendance: 22,205; Referee: Ted Unkel

==== MLS Cup Playoffs ====
===== First round =====
October 15 First round	LA Galaxy	1–0	Nashville SC	Carson, California
2:00PM CDT	Araujo 60', (yellow card) 64'; Brugman (yellow card) 79'	Report	Zimmerman (yellow card) 20'; Anunga (yellow card) 58'	Stadium: Dignity Health Sports Park; Attendance: 22,280; Referee: Armando Villarreal

=== U.S. Open Cup ===
Due to finishing in the top four of their conference in 2021, Nashville SC will enter the tournament in the Round of 32, with draws announced April 22, 2022, and matches played May 10–11, 2022. This will be their first Open Cup campaign as a member of Major League Soccer, after competing in 2018 and 2019 as a member of the United Soccer League/USL Championship.

May 11 Round of 32	Nashville SC (Tennessee)	3–2 (a.e.t.)	(Georgia (U.S. state)) Atlanta United FC	Nashville, Tennessee
7:00 pm CDT	Mukhtar 50' (pen.); Sapong 90+2'; Zubak 93'		Almada 13'; Araújo 29'	Stadium: Geodis Park

May 25 Round of 16	Louisville City FC (Kentucky)	1–2	(Tennessee) Nashville SC	Louisville, Kentucky
7:00 pm EDT	Ownby 37'; McCabe (yellow card) 86'; Gonzalez (yellow card) 90+6'	Report	Loba 39'; Haakenson (yellow card) 48'; Mukhtar 89'	Stadium: Lynn Family Stadium; Attendance: 8,638; Referee: Eric Tatersall

June 29 Quarter-final	Orlando City SC (Florida)	1–1 (a.e.t.) (6–5 p)	(Tennessee) Nashville SC	Orlando, Florida
7:00 pm	Schlegel (yellow card) 60', (goal) 90+4'; Pereyra (yellow card) 71'; Perea (yellow card) 109'	Report	Lovitz (yellow card) 39'; Mukhtar 52', (yellow card) 55'; Sapong (yellow card) 71'; McCarty (yellow card) 72'; Davis (yellow card) 87' (yellow-red card) 91'; Panicco (yellow card) 90+1'; Zubak (yellow card) 90+3'; Maher (yellow card) 102'; Anunga (yellow card) 105+1'	Stadium: Exploria Stadium; Attendance: 11,940; Referee: Mark Allatin
	Penalties
	Kara (penalty scored); Jansson (penalty scored); Perea (penalty missed); Smith (penalty scored); Pato (penalty scored); Carlos (penalty scored); Torres (penalty scored)		(penalty missed) Muyl; (penalty scored) Loba; (penalty scored) Maher; (penalty scored) Zimmerman; (penalty scored) Zubak; (penalty scored) Romney; (penalty missed) Miller

=== Leagues Cup ===
September 21 Showcase Match	Nashville SC (United States)	3–3 (4–2 p)	(Mexico) Club América	Nashville, Tennessee
		Report		Stadium: Geodis Park; Attendance: 24,553; Referee: César Arturo Ramos (Mexico)
