= Ikoba =

Ikoba is a surname. Notable people with the surname include:

- Eduvie Ikoba (born 1997), American soccer player
- Tega Ikoba (born 2003), American soccer player
