= Dario Župarić =

Croatian professional footballer (born 1992)

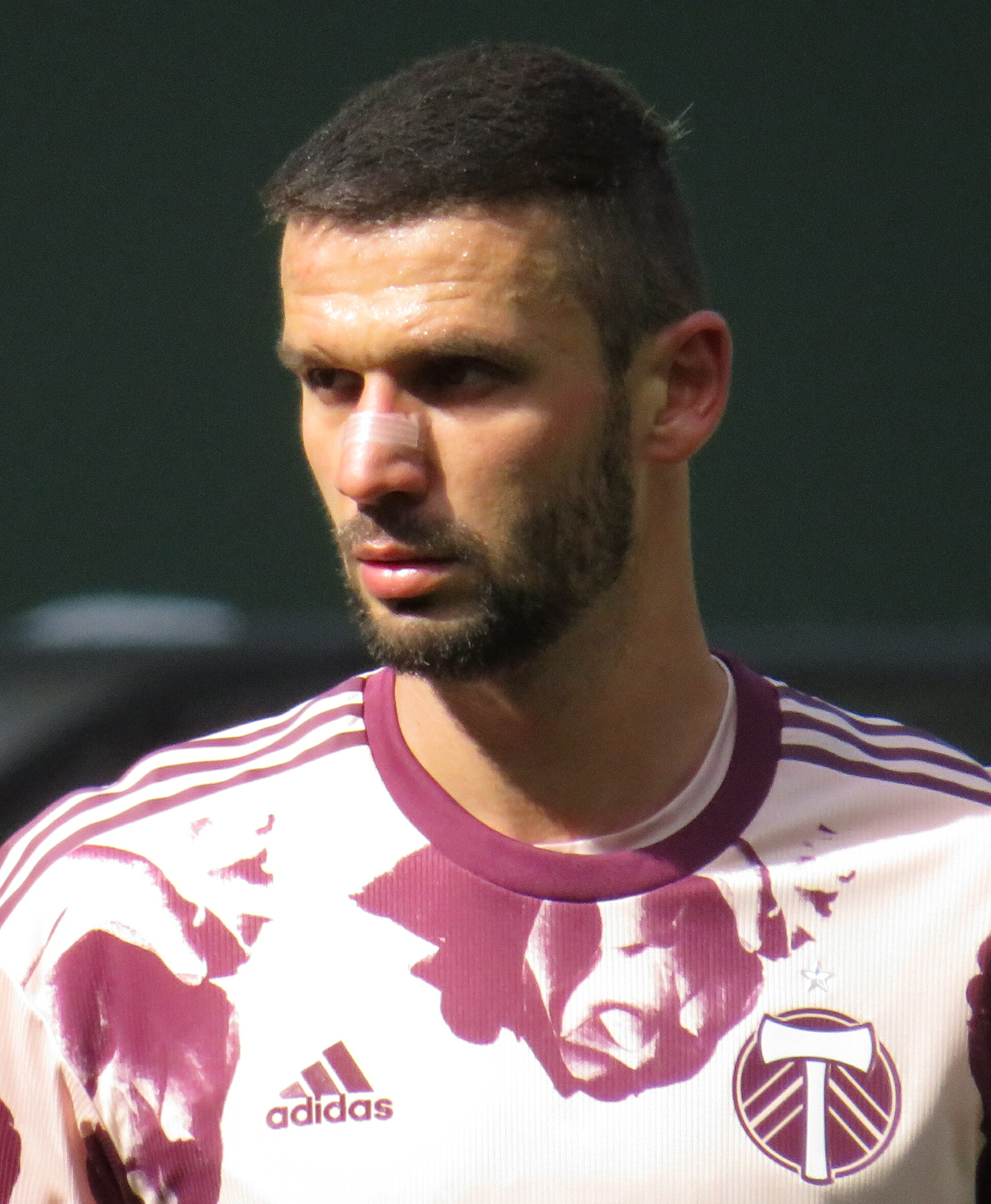

Personal information
- Date of birth: 3 May 1992 (age 34)
- Place of birth: Županja, Croatia
- Height: 1.85 m (6 ft 1 in)
- Position: Defender

Team information
- Current team: Hapoel Haifa F.C.
- Number: 13

Youth career
- 1998–2002: Sladorana Županja
- 2002–2007: Graničar Županja
- 2007–2011: Cibalia

Senior career*
Years	Team	Apps	(Gls)
2011–2013	Cibalia	58	(1)
2013–2017	Pescara	99	(1)
2017–2019	Rijeka	89	(4)
2020–2026	Portland Timbers	89	(1)
2020	Portland Timbers 2	1	(0)
2026–	Hapoel Haifa	10	(0)

International career^{‡}
2010	Bosnia and Herzegovina U19	3	(0)
2011–2013	Croatia U20	9	(1)
2011–2014	Croatia U21	10	(1)
- * Club domestic league appearances and goals as of 24 June 2026 ‡ National team caps and goals as of 10 October 2014

Dario Župarić (Croatian pronunciation: [dâːrio ʒǔparitɕ]; born 3 May 1992) is a Croatian professional footballer who plays as a defender for Hapoel Haifa.

== Club career ==
Župarić was born in Županja and played youth football with Graničar Županja before starting his professional career with Cibalia. In June 2013, he was transferred to Pescara, for a club record €700,000. In January 2017, Župarić was loaned to Rijeka in Croatia initially until June 2018, but during the loan deal he signed a permanent contract with the club until June 2020.

On 20 November 2019, Župarić joined Major League Soccer side Portland Timbers, but will stay in Rijeka on loan until the end of the year.

== International career ==
Župarić won three caps with Bosnia and Herzegovina under-19. Even though he was born in Croatia, he initially chose to play for Bosnia and Herzegovina because of his parents who are Bosnian Croats. In October 2011, he debuted for Croatia under-21 squad.

== Club statistics ==
As of match played 23 October 2024

Appearances and goals by club, season and competition
Club	Season	League			Cup		Continental		Other		Total	
Club	Season	Division	Apps	Goals	Apps	Goals	Apps	Goals	Apps	Goals	Apps	Goals
Cibalia	2010–11	1. HNL	2	0	—		—		—		2	0
Cibalia	2011–12	1. HNL	24	1	5	0	—		—		29	1
Cibalia	2012–13	1. HNL	32	0	6	0	—		—		38	0
Cibalia	Total		58	1	11	0	—		—		69	1
Pescara	2013–14	Serie B	21	1	1	0	—		—		22	1
Pescara	2014–15	Serie B	35	0	2	0	—		—		37	1
Pescara	2015–16	Serie B	36	0	2	0	—		—		38	0
Pescara	2016–17	Serie A	7	0	2	0	—		—		9	0
Pescara	Total		99	1	7	0	—		—		106	1
Rijeka	2016–17	1. HNL	11	1	1	1	—		—		12	2
Rijeka	2017–18	1. HNL	31	1	3	0	12	0	—		46	1
Rijeka	2018–19	1. HNL	30	1	4	0	2	0	—		36	1
Rijeka	2019–20	1. HNL	17	1	1	0	4	0	1	0	23	1
Rijeka	Total		89	4	9	1	18	0	1	0	117	5
Portland Timbers	2020	MLS	23	1	—		—		1	0	24	1
Portland Timbers	2021	MLS	31	0	—		3	0	4	0	38	0
Portland Timbers	2022	MLS	30	0	0	0	—		—		30	0
Portland Timbers	2023	MLS	31	1	0	0	—		3	0	34	1
Portland Timbers	2024	MLS	28	0	—		—		3	0	31	0
Portland Timbers	Total		143	2	0	0	3	0	11	0	157	2
Career total			389	8	27	1	21	0	12	0	449	9

== Honours ==
Rijeka

- Croatian First Football League: 2016–17
- Croatian Football Cup: 2016–17, 2018–19

Portland Timbers

- MLS is Back Tournament: 2020
