= Antony (footballer, born 2001) =

Brazilian footballer (born 2001)

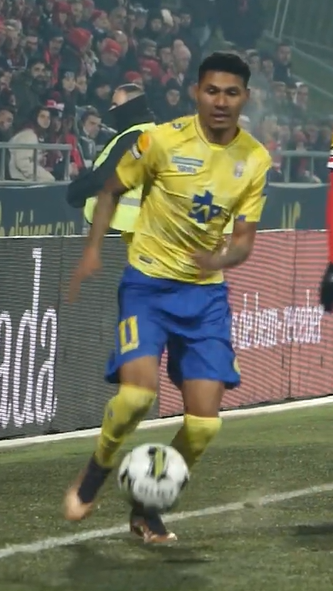
- Antony playing for Arouca in 2023

Personal information
- Full name: Antony Alves Santos
- Date of birth: 8 September 2001 (age 25)
- Place of birth: Curitiba, Brazil
- Height: 1.78 m (5 ft 10 in)
- Position: Winger

Team information
- Current team: Portland Timbers
- Number: 11

Youth career
- 2012–2015: Coritiba
- 2015–2017: Renovicente
- 2017–2021: Joinville
- 2019–2021: → Corinthians (loan)

Senior career*
Years	Team	Apps	(Gls)
2019–2022	Joinville	10	(0)
2021	→ Corinthians (loan)	3	(0)
2021–2022	→ Arouca (loan)	32	(4)
2022–2023	Arouca	22	(4)
2023–	Portland Timbers	70	(14)
- * Club domestic league appearances and goals as of 18:24, 22 December 2025 (UTC)

Antony Alves Santos (born 8 September 2001), simply known as Antony, is a Brazilian professional footballer who plays as a winger for Major League Soccer club Portland Timbers.

== Career ==
=== Joinville ===
Born in Curitiba, Paraná, Antony began his career with Coritiba, and spent a period at Associação Esportiva Renovicente before joining Joinville's youth sides. He made his first team debut on 16 January 2019, coming on as a second-half substitute for goalscorer Rafael Grampola in a 1–1 Campeonato Catarinense away draw against Brusque.

==== Loan to Corinthians ====
In July 2019, after 11 first team appearances for JEC, Antony moved to Corinthians on loan, being initially a member of the under-20 team. He made his first team debut with Timão on 3 March 2021, in a 2–2 Campeonato Paulista tie with Palmeiras.

In July 2021, after three first team appearances, Antony returned to Joinville after Corinthians opted not to exercise his buyout clause.

=== Arouca ===
On 3 August 2021, Antony moved abroad for the first time in his career and was announced at Portuguese Primeira Liga side Arouca. He made his club debut on 27 November, replacing Arsénio Nunes and scoring a last-minute winner in a 2–1 home success over Boavista.

On 1 November 2022, Arouca announced that they activated Antony's buyout clause, with the player signing a contract until 2026.

=== Portland Timbers ===
On 2 August 2023, Antony signed a deal with Major League Soccer side Portland Timbers until the end of the 2026 season.

On May 23rd, 2026, following a 1-3 home loss, Antony responded "Bla bla bla 🖕🏾" to an X post about himself posted by Timbers reporter Jeremy Peterman, one week after a similar interaction where Antony responded the same way. The comment was subject to many negative replies from Timbers fans.

== Career statistics ==
As of 22 December 2025.

Club	Season	League			State League		Cup		Continental		Other		Total	
Club	Season	Division	Apps	Goals	Apps	Goals	Apps	Goals	Apps	Goals	Apps	Goals	Apps	Goals
Joinville	2019	Série D	2	0	8	0	1	0	—		—		11	0
Corinthians	2021	Série A	0	0	3	0	0	0	0	0	—		3	0
Arouca	2021–22	Primeira Liga	21	2	—		0	0	—		—		21	2
Arouca	2022–23	Primeira Liga	33	6	—		3	0	—		6 (Note: Appearance(s) in Taça da Liga)	0	42	6
Arouca	Total		54	8	—		3	0	—		6	0	63	8
Portland Timbers	2023	Major League Soccer	9	1	—		0	0	—		—		9	1
Portland Timbers	2024	Major League Soccer	33	6	—		—		—		4 (Note: Three appearances and one goal in Leagues Cup, one appearance in MLS Cup playoffs)	1	37	7
Portland Timbers	2025	Major League Soccer	28	7	—		1	0	—		5 (Note: One appearance in Leagues Cup, four appearances in MLS Cup playoffs)	0	34	7
Portland Timbers	Total		70	14	—		1	0	—		9	1	80	15
Career total			126	22	11	0	5	0	0	0	15	1	157	23
