= Evander (footballer) =

Brazilian footballer (born 1998)

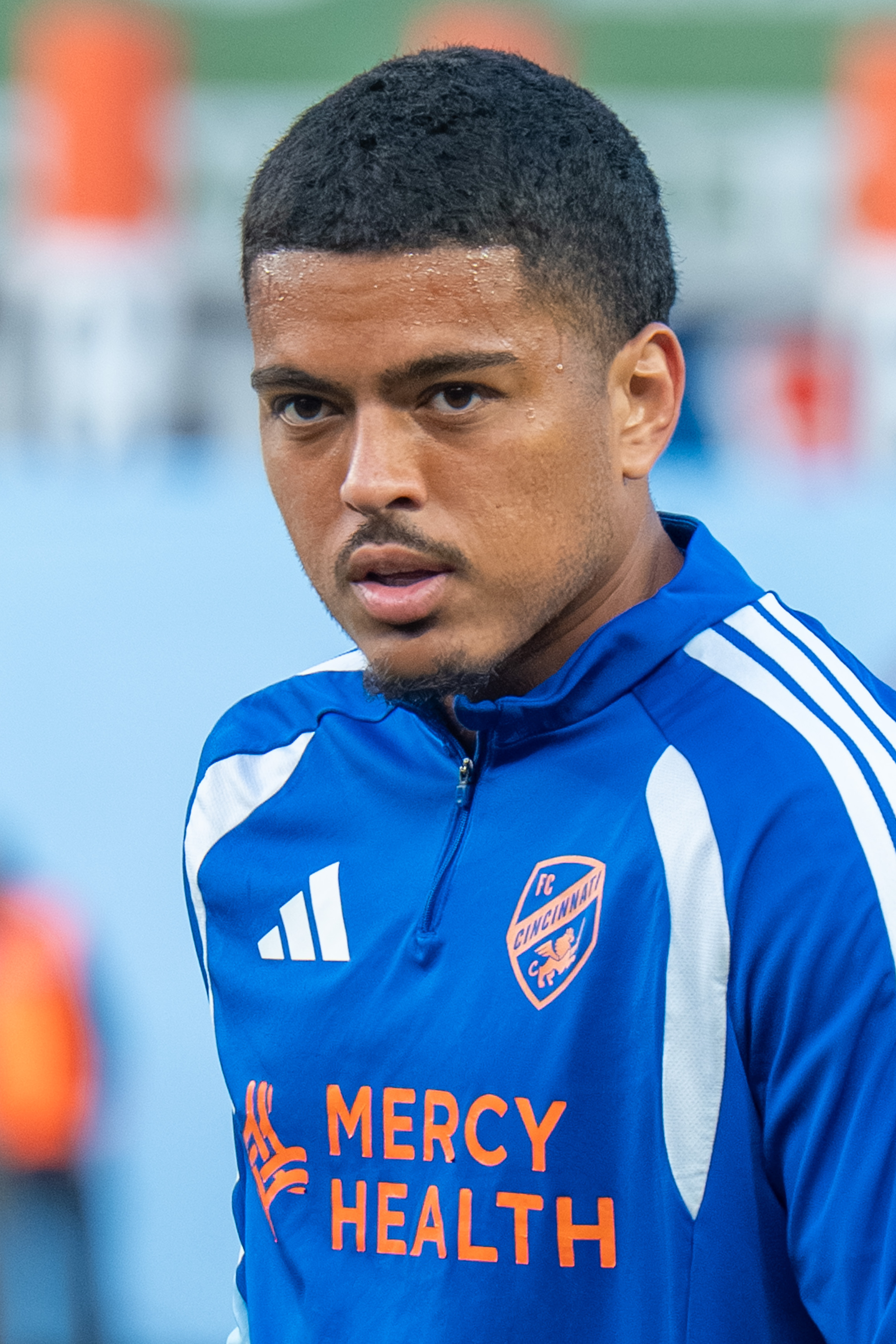
- Evander with FC Cincinnati in 2026

Personal information
- Full name: Evander da Silva Ferreira
- Date of birth: 9 June 1998 (age 28)
- Place of birth: Rio de Janeiro, Brazil
- Height: 1.78 m (5 ft 10 in)
- Position: Attacking midfielder

Team information
- Current team: FC Cincinnati
- Number: 10

Youth career
- 2007–2017: Vasco da Gama

Senior career*
Years	Team	Apps	(Gls)
2016–2019	Vasco da Gama	39	(3)
2018–2019	→ Midtjylland (loan)	26	(9)
2019–2022	Midtjylland	97	(30)
2023–2024	Portland Timbers	55	(24)
2025–	FC Cincinnati	63	(32)

International career^{‡}
2013	Brazil U15	2	(3)
2015	Brazil U17	10	(3)
- * Club domestic league appearances and goals as of 02:50, 9 November 2026 (UTC) ‡ National team caps and goals as of 30 May 2017

Evander da Silva Ferreira (born 9 June 1998), commonly known as Evander, is a Brazilian professional footballer who plays as an attacking midfielder for Major League Soccer club FC Cincinnati.

== Club career ==
=== Vasco da Gama ===
Evander debuted for Vasco da Gama on 5 March 2016 as an 85th-minute substitute in a Campeonato Carioca 3–1 win against Bonsucesso. He scored his first professional goal on 8 November 2017 against Santos in the 33rd round of Brazilian Serie A.

On 31 January 2018, Evander became the youngest Vasco da Gama's player to score twice in a Libertadores match, against Universidad de Concepción.

=== Midtjylland ===
On 27 August 2018, Vasco confirmed that Evander had been loaned out to FC Midtjylland for the 2018–19 season with a release clause of DKK18 million (around €2.4 million) for the summer of 2019.

Evander made his debut in the Danish Superliga on 29 September 2018 as a 65th-minute substitute for Jakob Poulsen in a 5–1 home win over Hobro IK. The next weekend, on 7 October, he was substituted in with 12 minutes remaining in a 3–0 win over Vendsyssel FF. On 20 October, Evander scored his first goal for Midtjylland in a 4–1 away win over FC Nordsjælland.

In January 2019, FC Midtjylland agreed with Vasco da Gama on a permanent transfer for Evander, agreeing on a future transfer worth a DKK 15m fee, lower than the original release clause. In March 2019, he won the Danish Superliga Player of the Month award.

=== Portland Timbers ===
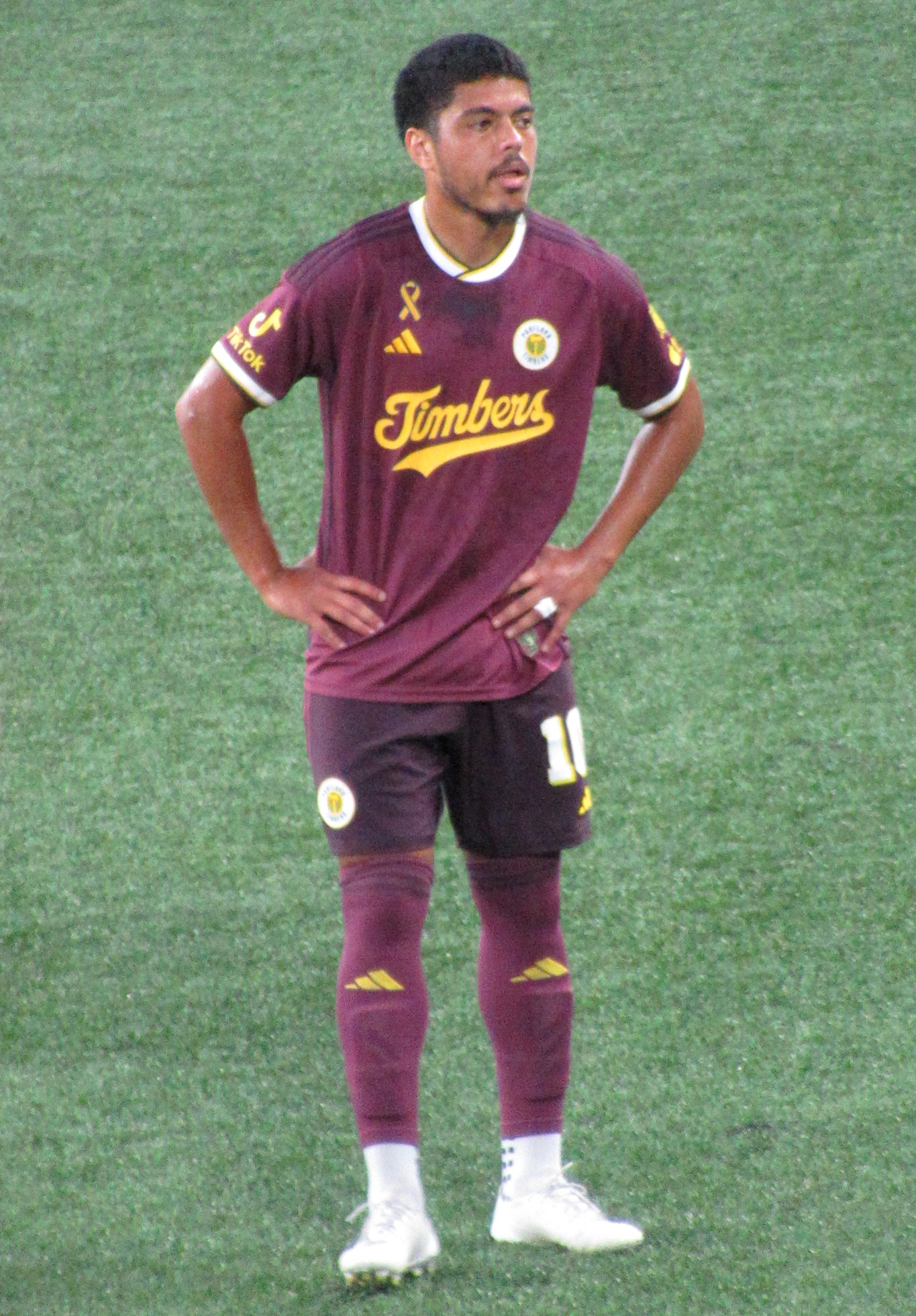
Evander with Portland Timbers in 2024

On 5 December 2022, the Portland Timbers acquired Evander in a full transfer from FC Midtjylland. Signed as a Designated Player, Evander was initially under contract through 2026 with a club option in 2027. He scored his first goal for Portland on 4 March 2023 against Los Angeles FC.

=== FC Cincinnati ===
On 17 February 2025, FC Cincinnati announced the acquisition of Evander via a cash-for-player trade from the Portland Timbers in exchange for $12 million and up to $150,000 in conditional performance-based incentives. Again as a Designated Player, Evander signed a contract with FC Cincinnati effective through the 2027 MLS season with a club option for 2028. He made his first appearance in a competitive match in a 4–1 away victory over Liga Nacional de Fútbol Profesional de Honduras club F.C. Motagua in the first round of the 2025 CONCACAF Champions Cup. Having come on as a second-half substitute, he contributed a goal and an assist.

== International career ==
In March 2015, Evander helped the Brazil U17 national team win the Under-17 South American Championship, scoring three goals. He also played at the 2015 FIFA Under-17 World Cup.

== Career statistics ==
As of match played 19 November 2026

Appearances and goals by club, season and competition
Club	Season	League			State league (Note: Includes Campeonato Carioca)		National cup (Note: Includes Copa do Brasil, Danish Cup)		Continental		Other		Total	
Club	Season	Division	Apps	Goals	Apps	Goals	Apps	Goals	Apps	Goals	Apps	Goals	Apps	Goals
Vasco da Gama	2016	Série B	10	0	1	0	5	0	—		—		16	0
Vasco da Gama	2017	Série A	9	1	3	0	—		—		—		12	1
Vasco da Gama	2018	Série A	7	0	9	2	—		8 (Note: Appearances in Copa Libertadores)	2	—		24	4
Vasco da Gama	Total		26	1	13	2	5	0	8	2	—		52	5
Midtjylland (loan)	2018–19	Danish Superliga	26	9	—		4	1	—		—		30	10
Midtjylland	2019–20	Danish Superliga	30	8	—		1	0	2 (Note: Appearances in UEFA Europa League)	1	—		33	9
Midtjylland	2020–21	Danish Superliga	28	6	—		4	1	7 (Note: Appearances in UEFA Champions League)	0	—		39	7
Midtjylland	2021–22	Danish Superliga	29	12	—		5	2	12 (Note: Four appearances and one goal in UEFA Champions League, six appearances and two goals in UEFA Europa League, two appearances in UEFA Europa Conference League)	3	—		46	17
Midtjylland	2022–23	Danish Superliga	10	4	—		1	2	8 (Note: Two appearances in UEFA Champions League, six appearances and one goal in UEFA Europa League)	1	—		19	7
Midtjylland	Total		97	30	—		11	5	29	5	—		137	40
Portland Timbers	2023	MLS	27	9	—		—		—		2 (Note: Appearances in Leagues Cup)	2	29	11
Portland Timbers	2024	MLS	28	15	—		—		—		4 (Note: Three appearances in Leagues Cup, one appearance in MLS Cup playoffs)	0	32	15
Portland Timbers	Total		55	24	—		—		—		6	2	61	26
FC Cincinnati	2025	MLS	32	18	—		—		4 (Note: Appearances in CONCACAF Champions Cup)	2	7 (Note: Three appearances and two goals in Leagues Cup, four appearances in MLS Cup playoffs)	2	43	22
FC Cincinnati	2026	MLS	31	14	—		—		3	0	4 (Note: Three appearances and two goals in Leagues Cup, one appearance and two goals in MLS Cup playoffs)	4	38	18
FC Cincinnati	Total		63	32	—		—		7	2	11	6	81	40
Career total			267	96	13	2	20	6	44	9	17	8	361	121

== Honours ==
Vasco da Gama

- Taça Guanabara: 2016
- Campeonato Carioca: 2016
- Taça Rio: 2017

Midtjylland

- Danish Superliga: 2019–20
- Danish Cup: 2018–19, 2021–22

Brazil U17

- South American U-17 Championship: 2015

Individual

- UEFA Europa League top assist provider: 2022–23
- MLS Best XI: 2024, 2025
- MLS All-Star: 2024, 2025, 2026
- MLS Player of the Month: August/September 2024, May 2026, July/August 2026
