= Eryk Williamson =

American soccer player (born 1997)

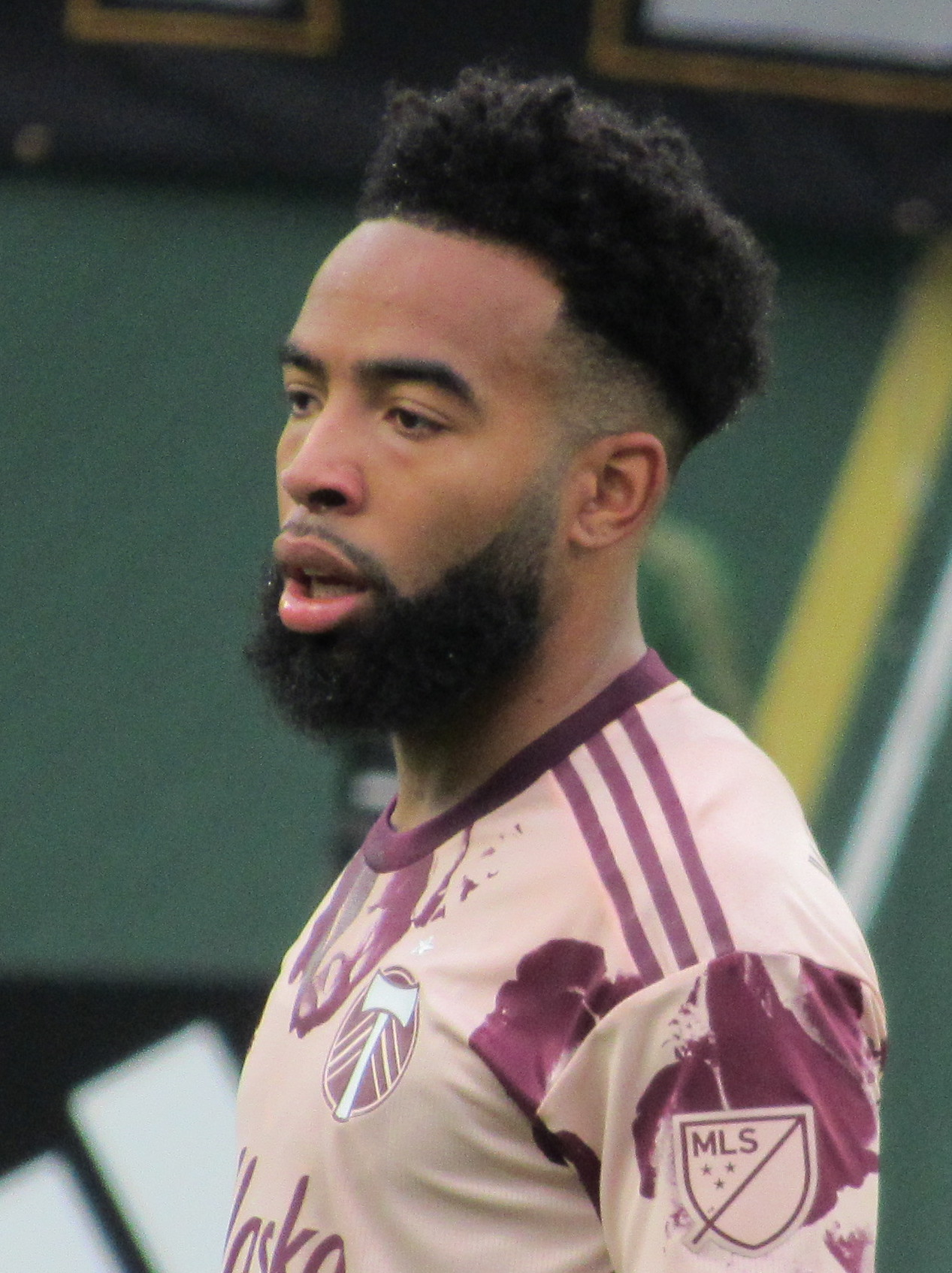
- Williamson with the Portland Timbers in 2022

Personal information
- Full name: Eryk Tyrek Williamson
- Date of birth: June 11, 1997 (age 29)
- Place of birth: Alexandria, Virginia, United States
- Height: 5 ft 9 in (1.75 m)
- Position: Midfielder

Youth career
- D.C. United

College career
Years	Team	Apps	(Gls)
2015–2017	Maryland Terrapins	58	(14)

Senior career*
Years	Team	Apps	(Gls)
2018–2024	Portland Timbers	98	(6)
2018–2020	Portland Timbers 2	34	(7)
2018	→ Santa Clara (loan)	0	(0)
2025	Charlotte FC	24	(0)

International career^{‡}
2017	United States U20	20	(4)
2019	United States U23	1	(0)
2021–2023	United States	6	(0)
Medal record
Representing United States
Winner	CONCACAF U-20 Championship	2017
Portland Timbers F.C.
Winner	MLS is Back Tournament	2020
Representing United States
Winner	CONCACAF Gold Cup	2021
- * Club domestic league appearances and goals as of October 22, 2025 ‡ National team caps and goals as of January 28, 2023

Eryk Tyrek Williamson (born June 11, 1997) is an American professional soccer player who plays as a midfielder.

== Early career ==
Williamson attended the University of Maryland, where he played in the 2015–2017 seasons, appearing in 58 matches and scoring 14 goals. In 2017, he was awarded the Big Ten Midfielder of the Year and was a member of the All-Big Ten First Team.

== Club career ==
Williamson was a member of the D.C. United Academy, and therefore not eligible for the MLS SuperDraft, before being traded to the Portland Timbers in January 2018. Williamson was linked with a move to Schalke in early 2018, but Schalke never made an offer. He made his professional debut as a member of Portland Timbers 2 on April 4, 2018, against Tulsa, and scored his first goal on May 12 of that year against Tacoma.

He made his debut for the Timbers senior team as a substitute on June 2, 2018, against the Los Angeles Galaxy, earned his first start on June 26, 2019, against Montreal, and scored his first goal on September 20, 2020, against Seattle. Williamson was a key member of the Timbers team that won the MLS is Back tournament in 2020.

Williamson had a great start to the 2021 season, highlighted by a MLS Team of the Matchday performance against San Jose where he had 2 assists.

On January 15, 2025, Williamson was dealt to Charlotte FC in exchange for $100,000 in General Allocation Money.

== International career ==
Williamson appeared for the United States U-20 team 20 times in 2017, including 5 appearances at the U-20 World Cup and 6 at the U-20 CONCACAF Championship (which the U.S. won), and played for the U-23 team once in 2019.

He made his debut with the senior national team on July 11, 2021, in a Gold Cup game against Haiti.

== Personal ==
Williamson is the cousin of the singer, actress, and producer Queen Latifah.

== Career statistics ==
=== Club ===
As of October 7, 2024

Club	Season	League			Playoffs		National cup (Note: Includes U.S. Open Cup)		Continental		Other		Total	
Club	Season	Division	Apps	Goals	Apps	Goals	Apps	Goals	Apps	Goals	Apps	Goals	Apps	Goals
Portland Timbers 2	2018	USL	15	3	—		—		—		—		15	3
Portland Timbers 2	2019	USL Championship	19	4	—		—		—		—		19	4
Portland Timbers 2	Total		34	7	—		—		—		—		34	7
Portland Timbers	2018	MLS	0	0	—		1	0	—		—		1	0
Portland Timbers	2019	MLS	7	0	—		1	0	—		—		8	0
Portland Timbers	2020	MLS	21	3	1	0	—		—		4 (Note: Four appearances in the MLS is Back Tournament knockout stage)	0	26	3
Portland Timbers	2021	MLS	14	1	—		—		4 (Note: Appearances in CONCACAF Champions Cup)	0	—		18	1
Portland Timbers	2022	MLS	22	0	—		—		—		—		22	0
Portland Timbers	2023	MLS	6	0	—		—		—		—		6	0
Portland Timbers	2024	MLS	28	2	1	0	—		—		3 (Note: Appearances in Leagues Cup)	0	32	2
Portland Timbers	Total		98	6	2	0	2	0	4	0	7	0	113	6
Charlotte FC	2025	MLS	0	0	0	0	0	0	—		—		0	0
Career total			132	13	2	0	2	0	4	0	7	0	147	13

=== International ===
As of match played January 28, 2023

Appearances and goals by national team and year
National team	Year	Apps	Goals
United States	2021	4	0
United States	2023	2	0
Total		6	0

== Honors ==
Portland Timbers

- MLS is Back Tournament: 2020

United States U20

- CONCACAF Under-20 Championship: 2017

United States

- CONCACAF Gold Cup: 2021

Individual

- Big Ten Midfielder of the Year: 2017
- All-Big Ten First Team: 2017
