= Felipe Mora =

Chilean footballer (born 1993)

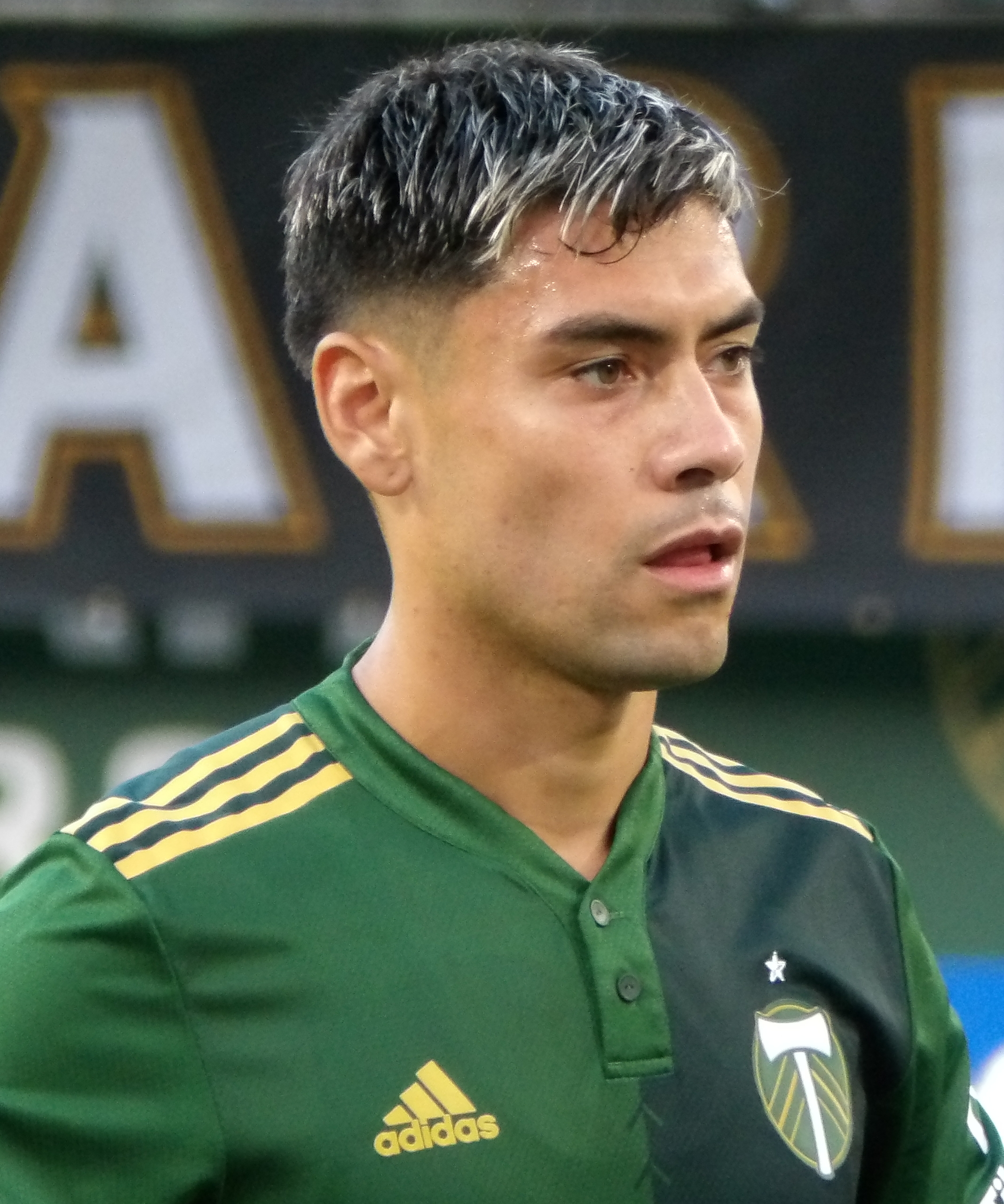
- Mora with the Portland Timbers in 2021

Personal information
- Full name: Felipe Andrés Mora Aliaga
- Date of birth: 2 August 1993 (age 33)
- Place of birth: Santiago, Chile
- Height: 1.76 m (5 ft 9 1/2 in)
- Position: Striker

Team information
- Current team: Atlético San Luis
- Number: 99

Youth career
- 2006–2013: Audax Italiano

Senior career*
Years	Team	Apps	(Gls)
2011–2016	Audax Italiano	121	(33)
2012–2014	Audax Italiano B	5	(4)
2016–2017	Universidad de Chile	26	(18)
2017–2018	Cruz Azul	33	(12)
2018	→ UNAM (loan)	37	(14)
2019–2021	UNAM	14	(1)
2020	→ Portland Timbers (loan)	23	(7)
2021–2026	Portland Timbers	135	(45)
2026–	Atlético San Luis	8	(2)

International career^{‡}
2013	Chile U20	9	(2)
2017–	Chile	11	(1)
- * Club domestic league appearances and goals as of 21 October 2026 ‡ National team caps and goals as of 23:11, 19 November 2024 (UTC)

Felipe Andrés Mora Aliaga (born 2 August 1993) is a Chilean professional footballer who plays as a striker for Liga MX club Atlético San Luis.

== Club career ==
Mora played for Major League Soccer club Portland Timbers from 2020 to 2026. On 30 July 2026, he signed with Liga MX club Atlético San Luis.

== International career ==
Mora was selected for the Chile national under-20 football team which participated in the 2013 South American Youth Championship. On 23 January, he scored a goal against Ecuador in the final stage. The team went on to qualify for Turkey 2013, where he scored a goal against Iraq in the group round.

On 31 May 2018, he made his first appearance for the Chilean senior team, when he came on the pitch in the 73rd minute of the 2–3 loss in an friendly against Romania. On 15 October 2019, he scored his first goal for the Chile national team in a 3–2 friendly win against Guinea.

== Career statistics ==
=== Club ===
As of match played on 5 July 2025

Appearances and goals by club, season and competition
Club	Season	League			Cup		League Cup		Other		Total	
Club	Season	Division	Apps	Goals	Apps	Goals	Apps	Goals	Apps	Goals	Apps	Goals
Audax Italiano	2011	Primera División of Chile	15	4	1	3	—		—		16	7
Audax Italiano	2012	Primera División of Chile	20	4	1	0	—		—		21	4
Audax Italiano	2013	Primera División of Chile	8	0	1	0	—		—		9	0
Audax Italiano	2013–14	Primera División of Chile	27	11	0	0	—		—		27	11
Audax Italiano	2014–15	Primera División of Chile	25	2	3	1	—		—		28	3
Audax Italiano	2015–16	Primera División of Chile	26	12	10	7	—		—		36	19
Audax Italiano	Total		121	33	16	11	—		—		137	44
Audax Italiano B	2012	Primera B de Chile	1	1	—		—		—		1	1
Audax Italiano B	2013	Primera B de Chile	3	2	—		—		—		3	2
Audax Italiano B	2013–14	Primera B de Chile	1	1	—		—		—		1	1
Audax Italiano B	Total		5	4	—		—		—		5	4
Universidad de Chile	2016–17	Chilean Primera División	26	18	2	1	—		2	1	30	20
Cruz Azul	2017–18	Liga MX	31	12	7	2	—		—		38	14
UNAM	2018–19	Liga MX	37	14	11	2	—		—		48	16
UNAM	2019–20	Liga MX	14	1	3	2	—		—		17	3
UNAM	Total		51	15	14	4	—		—		65	19
Portland Timbers (loan)	2020	Major League Soccer	23	7	—		—		1	0	24	7
Portland Timbers	2021	Major League Soccer	29	11	—		4	2	4	2	37	15
Portland Timbers	2022	Major League Soccer	7	1	0	0	—		—		7	1
Portland Timbers	2023	Major League Soccer	15	6	0	0	—		3	1	18	7
Portland Timbers	2024	Major League Soccer	29	14	—		—		4	0	33	14
Portland Timbers	2025	Major League Soccer	20	5	1	0	—		—		21	5
Portland Timbers	Total		123	44	1	0	4	2	12	3	140	47
Career totals			306	111	26	14	4	2	14	4	350	129

=== International ===
As of match played on 19 November 2024

Appearances and goals by national team and year
National team	Year	Apps	Goals
Chile	2018	2	0
Chile	2019	3	1
Chile	2020	2	0
Chile	2022	2	0
Chile	2024	2	0
Total		11	0

As of match played on 8 June 2021. Scores and results list Chile's goal tally first.

No.	Date	Venue	Opponent	Score	Result	Competition
1.	15 October 2019	Estadio José Rico Pérez, Alicante, Spain	Guinea	2–1	3–2	Friendly

== Honours ==
Universidad de Chile

- Primera División de Chile: 2017-C

Portland Timbers

- MLS is Back Tournament: 2020
- MLS Western Conference: 2021

Individual

- Primera División de Chile top scorer: (13) 2017-C
- 2023 MLS Team of the Matchday: Matchday 32
- 2024 MLS Team of the Matchday: Matchday 8 (Bench), Matchday 16 (Bench)
