= Juan David Mosquera =

Colombian footballer (born 2002)

Personal information
- Full name: Juan David Mosquera López
- Date of birth: 5 September 2002 (age 24)
- Place of birth: Cali, Colombia
- Height: 1.80 m (5 ft 11 in)
- Position: Defender

Team information
- Current team: Portland Timbers
- Number: 29

Youth career
- –2018: Club Carlos Sarmiento Lora
- 2018–2020: Independiente Medellín

Senior career*
Years	Team	Apps	(Gls)
2020–2022	Independiente Medellín	48	(3)
2022–	Portland Timbers	32	(1)

International career^{‡}
2023–	Colombia	2	(0)
- * Club domestic league appearances and goals as of 24 October 2023 ‡ National team caps and goals as of 23:30, 16 December 2023 (UTC)

Juan David Mosquera López (born 5 September 2002) is a Colombian professional footballer who plays as a full-back for Major League Soccer club Portland Timbers.

== Career statistics ==
=== Club ===
As of October 22, 2023

Club	Season	League			Cup		Continental		Other		Total	
Club	Season	Division	Apps	Goals	Apps	Goals	Apps	Goals	Apps	Goals	Apps	Goals
Independiente Medellín	2020	Categoría Primera A	11	0	0	0	3 (Note: Appearances in the Copa Libertadores)	0	0	0	14	0
Independiente Medellín	2021	Categoría Primera A	16	0	1	0	0	0	0	0	17	0
Independiente Medellín	2022	Categoría Primera A	21	3	1	0	7 (Note: Appearances in the Copa Sudamerica)	0	0	0	29	0
Independiente Medellín	Total		48	3	2	0	10	0	0	0	60	3
Portland Timbers	2022	MLS	3	0	—		—		—		3	0
Portland Timbers	2023	MLS	29	1	1	0	—		3 (Note: Appearances in the Leagues Cup)	0	33	1
Portland Timbers	Total		32	1	1	0	—		3	0	36	1
Career total			60	4	3	0	10	0	3	0	76	4

=== International ===
As of match played 16 December 2023

Appearances and goals by national team and year
National team	Year	Apps	Goals
Colombia	2023	2	0
Total		2	0
