= Zac McGraw =

Canadian soccer player (born 1997)

Personal information
- Full name: Zachery Louis McGraw
- Date of birth: June 8, 1997 (age 29)
- Place of birth: Torrance, California, US
- Height: 6 ft 4 in (1.93 m)
- Position: Defender

Team information
- Current team: Portland Timbers
- Number: 18

Youth career
- FC Golden State

College career
Years	Team	Apps	(Gls)
2016–2019	Army Black Knights	68	(1)

Senior career*
Years	Team	Apps	(Gls)
2020–	Portland Timbers	78	(2)
2022	→ Portland Timbers 2 (loan)	4	(2)

International career^{‡}
2023–	Canada	4	(0)
- * Club domestic league appearances and goals as of March 16, 2025 ‡ National team caps and goals as of July 9, 2023

Zachery Louis McGraw (born June 8, 1997) is a professional soccer player who plays as a defender for Major League Soccer team Portland Timbers. Born in the United States, he plays for the Canada national team.

== Youth and college ==
McGraw played as part of the USSDA academy side FC Golden State, graduated from West High School (Torrance, California) in 2015, before playing college soccer at the United States Military Academy in 2016. McGraw made 68 appearances for the Black Knights over four seasons, scoring a single goal and tallying 9 assists. McGraw, who was a four-time First Team All-Patriot League honoree and earned two USCA First Team All-Northeast Region recognition's in 2017 and 2018, and was named a 2019 USCA Third Team All-Northeast Region honoree. His wife, Kaitlin, was a defender and captain for Long Beach State University. Their son, Trey, was born January 28, 2025.

== Club career ==
On January 13, 2020, McGraw was drafted 68th overall in the 2020 MLS SuperDraft by Portland Timbers. He became the first ever Army player drafted in MLS history. McGraw signed with the Timbers on June 22, 2020.

McGraw made his first appearance for Portland on May 1, 2021, starting in a 4–1 loss to FC Dallas. He scored his first MLS goal for Portland on September 1, 2022, netting the game-winner in a 2–1 victory over Austin FC.

== International career ==
McGraw was born in the United States, to an American father and Canadian mother. He holds both American and Canadian nationality. In June 2023, he was named to Canada's preliminary roster for the 2023 CONCACAF Gold Cup . On June 19 McGraw was named to the final 23-man squad. He made his debut in the opening match on June 27 against Guadeloupe.

== Personal life ==
In November 2023, McGraw got engaged to former fellow soccer player Kaitlin Fregulia. The couple welcomed their first child, a son, on January 29, 2025.

== Career statistics ==
=== Club ===
As of match played August 2, 2025

Appearances and goals by club, season and competition
Club	Season	League			National cup		Continental		Other		Total	
Club	Season	Division	Apps	Goals	Apps	Goals	Apps	Goals	Apps	Goals	Apps	Goals
Portland Timbers	2021	Major League Soccer	11	0	—		1 (Note: Appearance in CONCACAF Champions League)	0	—		12	0
Portland Timbers	2022	Major League Soccer	22	1	1	0	—		—		23	1
Portland Timbers	2023	Major League Soccer	28	1	0	0	—		3 (Note: Appearances in Leagues Cup)	0	31	1
Portland Timbers	2024	Major League Soccer	13	0	—		—		2	2	15	2
Portland Timbers	2025	Major League Soccer	4	0	1	1	0	0	2	0	7	1
Portland Timbers	Total		78	2	2	1	1	0	7	2	88	5
Portland Timbers 2 (loan)	2022	MLS Next Pro	4	2	—		—		—		4	2
Career total			82	4	2	1	1	0	7	2	92	7

=== International ===
As of match played July 9, 2023

Appearances and goals by national team and year
National team	Year	Apps	Goals
Canada	2023	4	0
Total		4	0
