= Justin Rasmussen =

American soccer player

Personal information
- Date of birth: December 15, 1998 (age 27)
- Place of birth: Las Vegas, Nevada, United States
- Height: 6 ft 0 in (1.83 m)
- Positions: Winger; left-back

Youth career
- Las Vegas Sports Academy

College career
Years	Team	Apps	(Gls)
2017–2021	Grand Canyon Antelopes	55	(16)

Senior career*
Years	Team	Apps	(Gls)
2018	FC Arizona	0	(0)
2019	Orange County SC U23	0	(0)
2021	Portland Timbers U23	0	(0)
2022–2023	Portland Timbers	15	(0)
2022–2023	Portland Timbers 2	22	(0)
2024–2025	Oakland Roots	40	(2)
- * Club domestic league appearances and goals as of October 30, 2025

Justin Rasmussen (born December 15, 1998) is an American professional soccer player who plays as a left-back. He is a free agent, and his most recent club is Oakland Roots.

== Youth and college ==
Rasmussen played high school soccer at Bishop Gorman High School, where he was named Nevada State Offensive MVP two consecutive years and high school Offensive Player of the Year. In 2016, he was named second team All-Star, and as a senior was named to the Class 4A All-Southern Nevada team. Rasmussen also played club soccer with the Las Vegas Sports Academy.

In 2017, Rasmussen attended Grand Canyon University to play college soccer. In four seasons with the Antelopes, Rasmussen made 55 appearances, scoring 16 goals and tallying ten assists. In his senior year (2021), Rasmussen recorded nine goals and six assists in 20 games for a team-best 24 points, earning WAC Offensive Player of the Year and All-WAC First Team honors. Rasmussen became third-team All-America, the first All-American in Grand Canyon history after scoring five goals in 10 appearances, landing himself on the United Soccer Coaches All-Far West Region First Team and featured on the Hermann Trophy watch list.

While at college, Rasmussen was part of the setup for National Premier Soccer League side FC Arizona in 2018, and with USL Premier Development League side Orange County SC U-23 in 2019, and in 2021 he was with the Portland Timbers U23, in what was now named the USL League Two. However, he didn't make an appearance for any team.

== Professional career ==
On January 11, 2022, Rasmussen was selected 27th overall in the 2022 MLS SuperDraft by Portland Timbers. He signed with the club on February 17, 2022. He made his professional debut on March 13, 2022, starting in a 1–0 victory against Austin FC.

Following his release from Portland at the end of their 2023 season, Rasmussen joined USL Championship side Oakland Roots on February 2, 2024. He still being in the squad for the 2025 USL Championship season, but soon to be released.

== Personal life ==
Beside soccer, his favorite pastime is Golfing.

== Career statistics ==
=== Club ===
As of April 26, 2023

Club	Season	League			National cup		Continental		Other		Total	
Club	Season	Division	Apps	Goals	Apps	Goals	Apps	Goals	Apps	Goals	Apps	Goals
Portland Timbers	2022	MLS	9	0	1	0	—		—		10	0
Portland Timbers	2023	MLS	6	0	2	1	—		—		8	1
Portland Timbers	Total		15	0	3	1	—		—		18	1
Portland Timbers 2	2022	MLS Next Pro	11	0	—		—		—		11	0
Career total			26	0	3	1	0	0	0	0	29	1
