= Claudio Bravo (footballer, born 1997) =

Argentine association football player

Personal information
- Full name: Claudio Nicolás Bravo
- Date of birth: 13 March 1997 (age 29)
- Place of birth: Lomas de Zamora, Argentina
- Height: 1.70 m (5 ft 7 in)
- Position: Left-back

Team information
- Current team: Argentinos Juniors
- Number: 26

Youth career
- Banfield

Senior career*
Years	Team	Apps	(Gls)
2016–2020	Banfield	49	(0)
2020–2025	Portland Timbers	108	(2)
2025–	Argentinos Juniors	10	(0)

International career^{‡}
2020–2021	Argentina U23	12	(0)
- * Club domestic league appearances and goals as of 17:29, 10 July 2026 (UTC) ‡ National team caps and goals as of 28 July 2021

Claudio Nicolás Bravo (born 13 March 1997) is an Argentine professional footballer who plays as a left-back for Argentinos Juniors.

== Club career ==
After starting out at a local team in Villa Rita, Lomas de Zamora, Bravo later joined the academy of Banfield; having previously had trials with Vélez Sarsfield, Lanús and Los Andes. At senior level, he was an unused substitute once during the 2016 Primera División season, which preceded his professional debut arriving on 24 September 2017 as Banfield put four unanswered goals past Rosario Central away from home. Eight further appearances followed in 2017–18. He featured in continental football for the first time in July 2018, playing the full duration of a second stage first leg loss to Boston River. He was sent off in his last match for the club on 4 December 2020 versus Rosario Central.

=== Portland Timbers ===
On 17 December 2020, Bravo joined Major League Soccer club Portland Timbers for an undisclosed fee. Bravo underwent a successful surgery on his right knee in January 2024.

=== Argentinos Juniors ===
On 3 July 2025, Bravo was transferred to Argentine Primera División side Argentinos Juniors for an undisclosed fee.

== International career ==
In November 2015, Bravo was selected to train with the Argentina U20s under manager Humberto Grondona. September 2019 saw Bravo receive a call-up to the U23s for a friendly with Bolivia. For the latter, Bravo appeared six times at the 2020 CONMEBOL Pre-Olympic Tournament; which they won.

== Career statistics ==
As of 22 October 2022.

Club statistics
Club	Season	League			National Cup		League Cup		Continental		Other		Total	
Club	Season	Division	Apps	Goals	Apps	Goals	Apps	Goals	Apps	Goals	Apps	Goals	Apps	Goals
Banfield	2016	Primera División	0	0	0	0	—		—		0	0	0	0
Banfield	2016–17	Primera División	0	0	0	0	—		—		0	0	0	0
Banfield	2017–18	Primera División	9	0	0	0	—		0	0	0	0	9	0
Banfield	2018–19	Primera División	17	0	1	0	2	0	2 (Note: Appearance(s) in the Copa Sudamericana)	0	0	0	22	0
Banfield	2019–20	Primera División	17	0	1	0	1	0	0	0	0	0	19	0
Banfield	2020–21 (Note: Soccerway counts Copa de la Liga Profesional appearances as league appearances.)	Primera División	6	0	0	0	0	0	0	0	0	0	6	0
Banfield	Total		49	0	2	0	3	0	2	0	0	0	56	0
Portland Timbers	2021	Major League Soccer	23	0	4	0	—		0	0	0	0	27	0
Portland Timbers	2022	Major League Soccer	26	0	0	0	—		0	0	0	0	26	0
Portland Timbers	Total		49	0	4	0	0	0	0	0	0	0	53	0
Career total			98	0	6	0	3	0	2	0	0	0	109	0

== Honours ==
Argentina U23

- Pre-Olympic Tournament: 2020
