= Tega Ikoba =

American soccer player (born 2003)

Personal information
- Full name: Tega Ikoba
- Date of birth: August 14, 2003 (age 23)
- Place of birth: Bettendorf, Iowa, United States
- Height: 6 ft 3 in (1.91 m)
- Position: Forward

Youth career
- 2018–2021: Portland Timbers

College career
Years	Team	Apps	(Gls)
2021	North Carolina Tar Heels	18	(6)

Senior career*
Years	Team	Apps	(Gls)
2020–2024	Portland Timbers 2	46	(13)
2022–2024	Portland Timbers	8	(1)
2024	→ Indy Eleven (loan)	9	(1)
2025	FC Cincinnati 2	15	(2)
2026	Sporting Kansas City II	22	(10)

International career
2023–	United States U23	5	(2)
- * Club domestic league appearances and goals as of 12:30, 25 February 2026 (CST)

Tega Ikoba (born August 14, 2003), is an American professional soccer player who plays as a forward.

== Club career ==
After playing with the Portland Timbers academy from 2018, Ikoba appeared for Portland's USL Championship side Portland Timbers 2 on September 2, 2020, as a 57th-minute substitute in a 2–1 loss to Sacramento Republic.

On January 11, 2022, Ikoba signed for the Portland Timbers as a homegrown player.

Ikoba made his MLS debut on May 14, 2022, against Sporting Kansas City. He scored his first MLS goal in a 5–1 loss against Atlanta United FC on March 18, 2023.

On March 22, 2024, it was announced that Ikoba would join USL Championship side Indy Eleven on loan for the 2024 season, with the option for Portland to recall him throughout the season. Ikoba made his debut for Indy Eleven on March 23, 2024, coming on as a substitute for Tyler Gibson in the 61st minute in a 1–1 draw against Sacramento Republic. He made his first start for the Indianapolis-based club in a 2–1 home defeat to Detroit City FC on March 30. Ikoba scored his first goal for the Eleven on April 13, 2024, scoring the team's first goal of the match in a 4–2 home defeat to the Charleston Battery.

The Timbers recalled Ikoba from his loan on July 3. He scored a hat-trick for Portland Timbers 2 in MLS NEXT Pro on July 27, in a 5–2 home victory over Sporting Kansas City II. His performance won him the MLS NEXT Pro Player of the Matchweek award. Ikoba's contract option with the Timbers was declined following the 2024 season.

On January 31, 2025, FC Cincinnati 2 announced they had signed Ikoba to an MLS Next Pro contract ahead of the 2025 season. He made his debut for the club in a 1–0 home defeat to Toronto FC II on March 9, 2025. Ikoba scored his first goal for the club on April 9 in a 2–2 away draw against New York City FC II.

== Personal life ==
Born in the United States, Ikoba is of Nigerian descent.
