= Eric Miller (soccer) =

American soccer player (born 1993)

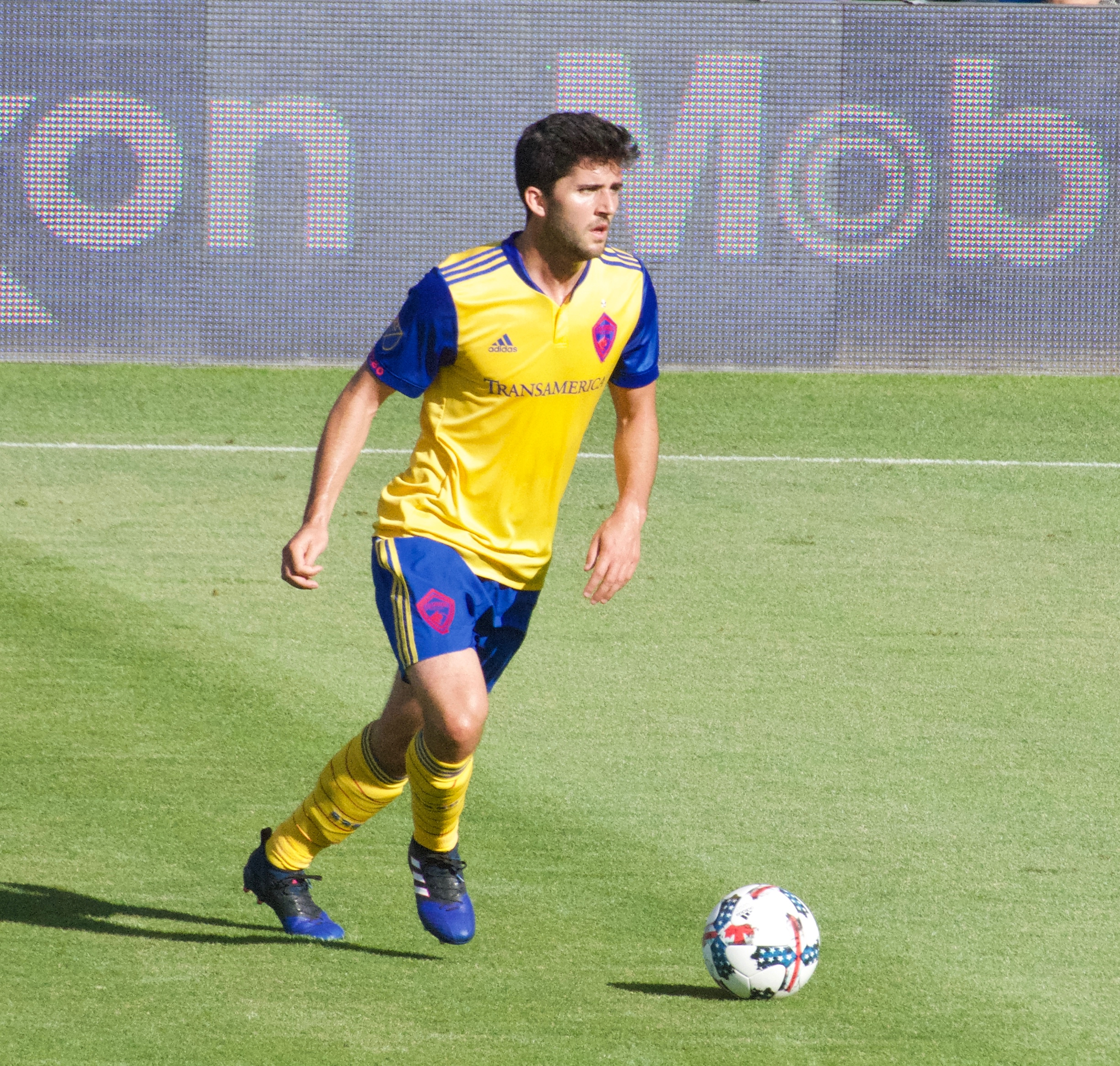
- Miller with the Colorado Rapids in 2017

Personal information
- Full name: Eric Miller
- Date of birth: January 15, 1993 (age 33)
- Place of birth: Jacksonville, Florida, United States
- Height: 6 ft 1 in (1.85 m)
- Position: Defender

Team information
- Current team: Portland Timbers
- Number: 15

Youth career
- Bangu Tsunami
- Minnesota Thunder

College career
Years	Team	Apps	(Gls)
2011–2013	Creighton Bluejays	63	(4)

Senior career*
Years	Team	Apps	(Gls)
2012–2013	Portland Timbers U23s	12	(3)
2014–2015	Montreal Impact	30	(0)
2015	→ FC Montreal (loan)	1	(0)
2016–2018	Colorado Rapids	56	(0)
2018–2019	Minnesota United	24	(0)
2019	New York City	5	(0)
2020–2022	Nashville SC	43	(0)
2023–	Portland Timbers	51	(1)
2023	Portland Timbers 2	1	(0)

International career^{‡}
2012–2013	United States U20	11	(0)
2015–2016	United States U23	5	(0)
Medal record
Representing United States
Runner-up	CONCACAF U-20 Championship	2013
- * Club domestic league appearances and goals as of April 1, 2025 ‡ National team caps and goals as of February 14, 2016

Eric Miller (born January 15, 1993) is an American professional soccer player who plays as a defender for Major League Soccer club Portland Timbers.

== Club career ==
=== Early career ===
Born in Jacksonville, Florida and raised in Woodbury, Minnesota, Miller started playing soccer for the Bangu Tsunami and Minnesota Thunder Academy. In 2011 Miller won the Gatorade Player of the Year award and the Mr. Soccer Award for the state of Minnesota after scoring 16 goals and gaining 15 assists in his final year at Woodbury High School. He then went to Creighton University where he played for the Creighton Bluejays. Miller also played for two seasons with the Portland Timbers U23s in the USL PDL.

=== Montreal Impact ===
Miller was drafted by the Montreal Impact of Major League Soccer in the 2014 MLS SuperDraft with the fifth pick in the first round. He made his professional debut for the Impact on March 8, 2014, against FC Dallas.

=== Colorado Rapids ===
In February 2016, Miller was traded to Colorado Rapids in exchange for a first-round selection in the 2018 MLS SuperDraft and general allocation money.

=== Minnesota United ===
Miller, as well as $50,000 in General Allocation Money, was traded from Colorado to Minnesota on May 1, 2018. Colorado received Sam Nicholson in return, as well as an International Spot.

=== NYCFC ===
Miller was traded from Minnesota United to New York City FC on July 29, 2019, for $50,000 in General Allocation Money.

=== Nashville SC ===
On November 26, 2019, Miller was selected by Nashville SC in the 2019 MLS Re-Entry Draft.

=== Portland Timbers ===
On February 25, 2023, Miller signed as a free agent with Portland Timbers.

== International career ==
In January 2016, Miller received his first call up to the senior United States squad for friendlies against Iceland and Canada.

== Personal life ==
Miller has been in a relationship with Kassey Kallman since 2009. They married at the end of 2018.

== Career statistics ==
As of match played 23 October 2024

Appearances and goals by club, season and competition
Club	Season	League			Playoffs		National cup		Continental		Other		Total	
Club	Season	Division	Apps	Goals	Apps	Goals	Apps	Goals	Apps	Goals	Apps	Goals	Apps	Goals
Montreal Impact	2014	MLS	21	0	—		0	0	1	0	—		22	0
Montreal Impact	2015	MLS	9	0	0	0	2	0	1	0	—		12	0
Montreal Impact	Total		30	0	0	0	2	0	2	0	—		34	0
FC Montreal (loan)	2015	USL	1	0	—		—		—		—		1	0
Colorado Rapids	2016	MLS	26	0	4	0	1	0	—		—		31	0
Colorado Rapids	2017	MLS	30	0	0	0	0	0	—		—		30	0
Colorado Rapids	Total		56	0	4	0	1	0	—		—		61	0
Minnesota United	2018	MLS	18	0	—		1	0	—		—		19	0
Minnesota United	2019	MLS	6	0	—		3	0	—		—		9	0
Minnesota United	Total		24	0	—		4	0	—		—		28	0
New York City FC	2019	MLS	5	0	0	0	—		—		—		5	0
Nashville SC	2020	MLS	6	0	1	0	—		—		—		7	0
Nashville SC	2021	MLS	13	0	2	0	—		—		—		15	0
Nashville SC	2022	MLS	24	0	0	0	2	0	—		1	0	27	0
Nashville SC	Total		43	0	3	0	2	0	—		1	0	49	0
Portland Timbers	2023	MLS	21	0	0	0	1	0	—		0	0	22	0
Portland Timbers	2024	MLS	25	1	1	0	—		—		2	0	28	1
Portland Timbers	Total		46	1	1	0	1	0	—		2	0	50	1
Career Total			205	1	8	0	10	0	2	0	3	0	228	1

== Honors ==
Montreal Impact

- Canadian Championship: 2014
