= Santiago Moreno (footballer) =

Colombian footballer (born 2000)

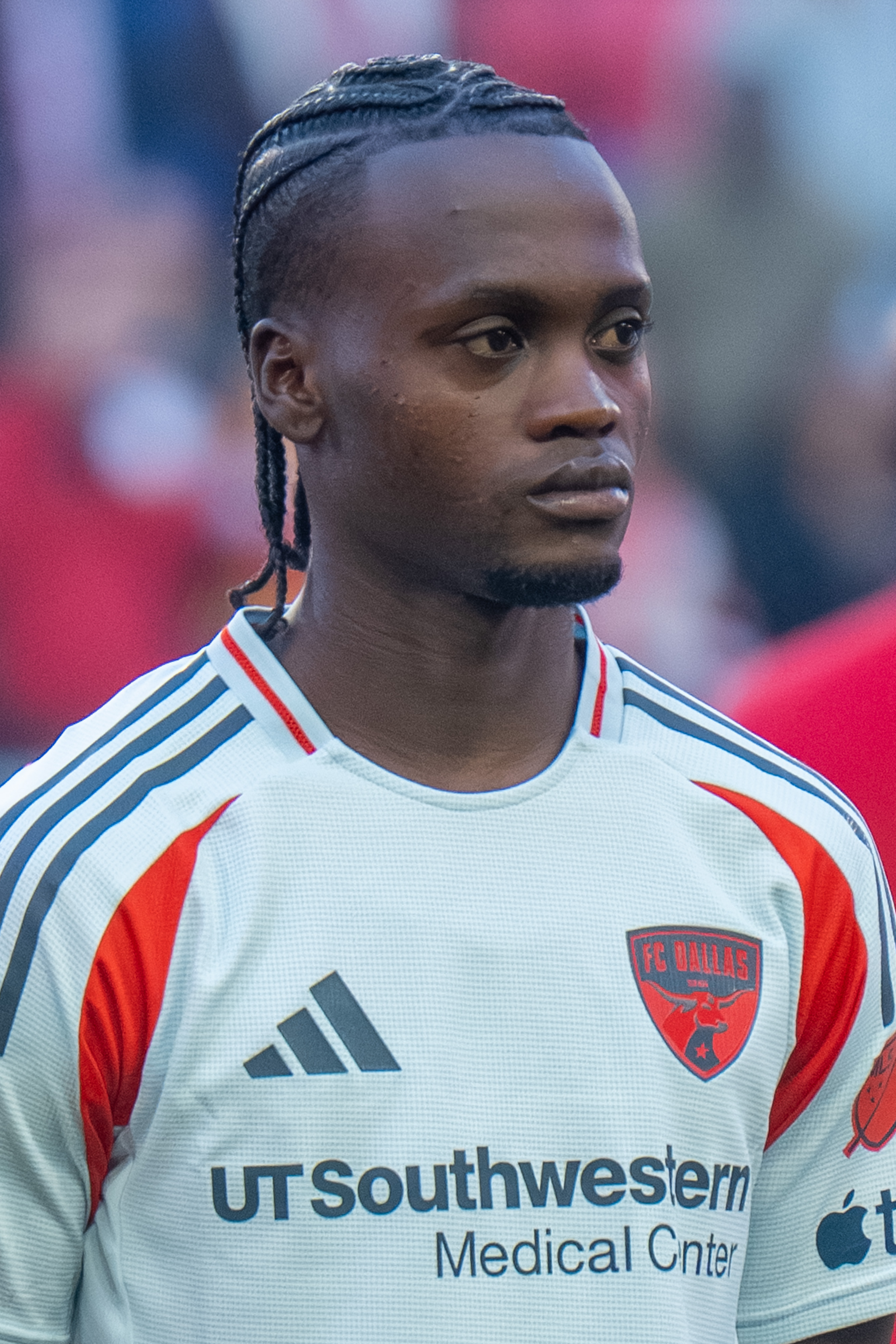
- Moreno with FC Dallas in 2026

Personal information
- Date of birth: 21 April 2000 (age 26)
- Place of birth: Cali, Colombia
- Height: 1.73 m (5 ft 8 in)
- Position: Winger

Team information
- Current team: FC Dallas (on loan from Fluminense)
- Number: 10

Senior career*
Years	Team	Apps	(Gls)
2019–2021	América de Cali	41	(7)
2021–2025	Portland Timbers	131	(20)
2025–	Fluminense	13	(0)
2026–	→ FC Dallas (loan)	29	(5)

International career^{‡}
2022–	Colombia	1	(0)
- * Club domestic league appearances and goals as of 13 December 2025 ‡ National team caps and goals as of 10:50, 17 December 2024 (UTC)

Santiago Moreno (born 21 April 2000) is a Colombian professional footballer who plays as a winger for MLS club FC Dallas, on loan from Fluminense.

== Career ==
=== Portland Timbers ===
On 29 July 2021, Moreno signed with MLS side Portland Timbers on a contract until 2025.

On 4 December 2021, Moreno scored for the Timbers against MLS side Real Salt Lake in the 2021 MLS Cup Playoffs to help send the Timbers to the MLS Cup Final.

== Career statistics ==
=== Club ===
As of 16 July 2022

Club	Season	League			National cup		Continental		Total	
Club	Season	Division	Apps	Goals	Apps	Goals	Apps	Goals	Apps	Goals
América de Cali	2019	Categoría Primera A	5	1	1 (Note: Appearances in the Copa Colombia)	0	0	0	6	1
América de Cali	2020	Categoría Primera A	17	2	2	1	4	1	23	4
América de Cali	2021	Categoría Primera A	19	4	2 (Note: Appearances in the Superliga Colombiana)	0	7	2	28	6
Portland Timbers	2021	Major League Soccer	13	0	0	0	0	0	13	0
Portland Timbers	2022	Major League Soccer	20	4	1	0	0	0	21	4
Career total			74	11	6	1	11	3	91	15
