= 2020 Portland Timbers season =

Portland Timbers
2020 season
- President: Merritt Paulson
- Head coach: Giovanni Savarese
- Stadium: Providence Park; Portland, Oregon (Capacity: 25,218)
- Major League Soccer: Conference: 3rd Overall: 8th
- MLS Cup Playoffs: First round
- U.S. Open Cup: Canceled
- Leagues Cup: Canceled
- MLS is Back Tournament: Winners
- Top goalscorer: League: Jeremy Ebobisse; Diego Valeri (8 each); All: Jeremy Ebobisse; Diego Valeri (9 each)
- Highest home attendance: Preseason: 13,920; Regular season: 25,218; MLS Playoffs:
- Lowest home attendance: Preseason: 13,882; Regular season: 25,218; MLS Playoffs:
- Average home league attendance: Preseason: 13,901; Regular season: 25,218; MLS Playoffs:
- Biggest win: SJ 1–6 POR (September 19)
- Biggest defeat: POR 0–3 SEA (August 23)
Primary colors	Secondary colors
- All statistics correct as of August 14, 2020.

The 2020 Portland Timbers season was the 34th season in their existence and the 10th season for the Portland Timbers in Major League Soccer (MLS), the top-flight professional soccer league in the United States and Canada.

== Season review by month ==
=== Off season ===
On October 29, Portland re-signed midfielder Sebastián Blanco to a multiyear contract where he will remain a Designated Player.

On October 31, forward Jeremy Ebobisse was called up to the U.S. Men's National Team pre-camp.

On November 6, Andy Polo was called up by Peru for friendlies against Colombia and Chile. Renzo Zambrano was called up by Venezuela for a friendly against Japan on November 19. Bill Tuiloma was called up by New Zealand for friendlies against the Republic of Ireland on November 14 and Lithuania on November 17. Jorge Moreira was called up for Paraguay for friendlies against Bulgaria on November 14 and Saudi Arabia on November 19.

On November 15, MLS cut Portland forward, Brian Fernández, since he failed to comply with the league's Substance Abuse and Behavioral Health (SABH) Program.

On November 19, Nashville SC selected left-back Zarek Valentin as the fourth overall pick in the 2019 MLS Expansion Draft. Portland will receive $50,000 in General Allocation Money for the selection.

On November 20, Portland signed Croatian center-back Dario Župarić from Prva HNL side, HNK Rijeka. He will occupy an international slot on the Timbers roster.

On November 21, Portland announced its 2020 initial roster changes. Portland declined options on goalkeeper Kendall McIntosh, defender Modou Jadama and forward Foster Langsdorf. Claude Dielna is out of contract. Portland also did not exercise the 2020 contract option for midfielder Diego Valeri; however, remain in discussions with him.

On December 6, midfielder Marvin Loría was called up by the Costa Rica U-23. The team will play two friendly matches against Costa Rica First Division teams in preparation for the 2020 CONCACAF Men's Olympic Qualifying Championship.

On December 9, Portland announced they would re-sign Edgar "RCTID_Thiago" Guerrer for the 2020 eMLS season. This marks his third year with the club, participating in all eMLS competitions since its inauguration in 2018.

On December 10, forward Jeremy Ebobisse underwent a minor procedure to repair a meniscus tear that was sustained last month while on duty with the U.S. U-23 Men's National Team. He is expected to return to action in time for the start of preseason.

On December 16, Portland announced the multiyear contract extension for Argentine midfielder, Diego Valeri. He was signed using Targeted Allocation Money (TAM) and will no longer use a Designated Player (DP) slot.

On December 19, MLS reviled the full MLS season schedule. Later that day, Portland announced the contract extension of Bill Tuiloma.

On December 20, Portland goalkeeper Steve Clark signed a new contract with the club.

On January 2, Portland announced the signing of Colombian right winger, Yimmi Chará. He will occupy a Designated Player and International Roster Slot. He is the younger brother of center defensive midfielder, Diego Chará.

On January 9, Portland selected Irish midfielder, Aaron Molloy from Penn State as the 16th overall 2020 MLS Super Draft pick. Portland traded their second round pick to D.C. United on January 23, 2019. Later that day, Edgar "RCTID_Thiago" Guerrero finished in 12th place out of the 25 single team table. He was unable to qualify for the playoffs. His 2020 eMLS League Series One record was 4-5-3 (15 points).

On January 13, Portland selected American defender, Zachery McGraw from Army as the 68th overall 2020 MLS Super Draft pick. Shortly after, Portland selected Norwegian defender, Joergen Oland from Fordham. He was the 94th overall pick for the 2020 MLS Super Draft.

=== Preseason ===
On January 20, players reported for their first day of training for the upcoming 2020 MLS campaign.

On January 21, Portland announced the details of their Costa Rica preseason travel. Portland will face Saprissa on Saturday, February 1, Municipal Grecia on Wednesday, February 5, and C.S. Herediano on Sunday, February 9.

On January 22, Portland midfielder Andrés Flores underwent surgery to repair medial meniscus tear. He is expected to return in 4 to 6 weeks.

On January 23, Portland signed midfielder Blake Bodily as a Homegrown Player for the 2020 season.

On January 30, Portland signed Polish striker Jarosław Niezgoda from Polish Ekstraklasa side Legia Warsaw. He will occupy a Designated Player and International Roster Slot.

On January 31, Portland signed Chilean striker Felipe Mora on loan for one year from Liga MX side Pumas UNAM. He will occupy an International Roster Slot.

On February 1, Portland defeated Saprissa 2–1 in Costa Rica. Goals were scored by Diego Valeri in the 9th minute and Timbers 2 newcomer, Ken Krolicki in the 77th minute.

On February 5, Portland defeated Municipal Grecia 3–1 in Costa Rica. Felipe Mora (assisted by: Sebastián Blanco) scored in the 17th minute while Eryk Williamson captured a brace with goals in the 59th and 65th minute. Later that day, Portland released their 2020–21 secondary kit.

On February 6, Portland announced the completed transfer of Cristhian Paredes who was on loan to the Timbers from Liga MX side, Club América.

On February 9, Portland defeated Herediano 3–0 in Costa Rica in four 30 minute sessions. Goals were scored by Felipe Mora (assisted by: Diego Valeri and Sebastián Blanco) in the 58th minute, Dairon Asprilla (assisted by: Renzo Zambrano) in the 103rd minute, and an own goal in the 118th minute by an unnamed player. This finishes Portland's preseason campaign in Costa Rica.

On February 11, Portland received $150,000 in General Allocation Money (GAM) from the Montreal Impact in exchange for a 2020 international roster slot.

On February 16, Portland started their 2020 home preseason tournament with a victory against Vancouver Whitecaps FC. The final score was 2–1 with goals scored by Diego Valeri (penalty kick) in the 34th minute and Andy Polo (assisted by: Diego Valeri) in the 46th minute.

On February 19, Portland was defeated by Minnesota United FC with a final score of 2–4. Goals for Portland were scored by Dairon Asprilla (assisted by: Tomás Conechny) in the 29th minute and Ken Krolicki in the 85th minute. Ken Krolicki plays for Timbers 2.

On February 22, Portland finished their final home and preseason match with a defeat against New England Revolution with a final score of 1–3. The lone scorer was Diego Chará in the 29th minute. During the same day, Portland acquired $165,000 in General Allocation Money from Vancouver Whitecaps FC in exchange for a 2020 international roster slot.

On February 25, Portland signed right back Chris Duvall.

On February 26, Portland announced that they signed forward, Jeremy Ebobisse to a multi-year contract extension.

=== February ===
On February 29, the 2020 MLS Season officially began.

=== March ===
On March 1, Portland began their 2020 MLS campaign by hosting Minnesota United FC. The Timbers Army raised their "Legends of Goose Hollow" tifo. Portland lost with a final score of 1–3 with Diego Valeri successfully converting a penalty in the 56th minute.

On March 7, Taylor Twellman reported Portland right-back Jorge Moreira sustained a leg injury that will likely require surgery.

On March 8, Portland captured their first victory of the season by defeating Nashville SC with a final score of 1–0. The lone scorer was Diego Valeri (assisted by: Andy Polo) in the 12th minute. Steve Clark captured his first clean sheet of the season.

On March 9, Portland forward Jeremy Ebobisse was selected on the United States Under-23 national team roster for 2020 Olympic qualifying which will take place in Guadalajara, Mexico from March 20 – April 1. Dario Župarić and Steve Clark were awarded a spot on MLS Team of the Week: Week 2.

On March 12, Major League Soccer announced a 30-day suspension of the league in wake of the COVID-19 pandemic.

On March 19, Major League Soccer extended the league suspension until at least May 19, 2020 in accordance with CDC guidance on COVID-19.

=== April ===
On April 17, Major League Soccer further extended the league suspension due to COVID-19 until at least June 8, 2020.

=== May ===
On May 1, Major League Soccer announced that players are cleared to start voluntary individual workouts beginning on May 6.

On May 19, Major League Soccer announced the cancellation of the MLS All-Star Game, Leagues Cup, and Campeones Cup for 2020 due to the COVID-19 pandemic. Due to this decision, Portland will not take part in the Leagues Cup this year.

On May 20, midfielder Dairon Asprilla undergoes successful arthroscopic meniscus repair procedure. He is expected to be out for five to six months.

On May 30, Major League Soccer announced that clubs can begin voluntary small group training sessions.

=== June ===
On June 4, Major League Soccer announced that clubs can return to full team training.

On June 10, Major League Soccer announced the start of play again, starting with a World Cup style tournament with wins that will count toward the regular season, which will begin after the tournament.

On June 11, Portland was drawn into Group F of the MLS is Back tournament, along with Los Angeles FC, LA Galaxy, and Houston Dynamo.

On June 18, Portland declined a permanent transfer option included in the loan agreement on right-back Jorge Moreira. He will return to Superliga Argentina side River Plate as his loan is now over. Shortly after, Portland announced the signing of Venezuelan right back Pablo Bonilla from its USL Championship affiliate Portland Timbers 2.

On June 22, Portland signed defender Zac McGraw who was selected by the Timbers as the 68th overall 2020 SuperDraft pick earlier this year.

On June 28, Edgar "RCTID Thiago" Guerrero, Portland Timbers' eMLS competitor, lost a 2-1 battle to the LA Galaxy's Giuseppe "Godfather" Guastella Sunday in the Knockout Round of the 2020 eMLS Cup.

=== July ===
On July 6, Major League Soccer announced the revised 2020 transfer windows due to the impact of COVID-19. A two-day transfer window from July 6 through July 7 and a secondary transfer window from August 12 – October 29.

On July 8, the MLS is Back Tournament officially began.

On July 9, Portland acquired a later MLS SuperDraft pick from Real Salt Lake in exchange for Portland Timber 2 forward Ryan Sierakowski. The draft pick is Real Salt Lake's 2023 fourth-round selection unless Sierakowski signs an MLS contract with Real Salt Lake. In that case, the pick is conveyed as Real Salt Lake's second-round pick in the subsequent season of his signing.

On July 13, Portland defeated LA Galaxy 2–1. The goal scorers were Jeremy Ebobisse in the 59th minute (assisted by: Sebastián Blanco and Diego Valeri) and Sebastián Blanco in the 66th minute. This puts Portland first in Group F at the end of the first round.

On July 18, Portland defeated Houston Dynamo with a final score of 2–1. The goal scorers were Jeremy Ebobisse (assisted by: Sebastián Blanco) in the 35th minute and Diego Valeri (assisted by: Eryk Williamson and Larrys Mabiala) in the 61st minute. With this win, Portland is guaranteed to advance to the Round of 16.

On July 23, Portland drew Los Angeles FC to a final result of 2–2. The goal scorers were Jarosław Niezgoda (assisted by: Sebastián Blanco and Marvin Loría) in the 7th minute. This marks his first goal for the club and MLS. The final goal was scored by Jeremy Ebobisse (assisted by: Bill Tuiloma) in the 81st minute. With LA Galaxy and Houston Dynamo also ending with a draw, Portland claims first place in Group F and will face Group E second place club FC Cincinnati on July 28.

On July 28, Portland drew with FC Cincinnati 1–1. Portland won 4–2 on penalties. The lone goalscorer was Jaroslaw Niezgoda (assisted by: Sebastián Blanco) in the 67th minute. Portland will face New York City FC in the quarterfinals on August 1.

=== August ===
On August 1, Portland defeated New York City FC in the quarterfinals 3–1. The goal scorers are Sebastián Blanco in the 43rd minute, Diego Valeri (assisted by: Jaroslaw Niezgoda) in the 65th minute, and Andy Polo (assisted by: Sebastián Blanco) in the 76th minute. Portland now advance to the semi-finals where they take on Philadelphia Union on August 5. This match also marks the 300th appearance for defensive midfielder, Diego Chará; Portland's longest signed player since signing with the club at the start of MLS play in 2011.

On August 5, Portland defeated Philadelphia Union in the semifinals 2–1. The goal scorers are Jeremy Ebobisse (assisted by: Diego Valeri) in the 13th minute and Sebastián Blanco (assisted by: Dario Župarić and Dario Župarić) in the 70th minute. Portland advances to the final to play Orlando City SC on August 11.

On August 8, Major League Soccer announced the first re-opening league schedules for all clubs.

On August 11, Portland won the MLS is Back Tournament with a final score of 2–1. The goal scorers were Larrys Mabiala (assisted by: Diego Valeri) in the 27th minute and Dario Župarić (assisted by: Jeremy Ebobisse, Eryk Williamson) in the 66th minute. With this win, Portland secures a berth in the 2021 CONCACAF Champions League.

On August 13, Sebastián Blanco was awarded Player of the Tournament for MLS is Back Tournament. He took home 40.86 percent of the weighted media and fan vote, narrowly edging out Orlando City captain Nani's 37.54 percent. Later that day, Major League Soccer announced the tournament's Best XI. Included in the XI were Portland's Jeremy Ebobisse, Sebastián Blanco, Larrys Mabiala, and Diego Chará.

On August 14, goalkeeper Steve Clark won MLS is Back Tournament's Save of the Tournament while midfielder Andy Polo won MLS is Back Tournament's Goal of the Tournament. U.S. Soccer announced the official cancellation of the 2020 U.S. Open Cup.

On August 23, Portland resumed regular season play against rival Seattle Sounders FC. Portland was defeated with a final score of 0–3.

On August 29, Portland drew Real Salt Lake at home with a final score of 4–4. The goal scorers were Diego Chará in the 6th minute. Jarosław Niezgoda (assisted by: Diego Valeri) in the 21st minute. Sebastián Blanco (assisted by: Jeremy Ebobisse) in the 70th minute. Felipe Mora (assisted by: Sebastián Blanco) in the 85th minute.

=== September ===
On September 2, Portland lost at home to LA Galaxy with a final score of 2–3. The goal scorers were Felipe Mora in the 67th minute and Diego Valeri (assisted by: Yimmi Chará, Sebastián Blanco) in the 90th +2

On September 6, Portland defeated Seattle Sounders FC at CenturyLink Field with a final score of 2–1. The goal scorers were Eryk Williamson (assisted by: Diego Valeri) in the 9th minute and Felipe Mora (assisted by: Eryk Williamson) in the 83rd minute.

On September 8, Portland announced that Sebastián Blanco will miss the remainder of the season due to torn ACL.

On September 11, Portland announced more matches for the month of September.

On September 13 Portland lost on the road to Los Angeles FC with a final score of 4–2. The goal scorers were Eryk Williamson (assisted by: Felipe Mora and Diego Valeri) in the 25th minute and Jeremy Ebobisse (assisted by: Jorge Villafaña) in the 45+2 minute.

On September 16, Portland drew San Jose Earthquakes away with a final score of 1–1. The lone goal scorer was Yimmi Chará (assisted by: Diego Chará) in the 33rd minute. This is the first time in club history that brothers were able to do an assist and a goal.

On September 19, Portland secured a dominated win over San Jose Earthquakes away with a final score of 6–1. The goal scorers were Diego Valeri (penalty kick) in the 25th minute. Jeremy Ebobisse (assisted by: Jorge Villafaña) in the 27th minute. Diego Valeri (assisted by: Diego Chará) in the 57th minute. Yimmi Chará in the 70th minute. Julio Cascante (assisted by: Diego Valeri) in the 85th minute. Finally, Jaroslaw Niezgoda (assisted by: Diego Chará) in the 87th minute.

On September 21, Diego Valeri was named Player of the Week for Week 12.

On September 22, Major League Soccer reviled the remaining matches for all teams for the 2020 season.

On September 23, Portland defeated their rival, Seattle Sounders FC to a final score of 2–1 at home. The lone goalscorer was Yimmi Chará (assisted by: Jeremy Ebobisse) in the 13th minute.

On September 27, Portland played Vancouver Whitecaps at Providence Park but due to the border issues caused by COVID-19, Portland acted as the away team. Portland won with a final score of 1–0 with the lone goal scorer being Felipe Mora (assisted by: Eryk Williamson) in the 5th minute.

=== October ===
On October 3, Portland's match against Colorado Rapids was suspended due to Colorado players and staff reporting cases of COVID-19.

== Team kits ==
Supplier: Adidas / Sponsor: Alaska Air

Primary	Secondary

== Coaching staff and front office ==
=== Executive staff ===
Position	Staff
Chief executive officer	Merritt Paulson
President of business	Mike Golub
GM and president of soccer	Gavin Wilkinson
Sr. VP, operations	Ken Puckett
Sr. VP, ticket sales and services	Joe Cote
Sr. VP, business operations and marketing	Cory Dolich
Sr. VP, corporate partnerships	Todd Spear
VP, communications	Chris Metz
VP, broadcasting	Matt Smith
VP, guest services and event sales	Ashley Highsmith
VP, community impact	Kristel Wissel
VP, finance	Jessica Guenther

Last updated: March 19, 2019

=== Coaching staff ===
Position	Staff
Head coach	Giovanni Savarese
Assistant coach	Miles Joseph
Assistant coach	Carlos Llamosa
Goalkeeping coach	Guillermo Valencia
Video/data analyst	Shannon Murray
Head athletic trainer	Jon MacGregor, ATC
Athletic trainer	Taichi Kitagawa, ATC
Athletic trainer	Alex Margarito, ATC
Director, sports science	Nick Milanos
Performance specialist	Charles Burdick
Performance physical therapist	Matthew Weston

Last updated: January 24, 2019
Source: Portland Timbers

=== Stadiums ===
Ground (capacity and dimensions)	Providence Park (25,218 / 110x75 yards)
Training ground	Adidas Training Facility

Source: Providence Park

== Squad information ==
=== First team ===
As of July 6, 2020

No.	Name	Nat	Positions	Since	Date of birth (age)	Signed from	Games	Goals
Goalkeepers
1	Jeff Attinella	(United States)	GK	2017	September 29, 1988 (age 37)	(United States) Minnesota United FC	54	0
12	Steve Clark	(United States)	GK	2018	April 29, 1986 (age 40)	free transfer	33	0
31	Aljaž Ivačič	(Slovenia)	GK	2019	December 29, 1993 (age 32)	(Slovenia) NK Olimpija Ljubljana	0	0
Defenders
4	Jorge Villafaña	(United States)	LB	2018	September 16, 1989 (age 37)	(Mexico) Santos Laguna	96	2
13	Dario Župarić (INT)	(Croatia)	CB	2019	May 3, 1992 (age 34)	(Croatia) HNK Rijeka	0	0
15	Chris Duvall	(United States)	RB	2020	September 10, 1991 (age 35)	free transfer	0	0
18	Julio Cascante	(Costa Rica)	CB	2018	October 3, 1993 (age 32)	(Costa Rica) Deportivo Saprissa	43	0
25	Bill Tuiloma	(New Zealand)	DF / CDM / CB	2017	March 27, 1995 (age 31)	free transfer	43	2
28	Pablo Bonilla (INT)	(Venezuela)	RB	2020	December 2, 1999 (age 26)	(United States) Portland Timbers 2	0	0
32	Marco Farfan (HG)	(United States)	LB	2017	November 12, 1998 (age 27)	(United States) Portland Timbers 2	20	0
50	Larrys Mabiala	(Democratic Republic of the Congo)	CB	2017	October 8, 1987 (age 38)	(Turkey) Kayserispor	72	7
85	Zac McGraw	(United States)	DF	2020	June 8, 1997 (age 29)	(United States) 2020 MLS SuperDraft	0	0
Midfielders
8	Diego Valeri	(Argentina)	MF	2013	March 15, 1988 (age 38)	(Argentina) Lanús	229	82
10	Sebastián Blanco (DP)	(Argentina)	MF / FW	2017	March 5, 1990 (age 36)	(Argentina) San Lorenzo	102	27
14	Andrés Flores	(El Salvador)	CDM	2018	August 31, 1990 (age 36)	free transfer	42	1
19	Tomás Conechny	(Argentina)	MF	2018	March 30, 1998 (age 28)	(Argentina) San Lorenzo	20	1
21	Diego Chara	(Colombia)	CDM	2011	April 5, 1986 (age 40)	(Colombia) Deportes Tolima	278	10
22	Cristhian Paredes (INT)	(Paraguay)	CDM	2018	May 18, 1998 (age 28)	(Mexico) América	0 (42 on Loan)	0 (5 on Loan)
23	Yimmi Chará (DP) (INT)	(Colombia)	RW / LW	2020	April 2, 1991 (age 35)	(Brazil) Atlético Mineiro	0	0
30	Eryk Williamson (HG)	(United States)	MF	2018	June 11, 1997 (age 29)	(United States) D.C. United	7	0
40	Renzo Zambrano (INT)	(Venezuela)	MF	2018	August 26, 1994 (age 32)	(United States) Portland Timbers 2	10	0
98	Blake Bodily (HG)	(United States)	MF	2020	January 13, 1998 (age 28)	(United States) Timbers Academy	0	0
Forwards
7	Andy Polo (INT)	(Peru)	ST / W	2018	September 29, 1994 (age 31)	(Mexico) Morelia	24 (24 on Loan)	0 (1 on Loan)
9	Felipe Mora (L) (INT)	(Chile)	ST	2020	March 15, 1995 (age 31)	(Mexico) UNAM	0	0
11	Jarosław Niezgoda (DP) (INT)	(Poland)	ST	2020	March 15, 1995 (age 31)	(Poland) Legia Warsaw	0	0
17	Jeremy Ebobisse	(United States)	ST	2017	February 14, 1997 (age 29)	(United States) 2017 MLS SuperDraft	66	15
27	Dairon Asprilla	(Colombia)	RW / LW / FW	2015	May 25, 1992 (age 34)	(Colombia) Atlético Nacional	106	11
44	Marvin Loría (INT)	(Costa Rica)	FW	2018	April 24, 1997 (age 29)	(United States) Portland Timbers 2	19	2

- (HG) = Homegrown Player
- (GA) = Generation Adidas Player
- (DP) = Designated Player
- (INT) = Player using International Roster Slot
- (L) = On Loan to the Timbers
- (LO) = Loaned out to another club
- (SEIL) = Season-ending Injury List

=== eMLS team ===
As of December 9, 2019

Name	Nat	Since	Gamer tag
Players
Edgar Guerrero	United States	2018	RCTID_Thiago

== Competitions ==
=== Competitions overview ===
Competition	Record								Start round	First match	Last match	Final position (Conference)
Competition	G	W	D	L	GF	GA	GD	Win %				
MLS is Back Tournament	7	5	2	0	14	8	+6	71.43	Group Stage	July 13, 2020	August 11, 2020	Winners
Major League Soccer	12	6	2	4	27	23	+4	50.00	1	March 1, 2020	November 8, 2020	TBD (TBD Western)
MLS Cup Playoffs	0	0	0	0	0	0	+0	—	TBD	TBD	TBD	TBD
U.S. Open Cup	0	0	0	0	0	0	+0	—	Cancelled	N/A	N/A	N/A
Leagues Cup	0	0	0	0	0	0	+0	—	Cancelled	N/A	N/A	N/A
Total	19	11	4	4	41	31	+10	57.89				

Updated to match played October 8, 2020
Source: Competitions

=== Major League Soccer ===
==== Preseason ====
===== Costa Rica =====
Win Draw Loss Upcoming fixture

February 1, 2020 1	Saprissa	1–2	Portland Timbers	San José, Costa Rica
8:40 PST	65'	Report; Report	Valeri 9'; Krolicki 77'	Stadium: Estadio Ricardo Saprissa Aymá; Attendance: Closed match

February 5, 2020 2	Municipal Grecia	1–3	Portland Timbers	San Rafael, Costa Rica
8:30 PST	24'	Report; Report	Mora 17' (Blanco); Williamson 59', 65'	Stadium: Complejo Deportivo Fedefutbol Plycem; Attendance: Closed match

February 9, 2020 3	Herediano	0–3	Portland Timbers	San Rafael, Costa Rica
8:00 PST		Report; Report	Mora 58' (Blanco); Asprilla 103' (Zambrano); 118' (o.g.)	Stadium: Complejo Deportivo Fedefutbol Plycem; Attendance: Closed match
Note: Played in four 30-minute periods.

===== Portland tournament =====
Win Draw Loss Upcoming fixture

February 16, 2020 1	Portland Timbers	2–1	Vancouver Whitecaps FC	Portland, Oregon
17:00 PST	Valeri 34' (pen.); Polo 46' (Valeri)	Report	Cavallini 39' (Adnan)	Stadium: Providence Park; Attendance: 13,882

February 19, 2020 2	Portland Timbers	2–4	Minnesota United FC	Portland, Oregon
19:30 PST	Asprilla 29'; Krolicki 85'	Report	Edwards 35', 54'; Chacón 63'; Amarilla 74'	Stadium: Providence Park

February 22, 2020 3	Portland Timbers	1–3	New England Revolution	Portland, Oregon
17:00 PST	D. Chará 29'	Report	Bou 42' (Bye), 45+' (pen.); Buksa 51' (Bou)	Stadium: Providence Park; Attendance: 13,920

====== Standings ======
Pos	Team	GP	W	L	D	GF	GA	GD	Pts
1	Vancouver Whitecaps FC	3	2	1	0	5	3	+2	6
2	Minnesota United FC	3	1	1	1	7	6	+1	4
3	New England Revolution	3	1	1	1	5	5	0	4
4	Portland Timbers	3	1	2	0	5	8	−3	3

Last updated: February 23, 2020.
Source: Preseason

==== MLS is Back Tournament ====
===== Group F matches =====
Note: Group matches will count as points towards the regular season.

Win Draw Loss Upcoming fixture

July 13, 2020 1	LA Galaxy	1–2	Portland Timbers	Orlando, Florida
19:30 PST	Chicharito (penalty missed) 12',	Report	Župarić (yellow card) 11' (yellow-red card) 75'; Ebobisse; Blanco 66'; D. Chara (yellow card) 90+5'	Stadium: ESPN Wide World of Sports Complex; Attendance: closed match Referee: Ramy Touchan

July 18, 2020 2	Portland Timbers	2–1	Houston Dynamo	Orlando, Florida
17:00 PST	Williamson (yellow card) 24'; Ebobisse 35' (Blanco); Valeri; Villafaña (yellow card) 86'	Report	Figueroa (yellow card) 7'; Rodríguez (yellow card) 45+1'; Elis 86' (pen.), (yellow card) 87' (yellow-red card) 88'	Stadium: ESPN Wide World of Sports Complex; Attendance: closed match Referee: Ismail Elfath

July 23, 2020 3	Los Angeles FC	2–2	Portland Timbers	Orlando, Florida
19:30 PST	Niezgoda; Duvall (yellow card) 29'; Blanco (yellow card) 54'; Paredes (yellow card) 65'; Ebobisse 81' (Tuiloma)	Report	Wright-Phillips 36' (Blessing); Kaye 40' (Rodríguez); Atuesta (yellow card) 60'	Stadium: ESPN Wide World of Sports Complex; Attendance: closed match Referee: Drew Fischer

===== Group F standings =====
Group F results
Pos	Team	Pld	W	D	L	GF	GA	GD	Pts	Qualification
1	Portland Timbers	3	2	1	0	6	4	+2	7	Advanced to knockout stage
2	Los Angeles FC	3	1	2	0	11	7	+4	5	Advanced to knockout stage
3	Houston Dynamo	3	0	2	1	5	6	−1	2	
4	LA Galaxy	3	0	1	2	4	9	−5	1	

Source: MLS
Rules for classification: Group stage tiebreakers

===== Knockout stage =====
July 28, 2020 Round of 16	Portland Timbers	1–1 (4–2 p)	FC Cincinnati	Orlando, Florida
19:30 PST	Blanco (yellow card) 18'; Villafaña (yellow card) 29'; Niezgoda 67' (Blanco)	Report	(yellow card) 30' Gutman: (yellow card) 46' Gyau; 81' (pen.) Locadia; (yellow card) 90' Alashe	Stadium: ESPN Wide World of Sports Complex; Attendance: closed match Referee: Armando Villarreal
	Penalties
	Valeri (penalty scored); Mora (penalty scored); Blanco (penalty scored); Niezgoda (penalty scored)		(penalty scored) De Jong; (penalty scored) Cruz; (penalty missed) Locadia; (penalty missed) Waston

August 1, 2020 Quarter-finals	New York City FC	1–3	Portland Timbers	Orlando, Florida
19:30 PST	Medina 27' (pen.)	Report	Blanco 43'; Valeri 65' (Niezgoda); Polo 76' (Blanco)	Stadium: ESPN Wide World of Sports Complex; Attendance: closed match Referee: Allen Chapman

August 5, 2020 Semi-finals	Philadelphia Union	1–2	Portland Timbers	Orlando, Florida
17:00 PST	Wooten 85'	Report	Ebobisse 13' (Valeri); Blanco	Stadium: ESPN Wide World of Sports Complex; Attendance: closed match Referee: Allen Chapman

August 11, 2020 Final	Portland Timbers	2–1	Orlando City SC	Orlando, Florida
17:00 PST	Mabiala 27' (Valeri), (yellow card) 44'; Župarić; D. Chará (yellow card) 70'; Villafaña (yellow card) 73'	Report	Pereyra 39'; Carlos (yellow card) 47'; Moutinho (yellow card) 63'; Nani (yellow card) 73'; Ruan (yellow card) 85'	Stadium: ESPN Wide World of Sports Complex; Attendance: closed match Referee: Ismail Elfath

==== MLS regular season ====
Pos	Team	Pld	W	L	T	GF	GA	GD	Pts	PPG	Qualification
1	Sporting Kansas City	21	12	6	3	38	25	+13	39	1.86	Qualification for the playoffs first round and Leagues Cup
2	Seattle Sounders FC	22	11	5	6	44	23	+21	39	1.77	Qualification for the playoffs first round and Leagues Cup
3	Portland Timbers	23	11	6	6	46	35	+11	39	1.70	Qualification for the playoffs first round and 2021 CONCACAF Champions League (Note: As MLS is Back Tournament winners)
4	Minnesota United FC	21	9	5	7	36	26	+10	34	1.62	Qualification for the playoffs first round
5	Colorado Rapids	18	8	6	4	32	28	+4	28	1.56	Qualification for the playoffs first round

Source: MLS
Rules for classification: 1) points per game; 2) total wins per match played; 3) total goal differential per match played; 4) total goals scored per match played; 5) fewest disciplinary points per match played; 6) away goal differential per away match played; 7) away goals scored per away match played; 8) home goal differential per home match played; 9) home goals scored per home match played; 10) coin toss or drawing of lots.
Notes:

2020 MLS overall standings
Pos	Team	Pld	W	L	T	GF	GA	GD	Pts	PPG	Qualification
6	Seattle Sounders FC	22	11	5	6	44	23	+21	39	1.77	2021 Leagues Cup (Note: As 2nd, Western Conference (MLS3))
7	New York City FC	23	12	8	3	37	25	+12	39	1.70	2021 Leagues Cup (Note: As 5th, Eastern Conference (MLS4))
8	Portland Timbers (M)	23	11	6	6	46	35	+11	39	1.70	2021 CONCACAF Champions League (Note: As MLS is Back Tournament winners (USA3))
9	Minnesota United FC	21	9	5	7	36	26	+10	34	1.62	
10	Colorado Rapids	18	8	6	4	32	28	+4	28	1.56	

Source: MLS
Rules for classification: 1) points per game; 2) total wins per match played; 3) total goal differential per match played; 4) total goals scored per match played; 5) fewest disciplinary points per match played; 6) away goal differential per away match played; 7) away goals scored per away match played; 8) home goal differential per home match played; 9) home goals scored per home match played; 10) coin toss or drawing of lots.
(M) MLS is Back Tournament champions

===== Matches =====
Win Draw Loss Upcoming fixture

March 1, 2020 1	Portland Timbers	1–3	Minnesota United FC	Portland, Oregon
16:30 PST	Paredes (yellow card) 43'; Valeri 56' (pen.), (yellow card) 61'; D. Chará (yellow card) 71'	Report	Alonso (yellow card) 31'; Métanire (yellow card) 38'; Molino 51', 78' (Finlay); Amarilla 76' (Finlay)	Stadium: Providence Park; Attendance: 25,218; Referee: Ismail Elfath

March 8, 2020 2	Portland Timbers	1–0	Nashville SC	Portland, Oregon
16:00 PST	Larrys Mabiala (yellow card) 5'; Valeri 12' (Polo); D. Chará (yellow card) 84'; Duvall (yellow card) 90+2'	Report	Lovitz (yellow card) 29'	Stadium: Providence Park; Attendance: 25,218; Referee: Armando Villarreal

3	New England Revolution	P–P	Portland Timbers	Foxborough, Massachusetts
				Stadium: Gillette Stadium

4	Los Angeles FC	P–P	Portland Timbers	Los Angeles, California
				Stadium: Banc of California Stadium

5	Portland Timbers	P–P	Philadelphia Union	Portland, Oregon
				Stadium: Providence Park

6	Houston Dynamo	P–P	Portland Timbers	Houston, Texas
				Stadium: BBVA Stadium

7	Portland Timbers	P–P	FC Dallas	Portland, Oregon
				Stadium: Providence Park

8	Atlanta United FC	P–P	Portland Timbers	Atlanta, Georgia
13:30 PST				Stadium: Mercedes-Benz Stadium

9 (Cascadia Cup)	Portland Timbers	P–P	Vancouver Whitecaps FC	Portland, Oregon
19:00 PST				Stadium: Providence Park

10	Portland Timbers	P–P	LA Galaxy	Portland, Oregon
12:30 PST				Stadium: Providence Park

11	Real Salt Lake	P–P	Portland Timbers	Sandy, Utah
19:00 PST				Stadium: Rio Tinto Stadium

12 (Cascadia Cup)	Portland Timbers	P–P	Seattle Sounders FC	Portland, Oregon
14:00 PST				Stadium: Providence Park

13	Minnesota United FC	P–P	Portland Timbers	Saint Paul, Minnesota
17:00 PST				Stadium: Allianz Field

14	Chicago Fire FC	P–P	Portland Timbers	Chicago, Illinois
17:00 PST				Stadium: Soldier Field

15	Orlando City SC	P–P	Portland Timbers	Orlando, Florida
16:30 PST				Stadium: Exploria Stadium

16	Portland Timbers	P–P	Sporting Kansas City	Portland, Oregon
14:00 PST				Stadium: Providence Park

17	Portland Timbers	P–P	Colorado Rapids	Portland, Oregon
19:30 PST				Stadium: Providence Park

18	New York Red Bulls	P–P	Portland Timbers	Harrison, New Jersey
14:00 PST				Stadium: Red Bull Arena

19	Sporting Kansas City	P–P	Portland Timbers	Kansas City, Kansas
15:30 PST				Stadium: Children's Mercy Park

20	Portland Timbers	P–P	Columbus Crew SC	Portland, Oregon
19:30 PST				Stadium: Providence Park

21	Nashville SC	P–P	Portland Timbers	Nashville, Tennessee
16:00 PST				Stadium: Nissan Stadium

22	Colorado Rapids	P–P	Portland Timbers	Commerce City, Colorado
18:00 PST				Stadium: Dick's Sporting Goods Park

23	Portland Timbers	P–P	San Jose Earthquakes	Portland, Oregon
19:30 PST				Stadium: Providence Park

24	Portland Timbers	P–P	Houston Dynamo	Portland, Oregon
19:30 PST				Stadium: Providence Park

25	LA Galaxy	P–P	Portland Timbers	Carson, California
19:00 PST				Stadium: Dignity Health Sports Park

26	Portland Timbers	P–P	FC Cincinnati	Portland, Oregon
19:30 PST				Stadium: Providence Park

July 13, 2020 (27) MiBT Group match 1	LA Galaxy	1–2	Portland Timbers	Orlando, Florida
19:30 PST	Chicharito (penalty missed) 12',	Report	Župarić (yellow card) 11' (yellow-red card) 75'; Ebobisse; Blanco 66'; D. Chara (yellow card) 90+5'	Stadium: ESPN Wide World of Sports Complex; Attendance: closed match Referee: Ramy Touchan

July 18, 2020 (28) MiBT Group match 2	Portland Timbers	2–1	Houston Dynamo	Orlando, Florida
17:00 PST	Williamson (yellow card) 24'; Ebobisse 35' (Blanco); Valeri; Villafaña (yellow card) 86'	Report	Figueroa (yellow card) 7'; Rodríguez (yellow card) 45+1'; Elis 86' (pen.), (yellow card) 87' (yellow-red card) 88'	Stadium: ESPN Wide World of Sports Complex; Attendance: closed match Referee: Ismail Elfath

July 23, 2020 (29) MiBT Group match 3	Los Angeles FC	2–2	Portland Timbers	Orlando, Florida
19:30 PST	Niezgoda; Duvall (yellow card) 29'; Blanco (yellow card) 54'; Paredes (yellow card) 65'; Ebobisse 81' (Tuiloma)	Report	Wright-Phillips 36' (Blessing); Kaye 40' (Rodríguez); Atuesta (yellow card) 60'	Stadium: ESPN Wide World of Sports Complex; Attendance: closed match Referee: Drew Fischer

30	Portland Timbers	P–P	Inter Miami FC	Portland, Oregon
19:30 PST				Stadium: Providence Park

31 (Cascadia Cup)	Seattle Sounders FC	P–P	Portland Timbers	Seattle, Washington
13:00 PST				Stadium: Century Link Field

32	Portland Timbers	P–P	Los Angeles FC	Portland, Oregon
18:00 PST				Stadium: Providence Park

33	FC Dallas	P–P	Portland Timbers	Frisco, Texas
17:30 PST				Stadium: Toyota Stadium

34	San Jose Earthquakes	P–P	Portland Timbers	San Jose, California
19:00 PST				Stadium: Avaya Stadium

35	Portland Timbers	P–P	Toronto FC	Portland, Oregon
18:00 PST				Stadium: Providence Park

36	Portland Timbers	P–P	Real Salt Lake	Portland, Oregon
19:30 PST				Stadium: Providence Park

37 (Cascadia Cup)	Vancouver Whitecaps FC	P–P	Portland Timbers	Vancouver, British Columbia, Canada
13:30 PST				Stadium: BC Place

August 23, 2020 38	Portland Timbers	0–3	Seattle Sounders FC	Portland, Oregon
19:00 PST		Report	Ruidíaz, 83'; Leerdam	Stadium: Providence Park; Referee: Jair Marrufo

August 26, 2020 39	San Jose Earthquakes	P–P	Portland Timbers	San Jose, California
19:30 PST				Stadium: Avaya Stadium
Note: Match postponed.

August 29, 2020 40	Portland Timbers	4–4	Real Salt Lake	Portland, Oregon
19:30 PST	D. Chara 6', (yellow card) 30'; Niezgoda 21' (Valeri); Mabiala (yellow card) 67'; Williamson (yellow card) 69'; Blanco 70' (Ebobisse); Mora 85' (Blanco)	Report	Baird 19'; Kreilach 48'; Rossi; Johnson (yellow card) 81', (goal) 90+4' (Baird)	Stadium: Providence Park; Referee: Ismail Elfath

September 2, 2020 41	Portland Timbers	2–3	LA Galaxy	Portland, Oregon
19:30 PST	Bonilla (yellow card) 12'; Zambrano (yellow card) 48'; Mora 67'; Valeri	Report	Álvarez 15' (Lletget); Pavón 50' (DePuy); Araujo (yellow card) 63'; Corona 71'	Stadium: Providence Park; Referee: Joseph Dickerson

September 6, 2020 42	Seattle Sounders FC	1–2	Portland Timbers	Seattle, Washington
19:00 (PDT)	Leerdam 42'; Roldan (yellow card) 45+4'; Bruin (yellow card) 76'	Report	Williamson 9' (Valeri), (yellow card) 90'; Villafaña (yellow card) 49'; Duvall (yellow card) 79'; Mora 83' (Williamson); D. Chará (yellow card) 86'	Stadium: Century Link Field; Referee: Ismail Elfath

September 13, 2020 43	Los Angeles FC	4–2	Portland Timbers	Los Angeles, California
19:00 PST	Kaye; Rossi 41' (Rodríguez); Wright-Phillips 45+1' (Ginella); Musovski 90+5' (Kaye); Cifuentes (yellow card) 83'	Report	Williamson; Ebobisse 45+2' (Villafaña); Bonilla (yellow card) 71'	Stadium: Banc of California Stadium; Referee: Jair Marrufo

September 16, 2020 44	San Jose Earthquakes	1–1	Portland Timbers	San Jose, California
18:30 PST	Jungwirth (yellow card) 30'; Qazaishvili 76' (Wondolowski); Yueill (yellow card) 90+1'	Report	Y. Chará 33' (D. Chará); Zuparic (yellow card) 84'; Paredes (yellow card) 85'	Stadium: Avaya Stadium; Attendance: 0 Referee: Alex Chilowicz
Note: Round 39 match after being postponed.

September 19, 2020 45	San Jose Earthquakes	1–6	Portland Timbers	San Jose, California
19:30 PST	Lima (yellow card) 14'; Fierro; Jungwirth (yellow card) 49'	Report	Valeri 25' (pen.), 57' (D. Chará); Conechny (yellow card) 29'; Ebobisse 27' (Villafaña); Y. Chará 70'; Cascante 85' (Valeri); Niezgoda 87' (D. Chará)	Stadium: Avaya Stadium; Referee: Rosendo Mendoza

September 23, 2020 46	Portland Timbers	1–0	Seattle Sounders FC	Portland, Oregon
19:00 PST	Y. Chará 13'; Bonilla (yellow card) 55'; Williamson (yellow card) 76'; Clark (yellow card) 90+6'	Report	Nouhou (yellow card) 36'; Ruidíaz (yellow card) 56'; A. Roldan (yellow card) 90'	Stadium: Providence Park; Referee: Allen Chapman

September 27, 2020 47	Vancouver Whitecaps FC	0–1	Portland Timbers	Portland, Oregon
19:00 PST	Gutiérrez (yellow card) 8'; Cavallini (yellow card) 40'; Bikel (yellow card) 45+1'	Report	Mora 5' (Williamson); Farfan (yellow card) 45+3'; Paredes (yellow card) 49'	Stadium: Providence Park; Referee: Ted Unkel
Note: Match will be played in Portland, but the Timbers will act as the away team.

October 3, 2020 48	Portland Timbers	P–P	Colorado Rapids	Portland, Oregon
20:00 PST				Stadium: Providence Park
Note: Match is postponed due to reports that staff and players on Colorado test positive for COVID-19

October 7, 2020 49	LA Galaxy	3–6	Portland Timbers	Carson, California
19:30 PST	Araujo 34'; Sacha Kljestan (yellow card) 42'; Ethan Zubak (yellow card) 50', (goal) 55' (Pavón); Pavón 70', (yellow card) 84'	Report	Mora, Ebobisse 23', 80' (Williamson); Valeri 47'; Mabiala 63'; D. Chará (yellow card) 72'; Paredes (yellow card) 86'	Stadium: Dignity Health Sports Park; Referee: Ramy Touchan

October 11, 2020 50	Portland Timbers	3–0	San Jose Earthquakes	Portland, Oregon
19:00 PDT	Williamson (yellow card) 18'; Farfan (yellow card) 29'; Niezgoda 46', 52'; Mora 86'	Report	Beason (yellow card) 69'; Ríos (yellow card) 79'	Stadium: Providence Park; Referee: Guido Gonzales, Jr.

October 14, 2020 51	Real Salt Lake	2–1	Portland Timbers	Sandy, Utah
18:30 PST	Martínez 11'; Silva (yellow card) 16'; Kreilach 26'; Herrera (yellow card) 82'; Portillo (yellow card) 90+1'	Report	Tuiloma 77'	Stadium: Rio Tinto Stadium; Referee: Robert Sibiga

October 18, 2020 52	Portland Timbers	1–1	Los Angeles FC	Portland, Oregon
19:00 PDT	D. Chará (yellow card) 12'; Williamson (yellow card) 29'; Ebobisse 47'	Report	Harvey (yellow card) 5'; Segura (yellow card) 49'; Jakovic (yellow card) 77'; Torres 90+3'; Opoku (yellow card) 90+6'	Stadium: Providence Park; Referee: Allen Chapman

October 22, 2020 53	Seattle Sounders FC	1–1	Portland Timbers	Seattle, Washington
19:30 PDT	Bruin 90+3'	Report	Flores 10'; Williamson (yellow card) 90+3'	Stadium: Century Link Field; Referee: Ismail Elfath

October 28, 2020 54	Portland Timbers	5–2	LA Galaxy	Portland, Oregon
19:00 PST	Niezgoda 6', 19'; Valeri 30' (pen.); Williamson 60'; Polo 74'	Report	Pavón 46', 90+1'	Stadium: Providence Park; Referee: Drew Fischer

November 1, 2020 55	Portland Timbers	1–0	Vancouver Whitecaps FC	Portland, Oregon
19:00 PST	Y. Chará 61'	Report	Baldisimo (yellow card) 88'	Stadium: Providence Park; Referee: Armando Villarreal

November 4, 2020 56	Portland Timbers	0–1	Colorado Rapids	Portland, Oregon
19:30 PST	D. Chará (yellow card) 49'; Bonilla (yellow card) 81'; Zuparic (yellow card) 90+4'	Report	Acosta 83'; Mezquida (yellow card) 90+1'	Stadium: Providence Park; Referee: Joseph Dickerson

November 8, 2020 57	Los Angeles FC	1–1	Portland Timbers	Los Angeles, California
15:30 PST	Vela 5'; Blessing (yellow card) 27'; Torres (yellow card) 63'	Report	Valeri (yellow card) 31'; Asprilla (yellow card) 81'; Villafaña 90'; Mabiala (yellow card) 90+2'	Stadium: Banc of California Stadium; Referee: Alan Kelly

The 2020 MLS schedule was released on December 19, 2019.

The reopening league schedule was released on August 8, 2020.

The league announced more matches for the month of September on September 8, 2020.

The league announced the remaining matches for the 2020 season on September 22, 2020.

===== Results by round =====
Matchday	1	2	3	4	5	6	7	8	9	10	11	12	13	14	15	16	17	18	19	20	21	22	23	24	25	26	27	28	29	30	31	32	33	34	35	36	37	38	39	40	41	42	43	44	45	46	47	48	49	50	51	52	53	54	55	56	57
Stadium	H	H	A	A	H	A	H	A	H	H	A	H	A	A	A	H	H	A	A	H	A	A	H	H	A	H	N(A)	N(H)	N(A)	H	A	H	A	A	H	H	A	H	A	H	H	A	A	A	A	H	A	H	A	H	A	A	A	H	H	H	A
Result	L	W	P	P	P	P	P	P	P	P	P	P	P	P	P	P	P	P	P	P	P	P	P	P	P	P	W	W	D	P	P	P	P	P	P	P	P	L	P	D	L	W	L	D	W	W	W	P	W								

Updated to match(es) played on October 8, 2020. Source: Major League Soccer
A = Away; H = Home; W = Win; D = Draw; L = Loss

===== Results by location =====
Overall								Home						Away					
Pld	W	D	L	GF	GA	GD	Pts	W	D	L	GF	GA	GD	W	D	L	GF	GA	GD
15	8	3	4	33	27	+6	27	3	1	3	11	14	−3	5	2	1	22	13	+9

Last updated: October 8, 2020.
Source: Major League Soccer

==== Cascadia Cup ====
The Cascadia Cup Council decided that 2020 matches not played in front of supporters, including the MLS is Back Tournament, would not count towards Cascadia Cup standings.

===== Standings =====
Pos	Team	GP	W	L	D	GF	GA	GD	Pts
1	Portland Timbers	0	0	0	0	0	0	0	0
2	Seattle Sounders FC	0	0	0	0	0	0	0	0
3	Vancouver Whitecaps FC	0	0	0	0	0	0	0	0

Last updated: October 28, 2019.
Source: Cascadia Cup

=== MLS Cup Playoffs ===
Win Draw Loss Upcoming fixture

November 22, 2020 First round	Portland Timbers	1–1 (a.e.t.) (7–8 p)	FC Dallas	Portland, Oregon
19:00 PST	Villafaña 82'	Report	Picault (yellow card) 36'; Ricaurte (yellow card) 75'; Pepi 90+3'; Twumasi (yellow card) 120+1'	Stadium: Providence Park; Attendance: 0 Referee: Armando Villarreal
	Penalties
	Valeri (penalty scored); Farfan (penalty scored); Župarić (penalty scored); Ebobisse (penalty scored); Bodily (penalty scored); D. Chará (penalty scored); Loría (penalty scored); Villafaña (penalty missed)		(penalty scored) Ziegler; (penalty scored) Jara; (penalty scored) Bressan; (penalty scored) Pepi; (penalty scored) Hollingshead; (penalty scored) Hedges; (penalty scored) Tessmann; (penalty scored) Twumasi

=== U.S. Open Cup ===
Win Draw Loss Upcoming fixture

The 2020 U.S. Open Cup was cancelled on August 14 due to the COVID-19 Pandemic.

=== Leagues Cup ===
Win Draw Loss Upcoming fixture

July 21/22	Portland Timbers (United States)	Cancelled	(Mexico) TBD	Portland, Oregon
				Stadium: Providence Park
Note: Cancelled due to COVID-19 pandemic.

== Player and staff transactions ==
Per league and club policy, terms of the deals are not disclosed except Targeted Allocation Money, General Allocation Money, draft picks, and international rosters spots.

=== Transfers in ===
Date	Position	Player	Previous club	TAM	GAM	Notes	Source
Winter
November 20, 2019	CB	(Croatia) Dario Župarić	(Croatia) HNK Rijeka	Undisclosed	N/A	Signed to a multi-year contract using Targeted Allocation Money (TAM).	
January 2, 2020	RW	(Colombia) Yimmi Chará	(Brazil) Atlético Mineiro	N/A	N/A	Will occupy Designated Player and International Roster Slot.	
January 24, 2020	MF	(United States) Blake Bodily	(United States) Timbers Academy	N/A	N/A	Signed as a Homegrown Player for 2020 season.	
January 30, 2020	ST	(Poland) Jarosław Niezgoda	(Poland) Legia Warsaw	N/A	N/A	Will occupy Designated Player and International Roster Slot.	
February 25, 2020	DF	(United States) Chris Duvall	(United States) OKC Energy FC	N/A	N/A	Signed for the 2020 season.	
June 18, 2020	RB	(Venezuela) Pablo Bonilla	(United States) Portland Timbers 2	N/A	N/A	Will occupy an International Roster Slot.	
June 22, 2020	DF	(United States) Zac McGraw	(United States) Army	N/A	N/A	Signed from the 2020 MLS SuperDraft.	
Summer

=== Loans in ===
Date	Position	Player	Previous club	TAM	GAM	Notes	Source
Winter
January 31, 2020	ST	(Chile) Felipe Mora	(Mexico) UNAM	N/A	N/A	Will occupy an International Roster Slot. On loan for 1 year with purchase option.	
Summer

=== Loans out ===
Date	Position	Player	Loaned club	TAM	GAM	Notes	Source
Winter
Summer

=== Transfers out ===
Date	Position	Player	Destination club	TAM	GAM	Notes	Source
Winter
November 15, 2019	FW	(Argentina) Brian Fernández	(Argentina) Colón	N/A	N/A	Failed to comply with the league's Substance Abuse and Behavioral Health (SABH) Program.	
November 19, 2019	DF	(United States) Zarek Valentin	(United States) Nashville SC	N/A	$50,000	Selected as the 4th overall pick of the 2019 MLS Expansion Draft.	
November 21, 2019	GK	(United States) Kendall McIntosh	(United States) New York Red Bulls	N/A	N/A	Selected in 2019 MLS Re-Entry Draft	
November 21, 2019	DF	(The Gambia) Modou Jadama	(United States) Atlanta United 2	N/A	N/A	Declined to renew contract.	
November 21, 2019	FW	(United States) Foster Langsdorf	(United States) Reno 1868 FC	N/A	N/A	Declined to renew contract.	
November 21, 2019	DF	(France) Claude Dielna	(Romania) Universitatea Craiova	N/A	N/A	Out of contract.	
June 18, 2020	DF	(Paraguay) Jorge Moreira	(Argentina) River Plate	N/A	N/A	Loan expired with option declined.	
Summer

=== Contract extensions ===
Date	Position	Player	Original Year signed	Extension	Notes	Source
October 29, 2019	MF / FW	(Argentina) Sebastián Blanco	2017	Multiyear	Offered a new multiyear contract as a Designated Player.	
December 16, 2019	MF	(Argentina) Diego Valeri	2013	Multiyear	Offered extension using Targeted Allocation Money (TAM). No longer Designated Player.	
December 19, 2019	DF	(New Zealand) Bill Tuiloma	2017	Multiyear		
December 20, 2019	GK	(United States) Steve Clark	2015	New contract		
February 26. 2020	FW	(United States) Jeremy Ebobisse	2017	Multiyear		

=== 2019 MLS Re-Entry Draft picks ===
Stage	Position	Player	Previous club	Notes	Source
1 (#14)	-	-	-	Passed	
2 (#14)	-	-	-	Passed	

=== 2020 MLS SuperDraft picks ===
Round	Position	Player	College	Other club	Notes	Source
1 (#16)	MF	(Republic of Ireland) Aaron Molloy	(United States) Penn State			
2 (-)					Given to DC United in a trade. (Note: #41: Portland Timbers → DC United. January 23, 2018: D.C. United acquired a second-round selection in the 2020 SuperDraft, an international roster spot for 2018, $100,000 in general allocation money, and $100,000 in targeted allocation money from Portland Timbers in exchange for the MLS rights to midfielder Eryk Williamson. The traded pick is Portland's natural selection.)	
3 (#68)	DF	(United States) Zac McGraw	(United States) Army		Officially signed on June 22, 2020.	
4 (#94)	DF	(Norway) Joergen Oland	(United States) Fordham			

Round 2

=== Staff in ===
Date	Name	Position	Previous club	Previous role	Notes	Source

=== Staff out ===
Date	Name	Former role	New club	New role	Notes	Source

=== Staff extensions ===
Date	Staff	Position	Year signed	Extension	Notes	Source

=== National Team participation ===
Date	Player	Positions	National Team	Notes	Source
October 31, 2019	(United States) Jeremy Ebobisse	FW	United States	Called into the U.S. Men's National Team for a pre-camp in Bradenton, Florida	
November 6, 2019	(Paraguay) Jorge Moreira	DF	Paraguay	Called up for friendlies against Bulgaria on November 14 and Saudi Arabia on November 19.	
November 6, 2019	(New Zealand) Bill Tuiloma	DF	New Zealand	Called up for friendlies against Ireland on November 14 and Lithuania on November 17.	
November 6, 2019	(Venezuela) Renzo Zambrano	MF	Venezuela	Called up for friendlies against Japan on November 19	
November 6, 2019	(Peru) Andy Polo	MF	Peru	Called up for friendlies against Colombia on November 14 and Chile on November 19.	
December 6, 2019	(Costa Rica) Marvin Loría	FW	Costa Rica U-23	Called up for training camp from December 9–15.	
March 9, 2020	(United States) Jeremy Ebobisse	FW	United States U-23	Called up for 2020 Olympic qualifying in Guadalajara, Mexico from March 20 – April 1.	
October 6, 2020	(Peru) Andy Polo	MF	Peru	Called up by Peru for 2022 FIFA World Cup qualifying matches against Paraguay and Brazil.	

=== 2020 MLS All-Star participation ===
Date	Player	Positions	Opponent club	Selection process	Source

== Honors and awards ==
=== MLS is Back Tournament Best XI ===
Player	Position	Ref
(United States) Jeremy Ebobisse	FW	
(Argentina) Sebastián Blanco	MF	
(Colombia) Diego Chará	MF	
(Democratic Republic of the Congo) Larrys Mabiala	DF	

=== MLS Player of the Tournament ===
Tournament	Player	Ref
MLS is Back Tournament	(Argentina) Sebastián Blanco	

=== MLS Goal of the Tournament ===
Tournament	Result	Player	Ref
MLS is Back Tournament	Won	(Peru) Andy Polo	

=== MLS Save of the Tournament ===
Tournament	Result	Player	Ref
MLS is Back Tournament	Won	(United States) Steve Clark	

=== MLS Player of the Week ===
Week	Player	Ref
12	(Argentina) Diego Valeri	
16	(United States) Jeremy Ebobisse	

=== MLS Goal of the Week ===
Week	Result	Player	Ref

=== MLS Team of the Week ===
Week	Area	Player/Manager	Ref
2	Bench	(United States) Steve Clark	
2	Bench	(Croatia) Dario Župarić	
MiBT Round 1	Bench	(Argentina) Sebastián Blanco	
MiBT Round 2	Pitch	(United States) Jeremy Ebobisse	
MiBT Round 2	Bench	(Democratic Republic of the Congo) Larrys Mabiala	
MiBT Round 3	Pitch	(United States) Jeremy Ebobisse	
MiBT Round of 16	Bench	(Argentina) Sebastián Blanco	
10	Pitch	(United States) Eryk Williamson	
12	Pitch	(Argentina) Diego Valeri	
12	Bench	(Colombia) Diego Chará	
13	Pitch	(United States) Steve Clark	
14	Bench	(Chile) Felipe Mora	

== Statistics ==
=== Appearances and discipline ===
Numbers in parentheses denote appearances as a substitute.

(T2) = Players called up from Portland Timbers 2 for short-term contracts.

No.	Pos.	Name	MLS				MLS Playoffs				MLS is Back Tournament				Total			
No.	Pos.	Name	Apps	Booked	(yellow card) (yellow-red card)	Sent off (straight red)	Apps	Booked	(yellow card) (yellow-red card)	Sent off (straight red)	Apps	Booked	(yellow card) (yellow-red card)	Sent off (straight red)	Apps	Booked	(yellow card) (yellow-red card)	Sent off (straight red)
1	GK	(United States) Jeff Attinella	0	0	0	0	0	0	0	0	0	0	0	0	0	0	0	0
4	DF	(United States) Jorge Villafaña	9	1	0	0	0	0	0	0	6 (1)	3	0	0	15 (1)	4	0	0
7	FW	(Peru) Andy Polo	5 (4)	0	0	0	0	0	0	0	1 (6)	0	0	0	6 (10)	0	0	0
8	MF	(Argentina) Diego Valeri	9 (2)	1	0	0	0	0	0	0	5 (2)	0	0	0	14 (4)	1	0	0
9	FW	(Chile) Felipe Mora	8 (3)	0	0	0	0	0	0	0	0 (4)	0	0	0	8 (7)	0	0	0
10	MF	(Argentina) Sebastián Blanco	5 (1)	0	0	0	0	0	0	0	7	2	0	0	12 (1)	2	0	0
11	FW	(Poland) Jarosław Niezgoda	6 (3)	0	0	0	0	0	0	0	1 (6)	0	0	0	7 (9)	0	0	0
12	GK	(United States) Steve Clark	11	0	0	0	0	0	0	0	7	0	0	0	18	0	0	0
13	DF	(Croatia) Dario Župarić	9	1	0	0	0	0	0	0	6	0	1	0	15	1	1	0
14	DF	(El Salvador) Andrés Flores	0	0	0	0	0	0	0	0	0	0	0	0	0	0	0	0
15	DF	(United States) Chris Duvall	5	1	0	0	0	0	0	0	5 (1)	1	0	0	10 (1)	2	0	0
17	FW	(United States) Jeremy Ebobisse	7 (5)	1	0	0	0	0	0	0	6 (1)	0	0	0	13 (6)	1	0	0
18	DF	(Costa Rica) Julio Cascante	4 (1)	0	0	0	0	0	0	0	0	0	0	0	4 (1)	0	0	0
19	MF	(Argentina) Tomás Conechny	3 (2)	1	0	0	0	0	0	0	0	0	0	0	3 (2)	1	0	0
21	MF	(Colombia) Diego Chará	10	5	0	0	0	0	0	0	7	2	0	0	17	7	0	0
22	MF	(Paraguay) Cristhian Paredes	6 (5)	4	0	0	0	0	0	0	1	1	0	0	7 (5)	5	0	0
23	MF	(Colombia) Yimmi Chará	5 (5)	0	0	0	0	0	0	0	3 (2)	0	0	0	8 (7)	0	0	0
25	DF	(New Zealand) Bill Tuiloma	4 (1)	0	0	0	0	0	0	0	2 (3)	0	0	0	6 (4)	0	0	0
27	MF	(Colombia) Dairon Asprilla	0 (1)	0	0	0	0	0	0	0	0	0	0	0	0 (1)	0	0	0
28	DF	(Venezuela) Pablo Bonilla	5 (1)	2	0	0	0	0	0	0	2 (1)	0	0	0	7 (2)	2	0	0
30	MF	(United States) Eryk Williamson	8 (3)	2	0	0	0	0	0	0	6 (1)	2	0	0	14 (4)	4	0	0
31	GK	(Slovenia) Aljaž Ivačič	1	0	0	0	0	0	0	0	0	0	0	0	1	0	0	0
32	DF	(United States) Marco Farfan	4 (1)	1	0	0	0	0	0	0	1	0	0	0	5 (1)	1	0	0
33	DF	(Democratic Republic of the Congo) Larrys Mabiala	7 (1)	2	0	0	0	0	0	0	6	2	0	0	13 (1)	4	0	0
40	MF	(Venezuela) Renzo Zambrano	1 (2)	1	0	0	0	0	0	0	0	0	0	0	1 (2)	1	0	0
44	FW	(United States) Marvin Loría	5 (5)	0	0	0	0	0	0	0	5 (1)	0	0	0	10 (6)	0	0	0
85	DF	(United States) Zac McGraw	0	0	0	0	0	0	0	0	0	0	0	0	0	0	0	0
98	MF	(United States) Blake Bodily	0	0	0	0	0	0	0	0	0 (1)	0	0	0	0 (1)	0	0	0
Players who were transferred/waived from the club during active season or on loan
	DF	(Paraguay) Jorge Moreira	1	0	0	0	0	0	0	0	0	0	0	0	1	0	0	0

Last updated: October 8, 2020.
Source: Competitions

=== Goalkeeper stats ===
The list is sorted by total minutes played then by jersey number.

No.	Player	MLS				MLS Playoffs				MLS is Back Tournament				Total			
No.	Player	MIN	GA	GAA	SV	MIN	GA	GAA	SV	MIN	GA	GAA	SV	MIN	GA	GAA	SV
12	(United States) Steve Clark	450	11	2.20	14	0	0	0.00	0	630	8	1.14	20	1080	19	1.58	34
1	(United States) Jeff Attinella	90	3	3.00	4	0	0	0.00	0	0	0	0.00	0	90	3	3.00	4
31	(Slovenia) Aljaž Ivačič	0	0	0.00	0	0	0	0.00	0	0	0	0.00	0	0	0	0.00	0
	TOTALS	540	14	2.33	18	0	0	0.00	0	630	8	1.14	20	1170	22	1.69	38

Last updated: September 7, 2020.
Source: Competitions

=== Top scorers ===
The list is sorted by shirt number when total goals are equal.

Rnk	Pos	No.	Player	MLS	MLS Cup Playoffs	MLS is Back Tournament	Total
1	FW	8	(Argentina) Diego Valeri	6	0	2	8
1	FW	17	(United States) Jeremy Ebobisse	4	0	4	8
3	FW	9	(Chile) Felipe Mora	6	0	0	6
5	MF	10	(Argentina) Sebastián Blanco	1	0	3	4
5	FW	11	(Poland) Jarosław Niezgoda	2	0	2	4
6	MF	23	(Colombia) Yimmi Chará	3	0	0	3
8	MF	30	(United States) Eryk Williamson	2	0	0	2
8	DF	33	(Democratic Republic of the Congo) Larrys Mabiala	1	0	1	2
12	FW	7	(Peru) Andy Polo	0	0	1	1
12	DF	13	(Croatia) Dario Župarić	0	0	1	1
12	DF	18	(Costa Rica) Julio Cascante	1	0	0	1
12	DF	21	(Colombia) Diego Chará	1	0	0	1
Own goals				0	0	0	0
TOTALS				27	0	14	41

Last updated: October 8, 2020.
Source: Competitions

=== Top assists ===
The list is sorted by shirt number when total assists are equal.

Rnk	Pos	No.	Player	MLS	MLS Cup Playoffs	MLS is Back Tournament	Total
1	MF	8	(Argentina) Diego Valeri	3	0	4	7
1	MF	10	(Argentina) Sebastián Blanco	2	0	5	7
3	MF	30	(United States) Eryk Williamson	2	0	2	4
5	FW	11	(United States) Jeremy Ebobisse	2	0	1	3
5	DF	21	(Colombia) Diego Chará	3	0	0	3
13	DF	4	(United States) Jorge Villafaña	1	0	0	1
13	MF	7	(Peru) Andy Polo	1	0	0	1
13	FW	11	(Poland) Jarosław Niezgoda	0	0	1	1
13	DF	13	(Croatia) Dario Župarić	0	0	1	1
13	MF	23	(Colombia) Yimmi Chará	1	0	0	1
13	DF	25	(New Zealand) Bill Tuiloma	0	0	1	1
13	DF	33	(Democratic Republic of the Congo) Larrys Mabiala	0	0	1	1
13	MF	44	(Costa Rica) Marvin Loría	0	0	1	1
TOTALS				15	0	17	32

Last updated: September 28, 2020.
Source: Competitions

=== Shutouts ===
The list is sorted by shirt number when total clean sheets are equal.

Rnk	No.	Player	MLS	MLS Cup Playoffs	MLS is Back Tournament	Total
1	8	(United States) Steve Clark	3	0	0	3
TOTALS			3	0	0	3

Last updated: October 8, 2020.
Source: Competitions

=== Summary ===
Games played	18 (11 MLS) (7 MLS is Back Tournament)
Games won	10 (5 MLS) (5 MLS is Back Tournament)
Games drawn	4 (1 MLS) (2 MLS is Back Tournament)
Games lost	4 (4 MLS)
Goals scored	35 (21 MLS) (14 MLS is Back Tournament)
Goals conceded	28 (20 MLS) (8 MLS is Back Tournament)
Goal difference	+7 (+1 MLS) (+6 MLS is Back Tournament)
Clean sheets	3 (3 MLS)
Yellow cards	36 (23 MLS) (13 MLS is Back Tournament)
Red cards	1 (1 MLS is Back Tournament)
Most appearances	(United States) Jeremy Ebobisse (18 appearances)
Top scorer	(Argentina) Diego Valeri (7 goals)
Top assists	(Argentina) Diego Valeri, (Argentina) Sebastián Blanco (7 assists)
Top shutouts	(United States) Steve Clark (3 shutouts)
Winning percentage	Overall: 10/18 (55.56%)

Last updated: September 28, 2020.
Source: Competitions
