= Jorge Villafaña =

American soccer player

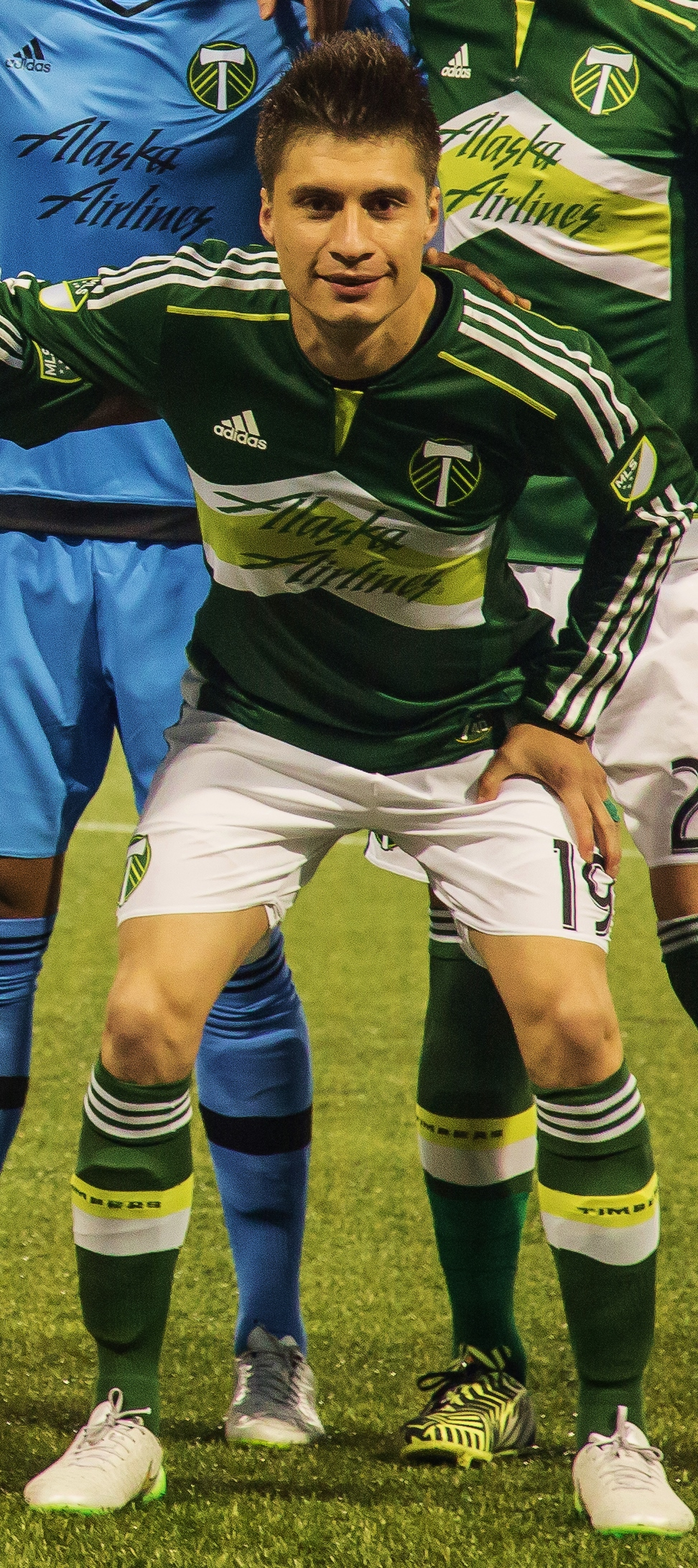
- Villafaña with the Portland Timbers in 2015

Personal information
- Full name: Jorge Antonio Flores Villafaña
- Date of birth: September 16, 1989 (age 37)
- Place of birth: Anaheim, California, United States
- Height: 5 ft 9 in (1.75 m)
- Position: Left-back

Youth career
- 2004–2007: Santa Ana DSP Juventus
- 2007: Chivas USA

Senior career*
Years	Team	Apps	(Gls)
2007–2013	Chivas USA	86	(7)
2014–2015	Portland Timbers	52	(2)
2016–2018	Santos Laguna	60	(0)
2018–2020	Portland Timbers	50	(1)
2021–2022	LA Galaxy	21	(0)
Total		269	(10)

International career^{‡}
2007–2009	United States U20	15	(1)
2012	United States U23	2	(0)
2017–2018	United States	21	(0)

Managerial career
- 2024–: PDX FC
Medal record
Representing United States
Runner-up	CONCACAF U-20 Championship	2009
- * Club domestic league appearances and goals as of September 26, 2021 ‡ National team caps and goals as of November 20, 2018

Jorge Antonio Flores Villafaña (born September 16, 1989) is an American former professional soccer player who played as a left-back. He is currently the head coach for Westside Metros.

== Career ==
=== Youth ===
Villafaña spent part of his childhood in Pénjamo, Guanajuato, Mexico before returning to the United States for high school. He attended Anaheim High School and became captain of the soccer team. In March 2007, Villafaña won Sueño MLS, a reality show that led to a try-out with Major League Soccer. His reality show win earned him the nickname "Sueño". Villafaña beat out around 2,000 other competitors to earn a spot on Chivas USA's U-19 squad.

=== Professional ===
Villafaña was signed by Chivas USA to a professional contract in July 2007. He made his only appearance of the season as a substitute in a 3–0 win over New York Red Bulls. He scored in 2008 season debut against D.C. United as a substitute. Villafaña made his first career start the following week against the Colorado Rapids and scored on a glancing header to seal the game for Chivas USA. Villafaña scored again the following week against the Columbus Crew. While with Chivas USA, Villafaña appeared in 86 league matches and scored 7 goals.

After the 2013 season, Villafaña was traded to the Portland Timbers. He would make 50 starts over two seasons with the Timbers. The Timbers won 2015 MLS Cup; Villafaña's performance in that victory was highlighted as strong by several analysts and commentators.

Following the triumph, Villafaña was sold to Liga MX club Santos Laguna for a reported fee of just under $1 million.

On August 8, 2018, Villafaña was re-acquired by the Portland Timbers.

On January 12, 2021, Villafaña was traded to LA Galaxy.

On April 18, 2024, Jorge officially announced his retirement across his social media platforms.

=== International ===
In 2007, Villafaña was called up for the United States U-20 for its trip to Buenos Aires, Argentina from November 23 to December 3. The team was part of an 11-day training camp with the U-20 squads of Paraguay, Argentina, and Uruguay. Villafaña played in all three of the U.S. games during the trip. A game tying assist against River Plate's reserves and a game-tying goal against the Argentina national under-20 team helped earn him the honor of team captain.

Villafaña appeared in all three of the U.S. games at the 2008 Campos Verde International in Beja, Portugal. Villafaña scored his second international goal against the Bolton Wanderers Reserves in a 2–0 win in Bolton, England on May 7, 2008. He assisted a goal in the U.S. 2–1 win over the Manchester United Reserves the following day.

On January 29, 2017, Villafaña made his full United States debut in a friendly against Serbia. He went on to establish himself as the USMNT's first-choice left back for the unsuccessful 2018 World Cup qualifying campaign. On March 25, he was cap-tied to the United States in a World Cup qualifying match against Honduras. In July 2017 he helped the USMNT win the CONCACAF Gold Cup with his play in several games, including starts in the semifinal 2–0 win over Costa Rica and the final 2–1 win over Jamaica.

=== Coaching ===
Villafaña was named head coach for the PDX FC men's team in February 2024.

== Personal life ==
In November 2011, Villafaña changed his name from Jorge Flores to Jorge Villafaña opting to take his mother's maiden name as his last name.

On May 17, 2018, Jorge and his wife were robbed of over US$20,000 in a shopping mall after exchanging currency after the first leg of the 2018 Liga MX final.

== Honors ==
Portland Timbers

- MLS Cup: 2015
- Western Conference (playoffs): 2015
- MLS is Back Tournament: 2020

Santos Laguna

- Liga MX: Clausura 2018

United States U20

- CONCACAF U-20 Championship: 2009

United States

- CONCACAF Gold Cup: 2017

== See also ==
- Sueño MLS
