= Jarosław Niezgoda =

Polish footballer (born 1995)

- Niezgoda with the Portland Timbers in 2023

Personal information
- Date of birth: 15 March 1995 (age 31)
- Place of birth: Poniatowa, Poland
- Height: 1.85 m (6 ft 1 in)
- Position: Forward

Youth career
- –2008: Opolanin Opole Lubelskie
- 2008–2012: Wisła Puławy

Senior career*
| Years | Team | Apps | (Gls) |
| 2012–2016 | Wisła Puławy | 64 | (24) |
| 2016–2020 | Legia Warsaw | 51 | (27) |
| 2016–2019 | Legia Warsaw II | 17 | (12) |
| 2016–2017 | → Ruch Chorzów (loan) | 27 | (10) |
| 2020–2023 | Portland Timbers | 80 | (20) |
| 2020 | Portland Timbers 2 | 1 | (0) |
| 2025–2026 | Pogoń Siedlce | 12 | (0) |

International career
| 2017 | Poland U21 | 5 | (1) |
- * Club domestic league appearances and goals as of 20:26, 26 May 2026 (UTC)

Jarosław Niezgoda (born 15 March 1995) is a Polish professional footballer who plays as a forward.

== Club career ==
Jarosław Niezgoda started his career with the Lublin club Opolanin Opole Lubelskie in 2006. His second junior club was Wisła Puławy, which he joined in 2008. The striker made his debut for the first team in 2012, coming off the bench in a match against Pelikan Łowicz in the 67th minute. Niezgoda had a break-out 2013–14 season, appearing in 29 games and scoring 12 goals.

In 2016, Legia Warsaw signed Niezgoda. He primarily played with their reserves team and was loaned out to Ruch Chorzów. He scored his first goal for Legia's first team on 20 August 2017 in a 1–0 win against Wisła Płock in the sixth matchday of the 2017–18 season. On 1 September 2019, he scored a hat-trick in a 3–1 win against Raków Częstochowa.

He was acquired by Portland in January 2020. He suffered a torn ACL during a November 2020 match against Vancouver Whitecaps. On 25 June 2022, Niezgoda recorded a brace in the second half, during a 3-0 victory over the Colorado Rapids. As of April 2023, Niezgoda was the most efficient goal scorer in MLS history, converting on over 48% of his attempts. On 20 August 2023, he suffered another ACL tear during a league game against Houston Dynamo, ruling him out of play for approximately nine months. He was released at the end of 2023.

On 22 September 2025, after over 20 months without a club, Niezgoda signed with I liga club Pogoń Siedlce for the rest of the season. He made his first competitive appearance in 825 days on 23 November, entering the pitch as a substitute in a goalless draw against Wisła Kraków. He was released at the end of his contract in June 2026.

== International career ==
Niezgoda made five appearances and tallied one goal for the under-21 team, including three outings during the 2017 UEFA European Under-21 Championship.

== Personal life ==
Niezgoda was born in Poniatowa, Poland. Growing up his family had a big yard, where he, his brothers and father would play soccer. Niezgoda proposed to his longtime girlfriend, Izabela Kujawska in October 2020 on the Oregon Coast. Six months later, the couple would welcome their daughter Zofia in March 2021. Jarosław has a Cavalier King Charles Spaniel named Leo.

== Career statistics ==
As of match played 15 May 2026

Appearances and goals by club, season and competition
| Club | Season | League | | | National cup (Note: Includes Polish Cup, U.S. Open Cup) | | Continental | | Other | | Total | |
| Club | Season | Division | Apps | Goals | Apps | Goals | Apps | Goals | Apps | Goals | Apps | Goals |
|---|---|---|---|---|---|---|---|---|---|---|---|---|
| Wisła Puławy | 2012–13 | II liga | 2 | 0 | 0 | 0 | — | | — | | 2 | 0 |
| Wisła Puławy | 2013–14 | II liga | 16 | 3 | 0 | 0 | — | | — | | 16 | 3 |
| Wisła Puławy | 2014–15 | II liga | 28 | 12 | 1 | 0 | — | | — | | 29 | 12 |
| Wisła Puławy | 2015–16 | II liga | 18 | 9 | 2 | 0 | — | | — | | 20 | 9 |
| Wisła Puławy | Total | | 64 | 24 | 3 | 0 | — | | — | | 67 | 24 |
| Legia Warsaw | 2015–16 | Ekstraklasa | 0 | 0 | 0 | 0 | — | | — | | 0 | 0 |
| Legia Warsaw | 2016–17 | Ekstraklasa | 1 | 0 | 0 | 0 | 0 | 0 | 0 | 0 | 1 | 0 |
| Legia Warsaw | 2017–18 | Ekstraklasa | 27 | 13 | 5 | 2 | — | | 1 (Note: Appearance in Polish Super Cup) | 0 | 33 | 15 |
| Legia Warsaw | 2018–19 | Ekstraklasa | 5 | 0 | 0 | 0 | — | | — | | 5 | 0 |
| Legia Warsaw | 2019–20 | Ekstraklasa | 18 | 14 | 1 | 0 | 2 (Note: Appearances in UEFA Europa League) | 0 | — | | 21 | 14 |
| Legia Warsaw | Total | | 51 | 27 | 6 | 2 | 2 | 0 | 1 | 0 | 60 | 29 |
| Ruch Chorzów (loan) | 2016–17 | Ekstraklasa | 27 | 10 | 1 | 0 | — | | — | | 28 | 10 |
| Portland Timbers | 2020 | Major League Soccer | 17 | 7 | — | | — | | 4 (Note: Appearances in MLS is Back Tournament) | 1 | 21 | 8 |
| Portland Timbers | 2021 | Major League Soccer | 13 | 3 | 4 | 0 | — | | — | | 17 | 3 |
| Portland Timbers | 2022 | Major League Soccer | 30 | 9 | 1 | 0 | — | | 0 | 0 | 31 | 9 |
| Portland Timbers | 2023 | Major League Soccer | 20 | 1 | 2 | 2 | — | | 3 (Note: Appearances in Leagues Cup) | 0 | 25 | 3 |
| Portland Timbers | Total | | 80 | 20 | 7 | 2 | — | | 7 | 1 | 94 | 23 |
| Pogoń Siedlce | 2025–26 | I liga | 12 | 0 | — | | — | | — | | 12 | 0 |
| Career total | | | 234 | 81 | 17 | 4 | 2 | 0 | 8 | 3 | 261 | 86 |

== Honours ==
Legia Warsaw

- Ekstraklasa: 2016–17, 2017–18, 2019–20
- Polish Cup: 2017–18

Portland Timbers

- MLS is Back Tournament: 2020

Individual

- Ekstraklasa Discovery of the Season: 2016–17
- Ekstraklasa Player of the Month: November 2019, December 2019
