= Pablo Bonilla =

Venezuelan footballer (born 1999)

Personal information
- Full name: Pablo Alejandro Bonilla Serrada
- Date of birth: 2 December 1999 (age 26)
- Place of birth: Acarigua, Venezuela
- Height: 1.73 m (5 ft 8 in)
- Position: Right-back

Team information
- Current team: Anzoátegui

Youth career
- Portuguesa

Senior career*
Years	Team	Apps	(Gls)
2017–2019	Portuguesa	65	(2)
2019	Deportivo La Guaira	6	(1)
2020–2023	Portland Timbers 2	16	(0)
2020–2023	Portland Timbers	38	(0)
2024	Universidad Central	25	(0)
2025	Carabobo	23	(0)
2026-	Anzoátegui	1	(0)

International career^{‡}
2019	Venezuela U20	12	(0)
- * Club domestic league appearances and goals as of 18 April 2025 ‡ National team caps and goals as of 23 December 2019

Pablo Alejandro Bonilla Serrada (born 2 December 1999) is a Venezuelan professional footballer who plays as a right-back for Anzoátegui.

== Career ==
In January 2020, Bonilla signed with Portland Timbers. He was waived by Portland on 21 July 2023.

== Honours ==
Portland Timbers

- MLS is Back Tournament: 2020
