= MLS is Back Tournament final =

Championship game of the MLS is Back Tournament

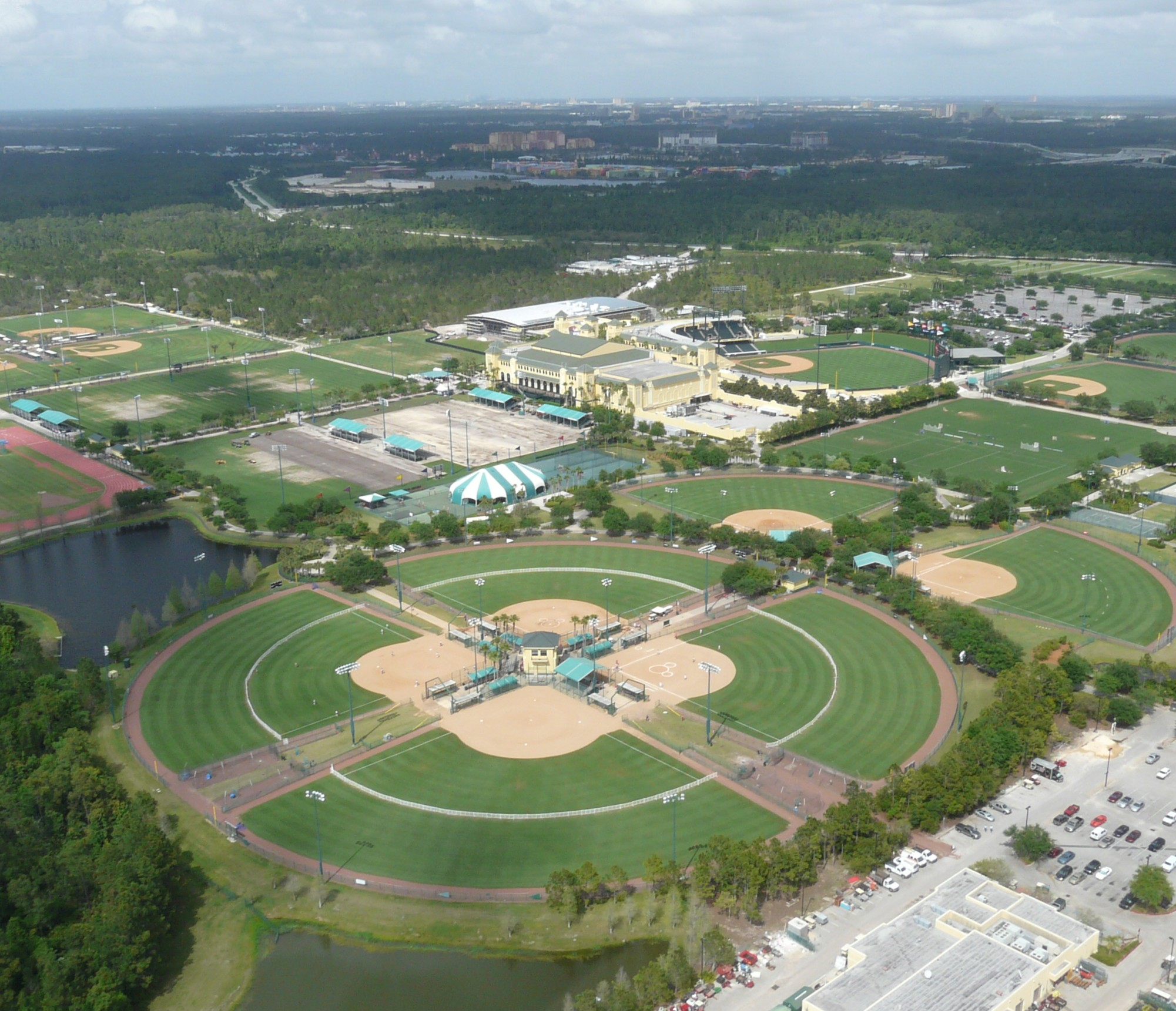
- ESPN Wide World of Sports Complex in Bay Lake hosted the final.
- Event: MLS is Back Tournament
Portland Timbers	Orlando City SC
2	1
- Date: August 11, 2020
- Venue: ESPN Wide World of Sports Complex, Bay Lake, Florida, US
- Man of the Match: Diego Valeri (Portland Timbers)
- Referee: Ismail Elfath
- Attendance: 0 (behind closed doors)

The MLS is Back Tournament final, known as the MLS is Back Tournament Final presented by Wells Fargo for sponsorship reasons, was a soccer match held on August 11, 2020 at the ESPN Wide World of Sports Complex near Orlando, Florida. It was the final match of the MLS is Back Tournament, a competition marking the resumption of the 2020 Major League Soccer season following the initial wave of the COVID-19 pandemic. The match was played behind closed doors due to the pandemic, and broadcast on ESPN beginning at 8:00 p.m. Eastern Time.

Portland Timbers won the match 2–1 to win the MLS is Back Tournament and were presented the trophy after the game. As winners, Portland received $300,000 in prize money and also earned a spot in the 2021 CONCACAF Champions League. They qualified for the United States' third berth, replacing the 2020 MLS Eastern or Western Conference regular season champions which are not the Supporters' Shield champions.

The match was the first MLS final refereed by a woman, with Kathryn Nesbitt acting as an Assistant Referee.

== Road to the final ==
Portland Timbers
Round
Orlando City SC
Opponents
Results
Group stage
Opponents
Results
LA Galaxy
2–1
Match 1
Inter Miami CF
2–1
Houston Dynamo
2–1
Match 2
New York City FC
3–1
Los Angeles FC
2–2
Match 3
Philadelphia Union
1–1
Group F winners

Group F results
Pos	Team	Pld	Pts
1	Portland Timbers	3	7
2	Los Angeles FC	3	5
3	Houston Dynamo	3	2
4	LA Galaxy	3	1

Source: MLS
Final standings
Group A winners

Group A results
Pos	Team	Pld	Pts
1	Orlando City SC (H)	3	7
2	Philadelphia Union	3	7
3	New York City FC	3	3
4	Inter Miami CF	3	0

Source: MLS
(H) Hosts
Opponents
Results
Knockout stage
Opponents
Results
FC Cincinnati
1–1 (4–2 p)
Round of 16
Montreal Impact
1–0
New York City FC
3–1
Quarter-finals
Los Angeles FC
1–1 (5–4 p)
Philadelphia Union
2–1
Semi-finals
Minnesota United FC
3–1

== Match ==
=== Summary ===
Portland played in a defensive posture for much of the game, allowing Orlando 64% of the possession but not letting them get into good shooting positions. In the 27th minute Portland scored first, with Larrys Mabiala scoring a header from a free kick by Diego Valeri. Orlando responded with a goal 12 minutes later via a move to the end-line by Nani and a pass to the near post that Mauricio Pereyra finished. Portland scored again about 3/4 of the way through the game; Valeri sent a corner kick to Eryk Williamson, who controlled the ball and sent it toward goal, where Jeremy Ebobisse redirected it to Dario Župarić for a tap-in through Nani's legs. Both of Portland's goals were scored by center backs. The game opened up after that, with Orlando committing more players forward in an attempt to level the score, but Portland's defense continued to hold them off until the final whistle. The game finished with Orlando having only one shot on goal – namely their goal – while Portland had six.

=== Details ===
August 11, 2020
8:30 p.m. EDT

Portland Timbers	2–1	Orlando City SC
Mabiala 27'; Župarić 66'	Report	Pereyra 39'

ESPN Wide World of Sports Complex, Bay Lake, Florida
Attendance: 0 (behind closed doors)
Referee: Ismail Elfath

Portland Timbers	Orlando City SC

GK	12	(United States) Steve Clark
RB	15	(United States) Chris Duvall
CB	33	(Democratic Republic of the Congo) Larrys Mabiala	(yellow card) 44'
CB	13	(Croatia) Dario Župarić
LB	4	(United States) Jorge Villafaña	(yellow card) 73'
CM	21	(Colombia) Diego Chará	(yellow card) 70'
CM	30	(United States) Eryk Williamson
RW	44	(Costa Rica) Marvin Loría		(substituted off) 67'
AM	8	(Argentina) Diego Valeri (c)		(substituted off) 90+1'
LW	10	(Argentina) Sebastián Blanco		(substituted off) 89'
CF	17	(United States) Jeremy Ebobisse		(substituted off) 67'
Substitutes:
GK	1	(United States) Jeff Attinella
GK	31	(Slovenia) Aljaž Ivačič
DF	18	(Costa Rica) Julio Cascante
DF	25	(New Zealand) Bill Tuiloma		(substituted on) 90+1'
DF	28	(Venezuela) Pablo Bonilla
DF	32	(United States) Marco Farfan
MF	19	(Argentina) Tomás Conechny
MF	22	(Paraguay) Cristhian Paredes
MF	40	(Venezuela) Renzo Zambrano
FW	7	(Peru) Andy Polo		(substituted on) 67'
FW	9	(Chile) Felipe Mora		(substituted on) 89'
FW	11	(Poland) Jarosław Niezgoda		(substituted on) 67'
Manager:
(Venezuela) Giovanni Savarese

GK	1	(Peru) Pedro Gallese
RB	2	(Brazil) Ruan	(yellow card) 85'	(substituted off) 87'
CB	25	(Brazil) Antônio Carlos	(yellow card) 47'
CB	6	(Sweden) Robin Jansson
LB	4	(Portugal) João Moutinho	(yellow card) 63'
CM	20	(Spain) Oriol Rosell		(substituted off) 79'
CM	8	(Ecuador) Sebas Méndez		(substituted off) 71'
RW	9	(United States) Chris Mueller		(substituted off) 71'
AM	10	(Uruguay) Mauricio Pereyra
LW	17	(Portugal) Nani (c)	(yellow card) 73'
CF	13	(Canada) Tesho Akindele		(substituted off) 78'
Substitutes:
GK	23	(United States) Brian Rowe
DF	3	(United States) Alex DeJohn
DF	15	(Argentina) Rodrigo Schlegel
DF	24	(United States) Kyle Smith		(substituted on) 87'
DF	27	(Canada) Kamal Miller
MF	11	(Brazil) Júnior Urso		(substituted on) 71'
MF	21	(Colombia) Andrés Perea
MF	34	(Jamaica) Joey DeZart
MF	77	(Brazil) Robinho
FW	18	(United States) Daryl Dike		(substituted on) 78'
FW	19	(United States) Benji Michel		(substituted on) 71'
FW	29	(Colombia) Santiago Patiño		(substituted on) 79'
Manager:
(Colombia) Óscar Pareja

Man of the Match:
Diego Valeri (Portland Timbers)

Assistant referees:
Kathryn Nesbitt
Kyle Atkins
Fourth official:
Joe Dickerson
Video assistant referee:
Allen Chapman
Assistant video assistant referee:
Logan Brown

Match rules

- 90 minutes, with no extra time.
- Penalty shoot-out if scores level.
- Maximum of twelve named substitutes.
- Maximum of five substitutions. (Note: Each team was given only three opportunities to make substitutions, excluding substitutions made at half-time.)

=== Statistical comparision ===
Team-to-team comparison
Statistic	Portland Timbers	Orlando City SC
Shots	13	14
Shots on target	6	1
Saves	0	4
Clearances	19	11
Ball possession	36%	64%
Passes	284	503
Corner kicks	5	3
Fouls committed	15	17
Offsides	1	1
Yellow cards	3	4
Red cards	0	0

== Broadcasting ==
The match was broadcast on ESPN.
