= Larrys Mabiala =

Congolese footballer (born 1987)

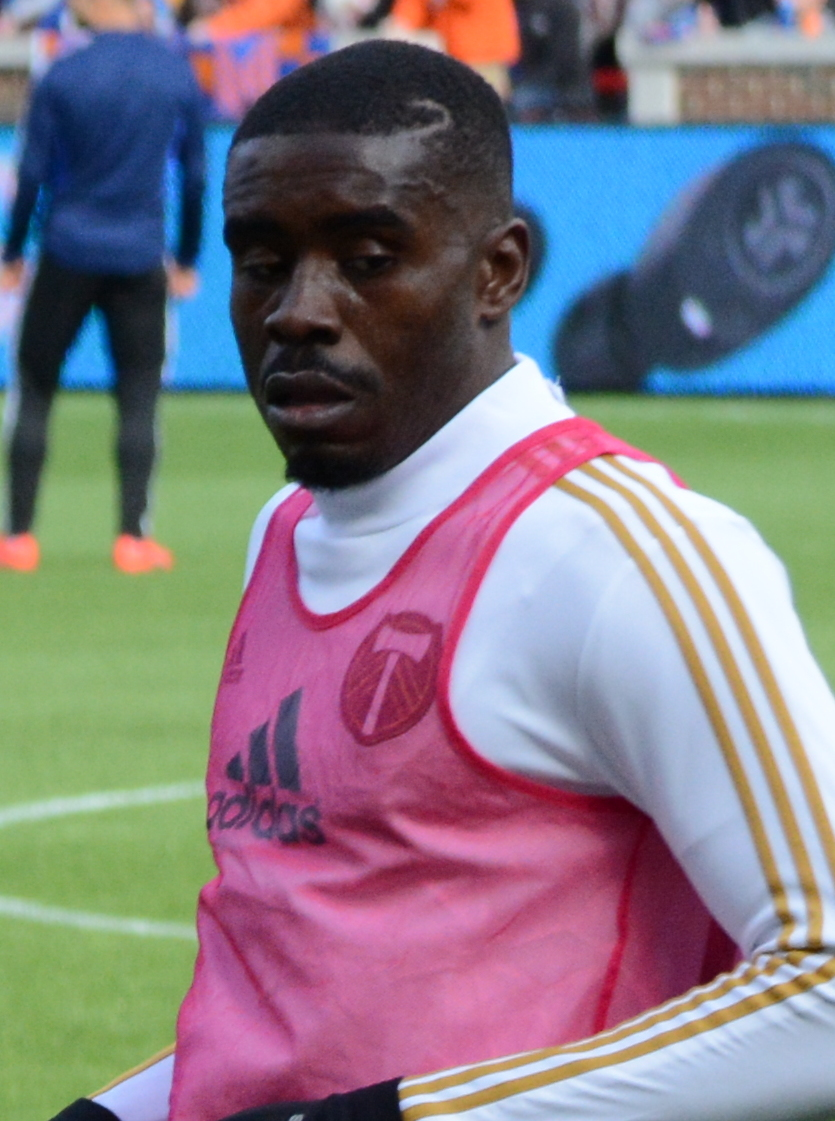
- Mabiala with Portland Timbers in 2019

Personal information
- Full name: Larrys Mabiala Destin
- Date of birth: 8 October 1987 (age 39)
- Place of birth: Montfermeil, France
- Height: 1.89 m (6 ft 2 in)
- Position: Defender

Team information
- Current team: Portland Timbers
- Number: 33

Youth career
- 2002–2007: Paris Saint-Germain

Senior career*
Years	Team	Apps	(Gls)
2006–2009	Paris Saint-Germain	3	(1)
2007	→ Plymouth Argyle (loan)	0	(0)
2009–2012	Nice	36	(0)
2012–2015	Karabükspor	106	(3)
2015–2017	Kayserispor	55	(3)
2017–2024	Portland Timbers	152	(9)

International career^{‡}
2007	France U21	1	(0)
2008–2013	DR Congo	12	(0)
- * Club domestic league appearances and goals as of 31 July 2024 ‡ National team caps and goals as of 25 January 2013

Larrys Mabiala Destin (born 8 October 1987) is a former professional footballer who last played for the Portland Timbers, having previously played for Turkish Süper Lig club Kayserispor as a defender, Paris Saint-Germain, Plymouth Argyle, and Nice. Born in France, he has previously represented the DR Congo national team.

== Club career ==
Mabiala began playing football at a young age, representing Nogent-on-Oise and Chantilly, before joining Paris Saint-Germain at the age of 14. He signed his first professional contract in November 2006 and made two appearances during the 2006–07 season, in the Coupe de la Ligue and UEFA Cup. A France under-21 international, Mabiala joined English club Plymouth Argyle on a season-long loan in August 2007. A long-term knee injury blighted his time with the club, forcing him to return to Paris for treatment, and the loan was eventually cancelled. Mabiala returned to Paris Saint-Germain in January 2008 and went on to make three appearances in Ligue 1, scoring once.

He was transferred to fellow Ligue 1 side Nice in June 2009 for an undisclosed fee and signed a four-year contract. Two and a half years later, Mabiala left Nice to join Turkish club Karabükspor for an undisclosed fee, having agreed a contract with the Süper Lig side until the summer of 2014.

Mabiala signed a two-year contract with Kayserispor on 7 August 2015.

On 29 May 2017, a team source confirmed that the Portland Timbers signed Mabiala. He scored the opening goal in the MLS is Back Tournament Final.

== International career ==
Having represented France at youth international level, Mabiala received his first call-up to represent Congo DR in 2008. He made his senior international debut in a 1–1 draw with Algeria in Nanterre.

== Career statistics ==
=== Club ===
As of 26 May 2024

Club	Season	League			Cup		Continental		Other		Total	
Club	Season	Division	Apps	Goals	Apps	Goals	Apps	Goals	Apps	Goals	Apps	Goals
PSG B	2006-07	Championnat National 2	19	2	—		—		—		19	2
PSG	2006-07	Ligue 1	—		—		1 (Note: Appearance(s) in UEFA Europa League)	0	1 (Note: Appearance(s) in Coupe de la Ligue)	0	2	0
PSG	2007-08	Ligue 1	1	0	3	0	—		—		4	0
PSG	2008-09	Ligue 1	2	1	—		4	0	1	0	7	1
PSG	Total		3	1	3	0	5	0	2	0	13	1
Nice	2009-10	Ligue 1	19	0	—		—		1	0	20	0
Nice	2010-11	Ligue 1	9	0	2	0	—		1	0	12	0
Nice	2011-12	Ligue 1	8	0	—		—		2	0	10	0
Nice	Total		36	0	2	0	—		4	0	42	0
Karabükspor	2011-12	Süper Lig	14	2	2	0	—		1 (Note: Appearance(s) in Spor Toto Cup)	0	17	2
Karabükspor	2012-13	Süper Lig	29	0	0	0	—		—		29	0
Karabükspor	2013-14	Süper Lig	30	1	2	0	—		—		32	1
Karabükspor	2014-15	Süper Lig	31	0	3	0	4	0	—		38	0
Karabükspor	Total		104	3	7	0	4	0	1	0	116	3
Kayserispor	2015-16	Süper Lig	30	1	4	0	—		—		34	1
Kayserispor	2016-17	Süper Lig	28	3	5	0	—		—		33	3
Kayserispor	Total		58	4	9	0	—		—		67	4
Portland Timbers	2017	MLS	13	0	—		—		1 (Note: Appearance(s) in MLS Cup Playoffs)	0	14	0
Portland Timbers	2018	MLS	31	5	1	0	—		4	0	36	5
Portland Timbers	2019	MLS	22	2	4	0	—		1	0	27	2
Portland Timbers	2020	MLS	17	1	—		—		5 (Note: One appearance in MLS Cup Playoffs, Four appearances in MLS is Back Tournament)	1 (Note: One goal in MLS is Back Tournament)	22	2
Portland Timbers	2021	MLS	26	0	—		4 (Note: Appearance(s) in CONCACAF Champions Cup)	0	4	2	34	2
Portland Timbers	2022	MLS	21	0	0	0	—		—		21	0
Portland Timbers	2023	MLS	21	1	2	0	0	0	—		23	1
Portland Timbers	2024	MLS	1	0	—		—		—		1	0
Portland Timbers	Total		152	9	7	0	4	0	15	3	178	12
Career Total			372	19	28	0	13	0	22	3	435	22

=== International ===
Appearances and goals by national team and year
National team	Year	Apps	Goals
DR Congo	2008	9	0
DR Congo	2009	1	0
DR Congo	2011	1	0
DR Congo	2013	2	0
Total		13	0

== Honours ==
Paris Saint-Germain

- Coupe de la Ligue: 2007–08

Portland Timbers

- MLS is Back Tournament: 2020
