= MLS is Back Tournament =

One-off tournament during the 2020 Major League Soccer season

Tournament details
- Country: United States; Canada
- Cities: Bay Lake, Florida, U.S.
- Venue: ESPN Wide World of Sports Complex
- Dates: July 8 – August 11, 2020
- Teams: 24

Final positions
- Champions: Portland Timbers
- Runners-up: Orlando City SC
- Champions League: Portland Timbers

Tournament statistics
- Matches played: 51
- Goals scored: 146 (2.86 per match)
- Top goal scorer(s): Diego Rossi (7 goals)

Awards
- Best player: Sebastián Blanco

The MLS is Back Tournament took place during the 2020 Major League Soccer season to mark the league's return to action after being suspended as a result of the COVID-19 pandemic. Of the 26 Major League Soccer teams, 24 participated in the tournament; FC Dallas and Nashville SC withdrew after several of their players tested positive for COVID-19 just before their first matches. The tournament was held behind closed doors from July 8 to August 11, 2020, at the ESPN Wide World of Sports Complex in the Walt Disney World Resort in Bay Lake, Florida, near Orlando. The tournament featured a group stage, which was counted toward the 2020 MLS regular season standings, followed by knockout rounds. The tournament champion, Portland Timbers, qualified for the 2021 CONCACAF Champions League, and the 2020 season resumed upon completion of the tournament.

== Background ==
The 2020 Major League Soccer season, the 25th season of the top professional soccer league in the United States and Canada, began on February 29, 2020. On March 12, the season was suspended due to the COVID-19 pandemic in North America, following the cancellation of several matches. At the time of the cancellation, all 26 teams had played two league matches. On March 19, the suspension was extended until May 10, and on April 17, was again extended to June 8. On May 1, the league announced that players were allowed to resume individual outdoor training at MLS facilities on May 6. The COVID-19 pandemic is the first interruption of regular season play since the 2001 season, in which many late regular season games were cancelled due to the September 11 attacks.

Plans to resume the MLS season at a single venue were made by the league in April and May. Among the locations considered were Las Vegas, Vancouver, Los Angeles, and Orlando. The name, "MLS is Back", was reused from a marketing slogan used prior to the season.

== Format ==
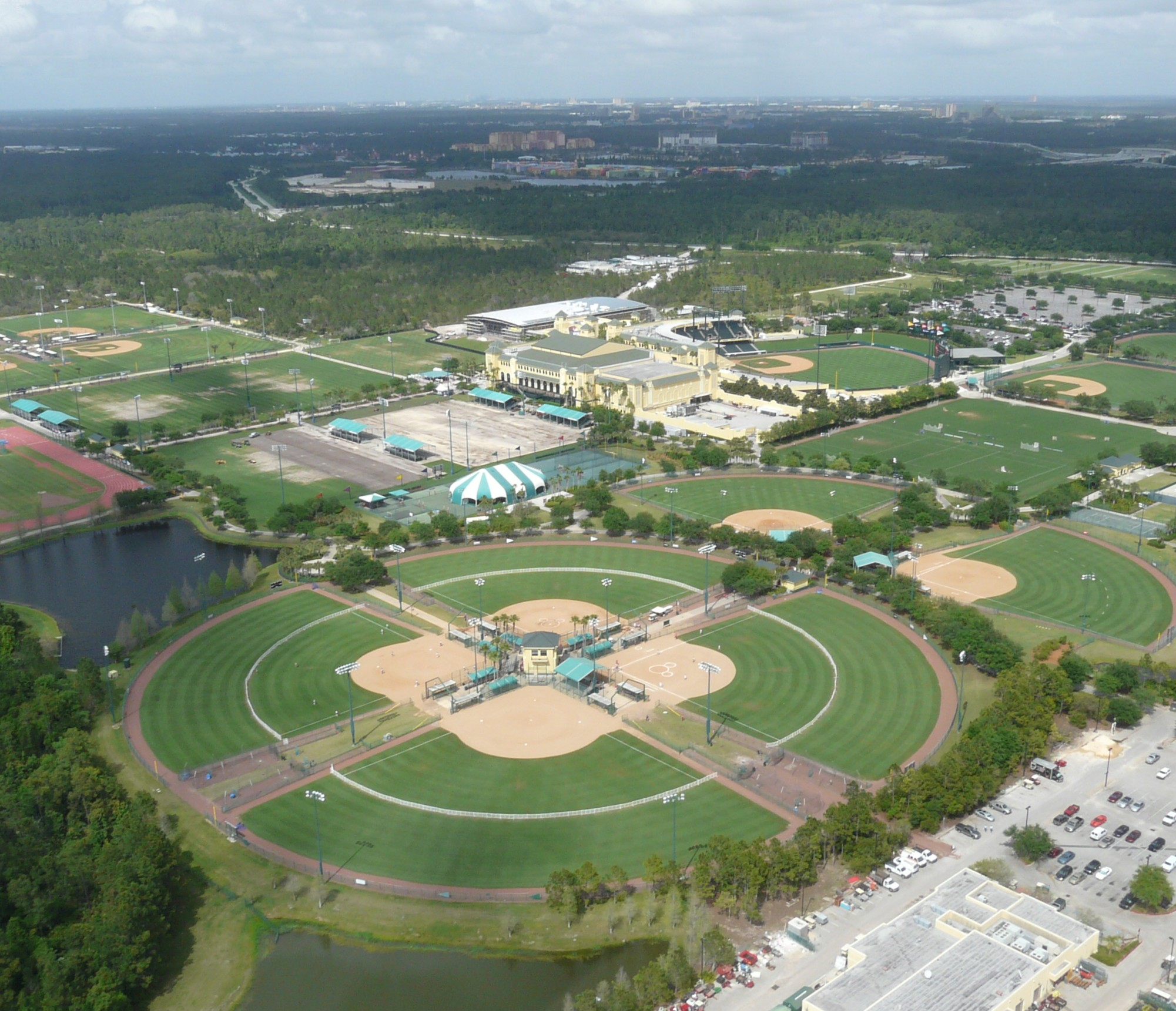
An aerial view of the ESPN Wide World of Sports Complex at Walt Disney World, the site of the MLS is Back Tournament

The tournament was announced by Major League Soccer on June 10, 2020. Teams could begin traveling to Florida on June 24, though they could arrive no later than seven days prior to their first match. The tournament was planned to feature 54 matches (later reduced to 51 following the withdrawal of FC Dallas) played on 26 days, all taking place behind closed doors without spectators at the ESPN Wide World of Sports Complex in Bay Lake, Florida.

The 26 teams were originally split into six groups based on their conference, with one group containing six teams and five containing four teams. Each team would play three group stage matches, and the results would be counted into the 2020 MLS regular season standings. However, following the withdrawal of FC Dallas and Nashville SC from the tournament, a revised structure for the group stage was announced on July 9, 2020. The tournament was split into six groups of four, with Chicago Fire FC moving from Group A to B.

Following the group stage, 16 teams advanced to the knockout stage: the top two teams from each of the six groups and four best third-placed teams. (Note: This was the format initially announced by Major League Soccer. However, on June 24, 2020, it was announced that the third-placed team of the larger Group A would also advance directly, and only three teams would advance (with the fourth-placed team of Group A also eligible to advance). However, the original knockout qualification format was restored on July 9, after the group stage format was revised following the withdrawal of FC Dallas and Nashville SC.) The knockout stage culminated in the tournament final on August 11. If a knockout match was tied at the end of regulation, a penalty shoot-out was used to determine the winner (no extra time was played).

During the tournament, teams were allowed to name a maximum of twelve substitutes, an increase from the MLS rule of seven. Additionally, teams were allowed to make up to five substitutions in a match, following a temporary amendment to the Laws of the Game by IFAB in order to lessen the impact of fixture congestion caused by the pandemic. However, each team was given only three opportunities to make substitutions, excluding those made at halftime.

The MLS is Back Tournament champions qualified for the 2021 CONCACAF Champions League. As a one-time change, this berth replaced the one normally awarded to the regular season conference champion that did not win the Supporters' Shield. The berth was awarded regardless of whether the champion was from the United States or Canada. Were the winners from Canada, they would still have participated in the 2020 Canadian Championship. The tournament also featured a $1.1 million prize pool for players to earn additional bonuses.

Following the tournament, the MLS regular season resumed with a revised schedule, which concluded with the playoffs and MLS Cup 2020. The MLS is Back tournament in itself became a contingency plan for the MLS in the event of a future pandemic or major disease outbreak.

== Medical protocol ==
Major League Soccer announced a medical protocol, in consultation with experts, to be used for the tournament to ensure the health and safety of players, coaches, officials, and staff. This included testing for COVID-19 prior to and throughout the tournament, wearing a face covering or mask, and social distancing to prevent an outbreak of COVID-19 from occurring. Players and staff who were deemed "high-risk individuals" were not permitted to attend the tournament unless medically cleared. Had anyone tested positive for COVID-19, they were required to isolate under a strict and detailed protocol to prevent transmission.

Prior to travelling to Orlando, all players, coaches, referees, club personnel and league staff were required to complete two Polymerase Chain Reaction (PCR) tests 24 hours apart and 72 hours before travelling to the ESPN Wide World of Sports Complex. Upon arrival, all individuals were required to take another PCR test and are quarantined until the results of the tests arrive. All individuals who tested positive underwent a clinical assessment by a healthcare provider and moved to an isolation area of the hotel until they were medically cleared.

Major League Soccer started producing updates on the testing results of the PCR tests performed in Orlando on June 28. Up to that point, 329 individuals were tested for COVID-19, and two players tested positive, both of whom had just arrived at the facility. Within the next two days, 392 more individuals were tested, of which four of them tested positive. FC Dallas then provided an update on July 1 confirming that six of their players had tested positive for COVID-19, and the rest of their delegation had been quarantined in their hotel rooms pending the results of additional testing. From July 1 to 2, 855 individuals were tested, six of whom were tested positive for COVID-19, four of which were players. From July 3 to 4, two more players tested positive for COVID-19. Between July 7 and 8, Major League Soccer reported that four individuals tested positive for COVID-19, out of 1888 individuals tested.

On July 6, 2020, FC Dallas withdrew from the tournament due to ten players and one staff member of the club testing positive for COVID-19, after their opening match was initially postponed. On July 9, 2020, Nashville SC were also withdrawn from the tournament after nine players of the club tested positive for the virus, after their opening match was initially postponed.

On July 12, the match between Toronto FC and D.C. United was postponed just minutes prior to kickoff after at least one player tested positive for COVID-19. The game was rescheduled for the following day on July 13, while the two players who received the positive and inconclusive test were both medically cleared to resume activities. Meanwhile, on July 14, Major League Soccer announced that there were no individuals who were tested positive out of the teams still participating in the tournament, while there was a single positive case out of the two teams that had withdrawn from the tournament. From July 16 onward, the MLS did not record a single positive test of COVID-19 within the delegation staying at the complex.

== Schedule ==
The schedule of the competition was as follows. Up to three matches took place each day during the group stage, with kick-off times at 9 a.m., 8 p.m., and 10:30 p.m. EDT (UTC−4) due to the Florida climate. Only one pair of matches overlapped during the tournament: Sporting Kansas City vs Colorado Rapids occurred simultaneously to D.C. United vs New England Revolution on adjacent fields on July 17, due to the latter match being rescheduled from an earlier date. The full match schedule for the tournament was announced on June 24, 2020.

Phase	Round	Match dates
Group stage	Matchday 1	July 8 – July 13, 2020
Group stage	Matchday 2	July 14 – July 18, 2020
Group stage	Matchday 3	July 19 – July 23, 2020
Knockout stage	Round of 16	July 25 – July 28, 2020
Knockout stage	Quarter-finals	July 30 – August 1, 2020
Knockout stage	Semi-finals	August 5 – August 6, 2020
Knockout stage	Final	August 11, 2020

== Draw ==
The draw for the group stage took place on June 11, 2020, at 3:30 p.m. EDT (UTC−4), hosted by Charlie Davies and Susannah Collins. The 26 teams were drawn into six groups based on their conference. To allow for an even number of teams in each group for the tournament, Nashville SC was moved from the Western Conference to the Eastern Conference for the remainder of the 2020 season. The fourteen teams of the Eastern Conference were drawn into one group of six teams (Group A) and two groups of four teams (Groups C and E). The twelve teams of the Western Conference were drawn into three groups of four teams (Group B, D, and F).

Three teams from each conference were seeded and drawn into separate groups. Orlando City SC was considered the "host" of the tournament and was therefore seeded and automatically assigned to Group A. The remaining five seeds were determined based on results from the 2019 season. Inter Miami CF was automatically assigned to Group A in order to face rival Florida club Orlando City SC in the opening match of the competition.

Pot	Eastern Conference	Western Conference
Seeded	Orlando City SC (Note: Orlando City SC, designated as the tournament hosts, was seeded and automatically assigned to position A1.); Atlanta United FC (Note: Seeded as a semi-finalist in the 2019 MLS Cup Playoffs.); Toronto FC	Los Angeles FC; Seattle Sounders FC; Real Salt Lake (Note: Seeded as the next highest-ranked team in the 2019 season Western Conference.)
Unseeded	Chicago Fire FC; FC Cincinnati; Columbus Crew SC; D.C. United; Inter Miami CF (Note: Inter Miami CF was automatically assigned to position A2 in order to face fellow Florida club Orlando City SC in the opening match of the tournament.); Montreal Impact; Nashville SC (Note: Nashville SC was moved from the Western Conference to the Eastern Conference for the remainder of the 2020 season.); New England Revolution; New York City FC; New York Red Bulls; Philadelphia Union	Colorado Rapids; FC Dallas; Houston Dynamo FC; LA Galaxy; Minnesota United FC; Portland Timbers; San Jose Earthquakes; Sporting Kansas City; Vancouver Whitecaps FC

The seeded teams were drawn first and allocated to position 1 of the first available group. The unseeded teams were subsequently drawn, with the representatives of the six seeded teams, in rotation, choosing a numbered ball to occupy the next available position in their group until all the groups were completed. The draw resulted in the following groups:

Group A (East)
Pos	Team
A1	Orlando City SC
A2	Inter Miami CF
A3	New York City FC
A4	Philadelphia Union
A5	Chicago Fire FC (Note: Chicago Fire was later moved to Group B following the withdrawal of FC Dallas and Nashville SC.)
A6	~~Nashville SC~~ (Note: Withdrawn from the tournament)

Group B (West)
Pos	Team
B1	Seattle Sounders FC
B2	~~FC Dallas~~
B3	Vancouver Whitecaps FC
B4	San Jose Earthquakes

Group C (East)
Pos	Team
C1	Toronto FC
C2	New England Revolution
C3	Montreal Impact
C4	D.C. United

Group D (West)
Pos	Team
D1	Real Salt Lake
D2	Sporting Kansas City
D3	Colorado Rapids
D4	Minnesota United FC

Group E (East)
Pos	Team
E1	Atlanta United FC
E2	FC Cincinnati
E3	New York Red Bulls
E4	Columbus Crew SC

Group F (West)
Pos	Team
F1	Los Angeles FC
F2	LA Galaxy
F3	Houston Dynamo FC
F4	Portland Timbers

Originally, the teams in Group A were scheduled to only face three out of the five teams within their group. However, after the group stage format was revised, all teams faced each other. The following were the initial pairings set prior to the draw:

Original Group A fixtures
Team	Opponents
A1 (Orlando City SC)	A2, A3, A6
A2 (Inter Miami CF)	A1, A4, A5
A3 (New York City FC)	A1, A4, A5
A4 (Philadelphia Union)	A2, A3, A6
A5 (Chicago Fire FC)	A2, A3, A6
A6 (Nashville SC)	A1, A4, A5

On July 9, 2020, following the withdrawal of FC Dallas and Nashville SC, Major League Soccer announced that Chicago Fire FC would move from Group A to B, with Group A therefore becoming a four-team group. As a result, Chicago Fire was the only Eastern Conference team in an otherwise Western Conference group.

== Group stage ==
The results of all the games in this stage were counted for points toward the 2020 regular season standings.

=== Tiebreakers ===
The ranking of teams in the group stage was determined as follows:

1. Higher number of points obtained in all group matches;
2. Higher number of wins in all group matches;
3. Superior goal difference in all group matches;
4. Higher number of goals scored in all group matches;
5. Lower disciplinary points total in all group matches:
  - Foul: 1 point;
  - Yellow card: 3 points;
  - Indirect red card (second yellow card): 7 points;
  - Direct red card: 7 points;
  - Coach dismissal: 7 points;
  - Any supplemental discipline: 8 points;
6. Coin toss (tie of two teams) or drawing of lots (tie of three or more teams).

=== Group A ===
Group A results
Pos	Team	Pld	W	D	L	GF	GA	GD	Pts	Qualification
1	Orlando City SC (H)	3	2	1	0	6	3	+3	7	Advanced to knockout stage
2	Philadelphia Union	3	2	1	0	4	2	+2	7	Advanced to knockout stage
3	New York City FC	3	1	0	2	2	4	−2	3	Advanced to knockout stage
4	Inter Miami CF	3	0	0	3	2	5	−3	0	

Source: MLS
(H) Hosts
July 8, 2020
8:00 p.m. EDT

Orlando City SC	2–1	Inter Miami CF
Mueller 70'; Nani 90+7'	Report	Agudelo 47'

Referee: Rubiel Vazquez
July 9, 2020
9:00 a.m. EDT

New York City FC	0–1	Philadelphia Union
	Report	Bedoya 63'

Referee: Armando Villarreal

July 14, 2020
8:00 p.m. EDT

New York City FC	1–3	Orlando City SC
Medina 38'	Report	Mueller 4', 10'; Akindele 81'

Referee: Robert Sibiga
July 14, 2020
10:30 p.m. EDT

Philadelphia Union	2–1	Inter Miami CF
Wagner 5'; Przybyłko 63'	Report	Pizarro 36'

Referee: Silviu Petrescu

July 20, 2020
9:00 a.m. EDT

Inter Miami CF	0–1	New York City FC
	Report	Tajouri-Shradi 64'

Referee: Rosendo Mendoza
July 20, 2020
8:00 p.m. EDT

Philadelphia Union	1–1	Orlando City SC
Ilsinho 68'	Report	Pereyra 70'

Referee: Rubiel Vazquez

=== Group B ===
Group B results
Pos	Team	Pld	W	D	L	GF	GA	GD	Pts	Qualification
1	San Jose Earthquakes	3	2	1	0	6	3	+3	7	Advanced to knockout stage
2	Seattle Sounders FC	3	1	1	1	4	2	+2	4	Advanced to knockout stage
3	Vancouver Whitecaps FC	3	1	0	2	5	7	−2	3	Advanced to knockout stage
4	Chicago Fire	3	1	0	2	2	5	−3	3	

Source: MLS
July 10, 2020
9:00 p.m. EDT (Note: Following the initial delay of the Toronto FC and D.C. United match, the group stage match between San Jose Earthquakes and Seattle Sounders FC, originally scheduled for July 10, 2020, 10:30 p.m. EDT, was moved to 9:00 p.m. EDT.)

Seattle Sounders FC	0–0	San Jose Earthquakes
	Report

Referee: Drew Fischer

July 14, 2020
9:00 a.m. EDT

Chicago Fire FC	2–1	Seattle Sounders FC
Berić 52'; Pineda 84'	Report	Bwana 77'

Referee: Rosendo Mendoza
July 15, 2020
9:00 p.m. EDT (Note: The group stage match between Toronto FC and D.C. United, originally scheduled for July 10, 2020, 8:00 p.m. EDT, was rescheduled to July 12, 9:00 a.m. EDT, due to Toronto FC's delayed arrival in Florida. The match was later rescheduled to the July 13, 2020, after an unconfirmed positive COVID-19 test for one player and an inconclusive test for another player among the teams. As a result, three other group stage fixtures were rescheduled. The match between Montreal Impact and Toronto FC, originally scheduled for July 15, 2020, 8:00 p.m. EDT, was rescheduled to July 16. The match between D.C. United and New England Revolution, originally scheduled for July 16, 2020, 8:00 p.m. EDT, was rescheduled to July 17. The match between Vancouver Whitecaps FC and San Jose Earthquakes, originally scheduled for July 15, 2020, 10:30 p.m. EDT, was moved to 9:00 p.m. EDT.)

Vancouver Whitecaps FC	3–4	San Jose Earthquakes
Adnan 7'; Judson 22' (o.g.); Dájome 59'	Report	Ríos 45+2'; Wondolowski 72'; Alanís 81'; Salinas 90+8'

Referee: Marcos de Oliveira

July 19, 2020
8:00 p.m. EDT

Chicago Fire FC	0–2	San Jose Earthquakes
	Report	Espinoza 56'; Wondolowski 83'

Referee: Ramy Touchan
July 19, 2020 (Note: The group stage match between Seattle Sounders FC and Vancouver Whitecaps FC, originally scheduled for July 20, 2020, 10:30 p.m. EDT, was rescheduled to July 19.)
10:30 p.m. EDT

Seattle Sounders FC	3–0	Vancouver Whitecaps FC
Lodeiro 16' (pen.); Morris 34'; Ruidíaz 51'	Report

Referee: Robert Sibiga

July 23, 2020
9:00 a.m. EDT

Chicago Fire FC	0–2	Vancouver Whitecaps FC
	Report	Reyna 65'; Dájome 71'

Referee: Armando Villarreal

=== Group C ===
Group C results
Pos	Team	Pld	W	D	L	GF	GA	GD	Pts	Qualification
1	Toronto FC	3	1	2	0	6	5	+1	5	Advanced to knockout stage
2	New England Revolution	3	1	2	0	2	1	+1	5	Advanced to knockout stage
3	Montreal Impact	3	1	0	2	4	5	−1	3	Advanced to knockout stage
4	D.C. United	3	0	2	1	3	4	−1	2	

Source: MLS
July 9, 2020
8:00 p.m. EDT

Montreal Impact	0–1	New England Revolution
	Report	Bou 56'

Referee: Guido Gonzales Jr.
July 13, 2020
9:00 a.m. EDT

Toronto FC	2–2	D.C. United
Akinola 12', 44'	Report	Higuaín 84'; Brillant 90+1'

Referee: Fotis Bazakos

July 16, 2020
8:00 p.m. EDT

Montreal Impact	3–4	Toronto FC
Quioto 14'; Taïder 37' (pen.), 90+5' (pen.)	Report	Laryea 8'; Akinola 25', 37', 83'

Referee: Jair Marrufo
July 17, 2020
8:00 p.m. EDT

D.C. United	1–1	New England Revolution
Higuaín 72'	Report	Buksa 51'

Referee: Joe Dickerson

July 21, 2020
9:00 a.m. EDT

Toronto FC	0–0	New England Revolution
	Report

Referee: Jair Marrufo
July 21, 2020
10:30 p.m. EDT

Montreal Impact	1–0	D.C. United
Taïder 31'	Report

Referee: Alex Chilowicz

=== Group D ===
Group D results
Pos	Team	Pld	W	D	L	GF	GA	GD	Pts	Qualification
1	Sporting Kansas City	3	2	0	1	6	4	+2	6	Advanced to knockout stage
2	Minnesota United FC	3	1	2	0	4	3	+1	5	Advanced to knockout stage
3	Real Salt Lake	3	1	1	1	2	2	0	4	Advanced to knockout stage
4	Colorado Rapids	3	0	1	2	4	7	−3	1	

Source: MLS
July 12, 2020
8:00 p.m. EDT

Sporting Kansas City	1–2	Minnesota United FC
Shelton 43'	Report	Shelton 90+2' (o.g.); Molino 90+7'

Referee: Joe Dickerson
July 12, 2020
10:30 p.m. EDT

Real Salt Lake	2–0	Colorado Rapids
Rusnák 27'; Kreilach 76'	Report

Referee: Jair Marrufo

July 17, 2020
8:00 p.m. EDT

Sporting Kansas City	3–2	Colorado Rapids
Shelton 65'; Pulido 72' (pen.); Zusi 90+1'	Report	Acosta 6'; Lewis 84'

Referee: David Gantar
July 17, 2020
10:30 p.m. EDT

Real Salt Lake	0–0	Minnesota United FC
	Report

Referee: Alex Chilowicz

July 22, 2020
9:00 a.m. EDT

Real Salt Lake	0–2	Sporting Kansas City
	Report	Russell 1'; Gerso 86'

Referee: Fotis Bazakos
July 22, 2020
10:30 p.m. EDT

Colorado Rapids	2–2	Minnesota United FC
Kamara 19'; Lewis 59'	Report	Finlay 36', 43'

Referee: Guido Gonzales Jr.

=== Group E ===
Group E results
Pos	Team	Pld	W	D	L	GF	GA	GD	Pts	Qualification
1	Columbus Crew SC	3	3	0	0	7	0	+7	9	Advanced to knockout stage
2	FC Cincinnati	3	2	0	1	3	4	−1	6	Advanced to knockout stage
3	New York Red Bulls	3	1	0	2	1	4	−3	3	
4	Atlanta United	3	0	0	3	0	3	−3	0	

Source: MLS
July 11, 2020
8:45 p.m. EDT (Note: The group stage match between Atlanta United FC and New York Red Bulls, originally scheduled for July 11, 2020, 8:00 p.m. EDT, was delayed to 8:45 p.m. EDT due to inclement weather. As a result, the match between FC Cincinnati and Columbus Crew SC later that same day, originally scheduled for 10:30 p.m. EDT, was delayed to 11:20 p.m. EDT to prevent the matches from overlapping.)

Atlanta United FC	0–1	New York Red Bulls
	Report	Valot 4'

Referee: Allen Chapman
July 11, 2020
11:20 p.m. EDT

FC Cincinnati	0–4	Columbus Crew SC
	Report	Zelarayán 27'; Zardes 30', 49'; Mokhtar 60'

Referee: Ismail Elfath

July 16, 2020
9:00 a.m. EDT

Atlanta United FC	0–1	FC Cincinnati
	Report	Amaya 76'

Referee: Victor Rivas
July 16, 2020
10:30 p.m. EDT

Columbus Crew SC	2–0	New York Red Bulls
Zardes 22'; Zelarayán 47'	Report

Referee: Ramy Touchan

July 21, 2020
8:00 p.m. EDT

Atlanta United FC	0–1	Columbus Crew SC
	Report	Mokhtar 18'

Referee: Tim Ford
July 22, 2020
8:00 p.m. EDT

FC Cincinnati	2–0	New York Red Bulls
Kubo 43'; Valot 56' (o.g.)	Report

Referee: Marcos de Oliveira

=== Group F ===
Group F results
Pos	Team	Pld	W	D	L	GF	GA	GD	Pts	Qualification
1	Portland Timbers	3	2	1	0	6	4	+2	7	Advanced to knockout stage
2	Los Angeles FC	3	1	2	0	11	7	+4	5	Advanced to knockout stage
3	Houston Dynamo	3	0	2	1	5	6	−1	2	
4	LA Galaxy	3	0	1	2	4	9	−5	1	

Source: MLS
July 13, 2020
8:00 p.m. EDT

Los Angeles FC	3–3	Houston Dynamo FC
Wright-Phillips 19'; Rossi 63'; B. Rodríguez 69'	Report	M. Rodríguez 8', 30'; Elis 45+5'

Referee: Tim Ford
July 13, 2020
10:30 p.m. EDT

LA Galaxy	1–2	Portland Timbers
Chicharito 88'	Report	Ebobisse 59'; Blanco 66'

Referee: Ramy Touchan

July 18, 2020
8:00 p.m. EDT

Portland Timbers	2–1	Houston Dynamo FC
Ebobisse 35'; Valeri 61'	Report	Elis 86' (pen.)

Referee: Ismail Elfath
July 18, 2020
10:30 p.m. EDT

Los Angeles FC	6–2	LA Galaxy
Rossi 13' (pen.), 45+2', 75', 90+2'; Wright-Phillips 56'; El Monir 80'	Report	Blessing 5' (o.g.); Pavón 31' (pen.)

Referee: Allen Chapman

July 23, 2020
8:00 p.m. EDT

LA Galaxy	1–1	Houston Dynamo FC
Pavón 90+1' (pen.)	Report	Quintero 17'

Referee: Victor Rivas
July 23, 2020
10:30 p.m. EDT

Los Angeles FC	2–2	Portland Timbers
Wright-Phillips 36'; Kaye 40'	Report	Niezgoda 7'; Ebobisse 81'

Referee: Drew Fischer

=== Ranking of third-placed teams ===
The results of the third-placed teams from the six groups were compared against each other. The top four teams of this ranking advanced to the round of 16.

3rd place ranking
Pos	Grp	Team	Pld	W	D	L	GF	GA	GD	Pts	Qualification
1	D	Real Salt Lake	3	1	1	1	2	2	0	4	Advanced to knockout stage
2	C	Montreal Impact	3	1	0	2	4	5	−1	3	Advanced to knockout stage
3	B	Vancouver Whitecaps FC	3	1	0	2	5	7	−2	3	Advanced to knockout stage
4	A	New York City FC	3	1	0	2	2	4	−2	3	Advanced to knockout stage
5	E	New York Red Bulls	3	1	0	2	1	4	−3	3	
6	F	Houston Dynamo	3	0	2	1	5	6	−1	2	

Source: MLS
Rules for classification: 1) Points; 2) Goal differential; 3) Goals scored; 4) Fewest disciplinary points

== Knockout stage ==
In this stage, if a match was tied at the end of 90 minutes of normal playing time, a penalty shoot-out was used to determine the winners.

=== Bracket ===
Round of 16
July 25
Philadelphia Union	1
New England Revolution	0
July 26
Sporting Kansas City	0 (3)
Vancouver Whitecaps FC	0 (1)
July 26
Toronto FC	1
New York City FC	3
July 28
Portland Timbers	1 (4)
FC Cincinnati	1 (2)
July 25
Orlando City SC	1
Montreal Impact	0
July 27
Seattle Sounders FC	1
Los Angeles FC	4
July 27
San Jose Earthquakes	5
Real Salt Lake	2
July 28
Columbus Crew SC	1 (3)
Minnesota United FC	1 (5)

Quarter-finals
July 30
Philadelphia Union	3
Sporting Kansas City	1
August 1
New York City FC	1
Portland Timbers	3
July 31
Orlando City SC	1 (5)
Los Angeles FC	1 (4)
August 1
San Jose Earthquakes	1
Minnesota United FC	4

Semi-finals
August 5
Philadelphia Union	1
Portland Timbers	2
August 6
Orlando City SC	3
Minnesota United FC	1

Final
August 11
Portland Timbers	2
Orlando City SC	1

=== Round of 16 ===
July 25, 2020
8:00 p.m. EDT

Orlando City SC	1–0	Montreal Impact
Akindele 60'	Report

Referee: Marcos de Oliveira

July 25, 2020
10:30 p.m. EDT

Philadelphia Union	1–0	New England Revolution
Santos 63'	Report

Referee: Ismail Elfath

July 26, 2020 (Note: The match was moved from July 27 to 26.)
8:30 p.m. EDT

Toronto FC	1–3	New York City FC
Mullins 87'	Report	Medina 5'; Castellanos 55'; Moralez 81'

Referee: Alex Chilowicz

July 26, 2020
11:00 p.m. EDT

Sporting Kansas City	0–0	Vancouver Whitecaps FC
	Report
Penalties
Pulido (penalty scored); Ilie (penalty scored); Sallói (penalty missed); Busio (penalty scored)	3–1	(penalty missed) Dájome; (penalty scored) Owusu; (penalty missed) Cornelius; (penalty missed) Reyna

Referee: Victor Rivas

July 27, 2020 (Note: The match was moved from July 26 to 27.)
8:30 p.m. EDT

San Jose Earthquakes	5–2	Real Salt Lake
Espinoza 21'; Eriksson 49' (pen.), 90+6' (pen.); Vako 61'; Wondolowski 86'	Report	Martínez 22'; Kreilach 75'

Referee: Drew Fischer

July 27, 2020
11:00 p.m. EDT

Seattle Sounders FC	1–4	Los Angeles FC
Bruin 75'	Report	Rossi 14' (pen.), 82'; Blessing 39'; Rodríguez 89'

Referee: Jair Marrufo

July 28, 2020
8:00 p.m. EDT

Columbus Crew SC	1–1	Minnesota United FC
Zardes 79'	Report	Lod 18'
Penalties
Adi (penalty scored); Pedro Santos (penalty scored); Cadden (penalty missed); Zelarayán (penalty scored)	3–5	(penalty scored) Alonso; (penalty scored) Greguš; (penalty scored) Schoenfeld; (penalty scored) Edwards; (penalty scored) Gasper

Referee: Allen Chapman

July 28, 2020
10:30 p.m. EDT

Portland Timbers	1–1	FC Cincinnati
Niezgoda 67'	Report	Locadia 81' (pen.)
Penalties
Valeri (penalty scored); Mora (penalty scored); Blanco (penalty scored); Niezgoda (penalty scored)	4–2	(penalty scored) De Jong; (penalty scored) Cruz; (penalty missed) Locadia; (penalty missed) Waston

Referee: Armando Villarreal

=== Quarter-finals ===
July 30, 2020
8:00 p.m. EDT

Philadelphia Union	3–1	Sporting Kansas City
Monteiro 24'; Santos 26', 39'	Report	Pulido 45+1'

Referee: Ramy Touchan

July 31, 2020
7:30 p.m. EDT

Orlando City SC	1–1	Los Angeles FC
Moutinho 90'	Report	Wright-Phillips 60'
Penalties
Pereyra (penalty scored); Smith (penalty scored); Moutinho (penalty scored); Carlos (penalty scored); Nani (penalty scored)	5–4	(penalty scored) Ginella; (penalty missed) Harvey; (penalty scored) Rossi; (penalty scored) Rodríguez; (penalty scored) Blessing

Referee: Joe Dickerson

August 1, 2020
8:00 p.m. EDT

San Jose Earthquakes	1–4	Minnesota United FC
Eriksson 50' (pen.)	Report	Lod 20'; Hayes 21'; Amarilla 56'; Hairston 86'

Referee: Jair Marrufo

August 1, 2020
10:30 p.m. EDT

New York City FC	1–3	Portland Timbers
Medina 27' (pen.)	Report	Blanco 43'; Valeri 65'; Polo 76'

Referee: Allen Chapman

=== Semi-finals ===
August 5, 2020
8:00 p.m. EDT

Philadelphia Union	1–2	Portland Timbers
Wooten 85'	Report	Ebobisse 13'; Blanco 70'

Referee: Allen Chapman

August 6, 2020
9:14 p.m. EDT

Orlando City SC	3–1	Minnesota United FC
Nani 36', 42'; Michel 90+6'	Report	Toye 83'

Referee: Drew Fischer

=== Final ===
August 11, 2020
8:30 p.m. EDT

Portland Timbers	2–1	Orlando City SC
Mabiala 27'; Župarić 66'	Report	Pereyra 39'

ESPN Wide World of Sports Complex, Bay Lake, Florida
Attendance: 0 (behind closed doors)
Referee: Ismail Elfath

== Statistics ==
=== Top scorers ===
Rank	Player	Club	Goals
1	(Uruguay) Diego Rossi	Los Angeles FC	7
2	(Canada) Ayo Akinola	Toronto FC	5
3	(United States) Jeremy Ebobisse	Portland Timbers	4
3	(England) Bradley Wright-Phillips	Los Angeles FC	4
3	(United States) Gyasi Zardes	Columbus Crew SC	4
6	(Argentina) Sebastián Blanco	Portland Timbers	3
6	(Sweden) Magnus Eriksson	San Jose Earthquakes	3
6	(Paraguay) Jesús Medina	New York City FC	3
6	(United States) Chris Mueller	Orlando City SC	3
6	(Portugal) Nani	Orlando City SC	3
6	(Brazil) Sérgio Santos	Philadelphia Union	3
6	(Algeria) Saphir Taïder	Montreal Impact	3
6	(United States) Chris Wondolowski	San Jose Earthquakes	3

=== Top assists ===
Rank	Player	Club	Assists
1	(Argentina) Sebastián Blanco	Portland Timbers	5
1	(Spain) Alejandro Pozuelo	Toronto FC	5
3	(Portugal) Nani	Orlando City SC	3
3	(Mexico) Alan Pulido	Sporting Kansas City	3
3	(Uruguay) Brian Rodríguez	Los Angeles FC	3
3	(Argentina) Diego Valeri	Portland Timbers	3
7	(United States) Brenden Aaronson	Philadelphia Union	2
7	(Uruguay) José Aja	Minnesota United FC	2
7	(United States) Corey Baird	Real Salt Lake	2
7	(United States) Alejandro Bedoya	Philadelphia Union	2
7	(Brazil) Felipe	D.C. United	2
7	(Uruguay) Francisco Ginella	Los Angeles FC	2
7	(Brazil) Héber	New York City FC	2
7	(Madagascar) Romain Métanire	Minnesota United FC	2
7	(United States) Jordan Morris	Seattle Sounders FC	2
7	(Argentina) Matías Pellegrini	Inter Miami CF	2
7	(Argentina) Lucas Zelarayán	Columbus Crew SC	2

=== Shutouts ===
Rank	Player	Club	Shutouts
1	(Jamaica) Andre Blake	Philadelphia Union	2
1	(Switzerland) Stefan Frei	Seattle Sounders FC	2
1	(Canada) Thomas Hasal	Vancouver Whitecaps FC	2
1	(United States) Zac MacMath	Real Salt Lake	2
1	(United States) Tim Melia	Sporting Kansas City	2
1	(Curaçao) Eloy Room	Columbus Crew SC	2
1	(United States) Matt Turner	New England Revolution	2
1	(Poland) Przemysław Tytoń	FC Cincinnati	2
1	(Argentina) Daniel Vega	San Jose Earthquakes	2
10	(United States) Alex Bono	Toronto FC	1
10	(Senegal) Clément Diop	Montreal Impact	1
10	(Peru) Pedro Gallese	Orlando City SC	1
10	(Denmark) David Jensen	New York Red Bulls	1
10	(United States) Sean Johnson	New York City FC	1
10	(United States) Tyler Miller	Minnesota United FC	1
10	(United States) Andrew Tarbell	Columbus Crew SC	1

== Awards ==
=== Individual awards ===
The following awards were given at the conclusion of the tournament:

- Player of the Tournament: (Argentina) Sebastián Blanco (Portland Timbers)
- Golden Boot: (Uruguay) Diego Rossi (Los Angeles FC)
- Golden Glove: (Jamaica) Andre Blake (Philadelphia Union)
- Young Player of the Tournament: (Uruguay) Diego Rossi (Los Angeles FC)
- Goal of the Tournament: (Peru) Andy Polo (Portland Timbers)
- Save of the Tournament: (United States) Steve Clark (Portland Timbers)

The Golden Boot was given to the top scorer of the tournament. If multiple players had been level on goals scored, the first tiebreaker for the award would have been assists. Audi donated $10,000 to the academy of the winning player's club. The Player of the Tournament, Golden Glove, and Young Player of the Tournament were given out based on voting from the media (75%) and fans (25%). The Goal and Save of the Tournament were determined by the editorial team of MLSsoccer.com shortlisting eight candidates, with the final result chosen by online fan voting.

=== MLS is Back Tournament Best XI ===
The media chose the best eleven players of the tournament in a 4–3–3 formation.

Goalkeeper	Defenders	Midfielders	Forwards	Ref.
(Jamaica) Andre Blake	(Portugal) João Moutinho; (United States) Mark McKenzie; (Democratic Republic of the Congo) Larrys Mabiala; (Brazil) Ruan	(Colombia) Diego Chará; (Argentina) Sebastián Blanco; (United States) Brenden Aaronson	(Portugal) Nani; (United States) Jeremy Ebobisse; (Uruguay) Diego Rossi	

=== Man of the Match ===
The Man of the Match was named after each match by the editorial team of MLSsoccer.com.

Match	Player	Club	Opponent	Ref.
1	(Portugal) Nani	Orlando City SC	Inter Miami CF	
2	(Jamaica) Andre Blake	Philadelphia Union	New York City FC	
3	(Argentina) Gustavo Bou	New England Revolution	Montreal Impact	
4	(Switzerland) Stefan Frei	Seattle Sounders FC	San Jose Earthquakes	
5	(France) Florian Valot	New York Red Bulls	Atlanta United FC	
6	(Argentina) Lucas Zelarayán	Columbus Crew SC	FC Cincinnati	
7	(Trinidad and Tobago) Kevin Molino	Minnesota United FC	Sporting Kansas City	
8	(Brazil) Everton Luiz	Real Salt Lake	Colorado Rapids	
9	(Spain) Alejandro Pozuelo	Toronto FC	D.C. United	
10	(United States) Memo Rodríguez	Houston Dynamo FC	Los Angeles FC	
11	(Argentina) Sebastián Blanco	Portland Timbers	LA Galaxy	
12	(United States) Mauricio Pineda	Chicago Fire FC	Seattle Sounders FC	
13	(United States) Chris Mueller	Orlando City SC	New York City FC	
14	(United States) Brenden Aaronson	Philadelphia Union	Inter Miami CF	
15	(United States) Shea Salinas	San Jose Earthquakes	Vancouver Whitecaps FC	
16	(United States) Frankie Amaya	FC Cincinnati	Atlanta United FC	
17	(Canada) Ayo Akinola	Toronto FC	Montreal Impact	
18	(United States) Gyasi Zardes	Columbus Crew SC	New York Red Bulls	
19	(Poland) Adam Buksa	New England Revolution	D.C. United	
20	(United States) Khiry Shelton	Sporting Kansas City	Colorado Rapids	
21	(United States) Zac MacMath	Real Salt Lake	Minnesota United FC	
22	(Democratic Republic of the Congo) Larrys Mabiala	Portland Timbers	Houston Dynamo FC	
23	(Uruguay) Diego Rossi	Los Angeles FC	LA Galaxy	
24	(United States) Jackson Yueill	San Jose Earthquakes	Chicago Fire FC	
25	(United States) Jordan Morris	Seattle Sounders FC	Vancouver Whitecaps FC	
26	(Libya) Ismael Tajouri-Shradi	New York City FC	Inter Miami CF	
27	(Jamaica) Andre Blake	Philadelphia Union	Orlando City SC	
28	(United States) Matt Turner	New England Revolution	Toronto FC	
29	(United States) Darlington Nagbe	Columbus Crew SC	Atlanta United FC	
30	(Senegal) Clément Diop	Montreal Impact	D.C. United	
31	(Scotland) Johnny Russell	Sporting Kansas City	Real Salt Lake	
32	(Japan) Yuya Kubo	FC Cincinnati	New York Red Bulls	
33	(United States) Ethan Finlay	Minnesota United FC	Colorado Rapids	
34	(Peru) Yordy Reyna	Vancouver Whitecaps FC	Chicago Fire FC	
35	(Argentina) Cristian Pavón	LA Galaxy	Houston Dynamo FC	
36	(United States) Jeremy Ebobisse	Portland Timbers	Los Angeles FC	
37	(Ecuador) Jhegson Méndez	Orlando City SC	Montreal Impact	
38	(Brazil) Sérgio Santos	Philadelphia Union	New England Revolution	
39	(Argentina) Maximiliano Moralez	New York City FC	Toronto FC	
40	(Canada) Thomas Hasal	Vancouver Whitecaps FC	Sporting Kansas City	
41	(Argentina) Cristian Espinoza	San Jose Earthquakes	Real Salt Lake	
42	(Uruguay) Diego Rossi	Los Angeles FC	Seattle Sounders FC	
43	(United States) Tyler Miller	Minnesota United FC	Columbus Crew SC	
44	(Poland) Przemysław Tytoń	FC Cincinnati	Portland Timbers	
45	(Brazil) Sérgio Santos	Philadelphia Union	Sporting Kansas City	
46	(Portugal) João Moutinho	Orlando City SC	Los Angeles FC	
47	(United States) Hassani Dotson	Minnesota United FC	San Jose Earthquakes	
48	(Argentina) Sebastián Blanco	Portland Timbers	New York City FC	
49	(Colombia) Diego Chará	Portland Timbers	Philadelphia Union	
50	(Portugal) Nani	Orlando City SC	Minnesota United FC	
51	(Argentina) Diego Valeri	Portland Timbers	Orlando City SC	

=== Team of the Week ===
The Team of the Week included the top players and coach during each week of the tournament, as chosen by the editorial team of MLSsoccer.com.

Week	Goalkeeper	Defenders	Midfielders	Forwards	Bench	Coach	Ref.
1	(Jamaica) Andre Blake	(France) Frédéric Brillant (United States) Justen Glad (United States) Kyle Duncan	(United States) Memo Rodríguez (United States) Darlington Nagbe (Argentina) Lucas Zelarayán (Trinidad and Tobago) Kevin Molino	(United States) Gyasi Zardes (United States) Ayo Akinola (Argentina) Gustavo Bou	(United States) Brad Guzan (Argentina) Sebastián Blanco (United States) Mark McKenzie (United States) Jackson Yueill (Spain) Alejandro Pozuelo (Spain) Carles Gil (Uruguay) Diego Rossi	(United States) Caleb Porter	
2	(Peru) Pedro Gallese	(Canada) Richie Laryea (United States) Mauricio Pineda (Ghana) Jonathan Mensah	(Spain) Alejandro Pozuelo (United States) Darlington Nagbe (United States) Brenden Aaronson (United States) Chris Mueller	(Uruguay) Diego Rossi (United States) Jeremy Ebobisse (United States) Ayo Akinola	(United States) Zac MacMath (Democratic Republic of the Congo) Larrys Mabiala (United States) Aaron Herrera (Spain) Oriol Rosell (United States) Osvaldo Alonso (Argentina) Lucas Zelarayán (United States) Frankie Amaya	(Colombia) Óscar Pareja	
3	(United States) Matt Turner	(United States) Nick Lima (United States) Mark McKenzie (Costa Rica) Kendall Waston (Sweden) Anton Tinnerholm	(United States) Jordan Morris (Argentina) Matías Vera (United States) Ethan Finlay (Peru) Yordy Reyna	(United States) Jeremy Ebobisse (Mexico) Alan Pulido	(Jamaica) Andre Blake (Serbia) Ranko Veselinović (United States) Osvaldo Alonso (United States) Darlington Nagbe (Japan) Yuya Kubo (Libya) Ismael Tajouri-Shradi (United States) Jonathan Lewis	(Netherlands) Jaap Stam	
4	(Canada) Thomas Hasal	(Germany) Kai Wagner (United States) Mark McKenzie (Peru) Alexander Callens	(Georgia (country)) Vako (Colombia) Eduard Atuesta (United States) Osvaldo Alonso (Argentina) Maximiliano Moralez (Argentina) Cristian Espinoza	(Argentina) Valentín Castellanos (Uruguay) Diego Rossi	(United States) Tim Melia (Ghana) Latif Blessing (Ecuador) Sebastian Méndez (United States) Hassani Dotson (Sweden) Magnus Eriksson (Uruguay) Brian Rodríguez (Argentina) Sebastián Blanco	(England) Adrian Heath	

=== Goal of the Week ===
The Goal of the Week determines the best goal during each week of the tournament. The editorial team of MLSsoccer.com shortlists goals for fans to vote for on Twitter.

Week	Player	Club	Scored against	Score	Date	Ref.
1	(Argentina) Lucas Zelarayán	Columbus Crew SC	FC Cincinnati	1–0 (27')	July 11, 2020	
2	(United States) Frankie Amaya	FC Cincinnati	Atlanta United FC	1–0 (76')	July 16, 2020	
3	(Guinea-Bissau) Gerso Fernandes	Sporting Kansas City	Real Salt Lake	2–0 (86')	July 22, 2020	
4	(Brazil) Sérgio Santos	Philadelphia Union	New England Revolution	1–0 (63')	July 25, 2020	

== Media and broadcasting ==
All games in the tournament were produced by ESPN as host broadcaster, and were televised by Major League Soccer's media partners in the United States, Canada, and worldwide. Per health protocols, few ESPN staff members had on-field access, on-site production staff were divided into smaller groups, and all games were called remotely (with ESPN's games being called from the network's headquarters in Bristol). ESPN decided against using simulated crowd noise for its broadcasts, instead placing a focus on "enhanced" in-game audio via microphones embedded in the field (Fox Sports and Univision/TUDN stated that, by contrast, they would use artificial crowd noise, with Fox offering options for crowd audio on the online streams of its matches). ESPN employed 33 cameras each on the three fields, and also used drone cameras for aerial shots. A large chroma key wall was erected at each field in place of grandstands, which was used for displaying in-game sponsor logos. Jon Champion and Taylor Twellman served as ESPN's lead broadcast team for the tournament, while Adrian Healey and Alejandro Moreno and Steve Cangialosi and Shep Messing called select games, with Stefano Fusaro served as the on-site reporter for all the matches. Fox Sports had John Strong and Stuart Holden commentate on all of their matches, while Rob Stone, Alexi Lalas, and Maurice Edu hosted the pregame and postgame shows for select matches.

== See also ==
- 2020 NBA Bubble, a similar concept for the National Basketball Association also held at the ESPN Wide World of Sports Complex
