= 2018 Portland Timbers season =

Portland Timbers
2018 season
- President: Merritt Paulson
- Head coach: Giovanni Savarese
- Stadium: Providence Park; Portland, Oregon (Capacity: 21,144)
- Major League Soccer: Conference: 5th Overall: 8th
- MLS Cup Playoffs: Runners-up
- U.S. Open Cup: Quarterfinals; LAFC 3–2 POR (July 18)
- Top goalscorer: League: Sebastián Blanco; Diego Valeri (10 each); All: Sebastián Blanco; Diego Valeri (14 each)
- Highest home attendance: League: 21,144; Open Cup: 14,556
- Lowest home attendance: League: 21,144; Open Cup: 12,769
- Average home league attendance: League: 21,144; Open Cup: 13,663
- Biggest win: POR 3–0 NYC (April 22)
- Biggest defeat: NY 4–0 POR (March 10)
| Primary colors | Secondary colors |
- All statistics correct as of April 16, 2018.

The 2018 Portland Timbers season was the 32nd season in their existence and the 8th season for the Portland Timbers in Major League Soccer (MLS), the top-flight professional soccer league in the United States and Canada. The season covers the period from the end of MLS Cup 2017 to the end of MLS Cup 2018.

== Season review by month ==
=== April ===
From April 5 until April 8 the eMLS Cup took place at PAX East in Boston. Timber's eSports player Edgar Guerrero (X_Thiago_Silva_0) finished 7th in the preliminary round, giving him a spot in the Western Quarter Finals. Guerrero would fall to Sporting Kansas City eSports player Alex Betancourt (SKC Alekzandur) in the Western Quarter Finals to a score of 3–2.

The Timbers traveled to Orlando, again without the injured Liam Ridgewell for their last away match before the home opener. In the 16th minute, Sebastián Blanco was issued a 2nd yellow card for diving; however, VAR was called to review and the card was overturned and a penalty issued. Even with Joe Bendik guessing the right way, Diego Valeri sent the ball into the far left side of the net, putting the Timbers up 1–0. In the 59th minute, Bill Tuiloma was able to head the ball into the net with from a free kick from Diego Valeri that would put the Timbers up 2–0. Starting from the 80th minute, Orlando City SC would begin their comeback starting with a flick from Chris Mueller from a corner kick taken by Yoshimar Yotún, putting Orlando on the board at 2–1. Shortly after in the 81st minute, a controversial penalty was awarded to Orlando from a foul to Dom Dwyer inside the box. It was taken and successfully converted by Sacha Kljestan. Finally, Orlando would seal the win in the 87th minute from a shot inside the box from Dom Dwyer. The final score of the match was 3–2 to Orlando City SC.

On April 14, Portland hosted their home opener for the 2018 campaign against Minnesota United FC. The Timbers Army sang the national anthem for the home opener, as is tradition in the MLS era, followed by unveiling their Singin' in the Rain themed tifo. In the 20th minute, Larrys Mabiala passed the ball to Alvas Powell who was a few feet past the halfway line. Powell was able to run the ball all the way into the box and take a shot sending the Timbers up 1–0. Shortly after in the 23rd minute, Powell was able to perform a cross to Diego Valeri. The Timbers went up 2–0. In the 27th minute, Minnesota's Miguel Ibarra had a goal disallowed after VAR caught him offside. In the 30th minute, Sebastián Blanco had a howler shot from about 30 yards out to almost have another goal, but instead hit the crossbar. In the 42nd minute, Ibbara attempted a header which Gleeson was able to make an extremely quick one handed save. In the 64th minute, Minnesota's Darwin Quintero was able to break through the box and score their first goal of the match, changing the score to 2–1. In the 74th minute, Blanco crossed the bar to Valeri who was deep inside the box. Valeri dropped the ball back to Cristhian Paredes and sent it to Fanendo Adi. Adi was quick to react and used his head to send the ball to the right side and putting the Timbers up 3–1, their highest lead of the season so far. In the 78th minute, Adi would score once again, but would be called offside. Finally in the 81st minute, Bill Tuiloma would accidentally volley the ball past Jake Gleeson's head and score an own goal. The final score was 3–2, giving the Timbers their first win of the 2018 season.

On April 17, Alvas Powell was awarded MLS Week 7 Player of the Week.

On April 19, Alvas Powell won MLS Week 7 Goal of the Week.

On April 22, The Timbers defeated New York City FC 3–0 who at the time was undefeated. Sebastián Blanco, Fanendo Adi, and Larrys Mabiala were the goal scorers and Jeff Attinella delivered the Timbers their first clean sheet of the year.

On April 23, Larrys Mabiala and coach Giovanni Savarese were awarded to MLS Team of the Week.

=== May ===
On May 5, Portland defeated San Jose Earthquakes 1–0 with a free kick goal from Diego Valeri.

On May 13, Portland defeated their rivals, Seattle Sounders 1–0 with goal from Sebastián Blanco.

On May 19, Portland continued their 5-game win streak with a 2–1 victory to Los Angeles FC. Goals scored by Cristhian Paredes and Samuel Armenteros. Both players achieved their first goal in MLS. Liam Ridgewell suffered an unknown injury and was subbed off in the 6th minute.

On May 21, Samuel Armenteros was nominated for Goal of the Week (Week 12).

On May 24, The Timbers drew to host San Jose Earthquakes in the fourth round of the 2018 U.S. Open Cup on June 6. Later that day, Samuel Armenteros won Goal of the Week (Week 12).

On May 26, Portland defeated Colorado Rapids 3–2 away. Samuel Armenteros achieved a brace and Diego Valeri moved back into the top goalscorers for the Timbers, tied with Sebastián Blanco at 5.

On May 29, Samuel Armenteros was awarded a spot on Team of the Week (Week 13). Later on that day, he would be announced as a nominee for Goal of the Week (Week 13).

On May 31, Samuel Armenteros won his second Goal of the Week (Week 13).

=== June ===
On June 2, Portland drew LA Galaxy at home with a score of 1–1. Diego Valeri converted a Penalty.

On June 4, David Guzmán of Costa Rica and Andy Polo of Peru, both made the final 23 man roster for the 2018 FIFA World Cup.

On June 6, Portland signed Andre Lewis, Marvin Loría, Darixon Vuelto and Renzo Zambrano from Portland Timbers 2 on short-term contracts.

Later on, Portland defeated San Jose Earthquakes at home 2–0 in the 2018 U.S. Open Cup round four.

On June 7, Portland drew to host LA Galaxy on June 15 for the fifth round of the 2018 U.S. Open Cup. The other possible teams in the west pot were LAFC and USL side Sacramento Republic FC. If Portland wins round five they will either travel to LAFC or Sacramento Republic FC depending on that match's outcome.

On June 9, Portland hosted Sporting Kansas City with a result of 0–0. Their unbeaten streak continues to nine but dropped to sixth place in the Western Conference.

On June 15, Portland defeated LA Galaxy 1–0 in the round of 16 for the 2018 U.S. Open Cup. The lone goal was scored by Sebastián Blanco, assisted by Fanendo Adi. The Timbers have increased their undefeated streak to 10 matches.

On June 20, Portland found out they will travel to face Los Angeles FC in the quarterfinal of the 2018 U.S. Open Cup on July 18.

On June 24, Portland resumed play after the MLS 2018 FIFA World Cup break by traveling to Atlanta United FC. Portland ended up drawing 1–1 with a goal from Larrys Mabiala, extending their unbeaten streak to 11.

On June 25, Jeff Attinella was award a spot on MLS Team of the Week: Week 17.

On June 30, Portland traveled to face their rivals Seattle Sounders FC for their first official Cascadia Cup match of the year. Portland defeated Seattle 3–2 with Larrys Mabiala capturing a brace and Samuel Armenteros getting a goal. The Timbers are now 12 matches unbeaten.

=== July ===
On July 2, Diego Valeri and Larrys Mabiala were awarded a spot on Team of the Week (Week 18).

On July 7, Portland defeated San Jose Earthquakes at home 2–1 with Samuel Armenteros receiving a brace. Portland is now undefeated in 13 matches.

On July 9, Samuel Armenteros and Diego Valeri we're awarded a spot on Team of the Week (Week 19).

On July 12, Marco Farfan was announced as part of the roster for the 2018 MLS Homegrown match.

On July 15, Portland drew Los Angeles Football Club at Banc of California Stadium with a score of 0–0. Portland is now undefeated in 14 matches. Diego Chara received another yellow card this match and will be suspended for the next league match.

On July 17, Portland signed Argentinian midfielder Tomás Conechny on a 2018 loan with purchase option at the end of the season.

On July 18, Portland fell to Los Angeles Football Club at Banc of California Stadium with a score of 2–3. Ending their unbeaten streak across all competitions at 14. They are still unbeaten in league play at 11.

On July 19, Portland placed a protest stating that Los Angeles Football Club broke a U.S. Open Cup rule by playing 6 international players when the rule is 5 for professional level clubs. The draw was delayed due to this.

On July 20, Portland officially withdrew its protest.

On July 21, Portland hosted and drew Montreal Impact 2–2. Samuel Armenteros and Diego Valeri were the goal scorers.

On July 28, Portland defeated Houston Dynamo 2–1 with goals from Sebastián Blanco and Fanendo Adi. Adi would score his final goal as a timber and push the Timber's league undefeated streak to 13.

On July 30, Fanendo Adi was traded to FC Cincinnati for $850,000 in allocation money. Portland now has an open Designated Player slot.

=== August ===
On August 2, Portland's assistant head coach Sean McAuley stepped down to become an assistant coach at Orlando City SC.

On August 4, Portland defeated Philadelphia Union 3–0 at home with two successfully converted penalties by Diego Valeri and Dairon Asprilla and a goal by David Guzmán.

On August 8, Vytautas Andriuškevičius was traded to D.C. United for $50,00 in Target Allocation Money (TAM). Portland later that day signed their former 2015 MLS Cup winner left back, Jorge Villafaña from Liga MX side Santos Laguna. Portland traded their way to number 1 on the allocation list by giving LA Galaxy the number 16 position in the Allocation Ranking, $75,000 in General Allocation Money (GAM) and $100,000 in 2019 TAM.

On August 9, Lucas Melano returns to Portland from loan with Estudiantes.

On August 11, Portland lost for the first time at home this season and ended their 15 league unbeaten streak against their rivals, Vancouver Whitecaps FC. The final was a score of 2–1 with Diego Valeri converting a penalty kick.

On August 15, Portland traveled to Audi Field for the first time in Washington, D.C. and lost 4–1. The lone goalscorer was Samuel Armenteros.

On August 17, Portland signed goalkeeper Steve Clark off waivers from D.C. United.

On August 18, Portland traveled to Children's Mercy Park to face Sporting Kansas City with a defeat of 3–0.

On August 26, Portland hosted Seattle Sounders FC in their third out of four Cascadia matches. Portland lost 0–1.

On August 28, Portland loaned out midfielder Eryk Williamson to Portuguese first-division side Clube Desportivo Santa Clara for the club's 2018–19 season with the ability to recall the player in January 2019.

On August 29, Portland defeated Toronto FC at home 2–0. Goals were scored by Diego Chará and David Guzmán.

=== September ===
On September 1, Portland traveled to Gillette Stadium to face New England Revolution. The match ended in a 1–1 draw with a goal from Lawrence Olum.

On September 4, three players were called up to play for their national teams. Andrés Flores for El Salvador, David Guzmán for Costa Rica, and Alvas Powell for Jamaica.

On September 8, Portland defeated Colorado Rapids at home 2–0. The goalscorers were Jeremy Ebobisse and Diego Valeri. Both goals were assisted by Sebastián Blanco.

On September 10, Jeremy Ebobisse, Sebastián Blanco, Zarek Valentin, Diego Chará, and Diego Valeri were all awarded spots on MLS: Team of the Week: Week 28.

On September 11, Sebastián Blanco was awarded MLS Player of the Week: Week 28.

On September 15, Portland traveled to BBVA Compass Stadium and lost to the Houston Dynamo 1–4. The lone goal was an own goal from Houston's Alejandro Fuenmayor.

On September 19, Portland defeated Columbus Crew SC at home 3–2 with goals from David Guzmán, Andy Polo, and an own goal from Lalas Abubakar.

On September 22, Portland traveled to TCF Bank Stadium to play Minnesota United FC. Portland lost 2–3 with goals from Alvas Powell and Sebastián Blanco.

On September 23, Alvas Powell was nominated for Goal of the Week: Week 30.

On September 24, Andy Polo was awarded a bench spot on Team of the Week: Week 30.

On September 29, Portland hosted FC Dallas that ended in a 0–0 draw. Liam Ridgewell was sent off with a straight red in the 90+4 minute.

=== October ===
On October 6, Portland traveled to Rio Tinto Stadium where they defeated Real Salt Lake 4–1. Goals were scored by Jeremy Ebobisse, a brace by Sebastián Blanco, and Lucas Melano.

On October 9, Sebastián Blanco was awarded a spot on Team of the Week:Week 32 and nominated for Goal of the Week:Week 32.

On October 21, Portland hosted Real Salt Lake. Portland won 3–0, with goals from Larrys Mabiala, Diego Valeri, and Diego Chará. Steve Clark received a clean sheet.

On October 22, Sebastián Blanco was awarded a spot on Team of the Week:Week 34.

On October 28, Portland traveled to BC Place to play their final Cascadia Cup and league match against Vancouver Whitecaps FC. Portland lost 2–1 with a goal from Andrés Flores. At the end of the match, Portland finished eighth for the Supporters' Shield, fifth in the MLS Western Conference, and third in the Cascadia Cup. Portland is set to play in the 2018 MLS Cup Playoffs knockout round against fourth seed FC Dallas.

On October 31, Portland began its 2018 MLS Cup Playoffs run by traveling to Toyota Stadium where they would face FC Dallas. Portland advanced to the 2018 MLS Western Conference Semi-final round with a 2–1 victory. Both goals were scored by Diego Valeri.

=== November ===
On November 4, Portland hosted Seattle Sounders FC for leg one of the 2018 MLS Western Conference Semi-final. Portland emerged victorious 2–1 with goals from Jeremy Ebobisse and Sebastián Blanco.

On November 5, left back Jorge Villafaña was called up for U.S. Men's National Team roster for international friendlies against England, Italy.

On November 8, Portland traveled to CenturyLink Field to take on Seattle Sounders FC for the second leg of the 2018 MLS Western Conference Semi-final. Coming into the second leg, Portland are up 2–1 on aggregate. The match would end at full time at 2–1 with a goal from Sebastián Blanco, sending the match into added extra time. During the added extra time, both teams would score a goal with Dairon Asprilla being the only scorer for Portland. The match had to be decided by penalties where Portland emerged victorious with the outcome of 4–2 with successful converted penalties by Lucas Melano, Diego Valeri, Sebastián Blanco, and Dairon Asprilla. Portland will now face Sporting KC in the 2018 Western Conference Finals.

Midfielders Cristhian Paredes (Paraguay) and Andy Polo (Peru) were called up by their respective national teams on November 12.

On November 25, Portland hosted Sporting KC for the start of the first leg in the 2018 MLS Western Conference Finals. The game ended in a 0–0 draw.

On November 29, Portland traveled to Children's Mercy Park to finish the second leg of the 2018 MLS Western Conference Final. Portland defeated Sporting KC 3–2 and won on aggregate by the same score. Portland will travelled to Mercedes-Benz Stadium to play Atlanta United FC in the 2018 MLS Cup final on December 8, 2018. This was Portland's second appearance at an MLS Cup.

=== December ===
On December 8, Portland traveled to Mercedes-Benz Stadium for the 2018 MLS Cup Final against Atlanta United FC where they were defeated 2–0.

== Team kits ==
Supplier: Adidas / Sponsor: Alaska Air

| Primary | Secondary | Parley |

== Coaching staff and front office ==
=== Executive staff ===
| Position | Staff |
|---|---|
| Majority owner & president | Merritt Paulson |
| Chief operating officer | Mike Golub |
| General manager and technical director | Gavin Wilkinson |

Last updated: January 12, 2018
Source: Portland Timbers

=== Coaching staff ===
| Position | Staff |
|---|---|
| Head coach | Giovanni Savarese |
| Assistant coach | Vacant |
| Assistant coach | Carlos Llamosa |
| Goalkeeping coach | Guillermo Valencia |
| Video analyst and assistant coach | Shannon Murray |
| Head athletic trainer | Jon MacGregor, ATC |
| Athletic trainer | Taichi Kitagawa, ATC |
| Athletic trainer | Alex Margarito, ATC |
| Director of sports science | Nick Milanos |

Last updated: August 2, 2018
Source: Portland Timbers

=== Stadiums ===
| Ground (capacity and dimensions) | Providence Park (21,144 / 110x75 yards) |
| Training ground | Adidas Training Facility |

Source: Providence Park

== Squad information ==
=== First team ===
As of September 5, 2018

| No. | Name | Nat | Positions | Since | Date of birth (age) | Signed from | Games | Goals |
Goalkeepers
| 1 | Jeff Attinella | (United States) | GK | 2017 | September 29, 1988 (age 37) | (United States) Minnesota United FC | 32 | 0 |
| 12 | Steve Clark | (United States) | GK | 2018 | April 29, 1986 (age 39) | free transfer | 1 | 0 |
| 43 | Kendall McIntosh | (United States) | GK | 2017 | January 24, 1994 (age 32) | (United States) Portland Timbers 2 | 1 | 0 |
| 90 | Jake Gleeson | (New Zealand) | GK | 2011 | June 26, 1990 (age 35) | (United States) Portland Timbers U23s | 59 | 0 |
Defenders
| 2 | Alvas Powell | (Jamaica) | RB | 2013 | July 18, 1994 (age 31) | (Jamaica) Portmore United FC | 116 | 5 |
| 4 | Jorge Villafaña | (United States) | LB | 2018 | September 16, 1989 (age 36) | (Mexico) Santos Laguna | 52 | 2 |
| 7 | Roy Miller | (Costa Rica) | CB | 2017 | November 28, 1984 (age 41) | (Costa Rica) Deportivo Saprissa | 26 | 1 |
| 16 | Zarek Valentin | (United States) | LB / RB | 2016 | August 6, 1991 (age 34) | (Norway) FK Bodø/Glimt | 63 | 1 |
| 18 | Julio Cascante (INT) | (Costa Rica) | CB | 2018 | October 3, 1993 (age 32) | (Costa Rica) Deportivo Saprissa | 16 | 0 |
| 24 | Liam Ridgewell (C) | (England) | CB / LB | 2014 | June 21, 1984 (age 41) | (England) West Bromwich Albion | 91 | 6 |
| 25 | Bill Tuiloma (INT) | (New Zealand) | DF / CDM | 2017 | March 27, 1995 (age 30) | free transfer | 9 | 1 |
| 26 | Modou Jadama | (The Gambia) | RB | 2018 | March 17, 1994 (age 31) | free transfer | 1 | 0 |
| 32 | Marco Farfan (HG) | (United States) | LB | 2017 | November 12, 1998 (age 27) | (United States) Portland Timbers 2 | 16 | 0 |
| 50 | Larrys Mabiala (INT) | (Democratic Republic of the Congo) | CB | 2017 | 8 October 1987 (age 38) | (Turkey) Kayserispor | 36 | 4 |
Midfielders
| 8 | Diego Valeri (DP) | (Argentina) | CAM | 2013 | March 15, 1988 (age 37) | (Argentina) Lanús | 172 | 67 |
| 10 | Sebastián Blanco (DP) | (Argentina) | MF / FW | 2017 | 5 March 1990 (age 36) | (Argentina) San Lorenzo | 55 | 14 |
| 13 | Lawrence Olum | (Kenya) | CB / DM | 2017 | July 10, 1984 (age 41) | (United States) Sporting Kansas City | 46 | 1 |
| 14 | Andrés Flores | (El Salvador) | CDM | 2018 | August 31, 1990 (age 35) | free transfer | 21 | 0 |
| 19 | Tomás Conechny (INT) (L) | (Argentina) | MF | 2018 | March 30, 1998 (age 27) | (Argentina) San Lorenzo | 2 | 0 |
| 20 | David Guzmán (INT) | (Costa Rica) | CDM | 2017 | February 18, 1990 (age 36) | (Costa Rica) Deportivo Saprissa | 32 | 2 |
| 21 | Diego Chara | (Colombia) | CDM | 2011 | April 5, 1986 (age 39) | (Colombia) Deportes Tolima | 224 | 7 |
| 22 | Cristhian Paredes (L) | (Paraguay) | CDM | 2018 | May 18, 1998 (age 27) | (Mexico) América | (16 On Loan) | (1 On Loan) |
| 23 | Jack Barmby (INT) | (England) | LB / LW / RW / ST | 2016 | November 14, 1994 (age 31) | (England) Leicester City | 10 | 1 |
| 30 | Eryk Williamson (HG) (LO) | (United States) | | 2018 | June 11, 1997 (age 28) | (United States) D.C. United | 0 | 0 |
Forwards
| 11 | Andy Polo (L) | (Peru) | ST / W | 2018 | September 29, 1994 (age 31) | (Mexico) Morelia | (14 On Loan) | (0 On Loan) |
| 17 | Jeremy Ebobisse | (United States) | FW | 2017 | February 14, 1997 (age 29) | (United States) 2017 MLS SuperDraft | 15 | 1 |
| 19 | Victor Arboleda (INT) | (Colombia) | FW / MF | 2017 | January 1, 1997 (age 29) | (United States) Portland Timbers 2 | 6 | 0 |
| 26 | Lucas Melano (INT) | (Argentina) | CF / LW / RW | 2015 | March 1, 1993 (age 33) | (Argentina) Club Atlético Lanús | 44 | 4 |
| 27 | Dairon Asprilla | (Colombia) | RW / LW / FW | 2015 | May 25, 1992 (age 33) | (Colombia) Atlético Nacional | 76 | 5 |
| 28 | Foster Langsdorf (HG) | (United States) | FW | 2018 | December 14, 1995 (age 30) | N/A | 0 | 0 |
| 99 | Samuel Armenteros (L) (INT) | (Sweden) | CF | 2018 | May 27, 1990 (age 35) | (Italy) Benevento Calcio | (22 On Loan) | (8 On Loan) |

- (HG) = Homegrown Player
- (GA) = Generation Adidas Player
- (DP) = Designated Player
- (INT) = Player using International Roster Slot
- (L) = On Loan to the Timbers
- (LO) = Loaned out to another club

=== eMLS team ===
As of March 20, 2018

| Name | Nat | Since | Gamer Tag |
Players
| Edgar Guerrero | (United States) | 2018 | X_Thiago_Silva_O |

== Competitions ==
=== Competitions overview ===
| Competition | Record | | | | | | | | Start round | First match | Last match | Final position (Conference) |
| Competition | G | W | D | L | GF | GA | GD | Win % | | | | |
|---|---|---|---|---|---|---|---|---|---|---|---|---|
| Major League Soccer * | 34 | 15 | 9 | 10 | 54 | 48 | +6 | 44.12 | 1 | March 4, 2017 | October 28, 2017 | 8th (5th Western) |
| MLS Cup Playoffs | 6 | 3 | 1 | 2 | 9 | 9 | +0 | 50.00 | Knock Out | October 31, 2018 | December 8, 2018 | Runners-up |
| U.S. Open Cup | 3 | 2 | 0 | 1 | 5 | 3 | +2 | 66.67 | 4th Round | June 6, 2018 | July 18, 2018 | Quarterfinals |
| Cascadia Cup * | 4 | 1 | 0 | 3 | 4 | 5 | −1 | 25.00 | 15 | June 30, 2017 | October 28, 2017 | 3rd |
| Total | 43 | 20 | 10 | 13 | 68 | 60 | +8 | 46.51 | | | | |

|} Updated to match played December 10, 2018
Source: Competitions

* Major League Soccer and Cascadia Cup are all part of MLS regular season league play. As a result, only Major League Soccer portion is included in the total.

=== Major League Soccer ===
==== Preseason ====
===== Desert Friendlies – Tucson, Arizona =====
Win Draw Loss Upcoming fixture

| January 31, 2018 1 | San Jose Earthquakes | 0–0 | Portland Timbers | Tucson, Arizona |
| 11:00 PST | Marie (red card) 7' | Report | Guzmán (yellow card) 29'; Zambrano (red card) 57' | Stadium: Kino Veterans Memorial Stadium |

| February 3, 2018 2 | Seattle Sounders FC | 2–1 | Portland Timbers | Tucson, Arizona |
| 17:00 PST | Roldan 8'; Delem (yellow card) 32'; Bwana 68' (Mathers); Mathers (yellow card) 73' | Report | Adi (yellow card) 22'; Guzmán (yellow card) 24'; Valeri 24' (Blanco) | Stadium: Kino Veterans Memorial Stadium |

| February 14, 2018 3 | Houston Dynamo | 1–1 | Portland Timbers | Tucson, Arizona |
| 13:00 PST | Alvarez 12' (Martínez); Cabezas (yellow card) 50'; Elis (yellow card) 85' | Report | Guzmán (yellow card) 26'; Blanco (yellow card) 30'; Asprilla 33' (Blanco); Vytas (red card) 85' | Stadium: Kino Veterans Memorial Stadium |

| February 17, 2018 4 | FC Dallas | 2–1 | Portland Timbers | Tucson, Arizona |
| 11:00 PST | Urruti 15' (Barrios), 38' (Barrios) | Report | Armenteros 70' (Valeri) | Stadium: Kino Veterans Memorial Stadium |

| February 21, 2018 5 | New York Red Bulls | 1–4 | Portland Timbers | Tucson, Arizona |
| 13:00 PST | Vytas 56' (O.G.); Murphy (yellow card) 56' | Report | Polo 10' (Armenteros, Arboleda); Armenteros 12'; Arboleda 69'; Cascante 89' (Flores) | Stadium: Kino Veterans Memorial Stadium |

| February 24, 2018 6 | Sporting Kansas City | 2–3 | Portland Timbers | Tucson, Arizona |
| 15:00 PST | Espinoza 27' (Russell); Rubio (yellow card) 45+1' (goal) 52' (Lobato) | Report | Mabiala (yellow card) 29'; Powell (yellow card) 31'; Ridgewell (yellow card) 38'; Armenteros 53', 58'; Paredes 77' | Stadium: Kino Veterans Memorial Stadium |

==== MLS regular season ====
===== Western Conference =====
| Pos | Team | Pld | W | L | T | GF | GA | GD | Pts | Qualification |
|---|---|---|---|---|---|---|---|---|---|---|
| 3 | Los Angeles FC | 34 | 16 | 9 | 9 | 68 | 52 | +16 | 57 | MLS Cup Knockout Round |
| 4 | FC Dallas | 34 | 16 | 9 | 9 | 52 | 44 | +8 | 57 | MLS Cup Knockout Round |
| 5 | Portland Timbers | 34 | 15 | 10 | 9 | 54 | 48 | +6 | 54 | MLS Cup Knockout Round |
| 6 | Real Salt Lake | 34 | 14 | 13 | 7 | 55 | 58 | −3 | 49 | MLS Cup Knockout Round |
| 7 | LA Galaxy | 34 | 13 | 12 | 9 | 66 | 64 | +2 | 48 | |

Source: MLS

===== Overall standings =====
| Pos | Team | Pld | W | L | T | GF | GA | GD | Pts |
|---|---|---|---|---|---|---|---|---|---|
| 6 | FC Dallas | 34 | 16 | 9 | 9 | 52 | 44 | +8 | 57 |
| 7 | New York City FC | 34 | 16 | 10 | 8 | 59 | 45 | +14 | 56 |
| 8 | Portland Timbers | 34 | 15 | 10 | 9 | 54 | 48 | +6 | 54 |
| 9 | D.C. United | 34 | 14 | 11 | 9 | 60 | 50 | +10 | 51 |
| 10 | Columbus Crew | 34 | 14 | 11 | 9 | 43 | 45 | −2 | 51 |

Source: MLS
Rules for classification: 1) points; 2) total wins; 3) total goal differential; 4) total goals scored; 5) disciplinary points; 6) away goals scored; 7) away goal differential; 8) coin toss or drawing of lots

===== Matches =====
Win Draw Loss Upcoming fixture

| March 4, 2018 1 | LA Galaxy | 2–1 | Portland Timbers | Carson, California |
| 19:00 PST | Alessandrini (yellow card) 19' (goal) 34'; Kamara 32' (Feltscher, dos Santos); Ciani (yellow card) 89' | Report | Blanco 66' (Adi); Mabiala (yellow card) 86' | Stadium: StubHub Center; Attendance: 25,462; Referee: Jair Marrufo |

| March 10, 2018 2 | New York Red Bulls | 4–0 | Portland Timbers | Harrison, New Jersey |
| 16:00 PST | Mines 18', (yellow card) 72'; Lade (yellow card) 68'; Wright-Phillips 77', (yellow card) 90'; Rivas 80', 90+3' | Report | Mabiala (yellow card) 74' | Stadium: Red Bull Arena; Attendance: 18,374; Referee: Allen Chapman |

| March 24, 2018 3 | FC Dallas | 1–1 | Portland Timbers | Frisco, Texas |
| 12:30 PST | Hedges (yellow card) 8'; Lamah 37' (Hayes) (yellow card) 75' | Report | Olum (yellow card) 75' (red card); Blanco 47' (Adi); Chara (yellow card) 90' | Stadium: Toyota Stadium; Attendance: 13,851; Referee: Mark Geiger |

| March 31, 2018 4 | Chicago Fire | 2–2 | Portland Timbers | Bridgeview, Illinois |
| 15:00 PST | Nikolic (yellow card) 12'; Nikolic 50' (Vincent, Schweinsteiger); Vincent 84' (Schweinsteiger) | Report | Valeri 6' (Blanco); Valeri (yellow card) 52'; Blanco 55' (Flores) | Stadium: Toyota Park; Attendance: 13,678; Referee: Drew Fischer |

| April 8, 2018 5 | Orlando City SC | 3–2 | Portland Timbers | Orlando, Florida |
| 13:00 PST | El-Munir (yellow card) 28'; Mueller 80' (Yotún); Kljestan 82' (PK); Dwyer 87' (Allen) (yellow card) 90+3' | Report | Blanco (yellow card) 8'; Valeri 20' (PK); Tuiloma 59' (Valeri); Gleeson (yellow card) 77' | Stadium: Orlando City Stadium; Attendance: 22,337; Referee: Drew Fischer |

| April 14, 2018 6 | Portland Timbers | 3–2 | Minnesota United FC | Portland, Oregon |
| 19:30 PST | Powell 20' (Mabiala); Valeri 23' (Powell, Paredes); Adi 74' (Paredes, Valeri); Chara (yellow card) 90+2' | Report | Schüller (yellow card) 34'; Burch (yellow card) 39'; Quintero 64' (Manley); Tuiloma 81' (o.g.); Ibson (yellow card) 86'; Boxall (yellow card) 90+2' | Stadium: Providence Park; Attendance: 21,144; Referee: Jose Carlos Rivero |

| April 22, 2018 7 | Portland Timbers | 3–0 | New York City FC | Portland, Oregon |
| 15:00 PST | Blanco 26' (Flores, Powell); Adi 38'; Mabiala 66' (Valeri) | Report | Ring (yellow card) 63'; Callens (yellow card) 90+2' | Stadium: Providence Park; Attendance: 21,144; Referee: Ted Unkel |

| May 5, 2018 8 | San Jose Earthquakes | 0–1 | Portland Timbers | San Jose, California |
| 19:30 PST | Godoy (yellow card) 69'; Amarikwa (yellow card) 90+7' | Report | Paredes (yellow card) 45+1'; Chara (yellow card) 53'; Mabiala (yellow card) 77'; Valeri 88'; Ridgewell (yellow card) 90+3'; Polo (yellow card) 90+4' | Stadium: Avaya Stadium; Attendance: 17,850; Referee: Chris Penso |

| May 13, 2018 9 ~~Cascadia Cup~~ | Portland Timbers | 1–0 | Seattle Sounders FC | Portland, Oregon |
| 13:00 PST | Ridgewell (yellow card) 44'; Blanco 86' (Armenteros) (yellow card) 90+6' | Report | Delem (yellow card) 34'; A. Roldan (yellow card) 76'; Wingo (yellow card) 82' | Stadium: Providence Park; Attendance: 21,144; Referee: Robert Sibiga |

| May 19, 2018 10 | Portland Timbers | 2–1 | Los Angeles FC | Portland, Oregon |
| 12:00 PST | Chara (yellow card) 45'; Paredes 52'; Valentin (yellow card) 54'; Armenteros 81' (Paredes) (yellow card) 82' | Report | Beitashour (yellow card) 21'; Kaye (yellow card) 53'; Zimmerman (yellow card) 66'; Vela 74' | Stadium: Providence Park; Attendance: 21,144; Referee: Drew Fischer |

| May 26, 2018 11 | Colorado Rapids | 2–3 | Portland Timbers | Commerce City, Colorado |
| 18:00 PST | Gashi (yellow card) 3'; Wilson (yellow card) 23'; Cascante 31' (o.g.); Nicholson (yellow card) 87'; Boli (yellow card) 87' (goal) 90+9' (pen.) | Report | Armenteros 29' (Blanco) 37'; Valeri (yellow card) 38' (goal) 56' (Blanco); Mabiala (yellow card) 62'; Andrés Flores (yellow card) 90' | Stadium: Dick's Sporting Goods Park; Attendance: 17,424; Referee: Sorin Stoica |

| June 2, 2018 12 | Portland Timbers | 1–1 | LA Galaxy | Portland, Oregon |
| 14:00 PST | Valeri 57' (pen.); Chara (yellow card) 62' | Report | Pontius 20' (Boateng); Pedro (yellow card) 74' | Stadium: Providence Park; Attendance: 21,144; Referee: Alan Kelly |

| June 9, 2018 13 | Portland Timbers | 0–0 | Sporting Kansas City | Portland, Oregon |
| 19:30 PST | Blanco (yellow card) 90+3' | Report | Opara (yellow card) 90+3' | Stadium: Providence Park; Attendance: 21,144; Referee: Chris Penso |

| June 24, 2018 14 | Atlanta United FC | 1–1 | Portland Timbers | Atlanta, Georgia |
| 13:30 PST | Escobar (yellow card) 32'; Gressel 56' | Report | Chara (yellow card) 24'; Mabiala 32' (yellow card) 44' | Stadium: Mercedes-Benz Stadium; Attendance: 45,116; Referee: Jose Carlos Rivero |

| June 30, 2018 15 Cascadia Cup | Seattle Sounders FC | 2–3 | Portland Timbers | Seattle, Washington |
| 13:30 PST | Rodriguez 51' (Lodeiro); Marshall 68' (Lodeiro); Tolo (yellow card) 85'; Dempsey (yellow card) 89'; Kee-Hee (yellow card) 90' | Report | Mabiala 48' (Valeri) 74' (Valeri); Armenteros 57' (Valeri); Valentin (yellow card) 87' | Stadium: CenturyLink Field; Attendance: 47,521; Referee: Ismail Elfath |

| July 7, 2018 16 | Portland Timbers | 2–1 | San Jose Earthquakes | Portland, Oregon |
| 20:00 PST | Armenteros 14' (Valeri); Chara (yellow card) 46'; Armenteros 53' (Valeri, Blanco); Asprilla (yellow card) 55' | Report | Cummings (yellow card) 1'; Jungwirth 87' (Amarikwa) | Stadium: Providence Park; Attendance: 21,144; Referee: Ted Unkel |

| July 15, 2018 17 | Los Angeles FC | 0–0 | Portland Timbers | Los Angeles, California |
| 15:00 PST | Feilhaber (yellow card) 43'; Nguyen (red card) 84'; Zimmerman (yellow card) 90+3' | Recap | Chara (yellow card) 45+3'; Blanco (yellow card) 84' | Stadium: Banc of California Stadium; Attendance: 22,000; Referee: Silviu Petrescu |

| July 21, 2018 18 | Portland Timbers | 2–2 | Montreal Impact | Portland, Oregon |
| 20:00 PST | Armenteros 39'; Valeri 65' | Report | Piette (yellow card) 19'; Taïder 23' (Silva); Mancosu 41' (Piatti) | Stadium: Providence Park; Attendance: 21,144; Referee: Fotis Bazakos |

| July 28, 2018 19 | Portland Timbers | 2–1 | Houston Dynamo | Portland, Oregon |
| 18:00 PST | Blanco 7' (Powell) (yellow card) 39'; Powell (yellow card) 9'; Asprilla (yellow card) 17'; Adi 80' (Valeri) | Report | Quioto 12' (Elis); Elis (yellow card) 17'; Watts (yellow card) 26' | Stadium: Providence Park; Attendance: 21,144; Referee: Nima Saghafi |

| August 4, 2018 20 | Portland Timbers | 3–0 | Philadelphia Union | Portland, Oregon |
| 20:00 PST | Valeri 58' (PK); Asprilla 84' (PK); Guzmán 87' (Valeri) | Report | Bedoya (yellow card) 90' | Stadium: Providence Park; Attendance: 21,144; Referee: Alan Kelly |

| August 11, 2018 21 Cascadia Cup | Portland Timbers | 1–2 | Vancouver Whitecaps FC | Portland, Oregon |
| 20:00 PST | Valeri 71' (PK); Guzmán (yellow card) 74' | Report | K. Kamara 14' (Waston); Techera 43' (Shea) (yellow card) 45+1'; Shea (yellow card) 50' | Stadium: Providence Park; Attendance: 21,144; Referee: Jair Marrufo |

| August 15, 2018 22 | D.C. United | 4–1 | Portland Timbers | Washington, D.C. |
| 17:00 PST | Arriola (yellow card) 33'; Rooney 43' (Asad) 68'; Fisher 47' (Acosta); Canouse (yellow card) 72'; Acosta (yellow card) 73'; Mattocks 90+1' (Segura) (yellow card) 90+2' | Report | Armenteros 35' (Polo, Blanco) | Stadium: Audi Field; Attendance: 18,219; Referee: Robert Sibiga |

| August 18, 2018 23 | Sporting Kansas City | 3–0 | Portland Timbers | Kansas City, Kansas |
| 17:30 PST | Rubio 28' (Espinoza) 37' (Sallói, Besler); Russell 89' (Németh) | Report | Cascante (yellow card) 51'; Valentin (yellow card) 60' | Stadium: Children's Mercy Park; Attendance: 19,737; Referee: Allen Chapman |

| August 26, 2018 24 Cascadia Cup | Portland Timbers | 0–1 | Seattle Sounders FC | Portland, Oregon |
| 18:30 PST | Chará (yellow card) 22'; Blanco (yellow card) 65'; Asprilla (yellow card) 87' | Report | Smith (yellow card) 65'; Cascante 76' (o.g) | Stadium: Providence Park; Attendance: 21,144; Referee: Chris Penso |

| August 29, 2018 25 | Portland Timbers | 2–0 | Toronto FC | Portland, Oregon |
| 19:30 PST | Chara 64' (Blanco, Valentin); Guzmán 83' (yellow card) 85' | Report | Delgado (yellow card) 32' | Stadium: Providence Park; Attendance: 21,144; Referee: Fotis Bazakos |

| September 1, 2018 26 | New England Revolution | 1–1 | Portland Timbers | Foxborough, Massachusetts |
| 16:30 PST | Caldwell 58', (yellow card) 76'; Caicedo (yellow card) 60'; Mancienne (yellow card) 87'; Penilla (yellow card) 90+1' | Report | Blanco (yellow card) 19'; Olum (yellow card) 67', (goal) 70' (Cascante, Guzmán); Clark (yellow card) 90+1' | Stadium: Gillette Stadium; Attendance: 16,040; Referee: José Carlos Rivero |

| September 8, 2018 27 | Portland Timbers | 2–0 | Colorado Rapids | Portland, Oregon |
| 19:30 PST | Ebobisse 45' (Blanco); Valeri 65' (Blanco); Armenteros (yellow card) 78' | Report | Blomberg (yellow card) 43' | Stadium: Providence Park; Attendance: 21,144; Referee: Drew Fischer |

| September 15, 2018 28 | Houston Dynamo | 4–1 | Portland Timbers | Houston, Texas |
| 17:30 PST | Elis 32'; Manotas 39', (yellow card) 65', (goal) 71'; Fuenmayor 81' | Report | Fuenmayor 9' (o.g.); Valentin (yellow card) 31'; Ebobisse (yellow card) 34' | Stadium: BBVA Compass Stadium; Attendance: 15,256; Referee: Jair Marrufo |

| September 19, 2018 29 | Portland Timbers | 3–2 | Columbus Crew SC | Portland, Oregon |
| 19:30 PST | Polo (yellow card) 10' (goal) 37'; Guzmán 18' (Polo, Blanco) (yellow card) 34'; Abubakar 48' (o.g.) | Report | Hansen; 7' (Valenzuela, Santos); 90+3' (Maloney, Sosa); Sauro (yellow card) 45+1'; Trapp (yellow card) 49'; Maloney (yellow card) 85' | Stadium: Providence Park; Attendance: 21,144; Referee: Ted Unkel |

| September 22, 2018 30 | Minnesota United FC | 3–2 | Portland Timbers | Minneapolis, Minnesota |
| 17:00 PST | R. Ibarra 18' (Quintero) 36' (Quintero); Boxall 43' (Schüller); Maximiano (yellow card) 70'; Bob (red card) 89' | Report | Powell 55'; Blanco (yellow card) 71' (goal) 79' (Villafaña) | Stadium: TCF Bank Stadium; Attendance: 24,525; Referee: David Gantar |

| September 29, 2018 31 | Portland Timbers | 0–0 | FC Dallas | Portland, Oregon |
| 17:00 PST | Ridgewell (red card) 90+4'; Chara (yellow card) 90+7' | Report | Gruezo (yellow card) 72'; Hedges (yellow card) 75'; González (yellow card) 82' | Stadium: Providence Park; Attendance: 21,144; Referee: Allen Chapman |

| October 6, 2018 32 | Real Salt Lake | 1–4 | Portland Timbers | Sandy, Utah |
| 18:30 PST | Savarino 55' (Plata); Beckerman (yellow card) 58'; Sunny (yellow card) 66' | Report | Chará (yellow card) 26'; Ebobisse 33' (Blanco); Guzmán (yellow card) 55'; Blanco 70' 73' (Valeri, Ebobisse); Melano 88'; Valeri (yellow card) 90+2' | Stadium: Rio Tinto Stadium; Attendance: 20,034; Referee: Robert Sibiga |

| October 21, 2018 33 | Portland Timbers | 3–0 | Real Salt Lake | Portland, Oregon |
| TBD | Mabiala 15' (Valeri); Valeri (yellow card) 63'; Chara 68' (Blanco); Blanco (yellow card) 68' (goal) 87' (Melano) | Report | Beckerman (yellow card) 27' | Stadium: Providence Park; Attendance: 21,144; Referee: Ismail Elfath |

| October 28, 2018 34 Cascadia Cup | Vancouver Whitecaps FC | 2–1 | Portland Timbers | Vancouver, British Columbia, Canada |
| 13:30 PST | Davies 28' (Nerwinski) 31' (yellow card) 82' | Report | Melano (yellow card) 27'; Flores 90' | Stadium: BC Place; Attendance: 25,348; Referee: Ted Unkel |

The 2018 MLS regular-season schedule was released on January 4, 2018.

===== Results by round =====
| Matchday | 1 | 2 | 3 | 4 | 5 | 6 | 7 | 8 | 9 | 10 | 11 | 12 | 13 | 14 | 15 | 16 | 17 | 18 | 19 | 20 | 21 | 22 | 23 | 24 | 25 | 26 | 27 | 28 | 29 | 30 | 31 | 32 | 33 | 34 |
|---|---|---|---|---|---|---|---|---|---|---|---|---|---|---|---|---|---|---|---|---|---|---|---|---|---|---|---|---|---|---|---|---|---|---|
| Stadium | A | A | A | A | A | H | H | A | H | H | A | H | H | A | A | H | A | H | H | H | H | A | A | H | H | A | H | A | H | A | H | A | H | A |
| Result | L | L | D | D | L | W | W | W | W | W | W | D | D | D | W | W | D | D | W | W | L | L | L | L | W | D | W | L | W | L | D | W | W | L |

Updated to match(es) played on October 29, 2018. Source: Schedule
A = Away; H = Home; W = Win; D = Draw; L = Loss

===== Results by location =====
| Overall | | | | | | | | Home | | | | | | Away | | | | | |
| Pld | W | D | L | GF | GA | GD | Pts | W | D | L | GF | GA | GD | W | D | L | GF | GA | GD |
|---|---|---|---|---|---|---|---|---|---|---|---|---|---|---|---|---|---|---|---|
| 34 | 15 | 9 | 10 | 54 | 48 | +6 | 54 | 11 | 4 | 2 | 30 | 13 | +17 | 4 | 5 | 8 | 24 | 35 | −11 |

Last updated: October 29, 2018.
Source: MLS Regular Season

==== Cascadia Cup ====
The Cascadia Cup is a trophy that was created in 2004 by supporters of the Portland Timbers, Seattle Sounders FC and Vancouver Whitecaps FC. It is awarded to the club with the best record in MLS regular-season games versus the other participants. The Portland Timbers are the current Champions. Due to the offset schedule for the 2018 MLS season, the May 13 match against Seattle does not count towards the Cascadia Cup.

===== Standings =====
| Pos | Team | GP | W | L | D | GF | GA | GD | Pts |
|---|---|---|---|---|---|---|---|---|---|
| 1 | Seattle Sounders FC | 4 | 3 | 1 | 0 | 7 | 4 | +3 | 9 |
| 2 | Vancouver Whitecaps FC | 4 | 2 | 2 | 0 | 5 | 6 | -1 | 6 |
| 3 | Portland Timbers | 4 | 1 | 3 | 0 | 5 | 7 | -2 | 3 |

Last updated: October 29, 2018.

===== Matches =====
Win Draw Loss Upcoming fixture

| June 30, 2018 15 Cascadia Cup | Seattle Sounders FC | 2–3 | Portland Timbers | Seattle, Washington |
| 13:30 PST | Rodríguez 51' (Lodeiro); Marshall 68' (Lodeiro); Tolo (yellow card) 85'; Dempsey (yellow card) 89'; Kee-Hee (yellow card) 90' | Report | Mabiala 48' (Valeri) 74' (Valeri); Armenteros 57' (Valeri); Valentin (yellow card) 87' | Stadium: CenturyLink Field; Attendance: 47,521; Referee: Ismail Elfath |

| August 11, 2018 21 Cascadia Cup | Portland Timbers | 1–2 | Vancouver Whitecaps FC | Portland, Oregon |
| 20:00 PST | Valeri 71' (PK); Guzmán (yellow card) 74' | Report | K. Kamara 14' (Waston); Techera 43' (Shea) (yellow card) 45+1'; Shea (yellow card) 50' | Stadium: Providence Park; Attendance: 21,144; Referee: Jair Marrufo |

| August 26, 2018 24 Cascadia Cup | Portland Timbers | 0–1 | Seattle Sounders FC | Portland, Oregon |
| 18:30 PST | Chará (yellow card) 22'; Blanco (yellow card) 65'; Asprilla (yellow card) 87' | Preview | Smith (yellow card) 65'; Cascante 76' (o.g) | Stadium: Providence Park; Attendance: 21,144; Referee: Chris Penso |

| October 28, 2018 34 Cascadia Cup | Vancouver Whitecaps FC | 2–1 | Portland Timbers | Vancouver, British Columbia, Canada |
| 13:30 PST | Davies 28' (Nerwinski) 31' (yellow card) 82' | Report | Melano (yellow card) 27'; Flores 90' | Stadium: BC Place; Attendance: 25,348; Referee: Ted Unkel |

=== MLS Cup Playoffs ===
| October 31, 2018 Knockout | FC Dallas | 1–2 | Portland Timbers | Frisco, Texas |
| 18:30 PST | Urruti (yellow card) 22'; Gruezo (yellow card) 45+6'; Hedges 90+4' (Mosquera, Lamah) | Report | Valeri 23', 71' (Ebobisse); Ridgewell (yellow card) 38'; Chara (yellow card) 45+6'; Mabiala (red card) 58' | Stadium: Toyota Stadium; Attendance: 10,297; Referee: Alan Kelly |

| November 4, 2018 Semifinals Leg 1 | Portland Timbers | 2–1 | Seattle Sounders FC | Portland, Oregon |
| 14:30 PST | Ebobisse 17' (Valeri); Blanco 29' | Report | Ruidíaz 10' (Roldan, Rodríguez); Svensson (yellow card) 85' | Stadium: Providence Park; Attendance: 21,144; Referee: Ted Unkel |
Note: Portland Timbers lead 2–1 on aggregate.

| November 8, 2018 Semifinals Leg 2 | Seattle Sounders FC | 3–2 (a.e.t.) (2–4 p) | Portland Timbers | Seattle, Washington |
| 19:30 PST | Ruidíaz 68' 90+3' (yellow card) 114'; Alonso (yellow card) 70'; Lodeiro 97' (PK) | Report | Blanco 78' (Asprilla); Asprilla 93' (Valeri); Valeri (yellow card) 96' | Stadium: CenturyLink Field; Attendance: 39,542; Referee: Jair Marrufo |
| | Penalties |
| | Ruidíaz (penalty scored); Bruin (penalty missed); Alonso (penalty missed); Bwana (penalty scored) | | Melano (penalty scored); Valeri (penalty scored); Blanco (penalty scored); Ridgewell (penalty missed); Asprilla (penalty scored) |
Note: The Seattle Sounders won 3–2 in Leg 2, however, the aggregate score finished 4–4 (a.e.t.), and the Timbers won 4–2 on penalty kicks. In the two legged playoff format used in 2018, MLS did not use away goals as a tiebreaker after extra time.

| November 25, 2018 Conference Finals Leg 1 | Portland Timbers | 0–0 | Sporting Kansas City | Portland, Oregon |
| 16:30 PST | Guzmán (yellow card) 36' | Report | Sinovic (yellow card) 45+1'; Besler (yellow card) 66'; Sallói (yellow card) 89' | Stadium: Providence Park; Attendance: 21,144; Referee: Robert Sibiga |

| November 29, 2018 Conference Finals Leg 2 | Sporting Kansas City | 2–3 (2–3 agg.) | Portland Timbers | Kansas City, Kansas |
| 18:30 PST | Sallói 20' (Rubio); Rubio (yellow card) 47'; Fernandes 81' | Report | Valentin (yellow card) 17'; Guzmán (yellow card) 45+5'; Blanco 52' (Villafaña); Valeri 61', 90+9' (Chará); Chara (yellow card) 77'; Villafaña (yellow card) 90+6'; Asprilla (yellow card) 90+7' | Stadium: Children's Mercy Park; Attendance: 20,091; Referee: Mark Geiger |

| December 8, 2018 MLS Cup Final | Atlanta United FC | 2–0 | Portland Timbers | Atlanta, Georgia |
| 17:00 PST | Martínez 39'; Escobar 54' (Martínez, Almirón); McCann (yellow card) 90+4' | Report | Chará (yellow card) 80' | Stadium: Mercedes-Benz Stadium; Attendance: 73,019; Referee: Alan Kelly |

=== U.S. Open Cup ===
The Timbers and all other MLS clubs join the U.S. Open Cup in round 4.

Win Draw Loss Upcoming fixture

| June 6, 2018 4 U.S. Open Cup | Portland Timbers | 2–0 | San Jose Earthquakes | Portland, Oregon |
| 19:30 PST | Ebobisse 28'; Asprilla 66' (Chara) | Report | Alashe (yellow card) 41'; Ockford (yellow card) 54' | Stadium: Providence Park; Attendance: 12,769; Referee: Farhad Dadkho |

| June 15, 2018 Round of 16 | Portland Timbers | 1–0 | LA Galaxy | Portland, Oregon |
| 20:00 PST | Blanco 30' (Adi); Asprilla (yellow card) 90+2' | Report | Kitchen (yellow card) 42'; Carrasco (yellow card) 62' | Stadium: Providence Park; Attendance: 14,556; Referee: Joseph Dickerson |

| July 18, 2018 Quarterfinal | Los Angeles FC | 3–2 | Portland Timbers | Los Angeles, California |
| 19:30 PST | Harvey (yellow card) 10'; Guzmán 33' (o.g.); Vela 38' (Zimmerman); Ureña 51' (Jordan Harvey); Nguyen (yellow card) 57' | Report | Andriuskevicius (yellow card) 31'; Blanco (yellow card) 44'; Cascante 45+2' (Guzmán); Andriuskevicius 52' (Asprilla); Valentin (yellow card) 67'; Guzmán (yellow card) 83'; Cascante (yellow card) 90+3' | Stadium: Banc of California; Attendance: 17,898; Referee: Ramy Touchan |

== Player/Staff Transactions ==
Per league and club policy, terms of the deals are not disclosed except Targeted Allocation Money, General Allocation Money, draft picks, and international rosters spots.

=== Transfers in ===
| Date | Position | Player | Previous club | TAM | GAM | Notes | Source |
Winter
| January 4, 2018 | DF | (Costa Rica) Julio Cascante | (Costa Rica) Saprissa | N/A | N/A | | |
| January 17, 2018 | FW | (United States) Foster Langsdorf | N/A | N/A | N/A | Signed as Home Grown Player | |
| January 23, 2018 | MF | (United States) Eryk Williamson | (United States) D.C. United | $100,000 | $100,000 | A 2018 international spot and a 2nd round pick in the 2020 MLS SuperDraft. TAM to be paid in 2019. | |
| January 24, 2017 | MF | (El Salvador) Andrés Flores | (United States) New York Cosmos | N/A | N/A | Free Transfer | |
| January 24, 2017 | DF | (The Gambia) Modou Jadama | (United States) Tulsa Roughnecks | N/A | N/A | Free Transfer | |
Summer
| August 8, 2018 | LB | (United States) Jorge Villafaña | (Mexico) Santos Laguna | $100,000 | $75,000 | TAM/GAM to LA Galaxy for Allocaiton. TAM to be paid in 2019. | |
| August 9, 2018 | FW | (Argentina) Lucas Melano | (Argentina) Estudiantes | - | - | End of loan. | |
| August 17, 2018 | GK | (United States) Steve Clark | Free transfer | - | - | Signed off waivers from D.C. United. | |

=== Loans in ===
| Date | Position | Player | Parent Club | TAM | GAM | Notes | Source |
Winter
| January 17, 2018 | DF | (Peru) Andy Polo | (Mexico) Morelia | N/A | N/A | On loan for the 2018 MLS campaign with purchase option. | |
| February 4, 2018 | FW | (Paraguay) Cristhian Paredes | (Mexico) América | N/A | N/A | On loan for the 2018 MLS campaign with purchase option. | |
| February 9, 2018 | FW | (Sweden) Samuel Armenteros | (Italy) Benevento | N/A | N/A | On loan for the 2018 MLS campaign with purchase option. | |
Summer
| July 17, 2018 | MF | (Argentina) Tomás Conechny | (Argentina) San Lorenzo | N/A | N/A | On loan for the 2018 MLS campaign with purchase option. | |

=== Loans out ===
| Date | Position | Player | Loaned Club | TAM | GAM | Notes | Source |
Summer
| August 28, 2018 | MF | (United States) Eryk Williamson | (Portugal) C.D. Santa Clara | N/A | N/A | On loan for the club's 2018–19 season | |

=== Transfers out ===
| Date | Position | Player | Destination Club | TAM | GAM | Notes | Source |
Winter
| November 27, 2017 | MF | (United States) Amobi Okugo | | N/A | N/A | Option declined. | |
| November 27, 2017 | FW | (Jamaica) Darren Mattocks | (United States) D.C. United | N/A | N/A | ~~Option declined, in discussions.~~ On December 10, 2017, he was traded to D.C. United in exchange for international roster spot. | |
| November 27, 2017 | DF | (New Zealand) ~~Bill Tuiloma~~ | | N/A | N/A | ~~Option Declined with bona fide offer.~~ Re-signed. | |
| November 27, 2017 | MF | (United States) Ben Zemanski | (United States) Pittsburgh Riverhounds SC | N/A | N/A | Out of contract. | |
| December 13, 2017 | MF | (United States) Darlington Nagbe | (United States) Atlanta United FC | $300,000 | $750,000 | Traded. Will pay $100,000 of GAM in 2019. | |
| December 13, 2017 | DF | (Nigeria) Gbenga Arokoyo | (United States) Atlanta United FC | | | Part of the Nagbe Trade. | |
| February 12, 2018 | DF | (Jamaica) Rennico Clarke | (Iceland) Fimleikafélag Hafnarfjarðar | | | Waived. | |
| February 28, 2018 | DF | (United States) Chance Myers | | | | Waived. | |
Summer
| July 30, 2018 | CF | (Nigeria) Fanendo Adi | (United States) FC Cincinnati | $400,000 | $450,000 | Future considerations part of deal | |
| August 8, 2018 | LB | (Lithuania) Vytautas Andriuškevičius | (United States) D.C. United | $50,000 | - | | |

=== Contract extensions ===
| Date | Position | Player | Year Signed | Extension | Notes | Source |
|---|---|---|---|---|---|---|
| November 27, 2017 | GK | (United States) Jeff Attinella | 2017 | Unknown | | |
| November 27, 2017 | GK | (United States) Kendall McIntosh | 2017 | Unknown | | |
| November 27, 2017 | DF | (United States) Zarek Valentin | 2016 | Unknown | | |
| November 27, 2017 | MF | (Colombia) Dairon Asprilla | 2014 | Unknown | | |
| November 27, 2017 | MF/DF | (England) Jack Barmby | 2016 | Unknown | | |
| January 17, 2018 | DF | (New Zealand) Bill Tuiloma | 2017 | 1 Year | | |

=== 2017 MLS Re-Entry Draft Picks ===
| Stage | Position | Player | Previous club | Notes | Ref |
|---|---|---|---|---|---|
| 1 (1 / #17) | | PASS | | | |
| 2 (1 / #17) | | PASS | | | |

=== 2018 MLS SuperDraft Picks ===
| Round | Player | Position | College | Other | Notes | Ref |
|---|---|---|---|---|---|---|
| 1 (18) | – | – | – | – | Given to Sporting KC in a trade. (Note: #18: Portland Timbers → Sporting Kansas City. February 3, 2017: Sporting Kansas City acquired a first-round selection in the 2018 SuperDraft and $50,000 in general allocation money from Portland Timbers in exchange for defender Lawrence Olum.) | |
| 2 (41) | – | – | – | – | Given to Minnesota United FC in a trade. (Note: #41: Portland Timbers → Minnesota United. December 20, 2016: Minnesota United FC acquired a second-round selection in the 2018 SuperDraft from Portland Timbers in exchange for goalkeeper Jeff Attinella.) | |
| 3 (61) | (United States) Caleb Duvernay | DF | (United States) NC State | (United States) North Carolina FC U23 | Acquired pick from Chicago Fire. (Note: #61: Chicago Fire → Portland Timbers. August 11, 2017: Portland Timbers acquired a conditional third-round selection in the 2018 SuperDraft and the #19 spot in the Allocation Order from Chicago Fire in exchange for the #6 spot in the Allocation Order. Chicago used the allocation spot to sign goalkeeper Richard Sánchez, who appeared in 2 games in the 2017 MLS season. Had Sanchez appeared in five or more games Portland would have instead received Chicago's natural second-round selection.) | |
| 3 (63) | (United States) Timmy Mueller | FW | (United States) Oregon State | (United States) Portland Timbers U23 | Acquired pick from Real Salt Lake for rights (Note: #63: Vancouver Whitecaps → Real Salt Lake → Portland Timbers. December 15, 2017: Portland Timbers acquired a third-round selection in the 2018 SuperDraft from Real Salt Lake in exchange for the MLS rights to defender Taylor Peay. On August 9, 2017, Real Salt Lake had acquired this third-round selection in the 2018 SuperDraft from Vancouver Whitecaps FC in exchange for defender Aaron Maund.) | |
| 3 (64) | (New Zealand) Stuart Holthusen | FW | (United States) Akron | | | |
| 4 (87) | (Guinea) Mamadou Guirassy | FW | (United States) NJIT | (United States) Jersey Express S.C. | | |

=== Staff in ===
| Date | Name | Position | Previous club | Previous Position | Ref |
|---|---|---|---|---|---|
| December 18, 2017 | (Venezuela) Giovanni Savarese | Head coach | (United States) New York Cosmos | Manager | |
| January 8, 2018 | (Colombia) Carlos Llamosa | Assistant coach | (United States) New England Revolution | Assistant coach | |
| January 8, 2018 | (Colombia) Guillermo "Memo" Valencia | Goalkeeper coach | (United States) New York Cosmos | Goalkeeper coach | |

=== Staff out ===
| Date | Name | Former Position | New Club | New Position | Ref |
|---|---|---|---|---|---|
| December 18, 2017 | (United States) Caleb Porter | Head coach | – | – | |
| August 2, 2018 | (England) Sean McAuley | Assistant coach | (United States) Orlando City SC | Assistant coach | |

== Honors and awards ==
=== MLS Player of the Week ===
| Week | Player | Ref |
|---|---|---|
| 7 | (Jamaica) Alvas Powell | |
| 28 | (Argentina) Sebastián Blanco | |

=== MLS Goal of the Week ===
| Week | Result | Player | Ref |
|---|---|---|---|
| 4 | Nominated | (Argentina) Sebastián Blanco | |
| 7 | Won | (Jamaica) Alvas Powell | |
| 8 | Nominated | (Argentina) Diego Valeri | |
| 12 | Won | (Sweden) Samuel Armenteros | |
| 13 | Won | (Sweden) Samuel Armenteros | |
| 30 | Nominated | (Jamaica) Alvas Powell | |
| 32 | Nominated | (Argentina) Sebastián Blanco | |

=== MLS Team of the Week ===
| Week | Area | Player/Manager | Ref |
|---|---|---|---|
| 4 | Pitch | (New Zealand) Bill Tuiloma | |
| 7 | Pitch | (Jamaica) Alvas Powell | |
| 8 | Pitch | (Democratic Republic of the Congo) Larrys Mabiala | |
| 8 | Pitch | (Venezuela) Giovanni Savarese | |
| 13 | Pitch | (Sweden) Samuel Armenteros | |
| 17 | Pitch | (United States) Jeff Attinella | |
| 18 | Pitch | (Argentina) Diego Valeri | |
| 18 | Pitch | (Democratic Republic of the Congo) Larrys Mabiala | |
| 19 | Pitch | (Sweden) Samuel Armenteros | |
| 19 | Pitch | (Argentina) Diego Valeri | |
| 20 | Pitch | (Colombia) Diego Chará | |
| 22 | Bench | (Nigeria) Fanendo Adi | |
| 23 | Bench | (United States) Jeff Attinella | |
| 23 | Bench | (Argentina) Diego Valeri | |
| 27 | Bench | (Colombia) Diego Chará | |
| 28 | Pitch | (United States) Jeremy Ebobisse | |
| 28 | Pitch | (Argentina) Sebastián Blanco | |
| 28 | Pitch | (United States) Zarek Valentin | |
| 28 | Bench | (Colombia) Diego Chará | |
| 28 | Bench | (Argentina) Diego Valeri | |
| 30 | Bench | (Peru) Andy Polo | |
| 32 | Pitch | (Argentina) Sebastián Blanco | |
| 34 | Pitch | (Argentina) Sebastián Blanco | |

== Statistics ==
=== Appearances ===
Numbers in parentheses denote appearances as a substitute.

(T2) = Players called up from Portland Timbers 2 for short-term contracts.

| No. | Pos. | Name | MLS | | | | MLS Playoffs | | | | U.S. Open Cup | | | | Total | | | |
| No. | Pos. | Name | Apps | Goals | Yellow card | Red card | Apps | Goals | Yellow card | Red card | Apps | Goals | Yellow card | Red card | Apps | Goals | Yellow card | Red card |
|---|---|---|---|---|---|---|---|---|---|---|---|---|---|---|---|---|---|---|
| 1 | GK | (United States) Jeff Attinella | 22 | 0 | 0 | 0 | 6 | 0 | 0 | 0 | 2 | 0 | 0 | 0 | 30 | 0 | 0 | 0 |
| 2 | DF | (Jamaica) Alvas Powell | 24 | 2 | 1 | 0 | 1 (2) | 0 | 0 | 0 | 0 (1) | 0 | 1 | 0 | 25 (3) | 2 | 0 | 0 |
| 4 | DF | (United States) Jorge Villafaña | 7 (1) | 0 | 0 | 0 | 6 | 0 | 1 | 0 | 0 | 0 | 0 | 0 | 13 (1) | 0 | 1 | 0 |
| 7 | DF | (Costa Rica) Roy Miller | 0 | 0 | 0 | 0 | 0 | 0 | 0 | 0 | 0 | 0 | 0 | 0 | 0 | 0 | 0 | 0 |
| 8 | MF | (Argentina) Diego Valeri | 31 (1) | 10 | 4 | 0 | 6 | 4 | 1 | 0 | 0 (1) | 0 | 0 | 0 | 37 (2) | 14 | 5 | 0 |
| 10 | MF | (Argentina) Sebastián Blanco | 29 (2) | 10 | 9 | 0 | 6 | 3 | 0 | 0 | 2 | 1 | 1 | 0 | 37 (2) | 14 | 9 | 0 |
| 11 | FW | (Peru) Andy Polo | 18 (5) | 1 | 2 | 0 | 5 | 0 | 0 | 0 | 1 | 0 | 0 | 0 | 24 (5) | 1 | 2 | 0 |
| 12 | GK | (United States) Steve Clark | 6 (2) | 0 | 1 | 0 | 0 | 0 | 0 | 0 | 0 | 0 | 0 | 0 | 6 (2) | 0 | 1 | 0 |
| 13 | DF | (Kenya) Lawrence Olum | 18 (4) | 1 | 2 | 1 | 0 (4) | 0 | 0 | 0 | 2 (1) | 0 | 0 | 0 | 20 (9) | 1 | 2 | 1 |
| 14 | DF | (El Salvador) Andrés Flores | 14 (15) | 1 | 1 | 0 | 1 | 0 | 1 | 0 | 1 | 0 | 0 | 0 | 16 (15) | 1 | 2 | 0 |
| 16 | DF | (United States) Zarek Valentin | 30 (2) | 0 | 4 | 0 | 5 (1) | 0 | 1 | 0 | 2 | 0 | 1 | 0 | 37 (3) | 0 | 6 | 0 |
| 17 | FW | (United States) Jeremy Ebobisse | 5 (4) | 2 | 1 | 0 | 6 | 1 | 0 | 0 | 1 | 1 | 0 | 0 | 12 (4) | 4 | 1 | 0 |
| 18 | DF | (Costa Rica) Julio Cascante | 18 (3) | 0 | 1 | 0 | 0 | 0 | 0 | 0 | 1 | 1 | 1 | 0 | 19 (3) | 1 | 2 | 0 |
| 19 | FW | (Colombia) Victor Arboleda | 0 (1) | 0 | 0 | 0 | 0 | 0 | 0 | 0 | 0 | 0 | 0 | 0 | 0 (1) | 0 | 0 | 0 |
| 19 | MF | (Argentina) Tomás Conechny | 1 (3) | 0 | 0 | 0 | 0 | 0 | 0 | 0 | 0 | 0 | 0 | 0 | 1 (3) | 0 | 0 | 0 |
| 20 | MF | (Costa Rica) David Guzmán | 11 (3) | 3 | 4 | 0 | 5 | 0 | 2 | 0 | 1 | 0 | 1 | 0 | 17 (3) | 3 | 7 | 0 |
| 21 | MF | (Colombia) Diego Chará | 26 (1) | 2 | 11 | 0 | 6 | 0 | 3 | 0 | 2 | 0 | 0 | 0 | 34 (1) | 2 | 14 | 0 |
| 22 | MF | (Paraguay) Cristhian Paredes | 18 (1) | 1 | 1 | 0 | 0 | 0 | 0 | 0 | 1 (1) | 0 | 0 | 0 | 19 (2) | 1 | 1 | 0 |
| 23 | MF | (England) Jack Barmby | 0 | 0 | 0 | 0 | 0 | 0 | 0 | 0 | 1 | 0 | 0 | 0 | 1 | 0 | 0 | 0 |
| 24 | DF | (England) Liam Ridgewell | 13 | 0 | 2 | 1 | 6 | 0 | 1 | 0 | 0 | 0 | 0 | 0 | 19 | 0 | 3 | 1 |
| 25 | DF | (New Zealand) Bill Tuiloma | 7 (6) | 1 | 0 | 0 | 2 (2) | 0 | 0 | 0 | 3 | 0 | 0 | 0 | 12 (8) | 1 | 0 | 0 |
| 26 | FW | (Argentina) Lucas Melano | 1 (6) | 1 | 1 | 0 | 0 (4) | 0 | 0 | 0 | 0 | 0 | 0 | 0 | 1 (10) | 1 | 1 | 0 |
| 26 | DF | (The Gambia) Modou Jadama | 0 (1) | 0 | 0 | 0 | 0 | 0 | 0 | 0 | 1 | 0 | 0 | 0 | 1 (1) | 0 | 0 | 0 |
| 27 | MF | (Colombia) Dairon Asprilla | 7 (10) | 1 | 3 | 0 | 1 (4) | 1 | 1 | 0 | 2 (1) | 1 | 1 | 0 | 10 (15) | 3 | 5 | 0 |
| 28 | FW | (United States) Foster Langsdorf | 0 | 0 | 0 | 0 | 0 | 0 | 0 | 0 | 0 (1) | 0 | 0 | 0 | 0 (1) | 0 | 0 | 0 |
| 30 | MF | (United States) Eryk Williamson | 0 | 0 | 0 | 0 | 0 | 0 | 0 | 0 | 0 (1) | 0 | 0 | 0 | 0 (1) | 0 | 0 | 0 |
| 32 | DF | (United States) Marco Farfan | 6 (5) | 0 | 0 | 0 | 0 | 0 | 0 | 0 | 0 | 0 | 0 | 0 | 6 (5) | 0 | 0 | 0 |
| 33 | DF | (Democratic Republic of the Congo) Larrys Mabiala | 31 | 5 | 5 | 0 | 4 | 0 | 0 | 1 | 1 | 0 | 0 | 0 | 36 | 5 | 5 | 1 |
| 40 | MF | (Venezuela) Renzo Zambrano (T2) | 0 | 0 | 0 | 0 | 0 | 0 | 0 | 0 | 1 | 0 | 0 | 0 | 1 | 0 | 0 | 0 |
| 43 | GK | (United States) Kendall McIntosh | 0 | 0 | 0 | 0 | 0 | 0 | 0 | 0 | 1 | 0 | 0 | 0 | 1 | 0 | 0 | 0 |
| 44 | MF | (Costa Rica) Marvin Loría (T2) | 0 | 0 | 0 | 0 | 0 | 0 | 0 | 0 | 1 | 0 | 0 | 0 | 1 | 0 | 0 | 0 |
| 47 | MF | (Honduras) Darixon Vuelto (T2) | 0 | 0 | 0 | 0 | 0 | 0 | 0 | 0 | 0 (1) | 0 | 0 | 0 | 0 (1) | 0 | 0 | 0 |
| 77 | MF | (Jamaica) Andre Lewis (T2) | 0 | 0 | 0 | 0 | 0 | 0 | 0 | 0 | 0 | 0 | 0 | 0 | 0 | 0 | 0 | 0 |
| 90 | GK | (New Zealand) Jake Gleeson | 6 | 0 | 1 | 0 | 0 | 0 | 0 | 0 | 0 | 0 | 0 | 0 | 6 | 0 | 1 | 0 |
| 99 | FW | (Sweden) Samuel Armenteros | 19 (9) | 8 | 2 | 0 | 0 | 0 | 0 | 0 | 1 (1) | 0 | 0 | 0 | 20 (10) | 8 | 2 | 0 |
Players who were transferred/waived from the club during active season or on loan
| | DF | (Lithuania) Vytautas Andriuškevičius | 0 (3) | 0 | 0 | 0 | 0 | 0 | 0 | 0 | 3 | 1 | 1 | 0 | 3 (3) | 1 | 1 | 0 |
| | FW | (Nigeria) Fanendo Adi | 9 (5) | 3 | 0 | 0 | 0 | 0 | 0 | 0 | 1 | 0 | 0 | 0 | 10 (5) | 3 | 0 | 0 |

Last updated: December 10, 2018.
Source: MLSSoccer.com

=== Goalkeeper stats ===
The list is sorted by total minutes played then by jersey number.

| No. | Player | MLS | | | | MLS Playoffs | | | | U.S. Open Cup | | | | Total | | | |
| No. | Player | MIN | GA | GAA | SV | MIN | GA | GAA | SV | MIN | GA | GAA | SV | MIN | GA | GAA | SV |
| 1 | (United States) Jeff Attinella | 1944 | 23 | 1.06 | 64 | 570 | 9 | 1.42 | 19 | 180 | 3 | 1.50 | 7 | 2694 | 35 | 1.17 | 90 |
| 12 | (United States) Steve Clark | 576 | 11 | 1.72 | 28 | 0 | 0 | 0.00 | 0 | 0 | 0 | 0.00 | 0 | 576 | 11 | 1.72 | 28 |
| 90 | (New Zealand) Jake Gleeson | 540 | 14 | 2.33 | 15 | 0 | 0 | 0.00 | 0 | 0 | 0 | 0.00 | 0 | 540 | 14 | 2.33 | 15 |
| 43 | (United States) Kendall McIntosh | 0 | 0 | 0.00 | 0 | 0 | 0 | 0.00 | 0 | 90 | 0 | 0.00 | 1 | 90 | 0 | 0.00 | 1 |
| | TOTALS | 3060 | 48 | 1.41 | 107 | 570 | 9 | 1.42 | 19 | 270 | 3 | 1.00 | 8 | 3900 | 60 | 1.13 | 134 |

Last updated: December 10, 2018.
Source: MLSSoccer.com

=== Top scorers ===
The list is sorted by shirt number when total goals are equal.

| Rnk | Pos | No. | Player | MLS | MLS Cup Playoffs | U.S. Open Cup | Total |
|---|---|---|---|---|---|---|---|
| 1 | MF/FW | 10 | (Argentina) Sebastián Blanco | 10 | 3 | 1 | 14 |
| 1 | MF | 8 | (Argentina) Diego Valeri | 10 | 4 | 0 | 14 |
| 2 | FW | 99 | (Sweden) Samuel Armenteros | 8 | 0 | 0 | 8 |
| 3 | DF | 33 | (Democratic Republic of the Congo) Larrys Mabiala | 5 | 0 | 0 | 5 |
| 4 | FW | 17 | (United States) Jeremy Ebobisse | 2 | 1 | 1 | 4 |
| 5 | FW | 9 | (Nigeria) Fanendo Adi | 3 | 0 | 0 | 3 |
| 5 | MF | 20 | (Costa Rica) David Guzmán | 3 | 0 | 0 | 3 |
| 5 | MF/FW | 27 | (Colombia) Dairon Asprilla | 1 | 1 | 1 | 3 |
| 6 | DF | 2 | (Jamaica) Alvas Powell | 2 | 0 | 0 | 2 |
| 6 | MF | 21 | (Colombia) Diego Chará | 2 | 0 | 0 | 2 |
| 7 | DF | 5 | (Lithuania) Vytautas Andriuskevicius | 0 | 0 | 1 | 1 |
| 7 | MF | 11 | (Peru) Andy Polo | 1 | 0 | 0 | 1 |
| 7 | DF/MF | 13 | (Kenya) Lawrence Olum | 1 | 0 | 0 | 1 |
| 7 | MF/FW | 14 | (El Salvador) Andrés Flores | 1 | 0 | 0 | 1 |
| 7 | DF | 18 | (Costa Rica) Julio Cascante | 0 | 0 | 1 | 1 |
| 7 | MF | 22 | (Paraguay) Cristhian Paredes | 1 | 0 | 0 | 1 |
| 7 | DF/MF | 25 | (New Zealand) Bill Tuiloma | 1 | 0 | 0 | 1 |
| 7 | FW | 26 | (Argentina) Lucas Melano | 1 | 0 | 0 | 1 |
| Own goals | | | | 2 | 0 | 0 | 2 |
| TOTALS | | | | 56 | 9 | 5 | 70 |

Last updated: December 10, 2018.
Source: Portland Timbers

=== Top assists ===
The list is sorted by shirt number when total assists are equal.

| Rnk | Pos | No. | Player | MLS | MLS Cup Playoffs | U.S. Open Cup | Total |
|---|---|---|---|---|---|---|---|
| 1 | MF | 8 | (Argentina) Diego Valeri | 12 | 2 | 0 | 14 |
| 2 | MF/FW | 10 | (Argentina) Sebastián Blanco | 11 | 0 | 0 | 11 |
| 3 | FW | 9 | (Nigeria) Fanendo Adi | 2 | 0 | 1 | 3 |
| 3 | MF | 22 | (Paraguay) Cristhian Paredes | 3 | 0 | 0 | 3 |
| 3 | 2 | DF | (Jamaica) Alvas Powell | 3 | 0 | 0 | 3 |
| 4 | DF | 4 | (United States) Jorge Villafaña | 1 | 1 | 0 | 2 |
| 4 | MF | 11 | (Peru) Andy Polo | 2 | 0 | 0 | 2 |
| 4 | MF | 14 | (El Salvador) Andrés Flores | 2 | 0 | 0 | 2 |
| 4 | FW | 17 | (United States) Jeremy Ebobisse | 1 | 1 | 0 | 2 |
| 4 | MF | 20 | (Costa Rica) David Guzmán | 1 | 0 | 1 | 2 |
| 4 | MF | 21 | (Colombia) Diego Chará | 0 | 1 | 1 | 2 |
| 4 | MF/FW | 27 | (Colombia) Dairon Asprilla | 0 | 1 | 1 | 2 |
| 5 | DF | 16 | (United States) Zarek Valentin | 1 | 0 | 0 | 1 |
| 5 | DF | 18 | (Costa Rica) Julio Cascante | 1 | 0 | 0 | 1 |
| 5 | FW/MF | 26 | (Argentina) Lucas Melano | 1 | 0 | 0 | 1 |
| 5 | MF | 33 | (Democratic Republic of the Congo) Larrys Mabiala | 1 | 0 | 0 | 1 |
| 5 | FW | 99 | (Sweden) Samuel Armenteros | 1 | 0 | 0 | 1 |
| TOTALS | | | | 43 | 6 | 4 | 53 |

Last updated: December 10, 2018.
Source: Portland Timbers

=== Clean sheets ===
The list is sorted by shirt number when total clean sheets are equal.

| Rnk | No. | Player | MLS | MLS Cup Playoffs | U.S. Open Cup | Total |
|---|---|---|---|---|---|---|
| 1 | 1 | (United States) Jeff Attinella | 7 | 1 | 1 | 9 |
| 2 | 12 | (United States) Steve Clark | 3 | 0 | 0 | 3 |
| 2 | 43 | (United States) Kendall McIntosh | 0 | 0 | 1 | 1 |
| 3 | 90 | (New Zealand) Jake Gleeson | 0 | 0 | 0 | 0 |
| TOTALS | | | 10 | 1 | 2 | 13 |

Last updated: December 10, 2018.
Source: Portland Timbers

=== Summary ===
| Games played | 43 (34 MLS) (3 Open Cup) (6 MLS Playoffs) |
| Games won | 20 (15 MLS) (2 Open Cup) (3 MLS Playoffs) |
| Games drawn | 10 (9 MLS) (1 MLS Playoffs) |
| Games lost | 13 (10 MLS) (1 Open Cup) (2 MLS Playoffs) |
| Goals scored | 68 (54 MLS) (5 Open Cup) (9 MLS Playoffs) |
| Goals conceded | 56 (44 MLS) (3 Open Cup) (9 MLS Playoffs) |
| Goal difference | +12 (+10 MLS) (+2 Open Cup) (0 MLS Playoffs) |
| Clean sheets | 13 (10 MLS) (2 Open Cup) (1 MLS Playoffs) |
| Yellow cards | 74 (57 MLS) (6 Open Cup) (11 MLS Playoffs) |
| Red cards | 3 (2 MLS) (1 MLS Playoffs) |
| Most appearances | (United States) Zarek Valentin (40 Appearances) |
| Top scorer | (Argentina) Diego Valeri, (Argentina) Sebastián Blanco (14 goals) |
| Top assists | (Argentina) Diego Valeri (14 assists) |
| Top clean sheets | (United States) Jeff Attinella (8 clean sheets) |
| Winning percentage | Overall: 20/43 (46.51%) |

Last updated: December 10, 2018.
Source: Portland Timbers
