= 2021 Portland Timbers season =

Portland Timbers
2021 season
- President: Merritt Paulson
- Head coach: Giovanni Savarese
- Stadium: Providence Park; Portland, Oregon (Capacity: 25,218)
- Major League Soccer: Conference: 4th Overall: 5th
- MLS Cup Playoffs: Runners-up
- U.S. Open Cup: Canceled
- CONCACAF Champions League: Quarter-finals
- Highest home attendance: Felipe Mora (11)
- Lowest home attendance: Felipe Mora (15)
- Biggest win: League/All: POR 5–0 MAR (4/13, CCL); POR 6–1 RSL (9/25, MLS)
- Biggest defeat: League/All: SEA 6–2 POR (8/15)
Home colors	Secondary colors
- All statistics correct as of May 5, 2021.

The 2021 Portland Timbers season was the club's 35th season of existence and the 11th season for the Portland Timbers in Major League Soccer (MLS), the top-flight professional soccer league in the United States and Canada. The season covers the period from the end of the Timber's last match in MLS or MLS Playoffs in 2020 (November 22, 2020) to their final match in MLS Cup Plays on December 11, 2021.

== Background ==
The 2020 season was heavily altered due to the onset of the COVID-19 pandemic. Portland played its first two matches as scheduled, before the season was suspended on March 12, 2020. The season resumed with a bubble tournament near Orlando, Florida, dubbed the MLS is Back Tournament, which began on July 13, 2020, and concluded on August 11, 2020. Portland defeated Orlando City SC in the championship, and earned a berth into the 2021 CONCACAF Champions League for winning the tournament.

The league resumed, with Portland playing their remaining matches behind closed doors. The number of regular season matches from 2020 decreased from 34 to 23 due to the pandemic. Ultimately Portland finished with an 11–6–6 regular season record, and earned a berth into the 2020 MLS Cup Playoffs. Portland was defeated by FC Dallas in the opening round. Diego Valeri lead the team in MLS goals with six total, and Jeremy Ebobisse lead Portland in goals across all competitions with eight.

== Season review ==
The season was postponed from the normal late February 27–28 starting weekend and instead began on the weekend of April 16–18 due to the pandemic. Ahead of the start of the regular season, Portland began competitive fixtures in the Champions League on April 6, 2021.

== Non-competitive ==
=== Preseason friendlies ===
Win Draw Loss Upcoming fixture

March 16	Colorado Rapids	2–0	Portland Timbers	Tucson, Arizona
11:00 PST	Barrios 18'; Acosta 42'	Report		Stadium: Kino Sports Complex
Note: Match was 45 minutes long.

March 16	Phoenix Rising	0–1	Portland Timbers	Tucson, Arizona
13:00 PST		Report	25' (o.g.)	Stadium: Kino Sports Complex
Note: Match was 45 minutes long.

March 20	Phoenix Rising	1–3	Portland Timbers	Tucson, Arizona
15:00 PST	Quinn 34'	Report	Ikoba 17' (Bonilla); Valeri 59'; McGraw 60' (Valeri)	Stadium: Kino Sports Complex

March 24	Sporting Kansas City	3–3	Portland Timbers	Tucson, Arizona
11:00 PST	Shelton 44'; Harris 48'; Espinoza 64'	Report	Valeri 52'; Asprilla 66'; Tuiloma 88'	Stadium: Kino Sports Complex

March 30	Seattle Sounders FC	1–1	Portland Timbers	Tukwila, Washington
13:00 PST	Montero 62'	Report	Asprilla 85' (Y. Chara)	Stadium: Starfire Sports

March 30	Seattle Sounders FC	0–0	Portland Timbers	Tukwila, Washington
15:00 PST		Report		Stadium: Starfire Sports
Note: Match was 75 minutes long.

== Competitive ==
=== Major League Soccer ===
==== Standings ====
Western Conference

Pos	Team	Pld	W	L	T	GF	GA	GD	Pts	Qualification
1	Colorado Rapids	34	17	7	10	51	35	+16	61	Qualification for the Playoffs Conference semifinals and CONCACAF Champions League
2	Seattle Sounders FC	34	17	8	9	53	33	+20	60	Qualification for the Playoffs first round and CONCACAF Champions League
3	Sporting Kansas City	34	17	10	7	58	40	+18	58	Qualification for the Playoffs first round
4	Portland Timbers	34	17	13	4	56	52	+4	55	Qualification for the Playoffs first round
5	Minnesota United FC	34	13	11	10	42	44	−2	49	Qualification for the Playoffs first round
6	Vancouver Whitecaps FC (Note: Canadian clubs cannot qualify for the 2022 CONCACAF Champions League through the MLS regular season or playoffs.)	34	12	9	13	45	45	0	49	Qualification for the Playoffs first round
7	Real Salt Lake	34	14	14	6	55	54	+1	48	Qualification for the Playoffs first round
8	LA Galaxy	34	13	12	9	50	54	−4	48	
9	Los Angeles FC	34	12	13	9	53	51	+2	45	
10	San Jose Earthquakes	34	10	13	11	46	54	−8	41	
11	FC Dallas	34	7	15	12	47	56	−9	33	
12	Austin FC	34	9	21	4	35	56	−21	31	
13	Houston Dynamo FC	34	6	16	12	36	54	−18	30	

Source: MLS
Rules for classification: 1) points; 2) total wins; 3) total goal differential; 4) total goals scored; 5) fewer disciplinary points; 6) away goal differential; 7) away goals scored; 8) home goals differential; 9) home goals scored; 10) coin toss (2 clubs tied) or drawing of lots (≥3 clubs tied)
Notes:

Overall

Pos	Team	Pld	W	L	T	GF	GA	GD	Pts	Qualification
3	Seattle Sounders FC	34	17	8	9	53	33	+20	60	Qualification for the 2022 CONCACAF Champions League (Note: As highest-ranked U.S. based Division I club (based on 2021 MLS regular season record) not already qualified (USA4))
4	Sporting Kansas City	34	17	10	7	58	40	+18	58	
5	Portland Timbers	34	17	13	4	56	52	+4	55	
6	Philadelphia Union	34	14	8	12	48	35	+13	54	
7	Nashville SC	34	12	4	18	55	33	+22	54	

Source: MLS
Rules for classification: 1) points; 2) total wins; 3) total goal differential; 4) total goals scored; 5) fewer disciplinary points; 6) away goal differential; 7) away goals scored; 8) home goals differential; 9) home goals scored; 10) coin toss (2 clubs tied) or drawing of lots (≥3 clubs tied)

==== Matches ====
April 18 1	Vancouver Whitecaps FC	1–0	Portland Timbers	Sandy, Utah
19:00 PST	Veselinović (yellow card) 21'; Cavallini 49'; Baldisimo (yellow card) 64'	Report	Župarić (yellow card) 68'	Stadium: Rio Tinto Stadium; Attendance: 0 Referee: Allen Chapman

April 24 2	Portland Timbers	2–1	Houston Dynamo FC	Portland, Oregon
19:30 PST	Asprilla 6', (yellow card) 26'; Bravo (yellow card) 39'; Paredes 73'	Report	Paredes 28' (o.g.); Valentin (yellow card) 36'; Urruti (yellow card) 37'	Stadium: Providence Park; Referee: Ismail Elfath

May 1 3	FC Dallas	4–1	Portland Timbers	Frisco, Texas
17:00 PST	Ricaurte 2', (yellow card) 82'; Munjoma (yellow card) 12'; Obrian 14'; Bressan 45+3'; Hollingshead (yellow card) 78'; Sealy 85'	Report	Williamson 62'; Bodily (yellow card) 69'; Valeri (yellow card) 87'	Stadium: Toyota Stadium; Attendance: 8,621; Referee: Alan Kelly

May 9 4	Portland Timbers	1–2	Seattle Sounders FC	Portland, Oregon
12:00 PST	Loría (yellow card) 21'; Tuiloma 90+4'	Report	Tolo (yellow card) 17'; Ruidíaz 63' (pen.); Montero 79'; Delem (yellow card) 90+4'	Stadium: Providence Park; Referee: Chris Penso

May 15 5	San Jose Earthquakes	0–2	Portland Timbers	San Jose, California
19:00 PST	Wondolowski (yellow card) 45+3'	Report	Y. Chará 5'; Tuiloma (yellow card) 25'; Župarić (yellow card) 42'; Loría 74'	Stadium: PayPal Park; Referee: Rosendo Mendoza

May 22 6	Portland Timbers	3–0	LA Galaxy	Portland, Oregon
12:30 PST	Mora 47' 60'; Valeri 69'	Report	Williams (red card) 44'	Stadium: Providence Park; Attendance: unknown Referee: Alan Kelly

May 30 7	Philadelphia Union	3–0	Portland Timbers	Chester, Pennsylvania
14:30 PST	Mbaizo (yellow card) 5'; Przybyłko 26'; Santos 31'; Elliott 63'	Report	Župarić (yellow card) 62'; Bravo (yellow card) 72'	Stadium: Subaru Park; Attendance: 6,635; Referee: Robert Sibiga

June 19 8	Portland Timbers	2–1	Sporting Kansas City	Portland, Oregon
19:30 PST	Asprilla 36'; Župarić (yellow card) 38'; Loría 45+1'; Zambrano (yellow card) 87'	Report	Lindsey 28'; Fontàs (yellow card) 69'; Espinoza (yellow card) 74'; Ilie (yellow card) 83'	Stadium: Providence Park; Referee: Alan Kelly

June 23 9	Houston Dynamo FC	2–2	Portland Timbers	Houston, Texas
17:30 PST	Picault 15', (yellow card) 59'; Pasher 33'	Report	Bonilla (yellow card) 38'; Asprilla 50'; Mabiala (yellow card) 72'; Blanco (yellow card) 73'; Ebobisse 90+1'	Stadium: BBVA Stadium; Attendance: 10,791; Referee: Armando Villarreal

June 26 10	Portland Timbers	0–1	Minnesota United FC	Portland, Oregon
19:30 PST	Bravo (yellow card) 15'; D. Chará (yellow card) 70'	Report	Hunou 2'; Dotson (yellow card) 74'; Reynoso (yellow card) 85'	Stadium: Providence Park; Referee: Rosendo Mendoza

July 1 11	Austin FC	4–1	Portland Timbers	Austin, Texas
8:00 PM CT	Gallagher 28'; Fagúndez 33'; Kolmanič (yellow card) 44'; Pochettino (yellow card) 45+1'; Ring 77'; Jiménez 81'	Report	Tuiloma (yellow card) 45+5'; Ebobisse 45+7'; Asprilla (yellow card) 68'; Župarić (yellow card) 90+1'	Stadium: Q2 Stadium; Attendance: 20,738; Referee: Ted Unkel

July 17 12	Portland Timbers	1–0	FC Dallas	Portland, Oregon
19:30 PST	Bonilla (yellow card) 5'; Župarić (yellow card) 52'; Ebobisse 84'	Report	Quignon (yellow card) 57'; Pomykal (yellow card) 69'	Stadium: Providence Park; Attendance: 23,255; Referee: Joseph Dickerson

July 21 13	Portland Timbers	2–1	Los Angeles FC	Portland, Oregon
19:30 PST	Valeri 2'; Paredes (yellow card) 86'; Mora 90+3'	Report	Vela 17'	Stadium: Providence Park; Attendance: 23,500; Referee: Victor Rivas

July 24 14	Minnesota United FC	2–1	Portland Timbers	Saint Paul, Minnesota
17:00 PST	Gasper 74'; Lod 85', (yellow card) 90+4'	Report	Mora 10'	Stadium: Allianz Field; Attendance: 19,691; Referee: Marcos De Oliviera

July 30 15	LA Galaxy	4–1	Portland Timbers	Carson, California
19:00 PST	Raveloson 27'; Vázquez 34'; Kljestan 53' (pen.); Grandsir 56'; Villafaña (yellow card) 62'	Report	Ebobisse 29'; Van Rankin (yellow card) 74'; D. Chará (yellow card) 83'; Mabiala (yellow card) 90+6'	Stadium: Dignity Health Sports Park; Attendance: 15,644; Referee: Robert Sibiga

August 4 16	Portland Timbers	1–1	San Jose Earthquakes	Portland, Oregon
19:30 PST	Van Rankin (yellow card) 29'; Mora 45+6'; Williamson (yellow card) 85'; D. Chará (yellow card) 90+2' (yellow-red card) 90+3'; Blanco (yellow card) 90+6'; Mabiala (yellow card) 90+9'	Report	J. López 24'; Salinas (yellow card) 90+6'; Cardoso (yellow card) 90+8'; M. López (yellow card) 90+9'	Stadium: Providence Park; Attendance: 22,233; Referee: Allen Chapman

August 7 17	Portland Timbers	3–2	Real Salt Lake	Portland, Oregon
19:30 PST	Asprilla 10' (pen.); D. Chará 29'; Mora 62'; Valeri (yellow card) 89'	Report	Glad (yellow card) 6'; Menéndez (yellow card) 13'; Rusnák 40'; Luiz (yellow card) 45+1'; Herrera (yellow card) 48'; Kreilach 80'; Chang (yellow card) 87'	Stadium: Providence Park; Attendance: 23,577; Referee: Rosendo Mendoza

August 15 18	Portland Timbers	2–6	Seattle Sounders FC	Portland, Oregon
17:30 PST	Blanco 32'; Fochive 52'; Mabiala (yellow card) 54'; Zuparic (yellow card) 66'; Paredes (yellow card) 76'	Report	Montero 13', 29'; Ruidíaz 55', 72'; Paulo (yellow card) 69'; Medranda 77'; Benezet 90+4'	Stadium: Providence Park; Attendance: 25,218; Referee: Jair Marrufo

August 18 19	Sporting Kansas City	1–1	Portland Timbers	Kansas City, Kansas
17:30 PST	Sallói (yellow card) 25', (goal) 90+1'; Pulido (yellow card) 62'	Report	Mora 17'; D. Chará (yellow card) 28'; Van Rankin (yellow card) 43'; Bonilla (yellow card) 77'; Valeri (yellow card) 84'	Stadium: Children's Mercy Park; Attendance: 17,081; Referee: Ismail Elfath

August 21 20	Austin FC	3–1	Portland Timbers	Austin, Texas
18:00 PST	Domínguez 11' (pen.); Fagúndez 14'; Driussi 29'; Pochettino (yellow card) 83'	Report	Asprilla 55'; Župarić (yellow card) 64'	Stadium: Q2 Stadium; Attendance: 20,738; Referee: Guido Gonzales Jr.

August 29 21	Seattle Sounders FC	0–2	Portland Timbers	Seattle, Washington
19:30 PST		Report	Van Rankin (yellow card) 44'; Blanco 58'; Valeri (yellow card) 76'; Mora 90+5'	Stadium: Lumen Field; Attendance: 45,737; Referee: Alan Kelly

September 3 22	Houston Dynamo FC	0–2	Portland Timbers	Houston, Texas
17:00 PST	Parker (yellow card) 50'	Report	Y. Chará 15'; Mora 20' (pen.); Bravo (yellow card) 51'; Zambrano (yellow card) 86'; Mabiala (yellow card) 90+2'	Stadium: BBVA Stadium; Attendance: 9,872; Referee: Rubiel Vazquez

September 10 23	Vancouver Whitecaps FC	0–1	Portland Timbers	Vancouver, British Columbia
19:00 PST	Bikel (yellow card) 29'; Dájome (yellow card) 58'	Report	Veselinović 66' (o.g.); Mora (yellow card) 90+3'	Stadium: BC Place; Referee: Marcos de Oliveira

September 15 24	Portland Timbers	2–2	Colorado Rapids	Portland, Oregon
19:00 PST	Blanco (yellow card) 31', (goal) 90+1'; Tuiloma (yellow card) 33' (yellow-red card) 42'; Paredes (yellow card) 67'; Mora 67'; Clark (yellow card) 82'	Report	Trusty (yellow card) 31'; Lewis 64'; Kaye (yellow card) 66'; Barrios 86'; Abubakar (yellow card) 88'	Stadium: Providence Park; Attendance: 16,808; Referee: Armando Villarreal

September 19 25	Portland Timbers	2–1	Los Angeles FC	Portland, Oregon
15:00 PST	Asprilla 21'; Mabiala (yellow card) 24'; Blanco (yellow card) 26'; Bravo (yellow card) 42'; Fochive 68'; Valeri (yellow card) 83'	Report	Arango 27' (pen.)	Stadium: Providence Park; Attendance: 21,311; Referee: Chris Penso

September 25 26	Portland Timbers	6–1	Real Salt Lake	Portland, Oregon
19:30 PST	Mora 27'; Asprilla 36'; Y. Chara (yellow card) 45+4', (goal) 48'; D. Chara 68'; Niezgoda 85'; Paredes 88'	Report	Kreilach 41'; Ruíz (yellow card) 51'; Glad (yellow card) 73'	Stadium: Providence Park; Attendance: 21,579; Referee: Fotis Bazakos

September 29 27	Los Angeles FC	1–2	Portland Timbers	Los Angeles, California
19:00 PST	Palacios (yellow card) 29'; Musovski 55'; Arango (yellow card) 90+9'	Report	Paredes (yellow card) 25'; Y. Chará 45'; Asprilla (yellow card) 45+2', (goal) 59'; Valeri (yellow card) 76'	Stadium: Banc of California Stadium; Attendance: 22,056; Referee: Joseph Dickerson

October 3 28	Portland Timbers	1–0	Inter Miami CF	Portland, Oregon
2:30 PM PDT	D. Chara (yellow card) 67'; Niezgoda 83'	Report	Figal (yellow card) 6'	Stadium: Providence Park; Attendance: 22,006; Referee: Robert Sibiga

October 16 29	LA Galaxy	2–1	Portland Timbers	Carson, California
19:30 PST	Hernández (yellow card) 38', (goal) 62'; Kljestan (yellow card) 87', (goal) 90+2' (pen.); Joveljić (yellow card) 90+5'	Report	Bonilla (yellow card) 44'; D. Chará (yellow card) 65'; Blanco 72'	Stadium: Dignity Health Sports Park; Attendance: 15,322; Referee: Victor Rivas

October 20 30	Portland Timbers	2–3	Vancouver Whitecaps FC	Portland, Oregon
19:00 PST	Y. Chará 15'; Asprilla 42'; Paredes (yellow card) 90+2'	Report	Caicedo 63'; White 75', (yellow card) 90+2'; Dájome 82' (pen.)	Stadium: Providence Park; Attendance: 16,722; Referee: Guido Gonzales Jr.

October 23 31	Colorado Rapids	2–0	Portland Timbers	Commerce City, Colorado
18:00 PST	Badji 45+2'; Rubio 63'; Price (yellow card) 90+3'	Report	Asprilla (yellow card) 68'; Fochive (yellow card) 81'	Stadium: Dick's Sporting Goods Park; Attendance: 12,200; Referee: Ted Unkel

October 27 32	Portland Timbers	2–0	San Jose Earthquakes	Portland, Oregon
19:00 PST	Paredes (yellow card) 20'; D. Chará (yellow card) 27', (goal) 34'; Asprilla 55', (yellow card) 57'	Report	J. López (yellow card) 19'; Remedi (yellow card) 50'	Stadium: Providence Park; Attendance: 16,086; Referee: Alex Chilowicz

November 3 33	Real Salt Lake	1–3	Portland Timbers	Sandy, Utah
18:30 PST	Ruíz (yellow card) 36'; Rusnák 88' (pen.)	Report	Blanco 17', 45'; Herrera 38' (o.g.); Tuiloma (yellow card) 82'; Bravo (yellow card) 87'	Stadium: Rio Tinto Stadium; Attendance: 18,405; Referee: Chris Penso

November 7 34	Portland Timbers	3–0	Austin FC	Portland, Oregon
15:00 PST	Paredes 17'; Niezgoda 45'; Blanco 53'	Report	Berhalter (yellow card) 47'	Stadium: Providence Park; Attendance: 23,127; Referee: Rosendo Mendoza

==== MLS Cup Playoffs ====
November 21 First Round	Portland Timbers	3–1	Minnesota United FC	Portland, Oregon
14:30 PST	Blanco (yellow card) 19'; Blanco 46', 66'; Mabiala 43', (yellow card) 86'	Report	Fragapane 11', (yellow card) 85'; Trapp (yellow card) 32'; Gasper (yellow card) 40'; Boxall (yellow card) 73'; Dibassy (yellow card) 90+7'	Stadium: Providence Park; Attendance: 22,533; Referee: Armando Villarreal

November 25 Conf. Semifinals	Colorado Rapids	0–1	Portland Timbers	Commerce City, Colorado
13:30 PST		Report	Župarić (yellow card) 45'; Župarić 90'; Asprilla (red card) 90+4'; Mora (yellow card) 90+8'	Stadium: Dick's Sporting Goods Park; Referee: Ted Unkel

December 4 Conf. Finals	Portland Timbers	2–0	Real Salt Lake	Portland, Oregon
3:30 PM PST	Mora 5'; Moreno 61', (yellow card) 61'	Report	Herrera (yellow card) 58' (yellow-red card) 79'; Ruíz (yellow card) 90+3'	Stadium: Providence Park; Attendance: 25,218; Referee: Alan Kelly

===== MLS Cup =====
December 11, 2021
12:00 p.m. PST

Portland Timbers	1–1 (a.e.t.)	New York City FC
Mora 90+4'	Report	Castellanos 41'
Penalties
Mora (penalty missed); Valeri (penalty missed); Moreno (penalty scored); Paredes (penalty scored)	2–4	(penalty scored) Castellanos; (penalty missed) Morales; (penalty scored) Moralez; (penalty scored) Talles Magno; (penalty scored) Callens

Providence Park, Portland, Oregon
Attendance: 25,218
Referee: Armando Villarreal

=== CONCACAF Champions League ===
==== Round of 16 ====
April 6 First leg	Marathón (Honduras)	2–2	(United States) Portland Timbers	San Pedro Sula, Honduras
3:00 PM PDT	Castillo 39'; Ramírez 68'	Report	Mora 35'; Torres 59' (o.g.); Williamson (yellow card) 77'	Stadium: Estadio Olímpico Metropolitano; Attendance: 0 Referee: César Ramos (Mexico)

April 13 Second leg	Portland Timbers (United States)	5–0 (7–2 agg.)	(Honduras) Marathón	Portland
5:00 PM PDT	Župarić (yellow card) 8'; Y. Chará 19', 36', 79'; Valeri 66'; Bodily (yellow card) 87'; Loría 89'	Report	López (yellow card) 43'	Stadium: Providence Park; Attendance: 5,000; Referee: Iván Barton (El Salvador)

==== Quarter-finals ====
April 28 First leg	Portland Timbers (United States)	1–1	(Mexico) América	Portland
7:30 PM PDT	Mora (yellow card) 19', (goal) 90+7' (pen.); Župarić (yellow card) 40'; Bravo (yellow card) 52'; D. Chará (yellow card) 87'	Report	Suárez (yellow card) 33'; Martínez 45+1' (pen.), (yellow card) 82'; Aquino (yellow card) 61'; Fuentes (yellow card) 70'; Sánchez (yellow card) 71'	Stadium: Providence Park; Referee: Mario Escobar (Guatemala)

May 5 Second leg	América (Mexico)	3–1 (4–2 agg.)	(United States) Portland Timbers	Mexico City, Mexico
7:15 PM PDT	Viñas 21', 59' (pen.); Suárez 70'	Report	Valeri (yellow card) 56', (goal) 64' (pen.); Tuiloma (yellow card) 60'; Mabiala (yellow card) 75'; Van Rankin (yellow card) 79'	Stadium: Estadio Azteca; Referee: Iván Barton (El Salvador)

== Statistics ==
=== Appearances and discipline ===
Numbers in parentheses denote appearances as a substitute.

(T2) = Players called up from Portland Timbers 2 for short-term contracts.

No.	Pos.	Name	MLS				MLS Playoffs				Champions League				Total			
No.	Pos.	Name	Apps	Booked	(yellow card) (yellow-red card)	Sent off (straight red)	Apps	Booked	(yellow card) (yellow-red card)	Sent off (straight red)	Apps	Booked	(yellow card) (yellow-red card)	Sent off (straight red)	Apps	Booked	(yellow card) (yellow-red card)	Sent off (straight red)

=== Goalkeeper stats ===
The list is sorted by total minutes played then by jersey number.

No.	Player	MLS				MLS Playoffs				Champions League				Total			
No.	Player	MIN	GA	GAA	SV	MIN	GA	GAA	SV	MIN	GA	GAA	SV	MIN	GA	GAA	SV

=== Top assists ===
The list is sorted by shirt number when total assists are equal.

Rnk	Pos	No.	Player	MLS	MLS Cup Playoffs	Champions League	Total

=== Shutouts ===
The list is sorted by shirt number when total clean sheets are equal.

Rnk	No.	Player	MLS	MLS Cup Playoffs	Champions League	Total

=== Summary ===
Games played	2 (2 Champions League)
Games won	1 (1 Champions League)
Games drawn	1 (1 Champions League)
Games lost	0
Goals scored	7 (7 Champions League)
Goals conceded	2 (2 Champions League)
Goal difference	+5 (+5 Champions League)
Clean sheets	1 (1 Champions League)
Yellow cards	3 (3 Champions League)
Red cards	0
Most appearances	Tied (2 appearances)
Top scorer	(Colombia) Yimmi Chará (3 goals)
Top assists	(Mexico) Josecarlos Van Rankin (2 assists)
Top shutouts	(United States) Steve Clark (1 shutout)
Winning percentage	Overall: 1/2 (50%)

Last updated: April 13, 2021.
Source: Competitions

=== Top scorers ===
The list is sorted by shirt number when total goals are equal.

Rnk	Pos	No.	Player	MLS	MLS Cup Playoffs	Champions League	Total
