= Bill Tuiloma =

New Zealand footballer (born 1995)

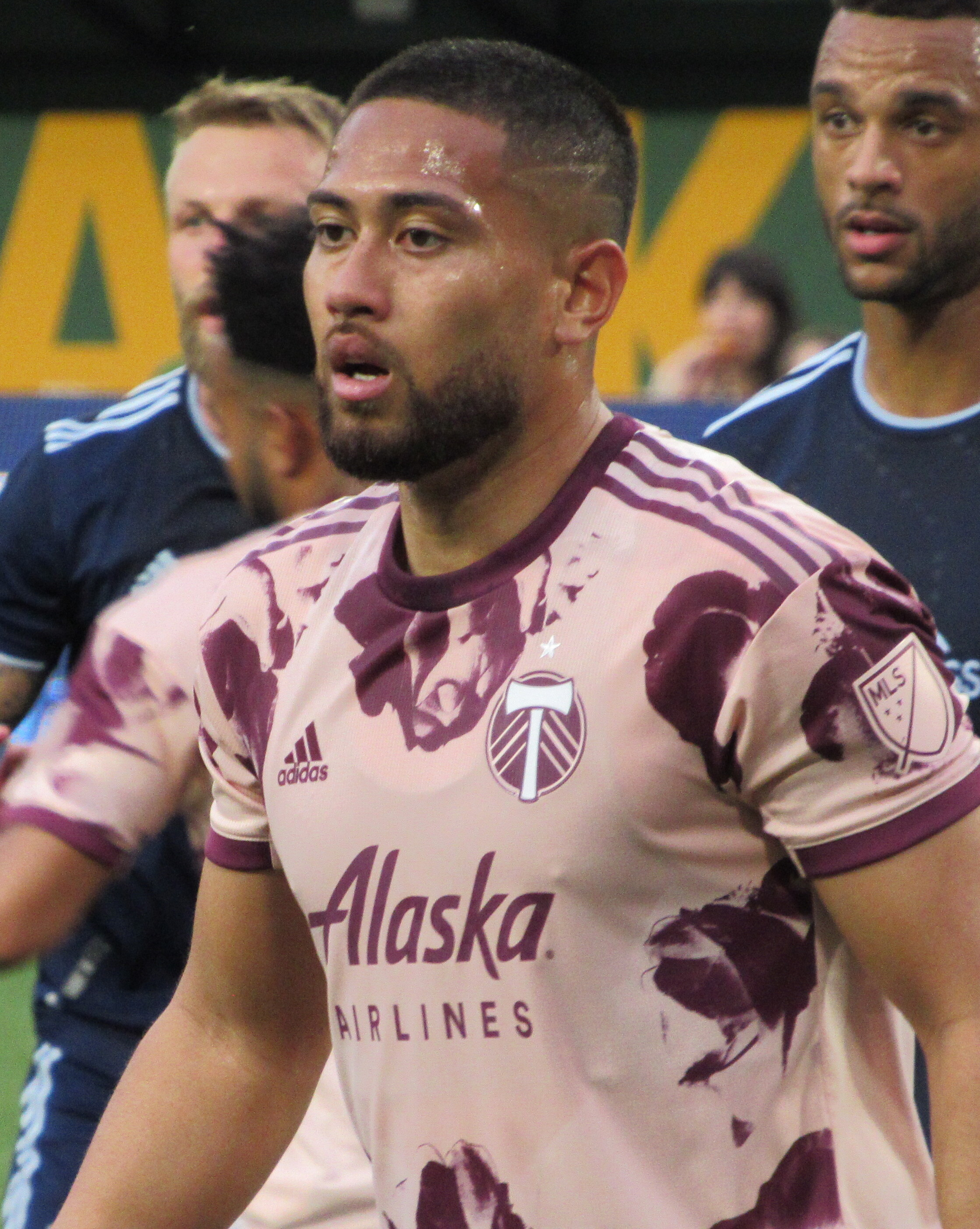
- Tuiloma with the Portland Timbers in 2022

Personal information
- Full name: Bill Poni Tuiloma
- Date of birth: 27 March 1995 (age 31)
- Place of birth: Beach Haven, New Zealand
- Height: 1.78 m (5 ft 10 in)
- Positions: Centre-back; defensive midfielder

Team information
- Current team: Wellington Phoenix
- Number: 28

Youth career
- 2011: Birkenhead United
- 2011: Asia–Pacific FA

Senior career*
| Years | Team | Apps | (Gls) |
| 2011–2012 | Waitakere United | 1 | (0) |
| 2013–2017 | Marseille B | 35 | (3) |
| 2015–2017 | Marseille | 2 | (0) |
| 2015–2016 | → Strasbourg (loan) | 9 | (0) |
| 2015–2016 | → Strasbourg B (loan) | 7 | (1) |
| 2017–2022 | Portland Timbers | 108 | (10) |
| 2017–2020 | Portland Timbers 2 | 21 | (4) |
| 2023–2025 | Charlotte FC | 29 | (1) |
| 2023 | Crown Legacy | 7 | (2) |
| 2026– | Wellington Phoenix | 17 | (1) |

International career^{‡}
| 2011 | New Zealand U17 | 6 | (1) |
| 2013–2015 | New Zealand U20 | 9 | (1) |
| 2015 | New Zealand U23 | 3 | (1) |
| 2013– | New Zealand | 45 | (4) |
- * Club domestic league appearances and goals as of 5 November 2026 ‡ National team caps and goals as of 16 November 2025

Bill Poni Tuiloma (born 27 March 1995) is a New Zealand professional footballer who plays as a centre-back or defensive midfielder for A-League Men club Wellington Phoenix and the New Zealand national team.

Tuiloma has represented New Zealand internationally since 2013, and was the first New Zealander to play in Ligue 1, the highest division of French football.

== Early life ==
Born in Beach Haven, New Zealand, Tuiloma is of Samoan descent. He attended Birkdale Intermediate, Birkenhead College and Lincoln High School. He was part of the first intake of players to be invited to the Asia Pacific Football Academy which worked with Chelsea FC.

== Club career ==
=== Marseille ===
Following trials with LA Galaxy and Queens Park Rangers, Tuiloma signed a deal with French side Olympique de Marseille in July 2013.

"I went to QPR and trialed there for a week and somehow, I think they have a connection with Marseille, because Joey Barton was with Marseille for a little while, so I think that’s where they have the connection… So I went there for a week, trialed, played a game as well, came back and got some good feedback from them, and then a few months later they wanted to sign me. I was over the moon, I was speechless, it was really good news for me."

— Bill Tuiloma on his journey from relative football obscurity to his eventual move to Marseille in a 2013 interview.

Tuiloma admitted that Queens Park Rangers and Wellington Phoenix were also interested in signing him but preferred to sign for OM.

Tuiloma made his first-team debut for the club on 7 February 2015, when he came on as a late substitute for Florian Thauvin in a 2–2 draw with Rennes. Upon making his debut he became the first New Zealander ever to play in Ligue 1. It was one of only two senior appearances he made, however, before signing on loan for Strasbourg for the 2015–16 season, and then permanently for Portland Timbers in 2017.

=== Portland Timbers ===
On 25 July 2017, Tuiloma officially signed with MLS side Portland Timbers. He made three appearances with Portland Timbers 2 in 2017, and made his first-team debut on 24 March 2018, in a 1–1 draw with FC Dallas. The Timbers resigned Tuiloma on 24 January 2018.

=== Charlotte FC ===
On 16 February 2023, Tuiloma was acquired by Charlotte FC from the Portland Timbers in exchange for US$800,000 in General Allocation Money. During the 2023 season, he made 19 MLS appearances (15 starts) and also featured in the Leagues Cup.

On 21 November 2025, it was announced that Tuiloma's optional contract extension had been declined by the club.

=== Wellington Phoenix ===
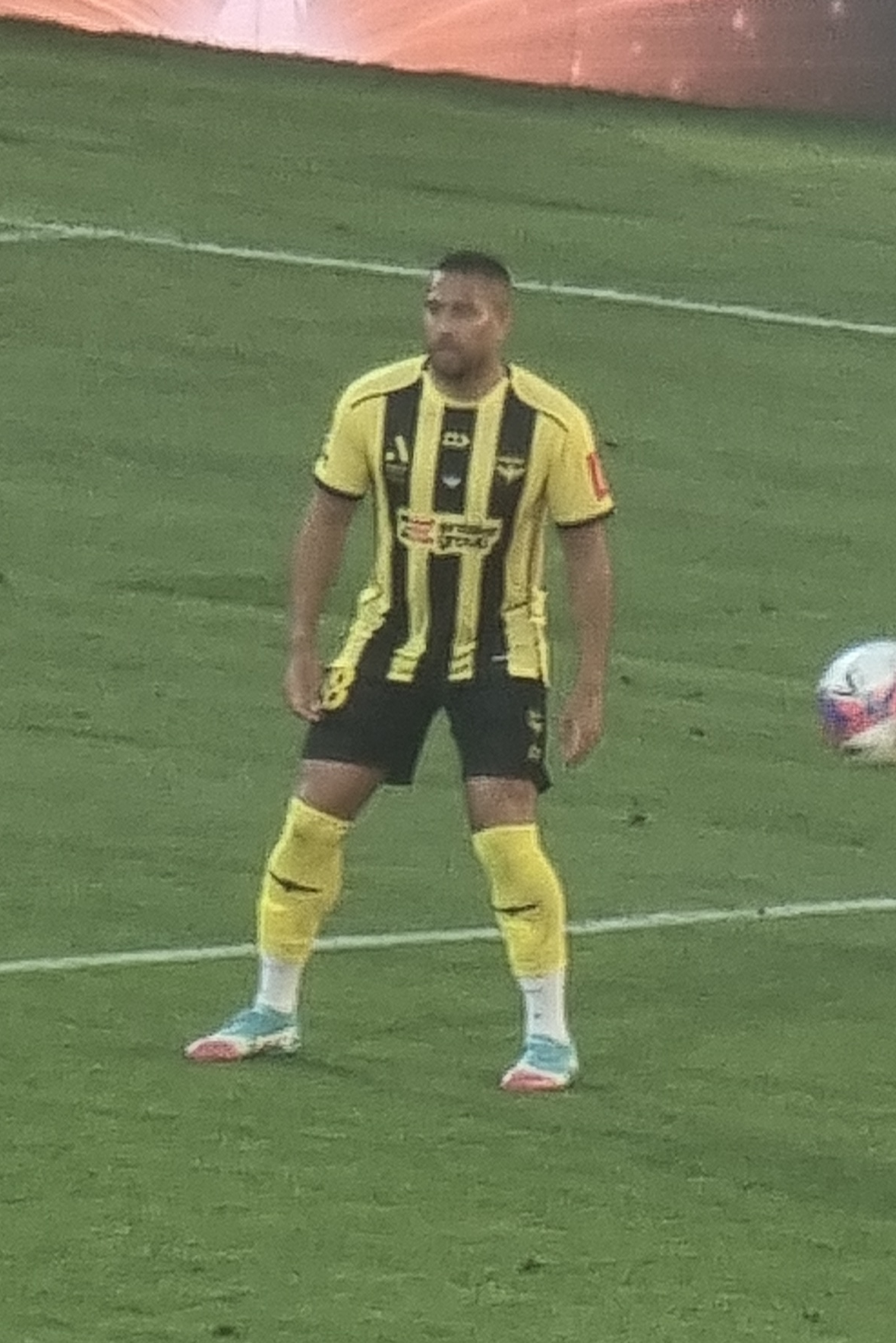
Tuiloma playing for the Wellington Phoenix in 2026.

On 8 January 2026, Tuiloma returned to play in New Zealand for the first time in over 12 years, being announced as Wellington Phoenix's newest signing, agreeing to a contract running until 2028.

== International career ==
Tuiloma represented New Zealand under-17 at the 2011 FIFA U-17 World Cup and New Zealand under-20, for whom he was also the captain, at the 2013 and 2015 FIFA U-20 World Cups.

He made his senior international debut for New Zealand on 15 October 2013, at the age of 18, when he came on as a substitute in a 0–0 draw with Trinidad and Tobago in Port of Spain.

== Career statistics ==
=== Club ===
As of match played 6 October 2024

| Club | Season | League | | | National cup (Note: Includes U.S. Open Cup) | | Continental | | Other | | Total | |
| Club | Season | Division | Apps | Goals | Apps | Goals | Apps | Goals | Apps | Goals | Apps | Goals |
|---|---|---|---|---|---|---|---|---|---|---|---|---|
| Waitakere United | 2011–12 | Premiership | 1 | 0 | 0 | 0 | — | | — | | 1 | 0 |
| Marseille | 2013–14 | Ligue 1 | 0 | 0 | 0 | 0 | 0 | 0 | 0 | 0 | 0 | 0 |
| Marseille | 2014–15 | Ligue 1 | 2 | 0 | 0 | 0 | 0 | 0 | — | | 2 | 0 |
| Marseille | 2016–17 | Ligue 1 | 0 | 0 | 0 | 0 | 0 | 0 | — | | 0 | 0 |
| Marseille | Total | | 2 | 0 | 0 | 0 | 0 | 0 | 0 | 0 | 2 | 0 |
| Strasbourg (loan) | 2015–16 | Championnat National | 9 | 0 | 0 | 0 | — | | — | | 9 | 0 |
| Portland Timbers | 2017 | Major League Soccer | 0 | 0 | 0 | 0 | — | | — | | 0 | 0 |
| Portland Timbers | 2018 | Major League Soccer | 13 | 1 | 4 | 0 | — | | — | | 17 | 1 |
| Portland Timbers | 2019 | Major League Soccer | 25 | 1 | 1 | 0 | — | | 1 (Note: Appearance in MLS Cup Playoffs) | 0 | 27 | 1 |
| Portland Timbers | 2020 | Major League Soccer | 14 | 1 | — | | — | | — | | 14 | 1 |
| Portland Timbers | 2021 | Major League Soccer | 26 | 1 | — | | 2 (Note: Appearances in CONCACAF Champions League) | 0 | 1 | 0 | 29 | 1 |
| Portland Timbers | 2022 | Major League Soccer | 30 | 6 | 1 | 0 | — | | — | | 31 | 6 |
| Portland Timbers | Total | | 108 | 10 | 6 | 0 | 2 | 0 | 2 | 0 | 118 | 10 |
| Charlotte FC | 2023 | Major League Soccer | 17 | 0 | 2 | 0 | — | | — | | 19 | 0 |
| Charlotte FC | 2024 | Major League Soccer | 4 | 0 | — | | — | | 1 (Note: Appearance in Leagues Cup) | 0 | 5 | 0 |
| Charlotte FC | 2025 | Major League Soccer | 8 | 1 | 2 | 1 | — | | 3 (Note: Appearance in Leagues Cup) | 1 | 13 | 3 |
| Charlotte FC | Total | | 29 | 1 | 4 | 1 | — | | 4 | 1 | 37 | 3 |
| Wellington Phoenix | 2025–26 | A-League Men | 4 | 0 | — | | — | | 4 | 0 | | |
| Career total | | | 153 | 11 | 10 | 1 | 2 | 0 | 6 | 1 | 171 | 13 |

=== International ===
As of match played 30 March 2022.

| National team | Year | Apps | Goals |
|---|---|---|---|
| New Zealand | 2013 | 2 | 0 |
| New Zealand | 2014 | 5 | 0 |
| New Zealand | 2015 | 2 | 0 |
| New Zealand | 2016 | 6 | 0 |
| New Zealand | 2017 | 9 | 0 |
| New Zealand | 2018 | 0 | 0 |
| New Zealand | 2019 | 2 | 0 |
| New Zealand | 2020 | 0 | 0 |
| New Zealand | 2021 | 1 | 1 |
| New Zealand | 2022 | 4 | 3 |
| Total | | 31 | 4 |

International goals

List of international goals scored by Bill Tuiloma
| No. | Date | Venue | Opponent | Score | Result | Competition |
|---|---|---|---|---|---|---|
| 1. | 9 October 2021 | Bahrain National Stadium, Riffa, Bahrain | Curaçao | 1–0 | 2–1 | Friendly |
| 2. | 24 March 2022 | Suheim bin Hamad Stadium, Doha, Qatar | New Caledonia | 5–1 | 7–1 | 2022 FIFA World Cup qualification |
| 3. | 30 March 2022 | Grand Hamad Stadium, Doha, Qatar | Solomon Islands | 1–0 | 5–0 | 2022 FIFA World Cup qualification |
| 4. | 30 March 2022 | Grand Hamad Stadium, Doha, Qatar | Solomon Islands | 4–0 | 5–0 | 2022 FIFA World Cup qualification |

== Honours ==
Waitakere United

- New Zealand Football Championship: 2011–12

Strasbourg

- Championnat National: 2015–16

Portland Timbers

- MLS is Back Tournament: 2020

New Zealand

- OFC Nations Cup: 2016
- OFC U-20 Championship: 2013
- OFC U-17 Championship: 2011
