= Victor Arboleda =

Colombian footballer (born 1997)

Personal information
- Full name: Victor Manuel Arboleda Murillo
- Date of birth: 1 January 1997 (age 29)
- Place of birth: El Cerrito, Colombia
- Height: 1.74 m (5 ft 8 1/2 in)
- Positions: Forward; winger

Youth career
- Escuela Carlos Sarmiento Lora
- 2014–2015: Deportivo Cali

Senior career*
Years	Team	Apps	(Gls)
2015	Deportivo Cali	6	(1)
2016	Portland Timbers 2	25	(3)
2017–2018	Portland Timbers	6	(0)
2017	→ Portland Timbers 2 (loan)	28	(11)
2019	Alianza Petrolera	3	(0)
2020–2021	Unión Magdalena	15	(4)
2021–2022	Alianza	20	(4)
2022–2023	Deportivo Pasto	32	(3)
2023	Al-Muharraq	?	(?)
2023–2024	Al-Safa	10	(1)
2024	Yanbian Longding	11	(0)

International career
- Colombia U17
- * Club domestic league appearances and goals as of 26 October 2024

Victor Manuel Arboleda Murillo (born 1 January 1997) is a Colombian footballer who recently played for China League One club Yanbian Longding.

== Career ==
Arboleda joined United Soccer League side Portland Timbers 2 on 24 March 2016. He was selected in the USL's 20 under 20, highlighting the league's 20 best players under 20 years old. He made the move to the Timber's senior team on January 12, 2017. Arboleda was released by Portland on 10 December 2018.

In July 2019, Arboleda joined Alianza Petrolera. In January 2020, Arboleda joined Unión Magdalena.

On 15 September 2023, Arboleda joined Saudi club Al-Safa.

On 27 January 2024, China League One club Yanbian Longding announced the signing of Arboleda.

== Career statistics ==
As of match played 26 October 2024

Appearances and goals by club, season and competition
Club	Season	League			National Cup		Continental		Other		Total	
Club	Season	Division	Apps	Goals	Apps	Goals	Apps	Goals	Apps	Goals	Apps	Goals
Deportivo Cali	2015	Categoría Primera A	6	1	2	1	—		—		8	2
Portland Timbers 2	2016	United Soccer League	25	3	—		—		—		25	3
Portland Timbers 2	2017	United Soccer League	13	4	—		—		—		13	4
Portland Timbers 2	2018	United Soccer League	13	7	—		—		0	0	13	7
Portland Timbers 2	Total		51	14	—		—		0	0	51	14
Portland Timbers	2017	Major League Soccer	5	0	1	0	1	0	0	0	7	0
Portland Timbers	2018	Major League Soccer	1	0	0	0	—		0	0	1	0
Portland Timbers	Total		6	0	1	0	1	0	0	0	8	0
Alianza Petrolera	2019	Categoría Primera A	3	0	—		—		—		3	0
Unión Magdalena	2020	Categoría Primera B	15	4	1	0	—		—		16	4
Alianza	2021–22	Primera División de El Salvador	20	4	—		2	0	—		22	4
Deportivo Pasto	2022	Categoría Primera A	32	3	2	0	—		—		34	3
Al-Muharraq	2022–23	Bahraini Premier League	?	?	—		—		—		?	?
Al-Safa	2023–24	Saudi First Division	10	1	—		—		—		10	1
Yanbian Longding	2024	China League One	11	0	0	0	—		—		11	0
Career total			153	27	6	1	3	0	0	0	162	28
