= Jeremy Ebobisse =

American soccer player (born 1997)

Personal information
- Full name: Jeremy Edward Nirina Ebobisse Ebolo
- Date of birth: February 14, 1997 (age 29)
- Place of birth: Paris, France
- Height: 6 ft 0 in (1.84 m)
- Position: Striker

Team information
- Current team: Los Angeles FC
- Number: 17

Youth career
- Bethesda SC

College career
Years	Team	Apps	(Gls)
2014–2015	Duke Blue Devils	37	(9)

Senior career*
Years	Team	Apps	(Gls)
2015	D.C. United U-23	9	(6)
2016	Charleston Battery	5	(1)
2017–2021	Portland Timbers	88	(26)
2017–2018	→ Portland Timbers 2 (loan)	23	(5)
2021–2024	San Jose Earthquakes	110	(34)
2025–	Los Angeles FC	18	(3)
2025–	Los Angeles FC 2	0	(0)

International career^{‡}
2016–2017	United States U20	17	(11)
2019–2021	United States U23	2	(0)
2019	United States	1	(0)
Medal record
Representing United States
Winner	CONCACAF U-20 Championship	2017
- * Club domestic league appearances and goals as of September 23, 2025 ‡ National team caps and goals as of January 27, 2019

Jeremy Edward Nirina Ebobisse Ebolo (born February 14, 1997) is a professional soccer player who plays as a striker for Major League Soccer club Los Angeles FC. Born in France, he has played for the United States national team.

== Youth and amateur ==
Born in Paris, France, Jeremy Ebobisse moved with his family to Bethesda, Maryland, at age two. He attended Walter Johnson High School, where he played alongside Gedion Zelalem and they were coached by Michael Williams. In his freshman year, Walter Johnson had an undefeated regular season and reached the state championship game where they were upset by Bowie High School. Ebobisse and Zelalem starred for this impressive squad with both receiving individual honors at the conclusion of the season.

Outside of high school, he played club soccer the OBGC Rangers which also would go on to produce several other professional players including Zelalem, Carter Manley, Chase Gasper, and Jake Rozhansky. Ebobisse played two years of college soccer at Duke University in 2014 and 2015, where he scored 9 goals in 37 appearances. While at college, Ebobisse appeared with Premier Development League side D.C. United U-23 in 2015.

== Club career ==
Ebobisse signed a contract with Major League Soccer in August 2016, but without a club until the 2017 MLS SuperDraft in January 2017. He spent time with United Soccer League side Charleston Battery towards the end of their 2016 season. Jeremy was drafted fourth overall in the 2017 MLS SuperDraft by the Portland Timbers, following a deal with the Houston Dynamo for an international slot, $100,000 in general allocation money, and the tenth draft pick.

Ebobisse enjoyed a breakout in the second half of the 2018 MLS season, starting all six of the Timbers' playoff appearances, including the MLS Cup 2018 final against Atlanta United FC.

In August 2021, he was traded by Portland to San Jose. During week two of the 2023 season, Ebobisse was named to the league's Team of the Matchday after tallying a goal and an assist in San Jose's 2–1 victory over the Vancouver Whitecaps.

In December 2024, Los Angeles FC signed Ebobisse to a three-year contract with a club option for 2028.

== International career ==
Ebobisse was born in France and is of Cameroonian and Malagasy descent. He moved to the United States at a young age, and chose to represent the U.S. internationally. Ebobisse played with the United States under-20 national team during the 2017 FIFA U-20 World Cup.

Ebobisse earned his first call up for the United States senior team as a part of the 2019 January camp. He made his debut for the United States national team on January 27, 2019, in a friendly against Panama, as a starter. On October 31, 2019, Ebobisse was called into the U.S. Mens national team pre-camp in, Bradenton, Florida.

== Personal life ==
Ebobisse's older brother, Patrick, played college soccer at Williams College in Massachusetts.

== Career statistics ==
=== Club ===
As of match played November 2, 2025

Appearances and goals by club, season and competition
Club	Season	League			U.S. Open Cup		Continental		Other		Total	
Club	Season	Division	Apps	Goals	Apps	Goals	Apps	Goals	Apps	Goals	Apps	Goals
Charleston Battery	2016	USL	5	1	–		–		–		5	1
Portland Timbers	2017	MLS	14	1	1	0	–		2 (Note: Appearances in MLS Cup playoffs)	0	17	1
Portland Timbers	2018	MLS	9	2	1	0	–		6	1	16	3
Portland Timbers	2019	MLS	34	11	4	1	–		1	0	39	12
Portland Timbers	2020	MLS	18	8	–		–		5 (Note: Four appearances and one goal in MLS is Back Tournament knockout stage, one appearance in MLS Cup playoffs)	1	23	9
Portland Timbers	2021	MLS	13	4	–		1 (Note: Appearances in CONCACAF Champions Cup)	0	–		14	4
Portland Timbers	Total		88	26	6	1	1	0	14	2	109	29
Portland Timbers 2 (loan)	2017	USL	5	1	–		–		–		5	1
Portland Timbers 2 (loan)	2018	USL	18	4	–		–		–		18	4
Portland Timbers 2 (loan)	Total		28	6	–		–		–		28	6
San Jose Earthquakes	2021	MLS	11	1	–		–		–		11	1
San Jose Earthquakes	2022	MLS	34	17	2	0	–		–		36	17
San Jose Earthquakes	2023	MLS	34	10	1	0	–		3 (Note: Two appearances in Leagues Cup, one appearance in MLS Cup playoffs)	0	38	10
San Jose Earthquakes	2024	MLS	31	6	–		–		4 (Note: Appearances in Leagues Cup)	4	35	10
San Jose Earthquakes	Total		110	34	3	0	–		7	4	120	38
LAFC	2025	MLS	22	4	–		4	0	8 (Note: Three appearances in FIFA Club World Cup, three appearances in Leagues Cup, two appearances and one goal in MLS Cup playoffs)	1	33	5
Career total			248	70	9	1	5	0	29	7	291	79

=== International ===
As of match played January 27, 2019

Appearances and goals by national team and year
National team	Year	Apps	Goals
United States	2019	1	0
Total		1	0

== Honors ==
Portland Timbers

- MLS is Back Tournament: 2020

United States U20

- CONCACAF Under-20 Championship: 2017
