= Guillermo Valencia (footballer) =

Colombian footballer and coach

Guillermo "Memo" Valencia is a Colombian football coach and former player who currently serves as the goalkeeping coach for the Portland Timbers in Major League Soccer.

== Playing career ==
=== Club ===
Valencia spent 11 years playing soccer professionally in the Colombian Categoría Primera A as a goalkeeper for América de Cali (1990-1995) and Deportivo Pereira (1995-2001). In 2000, he was part of the Deportivo Pereira team that won the Categoría Primera B.

Valencia continued his career in Mexico with Club Deportivo Marte before moving to the United States where he played with the Westchester Flames (2003-2004) and the Long Island Rough Riders (2005).

=== International ===
As a youth he was a member of the Colombia U-20 national team.

== Coaching career ==
Since retiring as a player, Valencia has worked as a goalkeeper coach for clubs and organizations at all different levels of the sport. Colleges he has coached at include Columbia University, New York University, Seton Hall University, Iona College, and Manhattanville College.

Valencia joined the New York Cosmos Academy in 2007, working with the club's goalkeepers. In 2013, Valencia joined the coaching staff of the New York Cosmos first team as goalkeeper coach, ahead of the team's relaunch season.

During his first season with the team, the Cosmos captured the 2013 NASL Soccer Bowl title and Valencia helped guide starting goalkeeper Kyle Reynish to the 2013 NASL Golden Glove Award, given to the goalkeeper with the lowest Goals Against Average (GAA) during the regular season. Reynish posted a league-leading 0.92 GAA and an 8-4-1 (W-D-L) record during the 2013 season. During the 2014 Spring season, Valencia coached goalkeeper Jimmy Maurer to a record of 6-1-2 and a league-leading GAA of 0.33. Maurer recorded a league-high 11 shutouts in 24 appearances for the Cosmos in the 2014 regular season. His 0.91 goals against average (GAA) was second highest in the league, he finished tied for second in the league in saves (67) and he was named to the NASL Best XI as the best goalkeeper in the 2014 season.

Valencia also serves as goalkeeper coach for the U-18 U.S. national team and as assistant goalkeeper coach for the U-20 U.S. national team.
