= EMLS Cup =

Esports tournament

eMLS Cup
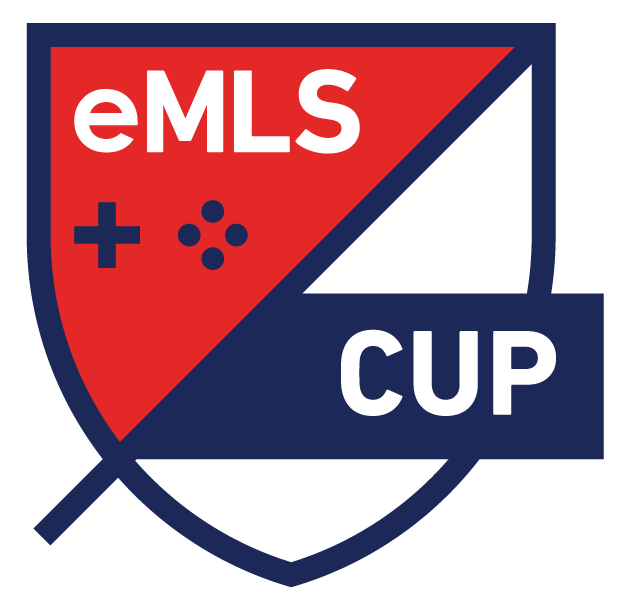
- Sport: EA Sports FC esports
- Founded: February 21, 2018; 8 years ago New York City, New York, U.S.
- First season: 2018
- No. of teams: 28
- Country: United States (25 teams); Canada (3 teams)
- Continent: North America
- Most recent champion: New England Revolution (1st title)
- Most titles: 7 teams (1 title)
- Broadcaster: Twitch
- Sponsors: Alienware; Electronic Arts; Major League Soccer; PlayStation 4
- Related competitions: FC Pro World Championship formerly FIFA eWorld Cup
- Website: eMLS

The eMLS Cup is an esports tournament held by Major League Soccer in conjunction with the EA Sports on EA Sports FC (formerly FIFA franchise). The tournament serves as an official league qualifier for the FC Pro World Championship (formerly FIFA eWorld Cup).

== History ==
=== 2018 eMLS Cup ===
The 2018 eMLS Cup ran from April 5–8 at the PAX East gaming festival at the Boston Convention and Exhibition Center in Boston, Massachusetts. The tournament was contested by representatives of 19 MLS clubs divided into their respective Eastern and Western Conferences. Competitors were required to have three MLS players on the field at all times, including two players from the club that they represented. An initial preliminary regular season saw players play each other twice in a round robin format before the top eight teams from each conference progressed to a knockout phase. Both eMLS Cup finalists won berths in the Global Series Playoffs, the qualifying tournament for the 2018 FIFA eWorld Cup, with the winner also receiving $10,000 prize money.

=== 2019 eMLS Cup ===
The 2019 eMLS Cup Finals were held on March 30 at the PAX East gaming festival at The Castle at Park Plaza in Boston, Massachusetts. The tournament was contested by representatives of 22 MLS clubs divided into their respective Eastern and Western Conferences. Competitors were required to have three MLS players on the field at all times. The format consisted of two prior series earlier in the year with the final standings combining the regular season conference records from Series 1 and 2 with one final regular season played at the 2019 eMLS Cup finals itself against players from the opposite conference. The top five players in each conference based on their aggregated record from Series 1 and Series 2, the resultant bonus points, and the eMLS Cup regular season, qualified for the knockout phase of the tournament with the top two gaining first-round byes. The remaining players competed in a last chance qualifying bracket for the final place in each conference's knockout phase. The overall winner received $15,000 prize money.

== Past winners ==
Year	1st place	2nd place	3rd place	4th place
2018	Kid M3Mito (Houston Dynamo)	LyesMTL (Montreal Impact)	Didychrislito (New York City FC)	AlanAvi (FC Dallas)
2019	Doolsta (Philadelphia Union)	GGGodfather (LA Galaxy)	Didychrislito (New York City FC) / AlanAvi (FC Dallas)	
2020	G_Adamou (New York Red Bulls)	Didychrislito (New York City FC)	RemiMartinn (Los Angeles FC) / Paulo Neto (Atlanta United FC)	
2021	Didychrislito (New York City FC)	G_Adamou (New York Red Bulls)	xbLeU (Austin FC) / GGGodfather (LA Galaxy)	
2022	Paulo Neto (Atlanta United FC)	KingCJ0 (D.C. United)	GoalMachine (Toronto FC)	Lamps (Minnesota United FC)
2023	NR7 (St. Louis City SC)	Paulo Neto (Atlanta United FC)	Lamps (Minnesota United FC)	Loux11 (CF Montreal)
2024	Jafonso (New England Revolution)	K1John (Inter Miami CF)	Ollelito (New York City FC)	NR7 (St. Louis City SC)
