= Cristhian Paredes =

Paraguayan footballer (born 1998)

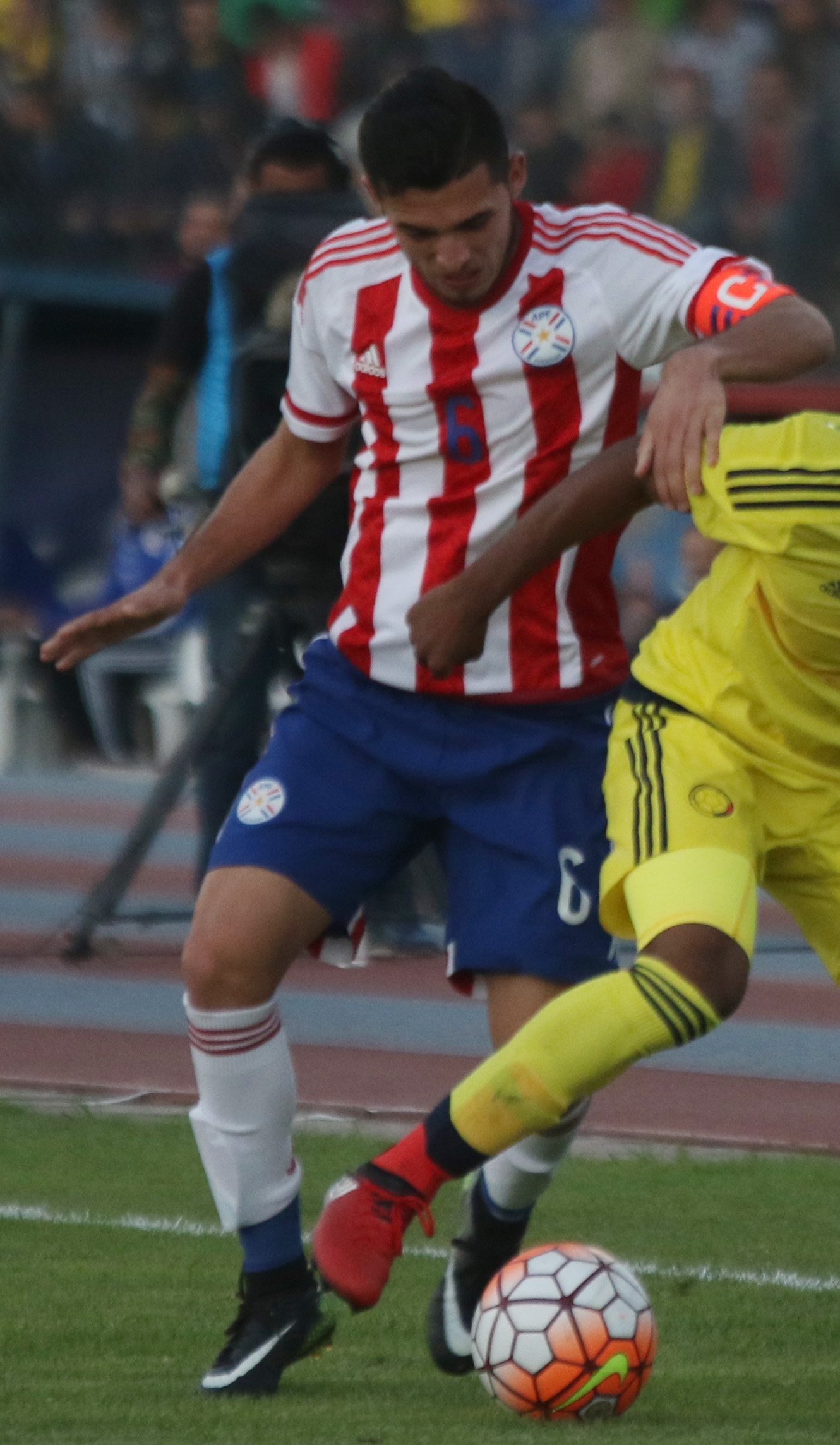
- Paredes with Paraguay in 2017

Personal information
- Full name: Cristhian Fabián Paredes Maciel
- Date of birth: 18 May 1998 (age 28)
- Place of birth: Yaguarón, Paraguay
- Height: 1.82 m (6 ft 0 in)
- Position: Midfielder

Team information
- Current team: Cerro Porteño
- Number: 17

Youth career
- Sol de América

Senior career*
| Years | Team | Apps | (Gls) |
| 2016 | Sol de América | 30 | (4) |
| 2017–2020 | América | 0 | (0) |
| 2018–2019 | → Portland Timbers (loan) | 41 | (5) |
| 2020–2025 | Portland Timbers | 150 | (9) |

International career^{‡}
| 2015 | Paraguay U17 | 9 | (2) |
| 2015– | Paraguay U23 | 1 | (0) |
| 2017– | Paraguay U20 | 4 | (1) |
| 2017– | Paraguay | 6 | (0) |
- * Club domestic league appearances and goals as of 21:17, 28 September 2025 (UTC) ‡ National team caps and goals as of 20 November 2018

Cristhian Fabián Paredes Maciel (born 18 May 1998) is a Paraguayan professional footballer who plays for Cerro Porteño.

== Career ==
=== Sol de América ===
He was formed in the Club Sol de América academy. While he was in the Sub-17 category, Paredes was promoted to the First Division team by coach Daniel Garnero. He made his debut in the top category of Paraguayan soccer on 23 January 2016 with a 2–1 victory over Club Olimpia, in the first week of the 2016 Paraguayan Primera División season.

He kept being a constant starter of the first team of Club Sol de América. He scored his first goal in Paraguayan Primera División on 8 May 2016, against General Caballero Sport Club, a match valid for the 20th week of 2016 Paraguayan Primera División season.

He debuted internationally in an official match on 10 August 2016 in the 2016 Copa Sudamericana against C.D. Jorge Wilstermann of Bolivia, in the Luis Alfonso Giagni Stadium in Asunción. The final score was a 1–1 tie.

=== Club América ===
On 27 December 2016 he was confirmed by Club América for the 2017 Clausura Tournament of Liga MX. He played in two total games for his new club, both in the Copa MX, scoring his only goal on 1 March 2017 against Santos Laguna in a 2–1 loss.

=== Portland Timbers ===
On 2 February 2018, Paredes was acquired by Portland Timbers on loan from Mexican side Club América. The move was made permanent on 6 February 2020.
