= Marvin Loría =

Costa Rican football player (born 1997)

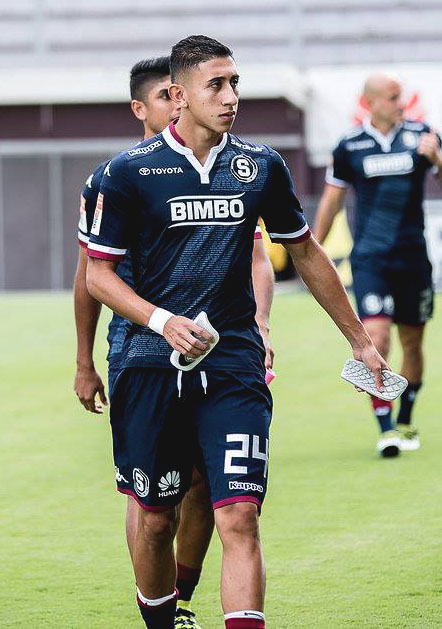
- Loría with Saprissa in 2016

Personal information
- Full name: Marvin Antonio Loría Leitón
- Date of birth: 24 April 1997 (age 29)
- Place of birth: San José, Costa Rica
- Height: 1.78 m (5 ft 10 in)
- Position: Winger

Team information
- Current team: PSIM Yogyakarta
- Number: 7

Senior career*
Years	Team	Apps	(Gls)
2013–2019	Saprissa	10	(0)
2015–2016	→ Benfica B (loan)	0	(0)
2018	→ Portland Timbers 2 (loan)	31	(6)
2019–2024	Portland Timbers	116	(6)
2019–2022	Portland Timbers 2	12	(6)
2025–2026	Saprissa	39	(8)
2026–	PSIM Yogyakarta	1	(0)

International career
2017	Costa Rica U20	4	(0)
2021	Costa Rica U23	2	(0)
2019	Costa Rica	1	(0)
- * Club domestic league appearances and goals as of 13 September 2026

Marvin Antonio Loría Leitón (born 24 April 1997) is a Costa Rican professional footballer who plays as a winger for Super League club PSIM Yogyakarta.

== Club career ==
Loría came through the academy at Deportivo Saprissa, making his professional debut for the club on 24 November 2013 in a 1–1 draw with Cartaginés. He spent time on loan with Benfica B, before moving abroad again on 9 March 2018 to the United States with USL side Portland Timbers 2.

Loría signed a first-team contract with Portland Timbers of Major League Soccer in December 2018. In his debut match, Loria scored his first MLS goal with his very first shot on 22 June 2019.

Portland declined Loría's contract option following their 2024 season.

== International ==
On 2 February 2019, he made his debut for the Costa Rica national team as a starter in a friendly against the United States.

== Honours ==
Saprissa

- Liga FPD: Apertura 2016, Clausura 2018

Portland Timbers

- MLS is Back Tournament: 2020
