= Dairon Asprilla =

Colombian footballer (born 1992)

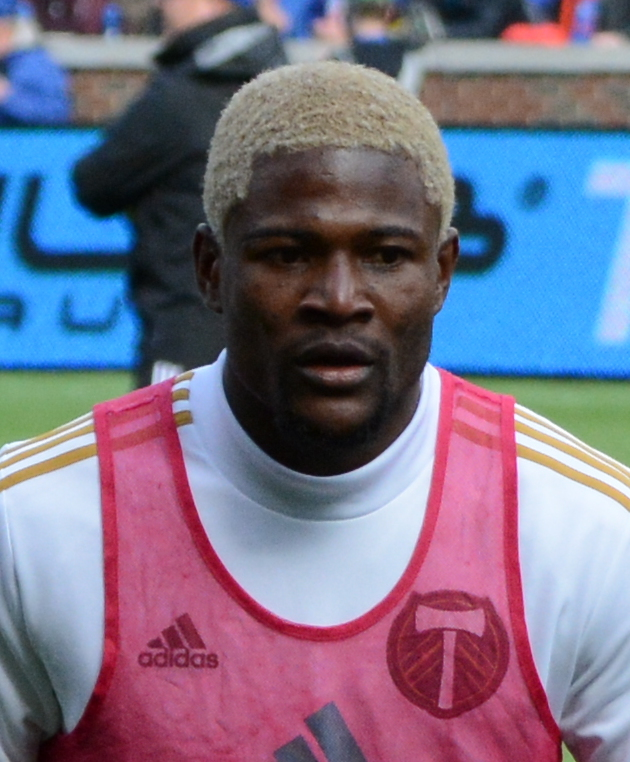
- Asprilla with the Portland Timbers in 2019

Personal information
- Full name: Dairon Estibens Asprilla Rivas
- Date of birth: May 25, 1992 (age 34)
- Place of birth: Istmina, Chocó, Colombia
- Height: 1.80 m (5 ft 11 in)
- Position: Winger

Team information
- Current team: Atlético Nacional
- Number: 27

Senior career*
Years	Team	Apps	(Gls)
2010–2014	Atlético Nacional	0	(0)
2012–2014	→ Alianza Petrolera (loan)	71	(22)
2015–2024	Portland Timbers	203	(33)
2015–2019	Portland Timbers 2	16	(11)
2016	→ Millonarios (loan)	16	(2)
2024–2026	Atlético Nacional	76	(11)
2026–	Bolívar	3	(2)
- * Club domestic league appearances and goals as of 30 July 2026

Dairon Estibens Asprilla Rivas (born May 25, 1992) is a Colombian professional footballer who plays as a winger for FBF División Profesional club Bolívar.

== Professional career ==
Asprilla debuted for Alianza Petrolera in his native Colombia when he was 20 years old. For 2015, he was the second top goalscorer of the club with 22 goals. After several years playing in Colombia, Asprilla signed with MLS club Portland Timbers on December 8, 2014.

Asprilla played over 200 games for the Timbers, winning MLS Cup 2015 while at the club and scoring 33 goals to rank among the club's top MLS scorers. In his time with the Timbers, Asprilla was seen as a "cult hero." He scored iconic goals in the MLS Playoffs but struggled with consistency. He was sent out on loan in 2016 after failing to impact the team, and suffered a knee injury in 2020. 2021 was considered his best season yet, registering 10 goals and 3 assists, resulting in a Timbers Army Supporters' Player of the Year award. On October 27th, 2021, in the second half of a home match against San Jose, Asprilla scored an incredible overhead kick goal from outside the box.

== Honours ==
Portland Timbers

- MLS Cup: 2015
- Western Conference (playoffs): 2015, 2018, 2021
- MLS is Back Tournament: 2020

Atlético Nacional

- Copa Colombia: 2024
- Categoría Primera A : 2024 Finalización
