= 2025 Portland Timbers season =

Portland Timbers
2025 season
- General manager: Ned Grabavoy
- Head coach: Phil Neville
- Stadium: Providence Park; Portland, Oregon (Capacity: 25,218)
- Major League Soccer: Conference: 8th Overall: 17th
- MLS Cup playoffs: Round one
- U.S. Open Cup: Round of 16
- Leagues Cup: League phase
- Top goalscorer: League: Antony (6); All: Kevin Kelsy (7)
- Highest home attendance: 25,218
- Lowest home attendance: 11,515
- Average home league attendance: 22,134
- Biggest win: Portland 4–0 San Luis (July 30)
- Biggest defeat: Portland 0–4 San Diego (October 18)
Primary colors	Away colors

The 2025 Portland Timbers season was the 39th season in their existence and the 15th season for the Portland Timbers in Major League Soccer (MLS), the top-flight professional soccer league in the United States and Canada.

The 2025 Timbers season marked the 50th anniversary, of the original Portland Timbers' inaugural season, in the North American Soccer League. The club revealed plans of commemorating the anniversary throughout their season campaign, along with their 10th anniversary winning the MLS Cup.

== Competitions ==
=== Major League Soccer ===
==== MLS regular season ====
===== Western Conference =====
MLS Western Conference table (2025)
Pos	Team	Pld	W	L	T	GF	GA	GD	Pts	Qualification
6	Austin FC	34	13	13	8	37	45	−8	47	Qualification for round one
7	FC Dallas	34	11	12	11	52	55	−3	44	Qualification for round one
8	Portland Timbers	34	11	12	11	41	48	−7	44	Qualification for the wild-card round
9	Real Salt Lake	34	12	17	5	38	49	−11	41	Qualification for the wild-card round
10	San Jose Earthquakes	34	11	15	8	60	63	−3	41	

Source: MLS
Rules for classification: 1) points; 2) total wins; 3) total goal differential; 4) total goals scored; 5) fewer disciplinary points; 6) away goal differential; 7) away goals scored; 8) home goals differential; 9) home goals scored; 10) coin toss (2 clubs tied) or drawing of lots (≥3 clubs tied)

===== Overall standings =====
Overall MLS standings table (2025)
Pos	Team	Pld	W	L	T	GF	GA	GD	Pts
15	Austin FC	34	13	13	8	37	45	−8	47
16	FC Dallas	34	11	12	11	52	55	−3	44
17	Portland Timbers	34	11	12	11	41	48	−7	44
18	New York Red Bulls	34	12	15	7	48	47	+1	43
19	Real Salt Lake	34	12	17	5	38	49	−11	41

Source: MLS
Rules for classification: 1) points; 2) total wins; 3) total goal differential; 4) total goals scored; 5) fewer disciplinary points; 6) away goal differential; 7) away goals scored; 8) home goals differential; 9) home goals scored; 10) coin toss (2 clubs tied) or drawing of lots (≥3 clubs tied)

===== Matches =====
Win Draw Loss Upcoming fixture

February 23 1 Cascadia Cup	Portland Timbers	1−4	Vancouver Whitecaps FC	Portland, Oregon
13:00 PST	K. Miller (red card) 11'; Fory (yellow card) 63'; Antony 73'	Report	Gauld 24', (yellow card) 89'; Vite 32'; Cubas (yellow card) 37'; Adekugbe 53'; Nelson 61'	Stadium: Providence Park; Attendance: 20,079; Referee: Victor Rivas

March 1 2	Portland Timbers	1−0	Austin FC	Portland, Oregon
19:30 PST	McGraw (yellow card) 39'; Antony (yellow card) 53'; Fory (yellow card) 55'; J. Ortiz (yellow card) 64'; da Costa 89'; Paredes (yellow card) 90+1'	Report	Pereira (yellow card) 44'	Stadium: Providence Park; Attendance: 20,032; Referee: Ismir Pekmic

March 8 3	Nashville SC	2−0	Portland Timbers	Nashville, Tennessee
17:30 PST	Najar 45+3'; Qasem 68'	Report	McGraw (yellow card) 5'; Ayala (yellow card) 83'	Stadium: Geodis Park; Attendance: 24,432; Referee: Filip Dujic

March 16 4	Portland Timbers	1−1	LA Galaxy	Portland, Oregon
13:30 PDT	Fory (yellow card) 26'; Mora 49'	Report	Miller (yellow card) 47'; Ramírez 81'; Garcés (yellow card) 90+6'	Stadium: Providence Park; Attendance: 20,153; Referee: Lukasz Szpala

March 22 5	Colorado Rapids	0−3	Portland Timbers	Commerce City, Colorado
18:30 PDT		Report	Atencio 45+2' (o.g.); Antony 48'; Kelsy 75'	Stadium: Dick's Sporting Goods Park; Attendance: 15,131; Referee: Jair Marrufo

March 30 6	Portland Timbers	3−1	Houston Dynamo FC	Portland, Oregon
16:00 PDT	Mora 6', (yellow card) 34'; Chará (yellow card) 11'; Antony 23', 71'; Fory (yellow card) 43'	Report	Escobar 12'; Steres (yellow card) 31'; Dorsey (yellow card) 55'	Stadium: Providence Park; Attendance: 20,206; Referee: Pierre-Luc Lauziere

April 5 7	Austin FC	0−0	Portland Timbers	Austin, Texas
16:30 PDT	Wolff (yellow card) 28'; Sabovic (yellow card) 61'; Gallagher (yellow card) 90+2'	Report	Da Costa (yellow card) 68'; Fory (yellow card) 73'; Antony (yellow card) 75'	Stadium: Q2 Stadium; Attendance: 20,738; Referee: Drew Fischer

April 13 8	Sporting Kansas City	2−4	Portland Timbers	Kansas City, Kansas
11:00 PDT	Suleymanov 16'; Joveljić 33' (pen.); Fernández (yellow card) 45+6'	Report	Ayala 10'; Smith (yellow card) 22'; Kelsy 26', 49'; Antony (yellow card) 28'; Miller 54' (o.g.); Chará (yellow card) 58'; Lassiter (yellow card) 78'	Stadium: Children's Mercy Park; Attendance: 17,898; Referee: Pierre-Luc Lauziere

April 19 9	Portland Timbers	3−3	Los Angeles FC	Portland, Oregon
19:00 PDT	Mora 8' (pen.), 66'; Fory (yellow card) 18'; Ayala (yellow card) 35'; Moreno 42'; Rodríguez (yellow card) 63'; Da Costa (yellow card) 76'	Report	Giroud 45'; Delgado (yellow card) 45+3'; Bouanga (yellow card) 45+3', (goal) 90' (pen.); Martínez 64'; Hollingshead (yellow card) 78'; Palencia (yellow card) 90+4'	Stadium: Providence Park; Attendance: 24,538; Referee: Guido Gonzales Jr.

April 27 10	LA Galaxy	2−4	Portland Timbers	Carson, California
14:00 PDT	Paintsil (yellow card) 45+1'; Ramirez 67'; Reus 69'; Yoshida (yellow card) 82'	Report	Da Costa 38'; Moreno 53'; Kelsy 63'; Rodriguez 76' (pen.), (yellow card) 77'; K. Miller (yellow card) 90+4'	Stadium: Dignity Health Sports Park; Attendance: 21,215; Referee: Filip Dujic

May 3 11	San Jose Earthquakes	4−1	Portland Timbers	San Jose, California
19:30 PDT	Espinoza 16', 24'; Arango 27'; Harkes (yellow card) 38'; Munie (yellow card) 40'; Romney (yellow card) 55'; Bouda 88'; Costa (yellow card) 90+4'	Report	Mora 42'; K. Miller (yellow card) 90+2'	Stadium: PayPal Park; Attendance: 12,122; Referee: Fotis Bazakos

May 10 12	Portland Timbers	1−0	Sporting Kansas City	Portland, Oregon
19:30 PDT	Moreno 10'; Bravo (yellow card) 67'	Report	Suleymanov (yellow card) 73'; Davis (yellow card) 74'	Stadium: Providence Park; Attendance: 21,287; Referee: Ricardo Fierro

May 14 13	Real Salt Lake	0−0	Portland Timbers	Sandy, Utah
18:30 PDT	Hidalgo (yellow card) 21'; Caliskan (yellow card) 62'; Luna (yellow card) 69'	Report	Paredes (yellow card) 46'	Stadium: America First Field; Attendance: 19,616; Referee: Drew Fischer

May 17 14 Cascadia Cup	Portland Timbers	1−1	Seattle Sounders FC	Portland, Oregon
19:30 PDT	Ayala (yellow card) 23'; K. Miller (yellow card) 34'; Moreno 36'	Report	Rusnak 30'; Nouhou (yellow card) 50'	Stadium: Providence Park; Attendance: 25,218; Referee: Rosendo Mendoza

May 24 15	Orlando City SC	1−0	Portland Timbers	Orlando, Florida
16:30 PDT	McGuire 39'; Angulo (yellow card) 74'; Schlegel (yellow card) 90+5'; Jansson (yellow card) 90+7'	Report	Antony (yellow card) 66'; Župarić (yellow card) 90+3'	Stadium: Inter&Co Stadium; Attendance: 21,256; Referee: Jair Marrufo

May 28 16	Portland Timbers	2−1	Colorado Rapids	Portland, Oregon
19:30 PDT	Surman (yellow card) 29'; Antony 59'; Kelsy 76'; Moreno (yellow card) 83'	Report	Mihailovic 33'; Frederick (red card) 67'; Cabral (yellow card) 90+7'	Stadium: Providence Park; Attendance: 20,012; Referee: Chris Penso

June 8 18	Portland Timbers	2−1	St. Louis City SC	Portland, Oregon
16:00 PDT	Fory (yellow card) 13'; Antony 55'; Ayala 90+2'; K. Miller (yellow card) 90+4'; Mora (yellow card) 90+8'	Report	Baumgartl (yellow card) 45'; Watts 50'; Becher (yellow card) 68'	Stadium: Providence Park; Attendance: 21,675; Referee: Malik Badawi

June 13 19	Portland Timbers	1−1	San Jose Earthquakes	Portland, Oregon
19:30 PDT	Mosquera 71'	Report	Harkes (yellow card) 34' (yellow-red card) 52'; Espinoza (yellow card) 39'; Jones (yellow card) 46'; Judd 90+3'	Stadium: Providence Park; Attendance: 22,157; Referee: Victor Rivas

June 28 20	Toronto FC	3−0	Portland Timbers	Toronto, Ontario
16:30 PDT	Coello 11'; Spicer 56'; Smith 90+1'; Thompson (yellow card) 90+5'	Report	Župarić (yellow card) 43'; Fory (yellow card) 68'; Ayala (yellow card) 77'; Kelsy (yellow card) 90'	Stadium: BMO Field; Attendance: 22,445; Referee: Rosendo Mendoza

July 5 21	Portland Timbers	2−1	New England Revolution	Portland, Oregon
19:30 PDT	Smith 20'; da Costa 72'	Report	Langoni 35'	Stadium: Providence Park; Attendance: 22,776; Referee: Jon Freeman

July 13 22	St. Louis City SC	2−1	Portland Timbers	St. Louis, Missouri
16:00 PDT	Hartel 54', 67'; Klauss (yellow card) 90+2'; Orozco (yellow card) 90+3'	Report	da Costa 19'; J. Ortiz (yellow card) 59'; Kelsy (yellow card) 64'; Mosquera (yellow card) 77'; K. Miller (yellow card) 79'	Stadium: Energizer Park; Attendance: 22,423; Referee: Ricardo Montero

July 16 23	Portland Timbers	0−1	Real Salt Lake	Portland, Oregon
19:30 PDT	Mora (yellow card) 69'	Report	Vera (yellow card) 45'; Ruiz (yellow card) 52'; Hidalgo (yellow card) 67'; Gonçalves 83'; Cabral (yellow card) 90+8'	Stadium: Providence Park; Attendance: 21,772; Referee: Alexis Da Silva

July 19 24	Portland Timbers	1−1	Minnesota United FC	Portland, Oregon
19:30 PDT	Lassiter (yellow card) 43'; Fernandez 90+2'	Report	Romero (yellow card) 39'; Harvey (yellow card) 45'; Pereyra (yellow card) 65'; Markanich 77'	Stadium: Providence Park; Attendance: 23,507; Referee: Ricardo Fierro

July 25 25	Los Angeles FC	0−1	Portland Timbers	Los Angeles, California
19:30 PDT	Tafari (yellow card) 70'	Report	Paredes 45', (yellow card) 65'	Stadium: BMO Stadium; Attendance: 22,103; Referee: Armando Villarreal

August 9 26	FC Dallas	2−0	Portland Timbers	Frisco, Texas
17:30 PDT	Musa 8'; Delgado (yellow card) 29'; Abubakar 62'; Farrington (yellow card) 73'	Report	Paredes (yellow card) 24'	Stadium: Toyota Stadium; Attendance: 11,004; Referee: Malik Badawi

August 16 27	Portland Timbers	2−3	FC Cincinnati	Portland, Oregon
19:30 PDT	Kelsy (yellow card) 13' (goal) 38', 68' (pen.); Paredes (yellow card) 60'	Report	Denkey 10'; Bucha 25'; Evander 36'; Robinson (yellow card) 45+3'	Stadium: Providence Park; Attendance: 25,218; Referee: Rubiel Vazquez

August 23 28	San Diego FC	0−0	Portland Timbers	San Diego, California
19:30 PDT	de la Torre (yellow card) 25'; Dreyer (yellow card) 33'; McVey (yellow card) 70'	Report		Stadium: Snapdragon Stadium; Attendance: 27,810; Referee: Rosendo Mendoza

August 30 29	Minnesota United FC	1−1	Portland Timbers	Saint Paul, Minnesota
17:30 PDT	Rosales (yellow card) 33'; Gressel (yellow card) 78'; Lod 85'; Pereyra (yellow card) 90+3'	Report	Romero 79' (o.g.)	Stadium: Allianz Field; Attendance: 19,169; Referee: Jair Marrufo

September 13 30	Portland Timbers	2−1	New York Red Bulls	Portland, Oregon
19:30 PDT	Rojas 28'; Velde (yellow card) 36'; Fory (yellow card) 61'; Antony 73'	Report	Stroud (yellow card) 38'; Choupo-Moting (yellow card) 45+1'; Forsberg 70'	Stadium: Providence Park; Attendance: 22,170; Referee: Joe Dickerson

September 20 31	Houston Dynamo FC	1−0	Portland Timbers	Houston, Texas
17:30 PDT	P. Ortiz (yellow card) 38'; Ponce 44'; Raines (yellow card) 58'; Dorsey (yellow card) 63'; Urso (yellow card) 70'; Sviatchenko (yellow card) 80'	Report	J. Ortiz (yellow card) 21'; Župarić (yellow card) 73'	Stadium: Shell Energy Stadium; Attendance: 18,357; Referee: Allen Chapman

September 24 17 Cascadia Cup	Vancouver Whitecaps FC	1−1	Portland Timbers	Vancouver, British Columbia
19:30 PDT	Halbouni (yellow card) 57'; White 88'	Report	K. Miller 39'; Župarić (yellow card) 47'; Paredes (yellow card) 67'; Smith (yellow card) 71'; Chará (yellow card) 74'	Stadium: BC Place; Attendance: 20,212; Referee: Jon Freemon
Note: This match was originally scheduled for May 31, but was rescheduled due to the Vancouver Whitecaps participating in the 2025 CONCACAF Champions Cup final.

September 27 32	Portland Timbers	2−2	FC Dallas	Portland, Oregon
19:30 PDT	Mosquera (yellow card) 23'; Ramiro 45+2' (o.g.); Antony (yellow card) 63'; Surman (yellow card) 70'; Smith (yellow card) 78'; Paredes 81'	Report	Jackson (yellow card) 45+1'; Moore (yellow card) 57'; Musa 73' (pen.); Julio 85'	Stadium: Providence Park; Attendance: 24,611; Referee: Chris Penso

October 4 33 Cascadia Cup	Seattle Sounders FC	1−0	Portland Timbers	Seattle, Washington
19:30 PDT	de la Vega 16'; Rusnák (red card) 90+6'	Report	Smith (yellow card) 78'	Stadium: Lumen Field; Attendance: 32,913; Referee: Rubiel Vazquez

October 18 34	Portland Timbers	0−4	San Diego FC	Portland, Oregon
18:00 PDT	Paredes (yellow card) 42'; J. Ortiz (yellow card) 51'	Report	Pellegrino 26', 63'; Dreyer 47', 49'; Godoy (yellow card) 65'	Stadium: Providence Park; Attendance: 24,920; Referee: Victor Rivas

=== MLS Cup playoffs ===
==== Wild Card ====
October 22 Wild Card	Portland Timbers	3−1	Real Salt Lake	Portland, Oregon
19:30 PDT	Mora 24', 35'; K. Miller 82'	Report	Caliskan (yellow card) 23'; Glad 39'; Vera (yellow card) 74'; Yedlin (yellow card) 79'; Luna (yellow card) 84'; Katranis (yellow card) 88'	Stadium: Providence Park; Attendance: 16,243; Referee: Guido Gonzales Jr.

==== Round One ====
October 26 Round One	San Diego FC	2−1	Portland Timbers	San Diego, California
18:30 PDT	Valakari 23'; Dreyer 30'; Bombino (yellow card) 90+1'; Pilcher (yellow card) 90+7'	Report	Velde 36', (yellow card) 90+7'; Fory (yellow card) 65' (yellow-red card) 66'	Stadium: Snapdragon Stadium; Attendance: 32,500; Referee: Chris Penso

November 1 Round One	Portland Timbers	2–2 (3–2 p)	San Diego FC	Portland, Oregon
18:30 PDT	Velde 18', (yellow card) 52'; Kelsy (yellow card) 45'; Chará (yellow card) 62'; Župarić (yellow card) 90+5'; Guerra 90+8'	Report	McVey (yellow card) 43'; Pellegrino 45+12', (yellow card) 69'; Lozano 51', (yellow card) 82'; McNair (yellow card) 72'	Stadium: Providence Park; Attendance: 19,260; Referee: Drew Fischer
	Penalties
	Mora (penalty scored); Paredes (penalty missed); Fernandez (penalty missed); Velde (penalty scored); Antony (penalty scored)		(penalty scored) Dreyer; (penalty scored) Lozano; (penalty missed) Valakari; (penalty missed) Ingvartsen; (penalty missed) Tverskov

November 9 Round One	San Diego FC	4–0	Portland Timbers	San Diego, California
18:00 PST	Dreyer 5', 79'; Pellegrino 17', 53'; Duah (yellow card) 36'; Baird (yellow card) 55'; Bombino (yellow card) 75'	Report	Fory (yellow card) 29'; Paredes (yellow card) 66'; Ayala (yellow card) 71'; Mosquera (red card) 80'; K. Miller (yellow card) 86'	Stadium: Snapdragon Stadium; Attendance: 32,500; Referee: Joe Dickerson

=== U.S. Open Cup ===
May 6 Round of 32	Tacoma Defiance (Washington (state))	2−3	(Oregon) Portland Timbers	Tukwila, Washington
19:00 PDT	De Rosario 48'; Tsukanome 50'; Brunell (yellow card) 63'; Kingston (yellow card) 73'	Report	McGraw 34'; Guerra 81'; Kelsy 90+4'	Stadium: Starfire Sports Complex; Attendance: 1,792; Referee: Servando Berna

May 20 Round of 16	San Jose Earthquakes (California)	1−0 (a.e.t.)	(Oregon) Portland Timbers	San Jose, California
19:30 PDT	López (yellow card) 40'; Romney (yellow card) 77'; Costa (yellow card) 92'; Floriani (yellow card) 107'; Skahan 116'	Report	Antony (yellow card) 39'; Župarić (yellow card) 75'; Mora (yellow card) 86'; K. Miller (yellow card) 87'; Rodríguez (yellow card) 87'	Stadium: PayPal Park; Referee: Ramy Touchan

=== Leagues Cup ===
July 30 Group Stage	Portland Timbers (United States)	4–0	(Mexico) Atlético San Luis	Portland, Oregon
19:30 PDT	Da Costa 1'; Mosquera (yellow card) 35'; Kelsy (yellow card) 44', (goal) 56'; Lassiter 73'; Mora 78'	Report	Galdames (yellow card) 34'; Águila (yellow card) 40'; Sanabria (yellow card) 90+2'	Stadium: Providence Park; Attendance: 11,515; Referee: Ismael Cornejo

August 2 Group Stage	Portland Timbers (United States)	1–0	(Mexico) Querétaro	Portland, Oregon
20:00 PDT	Kelsy (yellow card) 35'; Paredes 36'; Smith (yellow card) 38'	Report	Perlaza (yellow card) 45+1' (yellow-red card)	Stadium: Providence Park; Attendance: 13,355; Referee: Jesus Lopez

August 6 Group Stage	América (Mexico)	1–1 (5–3 p)	(United States) Portland Timbers	Austin, Texas
18:30 PDT	Rodríguez (yellow card) 25'; Sánchez (yellow card) 50'; Juárez 53'; Zendejas (yellow card) 87'	Report	Lassiter 7'; Fory (yellow card) 49' (yellow-red card) 62'; Crépeau (yellow card) 87'	Stadium: Q2 Stadium; Attendance: 9,796; Referee: Guido Gonzales Jr.
	Penalties
	Rodríguez (penalty scored); Zendejas (penalty scored); Reyes (penalty scored); Aguirre (penalty scored); Martín (penalty scored)		Paredes (penalty scored); Miller (penalty missed); Antony (penalty scored); Guerra (penalty scored)

==== Goals ====
As of February 22, 2025

Name	Nat	Games	Goals

== Transfers ==
Per league and club policy, terms of the deals are not disclosed except Targeted Allocation Money, General Allocation Money, draft picks, and international rosters spots.

=== Transfers in ===
Pos.	Player	Transferred from	Fee/notes	Date	Source
FW	(Costa Rica) Ariel Lassiter	(United States) Chicago Fire	Free	December 23, 2024	
MF	(Ecuador) Joao Ortiz	(Ecuador) Independiente del Valle	Transfer	January 15, 2025	
FW	(Venezuela) Kevin Kelsy	(Ukraine) Shakhtar Donetsk	Transfer/Up to $175,000 GAM to FC Cincinnati for Kelsy's MLS rights	January 22, 2025	
DF	(United States) Ian Smith	(United States) Denver Pioneers	2025 MLS SuperDraft	January 31, 2025	
DF	(Colombia) Jimer Fory	(Colombia) Independiente Medellín	Transfer	February 4, 2025	
MF	(Portugal) David Da Costa	(France) RC Lens	Transfer	February 17, 2025	
FW	(United States) Gage Guerra	(United States) Portland Timbers 2	Free	June 26, 2025	
FW	(Norway) Kristoffer Velde	(Greece) Olympiacos	Transfer/Designated Player	August 13, 2025	
MF	(Uruguay) Felipe Carballo	(Brazil) Grêmio	Loan/Designated Player	August 14, 2025	
MF	(Paraguay) Matías Rojas	(Argentina) River Plate	Free	August 19, 2025	

=== Transfers out ===
Pos.	Player	Transferred to	Fee/notes	Date	Source
FW	(United States) Tega Ikoba	(United States) FC Cincinnati 2	Free	November 4, 2025	
FW	(Costa Rica) Marvin Loría	(Costa Rica) Saprissa	Free	November 4, 2025	
FW	(United States) Mason Toye	(United States) Sporting Kansas City	Free	January 11, 2025	
MF	(United States) Eryk Williamson	(United States) Charlotte FC	$100,000 GAM	January 15, 2025	
GK	(United States) Hunter Sulte	(United States) Indy Eleven	Loan	February 4, 2025	
MF	(Brazil) Evander	(United States) FC Cincinnati	$12,000,000 + $150,000 conditional	February 17, 2025	
MF	(Colombia) Santiago Moreno	(Brazil) Fluminense FC	Transfer	August 12, 2025	

== Team statistics ==
=== MLS regular season ===
==== Goals ====
As of February 22, 2025

Name	Nat	Games	Goals

==== Assists ====
As of February 22, 2025

Name	Nat	Games	Assists

==== Goalkeeping ====
As of February 22, 2025

Name	Nat	Games	Saves	Clean Sheets
