= Portland Timbers =

American professional soccer club based in Portland, Oregon

- Nicknames: PTFC; The Timbers; Rose City
- Founded: March 20, 2009; 17 years ago (Note: The MLS franchise was announced on March 20, 2009, but did not begin play until 2011. Three previous incarnations of the club competed in the North American Soccer League (1975–1982), the Western Soccer League (1985–1990) and the USL First Division (2001–2010).)
- Stadium: Providence Park; Portland, Oregon
- Capacity: 24,686
- Owner: Peregrine Sports
- CEO & GM: Heather Davis & Ned Grabavoy
- Head coach: Martí Cifuentes
- League: Major League Soccer
- 2026: Western Conference: 7th Overall: 14th Playoffs: TBD
- Website: timbers.com
Home colors	Away colors	Third colors

The Portland Timbers are an American professional soccer club based in Portland, Oregon. The Timbers compete in Major League Soccer (MLS) as a member of the Western Conference. The Timbers have played their home matches at Providence Park since 2011, when the team began play as an expansion team in the league.

Peregrine Sports, under the majority ownership of Merritt Paulson, was awarded an expansion berth by Major League Soccer in 2009 to operate a Portland team. Paulson had acquired the second-division incarnation of the Timbers in 2007 and later established the Portland Thorns women's team in 2012. The MLS team is a phoenix club, and the fourth soccer franchise based in Portland (second top-level) to carry the legacy of the Timbers name, which originated with the team that competed in the North American Soccer League (NASL) from 1975 to 1982.

In 2013, the Timbers finished the regular season in first place in the Western Conference, clinching both their first-ever playoff appearance and a CONCACAF Champions League berth. In 2015, the franchise won the Western Conference Finals in the playoffs, and their first major trophy, the MLS Cup, becoming the first team in Cascadia to do so. In 2017, the club again finished the regular season in first place in the Western Conference. In 2018, the Timbers again made the playoffs, advancing in three rounds, defeating archrival Seattle in the semifinals along the way, and made the MLS Cup where they lost 2–0 to Atlanta United FC. In 2020, the Timbers won the one-off MLS is Back Tournament, defeating Orlando City SC in the final, and once again qualified for the Champions League. In 2021, the Timbers won the Western Conference and once again were runners-up in MLS Cup, falling to New York City FC 4–2 on penalties after a 1–1 score at extra time.

Portland has long-standing rivalries with nearby clubs Seattle Sounders and Vancouver Whitecaps FC, with whom they compete for the Cascadia Cup.

== History ==
=== Soccer roots in Portland and first MLS seasons ===
Following England's World Cup victory in 1966, there was a significant increase in popularity of soccer in english speaking countries. The United States were heavily influenced and it paved the way for cities like Portland, Oregon to embrace the sport. The growth of professional soccer in Portland can be traced to the Portland Timbers, the city's expansion team in the top-level North American Soccer League (NASL) as an expansion team from 1975 until the club's seventh season in 1982. The club's major achievement was in their inaugural season during the league's playoffs, having won the league's division final, and runners-up in Soccer Bowl '75 losing to the Tampa Bay Rowdies in the championship match. This achievement helped to not only bring significantly more attention to the sport in Portland, but also bring more fans and more recognition to the Portland Timbers name. In 1985, F.C. Portland had established and was a charter club in the Western Soccer Alliance League and competed until folding in 1990. Professional soccer was dormant in the city until 2001, when the USL Timbers was founded and competed in Division 2 soccer in USL pro until the club folded in 2010. The USL club finished with the best record in the league in both the 2004 and 2009 regular seasons.

Back when the Portland Timbers joined the NASL in 1975, their first manager was Vic Crowe, who was Welsh and brought many of that inaugural 1975 team's players from the West Midlands of England. Numerous members of the team were on loan for the summer from clubs in that area. Chris Dangerfield was one of the members of the 1975 team on loan from the Wolverhampton Wanderers in Birmingham. Like many of his teammates, he spent his time off the pitch talking to Portlanders and was a key part of building the culture of not only soccer in Portland, but also helping the Timbers to become a key part of the identity of the city. While there is much less of a need for building awareness of soccer now in Portland as there once was, team members maintaining relationships and volunteering in the community has stuck as part of the culture of the modern era Portland Timbers.

Prior to the Timbers's first season in NASL, they made their first signing, a player named Michael 'Mick' Hoban. Hoban spent his early career in England for Aston Villa, and played a few seasons in the United States for the Denver dynamos and the Atlanta Chiefs. He was a part of that team that made it to the Soccer Bowl 75', and Hoban once said that the team were very interactive with the fans, which was unusual to him compared to his time with other teams, and he said he believed this helped build a great community. Off the field, Hoban was crucial to the growth of the Timbers attention and sport in the city. Hoban took on the role of the team's Community Relations Manager, where he strived to spread awareness for the game. He helped the team host clinics in which the rules of soccer were explained and people were given the chance to experience the game for themselves to adults and children alike. Hoban stated that they hosted around a thousand community events in the first three years. Hoban has continued his contributions to the city for years onward and as a coach for youth amateur and professional levels. The Portland Timbers acknowledged his contributions by awarding him the Ring of Honor in 2014.

The announcement of the Timbers' entry into MLS was the culmination of a nearly two-year-long process for Merritt Paulson, dating back at least to May 2007, when Paulson led a group that bought the Portland Beavers and the USL Timbers. The group included former Treasury Secretary Henry Paulson, Meritt Paulson's father. The biggest issue for the city of Portland at that time was that due to league concerns about seating configuration, field surface and scheduling, obtaining an MLS club would require a new stadium.

In October 2007, Paulson was told PGE Park could be upgraded for about $20 million, and a new baseball stadium (with 8,000 to 9,000 seats) would cost about $30 million. By November 2008, Paulson told The New York Times he expected Portland taxpayers would spend $85 million to "build a new baseball stadium for his Beavers and renovate PGE Park—just remodeled in 2001 at a cost to taxpayers of $38.5 million—for soccer", and that in exchange, he would spend $40 million for the franchise fee to bring a new Major League Soccer team to Portland. MLS was in support of the proposal, wanting to continue to expand the number of owners in the league (for a while, all of its teams were owned by three men: Philip Anschutz, Lamar Hunt, and Robert Kraft).

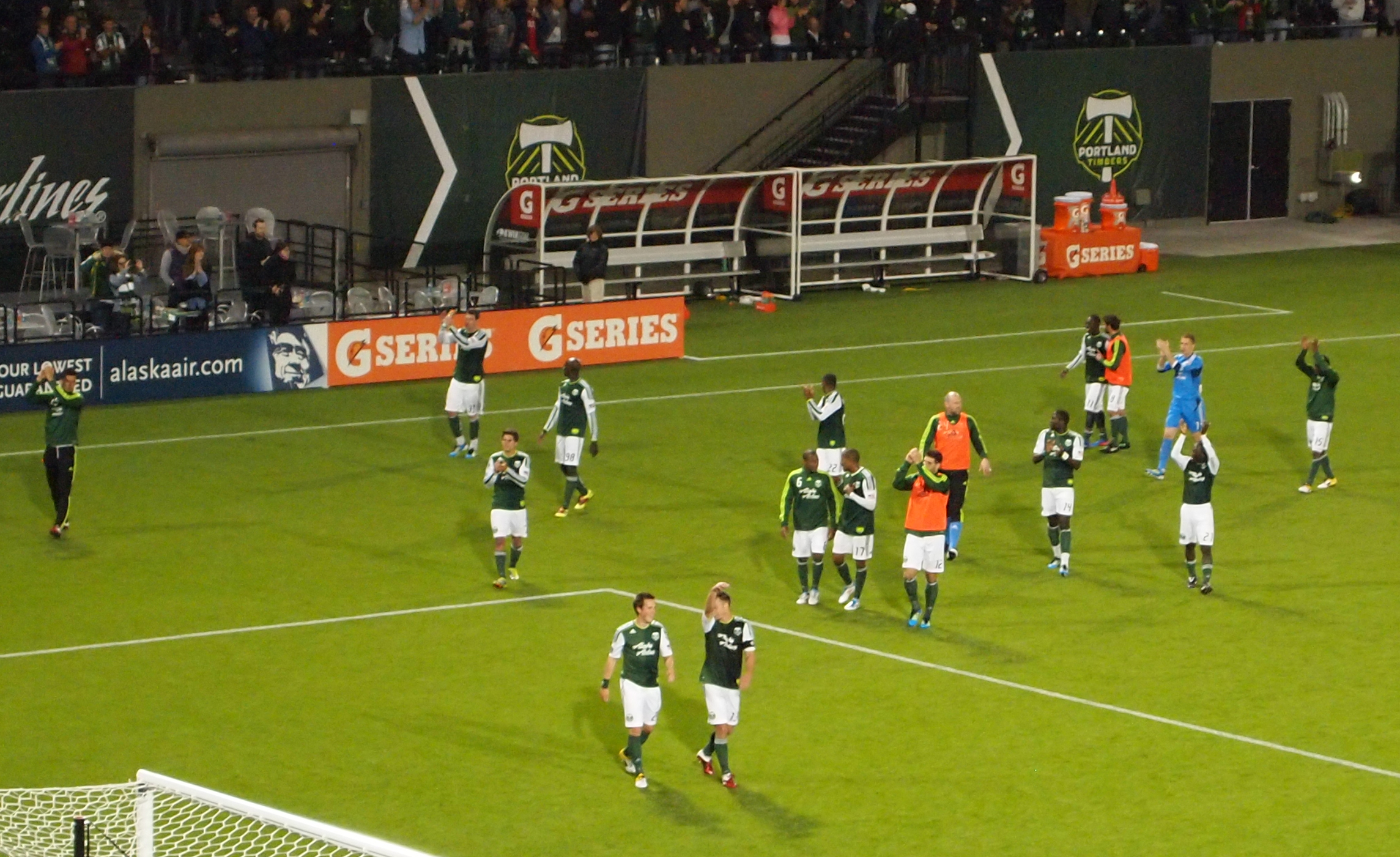
Timbers thank their fans after a home victory

Though supporting the acquisition of an MLS franchise raised numerous issues for Mayor Sam Adams and the Portland City Council, the Timbers were announced as Major League Soccer's eighteenth team on March 20, 2009, by Commissioner Don Garber. The announcement occurred during the first and second-round games of the 2009 NCAA Men's Division I Basketball Tournament that were held in Portland. The announcement noted that the team would retain the Portland Timbers name.

Retaining the original name reflects the long-standing cultural presence of the Timbers in Portland, which remained through multiple iterations of the team. Former Timbers owner Merritt Paulson explained that changing the name was unlikely due to its strong history and supporter loyalty. This fan connection later became closely involved in the club's organized supporter group, the Timbers Army.

Former forward and Colorado Rapids assistant coach John Spencer was named the first head coach of the Timbers on August 10, 2010. It was also announced that former head coach Gavin Wilkinson of the USL-1/USSF D-2 Timbers, was promoted as the general manager/technical director of the team.

The Timbers signed five players before the MLS Expansion Draft on November 24, 2010. Three were part of the Timbers D-2 Pro League squad in 2010 (Steve Cronin, Bright Dike, and Ryan Pore), one was signed from D-2 Pro League team Austin Aztex (forward Eddie Johnson) and one was acquired via trade with New York Red Bulls (midfielder Jeremy Hall). On November 24, 2010, the Timbers, along with the other 2011 expansion team, Vancouver Whitecaps FC, participated in an MLS Expansion Draft, each selecting 10 players from existing teams. Immediately after the Expansion Draft, the Timbers announced the trade of their first pick (midfielder Dax McCarty), from FC Dallas to D.C. United for defender Rodney Wallace. The Timbers and Whitecaps also participated in the 2011 MLS SuperDraft on January 13, 2011, with the Whitecaps having the first pick, and the Timbers having the second pick. Vancouver surprised some by selecting youngster Omar Salgado and Portland swiftly selected Akron midfielder/forward Darlington Nagbe.

The Timbers played their first MLS game on March 19, 2011, against reigning MLS champions Colorado Rapids, but lost 3–1. The first goal in the Timbers' MLS era was scored by Kenny Cooper. In their first season, the Portland Timbers finished in 6th place in the Western Conference and 12th place overall.

On July 9, 2012, John Spencer was fired after a 0–3 loss to Real Salt Lake. Gavin Wilkinson took over on an interim basis for the rest of the season. The Timbers finished 2012 with the third-worst record in the league and was 8th out of 9th in the Western Conference. They did, however, win the Cascadia Cup in MLS for the first time.

=== Caleb Porter era (2013–2017) ===
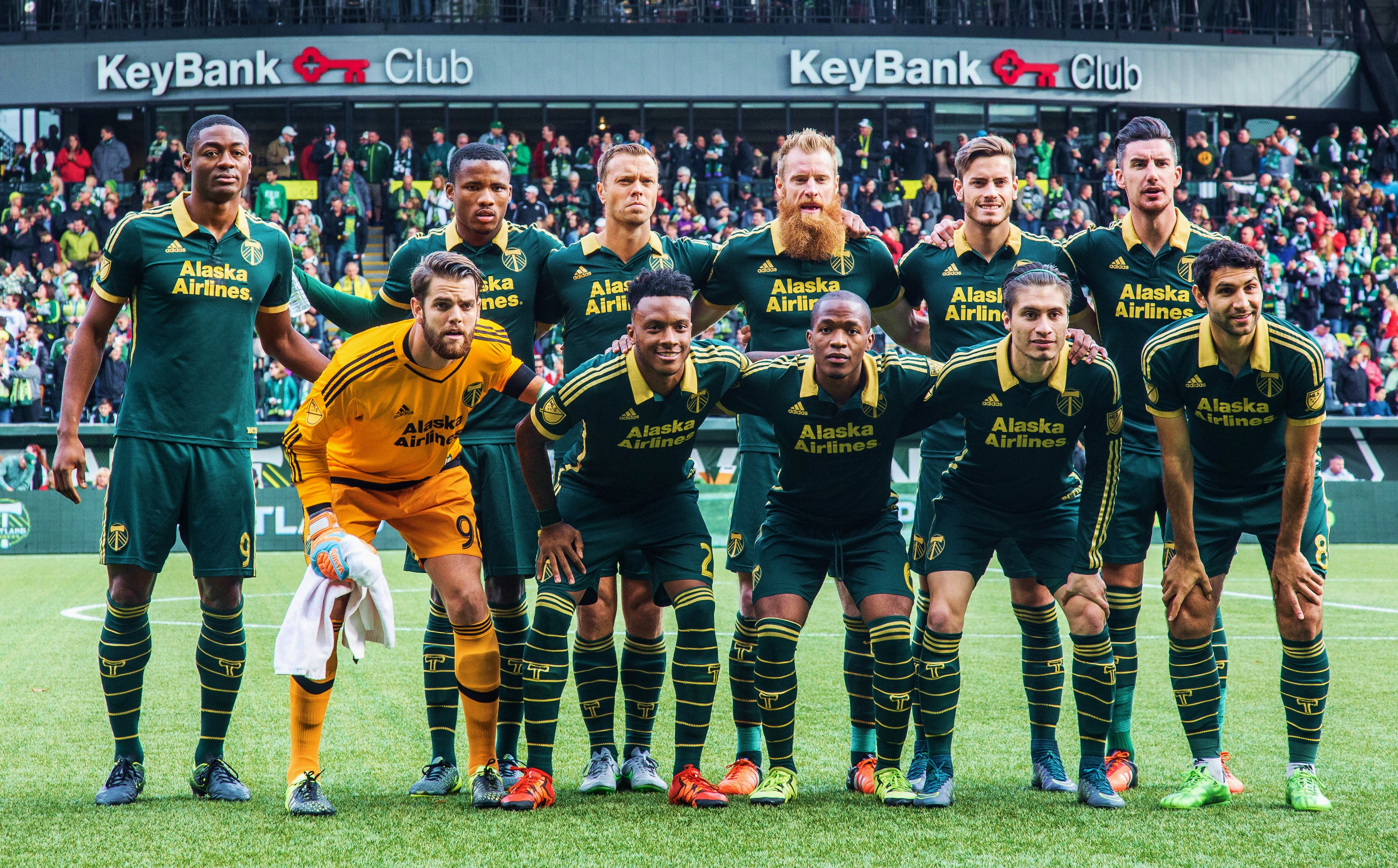
Portland Timbers in 2015

The 2013 season began with new head coach Caleb Porter, who was previously head coach of the United States U-23 team and the University of Akron Zips men's team from 2006 to 2012. Under Porter, the Timbers achieved immediate success in the 2013 MLS regular season. They finished in first place in the Western Conference and third place in MLS overall. An important player was Diego Valeri, whom the Timbers had acquired from Club Atlético Lanús on loan with an option to purchase (which they exercised later in the season). In the 2013 Lamar Hunt U.S. Open Cup tournament, the club reached the semifinals, where they were eliminated by Real Salt Lake. The Timbers also earned their first MLS playoff appearance in franchise history. They defeated their archrival Seattle Sounders FC in the conference semifinals 5–3 on aggregate. The Timbers were eliminated in the conference finals, again losing to Real Salt Lake in a two–game aggregate series (5–2 aggregate). Due to a change by the United States Soccer Federation of how American-based MLS teams can qualify in the CONCACAF Champions League, the Portland Timbers qualified for the 2014–15 CONCACAF Champions League, which was their first international tournament they would later take part in.

In the 2014 MLS season, the Timbers could not replicate the success they had in the previous season. They struggled defensively in the beginning of the season with a 1–3–6 (W-L-D) record over the first ten games. They were able to mount a comeback late in the season, still having a chance on the final weekend to appear in the MLS playoffs but ultimately failing to qualify. The Timbers finished the season in 6th place in the Western Conference, 11th place overall. For the 2014–15 CONCACAF Champions League, the Timbers were drawn with Club Deportivo Olimpia and Alpha United in the group stage of the tournament. They were eliminated in the group stage on away goals. During the offseason, Portland's main focus was to avoid a slow start as they did in the 2014 season, made more difficult with Diego Valeri and Will Johnson being unavailable for the first several weeks due to injuries suffered in the final games of the 2014 season. New acquisitions included Nat Borchers from Real Salt Lake and Ghanaian/Norwegian keeper Adam Larsen Kwarasey.

==== MLS Cup champions (2015) ====
The 2015 season, marked the franchise's fifth season as an MLS franchise, and the fortieth anniversary of the Timbers' legacy that traces back to the original North American Soccer League, which has been recognized by the team.

In 2015, the Timbers began their campaign without Diego Valeri and Will Johnson, who were still recovering from their injuries they obtained in the previous season. They would eventually return later in the season. The 2015 U.S. Open Cup pitted Portland against arch-rival Seattle in the fourth round of the tournament, where the Timbers eliminated the Sounders 3–1 in overtime. Seattle finished the match with only seven players after three were given red cards, including Clint Dempsey, who received his in dramatic fashion by tearing up the referee's notebook, and Obafemi Martins, who left the match with a groin injury. Portland would be defeated by Real Salt Lake in the fifth round. In a highly competitive Western Conference, the Timbers once again qualified for the MLS Playoffs, finishing strong in the final matches of the regular season which included a 5–2 win against LA Galaxy. Portland finished the regular season third in the Western Conference, fifth overall.

Portland played against Sporting Kansas City in the MLS playoffs' Knockout round that went to penalties after Sporting's Kevin Ellis scored a late tying goal in the final minutes of regulation ending in 1–1. Maxi Urruti scored late in overtime tying 2–2 after Sporting had the lead from a goal from Kristen Nemeth in the 97th minute. The penalty shootout to decide the game went 11 rounds, with Sporting's Saad Abdul-Salaam unbelievably missing a potential game winning kick off of both posts. Kwarasey scored the winning goal and made the winning save in the 11th round of penalties. The game has been since dubbed, "The Double Post". The Timbers advanced to defeat Vancouver Whitecaps FC in the second leg of their two-game series, winning the Conference Semifinals 2–0. Portland defeated FC Dallas in the Conference Final series 5–3 aggregate with a 3–1 win at home and tying 2–2 in the second match in Toyota Park, becoming Western Conference Champions and advancing to their first-ever MLS Cup appearance. The Timbers won the 2015 MLS Cup against Columbus Crew SC 2–1 from the fastest MLS Cup goal from Diego Valeri, followed by a header from Rodney Wallace in the first half. Despite conceding a goal from Columbus striker Kei Kamara, the Portland Timbers held on to win their first MLS Cup and in doing so became the first team in the Cascadia rivalry to win the championship.

==== Following seasons (2016–2017) ====
Portland's 2016 offseason consisted of transfers of key players including Jorge Villafaña, Will Johnson, Maxi Urruti, and Rodney Wallace. For the Timbers' 2016 campaign as defending champions, the season began with a win in a rematch against Columbus Crew SC. Portland's season in 2016 overall was described by head coach Caleb Porter as "A tale of two seasons." Although the team had a strong record at home, that performance was not reflected on the road, and the team dealt with injuries to key players throughout the season. The Timbers did not win a single match away from Providence Park in the season, finishing with a road record of 0–11–6 away from home and 12–14–8 (44 points) overall.

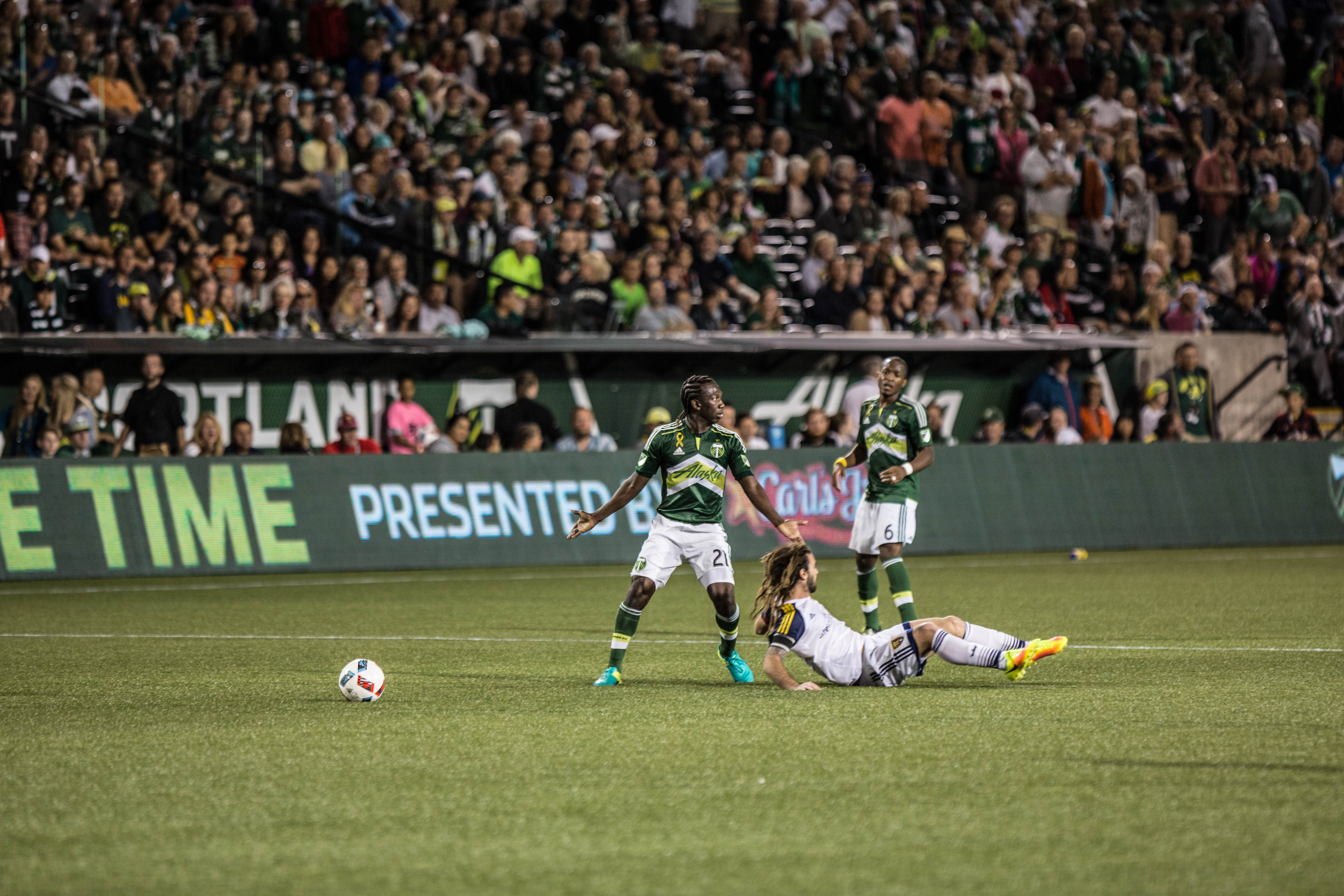
Diego Chará during a 2016 match against Real Salt Lake

In 2017, the team made it a priority to improve the team's defense, an issue the previous year, along with adding reinforcements in the midfield. Portland acquired Roy Miller and David Guzmán from C.D. Saprissa. Nat Borchers, who was injured in 2016, was not offered a new contract with the Timbers, and ultimately the veteran defender decided to retire. The Timbers also signed Sebastián Blanco, who had been a teammate of Valeri at Lanús, from San Lorenzo. Mid-season the Timbers also acquired center-back Larrys Mabiala from the Turkish club Kayserispor. In the second half of the season, midfielder Valeri scored in nine consecutive games, setting a new MLS record. Portland qualified for the playoffs once more in their second-to-last match of the regular season, a 4–0 rout of D.C. United at Providence Park. The Timbers finished the season in first place in the Western Conference, also winning the Cascadia Cup for the second time as an MLS team. Portland were eliminated by the Houston Dynamo in the Western Conference Semifinal. For the first time a Timbers player received MLS's Landon Donovan MVP award, given to Valeri for scoring 20+ goals and earning 10+ assists, among other accomplishments; it was the most goals ever scored by a midfielder in MLS.

In the off-season, Caleb Porter resigned as head coach on November 16, 2017, parting ways with the franchise.

=== Giovanni Savarese era (2018–2023) ===
On Dec 18, the Timbers officially announced former New York Cosmos head coach Giovanni Savarese as the team's new head coach, making him the third non-interim head coach for the Timbers since entering MLS. Despite starting their 2018 season without a win in their first five games, Savaraese and the Timbers finished their campaign strong, and would earn their second trip to the MLS Cup on December 8, 2018, where they would be defeated 2–0 by Atlanta United.

The 2019 season was overshadowed by the large renovation to Providence Park, which resulted in the addition of 4,000 seats on the east side of the stadium. The extensive construction meant that the Timbers played the first 12 matches of the season away from home. The team emerged from this extensive road trip with a marginal record of 4–6–2. Portland would largely fail to improve in their remaining home games. The Timbers finished the season with 49 points overall, which placed them 6th in the Western Conference. They went on to face Real Salt Lake in the 2019 playoffs in Salt Lake, which resulted in a 2–1 loss.

The Timbers began the 2020 Major League Soccer season with a loss at home against Minnesota United FC and a win against MLS expansion side Nashville SC. On March 12, 2020, the season then entered a lengthy suspension due to the COVID-19 pandemic in North America. On June 10, MLS announced that a bracket format dubbed the "MLS is Back Tournament" would begin July 8 at ESPN Wide World of Sports Complex in Walt Disney World, and end with the final on August 11.

Portland began the tournament drawn with LAFC, LA Galaxy, and the Houston Dynamo in Group F, which was dubbed the "Group of Death" by the media. The Timbers defeated Chicharito and the Galaxy 2–1 to open the tournament, downed Houston by the same score 5 days later, and then, assured of passage to the next round, came back to tie LAFC 2–2 while playing mostly their reserves to finish on top of the group.

In the Round of 16, Portland led FC Cincinnati before a late gaffe from goalkeeper Steve Clark forced the Timbers into a tie and penalty kicks. Cincinnati's players celebrated the equalizer by humorously mimicking a "parked bus" after defending for most of the match. Clark redeemed himself in the shootout and Portland won 1–1 (4–2) to advance to the next round of knockout games. In the Round of 8, Portland fell behind New York City FC after conceding an early goal but scored 3 in a row in the second half to cruise to an easy 3–1 win, which was capped off by a stunning outside-the-box strike from Andy Polo. Playing the Philadelphia Union next in the semifinals, the Timbers rose to the challenge with goals from Jeremy Ebobisse and Sebastián Blanco and held on to score a 2–1 victory and advance to the finals for the club's first title game appearance since the 2018 MLS Cup.

In the MLS is Back Tournament championship game against hometown Orlando City, Portland opened the scoring with a diving header from Larrys Mabiala off a pass from Diego Valeri in the 27th minute. Orlando equalized in the 39th minute, but Portland scored again in the 66th minute after defender Dario Župarić scored his first goal as a Timber, and Portland's defense held on to win 2–1, making the Portland Timbers under Savarese the MLS is Back Tournament champions.

On August 26, 2020, Portland Timbers players, as part of the 2020 American athlete strikes, voted to strike and not play their game against the San Jose Earthquakes that night. The game was then rescheduled to September 16.

In 2021, the Timbers finished fourth in the Western Conference, then upset top-seeded Colorado Rapids and staved off a hot underdog in Real Salt Lake en route to their third Cup final as an MLS club. For the first time since Soccer Bowl '77, Portland would host the championship of top-flight American soccer as the Timbers faced New York City FC in the final. After a 94th-minute goal from forward Felipe Mora that canceled out a first-half score from league top-scorer Valentín Castellanos, the Timbers and NYCFC finished extra time levelled at 1–1. The Timbers had two penalties saved in the shoot-out and lost the Cup after a 4–2 result, marking their second loss in MLS Cup finals.

==== Abuse scandal and fallout ====
In late September 2021, The Athletic published an investigation into North Carolina Courage head coach Paul Riley, alleging that Riley had sexually coerced and verbally abused players on his teams, including during his two-year tenure as Portland Thorns head coach in 2014 and 2015. More than a dozen players from every team Riley had coached since 2010 spoke to the publication and two named players, both former Thorns, went on the record with allegations against him. In the article, Riley denied the allegations. The investigation led to widespread fan discontent, focused primarily on the fact that Riley was both hired and fired by Timbers/Thorns owner Paulson and GM Wilkinson. Wilkinson was placed on administrative leave from the Thorns in early October, but retained his positions with the Timbers. (He was eventually replaced by Karina LeBlanc.)

Timbers attendance declined during the 2022 season as the team failed to sell out all but five games. The smaller crowds were attributed in part to the COVID-19 pandemic as well as discontent among fans over the club's handling of abuse allegations and other controversies. The organization was also accused of supporting a "toxic workplace environment" for women by several employees, particularly from upper management. In addition, the club terminated the contract of recently re-signed forward Andy Polo following allegations of domestic abuse from his ex-partner. However, during the season, the Timbers and Thorns hosted their first mixed-team charity match, PTFC for Peace, which raised over $600,000 for UNICEF's humanitarian relief efforts in Ukraine

The Yates Report, released on October 3, 2022, found further transgressions by members of the Timbers and Thorns organization, including alleged inappropriate conduct by president Mike Golub. The report and pressure from fans prompted Alaska Airlines, Tillamook, KeyBank, and other corporate sponsors to withhold, redirect, or cancel their financial contributions to the club. Paulson announced he, along with general manager Gavin Wilkinson (who was extended prior to the season) and Golub, would step away from the Thorns. On October 5, 2022, Wilkinson and Golub were fired from the club altogether. Ned Grabavoy handled Timbers front office duties in the interim.

On the pitch, the Timbers would lose the last game of the season against Real Salt Lake, knocking them out of playoff contention and lifting RSL in their place by one point. After a strong showing in the newly expanded 2023 Leagues Cup, where they played well against two top-level Liga MX teams, the Timbers fired Giovanni Savarese midway through the 2023 season following a 5–0 road loss to the Houston Dynamo. Savarese, the winningest coach in the club's MLS history to date, had led Portland to two MLS Cup finals (2018, 2021) and secured the MLS is Back Tournament title in 2020. At the time of his departure, the Timbers were 12th in the Western Conference with a 6-10-8 record. Following his dismissal, assistant coach Miles Joseph was appointed as interim head coach for the remainder of the season. After narrowly missing with Miles, the playoffs yet again, the club would go on to hire Phil Neville as coach the next season, on November 3, 2023, which brought ire from fans due to past sexist comments on social media.

=== Phil Neville era (2024−2026) ===
The Timbers started their 2024 season with a 4−1 defeat of the Colorado Rapids and a new shirt sponsor in the roofing company DaBella. The shirt sponsorship was canceled on February 28 due to sexual harassment allegations against the company's owner, which had further implications due to the strained relations the club had achieved with fans in the wake of the NWSL fallout (the Thorns were sold in the 2023 offseason). Ultimately, Tillamook would become the replacement sponsor. For the second time in MLS era history, the Timbers and Thorns played a co-ed charity match at Providence Park, the Green is Gold Charity Match, raising around $100,000 for the environmental nonprofits The Nature Conservancy and Keep Oregon Green.

The Timbers' attack shone through an otherwise difficult season for the club, as Brazilian attacker Evander and Uruguayan forward Jonathan Rodriguez, and Chilean forward Felipe Mora combined for 45 of the side's 65 total MLS goals. The team itself finished ninth in the Western Conference, good enough to make a play-in game in the 2024 MLS Cup playoffs. Hosted at Providence Park due to scheduling conflicts at eighth-seed Vancouver Whitecaps' BC Place, the Timbers would fall decisively to Vancouver, 5−0. In the 2024−25 offseason, amidst public discontent from Evander regarding Timbers management, the club sold their star attacker and MLS Best XI honoree to FC Cincinnati, utilizing the new MLS intra-league transfer method, for $12 million.

The Timbers would end their 2025 season in eighth place and back in the Western Conference play-in spot, with the punctuation mark being a 4−0 home loss to expansion side San Diego FC on the last day of the season.

The 2026 season started in disappointing fashion, culminating in a May 23 1-3 home loss to San Jose, in which the Timbers Army called for Phil Neville to be fired. On May 25, it was announced Phil Neville had parted ways with the Timbers by mutual consent. The Timbers had accumulated 14 points from their first 14 games.

Jack Cassidy, the Timbers2 coach, was named interim head coach on June 5, 2026, after Neville's departure. Cassidy's first game as head coach was against the Seattle Sounders and ended with a statement victory over their rivals, a 5-1 win that marked Portland's largest margin of victory in the clubs' head-to-head series during the MLS era. His final match as Timbers head coach came against Club América in the Leagues Cup on August 9, 2026, ending in a defeat. The loss was his only defeat during his tenure with the Timbers, which also included an undefeated regular-season record and two victories over the club’s rivals, the Seattle Sounders.

=== The Martí Cifuentes era (2026−Present) ===
The Timbers hired Martí Cifuentes on July 21, while Jack Cassidy continued to serve as interim coach until his arrival. Cifuentes' first match in charge took place August 13, as the Timbers defeated Liga MX opponent Club Tijuana in Leagues Cup play.

== Colors and badge ==
The Portland Timbers' MLS logo incorporates elements of the former USL design. The primary reference to the original crest is the circular shape that represents unity, wholeness, and the pursuit of perfection. The axe pays homage to the Pacific Northwest's logging industry, as loggers traditionally used axes to cut down trees. There are three chevrons organized to resemble a pine tree that refer to the Timbers' membership in three separate leagues: the original North American Soccer League, the United Soccer Leagues, and Major League Soccer. The team's colors, ponderosa green and moss green, represent the state of Oregon's forests.

=== Sponsors ===
Period	Kit manufacturer	Shirt sponsor	Right sleeve sponsor	Left sleeve sponsor
2011–2020	Adidas	Alaska Airlines	—	—
2021–2023	Adidas	Alaska Airlines	TikTok	—
2024	Adidas	DaBella	TikTok	Apple TV
2024–2025	Adidas	Tillamook	—	Apple TV
2026–present	Adidas	Bank of America	Tillamook	Apple TV

It was announced in September 2010 that the Portland Timbers' jerseys would be sponsored by Alaska Airlines. On December 9, 2010, the jersey was revealed at a runway show at Portland International Airport. The home jersey was a two-tone halved green shirt, while the alternate jersey was red in honor of Portland being known as the Rose City.

On February 23, 2021, it was announced that Portland had made a deal with TikTok, as team's sleeve sponsor beginning in the same year. Part of the deal included collaborative work for the company's 'TikTok for Good' campaign. Alaska withdrew their sponsorship at the conclusion of the 2023 season, a year after it donated a portion of its financial contributions to the NWSLPA in response to allegations of abuse within the Thorns organization. They were replaced in November 2023 by DaBella, an Oregon-based home renovations contractor with 46 locations. The sponsorship was terminated one game into the regular season by the Timbers on February 28, 2024, after DaBella CEO Donnie McMillan Jr. was accused of sexual harassment. Beginning with the launch of MLS Season Pass in 2023, the Timbers began featuring their first left sleeve jersey sponsor, Apple TV+.

Midway through the 2024 season, on May 12, 2024, the Timbers announced a multi-year deal with the Tillamook County Creamery Association as their new front of jersey sponsor. For the 2025 MLS season, Apple created custom-designed Apple TV patches for the left sleeves of all clubs' kits, with the Timbers' patch featuring green and gold. The right sleeve spot is became vacant at the start of the 2025 season, with the long-term TikTok deal having ended at the conclusion of the 2024 season. On December 9, 2025, the Timbers announced that their new primary sponsor will be Bank of America beginning in the 2026 season, replacing the previous sponsor Tillamook, which will move to the front right sleeve.

=== Uniform evolution ===
Home, away, and alternative uniforms.

- Home

2011–12	2013–14	2015–16	2017–18	2019–20	2021–22	2023–24	2024–

- Away

2011–12	2013	2014–15	2016–17	2018–19	2020–21	2022–23	2024–25	2026–

- Alternate

2012–13	2014–15	2024

== Stadium ==
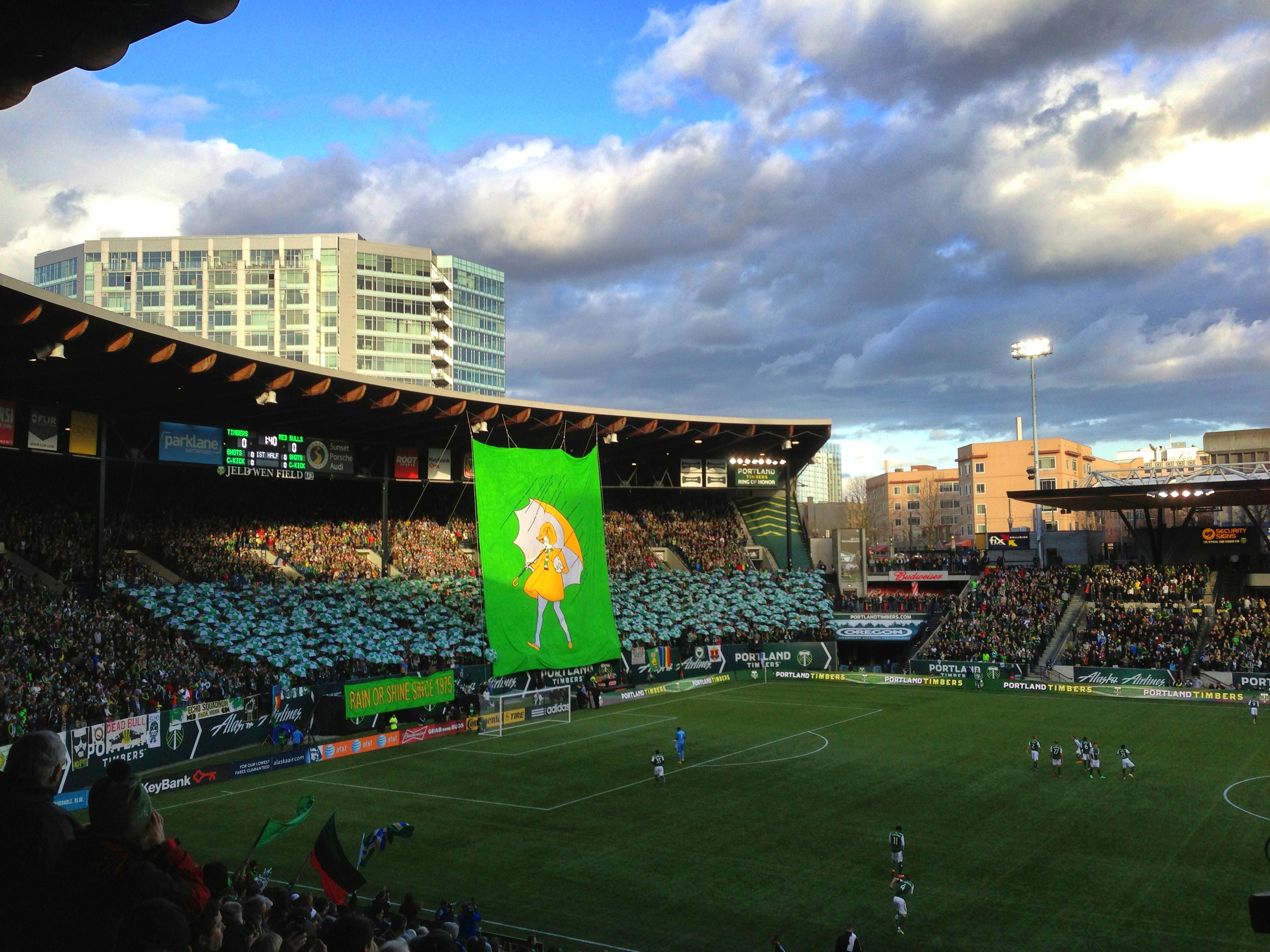
Jeld-Wen Field 2013 season opener

- Providence Park; Portland, Oregon (2011–present)

The Timbers play at Providence Park in downtown Portland, which they share with the Portland Thorns of the National Women's Soccer League. Before joining MLS, the Timbers played at PGE Park, which was renamed Jeld-Wen Field in 2011 for the inaugural MLS season, and later became Providence Park in 2014. What is now known as Providence Park has existed in Portland since 1893 and as a complete stadium since 1926, when it was constructed by the nearby Multnomah Athletic Club, which still borders the stadium on the southern end. Providence Park is the oldest soccer-specific stadium in Major League Soccer and one of the most historic grounds used by any United States professional soccer team.

The stadium has played host to many watershed moments in United States soccer history, including the Soccer Bowl '77, the 1999 and 2003 FIFA Women's World Cups, the 2013 CONCACAF Gold Cup, the 2014 MLS All-Star Game, the 2015 NWSL Championship Game, and MLS Cup 2021. Providence Park has been the home of the Portland Timbers in all of their iterations since 1975.

In July 2009, the Portland City Council approved a $31 million renovation to make the stadium ready for the 2011 Major League Soccer season, reconfiguring the grounds primarily for men and women's soccer. Operational capacity was 18,627 for the 2011 MLS season and expanded to 20,323 for the 2012 season.

On February 10, 2014, the Timbers signed a long-term stadium naming rights sponsorship with Providence Health & Services, a non-profit health care provider. The stadium will be known as Providence Park until at least 2028.

In December 2017, the Portland City Council approved for construction a US$85 million expansion project to increase seating capacity for Providence Park. The project, whose terms were already approved in June of the same year, added an additional 4,000 seats to the near 22,000 seats already built, increasing overall capacity by 20%. The stadium plan was in the works for several seasons as the Timbers had a season ticket waitlist of approximately 13,000.

The new remade steel stand was inspired by the legendary Boca Juniors' stadium La Bombonera as well as the classic raised stage of Shakespeare's Globe Theatre, creating a unique layered appearance that also paid homage to the original, unfinished 1926 Multnomah Field plans. Spelled out across the green seats on the East End in white lettering is "SC USA", a direct nod to Portland's history as "Soccer City USA".

The expanded Providence Park opened for the first time on July 1, 2019, as the Timbers hosted LAFC, selling out the capacity of 25,218. The expansion gave Providence Park the 4th-highest seating capacity of any soccer-specific stadium in MLS. Included in the renovation were the addition of three decks of new seats, two new video boards and a modern edge-to-edge roof, as well as updated LED lighting throughout the park.

Years	Capacity
2011	18,627
2012	20,323
2013–2018	21,144
2019–present	25,218

== Club culture ==
=== Supporters ===
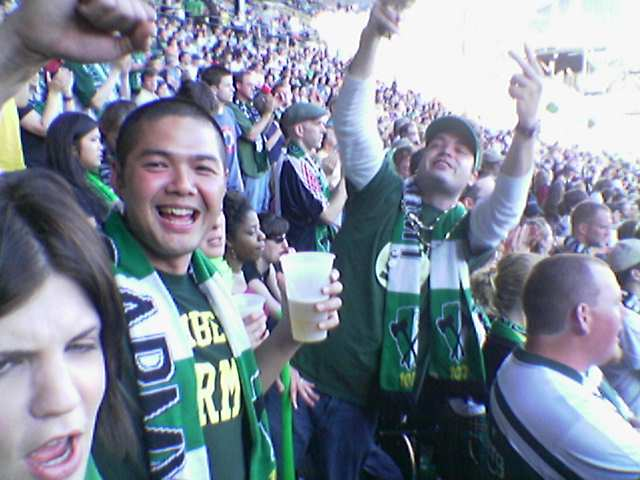
Portland Timbers fans

The Timbers sold out every home game from their transition to MLS in 2011 until the pandemic of 2020–2021, a league-record streak of 163 games. The Timbers cap season-ticket sales at 15,300, and at one point had a waitlist of 10,000 season tickets, larger than almost every college football team.

The main supporters group of the Portland Timbers is the Timbers Army. Its members are known for their loud, enthusiastic support and the raucous atmosphere they create at Timbers games, as well as their leftist political positions. The Timbers Army is consistently referred to by American media as one of the best, or very best, supporting groups in the country, with Timbers fans often given the same distinction.

The Timbers Army was founded in 2001 as the Cascade Rangers, a reference to the Cascade Range of mountains in the Pacific Northwest region of North America. The group began congregating in section 107 ("The Woodshed") of PGE Park ("The Piggy") to create a European-style rooting section for the club, complete with drumming, flags, scarves, smoke bombs and constant chanting and cheering. By 2002, the group had changed its name to the Timbers Army in order to lose any perception of partiality toward Scottish soccer club Rangers and because the Timbers uniforms at the time resembled those of Rangers rival Celtic. By 2012, the Timbers Army numbered more than 4,000 people in the north-end on match day.

Supporters often organized outside of match days, meeting through the Soccer City USA message board. Here fans discussed the club and its future during the USL era. Many supporters also contributed to the "MLS to Portland" website, which supported the broader idea of moving the club to MLS. These efforts eventually led to the formation of the 107ist, a structured supporters' group with a democratically elected board to function as a liaison for the fans to the club. The 107ist manages supporter activities and provides a framework for fan involvement in club-led initiatives.

In 2019, the Timbers Army made national news as they clashed with the MLS front office over the use of the Iron Front symbol on flags flown by Timbers supporters. MLS banned the anti-fascist symbol along with far-right regalia in a blanket ban of "political signage", which the Army contested, arguing in a statement that opposition to fascism, racism, and sexism was not political. A protracted public battle between the Army and MLS brass occurred, culminating in a protest during the August game against Seattle where the TA deliberately stayed silent for the first 33 minutes of the nationally televised clash to commemorate 1933, the year that the Iron Front was disbanded in Nazi Germany.

After the protests by the Timbers Army gained media exposure, Major League Soccer officials announced they would meet with the Army and other supporter groups around the league. A month later, on September 24, 2019, the league announced it would be reversing the policy that prohibited the Iron Front, allowing Timbers supporters to use the symbol again. This was a rare instance in American sports (and one of the first in MLS) that a supporter group had directly taken on the league with an organized response and forced a change in policy.

=== Rivalries ===
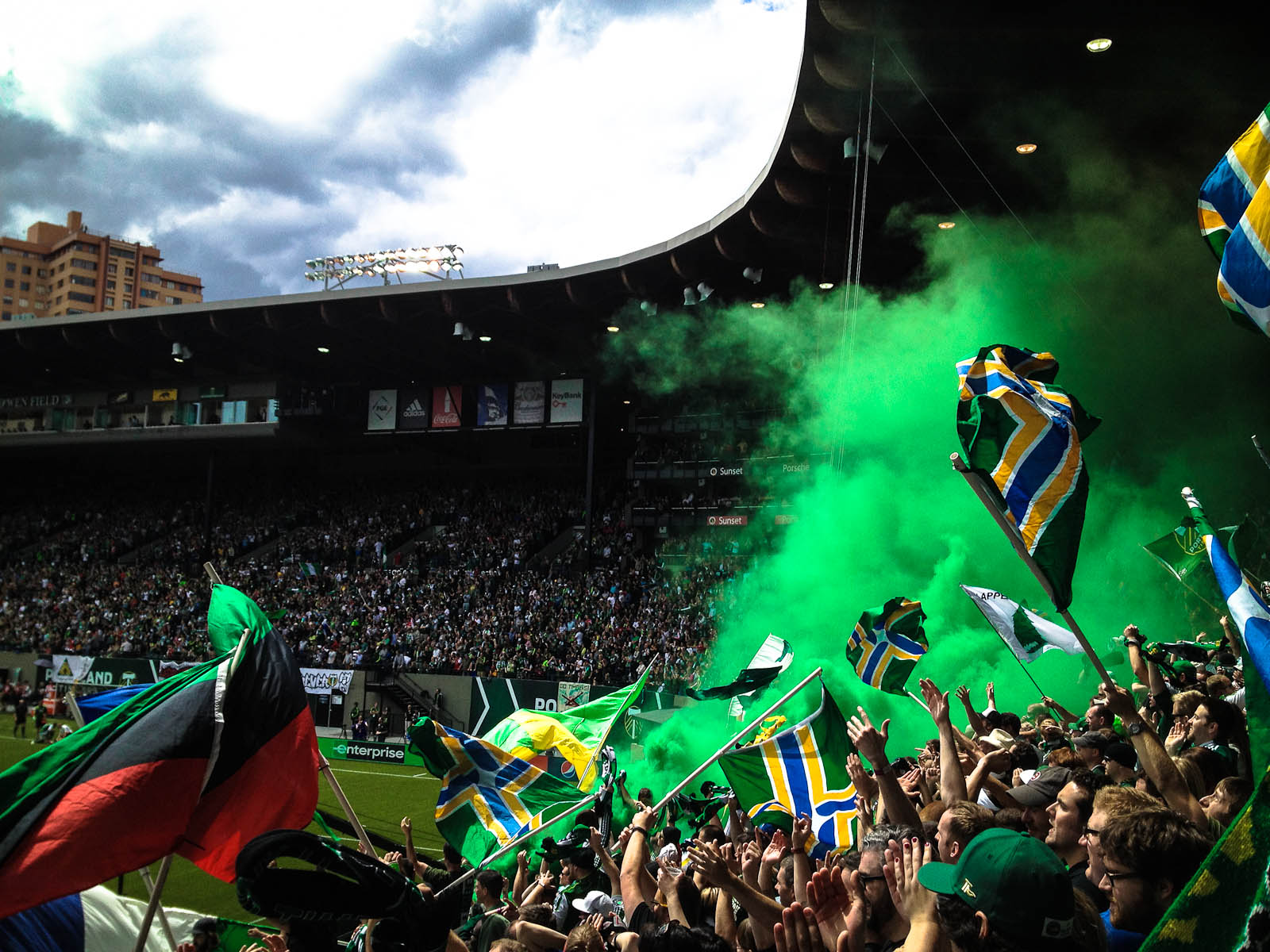
Timbers Army smoke bombs

The Cascadia Cup is a trophy and competition between the three soccer clubs of the Cascadia bioregion: the Timbers, Seattle Sounders FC, and Vancouver Whitecaps FC. Portland was the third and final addition to what later came to be known as the Cascadia rivalry when it entered the NASL in 1975, following Seattle and Vancouver who had both begun competing in 1974. The three clubs' rivalry in the original NASL during the 1970s continued into the USL from 2001 to 2008, and followed into the modern-day MLS rivalry.

In 2004 supporters of the three clubs created the Cascadia Cup, a yearly trophy handed out to the club with the best overall head-to-head record between the Pacific Northwest three. The Cup moved to MLS in 2011 as all three clubs again played together in the same league. Portland has won the Cup six times: in 2009, 2010, 2012, 2017, 2022, and 2024.

Portland became the first team in Cascadia to win the MLS Cup, doing so in 2015.

==== Seattle Sounders ====
The Portland Timbers have a long-running rivalry with Seattle Sounders FC dating to the original North American Soccer League, as far back as 1975. Natural regional rivals from 1975 to 1982 in the North American Soccer League and from 2001 to 2008 in the USL First Division, the Portland Timbers–Seattle Sounders rivalry was continued after Portland entered MLS as an expansion team in 2011.

With the close proximity of the two cities, traveling fans of both sides witness hostile environments while visiting the opposing stadium. According to many players, the Seattle–Portland rivalry is one of the only true derbies that is present in American soccer. The rivalry has been cited by multiple sources as one of the most intense rivalries in not just MLS but North American soccer.

The Seattle-Portland rivalry rose to higher levels when they faced each other in the 2013 MLS playoffs in their two-game series where the Timbers eliminated their arch-rivals in their first-ever MLS postseason matchup. Portland faced the higher-seeded Seattle in the 2018 Western Conference Semifinals in another two-game series, forcing the Sounders into a dramatic tie on aggregate in extra time in their home stadium and subsequently advancing to the Conference Finals on penalty kicks.

While to date, Portland has never lost to Seattle in the MLS Playoffs, they have lost several times to the Sounders in US Open Cup play with Seattle defeating them 3 times on the way to title victories.

==== Vancouver Whitecaps ====
Vancouver Whitecaps FC, the other Cascadian team in the tri-rivalry from the NASL and USL, moved to MLS along with Portland in 2011. They compete along with Portland and Seattle in the Cascadia Cup. Portland and Vancouver's historic rivalry dates back to 1975 in the original North American Soccer League.

Compared to Portland-Seattle, Portland-Vancouver is considered "friendlier" on both the pitch and the stands. Members of the supporting groups between the two clubs even jointly celebrated together after Vancouver eliminated Portland from the 2010 USL Playoffs due to the shared move to MLS the next year. One reason for the less-intense rivalry for the time being could be simple geography (Portland is closer to Seattle than Vancouver) or Vancouver not attaining a similar level of sustained MLS success as the two other Cascadia clubs.

Many Whitecap players point to the Timbers as being their biggest rival, even while Vancouver has off-and-on rivalries with other Canadian teams. As of 2020, Portland holds a 12–7–7 W-D-L advantage over Vancouver in MLS play.

During the Timbers' 2015 MLS Cup run, they defeated Vancouver 2–0 on aggregate over a two-game series in the Western Conference semifinals.

==== Other teams ====
Portland fans in all sports have traditionally embraced a hatred of Los Angeles teams, and that has been no different in recent years in MLS play. Portland had a testy matchup with LAFC in the 2018 US Open Cup and followed it up the next year with an even more physical battle in the first game at the revamped Providence Park, leading MLS writer Brian Taylor to describe the matchup as a "new rivalry". In January 2020, Timbers midfielder Sebastian Blanco said that LAFC was Portland's biggest rival outside of Cascadia, and that he "loves to play those games" against them and the LA Galaxy. In the 2020 MLS is Back Tournament, Portland drew both LAFC and LA Galaxy in the initial group stage, where they defeated the Galaxy and came from behind to tie against LAFC en route to finishing on top of the group and winning the trophy.

=== Mascot ===
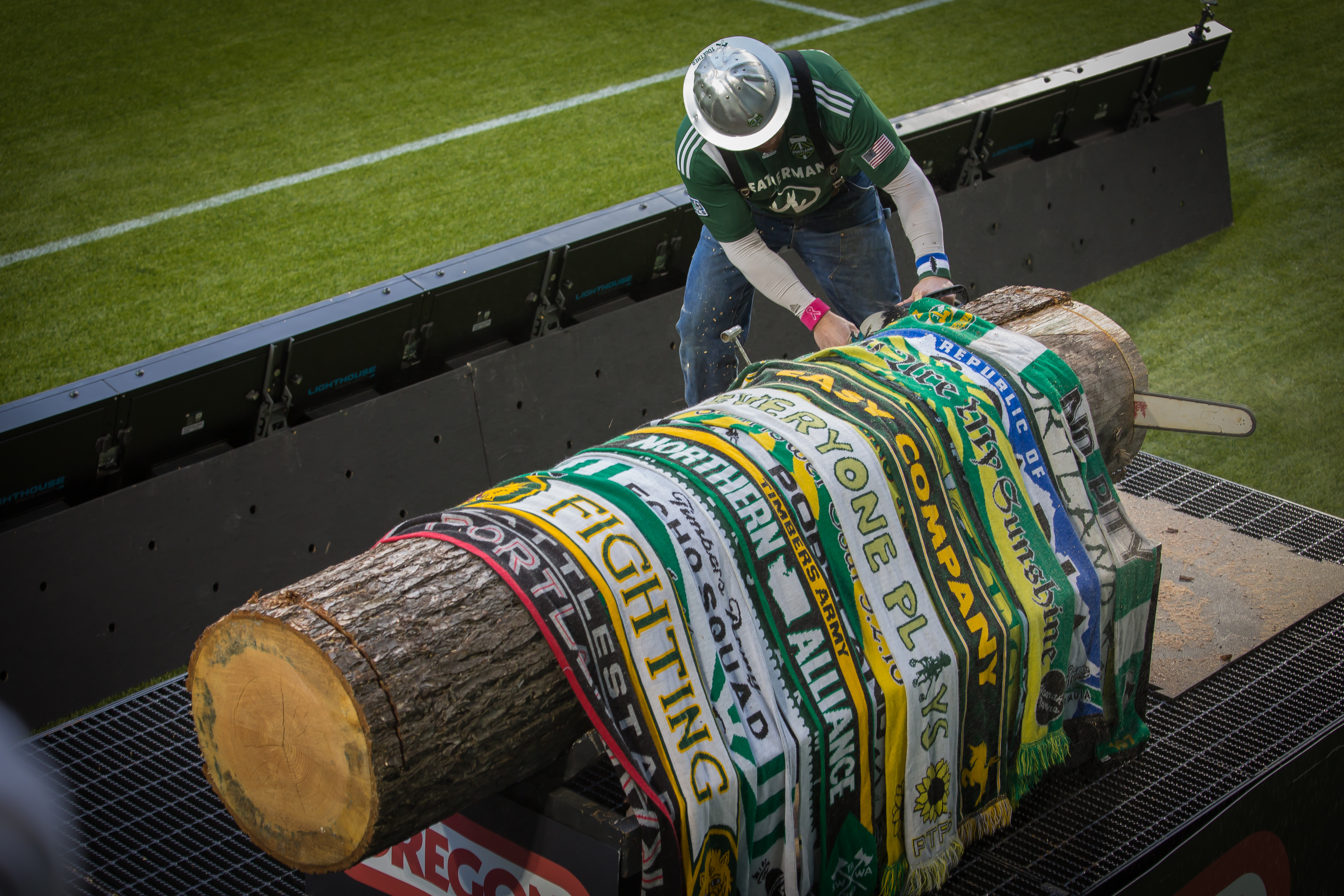
Timber Joey cutting the first Goal Slice of the 2013 season

During the NASL and USL years the team's mascot was a grizzled lumberjack named Timber Jim. On January 24, 2008, Jim announced his retirement. His final farewell was a game played against Puerto Rico Islanders on April 17, 2008, which the Timbers won 1–0.

Timber Joey served as the unofficial mascot from then on, and was inaugurated as the new official mascot at an exhibition game vs Juventus Primavera on June 14, 2008, a game the Timbers won 1–0, and has served in that capacity ever since, leading into their MLS inauguration in 2011. Joey continues Jim's trademark of cutting a round (or "cookie") from a large log with a chainsaw every time the Timbers score a goal. This round is presented to the goal-scoring player after the game. If the team achieves a shutout (clean sheet), the goalkeeper also receives a round. Timber Joey has his own custom jersey with Portland-based outdoor tool manufacturer Leatherman as the shirt sponsor.

== Broadcasting ==
From 2023, every Timbers match is available to stream via MLS Season Pass on the Apple TV app. Prior to Apple, the Timbers were a regular staple on local television in the Portland area, both cable and over-the-air.

Before 2023, regular-season games not televised by Major League Soccer's national television partners were broadcast by Root Sports Northwest. Selected games were broadcast in English by Fox affiliate KPTV (channel 12) or its co-owned MyNetworkTV affiliate KPDX (channel 49). It was formerly broadcast in Spanish by Estrella TV affiliate KGW-DT3 (channel 8.3) from its inception until 2018 when the station ended its affiliation on the subchannel. Beginning in 2012, the team launched a regional syndication network, the Portland Timbers Broadcast Network, which provides the Timbers' over-the-air game coverage to additional markets. Partners of the network included the second digital subchannel of NBC affiliate KTVZ (channel 21.2) in Bend, Fox affiliate KEVU (channel 23) in Eugene and MyNetworkTV affiliate KFBI-LD (channel 48) in Medford. KPTV also airs a weekly highlight show, Timbers in 30, on Friday evenings; any future Timbers content remains unaffected by the 2023 Apple deal and teams will still be allowed to have local TV partners.

On the radio, all Timbers games are broadcast in English on KXTG (750 AM, "The Game") and are simulcast in Spanish on KXET (1150 AM and 93.FM, "La Gran D"). KXTG also airs Talk Timbers, a weekly radio show dedicated to the team and soccer.

== Roster and staff ==
For details on former players, see All-time Portland Timbers roster.

=== Current roster ===
As of September 26, 2026

Note: Flags indicate national team as defined under FIFA eligibility rules; some limited exceptions apply. Players may hold more than one non-FIFA nationality.

No.	Pos.	Nation	Player
2	DF	CAN	Joel Waterman
4	DF	CAN	Kamal Miller
5	DF	USA	Brandon Bye
6	DF	AUS	Alex Bonetig
7	FW	CRC	Ariel Lassiter
10	MF	POR	David Da Costa
11	FW	BRA	Antony
12	DF	VEN	Ronald Hernández
14	FW	NED	Vincent Janssen
15	DF	USA	Eric Miller
16	DF	USA	Sawyer Jura
17	MF	USA	Cole Bassett
18	DF	CAN	Zac McGraw
20	DF	NZL	Finn Surman

No.	Pos.	Nation	Player
21	MF	COL	Diego Chará (captain)
22	MF	USA	Omir Fernández
23	DF	USA	Ian Smith
25	GK	USA	Trey Muse
26	GK	USA	Hunter Sulte
27	DF	COL	Jimer Fory
28	FW	CHI	Alexander Aravena (on loan from Grêmio)
29	DF	COL	Juan David Mosquera
30	MF	COL	José Caicedo
41	GK	CAN	James Pantemis
73	MF	USA	Eric Izoita
80	MF	ECU	Joao Ortiz
88	FW	USA	Gage Guerra
99	FW	NOR	Kristoffer Velde

=== Retired numbers ===
No.	Player	Position	Nation	Tenure	No. ret.	Ref.
3	Clive Charles	Defender	United States	1978–1981	2003	

=== Coaching and technical staff ===
Title	Name
Head Coach	Martí Cifuentes
Technical Director	Jack Dodd
Assistant Coach	Liam Ridgewell
Assistant Coach	Shannon Murray
Assistant Coach	Dave van den Bergh
Goalkeeping Coach	Guillermo Valencia
Head of Health and Performance	Nick Milonas
Director of Scouting	Nacho Leblic
Head Video Analyst	Connor Ceballos

=== Executive staff ===
Title	Name
Owner	Merritt Paulson
CEO	Heather Davis
Chief Administrative Officer / Chief Financial Officer	Sarah Keane
Chief Operations Officer	Ashley Highsmith
Chief Revenue Officer	Joe Cote
Chief Communications Officer	Collin Romer

Source: Portland Timbers

=== Head coach history ===
Name	Nat	Tenure
John Spencer	Scotland	December 1, 2010 – July 9, 2012
Gavin Wilkinson	New Zealand	July 9, 2012 – October 28, 2012 (interim)
Caleb Porter	United States	January 8, 2013 – November 17, 2017
Giovanni Savarese	Venezuela	December 18, 2017 – August 21, 2023
Miles Joseph	United States	August 21, 2023 – November 6, 2023 (interim)
Phil Neville	England	November 6, 2023 – May 25, 2026
Jack Cassidy	Ireland	June 5, 2026 – August 11, 2026 (interim)
Martí Cifuentes	Spain	August 11, 2026 – present

=== General manager history ===
Name	Nat	Tenure
Gavin Wilkinson	New Zealand	2009–2022
Ned Grabavoy	United States	2023–present

=== Club captain history ===
Name	Nat	Tenure
Jack Jewsbury	United States	2011–2013
Will Johnson	Canada	2013–2015
Liam Ridgewell	England	2015–2018
Diego Valeri	Argentina	2018–2021
Diego Chará	Colombia	2022–present

=== Ring of Honor ===
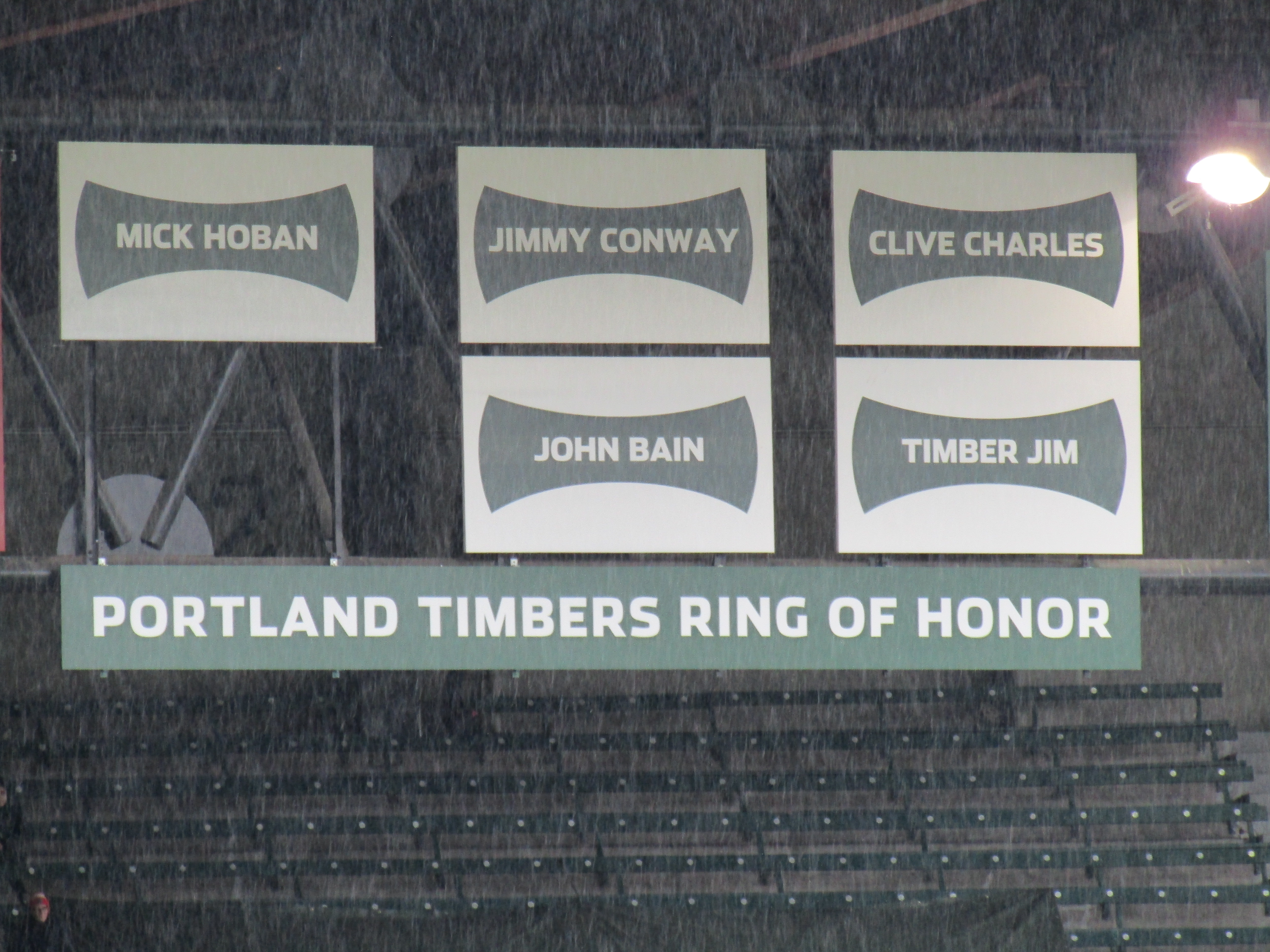
The Ring of Honor as it appeared in 2018

Given to those involved with the Portland Timbers deserving of special honors. Currently there are only six members of this exclusive group:

Inductee	Date of induction
Clive Charles	August 29, 2003
Timber Jim	April 17, 2008
John Bain	March 19, 2011
Jimmy Conway	March 19, 2011
Mick Hoban	March 8, 2014
Diego Valeri	July 15, 2023

Those inducted have their names displayed in the upper northeast corner of what is now Providence Park. Clive Charles' number was retired in a halftime ceremony on August 29, 2003, just three days after his death. Timber Jim's number was retired in a halftime ceremony on April 17, 2008. Timber Jim is currently the only non-player to be inducted to the Ring of Honor. Both John Bain and Jimmy Conway were unveiled as new members at halftime of the club's first ever MLS home game on March 19, 2011. Mick Hoban was inducted on during a halftime ceremony on March 8, 2014. Diego Valeri is the first MLS-era player to be inducted into the Timbers Ring of Honor, which took place on July 15, 2023, during a match against Columbus Crew SC at Providence Park.

== Honors ==
=== Domestic ===
- MLS Cup
  - Champions (1): 2015
  - Runners-up (2): 2018, 2021
- Western Conference (Playoff)
  - Champions (3): 2015, 2018, 2021
  - Runners-up (1): 2013
- Western Conference (Regular Season)
  - Champions (2): 2013, 2017
- MLS is Back Tournament
  - Champions (1): 2020
- USL A-League/USL-1 Commissioner's Cup
  - Champions (2): 2004, 2009
  - Runners-up (1): 2007
- USL A-League Western Conference (Regular Season)
  - Champions (1): 2004

=== Awards ===
- MLS Fair Play Award: 2011

== Portland Timbers 2 (T2) ==
Portland Timbers 2 (T2) is the farm club of the Portland Timbers. In October 2014, Merritt Paulson announced the creation of their USL Pro team, Portland Timbers 2 (T2). T2 began play in the 2015 USL pro season, having Merlo Field as their stadium to play for their home games. The purpose of T2 is to bridge a gap between the academies and the first level team, while having a better way to observe the players' progress and development as well.

== Records ==
=== Year-by-year ===
This is a partial list of the last five seasons completed by the Timbers. For the full season-by-season history, see List of Portland Timbers seasons.

Season	League											Position		Playoffs	USOC	Continental / Other		Average attendance	Top goalscorer(s)	
Season	Div	League	Pld	W	L	D	GF	GA	GD	Pts	PPG	Conf.	Overall	Playoffs	USOC	Continental / Other		Average attendance	Player(s)	Goals
**2021**	1	MLS	34	17	13	4	56	52	4	55	1.62	4th	5th	RU	NH	CONCACAF Champions League	QF	21,285	(Chile) Felipe Mora	15
**2022**	1	MLS	34	11	10	13	53	53	0	46	1.35	8th	15th	DNQ	Ro32	DNQ		23,341	(Colombia) Dairon Asprilla	10
**2023**	1	MLS	34	11	13	10	46	58	−12	43	1.26	10th	18th	DNQ	Ro32	Leagues Cup	Ro32	23,103	(Brazil) Evander	11
**2024**	1	MLS	34	12	11	11	65	56	+9	47	1.38	9th	15th	PR	DNE	Leagues Cup	Ro32	22,485	(Uruguay) Jonathan Rodríguez	16
**2025**	1	MLS	34	11	12	11	41	48	−7	44	1.29	8th	17th	R1	Ro16	Leagues Cup	LP	25,218	(Venezuela) Kevin Kelsy	9

1. Average attendance include statistics from league matches only.
2. Top goalscorer(s) includes all goals scored in League, MLS Cup playoffs, U.S. Open Cup, MLS is Back Tournament, CONCACAF Champions Cup, Leagues Cup, FIFA Club World Cup, and other competitive continental matches.

=== Attendance by season ===
All regular-season home games since the Timbers' entry into MLS in 2011 until the COVID-19 pandemic in 2020 had been sold out, with the 100th such sell-out on September 10, 2016.

MLS Season	Reg. season	MLS playoffs
2011	18,827	DNQ
2012	20,438	DNQ
2013	20,674	20,674
2014	20,744	DNQ
2015	21,144	21,144
2016	21,144	DNQ
2017	21,144	21,144
2018	21,144	21,144
2019	25,218	N/A
2020	25,218 (Note: Excluding matches played behind closed doors due to the COVID-19 pandemic.)	N/A (Note: All playoff matches were behind closed doors due to the COVID-19 pandemic.)
2021	21,284	23,876
2022	23,841	DNQ
2023	23,103	DNQ
2024	22,054	19,143
2025	22,134	17,752

DNQ = Did not qualify

=== Top scorer by season ===
Season	Player(s)	Nation(s)	Goals
2011	Kenny Cooper Jack Jewsbury	United States	8
2012	Kris Boyd	Scotland	7
2013	Diego Valeri	Argentina	13
2014	Diego Valeri	Argentina	11
2015	Fanendo Adi	Nigeria	18
2016	Fanendo Adi	Nigeria	18
2017	Diego Valeri	Argentina	21
2018	Sebastián Blanco Diego Valeri	Argentina	14
2019	Brian Fernández	Argentina	15
2020	Jeremy Ebobisse Diego Valeri	United States Argentina	9
2021	Felipe Mora	Chile	15
2022	Dairon Asprilla	Colombia	10
2023	Evander	Brazil	11
2024	Jonathan Rodríguez	Uruguay	16
2025	Kevin Kelsy	Venezuela	9

=== CONCACAF Champions League ===
Portland has qualified for the CONCACAF Champions League three times, the first time being the 2014–15 edition of the tournament.

Scores and results list Portland's goal tally first.

Season	Round	Opponent	Home	Away	Aggregate
2014–15	Group stage	(Guyana) Alpha United	6–0	4–1	2nd
2014–15	Group stage	(Honduras) Olimpia	4–2	1–3	2nd
2016–17	Group stage	(El Salvador) Dragón	2–1	2–1	2nd
2016–17	Group stage	(Costa Rica) Saprissa	1–1	2–4	2nd
2021	Round of 16	(Honduras) Marathón	2–2	5–0	7–2
2021	Quarter-finals	(Mexico) América	1–1	1–3	2–4

==== Table ====
Season	Round	Position	Pld	W	D	L	GF	GA
2014–15	Group stage	9th of 24	4	3	0	1	15	6
2016–17	Group stage	10th of 24	4	2	1	1	7	7
2021	Quarter-finals	7th of 16	4	1	2	1	9	6
Totals			12	6	3	3	31	19

=== Player statistics ===
==== Matches ====
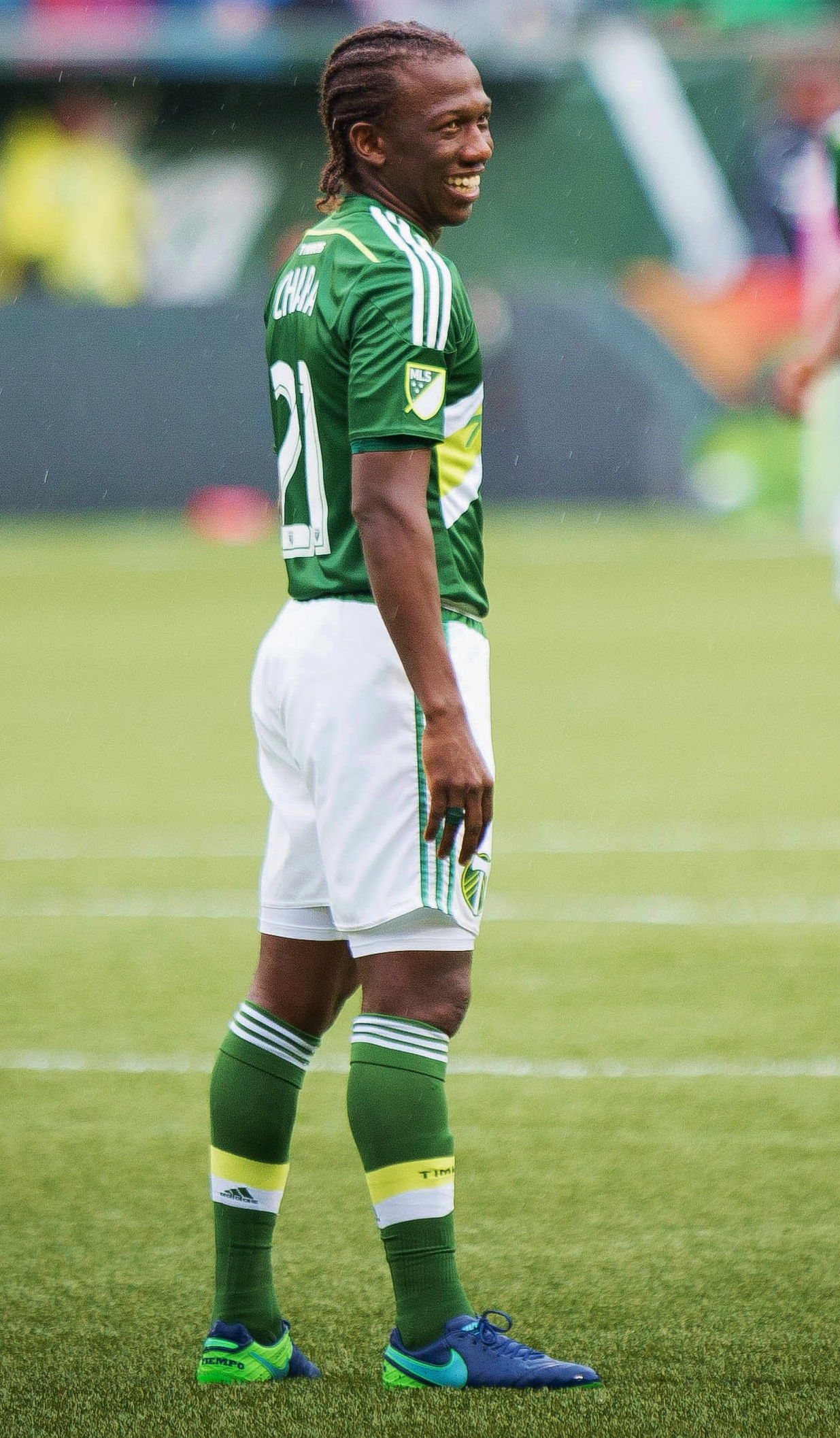
Diego Chará

Rank	Position	Player	Nation	Portland Career	MLS	USOC	Playoffs	CCL	Leagues Cup	Total
1	Midfielder	**Diego Chará**	COL	2011–	387	12	21	8	7	428
2	Midfielder	Diego Valeri	ARG	2013–2021	259	13	22	8	–	302
3	Midfielder	Darlington Nagbe	USA	2011–2017	214	8	12	5	–	239
4	Forward	Dairon Asprilla	COL	2015–2024	203	8	17	4	3	232
5	Midfielder	Sebastián Blanco	ARG	2017–2023	173	9	11	–	3	193
6	Midfielder	Jack Jewsbury	USA	2011–2016	157	8	10	3	–	178
7	Midfielder	Cristhian Paredes	PAR	2018–	157	9	6	3	7	175
8	Defender	Larrys Mabiala	COD	2017–2024	150	7	11	4	1	172
9	Forward	Fanendo Adi	NGA	2014–2018	126	6	6	7	–	145
10	Forward	Rodney Wallace	CRC	2011–2015	120	6	9	4	–	139

As of August 5, 2024. Not all competitions included.

USOC = U.S. Open Cup; CCL = CONCACAF Champions League
Bolded players are currently on the Portland Timbers roster.

==== Goals ====
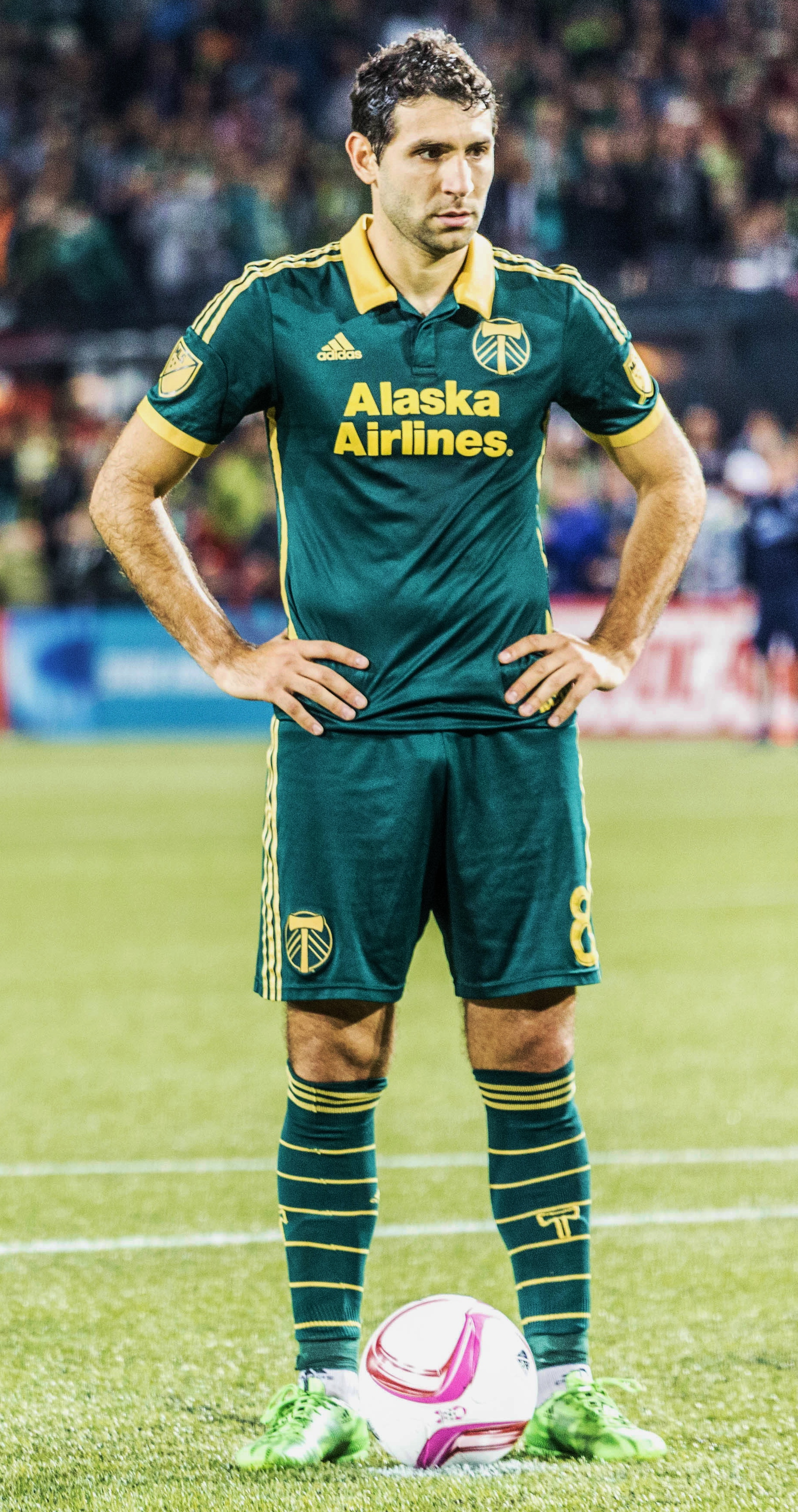
Diego Valeri

Rank	Position	Player	Nation	Portland Career	MLS	USOC	Playoffs	CCL	Leagues Cup	Total
1	Midfielder	Diego Valeri	ARG	2013–2021	86	3	6	4	–	100
2	Forward	Fanendo Adi	NGA	2014–2018	54	–	2	4	–	60
3	Midfielder	Sebastián Blanco	ARG	2017–	33	5	3	–	0	49
4	Midfielder	Darlington Nagbe	USA	2011–2017	27	2	1	1	–	31
5	Forward	Jeremy Ebobisse	USA	2017–2021	26	2	1	–	–	29
6	Forward	Jarosław Niezgoda	POL	2020–2023	19	2	0	–	0	23
7	Forward	Felipe Mora	CHL	2020–	18	–	2	0	2	20
7	Forward	Maximiliano Urruti	ARG	2013–2015	15	3	1	1	–	20
9	Forward	Rodney Wallace	CRC	2011–2015	16	1	2	–	–	19
9	Midfielder	Will Johnson	CAN	2013–2015	16	1	2	0	–	19

As of April 25, 2023. Not all competitions included.

USOC = U.S. Open Cup; CCL = CONCACAF Champions League
Bolded players are currently on the Portland Timbers roster.

==== Assists ====
Rank	Position	Player	Nation	Portland Career	MLS	USOC	Playoffs	CCL	Leagues Cup	Total
1	Midfielder	Diego Valeri	ARG	2013–2021	90	–	8	2	–	100
2	Midfielder	Sebastián Blanco	ARG	2017–2023	42	1	1	–	0	44
3	Midfielder	Darlington Nagbe	USA	2011–2017	30	1	2	–	–	33
4	Midfielder	**Diego Chará**	COL	2011–	27	1	2	–	1	30
5	Forward	Rodney Wallace	CRC	2011–2015	17	1	3	1	–	22
6	Midfielder	Jack Jewsbury	USA	2011–2016	16	–	2	–	–	18
7	Forward	Fanendo Adi	NGA	2014–2018	14	1	1	1	–	17
8	Midfielder	Kalif Alhassan	GHA	2011–2014	12	1	1	2	–	16
9	Midfielder	Dairon Asprilla	COL	2015–2024	10	1	4	0	0	15
10	Defender	Jorge Villafaña	USA	2014–2015, 2018–2020	13	1	0	0	–	14

As of February 10, 2022. Not all competitions included.

USOC = U.S. Open Cup; CCL = CONCACAF Champions League
Bolded players are currently on the Portland Timbers roster.
