= Timber Jim =

American soccer mascot

Jim Serrill, known as Timber Jim, was the mascot for the United Soccer Leagues Portland Timbers soccer team. A fan favorite from the earlier North American Soccer League Portland Timbers, he came back in 2001 to join the new Portland Timbers.

On January 24, 2008, Jim announced his retirement. He was replaced by Timber Joey in the middle of the 2008 season.

== History ==
In 1978, Serrill was coming regularly to Timbers games with his family. Soon he asked Timbers management (who were then owned by the timber company Louisiana-Pacific) if he could bring a chain saw to a game. They reluctantly allowed this and not too long after Timber Jim was created. He later added to the chain saw raised high above his head by bringing a drum and other acts to the game. Soon he was scaling high above the large crowds at Civic Stadium on a tall pole or "snag."

After the original Timbers team folded, Serrill went back to work in the timber industry and later Portland General Electric. When the Timbers were reformed in 2001 he returned with the team. His teenage daughter, Hannah, was killed in an automobile accident in 2004, and in her memory, the Timbers Army made a tradition of singing "You Are My Sunshine", her favourite song, while holding sunflowers, her favourite flower, often led by a tearful Timber Jim.

== Jim's act ==
Timber Jim was known as one of the best performers for any team, largely because of his unique talents as an actual lumberjack. These included:

- Scaling a tall "snag" off the pitch and standing on top high above the crowd (as of 2007 discontinued due to safety concerns).
- Cutting a round from a log with one of his chain saws every time the Timbers score
- Hanging above the crowd on a zip-line with his drum
- Singing "We are the Timbers..." to section 107 (Timbers Army), eventually spelling out T-I-M-B-E-R-S (the R extended, imitating the roaring of a chainsaw)
- Pounding on a large drum, yelling out "Port-land (beat, beat) Tim-bers"
- Doing forward handsprings (quite a feat, as he was in his fifties by the time he retired)

== Retirement ==
On January 24, 2008, Jim announced his retirement. Over the years Jim has brought a few under his wing to pass on the role, with little success. His final farewell was a game played against the Puerto Rico Islanders on April 17, 2008, the Timbers home opener, which was won 1-0. Timber Jim was succeeded by Timber Joey, another lumberman who saws log slices for successful Timbers players.

He would return to Providence Park on December 8, 2015, as part of the celebrations for the Timbers winning MLS Cup 2015. Along with Timber Joey, the two would slice off pieces of the team's victory log to award the two goals scored by Diego Valeri and Rodney Wallace. He would again return to Providence Park for the first game of the 2016 Portland Timbers season against Columbus Crew on March 6, 2016, to unveil the championship banner with Timber Joey.
