= Timbers Army =

Independent supporters group of Portland Timbers soccer club

- Established: 2001
- Type: Supporters' group
- Team: Portland Timbers
- Motto: No Pity
- Location: Portland, Oregon
- Membership: 5,000+
- Colors
- Website: TimbersArmy.org

The Timbers Army is an independent supporters group of Portland Timbers, a soccer club in Major League Soccer—the top tier of the United States soccer pyramid. Its members are known for their loud, enthusiastic support and the raucous atmosphere they create at Timbers games. Centered in section 107 of Providence Park in Portland, Oregon, the Army has grown steadily over the years to encompass much of the north end of the stadium.

== History ==
The Timbers Army was founded in 2001 as the Cascade Rangers, a reference to the Cascade Range of mountains in the Pacific Northwest region of North America. The group began with a group of eight people who decided to step up their support, and began congregating in section 107 (erroneously labeled on the stadium diagram to be behind the north goal) of the stadium then known as PGE Park to create a European-style rooting section for the club, complete with drumming, flags, scarves, smoke bombs and constant chanting and cheering. By 2002, the group had changed its name to the Timbers Army in order to lose any perception of partiality toward Scottish football club Rangers and because the Timbers uniforms at the time resembled those of Rangers rival Celtic. (although this perception has since changed).

As noted in a feature story on the front page of The Oregonian's Sports section in 2004, the Army had grown from a small group of dedicated fans to approximately 200 passionate supporters. By 2005, when the Army was the subject of a cover story by Willamette Week, its game day support was estimated at over 1,000.

In 2008, the group's lobbying was credited with helping to convince the Portland City Council to approve a deal to bring Major League Soccer to Portland in 2011. The Timbers Army were named the fifth most influential Oregon sports figure in 2010 by The Oregonian, two spots ahead of Timbers owner Merritt Paulson. In the piece, sports columnist John Canzano said of the Army:

Drumming, chanting, scarf-wearing soccer supporters transformed overnight from a band of PGE Park rowdies to an effective and influential political organization. Their political clout ends up greasing the wheels on the effort to bring Major League Soccer to Portland.

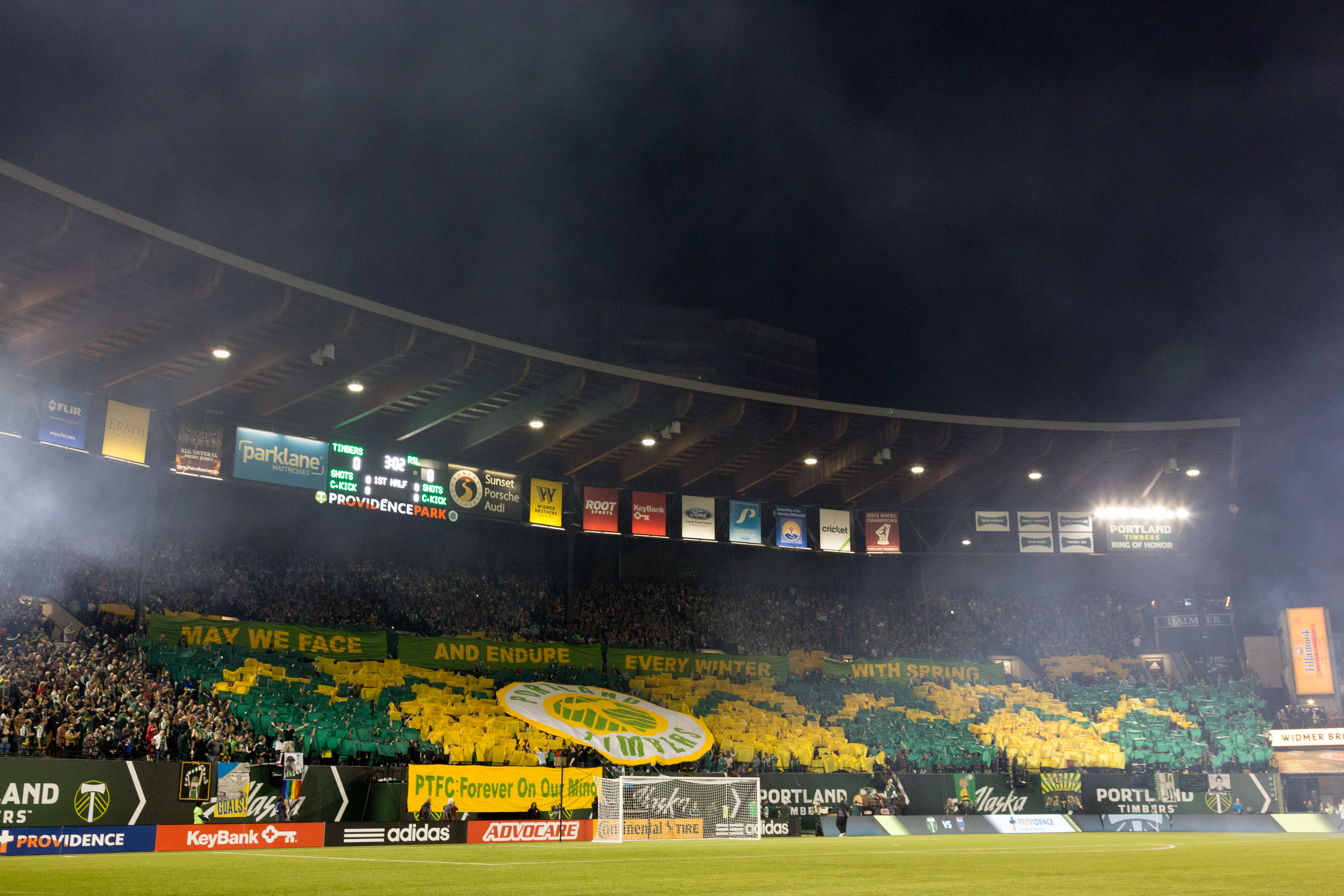
The Army in March 2015

The supporters group gained national exposure in 2009 when they were featured in a two-page photo spread in the July 13–20 issue of Sports Illustrated which showed Army members celebrating after the Timbers scored against Seattle Sounders FC of MLS in the third round of the 2009 Lamar Hunt U.S. Open Cup, a game they lost 2–1. A tifo created by the Timbers Army for that game was in 2011 named one of the five best tifos in MLS history—it featured a giant Timber Jim chainsawing down Seattle's Space Needle—despite the Timbers having played in the USL at the time.

== Culture ==
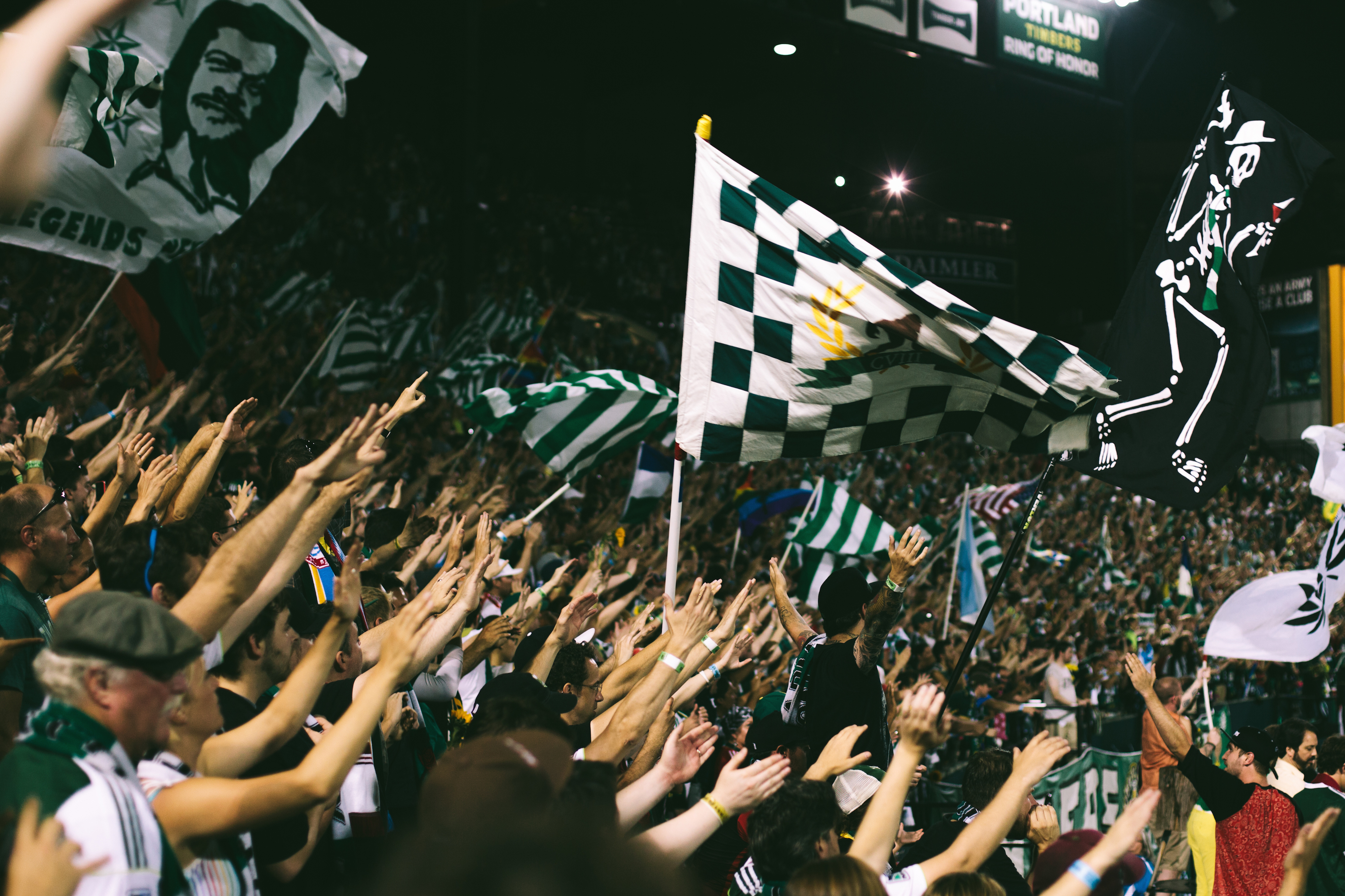
Timbers Army during a 2014 match at Providence Park

The Timbers Army has a strong history and culture of vocal support. The Timbers Army have utilized chants from all over the world (ex. "Korobeiniki"), as well as having drums and trumpets to add to the noise in addition to the inclusion of pogoing, scarf waving, and dancing to add to the effect of various chants. Timbers Army traditions are to sing the song "Portland Boys" immediately after kickoff, "Rose City 'Til I Die" when a goal is scored against the Timbers, "You Are My Sunshine" in the 80th minute, and "Can't Help Falling In Love" in the 85th minute. Various other chants are drawn from Russian, Greek, Latin American, Italian, and Arabian origins, speaking to the diversity of the section.

The group engages in a number of charitable activities, including volunteering for the Portland-based nonprofit Friends of Trees and raising money for a trust fund established for Keiana Serrill, the granddaughter of Timber Jim, the team's lumberjack mascot. Timber Jim's daughter, Hannah, was killed in an automobile accident in 2004, and in her memory, the TA has made a tradition of singing "You Are My Sunshine." Timber Jim retired in 2008, but the tradition is carried on by Jim's successor, "Timber Joey."

In 2010, the Timbers Army established 107 Independent Supporters Trust, or 107IST, a non-profit umbrella supporting the works of the TA, and since 2013, the Rose City Riveters.

== The Iron Front ==
The symbol of the Iron Front

In 2019, the Timbers Army made national news as they clashed with the MLS front office over the use of the Iron Front symbol on flags flown by Timbers supporters. MLS banned the anti-fascist symbol along with far-right regalia in a blanket ban of "political signage", which the Army contested, arguing in a statement that opposition to fascism, racism, and sexism was not political. A protracted public battle between the Army and MLS brass occurred, culminating in a protest during the August game against Seattle where the TA deliberately stayed silent for the first 33 minutes of the nationally-televised clash to commemorate 1933, the year that the Iron Front was disbanded in Nazi Germany.

After the protests by the Timbers Army gained media exposure, Major League Soccer officials announced they would meet with the Army and other supporter groups around the league. A month later, on September 24, 2019, the league announced it would be reversing the policy that prohibited the Iron Front, allowing Timbers supporters to use the symbol again. This was a rare instance in American sports (and one of the first in MLS) that a supporter group had directly taken on the league with an organized response and forced a change in policy.

== 2020 George Floyd protests ==
After the George Floyd/Black Lives Matter protests swelled nationwide and with national attention on Portland, the Army released a statement re-upping their support for marginalized people of color and protestors. Included in the official release, the supporter group stated that they "strongly oppose the systems of racism and injustice that have caused so many black deaths in our country and our communities. [We] continue to mourn the loss of black lives at the hands of police and others", as well as a general call for direct action.

=== Police destruction of No Pity Van ===
The Army adopted a 1995 Chevrolet P30 van nicknamed the "No Pity Van" in 2010 that sells merchandise outside of Providence Park on gamedays. During the George Floyd protests, the No Pity Van had been active in providing water and medical supplies to protestors in downtown Portland. On the night of August 13, 2020, Portland Police Bureau officers slashed all four tires of the van despite the driver complying with police orders to vacate the area. This was the second instance of police vandalism to the van, after a federal officer fired munitions at the van on July 25, damaging the windshield.

In response, the Army released a statement saying they had not only repaired the van but pledged to double down on their support of the protests. The next night, the van was back out on the streets providing aid.

== NWSL abuse scandal and reactions ==
In an October 2021 report published by The Athletic, former Thorns coach Paul Riley was accused of sexual coercion and abusive behavior by two former Thorns players. The resulting fallout caused fissures in the fanbases of both the Thorns and Timbers, with many supporters calling for the removal of Gavin Wilkinson as GM. Owner Merritt Paulson released a statement shortly afterward stating that Wilkinson would no longer oversee Thorns decisions as an investigation commenced.

Through 2022, fan discontent continued; the Timbers Army and Rose City Riveters met with ownership at the start of their respective seasons. The Timbers, one of MLS' attendance leaders and once owners of a lengthy season-ticket waitlist, only managed five sellouts through the regular season, thought to be at least in part due to the lasting effects of the COVID-19 pandemic but also anger from the NWSL scandal.

On October 3, 2022, an official report was released, particularly highlighting reported inaction by Paulson and Wilkinson as well as sexually inappropriate comments made by Thorns/Timbers president Mike Golub toward former Thorns coach and now-current United States Soccer Federation president Cindy Parlow Cone. On October 4, 2022, the Timbers Army and Rose City Riveters formally demanded Wilkinson and Golub leave the club, and Paulson sell. Paulson released a statement declaring the three men would recuse themselves from Thorns duties, without mentioning the Timbers. On October 5, 2022, Wilkinson and Golub were fired from the club.

== Subgroups ==
The Timbers Army is composed of several different subgroups. These subgroups are unique in their own fashion and consist of many different personalities. However, all subgroups fall under the Timbers Army umbrella. Many of the subgroups produce their own special apparel and other items while the proceeds go directly back to Timbers Army causes. Unlike many teams in Major League Soccer, the Timbers Army is the only recognized independent supporters group of the Portland Timbers, while many other clubs have several supporters groups. The subgroups of the Timbers Army rival the size of many other supporters groups in MLS.

Sectional:

In most cases, the numbers of the unit match the section of the stadium where the supporters are ticketed.

- 101st Amphibious Assault
- 102nd Airborne Division
- 103rd Ballistic Unit
- 104th Charlie Company
- 105th Howitzers
- Fighting 106th
- Section 107 (unnamed for historical preservation, however sometimes referred to as "The Woodshed")
- 108th Easy Company
- Eleventy Ones
- The 112 Corner Corps
- The 114th Hellfire
- The 115
- 116 Ultras
- 117 Delta Company
- 119 Los Geht’s
- Del Boca Vista (208 "retirement" community)
- 224 Neverland

Geographical:

- 1st Montana Volunteer Infantry (Montana)
- Appellation Alliance (Oregon Wine Country)
- Sunset Division (Tualatin Valley)
- Capitol City Company (Salem, OR)
- Columbia River Bar Patrol (Astoria, OR)
- Classic City Command (Athens, GA)
- Crossroads Cavalry (Indiana)
- Eastern Bloc (East County of Portland Area)
- East Coast Platoon (East Coast of US)
- D.C. Federal Reserves (Washington, D.C.)
- Massachusetts Militia (Boston, MA)
- Sunshine Squadron (Florida)
- Echo Squadron (Eugene, OR)
- Heartland Regiment (Midwest of US)
- Inland Ultras (Eastern WA & Northern ID)
- Timbers Army Fort Boise (Boise, Idaho & Treasure Valley)
- Jefferson Reserves (Southern Oregon)
- Northern Alliance (Vancouver, WA/SW Washington)
- Timbers Army: Gotham Reserves (New York, NY)
- Lone Star Brigade (Texas)
- Red River Regiment (Oklahoma)
- Northern Scouts (Canada)
- Timbers Army: Covert Ops (Puget Sound (Including Seattle, Tacoma, and Olympia))
- Midnight Sun Elite (Alaska)
- Southland Irregulars (Southern California)
- Timbers Army: Green and Golden Gate (San Francisco Bay Area)
- Fear and Logging Las Vegas (Las Vegas, Nevada)
- Desert Corps (Arizona)
- Natural State Squadron (Arkansas)
- North Star Casuals (Minnesota)
- Bayou Battalion (Louisiana)
- Magnolia Militia (Mississippi)
- Yellowhammer Infantry (Alabama)
- Timbers Army Appalachia (Appalachian Mountains)
- Timbers Army Upper Valley Skirmishers (Vermont & New Hampshire)
- Carolina Airborne Patrol (North Carolina/South Carolina)
- Mt. Bachelor Brigade (Central Oregon)
- Govy Brigade (Mount Hood)
- Rocky Mountain Battalion (Rockies)
- Buckeye Battalion (Ohio)
- Blue Ridge Rangers (Virginia)
- London Timbers (United Kingdom)
- PTFC Ireland (Ireland)
- Brigata Timbers (Italy)
- Portland Timbers FR (France)
- Portugal Timbers (Portugal)
- Portland Timbers BRA (Brazil)
- Tokyo Yosaku (Japan)
- Timbers Russia (Russia)
- Royal Australian Defence (Australia)
- Global Patrol (International group for those around the world without an existing group) (Earth)

== Supporters Teams ==
The Timbers Army fields seven affiliated supporters teams that play in the Greater Portland Soccer District, a Portland area adult soccer league. All teams play a Spring and Fall season as well as participating in the Clive Charles Memorial North End Cup. This tournament is a point based competition between all teams with the winner going on to represent the Timbers Army against a Seattle Sounders FC Emerald City Supporters team in a supporters Cascadian Champions League. All players are required to be 107ist members, as well as each team performing service related to Timbers Army causes.

Timbers Army Affiliate Teams

- Whipsaws FC (Women's Over-30)
- Whipsaws FC Open (Women's Open Division)
- FC Portlandia (Division 1)
- FC Dynamo (Division 1)
- Cascade Rangers FC (Division 4)
- North End United (Division 4)
- Rose City Athletic (Division 4)
- Northern Alliance FC (Division 4)
- FC Bridge City (Division 4) (originally Guerreros Verdes)
- Multnomah Forest AFC (Division 4)
- Tanner Creek Renegades (Division 4)
- Deacon Blue (Division 4)
- Sporting BDA (Division 4)
- Clinton City Wanderers (Division 4)
- Nomads FC (Over-30 Division 2)
- Buckman United (Over-30 Division 3)
- Old Growth FC (Over 40 Division 2)

== Non-Profit ==
The 107 Independent Supporters Trust is a member-based non-profit organization open to anyone who loves soccer. It serves to coordinate the activities of the Timbers Army and Rose City Riveters. In addition to supporting the Timbers and Thorns, 107IST conduct a variety of community projects including free CPR training in English and Spanish, they manage a library of soccer books, support the Gisele Currier Scholarship Fund, build youth soccer fields and more.

== Rose City Riveters ==
The Rose City Riveters is the supporters group of Portland Thorns FC, Portland's National Women's Soccer League club.

== Rival Groups ==
- Emerald City Supporters
- Vancouver Southsiders
