= Merritt Paulson =

American businessman

- Born: Henry Merritt Paulson III; 1972 or 1973 (age 53–54)
- Education: Hamilton College, New York (BA); Harvard University (MBA)
- Spouse: Heather Mahar
- Children: 2
- Father: Henry Paulson

Henry Merritt Paulson III (born 1972/1973) is an American businessman who is the minority owner of Peregrine Sports, LLC, which owns the operating rights to the Portland Timbers, a Major League Soccer (MLS) team. He and his company also founded and formerly owned Portland Thorns FC, a National Women's Soccer League (NWSL) team; both clubs are based in Portland, Oregon.

== Early life and education ==
Paulson's father is Henry Paulson, a banker who was United States Secretary of the Treasury, and chairman and CEO of Goldman Sachs. His mother is Wendy (née Judge) Paulson. In 1995, Paulson graduated from Hamilton College with a Bachelor of Arts degree in English. He later earned a Masters of Business Administration from Harvard Business School.

== Career ==
=== Portland Beavers ===
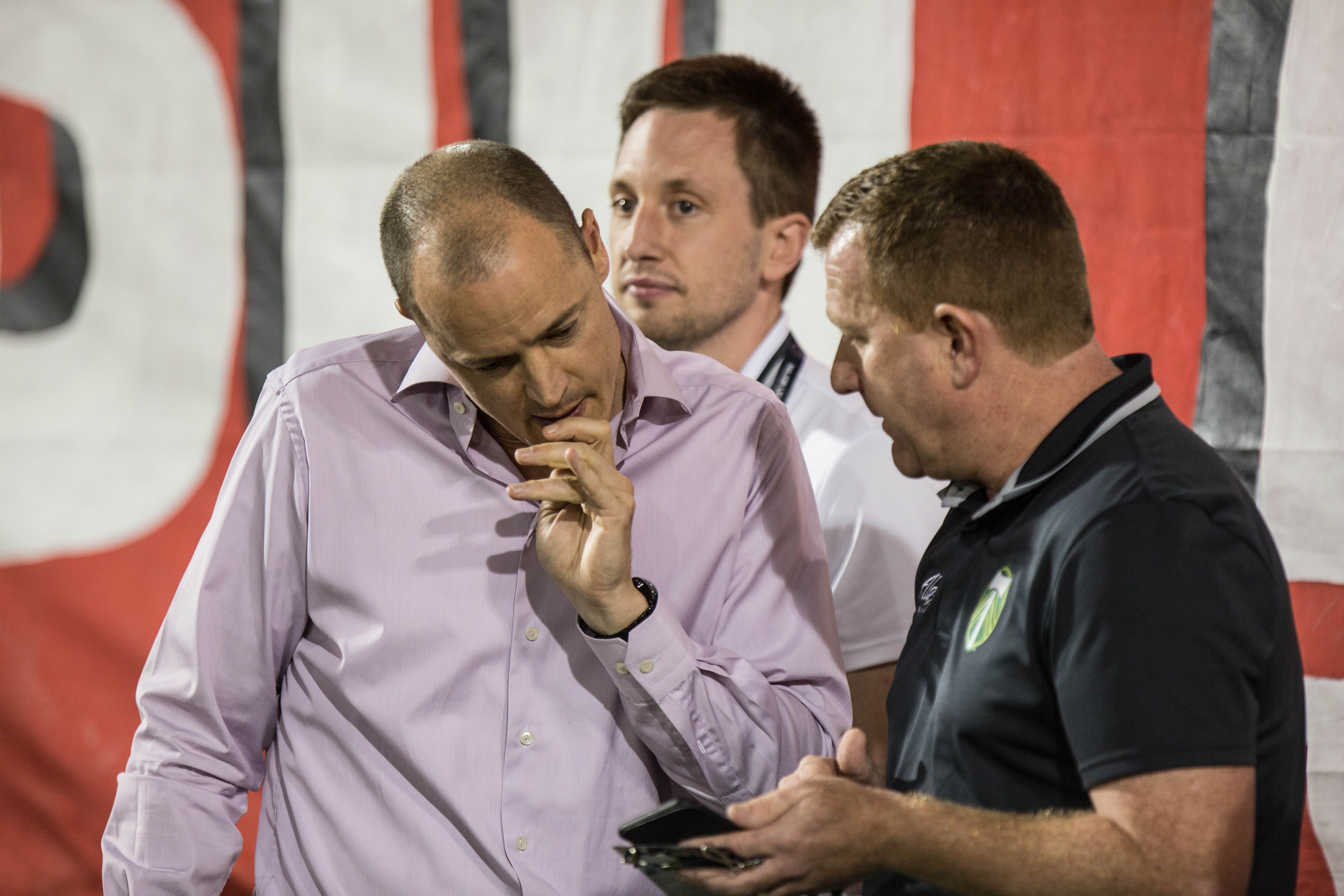
Paulson (left) with Timbers GM Gavin Wilkinson in 2016

In anticipation of acquiring sports franchises, Paulson formed Shortstop, LLC, which was organized as a Delaware entity. In May 2007 Paulson's investment group, Shortstop, purchased the Portland Beavers and the Portland Timbers from California businessman Abe Alizadeh. The purchase made Shortstop the Beavers' fourth owners since 2001. Hank Paulson, Merritt Paulson's father, was a minority partner in the company. The Portland Beavers played the 2007–2010 seasons under the ownership and management of Paulson's Shortstop organization.

In 2010, Paulson sold the Portland Beavers, to focus on soccer. Paulson and his advisors moved ahead with plans to remodel PGE Park. The stadium was remodeled into a soccer-and-football only configuration for the MLS's 2011 expansion Portland Timbers. That meant that there was no longer a stadium facility in Portland for the Beavers to play on the AAA baseball level.

=== Portland Timbers and Peregrine Sports LLC ===
Paulson established Peregrine Sports LLC. In 2009, the city of Portland and the Merritt Paulson-led Peregrine were awarded a Major League Soccer (MLS) expansion franchise for 2011, named the Portland Timbers. The Portland City Council approved a $31 million agreement to renovate PGE Park as a soccer- and football-specific stadium. Naming rights were sold for the stadium. After cost overruns, the renovations totaling $40 million were complete. The former PGE Park became Jeld-Wen Field now known as Providence Park.

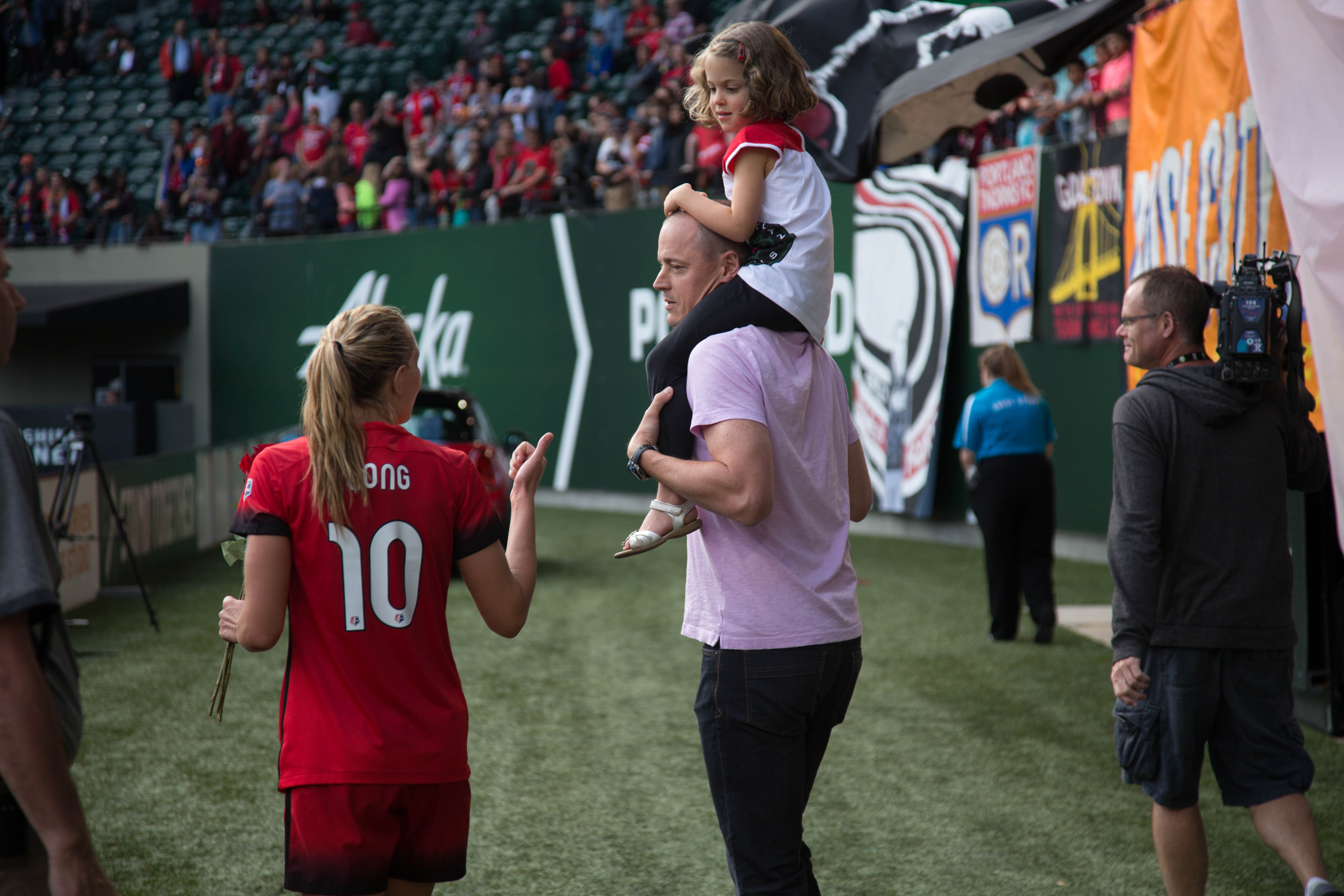
Paulson (right) with his daughter, and former Thorns FC player Allie Long in 2016

A new women's national soccer league was created for the 2013 season. Paulson was the only MLS team owner to decide to also support a women's team in their new league. That team was named the Portland Thorns FC, and featured US Women's National Soccer team players Tobin Heath, Meghan Klingenberg, Lindsey Horan, Adrianna Franch, and Canadian Women's National Soccer team player Christine Sinclair on the roster.

=== Role in the Paul Riley Abuse Scandal ===
In September 2021, two former Portland Thorns players went public with their accusations of sexual coercion against former Thorns coach Paul Riley revealing that this abuse was the reason that the Thorns fired Riley in 2015. In October 2022, a report commissioned by the United States Soccer Federation detailed Paulson publicly thanking Riley and wishing him well at the time of his departure from the club. Paulson congratulated the Western New York Flash on hiring Riley in an email to club's President, stating "congrats on the Riley hire. I have a lot of affection for him.” When contacted by NC Courage leadership about hiring Riley, Paulson downplayed the abuse of Portland Thorns players saying it "basically was [a case of] ‘poor judgment'" and described difficulty managing the roster as the reason for Riley's departure from Portland.

On October 4, 2022, Paulson announced he, along with Gavin Wilkinson and team president Mike Golub, would step aside from all Thorns-related duties. Earlier that day, the Timbers Army and Rose City Riveters formally demanded the removal of Wilkinson and Golub and for Paulson to sell the teams due to the reports of abuse the club had allegedly covered up. On October 5, Wilkinson and Golub were fired.

Paulson stepped down as CEO of the teams on October 11, 2022. Though he effectively still owns the club, his general counsel, Heather Davis, is CEO.

Paulson announced he was selling the Thorns on December 1, 2022.

== Personal life ==
Paulson is married to Heather Mahar, who was a contestant on CBS's television program The Amazing Race 3. The couple have two daughters.
