= Jimer Fory =

Colombian footballer (born 2002)

Personal information
- Full name: Jimer Esteban Fory Mejia
- Date of birth: 24 May 2002 (age 24)
- Place of birth: Santander de Quilichao, Colombia
- Height: 1.87 m (6 ft 1 1/2 in)
- Position: Defender

Team information
- Current team: Portland Timbers
- Number: 27

Senior career*
Years	Team	Apps	(Gls)
2020–2024	Atlético Nacional	19	(0)
2022–2024	→ Deportivo Pereira (loan)	48	(1)
2024–2025	Independiente Medellín	27	(0)
2025–	Portland Timbers	42	(0)

International career
2024	Colombia U23	3	(0)
- * Club domestic league appearances and goals as of 00:15 (UTC) 27 May 2026

Jimer Esteban Fory Mejia (born 24 May 2002) is a Colombian professional footballer who plays as a defender for Major League Soccer side Portland Timbers. He is a Colombia U23 international.

== Club career ==
A left back, he played on loan at Deportivo Pereira from Atletico Nacional in 2022 and 2023. He played for the club in the Copa Libertadores.

He joined Independiente Medellin in January 2024 on loan from Atletico Nacional. That season, he played in the Copa Sudamericana for the club. In November 2024, Atlético Nacional were reported to have a filed a lawsuit against Independiente Medellín due to alleged lack of payments from the Fory move.

On 4 February 2025, Fory signed with Major League Soccer side Portland Timbers on a four-year deal.

== International career ==
He is a Colombia U23 international.
