= 2020 Colorado Rapids season =

Colorado Rapids
2020 season
- Owner: Stan Kroenke
- Head coach: Robin Fraser
- Major League Soccer: Conference: 5th Overall: 10th
- MLS Cup playoffs: First round
- MLS is Back Tournament: Group stage
- Top goalscorer: League: Jonathan Lewis; Cole Bassett (5 each); All: Jonathan Lewis; Cole Bassett (5 each)
- Biggest win: RSL 0–5 COL (September 12); COL 5–0 SJ (September 23)
- Biggest defeat: SKC 4–0 COL (October 24)
Home colors	Away colors

The 2020 Colorado Rapids season was the club's twenty-fifth season of existence and their twenty-fifth consecutive season in Major League Soccer (MLS), the top flight of American soccer. The club qualified for the MLS Cup Playoffs for the first time since the 2016 season. Colorado were also set compete in the U.S. Open Cup before its cancellation. The season covers the period from October 7, 2019, to the conclusion of the MLS Cup Playoffs.

== Background ==
Colorado finished the 2019 season 9th in the Western Conference table, and 16th overall in MLS. Kei Kamara lead Colorado with 14 goals across all competitions. The club fired head coach Anthony Hudson on May 1, 2019, following a nine-match winless streak to start the season. Conor Casey served as interim head coach until the hiring of Robin Fraser as the club's new head coach on August 25. Outside of MLS play, the Rapids played in the 2019 edition of the U.S. Open Cup, where they lost in the fourth round to New Mexico United.

== Overview ==
The Rapids started the season with wins over D.C. United and Orlando City SC before Major League Soccer paused the 2020 season due to COVID-19. The league returned to action in July with the MLS is Back Tournament in Orlando, Fla., with Colorado in Group D with Minnesota United FC, Real Salt Lake and Sporting Kansas City. After another month-long pause, MLS returned to in-market play in August. Colorado took three points from four games before reclaiming the Rocky Mountain Cup with a 5-0 win over RSL on Sept. 12. The win was Colorado's first ever at Rio Tinto Stadium and started a run of three wins in four, including three clean sheets. After a series of positive COVID test results, MLS postponed Rapids matches for one month. In all, five Rapids matches were cancelled, which, in addition to other cancellations around the league, prompted MLS to alter MLS Cup Playoff qualification to a points per game basis. The Rapids won their final three matches to qualify for the Audi 2020 MLS Cup Playoffs for the first time since 2016, capturing the fifth seed in the Western Conference. Colorado visited fourth-seed Minnesota and lost, 3-0.

The season saw head coach Robin Fraser post the best record of any Rapids head coach through his first 25 games in charge. In their first 25 games under Fraser, the Rapids scored 47 goals, won 13 games and earned 43 points, all the most by a Rapids head coach since the introduction of draws to MLS in 2000.

After scoring the third-most goals in MLS with 58 in 2019, Colorado scored 32 goals in 18 games. Colorado's 1.78 goals per game ranked sixth in MLS in 2020. The Rapids also posted their first positive goal differential (+4) since 2016 and the seventh time in club history.

Several Rapids enjoyed breakout years in 2020, including Homegrown midfielder Cole Bassett and Homegrown defender Sam Vines. Bassett, from Littleton, Colo., turned 19 in July and finished the season as Colorado's leader with five goals and five assists. Vines, 21 years old from Colorado Springs, was the only player on the roster to play every minute in the regular season, adding the first goal and three assists of his MLS career. The duo was named to MLS 22 Under 22 for a second consecutive year. In February, Vines became the first Rapids Academy product to start a match for the USMNT, while Bassett scored four goals in four appearances with the U.S. U-20s and earned his first senior USMNT call-up for the December 2020 camp, joining Rapids teammates Vines and midfielder Kellyn Acosta. It was Acosta's first call-up in two years.

== Roster ==
As of September 23, 2020

Note: Flags indicate national team as defined under FIFA eligibility rules; some limited exceptions apply. Players may hold more than one non-FIFA nationality.

No.	Pos.	Nation	Player
1	GK	USA	Clint Irwin
2	DF	USA	Keegan Rosenberry
3	DF	USA	Drew Moor
4	DF	SCO	Danny Wilson
5	DF	USA	Auston Trusty
6	DF	GHA	Lalas Abubakar
7	FW	USA	Jonathan Lewis
9	FW	FRA	Nicolas Benezet
10	MF	USA	Kellyn Acosta
11	FW	CHI	Diego Rubio
13	DF	USA	Sam Vines (HGP)
15	GK	USA	Andre Rawls

No.	Pos.	Nation	Player
18	DF	USA	Jeremy Kelly
19	MF	ENG	Jack Price (captain)
20	MF	URU	Nicolás Mezquida
21	MF	DEN	Younes Namli (DP)
24	DF	USA	Kortne Ford (HGP)
26	MF	USA	Cole Bassett (HGP)
27	DF	NZL	Deklan Wynne
32	MF	USA	Collen Warner
33	DF	IRI	Steven Beitashour
50	GK	USA	William Yarbrough
52	FW	ARG	Braian Galván
99	FW	BRA	Andre Shinyashiki

=== Out on loan ===
As of March 6, 2020

Note: Flags indicate national team as defined under FIFA eligibility rules; some limited exceptions apply. Players may hold more than one non-FIFA nationality.

No.	Pos.	Nation	Player
12	FW	USA	Niki Jackson
14	DF	RWA	Abdul Rwatubyaye
16	MF	USA	Will Vint (HGP)
22	DF	USA	Sebastian Anderson (HGP)
29	FW	USA	Matt Hundley (HGP)
30	GK	USA	Abraham Rodriguez (HGP)

== Competitions ==
Win Draw Loss Upcoming fixture

=== Preseason ===
January 29 1	Cal State Fullerton Titans	1–1	Colorado Rapids	Fullerton, California
11:30AM MST	93' (pen.)	Report	Moor 52'	Stadium: Titan Stadium
Note: One 45-minute period, followed by two 30-minute periods.f

February 1 2	Orange County SC	0–4	Colorado Rapids	Irvine, California
		Report	Bassett 23'; Kamara 39'; Jackson 55', 69'	Stadium: Orange County Great Park

February 8 3	Colorado Rapids	0–4	Toronto FC	Irvine, California
12:00PM MST		Report; Report	Gallardo 20'; Altidore 46'; Osorio 49'; Shaffelburg 67'	Stadium: University of California, Irvine
Note: Played in two 60-minute halves.

February 12 4	Colorado Rapids	1–3	New England Revolution	Carson, California
	Lewis 57'	Report	Rivera 7', 19'; Buchanan 53'	Stadium: Dignity Health Sports Park

February 15 5	Colorado Rapids	4–2	Chicago Fire FC	Carson, California
12:00 PM	Shinyashiki 22'; Nicholson 53'; Acosta 60'; Mezquida 84'	Report; Report	Sapong 9'; Collier 79'	Stadium: Dignity Health Sports Park

February 19 5	LA Galaxy	2–1	Colorado Rapids	California
	DePuy 45'; González 76'	Report	Rubio 15'	Stadium: Dignity Health Sports Park

February 22 7	Colorado Rapids	1–1	Toronto FC	Carson, California
12:00 PM	Shinyashiki 3'	Report	Endoh 1'	Stadium: Dignity Health Sports Park

=== Major League Soccer ===
==== Standings ====
===== Western Conference =====
Pos	Team	Pld	W	L	T	GF	GA	GD	Pts	PPG	Qualification
3	Portland Timbers	23	11	6	6	46	35	+11	39	1.70	Qualification for the playoffs first round and 2021 CONCACAF Champions League (Note: As MLS is Back Tournament winners)
4	Minnesota United FC	21	9	5	7	36	26	+10	34	1.62	Qualification for the playoffs first round
5	Colorado Rapids	18	8	6	4	32	28	+4	28	1.56	Qualification for the playoffs first round
6	FC Dallas	22	9	6	7	28	24	+4	34	1.55	Qualification for the playoffs first round
7	Los Angeles FC	22	9	8	5	47	39	+8	32	1.45	Qualification for the playoffs first round

Source: MLS
Rules for classification: 1) points per game; 2) total wins per match played; 3) total goal differential per match played; 4) total goals scored per match played; 5) fewest disciplinary points per match played; 6) away goal differential per away match played; 7) away goals scored per away match played; 8) home goal differential per home match played; 9) home goals scored per home match played; 10) coin toss or drawing of lots.

===== Overall table =====
2020 MLS overall standings
Pos	Team	Pld	W	L	T	GF	GA	GD	Pts	PPG	Qualification
8	Portland Timbers (M)	23	11	6	6	46	35	+11	39	1.70	2021 CONCACAF Champions League (Note: As MLS is Back Tournament winners (USA3))
9	Minnesota United FC	21	9	5	7	36	26	+10	34	1.62	
10	Colorado Rapids	18	8	6	4	32	28	+4	28	1.56	
11	FC Dallas	22	9	6	7	28	24	+4	34	1.55	
12	Los Angeles FC	22	9	8	5	47	39	+8	32	1.45	

Source: MLS
Rules for classification: 1) points per game; 2) total wins per match played; 3) total goal differential per match played; 4) total goals scored per match played; 5) fewest disciplinary points per match played; 6) away goal differential per away match played; 7) away goals scored per away match played; 8) home goal differential per home match played; 9) home goals scored per home match played; 10) coin toss or drawing of lots.
(M) MLS is Back Tournament champions

==== Results summary ====
Overall								Home						Away					
Pld	Pts	W	L	T	GF	GA	GD	W	L	T	GF	GA	GD	W	L	T	GF	GA	GD
18	28	8	6	4	32	28	+4	3	1	3	15	10	+5	5	5	1	17	18	−1

Source: MLS standings
Pld = Matches played; Pts = Points; W = Matches won; T = Matches tied; L = Matches lost; GF = Goals for; GA = Goals against; GD = Goal difference

==== Results by round ====
Round	1	2	3	4	5	6	8	9	10	11	7	12	13	14	15	16	17	18
Stadium	A	H	A	A	H	H	H	A	H	A	A	A	H	A	A	H	A	A
Result	W	W	L	L	D	L	D	D	D	W	L	W	W	L	L	W	W	W

Source: Colorado schedule
A = Away; H = Home; W = Win; D = Draw; L = Loss

==== Match results ====
February 29 1	D.C. United	1–2	Colorado Rapids	Washington, D.C.
11:00 AM MST	Canouse 60'; Moreno (yellow card) 64'; Mora (yellow card) 76'; Brillant (yellow card) 87'	Report	Shinyashiki (yellow card) 58'; Kamara 67'; Lewis 90+2'	Stadium: Audi Field; Attendance: 16,932; Referee: Nima Saghafi

March 7 2	Colorado Rapids	2–1	Orlando City SC	Commerce City, Colorado
7:00 PM MST	Namli (yellow card) 24', (goal) 64'; Moor (yellow card) 55', (goal) 90'; Acosta (yellow card) 76'	Report	Moutinho (yellow card) 15'; Schlegel (yellow card) 81'; Mueller 82'	Stadium: Dick's Sporting Goods Park; Attendance: 13,062; Referee: Joseph Dickerson

August 22 6	Colorado Rapids	1–4	Real Salt Lake	Commerce City, Colorado
7:00 PM MDT	Herrera 38' (o.g.)	Report	Kreilach 57', (yellow card) 78'; Chang 76', (yellow card) 88'; Baird 85'; Meram 89'	Stadium: Dick's Sporting Goods Park; Attendance: 0 Referee: Fotis Bazakos

August 29 8	Colorado Rapids	1–1	Sporting Kansas City	Commerce City, Colorado
7:00 PM MDT	Price (yellow card) 47'; Acosta (yellow card) 52'; Bassett 57'; Rubio (yellow card) 82'	Report	Smith (yellow card) 63'; Kinda (yellow card) 65' (yellow-red card) 78'; Busio 67'	Stadium: Dick's Sporting Goods Park; Attendance: 0 Referee: Armando Villarreal

September 5 9	San Jose Earthquakes	1–1	Colorado Rapids	San Jose, California
8:30 PM MDT	Marie (yellow card) 1'; Alanís (yellow card) 38'; Jungwirth (yellow card) 50'; Espinoza (yellow card) 57'; Wondolowski 59' (pen.)	Report	Acosta (yellow card) 45'; Kamara 81'; Bassett (yellow card) 83'; Abubakar (yellow card) 90+1'	Stadium: Earthquakes Stadium; Attendance: 0 Referee: Kevin Stott

September 9 10	Colorado Rapids	1–1	Houston Dynamo	Commerce City, Colorado
7:00 PM MDT	Abubakar (yellow card) 6', (goal) 90+6'; Lewis (yellow card) 20'; Rubio (yellow card) 90+2'	Report	Ramirez 46'	Stadium: Dick's Sporting Goods Park; Attendance: 0 Referee: Fotis Bazakos

September 12 11	Real Salt Lake	0–5	Colorado Rapids	Sandy, Utah
7:30 PM MDT	Toia (yellow card) 54'; Martínez (red card) 64'	Report	Rubio 3', 10'; Vines 49'; Galván 55'; Price (yellow card) 69'; Bassett 88'	Stadium: Rio Tinto Stadium; Attendance: 0 Referee: Ramy Touchan

September 16 7	FC Dallas	4–1	Colorado Rapids	Frisco, Texas
6:30 PM MDT	Mosquera 41', 57', 78'; Santos (yellow card) 44'; Jara 49'	Report	Shinyashiki 63'	Stadium: Toyota Stadium; Attendance: 0 Referee: Ismail Elfath
Note: Game was originally scheduled for August 26.

September 19 12	LA Galaxy	0–2	Colorado Rapids	Carson, California
8:30 PM MDT	DePuy (yellow card) 63'; Araujo (yellow card) 72' (yellow-red card) 75'; Steres (yellow card) 90+6'	Report	Bassett 40'; Lewis 78'	Stadium: Dignity Health Sports Park; Attendance: 0 Referee: Ted Unkel

September 23 13	Colorado Rapids	5–0	San Jose Earthquakes	Commerce City, Colorado
7:00 PM MDT	Bassett 35'; Acosta (yellow card) 38'; Shinyashiki (yellow card) 44', (goal) 84'; Lewis 50'; Thompson 70' (o.g.); Mezquida 79'	Report	Judson (yellow card) 43'; Hoesen (yellow card) 86'	Stadium: Dick's Sporting Goods Park; Attendance: 0 Referee: Drew Fischer

October 7	Colorado Rapids	v	Los Angeles FC	Commerce City, Colorado
7:00 PM MDT				Stadium: Dick's Sporting Goods Park; Attendance: 0
Note: Match was postponed after a staff member from the Colorado Rapids tested positive for COVID-19. Postponed matches were later cancelled.

October 10	Colorado Rapids	v	LA Galaxy	Commerce City, Colorado
5:00 PM MDT				Stadium: Dick's Sporting Goods Park; Attendance: 0
Note: Match was postponed after a staff member from the Colorado Rapids tested positive for COVID-19. Postponed matches were later cancelled.

October 14	Seattle Sounders FC	v	Colorado Rapids	Seattle, Washington
8:00 PM MDT				Stadium: CenturyLink Field; Attendance: 0
Note: Match was postponed after a staff member from the Colorado Rapids tested positive for COVID-19. Postponed matches were later cancelled.

October 18	Colorado Rapids	v	Real Salt Lake	Commerce City, Colorado
7:00 PM MDT				Stadium: Dick's Sporting Goods Park; Attendance: 0
Note: Match was postponed after a staff member from the Colorado Rapids tested positive for COVID-19. Postponed matches were later cancelled.

October 21	Colorado Rapids	v	Sporting Kansas City	Commerce City, Colorado
7:00 PM MDT				Stadium: Dick's Sporting Goods Park; Attendance: 0
Note: Reschedule of postponed September 27 match Match was postponed again after a staff member from the Colorado Rapids tested positive for COVID-19.

October 24 14	Sporting Kansas City	4–0	Colorado Rapids	Kansas City, Kansas
6:30 PM MDT	Dia (yellow card) 11'; Pulido 54'; Fontàs 67'; Shelton (yellow card) 74'; Lindsey (yellow card) 85'; Kinda 88'; Gerso 90+3', (yellow card) 90+4'	Report	Warner (yellow card) 23'; Abubakar (yellow card) 47'	Stadium: Children's Mercy Park; Attendance: 0 Referee: Drew Fischer

October 28 15	Minnesota United FC	2–1	Colorado Rapids	Saint Paul, Minnesota
6:00 PM MDT	Lod 44'; Abubakar 89' (o.g.)	Report	Price (yellow card) 32'; Wilson (yellow card) 57'; Shinyashiki 69'	Stadium: Allianz Field; Attendance: 0 Referee: Tori Penso

November 1 16	Colorado Rapids	3–1	Seattle Sounders FC	Commerce City, Colorado
7:00 PM MDT	Shinyashiki 11'; Rosenberry 42'; Bassett 75'	Report	Morris 22', (yellow card) 73'; Gómez Andrade (yellow card) 35'	Stadium: Dick's Sporting Goods Park; Attendance: 0 Referee: Ismir Pekmic

November 4 17	Portland Timbers	0–1	Colorado Rapids	Portland, Oregon
8:00 PM MDT	D. Chará (yellow card) 49'; Bonilla (yellow card) 81'; Župarić (yellow card) 90+4'	Report	Acosta 83'; Mezquida (yellow card) 90+1'	Stadium: Providence Park; Attendance: 0 Referee: Joseph Dickerson
Note: Originally scheduled for October 3, postponed due to members of the Rapids testing positive for COVID-19

November 8 18	Houston Dynamo	1–2	Colorado Rapids	Houston, Texas
4:30 PM MDT	Figueroa (yellow card) 42'; Cerén (yellow card) 56'; Cabrera (yellow card) 59'; Manotas 69'	Report	Namli 61'; Abubakar (yellow card) 90+1'; Rubio 90+3'	Stadium: BBVA Stadium; Attendance: 0 Referee: Alex Chilowicz

=== MLS Cup Playoffs ===
The Rapids clinched a spot in the playoffs on November 4.

November 22 First Round	(4) Minnesota United FC	3–0	(5) Colorado Rapids	Saint Paul, Minnesota
5:30 PM MST	Molino 22', 79'; Boxall (yellow card) 52'; Lod 54'	Report	Namli (yellow card) 44'; Abubakar (yellow card) 50'	Stadium: Allianz Field; Attendance: 0 Referee: Ted Unkel

=== MLS is Back Tournament ===
==== Group stage ====
Group D results
Pos	Team	Pld	W	D	L	GF	GA	GD	Pts	Qualification
1	Sporting Kansas City	3	2	0	1	6	4	+2	6	Advanced to knockout stage
2	Minnesota United FC	3	1	2	0	4	3	+1	5	Advanced to knockout stage
3	Real Salt Lake	3	1	1	1	2	2	0	4	Advanced to knockout stage
4	Colorado Rapids	3	0	1	2	4	7	−3	1	

Source: MLS
July 12, 2020
8:30 pm MDT

Real Salt Lake	2–0	Colorado Rapids
Rusnák 27'; Kreilach 76'	Report

ESPN Wide World of Sports Complex, Bay Lake, Florida
Attendance: 0
Referee: Jair Marrufo

July 17, 2020
6:00 pm MDT

Sporting Kansas City	3–2	Colorado Rapids
Shelton 65'; Pulido 72'; Zusi 90+1'	Report	Acosta 6'; Lewis 84'

ESPN Wide World of Sports Complex, Bay Lake, Florida
Referee: David Gantar

July 22, 2020
7:00 am MDT

Colorado Rapids	2–2	Minnesota United FC
Kamara 19'; Lewis 59'	Report	Finlay 36', 43'

ESPN Wide World of Sports Complex, Bay Lake, Florida
Referee: Guido Gonzales, Jr.

=== U.S. Open Cup ===
Note: The 2020 U.S Open Cup was suspended on March 13, due to the COVID-19 pandemic. The tournament was canceled on August 14.

Third round	–
(MDT)

== Statistics ==
=== Appearances and goals ===
Numbers after plus–sign (+) denote appearances as a substitute.

No.	Pos	Nat	Player	Total		MLS		MLS Cup Playoffs	
No.	Pos	Nat	Player	Apps	Goals	Apps	Goals	Apps	Goals
1	GK	(United States) USA	Clint Irwin	4	0	4	0	0	0
2	DF	(United States) USA	Keegan Rosenberry	18	1	16+1	1	1	0
3	DF	(United States) USA	Drew Moor	8	1	5+3	1	0	0
4	DF	(Scotland) SCO	Danny Wilson	10	0	9	0	1	0
5	DF	(United States) USA	Auston Trusty	8	0	5+3	0	0	0
6	DF	(Ghana) GHA	Lalas Abubakar	18	1	17	1	1	0
7	FW	(United States) USA	Jonathan Lewis	19	5	7+11	5	1	0
9	FW	(France) FRA	Nicolas Benezet	13	0	5+7	0	0+1	0
10	MF	(United States) USA	Kellyn Acosta	16	2	14+1	2	1	0
11	FW	(Chile) CHI	Diego Rubio	17	3	12+4	3	1	0
13	DF	(United States) USA	Sam Vines	19	1	18	1	0+1	0
15	GK	(United States) USA	Andre Rawls	0	0	0	0	0	0
18	DF	(United States) USA	Jeremy Kelly	8	0	2+6	0	0	0
19	MF	(England) ENG	Jack Price	17	0	14+2	0	1	0
20	MF	(Uruguay) URU	Nicolás Mezquida	18	1	2+15	1	0+1	0
21	MF	(Denmark) DEN	Younes Namli	18	2	16+1	2	1	0
24	DF	(United States) USA	Kortne Ford	0	0	0	0	0	0
26	MF	(United States) USA	Cole Bassett	15	5	12+2	5	1	0
27	DF	(New Zealand) NZL	Deklan Wynne	0	0	0	0	0	0
32	MF	(United States) USA	Collen Warner	7	0	4+3	0	0	0
50	GK	(United States) USA	William Yarbrough	15	0	14	0	1	0
52	FW	(Argentina) ARG	Braian Galván	10	1	2+7	1	0+1	0
99	FW	(Brazil) BRA	Andre Shinyashiki	16	4	14+1	4	1	0
Players transferred/loaned out during the season
12	FW	(United States) USA	Niki Jackson	0	0	0	0	0	0
14	DF	(Rwanda) RWA	Abdul Rwatubyaye	0	0	0	0	0	0
16	MF	(United States) USA	Will Vint	0	0	0	0	0	0
22	DF	(United States) USA	Sebastian Anderson	0	0	0	0	0	0
23	FW	(Sierra Leone) SLE	Kei Kamara	9	3	5+4	3	0	0
28	FW	(Scotland) SCO	Sam Nicholson	2	0	2	0	0	0
29	FW	(United States) USA	Matt Hundley	0	0	0	0	0	0
30	GK	(United States) USA	Abraham Rodriguez	0	0	0	0	0	0

- Last updated: November 22, 2020
- Source: Colorado stats

=== Top scorers ===
Rank	Position	Number	Name	MLS	MLS Cup Playoffs	Total
1	FW	7	(United States) Jonathan Lewis	5	0	5
1	MF	26	(United States) Cole Bassett	5	0	5
3	FW	99	(Brazil) Andre Shinyashiki	4	0	4
4	FW	11	(Chile) Diego Rubio	3	0	3
4	FW	23	(Sierra Leone) Kei Kamara	3	0	3
6	MF	10	(United States) Kellyn Acosta	2	0	2
6	MF	21	(Denmark) Younes Namli	2	0	2
8	DF	2	(United States) Keegan Rosenberry	1	0	1
8	DF	3	(United States) Drew Moor	1	0	1
8	DF	6	(Ghana) Lalas Abubakar	1	0	1
8	DF	13	(United States) Sam Vines	1	0	1
8	MF	20	(Uruguay) Nicolás Mezquida	1	0	1
8	FW	52	(Argentina) Braian Galván	1	0	1
Total				30	0	30

- Last updated: November 22, 2020
- Source: Team Goals

=== Top assists ===
Rank	Position	Number	Name	MLS	MLS Cup Playoffs	Total
1	MF	26	(United States) Cole Bassett	5	0	5
2	FW	11	(Chile) Diego Rubio	4	0	4
2	MF	19	(England) Jack Price	4	0	4
4	DF	13	(United States) Sam Vines	3	0	3
4	MF	21	(Denmark) Younes Namli	3	0	3
6	DF	2	(United States) Keegan Rosenberry	2	0	2
6	FW	9	(France) Nicolas Benezet	2	0	2
8	DF	5	(United States) Auston Trusty	1	0	1
8	MF	10	(United States) Kellyn Acosta	1	0	1
8	MF	18	(United States) Jeremy Kelly	1	0	1
8	MF	20	(Uruguay) Nicolás Mezquida	1	0	1
8	FW	23	(Sierra Leone) Kei Kamara	1	0	1
8	FW	52	(Argentina) Braian Galván	1	0	1
Total				29	0	29

- Last updated: November 22, 2020
- Source: Team Assists

=== Clean sheets ===
Rank	Position	Number	Name	MLS	MLS Cup Playoffs	Total
1	GK	50	(United States) William Yarbrough	4	0	4
Total				4	0	4

- Last updated: November 22, 2020
- Source: Clean Sheets

=== Disciplinary record ===
Rank	No.	Pos.	Player	MLS			MLS Cup Playoffs			Total		
Rank	No.	Pos.	Player	Booked	(yellow card) (yellow-red card)	Sent off (straight red)	Booked	(yellow card) (yellow-red card)	Sent off (straight red)	Booked	(yellow card) (yellow-red card)	Sent off (straight red)
1	6	DF	(Ghana) Lalas Abubakar	5	0	0	1	0	0	6	0	0
2	19	MF	(England) Jack Price	4	0	1	0	0	0	4	0	1
2	10	MF	(United States) Kellyn Acosta	5	0	0	0	0	0	5	0	0
4	11	FW	(Chile) Diego Rubio	3	0	0	0	0	0	3	0	0
5	4	DF	(Scotland) Danny Wilson	1	0	1	0	0	0	1	0	1
5	3	DF	(United States) Drew Moor	2	0	0	0	0	0	2	0	0
5	21	MF	(Denmark) Younes Namli	1	0	0	1	0	0	2	0	0
5	99	FW	(Brazil) Andre Shinyashiki	2	0	0	0	0	0	2	0	0
9	1	GK	(United States) Clint Irwin	1	0	0	0	0	0	1	0	0
9	7	FW	(United States) Jonathan Lewis	1	0	0	0	0	0	1	0	0
9	9	FW	(France) Nicolas Benezet	1	0	0	0	0	0	1	0	0
9	20	MF	(Uruguay) Nicolás Mezquida	1	0	0	0	0	0	1	0	0
9	23	FW	(Sierra Leone) Kei Kamara	1	0	0	0	0	0	1	0	0
9	26	MF	(United States) Cole Bassett	1	0	0	0	0	0	1	0	0
9	32	MF	(United States) Collen Warner	1	0	0	0	0	0	1	0	0
Total				30	0	2	2	0	0	32	0	2

- Last updated: November 22, 2020
- Source: Team Discipline

== Transfers ==
For transfers in, dates listed are when the Rapids officially signed the players to the roster. For transfers out, dates are listed when the Rapids officially removed the players from the roster, not when they signed with another club. If a player later signed with a different club, his new club will be noted, but the date listed remains when he was officially removed from the roster.

=== In ===
Pos.	Player	Transferred from	Fee/notes	Date	Source
DF	(Ghana) Lalas Abubakar	(United States) Columbus Crew SC	Columbus receives $400,000 in allocation money and a 2020 International Roster Spot	November 20, 2019	
DF	(United States) Auston Trusty	(United States) Philadelphia Union	Philadelphia receives $750,000 in allocation money and a sell-on clause	November 20, 2019	
DF	(United States) Drew Moor	(Canada) Toronto FC	Signed to a one–year contract	November 27, 2019	
FW	(France) Nicolas Benezet	(France) Guingamp	Toronto FC receives $50,000 in allocation money and an additional $50,000 in allocation money if Benezet starts 75% of matches in 2020. Guingamp receives a $500,000 transfer fee	January 14, 2020	
MF	(Argentina) Braian Galván	(Argentina) Colón	Will see out remainder of contract with Colón prior to joining the Rapids on a free transfer on July 7, 2020.	January 16, 2020	
GK	(United States) Abraham Rodriguez	(United States) Colorado Springs Switchbacks FC	Signed as a Homegrown Player	February 20, 2020	
DF	(United States) Jeremy Kelly	(United States) North Carolina Tar Heels	Signed to a one–year contract	February 25, 2020	
MF	(United States) Will Vint	(United States) Atlanta United FC	Signed as a Homegrown Player. Atlanta United FC receives a 2022 SuperDraft 4th Round Pick.	March 4, 2020	
MF	(United States) Collen Warner	(Denmark) FC Helsingør	Signed to a one-year contract.	June 30, 2020	
DF	(Iran) Steven Beitashour	(United States) Los Angeles FC	Signed to a one-year contract.	September 19, 2020	

==== Loans in ====
Pos.	Player	Parent club	Length/Notes	Beginning	End	Source
MF	(Denmark) Younes Namli	(Russia) FC Krasnodar	Two-year loan with an option to buy	January 15, 2020	January 15, 2022	
GK	(United States) William Yarbrough	(Mexico) Club León	One–year loan with an option to buy	March 6, 2020	March 6, 2021	

==== SuperDraft ====
Draft picks are not automatically signed to the team roster. Only those who are signed to a contract will be listed as transfers in. Only trades involving draft picks and executed after the start of the 2020 MLS SuperDraft will be listed in the notes.

Date	Player	Position	Previous club	Notes	Ref
January 9, 2020	Jeremy Kelly	DF	North Carolina Tar Heels	MLS SuperDraft 1st Round Pick; Rights acquired from Montreal Impact for $75,000 in allocation money	
January 9, 2020	Robin Afamefuna	DF	Virginia Cavaliers	MLS SuperDraft 2nd Round Pick	

=== Out ===
Pos.	Player	Transferred to	Fee/notes	Date	Source
GK	(United States) Tim Howard	(United States) Memphis 901 FC	Retired. Joined Memphis on March 4, 2020.	October 7, 2019	
DF	(Ghana) Kofi Opare		Contract Option declined	November 21, 2019	
DF	(New Zealand) Tommy Smith	(England) Sunderland	Contract Option declined	November 21, 2019	
DF	(United States) Sam Raben	(United States) Sporting Kansas City II	Contract Option declined	November 21, 2019	
MF	(United States) Dillon Serna	(United States) Sporting Kansas City II	Out of Contract	November 21, 2019	
DF	(Sweden) Axel Sjöberg	(United States) Columbus Crew SC	Waived. Signed for Columbus on December 4, 2019.	November 27, 2019	
FW	(Scotland) Sam Nicholson	(England) Bristol Rovers	Contract terminated by mutual consent. Joined Bristol on July 22, 2020.	July 2, 2020	
FW	(Sierra Leone) Kei Kamara	(United States) Minnesota United FC	Traded for $150,000 in GAM and a second-round pick in the 2022 MLS SuperDraft	September 19, 2020	

==== Loans out ====
Pos.	Player	Loanee club	Length/Notes	Beginning	End	Source
FW	(United States) Niki Jackson	(United States) Colorado Springs Switchbacks FC	Duration of the 2020 USL Championship season Suffered season ending knee injury on February 21	February 21, 2020	October 3, 2020	
DF	(Rwanda) Abdul Rwatubyaye	(United States) Colorado Springs Switchbacks FC	Duration of the 2020 USL Championship season	February 21, 2020	October 3, 2020	
DF	(United States) Sebastian Anderson	(United States) Colorado Springs Switchbacks FC	Duration of the 2020 USL Championship season	February 21, 2020	October 3, 2020	
GK	(United States) Abraham Rodriguez	(United States) Colorado Springs Switchbacks FC	Duration of the 2020 USL Championship season	February 21, 2020	October 3, 2020	
FW	(United States) Matt Hundley	(United States) Memphis 901 FC	Duration of the 2020 USL Championship season	February 21, 2020	October 3, 2020	
MF	(United States) Will Vint	(United States) Colorado Springs Switchbacks FC	Duration of the 2020 USL Championship season	March 6, 2020	October 3, 2020	

== See also ==
- Colorado Rapids
- 2020 in American soccer
- 2020 Major League Soccer season
