= 2019 Colorado Rapids season =

Colorado Rapids
2019 season
- Owner: Stan Kroenke
- Head coach: Anthony Hudson (until May 1); Conor Casey (interim, May 1 – August 25); Robin Fraser (from August 25)
- Major League Soccer: Conference: 9th Overall: 16th
- U.S. Open Cup: Fourth round (knocked out by New Mexico United)
- Top goalscorer: League: Kei Kamara (14); All: Kei Kamara (14)
- Highest home attendance: 16,998 (June 1 vs. Cincinnati)
- Lowest home attendance: 2,619 (June 12 vs. New Mexico, USOC)
- Average home league attendance: 14,284
- Biggest win: 6–3 (August 3 vs. Montreal)
- Biggest defeat: 1–4 (March 30 vs. Houston, April 20 at Chicago)
Home colors	Away colors

The 2019 Colorado Rapids season was the club's twenty-fourth season of existence and their twenty-fourth consecutive season in Major League Soccer (MLS), the top flight of American soccer. Colorado also competed in the U.S. Open Cup. The season covers the period from October 29, 2018 to the start of the 2020 Major League Soccer season.

== Background ==
Colorado finished the 2018 season second-bottom of the Western Conference table, with the third-worst overall record in MLS. The Rapids finished 11th in the Western Conference and 21st in the overall table. The team scored a league-low 36 goals in 34 matches, and conceded 63 goals. Dominique Badji, who was traded to FC Dallas on July 23, led Colorado with seven goals across all competitions.

Outside of MLS play, the Rapids played in the 2018 edition of the U.S. Open Cup, where they lost in the fourth round to Nashville SC. They also played in the 2018 CONCACAF Champions League, where they were eliminated in the Round of 16 by Toronto FC.

== Roster ==
As of match played October 6, 2019

No.	Name	Nationality	Position(s)	Date of birth (age)	Signed in	Previous club	Apps	Goals
Goalkeepers
1	Tim Howard	(United States)	GK	March 6, 1979 (aged 40)	2016	(England) Everton	103	0
15	Andre Rawls	(United States)	GK	December 20, 1991 (aged 27)	2019	(United States) New York City FC	0	0
31	Clint Irwin	(United States)	GK	April 1, 1989 (aged 30)	2019	(Canada) Toronto FC	105	0
Defenders
2	Keegan Rosenberry	(United States)	DF	December 11, 1993 (aged 25)	2019	(United States) Philadelphia Union	35	1
3	Kofi Opare	(Ghana)	DF	October 12, 1990 (aged 28)	2019	(United States) D.C. United	3	0
4	Danny Wilson	(Scotland)	DF	December 27, 1991 (aged 27)	2018	(Scotland) Rangers	45	2
5	Tommy Smith	(New Zealand)	DF	March 31, 1990 (aged 29)	2018	(England) Ipswich Town	64	7
6	Lalas Abubakar	(Ghana)	DF	December 25, 1994 (aged 24)	2019	(United States) Columbus Crew SC (loan)	23	0
13	Sam Vines	(United States)	DF	May 31, 1999 (aged 20)	2018	(United States) Charlotte Independence	28	0
18	Sam Raben	(United States)	DF	May 11, 1997 (aged 22)	2019	(United States) Wake Forest Demon Deacons	0	0
22	Sebastian Anderson	(United States)	DF	August 8, 2002 (aged 17)	2019	(United States) Colorado Rapids Academy	7	1
24	Kortne Ford	(United States)	DF	January 26, 1996 (aged 23)	2017	(United States) Denver Pioneers	38	1
27	Deklan Wynne	(New Zealand)	DF	March 20, 1995 (aged 24)	2018	(Canada) Whitecaps FC 2	39	0
44	Axel Sjöberg	(Sweden)	DF	March 8, 1991 (aged 28)	2015	(United States) Marquette Golden Eagles	95	3
Midfielders
10	Kellyn Acosta	(United States)	MF	July 24, 1995 (aged 24)	2018	(United States) FC Dallas	44	4
17	Dillon Serna	(United States)	MF	March 25, 1994 (aged 25)	2013	(United States) Akron Zips	113	12
19	Jack Price	(England)	MF	December 19, 1992 (aged 26)	2018	(England) Wolverhampton Wanderers	61	2
20	Nicolás Mezquida	(Uruguay)	MF	January 21, 1992 (aged 27)	2019	(Canada) Vancouver Whitecaps FC	33	5
26	Cole Bassett	(United States)	MF	July 28, 2001 (aged 18)	2018	(United States) Colorado Rapids U-23	27	3
28	Sam Nicholson	(Scotland)	MF	January 20, 1995 (aged 24)	2018	(United States) Minnesota United FC	48	4
Forwards
7	Diego Rubio	(Chile)	FW	May 15, 1993 (aged 26)	2019	(United States) Sporting Kansas City	27	12
11	Jonathan Lewis	(United States)	FW	June 4, 1997 (aged 22)	2019	(United States) New York City FC	16	5
12	Niki Jackson	(United States)	FW	August 25, 1995 (aged 24)	2018	(United States) Grand Canyon Antelopes	20	3
23	Kei Kamara	(Sierra Leone)	FW	September 1, 1984 (aged 35)	2019	(Canada) Vancouver Whitecaps FC	29	14
29	Matt Hundley	(United States)	FW	May 11, 2000 (aged 19)	2019	(United States) UCLA Bruins	0	0
99	Andre Shinyashiki	(Brazil)	FW	June 11, 1997 (aged 22)	2019	(United States) Denver Pioneers	31	7
Out on loan
8	Johan Blomberg	(Sweden)	MF	June 14, 1987 (aged 32)	2018	(Sweden) AIK	30	0
14	Abdul Rwatubyaye	(Rwanda)	DF	October 23, 1996 (aged 22)	2019	(United States) Sporting Kansas City	0	0

== Non-competitive ==
=== Preseason ===
February 2 Friendly	FC Cincinnati	1–0	Colorado Rapids	Bradenton, FL
8:30 AM MST	Waston (red card) 21'; Lasso (yellow card) 52', (goal) 59'	Report	Jackson (yellow card) 62'	Stadium: IMG Academy; Attendance: 0

February 9 Friendly	Colorado Rapids	5–0	Ventura County Fusion	Chula Vista, CA
1:00 PM MST	Mezquida 1', 23'; Rubio 8', 11'; Shinyashiki 51'	Report		Stadium: Chula Vista Elite Athlete Training Center; Attendance: 0
Note: Match was played with 30-minute halves.

February 9 Friendly	Colorado Rapids	v	San Diego Toreros	Chula Vista, CA
1:00 PM MST				Stadium: Chula Vista Elite Athlete Training Center
Note: Match was cancelled and was not rescheduled.

February 12 Friendly	Colorado Rapids	0–2	Toronto FC	Chula Vista, CA
4:30 PM MST		Report	Osorio 1'; Boyd 50'	Stadium: Chula Vista Elite Athlete Training Center; Attendance: 0
Note: Match was played with a 30-minute second half.

February 16 Friendly	Las Vegas Lights	0–3	Colorado Rapids	Las Vegas, NV
11:30 AM MST		Report	Gashi 23', 25'; Hundley 24'	Stadium: Cashman Field; Attendance: 0

February 16 Friendly	Las Vegas Lights	2–2	Colorado Rapids	Las Vegas, NV
3:00 PM MST	Hernández 44'; Torres 63'	Report	Serna 45+1'; Mezquida 60'	Stadium: Cashman Field; Attendance: 5,619

February 23 Friendly	LA Galaxy	1–3	Colorado Rapids	Carson, CA
9:00 PM MST	Ibrahimović 77'	Report	Kamara 42'; Rubio 69', 85'	Stadium: Dignity Health Sports Park

February 24 Friendly	LA Galaxy	3–1	Colorado Rapids	Carson, CA
11:30 AM MST	Boateng 40'; 46'; 60'	Report	Jackson 53'	Stadium: Dignity Health Sports Park; Attendance: 0

=== Midseason ===
July 15 Friendly	Colorado Rapids	0–3	Arsenal	Commerce City, CO
7:00 PM MDT		Report	Saka 12'; Olayinka 29'; Martinelli 61'	Stadium: Dick's Sporting Goods Park

== Competitive ==
=== Major League Soccer ===
==== Standings ====
===== Western Conference =====
2019 MLS Western Conference standings
Pos	Team	Pld	W	L	T	GF	GA	GD	Pts	Qualification
7	FC Dallas	34	13	12	9	48	46	+2	48	Qualification for the first round
8	San Jose Earthquakes	34	13	16	5	51	52	−1	44	
9	Colorado Rapids	34	12	16	6	57	60	−3	42	
10	Houston Dynamo	34	12	18	4	45	57	−12	40	
11	Sporting Kansas City	34	10	16	8	49	67	−18	38	

Source: MLS
Rules for classification: 1) points; 2) total wins; 3) total goal differential; 4) total goals scored; 5) disciplinary points; 6) away goal differential; 7) away goals scored; 8) home goals scored; 9) home goal differential; 10) coin toss or drawing of lots

===== Overall table =====
2019 MLS regular season standings
Pos	Team	Pld	W	L	T	GF	GA	GD	Pts	
14	New England Revolution	34	11	11	12	50	57	−7	45	
15	San Jose Earthquakes	34	13	16	5	52	55	−3	44	
16	Colorado Rapids	34	12	16	6	58	63	−5	42	
17	Chicago Fire	34	10	12	12	55	47	+8	42	
18	Montreal Impact (V)	34	12	17	5	47	60	−13	41	Qualification for the CONCACAF Champions League

Source: MLS
Rules for classification: 1) points; 2) total wins; 3) total goal differential; 4) total goals scored; 5) disciplinary points; 6) away goals scored; 7) away goal differential; 8) coin toss or drawing of lots
(V) Canadian Championship winners

==== Results summary ====
Overall								Home						Away					
Pld	Pts	W	L	T	GF	GA	GD	W	L	T	GF	GA	GD	W	L	T	GF	GA	GD
34	42	12	16	6	58	63	−5	9	6	2	36	29	+7	3	10	4	22	34	−12

Source: MLS standings
Pld = Matches played; Pts = Points; W = Matches won; T = Matches tied; L = Matches lost; GF = Goals for; GA = Goals against; GD = Goal difference

==== Results by round ====
Round	1	2	3	4	5	6	8	9	10	11	12	13	14	15	16	17	18	19	20	21	22	23	24	25	26	27	28	29	7	30	31	32	33	34
Stadium	H	A	H	A	H	A	H	A	A	H	H	A	H	A	H	H	A	H	H	A	H	A	H	H	A	A	A	A	H	H	A	A	H	A
Result	D	L	D	L	L	L	L	L	L	L	L	W	W	D	W	W	D	W	L	D	L	L	W	W	L	D	L	W	W	W	L	W	W	L

Source: Colorado schedule
A = Away; H = Home; W = Win; D = Draw; L = Loss

==== Match results ====
March 2 1	Colorado Rapids	3–3	Portland Timbers	Commerce City, CO
4:00 PM MST	Kamara 16'; Sjöberg (red card) 27'; Feilhaber 46'; Shinyashiki 90+4'	Report	Chará (yellow card) 18'; Valeri 29'; Cascante (yellow card) 32'; Blanco 45+1'; Wynne 66' (o.g.)	Stadium: Dick's Sporting Goods Park; Attendance: 12,717; Referee: Drew Fischer

March 9 2	Seattle Sounders FC	2–0	Colorado Rapids	Seattle, WA
8:00 PM MST	Leerdam 5', (yellow card) 65'; Ruidíaz 8'; Svensson (yellow card) 25'; Morris (yellow card) 52'; Roldan (yellow card) 59'; Lodeiro (yellow card) 90+3'	Report	Rosenberry (yellow card) 17'; Feilhaber (yellow card) 33'	Stadium: CenturyLink Field; Attendance: 37,725; Referee: Baldomero Toledo

March 17 3	Colorado Rapids	1–1	Sporting Kansas City	Commerce City, CO
7:00 PM MDT	Kamara (yellow card) 53'; Rubio 54', (yellow card) 72'; Feilhaber (yellow card) 60'; Blomberg (yellow card) 80' (yellow-red card) 87'	Report	Gutiérrez (yellow card) 41'; Espinoza (yellow card) 64'; Baráth (yellow card) 75'; Russell 88'	Stadium: Dick's Sporting Goods Park; Attendance: 11,037; Referee: Allen Chapman

March 23 4	FC Dallas	2–1	Colorado Rapids	Frisco, TX
3:55 PM MDT	Barrios 35', (yellow card) 76'; Hollingshead 82'; González (yellow card) 86'	Report	Smith 69'; Price (yellow card) 88'	Stadium: Toyota Stadium; Attendance: 14,514; Referee: Chris Penso

March 30 5	Colorado Rapids	1–4	Houston Dynamo	Commerce City, CO
7:00 PM MDT	Rubio (yellow card) 40'; Feilhaber (yellow card) 75'; Kamara 81' (pen.); Smith (red card) 89'	Report	Rodríguez 4'; Sjöberg 15' (o.g.); Rosenberry 34' (o.g.); Figueroa (yellow card) 59'; Elis 67'; DeLaGarza (yellow card) 87'; Lundqvist (yellow card) 90+2'	Stadium: Dick's Sporting Goods Park; Attendance: 11,061; Referee: Marcos de Oliveira

April 6 6	Orlando City SC	4–3	Colorado Rapids	Orlando, FL
5:30 PM MDT	Nani 31', 89' (pen.); Akindele 33'; Mueller 81'	Report	Kamara 9', (yellow card) 39'; Mezquida 61'; Bassett 71'	Stadium: Orlando City Stadium; Attendance: 22,450; Referee: Jair Marrufo

April 10 7	Colorado Rapids	v	Seattle Sounders FC	Commerce City, CO
7:00 PM MDT				Stadium: Dick's Sporting Goods Park
Note: The match was postponed prior to kickoff due to inclement weather.

April 13 8	Colorado Rapids	2–3	D.C. United	Commerce City, CO
7:00 PM MDT	Feilhaber 11'; Price (yellow card) 36'; Kamara (yellow card) 49', (goal) 66'; Acosta (yellow card) 82'	Report	Acosta 35'; Durkin 38'; Rodríguez 43'; Birnbaum (yellow card) 76'	Stadium: Dick's Sporting Goods Park; Attendance: 15,094; Referee: Ted Unkel

April 20 9	Chicago Fire	4–1	Colorado Rapids	Bridgeview, IL
11:00 AM MDT	Nikolić 34'; Sapong 53'; Mihailovic 61'; Katai 80'; Adams (yellow card) 84'	Report	Rubio (yellow card) 31'; Kamara 40'; Price (red card) 88'	Stadium: SeatGeek Stadium; Attendance: 12,967; Referee: David Gantar

April 27 10	Atlanta United FC	1–0	Colorado Rapids	Atlanta, GA
4:00 PM MDT	Gressel 74'	Report	Nicholson (yellow card) 35'; Wilson (yellow card) 45+1'; Acosta (yellow card) 90+6'	Stadium: Mercedes-Benz Stadium; Attendance: 43,005; Referee: Alan Kelly

May 3 11	Colorado Rapids	2–3	Vancouver Whitecaps FC	Commerce City, CO
7:00 PM MDT	Kamara 38' (pen.), 53' (pen.); Rubio (red card) 77'; Acosta (yellow card) 89'	Report	Montero 16'; Venuto 26'; Adnan (yellow card) 73'; Henry (yellow card) 77'; Rose 87'	Stadium: Dick's Sporting Goods Park; Attendance: 10,794; Referee: Alex Chilowicz

May 11 12	Colorado Rapids	2–3	Real Salt Lake	Commerce City, CO
7:00 PM MDT	Wilson (yellow card) 32', (goal) 47'; Acosta 45+3'; Anderson (yellow card) 64'	Report	Rusnák 25' (pen.); Baird 27'; Glad (yellow card) 35'; Johnson 53'; Kreilach (yellow card) 76'	Stadium: Dick's Sporting Goods Park; Attendance: 15,437; Referee: Robert Sibiga

May 19 13	LA Galaxy	0–1	Colorado Rapids	Carson, CA
6:00 PM MDT	Corona (yellow card) 34'; Polenta (yellow card) 43'; Álvarez (yellow card) 90+1'	Report	Lewis (yellow card) 38'; Shinyashiki 82'	Stadium: Dignity Health Sports Park; Attendance: 19,015; Referee: Drew Fischer

May 25 14	Colorado Rapids	3–2	Columbus Crew SC	Commerce City, CO
7:00 PM MDT	Smith 23'; Lewis 45+7'; Price (yellow card) 56'; Mezquida 89', (yellow card) 90'	Report	P. Santos 28'; Sauro (yellow card) 50'; Zardes 54'; Hansen (yellow card) 85'	Stadium: Dick's Sporting Goods Park; Attendance: 16,843; Referee: Baldomero Toledo

May 29 15	Philadelphia Union	1–1	Colorado Rapids	Chester, PA
5:30 PM MDT	Santos 26'; Elliott (yellow card) 86'	Report	Abubakar (yellow card) 50'; Rubio (yellow card) 58'; Lewis 72'	Stadium: Talen Energy Stadium; Attendance: 14,207; Referee: Tim Ford

June 1 16	Colorado Rapids	3–1	FC Cincinnati	Commerce City, CO
6:30 PM MDT	Shinyashiki 43'; Mezquida 73'; Rubio 82'	Report	Manneh 72'	Stadium: Dick's Sporting Goods Park; Attendance: 16,998; Referee: Ted Unkel

June 8 17	Colorado Rapids	1–0	Minnesota United FC	Commerce City, CO
7:00 PM MDT	Shinyashiki (yellow card) 26'; Kamara 29'; Mezquida (yellow card) 90+1'; Acosta (yellow card) 90+5'	Report	Gasper (yellow card) 69'; Quintero (yellow card) 78'	Stadium: Dick's Sporting Goods Park; Attendance: 14,160; Referee: Ramy Touchan

June 22 18	Vancouver Whitecaps FC	2–2	Colorado Rapids	Vancouver, BC
8:00 PM MDT	Montero 45+1' (pen.); Erice (yellow card) 61'; Reyna 80'	Report	Rubio 8'; Shinyashiki 20', (yellow card) 54'; Kamara (yellow card) 27'; Acosta (yellow card) 90+1'; Abubakar (yellow card) 90+5'	Stadium: BC Place; Attendance: 19,893; Referee: Fotis Bazakos

June 28 19	Colorado Rapids	1–0	Los Angeles FC	Commerce City, CO
8:00 PM MDT	Wilson 49'; Price (yellow card) 73'; Bassett (yellow card) 75'; Mezquida (yellow card) 85'	Report	Nguyen (yellow card) 58'; Blackmon (yellow card) 61'	Stadium: Dick's Sporting Goods Park; Attendance: 15,968; Referee: David Gantar

July 4 20	Colorado Rapids	1–2	New England Revolution	Commerce City, CO
7:00 PM MDT	Wilson (yellow card) 36'; Vines (yellow card) 54'; Rubio 71'; Smith (yellow card) 72'; Abubakar (yellow card) 81'; Acosta (yellow card) 90+1' (yellow-red card) 90+1'	Report	Bunbury 8'; L. Caicedo (yellow card) 40'; J. Caicedo 52'; Turner (yellow card) 71'; Delamea (yellow card) 78'; Gil (yellow card) 81'	Stadium: Dick's Sporting Goods Park; Attendance: 15,584; Referee: Alex Chilowicz

July 13 21	Portland Timbers	2–2	Colorado Rapids	Portland, OR
9:00 PM MDT	Valeri (yellow card) 21', (goal) 63' (pen.); Smith 27' (o.g.); Cascante (red card) 55'; Zambrano (yellow card) 77'; Ebobisse (yellow card) 89'	Report	Smith (yellow card) 22'; Lewis 28'; Rubio (yellow card) 59'; Nicholson 76'	Stadium: Providence Park; Attendance: 25,218; Referee: Kevin Stott

July 20 22	Colorado Rapids	1–2	New York City FC	Commerce City, CO
7:00 PM MDT	Anderson 6', (red card) 33'; Howard (yellow card) 36'	Report	Héber 40'; Mitriță 83'; Matarrita (yellow card) 90+1'; Johnson (yellow card) 90+3'	Stadium: Dick's Sporting Goods Park; Attendance: 15,359; Referee: Chris Penso

July 27 23	San Jose Earthquakes	3–1	Colorado Rapids	San Jose, CA
8:00 PM MDT	Abubakar 2' (o.g.); Qazaishvili 34'; Lima (yellow card) 51'; Judson (yellow card) 66'; Thompson (yellow card) 68'; Salinas 83'	Report	Kamara (yellow card) 24'; Lewis (yellow card) 59'; Wilson (yellow card) 70'; Rubio 88'	Stadium: Avaya Stadium; Attendance: 17,762; Referee: Baldomero Toledo

August 3 24	Colorado Rapids	6–3	Montreal Impact	Commerce City, CO
7:00 PM MDT	Bush 21' (o.g.); Kamara 36' (pen.), 45+1', 90'; Rubio 45+4'; Abubakar (yellow card) 56'; Acosta (yellow card) 75'; Shinyashiki 78'	Report	Kamara 18' (o.g.); Urruti 55'; Taïder 76' (pen.); Krolicki (yellow card) 83'	Stadium: Dick's Sporting Goods Park; Attendance: 14,007; Referee: Marcos de Oliveira

August 10 25	Colorado Rapids	2–1	San Jose Earthquakes	Commerce City, CO
7:00 PM MDT	Acosta 44'; Rubio 73', (yellow card) 78'; Price (yellow card) 90'	Report	Judson (yellow card) 55'; Qazaishvili 62'; Yueill (yellow card) 77'	Stadium: Dick's Sporting Goods Park; Attendance: 13,870; Referee: Timothy Ford

August 14 26	Minnesota United FC	1–0	Colorado Rapids	Saint Paul, MN
6:00 PM MDT	Quintero 39'; Gasper (yellow card) 60'; Boxall (yellow card) 83'	Report	Acosta (yellow card) 45'	Stadium: Allianz Field; Attendance: 19,629; Referee: Drew Fischer

August 17 27	Houston Dynamo	2–2	Colorado Rapids	Houston, TX
7:00 PM MDT	Lundkvist (yellow card) 2'; Manotas 74', 79'	Report	Rubio 7', 38'; Price (yellow card) 25'; Smith (yellow card) 76'; Vines (yellow card) 81'	Stadium: BBVA Compass Stadium; Attendance: 15,458; Referee: Ismail Elfath

August 24 28	Real Salt Lake	2–0	Colorado Rapids	Sandy, UT
8:00 PM MDT	Lennon (yellow card) 8'; Beckerman (yellow card) 74'; Plata 90+6' (pen.); Savarino 90+9'	Report	Rubio (yellow card) 48'; Rosenberry (yellow card) 73'; Acosta (yellow card) 80'; Abubakar (yellow card) 87'; Kamara (red card) 89'	Stadium: Rio Tinto Stadium; Attendance: 20,384; Referee: Ted Unkel

August 31 29	New York Red Bulls	0–2	Colorado Rapids	Harrison, NJ
5:00 PM MDT	Lawrence (yellow card) 42'; Buckmaster (yellow card) 80'	Report	Price (yellow card) 12'; Lewis 14', 87'; Mezquida (yellow card) 81'; Rubio (yellow card) 90+3'	Stadium: Red Bull Arena; Attendance: 17,089; Referee: Rubiel Vazquez

September 7 7	Colorado Rapids	2–0	Seattle Sounders FC	Commerce City, CO
7:00 PM MDT	Shinyashiki 41', 70'	Report	Cecchini (yellow card) 79'	Stadium: Dick's Sporting Goods Park; Attendance: 16,607; Referee: Kevin Stott
Note: The match was postponed prior to kickoff on April 10 due to inclement weather.

September 11 30	Colorado Rapids	2–1	LA Galaxy	Commerce City, CO
7:00 PM MDT	Bassett 79'; Mezquida 85' (pen.); Price (yellow card) 89'; Shinyashiki (yellow card) 90+7'	Report	Skjelvik (yellow card) 38'; Steres (yellow card) 79'; González 82'; Pavón (yellow card) 90+6'	Stadium: Dick's Sporting Goods Park; Attendance: 10,945; Referee: Fotis Bazakos

September 15 31	Toronto FC	3–2	Colorado Rapids	Toronto, ON
3:00 PM MDT	Endoh 8'; Pozuelo 13' (pen.); Altidore (yellow card) 59'; Osorio 70'; Mavinga (yellow card) 74'	Report	Abubakar (yellow card) 10'; Rosenberry 31'; Nicholson 62'; Rubio (yellow card) 64'	Stadium: BMO Field; Attendance: 24,810; Referee: Alex Chilowicz

September 21 32	Sporting Kansas City	2–3	Colorado Rapids	Kansas City, KS
6:30 PM MDT	Gerso 3'; Besler (yellow card) 8' (yellow-red card) 20'; Smith 14' (o.g.); Martins (yellow card) 30'	Report	Nicholson (yellow card) 18'; Kamara 42'; Rosenberry (yellow card) 43'; Rubio 76', (yellow card) 83'; Smith 85'; Abubakar (yellow card) 90+4'	Stadium: Children's Mercy Park; Attendance: 18,862; Referee: Nima Saghafi

September 29 33	Colorado Rapids	3–0	FC Dallas	Commerce City, CO
5:30 PM MDT	Price 10'; Rubio 45+4'; Kamara 72'	Report		Stadium: Dick's Sporting Goods Park; Attendance: 16,352; Referee: Chris Penso

October 6 34	Los Angeles FC	3–1	Colorado Rapids	Los Angeles, CA
2:00 PM MDT	Vela 28', 31', 51'; Harvey (yellow card) 58'; Kaye (yellow card) 73'; Nguyen (yellow card) 90+1'	Report	Kamara 40'; Price (yellow card) 62'	Stadium: Banc of California Stadium; Attendance: 22,537; Referee: Robert Sibiga

=== U.S. Open Cup ===
June 12 Fourth round	Colorado Rapids	2–2 (a.e.t.) (2–4 p)	New Mexico United	Commerce City, CO
7:00 PM MDT	Sjöberg (yellow card) 24' (yellow-red card) 72'; Rubio 35'; Blomberg (yellow card) 43'; Rosenberry (yellow card) 44'; Mezquida 46'; Acosta (yellow card) 88'; Wilson (yellow card) 89'	Report	Sandoval 3'; Hamilton (yellow card) 34'; Sampson (yellow card) 38'; Wehan (yellow card) 45'; Frater 90+4'; Moar (yellow card) 92'; Guzman (yellow card) 103'	Stadium: Dick's Sporting Goods Park; Attendance: 2,619; Referee: Malik Badawi
	Penalties
	Acosta (penalty scored); Wilson (penalty missed); Rosenberry (penalty scored); Nicholson (penalty missed)		(penalty scored) Frater; (penalty scored) Moar; (penalty scored) Sandoval; (penalty scored) Wehan

== Statistics ==
=== Appearances and goals ===
No.	Pos	Nat	Player	Total		MLS		U.S. Open Cup	
No.	Pos	Nat	Player	Apps	Goals	Apps	Goals	Apps	Goals
1	GK	(United States) USA	Tim Howard	25	0	25	0	0	0
2	DF	(United States) USA	Keegan Rosenberry	35	1	34	1	1	0
3	DF	(Ghana) GHA	Kofi Opare	3	0	3	0	0	0
4	DF	(Scotland) SCO	Danny Wilson	21	2	15+5	2	1	0
5	DF	(New Zealand) NZL	Tommy Smith	28	3	27	3	0+1	0
6	DF	(Ghana) GHA	Lalas Abubakar	23	0	22	0	1	0
7	FW	(Chile) CHI	Diego Rubio	27	12	25+1	11	1	1
8	MF	(Sweden) SWE	Johan Blomberg	4	0	1+2	0	1	0
10	MF	(United States) USA	Kellyn Acosta	32	2	30+1	2	0+1	0
11	FW	(United States) USA	Jonathan Lewis	16	5	10+6	5	0	0
12	FW	(United States) USA	Niki Jackson	4	0	0+4	0	0	0
13	DF	(United States) USA	Sam Vines	27	0	23+3	0	0+1	0
14	DF	(Rwanda) RWA	Abdul Rwatubyaye	0	0	0	0	0	0
15	GK	(United States) USA	Andre Rawls	0	0	0	0	0	0
17	MF	(United States) USA	Dillon Serna	15	0	6+8	0	1	0
18	DF	(United States) USA	Sam Raben	0	0	0	0	0	0
19	MF	(England) ENG	Jack Price	27	1	25+2	1	0	0
20	MF	(Uruguay) URU	Nicolás Mezquida	33	5	11+21	4	1	1
22	DF	(United States) USA	Sebastian Anderson	7	1	5+1	1	1	0
23	FW	(Sierra Leone) SLE	Kei Kamara	29	14	29	14	0	0
24	DF	(United States) USA	Kortne Ford	0	0	0	0	0	0
26	MF	(United States) USA	Cole Bassett	21	2	14+6	2	1	0
27	DF	(New Zealand) NZL	Deklan Wynne	11	0	11	0	0	0
28	MF	(Scotland) SCO	Sam Nicholson	28	2	19+8	2	0+1	0
29	FW	(United States) USA	Matt Hundley	0	0	0	0	0	0
31	GK	(United States) USA	Clint Irwin	12	0	9+2	0	1	0
44	DF	(Sweden) SWE	Axel Sjöberg	8	0	5+2	0	1	0
99	FW	(Brazil) BRA	Andre Shinyashiki	31	7	18+13	7	0	0
Players who left Colorado during the season:
6	MF	(United States) USA	Benny Feilhaber	9	2	7+2	2	0	0
21	MF	(Ghana) GHA	Bismark Adjei-Boateng	0	0	0	0	0	0

Source: Colorado stats

=== Disciplinary record ===
No.	Pos.	Name	MLS		U.S. Open Cup		Total	
No.	Pos.	Name	Yellow card	Red card	Yellow card	Red card	Yellow card	Red card
1	GK	(United States) Tim Howard	1	0	0	0	1	0
2	DF	(United States) Keegan Rosenberry	3	0	1	0	4	0
4	DF	(Scotland) Danny Wilson	4	0	1	0	5	0
5	DF	(New Zealand) Tommy Smith	3	1	0	0	3	1
6	DF	(Ghana) Lalas Abubakar	7	0	0	0	7	0
7	FW	(Chile) Diego Rubio	10	1	0	0	10	1
8	MF	(Sweden) Johan Blomberg	1	1	1	0	2	1
10	MF	(United States) Kellyn Acosta	8	1	1	0	9	1
11	FW	(United States) Jonathan Lewis	2	0	0	0	2	0
13	DF	(United States) Sam Vines	2	0	0	0	2	0
19	MF	(England) Jack Price	9	1	0	0	9	1
20	MF	(Uruguay) Nicolás Mezquida	4	0	0	0	4	0
22	DF	(United States) Sebastian Anderson	1	1	0	0	1	1
23	FW	(Sierra Leone) Kei Kamara	5	1	0	0	5	1
26	MF	(United States) Cole Bassett	1	0	0	0	1	0
28	MF	(Scotland) Sam Nicholson	2	0	0	0	2	0
44	DF	(Sweden) Axel Sjöberg	0	1	0	1	0	2
99	FW	(Brazil) Andre Shinyashiki	3	0	0	0	3	0
Players who left Colorado during the season:
6	MF	(United States) Benny Feilhaber	3	0	0	0	3	0

Source: Colorado stats

=== Clean sheets ===
No.	Name	MLS	U.S. Open Cup	Total	Games Played		
No.	Name	1	(United States) Tim Howard	5	0	5	25
15	(United States) Andre Rawls	0	0	0	0		
31	(United States) Clint Irwin	1	0	1	12		

Source: Colorado stats

== Transfers ==
=== In ===
Pos.	Player	Transferred from	Fee/notes	Date	Source
MF	(Uruguay) Nicolás Mezquida	(Canada) Vancouver Whitecaps FC	Vancouver receives GK Zac MacMath.	Dec 9, 2018	
FW	(Sierra Leone) Kei Kamara	(United States) FC Cincinnati	Cincinnati receives a 2019 International Roster Spot.	Dec 11, 2018	
GK	(United States) Andre Rawls	(United States) New York City FC	Selected in Stage One of the 2018 MLS Re-Entry Draft.	Dec 14, 2018	
GK	(United States) Clint Irwin	(Canada) Toronto FC	Toronto receives a second round pick in the 2019 MLS SuperDraft.	Dec 14, 2018	
FW	(Chile) Diego Rubio	(United States) Sporting Kansas City	SKC receives MF Kelyn Rowe, $300,000 in allocation money.	Dec 18, 2018	
DF	(United States) Keegan Rosenberry	(United States) Philadelphia Union	Philadelphia receives $300,000 in allocation monies, future considerations.	Dec 19, 2018	
MF	(United States) Benny Feilhaber	(United States) Los Angeles FC	Signed to a one-year contract with a club option for 2020.	Jan 11, 2019	
FW	(Brazil) Andre Shinyashiki	(United States) Denver Pioneers	Selected in the First Round of the 2019 MLS SuperDraft.	Jan 11, 2019	
FW	(United States) Matt Hundley	(United States) UCLA Bruins	Signed as a Homegrown Player.	Jan 15, 2019	
DF	(United States) Sam Raben	(United States) Wake Forest Demon Deacons	Signed as a Homegrown Player.	Jan 15, 2019	
DF	(Ghana) Kofi Opare	(United States) D.C. United	Signed to a one-year contract.	Feb 25, 2019	
DF	(United States) Sebastian Anderson	(United States) Colorado Rapids Academy	Signed as a Homegrown Player.	Apr 3, 2019	
FW	(United States) Jonathan Lewis	(United States) New York City FC	NYCFC receives $650,000 in targeted allocation money, a 2020 International Roster Spot.	May 8, 2019	
DF	(Rwanda) Abdul Rwatubyaye	(United States) Sporting Kansas City	SKC receives MF Benny Feilhaber.	May 8, 2019	

==== SuperDraft ====
The following players were selected by Colorado in the MLS SuperDraft, but did not sign a contract with the club.

Pos.	Player	College	Notes	Date	Source
DF	(United States) Marcello Borges	(United States) Michigan Wolverines	Selected in the second round of the 2019 MLS SuperDraft. Signed for (United States) Detroit City for the NPSL Members Cup.	Jan 11, 2019	
DF	(United States) Jacob Hauser-Ramsey	(United States) UConn Huskies	Selected in the second round of the 2019 MLS SuperDraft. Signed for (United States) Memphis 901 on Mar 21, 2019.	Jan 11, 2019	
MF	(United States) Robbie Mertz	(United States) Michigan Wolverines	Selected in the Fourth Round of the 2019 MLS SuperDraft. Signed for (United States) Pittsburgh Riverhounds SC on Mar 29, 2019.	Jan 14, 2019	

=== Loan in ===
Pos.	Player	Parent club	Length/Notes	Beginning	End	Source
DF	(Ghana) Lalas Abubakar	(United States) Columbus Crew SC	Remainder of the 2019 Major League Soccer season. Columbus receives $125,000 in targeted allocation money.	May 8, 2019		

=== Out ===
Pos.	Player	Transferred to	Fee/notes	Date	Source
MF	(Jamaica) Giles Barnes	(India) Hyderabad FC	Contract option declined. Signed for Hyderabad on Oct 9, 2019.	Nov 27, 2018	
FW	(Ivory Coast) Yannick Boli	(Thailand) Ratchaburi Mitr Phol	Contract expired. Signed for Ratchaburi on Dec 11, 2018.	Nov 27, 2018	
FW	(United States) Caleb Calvert	(United States) Saint Louis FC	Contract option declined. Signed for Saint Louis on Dec 22, 2018.	Nov 27, 2018	
DF	(New Zealand) Kip Colvey		Contract option declined. Retired.	Nov 27, 2018	
DF	(United States) Mike da Fonte	(United States) OKC Energy	Contract option declined. Signed for OKC on Mar 28, 2019.	Nov 27, 2018	
GK	(United States) Andrew Dykstra		Contract expired. Retired	Nov 27, 2018	
MF	(United States) Sam Hamilton	(United States) New Mexico United	Contract option declined. Signed for New Mexico on Nov 28, 2018.	Nov 27, 2018	
MF	(Uruguay) Enzo Martínez	(United States) Charlotte Independence	Contract option declined. Signed for Charlotte on Dec 20, 2018.	Nov 27, 2018	
FW	(United States) Jack McBean		Contract option declined. Retired.	Nov 27, 2018	
MF	(Mexico) Ricardo Pérez	(United States) Lansing Ignite	Contract option declined. Signed for Lansing on Mar 13, 2019.	Nov 27, 2018	
GK	(United States) Zac MacMath	(Canada) Vancouver Whitecaps FC	Colorado receives MF Nicolás Mezquida, $100,000 in targeted allocation money.	Dec 9, 2018	
DF	(United States) Edgar Castillo	(United States) New England Revolution	Colorado receives MF Kelyn Rowe.	Dec 18, 2018	
MF	(United States) Marlon Hairston	(United States) Houston Dynamo	Colorado receives $175,000 in general allocation money.	Jan 11, 2019	
FW	(Albania) Shkëlzen Gashi	(Switzerland) FC Aarau	Waived. Signed for Aarau on Jul 12, 2019.	Mar 1, 2019	
MF	(United States) Benny Feilhaber	(United States) Sporting Kansas City	Colorado receives DF Abdul Rwatubyaye, a 2019 International Roster Spot, $50,000 in targeted allocation money, a second round pick in the 2020 MLS SuperDraft, future considerations.	May 8, 2019	
MF	(Ghana) Bismark Adjei-Boateng	(Finland) Kuopion Palloseura	Contract terminated by mutual consent. Signed for Kuopion Palloseura on Dec 12, 2019.	Jul 12, 2019	

=== Loan out ===
Pos.	Player	Loanee club	Length/Notes	Beginning	End	Source
DF	(United States) Sam Raben	(United States) Colorado Springs Switchbacks	Duration of the 2019 USL Championship season.	Feb 18, 2019	Mar 9, 2019	
DF	(United States) Sam Raben	(United States) Colorado Springs Switchbacks	Duration of the 2019 USL Championship season.	Mar 16, 2019	Sep 7, 2019	
FW	(United States) Matt Hundley	(United States) Colorado Springs Switchbacks	Duration of the 2019 USL Championship season.	Mar 6, 2019	Sep 7, 2019	
GK	(United States) Andre Rawls	(United States) Colorado Springs Switchbacks	Duration of the 2019 USL Championship season.	Mar 6, 2019	Mar 15, 2019	
GK	(United States) Andre Rawls	(United States) Colorado Springs Switchbacks	Duration of the 2019 USL Championship season.	Mar 23, 2019	May 29, 2019	
GK	(United States) Andre Rawls	(United States) Colorado Springs Switchbacks	Duration of the 2019 USL Championship season.	Jun 1, 2019	Jul 27, 2019	
GK	(United States) Andre Rawls	(United States) Colorado Springs Switchbacks	Duration of the 2019 USL Championship season.	Aug 31, 2019	Sep 7, 2019	
GK	(United States) Clint Irwin	(United States) Colorado Springs Switchbacks	One game.	Mar 15, 2019	Mar 23, 2019	
GK	(United States) Clint Irwin	(United States) Colorado Springs Switchbacks	One game.	Apr 24, 2019	Apr 27, 2019	
GK	(United States) Clint Irwin	(United States) Colorado Springs Switchbacks	One game.	May 4, 2019	May 11, 2019	
DF	(Ghana) Kofi Opare	(United States) Colorado Springs Switchbacks	One game.	Mar 15, 2019	Apr 6, 2019	
FW	(United States) Niki Jackson	(United States) Charlotte Independence	Duration of the 2019 USL Championship season.	Apr 12, 2019	Aug 31, 2019	
FW	(Brazil) Andre Shinyashiki	(United States) Colorado Springs Switchbacks	One game.	Apr 24, 2019	Apr 27, 2019	
FW	(Brazil) Andre Shinyashiki	(United States) Colorado Springs Switchbacks	One game.	May 4, 2019	May 11, 2019	
DF	(Rwanda) Abdul Rwatubyaye	(United States) Colorado Springs Switchbacks	Remainder of the 2019 USL Championship season.	May 17, 2019		
MF	(Sweden) Johan Blomberg	(Sweden) GIF Sundsvall	Remainder of his contract.	Aug 13, 2019		
DF	(United States) Sebastian Anderson	(United States) Colorado Springs Switchbacks	Remainder of the 2019 Major League Soccer season.	Aug 23, 2019	Aug 27, 2019	
MF	(United States) Cole Bassett	(United States) Colorado Springs Switchbacks	Remainder of the 2019 Major League Soccer season.	Aug 23, 2019	Aug 27, 2019	

== Awards ==
MLS Team of the Week
Week	Starters	Bench	Opponent(s)	Link
1	(United States) Benny Feilhaber (United States) Tim Howard		Portland Timbers	
6		(United States) Cole Bassett	Orlando City SC	
7		(United States) Benny Feilhaber	D.C. United	
12		(United States) Jonathan Lewis	LA Galaxy	
13	(Scotland) Sam Nicholson		Columbus Crew SC	
14	(Brazil) Andre Shinyashiki		Philadelphia Union; FC Cincinnati	
15	(Ghana) Lalas Abubakar (United States) Tim Howard (Sierra Leone) Kei Kamara	(England) Jack Price	Minnesota United FC	
16	(Ghana) Lalas Abubakar (Sierra Leone) Kei Kamara		Vancouver Whitecaps FC	
17	(United States) Sam Vines		Los Angeles FC	
22	(Sierra Leone) Kei Kamara (England) Jack Price		Montreal Impact	
23	(United States) Keegan Rosenberry	(Chile) Diego Rubio	San Jose Earthquakes	
24		(Chile) Diego Rubio	Minnesota United FC; Houston Dynamo	
26	(United States) Jonathan Lewis (New Zealand) Tommy Smith		New York Red Bulls	
27	(Brazil) Andre Shinyashiki (United States) Sam Vines	(United States) Keegan Rosenberry	Seattle Sounders FC	
28	(United States) Keegan Rosenberry		LA Galaxy; Toronto FC	
29	(England) Jack Price	(Sierra Leone) Kei Kamara (New Zealand) Tommy Smith	Sporting Kansas City	
30	(Sierra Leone) Kei Kamara	(United States) Sam Vines	FC Dallas	

MLS Goal of the Week
Week	Player	Opponent	Link
1	(Brazil) Andre Shinyashiki	Portland Timbers	

MLS Player of the Week
Week	Player	Opponent	Link
27	(Brazil) Andre Shinyashiki	Seattle Sounders FC	

== Kits ==
Home	Away	Specialty

Type	Shirt	Shorts	Socks	First appearance / Record
Home	Burgundy	Blue	Burgundy	Match 1 vs. Portland / 9–10–5
Away	White	White	White	Match 4 vs. Dallas / 3–6–1
Specialty	Teal	Teal	Teal	Match 8 vs. Chicago / 0–1–0

== See also ==
- Colorado Rapids
- 2019 in American soccer
- 2019 Major League Soccer season
