= 2021 Colorado Rapids season =

Colorado Rapids
2021 season
- Owner: Stan Kroenke
- Head coach: Robin Fraser
- Major League Soccer: Conference: 1st Overall: 2nd
- MLS Cup playoffs: Conference semifinals
- Top goalscorer: League: Michael Barrios (8); All: Michael Barrios (8)
- Biggest win: COL 3–0 DAL (May 29th); COL 5–2 LAFC (November 7th)
- Biggest defeat: RSL 3–0 COL (July 24th); SEA 3–0 COL (October 3rd)
Home colors	Away colors

The 2021 Colorado Rapids season was the club's twenty-sixth season of existence and their twenty-sixth consecutive season in Major League Soccer (MLS), the top flight of American soccer.

== Background ==
Colorado finished the 2020 season 5th in the Western Conference table, and 10th overall in MLS. Jonathan Lewis and Cole Bassett lead Colorado with 5 goals across all competitions. Outside of MLS play, the Rapids played in the MLS is Back Tournament, getting knocked out in the group stage. They were also scheduled to compete in the U.S. Open Cup before its cancellation due to the COVID-19 pandemic.

== Roster ==
As of August 6, 2021

Note: Flags indicate national team as defined under FIFA eligibility rules; some limited exceptions apply. Players may hold more than one non-FIFA nationality.

No.	Pos.	Nation	Player
1	GK	USA	Clint Irwin
2	DF	USA	Keegan Rosenberry
3	DF	USA	Drew Moor
4	DF	SCO	Danny Wilson
5	DF	USA	Auston Trusty
6	DF	GHA	Lalas Abubakar
7	FW	USA	Jonathan Lewis
8	FW	SEN	Dominique Badji
9	FW	BRA	Andre Shinyashiki
11	FW	CHI	Diego Rubio
12	FW	COL	Michael Barrios
14	MF	CAN	Mark-Anthony Kaye
16	MF	USA	Will Vint (HGP)
19	MF	ENG	Jack Price (captain)

No.	Pos.	Nation	Player
20	MF	URU	Nicolás Mezquida
21	MF	DEN	Younes Namli (DP)
22	GK	USA	William Yarbrough
23	MF	USA	Kellyn Acosta
24	DF	USA	Kortne Ford (HGP)
26	MF	USA	Cole Bassett (HGP)
30	FW	USA	Oliver Larraz (HGP)
32	MF	USA	Collen Warner
33	DF	IRI	Steven Beitashour
37	FW	USA	Dantouma Toure
52	MF	ARG	Braian Galván
66	DF	BRA	Lucas Esteves (on loan from Palmeiras)
77	FW	USA	Darren Yapi (HGP)

=== Out on loan ===
As of April 17, 2021

Note: Flags indicate national team as defined under FIFA eligibility rules; some limited exceptions apply. Players may hold more than one non-FIFA nationality.

No.	Pos.	Nation	Player
14	MF	KEN	Philip Mayaka (GA)
15	GK	USA	Andre Rawls
18	DF	USA	Jeremy Kelly
27	DF	USA	Sebastian Anderson (HGP)
28	GK	USA	Abraham Rodriguez (HGP)
29	FW	USA	Matt Hundley (HGP)
34	DF	USA	Michael Edwards

== Competitions ==
Win Draw Loss Upcoming fixture

=== Preseason ===
March 16	Colorado Rapids	2–0	Portland Timbers	Tucson, Arizona
	Barrios 18'; Acosta 42'	Report	(yellow card) 35'; (yellow card) 39'	Stadium: Kino Sports Complex
Note: 45-minute scrimmage.

March 16	Phoenix Rising	0–2	Colorado Rapids	Tucson, Arizona
	(yellow card) 5'	Report	Larraz 12'; Hundley 22'	Stadium: Kino Sports Complex
Note: 45-minute scrimmage.

March 20	Sporting Kansas City	0–1	Colorado Rapids	Tucson, Arizona
		Report	Abubakar (yellow card) 31'; Moor 79'	Stadium: Kino Sports Complex

March 27	New Mexico United	0–1	Colorado Rapids	Tucson, Arizona
	(yellow card) 31'; Guzmán (yellow card) 42'; Suggs (yellow card) 56'; (yellow card) 86'	Report	Shinyashiki 23'; (yellow card) 43'; Namli (yellow card) 45'; Wilkerson (yellow card) 77'; Rosenberry (yellow card) 78'	Stadium: Kino Sports Complex

April 3	Colorado Rapids	0–3	Real Salt Lake	Tucson, Arizona
19:00 MST			Julio 12'; Kreilach 44' (pen.), 77'	Stadium: Kino Sports Complex

April 7	Colorado Rapids	2–2	LA Galaxy	Tucson, Arizona
	Barrios 17'; Bassett 63'		Lletget 25'; Harvey 54'; Kljestan (red card) 85'	Stadium: Kino Sports Complex

April 10	Colorado Rapids	1–0	Phoenix Rising	Tucson, Arizona
9:00 PM MT	Barrios 20'; Yapi (yellow card) 87'	COL Report; PHX Report	(yellow card) 24'; (yellow card) 52'; Wynne (yellow card) 73'	Stadium: Kino Sports Complex

=== Major League Soccer ===
==== Standings ====
===== Western Conference =====
Pos	Team	Pld	W	L	T	GF	GA	GD	Pts	Qualification
1	Colorado Rapids	34	17	7	10	51	35	+16	61	Qualification for the Playoffs Conference semifinals and CONCACAF Champions League
2	Seattle Sounders FC	34	17	8	9	53	33	+20	60	Qualification for the Playoffs first round and CONCACAF Champions League
3	Sporting Kansas City	34	17	10	7	58	40	+18	58	Qualification for the Playoffs first round
4	Portland Timbers	34	17	13	4	56	52	+4	55	Qualification for the Playoffs first round
5	Minnesota United FC	34	13	11	10	42	44	−2	49	Qualification for the Playoffs first round

Source: MLS
Rules for classification: 1) points; 2) total wins; 3) total goal differential; 4) total goals scored; 5) fewer disciplinary points; 6) away goal differential; 7) away goals scored; 8) home goals differential; 9) home goals scored; 10) coin toss (2 clubs tied) or drawing of lots (≥3 clubs tied)

===== Overall table =====
Pos	Team	Pld	W	L	T	GF	GA	GD	Pts	Qualification
1	New England Revolution (S)	34	22	5	7	65	41	+24	73	Qualification for the 2022 CONCACAF Champions League (Note: As Supporters' Shield winners (USA2))
2	Colorado Rapids	34	17	7	10	51	35	+16	61	Qualification for the 2022 CONCACAF Champions League (Note: As 2021 MLS Western Conference regular season champions (USA3))
3	Seattle Sounders FC	34	17	8	9	53	33	+20	60	Qualification for the 2022 CONCACAF Champions League (Note: As highest-ranked U.S. based Division I club (based on 2021 MLS regular season record) not already qualified (USA4))
4	Sporting Kansas City	34	17	10	7	58	40	+18	58	
5	Portland Timbers	34	17	13	4	56	52	+4	55	

Source: MLS
Rules for classification: 1) points; 2) total wins; 3) total goal differential; 4) total goals scored; 5) fewer disciplinary points; 6) away goal differential; 7) away goals scored; 8) home goals differential; 9) home goals scored; 10) coin toss (2 clubs tied) or drawing of lots (≥3 clubs tied)
(S) Supporters' Shield winners

==== Results summary ====
Overall								Home						Away					
Pld	Pts	W	L	T	GF	GA	GD	W	L	T	GF	GA	GD	W	L	T	GF	GA	GD
34	61	17	7	10	51	35	+16	9	1	7	31	14	+17	8	6	3	20	21	−1

Source: MLS standings
Pld = Matches played; Pts = Points; W = Matches won; T = Matches tied; L = Matches lost; GF = Goals for; GA = Goals against; GD = Goal difference

==== Results by round ====
Round	1	2	3	4	5	6	7	8	9	10	11	12	13	14	15	16	17	18	19	20	21	22	23	24	25	26	27	28	29	30	31	32	33	34
Stadium	A	H	A	H	H	A	H	A	A	H	H	H	H	A	A	H	A	A	H	A	A	H	A	H	H	H	A	A	A	H	H	A	A	H
Result	D	L	W	W	W	L	W	W	L	D	W	D	W	L	W	D	W	W	W	D	W	D	D	D	D	W	L	W	L	D	W	L	W	W

Source: Colorado schedule
A = Away; H = Home; W = Win; D = Draw; L = Loss

==== Match results ====
April 17 1	FC Dallas	0–0	Colorado Rapids	Frisco, Texas
6:00 PM MDT		Report	Bassett (yellow card) 87'	Stadium: Toyota Stadium; Attendance: 8,621; Referee: Nima Saghafi

April 24 2	Colorado Rapids	1–3	Austin FC	Commerce City, Colorado
7:00 PM MDT	Shinyashiki 36', (yellow card) 40'; Price (yellow card) 47'	Report	Fagundez 59'; Domínguez 67', 71'; Pereira (yellow card) 73'	Stadium: Dick's Sporting Goods Park; Referee: Marcos de Oliviera

May 2 3	Vancouver Whitecaps FC	0–1	Colorado Rapids	Sandy, Utah
8:00 PM MDT	Cavallini (yellow card) 27'	Report	Namli (yellow card) 17'; Rubio 26'; Rosenberry (yellow card) 37'	Stadium: Rio Tinto Stadium; Referee: Baldomero Toledo

May 8 4	Colorado Rapids	3–2	Minnesota United FC	Commerce City, Colorado
8:00 PM MDT	Acosta (yellow card) 28', (goal) 57'; Rubio (yellow card) 35'; Bassett 71'; Wilson 82'; Vines (yellow card) 90+1'	Report	Reynoso 17'; Dotson 24'; Greguš (yellow card) 45+3'; Gasper (yellow card) 81'	Stadium: Dick's Sporting Goods Park; Referee: Timothy Ford

May 15 5	Colorado Rapids	3–1	Houston Dynamo FC	Commerce City, Colorado
7:00 PM MDT	Vines 29'; Rubio 36'; Bassett 42'; Mezquida (yellow card) 85'	Report	Ramirez 39'; Corona (yellow card) 67'; Figueroa (yellow card) 86'	Stadium: Dick's Sporting Goods Park; Referee: Victor Rivas

May 22 6	Los Angeles FC	2–1	Colorado Rapids	Los Angeles, California
8:30 PM MDT	Rossi 14', 33'; Cifuentes (yellow card) 60'	Report	Barrios 50'; Rubio (yellow card) 69'	Stadium: Banc of California Stadium; Attendance: 10,483; Referee: Ismail Elfath

May 29 7	Colorado Rapids	3–0	FC Dallas	Commerce City, Colorado
7:00 PM MDT	Rosenberry 13'; Wilson (yellow card) 59'; Barrios (yellow card) 68', (goal) 71'; Price (yellow card) 80'; Yarbrough (yellow card) 83'	Report	Bressan (yellow card) 39'; Tessmann 41' (o.g.); Jara (yellow card) 59'	Stadium: Dick's Sporting Goods Park; Referee: Guido Gonzales Jr.

June 19 8	FC Cincinnati	0–2	Colorado Rapids	Cincinnati, Ohio
5:30 PM MDT	Brenner (yellow card) 45'; Castillo (yellow card) 45+6'	Report	Rubio 21'; Acosta (yellow card) 23'; Abubakar (yellow card) 45+6'; Price (yellow card) 61'; Lewis 72'; Wilson (yellow card) 90+2'	Stadium: West End Stadium; Referee: Baldomero Toledo

June 23 9	Sporting Kansas City	3–1	Colorado Rapids	Kansas City, Kansas
6:30 PM MDT	Sallói 14', 38'; Hernández 64'	Report	Rosenberry 84'	Stadium: Children's Mercy Park; Attendance: 18,690; Referee: David Gantar

July 4 10	Colorado Rapids	1–1	Seattle Sounders FC	Commerce City, Colorado
7:00 PM MDT	Rubio (yellow card) 21'; Wilson (yellow card) 26'; Barrios 58'	Report	Andrade (yellow card) 34'; A. Roldan 41'; O'Neill (yellow card) 45+2'	Stadium: Dick's Sporting Goods Park; Attendance: 17,104; Referee: Kevin Stott

July 7 11	Colorado Rapids	2–0	Minnesota United FC	Commerce City, Colorado
7:00 PM MDT	Bassett (yellow card) 36'; Galván 45', (yellow card) 45+1'; Shinyashiki 81'; Wilson (yellow card) 83'	Report	Alonso (yellow card) 36'; Ábila (red card) 86'	Stadium: Dick's Sporting Goods Park; Referee: Ted Unkel

July 17 12	Colorado Rapids	1–1	San Jose Earthquakes	Commerce City, Colorado
7:00 PM MDT	Shinyashiki (yellow card) 38'; Bassett 53'; Toure (yellow card) 88'; Trusty (yellow card) 90+2'; Price (yellow card) 90+5'	Report	López 11'; Espinoza (yellow card) 55'	Stadium: Dick's Sporting Goods Park; Attendance: 14,664; Referee: Rosendo Mendoza

July 21 13	Colorado Rapids	2–0	FC Dallas	Commerce City, Colorado
7:00 PM MDT	Trusty (yellow card) 20'; Abubakar 48'; Barrios 55'; Warner (yellow card) 90+2'	Report	Cerrillo (yellow card) 34'; Quignon (yellow card) 43'	Stadium: Dick's Sporting Goods Park; Attendance: 8,321; Referee: Jon Freemon

July 24 14	Real Salt Lake	3–0	Colorado Rapids	Sandy, Utah
8:00 PM MDT	Yarbrough 14' (o.g.); Wood 30'; Morgan (yellow card) 61'; Rubin 76'; Kreilach (yellow card) 88'	Report	Wilson (yellow card) 23'; Shinyashiki (yellow card) 45+2'; Abubakar (yellow card) 65'	Stadium: Rio Tinto Stadium; Attendance: 17,325; Referee: Fotis Bazakos

July 31 15	Austin FC	0–1	Colorado Rapids	Austin, Texas
7:00 PM MDT	Fagúndez (yellow card) 25'; Stanley (yellow card) 90+5'	Report	Shinyashiki 29'	Stadium: Q2 Stadium; Attendance: 20,738; Referee: Marcos de Oliveira

August 7 16	Colorado Rapids	0–0	Sporting Kansas City	Commerce City, Colorado
7:00 PM MDT	Warner (yellow card) 28'; Beitashour (yellow card) 63'	Report	Punčec (yellow card) 10'; Lindsey (yellow card) 81'	Stadium: Dick's Sporting Goods Park; Attendance: 11,753; Referee: Ted Unkel

August 14 17	Houston Dynamo FC	1–3	Colorado Rapids	Houston, Texas
6:30 PM MDT	10 Picault 45+6' (pen.)	Report	Abubakar 5'; Rubio (yellow card) 24'; Barrios 60'; Galván 80'	Stadium: BBVA Stadium; Attendance: 13,908; Referee: Rosendo Mendoza

August 17 18	LA Galaxy	1–2	Colorado Rapids	Carson, California
8:30 PM MDT	Raveloson 34'; Grandsir (yellow card) 62'	Report	Lewis 13' (pen.); Warner (yellow card) 29'; Wilson (yellow card) 49'; Price (yellow card) 69'; Shinyashiki 73'	Stadium: Dignity Health Sports Park; Attendance: 15,101; Referee: Silviu Petrescu

August 21 19	Colorado Rapids	2–1	Real Salt Lake	Commerce City, Colorado
7:00 PM MDT	Rubio 64'; Kaye 71'; Galván (yellow card) 85'	Report	Toia (yellow card) 3'; Rusnák 51'; Menéndez (yellow card) 56'; Meram (yellow card) 85'; Kreilach (yellow card) 90+3'	Stadium: Dick's Sporting Goods Park; Attendance: 13,134; Referee: Drew Fischer

August 28 20	Sporting Kansas City	1–1	Colorado Rapids	Kansas City, Kansas
6:30 PM MDT	Russell 41'	Report	Lewis 17', (yellow card) 30'; Abubakar (yellow card) 30'; Trusty (yellow card) 69'; Rosenberry (yellow card) 72'	Stadium: Children's Mercy Park; Attendance: 19,883; Referee: Fotis Bazakos

September 4 21	San Jose Earthquakes	0–1	Colorado Rapids	San Jose, California
8:00 PM MDT	Remedi (yellow card) 61'; Alanís (yellow card) 84'	Report	Abubakar (yellow card) 4'; Mezquida (yellow card) 81'; Price (yellow card) 85'; Badji 89'	Stadium: PayPal Park; Attendance: 14,142; Referee: Joseph Dickerson

September 11 22	Colorado Rapids	1–1	LA Galaxy	Commerce City, Colorado
1:30 PM MDT	Galván (yellow card) 45'; Barrios 66', (yellow card) 79'; Warner (yellow card) 87'	Report	Williams (yellow card) 36'; Grandsir 80'; Villafaña (yellow card) 89'	Stadium: Dick's Sporting Goods Park; Attendance: 11,736; Referee: Rosendo Mendoza

September 15 23	Portland Timbers	2–2	Colorado Rapids	Portland, Oregon
8:00 PM MDT	Blanco (yellow card) 31', (goal) 90+1'; Tuiloma (yellow card) 33' (yellow-red card) 42'; Paredes (yellow card) 67'; Mora 67'; Clark (yellow card) 82'	Report	Trusty (yellow card) 31'; Lewis 64'; Kaye (yellow card) 66'; Barrios 86'; Abubakar (yellow card) 88'	Stadium: Providence Park; Attendance: 16,808; Referee: Armando Villarreal

September 19 24	Colorado Rapids	1–1	Vancouver Whitecaps FC	Commerce City, Colorado
1:30 PM MDT	Galván (yellow card) 17'; Wilson 28'	Report	White 41'	Stadium: Dick's Sporting Goods Park; Attendance: 8,454; Referee: Rubiel Vazquez

September 25 25	Colorado Rapids	0–0	Toronto FC	Commerce City, Colorado
6:00 PM MDT	Kaye (yellow card) 45+2'	Report	Mullins (yellow card) 70'	Stadium: Dick's Sporting Goods Park; Attendance: 12,613; Referee: Michael Radchuk

September 29 26	Colorado Rapids	3–0	Austin FC	Commerce City, Colorado
7:00 PM MDT	Lewis 45+2'; Mezquida 46'; Trusty 59'; Warner (yellow card) 81'	Report	Gaines (yellow card) 28'; Lima (yellow card) 44'; Stroud (yellow card) 70'; Domínguez (yellow card) 90+3'	Stadium: Dick's Sporting Goods Park; Attendance: 8,582; Referee: Michael Radchuk

October 3 27	Seattle Sounders FC	3–0	Colorado Rapids	Seattle, Washington
8:00 PM MDT	Roldan 2'; Medranda 22'; João Paulo 45+1'	Report	Wilson (yellow card) 24'; Barrios (yellow card) 49'; Rubio (yellow card) 54'; Esteves (red card) 61'; Namli (yellow card) 77'	Stadium: Lumen Field; Attendance: 31,425; Referee: Chris Penso

October 9 28	Minnesota United FC	1–3	Colorado Rapids	Saint Paul, Minnesota
6:00 PM MDT	Hunou 8' (yellow card) 54'	Report	Warner (yellow card) 35'; Wilson (red card) 57'; Bassett 73' (pen.); Barrios 84'; Esteves 90+3'	Stadium: Allianz Field; Referee: Jon Freemon

October 16 29	Real Salt Lake	3–1	Colorado Rapids	Sandy, Utah
7:30 PM MDT	Kreilach 13'; Rubin 56'; Holt (yellow card) 61'; Ochoa (yellow card) 90+6'; Julio 90+6'	Report	Warner (yellow card) 22'; Price (yellow card) 31'; Rubio (yellow card) 65'; Namli 73'	Stadium: Rio Tinto Stadium; Referee: Kevin Stott

October 20 30	Colorado Rapids	1–1	Seattle Sounders FC	Commerce City, Colorado
7:00 PM MDT	Badji 66'	Report	Medranda (yellow card) 63'; Roldan 75'; O'Neill (yellow card) 88'	Stadium: Dick's Sporting Goods Park; Attendance: 9,316; Referee: Drew Fischer

October 23 31	Colorado Rapids	2–0	Portland Timbers	Commerce City, Colorado
7:00 PM MDT	Badji 45+2'; Rubio 63'; Price (yellow card) 90+3'	Report	Asprilla (yellow card) 68'; Fochive (yellow card) 81'	Stadium: Dick's Sporting Goods Park; Attendance: 12,200; Referee: Ted Unkel

October 27 32	New England Revolution	1–0	Colorado Rapids	Foxborough, Massachusetts
5:00 PM MDT	Buchanan 74'	Report	Abubakar (yellow card) 15'; Rubio (yellow card) 53'; Esteves (yellow card) 90+2'	Stadium: Gillette Stadium; Attendance: 10,199; Referee: Victor Rivas

October 31 33	Houston Dynamo FC	0–1	Colorado Rapids	Houston, Texas
1:30 PM MDT	Carrasquilla (yellow card) 29'; Rodríguez (yellow card) 44'; Corona (yellow card) 52'	Report	Badji (yellow card) 10' (goal) 58'; Bassett (yellow card) 75'; Shinyashiki (yellow card) 90+6'	Stadium: BBVA Stadium; Attendance: 14,474; Referee: Guido Gonzales Jr.

November 7 34	Colorado Rapids	5–2	Los Angeles FC	Commerce City, Colorado
4:00 PM MDT	Price (yellow card) 15'; Lewis 18', 53'; Warner 33'; Bassett 63'; Wilson (yellow card) 72'; Badji 79'	Report	Arango 55'; Rodríguez 71'; Edwards (yellow card) 83'	Stadium: Dick's Sporting Goods Park; Attendance: 16,292; Referee: Allen Chapman

=== MLS Cup Playoffs ===
The Rapids clinched the regular season Western Conference title on the last day of the season, November 7. They lost to the Portland Timbers in the Western Conference Semifinals on November 25.

November 25 Conference Semifinals	Colorado Rapids	0–1	Portland Timbers	Commerce City, Colorado
2:30 PM MST		Report	Župarić (yellow card) 45'; Mabiala 90'; Asprilla (red card) 90+4'	Stadium: Dick's Sporting Goods Park; Attendance: 17,438; Referee: Ted Unkel

=== U.S. Open Cup ===
It was announced on March 29 that the opening round of the tournament would not be held, and that the top eight MLS teams based on point per game from the first three weeks of the season would participate in the tournament. U.S. Soccer's Open Cup Committee announced it was not holding the 2021 U.S. Open Cup in the spring, but did not rule out holding the tournament later in the year. At the conclusion of the first three weeks of the season, the Rapids had gained 1.33 PPG, but that was not enough to qualify for the tournament. Eventually, it was announced that the U.S. Open Cup would not be held at all in 2021.

==== Qualification ====
April 17 1	FC Dallas (Texas)	0–0	Colorado Rapids	Frisco, Texas
6:00 PM MDT		Report	Bassett (yellow card) 87'	Stadium: Toyota Stadium; Attendance: 8,621; Referee: Nima Saghafi

April 24 2	Colorado Rapids	1–3	Austin FC (Texas)	Commerce City, Colorado
7:00 PM MDT	Shinyashiki 36', (yellow card) 40'; Price (yellow card) 47'	Report	Fagundez 59'; Domínguez 67', 71'; Pereira (yellow card) 73'	Stadium: Dick's Sporting Goods Park; Referee: Marcos de Oliviera

May 2 3	Vancouver Whitecaps FC (Canada)	0–1	Colorado Rapids	Sandy, Utah
8:00 PM MDT	Cavallini (yellow card) 27'	Report	Namli (yellow card) 17'; Rubio 26'; Rosenberry (yellow card) 37'	Stadium: Rio Tinto Stadium; Referee: Baldomero Toledo

== Statistics ==
=== Appearances and goals ===
Numbers after plus–sign (+) denote appearances as a substitute.

No.	Pos	Nat	Player	Total		MLS		MLS Cup Playoffs	
No.	Pos	Nat	Player	Apps	Goals	Apps	Goals	Apps	Goals
1	GK	(United States) USA	Clint Irwin	1	0	1	0	0	0
2	DF	(United States) USA	Keegan Rosenberry	31	2	30	2	1	0
3	DF	(United States) USA	Drew Moor	12	0	1+11	0	0	0
4	DF	(Scotland) SCO	Danny Wilson	30	2	29	2	1	0
5	DF	(United States) USA	Auston Trusty	34	1	33	1	1	0
6	DF	(Ghana) GHA	Lalas Abubakar	25	2	23+1	2	1	0
7	FW	(United States) USA	Jonathan Lewis	28	7	12+15	7	0+1	0
8	FW	(Senegal) SEN	Dominique Badji	13	5	3+9	5	1	0
9	FW	(Brazil) BRA	Andre Shinyashiki	32	4	18+14	4	0	0
11	FW	(Chile) CHI	Diego Rubio	27	5	19+7	5	1	0
12	FW	(Colombia) COL	Michael Barrios	34	8	25+8	8	0+1	0
14	MF	(Canada) CAN	Mark-Anthony Kaye	16	1	14+1	1	1	0
19	MF	(England) ENG	Jack Price	31	0	30	0	1	0
20	MF	(Uruguay) URU	Nicolás Mezquida	22	1	6+16	1	0	0
21	MF	(Denmark) DEN	Younes Namli	12	1	6+5	1	0+1	0
22	GK	(United States) USA	William Yarbrough	34	0	33	0	1	0
23	MF	(United States) USA	Kellyn Acosta	22	1	19+2	1	1	0
26	MF	(United States) USA	Cole Bassett	32	5	22+9	5	1	0
27	DF	(United States) USA	Sebastian Anderson	1	0	0+1	0	0	0
30	MF	(United States) USA	Oliver Larraz	4	0	0+4	0	0	0
32	MF	(United States) USA	Collen Warner	13	1	8+5	1	0	0
33	DF	(Iran) IRI	Steven Beitashour	11	0	6+5	0	0	0
37	FW	(United States) USA	Dantouma Toure	1	0	0+1	0	0	0
52	FW	(Argentina) ARG	Braian Galván	25	2	14+10	2	0+1	0
66	DF	(Brazil) BRA	Lucas Esteves	14	1	9+5	1	0	0
Players transferred/loaned out during the season
10	FW	(France) FRA	Nicolas Benezet	11	0	1+10	0	0	0
13	DF	(United States) USA	Sam Vines	8	1	8	1	0	0

- Last updated: November 25, 2021
- Source: Colorado stats

=== Top scorers ===
Rank	Position	Number	Name	MLS	MLS Cup Playoffs	Total
1	FW	12	(Colombia) Michael Barrios	8	0	8
2	FW	7	(United States) Jonathan Lewis	7	0	7
3	FW	8	(Senegal) Dominique Badji	5	0	5
3	FW	11	(Chile) Diego Rubio	5	0	5
3	MF	26	(United States) Cole Bassett	5	0	5
6	FW	9	(Brazil) Andre Shinyashiki	4	0	4
7	DF	2	(United States) Keegan Rosenberry	2	0	2
7	DF	4	(Scotland) Danny Wilson	2	0	2
7	DF	6	(Ghana) Lalas Abubakar	2	0	2
7	FW	52	(Argentina) Braian Galván	2	0	2
11	DF	5	(United States) Auston Trusty	1	0	1
11	DF	13	(United States) Sam Vines	1	0	1
11	MF	20	(Uruguay) Nicolás Mezquida	1	0	1
11	MF	21	(Denmark) Younes Namli	1	0	1
11	MF	23	(United States) Kellyn Acosta	1	0	1
11	MF	32	(United States) Collen Warner	1	0	1
11	DF	66	(Brazil) Lucas Esteves	1	0	1
Total				50	0	50

- Last updated: November 25, 2021
- Source: Team Goals

=== Top assists ===
Rank	Position	Number	Name	MLS	MLS Cup Playoffs	Total
1	MF	19	(England) Jack Price	12	0	12
2	FW	12	(Colombia) Michael Barrios	5	0	5
3	FW	11	(Chile) Diego Rubio	4	0	4
4	MF	26	(United States) Cole Bassett	3	0	3
4	FW	52	(Argentina) Braian Galván	3	0	3
6	FW	9	(Brazil) Andre Shinyashiki	2	0	2
6	MF	23	(United States) Kellyn Acosta	2	0	2
8	FW	7	(United States) Jonathan Lewis	1	0	1
8	FW	10	(France) Nicolas Benezet	1	0	1
8	DF	13	(United States) Sam Vines	1	0	1
8	MF	14	(Canada) Mark-Anthony Kaye	1	0	1
8	MF	20	(Uruguay) Nicolás Mezquida	1	0	1
8	MF	21	(Denmark) Younes Namli	1	0	1
8	DF	33	(Iran) Steven Beitashour	1	0	1
Total				38	0	38

- Last updated: November 25, 2021
- Source: Team Assists

=== Clean sheets ===
Rank	Number	Name	MLS	MLS Cup Playoffs	Total
1	22	(United States) William Yarbrough	13	0	13
Total			13	0	13

- Last updated: November 25, 2021
- Source: Clean Sheets

=== Disciplinary record ===
Rank	No.	Pos.	Player	MLS			MLS Cup Playoffs			Total		
Rank	No.	Pos.	Player	Booked	(yellow card) (yellow-red card)	Sent off (straight red)	Booked	(yellow card) (yellow-red card)	Sent off (straight red)	Booked	(yellow card) (yellow-red card)	Sent off (straight red)
1	4	DF	(Scotland) Danny Wilson	8	0	1	0	0	0	8	0	1
1	19	MF	(England) Jack Price	9	0	0	0	0	0	9	0	0
3	32	MF	(United States) Collen Warner	7	0	0	0	0	0	7	0	0
3	11	FW	(Chile) Diego Rubio	7	0	0	0	0	0	7	0	0
5	6	DF	(Ghana) Lalas Abubakar	6	0	0	0	0	0	6	0	0
6	5	DF	(United States) Auston Trusty	4	0	0	0	0	0	4	0	0
6	9	FW	(Brazil) Andre Shinyashiki	4	0	0	0	0	0	4	0	0
6	52	FW	(Argentina) Braian Galván	4	0	0	0	0	0	4	0	0
9	12	FW	(Colombia) Michael Barrios	3	0	0	0	0	0	3	0	0
9	26	MF	(United States) Cole Bassett	3	0	0	0	0	0	3	0	0
11	66	DF	(Brazil) Lucas Esteves	1	0	1	0	0	0	1	0	1
11	2	DF	(United States) Keegan Rosenberry	2	0	0	0	0	0	2	0	0
11	14	MF	(Canada) Mark-Anthony Kaye	2	0	0	0	0	0	2	0	0
11	20	MF	(Uruguay) Nicolás Mezquida	2	0	0	0	0	0	2	0	0
11	21	MF	(Denmark) Younes Namli	2	0	0	0	0	0	2	0	0
11	23	MF	(United States) Kellyn Acosta	2	0	0	0	0	0	2	0	0
17	7	FW	(United States) Jonathan Lewis	1	0	0	0	0	0	1	0	0
17	8	FW	(Senegal) Dominique Badji	1	0	0	0	0	0	1	0	0
17	13	DF	(United States) Sam Vines	1	0	0	0	0	0	1	0	0
17	22	GK	(United States) William Yarbrough	1	0	0	0	0	0	1	0	0
17	33	DF	(Iran) Steven Beitashour	1	0	0	0	0	0	1	0	0
17	37	FW	(United States) Dantouma Toure	1	0	0	0	0	0	1	0	0
Total				72	0	2	0	0	0	72	0	2

- Last updated: November 25, 2021
- Source: Team Discipline

== Transfers ==
For transfers in, dates listed are when the Rapids officially signed the players to the roster. For transfers out, dates are listed when the Rapids officially removed the players from the roster, not when they signed with another club. If a player later signed with a different club, his new club will be noted, but the date listed remains when he was officially removed from the roster.

=== In ===
Pos.	Player	Transferred from	Fee/notes	Date	Source
FW	(Colombia) Michael Barrios	(United States) FC Dallas	FC Dallas receives an international roster spot and the 15th pick in the 2021 MLS SuperDraft. The Rapids also receive the 21st pick in the SuperDraft	January 13, 2021	
GK	(United States) William Yarbrough	(Mexico) León	Three-year contract with a club option	February 2, 2021	
FW	(United States) Oliver Larraz	(United States) Colorado Rapids Academy	Two-year Homegrown Player contract with a club option for two additional years.	March 3, 2021	
FW	(United States) Darren Yapi	(United States) Colorado Springs Switchbacks	Five-year Homegrown Player contract with a club option for one additional year.	March 3, 2021	
DF	(United States) Michael Edwards	(Germany) VfL Wolfsburg II	Two-year Homegrown Player contract with a club option for two additional years. D.C. United will receive $75,000 in general allocation money for Edwards' homegrown priority.	March 4, 2021	
FW	(United States) Dantouma Toure	(United States) New York Red Bulls II	Four-year contract with a club option for an additional two years. New York Red Bulls will receive $50,000 in general allocation money for Toure's homegrown priority.	March 4, 2021	
MF	(Canada) Mark-Anthony Kaye	(United States) Los Angeles FC	Los Angeles FC receives $1 million in general allocation money and a 2022 international roster spot. Colorado also receives a 2022 first-round Superdraft pick.	July 27, 2021	
FW	(Senegal) Dominique Badji	(United States) Nashville SC	Nashville SC receive $50,000 in general allocation money.	July 29, 2021	

==== Loans in ====
Pos.	Player	Parent club	Length/Notes	Beginning	End	Source
DF	(Brazil) Lucas Esteves	(Brazil) Palmeiras	One-year loan with an option to buy	August 6, 2021	June 2022	

==== SuperDraft ====
Draft picks are not automatically signed to the team roster. Only those who are signed to a contract will be listed as transfers in. Only trades involving draft picks and executed after the start of the 2021 MLS SuperDraft will be listed in the notes.

Date	Player	Position	Previous club	Notes	Ref
January 21, 2020	(Kenya) Philip Mayaka	MF	Clemson	Colorado traded the 6th overall pick in the 2021 SuperDraft and $200,000 in GAM to the Houston Dynamo in exchange for the 3rd overall pick, used to select Mayaka.	

=== Out ===
Pos.	Player	Transferred to	Fee/notes	Date	Source
FW	(United States) Niki Jackson	(United States) San Diego Loyal	Contract Option declined	December 14, 2020	
DF	(Rwanda) Abdul Rwatubyaye	(North Macedonia) KF Shkupi	Contract Option declined	December 14, 2020	
DF	(New Zealand) Deklan Wynne	(United States) Phoenix Rising	Contract Option declined	December 14, 2020	
DF	(United States) Sam Vines	(Belgium) Royal Antwerp	Transfer Fee not disclosed	August 5, 2021	
FW	(France) Nicolas Benezet	(United States) Seattle Sounders FC	Colorado receives $50,000 in general allocation money	August 5, 2021	

==== Loans out ====
Pos.	Player	Loanee club	Length/Notes	Beginning	End	Source
MF	(Kenya) Philip Mayaka	(United States) Colorado Springs Switchbacks	Duration of USL Championship season	March 24, 2021	November 6, 2021	
GK	(United States) Andre Rawls	(United States) Phoenix Rising FC	Duration of USL Championship season	March 24, 2021	November 6, 2021	
DF	(United States) Jeremy Kelly	(United States) Phoenix Rising FC	Recalled by the Rapids	March 24, 2021	July 1, 2021	
DF	(United States) Sebastian Anderson	(United States) Colorado Springs Switchbacks	Duration of USL Championship season	March 24, 2021	November 6, 2021	
GK	(United States) Abraham Rodriguez	(United States) Colorado Springs Switchbacks	Duration of USL Championship season	March 24, 2021	November 6, 2021	
FW	(United States) Matt Hundley	(United States) Colorado Springs Switchbacks	Duration of USL Championship season	March 24, 2021	November 6, 2021	
DF	(United States) Michael Edwards	(United States) Colorado Springs Switchbacks	Duration of USL Championship season	March 24, 2021	November 6, 2021	

== See also ==
- Colorado Rapids
- 2021 in American soccer
- 2021 Major League Soccer season
