= Lalas Abubakar =

Ghanaian footballer (born 1994)

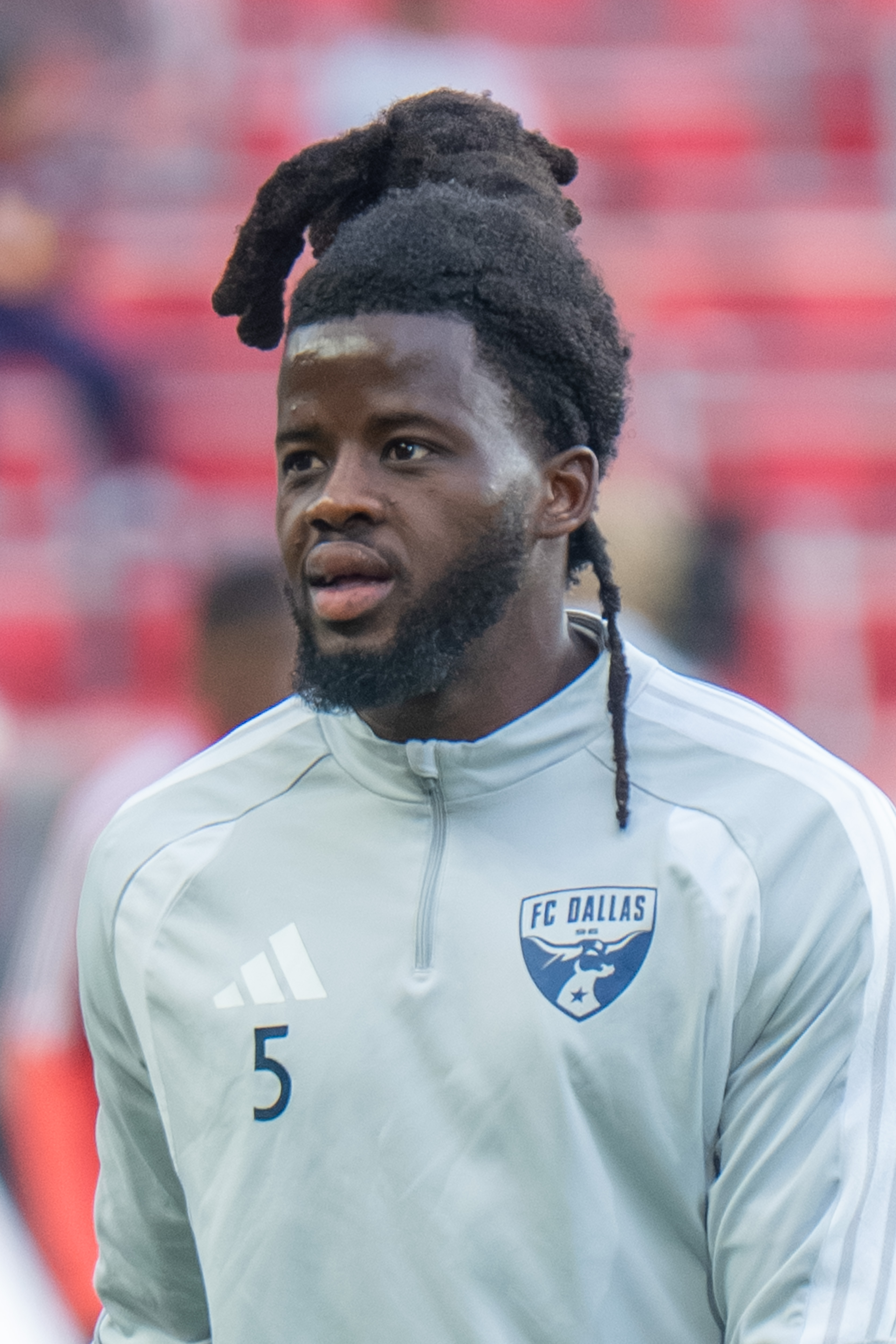
- Abubakar with FC Dallas in 2026

Personal information
- Full name: Alhassan Abubakar
- Date of birth: 25 December 1994 (age 31)
- Place of birth: Kumasi, Ghana
- Height: 6 ft 1 in (1.85 m)
- Position: Centre-back

Team information
- Current team: FC Dallas
- Number: 5

College career
Years	Team	Apps	(Gls)
2013	University of Ghana		
2014–2016	Dayton Flyers	61	(4)

Senior career*
Years	Team	Apps	(Gls)
2015	Charlotte Eagles	14	(2)
2016	Michigan Bucks	12	(0)
2017–2019	Columbus Crew	31	(2)
2017	→ Pittsburgh Riverhounds (loan)	5	(0)
2019	→ Colorado Rapids (loan)	22	(0)
2020–2024	Colorado Rapids	117	(9)
2022	Colorado Rapids 2	3	(0)
2025–	FC Dallas	11	(1)

International career
- Ghana U20
- * Club domestic league appearances and goals as of 19 December 2024

Alhassan "Lalas" Abubakar (born 25 December 1994) is a Ghanaian professional footballer who plays as a centre back for Major League Soccer club FC Dallas.

== Early life ==
Born in Kumasi, Abubakar was raised in the Ghanaian capital of Accra and attended the University of Ghana. He participated in the football team at the university and in 2013, after one of his teammates was selected to join the Dayton Flyers program in the United States, Abubakar was also offered to join after his friend recommended him. Despite having a couple offers in Europe, Abubakar decided to attend the University of Dayton in Ohio and play college soccer for the Flyers.

=== Dayton Flyers ===
During his three seasons with the Dayton Flyers, Abubakar appeared in 61 matches, scoring four goals and earned six assists. During the 2015 season, Abubakar won the A-10 Championship with Dayton, and made it to the second round of the NCAA Tournament. In 2016, Abubakar was named the Defensive Player of the Year, and was also named in the A10 Men's Soccer All-Conference First Team.

== Club career ==
=== Charlotte Eagles and Michigan Bucks ===
During the college soccer offseason, Abubakar played for Premier Development League club Charlotte Eagles. The team went undefeated during the 2015 season. Abubakar was named in the Eastern Conference team of the season, and was a finalist for the PDL's Young Player of the Year award, losing out to Timothy Mueller.

The next season, in 2016, Abubakar joined the Michigan Bucks. Appearing in 17 matches, Abubakar helped the Bucks win the Premier Development League title, featuring in the final against Calgary Foothills on 6 August, a 3–2 victory. Following the season, Abubakar was named the PDL Defender of the Year. and was also named in the All-League Team.

=== Columbus Crew SC ===
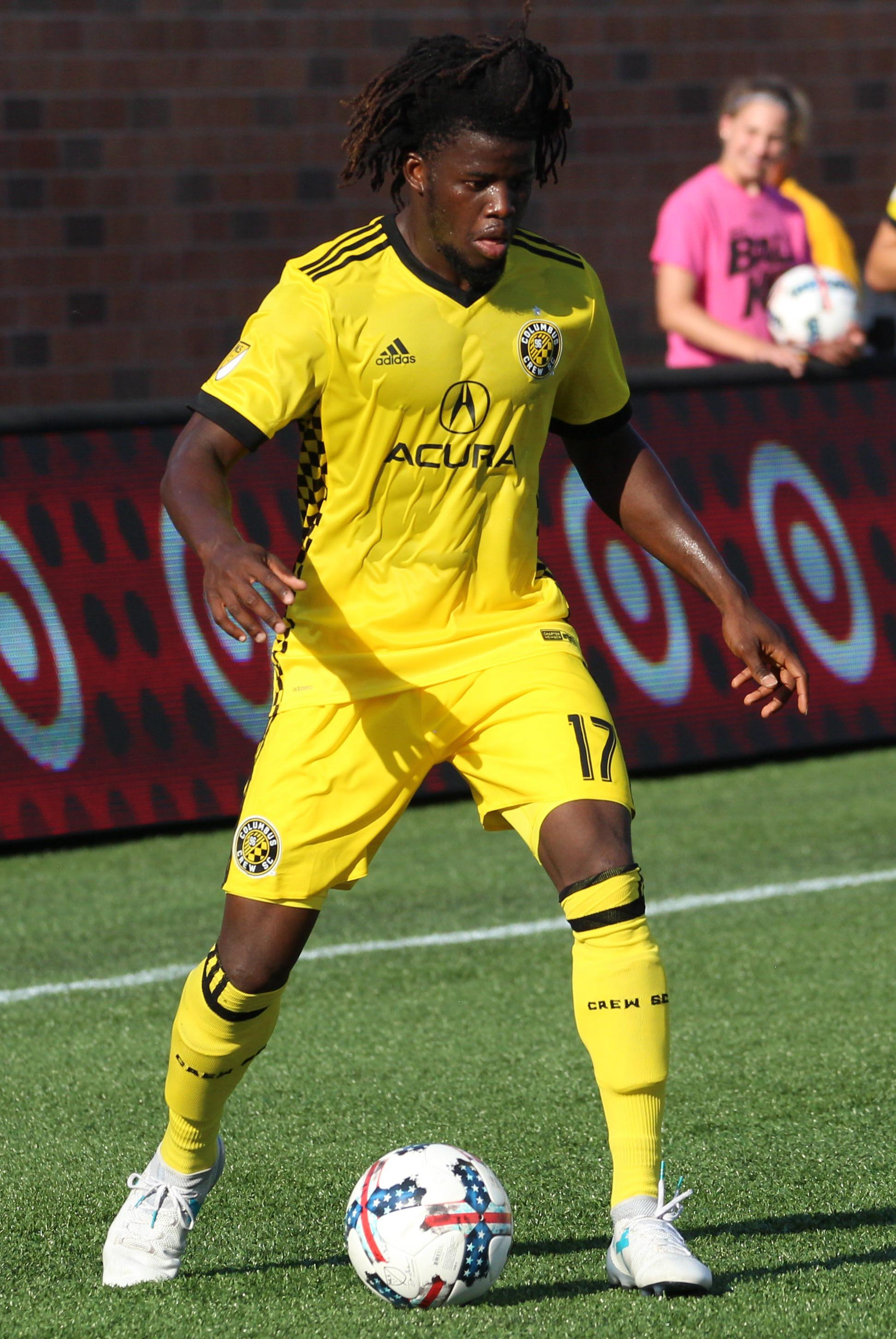
Abubakar with Columbus Crew in 2017

On 13 January 2017, Abubakar was drafted by Columbus Crew SC in the first round of the 2017 MLS SuperDraft, and the fifth pick overall. During his first season in Columbus, Abubakar split time with Columbus and the Pittsburgh Riverhounds in what is now the USL Championship. In total, Abubakar made 15 appearances; ten with Columbus and five with Pittsburgh. He scored his first professional goal on 19 August 2017 during a 1–1 draw against Orlando City. During the 2018 season, Abubakar played in 23 matches, scoring one goal. Abubakar made one appearance for the Columbus Crew in 2019 before being loaned to the Colorado Rapids in exchange for $125,000 in 2019 Targeted Allocation Money

==== Colorado Rapids (loan) ====
During the 2018 season, despite Abubakar's uptick in appearances, his performances were largely considered inconsistent and he was relegated to a reserve role for newly appointed Columbus Crew coach, Caleb Porter for the 2019 season. Owing to this, and Columbus's depth in the center-back position, Abubakar was loaned out to fellow Major League Soccer club, the Colorado Rapids. Abubakar appeared in 22 matches for the Rapids, earning the team's Defender of the Year award and helping the club to make a late season playoff push that ultimately fell short.

=== Colorado Rapids ===
Following the 2019 season, on November 20, 2019, Abubakar was permanently traded to the Colorado Rapids in exchange for $400,000 in General Allocation Money and a 2020 international roster spot. He made his debut as a permanent member of the Rapids on February 29 in their opening match against D.C. United. Starting next to Drew Moor, Abubakar helped the Rapids to a 2–1 away victory. On 9 September, Abubakar scored his first goal for the Rapids, a late second half stoppage-time equalizer against the Houston Dynamo to draw the game 1–1. Abubakar finished his first season with the Rapids with 18 appearances, all starts, and the one goal. He also earned the Colorado Rapids Defender of the Year award for the second consecutive season.

On 15 December 2020, Abubakar signed a new contract with the Colorado Rapids, keeping him at the club until through 2024. He scored his second goal for the club on 21 July 2021, an opening goal in the 48th minute, as the Rapids won 2–0 at home against FC Dallas. He then opened the scoring again for the Rapids on 14 August in a 3–1 away victory against the Houston Dynamo.

=== FC Dallas ===
Abubakar joined FC Dallas on 19 December 2024 on a two-year contract with a one-year club option.

== International career ==
Abubakar has been called up to represent Ghana at the under-20 level.

== Career statistics ==
As of October 21, 2022

Club	Season	League			Playoffs (Note: Includes the PDL Playoffs and MLS Cup Playoffs)		Cup		Continental		Total	
Club	Season	Division	Apps	Goals	Apps	Goals	Apps	Goals	Apps	Goals	Apps	Goals
Charlotte Eagles	2015	Premier Development League	14	2	2	1	–		–		16	3
Michigan Bucks	2016	Premier Development League	12	0	4	0	1	0	–		17	0
Columbus Crew SC	2017	Major League Soccer	7	1	3	0	0	0	–		10	1
Columbus Crew SC	2018	Major League Soccer	23	1	1	0	1	0	–		25	1
Columbus Crew SC	2019	Major League Soccer	1	0	–		0	0	–		1	0
Columbus Crew SC	Total		31	2	4	0	1	0	0	0	36	2
Pittsburgh Riverhounds (loan)	2017	United Soccer League	5	0	–		0	0	–		5	0
Colorado Rapids (loan)	2019	Major League Soccer	22	0	0	0	1	0	–		23	0
Colorado Rapids	2020	Major League Soccer	17	1	1	0	0	0	–		18	1
Colorado Rapids	2021	Major League Soccer	24	2	0	0	–		–		24	2
Colorado Rapids	2022	Major League Soccer	32	4	0	0	0	0	2	0	34	4
Colorado Rapids	2023	Major League Soccer	26	2	–		2	0	0	0	28	2
Colorado Rapids	Total		121	9	1	0	3	0	2	0	127	9
Career total			183	13	11	1	5	0	2	0	201	14
