= Keegan Rosenberry =

American soccer player (born 1993)

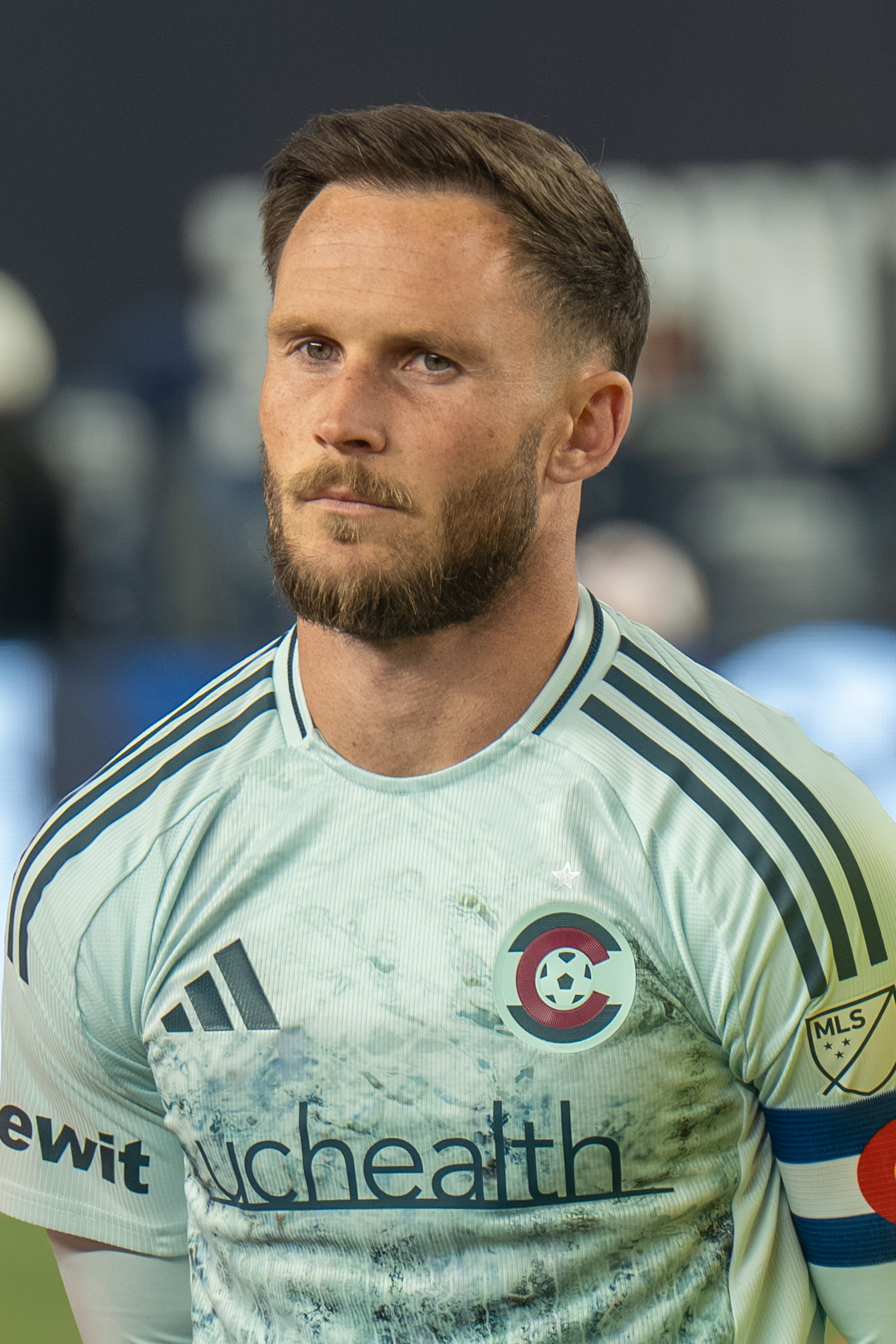
- Rosenberry with the Colorado Rapids in 2026

Personal information
- Full name: Keegan Rosenberry
- Date of birth: December 11, 1993 (age 32)
- Place of birth: Harrisburg, Pennsylvania, United States
- Height: 5 ft 8 in (1.73 m)
- Position: Right-back

Team information
- Current team: Colorado Rapids
- Number: 2

Youth career
- 2005–2009: Spirit United
- 2009–2011: Penn Fusion
- 2011–2012: Philadelphia Union

College career
Years	Team	Apps	(Gls)
2012–2015	Georgetown Hoyas	90	(4)

Senior career*
Years	Team	Apps	(Gls)
2013–2015	Reading United	14	(1)
2016–2018	Philadelphia Union	80	(3)
2017	→ Bethlehem Steel FC	1	(0)
2019–	Colorado Rapids	176	(7)
2022	→ Colorado Rapids 2	2	(0)
- * Club domestic league appearances and goals as of March 15, 2025

Keegan Rosenberry (born December 11, 1993) is an American professional soccer player who plays as a right-back for Major League Soccer club Colorado Rapids.

== Early career ==
He played at Penn Fusion soccer club. Rosenberry played his four years of high school soccer at Lancaster Mennonite High School between 2008 and 2012. While there, he was on teams that won district titles as well as a state title his senior year.

Rosenberry played four years of college soccer at Georgetown University between 2012 and 2015, making 90 appearances and scoring four goals.

While at college, Rosenberry also appeared for Premier Development League side Reading United AC in 2013 and 2015.

== Professional career ==
=== Philadelphia Union ===
On January 11, 2016, Rosenberry was selected 3rd overall in the 2016 MLS SuperDraft by Philadelphia Union. He made his Union debut on March 6, 2016, during a 0–2 loss against FC Dallas. During the 2016 season, he started every game, playing the full 90 minutes. In the home opener, he was nominated for man of the match as well as being selected to the MLS Team of the Week. In July 2016 he was also voted into the roster for the 2016 MLS All-Star Game, and at the end of the season came second in voting for 2016 Rookie of the Year.

=== Colorado Rapids ===
On December 19, 2018, Rosenberry was traded to Colorado Rapids in exchange for $150,000 General Allocation in 2019, $50,000 Targeted Allocation in 2019 and $100,000 General Allocation in 2020, plus $100,000 in conditional payments.

On February 20, 2019, Rosenberry signed a three-year contract extension through the 2022 season. Rosenberry started and played a full 90 minutes in all 34 regular season matches for Colorado, one of just three outfield players to play all 3,060 minutes. It was Rosenberry's second time accomplishing the feat, after doing so in his rookie year in Philadelphia. Rosenberry scored his first goal for Colorado and added an assist against Toronto FC on September 15 He was named to the MLS Team of the Week in Week 23

In 2020, Rosenberry made 16 starts among 17 league appearances, and played a full 90 minutes in Colorado's MLS Cup Playoff first-round loss to Minnesota United FC. Rosenberry picked up two assists and scored one goal, game-winning volley against Seattle Sounders FC on November 1, which was named MLS Goal of the Week in Week 22.

In January 2022, Colorado announced they had signed Rosenberry to a three-year contract extension.

== International career ==
On January 5, 2017, following his first professional season, Rosenberry was called up to the senior United States squad by coach Bruce Arena. He was called up again under newly appointed head coach Gregg Berhalter for the January 2019 friendlies. However, he did not appear in any of the matches during these camps.

== Career statistics ==
As of October 21, 2023

Club	Season	League			National cup		Continental		Other		Total	
Club	Season	Division	Apps	Goals	Apps	Goals	Apps	Goals	Apps	Goals	Apps	Goals
Reading United	2013	Premier Development League	8	0	3	0	–		1 (Note: Appearance in the PDL playoffs)	0	12	0
Reading United	2015	Premier Development League	6	1	2	0	–		–		8	1
Reading United	Total		14	1	5	0	0	0	1	0	20	1
Philadelphia Union	2016	Major League Soccer	34	2	1	0	–		1 (Note: Appearance in MLS Cup Playoffs)	0	36	2
Philadelphia Union	2017	Major League Soccer	14	0	2	0	–		–		16	0
Philadelphia Union	2018	Major League Soccer	32	1	5	0	–		1	0	38	1
Philadelphia Union	Total		80	3	8	0	0	0	2	0	90	3
Bethlehem Steel FC	2017	United Soccer League	1	0	0	0	–		0	0	1	0
Colorado Rapids	2019	Major League Soccer	34	1	1	0	–		0	0	35	1
Colorado Rapids	2020	Major League Soccer	17	1	0	0	–		1	0	18	1
Colorado Rapids	2021	Major League Soccer	30	2	–		–		1	0	31	2
Colorado Rapids	2022	Major League Soccer	34	2	1	0	2	0	0	0	37	2
Colorado Rapids	2023	Major League Soccer	26	0	2	0	2	0	0	0	30	0
Colorado Rapids	Total		141	6	4	0	4	0	2	0	151	6
Colorado Rapids 2 (loan)	2022	MLS Next Pro	2	0	–		–		–		2	0
Career total			238	10	17	0	4	0	5	0	264	10

== Honors ==
Philadelphia Union

- U.S. Open Cup runner-up: 2018

Individual

- MLS All-Star: 2016, 2024
- MLS Fair Play Award: 2016
