= Sebastian Anderson =

American soccer player (born 2002)

Personal information
- Full name: Sebastian Sun Anderson
- Date of birth: August 8, 2002 (age 24)
- Place of birth: Sacramento, California, United States
- Height: 5 ft 10 in (1.78 m)
- Position: Defender

Team information
- Current team: Hartford Athletic
- Number: 2

Youth career
- 2012–2017: Real Colorado
- 2017–2019: Colorado Rapids

Senior career*
Years	Team	Apps	(Gls)
2019–2024	Colorado Rapids	22	(1)
2019–2022	→ Colorado Springs Switchbacks (loan)	36	(0)
2022–2024	→ Colorado Rapids 2	36	(1)
2025–	Hartford Athletic	52	(3)

International career^{‡}
2016–2017	United States U15	4	(0)
2017–2019	United States U17	3	(0)
- * Club domestic league appearances and goals as of November 4, 2026 ‡ National team caps and goals as of September 9, 2019

Sebastian Sun Anderson (born August 8, 2002) is an American professional soccer player who plays as a defender for USL Championship club Hartford Athletic.

== Club career ==
=== Early career and MLS debut ===
Anderson played for Real Colorado's academy from 2012 to 2017. He joined the Colorado Rapids Academy in 2017. On April 3, 2019, Anderson signed a homegrown player contract with the Rapids, becoming the youngest homegrown signing in club history. On April 27, 2019, Anderson made his professional debut for the Rapids in a 1–0 away loss to Atlanta United. Anderson started and played 80 minutes of the match. On July 20, 2019, Anderson scored his first MLS goal in the 6th minute of a 1–2 loss to New York City FC. In the 33rd minute of the match, Anderson was sent off on a straight red card.

=== Loans to Colorado Springs Switchbacks ===
Anderson was loaned to Colorado Springs Switchbacks FC of the USL Championship on Aug. 23. Anderson made three appearances, all of them starts, for Switchbacks FC. Anderson was on the bench for the Rapids' match against Los Angeles FC on Oct. 6.

On February 21, 2020, Anderson was loaned to Switchbacks FC. Anderson played 90 minutes in Switchbacks FC's 2–1 win over Oklahoma City Energy on March 7. Anderson underwent successful knee surgery to repair an anterior tear of his lateral meniscus on June 10.

In March 2021, Anderson re-joined Colorado Springs on loan for the 2021 season.

Anderson was again loaned to the Switchbacks on September 16, 2022.

=== Return to Colorado Rapids ===
Anderson returned to the Rapids ahead of the 2023 season. Across the next two seasons, he moved between the first team and the second team, appearing in 36 matches for Rapids 2 in MLS Next Pro.

At the end of the 2024 season, Colorado Rapids declined his contract option.

=== Hartford Athletic ===
On February 6, 2025, Anderson reuinited with former Colorado Springs Switchbacks manager Brendan Burke, signing for Hartford Athletic in the USL Championship. In July, 2026, Anderson agreed to a two-year contract extension with Hartford.

== International career ==
Anderson has featured for both the United States under-15 national team and United States under-17 national team. In October 2019, he was named to the squad for the 2019 FIFA U-17 World Cup in Brazil.

== Career statistics ==
As of match played October 21, 2023

Appearances and goals by club, season and competition
Club	Season	League			National cup		Continental		Other		Total	
Club	Season	Division	Apps	Goals	Apps	Goals	Apps	Goals	Apps	Goals	Apps	Goals
Colorado Rapids	2019	MLS	6	1	1	0	—		—		7	1
Colorado Rapids	2020	MLS	—		—		—		—		—	
Colorado Rapids	2021	MLS	1	0	—		–		—		1	0
Colorado Rapids	2022	MLS	2	0	1	0	–		—		3	0
Colorado Rapids	2023	MLS	4	0	2	0	–		—		6	0
Colorado Rapids	2024	MLS	0	0	—		–		—		0	0
Colorado Rapids	Total		13	1	4	0	0	0	0	0	17	1
Colorado Springs Switchbacks (loan)	2019	USL	3	0	—		—		—		3	0
Colorado Springs Switchbacks (loan)	2020	USL	1	0	—		—		—		1	0
Colorado Springs Switchbacks (loan)	2021	USL	27	0	–		—		1 (Note: Appearance(s) in USL Cup Playoffs)	0	28	0
Colorado Springs Switchbacks (loan)	2022	USL	5	0	–		—		3	0	8	0
Colorado Springs Switchbacks (loan)	Total		36	0	–		–		4	0	40	0
Colorado Rapids 2 (loan)	2022	MLS Next Pro	13	1	—		—		—		13	1
Colorado Rapids 2 (loan)	2023	MLS Next Pro	15	0	—		—		—		15	0
Colorado Rapids 2 (loan)	Total		28	1	—		—		—		28	1
Career total			77	2	4	0	0	0	4	0	85	2
