= Jack Price (footballer, born 1992) =

English footballer

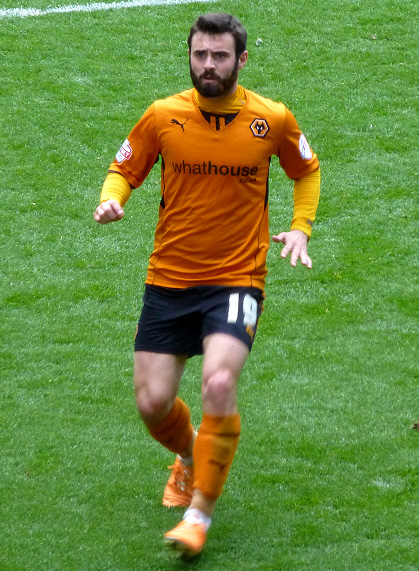
- Price playing for Wolverhampton Wanderers in 2014

Personal information
- Full name: Jack Alexander Price
- Date of birth: 19 December 1992 (age 33)
- Place of birth: Shrewsbury, England
- Height: 1.70 m (5 ft 7 in)
- Position: Midfielder

Team information
- Current team: Shrewsbury Town
- Number: 19

Youth career
- 2001–2011: Wolverhampton Wanderers

Senior career*
Years	Team	Apps	(Gls)
2011–2018	Wolverhampton Wanderers	97	(2)
2014	→ Yeovil Town (loan)	6	(0)
2014	→ Leyton Orient (loan)	5	(0)
2018–2023	Colorado Rapids	123	(2)
2024	Shrewsbury Town	4	(1)
2025–2026	Brackley Town	24	(0)
2026–	Shrewsbury Town	0	(0)
- * Club domestic league appearances and goals as of 11:30, 6 February 2026 (UTC)

Jack Alexander Price (born 19 December 1992) is an English professional footballer who plays as a midfielder for EFL League Two club Shrewsbury Town.

He began his career at Wolverhampton Wanderers, playing 115 total games and also having loans at Yeovil Town and Leyton Orient in 2014. He won League One with Wolves in the same year. In 2018, he signed for Colorado Rapids. Since then, he has been MVP for four consecutive years and beat David Beckham's record of most assists from set pieces in one season.

== Career ==
=== Wolverhampton Wanderers ===
==== Early years and League One ====
Born in Shrewsbury, England, Price joined Wolverhampton Wanderers, where he started out as a winger before switching to central–midfield at 14. Price progressed from the academy at Wolverhampton Wanderers, signing a professional contract in 2011. On 24 March 2012, in the Premier League against Norwich City, Price appeared as an unused substitute, in a 2–1 loss. At the end of the 2011–12 season, Wolves took up the option of a contract extension that would ensure Price remained under contract for the 2012–13 season. For the rest of the 2012–13 season, Price played for the reserve side.

Ahead of the 2013–14 season, Price was amongst several youngsters to be promoted to the first team squad by new Manager Kenny Jackett. The midfielder made his senior debut on 10 August 2013, coming on as a substitute in a 4–0 win against Gillingham. It was not until on 30 September 2013 that he made his first start for the club, playing the whole game, in a 2–0 win over Sheffield United. After the match, Manager Jackett praised Price's performance, describing him as "the team's best player". He appeared in the next four matches throughout October before suffering a migraine problems that kept him out for three weeks. He later suffered knee ligament damage during a 1–1 draw against Leyton Orient on 29 December 2013 and was sidelined for four weeks. He then returned from injury on 25 January 2014, where he set up one of the goals, in a 3–1 win over Bristol City. Later in the 2013–14 season, Price regained his first team place and went on to be a regular member of the team that won the League One title. His performances during 2013–14 resulted in him signing a two–year contract. By the end of the 2013–14 season, Price had made a total of 30 appearances in all competitions.

==== Loans and Championship ====
In the 2014–15 season, Price found himself out of the first team, slipping down the pecking order following the arrival of Tommy Rowe and George Saville, together with strong performances from Lee Evans and Kevin McDonald. On 1 September, he moved on a one-month loan to League One side Yeovil Town. He made his debut five days later, setting up one of the goals in a 3–1 win over Bradford City. He then set up another goal for the side on 13 September, when they lost 2–1 to Coventry City. He made seven appearances in total for Yeovil before returning to his parent club in early October.

Shortly afterwards, Price was loaned to another League One team, joining Leyton Orient on 7 October 2014 on a three-month loan deal. Price made his Leyton Orient debut, playing the whole game, in a 2–2 draw against Sheffield United four days after signing for the club. However, during a 2–0 win over Doncaster Rovers on 21 October, he suffered an ankle injury, forcing him to return to his parent club. Despite this, he made two more appearances at Leyton Orient before being recalled by Wolves on 3 December. By the time he was recalled, Price had made a total of five appearances for Orient.

Having returned to Wolves, Price made his Championship debut as a late substitute in a 1–0 victory at Sheffield Wednesday on 13 December 2014. He quickly forced his way into the side, regularly partnering the ever-present Kevin McDonald in midfield as Wolves surged towards the end of season play-offs, ultimately just falling short on goal difference. He scored his first Wolves goal, and indeed first senior goal, when he diverted a Kortney Hause strike past Heurelho Gomes in a 2–2 draw with Watford on 7 March 2015. By the end of the 2014–15 season, he had made a total of 26 appearances, scoring once in all competitions.

Ahead of the 2015–16 season, Price signed a new contract running until the summer of 2019, with the club holding the option of a further year. He began the 2015–16 season on the substitutes bench. He made his first appearance of the season starting and playing the whole game in a 1–1 draw against Preston North End on 26 September 2015. Following this, Price regained his place in the first team though he often found himself competing with Conor Coady for a midfield position. Numerous injury concerns caused, Price to be in and out of the first team over the 2nd half of the season. He scored his first goal of the season on 5 April 2016, in a 2–1 win over Milton Keynes Dons. Despite only making 27 appearances and scoring once in all competitions for the 2015–16 season, Price was named the fans' player of the season.

In the 2016–17 season, Price featured less often under the new management of Walter Zenga frequently being on the substitutes bench. Despite this, he played a vital role when he set up Joe Mason to score the equaliser, in a 3–1 win over Birmingham City on 20 August 2016. After not playing for two months, Price was recalled to the first team by manager Paul Lambert. However, Price made only a handful of first team appearances under him. His first team opportunities became limited, due to injury concerns. Despite this, Price finished the 2016–17 season having made a total of 23 appearances in all competitions.

In the 2017–18 season, Price was placed on a transfer list by Manager Lambert and later, his successor, Nuno. Price found himself out of the first team under Nuno. Despite this, Price signed a contract extension with the club in October 2017. Price started all four matches in the club's campaign in the EFL Cup until their elimination against Manchester City in the last 16. In early January 2018, the club accepted a bid from Colorado Rapids for Price. By the time of his departure, he had made 9 appearances. During his time at Wolverhampton Wanderers, Price became a fan favourite, due to "being remembered as a cult hero and a wholehearted and committed player who cared dearly for the club he'd been at since aged seven."

=== Colorado Rapids ===
On 8 January 2018, Price joined Major League Soccer side Colorado Rapids. The move was reported to be for an undisclosed fee, signing a four–year contract with the side. Upon joining the club, Price spoke out about the move, saying: "I've been at Wolves for my entire footballing life so it's played a huge part in my career. I've played with some fantastic players and worked with some brilliant staff. Of course, a part of me is sad to leave the club after so many years, but the time is right for a new challenge and I'm really looking forward to my next step."

Price made his debut on 20 February in the first leg of the last 16 of the CONCACAF Champions League, playing the full 90 minutes of a 2–0 home loss to Toronto FC. On 10 March, he played his first league game and had a penalty saved by Matt Turner in a 2–1 loss away to the New England Revolution. He played 31 times in his first season as the Rapids missed the playoffs, and scored once on 14 April in 78 seconds to open a 2–0 win over Toronto at Dick's Sporting Goods Park.

Price was again a regular in 2019 as Colorado again missed postseason, and on 20 April he was shown a straight red card at the end of a 4–1 loss at Chicago Fire FC for a foul on Brandt Bronico. Price led Colorado with 11 assists in 2019, including 10 off set pieces, which were the most in MLS since 2010, passing David Beckham and Graham Zusi. Colorado scored 19 goals off set pieces in 2019, by far the most in the league.

The following year, he succeeded the retired Tim Howard as captain, and in March signed a contract to 2022 with the option of a further season. Price made 14 starts among 16 regular season appearances, collecting five assists, which was tied with Cole Bassett for the team lead. Price also played a full 90 minutes in Colorado's first-round playoff loss at Minnesota United FC. Price was named Team MVP.

On 26 October 2023, Colorado announced that they had declined their contract option on Price.

=== Shrewsbury Town ===
On 13 March 2024, Price signed for League One club Shrewsbury Town on a deal until the end of the season.

=== Brackley Town ===
In June 2025, Price joined newly promoted National League side Brackley Town.

== Personal life ==
Price was born in Shrewsbury, Shropshire. He attended Sundorne School. Price is married to his wife, Lauren, and they have a son named Hugo.

== Career statistics ==
As of 21 October 2023

Appearances and goals by club, season and competition
Club	Season	League			National cup (Note: Includes FA Cup and U.S. Open Cup)		League cup (Note: Includes EFL Cup)		Continental		Other		Total	
Club	Season	Division	Apps	Goals	Apps	Goals	Apps	Goals	Apps	Goals	Apps	Goals	Apps	Goals
Wolverhampton Wanderers	2011–12	Premier League	0	0	0	0	0	0	–		–		0	0
Wolverhampton Wanderers	2012–13	Championship	0	0	0	0	0	0	–		–		0	0
Wolverhampton Wanderers	2013–14	League One	26	0	2	0	0	0	–		2 (Note: Appearance(s) in Football League Trophy)	0	30	0
Wolverhampton Wanderers	2014–15	Championship	23	1	2	0	1	0	–		–		26	1
Wolverhampton Wanderers	2015–16	Championship	24	1	0	0	3	0	–		–		27	1
Wolverhampton Wanderers	2016–17	Championship	19	0	1	0	3	0	–		–		23	0
Wolverhampton Wanderers	2017–18	Championship	5	0	0	0	4	0	–		–		9	0
Wolverhampton Wanderers	Total		97	2	5	0	11	0	0	0	2	0	115	2
Yeovil Town (loan)	2014–15	League One	6	0	0	0	0	0	–		1	0	7	0
Leyton Orient (loan)	2014–15	League One	5	0	0	0	0	0	–		0	0	5	0
Colorado Rapids	2018	Major League Soccer	31	1	1	0	–		2 (Note: Appearances in CONCACAF Champions League)	0	–		34	1
Colorado Rapids	2019	Major League Soccer	27	1	0	0	–		–		0	0	27	1
Colorado Rapids	2020	Major League Soccer	16	0	–		–		–		1 (Note: Appearances in MLS Cup Playoffs)	0	17	0
Colorado Rapids	2021	Major League Soccer	30	0	–		–		–		1	0	31	0
Colorado Rapids	2022	Major League Soccer	17	0	0	0	–		2	0	0	0	19	0
Colorado Rapids	2023	Major League Soccer	2	0	0	0	–		–		0	0	2	0
Colorado Rapids	Total		123	2	1	0	0	0	4	0	2	0	130	2
Shrewsbury Town	2023–24	League One	2	1	0	0	0	0	0	0	0	0	2	1
Career total			233	5	6	0	11	0	4	0	5	0	258	5

== Honours ==
Wolverhampton Wanderers

- Football League One: 2013–14
