= Sam Raben =

American soccer player

Personal information
- Full name: Sam Raben
- Date of birth: May 11, 1997 (age 29)
- Place of birth: Birmingham, Alabama, United States
- Height: 6 ft 6 in (1.98 m)
- Position: Defender

Youth career
- 2010–2013: Colorado Storm
- 2014–2015: Colorado Rapids

College career
Years	Team	Apps	(Gls)
2015–2018	Wake Forest Demon Deacons	91	(0)

Senior career*
Years	Team	Apps	(Gls)
2017–2018	Colorado Rapids U-23	15	(0)
2019	Colorado Rapids	0	(0)
2019	→ Colorado Springs Switchbacks (loan)	8	(0)
2020	Sporting Kansas City II	7	(1)
- * Club domestic league appearances and goals as of October 6, 2020

Sam Raben
Medal record

Representing United States

Football

Maccabiah Games
Gold medal – first place	2017 Maccabiah	Football

Sam Raben (born May 11, 1997) is an American soccer player who plays as a defender. He won a gold medal with Team USA in the 2017 Maccabiah Games in Israel. Before turning pro, he played two seasons in the Premier Development League with Colorado Rapids U-23. In January 2019 the Colorado Rapids of Major League Soccer signed Raben to a guaranteed contract.

== Early life ==
Raben was born in Birmingham, Alabama, to David and Carrie Raben, and is Jewish. His father is an oncologist at the University of Colorado. His sister Lizzy played soccer for Duke University. His hometown is Greenwood Village, Colorado.

== Soccer career ==
Raben plays soccer as a defender. He attended Cherry Creek High School. He was second team All-State and All-Conference in 2012.

He played for Wake Forest University. Raben made 91 starts for Wake Forest, tied for third-most in school history. In 2018, he was named third team All-ACC and third team All-South Region by United Soccer Coaches.

Raben played center back in soccer for Team USA in the 2017 Maccabiah Games in Israel, winning a gold medal. He was on the Jewish Sports Review 2017 Division 1 Men's Soccer All-America Team, along with Jake Rozhansky and Harry Swartz.

Before turning pro, Raben played two seasons in the Premier Development League with Colorado Rapids U-23.

In January 2019, the Colorado Rapids of Major League Soccer signed Raben to a guaranteed contract.

On February 26, 2020, Raben signed with USL Championship side Sporting Kansas City II after going on trial with them in the preseason. Raben was released by Sporting Kansas City on November 30, 2020.
