= 2022 Portland Timbers season =

Portland Timbers
2022 season
- President: Merritt Paulson
- Head coach: Giovanni Savarese
- Stadium: Providence Park; Portland, Oregon (Capacity: 25,218)
- Major League Soccer: Conference: 8th Overall: 15th
- U.S. Open Cup: Round of 32
- Top goalscorer: League: Dairon Asprilla (10); All: Dairon Asprilla (10)
- Highest home attendance: 24,534 (4/3 v. LAG)
- Lowest home attendance: 22,228 (5/22 v. PHI)
- Average home league attendance: 23,341
- Biggest win: POR 7–2 SKC (5/14)
- Biggest defeat: DAL 4–1 POR (3/19)
Primary colors	Secondary colors

The 2022 Portland Timbers season was the club's 36th season of existence and the 12th season for the Portland Timbers in Major League Soccer (MLS), the top-flight professional soccer league in the United States and Canada. The season covers the period from the end of the Timbers' last match in MLS Cup 2021 to the team's end of the season in October 2022.

== Background ==
The Timbers finished fourth in the Western Conference in the 2021 MLS season, advancing to the MLS Cup Final (which they hosted) where they lost on penalties to New York City FC.

Most of the season focused on fan discontent, with many supporters withholding season ticket pledges and attendance lagging—partially due to the lasting effects of the COVID-19 pandemic and cost-cutting, but also due to a large-scale abuse scandal coming from the NWSL and sister club Portland Thorns, which directly impacted the Timbers organization.

After a report commissioned by U.S. Soccer dropped on October 3, even more fan pressure began to mount. The report named the three men at the helm of the Timbers/Thorns organization as part of the problems brought about in the scandal: club owner Merritt Paulson, Timbers GM Gavin Wilkinson (who also held the same role for the Thorns until stepping aside in 2021), and president Mike Golub. The report cited Wilkinson's treatment of a former Thorns player and endorsement of disgraced ex-coach Paul Riley—who was accused of sexual abuse by multiple players—as well as Golub's sexually inappropriate conduct toward another former Thorns coach and Paulson's failure to act upon these accusations. The report led to Paulson stating he would recuse himself, Wilkinson and Golub of Thorns duties. On October 5, the club fired both Wilkinson and Golub, with Ned Grabavoy assuming Timbers roster decisions in the interim.

The Timbers were in position at the final matchday to qualify for the playoffs, but held off qualification to the final matchday due to losing at home against Los Angeles FC (which helped LAFC clinch the Supporters' Shield). They were eliminated by Real Salt Lake in the last game of the season following a 3–1 defeat at America First Field, finishing the season on 46 points, one fewer than RSL.

== Roster ==
No.	Name	Nat	Positions	Since	Date of birth (age)	Signed from	Games	Goals	Assists
Goalkeepers
1	David Bingham	(United States)	GK	2022	August 19, 1989 (age 37)	(United States) LA Galaxy	2	0	0
31	Aljaž Ivačič	(Slovenia)	GK	2019	December 29, 1993 (age 32)	(Slovenia) NK Olimpija Ljubljana	32	0	0
41	Justin Vom Steeg	(United States)	GK	2022	April 5, 1997 (age 29)	(United States) LA Galaxy	0	0	0
Defenders
5	Claudio Bravo	(Argentina)	LB	2020	March 13, 1997 (age 29)	(Argentina) Banfield	26	0	2
14	Justin Rasmussen	(United States)	LB	2022	December 15, 1998 (age 27)	(United States) Grand Canyon University	9	0	0
13	Dario Zuparic	(Croatia)	CB	2020	May 3, 1992 (age 34)	(Croatia) HNK Rijeka	30	0	0
18	Zac McGraw	(Canada)	CB	2020	June 8, 1997 (age 29)	(United States) Army	22	1	0
33	Larrys Mabiala	(Democratic Republic of the Congo)	CB	2017	October 8, 1987 (age 39)	(Turkey) Kayserispor	21	0	1
25	Bill Tuiloma	(New Zealand)	CB	2017	March 25, 1995 (age 31)	(France) Marseille	30	6	2
2	Josecarlos Van Rankin (L)	(Mexico)	RB	2021	May 14, 1993 (age 33)	(Mexico) Guadalajara	24	1	0
28	Pablo Bonilla	(Venezuela)	RB	2020	December 2, 1999 (age 26)	(Venezuela) Deportivo La Guaira	6	0	0
29	Juan David Mosquera	(Colombia)	RB	2022	September 5, 2002 (age 24)	(Colombia) Independiente Medellín	3	0	0
Midfielders
20	George Fochive	(United States)	DM	2021	March 24, 1992 (age 34)	(Israel) Bnei Yehuda	2	0	0
21	Diego Chara	(Colombia)	DM	2011	April 5, 1986 (age 40)	(Colombia) Deportes Tolima	28	0	2
24	David Ayala	(Argentina)	DM	2022	April 26, 2002 (age 24)	(Argentina) Estudiantes	21	0	0
22	Cristhian Paredes	(Paraguay)	DM	2018	May 18, 1998 (age 28)	(Mexico) América	27	2	2
19	Eryk Williamson	(United States)	CM	2018	June 11, 1997 (age 29)	(United States) Maryland Terrapins	22	0	5
30	Santiago Moreno	(Colombia)	W	2021	April 21, 2000 (age 26)	(Colombia) América de Cali	34	7	6
98	Blake Bodily (HG)	(United States)	W	2020	January 13, 1998 (age 28)	(United States) Portland Timbers 2	3	0	0
16	Diego Gutierrez	(United States)	W	2022	January 5, 1999 (age 27)	(United States) Creighton Bluejays	1	0	0
44	Marvin Loría	(Costa Rica)	W	2019	April 24, 1997 (age 29)	(Costa Rica) Saprissa	28	2	1
10	Sebastián Blanco (DP)	(Argentina)	AM	2017	March 15, 1988 (age 38)	(Argentina) San Lorenzo	32	7	7
Forwards
23	Yimmi Chará (DP)	(Colombia)	W	2020	April 2, 1991 (age 35)	(Brazil) Atlético Mineiro	34	4	3
27	Dairon Asprilla	(Colombia)	W/ST	2015	May 25, 1992 (age 34)	(Colombia) Atlético Nacional	29	10	2
99	Nathan Fogaça	(Brazil)	ST	2022	June 9, 1999 (age 27)	(Brazil) Coritiba	11	2	0
9	Felipe Mora (SEIL)	(Chile)	ST	2020	August 2, 1993 (age 33)	(Mexico) Pumas UNAM	7	1	0
11	Jarosław Niezgoda (DP)	(Poland)	ST	2020	March 15, 1995 (age 31)	(Poland) Legia Warsaw	30	9	2
17	Tega Ikoba (HG)	(United States)	ST	2022	August 14, 2003 (age 23)	(United States) Portland Timbers 2	2	0	0

- (HG) = Homegrown Player
- (GA) = Generation Adidas Player
- (DP) = Designated Player
- (L) = On Loan to the Timbers
- (LO) = Loaned out to another club
- (SEIL) = Season-ending Injury List

== Player and staff transactions ==
=== In ===
Date	Position	Player	Previous club	TAM	GAM	Notes	Source
January 25, 2022	GK	(United States) Justin Vom Steeg	(United States) LA Galaxy II				
February 1, 2022	MF	(Argentina) David Ayala	(Argentina) Estudiantes				
February 17, 2022	DF	(United States) Justin Rasmussen	(United States) Grand Canyon Antelopes			2022 MLS SuperDraft pick	
February 25, 2022	FW	(United States) Diego Gutierrez	(United States) Creighton			2021 MLS SuperDraft pick	
May 5, 2022	FW	(Brazil) Nathan Fogaça	(United States) Portland Timbers 2				
July 27, 2022	DF	(Colombia) Juan David Mosquera	(Colombia) Independiente Medellín				

=== Out ===
Date	Position	Player	Destination club	TAM	GAM	Notes	Source
January 21, 2022	GK	(United States) Jeff Attinella	N/A	N/A	N/A	Retired	
December 13, 2021	MF	(Spain) Jorge Gonzales	Louisville City FC	N/A	N/A	Declined Option	
December 13, 2021	DF/MF	(The Gambia) Ismaila Jome	Portland Timbers 2	N/A	N/A	Declined Option	
December 13, 2021	MF	(United States) Manny Perez	Louisville City FC	N/A	N/A	Declined Option	
January 20, 2022	MF	(Argentina) Diego Valeri	Club Atlético Lanús	N/A	N/A	Mutual Agreement	
February 10, 2022	ST / W	(Peru) Andy Polo	Club Universitario de Deportes	N/A	N/A	Contract Terminated	

1. Andy Polo's contract was terminated in response to domestic violence allegations.

=== 2022 MLS SuperDraft picks ===
Round	Position	Player	College	Other club	Notes	Source
1 (27)	(United States) Justin Rasmussen	DF	Grand Canyon	Orange County SC U-23		
2 (55)	(United States) Julian Bravo	DF	Santa Clara	FC Golden State		
3 (83)	(Norway) Sivert Haugli	DF	Virginia Tech	Des Moines Menace		

== Non-competitive ==
=== Preseason friendlies ===
The Timbers began their preseason on January 18, 2022. On January 26, 2022, the Timbers announced that the club will host a Preseason Tournament.

January 26 Desert Showcase	Seattle Sounders FC	0–0	Portland Timbers	Tucson, Arizona
6:00 PM PST		Report		Stadium: Kino Sports Complex
Note: This match was originally scheduled to have the Sounders competing with Real Salt Lake but RSL opted out of the match, citing scheduling conflicts and technical considerations. Real Salt Lake will instead compete later in February in another tournament hosted by the Timbers.

February 3	Portland Timbers	2–2	Sporting Kansas City	Chandler, Arizona
10:00 AM PST	Quinn 51'; McGraw (yellow card) 79'; Mora 90+1'	POR Report; SKC Tweet	Isimat-Mirin 18'; Russell 34'; Ndenbe (yellow card) 48'; Freeman (yellow card) 57'; Hernández (yellow card) 90'	Stadium: Phoenix Rising Soccer Complex at Wild Horse Pass

February 13	Portland Timbers	1–0	Minnesota United FC	Portland, Oregon
12:00 PM PST	Moreno 5'	Report		Stadium: Providence Park

February 16	Portland Timbers	1–3	Viking FK	Portland, Oregon
7:30 PM PST	Rasmussen 45+1'	Report	Løkberg 11', 36'; Berisha 71'	Stadium: Providence Park; Attendance: 7,169

February 19	Portland Timbers	3–0	Real Salt Lake	Portland, Oregon
5:00 PM PST	Paredes 72'; Niezgoda 74' (pen.); Tuiloma 90+2'	Report		Stadium: Providence Park

Win Draw Loss Upcoming fixture

== Competitions ==
=== Major League Soccer ===
==== Standings ====
===== Western Conference =====
Pos	Team	Pld	W	L	T	GF	GA	GD	Pts	Qualification
6	Minnesota United FC	34	14	14	6	48	51	−3	48	Qualification for the first round
7	Real Salt Lake	34	12	11	11	43	45	−2	47	Qualification for the first round
8	Portland Timbers	34	11	10	13	53	53	0	46	
9	Vancouver Whitecaps FC (Note: Canadian clubs could not qualify for the 2023 CONCACAF Champions League through the MLS regular season or playoffs.)	34	12	15	7	40	57	−17	43	Qualification for the CONCACAF Champions League (Note: as 2022 Canadian Championship winners.)
10	Colorado Rapids	34	11	13	10	46	57	−11	43	

Source: MLS
Rules for classification: 1) points; 2) total wins; 3) total goal differential; 4) total goals scored; 5) fewer disciplinary points; 6) away goal differential; 7) away goals scored; 8) home goals differential; 9) home goals scored; 10) coin toss (2 clubs tied) or drawing of lots (≥3 clubs tied)

===== Overall =====
Pos	Team	Pld	W	L	T	GF	GA	GD	Pts	
13	Orlando City SC (U)	34	14	14	6	44	53	−9	48	Qualification for the CONCACAF Champions League (Note: As 2022 U.S. Open Cup champions (USA4))
14	Real Salt Lake	34	12	11	11	43	45	−2	47	
15	Portland Timbers	34	11	10	13	53	53	0	46	
16	Columbus Crew	34	10	8	16	46	41	+5	46	
17	Vancouver Whitecaps FC (Note: Canadian clubs could not qualify for the 2023 CONCACAF Champions League through the MLS regular season or playoffs.) (V)	34	12	15	7	40	57	−17	43	Qualification for the CONCACAF Champions League (Note: As 2022 Canadian Championship winners (CAN1))

Source: MLS
Rules for classification: 1) points; 2) total wins; 3) total goal differential; 4) total goals scored; 5) fewer disciplinary points; 6) away goal differential; 7) away goals scored; 8) home goals differential; 9) home goals scored; 10) coin toss (2 clubs tied) or drawing of lots (≥3 clubs tied)
(U) U.S. Open Cup winners; (V) Canadian Championship winners

===== Matches =====
All matches are in Pacific time

February 26 1	Portland Timbers	2–2	New England Revolution	Portland, Oregon
4:30 PM PT	Van Rankin (yellow card) 22'; Asprilla (yellow card) 28', (goal) 60'; Tuiloma (yellow card) 53'; Y. Chará 78'; Bravo (yellow card) 84'	Report	Bye 41'; Lletget 63'; McNamara (yellow card) 70'; Polster (yellow card) 76'	Stadium: Providence Park; Attendance: 23,411; Referee: Chris Penso

March 6 2	Los Angeles FC	1–1	Portland Timbers	Los Angeles, California
7:00 PM PT	Hollingshead (yellow card) 25'; Sánchez (yellow card) 78'; Fall 90+3'	Report	Y. Chará 18'; Bravo (yellow card) 36' (yellow-red card) 62'; Asprilla (yellow card) 39'; Van Rankin (yellow card) 45+3'; Fochive (yellow card) 65'; D. Chará (yellow card) 90+2'	Stadium: Banc of California Stadium; Attendance: 22,102; Referee: Ismail Elfath

March 12 3	Portland Timbers	1–0	Austin FC	Portland, Oregon
7:30 PM PT	Y. Chara (yellow card) 53'; Paredes (yellow card) 57'; Tuiloma 62'; Blanco (yellow card) 90+6'	Report	Cecilio Domínguez (yellow card) 49'; Kolmanič (yellow card) 50'; Driussi (yellow card) 50'; Pereira (yellow card) 60'	Stadium: Providence Park; Attendance: 22,795; Referee: Joseph Dickerson

March 19 4	FC Dallas	4–1	Portland Timbers	Frisco, Texas
5:30 PM PT	Ferreira 26', 30', 36'; Velasco (yellow card) 44'; Nanu (yellow card) 76'; Arriola 77'	Report	Niezgoda 61'	Stadium: Toyota Stadium (Texas); Attendance: 19,096; Referee: Allen Chapman

March 27 5	Portland Timbers	1–1	Orlando City SC	Portland, Oregon
1:00 PM PT	Bravo (yellow card) 65'; Van Rankin (yellow card) 71' (yellow-red card) 76'; Paredes 80', (yellow card) 81'; Bodily (yellow card) 90+4'	Report	Urso 52'; Michel (yellow card) 90+4'; Jansson (yellow card) 90+5'	Stadium: Providence Park; Attendance: 22,948; Referee: Marcos de Oliviera

April 3 6	Portland Timbers	1–3	LA Galaxy	Portland, Oregon
1:00 PM PT	Bonilla (red card) 45+3'; Blanco (yellow card) 48'; Tuiloma 51'; D. Chará (yellow card) 90+2'	Report	Hernández 9', 59', (yellow card) 57'; Tuiloma 16' (o.g.); Raveloson (yellow card) 45+4'; DePuy (yellow card) 48'; Delgado (yellow card) 50' (yellow-red card) 61'	Stadium: Providence Park; Attendance: 24,534; Referee: Nima Saghafi

April 9 7 Cascadia Cup	Vancouver Whitecaps FC	2–3	Portland Timbers	Vancouver, British Columbia
7:00 PM (PDT)	Dájome 76', (penalty missed) 88'; Gauld 90+6' (pen.)	Report	Mabiala (yellow card) 6'; Van Rankin (yellow card) 17'; Asprilla 42' (pen.), (yellow card) 43'; Niezgoda 60'; Y. Chará 78'; Bravo (yellow card) 90+3'	Stadium: BC Place; Attendance: 16,772; Referee: Silviu Petrescu

April 16 8	Houston Dynamo	0–0	Portland Timbers	Houston, Texas
5:00 PM CDT	Hadebe (yellow card) 26' (yellow-red card) 75'	Report	Paredes (yellow card) 16'; Blanco (yellow card) 26'; Y. Chará (yellow card) 49'; Tuiloma (yellow card) 81'	Stadium: PNC Stadium; Attendance: 13,650; Referee: Rosendo Mendoza

April 23 9	Portland Timbers	0–0	Real Salt Lake	Portland, Oregon
7:00 PM PDT	Bravo (yellow card) 77'; Mabiala (yellow card) 86'; Paredes (yellow card) 90+'	Report		Stadium: Providence Park; Attendance: 24,206; Referee: Chris Penso

April 30 10	Colorado Rapids	2–0	Portland Timbers	Commerce City, Colorado
6:00 PM PDT	Max (yellow card) 17'; Rubio 30', (yellow card) 45+3' (yellow-red card) 63'; Abubakar (yellow card) 38'; Beitashour (yellow card) 46'; Trusty (yellow card) 66'; Yarbrough (yellow card) 90+3'; Kaye 90+5'	Report	Williamson (yellow card) 29'; Mabiala (yellow card) 29'; Ivačič (yellow card) 66'; Van Rankin (yellow card) 73'	Stadium: Dick's Sporting Goods Park; Attendance: 14,038; Referee: Armando Villareal

May 7 11	New York Red Bulls	1–1	Portland Timbers	Harrison, New Jersey
4:00 PM PDT	Long 67'; Cásseres Jr. (yellow card) 90+2'	Report	Williamson (yellow card) 46'; Niezgoda 53'	Stadium: Red Bull Arena; Attendance: 17,107; Referee: Joseph Dickerson

May 14 12	Portland Timbers	7–2	Sporting Kansas City	Portland, Oregon
7:00 PM PDT	Tuiloma 12', (yellow card) 72'; Blanco 46', 52'; Fogaça 56', 69'; Van Rankin (yellow card) 64' (yellow-red card) 74'; D. Chará (yellow card) 86'; Loría 88'; Moreno 90+2'	Report	Espinoza (yellow card) 18'; Voloder (yellow card) 35' (yellow-red card) 78'; Russell 57'; Tzionis 75'	Stadium: Providence Park; Attendance: 23,503; Referee: Victor Rivas

May 18 13	San Jose Earthquakes	3–2	Portland Timbers	San Jose, California
7:30 PM PDT	Yueill 31'; Monteiro 44', 80'; Remedi (yellow card) 59'; M. Lopez (yellow card) 66'	Report	Paredes 18'; Župarić (yellow card) 35'; Tuiloma 56'; Rasmussen (yellow card) 70'; Williamson (yellow card) 90+5'	Stadium: PayPal Park; Attendance: 11,788; Referee: Lukasz Szpala

May 22 14	Portland Timbers	0–2	Philadelphia Union	Portland, Oregon
7:00 PM PDT	D. Chará (yellow card) 43'	Report	Gazdag 5'; Harriel (yellow card) 18'; Santos 48'; Carranza (yellow card) 81'; Burke (yellow card) 85'	Stadium: Providence Park; Attendance: 22,288; Referee: Allen Chapman

May 28 15	Inter Miami CF	2–1	Portland Timbers	Fort Lauderdale, FL
8:00PM EDT	Duke (yellow card) 14'; Campana 27'; Taylor 59'; Callender (yellow card) 88'; Higuaín (yellow card) 90+1'	Report	Paredes (yellow card) 27'; Mabiala (yellow card) 35'; Župarić (yellow card) 64'; Tuiloma 78'	Stadium: DRV PNK Stadium; Attendance: 11,161; Referee: Chris Penso

June 18 16	LA Galaxy	1–1	Portland Timbers	Carson, California
2:00PM PDT	DePuy (yellow card) 37'; Grandsir (yellow card) 58'; Joveljić 88', (yellow card) 89'	Report	Mabiala (yellow card) 10'; Chará 38'; Fogaça (yellow card) 76'	Stadium: Dignity Health Sports Park; Attendance: 21,414; Referee: Joe Dickerson

June 25 17	Portland Timbers	3–0	Colorado Rapids	Portland, Oregon
7:30 PM PDT	Chará (yellow card) 27'; Blanco 45+8' (pen.); Niezgoda 54', 62'	Report	Yarbrough (yellow card) 45+6'; Esteves (yellow card) 84'; Toure (yellow card) 90'	Stadium: Providence Park; Attendance: 23,448; Referee: Rosendo Mendoza

June 29 18	Portland Timbers	2–1	Houston Dynamo FC	Portland, Oregon
7:30 PM PDT	Blanco (yellow card) 17'; Župarić (yellow card) 27'; Moreno 34' (pen.), 36', (yellow card) 42'; Tuiloma (yellow card) 54' (yellow-red card) 75'; Williamson (yellow card) 72'	Report	Rodríguez (yellow card) 21'; Zeca (yellow card) 34'; Hadebe (yellow card) 44'; Quintero 65'; Vera (yellow card) 69'	Stadium: Providence Park; Attendance: 22,932; Referee: Lukasz Szpala

July 3 19	Nashville SC	2–2	Portland Timbers	Nashville, Tennessee
5:30 PM PDT	Davis 18'; Mukhtar 57'; Zimmerman (yellow card) 77'	Report	Ayala (yellow card) 28'; McGraw (yellow card) 51'; Asprilla 64' (pen.); Niezgoda 69'	Stadium: Geodis Park; Attendance: 28,387; Referee: Armando Villarreal

July 9 20 Cascadia Cup	Seattle Sounders FC	0–3	Portland Timbers	Seattle, Washington
1:30 PM PDT	Ragen (yellow card) 45+2' (yellow-red card) 46'; Roldan (yellow card) 70'; Tolo (yellow card) 81'	Report	Williamson (yellow card) 6'; Niezgoda 24'; Y. Chará (yellow card) 57'; Moreno 82' (pen.); Asprilla 85', (yellow card) 85'; D. Chará (yellow card) 87'	Stadium: Lumen Field; Attendance: 47,722; Referee: Chris Penso

July 17 21	Portland Timbers	1–1	Vancouver Whitecaps FC	Portland, Oregon
7:30 PM (PDT)	Van Rankin (yellow card) 44'; Mora 82' (pen.); Župarić (yellow card) 84'; Blanco (yellow card) 90'	Report	White 32'; Cavallini (yellow card) 46'; Raposo (yellow card) 48'	Stadium: Providence Park; Attendance: 24,337; Referee: Ramy Touchan

July 23 22	Portland Timbers	2–1	San Jose Earthquakes	Portland, Oregon
7:30 PM PDT	Van Rankin (yellow card) 39'; Y. Chará (yellow card) 40'; Bravo (yellow card) 41'; Niezgoda 53'; Asprilla (yellow card) 67', (goal) 71'	Report	Kikanovic 42'; Nathan (yellow card) 49'; Remedi (yellow card) 53'; Yueill (yellow card) 78'	Stadium: Providence Park; Attendance: 23,795; Referee: Jon Freemon

July 30 23	Minnesota United FC	4–4	Portland Timbers	St. Paul, Minnesota
12:00 PM PDT	Fragapane 9'; Hlongwane 21'; Amarilla 41', 69'; Boxall (yellow card) 53'; Arriaga (yellow card) 72'; Benítez (yellow card) 75'; Reynoso (yellow card) 90'; Lod (yellow card) 90+3'	Report	Blanco 1', 50'; D. Chará (yellow card) 18'; Niezgoda 53'; Y. Chara (yellow card) 62'; Lawrence 65' (o.g.); Ayala (yellow card) 73'; Asprilla (yellow card) 83'	Stadium: Allianz Field; Attendance: 19,792; Referee: Victor Rivas

August 3 24	Portland Timbers	1–1	Nashville SC	Portland, Oregon
7:30 PM PDT	Moreno 27'; McGraw (yellow card) 90'	Report	Bunbury 20', (yellow card) 67'; Zimmerman (yellow card) 45+1'; Mukhtar (yellow card) 59'	Stadium: Providence Park; Attendance: 23,101; Referee: Silviu Petrescu

August 6 25	Portland Timbers	1–1	FC Dallas	Portland, Oregon
7:30PM PDT	Asprilla (yellow card) 24'; Williamson (yellow card) 78'; Loria (penalty missed) 90+6', 90+6'	Report	Twumasi (yellow card) 74'; Hedges (yellow card) 90+5'; Chará 90+10' (o.g.)	Stadium: Providence Park; Attendance: 24,114; Referee: Ted Unkel

August 13 26	Toronto FC	3–1	Portland Timbers	Toronto, Ontario
4:30 PM PDT	MacNaughton (yellow card) 14'; Osorio 41', (yellow card) 68'; Mavinga (yellow card) 67'; Insigne 79'; Bernardeschi 85', (yellow card) 87'	Report	Van Rankin 73'	Stadium: BMO Field; Attendance: 28,598; Referee: Nima Saghafi

August 21 27	Sporting Kansas City	4–1	Portland Timbers	Kansas City, Kansas
4:55 PM PDT	Agada 31', 75'; Fontàs 40'; Thommy 42'; Sweat (yellow card) 78'	Report	McGraw (yellow card) 57'; D. Chará (yellow card) 86'; Blanco 90'	Stadium: Children's Mercy Park; Attendance: 17,348; Referee: Armando Villarreal

August 26 28 Cascadia Cup	Portland Timbers	2–1	Seattle Sounders FC	Portland, Oregon
7:00 PM PDT	Blanco (yellow card) 11'; Asprilla 41'; Williamson (yellow card) 45+2'; Blanco 51'; McGraw (yellow card) 78'	Report	Yeimar 8'; Lodeiro (yellow card) 20'; Leyva (yellow card) 23'	Stadium: Providence Park; Attendance: 25,218; Referee: Geoff Gamble

August 31 29	Austin FC	1–2	Portland Timbers	Austin, Texas
6:00 PM PDT	Urruti (yellow card) 30'; Perreira (yellow card) 45+5'; Ring (yellow card) 65'; Driussi 79'	Report	Tuiloma 16'; Župarić (yellow card) 42'; Williamson (yellow card) 67'; McGraw 73'	Stadium: Q2 Stadium; Attendance: 20,738; Referee: Chris Penso

September 4 30	Portland Timbers	2–1	Atlanta United FC	Portland, Oregon
2:30 PM PDT	Moreno 38' (pen.); Asprilla (yellow card) 78', (goal) 82' (pen.)	Report	Martínez 88'	Stadium: Providence Park; Attendance: 24,438; Referee: Jon Freemon

September 10 31	Portland Timbers	1–0	Minnesota United FC	Portland, Oregon
7:00 PM CDT	Bravo (yellow card) 43'; Asprilla 61'; McGraw (yellow card) 85'	Report	Lawrence (yellow card) 88'	Stadium: Providence Park; Attendance: 25,019; Referee: Guido Gonzales Jr.

September 18 32	Columbus Crew	1–1	Portland Timbers	Columbus, OH
4:30 PDT	Morris (yellow card) 10'; Molino 36'; Hernández (yellow card) 90+3'	Report	Chara (yellow card) 25'; Tuiloma (yellow card) 45'; Mabiala (yellow card) 66'; Moreno (yellow card) 71'; Moreno 90+5'	Stadium: Lower.com Field; Attendance: 20,421; Referee: Victor Rivas

October 2 33	Portland Timbers	1–2	Los Angeles FC	Portland, Oregon
12:00 PM PDT	Paredes (yellow card) 48'; Župarić (yellow card) 63'; Asprilla 81'	Report	Vela 51'; Segura (yellow card) 57'; Murillo (yellow card) 90+1'; Bouanga 90+5'	Stadium: Providence Park; Attendance: 25,218; Referee: Ismail Elfath

October 9 34	Real Salt Lake	3–1	Portland Timbers	Sandy, Utah
2:00 PM PDT	Savarino 19'; Rubin 48', (yellow card) 67'; Hidalgo 82'	Report	Ayala (yellow card) 27'; Asprilla 87'; Blanco (yellow card) 88'	Stadium: America First Field; Attendance: 21,333; Referee: Armando Villarreal

=== U.S. Open Cup ===
Win Draw Loss Upcoming fixture

=== Top scorers ===
The list is sorted by shirt number when total goals are equal.

Rnk	Pos	No.	Player	MLS	MLS Cup Playoffs	Champions League	Total
