= 2022 Colorado Rapids season =

Colorado Rapids
2022 season
- Owner: Stan Kroenke
- Head coach: Robin Fraser
- Major League Soccer: Conference: 10th Overall: 18th
- CONCACAF Champions League: Round of 16
- U.S. Open Cup: Round of 32
- Top goalscorer: League: Diego Rubio (16); All: Diego Rubio (16)
- Highest home attendance: 18,084 (July 4th v. ATX)
- Lowest home attendance: 11,938 (September 14th v. SJ)
- Average home league attendance: 14,473
- Biggest win: COL 3–0 ATL (March 5th)
- Biggest defeat: PHI 6–0 COL (August 27th)
Home colors	Away colors

The 2022 Colorado Rapids season was the club's twenty-seventh season of existence and their twenty-seventh consecutive season in Major League Soccer (MLS), the top flight of American soccer.

== Background ==
Colorado finished the 2021 season 1st in the Western Conference table, and 2nd overall in MLS. They reached the semifinals of the MLS Cup Playoffs, losing to the Portland Timbers 1–0.

== Roster ==
As of July 21, 2022

Note: Flags indicate national team as defined under FIFA eligibility rules; some limited exceptions apply. Players may hold more than one non-FIFA nationality.

No.	Pos.	Nation	Player
1	GK	USA	Clint Irwin
2	DF	USA	Keegan Rosenberry
3	DF	USA	Drew Moor
4	DF	SCO	Danny Wilson
6	DF	GHA	Lalas Abubakar
7	FW	USA	Jonathan Lewis
8	MF	BRA	Max Alves
11	FW	CHI	Diego Rubio
12	FW	COL	Michael Barrios
13	MF	CHI	Felipe Gutiérrez (on loan from Universidad Católica)
15	FW	SCO	Sam Nicholson
16	MF	KEN	Philip Mayaka (GA)
18	FW	USA	Oliver Larraz (HGP)
19	MF	ENG	Jack Price (captain)
21	MF	HON	Bryan Acosta

No.	Pos.	Nation	Player
22	GK	USA	William Yarbrough
24	DF	ECU	Gustavo Vallecilla
27	DF	USA	Sebastian Anderson (HGP)
28	GK	USA	Abraham Rodriguez (HGP)
29	FW	USA	Gyasi Zardes (DP)
30	DF	USA	Aboubacar Keita
31	DF	USA	Anthony Markanich
32	MF	USA	Collen Warner
33	DF	IRI	Steven Beitashour
37	FW	USA	Dantouma Toure
52	MF	ARG	Braian Galván
66	DF	BRA	Lucas Esteves (on loan from Palmeiras)
77	FW	USA	Darren Yapi (HGP)
97	MF	CAN	Ralph Priso-Mbongue

=== Out on loan ===
As of March 5, 2021

Note: Flags indicate national team as defined under FIFA eligibility rules; some limited exceptions apply. Players may hold more than one non-FIFA nationality.

No.	Pos.	Nation	Player
26	MF	USA	Cole Bassett (HGP)

== Competitions ==
Win Draw Loss Upcoming fixture

=== Preseason ===
January 29, 2022 Desert Showcase 1	Sporting Kansas City	0–0	Colorado Rapids	Tucson, Arizona
8:00pm MST		Report		Stadium: Kino Sports Complex

February 1, 2022 Closed-door	Seattle Sounders FC	1–1	Colorado Rapids	Tucson, Arizona
MST	Ruidíaz 70'	COL Report; SEA Report	Esteves 40' (Rubio)	Stadium: Kino Sports Complex
Note: 75-minute scrimmage.

February 1, 2022 Closed-door	Seattle Sounders FC	0–2	Colorado Rapids	Tucson, Arizona
MST		COL Report; SEA Report	Yapi 7' (Beitashour), 21' (pen.)	Stadium: Kino Sports Complex
Note: 75-minute scrimmage.

February 5, 2022 Desert Showcase 2	Houston Dynamo FC	3–2	Colorado Rapids	Tucson, Arizona
MST	Ferreira 33'; Gitau; Carrasquilla 90'	Report	Rubio 6' (Esteves); Toure 85'	Stadium: Kino Sports Complex

February 11, 2022 Closed-door	Orlando City SC	1–1	Colorado Rapids	Orlando, Florida
MST	Jansson 3'	Report	Rubio 45'	Stadium: Exploria Stadium

=== Major League Soccer ===
==== Standings ====
===== Western Conference =====
Pos	Team	Pld	W	L	T	GF	GA	GD	Pts	Qualification
8	Portland Timbers	34	11	10	13	53	53	0	46	
9	Vancouver Whitecaps FC (Note: Canadian clubs could not qualify for the 2023 CONCACAF Champions League through the MLS regular season or playoffs.)	34	12	15	7	40	57	−17	43	Qualification for the CONCACAF Champions League (Note: as 2022 Canadian Championship winners.)
10	Colorado Rapids	34	11	13	10	46	57	−11	43	
11	Seattle Sounders FC	34	12	17	5	47	46	+1	41	
12	Sporting Kansas City	34	11	16	7	42	54	−12	40	

Source: MLS
Rules for classification: 1) points; 2) total wins; 3) total goal differential; 4) total goals scored; 5) fewer disciplinary points; 6) away goal differential; 7) away goals scored; 8) home goals differential; 9) home goals scored; 10) coin toss (2 clubs tied) or drawing of lots (≥3 clubs tied)

===== Overall table =====
Pos	Team	Pld	W	L	T	GF	GA	GD	Pts	
16	Columbus Crew	34	10	8	16	46	41	+5	46	
17	Vancouver Whitecaps FC (Note: Canadian clubs could not qualify for the 2023 CONCACAF Champions League through the MLS regular season or playoffs.) (V)	34	12	15	7	40	57	−17	43	Qualification for the CONCACAF Champions League (Note: As 2022 Canadian Championship winners (CAN1))
18	Colorado Rapids	34	11	13	10	46	57	−11	43	
19	Charlotte FC	34	13	18	3	44	52	−8	42	
20	New England Revolution	34	10	12	12	47	50	−3	42	

Source: MLS
Rules for classification: 1) points; 2) total wins; 3) total goal differential; 4) total goals scored; 5) fewer disciplinary points; 6) away goal differential; 7) away goals scored; 8) home goals differential; 9) home goals scored; 10) coin toss (2 clubs tied) or drawing of lots (≥3 clubs tied)
(V) Canadian Championship winners

==== Results summary ====
Overall								Home						Away					
Pld	Pts	W	L	T	GF	GA	GD	W	L	T	GF	GA	GD	W	L	T	GF	GA	GD
34	43	11	13	10	46	57	−11	10	2	5	29	15	+14	1	11	5	17	42	−25

Source: MLS standings
Pld = Matches played; Pts = Points; W = Matches won; T = Matches tied; L = Matches lost; GF = Goals for; GA = Goals against; GD = Goal difference

==== Match results ====
February 26, 2022 1	Los Angeles FC	3–0	Colorado Rapids	Los Angeles, California
1:30 PM MST	Vela 29' (pen.), 35', 50'; Fall (yellow card) 58'; Crépeau (yellow card) 58'; Cifuentes (yellow card) 81'; Arango (yellow card) 90'	Report	Lewis (yellow card) 5'	Stadium: Banc of California Stadium; Attendance: 22,010; Referee: Armando Villarreal

March 5, 2022 2	Colorado Rapids	3–0	Atlanta United FC	Commerce City, Colorado
4:00 PM MST	Trusty (yellow card) 21'; Rubio 33'; Price (yellow card) 42'; Lewis 48'; Kaye (yellow card) 51'; Shinyashiki (yellow card) 80', (goal) 87'	Report	Hernández (yellow card) 20'; Robinson (yellow card) 31' (yellow-red card) 86'; Dwyer (yellow card) 89'	Stadium: Dick's Sporting Goods Park; Attendance: 12,538; Referee: Joseph Dickerson

March 12, 2022 3	Colorado Rapids	2–0	Sporting Kansas City	Commerce City, Colorado
7:00 PM MST	Rubio 21'; Kaye 51'; Rosenberry (yellow card) 62'	Report	Isimat-Mirin (yellow card) 29'; Duke (yellow card) 56'	Stadium: Dick's Sporting Goods Park; Attendance: 12,387; Referee: Alex Chilowicz

March 19, 2022 4	Houston Dynamo FC	1–1	Colorado Rapids	Houston, Texas
6:30 PM MDT	Dorsey (yellow card) 68'; Rodríguez (yellow card) 78'; Pasher 90'	Report	Trusty (yellow card) 37'; Kaye 42'; Rosenberry (yellow card) 45+1'; Rubio (yellow card) 62'; Wilson (yellow card) 90+3'	Stadium: PNC Stadium; Attendance: 17,007; Referee: Nima Saghafi

April 2, 2022 5	Colorado Rapids	1–1	Real Salt Lake	Commerce City, Colorado
7:00 PM MDT	Wilson (yellow card) 26'; Abubakar 56'	Report	Ruíz 45' (pen.), (yellow card) 50'; Silva (yellow card) 74'; Schmitt (yellow card) 90'	Stadium: Dick's Sporting Goods Park; Attendance: 13,380; Referee: Ted Unkel

April 9, 2022 6	FC Dallas	3–1	Colorado Rapids	Frisco, Texas
6:30 PM MDT	Martínez (yellow card) 16'; Cerrillo (yellow card) 24'; Servania 45+2', (yellow card) 77'; Ferreira 51', 89'	Report	Kaye (yellow card) 2'; Rubio 30'; Max (yellow card) 40'; Barrios (yellow card) 45+1'	Stadium: Toyota Stadium; Attendance: 15,893; Referee: Lukasz Szpala

April 16, 2022 7	Minnesota United FC	3–1	Colorado Rapids	Saint Paul, Minnesota
6:00 PM MDT	Dibassy 42'; Arriaga (yellow card) 56'; Lod (yellow card) 69', (goal) 77'; Danladi 79'	Report	Esteves (yellow card) 27'; Rubio (yellow card) 30', (goal) 45'; Yarbrough (yellow card) 32'; Price (yellow card) 36'	Stadium: Allianz Field; Referee: Chris Penso

April 23, 2022 8	Colorado Rapids	0–0	Charlotte FC	Commerce City, Colorado
7:00 PM MDT	Lewis (yellow card) 66'	Report	Alcívar (yellow card) 44'; Corujo (yellow card) 53'; Ortiz (yellow card) 63'	Stadium: Dick's Sporting Goods Park; Attendance: 13,160; Referee: Ismir Pekmic

April 30, 2022 9	Colorado Rapids	2–0	Portland Timbers	Commerce City, Colorado
7:00 PM MDT	Max (yellow card) 17'; Rubio 30', (yellow card) 45+3' (yellow-red card) 63'; Abubakar (yellow card) 38'; Beitashour (yellow card) 46'; Trusty (yellow card) 66'; Yarbrough (yellow card) 90+3'; Kaye 90+5'	Report	Williamson (yellow card) 29'; Mabiala (yellow card) 29'; Ivačič (yellow card) 66'; Van Rankin (yellow card) 73'	Stadium: Dick's Sporting Goods Park; Attendance: 14,038; Referee: Armando Villareal

May 7, 2022 10	San Jose Earthquakes	1–0	Colorado Rapids	San Jose, California
8:00 PM MDT	Nathan 64'; Calvo (yellow card) 73'	Report		Stadium: PayPal Park; Attendance: 14,077; Referee: Tori Penso

May 14, 2022 11	Colorado Rapids	2–0	Los Angeles FC	Commerce City, Colorado
1:30 PM MDT	Zardes 17' (pen.); Rubio 28' (pen.); Acosta (yellow card) 29'; Abubakar (yellow card) 88'	Report	Ibeagha (yellow card) 16'; Cifuentes (yellow card) 22'; Arango (yellow card) 24'	Stadium: Dick's Sporting Goods Park; Attendance: 15,022; Referee: Ted Unkel

May 18, 2022 12	Sporting Kansas City	2–1	Colorado Rapids	Kansas City, Kansas
6:30 PM MDT	Sallói 24', 50', (red card) 90+9'; Hernández (yellow card) 58'; Ndenbe (yellow card) 79'; Fontàs (red card) 90+6'	Report	Acosta (yellow card) 3'; Esteves 29', (yellow card) 90+3' (yellow-red card) 90+6'; Trusty (yellow card) 78' (yellow-red card) 90+1'; Abubakar (yellow card) 90'; Rubio (yellow card) 90+1'	Stadium: Children's Mercy Park; Attendance: 17,233; Referee: Drew Fischer

May 22, 2022 13	Colorado Rapids	1–0	Seattle Sounders FC	Commerce City, Colorado
6:00 PM MDT	Lewis 50'; Rosenberry (yellow card) 53'; Acosta (yellow card) 71'	Report	Vargas (yellow card) 45+1'; Yeimar (yellow card) 46'	Stadium: Dick's Sporting Goods Park; Attendance: 14,923; Referee: Timothy Ford

May 28, 2022 14	Colorado Rapids	1–3	Nashville SC	Commerce City, Colorado
7:00 PM MDT	Rubio (yellow card) 14', (goal) 78'; Abubakar (yellow card) 41'; Acosta (yellow card) 51'	Report	Sapong 8'; Mukhtar 14', 17', (yellow card) 56'; Miller (yellow card) 42'	Stadium: Dick's Sporting Goods Park; Attendance: 15,465; Referee: Nima Saghafi

June 19, 2022 15	New York City FC	1–1	Colorado Rapids	New York, New York
3:00 PM MDT	Castellanos (yellow card) 68'; Magno 72'; Morales (yellow card) 83'	Report	Price (yellow card) 30'; Abubakar (yellow card) 56'; Barrios 68'; Acosta (yellow card) 73'; Wilson (yellow card) 76'	Stadium: Yankee Stadium; Attendance: 19,812; Referee: Marcos de Oliveira

June 25, 2022 16	Portland Timbers	3–0	Colorado Rapids	Portland, Oregon
8:30 PM MDT	Chará (yellow card) 27'; Blanco 45+8' (pen.); Niezgoda 54', 62'	Report	Yarbrough (yellow card) 45+6'; Esteves (yellow card) 84'; Toure (yellow card) 90'	Stadium: Providence Park; Attendance: 23,448; Referee: Rosendo Mendoza

July 4, 2022 17	Colorado Rapids	2–3	Austin FC	Commerce City, Colorado
7:00 PM MDT	Abubakar 19'; Lewis 22'	Report	Pereira (yellow card) 18'; Finlay 28'; Keller (yellow card) 41' (yellow-red card) 75'; Driussi 45+1'; Urruti 59'	Stadium: Dick's Sporting Goods Park; Attendance: 18,084; Referee: Joseph Dickerson

July 9, 2022 18	Real Salt Lake	2–2	Colorado Rapids	Sandy, Utah
8:00 PM MDT	MacMath (yellow card) 38'; Ruiz (yellow card) 47'; Savarino 45+3'; Meram 51', (yellow card) 86'; Besler (yellow card) 90+1'	Report	Wilson (yellow card) 33'; Acosta (yellow card) 50'; Rubio 67' (pen.); Max (yellow card) 79'; Abubakar 89'	Stadium: Rio Tinto Stadium; Attendance: 20,242; Referee: Lukasz Szpala

July 13, 2022 19	Colorado Rapids	1–1	Orlando City SC	Commerce City, Colorado
7:00 PM MDT	Esteves (yellow card) 40'; Zardes 65'; Abubakar (yellow card) 69'; Lewis (yellow card) 77'; Wilson (yellow card) 82'; Rosenberry (yellow card) 86'	Report	Torres 22'; Pereyra (yellow card) 66'; Urso (yellow card) 77'; Halliday (yellow card) 83'	Stadium: Dick's Sporting Goods Park; Attendance: 12,538; Referee: Fotis Bazakos

July 16, 2022 20	Colorado Rapids	2–0	LA Galaxy	Commerce City, Colorado
7:00 PM MDT	Rubio 20'; Wilson (yellow card) 68'; Zardes 75'; Warner (yellow card) 90+2'	Report	Raveloson (yellow card) 39'; Araujo (yellow card) 62'; DePuy (yellow card) 68'; Gasper (yellow card) 78'	Stadium: Dick's Sporting Goods Park; Attendance: 17,975; Referee: Guido Gonzales Jr.

July 23, 2022 21	Seattle Sounders FC	2–1	Colorado Rapids	Seattle, Washington
8:00 PM MDT	Rowe (yellow card) 22' (yellow-red card) 47'; Morris 43'; Lodeiro 71' (pen.)	Report	Lewis 3', (yellow card) 87'; Acosta (yellow card) 32'; Vallecilla (yellow card) 43'; Barrios (yellow card) 56'; Yapi (yellow card) 90+1'	Stadium: Lumen Field; Attendance: 32,476; Referee: Rosendo Mendoza

August 2, 2022 22	New York Red Bulls	4–5	Colorado Rapids	Harrison, New Jersey
5:30 PM MDT	Yearwood 6'; Long 9'; Morgan 28' (pen.); Barlow 90+7' (pen.)	Report	Rubio 21', (yellow card) 45+2'; Abubakar (yellow card) 27'; Rosenberry 38'; Vallecilla (yellow card) 64'; Warner 77'; Barrios 80', (yellow card) 90+7'; Toure 89'	Stadium: Red Bull Arena; Attendance: 13,812; Referee: Drew Fischer
Note: This match was originally scheduled for July 30 which was rescheduled due to the New York Red Bulls hosting a friendly match with FC Barcelona on that day.

August 6, 2022 23	Colorado Rapids	4–3	Minnesota United FC	Commerce City, Colorado
7:00 PM MDT	Zardes 7', 15', 61'; Rubio 11'; Acosta (yellow card) 82'; Max (yellow card) 83'	Report	Danladi 4'; Amarilla 43'; Rosales (yellow card) 67'; Kallman 81'; Lawrence (yellow card) 87'; Fragapane (yellow card) 90+1'	Stadium: Dick's Sporting Goods Park; Attendance: 14,738; Referee: Ismir Pekmic

August 13, 2022 24	Colorado Rapids	1–1	Columbus Crew	Commerce City, Colorado
7:00 PM MDT	Esteves (yellow card) 28'; Wilson (yellow card) 38'; Rubio 41' (pen.), (yellow card) 78'; Acosta (yellow card) 42'	Report	Hernández 5'; Nagbe (yellow card) 35'; Artur (yellow card) 40'; Zelarayán (yellow card) 63'	Stadium: Dick's Sporting Goods Park; Attendance: 13,254; Referee: Jon Freemon

August 17, 2022 25	Vancouver Whitecaps FC	2–1	Colorado Rapids	Vancouver, British Columbia
8:00 PM MDT	Gauld 14', 40'	Report	Zardes 76'; Priso-Mbongue (yellow card) 90+7'	Stadium: BC Place; Attendance: 14,682; Referee: Filip Dujic

August 20, 2022 26	Colorado Rapids	1–1	Houston Dynamo FC	Commerce City, Colorado
7:00 PM MDT	Acosta (yellow card) 19' (yellow-red card) 80'; Abubakar 48'; Gutiérrez (yellow card) 65'; Barrios (yellow card) 85'	Report	Dorsey (yellow card) 15'; Herrera (yellow card) 67'; Ferreira 90+5'	Stadium: Dick's Sporting Goods Park; Attendance: 15,380; Referee: Marcos de Oliveira

August 27, 2022 27	Philadelphia Union	6–0	Colorado Rapids	Chester, Pennsylvania
5:30 PM MDT	Gazdag 9', 20' (pen.), 83'; Carranza 30' (pen.); Burke 87'; Real 90+1'	Report	Vallecilla (yellow card) 7' (yellow-red card) 35'; Priso-Mbongue (yellow card) 11'; Warner (yellow card) 27'	Stadium: Subaru Park; Attendance: 18,005; Referee: Allen Chapman

August 31, 2022 28	Nashville SC	4–1	Colorado Rapids	Nashville, Tennessee
6:30 PM MDT	Mukhtar 29' (pen.), 54', 75'; Godoy (yellow card) 45'; Leal (yellow card) 59'; Shaffelburg 61'; McCarty (yellow card) 70'	Report	Zardes 35'; Abubakar (yellow card) 41'; Acosta (yellow card) 71'	Stadium: Nissan Stadium; Attendance: 24,127; Referee: Mark Allatin

September 4, 2022 29	D.C. United	0–0	Colorado Rapids	Washington, D.C.
5:30 PM MDT	Birnbaum (yellow card) 57'; Benteke (penalty missed) 66'	Report	Zardes (yellow card) 74'; Rubio (yellow card) 84'; Beitashour (yellow card) 90+5'	Stadium: Audi Field; Attendance: 16,502; Referee: Tori Penso

September 10, 2022 30	Colorado Rapids	3–1	Vancouver Whitecaps FC	Commerce City, Colorado
7:30 PM MDT	Zardes 21'; Rubio 33' (pen.); Lewis 75'	Report	White 8'; Veselinović (yellow card) 32'; Schöpf (yellow card) 52'	Stadium: Dick's Sporting Goods Park; Attendance: 14,036; Referee: Kevin Stott

September 14, 2022 31	Colorado Rapids	2–1	San Jose Earthquakes	Commerce City, Colorado
8:00 PM MDT	Rubio 21'; Rosenberry 77'; Warner (yellow card) 90+4'	Report	Nathan 37'; Remedi (yellow card) 48'; Judson (yellow card) 90'	Stadium: Dick's Sporting Goods Park; Attendance: 11,938; Referee: Pierre-Luc Lauziere

September 17, 2022 32	LA Galaxy	4–1	Colorado Rapids	Carson, California
8:30 PM MDT	Brugman 22', 52'; Edwards 28'; Hernández 31'; Costa (red card) 62'; Grandsir (yellow card) 64'	Report	Gutiérrez (yellow card) 26'; Abubakar (yellow card) 34'; Beitashour (yellow card) 60'; Barrios (yellow card) 63'; Max (yellow card) 65'; Nicholson 90+1'	Stadium: Dignity Health Sports Park; Attendance: 20,325; Referee: Joseph Dickerson

October 1, 2022 33	Colorado Rapids	1–0	FC Dallas	Commerce City, Colorado
1:30 PM MDT	Rubio 66'; Vallecilla (red card) 77'; Yapi (yellow card) 90+2'; Yarbrough (yellow card) 90+4'	Report	Pomykal (yellow card) 39'	Stadium: Dick's Sporting Goods Park; Attendance: 17,193; Referee: Chris Penso

October 9, 2022 34	Austin FC	1–1	Colorado Rapids	Austin, Texas
3:00 PM MDT	Driussi 81' (pen.)	Report	Gutiérrez (yellow card) 66'; Rubio (yellow card) 80', (goal) 90+3'	Stadium: Q2 Stadium; Attendance: 20,738; Referee: Pierre-Luc Lauziere

=== CONCACAF Champions League ===
==== Round of 16 ====
February 17, 2022 Leg 1	Comunicaciones (Guatemala)	1–0 (1–0 agg.)	(United States) Colorado Rapids	Guatemala City
5:00 PM MST	Robles (yellow card) 57'; Espino 89'; Gamboa (yellow card) 90+2'	Report		Stadium: Estadio Doroteo Guamuch Flores; Referee: Selvin Brown

February 23, 2022 Leg 2	Colorado Rapids (United States)	1–0 (1–1 agg.) (3–4 p)	(Guatemala) Comunicaciones	Commerce City, Colorado
6:15 PM MST	Kaye (yellow card) 13'; Alves 29'	Report	Corena (yellow card) 7'; Robles (red card) 16'; Contreras (yellow card) 36'; Gamboa (yellow card) 73'	Stadium: Dick's Sporting Goods Park; Referee: Walter López
	Penalties
	Rubio (penalty scored); Acosta (penalty scored); Price (penalty missed); Mezquida (penalty scored); Lewis (penalty missed); Rosenberry (penalty missed); Shinyashiki (penalty missed)		(penalty scored) Contreras; (penalty scored) Aparicio; (penalty scored) Larín; (penalty missed) Santis; (penalty missed) Corena; (penalty missed) López; (penalty scored) Samayoa

=== U.S. Open Cup ===
Due to their entry in the CONCACAF Champions League, the Rapids entered the U.S. Open Cup in the Round of 32. The draw for the Round of 32 took place on April 21, and the Rapids drew Minnesota United FC.

May 11, 2022 Round of 32	Minnesota United FC (MLS)	2–1	Colorado Rapids (MLS)	Saint Paul, Minnesota
7:00 pm CDT	Danladi 8'; Kallman (yellow card) 55' (yellow-red card) 83'; Reynoso 87'		Mezquida 15'; Max (yellow card) 63'	Stadium: Allianz Field; Referee: Brandon Stevis

== Statistics ==
=== Appearances and goals ===
Numbers after plus–sign (+) denote appearances as a substitute.

No.	Pos	Nat	Player	Total		MLS		USOC		CCL	
No.	Pos	Nat	Player	Apps	Goals	Apps	Goals	Apps	Goals	Apps	Goals
1	GK	(United States) USA	Clint Irwin	1	0	0	0	1	0	0	0
2	DF	(United States) USA	Keegan Rosenberry	37	2	33+1	2	1	0	2	0
3	DF	(United States) USA	Drew Moor	9	0	1+8	0	0	0	0	0
4	DF	(Scotland) SCO	Danny Wilson	29	0	25+1	0	0+1	0	2	0
5	DF	(United States) USA	Auston Trusty	19	0	17	0	0	0	2	0
6	DF	(Ghana) GHA	Lalas Abubakar	33	4	28+3	4	0	0	2	0
7	FW	(United States) USA	Jonathan Lewis	36	5	25+8	5	0+1	0	1+1	0
8	MF	(Brazil) BRA	Max Alves	31	1	9+19	0	1	0	1+1	1
9	FW	(Brazil) BRA	Andre Shinyashiki	9	1	2+6	1	0	0	0+1	0
11	FW	(Chile) CHI	Diego Rubio	33	16	28+2	16	1	0	2	0
12	FW	(Colombia) COL	Michael Barrios	37	2	19+15	2	1	0	1+1	0
13	MF	(Chile) CHI	Felipe Gutiérrez	12	0	10+2	0	0	0	0	0
14	MF	(Canada) CAN	Mark-Anthony Kaye	20	3	15+2	3	0+1	0	2	0
15	FW	(Scotland) SCO	Sam Nicholson	15	1	10+5	1	0	0	0	0
19	MF	(England) ENG	Jack Price	19	0	14+3	0	0	0	2	0
20	MF	(Uruguay) URU	Nicolás Mezquida	11	1	0+9	0	1	1	0+1	0
21	MF	(Honduras) HON	Bryan Acosta	29	0	22+4	0	1	0	0+2	0
22	GK	(United States) USA	William Yarbrough	36	0	34	0	0	0	2	0
24	DF	(Ecuador) ECU	Gustavo Vallecilla	13	0	7+5	0	1	0	0	0
27	DF	(United States) USA	Sebastian Anderson	3	0	0+2	0	0+1	0	0	0
28	GK	(United States) USA	Abraham Rodriguez	1	0	0+1	0	0	0	0	0
29	FW	(United States) USA	Gyasi Zardes	26	9	24+2	9	0	0	0	0
31	DF	(United States) USA	Anthony Markanich	4	0	3	0	1	0	0	0
32	MF	(United States) USA	Collen Warner	20	1	6+12	1	0+1	0	1	0
33	DF	(Iran) IRI	Steven Beitashour	20	0	14+5	0	1	0	0	0
37	FW	(United States) USA	Dantouma Toure	5	1	0+5	1	0	0	0	0
66	DF	(Brazil) BRA	Lucas Esteves	32	1	24+6	1	0	0	2	0
77	FW	(United States) USA	Darren Yapi	11	0	1+10	0	0	0	0	0
97	MF	(Canada) CAN	Ralph Priso-Mbongue	6	0	3+3	0	0	0	0	0

- Last updated: October 9, 2022
- Source: Colorado stats

=== Top scorers ===
Rank	Position	Number	Name	MLS	US Open Cup	CONCACAF Champion's League	Total
1	FW	11	(Chile) Diego Rubio	16	0	0	16
2	FW	29	(United States) Gyasi Zardes	9	0	0	9
3	FW	7	(United States) Jonathan Lewis	4	0	0	4
4	DF	6	(Ghana) Lalas Abubakar	4	0	0	4
5	MF	14	(Canada) Mark-Anthony Kaye	3	0	0	3
6	DF	2	(United States) Keegan Rosenberry	2	0	0	2
6	FW	12	(Colombia) Michael Barrios	2	0	0	2
8	MF	8	(Brazil) Max	0	0	1	1
8	FW	9	(Brazil) Andre Shinyashiki	1	0	0	1
8	FW	15	(Scotland) Sam Nicholson	1	0	0	1
8	MF	20	(Uruguay) Nicolás Mezquida	0	1	0	1
8	MF	32	(United States) Collen Warner	1	0	0	1
8	FW	37	(United States) Dantouma Toure	1	0	0	1
8	DF	66	(Brazil) Lucas Esteves	1	0	0	1
Total				46	1	1	48

- Last updated: October 9, 2022
- Source: Team Goals

=== Top assists ===
Rank	Position	Number	Name	MLS	US Open Cup	CONCACAF Champion's League	Total
1	FW	12	(Colombia) Michael Barrios	7	0	0	7
2	FW	11	(Chile) Diego Rubio	6	0	0	6
3	DF	2	(United States) Keegan Rosenberry	2	0	1	3
3	MF	19	(England) Jack Price	3	0	0	3
3	MF	21	(Honduras) Bryan Acosta	3	0	0	3
3	DF	66	(Brazil) Lucas Esteves	3	0	0	3
7	DF	4	(Scotland) Danny Wilson	2	0	0	2
7	FW	7	(United States) Jonathan Lewis	2	0	0	2
7	MF	13	(Chile) Felipe Gutiérrez	2	0	0	2
7	FW	29	(United States) Gyasi Zardes	2	0	0	2
7	DF	33	(Iran) Steven Beitashour	2	0	0	2
12	DF	6	(Ghana) Lalas Abubakar	1	0	0	1
12	MF	8	(Brazil) Max	1	0	0	1
12	MF	14	(Canada) Mark-Anthony Kaye	1	0	0	1
Total				37	0	1	38

- Last updated: October 9, 2022
- Source: Team Assists

=== Clean sheets ===
Rank	Position	Number	Name	MLS	US Open Cup	CONCACAF Champion's League	Total
1	GK	22	(United States) William Yarbrough	9	0	1	10
Total				9	0	1	10

- Last updated: October 9, 2021
- Source: Clean Sheets

=== Disciplinary record ===
Rank	No.	Pos.	Player	MLS			US Open Cup			CONCACAF Champion's League			Total		
Rank	No.	Pos.	Player	Yellow card	(yellow card) (yellow-red card)	Red card	Yellow card	(yellow card) (yellow-red card)	Red card	Yellow card	(yellow card) (yellow-red card)	Red card	Yellow card	(yellow card) (yellow-red card)	Red card
1	21	MF	(Honduras) Bryan Acosta	10	1	0	0	0	0	0	0	0	10	1	0
2	11	FW	(Chile) Diego Rubio	9	1	0	0	0	0	0	0	0	9	1	0
3	6	DF	(Ghana) Lalas Abubakar	9	0	0	0	0	0	0	0	0	9	0	0
4	4	DF	(Scotland) Danny Wilson	7	0	0	0	0	0	0	0	0	7	0	0
5	66	DF	(Brazil) Lucas Esteves	5	0	1	0	0	0	0	0	0	5	0	1
5	8	MF	(Brazil) Max	5	0	0	1	0	0	0	0	0	6	0	0
7	24	DF	(Ecuador) Gustavo Vallecilla	3	1	1	0	0	0	0	0	0	3	1	1
7	5	DF	(United States) Auston Trusty	4	1	0	0	0	0	0	0	0	4	1	0
7	12	FW	(Colombia) Michael Barrios	5	0	0	0	0	0	0	0	0	5	0	0
10	2	DF	(United States) Keegan Rosenberry	4	0	0	0	0	0	0	0	0	4	0	0
10	7	MF	(United States) Jonathan Lewis	4	0	0	0	0	0	0	0	0	4	0	0
10	22	GK	(United States) William Yarbrough	4	0	0	0	0	0	0	0	0	4	0	0
13	13	MF	(Chile) Felipe Gutiérrez	3	0	0	0	0	0	0	0	0	3	0	0
13	14	MF	(Canada) Mark-Anthony Kaye	2	0	0	0	0	0	1	0	0	3	0	0
13	19	MF	(England) Jack Price	3	0	0	0	0	0	0	0	0	3	0	0
13	32	MF	(United States) Collen Warner	3	0	0	0	0	0	0	0	0	3	0	0
13	33	DF	(Iran) Steven Beitashour	3	0	0	0	0	0	0	0	0	3	0	0
18	77	FW	(United States) Darren Yapi	2	0	0	0	0	0	0	0	0	2	0	0
18	97	MF	(Canada) Ralph Priso-Mbongue	2	0	0	0	0	0	0	0	0	2	0	0
20	9	FW	(Brazil) Andre Shinyashiki	1	0	0	0	0	0	0	0	0	1	0	0
20	29	FW	(United States) Gyasi Zardes	1	0	0	0	0	0	0	0	0	1	0	0
20	37	FW	(United States) Dantouma Toure	1	0	0	0	0	0	0	0	0	1	0	0
Total				90	4	2	1	0	0	1	0	0	90	4	2

- Last updated: October 9, 2021
- Source: Team Discipline

== Transfers ==
For transfers in, dates listed are when the Rapids officially signed the players to the roster. For transfers out, dates are listed when the Rapids officially removed the players from the roster, not when they signed with another club. If a player later signed with a different club, his new club will be noted, but the date listed remains when he was officially removed from the roster.

=== In ===
Pos.	Player	Transferred from	Fee/notes	Date	Source
DF	(United States) Aboubacar Keita	(United States) Columbus Crew	Columbus receives $300,000 in GAM.	January 4, 2022	
MF	(Brazil) Max Alves	(Brazil) Flamengo	Transfer fee not disclosed	January 5, 2022	
MF	(Honduras) Bryan Acosta	(United States) FC Dallas	Rights acquired in stage two of the 2021 MLS Re-Entry Draft	January 19, 2022	
DF	(United States) Jackson Travis	(United States) Rapids Academy	Homegrown contract	March 4, 2022	
DF	(Ecuador) Gustavo Vallecilla	(United States) FC Cincinnati	FC Cincinnati receives $400,000 in 2022 GAM, and $400,000 in 2023 GAM	March 28, 2022	
FW	(United States) Gyasi Zardes	(United States) Columbus Crew	Columbus Crew receives $300,000 in GAM. Deal could escalate up to $1.4 million GAM.	April 22, 2022	
FW	(Scotland) Sam Nicholson	(England) Bristol Rovers F.C.	Free transfer.	June 17, 2022	
MF	(Canada) Ralph Priso	(Canada) Toronto FC	Toronto receives Mark-Anthony Kaye, Colorado receives Priso, $775,000 in GAM, and a 2023 SuperDraft pick. Deal could escalate up to $1.05 million GAM.	July 8, 2022	

==== Loans in ====
Pos.	Player	Parent club	Length/Notes	Beginning	End	Source
DF	(United States) Auston Trusty	(England) Arsenal FC	6–month loan	January 31, 2022	July 5, 2022	
DF	(Brazil) Lucas Esteves	(Brazil) Palmeiras	Loan extended through the end of the 2022 MLS season	July 1, 2022	TBD	
MF	(Chile) Felipe Gutiérrez	(Chile) Universidad Católica	Loan through the end of the 2022 MLS season	August 3, 2022	TBD	

==== SuperDraft ====
Draft picks are not automatically signed to the team roster. Only those who are signed to a contract will be listed as transfers in. Only trades involving draft picks and executed after the start of the 2022 MLS SuperDraft will be listed in the notes.

Date	Player	Position	Previous club	Notes	Ref
January 11, 2022	(Canada) Mohamed Omar	MF	Notre Dame	Round 1, Pick 23	
January 11, 2022	(United States) Anthony Markanich	DF	Northern Illinois	Round 1, Pick 26	
January 11, 2022	(El Salvador) Roberto Molina	MF	UC Irvine	Round 2, Pick 45	

=== Out ===
Pos.	Player	Transferred to	Fee/notes	Date	Source
DF	(United States) Kortne Ford	(United States) Sporting Kansas City	Option Declined	December 3, 2021	
DF	(United States) Jeremy Kelly	(United States) Memphis 901 FC	Option Declined	December 3, 2021	
MF	(Denmark) Younes Namli	(Netherlands) Sparta Rotterdam	Option Declined	December 3, 2021	
GK	(United States) Andre Rawls	TBD	Option Declined	December 3, 2021	
MF	(United States) Will Vint	(United States) Charlotte Independence	Option Declined	December 3, 2021	
FW	(Senegal) Dominique Badji	(United States) FC Cincinnati	Free Transfer	January 4, 2022	
MF	(United States) Kellyn Acosta	(United States) Los Angeles FC	Colorado receives $1.1 million (with the potential for $400,000 more in incentives) in GAM.	January 14, 2022	
DF	(United States) Auston Trusty	(England) Arsenal FC	Transfer fee not disclosed. Trusty loaned back to Rapids for 6 months.	January 31, 2022	
FW	(Brazil) Andre Shinyashiki	(United States) Charlotte FC	Colorado receives $225,000 (with the potential for $175,000 more in incentives) in GAM.	May 3, 2022	
MF	(Uruguay) Nicolás Mezquida	(Greece) Volos F.C.	Transfer fee not disclosed.	June 28, 2022	
MF	(Canada) Mark-Anthony Kaye	(Canada) Toronto FC	Toronto receives Kaye, Colorado receives Ralph Priso, $775,000 in GAM, and a 2023 SuperDraft pick. Deal could escalate up to $1.05 million GAM.	July 8, 2022	

==== Loans out ====
Pos.	Player	Loanee club	Length/Notes	Beginning	End	Source
MF	(United States) Cole Bassett	(Netherlands) Feyenoord	18–month loan with an option to buy Recalled on August 13	January 20, 2022	August 13, 2022	
MF	(United States) Cole Bassett	(Netherlands) Fortuna Sittard	Loan through the end of the Eredivisie season	August 13, 2022	June 1, 2023	

== See also ==
- Colorado Rapids
- 2022 in American soccer
- 2022 Major League Soccer season
