= 2017–18 CD Tenerife season =

CD Tenerife
2017–18 season
- Chairman: Miguel Concepción
- Manager: José Luis Martí
- Stadium: Heliodoro Rodríguez López
- Segunda División: 11th
- Copa del Rey: Round of 32
- Top goalscorer: Samuele Longo (12 goals)
Home colours

The 2017–18 season was the 106th season in CD Tenerife’s history.

== Squad ==
As of 30 August 2017

Note: Flags indicate national team as defined under FIFA eligibility rules; some limited exceptions apply. Players may hold more than one non-FIFA nationality.

No.	Pos.	Nation	Player
1	GK	ESP	Carlos Abad
3	DF	ESP	Iñaki Sáenz
4	DF	FRA	Samuel Camille
5	DF	ESP	Alberto Jiménez
6	MF	ESP	Vitolo (2nd captain)
7	FW	ESP	Juan Villar
8	MF	HON	Bryan Acosta
9	FW	SRB	Filip Malbašić
10	MF	ESP	Suso (Captain)
11	FW	ESP	Tyronne
12	FW	ITA	Samuele Longo (on loan from Internazionale)
14	DF	ESP	Carlos Ruiz

No.	Pos.	Nation	Player
16	MF	ESP	Aitor Sanz (3rd captain)
17	MF	ESP	Juan Carlos Real
18	FW	ESP	Víctor
19	DF	ARG	Lucas Aveldaño
20	MF	ESP	Paco Montañés
21	DF	ESP	Jorge Sáenz
23	DF	ESP	Raúl Cámara (4th captain)
25	GK	VEN	Dani Hernández
26	FW	ESP	Brian Martín
27	DF	ESP	Luis Pérez
28	MF	ESP	Nadjib

=== Transfers ===
- List of Spanish football transfers summer 2017#Tenerife

==== In ====
Date	Player	From	Type	Fee	Ref
29 June 2017	(Spain) Juan Villar	(Spain) Valladolid	Transfer	Free	
30 June 2017	(Spain) Carlos Abad	(Spain) Real Madrid B	Loan return	Free	
30 June 2017	(Spain) Álex García	(Spain) Mirandés	Loan return	Free	
30 June 2017	(Spain) Ale González	(Spain) Mensajero	Loan return	Free	
30 June 2017	(Spain) Santi Luque	(Spain) Melilla	Loan return	Free	
5 July 2017	(Spain) Víctor Casadesús	(Spain) Levante	Transfer	Free	
10 July 2017	(Spain) Juan Carlos	(Romania) CFR Cluj	Transfer	Free	
12 July 2017	(Honduras) Bryan Acosta	(Honduras) Real España	Transfer	Free	
14 July 2017	(Argentina) Lucas Aveldaño	(Argentina) Belgrano	Transfer	Free	
15 July 2017	(Spain) Tyronne	(Spain) Las Palmas	Transfer	Free	
21 July 2017	(Spain) Luis Pérez	(Spain) Elche	Transfer	Free	

==== Out ====
Date	Player	To	Type	Fee	Ref
30 June 2017	(Algeria) Rachid Aït-Atmane	(Spain) Sporting Gijón	Loan return	Free	
30 June 2017	(Tunisia) Haythem Jouini	(Tunisia) Espérance Tunis	Loan return	Free	
30 June 2017	(Senegal) Amath	(Spain) Atlético Madrid	Loan return	Free	
30 June 2017	(Honduras) Anthony Lozano	(Honduras) C.D. Olimpia	Loan return	Free	
30 June 2017	(Spain) Tyronne	(Spain) Las Palmas	Loan return	Free	
1 July 2017	(Spain) Edu Oriol	TBD		Free	
3 July 2017	(Spain) Aarón Ñíguez	(Spain) Oviedo	Transfer	Free	
4 July 2017	(Spain) Germán	(Spain) Granada	Transfer	€100K	
5 July 2017	(Spain) Ale González	(Spain) Las Palmas B	Transfer	Free	
8 July 2017	(Spain) Ismael Falcón	(Spain) Hércules	Transfer	Free	
13 July 2017	(Spain) Omar Perdomo	(Spain) Gimnàstic	Loan	Free	
17 July 2017	(Japan) Gaku Shibasaki	(Spain) Getafe	Transfer	Free	
25 July 2017	(Spain) Cristo González	(Spain) Real Madrid B	Transfer	€750K	
5 August 2017	(Spain) Santi Luque	(Spain) Lorca	Transfer	Free	

== Competitions ==
=== Overall ===
Competition	Final position
Segunda División	11th
Copa del Rey	Round of 32

=== Liga ===
==== League table ====
Pos	Team	Pld	W	D	L	GF	GA	GD	Pts
9	Cádiz	42	16	16	10	42	29	+13	64 (Note: Osasuna finished ahead of Cádiz on head-to-head points: Cádiz 0–2 Osasuna, Osasuna 1–0 Cádiz)
10	Granada	42	17	10	15	55	50	+5	61
11	Tenerife	42	15	14	13	58	50	+8	59
12	Lugo	42	15	10	17	39	48	−9	55
13	Alcorcón	42	12	16	14	37	42	−5	52 (Note: Alcorcón finished ahead of Reus and Gimnàstic on head-to-head points: Alcorcón 10 pts, Reus 5 pts, Gimnàstic 1 pt)

Source: La Liga
Rules for classification: 1) points; 2) head-to-head points; 3) head-to-head goal difference; 4) goal difference; 5) number of goals scored

==== Matches ====
Kickoff times are in CET. Win Draw Loss

Match	Opponent	Venue	Result
1	Zaragoza	H	1–0
2	Barcelona B	A	0–3
3	Valladolid	A	2–0
4	Granada	H	2–2
5	Córdoba	A	2–0
6	Alcorcón	H	4–0
7	Lugo	A	1–0
8	Nàstic	H	2–0
9	Oviedo	A	1–1
10	Numancia	H	1–1
11	Lorca	A	2–2
12	Osasuna	H	0–0
13	Sevilla At	A	1–1
14	Cultural	H	2–0
15	Huesca	A	3–0
16	Rayo	H	2–2
17	Almería	A	2–1
18	Reus	H	3–0
19	Sporting	A	3–0
20	Cádiz	H	1–1
21	Albacete	A	1–2

Match	Opponent	Venue	Result
22	Zaragoza	A	1–0
23	Barcelona B	H	1–3
24	Valladolid	H	0–0
25	Granada	A	2–1
26	Córdoba	H	5–1
27	Alcorcón	A	1–1
28	Lugo	H	3–1
29	Nàstic	A	1–2
30	Oviedo	H	3–1
31	Numancia	A	2–0
32	Lorca	H	2–0
33	Osasuna	A	0–1
34	Sevilla At	H	2–0
35	Cultural	A	3–2
36	Huesca	H	2–4
37	Rayo	A	3–1
38	Almería	H	0–0
39	Reus	A	1–1
40	Sporting	H	1–0
41	Cádiz	A	1–1
42	Albacete	H	1–1
