= Walter Williams (footballer) =

Honduran footballer (1983–2018)

Personal information
- Full name: José Walter Williams Castillo
- Date of birth: 30 September 1983
- Place of birth: La Ceiba, Honduras
- Date of death: 11 December 2018 (aged 35)
- Place of death: La Ceiba, Honduras
- Height: 1.75 m (5 ft 9 in)
- Position: Full-back

Senior career*
Years	Team	Apps	(Gls)
2005–2007	Victoria		
2008–2010	Vida		
2011	Atlético Choloma		
2012	Parrillas One		
2012–2014	Real Sociedad	53	(1)
2014	Marathón		

International career
2014	Honduras	1	(0)
- * Club domestic league appearances and goals as of 5 February 2014

José Walter Williams Castillo (30 September 1983 – 11 December 2018) was a Honduran footballer who played as a full-back for several clubs in the Honduran Liga Nacional.

== International career ==
On 28 June 2013, Williams was called up to the Honduras national team by Luis Fernando Suárez for the 2013 CONCACAF Gold Cup. However, he could not join the team due to a visa problem. Then on 26 February 2014 he was again summoned by Luis Fernando Suárez (in preparation for the 2014 FIFA World Cup) for the friendly match against Venezuela in San Pedro Sula. He earned his first senior cap on 5 March, playing the first 46 minutes before being substituted by Bryan Acosta in the 2–1 win over the South Americans.

== Death ==
Williams died on 11 December 2018 in La Ceiba at the age of 35 due to a stroke.
