= Sam Nicholson =

Scottish footballer

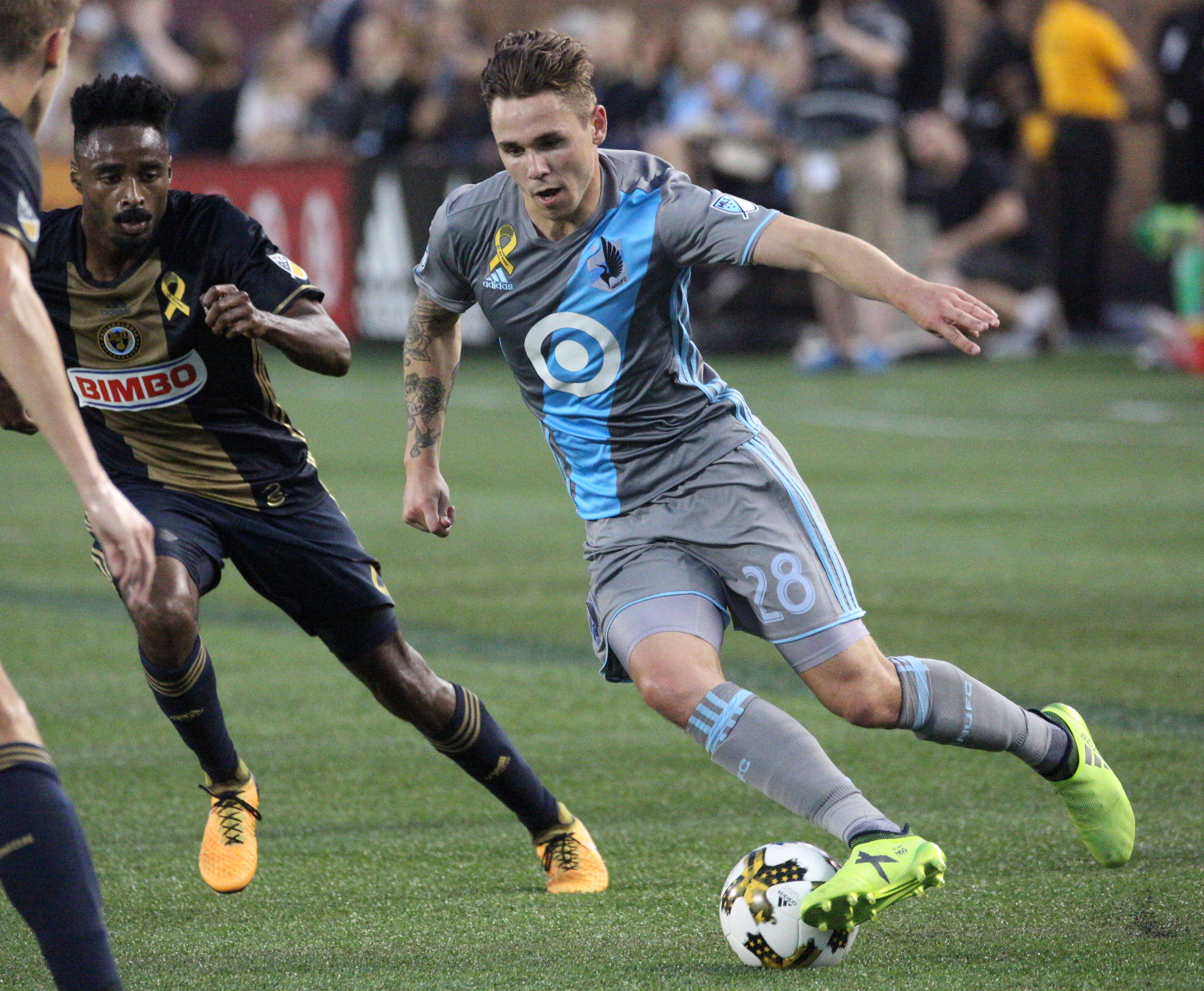
- Nicholson playing for Minnesota United in 2017

Personal information
- Full name: Sam Alastair Nicholson
- Date of birth: 20 January 1995 (age 31)
- Place of birth: Edinburgh, Scotland
- Height: 5 ft 9 in (1.75 m)
- Position: Winger

Team information
- Current team: Livingston
- Number: 10

Youth career
- 2007–2013: Heart of Midlothian

Senior career*
Years	Team	Apps	(Gls)
2013–2017	Heart of Midlothian	109	(13)
2017–2018	Minnesota United	20	(2)
2018–2020	Colorado Rapids	48	(4)
2020–2022	Bristol Rovers	64	(11)
2022–2024	Colorado Rapids	37	(2)
2023	Colorado Rapids 2	1	(0)
2024	→ Motherwell (loan)	16	(2)
2024–2026	Motherwell	19	(0)
2026–	Livingston	0	(0)

International career
2013	Scotland U18	1	(0)
2013–2014	Scotland U19	6	(0)
2015–2016	Scotland U21	8	(0)
- * Club domestic league appearances and goals as of 15 May 2026

Sam Alastair Nicholson (born 20 January 1995) is a Scottish footballer who plays as a left winger or left midfielder for Scottish Championship club Livingston.

== Career ==
=== Heart of Midlothian ===
Nicholson attended Penicuik High School in Midlothian and grew up supporting Heart of Midlothian. He joined Hearts aged 12, progressing through their youth teams until on 31 August 2013, he made his senior debut for the club, coming on as a 74th-minute substitute in a Scottish Premiership match against Inverness Caledonian Thistle, replacing Jamie Walker in a 2–0 defeat. His first senior goal for the side came on 18 January 2014, helping Hearts come from 3–1 down at McDiarmid Park scoring in the 89th minute to help Hearts earn a point in a 3–3 draw against St Johnstone.

On 16 June 2014, Nicholson signed a new three-year contract extending his stay until the summer of 2017, following the club's relegation to the Scottish Championship.

Nicholson began the 2014–15 season by setting up a goal for Osman Sow at Ibrox in stoppage time. He scored his first goal of the season against Hibs in the Edinburgh Derby; a solo effort after he nutmegged Scott Robertson and hit a left-footed drive beyond the keeper.

=== Minnesota United ===
On 28 June 2017, it was confirmed that Nicholson agreed to a contract with MLS side Minnesota United FC, and would be eligible to join the team on 10 July 2017.

=== Colorado Rapids ===
Nicholson was traded from Minnesota to Colorado Rapids on 1 May 2018. Colorado also received an International Roster slot. Minnesota received Eric Miller and $50,000 of General Allocation Money in return.

=== Bristol Rovers ===
On 22 July 2020, Nicholson returned to the UK, delighted to sign for League One club Bristol Rovers. He made his debut for the club on 5 September 2020, in a 3-0 League Cup defeat to Ipswich Town. Nicholson scored his first goal for the club on 31 October 2020, opening the scoring in a 1–1 draw at Rochdale, driving forward with the ball before firing in from the edge of the box. In late March 2021, Rovers' manager Joey Barton announced that Nicholson would miss the rest of the season as Rovers would fight against the drop, due to the fact that he was to have surgery on his hip, which it was announced in April 2021 he had still yet to have had the operation and would likely miss the start of the 2021–22 season also.

Nicholson opened his account for the 2021–22 season as he opened the scoring in a League Two 1–1 draw with Barrow, who had been reduced to ten men. The season ended in success for Nicholson and Rovers as a 7–0 victory on the final day of the season saw Rovers move into the final automatic promotion place on goals scored.

=== Return to Colorado ===
On 17 June 2022, it was announced that Nicholson had re-joined MLS side Colorado Rapids on a two-and-a-half-year deal. Nicholson made his second debut for the club in a 2–2 comeback draw with Real Salt Lake.

On 13 October 2023, it was announced that Nicholson had undergone ankle surgery to decompress the anterior and posterior right ankle joint, causing him to miss the final two games of the season.

Nicholson was waived by Colorado on 2 January 2024.

=== Motherwell ===
On 23 January 2024, Nicholson joined Scottish Premiership club Motherwell on loan until the end of the season. On 31 May 2024, Motherwell announced that they had signed Nicholson to a permanent two-year contract.

Nicholson was at the centre of a highly controversial incident at the end of Motherwell's league tie against Celtic at Fir Park on 13 May 2026. In the fifth and final minute of injury time, with the score at 2-2, he challenged Celtic centre back Auston Trusty for the ball in the Motherwell penalty box. After Nicholson handled the ball away, Trusty went down holding the side of his face and, though referee John Beaton initially waved play on, he was eventually asked to go and look at the VAR. Upon inspection, Beaton decided that Nicholson's hand had made contact with the ball during the header and gave a penalty to Celtic. The penalty was converted by Kelechi Iheanacho to win the game 3-2, meaning that Celtic remained one point behind Hearts in a dramatic title race.

=== Livingston ===
It was announced on 16 May 2026 that Nicholson would be joining Livingston after his Motherwell contract expired.

== Career statistics ==
As of 13 May 2026

Appearances and goals by club, season and competition
Club	Season	League			Domestic Cup (Note: Includes the Scottish Cup, U.S. Open Cup and FA Cup)		League Cup (Note: Includes appearances in the Scottish League Cup and EFL Cup)		Continental		Other		Total	
Club	Season	Division	Apps	Goals	Apps	Goals	Apps	Goals	Apps	Goals	Apps	Goals	Apps	Goals
Heart of Midlothian	2013–14	Scottish Premiership	25	2	0	0	1	0	–		–		26	2
Heart of Midlothian	2014–15	Scottish Championship	29	5	0	0	1	0	–		1 (Note: Appearance in the Scottish Challenge Cup)	0	31	5
Heart of Midlothian	2015–16	Scottish Premiership	36	3	3	1	4	1	–		–		43	5
Heart of Midlothian	2016–17	Scottish Premiership	19	3	3	0	1	0	4 (Note: Appearances in the UEFA Europa League)	0	–		27	3
Heart of Midlothian	Total		109	13	6	1	7	1	4	0	1	0	127	15
Minnesota United	2017	MLS	12	1	0	0	–		–		–		12	1
Minnesota United	2018	MLS	8	1	0	0	–		–		–		8	1
Minnesota United	Total		20	2	0	0	0	0	0	0	0	0	20	2
Colorado Rapids	2018	MLS	19	2	1	0	–		0	0	–		20	2
Colorado Rapids	2019	MLS	27	2	1	0	–		–		0	0	28	2
Colorado Rapids	2020	MLS	2	0	0	0	–		–		0	0	2	0
Colorado Rapids	Total		48	4	2	0	0	0	0	0	0	0	50	4
Bristol Rovers	2020–21	League One	30	6	2	1	1	0	—		2 (Note: Appearances in EFL Trophy)	1	35	8
Bristol Rovers	2021–22	League Two	34	5	4	0	0	0	—		2	1	40	6
Bristol Rovers	Total		64	11	6	1	1	0	0	0	4	2	75	14
Colorado Rapids	2022	MLS	15	1	0	0	0	0	—		0	0	15	1
Colorado Rapids	2023	MLS	22	1	2	1	—		2	0	0	0	26	2
Colorado Rapids	Total		37	2	2	1	0	0	2	0	0	0	41	3
Motherwell	2023–24	Scottish Premiership	16	2	0	0	0	0	0	0	0	0	16	2
Motherwell	2024–25	Scottish Premiership	9	0	1	0	0	0	0	0	0	0	10	0
Motherwell	2025–26	Scottish Premiership	10	0	1	0	0	0	0	0	0	0	11	0
Motherwell	Total		35	2	2	0	0	0	0	0	0	0	37	2
Career total			303	34	16	3	8	1	6	0	5	2	349	40

== Honours ==
Heart of Midlothian

- Scottish Championship: 2014–15

Bristol Rovers

- EFL League Two third-place promotion: 2021–22
