= Bryan Acosta =

Honduran football player (born 1993)

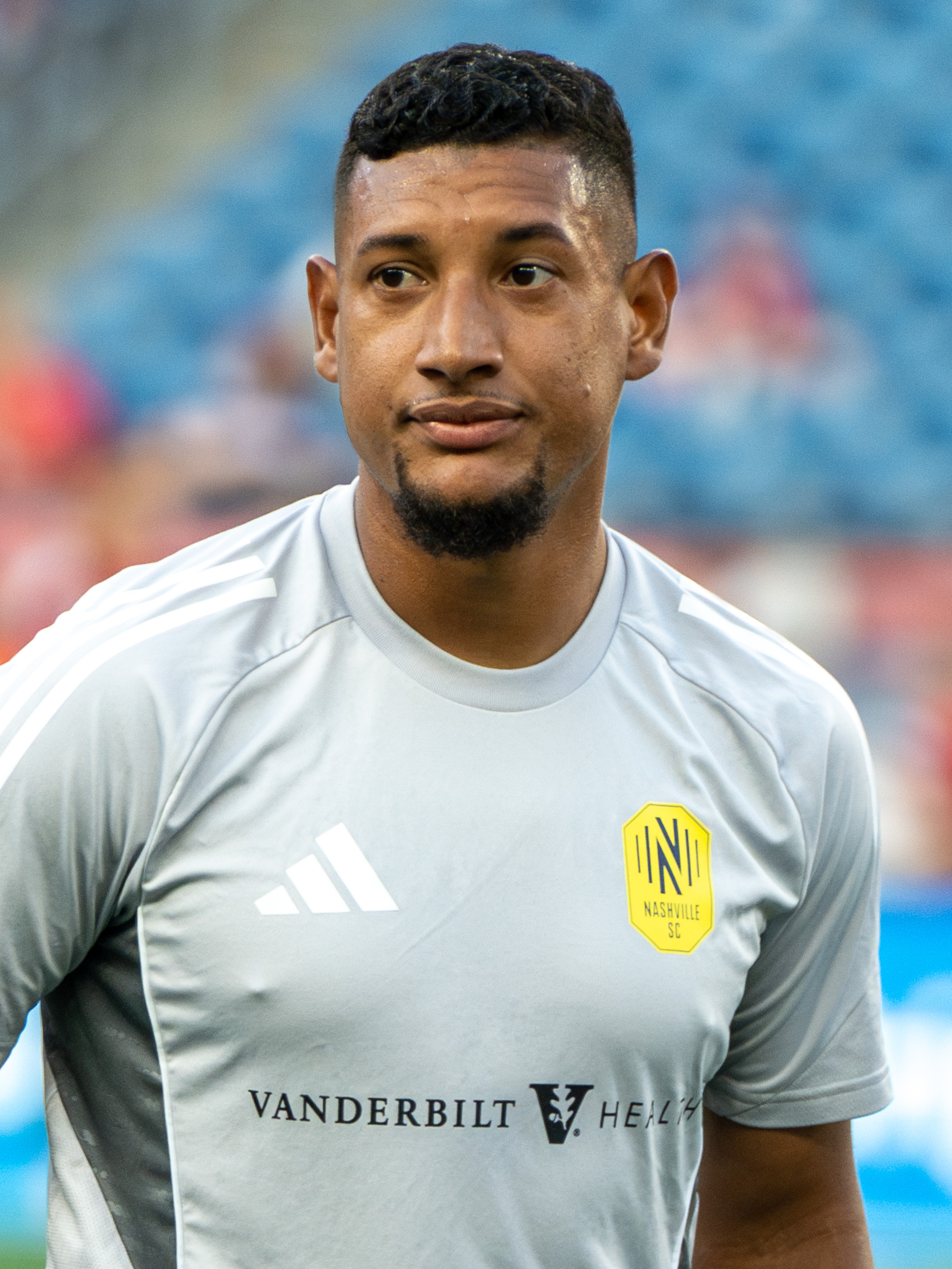
- Acosta with Nashville SC in 2025

Personal information
- Full name: Bryan Josué Acosta Ramos
- Date of birth: 24 November 1993 (age 32)
- Place of birth: La Ceiba, Honduras
- Height: 1.75 m (5 ft 9 in)
- Position: Midfielder

Team information
- Current team: Nashville SC
- Number: 6

Youth career
- –2013: Real España

Senior career*
Years	Team	Apps	(Gls)
2013–2017	Real España	129	(19)
2017–2019	Tenerife	47	(5)
2019–2021	FC Dallas	60	(2)
2022–2023	Colorado Rapids	40	(0)
2022	Colorado Rapids 2	2	(0)
2023	Portland Timbers	7	(0)
2024	Gaziantep	1	(0)
2024–2025	Real España	15	(1)
2025–	Nashville SC	9	(0)
2025	→ Huntsville City FC (loan)	1	(0)

International career^{‡}
2013	Honduras U20	4	(0)
2015–2016	Honduras U23	10	(0)
2014–	Honduras	70	(2)
- * Club domestic league appearances and goals as of 22 July 2025 ‡ National team caps and goals as of 14 October 2024

Bryan Josué Acosta Ramos (born 24 November 1993) is a Honduran professional footballer who plays as a midfielder for Major League Soccer club Nashville SC and the Honduras national team.

== Club career ==
Born in La Ceiba, Honduras, Acosta started his professional career with Real C.D. España. He made his debut on 23 September 2013 in a 1–1 draw with C.D.S. Vida. He scored his first goal on 16 April 2014 in a 2–1 loss to C.D. Victoria.

On 12 July 2017, Acosta signed a four-year deal with Spanish side CD Tenerife. He made his debut on 18 August 2017 in the Segunda División against Real Zaragoza in a 2–1 win. He scored his first goal the following 30 November in a 2–1 loss to RCD Espanyol in the first leg of the round of 32 tie in the Copa del Rey.

On 8 January 2019, Acosta signed for Major League Soccer side FC Dallas as a Designated Player. He made his debut on the following 2 March in a 1–1 draw with New England Revolution and scored his first goal seven days later in the 2–0 win against the LA Galaxy. Following the 2021 season, Acosta's contract option was declined by Dallas.

During the 2021 MLS Re-Entry Draft, Acosta's rights were selected by the Colorado Rapids. He officially signed with the Rapids on 19 January 2022.

On 1 August 2023, the Portland Timbers acquired Acosta from the Rapids for $350,000 in General Allocation Money.

== International career ==
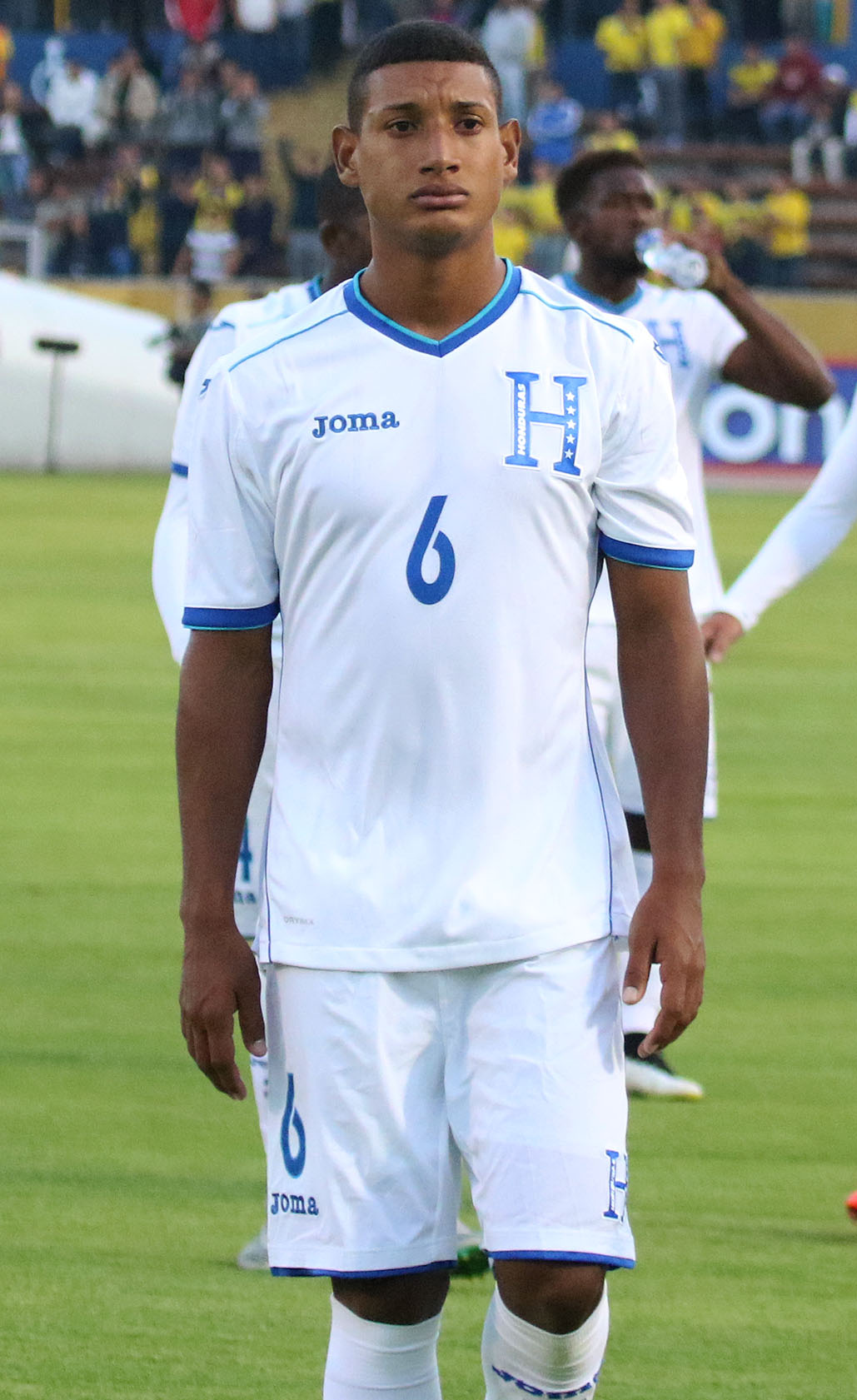
Acosta with Honduras in 2015

=== Honduras U-23 ===
Acosta was chosen to represent Honduras at the 2016 Summer Olympics in Rio de Janeiro. He captained his team throughout the tournament and played in all 6 matches, including the bronze medal match, in which Honduras 3–2 to Nigeria.

=== Honduras ===
On 26 February 2014, Acosta was called up for a friendly against Venezuela. He made his debut for the national team the following 6 March after coming off the bench to replace Walter Williams in a 2–1 win.

== Personal life ==
He was born to Raymundo Acosta and Adilia Ramos.

Acosta had to receive permission from Real España to get a few hours off to marry his fiancée Mavis Hernández on Friday 21 August 2015, a day before the club had to play the Clásico Sampedrano against Marathón. The ceremony was led by former footballer Carlos Oliva, but was not attended by any of his teammates because of the forthcoming derby game.

== Career statistics ==
=== Club ===
As of match played 1 August 2023

Appearances and goals by club, season and competition
Club	Season	League			Cup		Continental		Other		Total	
Club	Season	Division	Apps	Goals	Apps	Goals	Apps	Goals	Apps	Goals	Apps	Goals
Real España	2013–14	Liga Nacional	30	1	—		—		—		30	1
Real España	2014–15	Liga Nacional	38	4	—		4 (Note: Appearance(s) in CONCACAF Champions League)	0	—		42	4
Real España	2015–16	Liga Nacional	28	5	—		—		—		28	5
Real España	2016–17	Liga Nacional	33	9	—		—		—		33	9
Real España	Total		129	19	—		4	0	—		133	19
Tenerife	2017–18	Segunda División	31	3	3	1	—		—		34	4
Tenerife	2018–19	Segunda División	16	2	1	0	—		—		17	2
Tenerife	Total		47	5	4	1	—		—		51	6
FC Dallas	2019	MLS	26	2	0	0	—		1 (Note: Appearance(s) in MLS Cup Playoffs)	1	27	3
FC Dallas	2020	MLS	11	0	— (Note: 2020 U.S. Open Cup cancelled due to COVID-19 pandemic)		—		0	0	11	0
FC Dallas	2021	MLS	23	0	— (Note: 2021 U.S. Open Cup cancelled due to COVID-19 pandemic)		—		0	0	23	0
FC Dallas	Total		60	2	0	0	0	0	1	1	61	3
Colorado Rapids	2022	MLS	26	0	1	0	2	0	0	0	29	0
Colorado Rapids	2023	MLS	14	0	1	0	0	0	1 (Note: Appearance(s) in the Leagues Cup)	0	16	0
Colorado Rapids	Total		40	0	2	0	2	0	1	0	45	0
Career total			276	26	6	1	6	0	2	1	290	28

=== International ===
As of 14 October 2024

Appearances and goals by national team and year
National team	Year	Apps	Goals
Honduras	2014	3	0
Honduras	2015	12	0
Honduras	2016	6	1
Honduras	2017	10	0
Honduras	2018	3	0
Honduras	2019	9	1
Honduras	2021	13	0
Honduras	2022	3	0
Honduras	2023	9	0
Honduras	2024	2	0
Total		70	2

=== International goals ===
Scores and results list Honduras' goal tally first.

Goal	Date	Venue	Opponent	Score	Result	Competition
1.	8 October 2016	FFB Field, Belmopan, Belize	Belize	1–0	2–1	Friendly
2.	25 June 2019	Banc of California Stadium, Los Angeles, United States	El Salvador	3–0	4–0	2019 CONCACAF Gold Cup
