= Lucas Esteves =

Brazilian footballer (born 2000)

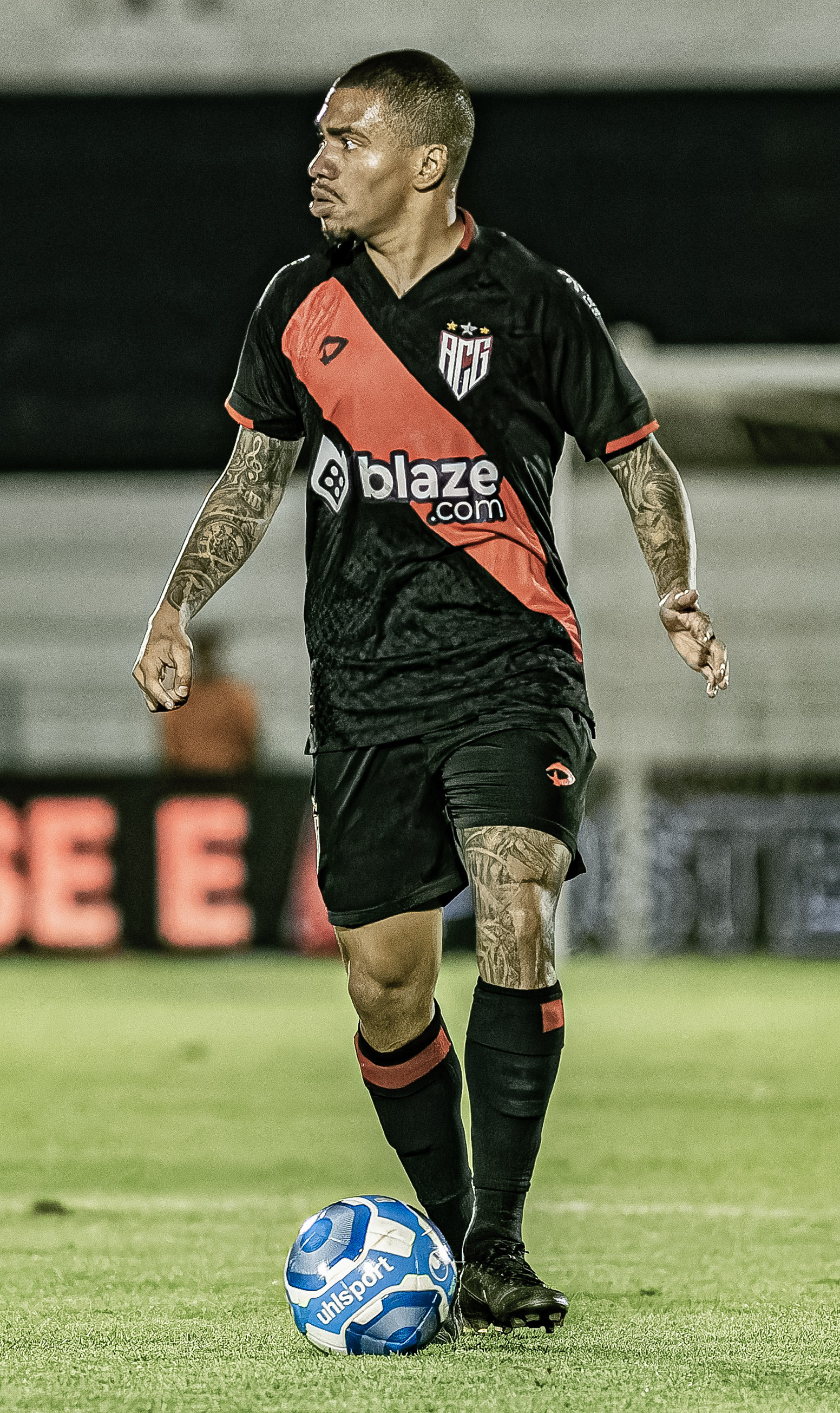
- Esteves playing for Atlético Goianiense in 2023

Personal information
- Full name: Lucas Esteves Souza
- Date of birth: 24 June 2000 (age 26)
- Place of birth: São Paulo, Brazil
- Height: 1.70 m (5 ft 7 in)
- Position: Left-back

Team information
- Current team: Atlético San Luis
- Number: 16

Youth career
- 2014–2019: Palmeiras

Senior career*
Years	Team	Apps	(Gls)
2019–2023	Palmeiras	22	(1)
2021–2022	→ Colorado Rapids (loan)	44	(2)
2023	→ Fortaleza (loan)	2	(0)
2023	→ Atlético Goianiense (loan)	16	(0)
2024–2025	Vitória	46	(1)
2025–2026	Grêmio	16	(0)
2026–	Atlético San Luis	0	(0)
- * Club domestic league appearances and goals as of 30 January 2026

Lucas Esteves Souza (born 24 June 2000) is a Brazilian footballer who plays as a left-back for Liga MX club Atlético San Luis.

== Career statistics ==
=== Club ===
As of 18 May 2022

Club	Season	League			State league		Cup		Continental		Other		Total	
Club	Season	Division	Apps	Goals	Apps	Goals	Apps	Goals	Apps	Goals	Apps	Goals	Apps	Goals
Palmeiras	2019	Série A	0	0	1 (Note: Appearances in the Campeonato Paulista)	0	0	0	0	0	—		1	0
Palmeiras	2020	Série A	10	0	0	0	1	0	1 (Note: Appearances in the Copa Libertadores)	0	0	0	12	0
Palmeiras	2021	Série A	1	0	11	1	0	0	1	0	1 (Note: Appearances in the Recopa Sudamericana)	0	14	1
Palmeiras	Total		11	0	12	1	1	0	2	0	1	0	27	1
Colorado Rapids (loan)	2021	Major League Soccer	14	1	—		—		—		0	0	14	1
Colorado Rapids (loan)	2022	Major League Soccer	11	1	—		—		2	0	0	0	13	1
Colorado Rapids (loan)	Total		25	2	0	0	0	0	2	0	0	0	27	2
Career total			36	2	12	1	1	0	4	0	1	0	54	3

== Honours ==
Palmeiras

- Campeonato Paulista: 2020
- Copa do Brasil: 2020
- Copa Libertadores: 2020
- Recopa Sudamericana runner-up: 2021

Fortaleza

- Campeonato Cearense: 2023
