= Ale González =

Spanish footballer

Personal information
- Full name: Alejandro González Hernández
- Date of birth: 18 December 1994 (age 31)
- Place of birth: Las Palmas, Spain
- Height: 1.76 m (5 ft 9 1/2 in)
- Position: Winger

Team information
- Current team: Panadería Pulido

Youth career
- Las Torres
- Las Palmas
- Universidad LP
- Acodetti

Senior career*
Years	Team	Apps	(Gls)
2013–2014	Acodetti	?	(16)
2014–2015	Sporting San José	35	(19)
2015–2016	Tenerife B	31	(13)
2016–2017	Tenerife	3	(0)
2016–2017	→ Mensajero (loan)	34	(6)
2017–2018	Las Palmas B	19	(0)
2018–2022	Mensajero	96	(18)
2022–	Panadería Pulido	70	(27)
- * Club domestic league appearances and goals as of 12 October 2024

Alejandro "Ale" González Hernández (born 18 December 1994) is a Spanish footballer who plays for Panadería Pulido mainly as a right winger.

== Club career ==
Born in Las Palmas, Canary Islands, González finished his formation with Acodetti CF, and made his debut as a senior with the club in the regional leagues, in 2013. The following year he moved to Real Sporting San José, being an important unit during his first and only campaign at San José in Tercera División, as his club only missed out another promotion in the play-offs.

On 2 July 2015 González and his brother joined CD Tenerife, being initially assigned to the reserves also in the fourth tier. On 19 March 2016, he scored a hat-trick with the B-side in a 3–0 home win against San Fernando CD, taking his tally up to 12 goals. Seven days later he made his first team debut, coming on as a late substitute for Suso Santana in a 0–0 Segunda División away draw against CA Osasuna.

On 30 August 2016, González was loaned to CD Mensajero in Segunda División B, for one year. Upon returning he moved to another reserve team, UD Las Palmas Atlético also in the third division.

On 18 June 2018, González returned to Mensajero, now in a permanent deal and with the side in the fourth division.

== Personal life ==
González's twin brother Óscar is also a footballer. A defender, he too was groomed at Acodetti. His father, also named Óscar, represented UD Las Palmas in the early 1990s.
