= Max Alves =

Brazilian football player

Personal information
- Full name: Max Alves da Silva
- Date of birth: 12 May 2001 (age 25)
- Place of birth: Juiz de Fora, Brazil
- Height: 1.75 m (5 ft 9 in)
- Position: Attacking midfielder

Team information
- Current team: Chapecoense (on loan from Cuiabá)
- Number: 22

Youth career
- 2016–2017: Uberabinha
- 2018: AMDH
- 2019–2020: Tupi
- 2020–2021: Flamengo

Senior career*
Years	Team	Apps	(Gls)
2021–2022	Flamengo	12	(1)
2021	→ Cuiabá (loan)	15	(1)
2022–2023	Colorado Rapids	36	(1)
2022	Colorado Rapids 2	4	(1)
2024–	Cuiabá	66	(5)
2026	→ Sport Recife (loan)	9	(1)
2026–	→ Chapecoense(loan)	1	(0)
- * Club domestic league appearances and goals as of 16 April 2026

Max Alves da Silva (born 12 May 2001), simply known as Max, is a Brazilian footballer who plays as an attacking midfielder for Chapecoense, on loan from Cuiabá.

== Career ==
=== Early career ===
Born in Juiz de Fora, Minas Gerais, Max Alves joined Flamengo's youth setup in January 2020, from Tupi.

=== Flamengo ===
Max Alves made his first team debut on 3 March 2021, coming on as a second-half substitute for Daniel Cabral in a 1–0 Campeonato Carioca home win over Nova Iguaçu, and also scoring the game's only goal. He made his Série A debut on 13 June, replacing Bruno Henrique late into a 2–0 home success over América Mineiro.

==== Cuiabá (loan) ====
On 17 September 2021, Max Alves was loaned to fellow top tier side Cuiabá until the end of the year.

=== Colorado Rapids ===
On 6 January 2022, Max Alves signed a four-year deal with Major League Soccer (MLS) side Colorado Rapids.

==== Suspension ====
On 10 May 2023, ESPN reported that Max Alves had been suspended by the Colorado Rapids in connection with alleged unlawful sports gambling. According to a source with knowledge of the situation, and subsequently by a report in O Globo, Alves was suspended for his involvement in the 2023 Brazilian football match-fixing scandal being investigated by prosecutors in Goiás state, Brazil. The Rapids released a statement acknowledging that a player had been suspended, but did not identify him by name. MLS followed with a statement on the same day that both a current and former player were involved in unlawful gambling. The league's statement mirrored that of the Rapids, emphasizing its commitment to protecting the integrity of the game.

The Goiás investigation had resulted in charges against 16 people, including seven professional soccer players, of alleged match fixing. Prosecutors did not name any of the players involved, though five players in Brazil were also suspended by their clubs. According to a Public Ministry of Goiás spreadsheet and text messages obtained by O Globo, an organization paid Alves BRL 60,000 (US$12,000) to receive a yellow card in a match against the LA Galaxy on 17 September 2022, which he did within two minutes of being substituted into the match. The report also indicated that Max Alves connected former Houston Dynamo player Zeca with the same organization, and that he was supposed to take part in match fixing on 8 October 2022.

As of 11 May 2023, MLS is investigating the matter, and Alves remains suspended from all team activities. The league has not yet released any further information regarding the investigation or the status of Alves' suspension. Alves' agent Régis Oliveira reported to newspaper Tribuna de Minas that Max Alves intended to return to Brazil from the United States and cooperate with prosecutors.

=== Cuibá return ===
On 8 January 2024, Max Alves returned to his former side Cuiabá on a permanent deal.

== Career statistics ==
As of 24 September 2022

Club	Season	League			Cup		Continental		Other		Total	
Club	Season	Division	Apps	Goals	Apps	Goals	Apps	Goals	Apps	Goals	Apps	Goals
Flamengo	Série A	2021	6	0	2	0	0	0	6 (Note: Appearance(s) in Campeonato Carioca.)	1	14	1
Cuiabá (loan)	Série A	2021	15	1	—		—		—		15	1
Colorado Rapids	MLS	2022	26	0	1	0	2	1	0	0	29	1
Colorado Rapids 2 (loan)	MLS Next Pro	2022	4	1	—		—		—		4	1
Career total			51	2	3	0	2	1	6	1	62	4

== Honours ==
Flamengo

- Campeonato Carioca: 2021
