= Auston Trusty =

American soccer player (born 1998)

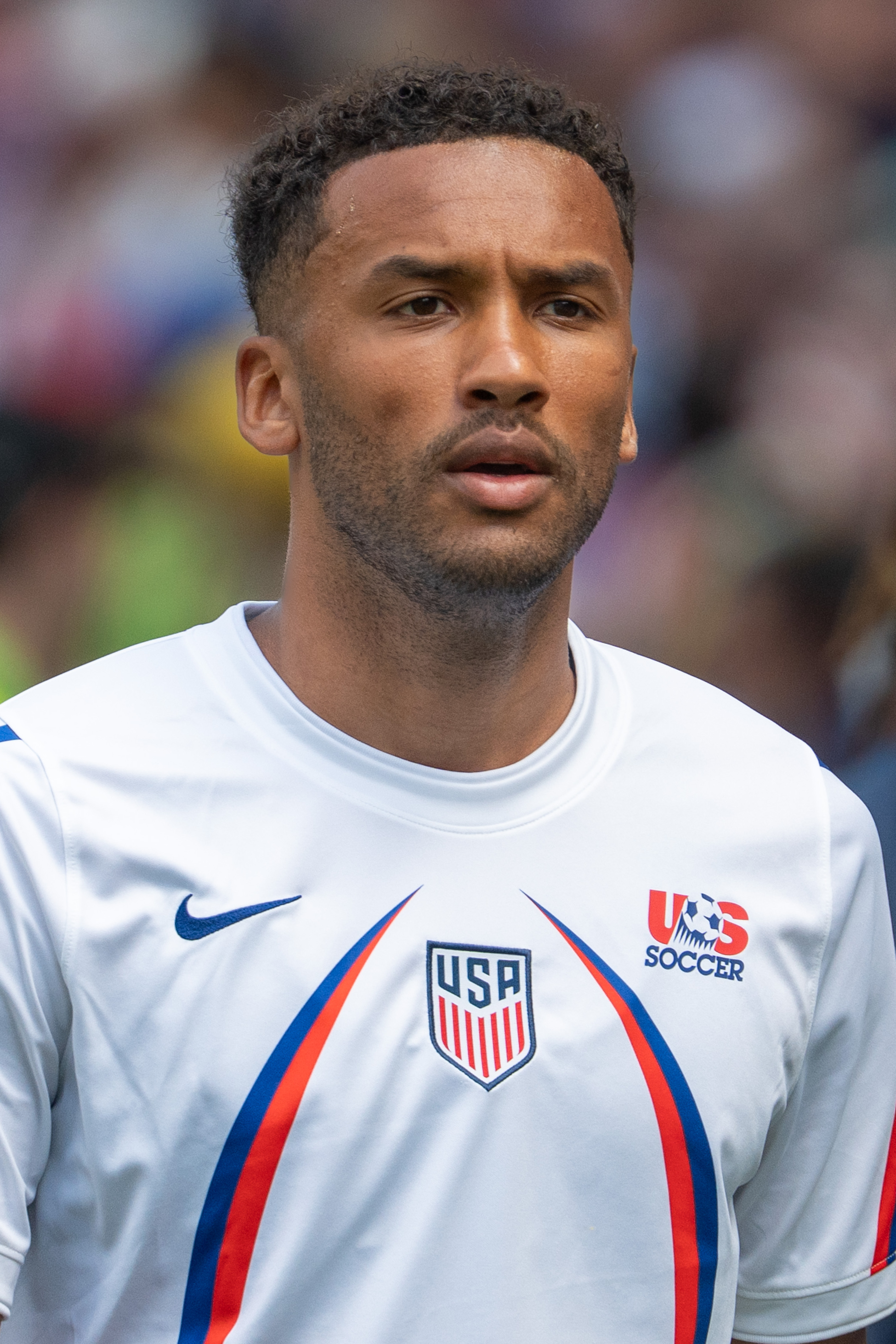
- Trusty with the United States in 2026

Personal information
- Full name: Auston Levi-Jesaiah Trusty
- Date of birth: August 12, 1998 (age 28)
- Place of birth: Media, Pennsylvania, U.S.
- Height: 6 ft 3 in (1.90 m)
- Position: Defender

Team information
- Current team: Celtic
- Number: 6

Youth career
- 2011–2016: Philadelphia Union

Senior career*
Years	Team	Apps	(Gls)
2016–2017	Bethlehem Steel	44	(0)
2017–2019	Philadelphia Union	56	(2)
2019–2022	Colorado Rapids	41	(1)
2022–2023	Arsenal	0	(0)
2022	→ Colorado Rapids (loan)	16	(0)
2022–2023	→ Birmingham City (loan)	44	(4)
2023–2024	Sheffield United	33	(0)
2024–	Celtic	48	(1)

International career^{‡}
2015	United States U17	1	(0)
2016	United States U19	6	(0)
2016–2017	United States U20	10	(1)
2019	United States U23	2	(0)
2023–	United States	16	(2)
Medal record
Men's soccer
Representing United States
CONCACAF U-20 Championship
Winner	2017
CONCACAF Nations League
Winner	2023
- * Club domestic league appearances and goals as of November 11, 2026 ‡ National team caps and goals as of November 17, 2026

Auston Levi-Jesaiah Trusty (born August 12, 1998) is an American professional soccer player who plays as a center-back for Scottish Premiership club Celtic and the United States national team.

In club soccer, Trusty played in the USL Championship for Bethlehem Steel and in Major League Soccer for the Philadelphia Union and the Colorado Rapids before signing for Premier League club Arsenal, and spent the 2022–23 season on loan to Birmingham City of the EFL Championship. In August 2023, Trusty signed for Sheffield United, for which he made his Premier League debut. He moved on to Celtic in 2024. Internationally, he represented his country at under-age levels before making his senior debut in March 2023. He represented his country at the 2026 FIFA World Cup.

== Early life ==
Trusty was born in Media, Pennsylvania. He is the youngest of six children. All of his siblings played collegiate soccer. His sister, Onnie Nicholson, also played internationally.

He began playing soccer with Nether United Soccer Club in Wallingford. He attended and played for Penncrest High School before joining the SockerClub youth setup of the Philadelphia Union in 2011.

== Club career ==
=== Bethlehem Steel ===
In 2016, Trusty signed an amateur United Soccer League contract with the Philadelphia Union reserve affiliate Bethlehem Steel. The contract with the Steel allowed Trusty to remain eligible to play college soccer with the North Carolina Tar Heels. He made his debut for the Steel on April 10, 2016, against New York Red Bulls II, starting in the 4–0 defeat.

Trusty would go on to play 44 games for the Bethlehem Steel within two seasons.

=== Philadelphia Union ===
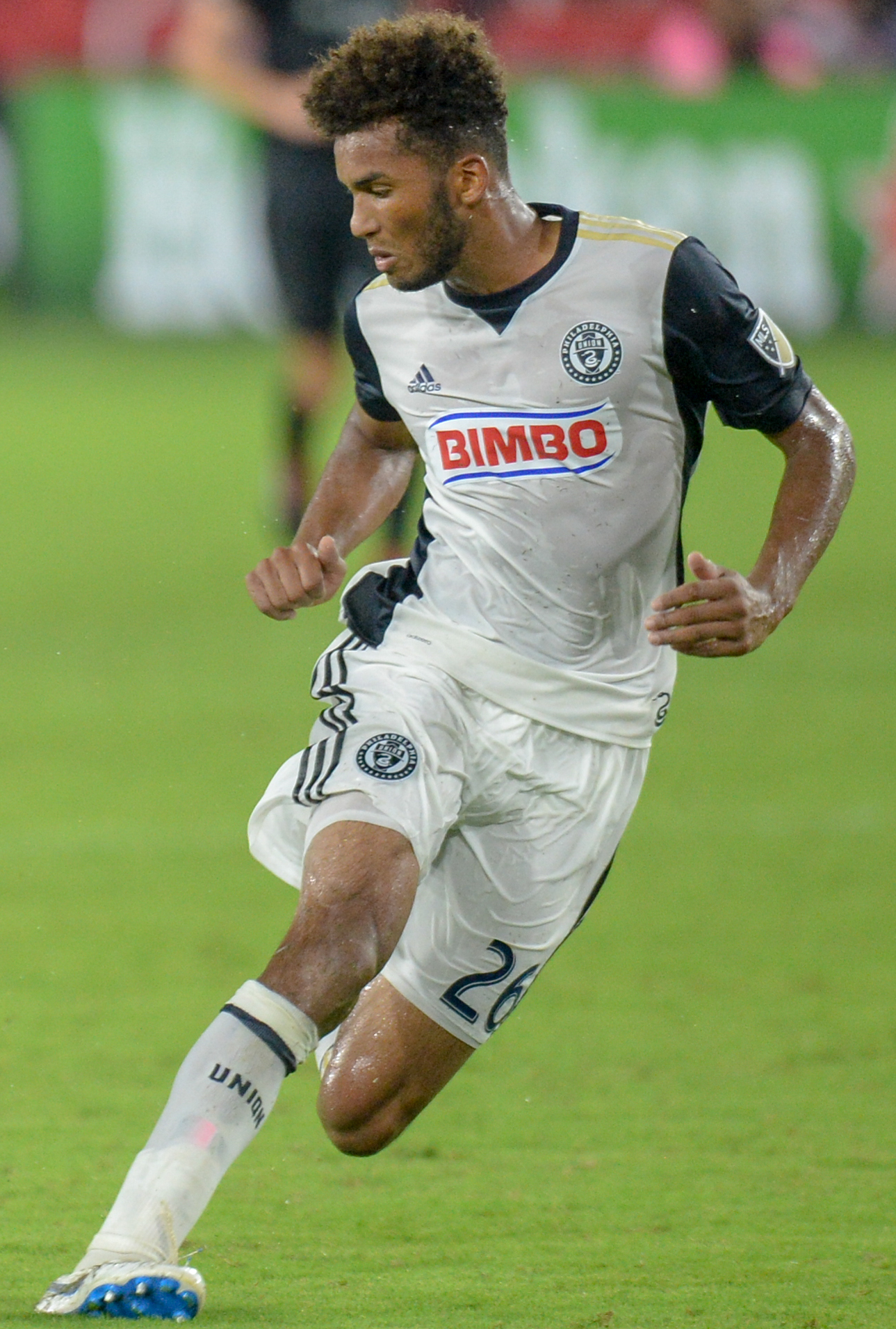
Trusty with the Philadelphia Union in 2018.

On August 10, 2016, Trusty signed a homegrown player deal with the Philadelphia Union, electing not to join the Tar Heels. Despite his signing, Trusty did not make his debut for the Union until March 3, 2018, in the club's season opener against the New England Revolution.

He finished his first season with the Union having played every minute of the season as the club finished sixth in the Eastern Conference. He also scored his first professional goal on September 15 against the Montreal Impact, a 4–1 defeat.

Going into the 2019 season, Trusty continued his game streak, playing in an additional seven matches before being sent off during a match against the LA Galaxy on April 13. Following his suspension, Trusty would start 15 more matches until July 2019.

=== Colorado Rapids ===
On November 20, 2019, Trusty was traded to the Colorado Rapids in exchange for up to $750,000 in allocation money, including performance-based thresholds, as well as a percentage of a future transfer. He made his debut for the club on July 17, 2020, against Sporting Kansas City in the MLS is Back Tournament, coming off the bench. Following his debut season with the Rapids, Trusty signed a new contract on December 16, keeping him with the club through the 2023 season.

=== Arsenal ===
On January 31, 2022, Trusty signed with Premier League club Arsenal, although he would stay on loan with the Colorado Rapids until July 17, 2022. He played his last game for the Rapids on July 5, returned to Arsenal, and was immediately loaned to EFL Championship club Birmingham City for the 2022–23 season.

==== Loan to Birmingham City ====
Trusty made his competitive debut in English football on July 30, 2022, in his new club's opening-day 0–0 draw at Luton Town. He scored his first two goals in England in Birmingham's 3–0 win against Bristol City on October 8. His own goal caused Birmingham's elimination from the FA Cup at the hands of Blackburn Rovers, but he redeemed himself four days later with the winning goal in the seventh minute of stoppage time of the Championship match away to Swansea City.

As of February 10, Trusty had played every minute of every league match throughout the season. He finished the season with 44 appearances in all competitions and four goals, and was voted Player of the Season by Blues supporters.

=== Sheffield United ===
On August 3, 2023, Trusty signed for newly promoted Sheffield United. He made his Premier League debut on September 16 in a 2–1 loss away to Tottenham Hotspur. He scored his first goal for Sheffield United on August 13, 2024, in an EFL Cup tie against Wrexham.

=== Celtic ===
On August 30, 2024, Trusty signed with Scottish Premiership club Celtic on a five-year contract. The move saw him join his international teammate, and fellow centre back, Cameron Carter-Vickers.

He made his debut in the UEFA Champions League against Slovan Bratislava on September 18. He scored his first goal on January 4, 2025, netting the second goal as the Bhoys beat St Mirren 3–0 at Celtic Park in the Scottish Premiership.

After coming on as a substitute during the second leg of Celtic's Champions League play-off against Kairat Almaty on August 26, 2025, Trusty tore his plantar fascia, which ruled him out of action for several weeks and left him struggling to walk. Even after returning to training, he did not make a further appearance under Brendan Rodgers, who preferred the partnership of Carter-Vickers and Liam Scales. Rodgers resigned as manager on October 27 and Trusty finally made his comeback when interim manager Martin O'Neill gave him his first start of the season in 4-0 league victory over Falkirk. He was named man of the match against Rangers in the Scottish League Cup semi-final on November 2, having controversially avoided being sent off for a late challenge on Rangers goalkeeper Jack Butland.

Trusty scored his second Celtic goal in a 2–2 draw with Bologna in the Europa League on January 22, 2026. He also made a series of crucial blocks and tackles to help the Bhoys gain a crucial point, winning man of the match in the process. Three days later, however, he was sent off against Hearts for a professional foul on Pierre Landry Kaboré. He was sent off again in a 2-1 defeat against Hibernian on February 22, 2026.

Trusty was at the center of a highly controversial incident at the end of Celtic's league tie against Motherwell at Fir Park on May 13, 2026. In the fifth and final minute of injury time, with the score at 2-2, he challenged Motherwell midfielder Sam Nicholson for the ball in the Motherwell penalty box. After Nicholson appeared to handle the ball away, Trusty went down holding the side of his face and, though referee John Beaton initially waved play on, he was eventually asked to go and look at the VAR. Upon inspection, Beaton decided that Nicholson's hand had made contact with the ball during the header and gave a penalty to Celtic. The penalty was converted by Kelechi Iheanacho to win the game 3-2, meaning that Celtic remained one point behind Hearts in a dramatic title race. Celtic went on to win the league against Hearts at Celtic Park on the final day, giving Trusty his second consecutive Scottish Premiership title.

== International career ==
Trusty has represented the United States at the under-17 level, playing in the 2015 FIFA U-17 World Cup in Chile. He started the opening match, against Nigeria, but was given a red card near the end of the 2–0 defeat for a poor challenge on goalscorer Victor Osimhen. He missed the second group game through suspension, and was an unused substitute for the third, a 4–1 loss to Chile that confirmed the United States' elimination from the tournament. He was a member of Tab Ramos' under-20 squad for the FIFA U-20 World Cup, replacing the injured Marlon Fossey. He scored one goal during the tournament, the fifth in a 6–0 victory over New Zealand on June 1.

On December 20, 2018, Trusty, alongside then teammate Mark McKenzie, received his first call-up to the senior United States squad for their January 2019 camp. Trusty was added to the roster for the United States' January 2022 training camp in Phoenix. Trusty made his senior debut on March 24, 2023, starting the CONCACAF Nations League A group phase match against Grenada. Partnering McKenzie in central defense, Trusty played the whole game, and provided the assist for Weston McKennie's second goal of the 7–1 win. Trusty was called up for the finals of the 2024–25 CONCACAF Nations League, but had to withdraw after suffering an injury. On November 19, he started the USA's 5–1 thrashing of Uruguay at the Raymond James Stadium and assisted Alex Freeman's second goal.

On May 26, 2026, Trusty was selected in the 26-man squad for the 2026 FIFA World Cup. Trusty made his World Cup debut in a 2–0 group stage victory against Australia on June 19, 2026 at Lumen Field in Seattle, helping the United States secure its spot in the Round of 32. He earned his first World Cup start against Türkiye on June 25, 2026 at SoFi Stadium in Inglewood, in which he also scored his first international goal.

== Personal life ==
In November 2024, Trusty and his wife, Emily Berardino, announced that they were expecting their first child. The couple were married in Glasgow in April 2025. Their daughter arrived later that year.

== Career statistics ==
=== Club ===
As of match played March 8, 2026

Appearances and goals by club, season and competition
Club	Season	League			National cup (Note: Includes U.S. Open Cup, FA Cup, Scottish Cup)		League cup (Note: Includes EFL Cup, Scottish League Cup)		Continental		Other		Total	
Club	Season	Division	Apps	Goals	Apps	Goals	Apps	Goals	Apps	Goals	Apps	Goals	Apps	Goals
Bethlehem Steel	2016	USL	19	0	—		—		—		—		19	0
Bethlehem Steel	2017	USL	25	0	—		—		—		—		25	0
Bethlehem Steel	Total		44	0	—		—		—		—		44	0
Philadelphia Union	2018	MLS	34	1	5	0	—		—		1 (Note: Appearance in MLS Cup Playoffs)	0	40	1
Philadelphia Union	2019	MLS	22	1	0	0	—		—		—		22	1
Philadelphia Union	Total		56	2	5	0	—		—		1	0	62	2
Colorado Rapids	2020	MLS	8	0	—		—		—		0	0	8	0
Colorado Rapids	2021	MLS	33	1	—		—		—		1	0	34	1
Colorado Rapids	Total		41	1	—		—		—		1	0	42	1
Arsenal	2022–23	Premier League	0	0	—		—		—		—		0	0
Colorado Rapids (loan)	2022	MLS	16	0	1	0	—		2 (Note: Appearances in CONCACAF Champions League)	0	—		19	0
Birmingham City (loan)	2022–23	Championship	44	4	3	0	1	0	—		—		48	4
Sheffield United	2023–24	Premier League	32	0	1	0	1	0	—		—		34	0
Sheffield United	2024–25	Championship	1	0	—		2	1	—		—		3	1
Sheffield United	Total		33	0	1	0	3	1	—		—		37	1
Celtic	2024–25	Scottish Premiership	22	1	2	0	3	0	10 (Note: Appearances in UEFA Champions League)	0	—		37	1
Celtic	2025–26	Scottish Premiership	19	0	2	0	3	0	8 (Note: One appearance in UEFA Champions League, seven appearances and two goals in UEFA Europa League)	2	—		32	2
Celtic	2026–27	Scottish Premiership	0	0	0	0	0	0	0	0	—		0	0
Celtic	Total		41	1	4	0	6	0	18	2	—		69	3
Career total			275	8	14	0	10	1	20	2	2	0	321	11

=== International ===
As of match played November 17, 2026

Appearances and goals by national team and year
National team	Year	Apps	Goals
United States	2023	2	0
United States	2024	2	0
United States	2025	1	0
United States	2026	11	2
Total		16	2

United States score listed first, score column indicates score after each Trusty goal.

List of international goals scored by Auston Trusty
No.	Date	Venue	Cap	Opponent	Score	Result	Competition
1	June 25, 2026	SoFi Stadium, Inglewood, United States	10	Turkey	1–0	2–3	2026 FIFA World Cup
2	November 14, 2026	Nu Stadium, Miami, United States	15	Haiti	1–0	6–0	2026–27 CONCACAF Nations League A

== Honors ==
Philadelphia Union

- U.S. Open Cup runner-up: 2018

Celtic

- Scottish Premiership: 2024–25, 2025–26
- Scottish Cup: 2025–26
- Scottish League Cup: 2024–25

United States U20

- CONCACAF Under-20 Championship: 2017

United States

- CONCACAF Nations League: 2022–23

Individual

- Birmingham City Player of the Season: 2022–23
