= 2022 Desert Showcase =

Tournament details
- Host country: United States
- Dates: January 26–February 26
- Teams: 10 (5 each from MLS and USL)

Tournament statistics
- Matches played: 6
- Goals scored: 18 (3 per match)

The 2022 Desert Showcase was the twelfth edition of the Desert Showcase, a preseason exhibition soccer tournament among Major League Soccer (MLS) and United Soccer League (USL) teams. The MLS portion was held from January 26 to February 5, 2022 and the USL portion will take place from February 16 to 26, 2022, at the Kino Sports Complex in Tucson.

== Teams ==
The following teams participated in the tournament

=== Major League Soccer ===
- Seattle Sounders FC
- Portland Timbers
- Sporting Kansas City
- Colorado Rapids
- Houston Dynamo FC

Real Salt Lake was invited but the club withdrew from the event due to scheduling conflicts and technical considerations. Real Salt Lake was replaced with Sounders rival Portland Timbers for this match.

=== USL Championship ===
- Louisville City FC
- El Paso Locomotive FC
- Oakland Roots SC
- FC Tulsa

=== USL League One ===
- FC Tucson

== Matches ==
=== Major League Soccer ===
January 26
7:00 pm MST (UTC−7)

Portland Timbers	0–0	Seattle Sounders FC
	POR Report; SEA Report

Kino Sports Complex, Tucson, Arizona
Attendance: 2,000+
January 29
4:00 pm MST (UTC−7)

Sporting Kansas City	0–0	Colorado Rapids
	SKC Report; COL Report

Kino Sports Complex, Tucson, Arizona
February 5
4:00 pm MST (UTC−7)

Houston Dynamo FC	3–2	Colorado Rapids
Ferreira 33'; Gitau 82'; Carrasquilla 90+3'	HOU Report; COL Report	Rubio 6'; Toure 87'

Kino Sports Complex, Tucson, Arizona

=== USL Championship ===
February 16
2:00 pm MST (UTC−7)

Louisville City FC	5–2	El Paso Locomotive FC
Lancaster 24', 39'; Ownby 64'; Gonzalez 65', 72'	LOU Report	Hinds ?'; ? ?'

Kino Sports Complex, Tucson, Arizona
February 20
10:00 am MST (UTC−7)

Oakland Roots SC	3–2	FC Tulsa

Kino Sports Complex, Tucson, Arizona
February 26
TBD MST (UTC−7)

FC Tucson	0–1	Oakland Roots SC
	TUC Report	Dennis 20'

Kino Sports Complex, Tucson, Arizona
