= William Yarbrough =

American soccer player (born 1989)

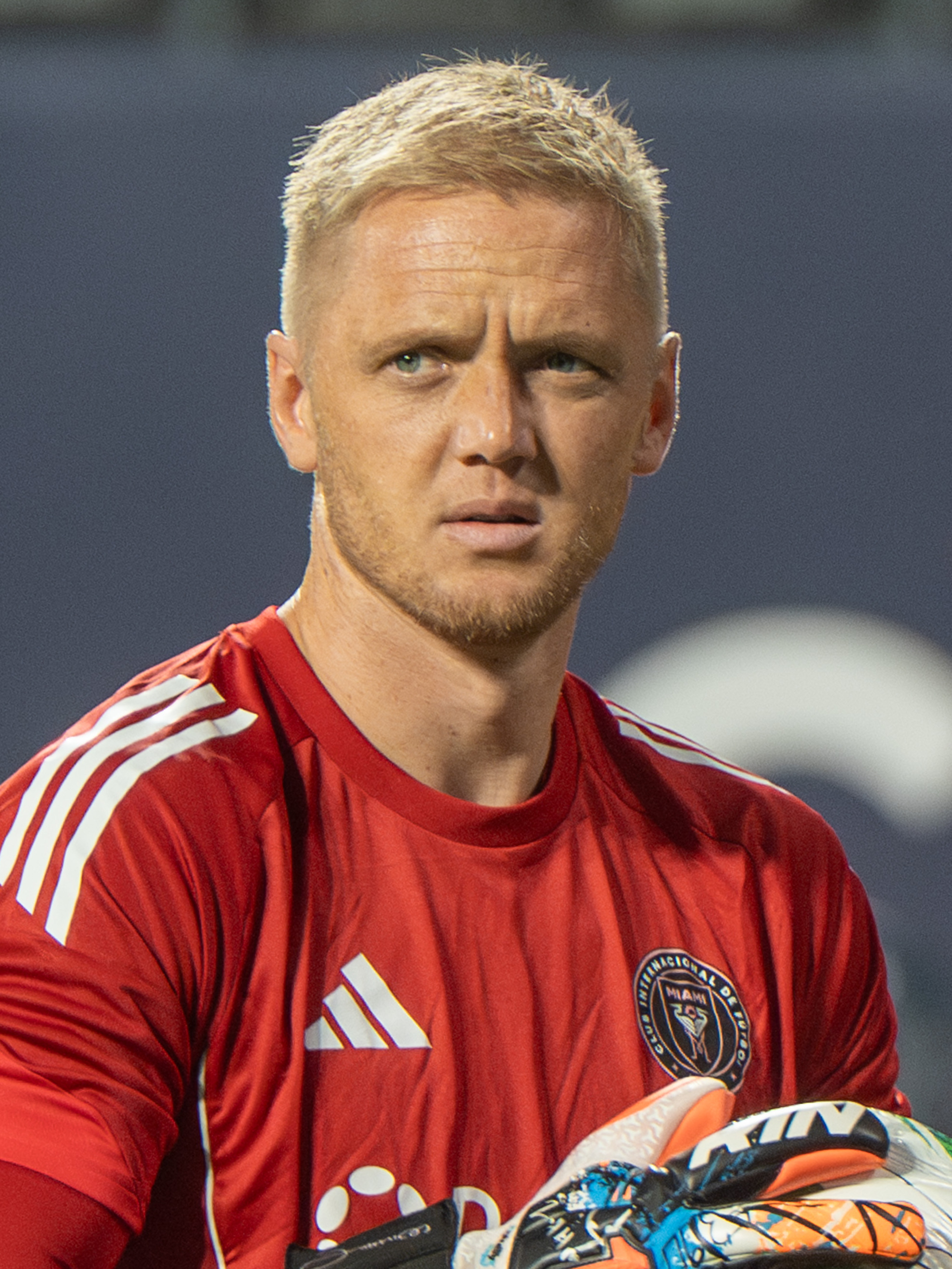
- Yarbrough with Inter Miami in 2025

Personal information
- Full name: William Paul Yarbrough Story
- Date of birth: March 20, 1989 (age 37)
- Place of birth: Aguascalientes, Mexico
- Height: 1.88 m (6 ft 2 in)
- Position: Goalkeeper

Team information
- Current team: Toronto FC
- Number: 23

Youth career
- 1995–2004: Gallos de Aguascalientes
- 2005–2010: Pachuca

Senior career*
Years	Team	Apps	(Gls)
2010–2013	Pachuca	0	(0)
2010–2011	→ Tampico Madero (loan)	28	(0)
2011	→ Titanes Tulancingo (loan)	13	(0)
2012–2013	→ León (loan)	9	(0)
2013–2020	León	161	(0)
2020	→ Colorado Rapids (loan)	14	(0)
2021–2023	Colorado Rapids	88	(0)
2022	→ Colorado Rapids 2 (loan)	1	(0)
2024	San Jose Earthquakes	19	(0)
2025	Inter Miami	0	(0)
2026–	Toronto FC	2	(0)

International career
2007	Mexico U20		
2015–2016	United States	3	(0)
- * Club domestic league appearances and goals as of November 7, 2026

William Paul Yarbrough Story (born March 20, 1989) is a professional soccer player who plays as a goalkeeper for Major League Soccer club Toronto FC. Born in Mexico, he represented the United States national team.

== Personal life ==
Yarbrough was born and raised in Aguascalientes, Mexico, to American parents who emigrated from Texas in the 1980s. His parents are missionaries Lee Yarbrough and Stacey Story, who decided to live in Mexico, after having their honeymoon there. He is a devout Christian.

== Club career ==
=== Pachuca ===
Yarbrough started his career at six years old with Gallos de Aguascalientes. In 2005, he was invited for a trial with the U17 team of C.F. Pachuca and later signed with them at the age of sixteen. He played until April 2010 for the youth squad of Pachuca and was loaned out to his first senior team, Jaibos Tampico Madero. He was on loan until July 2011, participating in 38 matches during the Liga Premier de México 2010–2011 season. In summer 2011, he joined Titanes Tulancingo on another loan.

=== León ===
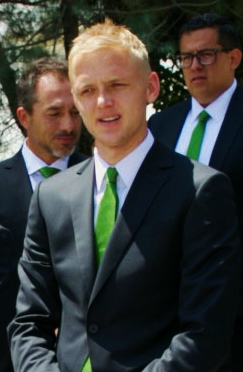
Yarbrough in 2014

During the 2012–2013 season, he was loaned out to Club León from Pachuca, and did not play a league match during the 2012 Apertura tournament. Yarbrough played his only match in the first round of the Copa MX Apertura against Dorados de Sinaloa. Yarbrough was the starting goalkeeper for León until the end of the 2013 Clausura tournament, playing 8 matches.

Yarbrough eventually joined León on a permanent basis, becoming their starting goalkeeper for most matches of both the Apertura and Clausura over the following seasons, and helped León to two Liga MX titles. In the 2015 Apertura and 2016 Clausura, Yarbrough led León to a third-place finish, while leading all Liga MX goalkeepers in both saves and clean sheets.

In May 2018, León acquired Rodolfo Cota. Cota took over as the starting goalkeeper. Yarbrough started four matches late in 2018, and started two matches in September 2019.

On March 6, 2020, Yarbrough was loaned to MLS side Colorado Rapids for one year.

=== Colorado Rapids ===
Yarbrough made his Rapids debut against Sporting Kansas City at the MLS is Back Tournament on July 17, 2020. Yarbrough earned his first Rapids victory and clean sheet in a 5–0 win over Real Salt Lake to reclaim the Rocky Mountain Cup. Yarbrough ended the season with a 6-4-4 (W-L-D) record and four clean sheets. Yarbrough also started Colorado's first-round playoff loss at Minnesota United FC.

On February 2, 2021, Yarbrough moved permanently to the Colorado Rapids on a 3-year deal. In week two of the 2023 season, Yarbrough was named to the league's Team of the Matchday after registering eleven saves in a scoreless draw against Sporting Kansas City, becoming the first player in club history to do so.

He would leave the club at the end of 2023.

=== San Jose Earthquakes ===
On 16 January 2024, Yarbrough would then sign for San Jose Earthquakes for the 2024 season. On 23 March, he made his debut for the club in a 3–2 win against Seattle. He would leave the club and become a free agent.

=== Inter Miami ===
On 21 May 2025, Yarbrough signed for Inter Miami as a free agent. He would play zero games for the club as their other goalkeeper Oscar Ustari did play, although he would get injured and replaced by Rocco Ríos Novo. Yarbrough then left the club when his contract expired.

=== Toronto FC ===
On 16 January 2026, Yarbrough signed for Toronto FC on a one-year contract.

== International career ==
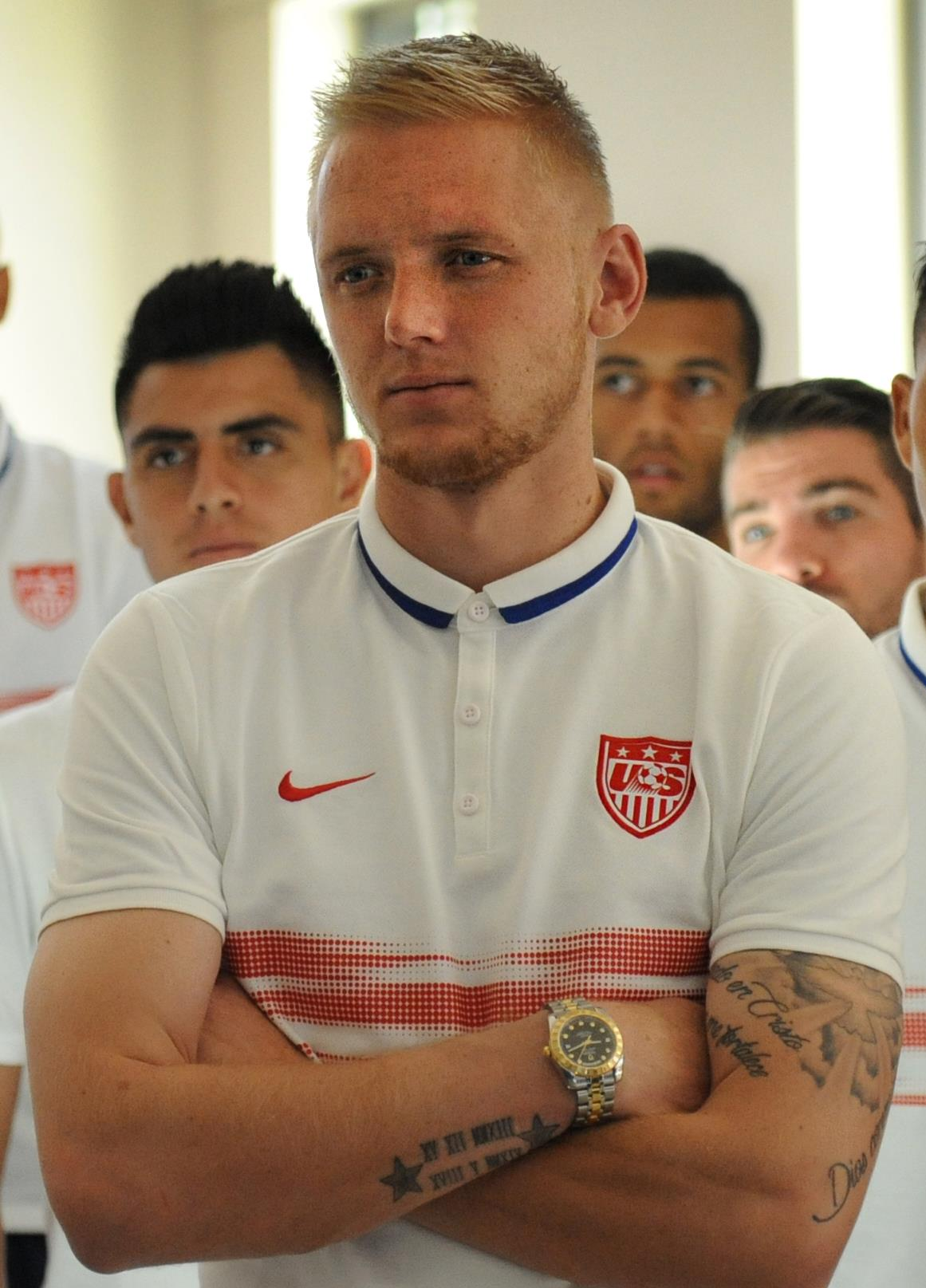
Yarbrough with the United States in 2015

In 2007, Yarbrough received a call up to the Mexico national under-20 team. In an interview, Yarbrough said though he had been called up for the Mexico under-20s, he had no preference between the two national teams as he is eligible to represent both. Despite accepting a call-up from the Mexican Federation in 2007, he ended up accepting an offer to the U.S. national team.

Yarbrough earned his first call-up to the United States national team in March 2015. He appeared in the bench when the United States played against Denmark on March 25, 2015. Yarbrough substituted Nick Rimando in the beginning of the second half against Switzerland on March 31 to earn his first cap. Yarbrough conceded one goal against Switzerland; the game ended in a 1–1 draw. In his second appearance for the United States, Yarbrough was subbed in for Rimando at halftime during a friendly against Mexico on April 15, 2015. He had two saves in the 2–0 victory for the U.S.

Yarbrough made his 3rd appearance for the United States team in a friendly match against New Zealand which ended in a 1–1 draw.

== Honors ==
Titanes Tulancingo

- Liga Premier Apertura: 2011

León

- Liga MX: Apertura 2013, Clausura 2014
- Liga MX Torneo Guardianes: 2020
- Liga de Ascenso: Clausura 2012
- Campeón de Ascenso: 2012

Inter Miami

- MLS Cup: 2025
- Leagues Cup runner-up: 2025

Individual

- Colorado Rapids Most Clean Sheets: 2020, 2021, 2022, 2023
- MLS Team of the Week: Week 3 2021, Week 8 2022
- MLS Most Clean Sheets: 2021
- MLS Goalkeeper of the Year Award: 2021 (4th place)
- MLS Team of the Matchday: Matchday 2 2023, Matchday 7 2024
