= Dantouma Toure =

American soccer player

Personal information
- Full name: Dantouma Toure
- Date of birth: June 12, 2004 (age 22)
- Place of birth: Conakry, Guinea
- Height: 5 ft 9 in (1.75 m)
- Position: Winger

Youth career
- 2016–2018: PDA
- 2018–2020: New York Red Bulls

Senior career*
Years	Team	Apps	(Gls)
2020	New York Red Bulls II	13	(3)
2021–2023	Colorado Rapids	6	(1)
2021	→ Colorado Springs Switchbacks (loan)	22	(3)
2022	Colorado Rapids 2	15	(8)
2024	Hartford Athletic	3	(0)

International career^{‡}
2018	United States U16	3	(0)
2020	United States U17	3	(0)
- * Club domestic league appearances and goals as of October 31, 2024 ‡ National team caps and goals as of July 18, 2020

Dantouma "Yaya" Toure (born June 12, 2004) is a soccer player who plays as a winger. Born in Guinea, he has represented the United States at youth level.

A resident of Trenton, New Jersey, Toure played prep soccer at Trenton Central High School.

== Club career ==
=== Youth ===
Toure played as a member of the Players Development Academy (PDA) before moving to New York Red Bulls.

During the 2020 USL Championship season Toure appeared for New York Red Bulls II. He made his debut as a 77th-minute substitute during a 1–0 loss to Hartford Athletic on July 17, 2020.

=== Colorado Rapids ===
On March 4, 2021, Toure joined Major League Soccer club Colorado Rapids, with the Rapids acquiring his homegrown rights from the New York Red Bulls via a trade. On April 20, 2023, Toure was waived by Colorado.

==== Colorado Springs Switchbacks (loan) ====
On May 13, 2021, Toure joined USL Championship side Colorado Springs Switchbacks FC on loan.

==== Hartford Athletic (loan) ====
On June 13, 2024, Toure joined USL Championship side Hartford Athletic on loan for the remainder of the 2024 season from the MLS Pool.

== International career ==
Toure is eligible for both Guinea and the United States, and has represented the United States at under-16 and under-17 level.
