= List of awards and honours received by Vladimir Putin =

Vladimir Putin is a Russian politician and former intelligence officer who has been serving as the president of Russia since 2012, having previously served between 2000 and 2008. He was the prime minister of Russia from 1999 to 2000 and again from 2008 to 2012. He has received a number of awards and honours from within Russia, from academic institutions, and from foreign politicians and countries.

Note: Shows awards and honours that were revoked in response to the 2022 Russian invasion of Ukraine.

== State honours ==
Date	Country	Decoration	Presenter	Notes
7 March 2001	Vietnam	Order of Ho Chi Minh	President Trần Đức Lương	Vietnam's second-highest distinction
8 January 2004	Kazakhstan	Order of the Golden Eagle	President Nursultan Nazarbayev	Kazakhstan's highest distinction
22 September 2006	France	Légion d'honneur, Grand-Croix	President Jacques Chirac	Grand-Croix (Grand Cross) rank is the highest French decoration
12 February 2007	Saudi Arabia	Order of Abdulaziz al Saud	King Abdullah	Saudi Arabia's highest civilian award
10 September 2007	United Arab Emirates	Order of Zayed	Sheikh Khalifa	UAE's highest civil decoration
6 October 2007	Tajikistan	Order of Ismoili Somoni	President Emomali Rahmon	Tajikistan's highest distinction
20 February 2008	Uzbekistan	Order of Outstanding Merit	President Islam Karimov	
13 May 2009	Mongolia	Order of the Precious Wand	President Nambaryn Enkhbayar	
2 April 2010	Venezuela	Order of the Liberator	President Hugo Chávez	Venezuela's highest distinction
26 June 2012	Palestine	Order of the State of Palestine	President Mahmoud Abbas	Palestine's highest distinction
14 March 2013	Belarus	Order of the Friendship of Peoples	President Alexander Lukashenko	
4 October 2013	Monaco	Order of Saint-Charles	Prince Albert	Monaco's highest decoration
11 July 2014	Cuba	Order of José Martí	President of the State Council & First Secretary of the Communist Party Raúl Castro	Cuba's highest decoration
16 October 2014	Serbia	Order of the Republic of Serbia	President Tomislav Nikolić	Grand Collar, Serbia's highest award
28 September 2017	Guinea	Grand Cross of the National Order of Merit	President Alpha Condé	
1 October 2017	Turkmenistan	Order "For contribution to the development of cooperation"	President Gurbanguly Berdimuhamedow	
24 October 2017	Cyprus	Grand Collar of the Order of Makarios III	President Nicos Anastasiades	
22 November 2017	Kyrgyzstan	Order of Manas	President Almazbek Atambayev	
8 June 2018	China	Order of Friendship	President & General Secretary of the Communist Party Xi Jinping	People's Republic of China's highest order of honour
23 August 2018	South Ossetia	Order of Uatsamonga	President Anatoly Bibilov	Highest award of South Ossetia
24 August 2018	Abkhazia	Order of Honour and Glory, First Class	President Raul Khajimba	Highest award of Abkhazia
4 April 2019	Angola	Order of Agostinho Neto	President João Lourenço	
27 May 2019	Kazakhstan	Order of Nazarbayev	Elbasy Nursultan Nazarbayev	
6 October 2022	Uzbekistan	Order of Highest Friendship	President Shavkat Mirziyoyev	
8 January 2023	Republika Srpska	Order of the Republika Srpska on necklace	President Milorad Dodik	Republika of Srpska's highest medal of honor, awarded for President Putin's “patriotic concern and love” for the Serb-controlled half of Bosnia
18 June 2024	North Korea	Order of Kim Il Sung	President of the State Affairs & General Secretary of the Worker's Party Kim Jong Un	Does not comply with the laws of the DPRK

== Honorary doctorates ==
Date	University/ Institute	Country	Notes
2000	Turkmen State University	Turkmenistan	
2000	Jawaharlal Nehru University	India	
2001	Baku Slavic University	Azerbaijan	
2001	Yerevan State University	Armenia	
~~2001~~	~~Athens University~~	~~Greece~~	Revoked in 2022
~~2009~~	~~Veliko Tarnovo University~~	~~Bulgaria~~	Revoked in 2022
2010	Yong In University	South Korea	
2011	University of Belgrade	Serbia	
~~2018~~	~~University of Peloponnese~~	~~Greece~~	Revoked in 2022
2019	Tsinghua University	China	

== Other awards ==
Year	Award	Notes
~~2001~~	~~Olympic Order~~	Revoked in 2022
20 February 2006	Order of Sheikh ul-Islam	A Muslim order, awarded for his role in interfaith dialogue between Muslims and Christians in the region.
2008	The honorary citizenship of Novi Sad	The second-most populous city in Serbia.
24 March 2011	Order of Saint Sava	Serbian Orthodox Church's highest distinction.
15 November 2011	Confucius Peace Prize	The China International Peace Research Centre awarded the Confucius Peace Prize to Putin, citing as reason Putin's opposition to NATO's Libya bombing in 2011 while also paying tribute to his decision to go to war in Chechnya in 1999. According to the committee, Putin's "Iron hand and toughness revealed in this war impressed the Russians a lot, and he was regarded to be capable of bringing safety and stability to Russia".
~~November 2013~~	~~Honorary 9th Dan Black Belt - World Taekwondo~~	Revoked in 2022

== Recognition ==
Year	Award/Recognition	Description
19 December 2007	Time: Person of the Year	"His final year as Russia's president has been his most successful yet. At home, he secured his political future. Abroad, he expanded his outsize—if not always benign—influence on global affairs."
24 December 2007	Expert: Person of the Year	A Russian business-oriented weekly magazine named Putin as its Person of the Year.
5 October 2008	Vladimir Putin Avenue	The central street of Grozny, the capital of Russia's Republic of Chechnya, was renamed from the Victory Avenue to the Vladimir Putin Avenue, as ordered by the Chechen president Ramzan Kadyrov.
17 February 2011	Vladimir Putin Peak	The parliament of Kyrgyzstan named a peak in Tian Shan mountains Vladimir Putin Peak.
2020	Ig Nobel Prize in medical information	Satirical award that was shared with Jair Bolsonaro, Boris Johnson, Narendra Modi, Andrés Manuel López Obrador, Alexander Lukashenko, Donald Trump, Recep Tayyip Erdoğan, and Gurbanguly Berdimuhamedow for using the COVID-19 pandemic to teach the world that politicians can have a more immediate effect on life and death than scientists and doctors can.
