= 2025 Colorado Rapids season =

Colorado Rapids
2025 season
- Owner: Stan Kroenke
- Head coach: Chris Armas
- Major League Soccer: Conference: 11th Overall: 21st
- Leagues Cup: League phase
- CONCACAF Champions Cup: Round one
- Top goalscorer: League: Rafael Navarro (12); All: Rafael Navarro (15)
- Average home league attendance: 15,890
Home colors	Away colors	Third colors

The 2025 Colorado Rapids season was the 30th season of the club's existence and the 30th season in Major League Soccer (MLS), and the top tier of American soccer pyramid. The Rapids had revealed a logo commemorating the club's anniversary.

== Management team ==
Front office
Owner	Stan Kroenke
President	Jim Martin
Executive VP / General Manager	Pádraig Smith
Assistant GM	Fran Taylor
Director, Soccer Operations and Compliance	Courtney Intara
Snr. Director, Soccer Development / USL GM	Brian Crookham
Senior Director, Scouting and Recruitment	Mitch Murray
Manager, Scouting	Chris Zitterbart
Data Analyst	Matt Pfeffer
Scouting Video Analyst	Brennan Stieneker
Coaching staff
Head coach	Chris Armas
Assistant coach	Chris Little
Assistant coach	Neil Emblen
Assistant coach	Wolde Harris
Assistant coach / Goalkeeper coach	Chris Sharpe
Assistant coach	Ian Sarachan
Team Analyst	Jase Kim
Colorado Rapids Academy
Academy administrator	Boyd Kirk
Academy head coaches	Marcelo Balboa; Erik Bushey; Chris Cartlidge; Andrew Kewley; Antti Ronkanen

Last updated: December 24,

== Roster ==
As of February 16, 2025

Note: Flags indicate national team as defined under FIFA eligibility rules; some limited exceptions apply. Players may hold more than one non-FIFA nationality.

No.	Pos.	Nation	Player
1	GK	USA	Zack Steffen
2	DF	USA	Keegan Rosenberry
3	DF	USA	Sam Vines
4	DF	USA	Reggie Cannon
5	DF	DEN	Andreas Maxsø
6	DF	NGA	Chidozie Awaziem
8	MF	USA	Oliver Larraz
9	FW	BRA	Rafael Navarro
10	MF	USA	Djordje Mihailovic
11	MF	USA	Omir Fernandez
12	MF	USA	Josh Atencio
13	MF	TRI	Wayne Frederick
14	FW	ENG	Calvin Harris
16	FW	USA	Alex Harris

No.	Pos.	Nation	Player
18	MF	USA	Sam Bassett
19	DF	USA	Ian Murphy
20	MF	IRL	Connor Ronan
21	MF	USA	Ted Ku-DiPietro
23	MF	USA	Cole Bassett
27	FW	CAN	Kimani Stewart-Baynes
31	GK	USA	Adam Beaudry
34	DF	USA	Michael Edwards
45	FW	CMR	Daouda Amadou
77	FW	USA	Darren Yapi
91	FW	FRA	Kévin Cabral
99	DF	USA	Jackson Travis
—	MF	GHA	Ali Fadal

== Transfers ==
=== In ===
Νο.	Pos.	Nat.	Name	Age	Moving from	Type	Transfer window	Transfer fee	Ref.

=== Out ===
Νο.	Pos.	Nat.	Name	Age	Moving to	Type	Transfer window	Transfer fee	Ref.

== Competitions ==
Win Draw Loss

All matches are in Mountain Time.

=== Preseason ===
January 19 Closed-Door Friendly	Celaya	2–2	Colorado Rapids	Apaseo el Grande, Mexico
10:00 a.m. MST	10'; 87'		Copeland 64'; S. Bassett 69'	Stadium: FC Total

January 26 Closed-Door Friendly	Querétaro	1–1	Colorado Rapids	Querétaro, Mexico
9:30 a.m. MST	101'		Navarro 23'	Stadium: Estadio Corregidora
Note: Played in four 30-minute quarters.

January 31 Closed-Door Friendly	Atlético La Paz	0–3	Colorado Rapids	Querétaro, Mexico
10:00 a.m. MST			Navarro 13', 15'; Mihailovic 21'	Stadium: La Loma Altitude Training
Note: Additional 30-minute period played following two 45-minute halves.

February 7 Closed-Door Friendly	D.C. United	1–1	Colorado Rapids	Palm Beach Gardens, Florida
11:00 a.m. MST	77'		Stewart-Baynes 70'	Stadium: The Gardens North County District Park

February 11 Closed-Door Friendly	Toronto FC	0–1	Colorado Rapids	Palm Beach Gardens, Florida
9:00 a.m. MST		Report	Navarro 84'	Stadium: The Gardens North County District Park
Note: Additional 30-minute period played following two 45-minute halves.

=== Major League Soccer (MLS) ===
==== Standings ====
MLS Western Conference table (2025)
Pos	Team	Pld	W	L	T	GF	GA	GD	Pts	Qualification
9	Real Salt Lake	34	12	17	5	38	49	−11	41	Qualification for the wild-card round
10	San Jose Earthquakes	34	11	15	8	60	63	−3	41	
11	Colorado Rapids	34	11	15	8	44	56	−12	41	
12	Houston Dynamo FC	34	9	15	10	43	56	−13	37	
13	St. Louis City SC	34	8	18	8	44	58	−14	32	

Source: MLS
Rules for classification: 1) points; 2) total wins; 3) total goal differential; 4) total goals scored; 5) fewer disciplinary points; 6) away goal differential; 7) away goals scored; 8) home goals differential; 9) home goals scored; 10) coin toss (2 clubs tied) or drawing of lots (≥3 clubs tied)

Overall MLS standings table (2025)
Pos	Team	Pld	W	L	T	GF	GA	GD	Pts
19	Real Salt Lake	34	12	17	5	38	49	−11	41
20	San Jose Earthquakes	34	11	15	8	60	63	−3	41
21	Colorado Rapids	34	11	15	8	44	56	−12	41
22	Houston Dynamo FC	34	9	15	10	43	56	−13	37
23	New England Revolution	34	9	16	9	44	51	−7	36

Source: MLS
Rules for classification: 1) points; 2) total wins; 3) total goal differential; 4) total goals scored; 5) fewer disciplinary points; 6) away goal differential; 7) away goals scored; 8) home goals differential; 9) home goals scored; 10) coin toss (2 clubs tied) or drawing of lots (≥3 clubs tied)

== Overview ==
Competition	First match	Last match	Starting round	Final position	Record							
Competition	First match	Last match	Starting round	Final position	Pld	W	D	L	GF	GA	GD	Win %
Major League Soccer	February 22, 2025	October 18, 2025	Matchday 1	TBD	27	10	6	11	36	41	−5	37.04
MLS Cup Playoffs	TBD	TBD	TBD	TBD	0	0	0	0	0	0	+0	—
Leagues Cup	July 31st, 2025	August 7th, 2025	League phase	League phase	3	1	1	1	5	5	+0	33.33
CONCACAF Champions Cup	February 18th, 2025	February 25th, 2025	Round One	Round One	2	1	0	1	2	2	+0	50.00
Total					32	12	7	13	43	48	−5	37.50

Source: Competitions

== Results summary ==
Overall								Home						Away					
Pld	Pts	W	L	T	GF	GA	GD	W	L	T	GF	GA	GD	W	L	T	GF	GA	GD
34	41	11	15	8	45	55	−10	8	5	4	25	21	+4	3	10	4	20	34	−14

Last updated: October 18, 2025
Source: MLS Results
Pld = Matches played; Pts = Points; W = Matches won; T = Matches tied; L = Matches lost; GF = Goals for; GA = Goals against; GD = Goal difference

== Results by round ==
Round	1	2	3	4	5	6	7	8	9	10	11	12	13	14	15	16	17	18	19	20	21	22	23	24	25	26	27	28	29	30	31	32	33	34
Stadium	A	H	A	A	H	H	A	H	A	H	A	H	A	H	H	A	H	H	H	A	H	A	H	A	A	A	H	A	A	H	A	H	A	H
Result	D	D	W	W	L	W	L	W	D	D	L	L	L	W	W	L	L	L	W	D	L	L	W	D	L	W	W	L	L	W	L	D	L	D
Points	1	2	5	8	8	11	11	14	15	16	16	16	16	19	22	22	22	22	25	26	26	26	29	30	30	33	36	36	36	39	39	40	40	41
Position (West)	8	10	7	4	7	5	7	5	5	5	8	9	9	7	7	8	9	9	9	8	9	9	7	7	9	8	7	7	8	8	8	8	10	11

Source: Match reports
A = Away; H = Home; N = Neutral; W = Win; D = Draw; L = Loss; = Conference leader; = Playoffs berth; = Wild card berth

== Match results ==
Win Draw Loss Void Postponed

February 22, 2025 1	St. Louis City SC	0–0	Colorado Rapids	St. Louis, Missouri
6:30 p.m. MST	Watts (yellow card) 80'	Report	Frederick (yellow card) 80'	Stadium: Energizer Park; Attendance: 22,423; Referee: Jon Freemon

March 1, 2025 2	Colorado Rapids	3–3	FC Dallas	Commerce City, Colorado
7:30 p.m. MST	Rosenberry 6'; Navarro 39', 72'; C. Bassett (yellow card) 45+3'	Report	Pedrinho 43'; Acosta 45'; Musa 68'; Julio (yellow card) 76'	Stadium: Dick's Sporting Goods Park; Attendance: 15,410; Referee: Lorenzo Hernandez

March 8, 2025 3	Austin FC	0–1	Colorado Rapids	Austin, Texas
6:30 p.m. MST	Pereira (yellow card) 90+1'; Svatok (yellow card) 90+12'	Report	Navarro 18'; Steffen (yellow card) 83'; Mihailovic (yellow card) 89'	Stadium: Q2 Stadium; Attendance: 20,738; Referee: Marcos de Oliveira

March 15, 2025 4	San Jose Earthquakes	1–2	Colorado Rapids	San Jose, California
8:30 p.m. MDT	Arango 45+1', (yellow card) 81'	Report	C. Bassett 38'; Cannon (yellow card) 57'; Harris 71'; Steffen (yellow card) 90+1'	Stadium: PayPal Park; Attendance: 15,302; Referee: Alexis Da Silva

March 22, 2025 5	Colorado Rapids	0−3	Portland Timbers	Commerce City, Colorado
7:30 p.m. MDT		Report	Atencio 45+2' (o.g.); Antony 48'; Kelsy 75'	Stadium: Dick's Sporting Goods Park; Attendance: 15,131; Referee: Jair Marrufo

March 29, 2025 6	Colorado Rapids	2–0	Charlotte FC	Commerce City, Colorado
2:30 p.m. MDT	Awaziem (yellow card) 10'; Mihailovic 78', 81' (pen.)	Report	Zaha (yellow card) 54'; Malanda (yellow card) 80'	Stadium: Dick's Sporting Goods Park; Attendance: 15,211; Referee: Allen Chapman

April 5, 2025 7	Vancouver Whitecaps FC	2–0	Colorado Rapids	Vancouver, British Columbia
7:30 p.m. MDT	White 19'; Sabbi 38'; Cubas (yellow card) 45+1'; Priso (yellow card) 79'	Report	Cabral (yellow card) 53'; Larraz (yellow card) 57'; C. Bassett (yellow card) 85'; Awaziem (yellow card) 90'	Stadium: BC Place; Attendance: 17,993; Referee: Katja Koroleva

April 12, 2025 8	Colorado Rapids	3–2	San Diego FC	Commerce City, Colorado
7:30 p.m. MDT	Mihailovic 37' (pen.); Yapi 53'; Navarro 60'; Awaziem (yellow card) 90'	Report	de la Torre 50'; Ángel 89'	Stadium: Dick's Sporting Goods Park; Attendance: 15,694; Referee: Sergii Boiko

April 19, 2025 9	Houston Dynamo FC	2–2	Colorado Rapids	Houston, Texas
6:30 p.m. MDT	Bassi 42'; Lingr 90+6', (yellow card) 90+7'	Report	Mihailovic 58' (pen.); Frederick (yellow card) 71'; Navarro 77'	Stadium: Shell Energy Stadium; Attendance: 13,207; Referee: Malik Badawi

April 26, 2025 10	Colorado Rapids	1–1	Seattle Sounders FC	Commerce City, Colorado
7:30 p.m. MDT	Travis (yellow card) 38'; Mihailovic 54'; Larraz (yellow card) 83'	Report	Musovski (yellow card) 20', (goal) 45'; Yeimar (yellow card) 69'	Stadium: Dick's Sporting Goods Park; Attendance: 16,312; Referee: Alexis Da Silva

May 3, 2025 11	D.C. United	2–1	Colorado Rapids	Washington, D.C.
5:30 p.m. MDT	Benteke 45+4'; Kijima 45+7'; Peltola (yellow card) 50'; Tubbs (yellow card) 55'; Servania (yellow card) 63'; Enow (yellow card) 87'	Report	Yapi 43'; Frederick (yellow card) 80'; Cannon (yellow card) 86'	Stadium: Audi Field; Attendance: 17,661; Referee: Jon Freemon

May 10, 2025 12	Colorado Rapids	0–2	San Jose Earthquakes	Commerce City, Colorado
7:30 p.m. MDT	Awaziem (yellow card) 28'; Atencio (yellow card) 38'; Maxsø (yellow card) 62'; Cabral (yellow card) 82'	Report	Bouda (yellow card) 36'; Jones 45+2'; Arango 67'	Stadium: Dick's Sporting Goods Park; Attendance: 15,003; Referee: Elijio Arreguin

May 14, 2025 13	San Diego FC	2–0	Colorado Rapids	San Diego, California
8:30 p.m. MDT	Tverskov (yellow card) 6'; McVey 33'; Dreyer 58', (yellow card) 85'; Kumado (yellow card) 66'	Report	Yapi (yellow card) 25'; Cabral (yellow card) 65'; Ku-Dipietro (yellow card) 78'; Harris (yellow card) 83'	Stadium: Snapdragon Stadium; Attendance: 15,644; Referee: Lorenzo Hernandez

May 17, 2025 14	Colorado Rapids	1–0	Real Salt Lake	Commerce City, Colorado
7:30 p.m. MDT	Atencio (yellow card) 29'; Mihailovic 70'; Yapi (yellow card) 80'; Cannon (yellow card) 90+6'	Report	Ojeda (yellow card) 31'	Stadium: Dick's Sporting Goods Park; Attendance: 15,846; Referee: Pierre-Luc Lauziere

May 24, 2025 15	Colorado Rapids	1–0	St. Louis City SC	Commerce City, Colorado
7:30 p.m. MDT	Yapi 41', (yellow card) 90+3'	Report	Reid (yellow card) 82'; Pompeu (yellow card) 88'	Stadium: Dick's Sporting Goods Park; Attendance: 15,109; Referee: Tori Penso

May 28, 2025 16	Portland Timbers	2–1	Colorado Rapids	Portland, Oregon
8:30 p.m. MDT	Surman (yellow card) 29'; Antony 59'; Kelsy 76'; Moreno (yellow card) 83'	Report	Mihailovic 33'; Frederick (red card) 67'; Cabral (yellow card) 90+7'	Stadium: Providence Park; Attendance: 20,012; Referee: Chris Penso

June 7, 2025 18	Colorado Rapids	2–0	Austin FC	Commerce City, Colorado
7:30 p.m. MDT	Travis (yellow card) 39'; S. Bassett (yellow card) 50'	Report	Desler 6'; Navarro 66' (o.g.); Obrian (yellow card) 90'; Sánchez (yellow card) 90+4'	Stadium: Dick's Sporting Goods Park; Attendance: 15,701; Referee: Allen Chapman

June 14, 2025 19	Colorado Rapids	0–1	Orlando City SC	Commerce City, Colorado
7:30 p.m. MDT	Cannon (yellow card) 66'; S. Basset (yellow card) 68'	Report	Ojeda 24'; Schlegel (yellow card) 32'; Smith (yellow card) 84'; Guske (yellow card) 90+2'	Stadium: Dick's Sporting Goods Park; Attendance: 16,473; Referee: Ramy Touchan

June 25, 2025 20	Colorado Rapids	2−0	LA Galaxy	Commerce City, Colorado
7:30 p.m. MDT (Note: The match between the Colorado Rapids vs LA Galaxy was in a 2+ hour weather delay.)	Mihailovic 24'; Harris 28'; Navarro (yellow card) 88'	Report	Sanabria (yellow card) 16'; Cerrillo (yellow card) 64'; Parente (yellow card) 89'	Stadium: Dick's Sporting Goods Park; Attendance: 14,497; Referee: Sergii Boiko
Note: The game was in a 2+ hour weather delay due to thunder and lightning in the Denver metropolitan area.

June 28, 2025 21	New England Revolution	3–3	Colorado Rapids	Foxborough, Massachusetts
5:30 p.m. MDT	Hughes (yellow card) 7'; Vines 58' (o.g.); Gil (yellow card) 78', (goal) 86' (pen.); Urruti 90+3'	Report	Harris 29'; Navarro 40'; Ku-Dipietro 55'; Maxsø (yellow card) 79'; Cannon (yellow card) 90+4'	Stadium: Gillette Stadium; Attendance: 22,886; Referee: Natalie Simon

July 4, 2025 22	Colorado Rapids	1–2	Sporting Kansas City	Commerce City, Colorado
7:30 p.m. MDT	Navarro 89' (pen.)	Report	Joveljić 4'; Fernández (yellow card) 17'; García (yellow card) 48'; Leibold (yellow card) 52'; Thommy 53'; Bartlett (yellow card) 64'	Stadium: Dick's Sporting Goods Park; Attendance: 17,576; Referee: Filip Dujic

July 9, 2025 17	Los Angeles FC	3–0	Colorado Rapids	Los Angeles, California
8:30 p.m. MDT	Bouanga 42' (pen.); Ordaz 48'; Dilrosun 59'	Report	Travis (red card) 6'	Stadium: BMO Stadium; Attendance: 22,230; Referee: Jair Marrufo
Note: Match moved from May 31 due to Los Angeles FC's participation in the 2025 FIFA Club World Cup playoff match.

July 12, 2025 23	Colorado Rapids	3–0	Vancouver Whitecaps FC	Commerce City, Colorado
7:30 p.m. MDT	Harris 12', (yellow card) 41'; Navarro 30'; Maxsø (yellow card) 51', (goal) 59'	Report	Sabbi (yellow card) 27'	Stadium: Dick's Sporting Goods Park; Attendance: 16,110; Referee: Ricardo Fierro

July 16, 2025 24	Seattle Sounders FC	3–3	Colorado Rapids	Seattle, Washington
7:30 p.m. MDT	Vargas 16'; Rusnák 43', 47'; C. Roldan (yellow card) 72'; Ferreira (yellow card) 72'; Kim (yellow card) 83'; Ragen (yellow card) 83'	Report	Ronan (yellow card) 31'; Mihailovic 50' (pen.); C. Bassett 53' (pen.); Yapi 75', (yellow card) 80'; Maxsø (yellow card) 76'; Awaziem (yellow card) 90+2'; Larraz (yellow card) 90+6'	Stadium: Lumen Field; Attendance: 30,049; Referee: Lorenzo Hernandez

July 26, 2025 25	Philadelphia Union	3–1	Colorado Rapids	Chester, Pennsylvania
5:30 p.m. MDT	Baribo 64', (yellow card) 85'; Uhre 89', 90+5'	Report	Navarro 37'; Mihailovic (yellow card) 60'; Cannon (yellow card) 69'; Steffen (yellow card) 79'	Stadium: Subaru Park; Attendance: 18,057; Referee: Malik Badawi

August 10, 2025 26	Minnesota United FC	1–2	Colorado Rapids	Saint Paul, Minnesota
4:00 p.m. MDT	Markanich (yellow card) 58'; Trapp (yellow card) 70'; Oluwaseyi 73'	Report	Yapi 60', 70'	Stadium: Allianz Field; Attendance: 19,756; Referee: Greg Dopka

August 16, 2025 27	Colorado Rapids	3–1	Atlanta United FC	Commerce City, Colorado
7:30 p.m. MDT	Yapi 18'; Murphy (yellow card) 47'; Navarro 64' (pen.), 71'; Cannon (yellow card) 90+6'	Report	Miranchuk 20'	Stadium: Dick's Sporting Goods Park; Attendance: 16,117; Referee: Victor Rivas

August 23, 2025 28	LA Galaxy	3–0	Colorado Rapids	Carson, California
8:30 p.m. MDT	Miller 7'; Wynder 55', (yellow card) 69'; Pec 75'; Sanabria (yellow card) 90+2'	Report	Cannon (yellow card) 61'	Stadium: Dignity Health Sports Park; Attendance: 20,203; Referee: Pierre-Luc Lauziere

August 30, 2025 29	Sporting Kansas City	4–2	Colorado Rapids	Kansas City, Kansas
6:30 p.m. MDT	Joveljić 4', 81'; Bassong (yellow card) 16'; James (yellow card) 52'; Sallói 73'; Toye 75'	Report	Navarro 22'; Rosenberry 31'	Stadium: Children's Mercy Park; Attendance: 16,262; Referee: Fotis Bazakos

September 13, 2025 30	Colorado Rapids	2–1	Houston Dynamo FC	Commerce City, Colorado
7:30 p.m. MDT	C. Bassett 10'; Navarro (yellow card) 51'; Cannon (yellow card) 65'; Andrade 90+6' (o.g.); Aaronson (yellow card) 90+7'	Report	McGlynn 68'; Artur (yellow card) 70' (yellow-red card) 90+8'	Stadium: Dick's Sporting Goods Park; Attendance: 15,128; Referee: Filip Dujic

September 20, 2025 31	FC Dallas	3–1	Colorado Rapids	Frisco, Texas
6:30 p.m. MDT	Musa 14'; Cappis 36'; Maxsø 80' (o.g.)	Report	Harris 21'; C. Bassett (yellow card) 31'; Yapi (yellow card) 90+5'	Stadium: Toyota Stadium; Attendance: 11,004; Referee: Drew Fischer

September 27, 2025 32	Colorado Rapids	1–1	Minnesota United FC	Commerce City, Colorado
7:30 p.m. MDT	Aaronson (yellow card) 8'; Santos 45+1'; Holding (yellow card) 54'	Report	Triantis 65'	Stadium: Dick's Sporting Goods Park; Attendance: 16,503; Referee: Ismail Elfath

October 4, 2025 33	Real Salt Lake	1–0	Colorado Rapids	Sandy, Utah
7:30 p.m. MDT	Gonçalves 39'; Ojeda (yellow card) 90+3'	Report		Stadium: America First Field; Attendance: 20,338; Referee: Chris Penso

October 18, 2025 34	Colorado Rapids	2–2	Los Angeles FC	Commerce City, Colorado
7:00 p.m. MDT	Cannon (yellow card) 17'; Aaronson (yellow card) 45+2', (goal) 62'; Ku-Dipietro (yellow card) 54'; Yapi 87'	Report	Porteous (yellow card) 15'; Segura (yellow card) 26'; Son Heung-min 42'; Tafari (yellow card) 64'; Moran 90'	Stadium: Dick's Sporting Goods Park; Attendance: 18,258; Referee: Rubiel Vazquez

=== U.S. Open Cup ===
Colorado Rapids did not send their senior squad or Colorado Rapids 2 to the U.S. Open Cup as they were already participating the in 2025 CONCACAF Champions Cup and the 2025 Leagues Cup.

=== Leagues Cup ===
July 31 Group Stage	Colorado Rapids (United States)	2–1	(Mexico) Santos Laguna	Commerce City, Colorado
7:30 p.m. MDT	Navarro 62', 86'; Cannon (yellow card) 70'; Mihailovic (yellow card) 77'	Report	Medina (yellow card) 35'; Prieto (yellow card) 40'; Carrillo 53'; Balanta (yellow card) 59'; Fagúndez (yellow card) 90+4'; Acevedo (red card) 90+7'; Ocejo (yellow card) 90+9'	Stadium: Dick's Sporting Goods Park; Attendance: 13,662; Referee: Kwinsi Williams

August 3 Group Stage	Colorado Rapids (United States)	1–2	(Mexico) Tijuana	Commerce City, Colorado
7:30 p.m. MDT	Frederick (yellow card) 11'; Porozo 74' (o.g.)	Report	Mora (yellow card) 12'; Fernández (yellow card) 30'; Porozo 39'; Árciga 72'	Stadium: Dick's Sporting Goods Park; Attendance: 13,717; Referee: Karen Hernández

August 7 Group Stage	Cruz Azul (Mexico)	2–2 (5–4 p)	(United States) Colorado Rapids	Carson, California
6:30 p.m. MDT	Ditta 43', (yellow card) 56'; Rivero 78'; Márquez (yellow card) 82'	Report	Navarro 3'; Maxsø 41'; Yapi (yellow card) 78'	Stadium: Dignity Health Sports Park; Attendance: 8,454; Referee: Joseph Dickerson
	Penalties
	Lira (penalty scored); Bogusz (penalty scored); Paradela (penalty scored); Piovi (penalty scored); Rodríguez (penalty scored)		(penalty scored) Yapi; (penalty missed) Larraz; (penalty scored) Harris; (penalty scored) Wathuta; (penalty scored) S. Bassett

=== Round One ===
February 18 Round One; 1st Leg	Colorado Rapids (United States)	2–1	(United States) Los Angeles FC	Commerce City, Colorado
8:00 p.m. MST	Awaziem (yellow card) 40'; Mihailovic 48' (pen.), 80'	Report	Long 87'	Stadium: Dick's Sporting Goods Park; Attendance: 1,811; Referee: Reon Radix

February 25 Round One; 2nd Leg	Los Angeles FC (United States)	1–0	(United States) Colorado Rapids	Los Angeles, California
8:00 p.m. MST	Delgado 49'; Tillman (yellow card) 56'	Report	Atencio (yellow card) 43'; Larraz (yellow card) 60'; C. Bassett (yellow card) 61'; Cannon (yellow card) 66'; Rosenberry (yellow card) 72'	Stadium: BMO Stadium; Attendance: 17,203; Referee: Pierre-Luc Lauziere
Note: 2–2 on aggregate. Los Angeles FC won on away goals.
