= 2024 Colorado Rapids season =

Colorado Rapids
2024 season
- Owner: Stan Kroenke
- Head coach: Chris Armas
- Major League Soccer: Conference: 7th Overall: 12th
- MLS Cup playoffs: Round one
- Leagues Cup: 3rd
- Top goalscorer: League: Rafael Navarro (15); All: Rafael Navarro (16)
- Average home league attendance: 15,336
Away colors

The 2024 Colorado Rapids season was the 29th season of the club's existence and the 29th season in Major League Soccer, the top tier of soccer in the United States.

== Transfers ==
=== In ===
Νο.	Pos.	Nat.	Name	Age	Moving from	Type	Transfer window	Transfer fee	Ref.
—	GK	(United States)	Zack Steffen	28	(England) Manchester City	Transfer	Winter	$2.5M	
—	DF	(Venezuela)	Miguel Navarro	24	(United States) Chicago Fire	Trade	Winter	—N/a (Note: Miguel Navarro and $450,000 of General Allocation Money was traded from Colorado Rapids to Chicago Fire in exchange for Andrew Gutman.)	
—	FW	(Canada)	Kimani Stewart-Baynes		(United States) Maryland Terrapins	Drafted	Winter	—N/a (Note: Selected in the 2024 MLS SuperDraft out of collegiate soccer.)	
—	POS	(United States)	Omir Fernandez	24	(United States) Red Bull New York	Transfer	Winter	Free	
—	POS	(United States)	Adam Beaudry		(United States) Colorado Rapids Academy	Free	Winter	Free	
—	POS	(Germany)	Jasper Löffelsend	26	(United States) Real Salt Lake	Trade	Winter	$100K (Note: Jasper Löffelsend was acquired from Colorado Rapids to Chicago Fire in exchange for $100,000 of General Allocation Money a second-round pick in the 2025 MLS SuperDraft, and a 2024 International Roster Spot.)	
—	POS	(Trinidad and Tobago)	Wayne Frederick		(United States) Duke Blue Devils	Drafted	Winter	—N/a	
—	POS	(United States)	Nate Jones		(United States) Washington Huskies	Drafted	Winter	—N/a	
10	MF	(United States)	Djordje Mihailovic	25	(Netherlands) AZ	Transfer	Winter	$3.0M	

=== Out ===
Νο.	Pos.	Nat.	Name	Age	Moving to	Type	Transfer window	Transfer fee	Ref.
13	DF	(United States)	Andrew Gutman	27	(United States) Chicago Fire	Trade	Winter	$450K	

== Non-competitive ==
=== Preseason ===
January 23	Atlético Morelia	3–1	Colorado Rapids	Querétaro, Mexico
11:00 CST	Islas 14'; Ramírez 28'; Maleck 58'	Report	Lewis 66'	Stadium: Querétaro Olympic Stadium

January 29	Querétaro	1–5	Colorado Rapids	Querétaro, Mexico
11:30 CST				Stadium: Corregidora Stadium

February 2	Atlante	1–5	Colorado Rapids	Querétaro, Mexico
11:00 CST				Stadium: Querétaro Olympic Stadium

February 10	CF Montréal	2–6	Colorado Rapids	Bay Lake, Florida
16:00 CST				Stadium: Hess Sports Field

February 14	Hartford Athletic	2–2	Colorado Rapids	Bay Lake, Florida
9:00 CST				Stadium: Hess Sports Field

February 17	Orlando City SC	3–2	Colorado Rapids	Bay Lake, Florida
10:00 CST				Stadium: Hess Sports Field

== Competitive ==
=== Major League Soccer ===
==== Standings ====
===== Western Conference =====
MLS Western Conference table (2024)
Pos	Team	Pld	W	L	T	GF	GA	GD	Pts	Qualification
5	Houston Dynamo FC	34	15	10	9	47	39	+8	54	Qualification for round one and the 2025 Leagues Cup
6	Minnesota United FC	34	15	12	7	58	49	+9	52	Qualification for round one and the 2025 Leagues Cup
7	Colorado Rapids	34	15	14	5	61	60	+1	50	Qualification for round one and the 2025 Leagues Cup
8	Vancouver Whitecaps FC	34	13	13	8	52	49	+3	47	Qualification for the wild-card round (Note: Vancouver Whitecaps FC did not qualify for the Leagues Cup due to winning the 2024 Canadian Championship, giving them a place in the 2025 CONCACAF Champions Cup. As MLS teams can participate in no more than two cup competitions, their spot in Leagues Cup was given to San Diego FC.)
9	Portland Timbers	34	12	11	11	65	56	+9	47	Qualification for the wild-card round and the 2025 Leagues Cup

Source: MLS
Rules for classification: 1) points; 2) total wins; 3) total goal differential; 4) total goals scored; 5) fewer disciplinary points; 6) away goal differential; 7) away goals scored; 8) home goals differential; 9) home goals scored; 10) coin toss (2 clubs tied) or drawing of lots (≥3 clubs tied)

===== Overall table =====
Overall MLS standings table
Pos	Team	Pld	W	L	T	GF	GA	GD	Pts	Qualification
10	Minnesota United FC	34	15	12	7	58	49	+9	52	Qualification for the U.S. Open Cup Round of 32 (Note: As one of the best U.S. teams in the overall table to not qualify for the 2025 CONCACAF Champions Cup)
11	Charlotte FC	34	14	11	9	46	37	+9	51	Qualification for the U.S. Open Cup Round of 32
12	Colorado Rapids	34	15	14	5	61	60	+1	50	Qualification for the CONCACAF Champions Cup Round One (Note: As third place of Leagues Cup)
13	New York City FC	34	14	12	8	54	49	+5	50	Qualification for the U.S. Open Cup Round of 32
14	Vancouver Whitecaps FC (V)	34	13	13	8	52	49	+3	47	Qualification for the CONCACAF Champions Cup Round One (Note: As winners of Canadian Championship)

Source: MLS
Rules for classification: 1) points; 2) total wins; 3) total goal differential; 4) total goals scored; 5) fewer disciplinary points; 6) away goal differential; 7) away goals scored; 8) home goals differential; 9) home goals scored; 10) coin toss (2 clubs tied) or drawing of lots (≥3 clubs tied)
(V) Canadian Championship winners

==== Match results ====
February 24, 2024 1	Portland Timbers	4−1	Colorado Rapids	Portland, Oregon
20:30 MST	Williamson 9'; Antony 14', 29'; Paredes (yellow card) 45'; Vines 45+5' (o.g.); Miller (yellow card) 49'	Report	Bombito (yellow card) 45+4'; Harris 55'; Maxsø (yellow card) 59'; Mihailovic (yellow card) 75'	Stadium: Providence Park; Attendance: 21,411; Referee: Aleksandar Zhelyazkov

March 2, 2024 2	Colorado Rapids	1−1	Nashville SC	Commerce City, Colorado
19:30 MST	Moore 47' (o.g.); Yapi (yellow card) 74'	Report	Bunbury 90' (pen.)	Stadium: Dick's Sporting Goods Park; Attendance: 16,223; Referee: Esteban Rosano

March 9, 2024 3	Real Salt Lake	1–2	Colorado Rapids	Sandy, Utah
19:30 MST	Eneli 22'; Hidalgo (yellow card) 40'; Vera (yellow card) 87'; Luna (yellow card) 90+'	Report	Navarro 43' (pen.); Löffelsend (yellow card) 58'; Bassett 70'	Stadium: America First Field; Attendance: 20,147; Referee: Atahan Yara

March 16, 2024 4	Seattle Sounders FC	1–1	Colorado Rapids	Seattle, Washington
13:30 MDT	Ruidíaz 11'; Nouhou (yellow card) 42'; Atencio (yellow card) 48' (yellow-red card) 57'; Leyva (yellow card) 86'	Report	Steffen (yellow card) 12'; Cabral 88', (yellow card) 90+2'	Stadium: Lumen Field; Attendance: 30,036; Referee: Trevor Wiseman

March 23, 2024 5	Colorado Rapids	0–1	Houston Dynamo FC	Commerce City, Colorado
19:30 MDT	Abubakar (yellow card) 65'	Report	Escobar (yellow card) 64'; Smith 90+6'	Stadium: Dick's Sporting Goods Park; Attendance: 13,432; Referee: Mario Maric

March 30, 2024 6	Colorado Rapids	3–2	Los Angeles FC	Commerce City, Colorado
14:00 MDT	Harris (yellow card) 33'; Bombito 38'; Mihailovic (yellow card) 56', (goal) 83', 89'; Navarro (yellow card) 90+7'	Report	Atuesta 8'; Tillman (yellow card) 43'; Martínez 76', (yellow card) 78' (yellow-red card) 85'; Segura (yellow card) 81'	Stadium: Dick's Sporting Goods Park; Attendance: 14,368; Referee: Armando Villarreal

April 6, 2024 7	Inter Miami CF	2–2	Colorado Rapids	Fort Lauderdale, Florida
17:30 MDT	Negri (yellow card) 38'; Messi 58'; Afonso 60'; Weigandt (yellow card) 90+4'; Alba (yellow card) 90+5'	Report	Navarro (yellow card) 19', (goal) 45'; Cabral (yellow card) 40'; Bassett 88'	Stadium: Chase Stadium; Attendance: 20,868; Referee: Ted Unkel

April 13, 2024 8	San Jose Earthquakes	0–3	Colorado Rapids	San Jose, California
20:30 MDT	Morales (yellow card) 32'; Marie (yellow card) 48'; Judd (yellow card) 80'	Report	Navarro 10', 60'; Bassett (yellow card) 37', (goal) 80'	Stadium: PayPal Park; Attendance: 14,232; Referee: Malik Badawi

April 20, 2024 9	Colorado Rapids	2–1	FC Dallas	Commerce City, Colorado
19:30 MDT	Ibeagha 45' (o.g.); Harris 49'	Report	Ibeagha (yellow card) 27'; Junqua (yellow card) 61'; Musa 87'; Farrington (yellow card) 90+7'	Stadium: Dick's Sporting Goods Park; Attendance: 7,492; Referee: Ricardo Fierro

April 27, 2024 10	FC Cincinnati	2–1	Colorado Rapids	Cincinnati, Ohio
17:30 MDT	Miazga (yellow card) 26'; Acosta 42'; Bucha (yellow card) 58'; Baird 64'	Report	Bombito 72', (yellow card) 81'	Stadium: TQL Stadium; Attendance: 25,513; Referee: Sergii Boiko

May 5, 2024 11	New York City FC	0–2	Colorado Rapids	New York, New York
14:00 MDT	Sands (yellow card) 37'	Report	Navarro 16'; Larraz (yellow card) 20'; Bassett 86'	Stadium: Citi Field; Attendance: 19,456; Referee: Allen Chapman

May 11, 2024 12	Colorado Rapids	2–3	San Jose Earthquakes	Commerce City, Colorado
19:30 MDT	Mihailović (yellow card) 15'; Navarro 33', (yellow card) 84'; Fernandez 42'	Report	Pellegrino 44'; López 45+6'; Espinoza 66'; Vítor Costa (yellow card) 68'; Wilson (yellow card) 72'	Stadium: Dick's Sporting Goods Park; Attendance: 15,557; Referee: Natalie Simon

May 15, 2024 13	Colorado Rapids	1–0	Vancouver Whitecaps FC	Commerce City, Colorado
19:30 MDT	Navarro 45+5'	Report	Utvik (red card) 45+4'	Stadium: Dick's Sporting Goods Park; Attendance: 11,190; Referee: Alexis Da Silva

May 18, 2024 14	Real Salt Lake	5–3	Colorado Rapids	Sandy, Utah
19:30 MDT	Arango 23', 85'; A. Gómez 40', 88', (yellow card) 90'; Crooks (yellow card) 51'; Vera (yellow card) 65'; Eneli (yellow card) 79'; Julio 90+6'	Report	Bassett 5'; Navarro 19'; Steffen (yellow card) 32'; Mihailović 56'; Yapi (yellow card) 90+9'	Stadium: America First Field; Attendance: 20,213; Referee: Jon Freemon

May 25, 2024 15	Colorado Rapids	3–3	Minnesota United FC	Commerce City, Colorado
19:30 MDT	Cabral 18', 71'; Navarro 62'	Report	Jeong 8', 33'; Oluwaseyi 27'; Rosales (yellow card) 53'; Taylor (yellow card) 67'; Arriaga (yellow card) 69'; Padelford (yellow card) 74'	Stadium: Dick's Sporting Goods Park; Attendance: 16,201; Referee: Filip Dujic

May 29, 2024 16	Houston Dynamo FC	3–1	Colorado Rapids	Houston, Texas
18:30 MDT	Bassi 40'; Blessing 70'; Aliyu (yellow card) 77'; Kowalczyk 80'	Report	Anderson (yellow card) 42'; Mihailović 49'	Stadium: Shell Energy Stadium; Attendance: 15,237; Referee: Marcos DeOliveira II

June 1, 2024 17	Vancouver Whitecaps FC	2–1	Colorado Rapids	Vancouver, British Columbia
20:30 MDT	Blackmon (yellow card) 9'; Berhalter 46'; Gauld (yellow card) 69'; Kreilach 90+1'	Report	Yapi (yellow card) 20'; Maxsø (yellow card) 45'; Mihailovic 50'	Stadium: BC Place; Attendance: 22,979; Referee: Michael Venne

June 15, 2024 18	Colorado Rapids	2–0	Austin FC	Commerce City, Colorado
19:30 MDT	Bassett 22'; Navarro 49'	Report	Obrian (yellow card) 46'; Ring (yellow card) 64'	Stadium: Dick's Sporting Goods Park; Attendance: 17,433; Referee: Malik Badawi

June 19, 2024 19	St. Louis City SC	0–3	Colorado Rapids	St. Louis, Missouri
18:30 MDT	Klauss (yellow card) 15'; Yaro (yellow card) 64'; Kijima (yellow card) 81'; Watts (yellow card) 90+5'	Report	Mihailovic 9', 60', 90+6', (yellow card) 57'; Ronan (yellow card) 73'	Stadium: CityPark; Attendance: 22,500; Referee: Guido Gonzales, Jr.

June 22, 2024 20	Colorado Rapids	4–1	CF Montréal	Commerce City, Colorado
19:30 MDT	Harris 28', 45'; Mihailovic 90'; Navarro 90+2'	Report	Edwards (yellow card) 27'; Abubakar 53' (o.g.); Campbell (yellow card) 89'	Stadium: Dick's Sporting Goods Park; Attendance: 15,583; Referee: Rosendo Mendoza

June 29, 2024 21	Los Angeles FC	3–0	Colorado Rapids	Los Angeles, California
20:30 MDT	Bogusz 20', 58', 72'; Murillo (yellow card) 41'	Report	Cabral (yellow card) 3' (yellow-red card) 62'; Navarro (yellow card) 36'; Abubakar (yellow card) 41'; Löffelsend (yellow card) 83'	Stadium: BMO Stadium; Attendance: 22,019; Referee: Chris Penso

July 4, 2024 22	Colorado Rapids	2–1	Sporting Kansas City	Commerce City, Colorado
19:30 MDT	Harris (yellow card) 54'; Larraz 69'; Mihailovic (yellow card) 87', (goal) 90+4'	Report	Russell 48'; Radoja (yellow card) 73'; Melia (yellow card) 90+3'	Stadium: Dick's Sporting Goods Park; Attendance: 18,183; Referee: Sergii Boiko

July 7, 2024 23	Colorado Rapids	4–1	St. Louis City SC	Commerce City, Colorado
19:30 MDT	Cabral 6'; Bassett 35'; Lewis 81'; Yapi 90'	Report	Klein III 12'; Durkin (yellow card) 75'	Stadium: Dick's Sporting Goods Park; Attendance: 16,331; Referee: Drew Fischer

July 13, 2024 24	Colorado Rapids	1−1	New York Red Bulls	Commerce City, Colorado
19:30 MDT	Nealis 64' (o.g.); Lewis (yellow card) 90+1'	Report	Morgan 45+1'; Edelman (yellow card) 70'; Eile (yellow card) 80'	Stadium: Dick's Sporting Goods Park; Attendance: 15,387; Referee: Timothy Ford

July 17, 2024 25	LA Galaxy	3–2	Colorado Rapids	Carson, California
20:30 MDT	Fagúndez 12'; Paintsil 38'; Puig 43'; Cerrillo (yellow card) 67'	Report	Maxsø (yellow card) 8'; Cabral 32'; Bassett 45+10'; Löffelsend (yellow card) 46'; Bombito (yellow card) 71'	Stadium: Dignity Health Sports Park; Attendance: 19,488; Referee: Ismir Pekmic

July 20, 2024 26	Colorado Rapids	3–2	Real Salt Lake	Commerce City, Colorado
19:30 MDT	Bombito (yellow card) 23'; Lewis 35'; Vines 39'; Yapi (yellow card) 74'; Bassett 88'	Report	Gómez 9', 49'; Luna (yellow card) 88'	Stadium: Dick's Sporting Goods Park; Referee: Ramy Touchan

August 31, 2024 27	FC Dallas	2–3	Colorado Rapids	Frisco, Texas
18:30 MDT	Farrington 6'; Ntsabeleng (yellow card) 33'; Junqua (yellow card) 65'; Musa 66'; Velasco (yellow card) 90+5'; Ruan (yellow card) 90+8'	Report	Navarro 11', 76' (yellow card) 62'; Yapi (yellow card) 89' (goal) 90+3'; Edwards (yellow card) 90+10'	Stadium: Toyota Stadium; Attendance: 19,096; Referee: Ricardo Montero

September 14, 2024 28	Colorado Rapids	2–1	Portland Timbers	Commerce City, Colorado
19:30 MDT	Lewis 14'; Harris (yellow card) 65'; Navarro 71'; Yapi (red card) 90+8'	Report	Ayala 24'; Chará (yellow card) 78'	Stadium: Dick's Sporting Goods Park; Attendance: 16,038; Referee: Filip Dujic

September 18, 2024 29	Sporting Kansas City	4–1	Colorado Rapids	Kansas City, Kansas
18:30 MDT	Pulido 8', 49'; Thommy 69', 82'; Sallói (yellow card) 74'; Vargas (yellow card) 90+2'	Report	Harris (yellow card) 16'; Navarro (yellow card) 38'; Edwards 75'	Stadium: Children's Mercy Park; Attendance: 14,826; Referee: Fotis Bazakos

September 21, 2024 30	Colorado Rapids	2–0	Toronto FC	Commerce City, Colorado
19:30 MDT	Larraz (yellow card) 23'; Cannon 52'; Rosenberry (yellow card) 81'; Mihailovic 90+1' (pen.)	Report	Owusu (yellow card) 37'; O'Neill (yellow card) 43'; Flores (yellow card) 70'; Mabika (yellow card) 89'; Kerr (yellow card) 90+4'	Stadium: Dick's Sporting Goods Park; Attendance: 15,896; Referee: Rosendo Mendoza

September 28, 2024 31	Minnesota United FC	3–0	Colorado Rapids	Saint Paul, Minnesota
18:30 MDT	Yeboah 16'; Hlongwane (yellow card) 25'; Yeboah 47'; Díaz (yellow card) 79'; Dotson 82'; Boxall (yellow card) 90+1'	Report	Cannon (yellow card) 52'; Harris (yellow card) 90+6'	Stadium: Allianz Field; Attendance: 19,814; Referee: Lorenzo Hernandez

October 2, 2024 32	Colorado Rapids	1–3	LA Galaxy	Commerce City, Colorado
19:30 MDT	Ronan 45'; Mihailovic (yellow card) 61'	Report	Pec 50'; Puig 58', 90+1'; Delgado (yellow card) 73'	Stadium: Dick's Sporting Goods Park; Attendance: 15,196; Referee: Pierre-Luc Lauziere

October 5, 2024 33	Colorado Rapids	0–1	Seattle Sounders FC	Commerce City, Colorado
19:30 MDT		Report	Yeimar (yellow card) 27'; Rusnák 48'; Ragen (yellow card) 65'	Stadium: Dick's Sporting Goods Park; Attendance: 18,096; Referee: Timothy Ford

October 19, 2024 34	Austin FC	3–2	Colorado Rapids	Austin, Texas
19:00 MDT	Cascante (yellow card) 3'; Driussi 8' (pen.), (yellow card) 45+4'; Jiménez (yellow card) 28'; Ring (yellow card) 45+4'; Svatok (yellow card) 61'; Gallagher (yellow card) 73'; Finlay 90+1'; Hines-Ike 90+3'	Report	Abubakar (yellow card) 30'; Navarro 42'; Fernández 75' (pen.)	Stadium: Q2 Stadium; Attendance: 20,738; Referee: Chris Penso

=== MLS Cup playoffs ===
==== Round One ====
October 25 Game 1	LA Galaxy	5–0	Colorado Rapids	Carson, California
21:00 MDT	Joveljić 32', 75'; Nelson 52', 87'; Puig 54'	Report	Navarro (yellow card) 37'; Cannon (yellow card) 40'; Abubaker (yellow card) 49'	Stadium: Dignity Health Sports Park; Attendance: 24,537; Referee: Lukasz Szpala

November 1 Game 2	Colorado Rapids	1–4	LA Galaxy	Commerce City, Colorado
19:30 MDT	Abubaker (yellow card) 3'; Larraz 19'; Cannon (yellow card) 85'	Report	Pec 8'; Paintsil 45+3'; Cerrillo (yellow card) 72'; Nelson (yellow card) 90'; Puig 90+1', 90+4'	Stadium: Dick's Sporting Goods Park; Attendance: 16,010; Referee: Victor Rivas
Note: LA Galaxy won the series 2–0.

=== U.S. Open Cup ===
The Colorado Rapids were not sent to the tournament, but their MLS Next Pro team Colorado Rapids 2 were sent instead following the deal reached on March 1, 2024.

=== Leagues Cup ===
==== West 5 ====
Pos	Team	Pld	W	PW	PL	L	GF	GA	GD	Pts	Qualification	POR	COL	LEO
1	(United States Soccer Federation) Portland Timbers	2	2	0	0	0	6	1	+5	6	Advance to knockout stage	—	3–0	—
2	(United States Soccer Federation) Colorado Rapids	2	0	1	0	1	1	5	−4	2	Advance to knockout stage	—	—	—
3	(Mexican Football Federation) León	2	0	0	1	1	2	3	−1	1		1–2	1–1	—

Source: Leagues Cup
Rules for classification: Tiebreakers

August 1 Group stage	Portland Timbers (United States)	4–0	(United States) Colorado Rapids	Portland, Oregon
20:30 MDT	Antony 30'; Ayala 52'; Toye 69'; Moreno 71'; Crépeau (yellow card) 83'; Paredes (yellow card) 84'	Report	Maxsø (yellow card) 31'	Stadium: Providence Park; Attendance: 12,453; Referee: Steffon Dewar

August 5 Group stage	(United States) Colorado Rapids	1–1 (4–3 p)	León (Mexico)	Commerce City, Colorado
19:00 MDT	Bellón (yellow card) 58'; Ambríz (yellow card) 64'; Guerra 77'	Report	Ronan (yellow card) 40'; Bassett (yellow card) 45'; Rafael Navarro (yellow card) 90+5', (goal) 90+7'	Stadium: Dick's Sporting Goods Park; Referee: Julio Luna
	Penalties
	Cádiz (penalty scored); Barreiro (penalty scored); Guardado (penalty missed); Mendoza (penalty scored); Reyes (penalty missed)		(penalty scored) Mihailovic; (penalty scored) Bassett; (penalty scored) Rafael Navarro; (penalty scored) Bombito; (penalty missed) Maxsø

==== Knockout stage ====
August 9 Round of 32	(United States) Colorado Rapids	3–2	Juárez (Mexico)	Commerce City, Colorado
19:30 MDT	Zaldívar 18'; Hurtado 71' (pen.); Villalpando (yellow card) 82'	Report	Lewis 28'; Mihailovic 45' (pen.); Harris 59'; Navarro (yellow card) 90+2'; Steffen (yellow card) 90+5'	Stadium: Dick's Sporting Goods Park; Attendance: 11,442; Referee: Armando Villarreal (United States)

August 13 Round of 16	(United States) Colorado Rapids	2–1	Toluca (Mexico)	Commerce City, Colorado
20:00 MDT	Amaya (yellow card) 41'; Fernandes 83'	Report	Mihailovic (yellow card) 12'; Navarro 45'; Yapi 90+6'	Stadium: Dick's Sporting Goods Park; Attendance: 9,742; Referee: Walter López (Guatemala)

August 17 Quarterfinals	América (Mexico)	0–0 (8–9 p)	(United States) Colorado Rapids	Carson, California
20:00 MDT		Report	Fernandez (yellow card) 28'; Navarro (yellow card) 88'	Stadium: Dignity Health Sports Park; Attendance: 22,462; Referee: Keylor Herrera
	Penalties
	Martín (penalty scored); Reyes (penalty scored); Sánchez (penalty scored); Cáceres (penalty scored); Lichnovsky (penalty missed); Steffen (penalty scored); Fidalgo (penalty scored); Hernández (penalty scored); Espinoza (penalty scored); Malagón (penalty missed)		(penalty scored) Mihailovic; (penalty scored) Bassett; (penalty missed) Rafael Navarro; (penalty scored) Maxsø; (penalty scored) Ronan; (penalty scored) Rosenberry; (penalty scored) Larraz; (penalty scored) Vines; (penalty scored) Harris; (penalty scored) Steffen

August 21 Semifinals	Los Angeles FC (United States)	4–0	(United States) Colorado Rapids	Los Angeles, California
--:-- ET	Bogusz 42'; Kamara 45'; Bouanga 59'; O'Brien 75'; Olivera (yellow card) 87'	Report	Abubakar (yellow card) 84'	Stadium: BMO Stadium; Referee: Mario Escobar

August 25 3rd	Philadelphia Union (United States)	2–2 (1–3 p)	(United States) Colorado Rapids	Chester, Pennsylvania
--:-- ET	Wagner (yellow card) 26'; Baribo 41', 44'	Report	Maxsø (yellow card) 25'; Harris 38'; Larraz 49'	Stadium: Subaru Park; Referee: Fernando Guerrero
	Penalties
	Gazdag (penalty missed); Baribo (penalty missed); Elliott (penalty scored); Mbaizo (penalty missed)		(penalty scored) Mihailovic; (penalty scored) Bassett; (penalty scored) Maxsø; (penalty missed) Ronan
