= Kimani Stewart-Baynes =

Canadian soccer player (born 2005)

Personal information
- Full name: Kimani Aidan Stewart-Baynes
- Date of birth: January 17, 2005 (age 21)
- Place of birth: Kingstown, Saint Vincent and the Grenadines
- Height: 5 ft 9 in (1.75 m)
- Position: Forward

Team information
- Current team: Colorado Rapids
- Number: 27

Youth career
- Vaughan Azzurri

College career
Years	Team	Apps	(Gls)
2023	Maryland Terrapins	14	(3)

Senior career*
Years	Team	Apps	(Gls)
2023	HFX Wanderers	0	(0)
2024–	Colorado Rapids	18	(0)
2024–	→ Colorado Rapids 2 (loan)	23	(4)
2025	→ Lexington SC (loan)	0	(0)

International career^{‡}
2024	Canada U20	6	(0)
- * Club domestic league appearances and goals as of May 2, 2026 ‡ National team caps and goals as of July 30, 2024

Kimani Aidan Stewart-Baynes (born January 17, 2005) is a professional soccer player who plays for Major League Soccer club Colorado Rapids. Born in Saint Vincent and the Grenadines, he represents Canada at youth international level.

== Early life ==
Stewart-Bayes was born in Kingstown, Saint Vincent and the Grenadines and grew up in Toronto, Canada. He played youth soccer with Vaughan Azzurri and helped them win the League1 Ontario U19 Reserve Division in 2022.

== College career ==
In April 2023, he committed to attend Maryland University to play for the men's soccer team. He made his collegiate debut in the season opener on August 24 against the Missouri State Bears. He scored his first goal in the next match on August 27 against the UNC Greensboro Spartans.

At the end of his freshman season, he was named the Big Ten Conference Freshman of the Year and was selected to the All-Freshman Team. He was then invited to participate in the MLS College Showcase ahead of the 2024 MLS SuperDraft. In fourteen matches in his sole season, he scored three goals and added seven assists.

== Club career ==
In March 2023, Stewart-Baynes signed a developmental contract with the HFX Wanderers of the Canadian Premier League.

In December 2023 ahead of the 2024 MLS SuperDraft, Stewart-Baynes signed a Generation Adidas contract with Major League Soccer. At the draft, he was selected in the first round (fourth overall) by the Colorado Rapids.

Stewart-Baynes made his professional debut in MLS Next Pro for Colorado Rapids 2 on March 17 against St. Louis City 2. On March 23, he made his MLS debut against the Houston Dynamo, entering as a late substitute in an eventual 1-0 defeat.

== International career ==
In February 2024, Stewart-Baynes was named to the Canada U20 squad for the 2024 CONCACAF Under-20 Championship qualifiers. In July 2024, he was named to the final roster for the tournament.

== Career statistics ==
As of match played May 2, 2026

Appearances and goals by club, season and competition
Club	Season	League			Playoffs		National cup		League cup		Continental		Total	
Club	Season	Division	Apps	Goals	Apps	Goals	Apps	Goals	Apps	Goals	Apps	Goals	Apps	Goals
Colorado Rapids	2024	MLS	13	0	0	0	0	0	3	0	0	0	16	0
Colorado Rapids	2025	MLS	4	0	0	0	0	0	0	0	1	0	5	0
Colorado Rapids	2026	MLS	1	0	0	0	0	0	0	0	0	0	1	0
Colorado Rapids	Total		18	0	0	0	0	0	3	0	1	0	22	0
Colorado Rapids 2 (loan)	2024	MLS Next Pro	6	0	0	0	2	1	0	0	0	0	8	1
Colorado Rapids 2 (loan)	2025	MLS Next Pro	12	4	0	0	0	0	0	0	0	0	12	4
Colorado Rapids 2 (loan)	2026	MLS Next Pro	5	0	0	0	0	0	0	0	0	0	5	0
Colorado Rapids 2 (loan)	Total		23	4	0	0	2	1	0	0	0	0	25	5
Career total			41	4	0	0	2	1	3	0	1	0	47	5

== Personal life ==
He is the brother of National Football League wide receiver N'Keal Harry.
