= Darren Yapi =

American soccer player (born 2004)

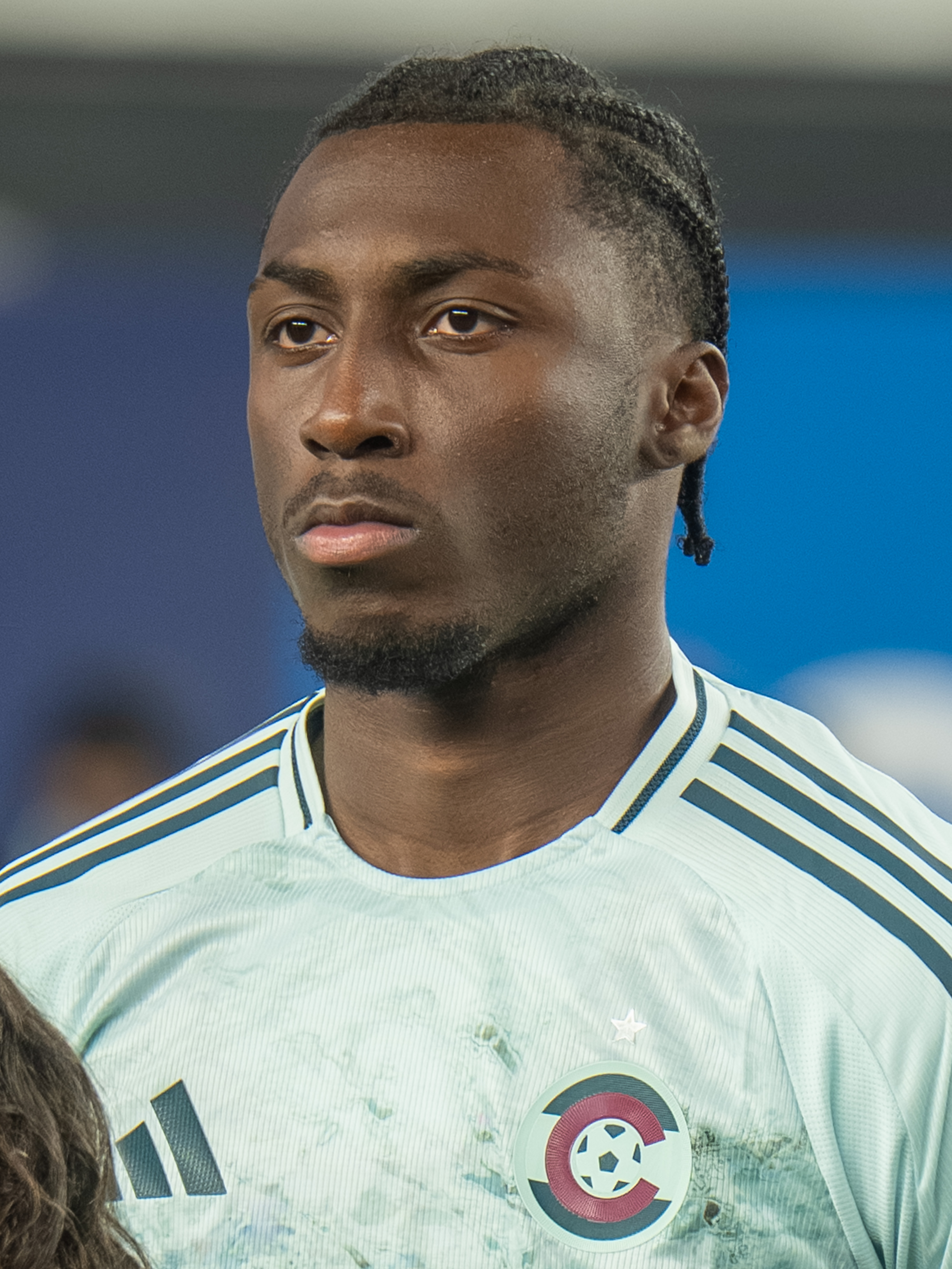
- Yapi with the Colorado Rapids in 2026

Personal information
- Full name: Darren Kissy Yapi
- Date of birth: November 19, 2004 (age 21)
- Place of birth: Denver, Colorado, United States
- Height: 6 ft 1 in (1.85 m)
- Position: Forward

Team information
- Current team: Colorado Rapids
- Number: 77

Youth career
- 2016–2021: Colorado Rapids

Senior career*
Years	Team	Apps	(Gls)
2020–	Colorado Rapids	90	(9)
2020–2021	→ Colorado Springs Switchbacks (loan)	17	(2)
2022–	→ Colorado Rapids 2 (loan)	34	(10)

International career^{‡}
2020	United States U17	3	(0)
2023	United States U20	6	(0)
2025–	United States U23	2	(0)
- * Club domestic league appearances and goals as of October 8, 2025 ‡ National team caps and goals as of November 18, 2025

Darren Kissy Yapi (born November 19, 2004) is an American professional soccer player who plays as a forward for Major League Soccer club Colorado Rapids.

== Club career ==
Yapi joined the Colorado Rapids academy in 2016. On July 31, 2020, Yapi moved to USL Championship side Colorado Springs Switchbacks on loan from the Rapids academy.

On March 3, 2021, Yapi signed with Colorado as a homegrown player.

== International career ==
In February 2020, Yapi represented the United States national under-17 team at the UEFA Development Tournament.

== Career statistics ==
=== Club ===
As of match played July 7, 2024

Appearances and goals by club, season and competition
Club	Season	League			National cup		Playoffs		Continental		Other		Total	
Club	Season	Division	Apps	Goals	Apps	Goals	Apps	Goals	Apps	Goals	Apps	Goals	Apps	Goals
Colorado Rapids	2021	Major League Soccer	—		—		—		—		—		—	
Colorado Rapids	2022	Major League Soccer	11	0	—		—		—		—		11	0
Colorado Rapids	2023	Major League Soccer	20	0	1	0	—		—		1	0	22	0
Colorado Rapids	2024	Major League Soccer	31	2	—		2	0	—		5	1	38	3
Colorado Rapids	2025	Major League Soccer	0	0	—		0	0	—		0	0	0	0
Colorado Rapids	Total		62	2	1	0	2	0	0	0	6	1	71	3
Colorado Springs Switchbacks (loan)	2020	USL Championship	1	0	—		—		—		—		1	0
Colorado Springs Switchbacks (loan)	2021	USL Championship	16	2	—		—		—		—		16	2
Colorado Springs Switchbacks (loan)	Total		17	2	0	0	0	0	0	0	0	0	17	2
Colorado Rapids 2	2022	MLS Next Pro	16	6	—		—		—		—		16	6
Colorado Rapids 2	2023	MLS Next Pro	7	3	—		—		—		—		7	3
Colorado Rapids 2	2024	MLS Next Pro	8	1	—		—		—		—		8	1
Colorado Rapids 2	2025	MLS Next Pro	0	0	—		—		—		—		0	0
Colorado Rapids 2	Total		31	10	0	0	0	0	0	0	0	0	31	10
Career total			110	14	1	0	2	0	0	0	6	1	119	15
