= Connor Ronan =

Irish footballer (born 1998)

Personal information
- Full name: Connor Patrick Ronan
- Date of birth: 6 March 1998 (age 28)
- Place of birth: Rochdale, England
- Height: 5 ft 7 in (1.71 m)
- Position: Midfielder

Team information
- Current team: Aberdeen
- Number: 25

Youth career
- –2009: Copperpot J.F.C.
- 2009–2014: Rochdale
- 2014–2016: Wolverhampton Wanderers

Senior career*
Years	Team	Apps	(Gls)
2016–2023	Wolverhampton Wanderers	8	(0)
2018	→ Portsmouth (loan)	16	(0)
2018	→ Walsall (loan)	11	(0)
2019	→ DAC Dunajská Streda (loan)	28	(1)
2020	→ Blackpool (loan)	10	(1)
2020–2021	→ Grasshoppers (loan)	30	(1)
2021–2022	→ St Mirren (loan)	27	(7)
2023–2026	Colorado Rapids	90	(2)
2026–	Aberdeen	0	(0)

International career
2015	England U17	2	(0)
2015	Republic of Ireland U17	5	(1)
2015–2017	Republic of Ireland U19	8	(1)
2017–2020	Republic of Ireland U21	14	(1)
- * Club domestic league appearances and goals as of 21:19, 18 June 2026 (UTC)

Connor Patrick Ronan (born 6 March 1998) is a professional footballer who plays as a midfielder for Scottish Premier League side Aberdeen. Born in Rochdale, England, he plays for the Republic of Ireland national team.

== Club career ==
Ronan started his career with Copperpot JFC and attended St Cuthbert's RC High School in Rochdale with whom he reached the final of the English National Schools Cup as a Year 7 in 2009 with a team that also included Axel Tuanzebe, Kisimba Kisimba and Johny Diba, who all went on to become professional. He then joined Rochdale, his boyhood club in which he stayed until he joined Wolverhampton Wanderers at the age of 16. Ronan made three appearances for the team's development squad in the 2016–17 EFL Trophy, scoring a goal in their 4–0 win over EFL League Two team Accrington Stanley. With Paul Lambert as manager, Ronan was part of the first-team squad for the first time on 26 November 2016, as an unused substitute in the 2–0 defeat to Sheffield Wednesday. Ronan made his debut on 17 December 2016, replacing Hélder Costa for the final nine minutes of the team's 2–0 win over Nottingham Forest.

On 31 August 2018, Ronan joined League One club Walsall on loan until January 2019 along with team-mate Connor Johnson. Ronan returned to Wolves at the conclusion of his loan spell, making 15 appearances in all competitions for Walsall.

He signed for League One club Blackpool on a six-month loan deal on 17 January 2020. His playing time was however restricted to ten games after the League One clubs voted to curtail the season owing to the COVID-19 outbreak.

In August 2020, he signed a new contract – lasting until 2024 – with Wolves before again being sent out on loan, this time joining Swiss side Grasshoppers for the 2020–21 season. His would make his first appearance coming on as a substitute in the second half, in a 3–0 victory against FC Wil. Ronan's first goal for the Swiss club came in a 3–0 home win against Neuchâtel Xamax, when he scored the second goal in the 91st minute.

In May 2020, Ronan returned to his parent club for treatment, after breaking his metatarsal bone, ruling him out for up to four to five months.

On 31 August 2021, Ronan sealed a season long loan to Scottish Premiership side St Mirren. He made his debut in a 0–0 draw at home to Dundee United in September. He made a habit of scoring sensational long range goals throughout his spell at St. Mirren, including a 30-yard strike in the Scottish Cup quarter-final.

On 23 January 2023, Ronan signed a four-year deal with the Colorado Rapids in Denver. It will see him play through to the 2026 Major League Soccer season, with an additional club option for 2027.

On 18 June 2026, Ronan signed a two-year deal with Scottish Premier League side Aberdeen.

== International career ==
Ronan has played at under 17, under 19 and under 21 level for the Republic of Ireland. Ronan was selected for the 2019 Toulon Tournament where he played in every match.

He was called up to the senior Republic of Ireland squad for the friendlies against Belgium and Lithuania on 26 and 29 March 2022 respectively.

== Career statistics ==
As of match played 29 May 2025

Appearances and goals by club, season and competition
Club	Season	League			National cup		League cup		Other		Total	
Club	Season	Division	Apps	Goals	Apps	Goals	Apps	Goals	Apps	Goals	Apps	Goals
Wolverhampton Wanderers	2016–17	EFL Championship	4	0	2	0	0	0	3 (Note: Appearances in the EFL Trophy with Wolverhampton Wanderers U23s)	1	9	1
Wolverhampton Wanderers	2017–18	EFL Championship	3	0	0	0	4	0	—		7	0
Wolverhampton Wanderers	2018–19	Premier League	0	0	0	0	0	0	—		0	0
Wolverhampton Wanderers	2022–23	Premier League	1	0	0	0	1	0	—		2	0
Wolverhampton Wanderers	Total		8	0	2	0	5	0	3	1	18	1
Portsmouth (loan)	2017–18	EFL League One	16	0	0	0	0	0	1 (Note: Appearance in the EFL Trophy)	0	17	0
Walsall (loan)	2018–19	EFL League One	11	0	0	0	0	0	4	0	15	0
FC DAC 1904 Dunajská Streda (loan)	2018–19	Slovak Super Liga	14	1	0	0	—		—		14	1
FC DAC 1904 Dunajská Streda (loan)	2019–20	Slovak Super Liga	14	0	2	0	—		4 (Note: Appearances in UEFA Europa League)	1	19	1
FC DAC 1904 Dunajská Streda (loan)	Total		28	1	2	0	—		4	1	34	2
Blackpool (loan)	2019–20	EFL League One	10	1	—		—		—		10	1
Grasshoppers (loan)	2020–21	Swiss Challenge League	30	1	2	0	—		—		32	1
St Mirren (loan)	2021–22	Scottish Premiership	26	7	3	1	—		—		29	8
Colorado Rapids	2023	Major League Soccer	34	1	2	0	—		2 (Note: Appearances in Leagues Cup)	0	38	1
Colorado Rapids	2024	Major League Soccer	28	1	0	0	—		7	0	35	1
Colorado Rapids	2025	Major League Soccer	10	0	0	0	—		0	0	10	0
Colorado Rapids	Total		72	2	2	0	—		9	0	83	2
Career total			201	12	11	0	5	0	21	2	275	15
