= Calvin Harris (footballer) =

English footballer (born 2000)

Personal information
- Full name: Calvin William Harris
- Date of birth: 20 March 2000 (age 26)
- Place of birth: Middlesbrough, England
- Positions: Winger; forward

Team information
- Current team: Sporting Kansas City
- Number: 14

Youth career
- 2010–2014: Hong Kong FC
- 2014–2018: Wellington Phoenix

College career
Years	Team	Apps	(Gls)
2019–2020	Wake Forest Demon Deacons	32	(10)

Senior career*
Years	Team	Apps	(Gls)
2018	Wellington Phoenix Reserves	6	(2)
2021–2022	FC Cincinnati	24	(1)
2022	FC Cincinnati 2	6	(3)
2023–2025	Colorado Rapids	77	(10)
2023	Colorado Rapids 2	5	(4)
2026–	Sporting Kansas City	9	(0)
- * Club domestic league appearances and goals as of 26 April 2026

Calvin William Harris (born 20 March 2000) is an English professional footballer who plays as a winger or forward for Major League Soccer club Sporting Kansas City.

== Early life ==
Harris was born in Middlesbrough, England. His father, Terry, played for Sheffield United. He moved to Hong Kong at the age of 10.

Harris began his youth career with Hong Kong FC. Harris would travel from Hong Kong and train at the APFA under high performance coach Jess Ibrom. When he was 14, Harris obtained a scholarship to join the youth academy of New Zealand side Wellington Phoenix. He made his debut for the senior team at the age of 16 in the 2017 Sisters City Cup against Beijing BG. He went on to represent the Phoenix in the HKFC Soccer Sevens in 2016, 2017 and 2018.

While Harris was free to appear in friendly games for Wellington Phoenix, he was unable to play in any organised competitions until he turned 18 due to FIFA laws prohibiting the international transfers of minors. In 2018, having turned 18, he finally began appearing for Wellington Phoenix's reserves in the New Zealand Football Championship, scoring two goals in six games. The Phoenix decided to not sign him to a first team contract for the A-League club as Harris' lack of a New Zealand passport meant they would have been required to use one of their five import slots.

== College career ==
Going into college, Harris chose Wake Forest over Akron, Elon, and North Carolina. As a freshman, Harris appeared in 23 games for Wake Forest, and scored six goals. He was also named to the 2019 All-ACC Freshman Team. In his second year with Wake Forest, Harris appeared in all nine matches of the fall season, which was shortened due to the COVID-19 pandemic, scoring four goals. Harris was named co-offensive Player of the Week for the week of 21–27 September, and then won the award a second time later.

== Club career ==
Harris signed a Generation Adidas contract with Major League Soccer, ahead of the 2021 MLS SuperDraft, where he was selected second overall by FC Cincinnati. Harris made his first appearance for FC Cincinnati in a friendly vs. Louisville City, coming on as a halftime substitute. His competitive debut came on 14 April 2021 in a 2–2 draw vs. Nashville SC. He made 14 appearances in his rookie season, but did not record a goal or assist.

On 21 December 2022, Harris was traded to Colorado Rapids in exchange for $200,000 in General Allocation Money, with potential for a further $175,000 in General Allocation Money.

On 15 January 2026, Harris joined Sporting Kansas City as a free agent.

== Career statistics ==
As of match played 17 March 2025

Appearances and goals by club, season and competition
Club	Season	League			Playoffs		National Cup		Other		Total	
Club	Season	Division	Apps	Goals	Apps	Goals	Apps	Goals	Apps	Goals	Apps	Goals
Wellington Phoenix Reserves	2018–19	New Zealand Football Championship	6	2	—		0	0	—		6	2
FC Cincinnati	2021	Major League Soccer	16	0	—		—		—		16	0
FC Cincinnati	2022	Major League Soccer	8	1	0	0	1	0	0	0	9	1
FC Cincinnati	Total		24	1	0	0	1	0	0	0	25	1
FC Cincinnati 2 (loan)	2022	MLS Next Pro	6	3	—		—		—		6	3
Colorado Rapids	2023	Major League Soccer	18	1	—		1	0	2 (Note: Appearances in Leagues Cup)	0	21	1
Colorado Rapids	2024	Major League Soccer	32	3	2	0	—		7	2	41	5
Colorado Rapids	2025	Major League Soccer	2	1	0	0	—		2 (Note: Appearances in CONCACAF Champions Cup)	0	4	1
Colorado Rapids	Total		52	5	2	0	1	0	11	2	66	7
Colorado Rapids 2 (loan)	2023	MLS Next Pro	5	4	—		—		—		5	4
Career total			93	15	2	0	2	0	11	2	108	17
