= Djordje Mihailovic =

American soccer player (born 1998)

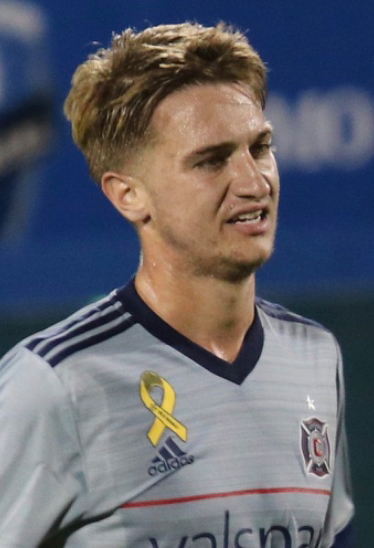
- Mihailovic with Chicago Fire in 2017

Personal information
- Full name: Djordje Aleksandar Mihailovic
- Date of birth: November 10, 1998 (age 28)
- Place of birth: Jacksonville, Florida, U.S.
- Height: 5 ft 10 in (1.78 m)
- Positions: Attacking midfielder; winger

Team information
- Current team: Toronto FC
- Number: 10

Youth career
- 2003–2013: Chicago Blast
- 2013–2017: Chicago Fire

Senior career*
| Years | Team | Apps | (Gls) |
| 2017–2020 | Chicago Fire | 73 | (7) |
| 2021–2022 | CF Montréal | 61 | (13) |
| 2023–2024 | AZ | 23 | (1) |
| 2024–2025 | Colorado Rapids | 53 | (20) |
| 2025– | Toronto FC | 29 | (7) |

International career^{‡}
| 2016–2017 | United States U19 | 6 | (3) |
| 2019–2024 | United States U23 (O.P.) | 13 | (3) |
| 2019–2023 | United States | 11 | (3) |
Medal record
Representing United States
| Runner-up | CONCACAF Gold Cup | 2019 |
- * Club domestic league appearances and goals as of November 7, 2026 ‡ National team caps and goals as of August 2, 2024

Djordje Aleksandar Mihailovic (Note: /ˈdʒɔːrdʒi mɪˈhaɪləvɪtʃ/ JOR-jee mih-HY-lə-vitch; Serbian: Ђорђе Александар Михаиловић, romanized: Đorđe Aleksandar Mihailović; Macedonian: Ѓорѓе Александар Михаиловиќ, romanized: Ǵorǵe Aleksandar Mihailoviḱ.) (born November 10, 1998) is an American professional soccer player who plays as an attacking midfielder or winger for Major League Soccer club Toronto FC.

== Club career ==
=== Early career ===
Mihailovic grew up playing for his father's club, Chicago Blast. He joined the Chicago Fire youth academy in the fall of 2013, starting with the under 16s, and moving up to the under 18s the following year. Mihailovic totaled 41 goals in 66 matches during his tenure with the academy.

=== Chicago Fire ===
The Chicago Fire signed Mihailovic as a homegrown player on January 27, 2017. The 18-year-old became the ninth Homegrown signing in Fire history and the first player born after the club's founding in 1997. He made his MLS debut on March 11, 2017, in a 2–0 home victory over Real Salt Lake. He was subbed on for Michael de Leeuw in the 93rd minute. He scored his first MLS goal on September 27, 2017, in a 4–1 away victory over the San Jose Earthquakes. His goal, assisted by Matt Polster, came in the 14th minute and was the first of the match. During the Knockout Round clash with the New York Red Bulls, Mihailovic was diagnosed with a ruptured ACL after a tackle that left him in serious pain. Mihailovic would miss 6–8 months before returning to the field.

=== CF Montréal ===
On December 17, 2020, Mihailovic was traded to CF Montréal in exchange for $400,000 in 2021 General Allocation Money, $400,000 in 2022 General Allocation Money, as well as $200,000 in conditional General Allocation Money. Mihailovic also signed a new three-year deal with Montréal. In 2021, he had 16 assists, establishing a new CF Montréal club record.

=== AZ ===
On August 24, 2022, Montréal announced a transfer had been agreed with Eredivisie side AZ for Mihailovic, effective January 1, 2023. He made his debut on January 7 against Vitesse.

=== Colorado Rapids ===
On January 8, 2024, Mihailovic returned to the United States, joining Colorado Rapids for a reported transfer fee of around $3 million. He was signed as a Designated Player due to his large transfer fee.

=== Toronto FC ===
On August 7, 2025, Mihailovic signed with Toronto FC, who paid Colorado $9 million in a cash-for-player trade. The trade included an $8 million up front and another $1 million if certain performance-based metrics were achieved.

== International career ==
As a U.S. Youth International who spent time in the U-17 Residency Program in Bradenton, Florida, Mihailovic scored three goals for the U-19s in 2016 including the game winners against Mauritania in the 2016 COTIF Tournament in Valencia, Spain on July 28 and against Hungary in the Stevan-Vilotic Cele Tournament in Topola, Serbia on September 5.

Mihailovic made his senior team debut on January 27, 2019, against Panama, where he scored his first senior international goal. Mihailovic was included on the 23 man roster for the 2019 CONCACAF Gold Cup where he made two appearances during the group stage.

== Personal life ==
As the son of former Washington Diplomats midfielder Aleksandar "Alex" Mihailović, Djordje was introduced to soccer at an early age. His sister, Aleksandra, played soccer at the University of New Mexico. He is of paternal Serbian and maternal Macedonian descent.

Mihailovic is married to Ajla. Together they have a son named Aleksi.

== Career statistics ==
=== Club ===
As of match played November 7, 2026

Appearances and goals by club, season and competition
| Club | Season | League | | | Playoffs (Note: Includes MLS Cup playoffs) | | National cup (Note: Includes U.S. Open Cup, Canadian Championship, KNVB Cup) | | Continental | | Other | | Total | |
| Club | Season | Division | Apps | Goals | Apps | Goals | Apps | Goals | Apps | Goals | Apps | Goals | Apps | Goals |
|---|---|---|---|---|---|---|---|---|---|---|---|---|---|---|
| Chicago Fire | 2017 | MLS | 17 | 1 | 1 | 0 | 1 | 0 | — | | — | | 19 | 1 |
| Chicago Fire | 2018 | MLS | 9 | 1 | — | | — | | — | | — | | 9 | 1 |
| Chicago Fire | 2019 | MLS | 27 | 3 | — | | 1 | 0 | — | | — | | 28 | 3 |
| Chicago Fire | 2020 | MLS | 20 (Note: Includes two appearances in MLS is Back Tournament group stage) | 2 | — | | — | | — | | — | | 20 | 2 |
| Chicago Fire | Total | | 73 | 7 | 1 | 0 | 2 | 0 | — | | — | | 76 | 7 |
| CF Montréal | 2021 | MLS | 34 | 4 | — | | 1 | 0 | — | | — | | 35 | 4 |
| CF Montréal | 2022 | MLS | 27 | 9 | 2 | 2 | — | | 4 (Note: Appearances in CONCACAF Champions League/Cup) | 1 | — | | 33 | 12 |
| CF Montréal | Total | | 61 | 13 | 2 | 2 | 1 | 0 | 4 | 1 | — | | 68 | 16 |
| AZ | 2022–23 | Eredivisie | 15 | 1 | — | | 1 | 0 | 4 (Note: Appearances in UEFA Conference League) | 0 | — | | 20 | 1 |
| AZ | 2023–24 | Eredivisie | 8 | 0 | — | | — | | 8 | 1 | — | | 16 | 1 |
| AZ | Total | | 23 | 1 | — | | 1 | 0 | 12 | 1 | — | | 36 | 2 |
| Colorado Rapids | 2024 | MLS | 29 | 11 | 1 | 0 | — | | — | | 6 (Note: Appearance(s) in Leagues Cup) | 1 | 36 | 12 |
| Colorado Rapids | 2025 | MLS | 24 | 9 | — | | — | | 2 | 2 | 1 | 0 | 27 | 11 |
| Colorado Rapids | Total | | 53 | 20 | 1 | 0 | — | | 2 | 2 | 7 | 1 | 63 | 23 |
| Toronto FC | 2025 | MLS | 10 | 4 | — | | — | | — | | — | | 10 | 4 |
| Toronto FC | 2026 | MLS | 19 | 3 | — | | 0 | 0 | — | | — | | 19 | 3 |
| Toronto FC | Total | | 29 | 7 | — | | 0 | 0 | — | | — | | 29 | 7 |
| Career total | | | 239 | 48 | 4 | 2 | 4 | 0 | 18 | 4 | 7 | 1 | 272 | 55 |

=== International ===
As of match played July 12, 2023

Appearances and goals by national team and year
| National team | Year | Apps | Goals |
|---|---|---|---|
| United States | 2019 | 5 | 1 |
| United States | 2020 | 1 | 0 |
| United States | 2021 | 0 | 0 |
| United States | 2022 | 0 | 0 |
| United States | 2023 | 5 | 2 |
| Total | | 11 | 3 |

Scores and results list United States' goal tally first, score column indicates score after each Mihailovic goal.

List of international goals scored by Djordje Mihailovic
| No. | Date | Venue | Opponent | Score | Result | Competition |
|---|---|---|---|---|---|---|
| 1 | January 27, 2019 | State Farm Stadium, Glendale, United States | Panama | 1–0 | 3–0 | Friendly |
| 2 | June 28, 2023 | CityPark, St. Louis, United States | Saint Kitts and Nevis | 1–0 | 6–0 | 2023 CONCACAF Gold Cup |
| 3 | June 28, 2023 | CityPark, St. Louis, United States | Saint Kitts and Nevis | 6–0 | 6–0 | 2023 CONCACAF Gold Cup |

== Honors ==
CF Montréal

- Canadian Championship: 2021
