= Order of the Serbian Flag =

Republic of Serbia order

Order of the Serbian Flag Орден српске заставе

Awarded by Republic of Serbia
- Type: State order
- Eligibility: Serbian and foreign citizens
- Awarded for: Development of international relations between Serbia and other countries
- Status: Active

Statistics
- First induction: 2009

Precedence
- Next (higher): Order of the Republic of Serbia
- Next (lower): Order of Karađorđe's Star
- 1st class; 2nd class; 3rd class; Ribbon bars of the order

Order of the Serbian Flag (Serbian: Орден српске заставе, romanized: Orden srpske zastave) is the second highest state order of Serbia. The order is awarded by the decree of the President of the Republic on special occasions, typically at the ceremonies held on the Statehood Day. It is awarded for development of international relations between the Republic of Serbia and other countries.

== Ranks ==
Order of the Serbian Flag has three classes.

1st class	2nd class	3rd class

== Notable recipients ==
=== 1st class ===
- 2024 - (Russia) Vladimir Ilyich Tolstoy
- 2023 - (Slovenia) Stanislav Hočevar
- 2023 - (Azerbaijan) Sahil Babayev
- 2023 - (United States) Richard Grenell
- 2021 - (Cyprus) Nikos Christodoulides
- 2021 - (Hungary) Péter Szijjártó
- 2021 - (Montenegro) Andrija Mandić
- 2020 - (Russia) Nikolay Aleksandrovich Mukhin
- 2019 - (Egypt) Ahmed Aboul Gheit
- 2017 - (Greece) Patriarch Theodore II of Alexandria
- 2017 - (Russia) Vitaly Churkin
- 2017 - (Egypt) Ahmed Aboul Gheit
- 2016 - (Russia) Sergey Lavrov
- 2016 - (Ethiopia) Tedros Adhanom
- 2013 - (Spain) Miguel Ángel Moratinos
- 2012 - (Russia) Georgy Poltavchenko
- 2012 - (Russia) Sergey Shoygu

=== 2nd class ===
- 2021 - (United States) Steve Stivers
- 2019 - (Russia) Alexey Miller
- 2014 - (Greece) Đorđe Mihailović
- 2014 - (Indonesia) Semuel Samson
- 2013 - (United Arab Emirates) Mohammed Dahlan

=== 3rd class ===
- 2013 - (Azerbaijan) Vagif Mustafayev
- 2012 - (France) Patrick Besson

== See also ==
- Orders, decorations and medals of Serbia
