= Oliver Larraz =

American soccer player (born 2001)

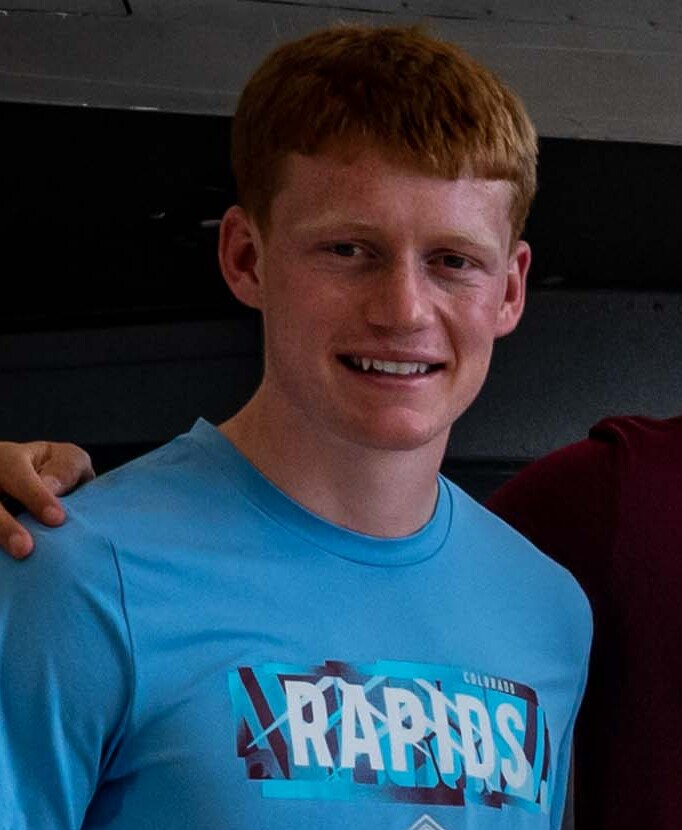
- Larraz in 2024

Personal information
- Full name: Oliver Love Larraz
- Date of birth: September 16, 2001 (age 25)
- Place of birth: Denver, Colorado, United States
- Height: 5 ft 10 in (1.78 m)
- Position: Midfielder

Team information
- Current team: Vancouver Whitecaps
- Number: 8

Youth career
- 2014–2019: Colorado Rapids
- 2019: MSV Duisburg
- 2020: Colorado Rapids

Senior career*
Years	Team	Apps	(Gls)
2021–2025	Colorado Rapids	72	(1)
2021	→ San Diego Loyal (loan)	12	(1)
2023	Colorado Rapids 2	27	(8)
2026–	Vancouver Whitecaps	23	(1)
- * Club domestic league appearances and goals as of October 13, 2026

Oliver Love Larraz (born September 16, 2001) is an American professional soccer player who plays as a midfielder for Major League Soccer club Vancouver Whitecaps.

== Career ==
Larraz joined the Colorado Rapids academy in 2014. In 2019, he featured for MSV Duisburg U-19s.

On March 3, 2021, Larraz signed with Colorado as a homegrown player. Larraz proceeded to make his competitive debut for the club on May 15, 2021, in a home match against the Houston Dynamo. He entered the match in the 90th minute as a substitute for Jack Price as Colorado won 3–1.

On August 6, 2021, Larraz joined USL Championship side San Diego Loyal on loan.

On March 15, 2022, the Colorado Rapids announced Larraz had successful surgery to repair an open fracture for his tibia. Because of the injury and subsequent recovery and rehabilitation, Larraz did not play any professional soccer during the MLS and MLS Next Pro 2022 season.

Larraz spent the 2023 season with the Rapids 2 team, scoring 8 league goals and providing 8 assists while leading Rapids 2 to the MLS Next Pro Western conference playoff finals. Larraz was selected to the MLS NEXT Pro 2023 Best XI for his efforts.

On February 24, 2024, Larraz earned his first start with the Colorado Rapids during their season opener against the Portland Timbers. Larraz quickly established himself in the starting squad under Chris Armas.

On January 15, 2026 Larraz joined the Vancouver Whitecaps as a free agent for 2 1/2 years with a club options for the 2027-2028 season.

== Career statistics ==
=== Club ===
As of December 8, 2024

Appearances and goals by club, season and competition
Club	Season	League			Playoffs		National cup		Continental		Other		Total	
Club	Season	Division	Apps	Goals	Apps	Goals	Apps	Goals	Apps	Goals	Apps	Goals	Apps	Goals
Colorado Rapids	2021	MLS	4	0	–		–		–		–		4	0
Colorado Rapids	2022	MLS	0	0	–		–		–		–		0	0
Colorado Rapids	2023	MLS	1	0	–		1	0	–		–		2	0
Colorado Rapids	2024	MLS	34	1	2	1	–		–		7 (Note: Appearances in Leagues Cup)	1	43	3
Colorado Rapids	2025	MLS	0	0	0	0	–		2 (Note: Appearances in CONCACAF Champions Cup)	0	–		2	0
Colorado Rapids	Total		39	1	2	1	1	0	2	0	7	1	51	3
San Diego Loyal SC (loan)	2021	USL	12	1	–		–		–		–		12	1
Colorado Rapids 2 (loan)	2023	MLS Next Pro	29	9	–		–		–		–		29	9
Career total			80	11	2	1	1	0	2	0	7	1	92	13
