= Boris Yeltsin Peak =

Mountain in northeastern Kyrgyzstan

- Oguz-Bashi
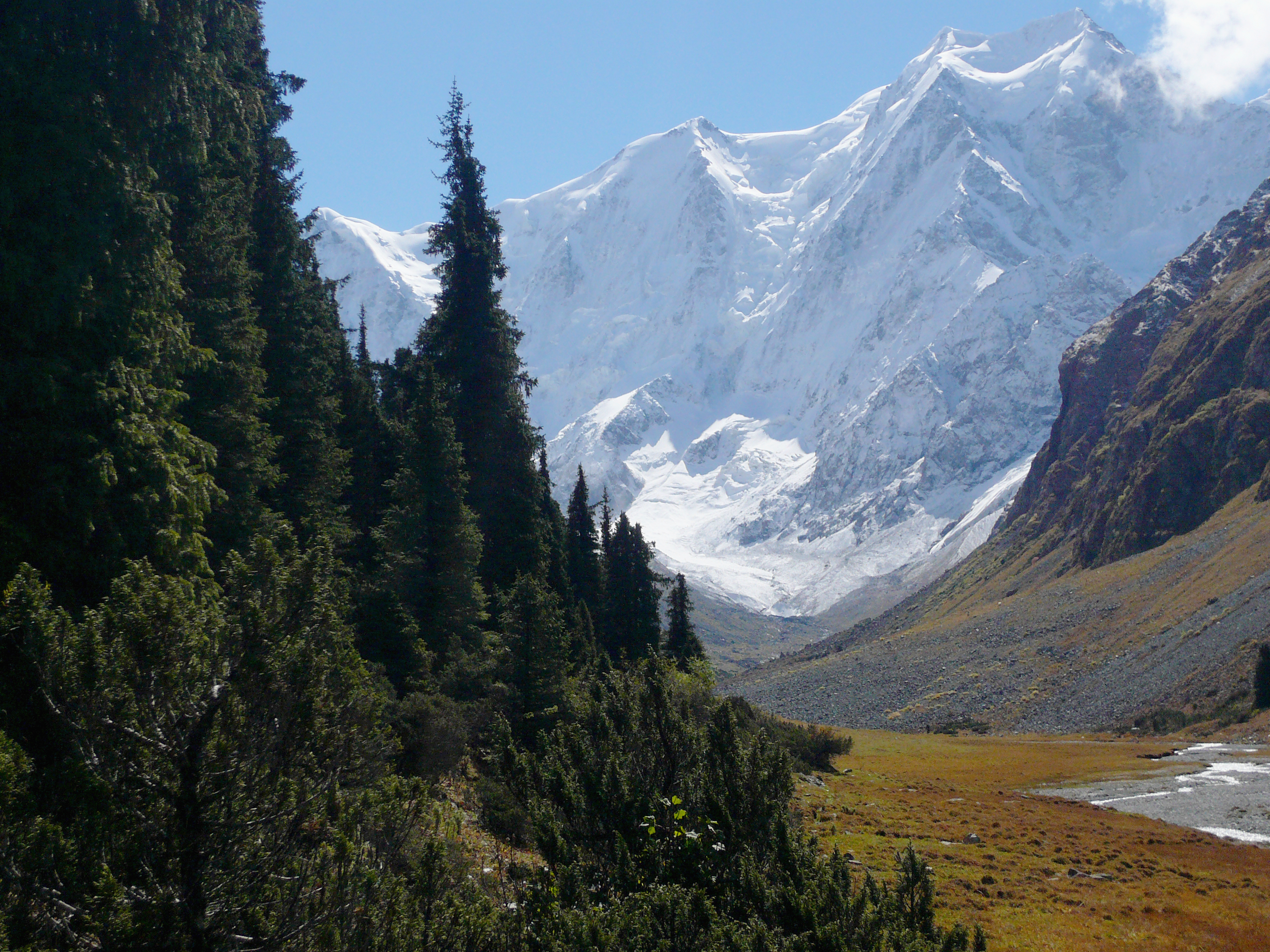

Highest point
- Elevation: 5,168 m (16,955 ft)
- Prominence: 600 m (2,000 ft)
- Coordinates: 42°09′10″N 78°23′54″E

Geography
- Location within Kyrgyzstan
- Location: Kyrgyzstan
- Parent range: Terskey Ala-too, Tian Shan

Boris Yeltsin Peak (Russian: Пик Бориса Ельцина, romanized: Pik Borisa Yel'tsina, Kyrgyz: Огуз-Баши, romanized: Oguz-Bashi) is a mountain in the Terskey Ala-too range of the Tian Shan. It is located in the Issyk-Kul Region of Kyrgyzstan. It was renamed in 2002 after the first president of Russia, Boris Yeltsin. Its previous name was Oguz-Bashi.

== See also ==
- Vladimir Putin Peak (Kyrgyzstan) - named in 2011 for the second and fourth president of the Russian Federation Vladimir Putin.
