= Rafael Navarro (footballer) =

Brazilian footballer (born 2000)

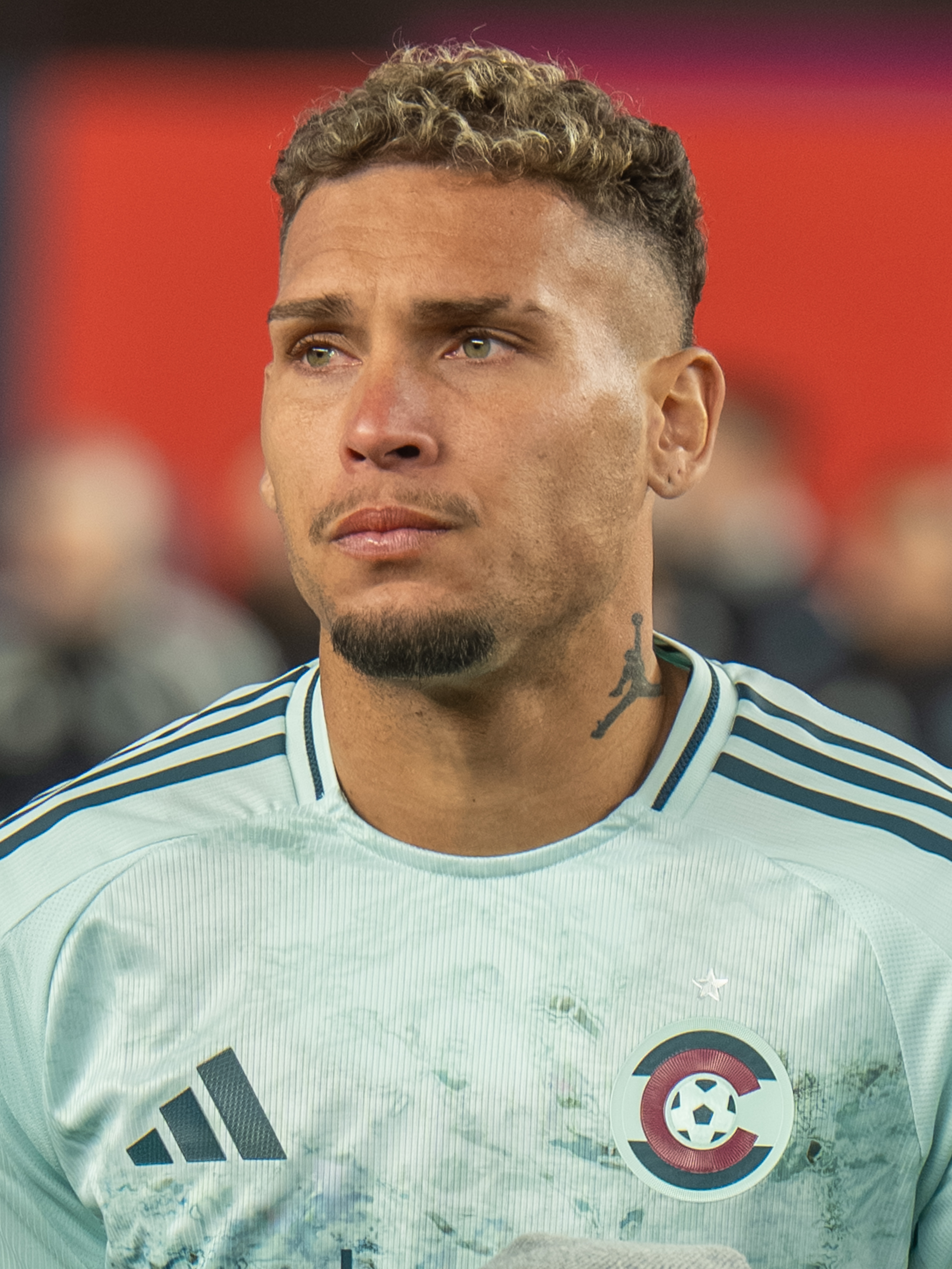
- Navarro with the Colorado Rapids in 2026

Personal information
- Full name: Rafael Navarro Leal
- Date of birth: 14 April 2000 (age 26)
- Place of birth: Cabo Frio, Brazil
- Height: 1.83 m (6 ft 0 in)
- Position: Striker

Team information
- Current team: St. Louis City
- Number: 9

Youth career
- –2017: Fluminense
- 2018–2019: Atlético Goianiense

Senior career*
| Years | Team | Apps | (Gls) |
| 2020–2021 | Botafogo | 62 | (18) |
| 2022–2024 | Palmeiras | 43 | (2) |
| 2023–2024 | → Colorado Rapids (loan) | 44 | (16) |
| 2023 | → Colorado Rapids 2 (loan) | 1 | (0) |
| 2024–2026 | Colorado Rapids | 54 | (22) |
| 2026– | St. Louis City | 6 | (7) |

International career
| 2015 | Brazil U15 | 3 | (0) |
- * Club domestic league appearances and goals as of 10:01, 12 October 2026 (UTC)

Rafael Navarro Leal (born 14 April 2000), also known simply as Rafa Navarro, is a Brazilian professional footballer who plays as a striker for Major League Soccer club St. Louis City.

== Career ==
=== Botafogo ===
Born in Cabo Frio, Rio de Janeiro state, Navarro played as a youth for Fluminense before moving to Atlético Goianiense, where he was an unused substitute in the 2019 Campeonato Brasileiro Série B. On 30 October 2019, he returned to his home state, signing for Botafogo on a two-year deal and being assigned to the under-20 team.

Navarro made his professional debut on 18 January 2020 in a 1–0 Campeonato Carioca loss away to Volta Redonda, as a 73rd-minute replacement for Lucas Campos; he made six more appearances over the season. His Série A debut came a year and a week later off the bench in a 2–0 loss at Fluminense, while his first goal was on 2 February 2021 to earn a 1–1 draw at Palmeiras. He scored again in a 5–2 loss at home to Grêmio, with his team already relegated.

In the 2021 Campeonato Brasileiro Série B, Navarro finished as third-highest scorer with 15 goals as his team won it. This included braces in wins over Náutico and Brusque towards the end of the season, both at the Estádio Olímpico Nilton Santos.

=== Palmeiras ===
On 22 December 2021, Palmeiras signed Navarro for the next five years. He played ten times in the victorious season in the Campeonato Paulista, but did not score. On 12 February 2022 he played the final 17 minutes of a 2–1 loss to Chelsea in the FIFA Club World Cup Final. In his first Copa Libertadores game for the two-times defending champions on 7 April, he came off the bench at half time to score twice in a 4–0 win at Venezuela's Deportivo Táchira; he followed it a week later with four goals in thirty minutes of an 8–1 rout of Bolivians Independiente Petrolero at the Allianz Parque.

==== Colorado Rapids (loan) ====
On 10 July 2023, Navarro signed on loan with Major League Soccer side Colorado Rapids on a year-long loan with an option to make the move permanent.

=== Colorado Rapids ===
On 27 June 2024, Navarro made a permanent move to Colorado, signing a deal until the end of 2027.

=== St. Louis City ===
On 3 September 2026, Navarro joined St. Louis City as a Designated Player for a club-record fee of $12 million, with a further $250,000 in conditional compensation.

== Career statistics ==
As of match played 30 August 2026

| Club | Season | League | | | State league (Note: Includes Campeonato Carioca, Campeonato Paulista) | | National cup (Note: Includes Copa do Brasil, U.S. Open Cup) | | Continental | | Other | | Total | |
| Club | Season | Division | Apps | Goals | Apps | Goals | Apps | Goals | Apps | Goals | Apps | Goals | Apps | Goals |
|---|---|---|---|---|---|---|---|---|---|---|---|---|---|---|
| Botafogo | 2020 | Série A | 7 | 2 | 7 | 0 | 1 | 0 | — | | — | | 15 | 2 |
| Botafogo | 2021 | Série B | 37 | 15 | 11 | 1 | 0 | 0 | — | | — | | 48 | 16 |
| Botafogo | Total | | 44 | 17 | 18 | 1 | 1 | 0 | — | | — | | 63 | 18 |
| Palmeiras | 2022 | Série A | 23 | 0 | 10 | 0 | 3 | 0 | 10 (Note: Appearances in Copa Libertadores) | 7 | 2 (Note: One appearance in FIFA Club World Cup, one appearance in Recopa Sudamericana) | 0 | 48 | 7 |
| Palmeiras | 2023 | Série A | 3 | 1 | 7 | 1 | 3 | 1 | 3 | 1 | 1 (Note: Appearances in Supercopa do Brasil) | 0 | 17 | 4 |
| Palmeiras | Total | | 26 | 1 | 17 | 1 | 6 | 1 | 13 | 8 | 3 | 0 | 65 | 11 |
| Colorado Rapids 2 (loan) | 2023 | MLS Next Pro | 1 | 0 | — | | — | | — | | — | | 1 | 0 |
| Colorado Rapids | 2023 | MLS | 10 | 1 | — | | — | | — | | — | | 10 | 1 |
| Colorado Rapids | 2024 | MLS | 34 | 15 | — | | — | | — | | 7 (Note: Appearances in Leagues Cup) | 1 | 41 | 16 |
| Colorado Rapids | 2025 | MLS | 31 | 12 | — | | — | | — | | 3 | 3 | 34 | 15 |
| Colorado Rapids | 2026 | MLS | 22 | 10 | — | | 3 | 1 | — | | — | | 25 | 11 |
| Colorado Rapids | Total | | 97 | 38 | — | | 3 | 1 | — | | 10 | 4 | 110 | 43 |
| Career total | | | 168 | 56 | 35 | 2 | 10 | 2 | 13 | 8 | 13 | 4 | 239 | 72 |

== Honours ==
Botafogo

- Campeonato Brasileiro Série B: 2021

Palmeiras

- Recopa Sudamericana: 2022
- Campeonato Paulista: 2022, 2023
- Campeonato Brasileiro Série A: 2022, 2023
- Supercopa do Brasil: 2023
- FIFA Club World Cup Runner Up: 2021
