= Cole Bassett =

American soccer player (born 2001)

- Bassett with the Portland Timbers in 2026

Personal information
- Full name: Cole John Bassett
- Date of birth: July 28, 2001 (age 25)
- Place of birth: Littleton, Colorado, U.S.
- Height: 5 ft 11 in (1.80 m)
- Position: Midfielder

Team information
- Current team: Portland Timbers
- Number: 17

Youth career
- –2017: Colorado Rush
- 2017–2018: Colorado Rapids

Senior career*
Years	Team	Apps	(Gls)
2018	Colorado Rapids U-23	4	(1)
2018–2026	Colorado Rapids	131	(29)
2019	→ Colorado Springs Switchbacks (loan)	1	(0)
2022	→ Feyenoord (loan)	8	(0)
2022	→ Fortuna Sittard (loan)	10	(0)
2026–	Portland Timbers	15	(5)

International career^{‡}
2020	United States U20	2	(2)
2023	United States U23	2	(0)
2021	United States	1	(1)
- * Club domestic league appearances and goals as of March 16, 2025 ‡ National team caps and goals as of November 29, 2023

Cole John Bassett (born July 28, 2001) is an American professional soccer player who plays as a midfielder for Major League Soccer club Portland Timbers.

== Club career ==
Born in Littleton, Colorado, Bassett joined the Colorado Rapids academy in 2017 from the Colorado Rush. A year later, on August 10, 2018, Bassett signed his first professional contract with the Rapids as a homegrown player. He proceeded to make his competitive debut for the club on September 8 against the Portland Timbers. He came on as a 71st-minute substitute for Kortne Ford as Colorado lost 2–0. He scored his first senior goal against FC Dallas on the final game of the 2018 season. In his second season, Bassett scored two goals and two assists, and was ranked No. 20 on the MLS 22 under 22 rankings of the best young players in the league. Bassett made the rankings again in 2020, this time coming in at No. 7.

Bassett enjoyed a breakout 2020 campaign. Bassett scored his first goal of 2020 on Aug 29 in a 1–1 draw against Sporting Kansas City. Bassett earned MLS Team of the Week honors in Weeks 10, 12 and 13. Bassett ended the season as Colorado's leader with five goals and five assists. Additionally, Bassett was tied for the second-highest big chance conversion rate in MLS at 80 percent. Bassett scored .92 non-penalty goals + assists per 90 minutes, which was fourth-best in MLS, and covered 11.33 km per 90 minutes, which was fifth-most in the league. At the club's annual end-of-year awards gala, Bassett was named the Players' Player of the Year, Young Player of the Year and Team MVP by Centennial 38, the Rapids' supporters group. He was also presented the Golden Boot alongside Jonathan Lewis.

Bassett scored his first goal of the 2021 MLS Season on May 8 in a 3–2 win over Minnesota United and earned MLS Team of the Week Honors (Week 4) for his performance. On May 15, 2021, Bassett scored his 10th MLS career goal in a 3–1 victory over Houston Dynamo and, in doing so, he moved into first on Colorado's all-time Homegrown goalscoring list, surpassing former teammate Dillon Serna.

In January 2022, Bassett joined Dutch club Feyenoord on a season-and-a-half long loan with an option to buy for the club.

After making an appearance in the opening game of the 2022–23 Feyenoord season, Bassett was recalled from the loan and sent on a season-long loan to another Dutch club, Fortuna Sittard on August 13, 2022. On November 18, 2022, Bassett was recalled from his loan and returned to Colorado.

On February 2, 2026, Bassett was sold to Major League Soccer side Portland Timbers for a transfer fee of $2.65 million, with potentially another $950,000 if certain performance metrics are met.

== International career ==
After a very successful 2020 Major League Campaign, Bassett received his first senior call-up to the United States men's national soccer team on November 30, 2020, ahead of a match scheduled for December 9 against El Salvador alongside teammates Sam Vines and Kellyn Acosta. He scored his first goal on December 18, 2021, against Bosnia and Herzegovina in a 1–0 win.

Bassett was again called into U.S. Men's National Team's domestic-based January Training Camp in Phoenix, Arizona in 2022.

== Career statistics ==
=== Club ===
As of December 8, 2024

Club	Season	League			National cup (Note: Includes U.S. Open Cup, KNVB Cup)		Continental		Other		Total	
Club	Season	Division	Apps	Goals	Apps	Goals	Apps	Goals	Apps	Goals	Apps	Goals
Colorado Rapids U-23	2018	PDL	4	1	–		–		1 (Note: Appearance in PDL playoffs)	0	5	1
Colorado Rapids	2018	MLS	6	1	–		–		–		6	1
Colorado Rapids	2019	MLS	20	2	1	0	–		–		21	2
Colorado Rapids	2020	MLS	14	5	–		–		1 (Note: Appearance in MLS Cup playoffs)	0	15	5
Colorado Rapids	2021	MLS	32	5	–		–		1	0	33	5
Colorado Rapids	2023	MLS	25	6	–		–		2 (Note: Appearances in Leagues Cup)	0	27	6
Colorado Rapids	2024	MLS	30	9	–		–		7	0	37	9
Colorado Rapids	2025	MLS	0	0	–		2 (Note: Appearances in CONCACAF Champions Cup)	0	–		2	0
Colorado Rapids	Total		127	28	1	0	2	0	11	0	141	28
Colorado Springs Switchbacks (loan)	2019	USL	1	0	–		–		–		1	0
Feyenoord (loan)	2021–22	Eredivisie	7	0	–		–		–		7	0
Feyenoord (loan)	2022–23	Eredivisie	1	0	–		–		–		1	0
Feyenoord (loan)	Total		8	0	–		–		–		8	0
Fortuna Sittard (loan)	2022–23	Eredivisie	10	0	1	1	–		–		11	1
Career total			150	29	2	1	2	0	12	0	166	30

=== International ===
As of December 18, 2021

United States
Year	Apps	Goals
2021	1	1
Total	1	1

International goals

Scores and results list United States' goal tally first.

No	Date	Venue	Opponent	Score	Result	Competition
1.	December 18, 2021	Dignity Health Sports Park, Carson, United States	Bosnia and Herzegovina	1–0	1–0	Friendly

== Personal ==
Bassett has a younger brother, Sam Bassett, who played soccer for the Colorado Rapids Academy and is committed to the University of Denver.
