= Reggie Cannon =

American soccer player (born 1998)

Personal information
- Full name: Reginald Jacob Cannon
- Date of birth: June 11, 1998 (age 28)
- Place of birth: Chicago, Illinois, United States
- Height: 5 ft 11 in (1.80 m)
- Position: Right-back

Team information
- Current team: Colorado Rapids
- Number: 4

Youth career
- 2015–2016: FC Dallas

College career
Years	Team	Apps	(Gls)
2016	UCLA Bruins	20	(0)

Senior career*
Years	Team	Apps	(Gls)
2017–2020	FC Dallas	67	(2)
2020–2023	Boavista	82	(0)
2023–2024	Queens Park Rangers	21	(0)
2024–	Colorado Rapids	46	(1)

International career^{‡}
2015	United States U17	2	(0)
2016	United States U19	2	(0)
2018–2022	United States	28	(1)
Medal record
Representing United States
Men's soccer
CONCACAF Gold Cup
Runner-up	2019 United States–Costa Rica–Jamaica
Winner	2021 United States
CONCACAF Nations League
Winner	2021 United States
- * Club domestic league appearances and goals as of March 12, 2026 ‡ National team caps and goals as of September 23, 2022

Reginald Jacob Cannon (born June 11, 1998) is an American professional soccer player who plays as a right-back for Major League Soccer club Colorado Rapids.

He played one year of college soccer for the UCLA Bruins in 2016 and made his Major League Soccer debut for FC Dallas the following year, totaling 75 appearances for the club. In 2020, he moved to Boavista of the Portuguese Primeira Liga for a potential fee of $3.5 million. He terminated his contract three years later due to unpaid wages, and played for Queens Park Rangers of the EFL Championship in 2023–24 before joining Colorado Rapids.

Cannon made his first appearance for the United States national team in 2018. He played at the CONCACAF Gold Cup in 2019 and 2021, winning the latter as well as the 2021 CONCACAF Nations League Finals.

== Youth and development ==
Cannon played high school soccer at Grapevine Faith Christian School in Grapevine, Texas, coached by Matt McKinney. During his freshman year Grapevine Faith won the TAPPS Division 2 Texas state championship in boys' soccer. In high school Cannon played for the FC Dallas academy team. Cannon won back-to-back national championships for FC Dallas's academy before joining University of California, Los Angeles.

Cannon played one year of college soccer at the University of California, Los Angeles in 2016, making 20 appearances for the Bruins. He was one of three players and the only freshman to appear in and start every match for the Bruins. Further, Cannon finished the year having played 1,753 minutes; playing the third most minutes on the team.

== Professional career ==
=== FC Dallas ===
Cannon left college and signed a homegrown player contract with FC Dallas on December 22, 2016. He was the 18th homegrown player in Dallas's history.

On June 14, 2017, he made his professional debut when he started in a 2–1 win over Tulsa Roughnecks in the Lamar Hunt U.S. Open Cup. Cannon made his MLS debut for the club on September 2, in a 2–2 tie at home to the New York Red Bulls, as an added-time substitute for Michael Barrios.

In the 2018 season, Cannon cemented his place as a regular starter for the team. He made his first start for the team in their first game of the season, a 1–1 tie at home to Real Salt Lake on March 4. He totalled 34 appearances, and scored once to open a 2–2 tie against Vancouver Whitecaps FC at the Toyota Stadium on May 19.

Cannon played 29 games for Dallas in the 2019 season. He scored two goals for the team, a career high for the defender.

Amidst transfer speculation, Cannon signed a new, four-year contract with a team option with the team in March 2020. He started the first two games of the season before the league went on hiatus due to the COVID-19 pandemic. His team did not take part in the subsequent season restart, MLS is Back Tournament, being forced to withdraw after ten players and one staff member tested positive for coronavirus.

=== Boavista ===
On September 9, 2020, FC Dallas announced that they had reached an agreement with Portuguese side Boavista F.C. for the transfer of Cannon in a deal worth up to $3.5 million, along with a 25–50% sell-on fee. He debuted for Boavista in the team's 2020–21 Primeira Liga opener against C.D. Nacional; the game ended in a 3–3 draw.

Cannon was sent off for the first time as a professional on November 5, 2021, in the 58th minute of a 5–2 home loss to F.C. Famalicão, for a foul on Iván Jaime. In the 2022–23 season, he was sent off two more times: in a 4–1 home loss to city rivals FC Porto, and in a 1–0 win over Gil Vicente F.C. also at the Estádio do Bessa.

In June 2023, Cannon unilaterally terminated his contract, alleging unpaid wages. Boavista chairman Vítor Murta denied the claims and said that he would go to court. In July 2025, the Court of Arbitration for Sport delivered the final judgment on the matter, awarding Cannon €400,000.

=== Queens Park Rangers ===
On September 26, 2023, Cannon officially joined English club Queens Park Rangers on a free transfer, signing a four-year deal. He played 21 games in his one season in the EFL Championship. He left the club by mutual consent on August 30, 2024.

=== Colorado Rapids ===
On September 11, 2024, Cannon was announced at Colorado Rapids on a contract until the end of the 2027 season, with an option for 2028. Eleven days later, in his second game and first start, he scored to open a 2–0 home win over Toronto FC that put his team into the 2024 MLS Cup playoffs.

== International career ==
On October 16, 2018, Cannon made his first senior appearance for the United States men's national soccer team in a friendly against Peru, which finished 1–1. He made the cut for the 2019 CONCACAF Gold Cup, due to Tyler Adams's injury, and played four matches including the 1–0 final loss to Mexico.

Cannon faced strong competition at right-back from DeAndre Yedlin and Sergiño Dest. On June 6, 2021, he came on as a substitute for the former for the second half of extra time, as the United States defeated Mexico 3–2 in the CONCACAF Nations League final. Three days later, he scored his first senior international goal in a 4–0 friendly win over Costa Rica at the Rio Tinto Stadium. He made four appearances at the 2021 CONCACAF Gold Cup, as second-choice to Shaq Moore and starting only in the 1–0 win over Mexico in the final on August 1.

Cannon was not chosen for the 2022 FIFA World Cup, as Dest, Moore, Scally, and Yedlin were selected at right-back.

== Personal life ==
Cannon is the grandson of atmospheric scientist Dr. Warren Washington. His step-sister, Bianca Smith, is a professional baseball coach.

Cannon married his wife, Kendall, in April 2020.

On August 12, 2020, Cannon spoke out against Dallas fans for booing and throwing a bottle at the players before a 0–1 loss against Nashville SC because the players knelt during the national anthem in solidarity of the Black Lives Matter movement, calling the fans' actions "disgusting". He subsequently received racist comments and death threats. Cannon said that FC Dallas prepared an apology message for him to post to fans on social media, which he refused. He said in March 2021 that he had left the United States due to his safety being "compromised" since the kneeling.

== Career statistics ==
=== Club ===
As of match played March 11, 2025

Appearances and goals by club, season and competition
Team	Season	League			National cup (Note: Includes U.S. Open Cup and Taça de Portugal)		League cup (Note: Includes MLS Cup Playoffs and Taça da Liga)		Continental		Other		Total	
Team	Season	Division	Apps	Goals	Apps	Goals	Apps	Goals	Apps	Goals	Apps	Goals	Apps	Goals
FC Dallas	2017	MLS	1	0	2	0	–		–		–		3	0
FC Dallas	2018	MLS	33	1	2	0	1	0	2 (Note: Appearances in CONCACAF Champions Cup)	0	–		38	1
FC Dallas	2019	MLS	28	1	–		1	1	–		–		29	2
FC Dallas	2020	MLS	5	0	–		–		–		–		5	0
FC Dallas	Total		67	2	4	0	2	1	2	0	–		75	3
Boavista	2020–21	Primeira Liga	31	0	2	0	–		–		–		33	0
Boavista	2021–22	Primeira Liga	21	0	1	0	1	0	–		–		23	0
Boavista	2022–23	Primeira Liga	30	0	–		3	0	–		–		33	0
Boavista	Total		82	0	3	0	4	0	–		–		89	0
Queens Park Rangers	2023–24	EFL Championship	21	0	–		–		–		–		21	0
Queens Park Rangers	Total		21	0	0	0	0	0	–		–		21	0
Colorado Rapids	2024	MLS	6	1	–		2	0	–		–		8	1
Colorado Rapids	2025	MLS	28	0	–		–		2	0	2	0	32	0
Colorado Rapids	2026	MLS	5	0	1	0							6	0
Colorado Rapids	Total		39	1	1	0	2	0	2	0	2	0	46	1
Career total			209	3	8	0	8	1	4	0	2	0	231	4

=== International ===
As of match played September 23, 2022

Appearances and goals by national team and year
National team	Year	Apps	Goals
United States	2018	2	0
United States	2019	8	0
United States	2020	3	0
United States	2021	9	1
United States	2022	6	0
Total		28	1

Scores and results list United States' goal tally first, score column indicates score after each Cannon goal.

List of international goals scored by Reggie Cannon
No.	Date	Venue	Cap	Opponent	Score	Result	Competition
1	June 9, 2021	Rio Tinto Stadium, Sandy, United States	18	Costa Rica	3–0	4–0	Friendly

== Honors ==
United States

- CONCACAF Gold Cup: 2021
- CONCACAF Nations League: 2019–20
