= Đorđe Mihailović =

Serbian cemetery keeper (1928–2023)

- Ђорђе Михаиловић
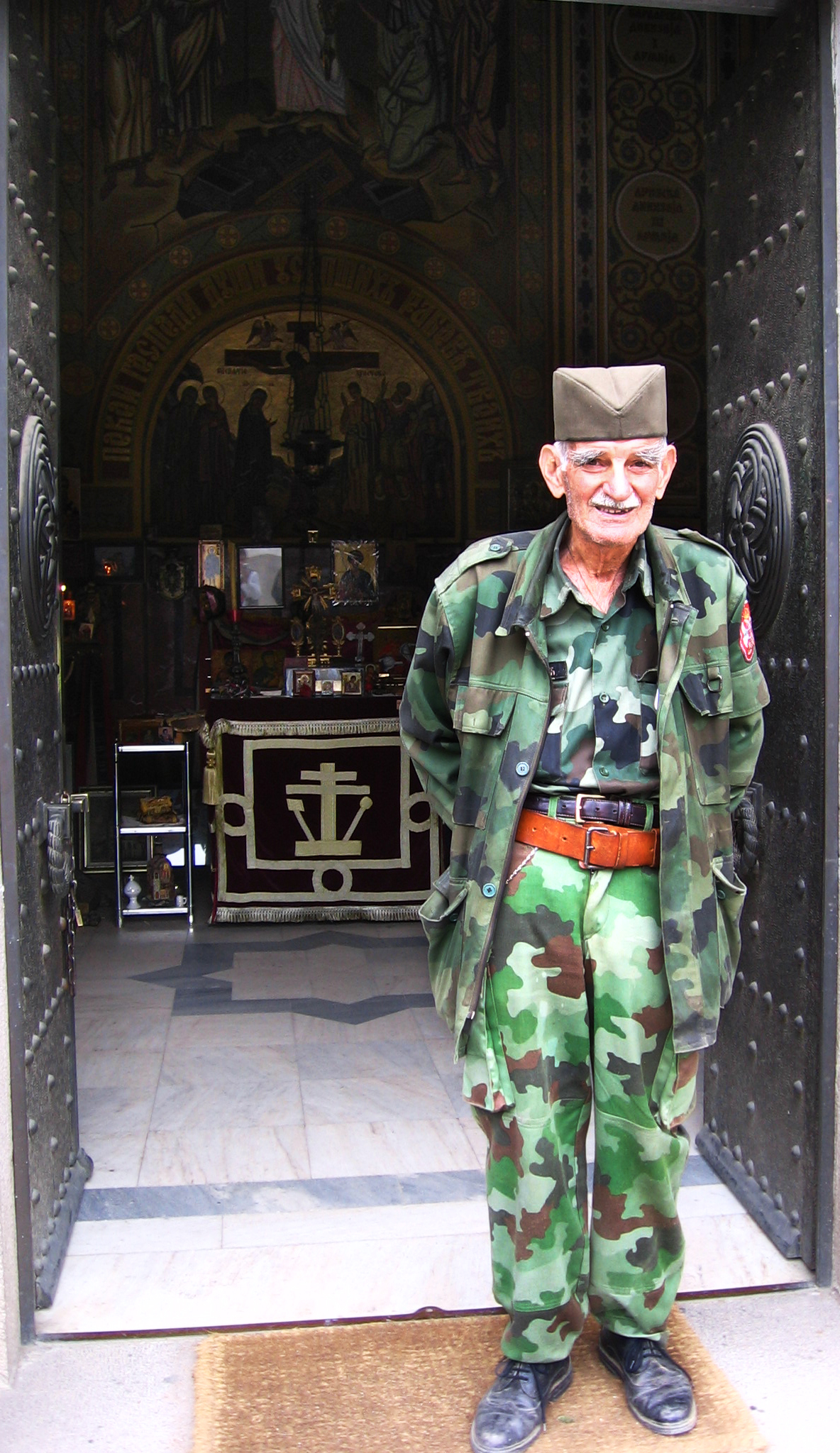
- Born: 1 May 1928; Thessaloniki, Greece
- Died: 2 July 2023 (aged 95); Thessaloniki, Greece
- Citizenship: Serbia; Greece
- Occupation: Cemetery keeper

Đorđe Mihailović (Serbian Cyrillic: Ђорђе Михаиловић; 1 May 1928 – 2 July 2023) was a keeper of the Serbian Military Cemetery at Zeitenlik, in Thessaloniki. For more than half a century Mihailović welcomed and sent off the descendants of Serbian soldiers who died on the Salonika front during the First World War.

The first keeper of the graveyard was Đorđe's grandfather, Serbian military volunteer Savo Mihailović, a Serb from Grbalj, near Boka Kotorska. Savo collected the bodies of his dead friends and comrades, and then protected and guarded the cemetery until his death in 1928. After his death, his remains were also buried in Zeitenlik. Savo was succeeded by his son Đuro Mihailović (Đorđe's father), who succeeded in preserving the cemetery and relics from Nazi looting during World War II. Đuro died in 1961 and was buried along with his father in Zeitenlik. The duty to guard the cemetery was given to Đorđe, the last male descendant of the Mihailović line. In 2020 he was awarded Serbian citizenship.

Đorđe Mihailović lived in the keeper's house with his wife and daughter. He died on 2 July 2023 in Thessaloniki, Greece, at the age of 95.

== Other ==
Raša Perić dedicated a song to the keeper of Zeitenlik, Đorđe Mihailović: "Marching all night". A documentary about Mihailović titled "The Last Guardian" was filmed in 2013.

== Awards ==
- Order of the Serbian Flag (2014)
- Mother Serbia (2021)
