= Vladimir Putin Avenue =

Prospekt in the center of Grozny

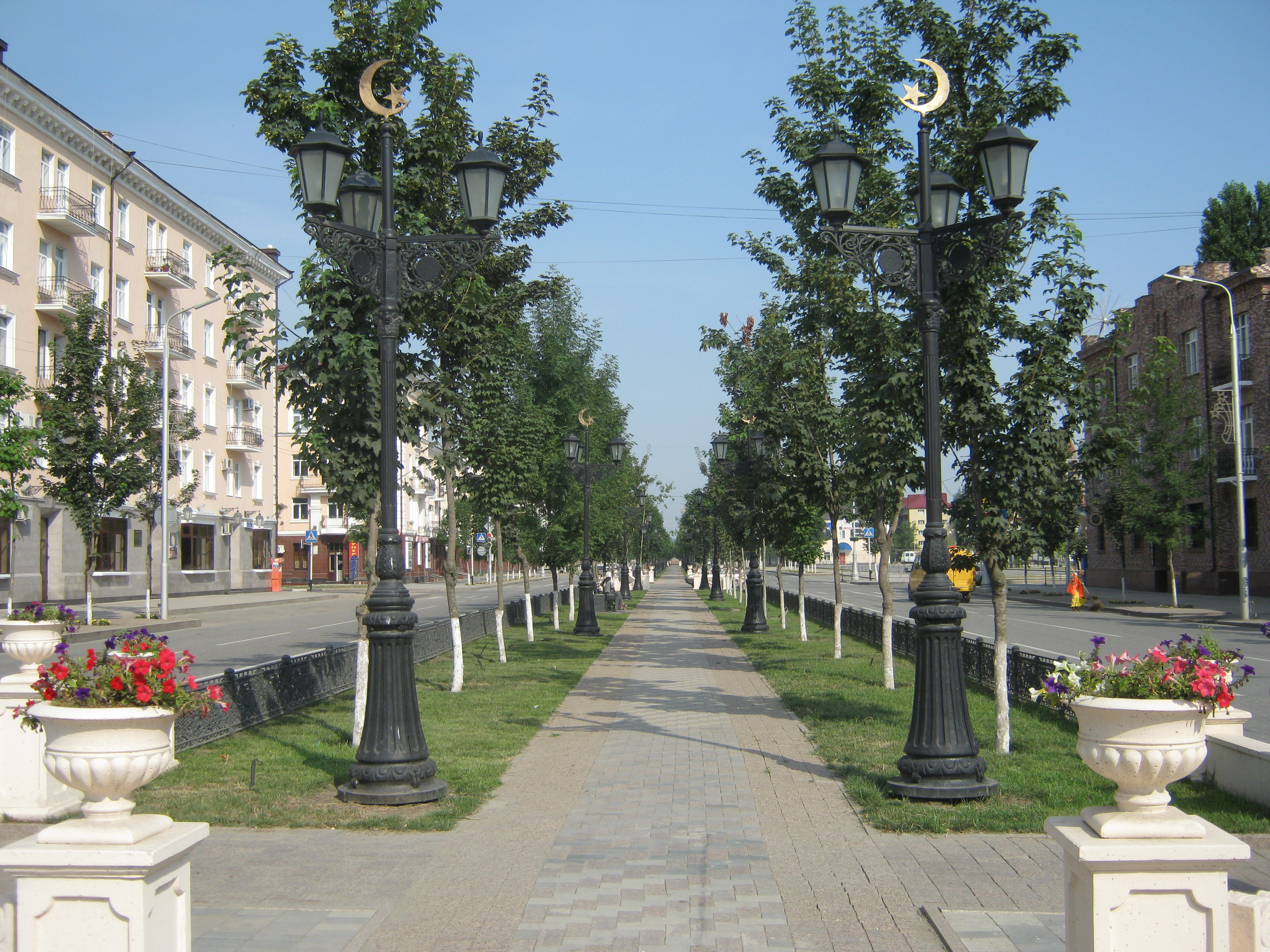
- View of the street in 2011
- Native name: Проспект Владимира Путина (Russian)
- Location: Grozny, Chechen Republic, Russia

Vladimir Putin Avenue (Russian: Проспект Владимира Путина, romanized: Prospekt Vladimira Putina), formerly Victory Avenue (Russian: Проспект Победы, romanized: Prospekt Pobedy), is a prospekt in the center of Grozny. The length of the avenue is 1880 meters. The prospekt was named by the Chechen government in honor of the President of the Russian Federation Vladimir Putin, who had a boost in popularity in Russia when he ordered the start of the Second Chechen War.

The avenue is one of the oldest streets in the city. Since its inception, the avenue has been the main city street. Currently, there are many administrative, cultural and trade institutions, including the Youth Palace, Judicial Department, National Museum of the Chechen Republic, Fashion House, Central Department Store, State Theater and Concert Hall, and Akhmad Kadyrov Mosque, all built or restored after the Battle of Grozny (1999–2000).

The building of the avenue is an example of an ensemble building in the 1950s. In addition, on the avenue are buildings that are monuments of architecture, including the Bar's house built in the early 20th century. The numbering of houses is conducted from Mayakovsky Street.

Inside the avenue there is a boulevard, in addition, several green zones border the avenue, which makes it one of the most greened streets of the city.

The opening of the prospekt after reconstruction was timed to coincide with the 420-year establishment of good-neighborly relations between Russia and Chechnya and was held on October 5, 2008. On the same day, President of the Chechen Republic Ramzan Kadyrov signed a decree renaming the Victory Avenue in Vladimir Putin's Avenue - in honor of the second President of the Russian Federation, for outstanding services in the fight against terrorism, economic recovery, social sphere of the Chechen Republic. Vladimir Putin stated that he would prefer that this no longer happen
