= Vladimir Putin Peak =

Mountain in northern Kyrgyzstan

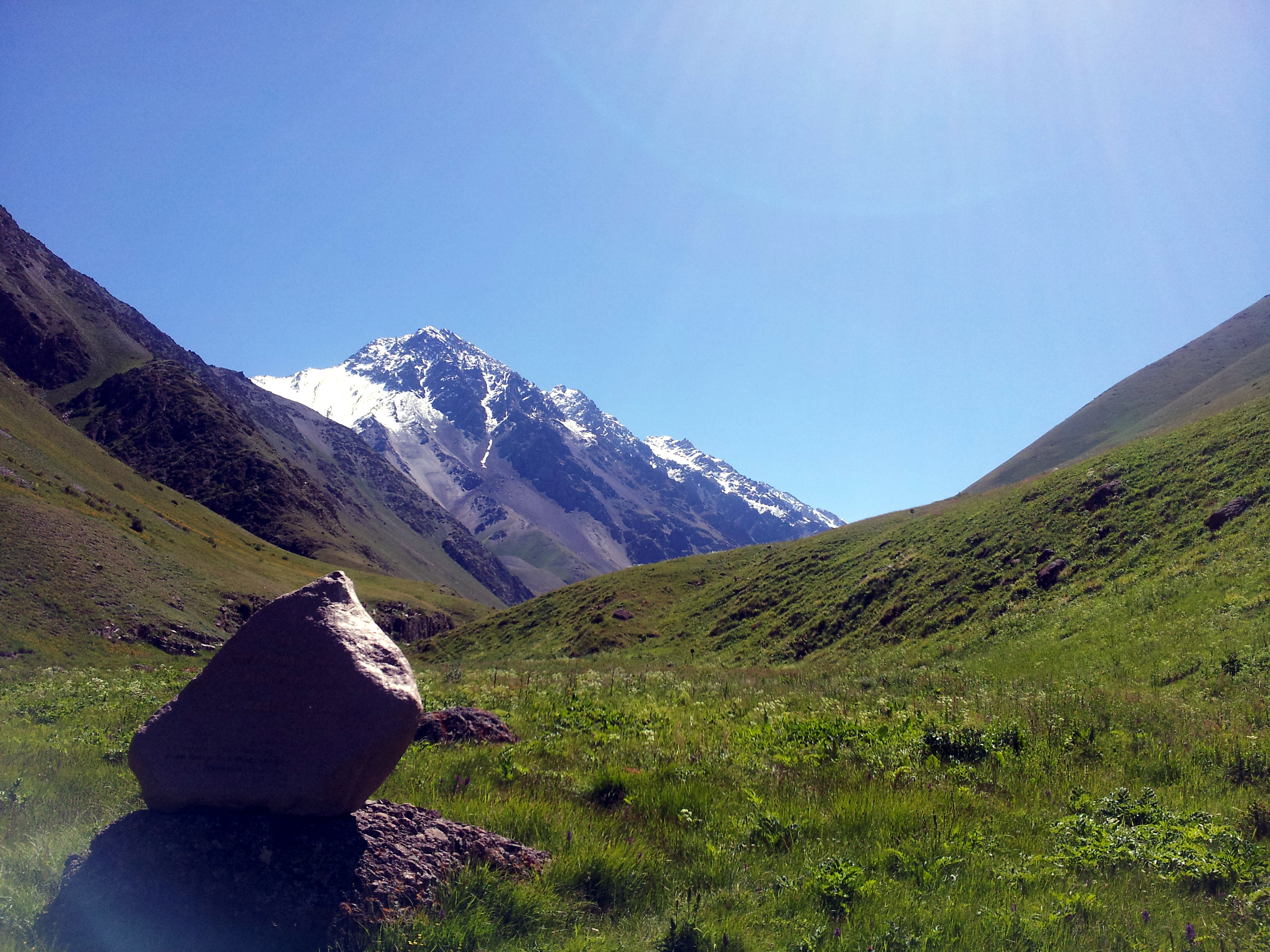

Highest point
- Elevation: 4,446 m (14,587 ft)
- Coordinates: 42°28′18″N 74°09′30″E

Geography
- Location within Kyrgyzstan
- Location: Kyrgyzstan
- Parent range: Kyrgyz Ala-Too Range, Tian Shan

Vladimir Putin Peak (Kyrgyz: Владимир Путин атындагы чоку, romanized: Vladimir Putin atındagı çoku, Russian: Пик Владимира Путина, romanized: Pik Vladimira Putina) is a mountain of the Kyrgyz Ala-Too Range mountain range in the Tian Shan system. It is located in the Chuy Region of Kyrgyzstan. It was named on 17 February 2011 after Russian president Vladimir Putin; it was previously unnamed.

== See also ==
- Boris Yeltsin Peak (Kyrgyzstan) - named in 2002 for the first president of the Russian Federation Boris Yeltsin.
