= Order of the Republic of Serbia =

Republic of Serbia order

Order of the Republic of Serbia Орден Републике Србије

Awarded by Republic of Serbia
- Type: State order
- Eligibility: Heads of state
- Awarded for: Special merits in developing international relations between Serbia and other countries, i.e. international organizations, as well as for outstanding merits in developing and strengthening peaceful cooperation and friendly relations between Serbia and other states.
- Status: Active

Statistics
- First induction: 2009

Precedence
- Next (higher): None
- Next (lower): Order of the Serbian Flag
- 1st class; 2nd class; Ribbon bars of the order

Order of the Republic of Serbia (Serbian: Орден Републике Србије, romanized: Orden Republike Srbije) is the highest state order of Serbia. The order is awarded by the decree of the President of the Republic on special occasions, typically at the ceremonies held on the Statehood Day. It is awarded for special merits in developing international relations between the Republic of Serbia and other countries, i.e. international organizations, as well as for outstanding merits in developing and strengthening peaceful cooperation and friendly relations between the Republic of Serbia and other states. It is awarded in the first class on a large necklace (heads of states), and in the second class on a ribbon (heads of states or head of governments).

== Ranks ==
Order of the Republic of Serbia has two classes.

1st class	2nd class

== Recipients ==
=== 1st class ===
- 2026 – (Kazakhstan) Kassym-Jomart Tokayev
- 2026 – (Uzbekistan) Shavkat Mirziyoyev
- 2022 – (Hungary) Viktor Orbán
- 2021 – (Bosnia and Herzegovina) Milorad Dodik
- 2021 – (Russia) Patriarch Kirill of Moscow
- 2018 – (Kazakhstan) Nursultan Nazarbayev
- 2016 – (China) Xi Jinping
- 2013 – (Russia) Vladimir Putin

=== 2nd class ===
- 2025 – (Bosnia and Herzegovina) Radovan Višković
- 2024 – (Germany) Markus Söder
- 2022 – (Egypt) Abdel Fattah el-Sisi
- 2022 – (Japan) Shinzo Abe
- 2022 – (Bosnia and Herzegovina) Željka Cvijanović
- 2021 – (Ghana) Nana Akufo-Addo
- 2021 – (Austria) Sebastian Kurz
- 2021 – (Greece) Prokopis Pavlopoulos
- 2021 – (Russia) Yury Borisov
- 2020 – (Luxembourg) Xavier Bettel
- 2020 – Albert II, Prince of Monaco
- 2020 – (Czech Republic) Miloš Zeman
- 2019 – (Bulgaria) Boyko Borisov
- 2018 – (Cyprus) Nicos Anastasiades
- 2017 – (Portugal) Marcelo Rebelo de Sousa
- 2017 – (United Arab Emirates) Mohammed bin Zayed Al Nahyan
- 2016 – (Central African Republic) Catherine Samba-Panza
- 2016 – (South Africa) Nkosazana Dlamini-Zuma
- 2016 – (Uganda) Yoweri Museveni
- 2016 – (Tunisia) Beji Caid Essebsi
- 2016 – (Sudan) Omar al-Bashir
- 2016 – (Seychelles) James Michel
- 2016 – (São Tomé and Príncipe) Manuel Pinto da Costa
- 2016 – (Rwanda) Paul Kagame
- 2016 – (Nigeria) Muhammadu Buhari
- 2016 – (Namibia) Hage Geingob
- 2016 – (Mozambique) Filipe Nyusi
- 2016 – (Mauritius) Ameenah Gurib-Fakim
- 2016 – Mohammed VI of Morocco
- 2016 – (Mali) Ibrahim Boubacar Keïta
- 2016 – (Madagascar) Hery Rajaonarimampianina
- 2016 – (Republic of the Congo) Denis Sassou Nguesso
- 2016 – (Democratic Republic of the Congo) Joseph Kabila
- 2016 – (Kenya) Uhuru Kenyatta
- 2016 – (Cameroon) Paul Biya
- 2016 – (South Sudan) Salva Kiir
- 2016 – (South Africa) Jacob Zuma
- 2016 – (Zimbabwe) Robert Mugabe
- 2016 – (Cape Verde) Jorge Carlos Fonseca
- 2016 – (Zambia) Edgar Lungu
- 2016 – (Ethiopia) Mulatu Teshome
- 2016 – (Eritrea) Isaias Afwerki
- 2016 – (Equatorial Guinea) Teodoro Obiang Nguema Mbasogo
- 2016 – (Botswana) Ian Khama
- 2016 – (Angola) José Eduardo dos Santos
- 2016 – (Algeria) Abdelaziz Bouteflika
- 2015 – (Cuba) Fidel Castro
- 2015 – (Jamaica) Portia Simpson-Miller
- 2015 – (Holy See) Pietro Parolin
- 2013 – (Venezuela) Hugo Chávez (posthumously)
- 2013 – (Armenia) Serzh Sargsyan
- 2013 – (Azerbaijan) Ilham Aliyev
- 2013 – (Belarus) Alexander Lukashenko
- 2013 – (Cyprus) Demetris Christofias
- 2013 – (Georgia (country)) Mikheil Saakashvili
- 2013 – (Greece) Karolos Papoulias
- 2013 – (Kazakhstan) Nursultan Nazarbayev
- 2013 – (Kyrgyzstan) Almazbek Atambayev
- 2013 – (Moldova) Nicolae Timofti
- 2013 – (Romania) Traian Băsescu
- 2013 – (Slovakia) Ivan Gašparovič
- 2013 – (Spain) Mariano Rajoy
- 2013 – (Tajikistan) Emomali Rahmon
- 2013 – (Turkmenistan) Gurbanguly Berdimuhamedow
- 2013 – (Ukraine) Viktor Yanukovych
- 2013 – (Uzbekistan) Islam Karimov

== See also ==
- Orders, decorations and medals of Serbia
