= Sam Bassett =

American soccer player (born 2003)

Personal information
- Full name: Sam Bassett
- Date of birth: April 13, 2003 (age 23)
- Place of birth: Wheat Ridge, Colorado, U.S.
- Height: 6 ft 0 in (1.83 m)
- Position: Midfielder

Team information
- Current team: Pittsburgh Riverhounds
- Number: 19

Youth career
- Colorado Rapids

College career
Years	Team	Apps	(Gls)
2021–2024	Denver Pioneers	77	(24)

Senior career*
Years	Team	Apps	(Gls)
2025	Colorado Rapids	15	(0)
2025	Colorado Rapids 2	16	(3)
2026–	Pittsburgh Riverhounds	26	(6)
- * Club domestic league appearances and goals as of November 7, 2026

Sam Bassett (born April 13, 2003) is an American professional soccer player who plays as a midfielder for USL Championship club Pittsburgh Riverhounds SC.

== Youth career ==
Bassett played youth football in the Colorado Rapids academy.

== College career ==
Bassett played his whole college career with the University of Denver where he started 77 games between 2021 and 2024. Bassett won the midfielder of the year award for the Summit League in 2023, and 2024, and was named to the Summit League all conference team in 2024. At one point in 2024 the Denver Post called Basset "the best player on the country’s No. 1 team".

== Club career ==
On January 7, 2025, the Colorado Rapids signed Bassett though a homegrown contract, uniting him with his brother Cole Bassett who also played for the club at the time. Bassett's contract option was declined by the club following the 2025 season. On February 21, 2026, Pittsburgh Riverhounds SC of the USL Championship announced Bassett's arrival on a one-year deal with a club option through 2027.
