= List of Major League Soccer transfers 2023 =

The following is a list of transfers for the 2023 Major League Soccer (MLS) season that have been made during the 2022–23 MLS offseason all the way through to the roster freeze.

== Transfers ==
List of 2023 MLS transfers
Date	Name	Moving from	Moving to	Mode of Transfer
October 17, 2022	(United States) Luis Zamudio	(United States) Loudoun United	D.C. United	Free
October 26, 2022	(Serbia) Nemanja Radoja	Unattached	Sporting Kansas City	Free
October 29, 2022	(United States) Sota Kitahara	(United States) Tacoma Defiance	Seattle Sounders FC	Homegrown player
November 7, 2022	(United States) Cameron Dunbar	LA Galaxy	Minnesota United FC	Trade
November 7, 2022	(United States) Aziel Jackson	Minnesota United FC	St. Louis City SC	Trade
November 7, 2022	(United States) Stiven Jimenez	D.C. United	FC Cincinnati	Trade
November 7, 2022	(United States) Jared Stroud	Austin FC	St. Louis City SC	Trade
November 9, 2022	(Canada) Luca Petrasso	Toronto FC	Orlando City SC	Trade
November 9, 2022	(Haiti) Fafà Picault	Houston Dynamo FC	Nashville SC	Trade
November 10, 2022	(Republic of Ireland) Derrick Williams	LA Galaxy	D.C. United	Trade
November 11, 2022	(United States) Jonathan Bell	New England Revolution	St. Louis City SC	Expansion Draft
November 11, 2022	(United States) Nicholas Gioacchini	Orlando City SC	St. Louis City SC	Expansion Draft
November 11, 2022	(United States) Jake LaCava	New York Red Bulls	St. Louis City SC	Expansion Draft
November 11, 2022	(United States) Jake LaCava	St. Louis City SC	Inter Miami CF	Trade
November 11, 2022	(United States) John Nelson	FC Cincinnati	St. Louis City SC	Expansion Draft
November 11, 2022	(United States) Tim Parker	Houston Dynamo FC	St. Louis City SC	Trade
November 15, 2022	(United States) Tarik Scott	(United States) FC Dallas Academy	FC Dallas	Homegrown player
November 16, 2022	(Canada) Ali Ahmed	(Canada) Whitecaps FC 2	Vancouver Whitecaps FC	Free
November 16, 2022	(United States) Nolan Norris	(United States) FC Dallas Academy	FC Dallas	Homegrown player
November 16, 2022	(Canada) Jacob Shaffelburg	Toronto FC	Nashville SC	Trade
November 17, 2022	(United States) Simon Becher	(Canada) Whitecaps FC 2	Vancouver Whitecaps FC	Free
November 17, 2022	(United States) Nimfasha Berchimas	(United States) Charlotte FC Academy	Charlotte FC	Homegrown player
November 17, 2022	(France) Sofiane Djeffal	D.C. United	Austin FC	Re-Entry Draft Stage One
November 17, 2022	(United States) Alfonso Ocampo-Chavez	Seattle Sounders FC	Austin FC	Waivers
November 17, 2022	(El Salvador) Tomas Romero	Los Angeles FC	Toronto FC	Re-Entry Draft Stage One
November 17, 2022	(United States) Akil Watts	(United States) St. Louis City 2	St. Louis City SC	Free
November 17, 2022	(Canada) Karifa Yao	CF Montréal	Vancouver Whitecaps FC	Re-Entry Draft Stage One
November 21, 2022	(Jamaica) Cory Burke	Philadelphia Union	New York Red Bulls	Free
November 21, 2022	(Portugal) Pedro Santos	Columbus Crew	D.C. United	Free
November 22, 2022	(Nigeria) Ifunanyachi Achara	Toronto FC	Houston Dynamo FC	Re-Entry Draft Stage Two
November 22, 2022	(Brazil) Artur	Columbus Crew	Houston Dynamo FC	Trade
November 22, 2022	(Canada) Michael Baldisimo	Vancouver Whitecaps FC	San Jose Earthquakes	Re-Entry Draft Stage Two
November 22, 2022	(Brazil) Felipe Martins	Austin FC	Orlando City SC	Free
November 22, 2022	(Spain) Víctor Vázquez	LA Galaxy	Toronto FC	Re-Entry Draft Stage Two
November 22, 2022	(United States) Bobby Wood	Real Salt Lake	New England Revolution	Re-Entry Draft Stage Two
November 23, 2022	(United States) Tyler Miller	Minnesota United FC	D.C. United	Free
November 23, 2022	(United States) Andrew Tarbell	Austin FC	Houston Dynamo FC	Free
November 28, 2022	(United States) Benjamin Cremaschi	(United States) Inter Miami Academy	Inter Miami CF	Homergrown player
November 28, 2022	(United States) Jake Nerwinski	Vancouver Whitecaps FC	St. Louis City SC	Free
November 28, 2022	(United States) Santiago Suárez	(United States) Sacramento Republic FC	New England Revolution	Free
November 28, 2022	(United States) Santiago Suárez	New England Revolution	(United States) New England Revolution II	Loan
November 29, 2022	(Ecuador) Alexander Alvarado	Orlando City SC	(Ecuador) L.D.U. Quito	Transfer
November 30, 2022	(Haiti) Derrick Etienne	Columbus Crew	Atlanta United FC	Free
November 30, 2022	(Honduras) Joseph Rosales	(Panama) Independiente	Minnesota United FC	Transfer
December 1, 2022	(United States) Curtis Ofori	(United States) New York Red Bulls II	New York Red Bulls	Homegrown player
December 2, 2022	(United States) Favian Loyola	(United States) Orlando City B	Orlando City SC	Homegrown player
December 2, 2022	(Portugal) João Moutinho	Orlando City SC	(Italy) Spezia	Free
December 5, 2022	(Brazil) Evander	(Denmark) Midtjylland	Portland Timbers	Transfer
December 5, 2022	(United States) Sebastien Ibeagha	Los Angeles FC	FC Dallas	Free
December 5, 2022	(United States) Drew Skundrich	D.C. United	(United States) Colorado Springs Switchbacks FC	Free
December 6, 2022	(United States) Clint Irwin	Colorado Rapids	Minnesota United FC	Free
December 6, 2022	(United States) Andrés Perea	Orlando City SC	Philadelphia Union	Trade
December 7, 2022	(Iraq) Mohanad Jeahze	(Sweden) Hammarby IF	D.C. United	Transfer
December 8, 2022	(France) Kévin Cabral	LA Galaxy	Colorado Rapids	Trade
December 8, 2022	(Puerto Rico) Zarek Valentin	Houston Dynamo FC	Minnesota United FC	Free
December 12, 2022	(Canada) Doneil Henry	Toronto FC	Minnesota United FC	Waivers
December 12, 2022	(Canada) Tyler Pasher	New York Red Bulls	(United States) Birmingham Legion FC	Free
December 12, 2022	(United States) Gyasi Zardes	Colorado Rapids	Austin FC	Free
December 13, 2022	(United States) George Campbell	Atlanta United FC	CF Montréal	Trade
December 13, 2022	(United States) Jacob Castro	(United States) San Diego State Aztecs	Seattle Sounders FC	Homegrown player
December 14, 2022	(United States) Alex Bono	Toronto FC	D.C. United	Free
December 15, 2022	(United States) Sam Adeniran	Seattle Sounders FC	St. Louis City SC	Trade
December 15, 2022	(Canada) Derek Cornelius	Vancouver Whitecaps FC	(Sweden) Malmö FF	Transfer
December 19, 2022	(United States) Matt Hedges	FC Dallas	Toronto FC	Free
December 20, 2022	(Uruguay) Nicolás Acevedo	New York City FC	(Brazil) Bahia	Loan
December 21, 2022	(United States) Joey Akpunonu	(United States) Bowling Green Falcons	FC Cincinnati	SuperDraft
December 21, 2022	(Ecuador) Marco Angulo	(Ecuador) Independiente del Valle	FC Cincinnati	Transfer
December 21, 2022	(Haiti) Charles Auguste	(United States) Creighton Bluejays	Houston Dynamo FC	Free
December 21, 2022	(Ghana) Joshua Bolma	(United States) Maryland Terrapins	New England Revolution	SuperDraft
December 21, 2022	(Canada) Moïse Bombito	(United States) New Hampshire Wildcats	Colorado Rapids	SuperDraft
December 21, 2022	(Canada) Brandon Cambridge	(United States) Portland Pilots	Charlotte FC	Homegrown player
December 21, 2022	(Senegal) Hamady Diop	(United States) Clemson Tigers	Charlotte FC	SuperDraft
December 21, 2022	(United States) CJ Fodrey	(United States) San Diego State Aztecs	Austin FC	SuperDraft
December 21, 2022	(England) Calvin Harris	FC Cincinnati	Colorado Rapids	Trade
December 21, 2022	(United States) Aaron Herrera	Real Salt Lake	CF Montréal	Trade
December 21, 2022	(France) Bertin Jacquesson	(United States) Pittsburgh Panthers	Real Salt Lake	SuperDraft
December 21, 2022	(Ghana) Shak Mohammed	(United States) Duke Blue Devils	Orlando City SC	SuperDraft
December 21, 2022	(Cameroon) J.C. Ngando	(United States) UNC Greensboro Spartans	Vancouver Whitecaps FC	SuperDraft
December 21, 2022	(United States) Owen O'Malley	(United States) Creighton Bluejays	St. Louis City SC	SuperDraft
December 21, 2022	(United States) Ilijah Paul	(United States) Washington Huskies	Real Salt Lake	SuperDraft
December 21, 2022	(United States) Jayden Reid	(United States) Connecticut Huskies	New York Red Bulls	Homegrown player
December 21, 2022	(Brazil) Ruan	Orlando City SC	D.C. United	Trade
December 21, 2022	(United States) Joey Skinner	(United States) Clemson Tigers	Nashville SC	SuperDraft
December 22, 2022	(Mexico) Tony Alfaro	D.C. United	New York City FC	Free
December 22, 2022	(Brazil) Geovane Jesus	(Brazil) Cruzeiro	FC Dallas	Transfer
December 22, 2022	(Honduras) Denil Maldonado	(Honduras) Motagua	Los Angeles FC	Loan
December 22, 2022	(England) Laurence Wyke	(United States) Tampa Bay Rowdies	Nashville SC	Free
December 23, 2022	(South Africa) Njabulo Blom	(South Africa) Kaizer Chiefs	St. Louis City SC	Transfer
December 23, 2022	(United States) Freddy Kleemann	Austin FC	(United States) Tampa Bay Rowdies	Free
December 23, 2022	(Colombia) Jimmy Medranda	Seattle Sounders FC	Columbus Crew	Free
December 23, 2022	(Argentina) Maxi Moralez	New York City FC	(Argentina) Racing Club	Transfer
December 23, 2022	(United States) Quentin Westberg	Toronto FC	Atlanta United FC	Free
December 26, 2022	(Mexico) Daniel Ríos	Charlotte FC	(Mexico) Guadalajara	Transfer
December 27, 2022	(Switzerland) Maren Haile-Selassie	(Switzerland) FC Lugano	Chicago Fire FC	Loan
December 29, 2022	(Brazil) Héber	New York City FC	Seattle Sounders FC	Trade
December 29, 2022	(United States) Ben Mines	FC Cincinnati	(United States) Miami FC	Free
December 30, 2022	(Croatia) Stipe Biuk	(Croatia) Hajduk Split	Los Angeles FC	Transfer
January 1, 2023	(United States) Paxten Aaronson	Philadelphia Union	(Germany) Eintracht Frankfurt	Transfer
January 1, 2023	(Ecuador) Jordy Alcívar	Charlotte FC	(Ecuador) Independiente del Valle	Transfer
January 1, 2023	(Sweden) Rasmus Alm	(Sweden) IF Elfsborg	St. Louis City SC	Free
January 1, 2023	(Canada) Max Anchor	(Canada) Whitecaps FC 2	Vancouver Whitecaps FC	Homegrown player
January 1, 2023	(Ecuador) Jhon Espinoza	Chicago Fire FC	(Switzerland) FC Lugano	Free
January 1, 2023	(Canada) Alistair Johnston	CF Montréal	(Scotland) Celtic	Transfer
January 1, 2023	(Canada) Ismaël Koné	CF Montréal	(England) Watford	Transfer
January 1, 2023	(United States) Djordje Mihailovic	CF Montréal	(Netherlands) AZ	Transfer
January 1, 2023	(Colombia) José Mulato	(Colombia) Deportivo Cali	FC Dallas	Transfer
January 1, 2023	(Sweden) Anton Tinnerholm	New York City FC	(Sweden) Malmö FF	Free
January 1, 2023	(Brazil) Júnior Urso	Orlando City SC	(Brazil) Coritiba	Free
January 1, 2023	(Ghana) Joshua Yaro	(United States) St. Louis City 2	St. Louis City SC	Free
January 2, 2023	(Italy) Domenico Criscito	Toronto FC	(Italy) Genoa	Free
January 3, 2023	(United States) Matt Bersano	San Jose Earthquakes	Austin FC	Free
January 3, 2023	(Ghana) Latif Blessing	Los Angeles FC	New England Revolution	Trade
January 3, 2023	(United States) Tyler Freeman	(United States) Loudoun United	Nashville SC	Free
January 3, 2023	(Mexico) Richard Sánchez	LA Galaxy	(United States) Hartford Athletic	Free
January 4, 2023	(Slovenia) Mitja Ilenič	(Slovenia) NK Domžale	New York City FC	Transfer
January 4, 2023	(United States) Aaron Long	New York Red Bulls	Los Angeles FC	Free
January 4, 2023	(Argentina) Marcelino Moreno	Atlanta United FC	(Brazil) Coritiba	Loan
January 4, 2023	(Libya) Ismael Tajouri-Shradi	New England Revolution	(Cyprus) Omonia	Free
January 4, 2023	(Finland) Leo Väisänen	(Sweden) IF Elfsborg	Austin FC	Transfer
January 5, 2023	(United States) Nick DePuy	LA Galaxy	Nashville SC	Trade
January 5, 2023	(United States) Isaiah Foster	(United States) Colorado Springs Switchbacks FC	FC Cincinnati	Waivers
January 5, 2023	(Argentina) Alan Franco	Atlanta United FC	(Brazil) São Paulo	Transfer
January 5, 2023	(Norway) Ruben Gabrielsen	Austin FC	(Norway) Lillestrøm SK	Transfer
January 5, 2023	(United States) Christopher Garcia	Real Salt Lake	(United States) El Paso Locomotive FC	Free
January 5, 2023	(Democratic Republic of the Congo) Chris Mavinga	Toronto FC	LA Galaxy	Free
January 5, 2023	(United States) Memo Rodríguez	Houston Dynamo FC	LA Galaxy	Free
January 5, 2023	(United States) Dave Romney	Nashville SC	New England Revolution	Trade
January 5, 2023	(Brazil) Rafael Santos	(Brazil) Cruzeiro	Orlando City SC	Transfer
January 5, 2023	(Argentina) Nicolás Stefanelli	(Sweden) AIK	Inter Miami CF	Transfer
January 6, 2023	(Ivory Coast) Aké Loba	Nashville SC	(Mexico) Mazatlán	Loan
January 6, 2023	(Germany) Ben Lundt	(United States) Phoenix Rising FC	St. Louis City SC	Transfer
January 6, 2023	(Brazil) Elias Manoel	(Brazil) Grêmio	New York Red Bulls	Transfer
January 6, 2023	(United States) Ben Martino	(United States) Virginia Tech Hokies	Nashville SC	Homegrown player
January 6, 2023	(United States) Benji Michel	Orlando City SC	(Portugal) Arouca	Free
January 6, 2023	(Haiti) Delentz Pierre	(United States) Portland Pilots	Real Salt Lake	Homegrown player
January 6, 2023	(United States) Malik Pinto	(United States) Princeton Tigers	FC Cincinnati	Free
January 6, 2023	(Argentina) Tomás Pochettino	Austin FC	(Brazil) Fortaleza	Transfer
January 6, 2023	(United States) Luis Rivera	(United States) Real Monarchs	Real Salt Lake	Homegrown player
January 6, 2023	(Australia) Brad Smith	D.C. United	Houston Dynamo FC	Free
January 7, 2023	(United States) Cam Cilley	(United States) Stanford Cardinal	San Jose Earthquakes	Homegrown player
January 7, 2023	(Paraguay) Iván Franco	(Paraguay) Libertad	Houston Dynamo FC	Loan
January 7, 2023	(Argentina) Martín Ojeda	(Argentina) Godoy Cruz	Orlando City SC	Transfer
January 7, 2023	(United States) Keegan Tingey	(United States) Stanford Cardinal	San Jose Earthquakes	Homegrown player
January 7, 2023	(England) Ashley Westwood	(England) Burnley	Charlotte FC	Free
January 9, 2023	(United States) Caden Glover	(United States) St. Louis City 2	St. Louis City SC	Homegrown player
January 9, 2023	(Switzerland) Eldin Jakupović	(England) Everton	Los Angeles FC	Transfer
January 9, 2023	(Uruguay) Mathías Laborda	(Uruguay) Nacional	Vancouver Whitecaps FC	Free
January 9, 2023	(Ecuador) Sebas Méndez	Los Angeles FC	(Brazil) São Paulo	Free
January 9, 2023	(United States) Nebiyou Perry	(Sweden) Östersunds FK	Nashville SC	Free
January 9, 2023	(France) Arnaud Souquet	(France) Montpellier	Chicago Fire FC	Free
January 9, 2023	(Argentina) Matías Vera	Houston Dynamo FC	(Argentina) Argentinos Juniors	Loan
January 10, 2023	(Colombia) Andrés Gómez	(Colombia) Millonarios	Real Salt Lake	Transfer
January 10, 2023	(United States) Amet Korça	(Croatia) HNK Gorica	FC Dallas	Transfer
January 10, 2023	(Sweden) Adam Lundkvist	Houston Dynamo FC	Austin FC	Trade
January 10, 2023	(United States) Jack Panayotou	(United States) Georgetown Hoyas	New England Revolution	Homegrown player
January 10, 2023	(United States) Gabriel Segal	(Germany) 1. FC Köln II	New York City FC	Waivers
January 11, 2023	(Somalia) Handwalla Bwana	Nashville SC	(United States) Charleston Battery	Free
January 11, 2023	(Argentina) Enzo Copetti	(Argentina) Racing Club	Charlotte FC	Transfer
January 11, 2023	(Senegal) Clément Diop	New England Revolution	Atlanta United FC	Free
January 11, 2023	(United States) Jeff Gal	(Sweden) Degerfors IF	Chicago Fire FC	Free
January 11, 2023	(Denmark) Niko Hansen	Minnesota United FC	(United States) San Antonio FC	Free
January 11, 2023	(United States) Keegan Hughes	(United States) Stanford Cardinal	Columbus Crew	Homegrown player
January 11, 2023	(Argentina) Franco Negri	(Argentina) Godoy Cruz	Inter Miami CF	Transfer
January 12, 2023	(United States) Jonathan Dean	(United States) Birmingham Legion FC	Chicago Fire FC	Transfer
January 12, 2023	(Norway) Adama Diomande	(Norway) Odds BK	Toronto FC	Waivers
January 12, 2023	(United States) Kalil ElMedkhar	FC Dallas	(United States) Loudoun United	Free
January 12, 2023	(Argentina) Franco Escobar	Los Angeles FC	Houston Dynamo FC	Free
January 12, 2023	(South Sudan) Ryen Jiba	(United States) Union Omaha	Minnesota United FC	SuperDraft
January 12, 2023	(Poland) Mateusz Klich	(England) Leeds United	D.C. United	Transfer
January 12, 2023	(Germany) Tim Leibold	(Germany) Hamburger SV	Sporting Kansas City	Transfer
January 12, 2023	(England) Kimarni Smith	D.C. United	(United States) San Antonio FC	Free
January 13, 2023	(United States) Danny Flores	(United States) Virginia Tech Hokies	Sporting Kansas City	Waivers
January 13, 2023	(Greece) Ilias Iliadis	(Greece) Panathinaikos B	CF Montréal	Transfer
January 13, 2023	(Uganda) Edward Kizza	New England Revolution	(United States) Pittsburgh Riverhounds SC	Free
January 13, 2023	(United States) Eddie Munjoma	FC Dallas	(United States) Phoenix Rising FC	Free
January 13, 2023	(United States) Koa Santos	Charlotte FC	(United States) Loudoun United	Free
January 14, 2023	(United States) Zach Ryan	New York Red Bulls	(United States) Loudoun United	Free
January 14, 2023	(United States) Peter Stroud	(United States) Duke Blue Devils	New York Red Bulls	Homegrown player
January 15, 2023	(United States) Kyle Duncan	(Belgium) KV Oostende	New York Red Bulls	Loan
January 17, 2023	(Colombia) Jhon Durán	Chicago Fire FC	(England) Aston Villa	Transfer
January 17, 2023	(United States) Indiana Vassilev	(England) Aston Villa	St. Louis City SC	Transfer
January 17, 2023	(United States) Adrian Zendejas	Charlotte FC	(United States) Miami FC	Loan
January 18, 2023	(United States) Joe Corona	Houston Dynamo FC	(United States) San Diego Loyal SC	Free
January 18, 2023	(Venezuela) Josef Martínez	Atlanta United FC	Inter Miami CF	Free
January 18, 2023	(Republic of Ireland) Jake Mulraney	Orlando City SC	(Republic of Ireland) St Patrick's Athletic	Transfer
January 19, 2023	(Canada) Marcus Godinho	Vancouver Whitecaps FC	(Poland) Korona Kielce	Free
January 19, 2023	(Somalia) Siad Haji	San Jose Earthquakes	(United States) FC Tulsa	Free
January 19, 2023	(United States) Christian Ramírez	(Scotland) Aberdeen	Columbus Crew	Transfer
January 19, 2023	(United States) Cole Turner	Philadelphia Union	(United States) Loudoun United	Free
January 20, 2023	(Ecuador) Leo Campana	(England) Wolverhampton Wanderers	Inter Miami CF	Transfer
January 20, 2023	(United States) Kaveh Rad	Sporting Kansas City	(United States) Hartford Athletic	Free
January 20, 2023	(United States) Paul Walters	(United States) Northwestern Wildcats	FC Cincinnati	Homegrown player
January 20, 2023	(United States) Bryce Washington	Atlanta United FC	(United States) Loudoun United	Free
January 21, 2023	(Brazil) Daniel	(Brazil) Internacional	San Jose Earthquakes	Transfer
January 23, 2023	(Morocco) Amine Bassi	(France) Metz	Houston Dynamo FC	Transfer
January 23, 2023	(Peru) Alexander Callens	New York City FC	(Spain) Girona	Free
January 23, 2023	(France) Samuel Grandsir	LA Galaxy	(France) Le Havre	Transfer
January 23, 2023	(Sweden) Mikael Marqués	(Sweden) AFC Eskilstuna	Minnesota United FC	Transfer
January 23, 2023	(Republic of Ireland) Connor Ronan	(England) Wolverhampton Wanderers	Colorado Rapids	Transfer
January 24, 2023	(United States) Blake Bodily	Portland Timbers	(United States) San Diego Loyal SC	Free
January 24, 2023	(Costa Rica) Rónald Matarrita	FC Cincinnati	(Ukraine) Dnipro-1	Free
January 24, 2023	(Italy) Raoul Petretta	(Turkey) Kasımpaşa	Toronto FC	Transfer
January 25, 2023	(Jamaica) Damion Lowe	Inter Miami CF	Philadelphia Union	Trade
January 26, 2023	(United States) Daniel Crisostomo	(United States) Las Vegas Lights FC	Los Angeles FC	Free
January 26, 2023	(Argentina) Ramiro Enrique	(Argentina) Banfield	Orlando City SC	Transfer
January 26, 2023	(United States) Cal Jennings	Los Angeles FC	(United States) Tampa Bay Rowdies	Free
January 26, 2023	(Mexico) Abraham Romero	(United States) Las Vegas Lights FC	Los Angeles FC	Free
January 26, 2023	(Argentina) Joaquín Torres	CF Montréal	Philadelphia Union	Trade
January 26, 2023	(Mexico) Danny Trejo	Los Angeles FC	(United States) Phoenix Rising FC	Free
January 27, 2023	(United States) Matt Freese	Philadelphia Union	New York City FC	Trade
January 27, 2023	(United States) Sean Johnson	New York City FC	Toronto FC	Free
January 27, 2023	(Denmark) Andreas Maxsø	(Denmark) Brøndby IF	Colorado Rapids	Transfer
January 27, 2023	(Colombia) Emerson Rodríguez	Inter Miami CF	(Mexico) Santos Laguna	Loan
January 27, 2023	(Egypt) Amro Tarek	(Egypt) Al Masry	Austin FC	Free
January 30, 2023	(Australia) Alex Gersbach	(France) Grenoble	Colorado Rapids	Transfer
January 30, 2023	(Poland) Patryk Klimala	New York Red Bulls	(Israel) Hapoel Be'er Sheva	Transfer
January 31, 2023	(Senegal) Moussa Djitté	Austin FC	(France) AC Ajaccio	Loan
January 31, 2023	(Ecuador) Carlos Gruezo	(Germany) FC Augsburg	San Jose Earthquakes	Transfer
January 31, 2023	(Ukraine) Sergii Kryvtsov	(Ukraine) Shakhtar Donetsk	Inter Miami CF	Transfer
January 31, 2023	(Iceland) Dagur Dan Þórhallsson	(Iceland) Breiðablik	Orlando City SC	Transfer
January 31, 2023	(United States) Gedion Zelalem	New York City FC	(Netherlands) FC Den Bosch	Free
February 1, 2023	(Colombia) Cristian Arango	Los Angeles FC	(Mexico) Pachuca	Transfer
February 1, 2023	(Canada) Lucas Cavallini	Vancouver Whitecaps FC	(Mexico) Tijuana	Free
February 1, 2023	(Burundi) Irakoze Donasiyano	Nashville SC	(United States) Oakland Roots SC	Free
February 2, 2023	(Peru) Luis Abram	(Spain) Granada	Atlanta United FC	Transfer
February 2, 2023	(Colombia) Edwin Mosquera	Atlanta United FC	(Argentina) Defensa y Justicia	Loan
February 2, 2023	(Colombia) Yerson Mosquera	(England) Wolverhampton Wanderers	FC Cincinnati	Loan
February 2, 2023	(Mexico) Jaziel Orozco	Real Salt Lake	(Mexico) Santos Laguna	Loan
February 2, 2023	(Spain) Sergi Palencia	(France) AS Saint-Étienne	Los Angeles FC	Transfer
February 3, 2023	(Argentina) Braian Cufré	(Spain) Mallorca	New York City FC	Loan
February 3, 2023	(Belgium) Dante Vanzeir	(Belgium) Union SG	New York Red Bulls	Transfer
February 7, 2023	(Panama) Carlos Harvey	LA Galaxy	(United States) Phoenix Rising FC	Transfer
February 7, 2023	(Argentina) Jonathan Menéndez	Real Salt Lake	(Argentina) Newell's Old Boys	Loan
February 7, 2023	(Norway) Sigurd Rosted	(Denmark) Brøndby IF	Toronto FC	Transfer
February 8, 2023	(Greece) Giorgos Giakoumakis	(Scotland) Celtic	Atlanta United FC	Transfer
February 8, 2023	(Canada) Jayden Nelson	Toronto FC	(Norway) Rosenborg	Transfer
February 8, 2023	(United States) Philip Quinton	(United States) Columbus Crew 2	Columbus Crew	Free
February 8, 2023	(United States) Harrison Robledo	FC Cincinnati	(United States) Indy Eleven	Loan
February 8, 2023	(Mexico) Miguel Tapias	(Mexico) Pachuca	Minnesota United FC	Free
February 9, 2023	(Colombia) Santiago Arias	(Spain) Atlético Madrid	FC Cincinnati	Free
February 9, 2023	(Netherlands) Djevencio van der Kust	(Netherlands) FC Utrecht	Houston Dynamo FC	Loan
February 10, 2023	(United States) Will Bruin	Seattle Sounders FC	Austin FC	Free
February 10, 2023	(Ghana) Jonathan Mensah	Columbus Crew	San Jose Earthquakes	Trade
February 10, 2023	(United States) Chris Rindov	(United States) Maryland Terrapins	Sporting Kansas City	SuperDraft
February 10, 2023	(Germany) Timothy Tillman	(Germany) Greuther Fürth	Los Angeles FC	Transfer
February 11, 2023	(Guinea-Bissau) Janio Bikel	Vancouver Whitecaps FC	(Russia) FC Khimki	Free
February 11, 2023	(Canada) Jules-Anthony Vilsaint	(Belgium) Antwerp	CF Montréal	Transfer
February 13, 2023	(Colombia) Brayan Vera	(Colombia) América de Cali	Real Salt Lake	Transfer
February 14, 2023	(Somalia) Abdi Salim	(United States) Syracuse Orange	Orlando City SC	SuperDraft
February 15, 2023	(Canada) Jean-Aniel Assi	CF Montréal	(Canada) Atlético Ottawa	Loan
February 15, 2023	(United States) Herbert Endeley	(United States) Indiana Hoosiers	FC Dallas	SuperDraft
February 16, 2023	(Haiti) Shanyder Borgelin	(United States) Inter Miami CF II	Inter Miami CF	Homegrown player
February 16, 2023	(United States) Nick Markanich	FC Cincinnati	(United States) Charleston Battery	Free
February 16, 2023	(Brazil) Micael	(Brazil) Atlético Mineiro	Houston Dynamo FC	Transfer
February 16, 2023	(Nigeria) Mujeeb Murana	(United States) Houston Dynamo 2	Houston Dynamo FC	Homegrown player
February 16, 2023	(United States) Holden Trent	(United States) High Point Panthers	Philadelphia Union	SuperDraft
February 16, 2023	(New Zealand) Bill Tuiloma	Portland Timbers	Charlotte FC	Trade
February 17, 2023	(Mexico) Julián Araujo	LA Galaxy	(Spain) Barcelona	Transfer
February 17, 2023	(United States) Robert Castellanos	(Finland) KuPS	Sporting Kansas City	Free
February 17, 2023	(Serbia) Marko Ilić	(Belgium) KV Kortrijk	Colorado Rapids	Loan
February 17, 2023	(Colombia) Jhohan Romaña	Austin FC	(Paraguay) Olimpia	Loan
February 17, 2023	(United States) Tate Schmitt	Real Salt Lake	Houston Dynamo FC	Free
February 17, 2023	(Japan) Yohei Takaoka	(Japan) Yokohama F. Marinos	Vancouver Whitecaps FC	Transfer
February 20, 2023	(United States) Tyler Boyd	(Turkey) Beşiktaş	LA Galaxy	Free
February 20, 2023	(Venezuela) Sergio Córdova	(Germany) FC Augsburg	Vancouver Whitecaps FC	Transfer
February 20, 2023	(Spain) Jesús Jiménez	Toronto FC	FC Dallas	Trade
February 20, 2023	(United States) Moses Nyeman	(Belgium) SK Beveren	Real Salt Lake	Loan
February 20, 2023	(United States) Brandon Servania	FC Dallas	Toronto FC	Trade
February 21, 2023	(United States) Maximilian Arfsten	(United States) San Jose Earthquakes II	Columbus Crew	SuperDraft
February 21, 2023	(Spain) Miguel Berry	D.C. United	Atlanta United FC	Trade
February 21, 2023	(United States) Miguel Perez	(United States) St. Louis City 2	St. Louis City SC	Homegrown player
February 21, 2023	(United States) Nelson Pierre	(United States) Philadelphia Union II	Philadelphia Union	Homegrown player
February 22, 2023	(United States) Duncan McGuire	(United States) Creighton Bluejays	Orlando City SC	SuperDraft
February 23, 2023	(Colombia) Luis Caicedo	(Colombia) Cortuluá	Houston Dynamo FC	Transfer
February 23, 2023	(United States) Cole Jensen	(United States) Xavier Musketeers	Inter Miami CF	SuperDraft
February 23, 2023	(United States) Sam Junqua	Houston Dynamo FC	FC Dallas	Trade
February 23, 2023	(Spain) Uri Rosell	Sporting Kansas City	LA Galaxy	Free
February 24, 2023	(United States) Patrick Agyemang	(United States) Rhode Island Rams	Charlotte FC	SuperDraft
February 24, 2023	(United States) Michael Edwards	Colorado Rapids	(United States) San Antonio FC	Loan
February 24, 2023	(Canada) Kobe Franklin	(Canada) Toronto FC II	Toronto FC	Homegrown player
February 24, 2023	(Sierra Leone) Kei Kamara	CF Montréal	Chicago Fire FC	Trade
February 24, 2023	(United States) Daniel Munie	(United States) Indiana Hoosiers	San Jose Earthquakes	SuperDraft
February 24, 2023	(United States) Andrew Privett	(United States) Penn State Nittany Lions	Charlotte FC	SuperDraft
February 24, 2023	(United States) Nick Scardina	(United States) Washington Huskies	Charlotte FC	SuperDraft
February 25, 2023	(United States) Eric Miller	Nashville SC	Portland Timbers	Free
February 27, 2023	(United States) Julio Benitez	Real Salt Lake	(United States) Forward Madison FC	Loan
February 27, 2023	(Brazil) Lucas Calegari	(Brazil) Fluminense	LA Galaxy	Loan
February 28, 2023	(Greece) Georgios Koutsias	(Greece) PAOK	Chicago Fire FC	Transfer
February 28, 2023	(United States) Adrien Perez	D.C. United	(United States) San Diego Loyal SC	Free
February 28, 2023	(Senegal) Mohamed Traore	Los Angeles FC	(United States) Phoenix Rising FC	Loan
March 1, 2023	(United States) Ousman Jabang	(United States) Mercer Bears	CF Montréal	SuperDraft
March 2, 2023	(Argentina) Yamil Asad	(Chile) Universidad Católica	D.C. United	Free
March 2, 2023	(Colombia) Daniel Rosero	(Colombia) Junior	Sporting Kansas City	Transfer
March 2, 2023	(Trinidad and Tobago) Luke Singh	Toronto FC	(Canada) Atlético Ottawa	Loan
March 3, 2023	(United States) Michael Nelson	Houston Dynamo FC	(United States) FC Tulsa	Loan
March 3, 2023	(El Salvador) Danny Ríos	Houston Dynamo FC	(United States) Las Vegas Lights FC	Loan
March 3, 2023	(Uruguay) Santiago Rodríguez	(Uruguay) Montevideo City Torque	New York City FC	Transfer
March 3, 2023	(Ecuador) Gustavo Vallecilla	Colorado Rapids	Columbus Crew	Loan
March 3, 2023	(United States) Isaac Walker	(United States) Kentucky Wildcats	Charlotte FC	Free
March 6, 2023	(United States) Ben Reveno	New England Revolution	(United States) Birmingham Legion FC	Loan
March 7, 2023	(United States) Jacori Hayes	Minnesota United FC	(United States) San Antonio FC	Free
March 8, 2023	(United States) Lucas Bartlett	FC Dallas	St. Louis City SC	Free
March 10, 2023	(El Salvador) Jeremy Garay	D.C. United	(United States) Loudoun United	Loan
March 10, 2023	(Spain) Alejandro Pozuelo	Inter Miami CF	(Turkey) Konyaspor	Free
March 10, 2023	(Ivory Coast) Gaoussou Samaké	D.C. United	(United States) Loudoun United	Loan
March 10, 2023	(United States) Collin Smith	FC Dallas	(United States) Birmingham Legion FC	Loan
March 13, 2023	(Ivory Coast) Franck Boli	(Hungary) Ferencváros	Portland Timbers	Transfer
March 14, 2023	(United States) Cody Cropper	Vancouver Whitecaps FC	(United States) Orange County SC	Free
March 14, 2023	(Canada) Cristián Gutiérrez	Vancouver Whitecaps FC	Toronto FC	Waivers
March 15, 2023	(Mexico) Alonso Aceves	(Mexico) Pachuca	Chicago Fire FC	Loan
March 16, 2023	(United States) Zico Bailey	FC Cincinnati	(United States) San Antonio FC	Free
March 17, 2023	(United States) Jackson Conway	Atlanta United FC	(United States) Phoenix Rising FC	Loan
March 17, 2023	(Slovakia) Ján Greguš	San Jose Earthquakes	Nashville SC	Free
March 17, 2023	(United States) Jonathan Shore	(United States) New York City FC Academy	New York City FC	Homegrown player
March 20, 2023	(Italy) Gabriele Corbo	(Italy) Bologna	CF Montréal	Transfer
March 20, 2023	(United States) Bill Hamid	D.C. United	(United States) Memphis 901 FC	Free
March 20, 2023	(England) Lewis O'Brien	(England) Nottingham Forest	D.C. United	Loan
March 21, 2023	(Argentina) Julián Aude	(Argentina) Lanús	LA Galaxy	Transfer
March 22, 2023	(South Korea) Sang Bin Jeong	(England) Wolverhampton Wanderers	Minnesota United FC	Transfer
March 22, 2023	(Serbia) Aleksandar Radovanović	(Belgium) KV Kortrijk	Austin FC	Loan
March 24, 2023	(United States) Emeka Eneli	(United States) Cornell Big Red	Real Salt Lake	SuperDraft
March 24, 2023	(United States) Richy Ledezma	(Netherlands) PSV Eindhoven	New York City FC	Loan
March 24, 2023	(United States) Jack Neeley	(United States) Charlotte FC Academy	Charlotte FC	Homegrown player
March 24, 2023	(Denmark) Erik Sviatchenko	(Denmark) Midtjylland	Houston Dynamo FC	Transfer
March 29, 2023	(Jamaica) Oniel Fisher	Minnesota United FC	(United States) Detroit City FC	Free
March 31, 2023	(Poland) Mateusz Bogusz	(England) Leeds United	Los Angeles FC	Transfer
April 1, 2023	(Ghana) Isaac Atanga	FC Cincinnati	(Norway) Aalesunds FK	Transfer
April 1, 2023	(Serbia) Novak Mićović	(Serbia) FK Čukarički	LA Galaxy	Loan
April 3, 2023	(Brazil) Thiago Andrade	New York City FC	(Brazil) Athletico Paranaense	Loan
April 6, 2023	(Spain) Alonso Coello	(Canada) Toronto FC II	Toronto FC	Free
April 10, 2023	(United States) Stephen Turnbull	(United States) New York City FC II	New York City FC	Free
April 12, 2023	(United States) Bryce Duke	Inter Miami CF	CF Montréal	Trade
April 12, 2023	(United States) Erik Hurtado	Columbus Crew	(United States) San Antonio FC	Free
April 12, 2023	(Costa Rica) Ariel Lassiter	Inter Miami CF	CF Montréal	Trade
April 12, 2023	(Canada) Kamal Miller	CF Montréal	Inter Miami CF	Trade
April 13, 2023	(Sweden) Oskar Ågren	San Jose Earthquakes	(United States) Colorado Springs Switchbacks FC	Loan
April 13, 2023	(Ecuador) Dixon Arroyo	(Ecuador) Emelec	Inter Miami CF	Free
April 13, 2023	(United States) Isaiah Parker	FC Dallas	(United States) San Antonio FC	Loan
April 18, 2023	(United States) Ben Sweat	Sporting Kansas City	New England Revolution	Free
April 21, 2023	(United States) Ryan Spaulding	New England Revolution	(United States) Tampa Bay Rowdies	Loan
April 24, 2023	(Costa Rica) Gino Vivi	(United States) Central Florida Knights	LA Galaxy	SuperDraft
April 25, 2023	(United States) Sam Adeniran	St. Louis City SC	(United States) San Antonio FC	Loan
April 25, 2023	(Nigeria) Ibrahim Aliyu	(Croatia) NK Lokomotiva	Houston Dynamo FC	Transfer
April 25, 2023	(Denmark) Malte Amundsen	New York City FC	Columbus Crew	Trade
April 25, 2023	(Colombia) Cristian Dájome	Vancouver Whitecaps FC	D.C. United	Trade
April 25, 2023	(United States) Danny Leyva	Seattle Sounders FC	Colorado Rapids	Loan
April 25, 2023	(Zambia) Aimé Mabika	Inter Miami CF	Toronto FC	Trade
April 25, 2023	(Canada) Lukas MacNaughton	Toronto FC	Nashville SC	Trade
April 25, 2023	(United States) CJ Sapong	Nashville SC	Toronto FC	Trade
April 25, 2023	(Canada) Rida Zouhir	CF Montréal	(United States) San Antonio FC	Loan
April 26, 2023	(Canada) Stephen Afrifa	(United States) Florida International Panthers	Sporting Kansas City	SuperDraft
April 26, 2023	(United States) Mauricio Cuevas	(Belgium) Club Brugge	LA Galaxy	Transfer
April 27, 2023	(Nigeria) Tani Oluwaseyi	Minnesota United FC	(United States) San Antonio FC	Loan
April 28, 2023	(Germany) Noel Caliskan	(United States) Portland Timbers 2	Portland Timbers	Free
April 28, 2023	(Iraq) Justin Meram	Real Salt Lake	Charlotte FC	Trade
April 28, 2023	(United States) David Ruiz	(United States) Inter Miami CF II	Inter Miami CF	Homegrown player
April 29, 2023	(United States) Erik Hurtado	(United States) San Antonio FC	D.C. United	Transfer
May 3, 2023	(Ghana) Ronald Donkor	(Mali) Guidars FC	New York Red Bulls	Transfer
May 8, 2023	(United States) Adam Armour	Charlotte FC	(United States) FC Tulsa	Loan
May 16, 2023	(United States) Cody Baker	(United States) Tacoma Defiance	Seattle Sounders FC	Homegrown player
May 16, 2023	(United States) Oscar Verhoeven	(United States) San Jose Earthquakes Academy	San Jose Earthquakes	Homegrown player
May 25, 2023	(United States) Gerardo Valenzuela	(United States) FC Cincinnati 2	FC Cincinnati	Homegrown player
May 26, 2023	(United States) Beto Avila	Houston Dynamo FC	(United States) Charleston Battery	Loan
May 30, 2023	(Liberia) Patrick Weah	Minnesota United FC	(United States) FC Tulsa	Loan
June 3, 2023	(England) Laurence Wyke	Nashville SC	(United States) Tampa Bay Rowdies	Loan
June 9, 2023	(United States) Bajung Darboe	Unattached	Los Angeles FC	Homegrown player
June 9, 2023	(United States) Emerson Hyndman	Atlanta United FC	(United States) Memphis 901 FC	Free
June 9, 2023	(United States) Jake LaCava	Inter Miami CF	(United States) Tampa Bay Rowdies	Loan
June 10, 2023	(Paraguay) Luis Amarilla	Minnesota United FC	(Mexico) Mazatlán	Transfer
June 16, 2023	(United States) Luis Zamudio	D.C. United	(United States) Pittsburgh Riverhounds SC	Loan
June 25, 2023	(Brazil) Luiz Araújo	Atlanta United FC	(Brazil) Flamengo	Transfer
June 28, 2023	(United States) Jake Morris	Columbus Crew	(United States) Loudoun United	Loan
June 30, 2023	(Nigeria) Emmanuel Iwe	(United States) Minnesota United FC 2	Minnesota United FC	Free
July 1, 2023	(United States) Bret Halsey	(United States) FC Cincinnati 2	FC Cincinnati	Free
July 1, 2023	(Canada) Levonte Johnson	(Canada) Whitecaps FC 2	Vancouver Whitecaps FC	Free
July 2, 2023	(Brazil) Brenner	FC Cincinnati	(Italy) Udinese	Transfer
July 3, 2023	(Costa Rica) Daniel Chacón	(United States) Colorado Rapids 2	Colorado Rapids	Free
July 3, 2023	(Costa Rica) Daniel Chacón	Colorado Rapids	(Costa Rica) Alajuelense	Loan
July 3, 2023	(Senegal) Moussa Djitté	Austin FC	(Turkey) Bandırmaspor	Loan
July 5, 2023	(Ghana) Eugene Ansah	(Israel) Hapoel Be’er Sheva	FC Dallas	Transfer
July 5, 2023	(Colombia) Cristian Arango	(Mexico) Pachuca	Real Salt Lake	Transfer
July 5, 2023	(Peru) Miguel Araujo	(Netherlands) FC Emmen	Portland Timbers	Transfer
July 5, 2023	(Canada) Scott Arfield	(Scotland) Rangers	Charlotte FC	Free
July 5, 2023	(Gabon) Aaron Boupendza	(Saudi Arabia) Al-Shabab FC	FC Cincinnati	Transfer
July 5, 2023	(Ukraine) Yevhen Cheberko	(Croatia) NK Osijek	Columbus Crew	Transfer
July 5, 2023	(United States) Brandan Craig	Philadelphia Union	Austin FC	Loan
July 5, 2023	(Ivory Coast) Ousmane Doumbia	(Switzerland) FC Lugano	Chicago Fire FC	Loan
July 5, 2023	(United States) Andrew Gutman	Atlanta United FC	Colorado Rapids	Trade
July 5, 2023	(United States) Ian Harkes	(Scotland) Dundee United	New England Revolution	Free
July 5, 2023	(Ghana) Kwadwo Opoku	Los Angeles FC	CF Montréal	Trade
July 5, 2023	(Colombia) Nelson Palacio	(Colombia) Atlético Nacional	Real Salt Lake	Transfer
July 5, 2023	(Finland) Teemu Pukki	(England) Norwich City	Minnesota United FC	Free
July 6, 2023	(United States) Drew Baiera	(United States) New York City FC Academy	New York City FC	Homegrown player
July 6, 2023	(Chile) Felipe Gutiérrez	(United Arab Emirates) Al Wasl	Sporting Kansas City	Free
July 6, 2023	(France) Tristan Muyumba	(France) EA Guingamp	Atlanta United FC	Transfer
July 6, 2023	(Libya) Ismael Tajouri-Shradi	(Cyprus) Omonia	Minnesota United FC	Free
July 7, 2023	(Venezuela) Cristian Cásseres	New York Red Bulls	(France) Toulouse	Transfer
July 10, 2023	(Argentina) Tomás Chancalay	(Argentina) Racing Club	New England Revolution	Loan
July 10, 2023	(Argentina) Franco Ibarra	Atlanta United FC	Toronto FC	Loan
July 10, 2023	(Brazil) Rafael Navarro	(Brazil) Palmeiras	Colorado Rapids	Loan
July 10, 2023	(Venezuela) Javier Otero	(United States) Orlando City B	Orlando City SC	Homegrown Player
July 11, 2023	(Mexico) Tony Alfaro	New York City FC	LA Galaxy	Trade
July 11, 2023	(Algeria) Monsef Bakrar	(Croatia) NK Istra 1961	New York City FC	Transfer
July 13, 2023	(Ghana) Latif Blessing	New England Revolution	Toronto FC	Trade
July 13, 2023	(Belgium) Brecht Dejaegere	(France) Toulouse	Charlotte FC	Free
July 13, 2023	(Canada) Mark-Anthony Kaye	Toronto FC	New England Revolution	Trade
July 14, 2023	(United States) Justin Che	FC Dallas	(Denmark) Brøndby IF	Transfer
July 15, 2023	(Argentina) Lionel Messi	(France) Paris Saint-Germain	Inter Miami CF	Free
July 15, 2023	(Argentina) Marcelino Moreno	Atlanta United FC	(Brazil) Coritiba	Transfer
July 16, 2023	(Spain) Sergio Busquets	(Spain) Barcelona	Inter Miami CF	Free
July 17, 2023	(Mexico) Rodolfo Pizarro	Inter Miami CF	(Greece) AEK Athens	Free
July 17, 2023	(Norway) Birk Risa	(Norway) Molde FK	New York City FC	Transfer
July 18, 2023	(Saint Kitts and Nevis) Ethan Bristow	(England) Tranmere Rovers	Minnesota United FC	Transfer
July 18, 2023	(South Africa) Olwethu Makhanya	(South Africa) Stellenbosch FC	Philadelphia Union	Transfer
July 18, 2023	(Curaçao) Eloy Room	Columbus Crew	(Netherlands) Vitesse	Free
July 19, 2023	(Paraguay) Diego Gómez	(Paraguay) Libertad	Inter Miami CF	Transfer
July 19, 2023	(Portugal) Nuno Santos	Charlotte FC	(Portugal) Vitória de Guimarães	Transfer
July 19, 2023	(Brazil) Júnior Urso	(Brazil) Coritiba	Orlando City SC	Free
July 20, 2023	(Spain) Jordi Alba	(Spain) Barcelona	Inter Miami CF	Free
July 21, 2023	(Argentina) Taty Castellanos	New York City FC	(Italy) Lazio	Transfer
July 21, 2023	(United States) Julian Gressel	Vancouver Whitecaps FC	Columbus Crew	Trade
July 21, 2023	(Iceland) Nökkvi Þeyr Þórisson	(Belgium) Beerschot	St. Louis City SC	Transfer
July 22, 2023	(Spain) Mario González	(Portugal) Braga	Los Angeles FC	Transfer
July 22, 2023	(Brazil) Gabriel Pereira	New York City FC	(Qatar) Al-Rayyan	Transfer
July 23, 2023	(Colombia) Juan Castilla	Houston Dynamo FC	(Colombia) Deportivo Cali	Transfer
July 24, 2023	(Australia) Miloš Degenek	Columbus Crew	(Serbia) Red Star Belgrade	Transfer
July 25, 2023	(Canada) Ayo Akinola	Toronto FC	San Jose Earthquakes	Loan
July 25, 2023	(England) Sam Surridge	(England) Nottingham Forest	Nashville SC	Transfer
July 26, 2023	(Bulgaria) Filip Krastev	(Belgium) Lommel SK	Los Angeles FC	Loan
July 26, 2023	(United States) Matt Hedges	Toronto FC	Austin FC	Trade
July 27, 2023	(Paraguay) Sebastián Ferreira	Houston Dynamo	(Brazil) Vasco da Gama	Loan
July 27, 2023	(Brazil) Gabriel Pirani	(Brazil) Santos	D.C. United	Loan
July 28, 2023	(Colombia) Fernando Álvarez	(Mexico) Pachuca	CF Montréal	Transfer
July 28, 2023	(Greece) Ilias Iliadis	CF Montréal	(Canada) Atlético Ottawa	Loan
July 28, 2023	(South Africa) Cassius Mailula	(South Africa) Mamelodi Sundowns	Toronto FC	Transfer
July 28, 2023	(Iceland) Victor Pálsson	D.C. United	(Belgium) KAS Eupen	Transfer
July 28, 2023	(United States) Andrés Perea	Philadelphia Union	New York City FC	Loan
July 29, 2023	(Argentina) Facundo Farías	(Argentina) Colón	Inter Miami CF	Transfer
July 29, 2023	(United States) Tyler Freeman	Nashville SC	(United States) Birmingham Legion FC	Loan
July 31, 2023	(France) Rudy Camacho	CF Montréal	Columbus Crew	Trade
July 31, 2023	(Colombia) Juan José Mina	(Colombia) Deportivo Cali	New York Red Bulls	Transfer
July 31, 2023	(Armenia) Lucas Zelarayán	Columbus Crew	(Saudi Arabia) Al Fateh	Transfer
August 1, 2023	(Honduras) Bryan Acosta	Colorado Rapids	Portland Timbers	Trade
August 1, 2023	(Argentina) Tomás Avilés	(Argentina) Racing Club	Inter Miami CF	Transfer
August 1, 2023	(Uruguay) Diego Fagúndez	Austin FC	LA Galaxy	Trade
August 1, 2023	(Argentina) Julián Fernández	(Argentina) Vélez Sarsfield	New York City FC	Transfer
August 1, 2023	(Poland) Sebastian Kowalczyk	(Poland) Pogoń Szczecin	Houston Dynamo FC	Transfer
August 1, 2023	(United States) Anthony Markanich	Colorado Rapids	St. Louis City SC	Trade
August 1, 2023	(Paraguay) Braian Ojeda	(England) Nottingham Forest	Real Salt Lake	Transfer
August 1, 2023	(United States) Memo Rodríguez	LA Galaxy	Austin FC	Trade
August 1, 2023	(Brazil) Andre Shinyashiki	Charlotte FC	(Azerbaijan) Neftçi PFK	Free
August 1, 2023	(Senegal) Jamal Thiaré	(France) Le Havre	Atlanta United FC	Free
August 2, 2023	(Brazil) Antony	(Portugal) Arouca	Portland Timbers	Transfer
August 2, 2023	(Israel) Tai Baribo	(Austria) Wolfsberger AC	Philadelphia Union	Transfer
August 2, 2023	(Canada) Richie Laryea	(England) Nottingham Forest	Vancouver Whitecaps FC	Loan
August 2, 2023	(Georgia (country)) Saba Lobzhanidze	(Turkey) Hatayspor	Atlanta United FC	Transfer
August 2, 2023	(Uruguay) Diego Rossi	(Turkey) Fenerbahçe	Columbus Crew	Transfer
August 2, 2023	(Portugal) Xande Silva	(France) Dijon	Atlanta United FC	Loan
August 2, 2023	(Finland) Jere Uronen	(France) Brest	Charlotte FC	Transfer
August 3, 2023	(Canada) Sam Adekugbe	(Turkey) Hatayspor	Vancouver Whitecaps FC	Transfer
August 3, 2023	(Colombia) Michael Barrios	Colorado Rapids	LA Galaxy	Trade
August 3, 2023	(Colombia) Jorge Cabezas Hurtado	(England) Watford	New York Red Bulls	Loan
August 3, 2023	(Colombia) Déiber Caicedo	Vancouver Whitecaps FC	(Colombia) Junior	Loan
August 3, 2023	(United States) Edwin Cerrillo	FC Dallas	LA Galaxy	Trade
August 3, 2023	(Ecuador) José Cifuentes	Los Angeles FC	(Scotland) Rangers	Transfer
August 3, 2023	(Panama) Eric Davis	(Slovakia) FC DAC 1904	D.C. United	Free
August 3, 2023	(Panama) José Fajardo	(Peru) Cusco FC	D.C. United	Free
August 3, 2023	(Slovakia) Ján Greguš	Nashville SC	Minnesota United FC	Trade
August 3, 2023	(United States) Matthew Hoppe	(England) Middlesbrough	San Jose Earthquakes	Loan
August 3, 2023	(Spain) Asier Illarramendi	(Spain) Real Sociedad	FC Dallas	Free
August 3, 2023	(Portugal) Sidnei Tavares	(Portugal) Porto B	Colorado Rapids	Loan
August 3, 2023	(Japan) Maya Yoshida	(Germany) Schalke 04	LA Galaxy	Free
August 4, 2023	(Canada) Liam Fraser	(Belgium) Deinze	FC Dallas	Transfer
August 4, 2023	(United States) Keegan Hughes	Columbus Crew	(United States) FC Tulsa	Loan
August 4, 2023	(Costa Rica) Alonso Martínez	(Belgium) Lommel SK	New York City FC	Transfer
August 4, 2023	(Uruguay) Cristian Olivera	(Spain) Almería	Los Angeles FC	Transfer
August 4, 2023	(Germany) Prince Osei Owusu	(Germany) Jahn Regensburg	Toronto FC	Free
August 7, 2023	(United States) Aiden McFadden	Atlanta United FC	(United States) Memphis 901 FC	Loan
August 7, 2023	(Canada) Jordan Perruzza	Toronto FC	(Canada) HFX Wanderers	Loan
August 7, 2023	(United States) Ben Reveno	New England Revolution	(United States) Indy Eleven	Loan
August 8, 2023	(Argentina) Maxi Moralez	(Argentina) Racing Club	New York City FC	Free
August 15, 2023	(United States) Paul Rothrock	(United States) Tacoma Defiance	Seattle Sounders FC	Free
August 15, 2023	(England) Billy Sharp	(England) Sheffield United	LA Galaxy	Free
August 16, 2023	(Haiti) Shanyder Borgelin	Inter Miami CF	(United States) New Mexico United	Loan
August 16, 2023	(United States) Cameron Dunbar	Minnesota United FC	(United States) Orange County SC	Loan
August 18, 2023	(Jamaica) Kevon Lambert	(United States) Phoenix Rising FC	Real Salt Lake	Transfer
August 18, 2023	(United States) Tyson Pearce	(United States) St. Louis City 2	St. Louis City SC	Homegrown player
August 23, 2023	(Kenya) Richard Odada	Philadelphia Union	(Denmark) AaB	Loan
August 26, 2023	(Serbia) Djordje Petrović	New England Revolution	(England) Chelsea	Transfer
August 26, 2023	(Czech Republic) Tomáš Vaclík	(England) Huddersfield Town	New England Revolution	Free
August 29, 2023	(Luxembourg) Maxime Chanot	New York City FC	(France) AC Ajaccio	Free
September 1, 2023	(Senegal) Mamadou Fall	Los Angeles FC	(Spain) Barcelona	Loan
September 2, 2023	(Austria) Ercan Kara	Orlando City SC	(Turkey) Samsunspor	Transfer
September 4, 2023	(United States) Gabriel Segal	New York City FC	(Israel) Hapoel Tel Aviv	Loan
September 7, 2023	(United States) Kristian Fletcher	D.C. United	(Wales) Swansea City Under-21s	Loan
September 7, 2023	(United States) Julian Hall	(United States) New York Red Bulls Academy	New York Red Bulls	Homegrown player
September 8, 2023	(Mexico) Efraín Álvarez	LA Galaxy	(Mexico) Tijuana	Transfer
September 8, 2023	(Costa Rica) Luis Díaz	Columbus Crew	Colorado Rapids	Waivers
September 9, 2023	(United States) Lawson Sunderland	(United States) Inter Miami CF II	Inter Miami CF	Free
September 12, 2023	(United States) Santiago Morales	(United States) Inter Miami Academy	Inter Miami CF	Homergrown player
September 13, 2023	(United States) Stuart Hawkins	(United States) Tacoma Defiance	Seattle Sounders FC	Homegrown player
September 14, 2023	(Canada) Junior Hoilett	(England) Reading	Vancouver Whitecaps FC	Free
September 15, 2023	(Venezuela) Sergio Córdova	Vancouver Whitecaps FC	(Turkey) Alanyaspor	Transfer
