= 2023 Colorado Rapids season =

Colorado Rapids
2023 season
- Owner: Stan Kroenke
- Head coach: Robin Fraser (until September 5); Chris Little (interim, from September 5)
- Major League Soccer: Conference: 14th Overall: 28th
- U.S. Open Cup: Round of 16
- Leagues Cup: Group stage
- Top goalscorer: League: Cole Bassett (6); All: Cole Bassett (6)
- Highest home attendance: 18,171 (July 8th vs. DAL)
- Lowest home attendance: 12,064 (September 27th vs. VAN)
- Average home league attendance: 15,409
- Biggest win: COL 3–1 LA (May 6th)
- Biggest defeat: HOU 5–1 COL (October 7th)
Home colors	Away colors

The 2023 Colorado Rapids season was the club's twenty-eighth season in existence and their twenty-eighth consecutive season in Major League Soccer (MLS), the top flight of American soccer.

== Background ==
Colorado finished the 2022 season 10th in the Western Conference table, and 18th overall in MLS. They did not qualify for the 2022 MLS Cup Playoffs. Additionally, they were knocked out of the 2022 CONCACAF Champions League in the round of 16 by Guatemalan side Comunicaciones F.C., and were eliminated from the 2022 U.S. Open Cup in the round of 32 by Minnesota United FC. They lost the Rocky Mountain Cup to Real Salt Lake.

== Roster ==
As of August 24, 2023

No.	Pos.	Nation	Player
1	GK	SRB	Marko Ilić
2	DF	USA	Keegan Rosenberry
4	DF	SCO	Danny Wilson
5	DF	DEN	Andreas Maxsø (DP)
6	DF	GHA	Lalas Abubakar
7	FW	USA	Jonathan Lewis
8	MF	BRA	Max
9	FW	BRA	Rafael Navarro (on loan from Palmieras, DP)
10	MF	POR	Sidnei Tavares (on loan from Porto B)
11	FW	CHI	Diego Rubio
13	DF	USA	Andrew Gutman
14	FW	ENG	Calvin Harris
15	MF	USA	Danny Leyva (on loan from Seattle Sounders FC)
16	DF	AUS	Alex Gersbach
18	MF	USA	Oliver Larraz (HG)
19	MF	ENG	Jack Price
20	MF	IRL	Connor Ronan
22	GK	USA	William Yarbrough
23	MF	USA	Cole Bassett (HG)
26	GK	USA	Abraham Rodriguez (HG)
27	DF	USA	Sebastian Anderson (HG)
28	MF	SCO	Sam Nicholson
29	MF	ARG	Braian Galván
30	DF	USA	Aboubacar Keita
33	DF	IRN	Steven Beitashour
34	DF	USA	Michael Edwards (HG)
39	MF	USA	Marlon Vargas
45	MF	CAM	Daouda Amadou
47	MF	JPN	Yosuke Hanya
49	FW	FRA	Rémi Cabral
64	DF	CAN	Moïse Bombito (GA)
77	FW	USA	Darren Yapi (HG)
91	FW	FRA	Kévin Cabral (DP)
97	MF	CAN	Ralph Priso

=== Out on loan ===
No.	Pos.	Nation	Player
24	DF	ECU	Gustavo Vallecilla (to Columbus Crew)
—	DF	CRC	Daniel Chacón (to Alajuelense)

== Competitions ==
Win Draw Loss Upcoming fixture

=== Preseason ===
January 19, 2023 1	Celaya F.C.	0–3	Colorado Rapids	Querétaro City, Mexico
		Report	Yapi 63', 90'; Rubio 87'

January 24, 2023 2	Mineros de Zacatecas	3–5	Colorado Rapids	Querétaro City, Mexico
	Hernández 22' (pen.); Rodriguez 55'; Corona 65'	Report	Bassett 4', 10'; Rubio 35'; Nicholson 43'; Cabral 45' (pen.)

January 29, 2023 3	Querétaro F.C.	3–1	Colorado Rapids	Querétaro City, Mexico
	Zúñiga 94', 110'; Escamilla 105'	Report	Yapi 62'
Note: 120-minute scrimmage

February 11, 2023 4	Orlando City SC	2–2	Colorado Rapids	Orlando, Florida
	González 70'; Lynn 79'	Report	Cole Bassett 58'; Rubio 68' (pen.)	Stadium: Exploria Stadium

February 15, 2023 5	Miami FC	1–3	Colorado Rapids	Orlando, Florida
	Mines 8'	Report	Cabral 20'; Rubio 78'; Markanich 81'

February 18, 2023 6	Philadelphia Union	4–1	Colorado Rapids	Davenport, Florida
11:00 AM	Gazdag 49'; Harriel 102'; Torres 106' (pen.); Donovan 125'	Report	Cabral 108'	Stadium: ChampionsGate Sports Complex
Note: 135-minutes (3 45-minute periods)

=== Major League Soccer ===
==== Standings ====
===== Western Conference =====
MLS Western Conference table (2023)
Pos	Team	Pld	W	L	T	GF	GA	GD	Pts
10	Portland Timbers	34	11	13	10	46	58	−12	43
11	Minnesota United FC	34	10	13	11	46	51	−5	41
12	Austin FC	34	10	15	9	49	55	−6	39
13	LA Galaxy	34	8	14	12	51	67	−16	36
14	Colorado Rapids	34	5	17	12	26	54	−28	27

Source: MLS
Rules for classification: 1) points; 2) total wins; 3) total goal differential; 4) total goals scored; 5) fewer disciplinary points; 6) away goal differential; 7) away goals scored; 8) home goals differential; 9) home goals scored; 10) coin toss (2 clubs tied) or drawing of lots (≥3 clubs tied)

===== Overall table =====
Overall MLS standings table
Pos	Team	Pld	W	L	T	GF	GA	GD	Pts	Qualification
25	Austin FC	34	10	15	9	49	55	−6	39	
26	LA Galaxy	34	8	14	12	51	67	−16	36	
27	Inter Miami CF (L)	34	9	18	7	41	54	−13	34	Qualification for the CONCACAF Champions Cup Round of 16 (Note: As 2023 Leagues Cup champion)
28	Colorado Rapids	34	5	17	12	26	54	−28	27	
29	Toronto FC	34	4	20	10	26	59	−33	22	

Source: MLS
Rules for classification: 1) points; 2) total wins; 3) total goal differential; 4) total goals scored; 5) fewer disciplinary points; 6) away goal differential; 7) away goals scored; 8) home goals differential; 9) home goals scored; 10) coin toss (2 clubs tied) or drawing of lots (≥3 clubs tied)
(L) Leagues Cup winner

==== Match results ====
February 26, 2023 1	Seattle Sounders FC	4−0	Colorado Rapids	Seattle, Washington
6:00 PM	Roldan 25'; Morris 45', 83'; Héber 53'	Report	Cabral (yellow card) 87'	Stadium: Lumen Field; Attendance: 30,032; Referee: Alex Chilowicz

March 4, 2023 2	Colorado Rapids	0−0	Sporting Kansas City	Commerce City, Colorado
6:30 PM	Abubakar (yellow card) 3'; Cabral (yellow card) 69'	Report	Espinoza (yellow card) 58'	Stadium: Dick's Sporting Goods Park; Attendance: 14,954; Referee: Allen Chapman

March 11, 2023 3	San Jose Earthquakes	1–0	Colorado Rapids	San Jose, California
8:30 PM	Espinoza 78'; Monteiro (red card) 90+3'	Report	Acosta (yellow card) 45+2'; Price (yellow card) 90+3'	Stadium: PayPal Park; Attendance: 13,383; Referee: Ramy Touchan

March 18, 2023 4	Colorado Rapids	1–2	Minnesota United FC	Commerce City, Colorado
7:30 PM	Max (yellow card) 35'; Bassett 49'; Priso-Mbongue (yellow card) 81'	Report	Amarilla 54' (pen.); St. Clair (yellow card) 57'; Arriaga (yellow card) 59'; Tapias 82'	Stadium: Dick's Sporting Goods Park; Attendance: 12,538; Referee: Rubiel Vazquez

March 25, 2023 5	Austin FC	1–1	Colorado Rapids	Austin, Texas
6:30 PM	Gallagher 5'; Ring (yellow card) 53'; Daniel Pereira (yellow card) 90+6'	Report	Maxsø (yellow card) 47'; Bassett (yellow card) 59'; Acosta (yellow card) 64'; Cabral 85'; Priso (yellow card) 90+6'	Stadium: Q2 Stadium; Attendance: 20,738; Referee: Ted Unkel

April 1, 2023 6	Colorado Rapids	0–0	Los Angeles FC	Commerce City, Colorado
7:30 PM	Barrios (yellow card) 87'	Report	Long (yellow card) 65'	Stadium: Dick's Sporting Goods Park; Attendance: 16,298; Referee: Drew Fischer

April 8, 2023 7	Sporting Kansas City	0–1	Colorado Rapids	Kansas City, Kansas
6:30 PM	Rosero (yellow card) 35'; Thommy (yellow card) 76'	Report	Max (yellow card) 37'; Wilson (yellow card) 58'; Rubio 68'; Nicholson (yellow card) 71'; Acosta (yellow card) 74'	Stadium: Children's Mercy Park; Attendance: 18,467; Referee: Joseph Dickerson

April 15, 2023 8	Charlotte FC	2–2	Colorado Rapids	Charlotte, North Carolina
5:30 PM	Jones (yellow card) 50'; Vargas 62'; Jóźwiak 65'	Report	Abubakar (yellow card) 2'; Rubio (yellow card) 45+2'; Max (yellow card) 52' (goal) 54'; Yapi (yellow card) 64'; Acosta (yellow card) 88'; Barrios 90+1'	Stadium: Bank of America Stadium; Attendance: 31,240; Referee: Guido Gonzales Jr.

April 22, 2023 9	Colorado Rapids	1–1	St. Louis City SC	Commerce City, Colorado
7:30 PM	Abubakar (yellow card) 89'; Barrios 90+2'; Priso (yellow card) 90+6'	Report	Stroud (yellow card) 47'; Alm 57'; Pompeu (yellow card) 79'; Parker (yellow card) 90+5'	Stadium: Dick's Sporting Goods Park; Attendance: 15,045; Referee: Marcos de Oliveira

April 29, 2023 10	Vancouver Whitecaps FC	0–0	Colorado Rapids	Vancouver, British Columbia
8:30 PM	Gauld (yellow card) 28'	Report		Stadium: BC Place; Attendance: 14,103; Referee: Tori Penso

May 6, 2023 11	LA Galaxy	1–3	Colorado Rapids	Carson, California
8:30 PM	Aude (yellow card) 45+1'; Judd 89'; Neal (yellow card) 90+4'	Report	Abubakar 14'; Cabral (yellow card) 28' (goal) 65'; Nicholson (yellow card) 52'; Lewis 81'	Stadium: Dignity Health Sports Park; Attendance: 19,101; Referee: Ramy Touchan

May 13, 2023 12	Colorado Rapids	1–2	Philadelphia Union	Commerce City, Colorado
7:30 PM	Wilson (yellow card) 18'; Ronan 38'; Abubakar (yellow card) 42'; Cabral (yellow card) 62'; Nicholson (yellow card) 79'; Barrios (yellow card) 90+9'; Galván (red card) 90+9'	Report	Bedoya (yellow card) 21'; Flach (yellow card) 41'; Wagner 45+2'; Carranza 52'; Elliott 90+9'; Glesnes (yellow card) 90+9'; Bueno (red card) 90+14'	Stadium: Dick's Sporting Goods Park; Attendance: 15,006; Referee: Victor Rivas

May 17, 2023 13	Atlanta United FC	4–0	Colorado Rapids	Atlanta, Georgia
5:30 PM	Almada 29' (yellow card) 30'; Araújo 80'; Wolff 87'; Giakoumakis 90'	Report	Priso (yellow card) 23'; Nicholson (yellow card) 53'	Stadium: Mercedes-Benz Stadium; Attendance: 42,587; Referee: Fotis Bazakos

May 20, 2023 14	Colorado Rapids	2–3	Real Salt Lake	Commerce City, Colorado
7:30 PM	Acosta (yellow card) 28'; Wilson 33'; Sam Nicholson (yellow card) 45+2'; Abubakar 74'; Cabral (yellow card) 77'	Report	Ruiz 12'; Musovski 21' (yellow card) 35'; Oviedo (yellow card) 32'; Kreilach 44'; Hidalgo (yellow card) 58'; Ojeda (yellow card) 62'; Vera (yellow card) 73'	Stadium: Dick's Sporting Goods Park; Attendance: 15,327; Referee: Jon Freemon

May 27, 2023 15	Colorado Rapids	0–1	FC Cincinnati	Commerce City, Colorado
7:30 PM	(yellow card) 62' Cabral	Report	33' Badji; (yellow card) 64' Nwobodo	Stadium: Dick's Sporting Goods Park; Attendance: 15,438; Referee: Marcos de Oliveira

May 31, 2023 16	Columbus Crew	3–2	Colorado Rapids	Columbus, Ohio
3:30 PM	Zelarayán 37'; Zawadzki 62'; Hernández 72'; Schulte (yellow card) 86'	Report	Nicholson 9'; Bombito (yellow card) 74'; Bassett 90+5'	Stadium: Lower.com Field; Attendance: 20,223; Referee: Tori Penso

June 3, 2023 17	Colorado Rapids	0–0	San Jose Earthquakes	Commerce City, Colorado
7:30 PM	Bombito (yellow card) 44' (yellow-red card) 51'; Cabral (yellow card) 59'	Report		Stadium: Dick's Sporting Goods Park; Attendance: 15,038; Referee: Sergii Boiko

June 10, 2023 18	Orlando City SC	2–0	Colorado Rapids	Orlando, Florida
5:30 PM	Carlos (yellow card) 24'; Smith (yellow card) 52'; Torres 56'; Enrique 83'	Report	Abubakar (yellow card) 6' (yellow-red card) 75'; Galván (red card) 39'; Yapi (yellow card) 89'	Stadium: Exploria Stadium; Attendance: 18,711; Referee: Rosendo Mendoza

June 24, 2023 20	Colorado Rapids	0–0	LA Galaxy	Commerce City, Colorado
7:30 PM	Bassett (yellow card) 74'; Rosenberry (yellow card) 76'	Report	Puig (yellow card) 80'	Stadium: Dick's Sporting Goods Park; Attendance: 16,082; Referee: Lukasz Szpala

July 1, 2023 21	St. Louis City SC	2–0	Colorado Rapids	St Louis, Missouri
7:30 PM	Parker 4'; Stroud 11'	Report	Priso (yellow card) 75'	Stadium: CityPark; Attendance: 22,423; Referee: Fotis Bazakos

July 8, 2023 23	Colorado Rapids	2–1	FC Dallas	Commerce City, Colorado
7:30PM	Rosenberry (yellow card) 25'; Maxsø 31'; Gutman (yellow card) 45+2'; Galván 62' (pen.); Bassett (yellow card) 68'; Acosta (yellow card) 81'; Barrios (yellow card) 83'	Report	Junqua 18'; Ibeagha (yellow card) 74'	Stadium: Dick's Sporting Goods Park; Attendance: 18,171; Referee: Marcos de Oliveira

July 12, 2023 22	Colorado Rapids	0–0	Portland Timbers	Commerce City, Colorado
7:30 PM	Abubakar (yellow card) 65'	Report	Chará (yellow card) 69'; Griffith (yellow card) 76'; Boli (yellow card) 78'	Stadium: Dick's Sporting Goods Park; Attendance: 17,426; Referee: Pierre-Luc Lauziere
Note: Match was abandoned on July 4 at halftime due to severe weather in the area, and it resumed on July 12.

July 15, 2023 24	Colorado Rapids	0–0	Houston Dynamo FC	Commerce City, Colorado
7:30 PM		Report	Ibrahim (yellow card) 30'; Quiñónes (yellow card) 45+1'	Stadium: Dick's Sporting Goods Park; Attendance: 16,138; Referee: Filip Dujic

August 23, 2023 25	Los Angeles FC	4–0	Colorado Rapids	Los Angeles, California
8:30 PM	Chiellini (yellow card) 5'; Bogusz 19', (yellow card) 49'; Vela 29'; Hollingshead 36'; Palencia (yellow card) 43'; Olivera 83'	Report	Tavares (yellow card) 45+1'; Wilson (yellow card) 55'; Navarro (yellow card) 65'; Ronan (yellow card) 72'; Priso (yellow card) 89'	Stadium: BMO Stadium; Attendance: 22,017; Referee: Guido Gonzales Jr.
Note: Match rescheduled from August 20 due to Hurricane Hilary making landfall in Southern California.

August 30, 2023 26	Minnesota United FC	3–0	Colorado Rapids	Saint Paul, Minnesota
6:30 PM	Reynoso 18' (pen.), 28'; Pukki 43'; Taylor (yellow card) 58'	Report	Galván (yellow card) 48'; Tavares (yellow card) 64'; Wilson (yellow card) 71'; Ronan (yellow card) 76'; Bombito (yellow card) 79'	Stadium: Allianz Field; Attendance: 19,634; Referee: Marcos de Oliveira

September 2, 2023 27	Real Salt Lake	2–0	Colorado Rapids	Sandy, Utah
7:30 PM	Vera 19', (yellow card) 62'; Palacio (yellow card) 24'; Arango 49'	Report	Ronan (yellow card) 16'; Maxsø (yellow card) 42'; Abubakar (yellow card) 72'	Stadium: America First Field; Attendance: 19,798; Referee: Nima Saghafi

September 16, 2023 28	Colorado Rapids	2–1	New England Revolution	Commerce City, Colorado
7:30 PM	Navarro (yellow card) 40'; Cabral (yellow card) 45'; Bassett 48'; Harris 62'; Rubio (yellow card) 72'; Nicholson (yellow card) 84'	Report	Gonzalez (yellow card) 7', (goal) 90+2'; Gil (yellow card) 49'; Harkes (yellow card) 59'	Stadium: Dick's Sporting Goods Park; Attendance: 16,411; Referee: Rosendo Mendoza

September 20, 2023 29	Colorado Rapids	1–2	Seattle Sounders FC	Commerce City, Colorado
7:30 PM	Bassett 80'	Report	Léo Chú 34'; Nouhou (yellow card) 40'; Rusnák 56'	Stadium: Dick's Sporting Goods Park; Attendance: 12,548; Referee: Filip Dujic

September 23, 2023 30	Portland Timbers	3–2	Colorado Rapids	Commerce City, Colorado
8:30 PM	Antony 19'; Caliskan (yellow card) 24'; Moreno 30'; Mora (yellow card) 40', (goal) 71'; Bravo (yellow card) 48'; Župarić (yellow card) 64'; Boli (yellow card) 90+6'	Report	Rubio 31', (yellow card) 70'; Gutman 43'; Leyva (yellow card) 45+3'; Díaz (yellow card) 90'	Stadium: Dick's Sporting Goods Park; Attendance: 22,248; Referee: Guido Gonzales Jr.

September 27, 2023 19	Colorado Rapids	2–2	Vancouver Whitecaps FC	Commerce City, Colorado
7:30 PM	Rubio 47'; Rosenberry (yellow card) 62'; Bassett 67'; Bombito (yellow card) 87'	Report	Laborda 11'; White 78'	Stadium: Dick's Sporting Goods Park; Attendance: 12,064; Referee: Elton Garcia
Note: Match was rescheduled from June 21 to September 27 due to thunderstorms in the area.

September 30, 2023 31	Colorado Rapids	1–0	Austin FC	Commerce City, Colorado
7:30 PM	Bombito (yellow card) 32'; Maxsø 41'; Yapi (yellow card) 76'	Report	Bruin (yellow card) 88'; Rigoni (yellow card) 90+1'	Stadium: Dick's Sporting Goods Park; Attendance: 15,931; Referee: Mark Allatin

October 7, 2023 33	Houston Dynamo FC	5–1	Colorado Rapids	Houston, Texas
6:30 PM	Quiñónes 3', 28'; Bassi 8'; Baird 41'; Dorsey (yellow card) 48'; Artur 84'	Report	Bassett 53', (yellow card) 63'; Abubakar (yellow card) 57'; Priso (yellow card) 86'	Stadium: Shell Energy Stadium; Attendance: 16,430; Referee: Tori Penso

October 14, 2023 32	FC Dallas	1–1	Colorado Rapids	Frisco, Texas
6:30 PM	Velasco 37'; Pomykal (yellow card) 42'	Report	Priso (yellow card) 2'; Navarro 25'; Lewis (yellow card) 54'	Stadium: Toyota Stadium; Attendance: 16,014; Referee: Marcos de Oliveira
Note: Match rescheduled from October 4 due to inclement weather in the area.

October 21, 2023 34	Colorado Rapids	0–1	Real Salt Lake	Commerce City, Colorado
7:00 PM	Bassett (yellow card) 15'	Report	Julio (yellow card) 30'; Luna 74'	Stadium: Dick's Sporting Goods Park; Attendance: 17,538; Referee: Timothy Ford

=== Leagues Cup ===
==== Central 4 ====
Pos	Team	Pld	W	PW	PL	L	GF	GA	GD	Pts	Qualification	TOL	NAS	COL
1	(Mexico) Toluca	2	2	0	0	0	8	4	+4	6	Advance to knockout stage	—	—	4–1
2	(United States) Nashville SC	2	1	0	0	1	5	5	0	3	Advance to knockout stage	3–4	—	2–1
3	(United States) Colorado Rapids	2	0	0	0	2	2	6	−4	0		—	—	—

Source: Leagues Cup
Rules for classification: Tiebreakers

July 23, 2023 GS	Nashville SC (United States)	2–1	(United States) Colorado Rapids	Nashville
8:30 pm ET	Mukhtar 57'; Shaffelburg 65'; Bunbury (yellow card) 90+3'	Report	Gutman 80'	Stadium: GEODIS Park; Attendance: 16,087; Referee: David Gómez

July 31, 2023 GS	Colorado Rapids (United States)	1–4	(Mexico) Toluca	Commerce City, Colorado
9:30 pm ET	Wilson (yellow card) 21'; Galván (yellow card) 65'; Priso (yellow card) 82'; Rubio 90+1' (pen.)	Report	Raul 45'; Ruiz (yellow card) 59'; López 76'; Baeza (yellow card) 80'; Piñuelas (yellow card) 90+2'; Angulo 90+3'; Huerta 90+7' (pen.)	Stadium: Dick's Sporting Goods Park; Attendance: 15,388; Referee: Selvin Brown

=== U.S. Open Cup ===
April 26, 2023 Third Round	Colorado Rapids (MLS)	3–1	Northern Colorado Hailstorm (USL1)	Commerce City, Colorado
5:00 PM MDT	Lewis 5', 55'; Max 65'; Anderson (yellow card) 67'		Dietrich 40'	Stadium: Dick's Sporting Goods Park; Attendance: 200; Referee: Brandon Stevis

May 9, 2023 Round of 32	Sacramento Republic FC (USLC) (California)	2–4	Colorado Rapids (MLS)	Sacramento, California
7:30 PM PDT	Herrera 30', 52'; Wiedt (yellow card) 61' (yellow-red card) 62'	Report	Lewis 4'; Edwards 15'; Leyva (yellow card) 19'; Nicholson 55'; Markanich (yellow card) 79'; Barrios 81'; Priso (yellow card) 83'	Stadium: Heart Health Park; Attendance: 8,897; Referee: Ricardo Fierro

May 24, 2023 Round of 16	Colorado Rapids (MLS)	0–1	(Utah) Real Salt Lake (MLS)	Commerce City, Colorado
8:00 PM MDT	Rosenberry (yellow card) 78'	Report	Gómez (yellow card) 12'; Savarino 30'; Ojeda (yellow card) 37'; Löffelsend (yellow card) 82'	Stadium: Dick's Sporting Goods Park; Attendance: 2,280; Referee: Andrew Musashe

== Statistics ==
=== Appearances and goals ===
Numbers after plus–sign (+) denote appearances as a substitute.

No.	Pos	Nat	Player	Total		MLS		USOC		LC	
No.	Pos	Nat	Player	Apps	Goals	Apps	Goals	Apps	Goals	Apps	Goals
1	GK	(Serbia) SRB	Marko Ilić	16	0	13	0	3	0	0	0
2	DF	(United States) USA	Keegan Rosenberry	30	0	25+1	0	1+1	0	2	0
4	DF	(Scotland) SCO	Danny Wilson	33	1	25+4	1	0+2	0	2	0
5	DF	(Denmark) DEN	Andreas Maxsø	38	2	33	2	3	0	2	0
6	DF	(Ghana) GHA	Lalas Abubakar	28	2	23+3	2	2	0	0	0
7	FW	(United States) USA	Jonathan Lewis	29	4	12+14	1	2+1	3	0	0
8	MF	(Brazil) BRA	Max Alves	12	2	7+3	1	2	1	0	0
9	FW	(Brazil) BRA	Rafael Navarro	10	1	10	1	0	0	0	0
10	MF	(Portugal) POR	Sidnei Tavares	5	0	5	0	0	0	0	0
11	FW	(Chile) CHI	Diego Rubio	17	4	13+3	3	0	0	0+1	1
12	FW	(Costa Rica) CRC	Luis Diaz	3	0	0+3	0	0	0	0	0
13	DF	(United States) USA	Andrew Gutman	14	2	12	1	0	0	2	1
14	FW	(England) ENG	Calvin Harris	21	1	11+7	1	0+1	0	2	0
15	MF	(United States) USA	Danny Leyva	19	0	6+10	0	2	0	1	0
16	DF	(Australia) AUS	Alex Gersbach	5	0	3	0	1+1	0	0	0
18	FW	(United States) USA	Oliver Larraz	2	0	0+1	0	0+1	0	0	0
19	MF	(England) ENG	Jack Price	2	0	0+2	0	0	0	0	0
20	MF	(Republic of Ireland) IRL	Connor Ronan	38	1	33+1	1	0+2	0	2	0
22	GK	(United States) USA	William Yarbrough	22	0	20	0	0	0	2	0
23	MF	(United States) USA	Cole Bassett	27	6	22+3	6	0	0	2	0
26	GK	(United States) USA	Abraham Rodriguez	1	0	1	0	0	0	0	0
27	DF	(United States) USA	Sebastian Anderson	6	0	3+1	0	2	0	0	0
28	FW	(Scotland) SCO	Sam Nicholson	26	2	20+2	1	1+1	1	0+2	0
29	MF	(Argentina) ARG	Braian Galván	24	1	6+14	1	1+1	0	2	0
33	DF	(Iran) IRN	Steven Beitashour	12	0	7+5	0	0	0	0	0
34	DF	(United States) USA	Michael Edwards	2	1	0	0	1+1	1	0	0
39	MF	(United States) USA	Marlon Vargas	2	0	0+1	0	1	0	0	0
47	MF	(Japan) JPN	Yosuke Hanya	2	0	0+2	0	0	0	0	0
49	MF	(France) FRA	Rémi Cabral	1	0	0+1	0	0	0	0	0
64	DF	(Canada) CAN	Moïse Bombito	14	0	8+3	0	1	0	1+1	0
77	FW	(United States) USA	Darren Yapi	22	0	8+12	0	1	0	1	0
91	FW	(France) FRA	Kévin Cabral	32	2	14+13	2	2+1	0	0+2	0
97	MF	(Canada) CAN	Ralph Priso	30	0	11+15	0	2	0	1+1	0
Players transferred/loaned out during the season
12	FW	(Colombia) COL	Michael Barrios	25	3	7+13	2	2+1	1	0+2	0
21	MF	(Honduras) HON	Bryan Acosta	16	0	13+1	0	1	0	0+1	0
31	DF	(United States) USA	Anthony Markanich	13	0	3+7	0	2+1	0	0	0

- Last updated: October 21, 2023
- Source: Colorado stats

=== Top scorers ===
Rank	Position	Number	Name	MLS	US Open Cup	Leagues Cup	Total
1	MF	23	(United States) Cole Bassett	6	0	0	6
2	FW	7	(United States) Jonathan Lewis	1	3	0	4
2	FW	11	(Chile) Diego Rubio	3	0	1	4
4	FW	12	(Colombia) Michael Barrios	2	1	0	3
5	DF	5	(Denmark) Andreas Maxsø	2	0	0	2
5	DF	6	(Ghana) Lalas Abubakar	2	0	0	2
5	MF	8	(Brazil) Max	1	1	0	2
5	DF	13	(United States) Andrew Gutman	1	0	1	2
5	FW	28	(Scotland) Sam Nicholson	1	1	0	2
5	FW	91	(France) Kévin Cabral	2	0	0	2
11	DF	4	(Scotland) Danny Wilson	1	0	0	1
11	FW	9	(Brazil) Rafael Navarro	1	0	0	1
11	FW	14	(England) Calvin Harris	1	0	0	1
11	MF	20	(Republic of Ireland) Connor Ronan	1	0	0	1
11	MF	29	(Argentina) Braian Galván	1	0	0	1
11	DF	34	(United States) Michael Edwards	0	1	0	1
Total				26	7	2	35

- Last updated: October 21, 2023
- Source: Team Goals

=== Top assists ===
Rank	Position	Number	Name	MLS	US Open Cup	Leagues Cup	Total
1	MF	20	(Republic of Ireland) Connor Ronan	8	0	0	8
2	FW	14	(England) Calvin Harris	3	0	0	3
3	FW	11	(Chile) Diego Rubio	2	0	0	2
3	FW	12	(Colombia) Michael Barrios	2	0	0	2
5	DF	4	(Scotland) Danny Wilson	1	0	0	1
5	FW	7	(United States) Jonathan Lewis	0	1	0	1
5	MF	8	(Brazil) Max	0	1	0	1
5	FW	9	(Brazil) Rafael Navarro	1	0	0	1
5	MF	15	(United States) Danny Leyva	0	1	0	1
5	DF	16	(Australia) Alex Gersbach	0	1	0	1
5	MF	23	(United States) Cole Bassett	1	0	0	1
5	FW	28	(Scotland) Sam Nicholson	1	0	0	1
5	MF	29	(Argentina) Braian Galván	0	1	0	1
5	FW	77	(United States) Darren Yapi	1	0	0	1
5	FW	91	(France) Kévin Cabral	0	0	1	1
5	MF	97	(Canada) Ralph Priso	0	1	0	1
Total				20	6	1	27

- Last updated: October 21, 2023
- Source: Team Assists

=== Clean sheets ===
Rank	Position	Number	Name	MLS	US Open Cup	Leagues Cup	Total
1	GK	22	(United States) William Yarbrough	7	0	0	7
2	GK	1	(Serbia) Marko Ilić	2	0	0	2
Total				9	0	0	9

- Last updated: October 21, 2023
- Source: Clean Sheets

=== Disciplinary record ===
Rank	No.	Pos.	Player	MLS			US Open Cup			Leagues Cup			Total		
Rank	No.	Pos.	Player	Booked	(yellow card) (yellow-red card)	Sent off (straight red)	Booked	(yellow card) (yellow-red card)	Sent off (straight red)	Booked	(yellow card) (yellow-red card)	Sent off (straight red)	Booked	(yellow card) (yellow-red card)	Sent off (straight red)
1	97	MF	(Canada) Ralph Priso	8	0	0	1	0	0	1	0	0	10	0	0
2	6	DF	(Ghana) Lalas Abubakar	8	1	0	0	0	0	0	0	0	8	1	0
3	91	FW	(France) Kévin Cabral	8	0	0	0	0	0	0	0	0	8	0	0
4	4	DF	(Scotland) Danny Wilson	5	0	0	0	0	0	1	0	0	6	0	0
4	21	MF	(Honduras) Bryan Acosta	6	0	0	0	0	0	0	0	0	6	0	0
4	28	FW	(Scotland) Sam Nicholson	6	0	0	0	0	0	0	0	0	6	0	0
4	64	DF	(Canada) Moïse Bombito	5	1	0	0	0	0	0	0	0	5	1	0
8	23	MF	(United States) Cole Bassett	5	0	0	0	0	0	0	0	0	5	0	0
9	29	MF	(Argentina) Braian Galván	1	0	2	0	0	0	1	0	0	2	0	2
10	2	DF	(United States) Keegan Rosenberry	2	0	0	1	0	0	0	0	0	3	0	0
10	8	MF	(Brazil) Max	3	0	0	0	0	0	0	0	0	3	0	0
10	11	FW	(Chile) Diego Rubio	3	0	0	0	0	0	0	0	0	3	0	0
10	12	FW	(Colombia) Michael Barrios	3	0	0	0	0	0	0	0	0	3	0	0
10	20	MF	(Republic of Ireland) Connor Ronan	3	0	0	0	0	0	0	0	0	3	0	0
10	77	FW	(United States) Darren Yapi	3	0	0	0	0	0	0	0	0	3	0	0
16	5	DF	(Denmark) Andreas Maxsø	2	0	0	0	0	0	0	0	0	2	0	0
16	9	FW	(Brazil) Rafael Navarro	2	0	0	0	0	0	0	0	0	2	0	0
16	10	MF	(Portugal) Sidnei Tavares	2	0	0	0	0	0	0	0	0	2	0	0
16	15	MF	(United States) Danny Leyva	1	0	0	1	0	0	0	0	0	2	0	0
20	2	DF	(United States) Keegan Rosenberry	1	0	0	0	0	0	0	0	0	1	0	0
20	7	FW	(United States) Jonathan Lewis	1	0	0	0	0	0	0	0	0	1	0	0
20	12	FW	(Costa Rica) Luis Diaz	1	0	0	0	0	0	0	0	0	1	0	0
20	13	DF	(United States) Andrew Gutman	1	0	0	0	0	0	0	0	0	1	0	0
20	19	MF	(England) Jack Price	1	0	0	0	0	0	0	0	0	1	0	0
20	27	DF	(United States) Sebastian Anderson	0	0	0	1	0	0	0	0	0	1	0	0
20	31	DF	(United States) Anthony Markanich	0	0	0	1	0	0	0	0	0	1	0	0
Total				81	2	2	5	0	0	3	0	0	89	2	2

- Last updated: October 21, 2023
- Source: Team Discipline

== Transfers ==
For transfers in, dates listed are when the Rapids officially signed the players to the roster. For transfers out, dates are listed when the Rapids officially removed the players from the roster, not when they signed with another club. If a player later signed with a different club, his new club will be noted, but the date listed remains when he was officially removed from the roster.

=== In ===
Pos.	Player	Transferred from	Fee/notes	Date	Source
FW	(France) Kévin Cabral	(United States) LA Galaxy	LA Galaxy receives $1 million in GAM.	December 8, 2023	
FW	(England) Calvin Harris	(United States) FC Cincinnati	FC Cincinnati receives up to $375K in GAM.	December 21, 2022	
MF	(Republic of Ireland) Connor Ronan	(England) Wolverhampton Wanderers	Transfer fee undisclosed.	January 23, 2023	
DF	(Denmark) Andreas Maxsø	(Denmark) Brøndby IF	Transfer fee undisclosed.	January 27, 2023	
DF	(Australia) Alex Gersbach	(France) Grenoble	Transfer fee undisclosed.	January 30, 2023	
DF	(Costa Rica) Daniel Chacón	(United States) Colorado Rapids 2	2-year contract	July 3, 2023	
DF	(United States) Andrew Gutman	(United States) Atlanta United FC	Atlanta receives $400K in GAM and a 2023 International Roster Spot.	July 5, 2023	
GK	(Serbia) Marko Ilić	(Belgium) K.V. Kortrijk	Transfer fee undisclosed.	July 15, 2023	
FW	(Costa Rica) Luis Díaz	(United States) Columbus Crew SC	Selected off waivers.	September 7, 2023	

==== Loans in ====
Pos.	Player	Parent club	Length/Notes	Beginning	End	Source
GK	(Serbia) Marko Ilić	(Belgium) K.V. Kortrijk	Through July 2023 with option to buy	February 2023	July 2023	
MF	(United States) Danny Leyva	(United States) Seattle Sounders FC	For the duration of the 2023 season	April 2023	October 2023	
FW	(Brazil) Rafael Navarro	(Brazil) Palmeiras	Through June 30, 2024, with option to buy	July 2023	June 2024	
MF	(Portugal) Sidnei Tavares	(Portugal) Porto B	11 month loan with option to buy	August 2023	July 2024	

==== SuperDraft ====
Draft picks are not automatically signed to the team roster. Only those who are signed to a contract will be listed as transfers in. Only trades involving draft picks and executed after the start of the 2023 MLS SuperDraft will be listed in the notes.

Player	Position	Previous club	Notes
Moïse Bombito	DF	New Hampshire Wildcats	Round 1, Pick 3, signed
Oliver Semmle	GK	Marshall Thundering Herd	Round 2, Pick 41

=== Out ===
Pos.	Player	Transferred to	Fee/notes	Date	Source
MF	(Kenya) Philip Mayaka	(United States) Crown Legacy FC	Option declined.	November 10, 2022	
MF	(United States) Collen Warner		Option waived.	November 10, 2022	
DF	(Brazil) Lucas Esteves	(Brazil) Palmeiras	Option to purchase declined, loan concluded.	December 1, 2022	
GK	(United States) Clint Irwin	(United States) Minnesota United FC	Free transfer.	December 6, 2022	
FW	(United States) Gyasi Zardes	(United States) Austin FC	Free transfer.	December 12, 2022	
FW	(United States) Dantouma Toure		Waived.	April 20, 2023	
MF	(Honduras) Bryan Acosta	(United States) Portland Timbers	Colorado receives $150,000 in GAM. Deal may escalate to $325,000 in GAM.	August 1, 2023	
DF	(United States) Anthony Markanich	(United States) St. Louis City SC	Colorado receives $75,000 in GAM and a first-round pick in the 2024 MLS SuperDraft. Deal may escalate to $150,000 in GAM.	August 1, 2023	
FW	(Colombia) Michael Barrios	(United States) LA Galaxy	Colorado receives a first-round pick in the 2024 MLS SuperDraft. Deal may escalate to include $50,000 in GAM.	August 3, 2023	

==== Loans out ====
Pos.	Player	Loanee club	Length/Notes	Beginning	End	Source
DF	(Ecuador) Gustavo Vallecilla	(United States) Columbus Crew SC	For the 2023 MLS season	March 2023	October 2023	
DF	(Costa Rica) Daniel Chacón	(Costa Rica) Alajuelense	For the remainder of the 2023 season	July 2023	November 2023	
