= Michael Barrios =

Colombian footballer (born 1991)

Personal information
- Full name: Michael David Barrios Puerta
- Date of birth: 21 April 1991 (age 35)
- Place of birth: Barranquilla, Colombia
- Height: 1.63 m (5 ft 4 in)
- Position: Winger

Team information
- Current team: Once Caldas
- Number: 7

Senior career*
Years	Team	Apps	(Gls)
2011–2015	Uniautónoma	140	(35)
2015–2020	FC Dallas	179	(31)
2021–2023	Colorado Rapids	87	(12)
2022	Colorado Rapids 2	2	(0)
2023	LA Galaxy	6	(1)
2024	América de Cali	11	(2)
2024–	Once Caldas	60	(14)
- * Club domestic league appearances and goals as of 12 December 2025

Michael David Barrios Puerta (born 21 April 1991) is a Colombian professional footballer who plays as a winger for Once Caldas.

== Club career ==
Barrios spent four seasons with Colombian Categoría Primera A side Uniautónoma before signing with Major League Soccer club FC Dallas on 19 February 2015. During the 2018 season, Barrios scored a hat-trick for Dallas to defeat Sporting Kansas City.

On 13 January 2021, after six seasons with Dallas, Barrios transferred to Colorado Rapids. Barrios left Dallas as the club's second all-time leader in combined goals and assists with 75. He finished in the top-5 in MLS in assists in 2017 and 2019 and is one of just five MLS players to register 30 goals and 40 assists since 2015.

== Career statistics ==
=== Club ===
As of match played 3 August 2023

Appearances and goals by club, season and competition
Club	Season	League			National cup		Continental		Other		Total	
Club	Season	Division	Apps	Goals	Apps	Goals	Apps	Goals	Apps	Goals	Apps	Goals
Uniautónoma	2011	Primera B	18	3	8	3	—		—		26	6
Uniautónoma	2012	Primera B	36	12	8	2	—		—		44	14
Uniautónoma	2013	Primera B	49	13	3	0	—		—		52	13
Uniautónoma	2014	Primera A	33	7	3	0	—		2 (Note: Appearance(s) in Primera A Promotion/relegation playoff)	0	36	7
Uniautónoma	2015	Primera A	4	0	—		—		—		6	0
Uniautónoma	Total		140	35	22	5	0	0	2	0	164	40
FC Dallas	2015	Major League Soccer	26	7	2	3	—		4 (Note: Appearance(s) in MLS Cup Playoffs)	0	32	10
FC Dallas	2016	Major League Soccer	32	9	4	0	3 (Note: Appearance(s) in CONCACAF Champions League)	1	2	0	41	10
FC Dallas	2017	Major League Soccer	34	3	3	0	4	1	—		41	3
FC Dallas	2018	Major League Soccer	34	6	2	0	2	0	—		38	6
FC Dallas	2019	Major League Soccer	32	5	2	1	—		1	0	35	6
FC Dallas	2020	Major League Soccer	21	1	—		—		2	0	23	1
FC Dallas	Total		179	31	13	4	9	2	9	0	210	36
Colorado Rapids	2021	Major League Soccer	34	8	0	0	—		0	0	34	8
Colorado Rapids	2022	Major League Soccer	34	2	1	0	2	0	0	0	37	2
Colorado Rapids	2023	Major League Soccer	20	2	3	1	0	0	2 (Note: Appearance(s) in the Leagues Cup)	0	27	3
Colorado Rapids	Total		88	12	4	1	2	0	2	0	98	13
Career total			407	78	39	10	13	2	11	0	472	90

== Honors and awards ==
FC Dallas

- Lamar Hunt U.S. Open Cup: 2016
- Supporters' Shield: 2016
