= Braian Galván =

Argentine association football player

Personal information
- Full name: Braian Alejandro Galván
- Date of birth: 6 October 2000 (age 26)
- Place of birth: San Miguel de Tucumán, Argentina
- Height: 1.66 m (5 ft 5 in)
- Position: Midfielder

Team information
- Current team: Panserraikos
- Number: 16

Youth career
- Estudiantes
- Colón

Senior career*
Years	Team	Apps	(Gls)
2017–2020	Colón	9	(1)
2020–2023	Colorado Rapids	53	(4)
2024	Banfield	26	(2)
2025–	Panserraikos	13	(1)
- * Club domestic league appearances and goals as of 22 December 2025

Braian Alejandro Galván (born 6 October 2000) is an Argentine professional footballer who plays as a midfielder for Super League Greece club Panserraikos.

== Club career ==
Galván had a spell with Estudiantes in his youth career, which preceded him joining Colón. He got his senior career going with the club in December 2017, making his professional debut for the Argentine Primera División team during a defeat at home to Talleres; having previously been an unused substitute in August against Rosario Central. His first goal arrived in November 2019 during a 3–2 victory over Estudiantes.

On 16 January 2020, it was announced that Galván would join MLS side Colorado Rapids on 7 July 2020. Galván made his Rapids debut on 22 July in a 2–2 draw against Minnesota United at the MLS is Back Tournament. Galván scored his first goal in Burgundy in Colorado's 5–0 win over Real Salt Lake on 12 September as they reclaimed the Rocky Mountain Cup. Galván earned his first assist with Colorado for Jonathan Lewis' goal in the Rapids' 2–0 victory over LA Galaxy on 19 September. Galván finished his first season with one goal and one assist in ten appearances, including in Colorado's first-round playoff loss at Minnesota.

In February 2022, Galván underwent a successful surgery on his right knee.

Galván signed with Argentine Primera División side Banfield on 9 February 2024.

== International career ==
In 2018, Galván was called up by the Argentina U20s to train against the senior side during the 2018 World Cup in Russia.

== Personal life ==
In December 2020, Galván married his wife, Maria.

== Career statistics ==
As of 21 October 2023

Club statistics
Club	Season	League			Cup		League Cup		Continental		Other		Total	
Club	Season	Division	Apps	Goals	Apps	Goals	Apps	Goals	Apps	Goals	Apps	Goals	Apps	Goals
Colón	2017–18	Primera División	1	0	—		—		—		—		1	0
Colón	2018–19	Primera División	3	0	1	0	—		—		—		4	0
Colón	2019–20	Primera División	5	1	—		—		—		—		5	1
Colón	Total		9	1	1	0	—		—		—		10	1
Colorado Rapids	2020	Major League Soccer	9	1	—		—		—		1 (Note: Appearances in the MLS Cup Playoffs)	0	10	1
Colorado Rapids	2021	Major League Soccer	24	2	—		—		—		0	0	24	2
Colorado Rapids	2022	Major League Soccer	0	0	0	0	—		—		0	0	0	0
Colorado Rapids	2023	Major League Soccer	20	1	2	0	—		2 (Note: Appearances in the Leagues Cup)	0	0	0	24	1
Colorado Rapids	Total		53	4	2	0	0	0	2	0	1	0	58	4
Career total			62	5	3	0	0	0	2	0	1	0	68	5
