= Marko Ilić (footballer, born 1998) =

Serbian footballer

Personal information
- Date of birth: 3 February 1998 (age 28)
- Place of birth: Novi Sad, FR Yugoslavia
- Height: 1.91 m (6 ft 3 in)
- Position: Goalkeeper

Team information
- Current team: Kortrijk
- Number: 41

Youth career
- 2010–2016: Vojvodina

Senior career*
Years	Team	Apps	(Gls)
2015–2018	Vojvodina	1	(0)
2015	→ Cement Beočin (loan)	3	(0)
2017	→ Proleter Novi Sad (loan)	7	(0)
2018–2020	Voždovac	60	(0)
2020–2023	Kortrijk	71	(0)
2023	→ Colorado Rapids (loan)	3	(0)
2023	→ Colorado Rapids 2 (loan)	2	(0)
2023–2024	Colorado Rapids	10	(0)
2023	→ Colorado Rapids 2 (loan)	1	(0)
2024	→ Sarpsborg 08 (loan)	14	(0)
2024–2025	Red Star Belgrade	10	(0)
2025–	Kortrijk	33	(0)

International career^{‡}
2015	Serbia U17 (Note: Official competitive UEFA matches only.)	1	(0)
2016–2017	Serbia U19	6	(0)
2019–2020	Serbia U21	8	(0)
2021	Serbia	1	(0)
- * Club domestic league appearances and goals as of 19 April 2026 ‡ National team caps and goals as of 13 June 2022

Marko Ilić (Serbian Cyrillic: Марко Илић; born 3 February 1998) is a Serbian professional footballer who plays as a goalkeeper for Belgian Pro League club Kortrijk.

== Club career ==
=== Vojvodina ===
Born in Novi Sad, Ilić passed Vojvodina youth school and joined the first team during the 2015–16 Serbian SuperLiga season at the age of 17. He was used as a reserve option sitting on the bench a couple of times until the end of a season, without official appearances. He spent a short part of his career on loan at Serbian League Vojvodina side Cement Beočin. Having spent first half of the 2016–17 season serving as a youth team first choice keeper, and a senior team backup keeper, in the second half of the season Ilić was sent on loan to Proleter Novi Sad. In summer 2017 he returned to the first team, being licensed with Vojvodina for the 2017–18 UEFA Europa League qualifications and the domestic competitions. On 8 December 2017, Ilić signed his first professional contract with the club, penning a three-year deal. Ilić made his debut for Vojvodina in a 6–1 away win over Čukarički on 17 May 2018.

=== Voždovac ===
On 2 August 2018, Marko Ilić signed a three-year deal with Voždovac.

=== Kortrijk ===
On 10 September 2020, Ilić signed a four-year contract with Kortrijk. One month after signing the contract, in December 2020, Ilić was named Player of the Month.

In September and October 2021, Ilić was named Player of the Month by the votes of the fans.

=== Colorado Rapids ===
On 17 February 2023, Ilić was loaned to Major League Soccer club Colorado Rapids for their 2023 season.

On 15 July 2023, Colorado Rapids made the transfer permanent and signed a two-and-a-half contract with Ilić.

=== Return to Kortrijk ===
On 24 January 2025, Ilić returned to Kortrijk on a two-and-a-half-year deal.

== International career ==
=== Youth ===
Early in his career, Ilić was a member of the Serbian under-16, under-17 and under-18 national team selections. In September 2016, he made his debut for the Serbian under-19 team, being elected for the best goalkeeper of the memorial tournament "Stevan Vilotić - Ćele". Ilić was also invited in the squad for the 2017 UEFA European Under-19 Championship under coach Milan Obradović, where he appeared as the first choice keeper.

=== Senior ===
He made his debut for Serbia national football team on 7 June 2021 in a friendly against Jamaica, and he did not concede a goal in the half he spent on the field. After his debut, during 2021 and 2022, Ilić received several invitations to the national team, but he remained on the bench as a reserve goalkeeper.

== Career statistics ==
=== Club ===
As of 21 October 2023

Appearances and goals by club, season and competition
Club	Season	League			Cup		Continental		Total	
Club	Season	Division	Apps	Goals	Apps	Goals	Apps	Goals	Apps	Goals
Vojvodina	2015–16	Serbian SuperLiga	0	0	0	0	0	0	0	0
Vojvodina	2016–17	Serbian SuperLiga	0	0	0	0	0	0	0	0
Vojvodina	2017–18	Serbian SuperLiga	1	0	0	0	0	0	1	0
Vojvodina	Total		1	0	0	0	0	0	1	0
Cement Beočin (loan)	2014–15	Serbian League Vojvodina	3	0	0	0	—		3	0
Proleter Novi Sad (loan)	2016–17	Serbian First League	7	0	0	0	—		7	0
Voždovac	2018–19	Serbian SuperLiga	29	0	1	0	—		30	0
Voždovac	2019–20	Serbian SuperLiga	26	0	0	0	—		26	0
Voždovac	2020–21	Serbian SuperLiga	5	0	0	0	—		5	0
Voždovac	Total		60	0	1	0	—		61	0
Kortrijk	2020–21	Jupiler Pro League	22	0	0	0	—		22	0
Kortrijk	2021–22	Jupiler Pro League	32	0	0	0	—		32	0
Kortrijk	2022–23	Jupiler Pro League	17	0	0	0	—		17	0
Kortrijk	2023–24	Jupiler Pro League	0	0	0	0	—		0	0
Kortrijk	Total		71	0	0	0	—		71	0
Colorado Rapids (loan)	2023	MLS	3	0	3	0	—		6	0
Colorado Rapids	2023	MLS	10	0	0	0	0	0	10	0
Colorado Rapids 2 (loan)	2023	MLS Next Pro	3	0	0	0	—		3	0
Career total			158	0	4	0	0	0	162	0

=== International ===
As of 13 June 2022

Serbia
Year	Apps	Goals
2021	1	0
Total	1	0
