= Michael Edwards (soccer) =

American soccer player (born 2000)

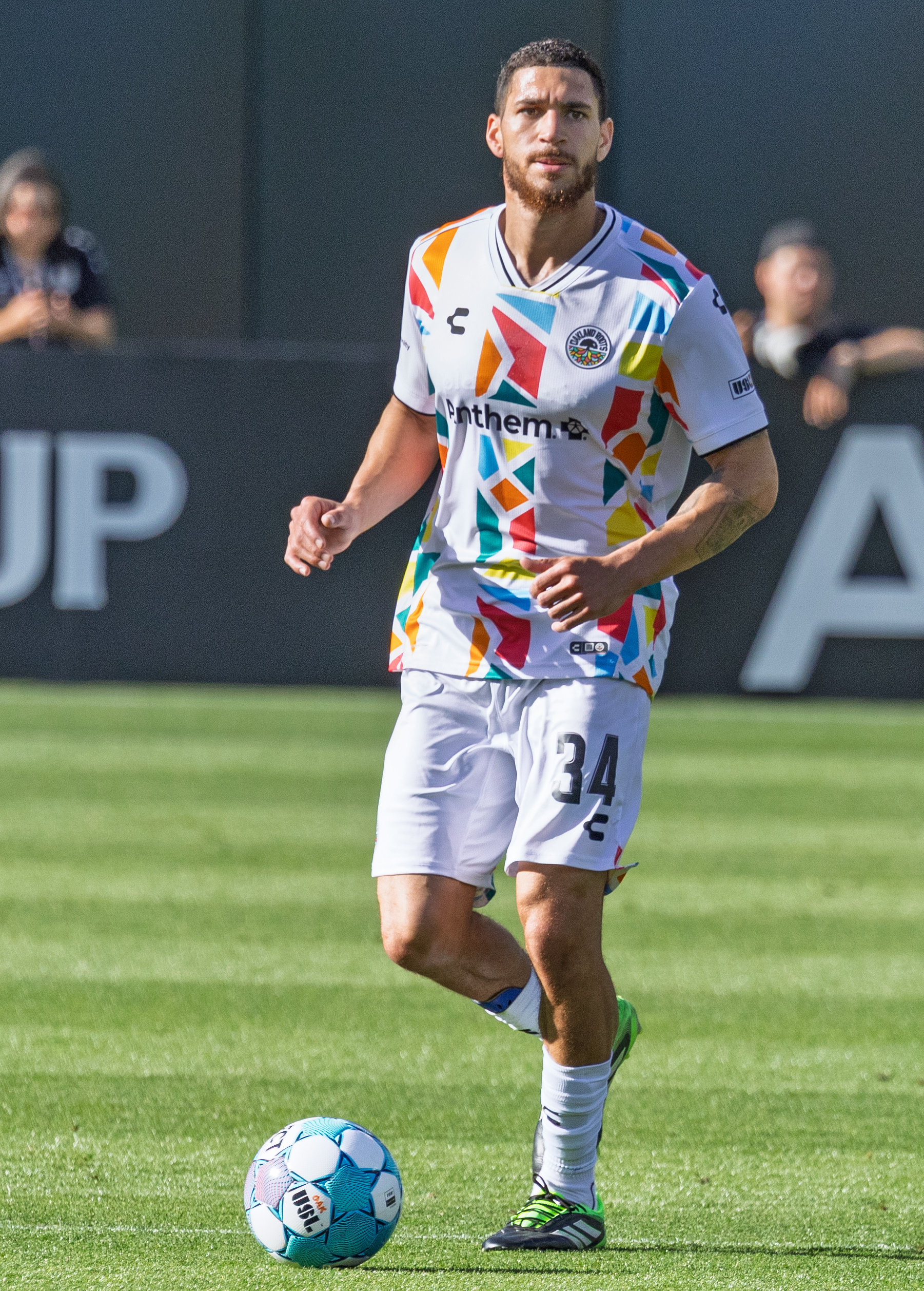
- Edwards with the Oakland Roots in 2026

Personal information
- Full name: Michael Joseph Edwards
- Date of birth: November 27, 2000 (age 25)
- Place of birth: Woodbridge, Virginia, US
- Height: 6 ft 4 in (1.92 m)
- Position: Defender

Team information
- Current team: Oakland Roots SC
- Number: 34

Youth career
- –2018: D.C. United
- 2018–2019: VfL Wolfsburg

Senior career*
| Years | Team | Apps | (Gls) |
| 2019–2020 | VfL Wolfsburg II | 17 | (0) |
| 2021–2025 | Colorado Rapids | 4 | (1) |
| 2021 | → Colorado Springs Switchbacks (loan) | 24 | (2) |
| 2022– | → Colorado Rapids 2 (loan) | 39 | (2) |
| 2022 | → Colorado Springs Switchbacks (loan) | 7 | (0) |
| 2023 | → San Antonio FC (loan) | 0 | (0) |
| 2025 | → Charleston Battery (loan) | 12 | (0) |
| 2026– | Oakland Roots SC | 26 | (0) |
- * Club domestic league appearances and goals as of 11:00, 10 November 2026 (UTC)

Michael Joseph Edwards (born November 27, 2000) is an American professional soccer player who plays as a defender for USL Championship club Oakland Roots SC.

== Career ==
Born in Woodbridge, Virginia, Edwards began his career in the youth academy of D.C. United. In 2018, Edwards impressed some scouts during a Florida tournament and had trials at German clubs Freiburg and 1. FC Köln before joining VfL Wolfsburg. Edwards made his debut for VfL Wolfsburg II on August 10, 2019, against Hamburger SV II.

On March 4, 2021, Edwards returned to the United States and joined Major League Soccer club Colorado Rapids who acquired his rights from D.C. United. A few weeks later, on March 29, Edwards was loaned to the Colorado Springs Switchbacks. He made his professional debut for the club on May 1 against San Antonio FC, starting in the 3–0 defeat.

On November 10, 2022, his contract option was declined by Colorado. He re-signed with the club for their 2023 season. On November 26, 2025, Edwards' contract option was once again declined.

On 26 January 2026, Oakland Roots announced they had signed Edwards to a contract for the 2026 season.

== Career statistics ==
As of match played November 7, 2021

Appearances and goals by club, season and competition
| Club | Season | League | | | National cup | | Continental | | Total | |
| Club | Season | Division | Apps | Goals | Apps | Goals | Apps | Goals | Apps | Goals |
|---|---|---|---|---|---|---|---|---|---|---|
| Colorado Rapids | 2021 | MLS | 0 | 0 | 0 | 0 | 0 | 0 | 0 | 0 |
| Colorado Springs Switchbacks (loan) | 2021 | USL | 24 | 2 | 0 | 0 | — | | 24 | 2 |
| Career total | | | 24 | 2 | 0 | 0 | 0 | 0 | 24 | 2 |
