= Sidnei Tavares =

Portuguese footballer (born 2001)

Personal information
- Full name: Sidnei Wilson Vieira David Tavares
- Date of birth: 29 September 2001 (age 25)
- Place of birth: Cascais, Portugal
- Height: 1.88 m (6 ft 2 in)
- Position: Defensive midfielder

Team information
- Current team: Wisła Płock (on loan from Blackburn Rovers)
- Number: 5

Youth career
- 2008–2010: Carib SSFC
- 2010–2021: Leicester City

Senior career*
Years	Team	Apps	(Gls)
2021	Leicester City	2	(0)
2021–2024	Porto B	38	(0)
2023	→ Colorado Rapids (loan)	5	(0)
2024–2025	Moreirense	29	(1)
2025–	Blackburn Rovers	13	(0)
2026–	→ Wisła Płock (loan)	0	(0)

International career
2018–2019	Portugal U18	6	(0)
2019	Portugal U19	2	(0)
- * Club domestic league appearances and goals as of 3 April 2026

Sidnei Wilson Vieira David Tavares (Portuguese: [ˈsid.nej ˈwil.sɔn vi.ˈej.ɾɐ da.ˈvid ta.ˈva.ɾɨʃ]; born 29 September 2001) is a Portuguese professional footballer who plays as a defensive midfielder for Ekstraklasa club Wisła Płock, on loan from club Blackburn Rovers.

== Club career ==
Tavares is a product of the Leicester City academy, which he joined in 2010 at the age of 9 from local grassroots club Carib SSFC and signed his first professional contract in 2019. He made his debut in the UEFA Europa League as an 80th-minute substitute during a 2–0 defeat against Slavia Prague on 25 February 2021. The following week, on 3 March 2021, he made his first Premier League appearance as a 77th-minute substitute during a 1–1 draw against Burnley. Tavares made his first Premier League start against Brighton on 6 March 2021. In that match, he produced an on-target volley from the edge of the box, only to see it saved by opposing goalkeeper Robert Sánchez.

In 2021 Tavares signed for Porto B where he made sporadic appearances. In 2023 he joined Major League Soccer side Colorado Rapids on loan until the end of June 2024. In the summer of 2024 Tavares moved to Portuguese top flight side Moriense for an undisclosed fee. He made his debut on 11 August 2024 against Farense, receiving two yellow cards and therefore being sent off in the second half. He scored his first goal against Estrela Amadora in a 1–1 draw after coming off the bench, scoring in the 78th minute.

On 20 June 2025, Tavares joined EFL Championship side Blackburn Rovers on a three-year deal for an undisclosed fee.

On 1 September 2026, Tavares joined Polish club Wisła Płock on loan for the 2026–27 season with the option to join permanently.

== International career ==
Tavares is a Portuguese youth international and represented Portugal at U18 and U19 level although he hasn't appeared internationally since 2019. He also has duel nationality with an ability to be able to also play for the Cape Verde national team.

== Personal life ==
Tavares was born in Portugal and is of Cape Verdean descent. He is the cousin of the Portugal international footballer Nani.

== Career statistics ==
As of match played 2 September 2026

Appearances and goals by club, season and competition
Club	Season	League			National cup (Note: Includes Taça de Portugal, Polish Cup)		League cup (Note: Includes Taça da Liga, EFL Cup)		Continental		Total	
Club	Season	Division	Apps	Goals	Apps	Goals	Apps	Goals	Apps	Goals	Apps	Goals
Leicester City	2020–21	Premier League	2	0	0	0	0	0	1 (Note: Appearance(s) in UEFA Europa League)	0	3	0
Porto B	2021–22	Liga Portugal 2	10	0	—		—		—		10	0
Porto B	2022–23	Liga Portugal 2	28	0	—		—		—		28	0
Porto B	2023–24	Liga Portugal 2	0	0	—		—		—		0	0
Porto B	Total		38	0	—		—		—		38	0
Colorado Rapids (loan)	2023	MLS	5	0	—		—		—		5	0
Moreirense	2024–25	Primeira Liga	29	1	3	0	1	0	—		33	1
Blackburn Rovers	2025–26	Championship	13	0	0	0	1	0	—		14	0
Blackburn Rovers	2026–27	Championship	0	0	—		1	0	—		1	0
Blackburn Rovers	Total		13	0	0	0	2	0	—		15	0
Wisła Płock (loan)	2026–27	Ekstraklasa	0	0	1	0	—		—		1	0
Career total			87	1	4	0	3	0	1	0	95	1
