= Kévin Cabral =

French footballer (born 1999)

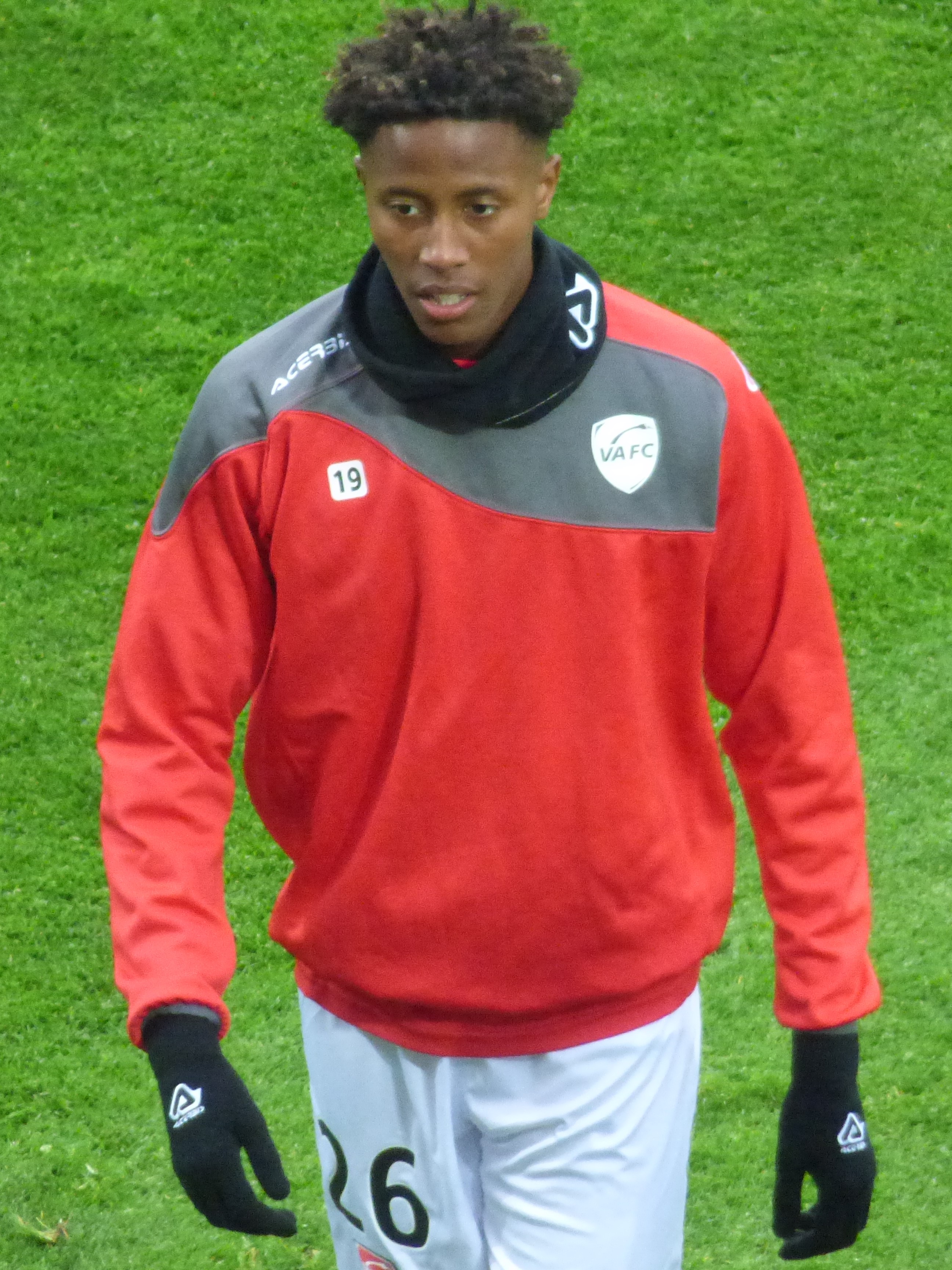
- Cabral with Valenciennes in 2019

Personal information
- Date of birth: 10 July 1999 (age 27)
- Place of birth: Paris, France
- Height: 1.85 m (6 ft 1 in)
- Position: Winger

Team information
- Current team: Red Star
- Number: 91

Youth career
- 2012–2017: Paris Saint-Germain
- 2017–2018: Valenciennes

Senior career*
Years	Team	Apps	(Gls)
2018–2021	Valenciennes	63	(10)
2021–2022	LA Galaxy	61	(6)
2023–2025	Colorado Rapids	68	(7)
2025–	Red Star	27	(4)
- * Club domestic league appearances and goals as of 11 May 2026

Kévin Cabral (born 10 July 1999) is a French professional footballer who plays as a winger for Ligue 2 club Red Star.

== Career ==
=== Valenciennes ===
Cabral was a youth product of Paris Saint-Germain before moving to Valenciennes in 2017. He made his professional debut in a 1–0 Ligue 2 loss to Orléans on 19 October 2018.

=== LA Galaxy ===
On 8 April 2021, Cabral signed a five-year deal with Major League Soccer club LA Galaxy.

=== Colorado Rapids ===
On 8 December 2022, Cabral was traded by LA Galaxy to Colorado Rapids in exchange for up to $1 million in General Allocation Money.

=== Red Star ===
On 30 August 2025, Cabral joined Ligue 2 side Red Star on a free transfer.

== Personal life ==
Born in France, Cabral is of Cape Verdean descent. His twin brother, Rémi, is also a professional footballer.

== Career statistics ==
As of 15 September 2024

Appearances and goals by club, season and competition
Club	Season	League			National cup		Continental		Other		Total	
Club	Season	Division	Apps	Goals	Apps	Goals	Apps	Goals	Apps	Goals	Apps	Goals
Valenciennes	2018–19	Ligue 2	12	2	1	0	—		—		13	2
Valenciennes	2019–20	Ligue 2	22	1	2	0	—		1 (Note: Appearance(s) in Coupe de la Ligue)	0	25	1
Valenciennes	2020–21	Ligue 2	29	7	3	3	—		—		32	10
Valenciennes	Total		63	10	6	3	—		1	0	70	13
LA Galaxy	2021	MLS	28	5	—		—		—		28	5
LA Galaxy	2022	MLS	33	1	4	2	—		2 (Note: Appearance(s) in MLS Cup Playoffs)	0	39	3
LA Galaxy	Total		61	6	4	2	—		2	0	67	8
Colorado Rapids	2023	MLS	27	2	3	0	2 (Note: Appearance(s) in Leagues Cup)	1	—		32	3
Colorado Rapids	2024	MLS	22	5	—		—		—		22	5
Colorado Rapids	Total		49	7	3	0	2	1	—		54	8
Colorado Rapids 2	2023	MLS Next Pro	1	0	—		—		—		1	0
Career total			174	23	13	5	2	1	3	0	192	29
