= Gustavo Vallecilla =

Ecuadorian football player (born 1999)

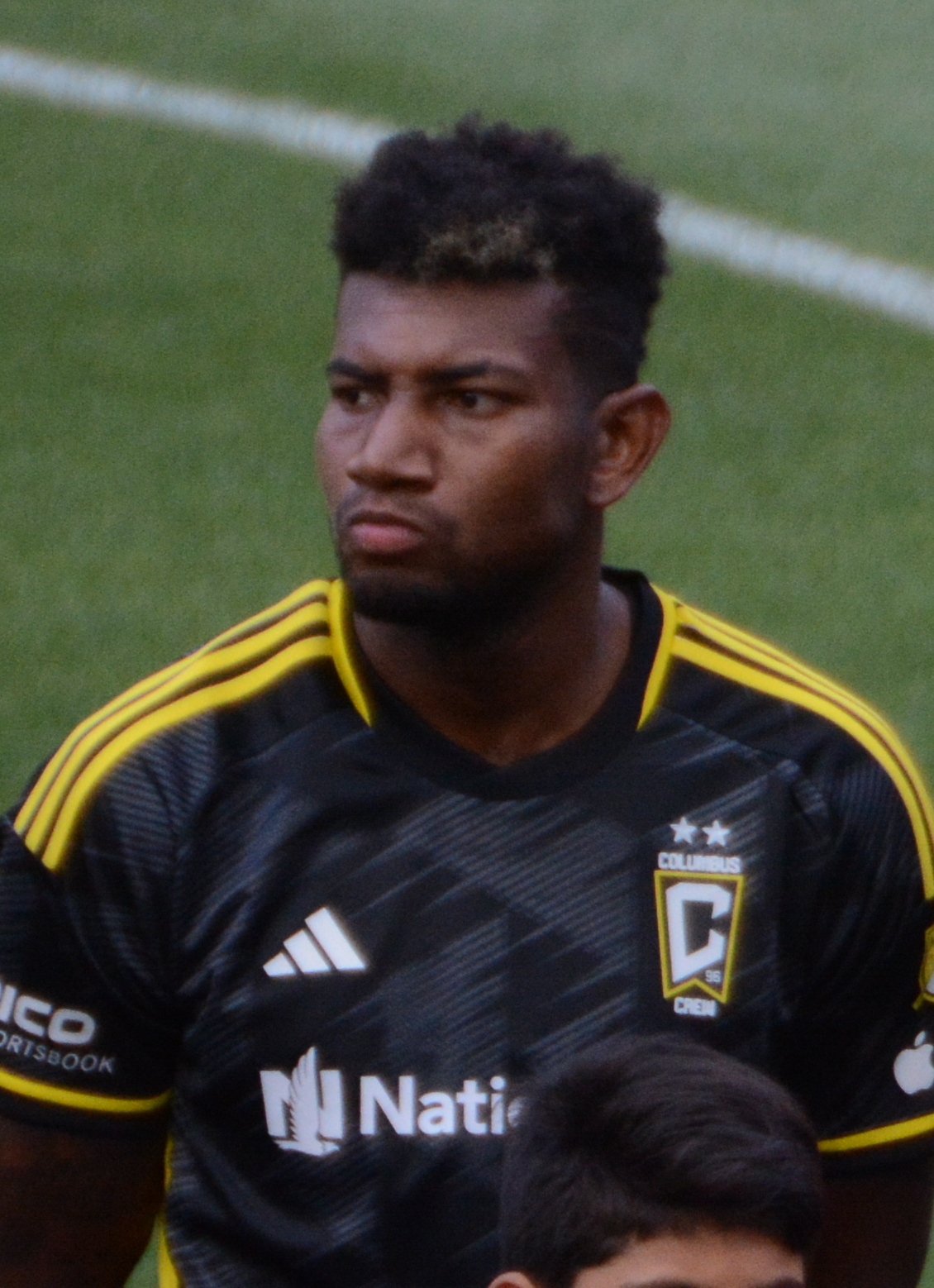
- Vallecilla with the Columbus Crew in 2023

Personal information
- Full name: Exon Gustavo Vallecilla Godoy
- Date of birth: 28 May 1999 (age 27)
- Place of birth: Esmeraldas, Ecuador
- Height: 1.85 m (6 ft 1 in)
- Position: Centre-back

Team information
- Current team: Barcelona S.C.
- Number: 4

Youth career
- 2014–2017: Deportivo Cuenca

Senior career*
Years	Team	Apps	(Gls)
2016–2018	Deportivo Cuenca	17	(0)
2019–2021	Aucas	8	(0)
2020	→ Barcelona S.C. (loan)	14	(1)
2021	→ FC Cincinnati (loan)	25	(2)
2022	FC Cincinnati	0	(0)
2022–2023	Colorado Rapids	12	(0)
2022	→ Colorado Rapids 2	8	(1)
2023	→ Columbus Crew (loan)	12	(0)
2024	Universidad Católica	27	(0)
2025–	Barcelona S.C.	32	(0)

International career^{‡}
2018–2019	Ecuador U20	16	(0)
2020	Ecuador U23	2	(0)
2021–	Ecuador	1	(0)
Medal record
Men's football
Representing Ecuador
FIFA U-20 World Cup
Third place	2019 Poland
- * Club domestic league appearances and goals as of 22 March 2026 ‡ National team caps and goals as of 26 January 2022

Exon Gustavo Vallecilla Godoy (born 28 May 1999) is an Ecuadorian professional footballer who plays as a centre-back for Barcelona S.C..

== Career ==
=== Club career ===
Vallecilla left his home in Esmeraldas, Ecuador at the age of 15 to join Deportivo Cuenca. On 27 November 2016, he made his professional debut for Cuenca against Mushuc Runa S.C. in the Ecuadorian Serie A.

In August 2018 it was reported, that S.D. Aucas had bought 50% of Vallecilla's rights for $80,000, and that he would join the club permanently from the 2019 season, with Cuenca still holding a sell-on percentage.

Joining Aucas for the 2019 season, Vallecilla appeared in five total matches, including an appearance in the quarterfinals of the Serie A playoffs.

For the 2020 season, Vallecilla was loaned out to Barcelona SC with an option to buy. He made 14 league appearances for Barcelona, and also appeared in the 2020 Copa Libertadores. After the season, the club decided not to trigger the option to make his stay permanent.

Vallecilla then returned to Aucas for the 2021 season.

=== FC Cincinnati ===
On 5 April 2021, Vallecilla joined Major League Soccer club FC Cincinnati on loan for the 2021 season with an option to buy. He made his debut for the side on 16 May 2021 in their 3–2 home defeat against Inter Miami. The following match, Vallecilla scored his first goal for Cincinnati in their 2–1 victory over CF Montréal, scoring the equalizer in the 86th minute. His second goal for Cincinnati came against the same opposition on 17 July in their 5–4 defeat at Saputo Stadium.

On 1 December 2021 Cincinnati confirmed, that they had triggered the buying option in Vallecilla's contract, adding him to the squad for the 2022 season.

=== Colorado Rapids ===
On 28 March 2022, Colorado Rapids announced that they acquired Vallecilla for $800,000 in General Allocation Money with extra performance-based fees.

==== Loan to Columbus ====
On 3 March 2023, Vallecilla was loaned to the Columbus Crew for $175,000 in General Allocation Money, with the Crew having a purchase option as well.

=== Universidad Católica ===
At the end of December 2023 it was confirmed, that Vallecilla would return to Ecuador, having signed with Universidad Católica. He left Catolica at the end of the year after 40 games for the club in all competitions.

=== Barcelona SC ===
At the end of December 2024 it was confirmed that Vallecilla returned to his former club, Barcelona S.C., on a one-year deal.

== Career statistics ==
As of match played 21 December 2025

Appearances and goals by club, season and competition
Club	Division	League			National cup		Continental		Total	
Club	Division	Season	Apps	Goals	Apps	Goals	Apps	Goals	Apps	Goals
Deportivo Cuenca	Ecuadorian Serie A	2015	0	0	—		—		0	0
Deportivo Cuenca	Ecuadorian Serie A	2016	1	0	—		—		1	0
Deportivo Cuenca	Ecuadorian Serie A	2017	1	0	—		—		1	0
Deportivo Cuenca	Ecuadorian Serie A	2018	15	0	—		1	0	16	0
Deportivo Cuenca	Total		17	0	0	0	1	0	18	0
Aucas	Ecuadorian Serie A	2019	5	0	2	0	—		7	0
Barcelona S.C.	Ecuadorian Serie A	2020	14	1	0	0	3	0	17	1
Aucas	Ecuadorian Serie A	2021	3	0	0	0	1	0	4	0
Aucas	Total		8	0	2	0	1	0	11	0
FC Cincinnati	Major League Soccer	2021	25	2	—		—		25	2
Colorado Rapids	Major League Soccer	2022	12	0	1	0	—		13	0
Columbus Crew	Major League Soccer	2023	12	0	2	0	2	0	16	0
Universidad Católica	Ecuadorian Serie A	2024	27	0	4	1	9	0	40	1
Barcelona S.C.	Ecuadorian Serie A	2025	29	0	0	0	10	0	39	0
Barcelona S.C.	Total		43	1	0	0	13	0	56	1
Career total			144	3	9	1	26	0	179	4

== Honours ==
Barcelona SC

- Ecuadorian Serie A: 2020

Columbus Crew

- MLS Cup: 2023
