= Daniel Chacón (footballer) =

Costa Rican footballer (born 2001)

Personal information
- Full name: Daniel Alonso Chacón Salas
- Date of birth: 11 April 2001 (age 25)
- Place of birth: Turrialba, Costa Rica
- Height: 1.83 m (6 ft 0 in)
- Position: Defensive midfielder

Team information
- Current team: Alajuelense
- Number: 17

Senior career*
Years	Team	Apps	(Gls)
2017–2022	Cartaginés	105	(4)
2022–2023	Colorado Rapids 2	3	(0)
2022	→ Cartaginés (loan)	11	(1)
2023–2024	Colorado Rapids	0	(0)
2023	→ Alajuelense (loan)	11	(1)
2024	Colorado Rapids 2	5	(0)
2025–	Alajuelense	2	(0)

International career^{‡}
2022–	Costa Rica	10	(0)
- * Club domestic league appearances and goals as of 11 May 2025 ‡ National team caps and goals as of 30 January 2023

Daniel Alonso Chacón Salas (born 11 April 2001) is a Costa Rican professional footballer who plays for Alajuelense and the Costa Rica national team.

== Club career ==
Chacón joined up with C.S. Cartaginés as a youngster and made his senior debut for the club on 19 November 2017 as a 16-year-old. He scored a first goal for the club on 27 September 2020 against Saprissa in a 2–1 victory. In 2020 he was linked with a move to Portuguese side G.D. Estoril Praia however the transfer fell through. With his contract running out in 2022 Chacón was again linked with a move away, with interest reportedly coming from rival Liga FPD club Saprissa as well as from an unnamed Belgian side. In June 2022, Colorado Rapids 2 announced the signing of Chacón at the end of his contract with Cartaginés in the following month. His contract with Colorado lasts through the 2023 season. General manager Brian Crookham describing him as "one of the most talented players in an up-and-coming generation of Costa Rican players." In July 2022, Chacón was loaned back to Cartaginés for the remainder of the season, ending in October. On 3 July 2023, it was announced Chacón would join Colorado Rapids's Major League Soccer roster on a deal until the end of the 2025 season and was immediately loaned to Alajuelense until the end of the season. Chacón and Colorado mutually agreed to terminate his contract at the club on 4 February 2025.

== International career ==
Chacón represented his country at the 2017 FIFA U-17 World Cup. He made his debut for the senior Costa Rica side at 20 years-old, appearing as a substitute on 20 January 2022 during a 0–0 draw against Mexico. He made his first start for the national team on 30 March 2022 against the USA. On 14 June 2022, Chacon appeared as a substitute in the match where his country sealed qualification for the 2022 FIFA World Cup by beating New Zealand 1–0 to win the intercontinental playoff held in Qatar.
