= Colorado Rapids 2 =

American soccer club in Colorado

- Full name: Colorado Rapids 2
- Nickname: Rapids 2
- Founded: December 6, 2021; 4 years ago
- Stadium: Denver Soccer Stadium; Denver, Colorado
- Capacity: 2,000
- General manager: Brian Crookham
- Head coach: Erik Bushey
- League: MLS Next Pro
- 2025: 3rd, Western Conference; Playoffs: Runners-up
- Website: www.coloradorapids.com/rapids2
Home colors	Away colors

The Colorado Rapids 2 is a professional soccer club based in Denver, Colorado area that competes in the MLS Next Pro league, the third division of American soccer. The team is owned by, and operates as the reserve team of, Major League Soccer club Colorado Rapids. The team was announced as a founding member of MLS Next Pro on December 6, 2021.

== History ==
On December 6, 2021, the Colorado Rapids were announced as one of 21 clubs participating in the inaugural season of MLS Next Pro, a professional development league launched by Major League Soccer. The team, named Colorado Rapids 2, serves as a developmental affiliate of the Rapids' senior squad.

On February 10, 2022, Rapids 2 announced former academy coach Erik Bushey as head coach and former Trinidad and Tobago international player Brian Haynes as assistant coach. Following the 2022 season, Haynes departed the club, and former Colorado Rapids player Collen Warner served as interim assistant coach. Warner was later hired as a permanent assistant coach ahead of the 2024 season.

Brian Crookham, concurrent with his role as Director of Player Personnel for the Rapids organization, serves as the team's general manager.

On February 22, 2022, Dillon Serna was unveiled as the club's first rostered player. Serna played for the Rapids first team as a homegrown player from 2013–2019.

Colorado Rapids 2 were one of nine MLS Next Pro teams to compete in the 2024 U.S. Open Cup as part of an agreement between MLS and the United States Soccer Federation to restructure entry in the tournament. The team won their first round match against local amateur side Azteca FC 3–0 before losing to USL League One team Northern Colorado Hailstorm in the second round.

In July 2023, Daniel Chacón became the first Rapids 2 player to sign an MLS deal when he signed with the MLS side through the 2025 season.

== Players and staff ==
=== Roster ===
As of September 5, 2025

Note: Flags indicate national team as defined under FIFA eligibility rules; some limited exceptions apply. Players may hold more than one non-FIFA nationality.

No.	Pos.	Nation	Player
35	DF	CAN	James Cameron
37	DF	AUS	Charlie Harper
39	MF	COL	Luis Garcia (on loan from C.A. Independiente de La Chorrera)
40	FW	SEN	Mamadou Billo Diop
42	MF	USA	Josh Copeland
44	MF	USA	Chris Aquino

No.	Pos.	Nation	Player
45	DF	USA	Jabari De Coteau
49	MF	USA	Nathan Tchoumba
51	GK	USA	Zackory Campagnolo
54	MF	USA	Vincent Rinaldi
57	DF	USA	Rogelio Garcia
61	GK	USA	Bryan Dowd (on loan from FC Cincinnati 2)
62	DF	USA	Grant Gilmore

Signed to name team contract with Colorado Rapids.
Colorado Rapids Academy Player.

=== Team management ===
Team management
General Manager	Brian Crookham
Head Coach	Erik Bushey
Assistant Coach	Collen Warner
Director of Team Operations	Padraic Farrell
Goalkeeping Coach	Brandyn Bumpas

Last updated: January 18, 2025

== Team records ==
=== Season-by-season ===
As of September 18, 2022

Season	MLS Next Pro											Playoffs	US Open Cup	Top Scorer	
Season	P	W	D	L	GF	GA	GD	Pts	PPG	Conf.	Overall	Playoffs	US Open Cup	Player	Goals
2022	24	7	6	11	33	56	-23	31	1.29	9th	17th	Did not qualify	Did not enter *	(United States) Dantouma Toure	8
2023	28	19	5	4	70	37	+33	66	2.36	1st	1st	Conference Finals	Did not enter *	(France) Rémi Cabral	19
2024	28	6	4	18	37	54	-17	23	0.82	14th	28th	Did not qualify	Second Round	(United States) Marlon Vargas	10
2025	28	15	5	8	55	40	+15	51	1.82	3rd	8th	Runners-up	Did not enter *	(Senegal) Mamadou Billo Diop	16
2026	28	4	7	17	28	52	-24	21	0.75	14th	28th	Did not qualify	Did not enter *	(United States) Josh Copeland	5

=== Head coaches record ===
As of September 6, 2026

- Includes Regular season, US Open Cup, & Playoffs

Name	Nationality	From	To	P	W	D	L	GF	GA	Win%
Erik Bushey	United States	February 10, 2022	Present	143	55	29	59	239	249	38.46

== Honors ==
- MLS Next Pro Regular Season
  - Champions: 2023
- MLS Next Pro Western Conference
  - Champions (Playoffs): 2025

== See also ==
- Colorado Rapids U-23
- MLS Next Pro
