= Telfer =

Telfer is a surname, principally of Scottish origin, deriving from Taille-fer (see: Taillefer), the Old French nickname for a strong man or ferocious warrior (taille(r) meaning 'to cut' and fer meaning 'iron'). It is sometimes linked with the surname Telford, although the two names have distinct and unrelated origins.

Notable people with the surname include:

- Alexander Telfer-Smollett (1884–1954), British army officer and politician
- Bob Telfer (1904–1981), Scottish-Australian soccer player, referee, coach and administrator
- Charlie Telfer (born 1995), Scottish footballer
- Chris Telfer, American politician and accountant
- Colin Telfer (born 1947), Scottish rugby union player
- David Telfer (born 1988), Ghanaian footballer
- Don Telfer (born 1961), Canadian rower
- Evelyn Telfer, Scottish biologist and professor
- Garry Telfer (1965–2007), Scottish footballer
- George Telfer (born 1955), English footballer
- Ian Telfer, Canadian mining executive
- Jay Telfer (1947–2009), Canadian musician and songwriter
- Jim Telfer (born 1940), Scottish rugby union player and coach
- John Telfer (1873–1938), British auctioneer and philatelist
- Margaret Alison Telfer (1904–1974), Australian university administrator
- Matthew Telfer (born 1994), cybersecurity expert and former cybercriminal
- Michelle Telfer (born 1974), Australian gymnast
- Nancy Telfer (born 1950), Canadian choral conductor, composer and educator
- Paul Telfer (actor) (born 1979), Scottish actor
- Paul Telfer (footballer) (born 1971), Scottish footballer
- Richard J. Telfer, American educator
- Robert Sutherland Telfer, American actor
- Ryan Telfer (born 1994), Trinidad and Tobago footballer
- Wendy Frew (née Telfer, born 1984), New Zealand netball player
- William Telfer (disambiguation), multiple people
