= Harrison Afful =

Ghanaian footballer (born 1986)

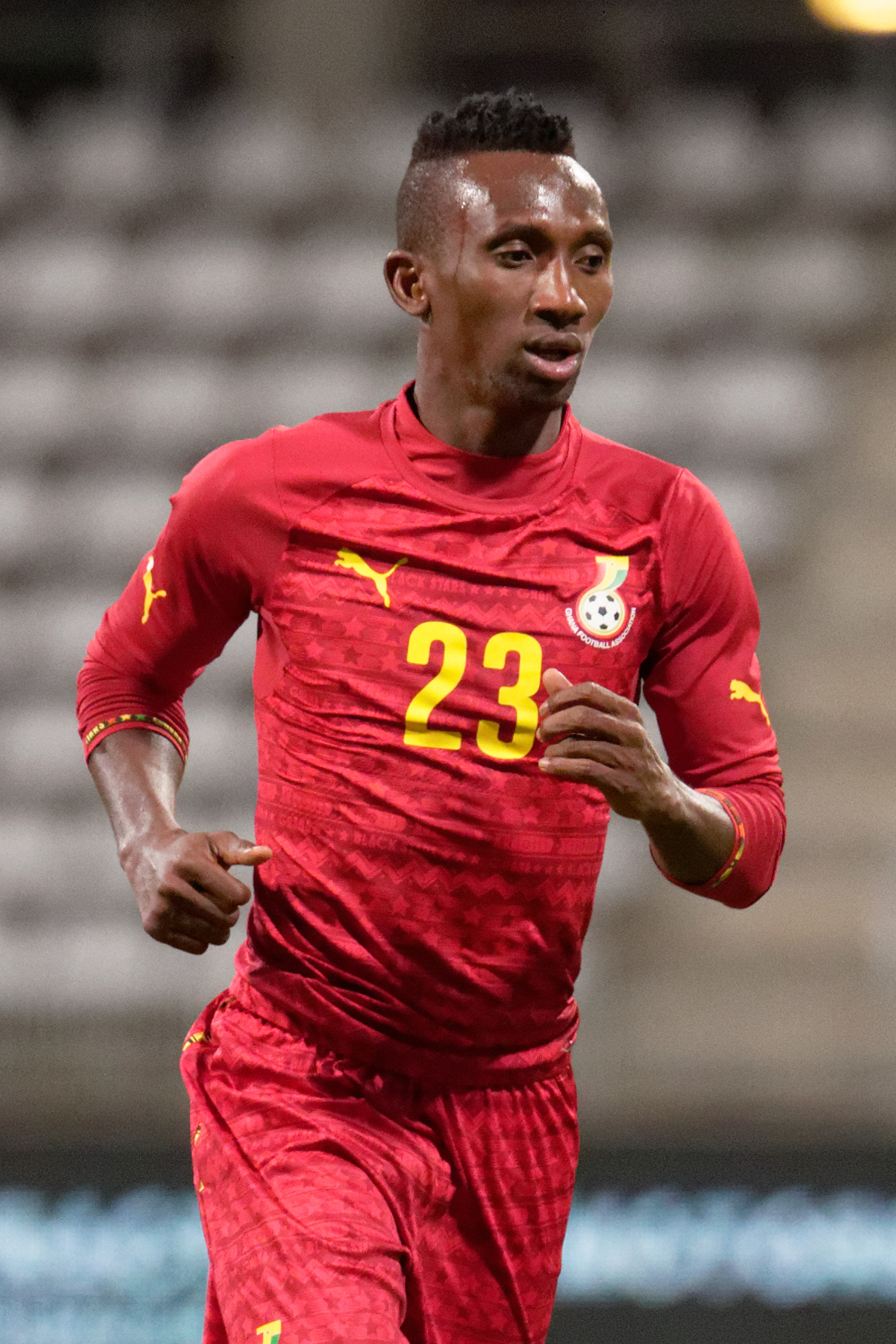
- Afful with Ghana in 2015

Personal information
- Full name: Harrison Afful
- Date of birth: 24 July 1986 (age 40)
- Place of birth: Tema, Ghana
- Height: 1.68 m (5 ft 6 in)
- Position: Fullback

Youth career
- –2005: Feyenoord Academy

Senior career*
Years	Team	Apps	(Gls)
2005–2009	Feyenoord Academy	148	(11)
2007–2009	→ Asante Kotoko (loan)		(1+)
2009–2015	Espérance de Tunis	118	(11)
2015–2021	Columbus Crew	164	(6)
2022–2023	Charlotte FC	21	(0)
2024	Michigan Stars	0	(0)

International career^{‡}
2006	Ghana U20	6	(1)
2009	Ghana A'	8	(0)
2008–2018	Ghana	84	(0)
Medal record
Ghana
Third place	Africa Cup of Nations	2008
Runner-up	Africa Cup of Nations	2010
Runner-up	Africa Cup of Nations	2015
- * Club domestic league appearances and goals as of 4 January 2023 ‡ National team caps and goals as of 18 November 2018

Harrison Afful (born 24 July 1986) is a Ghanaian former footballer who played as a fullback. He appeared previously for Feyenoord Academy, Espérance de Tunis, and Columbus Crew and spent time on loan at Asante Kotoko.

Afful came through the youth setup at the Feyenoord Academy, spending his first two professional seasons with the academy's senior team. He then moved on loan to Asante Kotoko, spending two seasons with the Porcupines and winning the Ghana Premier League in 2007–08. After four years of professional football, Afful left Ghana for the first time to join Espérance de Tunis of the Tunisian Ligue Professionnelle 1. He played the next six seasons with Tunis, appearing for the club more than 180 times. Tunis won four league titles during Afful's time there, appeared in three CAF Champions League finals, and won the 2011 CAF Champions League Final; Afful scored the only goal over the two legs. In the summer of 2015, Afful moved to the United States and signed for Columbus, helping the club reach MLS Cup 2015 in his first season.

At the international level, Afful made his Ghanaian debut at the 2008 Africa Cup of Nations, helping Ghana to a third-place finish at that tournament. He appeared for the Black Stars at four more AFCON tournaments, finishing as runners-up in 2010 and 2015. He was called up to Ghana's squad for the 2014 FIFA World Cup, appearing twice during the tournament. Afful captained his nation for the first time in a friendly against Congo on 1 September 2015.

== Early life ==
Born in Tema, Ghana, Afful grew up 23 kilometres (14 miles) away in Nungua. He used to watch the Ghana national team on television before becoming a professional footballer.

== Club career ==
=== Feyenoord Academy ===
Afful joined the Feyenoord Academy after being discovered as a youth by Sam Arday. He rose through the youth ranks to the first team, appearing 148 times and scoring 11 goals in all competitions for the academy. Afful underwent a trial with Feyenoord, the parent club of the academy, in 2008. However, after four weeks, he was released without a contract and was informed that he was deemed too small. He also spent time training with Stabæk, Helsingborgs IF, and Mamelodi Sundowns but returned to Ghana after failing to land a contract.

==== Loan to Asante Kotoko ====
Following the Feyenoord Academy's relegation to the Division One League, Afful returned to the Ghana Premier League with a loan to Asante Kotoko. The move was made possible through a clause in Jordan Opoku's contract. He had been bought by Kotoko the year before, and his contract allowed Asante Kotoko to choose one player to bring in on loan from the academy. They exercised it by choosing Afful.

Afful impressed Kotoko head coach Bashir Hayford with his performance during a 10-minute cameo in a friendly match, allowing him to break into the first team after initially appearing to be outside Hayford's plans. He made his league debut for the club and scored in a 3–0 victory against All Blacks on 2 December 2007. Afful was named as the league's Player of the Year as Asante Kotoko won the Ghana Premier League title in 2007–08. Upon the expiration of his initial one-year loan, he returned to the Feyenoord Academy and undertook multiple trials in Europe and elsewhere in Africa. Those trials proved unsuccessful, and Afful returned to Asante Kotoko on loan for the second half of the 2008–09 season. He finished his time on loan with five goals from 68 appearances in all competitions. Upon the expiration of his loan deal, Kotoko reportedly opened talks for a permanent transfer, but were unable to reach a deal with the academy.

=== Espérance de Tunis ===
==== 2009–2010: Early career in Tunisia ====
On 25 August 2009, Afful officially signed a three-year contract with Tunisian club Espérance de Tunis (EST). He had trained with the club prior to the announcement and had scored a goal in a friendly match, helping convince Tunis to complete the signing. He made his debut for EST on 12 September, playing the full 90 minutes in a 4–0 victory over CS Sfaxien. Afful scored his first two goals for the club in a three-match span in the spring of 2010, tallying against CA Bizertin on 28 April and ES Hammam-Sousse on 15 May. He finished the season with two goals from 23 appearances in all competitions as Tunis claimed their second consecutive Tunisian Ligue Professionnelle 1 (CLP-1) title.

==== 2010–2013: Champions League success ====
In his second season at Espérance de Tunis, Afful did not play a large role in league play. He appeared 17 times without a goal as the Blood and Gold claimed their third consecutive league title, but did start in the Tunisian Cup final as Tunis defeated Étoile du Sahel. Instead, he became a fixture in the Tunis squad in 2010 CAF Champions League play. Afful made his debut in the tournament on 16 July 2010, appearing in Group A play against ES Sétif. He went on to appear in every game of the tournament from the group stage on, helping lead EST to the 2010 CAF Champions League Final against TP Mazembe. Afful played 90 minutes in the first leg in a 5–0 defeat for Tunis. He scored in the 24th minute of the second leg, his first-ever goal in the competition, but Tunis could only manage a 1–1 draw and were defeated on aggregate. On the season, Afful appeared 31 times in all competitions and scored once.

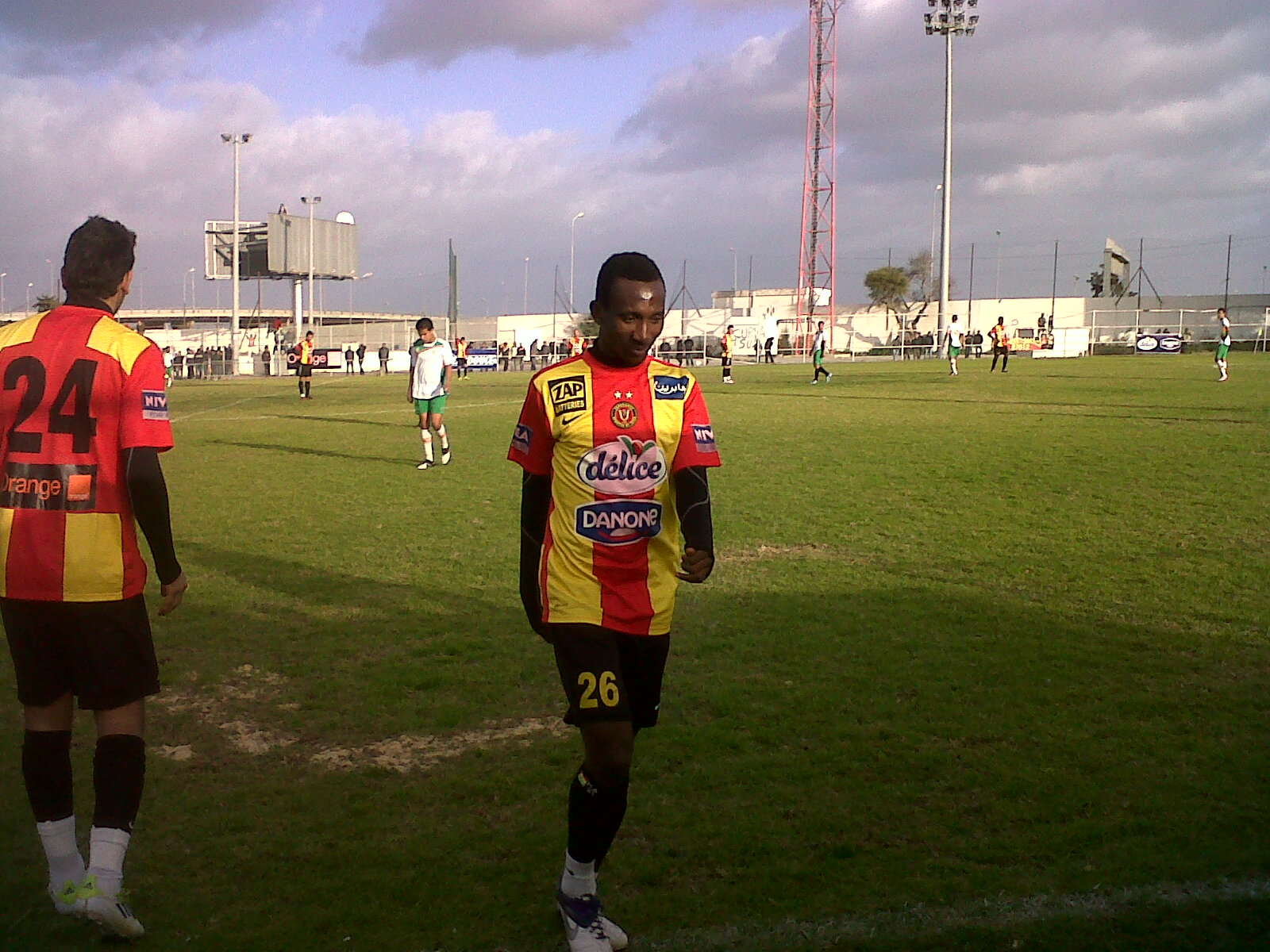
Afful scored twice in five CAF Champions League Final appearances with Tunis.

Just as in the prior season, Afful played sparingly in the CLP-1: he appeared in 16 league matches without scoring as Tunis rolled to a fourth consecutive league crown. In 2011 CAF Champions League play, Afful again played a headlining role as Tunis advanced to the continental final for the second consecutive year. He came off the bench in the first leg of the 2011 CAF Champions League Final, replacing Wajdi Bouazzi in the 90th minute of a draw with Wydad Casablanca. Afful started in the second leg, playing at right back at the Stade 7 November. In the 22nd minute, he placed a left-footed, curling shot into the upper corner, a goal that gave Tunis a 1–0 victory and the second Champions League title in club history. By virtue of winning the Champions League, Tunis qualified for the 2011 FIFA Club World Cup. Afful appeared off the bench in the quarterfinals against Al Sadd and started the fifth place match against Monterrey. He played 31 times in all competitions, scoring once, during the course of the season.

Although Afful's contract with Espérance de Tunis expired at the end of June, he signed a three-year contract extension on 2 July 2012. With his contract situation resolved, he found his scoring boots in CLP-1 play, scoring goals against ES Zarzis on 21 November, JS Kairouan on 8 December, and Club Africain on 31 March 2013. Afful again played a vital role for EST in the Champions League, helping the Blood and Gold advance to their third consecutive final to take on Al Ahly. He played 73 minutes in the first leg of the 2012 CAF Champions League Final, helping Tunis earn a 1–1 draw but was suspended for the second leg due to yellow card accumulation. With Afful watching from the stands, Tunis lost the second leg by a 2–1 scoreline. He appeared 28 times in all competitions on the campaign, scoring three goals.

==== 2013–2015: Final seasons at EST ====
2013–14 was the busiest season of Afful's career to date: he appeared in a career-high 38 matches in all competitions and scored six goals. In CLP-1 play, he scored twice before the turn of the year, tallying against Stade Tunisien on 3 November and LPS Tozeur on 25 December. He continued his form after new head coach Ruud Krol was hired, scoring in the return fixture against Tunisien on 15 February. Afful then tallied the game-winning goal against Sfaxien on 2 April, helping Tunis claim their fourth league title in his five seasons at the club. He added ten more appearances in the 2013 CAF Champions League, but EST were defeated by Orlando Pirates in the semifinals and denied a fourth consecutive trip to the final. Afful then began the 2014 CAF Champions League by scoring in both the first and second qualifying rounds, helping Tunis advance over Gor Mahia and Real Bamako, respectively.

In April 2014, Afful was the subject of transfer interest, with reports from his native Ghana claiming that he was the subject of an offer from Olympique de Marseille. The French club were reportedly looking to sign Afful before the 2014 FIFA World Cup began, in an effort to keep his price down. Following the domestic season, however, ES Tunis announced that Afful would not leave the club until after the World Cup at the earliest. He continued to attract interest after the World Cup, with a reported 13 European clubs battling for his signature; however, it was Al Wahda, of the United Arab Emirates, who reportedly won the race for his services. He underwent a medical, but the club canceled the deal after ES Tunis broke off communication and he thus returned to Tunisia.

After any potential move in the summer fell through, Afful returned to Tunis to begin the 2014–15 season. On 31 August, in a match away to Bizertin, he scored two goals to help EST claim a 3–1 victory. Afful would not score again for the remainder of the league season as Espérance placed third in the CLP-1, their lowest league finish during Afful's time at the club. With his contract set to expire at the end of June 2015, he was rumored to be re-signing a two-year deal with the Blood and Gold. In the final month of his contract, he appeared twice in the 2015 CAF Confederation Cup. However, Afful and the club could not agree on a new contract, and he departed after six seasons, 183 appearances, and 17 goals with Tunis.

==== FIFA case ====
Following his departure from Tunis at the end of June 2015, Afful was reportedly not paid the remaining salaries and bonuses owed to him by the club. He filed a case with FIFA over the issue, and in May 2016 the organization sided with Afful in the case. FIFA ordered Espérance to pay the remaining monies within one month of the ruling date; if they failed to do so, they would be docked six points in league play. FIFA also ruled that if the debts persisted, Tunis would be relegated to the Tunisian Ligue Professionnelle 2. The club also paid a fine in the tens of thousands of Swiss francs to FIFA".

=== Columbus Crew ===
==== 2015–2016: Initial years in Columbus ====
After his contract with Tunis expired at the end of June, Afful joined Major League Soccer (MLS) club Columbus Crew SC as a Discovery Signing. He was recommended to the club by ex-Ghanaian international Joe Addo, who had played alongside Crew head coach Gregg Berhalter in the 1990s. Although the transfer was announced on 30 July 2015, Afful was only added to the roster after securing his visa and thus had to wait to make his club debut until 19 August. He started a 2–2 draw with New York City FC, playing 60 minutes before being replaced by Hector Jiménez. Afful missed several matches while on international duty but returned to start every game in Crew SC's run to MLS Cup 2015. Against Portland Timbers in the final, he played the full 90 minutes and picked up a yellow card as Columbus was defeated 2–1. Afful made 14 appearances in his first season in Columbus and had his contract option picked up by the club on 7 December.

Afful was rumored to be leaving Columbus ahead of the 2016 season, with reports from his native Ghana claiming that he would be joining Mersin İdman Yurdu when his contract expired at the end of 2015. No transfer came to pass, however, and he returned to Columbus for his first full season with the Black and Gold. Although Afful again missed time while appearing with Ghana, he did find the time to score his first MLS goal: a 54th-minute strike against Toronto FC on 13 July. He added two more goals in the final month of the season, scoring in a victory over Chicago Fire on 1 October and a defeat against New York Red Bulls in the season finale on 16 October. He did pick up a red card in a 1–1 draw with D.C. United on 16 July, but the card was rescinded by the league two days later. Afful finished the season with three goals and three assists from 30 appearances.

==== 2017–2019: Injuries and club struggles ====
Afful's 2017 season was marred by injuries: a knee laceration in March, a sliced nerve in his hand in April, a thigh strain in late summer, and a sprained foot in October. Although he did not score during the regular season, he found the back of the net in the 2017 MLS Cup Playoffs. In the first leg of the conference semifinals against New York City FC, Afful scored three minutes into stoppage time to give Columbus a 4–1 victory; that goal would end up being the difference as the club advanced by a 4–3 aggregate scoreline. He finished the season with one goal from 29 appearances and again had his contract option picked up by Crew SC.

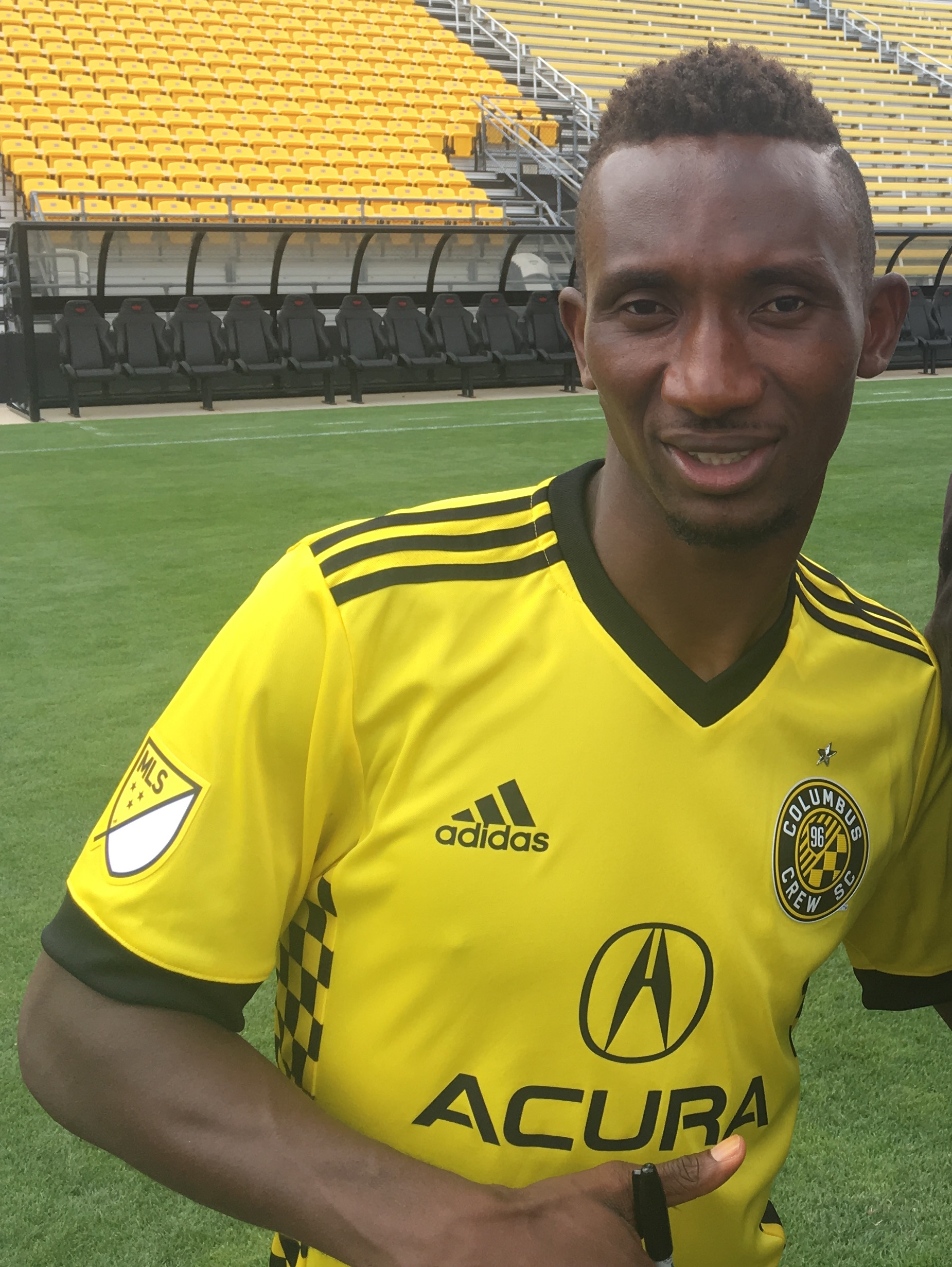
Afful with the Columbus Crew in 2017

Afful bounced back in 2018 with two goals and six assists from 35 total appearances. In one three-game span in July and August, he provided an assist in each match and helped Columbus claim three consecutive victories. Afful tallied the third-most shots on the team, behind only Gyasi Zardes and Pedro Santos but tallied just two goals: against San Jose Earthquakes in April and New York City FC in September. He added an assist in the knockout round of the 2018 MLS Cup Playoffs, helping Columbus to advance on penalties over D.C. United.

After an injury-free 2018, Afful was limited to just 24 appearances in all competitions over the course of the 2019 season. In a home match against Atlanta United FC on 30 March, he collided with countryman Jonathan Mensah and suffered a fractured jaw. Afful missed eleven matches due to the injury, returning on 11 June and making his U.S. Open Cup debut in a victory over Pittsburgh Riverhounds SC. Although he did not score on the year, Afful provided two assists over a three-match span in August. His contract expired following the season, but the Crew announced that the sides were still in negotiations; nine days later, they agreed a deal for Afful to return to the club on a new contract.

==== 2020–2021: Trophies with the Crew ====
In the first season of his new contract, Afful appeared in both games for the Crew before the 2020 season was halted due to the COVID-19 pandemic. Upon the resumption of the season, he made three appearances at the MLS is Back Tournament as Columbus was eliminated in the round of 16 by Minnesota United FC. Afful then played all but one game during the remainder of the regular season, scoring a goal in a 2–1 loss against Orlando City SC on 4 November. In the 2020 MLS Cup Playoffs, he started every game as the Crew advanced to MLS Cup 2020, the second time that Afful appeared in the league's championship match. Against Seattle Sounders FC in the final, he provided an assist to Lucas Zelarayán on the game-winning goal as the Crew claimed a 3–0 victory. Afful scored one goal in 26 total appearances on the season and won his first trophy since arriving in Columbus in 2015. Following the season, the Crew picked up the option on his contract, ensuring his return for a seventh season in Columbus.

In what turned out to be his final season with the Crew, Afful made 30 appearances in all competitions in 2021. He missed the opening match of the season, a CONCACAF Champions League fixture against Real Estelí, after what was reported to be a stint in COVID-19 protocol, but returned to play against the same team a week later. Afful was a fixture in the lineup into the fall, providing two assists but also seeing a red card in a Hell is Real Derby draw with FC Cincinnati in July. He came off the bench in the 2021 Campeones Cup, helping the Crew to defeat Cruz Azul and claim their second trophy during his time at the club. However, the Crew had purchased Afful's intended successor during the summer transfer window, and after suffering a knee sprain in early October, Steven Moreira took over Afful's spot in the starting lineup. At the end of the season, Afful's contract expired and his time in Columbus came to a close. He made 188 appearances and scored seven goals across all competitions during his seven seasons with the Crew.

=== Charlotte FC ===
After leaving Columbus, Afful signed with MLS expansion club Charlotte FC on 17 December 2021. He inked a one-year deal with a club option for a further season. He re-signed with Charlotte ahead of the 2023 season.

On October 30, 2023, Charlotte FC announced that it had declined Afful's contract option for 2024.

=== Michigan Stars ===
On 16 April 2024, Afful appeared for National Independent Soccer Association side Michigan Stars FC in a Lamar Hunt US Open Cup fixture against Detroit City FC.

== International career ==
Afful debuted in the Ghanaian international setup at the under-20 level, appearing six times and scoring a goal for the side. He struggled to lock down a place on the team outside 2006, however, and later said that "my unsuccessful attempts at the junior national teams [were] not as a result of poor performance".

=== Early career and AFCON tournaments ===
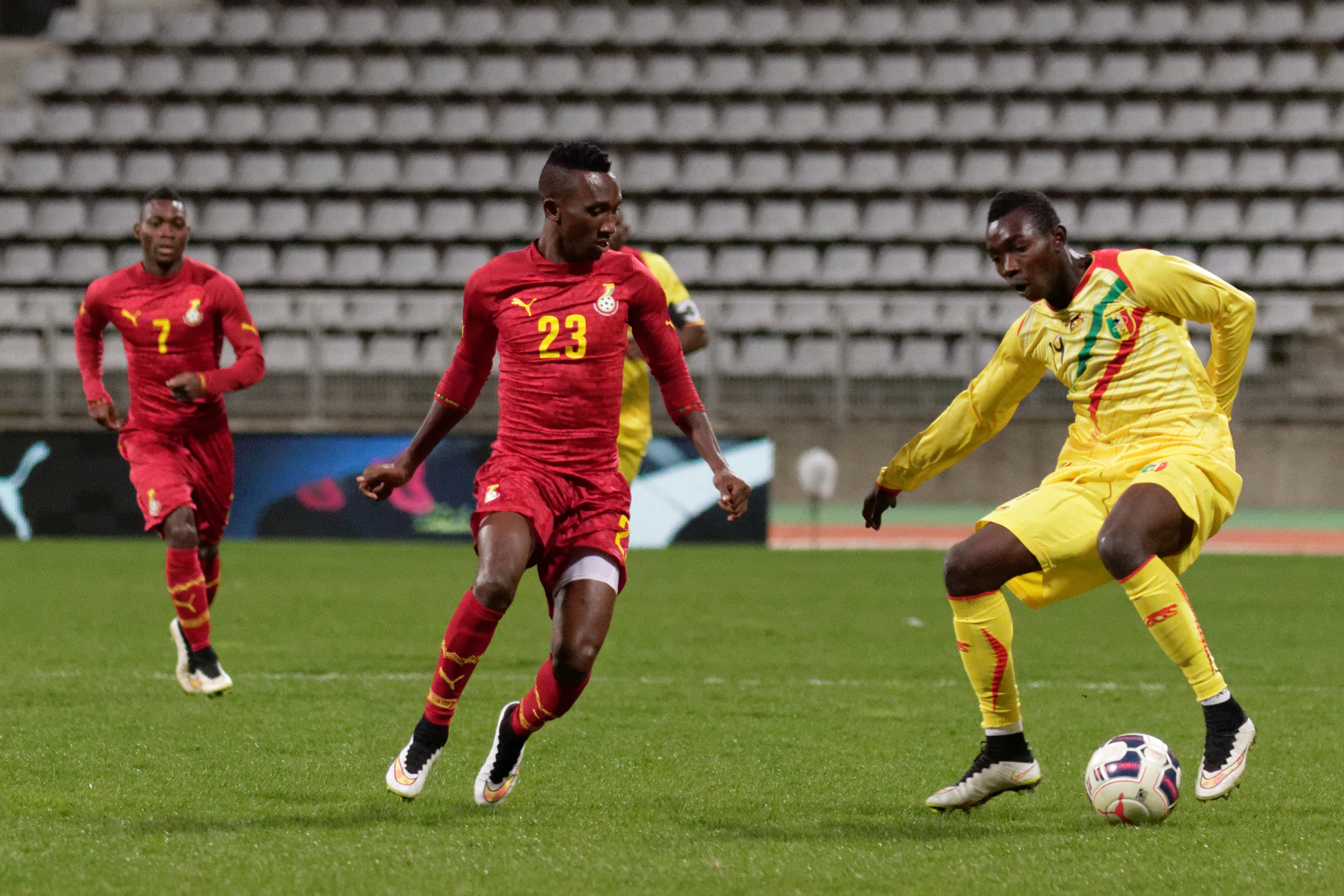
Afful has won three medals from Africa Cup of Nations tournaments.

Afful made his debut for the senior national team at the 2008 Africa Cup of Nations. He had not been named in the 40-man preliminary squad but was called up to the final squad by coach Claude Le Roy. Afful earned his first cap on 9 February in the third place match, entering as an 89th-minute substitute in the 4–2 victory over Ivory Coast. Although Le Roy resigned in May 2008, Afful continued to earn playing time under caretaker Sellas Tetteh and new manager Milovan Rajevac: he appeared 10 times in qualifying for the 2010 FIFA World Cup, helping the Black Stars qualify for the final tournament with games to spare. He was then called up to the 2010 Africa Cup of Nations, and although Ghana made a run to the 2010 Africa Cup of Nations Final he did not make an appearance at the tournament. Afful was left off Ghana's squad for the 2010 World Cup, failing to even crack the Black Stars' preliminary roster. After appearing against South Africa in a friendly in August, Afful did not earn another cap for nearly two years.

=== Buildup to and the 2014 World Cup ===
Afful was recalled to the Black Stars in June 2012, as James Kwesi Appiah brought him in for 2014 FIFA World Cup qualifiers against Lesotho and Zambia. After appearing just twice in qualifying for the tournament, Afful was called up to the Ghanaian squad for the 2013 Africa Cup of Nations, alongside his club teammate Emmanuel Clottey. Afful appeared five times at the tournament and played 90 minutes in the third place playoff as the Black Stars were defeated 3–1 by Mali.

On 12 May 2014, Afful was named in Ghana's 30-man preliminary squad for the 2014 FIFA World Cup. Head coach James Kwesi Appiah then named him to the final squad on 2 June. Afful appeared twice as Ghana were eliminated in the group stage, providing an assist in a draw against eventual world champions Germany on 21 June.

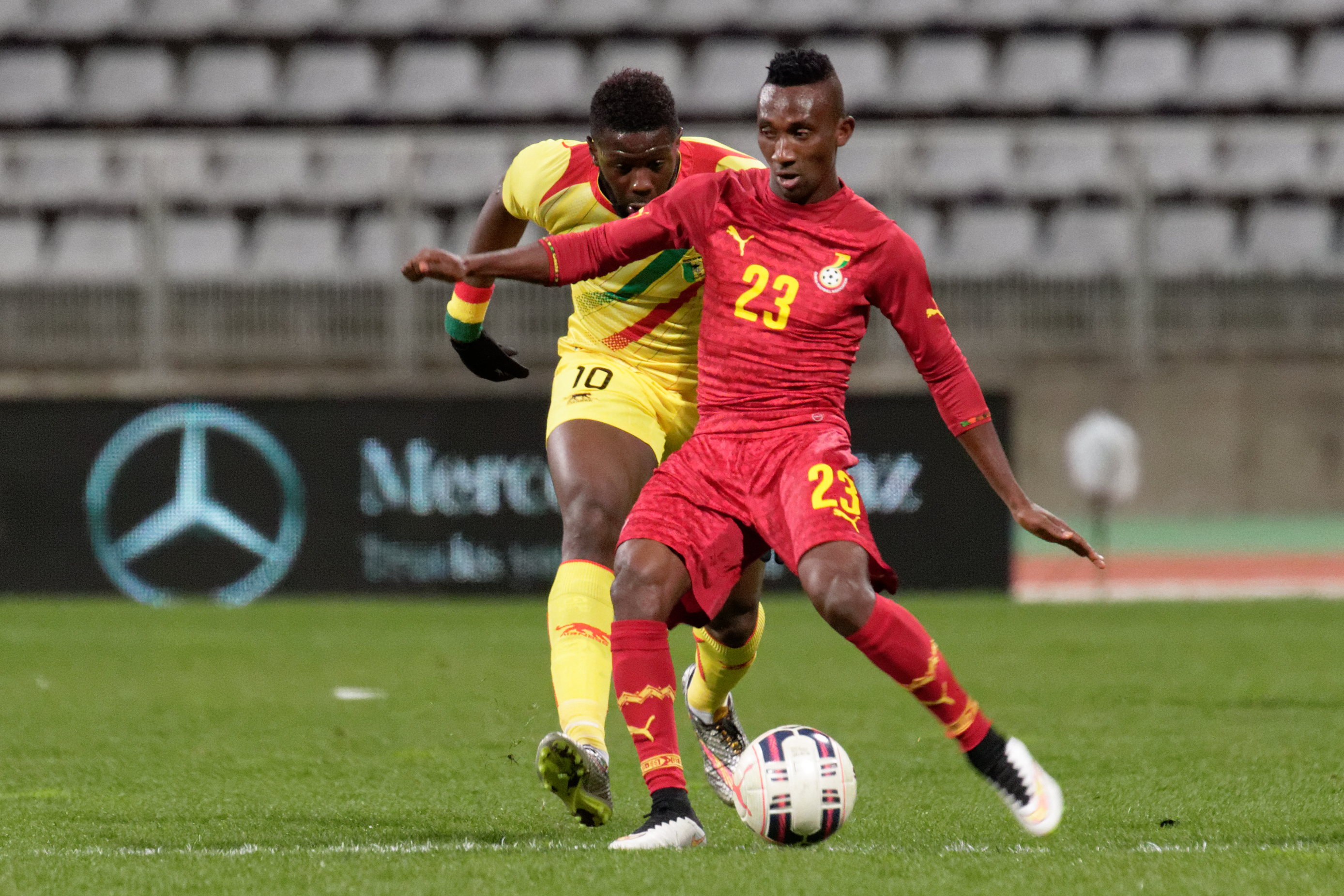
Afful captained Ghana for the first time at the age of 29.

=== AFCON success and World Cup qualifying failure ===
After appearing in all six matches in Ghana's 2015 Africa Cup of Nations qualification run, Afful was named to the squad for the final tournament on 7 January 2015. He appeared in every match at the tournament, helping the Black Stars reach the final against Ivory Coast. Afful scored his attempt in the penalty shootout as the eighth taker, but Ghana were defeated 9–8 on spot kicks; for the second time, he finished as an AFCON runner-up. Later that year, Afful captained Ghana for the first time, leading the team to a 3–2 victory over Congo on 1 September. He was back in an AFCON squad two years later, earning a place in the Ghanaian team for the 2017 Africa Cup of Nations. Afful played every minute in the tournament, helping the Black Stars to a fourth-place finish after falling to Burkina Faso in the third place match.

Although Ghana had appeared in three consecutive World Cups, the Black Stars failed in their bid to qualify for the 2018 FIFA World Cup. Afful appeared six times in qualifying, including four matches in the third round as Ghana placed third in their group and missed out on the World Cup for the first time since 2002. In the fall of 2018, he returned to the Ghana team for the first time since the qualifying failure and made two appearances in 2019 Africa Cup of Nations qualifying as the Black Stars finalized a spot at the final tournament. Afful was not named to Ghana's roster for the tournament as he was dealing with an injury suffered at the club level.

== Career statistics ==
=== Club ===
As of 4 January 2023

Appearances and goals by club, season and competition
Club	Season	League			Cup (Note: Includes the Tunisian Cup and U.S. Open Cup)		Continental		Other		Total	
Club	Season	Division	Apps	Goals	Apps	Goals	Apps	Goals	Apps	Goals	Apps	Goals
Feyenoord Academy (Note: Detailed season-by-season statistics for this club are not known.)	2005	Ghana Premier League			—		—					
Feyenoord Academy	2006–07	Ghana Premier League			—		—		—			
Feyenoord Academy	2008	Division One League	0	0	—		—		—		0	0
Feyenoord Academy	2009	Division One League	0	0	—		—		—		0	0
Feyenoord Academy	Total				0	0	0	0			148	11
Asante Kotoko (loan)	2007–08	Ghana Premier League		1+	—		3 (Note: Appearances in the CAF Confederation Cup)	0	1+ (Note: Appearance in the SWAG Cup)	0+		
Asante Kotoko (loan)	2008–09	Ghana Premier League			—		0	0				
Asante Kotoko (loan)	Total			1+	0	0	3	0	1+	0+	68	5
ES Tunis	2009–10	Tunisian Ligue Professionnelle 1	18	2	1	0	0	0	4 (Note: Appearances in the North African Cup of Champions)	0	23	2
ES Tunis	2010–11	Tunisian Ligue Professionnelle 1	17	0	2	0	12 (Note: Appearances in the CAF Champions League)	1	—		31	1
ES Tunis	2011–12	Tunisian Ligue Professionnelle 1	16	0	0	0	13	1	2 (Note: Appearances in the FIFA Club World Cup)	0	31	1
ES Tunis	2012–13	Tunisian Ligue Professionnelle 1	17	3	—		11	0	—		28	3
ES Tunis	2013–14	Tunisian Ligue Professionnelle 1	27	4	1	0	10	2	—		38	6
ES Tunis	2014–15	Tunisian Ligue Professionnelle 1	23	2	0	0	9 (Note: Six appearances and one goal in the CAF Champions League, three appearances and one goal in the CAF Confederation Cup)	2	—		32	4
ES Tunis	Total		118	11	4	0	55	6	6	0	183	17
Columbus Crew	2015	Major League Soccer	9	0	0	0	—		5 (Note: Appearances in the MLS Cup Playoffs)	0	14	0
Columbus Crew	2016	Major League Soccer	30	3	0	0	—		—		30	3
Columbus Crew	2017	Major League Soccer	24	0	0	0	—		5	1	29	1
Columbus Crew	2018	Major League Soccer	32	2	0	0	—		3	0	35	2
Columbus Crew	2019	Major League Soccer	22	0	2	0	—		—		24	0
Columbus Crew	2020	Major League Soccer	21	1	—		—		5 (Note: One appearance in the MLS is Back Tournament knockout stage, four appearances in the MLS Cup Playoffs)	0	26	1
Columbus Crew	2021	Major League Soccer	26	0	—		3 (Note: Appearances in the CONCACAF Champions League)	0	1 (Note: Appearance in the Campeones Cup)	0	30	0
Columbus Crew	Total		164	6	2	0	3	0	19	1	188	7
Charlotte FC	2022	Major League Soccer	21	0	3	1	—		—		24	1
Charlotte FC	2023	Major League Soccer	0	0	0	0	—		0	0	0	0
Charlotte FC	Total		21	0	3	1	0	0	0	0	24	1
Career total			303+	18+	9	1	61	6	26+	1+	611	41

=== International ===
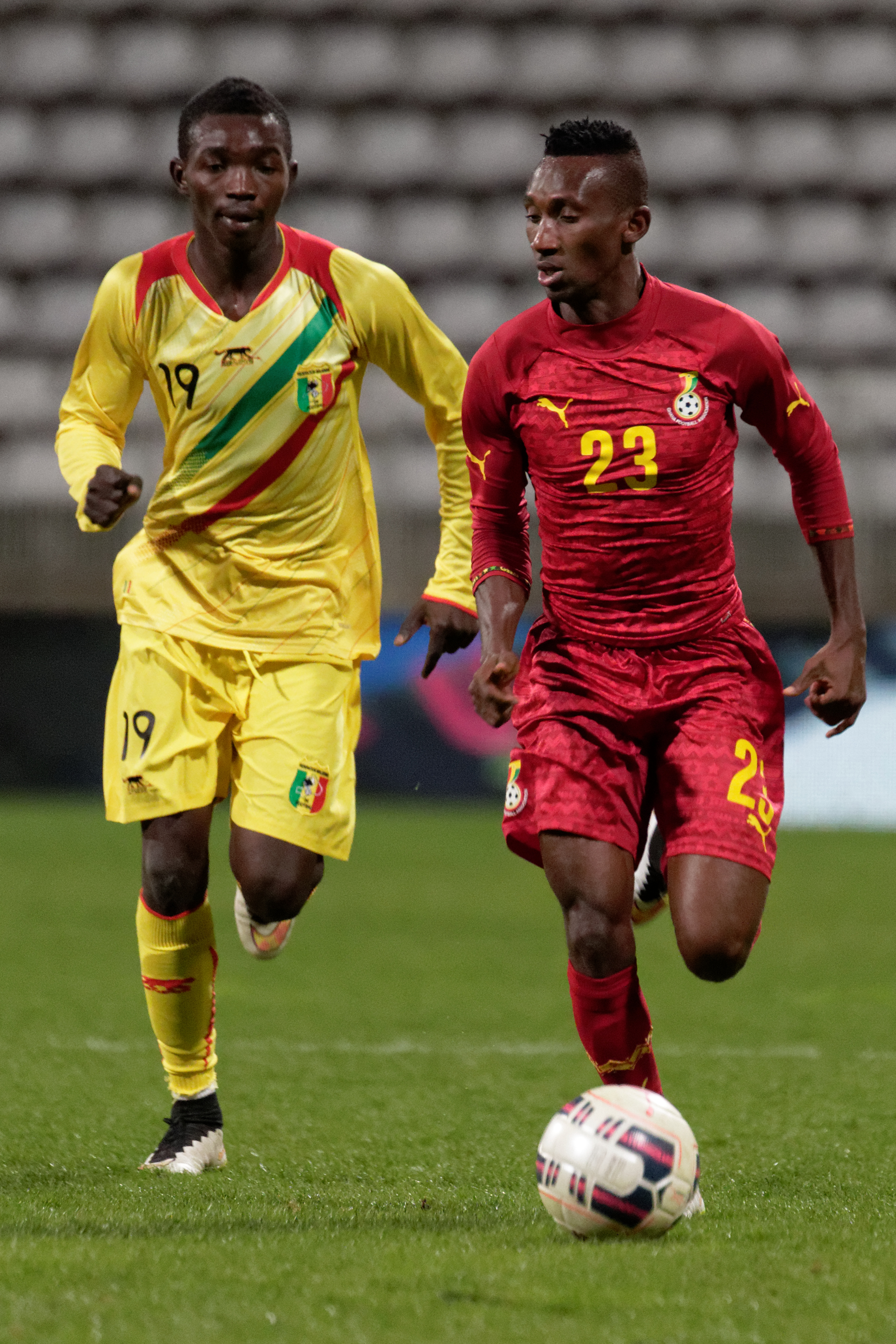
Afful is one of the ten most-capped players in the history of the Ghana national team.

As of 18 November 2018

Appearances and goals by national team and year
National team	Year	Apps	Goals
Ghana	2008	10	0
Ghana	2009	7	0
Ghana	2010	3	0
Ghana	2011	0	0
Ghana	2012	5	0
Ghana	2013	14	0
Ghana	2014	10	0
Ghana	2015	14	0
Ghana	2016	8	0
Ghana	2017	11	0
Ghana	2018	2	0
Total		84	0

== Honours ==
Asante Kotoko

- Ghana Premier League: 2007–08
- SWAG Cup: 2008
- GHALCA President's Cup: 2008

Espérance de Tunis

- Tunisian Ligue Professionnelle 1: 2009–10, 2010–11, 2011–12, 2013–14
- Tunisian Cup: 2010–11
- CAF Champions League: 2011

Columbus Crew

- MLS Cup: 2020
- Campeones Cup: 2021

Individual

- African Nations Championship Best XI: 2009
- CAF Team of the Year: 2011
- Ghana Player of the Year: 2014
- Africa Cup of Nations Team of the Tournament: 2015
