= Mohammed Abu =

Ghanaian professional footballer (born 1991)

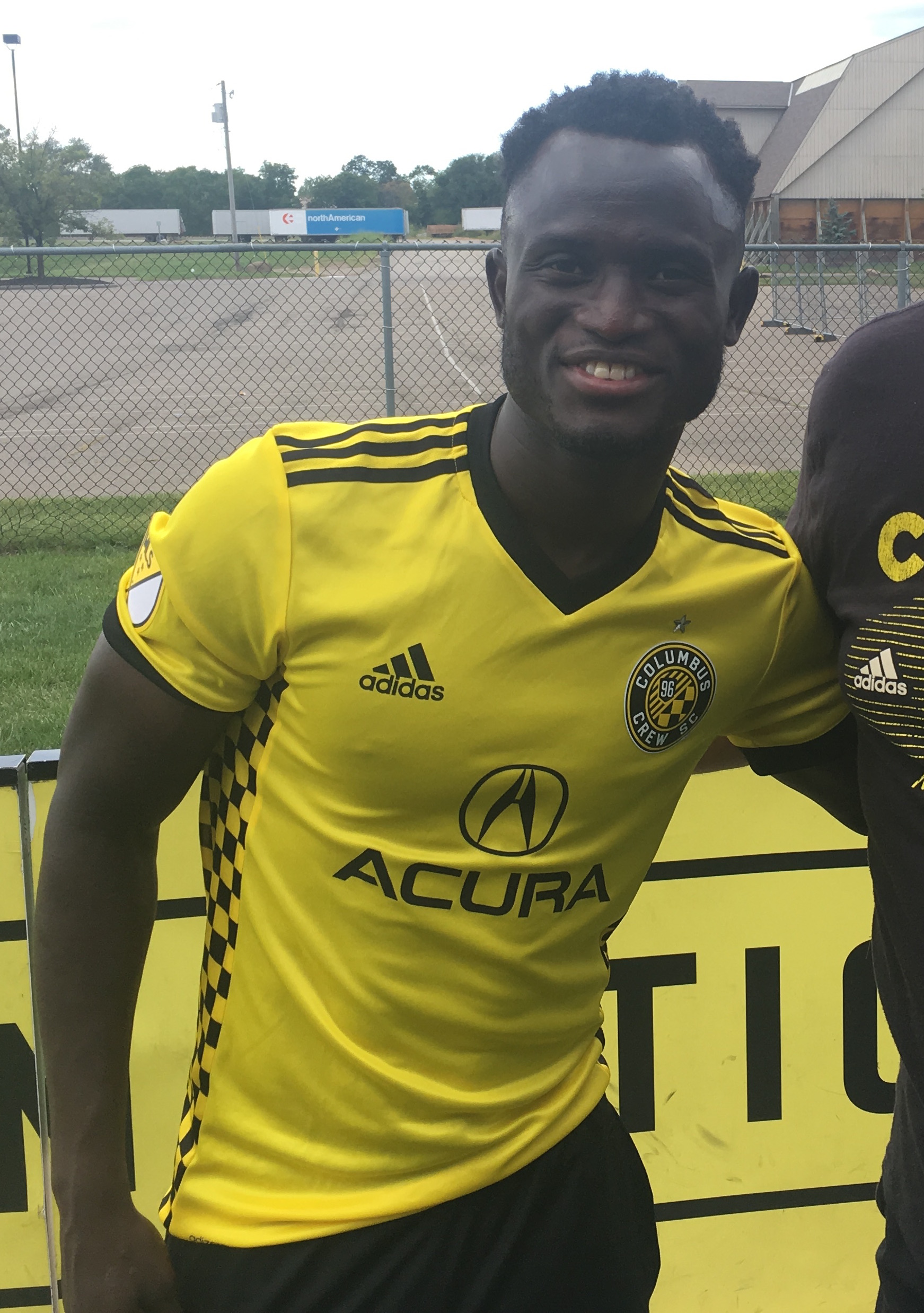
- Abu with Columbus in 2017

Personal information
- Date of birth: 14 November 1991 (age 34)
- Place of birth: Accra, Ghana
- Height: 1.70 m (5 ft 7 in)
- Position: Central midfielder

Youth career
- –2010: Sporting Club Accra

Senior career*
Years	Team	Apps	(Gls)
2010–2014	Manchester City	0	(0)
2010–2011	→ Strømsgodset (loan)	35	(1)
2010–2011	→ Strømsgodset 2 (loan)	2	(0)
2012	→ Eintracht Frankfurt (loan)	0	(0)
2012	→ Strømsgodset (loan)	11	(2)
2012–2013	→ Rayo Vallecano (loan)	1	(0)
2013	→ Lorient (loan)	7	(0)
2013–2014	→ AGF (loan)	0	(0)
2014–2016	Strømsgodset	82	(1)
2016	Strømsgodset 2	1	(0)
2017–2018	Columbus Crew	24	(0)
2018	→ Vålerenga (loan)	10	(0)
2018	→ Vålerenga 2 (loan)	1	(0)
2019–2020	Vålerenga	24	(0)
2020	→ D.C. United (loan)	6	(0)
2021–2024	San Antonio FC	78	(1)

International career^{‡}
2011–2017	Ghana	6	(0)
- * Club domestic league appearances and goals as of 29 March 2024 ‡ National team caps and goals as of 1 July 2017

Mohammed Abu (born 14 November 1991) is a Ghanaian former professional footballer.

He played for Strømsgodset, Rayo Vallecano, Lorient, Columbus Crew SC, and Vålerenga, and also spent time with Manchester City, Eintracht Frankfurt, and AGF. Abu appeared for the Ghana national team.

== Club career ==
=== Manchester City and loans ===
After playing youth football with Sporting Club Accra, Abu signed for English side Manchester City on 31 August 2010.

He was immediately loaned to Norwegian club Strømsgodset until June 2011. This was due to Abu failing to get a work permit to allow him to play in England. Abu made his professional debut against Molde on 13 September 2010, coming on as a 60th-minute substitute, in a 3–1 loss. Abu appeared as an unused substitute in the Norwegian Football Cup Final against Follo, as the club won 2–0.

At the start of the 2011 season, his performances saw him being named in the league's Team of the Week on two occasions. On 29 June 2011, his loan deal with Strømsgodset was extended until December 2011. On 16 October 2011, he scored his first goal for Strømsgodset, in a 1–1 draw against Sogndal. Despite missing three matches throughout the 2011 season, Abu went on to make twenty–eight appearances and score once in all competitions.

In October 2011, Abu signed a new contract with Manchester City, until June 2014. In January 2012, he joined German 2. Bundesliga side Eintracht Frankfurt on loan. Without playing a match, Abu, again, was transferred to Strømsgodset at the end of March. Despite Strømsgodset's best effort to keep the player, it was announced on 12 June 2012 that Abu would be leaving the club at the end of June.

Following this, Abu was expecting to join Belgian side Anderlecht. Instead, he joined Spanish club Rayo Vallecano on loan on 29 August 2012. Abu made his debut for the club, starting and playing 57 minutes before being substituted, in a 3–2 loss against Espanyol. However, Abu suffered a muscle discomfort a month later. In early–January, he returned to his parent club, having made three appearances in all competitions.

Abu joined French club Lorient on loan for the rest of the 2012–13 season on 1 February 2013. He made his debut for the club against Évian Thonon Gaillard, coming on as a 74th-minute substitute, in a 2–1 loss on 16 February 2013.

When his loan spell at FC Lorient came to an end, Abu signed a loan deal until on 31 December 2013 with Danish club AGF on 2 September 2013. However, his time at the club saw the player make no appearances. On 18 December 2013, AGF announced that the club would not be extending his loan spell.

=== Strømsgodset ===
On 21 February 2014, Abu joined Norwegian side Strømsgodset again, this time on a permanent deal and signed a four–year contract with the club. However ahead of the 2014 season, he suffered an injury that it was thought could see him ruled out of the start of the season but he managed to make a recovery from injury. Abu played in both legs of the club's first ever UEFA Champions League match against Steaua București, as Strømsgodset lost 3–0 on aggregate. Despite missing two more matches later in the 2014 season, due to suspensions, Abu went on to make thirty appearances in all competitions.

At the start of the 2015 season, he scored his first goal for the club – his first goal in three years for Strømsgodset – in a 5–0 win against FK Tønsberg in the first round of the Norwegian Cup on 22 April 2015. Abu played in every match following the start of the 2015 season until he was sent–off for a second bookable offence, in a 3–2 loss against Stabæk on 27 June 2015. After the match, manager Bjørn Petter Ingebretsen criticised Abu's sending off, saying the player "was tackled in the leg, he was on the ball, and he bleeds like that." Despite missing two more matches later in the 2015 season, he made thirty–six appearances, scoring twice in all competitions.

During the 2016 season, Abu's performances attracted interest from Major League Soccer clubs, who were considering signing him for the following season. In response, he refused to respond over his future at Strømsgodset. During a 2–0 win against Rosenborg on 30 October 2016, Abu suffered a knee injury and was substituted in the 19th minute, in what turned out to be his last appearance for the club. Despite being absent three times throughout the 2016 season, he went on to make thirty–three appearances in all competitions.

=== Columbus Crew SC ===
On 24 January 2017, Abu moved to America, where he joined Major League Soccer side Columbus Crew SC as a Special Discovery Player. He made his debut for the club in the opening game of the season against Chicago Fire, playing 76 minutes before being substituted, in a 1–1 draw. After making his debut for Columbus Crew, he found himself rotating in and out of the starting line–up. By August, Abu began to make a start in a number of matches for the club. He helped Columbus Crew qualify for the 2017 MLS Cup Playoffs, where the club reached the Conference Finals, losing 1–0 against Toronto FC on aggregate.

In the 2018 season, Abu found his first team opportunities limited at Columbus Crew, due to strong competition. As a result, he found his playing time coming from the substitute bench. In July 2018, Abu suffered a thigh injury that saw him ruled out for months.

=== Vålerenga ===
On 10 August 2018, Abu returned to Norway when he was sent on a season-long loan to Vålerenga. He made his debut for the club, starting the whole game, playing in the defensive midfield position, in a 3–0 win against Tromsø on 19 August 2018. After the match, his debut performance was praised by Vålerenga's captain Daniel Fredheim Holm. After joining the club, Abu quickly established himself in the starting eleven, playing in the defensive midfield position. Despite suffering a knee injury later in the 2018 season, he went on to make eleven appearances in all competitions. During the 2018 season, the deal was made permanent on 4 October 2018.

At the end of the 2019 season, Abu went on to make twenty–six appearances in all competitions. Following his loan spell at D.C. United, his contract with the club was terminated on 18 December 2020 and he announced his intention to return to play in America.

==== D.C. United (loan) ====
On 2 March 2020, Abu was transferred to MLS club D.C. United on a one-year loan with a permanent option.

However, the season was suspended due to the COVID-19 pandemic in North America, following the cancellation of several matches. He made his debut for the club, coming on as an 87th-minute substitute, in a 0–0 draw against FC Cincinnati on 22 August 2020. During a 2–2 draw against Toronto FC on 19 September 2020, he suffered a knee injury and was substituted at half time. After the match, Abu was ruled out for the rest of the season with a knee injury. At the end of the 2020 season, he had made six appearances in all competitions. Following this, his option was declined by D.C. United for the 2021 season.

=== San Antonio FC ===
On 19 July 2021, Abu signed with USL Championship side San Antonio FC.

He announced his retirement on 29 March 2024.

== International career ==
On 9 August 2011, Abu was called up to the Ghana squad for the first time. He made his international debut for Ghana on 8 October 2011, as part of 2012 Africa Cup of Nations qualification against Sudan, and replaced Derek Boateng in the 75th minute of a 2–0 victory for the Black Stars.

Although Abu had appeared just once in qualifying, he was included in Ghana's provisional squad for the 2012 Africa Cup of Nations on 15 December 2011. Abu was selected as part of the final 23-man squad on 11 January 2012. He made his debut in the tournament, coming on as a late substitute, in a 1–0 win against Botswana in the group stage on 24 January 2012.

After appearing at AFCON, Abu would not be called back into the Black Stars setup for more than five years, until he was called up by head coach James Kwesi Appiah for a set of friendlies against Mexico and the United States in June 2017.

== Personal life ==
Growing up, Abu wanted to be a footballer when he was eight years old. In doing so, Abu left his hometown, leaving "his family, friends and security" for Sunyani. There, he joined Sporting Club Accra, joining the academy at twelve years old. According to Tom Vernon, the founder of Sporting Club Accra, he described Abu as "always been confident both on and off the field, always with a smile and a good mood."

Growing up, he said his favourite player is Xabi Alonso and he supported FC Barcelona. Abu later considered Ronny Deila to be a father to him, saying: "Ronny was like a father to me. He took care of me. Take care of me. Cooked for me. Taught me to drive. Ronny is part of my family. The estate was my first professional club. Ronny spent a lot of time on me, both on and off the field so I became a better player. He has played a big role in my career."

== Career statistics ==
=== Club ===
As of 30 September 2018

Club	Season	League			Domestic Cup (Note: Includes the Norwegian Football Cup, Copa del Rey, Coupe de France, and U.S. Open Cup)		League Cup		Continental		Other (Note: All appearances in the MLS Cup Playoffs)		Total	
Club	Season	Division	Apps	Goals	Apps	Goals	Apps	Goals	Apps	Goals	Apps	Goals	Apps	Goals
Manchester City	2010–11	Premier League	0	0	0	0	0	0	0	0	–		0	0
Manchester City	2011–12	Premier League	0	0	0	0	0	0	0	0	0	0	0	0
Manchester City	2012–13	Premier League	0	0	0	0	0	0	0	0	0	0	0	0
Manchester City	2013–14	Premier League	0	0	0	0	0	0	0	0	–		0	0
Manchester City	Total		0	0	0	0	0	0	0	0	0	0	0	0
Strømsgodset (loan)	2010	Tippeligaen	8	0	1	0	–		–		–		9	0
Strømsgodset (loan)	2011	Tippeligaen	27	1	3	0	–		2 (Note: Appearances in the UEFA Europa League)	0	–		32	1
Strømsgodset (loan)	Total		35	1	4	0	0	0	2	0	0	0	41	1
Strømsgodset 2 (loan)	2010	2. divisjon	1	0	–		–		–		–		1	0
Strømsgodset 2 (loan)	2011	2. divisjon	1	0	–		–		–		–		1	0
Strømsgodset 2 (loan)	Total		2	0	0	0	0	0	0	0	0	0	2	0
Eintracht Frankfurt (loan)	2011–12	2. Bundesliga	0	0	0	0	–		–		–		0	0
Strømsgodset (loan)	2012	Tippeligaen	11	2	1	0	–		–		–		12	2
Rayo Vallecano (loan)	2012–13	La Liga	1	0	2	0	–		–		–		3	0
Lorient (loan)	2012–13	Ligue 1	7	0	1	0	0	0	–		–		8	0
AGF (loan)	2013–14	Danish Superliga	0	0	0	0	–		–		–		0	0
Strømsgodset	2014	Tippeligaen	28	0	2	0	–		2 (Note: Appearances in the UEFA Champions League)	0	–		32	0
Strømsgodset	2015	Tippeligaen	27	1	3	1	–		6	0	–		36	2
Strømsgodset	2016	Tippeligaen	27	0	4	0	–		2	0	–		33	0
Strømsgodset	Total		82	1	9	1	0	0	10	0	0	0	101	2
Strømsgodset 2	2016	2. divisjon	1	0	–		–		–		–		1	0
Columbus Crew SC	2017	MLS	20	0	0	0	–		–		3	0	23	0
Columbus Crew SC	2018	MLS	4	0	1	0	–		–		0	0	5	0
Columbus Crew SC	Total		24	0	1	0	0	0	0	0	3	0	28	0
Vålerenga (loan)	2018	Eliteserien	6	0	1	0	–		–		–		7	0
Vålerenga 2 (loan)	2018	2. divisjon	1	0	–		–		–		–		1	0
Career total			170	4	19	1	0	0	12	0	3	0	204	5

=== International ===
As of 1 July 2017

Ghana	Year	Apps	Goals
Ghana	2011	2	0
Ghana	2012	2	0
Ghana	2017	2	0
Ghana	Total	6	0
