= William Telfer =

William or Willie Telfer may refer to:

- William Telfer (academic) (1886–1968), English clergyman and academic
- William Telfer (politician) (1885–1955), Australian politician
- Willie Telfer (footballer, born 1909), Scottish footballer
- Willie Telfer (footballer, born 1925), Scottish footballer
- Willie Telfer (Scottish footballer), Scottish footballer
