= David Accam =

Ghanaian footballer (born 1990)

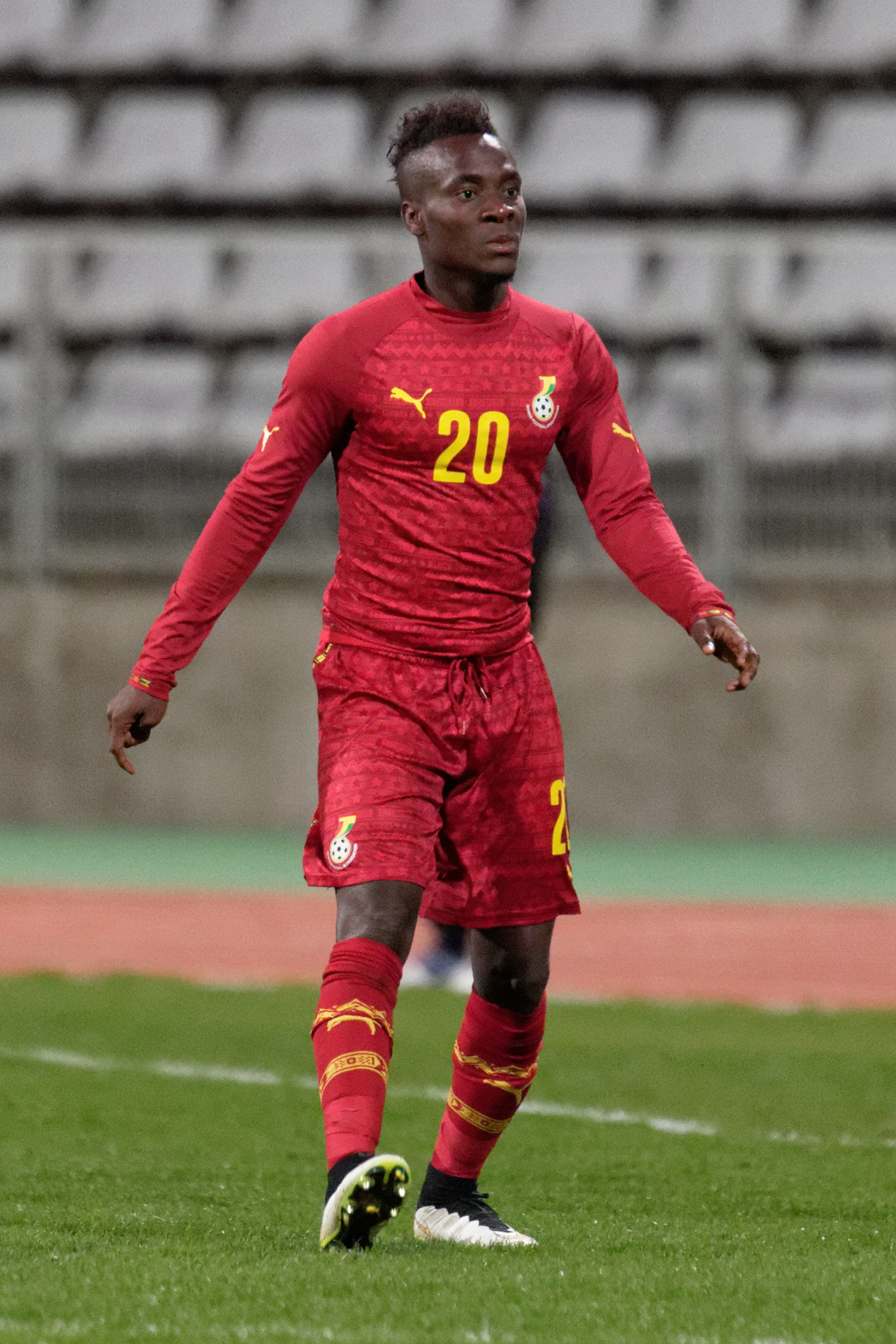
- Accam with Ghana in 2015

Personal information
- Date of birth: 28 September 1990 (age 36)
- Place of birth: Accra, Greater Accra, Ghana
- Height: 1.74 m (5 ft 9 in)
- Position: Winger

Youth career
- 2004–2008: Right to Dream Academy
- 2011–2012: Nike Football Academy

Senior career*
Years	Team	Apps	(Gls)
2009–2010	Ledbury Town	8	(5)
2010–2011	Evesham United	20	(10)
2010–2011	→ Forest Green Rovers (dual registration)	0	(0)
2012	Östersunds FK	14	(9)
2012–2014	Helsingborgs IF	62	(30)
2015–2017	Chicago Fire	78	(33)
2018–2019	Philadelphia Union	31	(5)
2019	Columbus Crew SC	15	(2)
2020–2021	Nashville SC	7	(1)
2021	→ Hammarby IF (loan)	13	(1)
2022	Inter Turku	10	(0)

International career^{‡}
2014–2017	Ghana	11	(1)
Medal record
Representing Ghana
Men's football
Africa Cup of Nations
Runner-up	2015
- * Club domestic league appearances and goals as of 16 October 2022 ‡ National team caps and goals as of 1 July 2017

David Accam (born 28 September 1990) is a Ghanaian former professional footballer who played as a winger. He won 11 caps for the Ghana national team.

== Club career ==
=== Ghana ===
Accam did not belong to a club during the first twelve years of his life. He instead spent his time playing with friends on gravel pitches in the parks of Accra. There, he was spotted by a scout from Ghana-based Right to Dream Academy, where he would spend four years.

=== England ===
In 2008, Accam received a three-year scholarship to study at Hartpury College in England. He combined his time there with playing in the English lower leagues. After signing for English club Ledbury Town, Accam scored on his debut in December 2009. He then played for English club Evesham United during the 2010–11 season while also featuring in the reserve team squad at Forest Green Rovers. The fact that Accam was in England on a student visa prevented him from playing for their first team, or any club in a higher division.

After his time at Evesham United he took part in the Nike "The Chance" competition, where he was one of eight winners who got to spend the 2011–2012 season with Nike Football Academy.

=== Sweden ===
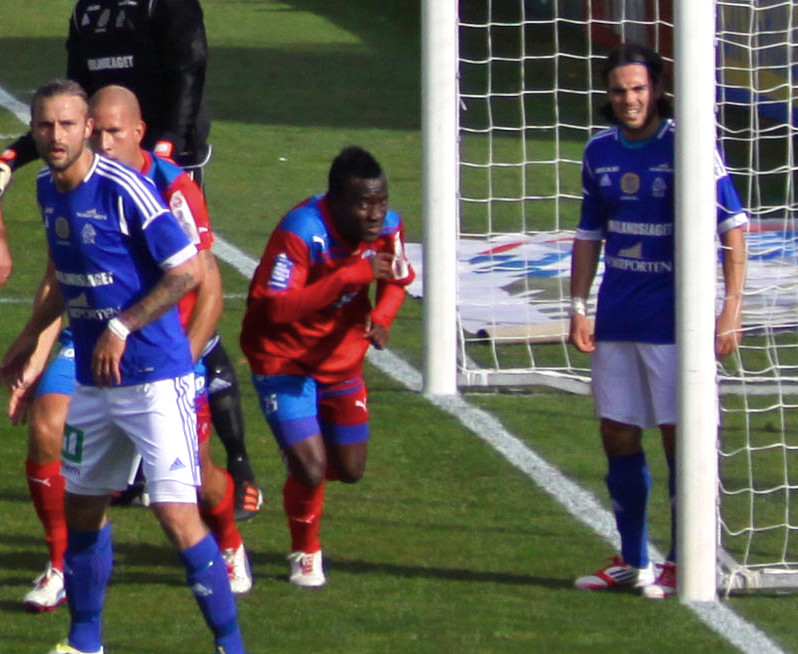
Accam playing for Helsingborg in the 2012 Allsvenskan.

In March 2012, Accam signed for Swedish third tier side Östersund. English manager Graham Potter was in charge of the club and he had already signed two other Ghanaians who were studying with Accam at Hartpury College. And after scouting him at the Nike Academy he brought Accam with him back to Sweden. Accam became an immediate success with his new team and several Allsvenskan clubs became interested in signing him for the summer transfer window.

Accam was then signed by Allsvenskan club Helsingborg in August 2012, and was due to be loaned back to Östersund for the remainder of the season, but was recalled by Helsingborg for an upcoming Champions League qualifying match against Celtic. The 2 million SEK transfer fee paid by Helsingborg was the highest ever for a player from the Swedish third tier.

After scoring seventeen goals in twenty-six appearances, the club announced that Accam would be leaving Helsingborg to pursue opportunities elsewhere. After he made the announcement, Accam was linked with a move away from Tigres, Eintracht Frankfurt and VfB Stuttgart, a number of English clubs and CSKA Moscow. Accam rejected a move to CSKA Moscow, having insisted that Accam hadn't been in talks with the club.

=== Major League Soccer ===
Despite initially denying the move, Accam signed as a designated player with Chicago Fire of Major League Soccer on 19 December 2014.

After three seasons with Chicago, on 19 January 2018 Accam was traded to Philadelphia Union in exchange for $900,000 in Targeted Allocation Money and $300,000 in General Allocation Money. In Accam's first season with Philadelphia, he was hampered by injuries and recorded just one goal in 23 appearances. His form picked up in his second season, scoring 4 goals with 2 assists in 11 games, however, he was traded to Columbus Crew SC on 8 May 2019. On 16 May, it was announced that Accam would be traded to Nashville SC, effective 1 January 2020, and would play out the 2019 season with the Crew.

Following the 2021 season and his loan with Hammarby, Accam's contract option was declined by Nashville and he became a free agent.

=== Return to Sweden ===
On 28 January 2021, Accam joined Swedish side Hammarby IF on a 12-month loan with an option to transfer. He made his competitive debut for the side on 1 April against Trelleborgs FF in the quarter-final of the Svenska Cupen, the main domestic cup. His side won 3–2 after extra time, with Accam coming on as a substitute and scoring in his debut. On 30 May 2021, Accam won the 2020–21 Svenska Cupen with Hammarby IF, through a 5–4 win on penalties (0–0 after full-time) against BK Häcken in the final, where he scored his attempt. At the end of the year, it was announced that Accam would leave the club at the expiration of his loan deal.

=== Finland ===
In August 2022, Accam signed with Finnish side Inter Turku on a four-month contract, with an option to extend it for an additional year.

== International career ==
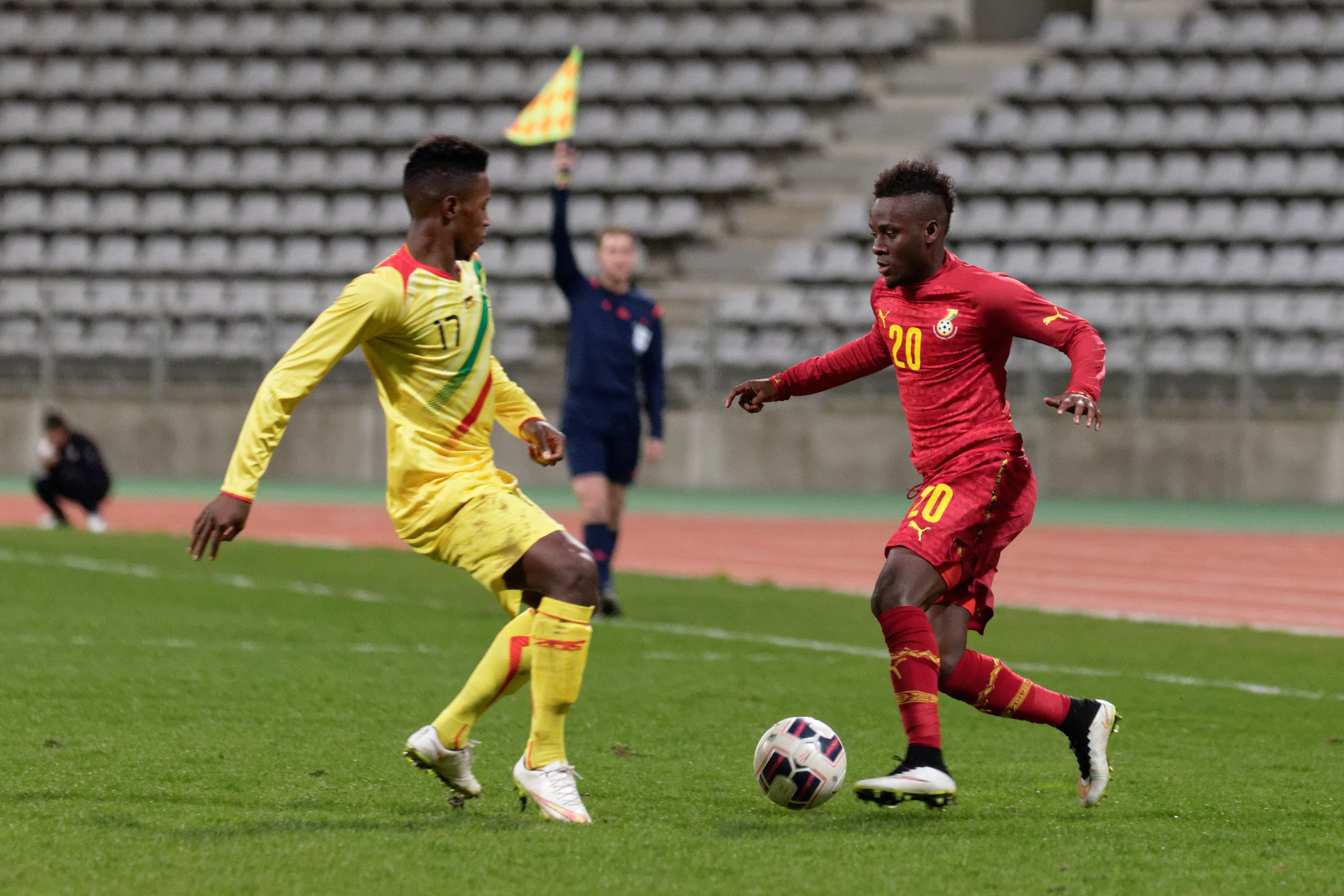
Accam playing for Ghana in 2015

Accam received his first call-up to the Ghana national team for a 2014 World Cup qualification match against Sudan on 24 March 2013, in which he was an unused substitute.

On 12 May 2014, Accam was named in a provisional 26-man squad in the 2014 World Cup by Ghana manager James Kwesi Appiah. However, on 2 June 2014, Accam was left out of the World Cup squad. Accam expressed his disappointment of being dropped for the World Cup squad.

On 15 November 2014, Accam made his international debut for Ghana in a 1–0 defeat to Uganda in a 2015 Africa Cup of Nations qualifier, coming on as a 67th-minute substitute for Christian Atsu.

He was selected as part of Ghana's preliminary squad for the 2015 Africa Cup of Nations.

== Personal life ==
Accam received his U.S. green card in October 2015 which qualifies him as a domestic player for MLS roster purposes.

Accam is a lifelong Arsenal fan and is a devout Christian. He married Ghanaian women's international footballer Florence Dadson on 3 January 2019 in Cape Coast, Ghana.

== Career statistics ==
=== Club ===
As of 24 October 2021

Appearances and goals by club, season and competition
Club	Season	League			National cup (Note: Includes the Svenska Cupen and U.S. Open Cup)		League cup		Continental		Other (Note: Appearance in the MLS Cup Playoffs)		Total	
Club	Season	Division	Apps	Goals	Apps	Goals	Apps	Goals	Apps	Goals	Apps	Goals	Apps	Goals
Ledbury Town	2009–10	WM(R)L Premier Division	8	5			–		–		–		8	5
Evesham United	2010–11	SFL Premier Division	20	10					–				20	10
Forest Green Rovers (dual reg.)	2010–11	Conference Premier	0	0	0	0	–		–		0	0	0	0
Östersunds FK	2012	Division 1	14	9	1	2	–		–		–		15	11
Helsingborg	2012	Allsvenskan	10	3	1	0	–		8 (Note: Two appearances in the UEFA Champions League, six appearances in the UEFA Europa League)	0	0	0	19	3
Helsingborg	2013	Allsvenskan	27	10	4	2	–		–		–		31	12
Helsingborg	2014	Allsvenskan	25	17	6	6	–		–		–		31	23
Helsingborg	Total		62	30	11	8	0	0	8	0	0	0	81	38
Chicago Fire	2015	MLS	24	10	2	0	–		–		–		26	10
Chicago Fire	2016	MLS	24	9	4	5	–		–		–		28	14
Chicago Fire	2017	MLS	30	14	0	0	–		–		1	0	31	14
Chicago Fire	Total		78	33	6	5	0	0	0	0	1	0	85	38
Philadelphia Union	2018	MLS	23	1	5	1	–		–		0	0	28	2
Philadelphia Union	2019	MLS	8	4	0	0	–		–		0	0	8	4
Philadelphia Union	Total		31	5	5	1	0	0	0	0	0	0	36	6
Columbus Crew SC	2019	MLS	15	2	2	2	–		–		–		17	4
Nashville SC	2020	MLS	7	1	–		–		–		–		7	1
Hammarby IF (loan)	2021	Allsvenskan	13	1	4	1	–		5 (Note: Appearances in UEFA Europa Conference League)	1	–		22	3
Inter Turku	2022	Veikkausliiga	10	0	2	2	0	0	0	0	–		12	2
Career total			258	96	31	21	0	0	13	1	1	0	303	118

=== International ===
As of 1 July 2017

Ghana
Year	Apps	Goals
2014	1	0
2015	5	1
2016	3	0
2017	2	0
Total	11	1

International goals
No.	Date	Venue	Opponent	Score	Result	Competition
1.	14 June 2015	Accra Sports Stadium, Accra, Ghana	Mauritius	7–1	7–1	2017 Africa Cup of Nations qualification

== Honours ==
Helsingborg

- Svenska Cupen runner-up: 2013–14

Philadelphia Union

- U.S. Open Cup runner-up: 2018

Hammarby IF

- Svenska Cupen: 2020–21

Inter Turku

- Suomen Cup runner-up: 2022

Ghana

- Africa Cup of Nations runner-up: 2015
