= Jonathan Mensah =

Ghanaian footballer (born 1990)

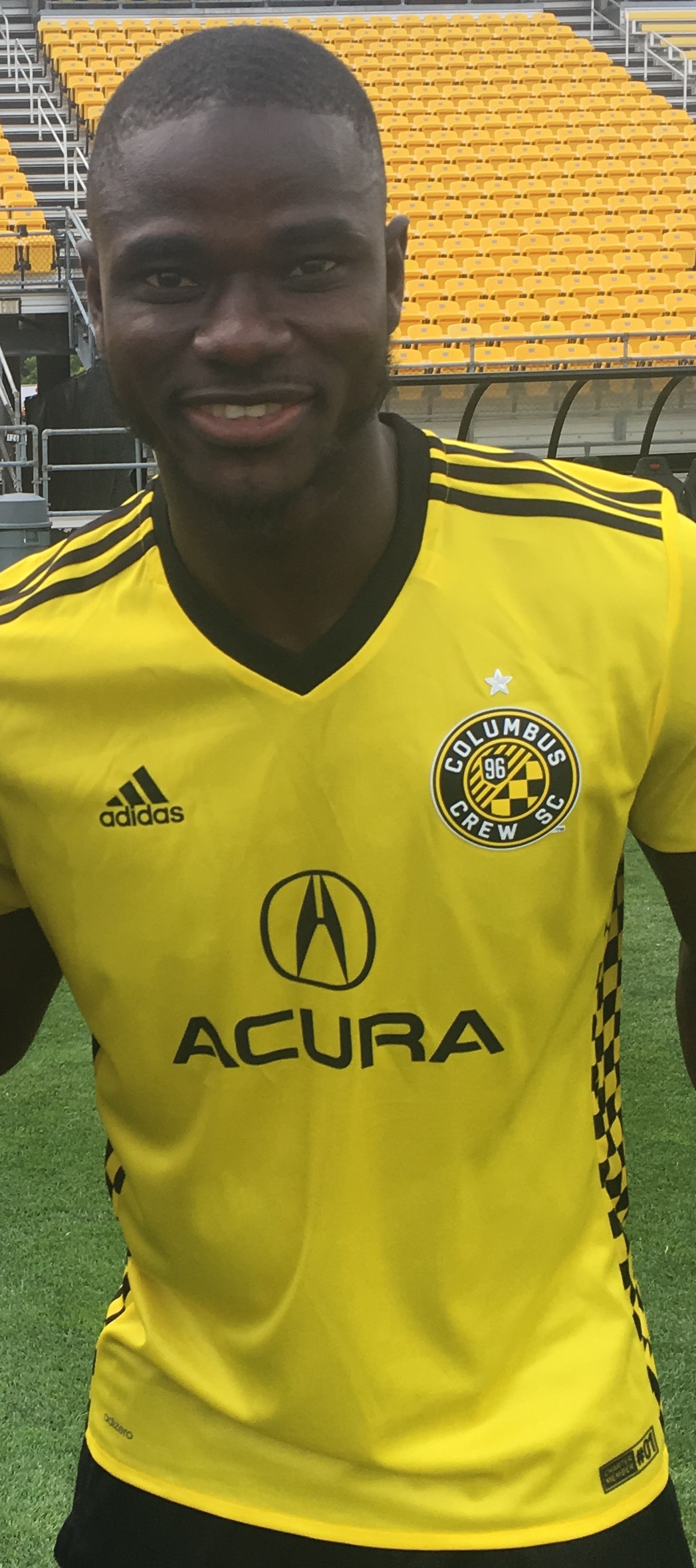
- Jonathan with Columbus Crew in 2017

Personal information
- Full name: Jonathan Mensah
- Date of birth: 13 July 1990 (age 36)
- Place of birth: Accra, Greater Accra, Ghana
- Height: 1.88 m (6 ft 2 in)
- Position: Defender

Youth career
- 2004–2006: Ashanti Gold

Senior career*
Years	Team	Apps	(Gls)
2007–2008	Ashanti Gold	29	(2)
2008–2009	Free State Stars	39	(2)
2010–2011	Udinese	0	(0)
2010–2011	→ Granada (loan)	15	(1)
2011–2016	Evian	49	(2)
2012–2015	Evian II	7	(0)
2016	Anzhi Makhachkala	15	(0)
2017–2022	Columbus Crew	159	(6)
2023	San Jose Earthquakes	25	(0)
2024	New England Revolution	8	(0)

International career^{‡}
2009	Ghana U20	12	(1)
2009–2022	Ghana	70	(1)
Medal record
Ghana
Winner	African Youth Championship	2009
Winner	FIFA U-20 World Cup	2009
Ghana
Runner-up	Africa Cup of Nations	2010
Runner-up	Africa Cup of Nations	2015
- * Club domestic league appearances and goals as of 23:46, 7 April 2024 (UTC) ‡ National team caps and goals as of 19:33, 10 December 2022 (UTC)

Jonathan Mensah (born 13 July 1990), commonly known simply as Jonathan, is a Ghanaian former professional footballer who played as a defender. He previously played for Ashanti Gold, Free State Stars, Granada, Evian, Anzhi Makhachkala, Columbus Crew, San Jose Earthquakes, and New England Revolution. Jonathan has represented the Ghana national team at two World Cups. To avoid confusion with the similarly named but unrelated John Mensah, he is typically known as and plays with the name "Jonathan" on his shirt.

Born in Accra, Jonathan began his professional career in his native Ghana with Ashanti Gold, but departed after one season to join Free State Stars in South Africa. After 40 appearances for his new club, he headed to Europe for the first time in his career, signing with Italian club Udinese. Jonathan never actually played for Udinese, instead spending eighteen months on loan at Granada and appearing 15 times for the Spanish team. He then moved again, joining newly promoted Ligue 1 club Evian ahead of the 2011–12 season. Jonathan found playing time to be fleeting in France, appearing in only 60 games in five seasons. After departing Evian in early 2016, he signed on with Anzhi Makhachkala in Russia, helping the club to avoid relegation in his first season. He left Anzhi after just 19 appearances and joined Columbus Crew SC in 2017, going on to win MLS Cup and MLS Best XI in 2020.

At international level, Jonathan helped Ghana to championships at the 2009 African Youth Championship and the 2009 FIFA U-20 World Cup. His play at the U20 World Cup earned him his first senior call-up ahead of the 2010 Africa Cup of Nations, where he helped the Black Stars finish as runners-up. Jonathan appeared for Ghana at the 2010 and 2014 World Cups, and was a part of the squads that reached the semifinals at five consecutive Africa Cup of Nations. He captained his nation for the first time in a World Cup qualifier against Congo on 5 September 2017.

== Club career ==
=== Ashanti Gold ===
After coming through the academy setup at Ashanti Gold, Jonathan was handed his professional debut for the club by head coach David Duncan during the 2007–08 Ghana Premier League season. At just 17 years of age, he played 29 times for 'AshGold' and scored two goals in his lone season with the senior team.

=== Free State Stars ===
Jonathan joined South African club Free State Stars in September 2008, moving to Ea Lla Koto alongside his 'AshGold' teammate David Telfer. He scored his inaugural goal for the club on 10 January 2009, as part of a 3–2 victory over AmaZulu, and went on to make 26 appearances on the year. At the end of the season, Jonathan received a trial with Greek club Panathinaikos; he was "reported to have done well," but could not sign for the team since they had exhausted their quota of foreign players. He turned down offers from other Greek clubs to go on trial, and instead returned to South Africa.

Although Jonathan missed most of the start of the 2009–10 season while with the Ghana U20s, he was reinstated to the starting lineup following his return to Free State Stars. His second goal for the club was scored on 4 November 2009, a ninetieth-minute match winner against AmaZulu. Jonathan appeared fourteen times before the winter break, but Ea Lla Koto struggled in those games, winning just three of those fourteen when he was in the squad.

Jonathan received interest from multiple European clubs ahead of the January 2010 transfer window, notably Serie A club Udinese and Bordeaux of Ligue 1. Both clubs submitted offers to Free State Stars, but it was Udinese who brought the player in for a medical in late December, ahead of the opening of the transfer window on 1 January.

=== Udinese ===
With the opening of the Italian transfer window, Jonathan officially became an Udinese player on 1 January 2010; he signed a three-year contract with the Serie A club. With the move, Jonathan united with his national teammate Kwadwo Asamoah, who entered his third season in Udine. However, before he had even arrived at Udinese, it was rumored that Jonathan was to be immediately loaned out, with Udinese's feeder club Granada the apparent destination.

Jonathan's first loan spell at Granada expired ahead of the 2010 FIFA World Cup, with rumours swirling that he would be sold ahead of the beginning of the tournament. In Italy, both Juventus and Lazio registered interest in the player, while reports from his native country suggested that Premier League clubs Aston Villa and Tottenham Hotspur would pursue a transfer. Following his performance in South Africa, interest also came from Olympique Lyonnais and Newcastle United. However, Udinese opted against a sale and instead sent Jonathan back on loan to Granada.

In June 2011, Jonathan returned from loan in Spain, saying "I think I will have to prove to the coach that I can [win a place] and remain in the team." However, he was later quoted by the Ghana Football Association as saying "Udinese have been very good to me and I am very happy to be at this club. Football can be a strange workplace, though, and you can move any time two clubs agree terms," as he was rumored to have transfer interest from France. He would agree a move to Evian in July, ending his eighteen-month spell with Udinese having never appeared for the club.

==== Loan to Granada ====
In January 2010, after joining Udinese, Jonathan moved on loan to Spanish club Granada. The initial loan to the Segunda División B side was for six months, in order to get him regular playing time; it was also necessary because Udinese already had hit their quota of foreign players, and were unable to register Jonathan in the squad. However, he did not feature in a match for Granada during that initial loan. Jonathan made the bench twice, but did not play as Granada won the Segunda División B and were promoted to the Segunda División for the first time since 1987–88.

Jonathan was sent back on loan to Granada for the 2010–11 Segunda División season, as Granada played their first second tier season in 22 years. After eight months with the club, he finally made his debut for El Graná on 29 August 2010 with a start against Real Betis in a season-opening 4–1 defeat. Jonathan scored his first, and only, goal for Granada on 21 November, although his 57th-minute strike came as part of a 3–2 defeat against Numancia. He also received his first professional red card that season, in the 48th minute of a 5–2 victory over Las Palmas on 26 February 2011. Jonathan made 15 appearances on the season, scoring once, as Granada won the promotion play-offs and were promoted to La Liga for the first time in 35 years.

=== Evian ===
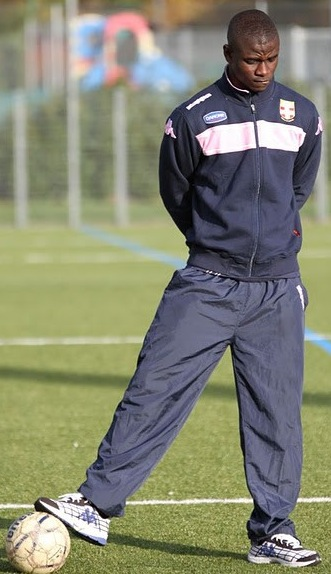
Jonathan was with Evian for all four top-flight seasons in the club's history

On 8 July 2011, Jonathan moved to newly promoted Ligue 1 side Evian, signing a four-year contract with the French club for an undisclosed fee. He made his club debut on 21 September, going the full ninety minutes in a 2–0 defeat away to Marseille. However, Jonathan did not play again on the season, as he aggravated a thigh injury while on international duty and remained on the sidelines until August 2012.

Jonathan began the 2012–13 season well, featuring six times in Evian's first 11 matches. However, his form and fitness declined, with injuries and international duty keeping him out of the team. Upon his return in February, he was demoted to the reserve side, playing six matches in the Championnat de France Amateur 2. He appeared 12 times overall, playing six games each for the first team and the reserves.

Jonathan returned to the first team in 2013, featuring in Evian's opening game of the 2013–14 Ligue 1 campaign and playing the full ninety minutes in a 1–1 draw with Sochaux on 10 August 2013. He scored his first goal for the club on 14 December, a 73rd-minute strike as Evian drew 1–1 with Stade de Reims, then four days later made his Coupe de la Ligue debut by appearing in a round of 16 tie against Bastia. Jonathan did miss time through injury and suspension: he was out for five weeks at the start of the season after suffering a thigh injury, and picked up a three-match ban after getting sent off 40 minutes into a defeat against Lyon in January. He returned to the team for the final seven matches of the season, helping Evian avoid relegation by four points. Jonathan appeared 27 times on the campaign, scoring once.

Following his performances at the 2014 FIFA World Cup, Jonathan was rated highly and rumored to be a transfer target for "several big European clubs," notably Monaco and Sampdoria. No moves came to fruition, however, and he returned to Evian for the 2014–15 season. Jonathan was a staple in the team at the start of the year, appearing ten times for Les Croix de Savoyes through the end of October. During that stretch, he scored his second goal for the club in a 2–1 victory over Lens; he also received his second red card in a 2–1 defeat to Lorient in the Coupe de la Ligue. Jonathan promptly fell out of the Evian squad following that sending off, first suffering from a hamstring injury and then getting called up by Ghana for the 2015 Africa Cup of Nations. He played just twice more on the campaign, before suffering an injury while on international duty in March and then receiving a four-month ban from FIFA in May that ended his season. Jonathan appeared in twelve games for Evian, scoring once as the club were relegated to the second tier.

==== Breach of contract case ====
On 19 May 2015, Jonathan was banned for four months by FIFA in a breach of contract case. The case stemmed from his transfer to Evian in July 2011, as FIFA judged that Jonathan had still been under contract with Udinese but claimed to be a free agent when he signed with the French club. Udinese had originally reported him just weeks after the transfer, claiming that he had four years remaining on his contract; Jonathan, however, responded by saying "My manager cannot make such a mistake. I have no contract with Udinese." FIFA originally completed their investigation and levied the ban in July 2014; however, Jonathan appealed to the Court of Arbitration for Sport, who eventually upheld the ban. Following the CAS ruling, FIFA confirmed that the ban began retroactively on 30 April 2015, and "begins again at the start of the next season, whichever country he may choose to play in." It was also confirmed that the ban only applied to club football, with Jonathan still eligible to play for Ghana over the summer.

Even following the ban, Jonathan was "hopeful" that he would move to a new club over the summer window; he told reporters in his native Ghana that he did not "think this situation will hamper any move because like I said, teams know what I can do." Four-time defending Scottish champions Celtic had shown interest in the player, but promptly ended their pursuit following the announcement from FIFA confirming the ban. Jonathan instead re-signed with Evian on a new deal after his initial four-year contract had expired.

Jonathan missed the first three months of the 2015–16 season while serving the duration of his ban, officially returning to the active squad for Evian on 26 October. He made his Ligue 2 debut on 6 November, playing the full ninety minutes in a 4–0 victory over Valenciennes. However, Jonathan almost immediately was ruled out through injury, missing the entire month of December after suffering a knock while on international duty. He would play just six more times for Evian while being the subject of much transfer speculation, with Premier League club Swansea City reported to be interested on bringing him in on a free transfer at the end of the season. Jonathan did not wait until the summer, however, departing Evian before the end of February. He finished the 2015–16 campaign having appeared in eight matches, seven of those with the senior team, and finished his five seasons in France with two goals from 60 appearances.

=== Anzhi Makhachkala ===
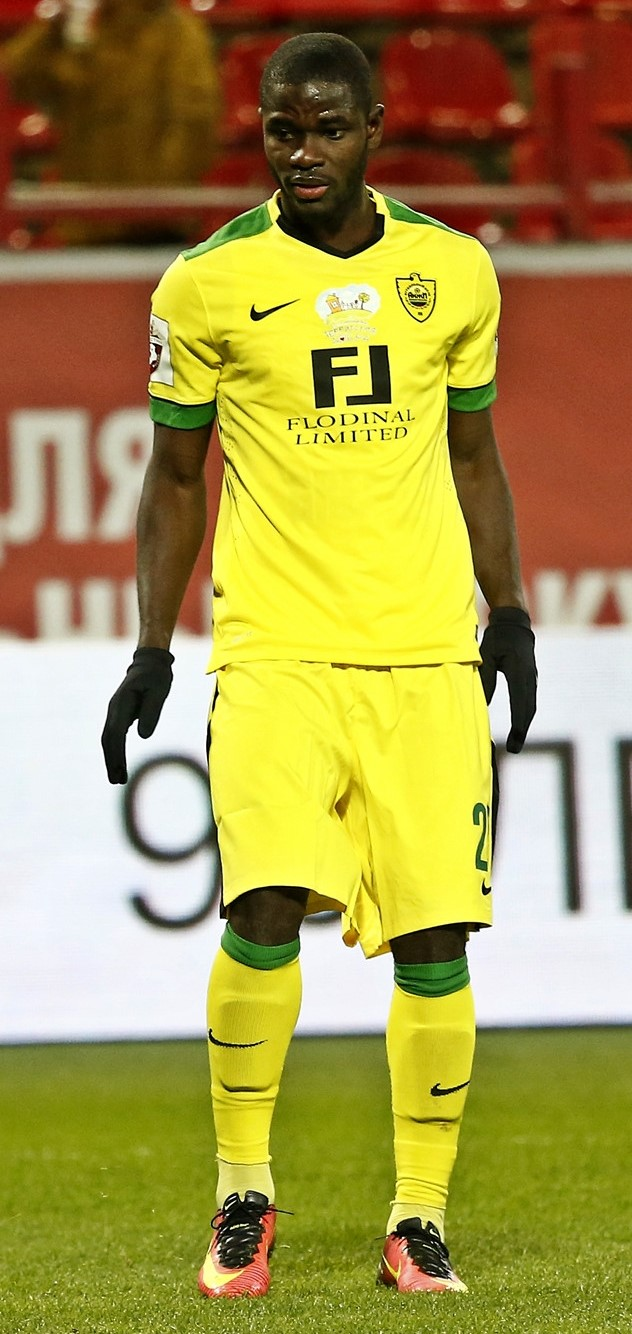
Jonathan is one of three Ghanaian players to have appeared for Anzhi, alongside Emmanuel Osei Kuffour and Kwadwo Poku

On 23 February 2016, Jonathan signed a two-and-a-half-year contract with Russian Premier League club Anzhi Makhachkala; according to reports, the transfer fee for the defender was just €150,000, with a 20% sell-on clause tacked on as part of the agreement. He made his debut for Anzhi in the first game following the winter break, playing the full ninety minutes in a 1–0 defeat against Amkar Perm. Jonathan missed much of the spring while on international duty, and returned to the club at the end of April with Anzhi sitting bottom of the table in the RPL. He started each of the last three games of the season, from which Anzhi claimed seven points, helping the club advance to 13th and into a relegation playoff against Volgar Astrakhan of the Russian Football National League. There, Jonathan played all 180 minutes as Anzhi escaped relegation by a 3–0 aggregate score. He finished the season having appeared eight times.

Jonathan struggled to find consistent game time during the front half of the 2016–17 season, appearing in just nine of seventeen league matches. He did, however, make his debut in the Russian Cup with a start against Mordovia Saransk in the round of 32. Midway through the winter break, Jonathan was rumored to be departing Anzhi permanently, with American club Columbus Crew SC the reported destination. That move would come to fruition three days into 2017; Jonathan departed Anzhi after appearing just nineteen times for the Eagles.

=== Columbus Crew ===
On 3 January 2017, it was announced that Major League Soccer club Columbus Crew had signed Jonathan as the fifth Designated Player in club history. He became the second DP on the Columbus roster at the time, alongside Federico Higuaín. Prior to the season, Jonathan was named as part of the leadership council for the Crew, alongside Federico Higuaín, Ethan Finlay, Justin Meram, and Josh Williams. The five collectively served as vice-captains behind captain Wil Trapp. Jonathan made his club debut on 4 March, playing the full ninety minutes in a season-opening 1–1 draw with Chicago Fire. He scored his first goal for the Crew on 26 August, providing the winner in a 2–1 victory over FC Dallas, then notched his second for the club nearly a month later, part of a 3–2 victory over New York Red Bulls on 23 September. However, Jonathan's form during the season was strongly criticized, with even the player admitting that the season "wasn't great". He received two red cards, against Houston in March and Philadelphia in July, saw eleven total cards on the season, and committed multiple errors that were alleged to have led to goals. Despite these criticisms, he would remain an integral part of the Crew's lineup, eventually starting all five playoff matches as Columbus were eliminated in the conference finals. Jonathan made 31 appearances in his first season in MLS, tallying two goals.

Jonathan remained on the leadership council ahead of the 2018 season, this time joined by Ricardo Clark, Higuaín, Hector Jiménez, Zack Steffen, and Williams. He would see his contract bought down by the club in late January, meaning that Jonathan would no longer be considered a Designated Player and clearing the way for Milton Valenzuela to be acquired by Columbus.

Prior to the 2020 season opener, Jonathan was named captain in his fourth season with the club, succeeding Trapp. Mensah played every single minute of every single match during the 2020 season; en route to an MLS Cup victory over Seattle Sounders FC. He led the club to their first trophy in twelve years, whilst also becoming the first African to captain his side to an MLS Cup.

During the 2021 Columbus Crew season, Jonathan scored 4 total goals across all competitions; including the game winner versus Atlanta United FC on 24 July.

=== San Jose Earthquakes ===
On 10 February 2023, the San Jose Earthquakes announced they had acquired Jonathan from the Columbus Crew for a fee of $200,000, possibly rising to $500,000, depending on his longevity with the Quakes.

=== New England Revolution ===
On 4 January 2024, Mensah reunited with former head coach Caleb Porter at New England Revolution, who he joined as a free agent after leaving San Jose at the end of their 2023 season. New England declined Jonathan's contract option following their 2024 season.

== International career ==
Jonathan made his debut in the Ghanaian international setup at the 2009 African Youth Championship, where he earned his first three youth international caps and helped the Ghana U20s claim their third-ever continental title. In the final, he had a goal-line clearance in the 58th minute to help preserve a 2–0 victory over Cameroon. Jonathan was then called up for the 2009 FIFA U-20 World Cup, first being named to the provisional squad and then selected as part of the final roster. He appeared in six of the Black Satellites' seven matches at the tournament, marshaling the defense as Ghana went all the way to the final. There, against four-time champions Brazil, Ghana claimed their first U20 World Cup with a 4–3 penalty shoot-out victory after 120 scoreless minutes. Jonathan had his kick in the shoot-out saved by Rafael, but was bailed out when Daniel Agyei saved each of the next three Brazilian kicks. He finished his eligibility at U20 level having appeared nine times.

=== Early career and 2010 tournaments ===
Thanks to his youth performances, Jonathan was called up for the first time to the Ghana senior team; he made his debut for the Black Stars against Uganda on 31 May 2009. He was included in the squad for the 2010 Africa Cup of Nations, although he did not make an appearance as Ghana went to the final before being defeated by Egypt. Jonathan did enough, however, to earn a call-up to the 2010 FIFA World Cup, where he was given the number 8 shirt usually worn by Michael Essien. With first-choice centre back Isaac Vorsah out injured, Jonathan established himself as a central defensive partner for John Mensah. He would go on to play two out of three group stage games, as well as the round of 16 win against the United States.

=== Buildup to and the 2014 World Cup ===
Jonathan established himself as a starter following the World Cup, including scoring his first goal for Ghana in a friendly against Togo on 8 February 2011. He was named to the squad to appear at the 2012 Africa Cup of Nations, the final edition of the tournament in even-numbered years before being moved to avoid conflicts with the World Cup. Jonathan played twice during the group stage, but lost his place in the lineup during the knockout stage to John Boye before returning for the third place match, a 2–0 defeat to Mali. He was again named in the squad a year later, called up for the 2013 Africa Cup of Nations alongside his club teammate Mohammed Rabiu. However, Jonathan played just once during the tournament, as a halftime substitute in the third place play-off to replace Boye.

On 12 May 2014, Jonathan was named in Ghana's 30-man preliminary squad for the 2014 FIFA World Cup; he was then named to the final squad on 2 June. He started every match at the tournament for the Black Stars, although they failed to advance out of the group with a record of one draw and two defeats.

=== AFCON success and World Cup qualifying failure ===
After appearing six times during qualifying, Jonathan played every minute of Ghana's 2015 Africa Cup of Nations campaign, helping them reach the final. There, the Black Stars lost in a penalty shootout against Ivory Coast, although Jonathan made his penalty as the sixth taker for Ghana. Two years later, at the 2017 Africa Cup of Nations, Jonathan was initially named to the preliminary squad on 2 January; one day later, he left camp to complete a transfer move to Columbus Crew. He was still named to the final squad on 4 January, but played just twice in Gabon. One of those appearances came in the third place play-off, as Ghana were defeated on a goal from Alain Traoré of Burkina Faso.

Ghana had appeared in three consecutive World Cups before failing to qualify for the 2018 FIFA World Cup. Jonathan appeared five times during the qualification cycle for the Black Stars, including both games in the second round against the Comoros. Although Ghana finished third in their group in the third round, and therefore failed to qualify for Russia 2018, Jonathan wore the captain's armband for the Black Stars for the first time: against Congo on 5 September 2017, with Ghana claiming a 5–1 victory that was their only win in the third round.

== Personal life ==
Jonathan is known to be a devout Christian who reads Psalms before every game. He is friends with fellow Christian footballers Christian Atsu and Odion Ighalo.

In July 2013, Jonathan launched his eponymous charity foundation, the Jonathan Mensah Foundation. It was "aimed at providing logistical support, donations and funding to under-privileged institutions and orphanages across the country." The foundation has donated to and helped to clean up the Royal Seed Home and Dzorwulu Special School, among other endeavors. For the 2017 season, Jonathan was named as the Columbus Crew Humanitarian of the Year, both for his work through his charity and his volunteer efforts in the Columbus community.

== Career statistics ==
=== Club ===
As of match played 20 July 2024

Appearances and goals by club, season and competition
Club	Season	League			National Cup (Note: Includes the Nedbank Cup, Coupe de France, Russian Cup and U.S. Open Cup)		League Cup (Note: All appearances in the Coupe de la Ligue and MLS is Back)		Continental (Note: Appearances in the CONCACAF Champions League and the Campeones Cup)		Other (Note: All appearances in the Russian Premier League Relegation Playoffs and MLS Cup Playoffs)		Total	
Club	Season	Division	Apps	Goals	Apps	Goals	Apps	Goals	Apps	Goals	Apps	Goals	Apps	Goals
AshantiGold	2007–08	Ghana Premier League	29	2	0	0	—		0	0	—		29	2
Free State Stars	2008–09	Premier Soccer League	26	1	1	0	—		—		—		26	1
Free State Stars	2009–10	Premier Soccer League	13	1	1	0	—		—		—		14	1
Free State Stars	Total		39	2	2	0	—		—		—		40	2
Granada (loan)	2009–10	Segunda División B	0	0	0	0	—		—		0	0	0	0
Granada (loan)	2010–11	Segunda División	15	1	0	0	—		—		0	0	15	1
Granada (loan)	Total		15	1	0	0	—		—		0	0	15	1
Evian	2011–12	Ligue 1	1	0	0	0	0	0	—		—		1	0
Evian	2012–13	Ligue 1	6	0	0	0	0	0	—		—		6	0
Evian	2013–14	Ligue 1	26	1	0	0	1	0	—		—		27	1
Evian	2014–15	Ligue 1	11	1	0	0	1	0	—		—		12	1
Evian	2015–16	Ligue 2	5	0	2	0	0	0	—		—		7	0
Evian	Total		49	2	2	0	2	0	—		—		53	2
Evian II	2012–13	National 3	6	0	—		—		—		—		6	0
Evian II	2015–16	National 3	1	0	—		—		—		—		1	0
Evian II	Total		7	0	—		—		—		—		7	0
Anzhi Makhachkala	2015–16	Russian Premier League	6	0	0	0	—		—		2	0	8	0
Anzhi Makhachkala	2016–17	Russian Premier League	9	0	2	0	—		—		—		11	0
Anzhi Makhachkala	Total		15	0	2	0	—		—		2	0	19	0
Columbus Crew	2017	MLS	26	2	0	0	—		—		5	0	31	2
Columbus Crew	2018	MLS	27	1	0	0	—		—		3	0	30	1
Columbus Crew	2019	MLS	24	0	0	0	—		—		—		24	0
Columbus Crew	2020	MLS	23	0	0	0	1	0	—		4	0	28	0
Columbus Crew	2021	MLS	29	2	0	0	—		3	2	—		32	4
Columbus Crew	2022	MLS	30	2	0	0	—		—		—		30	2
Columbus Crew	Total		159	7	0	0	1	0	3	2	13	1	175	9
San Jose Earthquakes	2023	MLS	26	0	—		—		—		1	0	27	0
New England Revolution	2024	MLS	8	0	—		—		3	0	0	0	11	0
Career total			347	14	6	0	3	0	6	2	16	1	376	16

=== International ===
As of 9 October 2022

Ghana
Year	Apps	Goals
2009	1	0
2010	9	0
2011	6	1
2012	4	0
2013	7	0
2014	11	0
2015	11	0
2016	6	0
2017	5	0
2018	1	0
2019	4	0
2021	3	0
2022	1	0
Total	69	1

International goals
No.	Date	Venue	Opponent	Score	Result	Competition
1	8 February 2011	Bosuilstadion, Antwerp, Belgium	Togo	2–1	4–1	Friendly

== Honours ==
Granada

- Segunda División B: 2009–10
- La Liga play-offs: 2011

Columbus Crew

- MLS Cup: 2020
- Campeones Cup: 2021

Ghana U20

- FIFA U-20 World Cup: 2009
- African Youth Championship: 2009

Individual

- Columbus Crew SC Humanitarian of the Year: 2017
- Columbus Crew SC Defender of the Year: 2018, 2019, 2020
- MLS Best XI: 2020
