= Ghana national football team results (2010–2019) =

This is a list of the Ghana national football team results from 2010 to 2019.

== 2010 ==
5 January 2010 International Friendly	Ghana	0–0	Malawi	Manzini, Swaziland
19:30 UTC+2		(Report)		Stadium: Mavuso Sports Centre; Attendance: 2,000; Referee: Mbongseni Fakudze (Swaziland)

15 January 2010 2010 Africa Cup of Nations	Ivory Coast	3–1	Ghana	Cabinda, Angola
19:30 UTC+2	Gervinho 23'; Tiéné 66'; Drogba 90'	(Report)	Gyan 90+3' (pen.)	Stadium: Estádio Chimandela; Attendance: 23,000; Referee: Jerome Damon (South Africa)

19 January 2010 2010 Africa Cup of Nations	Burkina Faso	0–1	Ghana	Luanda, Angola
17:00 UTC+2		(Report)	A. Ayew 30'	Stadium: Estádio 11 de Novembro; Attendance: 8,000; Referee: Eddy Maillet (Seychelles)

24 January 2010 2010 Africa Cup of Nations	Angola	0–1	Ghana	Luanda, Angola
17:00 UTC+2		(Report)	Gyan 15'	Stadium: Estádio 11 de Novembro; Attendance: 50,000; Referee: Mohamed Benouza (Algeria)

28 January 2010 2010 Africa Cup of Nations	Ghana	1–0	Nigeria	Luanda, Angola
16:00 UTC+2	Gyan 21'	(Report)		Stadium: Estádio 11 de Novembro; Attendance: 7,500; Referee: Daniel Bennett (South Africa)

31 January 2010 2010 Africa Cup of Nations	Ghana	0–1	Egypt	Luanda, Angola
17:00 UTC+2		(Report)	Geddo 85'	Stadium: Estádio 11 de Novembro; Attendance: 50,000; Referee: Koman Coulibaly (Mali)

3 March 2010 International Friendly	Bosnia and Herzegovina	2–1	Ghana	Sarajevo, Bosnia and Herzegovina
12:30 UTC+1	Ibišević 40'; Pjanić 65'	(Report)	Muntari 85'	Stadium: Asim Ferhatović Hase Stadium; Attendance: 10,000; Referee: Damir Batinić (Croatia)

27 May 2010 International Friendly	Ghana	2–0	Slovenia	Paris, France
UTC+2	Gyan 21'; Muntari 85'

1 June 2010 International Friendly	Netherlands	4–1	Ghana	Rotterdam, Netherlands
14:00 UTC+2	Kuyt 30'; Van der Vaart 71'; Sneijder 81'; Van Persie 87'		Gyan 76'	Stadium: Feijenoord Stadion; Attendance: 50,000

5 June 2010 International Friendly	Ghana	1–0	Latvia	Milton Keynes, England
UTC+1	Owusu-Abeyie 89'			Stadium: stadium:mk

13 June 2010 2010 FIFA World Cup	Serbia	0–1	Ghana	Pretoria, South Africa
16:00 UTC+2		(Report)	Gyan 85' (pen.)	Stadium: Loftus Versfeld Stadium; Attendance: 38,833; Referee: Héctor Baldassi (Argentina)

19 June 2010 2010 FIFA World Cup	Ghana	1–1	Australia	Rustenburg, South Africa
16:00 UTC+2	Gyan 25' (pen.)	Report	Holman 11'	Stadium: Royal Bafokeng Stadium; Attendance: 34,812; Referee: Roberto Rosetti (Italy)

23 June 2010 2010 FIFA World Cup	Ghana	0–1	Germany	Johannesburg, South Africa
20:30 UTC+2		Report	Özil 60'	Stadium: Soccer City Stadium; Attendance: 83,391; Referee: Carlos Eugênio Simon (Brazil)

26 June 2010 2010 FIFA World Cup	United States	1–2 (a.e.t.)	Ghana	Rustenburg, South Africa
20:30 UTC+2	Donovan 62' (pen.)	Report	Boateng 5'; Gyan 93'	Stadium: Royal Bafokeng Stadium; Attendance: 34,976; Referee: Viktor Kassai (Hungary)

2 July 2010 2010 FIFA World Cup	Uruguay	1 – 1 (a.e.t.); 4 – 2 (p.s.o.)	Ghana	Johannesburg, South Africa
20:30 UTC+2	Forlán 55'	Report	Muntari 45+2'	Stadium: Soccer City Stadium; Attendance: 84,017; Referee: Olegario Benquerenca (Portugal)

11 August 2010 International Friendly	South Africa	1 – 0	Ghana	FNB Stadium, Johannesburg
UTC+2	Mphela 42'	Report		Attendance: 40,000

3 September 2010 2012 CAF Qualifying	Swaziland	0 – 3	Ghana	Lobamba, Swaziland
18:00 UTC+2				Stadium: Somhlolo National Stadium

10 October 2010 2012 CAF Qualifying	Ghana	0 – 0	Sudan	Kumasi, Ghana
18:00 UTC+0				Stadium: Baba Yara Stadium; Attendance: 39,000

== 2011 ==
8 February 2011 International Friendly	Ghana	4 – 1	Togo	Antwerp, Belgium
20:00 GMT	Adiyiah 10'; Jonathan Mensah 60'; Akakpo 69' (o.g.); Inkoom 84'		Amewou 48' (pen.)	Stadium: Bosuilstadion; Referee: Vervecken

27 March 2011 2012 CAF Qualifying	Congo	0 – 3	Ghana	Brazzaville, Congo
15:30 UTC+1			Tagoe 5'; Adiyiah 26'; Muntari 68'	Stadium: Stade de la Revolution

29 March 2011 International Friendly	England	1 – 1	Ghana	London, England
20:00 UTC+1	Carroll 43'		Gyan 90+1'	Stadium: Wembley Stadium

3 June 2011 2012 CAF Qualifying	Ghana	3 – 1	Congo	Kumasi, Ghana
20:00 UTC±0	Vorsah 62'; Tagoe 66'; Emmanuel Agyemang Badu 72'		N'Guessi	Stadium: Baba Yara Stadium

7 June 2011 International Friendly	South Korea	2 – 1	Ghana	Jeonju, South Korea
20:00 UTC+9	Ji Dong-Won 10'; Koo Ja-Cheol 90'		Gyan 63'	Stadium: Jeonju World Cup Stadium; Attendance: 41,271; Referee: Ravshan Irmatov (Uzbekistan)

2 September 2011 2012 CAF Qualifying	Ghana	2 – 0	Swaziland	Accra, Ghana
UTC+0	Gyan 9'; Agyemang-Badu 80'			Stadium: Accra Sports Stadium

5 September 2011 International Friendly	Ghana	0 – 1	Brazil	Fulham, England
18:45 UTC+0			Leandro Damião 45'	Stadium: Craven Cottage; Referee: Mike Dean (England)

7 October 2011 2012 CAF Qualifying	Sudan	0 – 2	Ghana	Khartoum, Sudan
16:00 UTC+3		Report	Gyan 10'; Mensah 20'	Stadium: Al-Hilal Stadium

11 October 2011 International Friendly	Ghana	0 – 0	Nigeria	Watford, England
				Stadium: Vicarage Road

15 November 2011 International Friendly	Ghana	2 – 1	Gabon	Saint-Leu-la-Forêt, France
20:00 UTC+1	Agyeman-Badu 12' (pen.); Asamoah 90+2'		Mouloungui

== 2012 ==
15 January 2012 International Friendly	Ghana	1 – 1	South Africa	Rustenburg, South Africa
15:00 UTC+2	Muntari 11'	Report	T. Sangweni 06'	Stadium: Royal Bafokeng Stadium

24 January 2012 2012 Africa Cup of Nations Group D	Ghana	1 – 0	Botswana	Franceville, Gabon
17:00 UTC+1	John Mensah 25'	Report		Stadium: Stade de Franceville; Referee: Badara Diatta (Senegal)

28 January 2012 2012 Africa Cup of Nations Group D	Ghana	2 – 0	Mali	Franceville, Gabon
20:00 UTC+1	Gyan 63'; A. Ayew 76'	Report		Stadium: Stade de Franceville; Referee: Djamel Haimoudi (Algeria)

1 February 2012 2012 Africa Cup of Nations Group D	Ghana	1 – 1	Guinea	Franceville, Gabon
19:00 UTC+1	Agyemang-Badu 28'	Report	A. R. Camara 45+2'	Stadium: Stade de Franceville; Referee: Daniel Bennett (South Africa)

5 February 2012 2012 Africa Cup of Nations Quarter-final	Ghana	2 – 1	Tunisia	Franceville, Gabon
20:00 UTC+1	John Mensah 10'; A. Ayew 101'	Report	Khelifa 42'	Stadium: Stade de Franceville; Referee: Neant Alioum (Cameroon)

8 February 2012 2012 Africa Cup of Nations Semi-final	Zambia	1 – 0	Ghana	Bata, Equatorial Guinea
17:00 UTC+1	Mayuka 78'	Report		Stadium: Estadio de Bata; Referee: Mohamed Benouza (Algeria)

11 February 2012 2012 Africa Cup of Nations 3rd place play-off	Mali	2 – 0	Ghana	Malabo, Equatorial Guinea
20:00 UTC+1	Diabaté 23', 80'	Report		Stadium: Estadio de Malabo; Referee: Gehad Grisha (Egypt)

29 February 2012 International Friendly	Ghana	1 – 1	Chile	Chester, Pennsylvania, U.S.
19:00 UTC−5	Mpong 42'	Report	Matías Fernández 75' (pen.)	Stadium: PPL Park

1 June 2012 2014 FIFA World Cup qualification	Ghana	7 – 0	Lesotho	Kumasi, Ashanti, Ghana
01:00 UTC+1	Muntari 15'; Adiyiah 24', 50'; J. Ayew 45', 88'; Atsu 85'; Akaminko 90+2'	Report		Stadium: Kumasi Sports Stadium; Referee: Badara Diatta (Senegal)

9 June 2012 2014 FIFA World Cup qualification	Zambia	1 – 0	Ghana	Ndola, Copperbelt, Zambia
14:00 UTC+1	Katongo 18'	Report		Stadium: Levy Mwanawasa Stadium; Referee: Med Said Kordi (Tunisia)

15 August 2012 International Friendly	Ghana	1 – 1	China	Guangzhou, Tianhe, China
12:35 UTC±0	Boakye 80'	Report	Gao Lin 57' (pen.)	Stadium: Tianhe Stadium; Referee: Kang Hee Choi (South Korea)

8 September 2012 2013 Africa Cup of Nations qualification	Ghana	2 – 0	Malawi	Accra, Ghana
15:30 UTC±0	Atsu 8'; Annan 53'	Report		Stadium: Ohene Djan Stadium; Referee: Mohamed Benouza (Algeria)

13 October 2012 2013 Africa Cup of Nations qualification	Malawi	0 – 1	Ghana	Lilongwe, Central, Malawi
14:30 UTC+2		Report	Acquah 4'	Stadium: Civo Stadium; Referee: Khalid Abdelrahman (Sudan)

14 November 2012 International Friendly	Cape Verde	0 – 1	Ghana	Lisboa, Portugal
14:00 UTC+0		Report	Wakasso 4'	Stadium: Estádio Universitário de Lisboa

== 2013 ==
10 January 2013 International Friendly	Ghana	3 – 0	Egypt	Abu Dhabi, U.A.E
17:00 UTC+0	Badu 18'; Boakye 54'; Gyan 83'	Report		Stadium: Sheikh Zayed Stadium; Referee: Mohammed Abdulla Hassan Mohammed (United Arab Emirates)

13 January 2013 International Friendly	Ghana	4 – 2	Tunisia	Abu Dhabi, U.A.E
16:10 UTC+0	Boye 58'; Wakaso 64' (pen.); Gyan 73'; Adomah 86'	Report	Jemâa 16', 47'	Stadium: Sheikh Zayed Stadium

20 January 2013 2013 Africa Cup of Nations Group B	Ghana	2 – 2	DR Congo	Port Elizabeth, South Africa
17:00 UTC+2	Badu 40'; Asamoah 50'	Report	Mputu 53'; Mbokani 68' (pen.)	Stadium: Nelson Mandela Bay Stadium; Referee: Daniel Bennett (South Africa)

24 January 2013 2013 Africa Cup of Nations Group B	Ghana	1 – 0	Mali	Port Elizabeth, South Africa
17:00 UTC+2	Wakaso 38' (pen.)	Report		Stadium: Nelson Mandela Bay Stadium; Referee: Noumandiez Doué (Ivory Coast)

28 January 2013 2013 Africa Cup of Nations Group B	Ghana	3 – 0	Niger	Port Elizabeth, South Africa
19:00 UTC+2	Gyan 6'; Atsu 23'; Boye 49'	Report		Stadium: Nelson Mandela Bay Stadium; Referee: Badara Diatta (Senegal)

2 February 2013 2013 Africa Cup of Nations Quarter-final	Ghana	2 – 0	Cape Verde	Port Elizabeth, South Africa
17:00 UTC+2	Wakaso 54' (pen.), 90+5'	Report		Stadium: Nelson Mandela Bay Stadium; Referee: Rajindraparsad Seechurn (Mauritius)

6 February 2013 2013 Africa Cup of Nations Semi-final	Ghana	1 – 1 (a.e.t.) (2 – 3 p)	Burkina Faso	Nelspruit, South Africa
20:30 UTC+2	Wakaso 13' (pen.)	Report	Bancé 60'	Stadium: Mbombela Stadium; Referee: Selim Jedidi (Tunisia)
	Penalties
	(penalty missed) Vorsah; (penalty scored) Atsu; (penalty scored) Afful; (penalty missed) Clottey; (penalty missed) Agyemang-Badu		B. Koné (penalty scored); H. Traoré (penalty scored); Paul Koulibaly (penalty missed); Bancé (penalty scored)

9 February 2013 2013 Africa Cup of Nations 3rd place play-off	Ghana	1 – 3	Mali	Port Elizabeth, South Africa
20:00 UTC+2	Asamoah 82'	Report	Mah. Samassa 21'; Keita 48'; S. Diarra 90+4'	Stadium: Nelson Mandela Bay Stadium; Referee: Eric Otogo-Castane (Gabon)

24 March 2013 2014 FIFA World Cup qualification	Ghana	4 – 0	Sudan	Kumasi, Ashanti
16:00 UTC+0	Gyan 19'; Wakaso 38'; Waris 79'; Badu 84'	Report		Stadium: Kumasi Sports Stadium; Referee: Anthony Ramsy Raphael (Malawi)

7 June 2013 2014 FIFA World Cup qualification	Ghana	3 – 1	Sudan	Omdurman, Sudan
20:00 UTC+3	Gyan 16', 63'; Muntari 83'	Report	El Tahir 30' (pen.)	Stadium: Al-Merrikh Stadium; Referee: Ousmane Fall (Senegal)

16 June 2013 2014 FIFA World Cup qualification	Ghana	2 – 0	Lesotho	Maseru, Lesotho
15:00 UTC+2	Atsu 44'; Gyan 75'	Report		Stadium: Setsoto Stadium; Referee: Thierry Nkurunziza (Burundi)

14 August 2013 International Friendly	Ghana	2 – 2	Turkey	Istanbul, Turkey
18:00 UTC+0	Gyan 61', 75'	Report	Yılmaz 7'; Bulut 28'	Stadium: Atatürk Olympic Stadium; Referee: Matej Jug (Slovenia)

6 September 2013 2014 FIFA World Cup qualification	Ghana	2 – 1	Zambia	Kumasi, Ashanti
16:00 UTC±0	Waris 17'; Asamoah 62'	Report	Sinkala 72'	Stadium: Kumasi Sports Stadium; Referee: Djamel Haimoudi (Algeria)

10 September 2013 International Friendly (2013 Kirin Challenge Cup)	Ghana	1 – 3	Japan	Kanagawa, Japan
11:20 UTC+0	Acheampong 24'	Report	Kagawa 50'; Endō 64'; Honda 72'	Stadium: International Stadium Yokohama; Attendance: 64,525; Referee: Chris Beath (Australia)

15 October 2013 2014 FIFA World Cup qualification – Final	Ghana	6 – 1	Egypt	Kumasi, Ashanti
16:00 UTC+0	Asamoah Gyan 5', 54'; Wael Gomaa 22' (o.g.); Abdul Majeed Waris 44'; Sulley Muntari 73' (pen.); Christian Atsu 88'	Report	Mohamed Aboutrika 41' (pen.)	Stadium: Kumasi Sports Stadium; Referee: Bouchaïb El Ahrach (Morocco)

19 November 2013 2014 FIFA World Cup qualification – Final	Ghana	1 – 2; 2nd leg: 7 – 3 (Aggregate)	Egypt	Cairo, Egypt
18:00 UTC+2	Kevin-Prince Boateng 89'	Report	Amr Zaki 25'; Mohamed Nagy Gedo 84'	Stadium: 30 June Stadium; Referee: Noumandiez Doué (Ivory Coast)

== 2014 ==
4 January 2014 International Friendly	Namibia	0–1	Ghana	Windhoek, Namibia
17:00 UTC+2		Report	S. Mohammed 28'	Stadium: Independence Stadium

13 January 2014 2014 African Nations Championship – Group C	Ghana	1–0	Congo	Bloemfontein, South Africa
17:00 UTC+2	Annorbaah 34'	Report		Stadium: Free State Stadium; Attendance: 3,500; Referee: Sylvester Kirwa (Kenya)

17 January 2014 2014 African Nations Championship – Group C	Ghana	1–1	Libya	Bloemfontein, South Africa
17:00 UTC+2	Yahaya 6'	Report	Al Badri 73' (pen.)	Stadium: Free State Stadium; Attendance: 7,000; Referee: Redouane Jiyed (Morocco); Victor Gomes (South Africa)

21 January 2014 2014 African Nations Championship – Group C	Ethiopia	0–1	Ghana	Bloemfontein, South Africa
19:00 UTC+2		Report	Adusei 76' (pen.)	Stadium: Free State Stadium; Attendance: 6,500; Referee: Gehad Grisha (Egypt)

26 January 2014 2014 African Nations Championship – Quarter-Final	Ghana	1–0	DR Congo	Bloemfontein, South Africa
17:00 UTC+2	Adusei 68' (pen.)	Report		Stadium: Free State Stadium; Attendance: 12,000; Referee: Ali Lemghaifry (Mauritania)

29 January 2014 2014 African Nations Championship – Semi-final	Nigeria	0–0 (a.e.t.) (1–4 p)	Ghana	Bloemfontein, South Africa
20:30 UTC+2		Report		Stadium: Free State Stadium; Attendance: 7,000; Referee: Janny Sikazwe (Zambia)
	Penalties
	Uzoenyi (penalty scored); Kwambe (penalty missed); Ogonna (penalty missed)		Akuffu (penalty scored); Annorbaah (penalty scored); Ainooson (penalty scored); Attobrah (penalty scored)

1 February 2014 2014 African Nations Championship – Final	Libya	0–0 (a.e.t.) (4–3 p)	Ghana	Cape Town, South Africa
20:00 UTC+2		Report		Stadium: Cape Town Stadium; Attendance: 16,505; Referee: Mohamed Benouza (Algeria)
	Penalties
	Al Badri (penalty scored); Al Mahdi (penalty scored); Al Maghasi (penalty scored); Elgadi (penalty missed); Omar (penalty missed); El Trbi (penalty scored)		Akuffu (penalty missed); Ainooson (penalty missed); Attobrah (penalty scored); Saka (penalty scored); Owusu (penalty scored); Joshua (penalty missed)

5 March 2014 International Friendly	Montenegro	1–0	Ghana	Podgorica, Montenegro
18:00 UTC+2	Damjanović 1' (pen.)	Report		Stadium: Stadion pod Goricom; Attendance: 5,500; Referee: Vlado Glodjović (Serbia)

31 May 2014 International Friendly	Netherlands	1–0	Ghana	Rotterdam, Netherlands
20:30 UTC+2	van Persie 5'	Report		Stadium: Stadion Feijenoord; Attendance: 51,117; Referee: Carlos Miguel Taborda Xistra (Portugal)

9 June 2014 International Friendly	South Korea	0–4	Ghana	Miami, United States
19:00 UTC−5		Report	J. Ayew 11', 53', 89'; Gyan 44'	Stadium: Sun Life Stadium; Attendance: 7,000; Referee: David Gantar (Canada)

16 June 2014 2014 World Cup – Group G	Ghana	1–2	United States	Natal, Brazil
19:00 UTC+3	A. Ayew 82'	Report	Dempsey 1'; Brooks 86'	Stadium: Arena das Dunas; Attendance: 39,760; Referee: Jonas Eriksson (Sweden)

21 June 2014 2014 World Cup – Group G	Germany	2–2	Ghana	Fortaleza, Brazil
16:00 UTC+3	Götze 51'; Klose 71'	Report	A. Ayew 54'; Gyan 63'	Stadium: Estádio Castelão, Fortaleza; Attendance: 59,621; Referee: Sandro Ricci (Brazil)

26 June 2014 2014 World Cup – Group G	Portugal	2–1	Ghana	Brasília, Brazil
13:00 UTC+3	Boye 31' (o.g.); Ronaldo 80'	Report	Gyan 57'	Stadium: Estádio Nacional Mané Garrincha; Attendance: 67,540; Referee: Nawaf Shukralla (Bahrain)

5 September 2014 2015 Africa Cup of Nations qualification – Group E	Ghana	1–1	Uganda	Kumasi, Ghana
16:00 UTC±0	A. Ayew 50' (pen.)	Report	Mawejje 45'	Stadium: Baba Yara Stadium; Referee: Mohamed Said Kordi (Tunisia)

10 September 2014 2015 Africa Cup of Nations qualification – Group E	Togo	2–3	Ghana	Lomé, Togo
16:00 UTC±0	F. Ayité 11'; Adebayor 76'	Report	Gyan 23'; Agyemang-Badu 34'; Atsu 85'	Stadium: Stade de Kégué; Referee: Mohamed Benouza (Algeria)

10 October 2014 2015 Africa Cup of Nations qualification – Group E	Guinea	1–1	Ghana	Casablanca, Morocco
17:00 UTC+1	Traoré 81'	Report (CAF)	Gyan 27'	Stadium: Stade Mohamed V Referee: Omar Mohamed Ragab (Libya)

15 October 2014 2015 Africa Cup of Nations qualification – Group E	Ghana	3–1	Guinea	Accra, Greater Accra, Ghana
16:00 UTC+0	Gyan 14'; A. Ayew 57' (pen.); Agyemang-Badu 90+6'	Report (CAF)	Yattara 34'	Stadium: Accra Sports Stadium; Referee: Bernard Camille (Seychelles)

14 November 2014 2015 Africa Cup of Nations qualification – Group E	Uganda	1–0	Ghana	Kampala, Uganda
16:00 UTC+3	Kabugo 10'	Report (CAF)		Stadium: National Stadium; Referee: Mohamed Hussein El-Fadil (Sudan)

19 November 2014 2015 Africa Cup of Nations qualification – Group E	Ghana	3–1	Togo	Kumasi, Ashanti, Ghana
UTC+0	Waris 22'; Mubarak 26'; Ouro-Akoriko 78' (o.g.)	Report (CAF)	Segbefia 47'	Stadium: Kumasi Sports Stadium; Referee: Bakary Gassama (Gambia)

== 2015 ==
19 January 2015 2015 Africa Cup of Nations GS	Ghana	1–2	Senegal	Mongomo, Equatorial Guinea
16:00 UTC	A. Ayew 14' (pen.)	Report	Diouf 58'; Sow 90+3'	Stadium: Estadio de Mongomo; Attendance: 13,569; Referee: Bernard Camille (Seychelles)

23 January 2015 2015 Africa Cup of Nations GS	Ghana	1–0	Algeria	Mongomo, Equatorial Guinea
16:00 UTC	Gyan 90+2'	Report		Stadium: Estadio de Mongomo; Attendance: 12,387; Referee: Koman Coulibaly (Mali)

27 January 2015 2015 Africa Cup of Nations GS	South Africa	1–2	Ghana	Mongomo, Equatorial Guinea
18:00 UTC	Masango 17'	Report	Boye 73'; A. Ayew 83'	Stadium: Estadio de Mongomo; Attendance: 13,670; Referee: Hamada Nampiandraza (Madagascar)

1 February 2015 2015 Africa Cup of Nations QF	Ghana	3–0	Guinea	Malabo, Equatorial Guinea
16:00 UTC	Atsu 4', 61'; Appiah 44'	Report		Stadium: Estadio de Malabo; Referee: Janny Sikazwe (Zambia)

5 February 2015 2015 Africa Cup of Nations SF	Ghana	3–0	Equatorial Guinea	Malabo, Equatorial Guinea
19:00 UTC	J. Ayew 42' (pen.); Mubarak 45+1'; A. Ayew 75'	Report		Stadium: Estadio de Malabo; Referee: Eric Otogo-Castane (Gabon)

8 February 2015 2015 Africa Cup of Nations Final	Ivory Coast	0–0 (a.e.t.) (9–8 p)	Ghana	Bata, Equatorial Guinea
19:00 UTC		Report		Stadium: Estadio de Bata; Attendance: 38,000; Referee: Bakary Gassama (Gambia)
	Penalties
	Bony (penalty missed); Tallo (penalty missed); Aurier (penalty scored); Doumbia (penalty scored); Y. Touré (penalty scored); Kalou (penalty scored); K. Touré (penalty scored); Kanon (penalty scored); Bailly (penalty scored); Die (penalty scored); Barry (penalty scored)		(penalty scored) Wakaso; (penalty scored) J. Ayew; (penalty missed) Acquah; (penalty missed) Acheampong; (penalty scored) A. Ayew; (penalty scored) Mensah; (penalty scored) Badu; (penalty scored) Afful; (penalty scored) Baba; (penalty scored) Boye; (penalty missed) Razak

25 March 2015 Friendly	Ghana	1–0	Namibia	Ashanti, Ghana
16:00 UTC	Baffour 90+3'	Report		Stadium: Baba Yara Stadium, Kumasi

28 March 2015 Friendly	Ghana	1–2	Senegal	Le Havre, France
19:45 UTC	Boakye 84'	Report	Konaté 66', 76'	Stadium: Stade Océane; Attendance: 5,446; Referee: Darren Bond (England)

31 March 2015 Friendly	Ghana	1–1	Mali	Paris, France
19:30 UTC	Badu 52'	Report	Sako 71' (pen.)	Stadium: Stade Sébastien Charléty; Attendance: 2,000; Referee: Saïd Ennjimi (France)

25 May 2015 Friendly	Ghana	1–2	Madagascar	Phokeng, South Africa
15:00 UTC	Darkwah 39'	Report	Randriamanjaka 27'; Simouri 90'	Stadium: Royal Bafokeng Stadium; Referee: Joshua Bondo (Botswana)

27 May 2015 Friendly	Zambia	3–0	Ghana	Phokeng, South Africa
15:00 UTC	Mwape 25'; Katebe 29'; Sinkala 42'	Report		Stadium: Royal Bafokeng Stadium; Attendance: 2,000; Referee: Nelson Fred (Seychelles)

8 June 2015 Friendly	Ghana	1–0	Togo	Accra, Ghana
15:30 UTC	B. Mensah 38'; Wakaso (red card) 78'	Report		Stadium: Ohene Djan Stadium; Attendance: 4,000; Referee: Abdullahi Shuaibu (Nigeria)

14 June 2015 2017 Africa Cup of Nations Q GS	Ghana	7–1	Mauritius	Accra, Ghana
15:30 UTC	Atsu 10'; J. Ayew 17', 37'; Gyan 22', 29'; Schlupp 65'; Accam 89'	Report	Sophie 31'	Stadium: Ohene Djan Stadium; Referee: Fidel Gomes (Guinea-Bissau)

1 September 2015 Friendly	Congo	2–3	Ghana	Brazzaville, Congo
13:00 UTC	Babélé 54'; Binguila 90'	Report	Babélé 17' (o.g.); Boakye 19'; J. Ayew 90+4'	Stadium: Stade de l'Unité; Referee: Jean-Jacques Ndala Ngambo (DR Congo)

5 September 2015 2017 Africa Cup of Nations Q GS	Rwanda	0–1	Ghana	Kigali, Rwanda
15:30 UTC		Report	Wakaso 87'	Stadium: Stade Amahoro; Referee: Hagi Wiish (Somalia)

13 October 2015 Friendly	Canada	1–1	Ghana	Washington, D.C., United States
19:30 (UTC-4)	de Jong 29'	Report	Adomah 44'	Stadium: RFK Stadium

17 October 2015 2016 CHAN Q	Ghana	2-1	Ivory Coast	Kumasi, Ghana
17:00 UTC	Fameyeh; 35' Fameyeh 73'	Report	Ibrahim	Stadium: Baba Yara Stadium

13 November 2015 2018 World Cup Q	Comoros	0-0	Ghana	Comoros
UTC

17 November 2015 2018 World Cup Q	Ghana	2-0	Comoros	Accra, Ghana
15:30 UTC				Stadium: Ohene Djan Stadium

== 2016 ==
24 March 2016 2017 Africa Cup of Nations Q GS	Ghana	3–1	Mozambique	Accra, Ghana
15:30 GMT	Acheampong 5'; Boye 55'; J. Ayew 57'	Report	Manjate 66'	Stadium: Accra Sports Stadium; Referee: Bouchaïb El Ahrach (Morocco)

27 March 2016 2017 Africa Cup of Nations Q GS	Mozambique	0–0	Ghana	Maputo, Mozambique
15:00 CAT				Stadium: Estádio do Zimpeto; Referee: Denis Batte (Uganda)

3 June 2016 2017 Africa Cup of Nations Q GS	Mauritius	0–2	Ghana	Belle Vue Maurel, Mauritius
15:00 MUT		Report	A. Ayew 70'; Atsu 73'	Stadium: Stade Anjalay; Referee: Bamlak Tessema Weyesa (Ethiopia)

3 September 2016 2017 Africa Cup of Nations Q GS	Ghana	1–1	Rwanda	Accra, Ghana
15:30 GMT	Tetteh 23'	Report	Hakizimana 83'	Stadium: Accra Sports Stadium; Referee: Antoine Effa (Cambodia)

6 September 2016 Friendly	Russia	1–0	Ghana	Moscow, Russia
19:00 MSK	Smolov 20'	Report		Stadium: Lokomotiv Stadium; Attendance: 20,000; Referee: Aliyar Aghayev (Azerbaijan)

7 October 2016 2018 WCQ R3	Ghana	0–0	Uganda	Tamale, Ghana
15:30 GMT		Report		Stadium: Tamale Stadium; Attendance: 19,000; Referee: El Fadil Mohamed (Sudan)

11 October 2016 Friendly	South Africa	1–1	Ghana	Durban, South Africa
	Patosi 52'	Report	Wakaso 38' (pen.)	Stadium: Moses Mabhida Stadium; Attendance: 9,674; Referee: Janny Sikazwe (Zambia)

13 November 2016 2018 WCQ R3	Egypt	2–0	Ghana	Alexandria, Egypt
18:00 EET	M. Salah 43' (pen.); Said 86'	Report		Stadium: Borg El Arab Stadium; Referee: Eric Otogo-Castane (Gabon)

== 2017 ==
17 January 2017 2017 Africa Cup of Nations GS	Ghana	1–0	Uganda	Port-Gentil, Gabon
17:00 WAT	A. Ayew 32' (pen.)	Report		Stadium: Stade de Port-Gentil; Referee: Joshua Bondo (Botswana)

21 January 2017 2017 Africa Cup of Nations GS	Ghana	1–0	Mali	Port-Gentil, Gabon
17:00 WAT	Gyan 21'	Report		Stadium: Stade de Port-Gentil; Referee: Mehdi Abid Charef (Algeria)

25 January 2017 2017 Africa Cup of Nations GS	Egypt	1–0	Ghana	Port-Gentil, Gabon
20:00 WAT	M. Salah 11'	Report		Stadium: Stade de Port-Gentil; Referee: Bakary Gassama (Gambia)

29 January 2017 2017 AFCON QF	DR Congo	1–2	Ghana	Oyem, Gabon
17:00 WAT	M'Poku 68'	Report	J. Ayew 63'; A. Ayew 78' (pen.)	Stadium: Stade d'Oyem; Referee: Bernard Camille (Seychelles)

2 February 2017 2017 AFCON SF	Cameroon	2–0	Ghana	Franceville, Gabon
20:00 WAT	Ngadeu-Ngadjui 72'; Bassogog 90+3'	Report		Stadium: Stade de Franceville; Referee: Bakary Gassama (Gambia)

4 February 2017 2017 AFCON 3rd place match	Burkina Faso	1–0	Ghana	Port-Gentil, Gabon
20:00 WAT	Al. Traoré 89'	Report		Stadium: Stade de Port-Gentil; Referee: Mehdi Abid Charef (Algeria)

25 May 2017 Friendly	Ghana	1–1	Benin	Accra, Ghana
15:30 GMT	Awal 44' (pen.)	Report	Ogoulola 20'	Stadium: Accra Sports Stadium; Attendance: 1,000; Referee: Prosper Adii (Ghana)

11 June 2017 2019 AFCONQ	Ghana	5–0	Ethiopia	Kumasi, Ghana
15:30 GMT	Gyan 10'; Boye 15'; Ofori 35'; Dwamena 48', 70'	Report		Stadium: Baba Yara Stadium; Referee: Maguette N'Diaye (Senegal)

28 June 2017 Friendly	Mexico	1–0	Ghana	Houston, United States
20:00 CDT	E. Hernández 32' (pen.)	Report		Stadium: NRG Stadium; Attendance: 37,617; Referee: Baldomero Toledo (United States)

1 July 2017 Friendly	United States	2–1	Ghana	East Hartford, United States
16:45	Dwyer 19'; Acosta 52'	Report	Gyan 60'	Stadium: Rentschler Field; Attendance: 28,494; Referee: Ismael Cornejo (El Salvador)

12 August 2017 2018 CHANQ	Burkina Faso	2–2	Ghana	Ouagadougou, Burkina Faso
16:00 GMT	Sylla 58'; Sawadogo 85'	Report	Adams 17' (pen.); Waja 65'	Stadium: Stade du 4 Août; Referee: Issa Sy (Senegal)

20 August 2017 2018 CHANQ	Ghana	1–2 (3–4 agg.)	Burkina Faso	Kumasi, Ghana
15:30 GMT	Addo 61'	Report	Sylla 8'; Nikiema 28'	Stadium: Baba Yara Stadium; Referee: Bienvenu Sinko (Ivory Coast)

1 September 2017 2018 WCQ R3	Ghana	1–1	Congo	Kumasi, Ghana
15:30 GMT	Partey 85'	Report	Bifouma 18'	Stadium: Baba Yara Stadium; Referee: Youssef Essrayri (Tunisia)

5 September 2017 2018 WCQ R3	Congo	1–5	Ghana	Brazzaville, Congo
15:30 WAT	Illoy-Ayyet 43'	Report	Boakye 23', 85'; Partey 26', 45+2', 69'	Stadium: Stade Municipal de Kintélé; Referee: Rédouane Jiyed (Morocco)

9 September 2017 2017 WAFU Nations Cup 1st round	Ghana	1–0	Gambia	Cape Coast, Ghana
15:00 GMT	Antigah 90+9' (pen.)	Report		Stadium: Cape Coast Sports Stadium; Referee: Boukari Ouedraogo (Burkina Faso)

14 September 2017 2017 WAFU Nations Cup GS	Ghana	2–0	Guinea	Cape Coast, Ghana
18:00 GMT	Sa. Sarfo 48'; Kizito 77'	Report		Stadium: Cape Coast Sports Stadium; Referee: Yanissou Bebou (Togo)

16 September 2017 2017 WAFU Nations Cup GS	Ghana	1–0	Mali	Cape Coast, Ghana
18:00 GMT	Cobbinah 73'	Report		Stadium: Cape Coast Sports Stadium; Referee: Jerry Yekeh (Liberia)

18 September 2017 2017 WAFU Nations Cup GS	Ghana	0–2	Nigeria	Cape Coast, Ghana
18:00 GMT	Okpotu 52'; Peter 55'	Report		Stadium: Cape Coast Sports Stadium; Referee: Kouassi Fredéric Biro (Ivory Coast)

21 September 2017 2017 WAFU Nations Cup SF	Ghana	2–0	Niger	Cape Coast, Ghana
18:00 GMT	Kizito 31'; St. Safro 79'	Report		Stadium: Cape Coast Sports Stadium; Referee: Yanissou Bebou (Togo)

24 September 2017 2017 WAFU Nations Cup Final	Ghana	4–1	Nigeria	Cape Coast, Ghana
18:00 GMT	St. Sarfo 44', 78' (pen.); Antigah 60' (pen.); Cobbinah 93'	Report	Ali 90+5'	Stadium: Cape Coast Sports Stadium; Referee: Daouda Gueye (Senegal)

7 October 2017 2018 WCQ R3	Uganda	0–0	Ghana	Kampala, Uganda
16:00 EAT		Report		Stadium: Mandela National Stadium; Referee: Daniel Bennett (South Africa)

10 October 2017 Friendly	Saudi Arabia	0–3	Ghana	Jeddah, Saudi Arabia
		Report

12 November 2017 2018 WCQ R3	Ghana	1–1	Egypt	Kumasi, Ghana
15:30 GMT	Gyasi 64'	Report	Shikabala	Stadium: Baba Yara Stadium; Referee: Malang Diedhiou (Senegal)

== 2018 ==
30 May 2018 Friendly	Japan	0–2	Ghana	Yokohama, Japan
19:25 (UTC+9)		Report	Partey 9'; Boateng 51' (pen.)	Stadium: Nissan Stadium (Yokohama); Attendance: 64,520; Referee: Chris Beath (Australia)

7 June 2018 Friendly	Iceland	2–2	Ghana	Reykjavík, Iceland
20:00 (UTC±0)	Árnason 6'; Finnbogason 40'	Report	Nuhu 66'; Partey 87'	Stadium: Laugardalsvöllur; Referee: Bobby Madley (England)

8 September 2018 2019 AFCONQ	Kenya	1–0	Ghana	Kasarani, Kenya
16:00 (UTC+3)	Opoku 40' (o.g.)	Report		Stadium: Moi International Sports Centre; Referee: Janny Sikazwe (Zambia)

18 November 2018 2019 AFCONQ	Ethiopia	0–2	Ghana	Addis Ababa, Ethiopia
16:00 (UTC+3)		Report	J. Ayew 3', 24' (pen.)	Stadium: Addis Ababa Stadium; Referee: Victor Gomes (South Africa)

== 2019 ==
23 March 2019 2019 AFCONQ	Ghana	1–0	Kenya	Accra, Ghana
18:00 (UTC±0)	Ekuban 82'	Report		Stadium: Accra Sports Stadium; Referee: Joshua Bondo (Botswana)

26 March 2019 Friendly	Ghana	3–1	Mauritania	Accra, Ghana
16:30 (UTC±0)	Appiah 3' (pen.); Ekuban 70'; Partey 72'		Ba 48'	Stadium: Accra Sports Stadium

9 June 2019 Friendly	Ghana	0–1	Namibia	Dubai, United Arab Emirates
			Starke 31'

15 June 2019 Friendly	Ghana	0–0	South Africa	Dubai, United Arab Emirates
17:30 (UTC+4)		Report		Stadium: Police Officers' Club Stadium; Attendance: 235

25 June 2019 2019 AFCON	Ghana	2–2	Benin	Ismailia, Egypt
22:00 (UTC+2)	A. Ayew 9'; J. Ayew 42'	Report	Poté 2', 63'	Stadium: Ismailia Stadium; Attendance: 8,094; Referee: Youssef Essrayri (Tunisia)

29 June 2019 2019 AFCON	Cameroon	0–0	Ghana	Ismailia, Egypt
19:00 (UTC+2)		Report		Stadium: Ismailia Stadium; Attendance: 16,724; Referee: Bamlak Tessema Weyesa (Ethiopia)

2 July 2019 2019 AFCON	Guinea-Bissau	0–2	Ghana	Suez, Egypt
18:00 (UTC+2)		Report	J. Ayew 46'; Partey 72'	Stadium: Suez Stadium; Referee: Eric Otogo-Castane (Gabon)

8 July 2019 2019 AFCON	Ghana	1–1 (a.e.t.) (4–5 p)	Tunisia	Ismailia, Egypt
21:00 (UTC+2)	Bedoui 90+1' (o.g.)	Report	Khenissi 73'	Stadium: Ismailia Stadium; Referee: Victor Gomes (South Africa)
	Penalties
	Wakaso (penalty scored); J. Ayew (penalty scored); Ekuban (penalty missed); Agbenyenu (penalty scored); Partey (penalty scored)		(penalty scored) Sliti; (penalty scored) Khazri; (penalty scored) Bronn; (penalty scored) Meriah; (penalty scored) Sassi
