= David Telfer =

Ghanaian footballer (born 1988)

Personal information
- Full name: David Telfer
- Date of birth: 1 December 1988 (age 37)
- Place of birth: Obuasi, Ghana
- Position: Defensive midfielder

Team information
- Current team: Ashanti Gold SC
- Number: 4

Youth career
- AshantiGold Soccer Academy

Senior career*
Years	Team	Apps	(Gls)
2006–2014	Ashanti Gold SC		
2008	→ Free State Stars (loan)		
2010–2011	→ CSCA–Rapid Chişinău (loan)	4	(0)

International career
2009	Ghana	1	(0)
- * Club domestic league appearances and goals

David Telfer (born 1 December 1988 in Obuasi) is a Ghanaian footballer, who last played for Ashanti Gold SC.

== Career ==
Telfer began his career in the Ashanti Gold Soccer Academy and was promoted to Ashanti Gold SC of the Ghana Premier League in January 2006.

In August 2008 from Ashanti Gold SC out to Free State Stars, he joined with teammate Jonathan Mensah.

Telfer returned to Ghana and registered for Ashanti Gold SC for the 2009–2010 season. He is an integral member of the team and produced several sterling performances. In September 2010, he signed with the Moldovan side CSCA-Rapid Chişinău and played four matches during the 2010/2011 season in the Divizia Naţională. In August 2011 returned to Ashanti Gold SC.

== International career ==
David Telfer was named in the Ghana under-17 squad for the 2005 FIFA World Youth Championship squads.[7]
Telfer played for the Meteors[8] and 2007 for the Black Stars,[9]  He earned his debut on 14 August 2009 against Zambia national football team for the Ghana national football team, he came on as a 2nd half substitute in the game.[citation needed]
