= Willie Telfer (Scottish footballer) =

Scottish footballer

Personal information
- Full name: William Telfer
- Place of birth: Scotland
- Position: Outside right

Youth career
- Jordanhill Training College

Senior career*
| Years | Team | Apps | (Gls) |
| 1961–1963 | Queen's Park | 1 | (0) |

International career
| 1960–1963 | Scotland Amateurs | 2 | (2) |
- * Club domestic league appearances and goals

William Telfer is a retired amateur Scottish football outside right who made one appearance in the Scottish League for Queen's Park. He captained Scotland at amateur level.
