= Garry Telfer =

Scottish footballer

Garry Telfer (19 January 1965 – 19 July 2007) was a Scottish professional association footballer. A midfielder, Telfer played for home-town club Queen of the South, as he was born in Dumfries.

== Career ==
Telfer joined the Doonhamers after playing for Dumfries YMCA. He spent two spells at Queens sandwiched around four seasons at Annan Athletic. At Queens, Telfer played 54 league games having scored seven goals. After his second spell at Queens, Telfer played for Dalbeattie Star.

A crew manager with Dumfries and Galloway Fire and Rescue, Telfer was attending a fire in the Troqueer area of Dumfries on Tuesday 17 July 2007. He suddenly took ill at the scene and died later at Dumfries & Galloway Royal Infirmary, aged 42. A charity golf event has been held in his memory.
