= 2017 Pittsburgh Riverhounds season =

Pittsburgh Riverhounds
2017 season
- Owner: Terry "Tuffy" Shallenberger
- Head coach: Dave Brandt
- United Soccer League: 13th in Eastern Conference
- U.S. Open Cup: Second round (knocked out by Chicago FC United)
- Keystone Derby Cup: Champions (4–0)
- Top goalscorer: League: Corey Hertzog (14); All: Corey Hertzog (14)
- Highest home attendance: 4,006 (7/4 vs. CLT)
- Lowest home attendance: 950 (5/3 vs. TOR)
- Average home league attendance: 2,639
- Biggest win: HAR 0–3 PIT (8/12)
- Biggest defeat: LOU 3–0 PIT (6/17); PIT 0–3 LOU (9/9)
Home colors	Away colors

The 2017 Pittsburgh Riverhounds season was the club's eighteenth season of existence, and their seventh consecutive season in the United Soccer League, the second tier of American soccer. Pittsburgh also competed in the U.S. Open Cup. The season covered the period from September 25, 2016, to the beginning of the 2018 USL season.

The Riverhounds won the Keystone Derby Cup over Harrisburg City Islanders, the second time since the cup was introduced that the Riverhounds won the trophy. After defeating Harrisburg 1–0 on April 29, Pittsburgh went to FNB Field for the last two meetings between the teams, a 0–0 draw on May 24 and a 3–0 Pittsburgh win on August 12.

Pittsburgh finished 13th in the Eastern Conference, missing the playoffs for the second consecutive season and the tenth time in the club's history. Although the Riverhounds increased from 25 to 36 points from 2016 to 2017, they still finished eight points behind Bethlehem Steel FC for the final playoff spot in the conference.

== Non-competitive ==
=== Preseason ===
February 18 Friendly	North Carolina FC	1–1	Pittsburgh Riverhounds	Cary, NC
10:00 AM EST	Tobin 8'	Report	Green 87'	Stadium: WakeMed Soccer Park

February 19 Friendly	Duke Blue Devils	0–2	Pittsburgh Riverhounds	Durham, NC
11:00 AM EST		Report	Kerr 53'; Okai 55'	Stadium: Athletic Field Complex

February 25 Friendly	Pittsburgh Riverhounds	3–0	Akron Zips	Pittsburgh, PA
1:00 PM EST	Hollingsworth 53'; Hertzog 55', 67' (pen.)	Report		Stadium: Highmark Stadium

March 4 Friendly	Pittsburgh Panthers	1–3	Pittsburgh Riverhounds	Pittsburgh, PA
1:00 PM EST	Brezniak 33'	Report	Kerr 30'; Hertzog 64'; Banjo 86'	Stadium: Ambrose Urbanic Field

March 5 Friendly	Pittsburgh Riverhounds	1–1	Charleston Golden Eagles	Pittsburgh, PA
1:00 PM EST	Hertzog 51'	Report	Roberts 67'	Stadium: Highmark Stadium

March 13 Friendly	Rochester Rhinos	5–1	Pittsburgh Riverhounds	Victor, NY
3:00 PM EDT	Boukemia 32'; Graf 52'; Beresford 93'; Kamdem 94'; Forbes	Report	N. Thompson 61'	Stadium: Pinnacle Athletic Complex

== Competitions ==
=== USL ===
==== Standings ====
Pos	Team	Pld	W	D	L	GF	GA	GD	Pts
11	Harrisburg City Islanders	32	10	7	15	28	47	−19	37
12	Saint Louis FC	32	9	9	14	35	48	−13	36
13	Pittsburgh Riverhounds	32	8	12	12	33	42	−9	36
14	Richmond Kickers	32	8	8	16	24	36	−12	32
15	Toronto FC II	32	6	7	19	27	54	−27	25

Source: 2017 USL standings
Rules for classification: 1) total wins; 2) total goal differential; 3) total goals scored; 4) points earned against top four Conference finishers; 5) disciplinary points; 6) coin toss or drawing of lots

==== Results summary ====
Overall								Home						Away					
Pld	Pts	W	L	T	GF	GA	GD	W	L	T	GF	GA	GD	W	L	T	GF	GA	GD
32	36	8	12	12	33	42	−9	4	7	5	18	24	−6	4	5	7	15	18	−3

Source: USL standings
Pld = Matches played; Pts = Points; W = Matches won; T = Matches tied; L = Matches lost; GF = Goals for; GA = Goals against; GD = Goal difference

==== Results by round ====
Round	1	2	3	4	5	6	7	8	9	10	11	12	13	14	15	16	17	18	19	20	21	22	23	24	25	26	27	28	29	30	31	32
Stadium	H	H	A	H	A	A	H	H	A	H	A	H	A	A	H	H	A	A	A	H	A	H	A	A	H	A	H	H	A	A	H	H
Result	D	L	W	L	D	L	W	W	W	L	D	L	D	L	W	L	D	D	D	D	L	D	W	W	W	D	L	D	L	L	L	D

Source: Pittsburgh schedule
A = Away; H = Home; W = Win; D = Draw; L = Loss

==== Match results ====
March 25 1	Pittsburgh Riverhounds	3–3	New York Red Bulls II	Pittsburgh, PA
4:00 PM EDT	Hertzog 9', 81' (pen.), (yellow card) 77'; Kerr 39'; Okai (yellow card) 48'; Hollingsworth (yellow card) 60'; Souto (yellow card) 77'; Adeleye (yellow card) 87'	Report	Valot 6'; Bezecourt 16', 76' (pen.)	Stadium: Highmark Stadium; Attendance: 3,352; Referee: Charles Murphy

April 1 2	Pittsburgh Riverhounds	0–1	FC Cincinnati	Pittsburgh, PA
5:00 PM EDT	Agbossoumonde (yellow card) 32', (yellow card) 43' (red card); Washington (yellow card) 85'	Report	Dacres (yellow card) 45+1'; Djiby 55'; Mansaray (yellow card) 85'	Stadium: Highmark Stadium; Attendance: 2,586; Referee: Guido Gonzalez Jr.

April 8 3	Charleston Battery	1–2	Pittsburgh Riverhounds	Charleston, SC
7:00 PM EDT	Guerra 8'; Williams (yellow card) 44'; Portillo (yellow card) 85'	Report	Hollingsworth 59'; Obinwa (yellow card) 73'; Hertzog 90+1'	Stadium: MUSC Health Stadium; Attendance: 2,425; Referee: Aleksandar Zhelyazkov

April 12 4	Pittsburgh Riverhounds	1–2	Saint Louis FC	Pittsburgh, PA
7:00 PM EDT	Banjo 5'	Report	Angulo 30'; Howe (yellow card) 42'; Volesky 68'	Stadium: Highmark Stadium; Attendance: 3,083; Referee: Lucas Feathers

April 15 5	Charlotte Independence	1–1	Pittsburgh Riverhounds	Rock Hill, SC
7:00 PM EDT	Herrera 7' (pen.)	Report	Banjo 2'; Earls (yellow card) 19'; Greenspan (yellow card) 78'	Stadium: Eagle Field; Attendance: 1,030; Referee: Eric Usher

April 22 6	Richmond Kickers	2–1	Pittsburgh Riverhounds	Richmond, VA
5:00 PM EDT	Owusu Sekyere 15'; Kamara 47'	Report	Hollingsworth 60'	Stadium: City Stadium; Attendance: 1,567; Referee: Mark Gorak

April 29 7	Pittsburgh Riverhounds	1–0	Harrisburg City Islanders	Pittsburgh, PA
7:00 PM EDT	Greenspan (yellow card) 45+1'; Washington (yellow card) 58'; Howell (yellow card) 72'; Hertzog 75'	Report	Mohammed (yellow card) 40', (yellow card) 52' (red card); Olabiyi (yellow card) 45+2'; Tiago (yellow card) 84'; Miller (red card) 90+5'	Stadium: Highmark Stadium; Attendance: 2,513; Referee: Calin Radosav

May 3 8	Pittsburgh Riverhounds	1–0	Toronto FC II	Pittsburgh, PA
7:00 PM EDT	Souto 22'	Report		Stadium: Highmark Stadium; Attendance: 950; Referee: Matthew Franz

May 13 9	Ottawa Fury FC	0–1	Pittsburgh Riverhounds	Ottawa, ON
2:00 PM EDT	Rozeboom (yellow card) 88'; Manesio (yellow card) 90'	Report	Washington (yellow card) 39'; Hertzog 52'	Stadium: TD Place Stadium; Attendance: 3,024; Referee: Carol Anne Chenard

May 20 10	Pittsburgh Riverhounds	0–1	Louisville City	Pittsburgh, PA
7:00 PM EDT	Abubakar (yellow card) 41'	Report	Spencer 7'; Kaye (yellow card) 45'; Craig (yellow card) 75'; DelPiccolo (red card) 87'	Stadium: Highmark Stadium; Attendance: 3,253; Referee: Jonathan Weiner

May 24 11	Harrisburg City Islanders	0–0	Pittsburgh Riverhounds	Harrisburg, PA
6:30 PM EDT	Dabo (yellow card) 29'; Pedro Ribeiro (yellow card) 47'	Report		Stadium: FNB Field; Attendance: 2,061; Referee: Charles Murphy

June 3 12	Pittsburgh Riverhounds	1–2	Orlando City B	Pittsburgh, PA
7:00 PM EDT	Hertzog 30', (yellow card) 73'; Washington (yellow card) 79'	Report	Ellis-Hayden (yellow card) 37', (goal) 53'; Barry 42'	Stadium: Highmark Stadium; Attendance: 3,187; Referee: Danielle Chesky

June 10 13	Toronto FC II	1–1	Pittsburgh Riverhounds	Vaughan, ON
7:30 PM EDT	James (yellow card) 33'; Endoh 59'; Aubrey (yellow card) 64'; Hamilton (yellow card) 77'	Report	Parkes 87'	Stadium: Ontario Soccer Centre; Attendance: 761; Referee: Alexis Vaughan

June 17 14	Louisville City	3–0	Pittsburgh Riverhounds	Louisville, KY
7:30 PM EDT	Lancaster 8', 64'; Davis IV (yellow card) 35'; McCabe 78'	Report	Jack (yellow card) 36'; Washington (yellow card) 71'	Stadium: Louisville Slugger Field; Attendance: 8,741; Referee: Bardhyl Pashaj

June 22 15	Pittsburgh Riverhounds	2–0	Tampa Bay Rowdies	Pittsburgh, PA
7:00 PM EDT	Chevy 11'; Parkes 88'	Report	Vingaard (yellow card) 55'	Stadium: Highmark Stadium; Attendance: 1,977; Referee: Mark Kadlecik

July 4 16	Pittsburgh Riverhounds	1–3	Charlotte Independence	Pittsburgh, PA
7:00 PM EDT	Agbossoumonde (yellow card) 61'; Chevy (yellow card) 65', (goal) 90+1'	Report	E. Martínez 40'; Herrera 62' (pen.), 79'; Johnson (yellow card) 71'	Stadium: Highmark Stadium; Attendance: 4,006; Referee: Lukasz Szpala

July 8 17	Orlando City B	0–0	Pittsburgh Riverhounds	Orlando, FL
7:30 PM EDT	Timbó (yellow card) 78'	Report	Earls (yellow card) 60'; Green (yellow card) 71'; Washington (yellow card) 84'	Stadium: Orlando City Stadium; Attendance: 1,042; Referee: Elvis Osmanovic

July 15 18	Bethlehem Steel FC	1–1	Pittsburgh Riverhounds	Bethlehem, PA
5:00 PM EDT	Chambers 27' (pen.); Moar (yellow card) 36'	Report	Chevy 24'; Jack (yellow card) 34'; Earls (yellow card) 43'; Souto (yellow card) 76'	Stadium: Goodman Stadium; Attendance: 2,990; Referee: Lorant Varga

July 22 19	Rochester Rhinos	0–0	Pittsburgh Riverhounds	Rochester, NY
6:05 PM EDT		Report	Adewole (yellow card) 33'; Souto (yellow card) 73'	Stadium: Capelli Sport Stadium; Attendance: 3,269; Referee: Jaroslaw Werel

July 26 20	Pittsburgh Riverhounds	2–2	Charleston Battery	Pittsburgh, PA
7:00 PM EDT	Souto 21'; Hertzog 62'	Report	Robinson 11'; Mueller (yellow card) 56'; Chang 84'; Thomas (yellow card) 90+1'	Stadium: Highmark Stadium; Attendance: 2,067; Referee: Charles Murphy

July 29 21	Tampa Bay Rowdies	2–0	Pittsburgh Riverhounds	St. Petersburg, FL
7:30 PM EDT	Mkandawire (yellow card) 3'; Morrell 11', 76'; Porter (yellow card) 67'; Pickens (yellow card) 75'	Report	Agbossoumonde (yellow card) 44'; Adewole (yellow card) 75'	Stadium: Al Lang Stadium; Attendance: 5,737; Referee: Rosendo Mendoza

August 5 22	Pittsburgh Riverhounds	1–1	Richmond Kickers	Pittsburgh, PA
7:00 PM EDT	Earls (yellow card) 40'; Okai 82'	Report	Gonzalez 65'	Stadium: Highmark Stadium; Attendance: 3,048; Referee: Henrik Karlsson

August 12 23	Harrisburg City Islanders	0–3	Pittsburgh Riverhounds	Harrisburg, PA
7:00 PM EDT	Mensah (yellow card) 41'; Thomas (yellow card) 61'; Nishanian (yellow card) 85'; Wilson (yellow card) 87'	Report	Parkes 29'; Chevy 56', 76'	Stadium: FNB Field; Attendance: 3,367; Referee: Luis Arroyo

August 19 24	Saint Louis FC	1–2	Pittsburgh Riverhounds	Fenton, MO
8:30 PM EDT	Rudolph 45'; Volesky (yellow card) 45+2'; Grinwis (yellow card) 72'; Walls (yellow card) 79'	Report	Adewole (yellow card) 45+1'; Hertzog 47', 73' (pen.), (yellow card) 90+1'; Souto (yellow card) 51'; Mitchell (yellow card) 65'; Jack (yellow card) 85'	Stadium: Toyota Stadium; Attendance: 4,703; Referee: Lorant Varga

August 26 25	Pittsburgh Riverhounds	3–2	Bethlehem Steel FC	Pittsburgh, PA
7:00 PM EDT	Hertzog 10', (yellow card) 45'; Jack 19', (yellow card) 44'; Adewole (yellow card) 33'; Chevy (yellow card) 45+1'; Kerr 75'	Report	Moar (yellow card) 21'; Burke 42', 71' (pen.); Fontana (yellow card) 89'; Real (yellow card) 89'	Stadium: Highmark Stadium; Attendance: 1,987; Referee: Tori Penso

September 2 26	FC Cincinnati	1–1	Pittsburgh Riverhounds	Cincinnati, OH
4:00 PM EDT	Hildebrandt (yellow card) 34'; Wiedeman 40'; K. Walker (yellow card) 50'; Delbridge (yellow card) 82'	Report	Hertzog 3'; Jack (yellow card) 90+2'	Stadium: Nippert Stadium; Attendance: 22,643; Referee: Joseph Dickerson

September 9 27	Pittsburgh Riverhounds	0–3	Louisville City	Pittsburgh, PA
7:00 PM EDT	Souto (yellow card) 51'	Report	Spencer 33'; Smith 43'; Williams 54' (pen.)	Stadium: Highmark Stadium; Attendance: 1,936; Referee: Jorge Ramirez

September 16 28	Pittsburgh Riverhounds	1–1	Rochester Rhinos	Pittsburgh, PA
7:00 PM EDT	Kerr 71'	Report	Tergou (yellow card) 73'; Farrell 90'	Stadium: Highmark Stadium; Attendance: 2,341; Referee: Greg Dopka

September 24 29	Bethlehem Steel FC	3–2	Pittsburgh Riverhounds	Bethlehem, PA
3:00 PM EDT	Najem 5'; Burke 8', 37'; Trusty (yellow card) 29'; Moar (yellow card) 41'	Report	Okai (yellow card) 34'; Jack (yellow card) 36'; Hertzog 40' (pen.), 64'	Stadium: Goodman Stadium; Attendance: 3,112; Referee: Bardhyl Pashaj

September 30 30	New York Red Bulls II	2–0	Pittsburgh Riverhounds	Montclair, NJ
4:00 PM EDT	Obinwa 25' (o.g.); Valot 90+3'	Report	Washington (yellow card) 57'; Chevy (yellow card) 78'; Parkes (yellow card) 86'	Stadium: MSU Soccer Park at Pittser Field; Attendance: 1,482; Referee: Jonathan Bilinski

October 7 31	Pittsburgh Riverhounds	0–2	Rochester Rhinos	Pittsburgh, PA
7:00 PM EDT	Chevy (yellow card) 57'	Report	Graf 1'; Fall 14', (yellow card) 70'	Stadium: Highmark Stadium; Attendance: 2,400; Referee: Elvis Osmanovic

October 14 32	Pittsburgh Riverhounds	1–1	Ottawa Fury FC	Pittsburgh, PA
7:00 PM EDT	Hertzog (yellow card) 19', (goal) 77' (pen.); Agbossoumonde (yellow card) 34'	Report	DePuy 9'	Stadium: Highmark Stadium; Attendance: 3,540; Referee: Matthew Rodman

=== U.S. Open Cup ===
May 17 Second round	Chicago FC United	3–1	Pittsburgh Riverhounds	Chicago, IL
8:00 PM EDT	Segbers 19'; Samake (yellow card) 23' de Bruijne (yellow card) 30'; Barlow 73'; Sierakowski 90+'	Report	Banjo 52'; Earls (yellow card) 86'	Stadium: Hoyne Field; Attendance: 300; Referee: Alex Beehler

== Statistics ==
=== Appearances and goals ===
No.	Pos.	Name	USL		U.S. Open Cup		Total	
No.	Pos.	Name	Apps	Goals	Apps	Goals	Apps	Goals
1	GK	(Barbados) Keasel Broome	6	0	1	0	7	0
2	DF	(United States) Shane Campbell	0	0	1	0	1	0
3	MF	(United States) Jack Thompson	19	0	0	0	19	0
4	DF	(United States) Taylor Washington	29	0	1	0	30	0
5	MF	(Brazil) Victor Souto	26	2	0	0	26	2
6	MF	(United States) Abuchi Obinwa	7	0	0	0	7	0
7	MF	(Ghana) Stephen Okai	23	1	0	0	23	1
8	MF	(United States) Michael Green	15	0	1	0	16	0
9	FW	(Jamaica) Chevaughn Walsh	22	5	1	0	23	5
10	MF	(Scotland) Kevin Kerr	32	3	1	0	33	3
11	FW	(United States) Corey Hertzog	32	14	1	0	33	14
12	DF	(United States) Ryan Adeleye	2	0	0	0	2	0
14	DF	(United States) Nick Thompson	1	0	1	0	2	0
16	MF	(Republic of Ireland) Danny Earls	10	0	1	0	11	0
17	MF	(Jamaica) Kenroy Howell	14	0	1	0	15	0
18	FW	(United States) Kay Banjo	19	2	1	1	20	3
20	DF	(Trinidad and Tobago) Jamal Jack	28	1	1	0	29	1
21	MF	(United States) Ben Fitzpatrick	9	0	1	0	10	0
22	DF	(United States) Tobi Adewole	15	0	0	0	15	0
23	MF	(United States) Ritchie Duffie	10	0	0	0	10	0
24	DF	(United States) Rich Balchan	6	0	0	0	6	0
25	MF	(United States) Marshall Hollingsworth	20	2	0	0	20	2
27	DF	(United States) Gale Agbossoumonde	11	0	0	0	11	0
29	DF	(United States) Joseph Greenspan	10	0	0	0	10	0
30	GK	(United States) Trey Mitchell	17	0	0	0	17	0
36	FW	(Jamaica) Romeo Parkes	24	3	1	0	25	3
38	DF	(Trinidad and Tobago) Shannon Gomez	10	0	0	0	10	0
40	GK	(United States) Matt Perrella	8	0	0	0	8	0
42	GK	(United States) Brenden Alfery	0	0	0	0	0	0
Players who left the club during the season:
15	FW	(Saint Kitts and Nevis) Devaughn Elliott	0	0	0	0	0	0
19	FW	(Democratic Republic of the Congo) John Manga	0	0	0	0	0	0
26	MF	(United States) Ben Swanson	3	0	0	0	3	0
28	DF	(Ghana) Lalas Abubakar	5	0	0	0	5	0
37	DF	(United States) Connor Maloney	2	0	0	0	2	0
39	GK	(United States) Macklin Robinson	1	0	0	0	1	0
41	GK	(United States) Alex Kapp	1	0	0	0	1	0

Source: Pittsburgh stats

=== Disciplinary record ===
No.	Pos.	Name	USL		U.S. Open Cup		Total	
No.	Pos.	Name	Booked	Sent off (straight red)	Booked	Sent off (straight red)	Booked	Sent off (straight red)
4	DF	(United States) Taylor Washington	7	0	0	0	7	0
5	MF	(Brazil) Victor Souto	5	0	0	0	5	0
6	MF	(United States) Abuchi Obinwa	1	0	0	0	1	0
7	MF	(Ghana) Stephen Okai	2	0	0	0	2	0
8	MF	(United States) Michael Green	1	0	0	0	1	0
9	FW	(Jamaica) Chevaughn Walsh	4	0	0	0	4	0
10	MF	(Scotland) Kevin Kerr	1	0	0	0	1	0
11	FW	(United States) Corey Hertzog	6	0	0	0	6	0
12	DF	(United States) Ryan Adeleye	1	0	0	0	1	0
16	MF	(Republic of Ireland) Danny Earls	4	0	1	0	5	0
17	MF	(Jamaica) Kenroy Howell	1	0	0	0	1	0
20	DF	(Trinidad and Tobago) Jamal Jack	6	0	0	0	6	0
22	DF	(United States) Tobi Adewole	4	0	0	0	4	0
25	MF	(United States) Marshall Hollingsworth	1	0	0	0	1	0
27	DF	(United States) Gale Agbossoumonde	3	1	0	0	3	1
29	DF	(United States) Joseph Greenspan	3	0	0	0	3	0
30	GK	(United States) Trey Mitchell	1	0	0	0	1	0'
36	FW	(United States) Romeo Parkes	1	0	0	0	1	0

Source: Pittsburgh stats

== Transfers ==
=== In ===
Pos.	Player	Previous club	Fee/notes	Date	Source
GK	(Barbados) Keasel Broome	(United States) Harrisburg City Islanders	Free transfer. Signed to a one-year contract.	November 11, 2016	
MF	(United States) Ritchie Duffie	(United States) Fredericksburg FC	Trialist. Signed to a one-year contract.	November 15, 2016	
FW	(Democratic Republic of the Congo) John Manga	(United States) Cincinnati Bearcats	Trialist. Signed to a one-year contract.	November 15, 2016	
FW	(United States) Kay Banjo	(United States) UMBC Retrievers	Trialist. Signed to a one-year contract.	November 23, 2016	
DF	(United States) Shane Campbell	(United States) Harrisburg City Islanders	Free transfer. Signed to a one-year contract.	November 23, 2016	
FW	(Saint Kitts and Nevis) Devaughn Elliott	(Mexico) Murciélagos	Free transfer. Signed to a one-year contract.	December 8, 2016	
MF	(Jamaica) Kenroy Howell	(Jamaica) Waterhouse	Undisclosed fee. Signed to a one-year contract.	December 12, 2016	
MF	(United States) Bryan Arguez	(United States) Fort Lauderdale Strikers	Free transfer. Signed to a one-year contract.	December 15, 2016	
DF	(Trinidad and Tobago) Jamal Jack	(El Salvador) Dragón	Free transfer. Signed to a one-year contract.	December 15, 2016	
DF	(United States) Taylor Washington	(United States) Philadelphia Union	Free transfer. Signed to a one-year contract.	December 20, 2016	
MF	(United States) Ben Fitzpatrick	(United States) Ohio State Buckeyes	Free transfer. Signed to a one-year contract.	December 29, 2016	
MF	(Brazil) Victor Souto	(United States) Akron Zips	Free transfer. Signed to a one-year contract.	December 29, 2016	
DF	(United States) Tobi Adewole	(United States) George Washington Colonials	Free transfer. Signed to a one-year contract.	January 9, 2017	
GK	(United States) Trey Mitchell	(United States) LA Galaxy	Free transfer. Signed to a one-year contract.	January 10, 2017	
DF	(United States) Rich Balchan	(Canada) Ottawa Fury FC	Trialist. Signed to a one-year contract.	March 8, 2017	
DF	(United States) Gale Agbossoumonde	(United States) Fort Lauderdale Strikers	Trialist. Signed to a one-year contract.	March 24, 2017	
FW	(Jamaica) Romeo Parkes	(El Salvador) Isidro Metapán	Free transfer. Signed to a one-year contract.	May 5, 2017	
GK	(United States) Matt Perrella	(United States) New Jersey Copa FC	Free transfer. Signed for the remainder of the 2017 season.	August 10, 2017	
GK	(United States) Brenden Alfery	(United States) Fort Pitt Regiment	Free transfer. Signed for the remainder of the 2017 season.	September 14, 2017	

=== Loan in ===
Pos.	Player	Parent club	Length/Notes	Beginning	End	Source
MF	(United States) Marshall Hollingsworth	(United States) Columbus Crew SC	On a match-by-match basis.	March 4, 2017	October 15, 2017	
MF	(Panama) Cristian Martínez	(United States) Columbus Crew SC	On a match-by-match basis.	March 4, 2017	March 24, 2017	
MF	(United States) Ben Swanson	(United States) Columbus Crew SC	On a match-by-match basis.	March 4, 2017	April 20, 2017	
MF	(United States) Abuchi Obinwa	(United States) Columbus Crew SC	On a match-by-match basis.	March 24, 2017	October 15, 2017	
DF	(Ghana) Lalas Abubakar	(United States) Columbus Crew SC	On a match-by-match basis.	April 6, 2017	July 4, 2017	
DF	(United States) Joseph Greenspan	(United States) Minnesota United FC	One month.	April 10, 2017	May 25, 2017	
DF	(United States) Connor Maloney	(United States) Columbus Crew SC	On a match-by-match basis.	May 19, 2017	July 4, 2017	
DF	(Trinidad and Tobago) Shannon Gomez	(United States) New York City FC	Remainder of the 2017 season.	June 29, 2017	October 15, 2017	
GK	(United States) Macklin Robinson	(United States) North Carolina FC	Short-term.	June 30, 2017	July 5, 2017	
GK	(United States) Alex Kapp	(United States) Minnesota United FC	Remainder of the 2017 season.	August 30, 2017	September 14, 2017	
DF	(United States) Joseph Greenspan	(United States) Minnesota United FC	One match.	September 28, 2017	October 1, 2017	
DF	(United States) Joseph Greenspan	(United States) Minnesota United FC	One match.	October 14, 2017	October 15, 2017	

=== Out ===
Pos.	Player	Transferred to	Fee/notes	Date	Source
GK	(United States) Hunter Gilstrap		Retired.	September 24, 2016	
FW	(Costa Rica) Alejandro Aguilar	(United States) FC Arizona	Contract expired. Signed for FC Arizona on March 2, 2017.	September 25, 2016	
GK	(United States) Brendan Alfery	(United States) Fort Pitt Regiment	Contract expired. Signed for Fort Pitt on April 25, 2017.	September 25, 2016	
FW	(United States) Zak Boggs		Contract expired.	September 25, 2016	
DF	(Jamaica) Sergio Campbell	(United States) Rochester Rhinos	Contract expired. Signed for Rochester on April 3, 2017.	September 25, 2016	
FW	(Canada) Duwayne Ewart	(Canada) Durham United	Contract expired. Signed for Durham in 2017.	September 25, 2016	
DF	(United States) Willie Hunt		Contract expired.	September 25, 2016	
MF	(United States) Nick Kolarac	(United States) Fort Pitt Regiment	Contract expired. Signed for Fort Pitt on April 25, 2017.	September 25, 2016	
MF	(South Africa) Lebogang Moloto	(United States) Swope Park Rangers	Contract expired. Signed for Swope Park on February 6, 2017.	September 25, 2016	
DF	(Canada) Jordan Murrell	(United States) Reno 1868	Contract expired. Signed for Reno on December 20, 2016.	September 25, 2016	
DF	(United States) Drew Russell	(United States) Cedar Rapids Rampage United	Contract expired. Signed for Cedar Rapids on April 15, 2017.	September 25, 2016	
MF	(United States) Bryan Arguez		Released by mutual agreement.	March 24, 2017	
FW	(Saint Kitts and Nevis) Devaughn Elliott	(Guatemala) Antigua GFC	Released by mutual agreement. Had agreed a deal with Antigua on May 19, 2017.	June 16, 2017	
FW	(Democratic Republic of the Congo) John Manga	(United States) Ocean City Nor'easters	Released by mutual agreement. Signed for Ocean City on June 16, 2017.	June 16, 2017	

== Recognition ==
=== USL Player of the Week ===
Week	Player	Opponent	Link
1	(United States) Corey Hertzog	New York Red Bulls II	
23	(Scotland) Kevin Kerr	Bethlehem Steel FC	

=== USL Goal of the Week ===
Week	Player	Opponent	Link
1	(United States) Corey Hertzog	New York Red Bulls II	
7	(Brazil) Victor Souto	Toronto FC II	

=== USL Save of the Week ===
Week	Player	Opponent	Link
14	(Barbados) Keasel Broome	Tampa Bay Rowdies	
29	(United States) Matt Perrella	Rochester Rhinos	

=== USL Save of the Month ===
Month	Player	Opponent	Link
June	(Barbados) Keasel Broome	Tampa Bay Rowdies	

=== Postseason ===
ITB Awards

- Best Win – June 22, 2–0 vs. Tampa Bay Rowdies
- Best Goal – Victor Souto, May 3 vs. Toronto FC II
- Best Kit – Payton's Army Black, worn August 5 vs. Richmond Kickers
- Best Save – Keasel Broome, June 22 vs. Tampa Bay Rowdies

Corey Hertzog – USL All-League Second Team

== Kits ==
Home	Away

Type	Shirt	Shorts	Socks	First appearance / Record
Home	Gold	Black	Gold	Match 1 vs. New York Red Bulls II / 4–8–7
Away	Blue	Blue	Blue	Match 3 vs. Charleston Battery / 4–3–3
Specialty	Camouflage	Black	Black	Match 10 vs. Louisville City / 0–0–1
Specialty	Black	Black	Black	Match 22 vs. Richmond Kickers / 0–1–0
Specialty	Pink	Black	Black	Match 31 vs. Rochester Rhinos / 0–0–1

== See also ==
- 2017 in American soccer
- 2017 USL season
