= 2016 Pittsburgh Riverhounds season =

Pittsburgh Riverhounds
2016 season
- Chairman: Tuffy Shallenberger (acting)
- Manager: Dave Brandt (from May 23, 2016); Mark Steffens (until May 22, 2016)
- Stadium: Highmark Stadium
- USL: 13th
- U.S. Open Cup: Second Round
- Top goalscorer: League: Corey Hertzog (13); All: Corey Hertzog (13)

The 2016 Pittsburgh Riverhounds season was the club's seventeenth season of existence. It is the Riverhounds' six season playing in the United Soccer League, and the club's fourth season hosting matches at soccer-specific Highmark Stadium.

== Preseason ==
On November 2, 2015, it was announced that Richard Nightingale was no longer with the team and that Shallenberger had taken over as acting president. After one season without an MLS affiliate, it was announced that the club had formed an affiliate partnership with the reigning Eastern Conference playoff champion and MLS Cup runner-up Columbus Crew SC for the 2016 season.

== Competitions ==
=== Preseason ===
February 28, 2016 Preseason	Penn State Nittany Lions	1–2	Pittsburgh Riverhounds	State College, Pennsylvania
5:00 p.m. EST	Sigue 53'	Report	Moloto 45'; Ewart 81'	Stadium: Holuba Hall

March 6, 2016 Preseason	Pittsburgh Riverhounds	3–0	Ohio State Buckeyes	Pittsburgh, Pennsylvania
2:00 p.m. EST	Okai 43', 71' (pen.); Parkes 65'	Report		Stadium: Highmark Stadium

March 13, 2016 Preseason	Pittsburgh Riverhounds	1–2	Michigan Wolverines	Pittsburgh, Pennsylvania
1:00 p.m. EST	Parkes	Report	Mertz 2'; Anderson	Stadium: Highmark Stadium

March 18, 2016 Preseason	Pittsburgh Riverhounds	0–1	Akron Zips	Akron, Ohio
6:00 p.m. EST		Report	Campbell 87' (o.g.)	Stadium: FirstEnergy Stadium–Cub Cadet Field

=== U.S. Open Cup ===
May 18 Second Round	Pittsburgh Riverhounds (Pennsylvania)	0–2	(New York (state)) Lansdowne Bhoys FC	Pittsburgh, Pennsylvania
7:00 PM	Moloto (yellow card) 55'; Russell (yellow card) 60' (yellow-red card) 69'	Report	Purcell 10'; Hunter (yellow card) 30'; Nealis (yellow card) 45'; McGuigan (yellow card) 49'; Kavanagh 76'	Stadium: Highmark Stadium

=== United Soccer League ===
All times in regular season on Eastern Daylight Time (UTC-04:00)

==== Standings ====
Pos	Team	Pld	W	D	L	GF	GA	GD	Pts
10	Harrisburg City Islanders	30	8	7	15	37	54	−17	31
11	Bethlehem Steel FC	30	6	10	14	32	43	−11	28
12	Toronto FC II	30	7	5	18	36	58	−22	26
13	Pittsburgh Riverhounds	30	6	7	17	31	50	−19	25
14	FC Montreal	30	7	2	21	35	57	−22	23

Source: 2016 USL Standings
Rules for classification: 1) total wins; 2) total goal differential; 3) total goals scored; 4) points earned against top four Conference finishers; 5) disciplinary points; 6) coin toss or drawing of lots

==== Results ====
All times in Eastern Time.

April 2, 2016 1	Pittsburgh Riverhounds	0–1	Rochester Rhinos	Pittsburgh, Pennsylvania
7:00pm		Report	Volesky 7'; Apostolopoulos (yellow card) 62'; Ugarte (yellow card) 64'; Totsch (yellow card) 85'	Stadium: Highmark Stadium; Attendance: 1,106; Referee: Leland Grant

April 17, 2016 2	Toronto FC II	2–2	Pittsburgh Riverhounds	Vaughan, Ontario
4:00pm	Hagglund 12'; Edwards 56' (pen.), (yellow card) 84'; Boskovic (yellow card) 90+1'	Report	Parkes 41'; Swanson (yellow card) 75'; Branson 90+2'	Stadium: Ontario Soccer Centre

April 22, 2016 3	Pittsburgh Riverhounds	1–2	Orlando City B	Pittsburgh, Pennsylvania
7:00pm	Kerr (red card) 36'; Parkes 90+2' (pen.)	Report	Heath (yellow card) 7'; Turner 39', 67'	Stadium: Highmark Stadium; Attendance: 1,711

April 27, 2016 4	Louisville City FC	2–2	Pittsburgh Riverhounds	Louisville, Kentucky
7:30pm	Hoffman 55'; Newnam (yellow card) 73'; Goodwin (red card) 73'; Shanosky 86'	http://www.uslsoccer.com/game/show/13218155?subseason=280291&referrer=2356900 Report	Parkes 9'; Branson (yellow card) 23'; Hertzog 74' (pen.); Murrell (yellow card) 83'	Stadium: Louisville Slugger Field; Attendance: 5,751; Referee: Marcos Deoliveira

April 30, 2016 5	Charleston Battery	1–1	Pittsburgh Riverhounds	Charleston, South Carolina
7:30pm	Portillo 66' (pen.)	Report	Parkes 30'; Gilstrap (yellow card) 38'	Stadium: MUSC Health Stadium

May 7, 2016 6	Pittsburgh Riverhounds	1–3	New York Red Bulls II	Pittsburgh, Pennsylvania
7:00pm	Parkes 10' (red card) 85'; Moloto (yellow card) 21'	Report	Abang 12'; Bonomo 72'; Etienne 82'; Ouimette (red card) 85'; Adams (yellow card) 83'	Stadium: Highmark Stadium; Attendance: 2,370; Referee: Marco Vega

May 14, 2016 7	FC Cincinnati	1–0	Pittsburgh Riverhounds	Cincinnati, Ohio
4:00pm	McLaughlin 26'; Okoli (yellow card) 69'	Report	Moloto (yellow card) 40'; Okai (yellow card) 53'; Campbell (yellow card) 74'	Stadium: Nippert Stadium; Attendance: 23,375; Referee: Brandon Artis

May 21, 2016 8	Pittsburgh Riverhounds	2–1	Toronto FC II	Pittsburgh, Pennsylvania
7:00pm	Murrell (yellow card) 56'; Moloto 68'; Hertzog 72'	Report	Johnson 83'	Stadium: Highmark Stadium; Attendance: 1,209; Referee: Patrick Rosas

May 28, 2016 9	New York Red Bulls II	1–0	Pittsburgh Riverhounds	Harrison, New Jersey
10:00pm	Flemmings 8'; Metzger (yellow card) 58'	Report	Moloto (yellow card) 16'; Okai (yellow card) 16'	Stadium: Red Bull Arena

June 4, 2016 10	Pittsburgh Riverhounds	1–2	Charleston Battery	Pittsburgh, Pennsylvania
7:00pm	Vincent 50'; Campbell (red card) 90+4'	Report	Woodbine 37' (pen.); Mueller 42'; Tsonis (yellow card) 66'; Garbonzo (yellow card) 68'	Stadium: Highmark Stadium; Attendance: 2,905

June 11, 2016 11	Richmond Kickers	3–1	Pittsburgh Riverhounds	Richmond, Virginia
5:00pm	Murrell 17' (o.g.); Gilstrap 20' (o.g.); Grant 67'	Report	Hertzog 90'	Stadium: City Stadium; Attendance: 4,017; Referee: Jaime Herrera

June 18, 2016 12	Pittsburgh Riverhounds	2–1	FC Montreal	Pittsburgh, Pennsylvania
7:00pm	Kerr 17'; Hertzog 27'; Moloto (yellow card) 54'; Thompson (yellow card) 72'	Report	Jackson-Hamel 26'; Gagnon-Laparé (yellow card) 78'	Stadium: Highmark Stadium; Attendance: 2,031; Referee: Elvis Mahmutovic

June 25, 2016 13	Rochester Rhinos	2–1	Pittsburgh Riverhounds	Rochester, New York
6:00pm	Farrell 8'; Garzi 60'	Report	Hertzog 45'	Stadium: Rochester Rhinos Stadium; Attendance: 3,543

July 4, 2016 14	Pittsburgh Riverhounds	0–0	Harrisburg City Islanders	Pittsburgh, Pennsylvania
7:00pm	Green (yellow card) 14'; Ewart (yellow card) 81'; Campbell (yellow card) 90+1'	Report	Warshaw (yellow card) 45+1'; Leverock (yellow card) 52' (yellow-red card) 84'	Stadium: Highmark Stadium

July 10, 2016 15	Bethlehem Steel FC	2–0	Pittsburgh Riverhounds	Bethlehem, Pennsylvania
4:00pm	Burke 24'; Jones (yellow card) 70'; Washington (yellow card) 85'; Gissie (yellow card) 87'; Fernandes 90+2' (pen.)	Report	Adeleye (yellow card) 59'; Branson (yellow card) 85'	Stadium: Goodman Stadium; Attendance: 3,664; Referee: Matthew Kreitzer

July 14, 2016 16	Pittsburgh Riverhounds	0–2	Richmond Kickers	Pittsburgh, Pennsylvania
7:00pm	Earls (yellow card) 16'; Campbell (yellow card) 44'	Report	Imura 44'; Jane (yellow card) 26' (goal) 67'	Stadium: Highmark Stadium; Attendance: 1,844

July 17, 2016 17	Pittsburgh Riverhounds	1–2	Harrisburg City Islanders	Pittsburgh, Pennsylvania
7:00pm	Kerr 60' (yellow card) 63'; Branson (yellow card) 79'	Report	Leverock 28'; Barril 32'; Benbow (yellow card) 80'	Stadium: Highmark Stadium; Attendance: 1,450

July 23, 2016 18	Pittsburgh Riverhounds	0–3	Charlotte Independence	Pittsburgh, Pennsylvania
7:00pm	Earls (yellow card) 1'; Campbell (yellow card) 63'	Report	Calvert 31'; Hilton 44'; Herrera 90+4'	Stadium: Highmark Stadium; Attendance: 1,500; Referee: Greg Dopka

July 30, 2016 19	Wilmington Hammerheads FC	1–4	Pittsburgh Riverhounds	Wilmington, North Carolina
7:00pm	Binns (yellow card) 39'; Lynch 62'; Lawal (red card)	Report; Box Score	Kerr 45'; Hertzog 45+2'; Okai 70'; Thompson 90+3'	Stadium: Legion Stadium

August 5, 2016 20	Pittsburgh Riverhounds	1–2	Louisville City FC	Pittsburgh, Pennsylvania
7:00pm	Hertzog 27'; Green (red card); Moloto (yellow card) 80'	Report; Box Score	Quinn (yellow card) 21'; Davis 56', 82' (yellow card) 84'; Reynolds (yellow card) 75'	Stadium: Highmark Stadium

August 10, 2016 21	FC Montreal	4–1	Pittsburgh Riverhounds	Montreal, Quebec
7:00pm	Riggi 1'; Tabla 11'; Jackson-Hamel 26'; Dominguez (yellow card) 38'; Mkungilwa (yellow card) 42'	Report; Box Score	Hertzog 41'; Campbell (yellow card) 74'; Barson (red card)	Stadium: Complexe sportif Claude-Robillard

August 13, 2016 22	Pittsburgh Riverhounds	2–1	Bethlehem Steel FC	Pittsburgh, Pennsylvania
7:00pm	Hertzog 18' (yellow card) 90+'; Earls (yellow card) 23'; Kerr 62'	Report; Box Score	Cory Burke 28'; Richter (yellow card) 37'; Chambers (yellow card) 66'; Anderson (yellow card) 90+'	Stadium: Highmark Stadium

August 20, 2016 23	Rochester Rhinos	3–0	Pittsburgh Riverhounds	Rochester, New York
6:00pm	Tergou 8', 40'; Reilly 57'	Report; Box Score		Stadium: Rochester Rhinos Stadium

August 24, 2016 24	Pittsburgh Riverhounds	4–1	Wilmington Hammerheads FC	Pittsburgh, Pennsylvania
7:00pm	Hertzog 6', 90+' (pen.); Hunt 40'; Thompson 44'	Report; Box Score	Fairclough 72'; Taublieb (yellow card) 90+'	Stadium: Highmark Stadium

August 27, 2016 25	Harrisburg City Islanders	1–1	Pittsburgh Riverhounds	Harrisburg, Pennsylvania
7:00pm	Foster 65'; Doyle (yellow card) 80'	Report; Box Score	Campbell 70'; Earls (red card); Walsh (yellow card) 85'	Stadium: FNB Field

September 3, 2016 26	Orlando City B	0–2	Pittsburgh Riverhounds	Melbourne, Florida
7:30pm	Ribeiro (yellow card) 16'; Heath (yellow card) 45'; McFadden (yellow card) 74'	Report; Box Score	Walsh 23'; Adeleye (yellow card) 81'; Hertzog 90+' (pen.)	Stadium: Titan Soccer Complex

September 10, 2016 27	Charlotte Independence	4–0	Pittsburgh Riverhounds	Charlotte, North Carolina
7:00pm	Brown 37'; Estrada 45', 54' (yellow card) 90'; Herrera 90+1'	Report; Box Score	Boggs (yellow card) 47'	Stadium: Ramblewood Soccer Complex

September 14, 2016 28	Pittsburgh Riverhounds	0–0	FC Cincinnati	Pittsburgh, Pennsylvania
7:00pm	Martínez (yellow card) 45+1'	Report; Box Score	Walker (yellow card) 60'; Polak (yellow card) 86'	Stadium: Highmark Stadium

September 18, 2016 29	Bethlehem Steel FC	1–1	Pittsburgh Riverhounds	Bethlehem, Pennsylvania
3:00pm	Chambers 68'	Report; Box Score	Hertzog 9' (pen.)	Stadium: Goodman Stadium

September 24, 2016 30	Pittsburgh Riverhounds	0–1	FC Cincinnati	Pittsburgh, Pennsylvania
7:00pm	Hertzog (yellow card) 36'	Report; Box Score	Okoli 31' (pen.); Polak (yellow card) 73'	Stadium: Highmark Stadium

Schedule source

== 2016 roster ==
Note: Flags indicate national team as defined under FIFA eligibility rules; some limited exceptions apply. Players may hold more than one non-FIFA nationality. Squad correct as of February 23, 2016.

No.	Pos.	Nation	Player
1	GK	USA	Hunter Gilstrap
2	DF	USA	Caleb Postlewait
3	DF	USA	Karsten Smith
4	DF	CAN	Jordan Murrell
5	DF	IRL	Danny Earls
6	MF	ENG	Conor Branson
7	MF	GHA	Stephen Okai
8	FW	USA	Michael Green
9	FW	USA	Zak Boggs
10	MF	SCO	Kevin Kerr
11	FW	USA	Corey Hertzog
12	DF	JAM	Sergio Campbell
13	DF	USA	Willie Hunt
14	MF	TOG	Alex Harlley
15	FW	USA	Ryan Dodson
16	DF	USA	Isaiah Schafer
17	DF	USA	Drew Russell
18	GK	CRC	Mauricio Vargas
20	FW	CAN	Duwayne Ewart
21	FW	GHA	James Bissue
22	MF	RSA	Lebo Moloto
23	MF	USA	Nick Kolarac
24	GK	USA	Brenden Alfery
25	MF	USA	Marshall Hollingsworth (on loan from Columbus Crew SC)
26	MF	USA	Ben Swanson (on loan from Columbus Crew SC)
28	MF	USA	Jack Thompson
31	MF	USA	Nick Thompson
33	DF	USA	Ryan Adeleye
34	MF	PAN	Cristian Martínez (on loan from Columbus Crew SC)
35	MF	GUA	Rodrigo Saravia (on loan from Columbus Crew SC)
36	FW	JAM	Chevaughn Walsh
37	FW	CRC	Alejandro Aguilar

== Transfers ==
=== In ===
Date	Name	Last Club	Mode of Transfer	Reference
January 5, 2016	(Togo) Alex Harlley	(United States) Atlanta Silverbacks	Free	
January 5, 2016	(Costa Rica) Mauricio Vargas	(United States) FC Wichita	Free	
January 6, 2016	(United States) Zak Boggs	(United States) Tampa Bay Rowdies	Free	
January 6, 2016	(United States) Corey Hertzog	(United States) Tampa Bay Rowdies	Free	
January 7, 2016	(United States) Hunter Gilstrap	(United States) Carolina RailHawks	Free	
January 7, 2016	(United States) Karsten Smith	(United States) Fort Lauderdale Strikers	Free	
February 11, 2016	(Ghana) James Bissue	(Canada) Montreal Impact	Free	
February 11, 2016	(United States) Ryan Dodson	(Sweden) IFK Stockaryd/Rörviks IF	Free	
February 12, 2016	(United States) Willie Hunt	(United States) Tampa Bay Rowdies	Free	
February 11, 2016	(United States) Isaiah Schafer	(Finland) VPS	Free	
February 18, 2016	(Jamaica) Romeo Parkes	(El Salvador) A.D. Isidro Metapán	Free	
February 22, 2016	(United States) Brenden Alfery	(United States) Robert Morris Colonials	Free	
February 22, 2016	(Jamaica) Sergio Campbell	(United States) Columbus Crew SC	Free	
March 2, 2016	(United States) Brenden Alfery	(United States) Robert Morris Colonials	Free	
March 4, 2016	(United States) Caleb Postlewait	(United States) Butler Bulldogs	Free	
March 17, 2016	(United States) Marshall Hollingsworth	(United States) Columbus Crew SC	Loan	
March 17, 2016	(United States) Ben Swanson	(United States) Columbus Crew SC	Loan	

=== Out ===
Date	Name	Last Club	Mode of Transfer	Reference
October 7, 2015	(United States) Willie Hunt	(United States) Tampa Bay Rowdies	Free	
October 31, 2015	(United States) Calle Brown	(United States) Houston Dynamo	Free	
November 11, 2015	(Jamaica) Ryan Thompson	(United States) Saint Louis FC	Free	
January 5, 2016	(Brazil) Vini Dantas	(United States) Baltimore Blast	Free	
January 18, 2016	(Serbia) Boris Zivanovic	(Slovenia) FC Koper	Free	
January 19, 2016	(United States) Ben Newnam	(United States) Louisville City FC	Free	
February 10, 2016	(United States) Fejiro Okiomah	(United States) San Antonio FC	Free	
February 17, 2016	(England) Rob Vincent	(United States) D.C. United	Undisclosed	
February 24, 2016	(United States) Sterling Flunder	Retired		
March 2, 2016	(Canada) Tyler Pasher	(United States) Swope Park Rangers	Free	
May 9, 2016	(Jamaica) Romeo Parkes	(El Salvador) Isidro Metapán	Waived	
