= Ben Swanson =

American professional soccer player (born 1997)

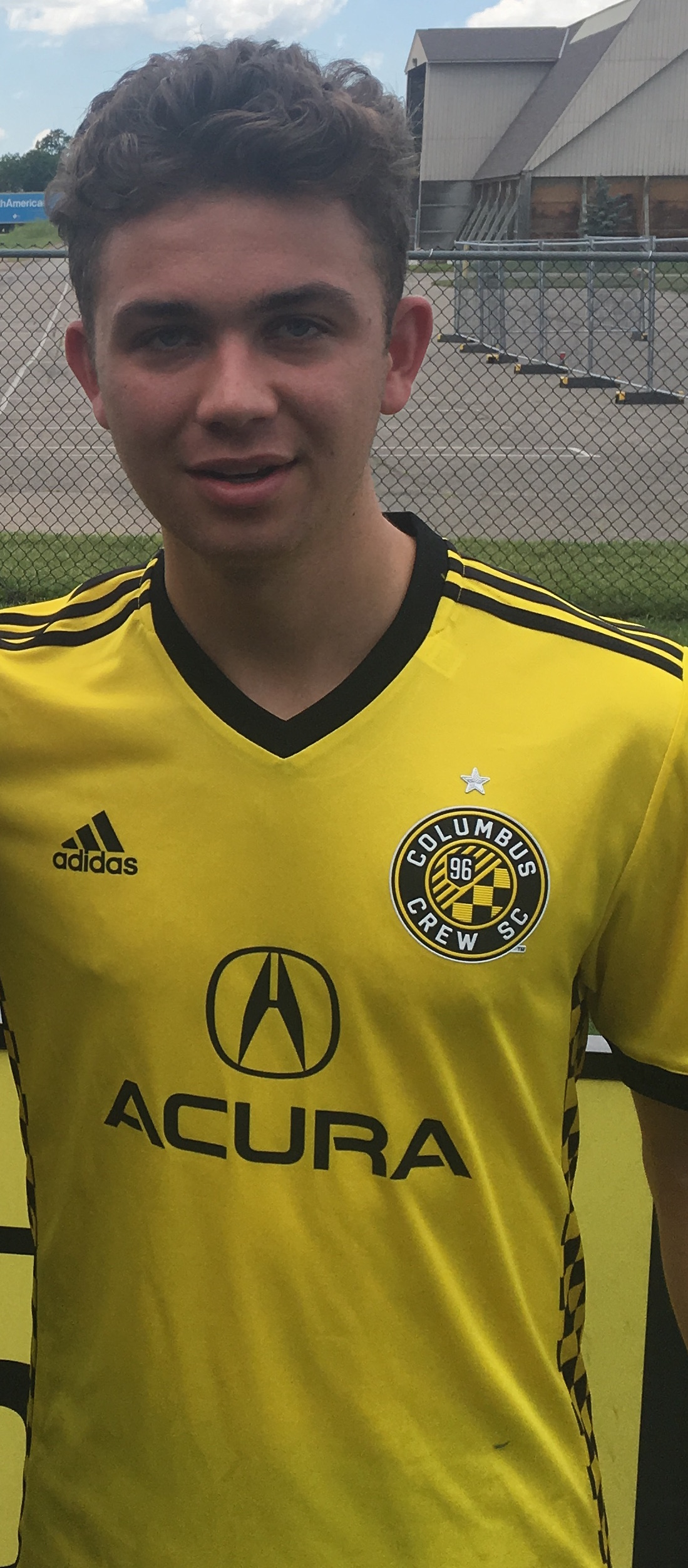
- Swanson at a Columbus Crew SC Meet the Team event in 2017

Personal information
- Date of birth: July 18, 1997 (age 29)
- Place of birth: Grove City, Ohio, United States
- Height: 5 ft 6 in (1.68 m)
- Position: Midfielder

Youth career
- 2010–2014: Columbus Crew SC

Senior career*
Years	Team	Apps	(Gls)
2015–2017	Columbus Crew SC	1	(0)
2016–2017	→ Pittsburgh Riverhounds (loan)	8	(0)

International career^{‡}
2013–2015	United States U18	15	(0)
2015	United States U20	2	(0)
- * Club domestic league appearances and goals as of April 20, 2017 ‡ National team caps and goals as of September 4, 2015

Ben Swanson (born July 18, 1997) is an American former professional soccer player who played as a midfielder.

== Youth ==
Born in Grove City, Ohio, Swanson graduated from Grove City High School. He joined the youth teams of Columbus Crew SC in 2006, moving to the Crew Soccer Academy in 2010. In 2012, Swanson was invited to U.S. Soccer's Residency Program in Bradenton, Florida. He had earned the invitation after being discovered while playing with Crew Academy teams in the U.S. Soccer Development Academy. Swanson began practicing with the senior team in September 2014, and at the time of signing his first professional contract was the longest-tenured Crew Youth player in organization history.

== Club career ==
=== Columbus Crew SC ===
On October 17, 2014, MLS club Columbus Crew SC announced that Swanson would sign a Homegrown Player contract with the club and would be formally added to the roster on January 1, 2015. He became the ninth, and youngest, Homegrown Player in club history once his contract became official.

Swanson made his Columbus debut on May 27, 2015, in a 1–0 friendly defeat against Valencia CF. Although just a friendly, it marked the first professional match of Swanson's career. Later in the season, he was chosen to take part in the 2015 MLS Homegrown Game alongside fellow Crew SC HGP Matt Lampson. Swanson replaced Dillon Serna at halftime against Club América U20s, tallying a shot as the MLS players were defeated 1–1, 5–4 on penalties. He did not appear in any other match for Crew SC on the season, but was sent to Germany late in the year to train with the reserve and youth teams of multiple clubs to help gain experience. Swanson finished his first professional season without having appeared in an official game for Crew SC.

Although Swanson was sent on loan to begin the 2016 season, he was recalled midway through the year by Crew SC, with the club battling injuries and international call-ups. The attrition allowed Swanson to make his club and MLS debut on June 1, replacing Mohammed Saeid in the 74th minute against Philadelphia Union. He completed eight passes in the short time he was on the field, but could not prevent a 3–2 defeat for Crew SC. It would mark Swanson's only appearance on the season for Columbus, as he was recalled from loan and placed on the Season-Ending Injury List in July after undergoing surgery on his right shoulder.

Swanson was again sent on loan to Pittsburgh to begin the 2017 season, but again suffered an injury that ruled him out for the season. He was recalled and placed on the Season-Ending Injury List on April 20 after undergoing surgery on his right ankle. He was expected to miss five to seven months after the surgery.

On December 1, 2017, Crew SC declined Swanson's contract option, ending his 12-year affiliation with the club. Swanson was a part of the first team in Columbus for three seasons, but made just one appearance across all competitions for the club.

==== Loan to Pittsburgh Riverhounds ====
On March 17, 2016, Swanson was loaned to Pittsburgh Riverhounds, Columbus' affiliate club in the USL. He made his Riverhounds and professional debut on April 17 in a home match against Toronto FC II. Swanson came on as a substitute in the 42nd minute to replace Nick Kolarac, receiving a yellow card in the 75th minute of a 2–2 draw. Two weeks later, Swanson earned his first career start, coming away to Charleston Battery on April 30. He lasted 64 minutes before being replaced by Corey Hertzog in a 1–1 draw. Swanson also appeared as a substitute on May 7 in a 3–1 defeat against New York Red Bulls II before being recalled by Columbus. After returning to Pittsburgh in June, he made two more appearances as a substitute, both times replacing Lebogang Moloto. However, Swanson was forced to undergo shoulder surgery in late July, ruling him out for the season. He ended the season having made five appearances over two stints with the Riverhounds.

On March 4, 2017, the Riverhounds announced that Swanson would be returning to the club on loan for a second consecutive season. He made his season debut on March 25 in the season opener against New York Red Bulls II, replacing fellow Crew SC loanee Marshall Hollingsworth in the 62nd minute of the 3–3 draw. A week later, Swanson started for the first time on the season against FC Cincinnati, but was replaced by Michael Green in the 63rd minute of an eventual 1–0 defeat for the Riverhounds. Swanson also started in the third match of the season for Pittsburgh, away to Charleston Battery on April 8, but was forced off injured in the 13th minute after a hard foul by Romario Williams. Swanson suffered an ankle injury that required surgery, prematurely ending his season for a second year in a row. He finished the season with just three appearances for Pittsburgh.

== International career ==
Swanson has been called up at U18 and U20 level by the United States. He was called up to the U18s for the first time in September 2013, as part of a 36-player training camp in Carson, California. Swanson made his first appearances for the U18s in 2014, taking part in the Lisbon International Tournament, International Tournament of Václav Ježek, a December training camp in Marbella, Spain, and captaining the side in a friendly against Canada in April. He continued to be called up by the U18s in 2015, earning an invite to the first camp of the year in Bosnia and Herzegovina in April, as well as the NTC Invitational Tournament in July. Swanson earned 15 caps for the U18s while eligible to play for the team.

Swanson earned his first call-up to the U20s in August 2015, as he was selected to take part in the Stevan Vilotić-Cele Tournament. He started on his U20 debut, going 63 minutes in a 3–1 defeat to Serbia before being replaced by future club teammate Abuchi Obinwa. Swanson also appeared the next day against France, replacing James Murphy in the 74th minute of a 6–1 defeat for the US. Those caps were the only two appearances Swanson made for the U20s.

== Career statistics ==
As of April 20, 2017.

Club	Season	League			Playoffs		Cup		Continental		Total	
Club	Season	Division	Apps	Goals	Apps	Goals	Apps	Goals	Apps	Goals	Apps	Goals
Columbus Crew SC	2015	MLS	0	0	0	0	0	0	–		0	0
Columbus Crew SC	2016	MLS	1	0	–		0	0	–		1	0
Columbus Crew SC	2017	MLS	0	0	0	0	0	0	–		0	0
Columbus Crew SC	Total		1	0	0	0	0	0	0	0	1	0
Pittsburgh Riverhounds (loan)	2016	USL	5	0	–		0	0	–		5	0
Pittsburgh Riverhounds (loan)	2017	USL	3	0	–		0	0	–		3	0
Pittsburgh Riverhounds (loan)	Total		8	0	0	0	0	0	0	0	8	0
Career total			9	0	0	0	0	0	0	0	9	0
