= 2016 Columbus Crew SC season =

Columbus Crew SC
2016 season
- Investor-operators: Anthony Precourt
- Head Coach: Gregg Berhalter
- Stadium: MAPFRE Stadium
- Major League Soccer: Conference: 9th Overall: 18th
- MLS Cup playoffs: Did not qualify
- U.S. Open Cup: Round of 16
- Top goalscorer: League: Ola Kamara (16); All: Ola Kamara (16)
- Highest home attendance: 20,389(6/25 v. NYRB)
- Lowest home attendance: 1,064 (6/15 v TAM)
- Average home league attendance: 17,125 (85.8%)
- Biggest win: CLB 4–0 TAM (6/15)
- Biggest defeat: TOR 3-0 CLB (7/31); DC 3-0 CLB (9/28); NYC 4-1 CLB (10/23)
Home colors	Away colors

The 2016 Columbus Crew SC season was the club's 21st season of existence and their 21st consecutive season in Major League Soccer, the top flight of soccer in the United States and Canada. The first match of the season was on March 6 against Portland Timbers. It was the third season under head coach Gregg Berhalter. The Crew's USL Pro affiliate this season was Pittsburgh Riverhounds.

== Roster ==
As of November 20, 2016

Note: Flags indicate national team as defined under FIFA eligibility rules; some limited exceptions apply. Players may hold more than one non-FIFA nationality.

No.	Pos.	Nation	Player
1	GK	USA	Steve Clark
2	DF	USA	Tyson Wahl
3	DF	USA	Corey Ashe
4	DF	USA	Michael Parkhurst (Captain)
5	MF	USA	Dilly Duka
6	MF	CMR	Tony Tchani
8	MF	ERI	Mohammed Saeid (INT)
9	FW	IRQ	Justin Meram
10	FW	ARG	Federico Higuaín (DP)
11	MF	COD	Cedrick Mabwati (INT)
12	FW	USA	Adam Jahn
13	MF	USA	Ethan Finlay
14	DF	CRC	Waylon Francis
16	MF	USA	Hector Jiménez
17	FW	NOR	Ola Kamara (INT)

No.	Pos.	Nation	Player
18	MF	PAN	Cristian Martínez (INT; SUP)
19	MF	GUA	Rodrigo Saravia (INT; SUP)
20	MF	USA	Wil Trapp (HGP)
21	DF	USA	Chad Barson (HGP; SUP)
22	DF	ARG	Gastón Sauro (INT)
23	GK	USA	Zack Steffen (SUP)
24	MF	NOR	Nicolai Næss (INT)
25	DF	GHA	Harrison Afful (INT)
26	MF	USA	Ben Swanson (HGP; SUP)
27	FW	USA	Conor Casey
29	MF	USA	Marshall Hollingsworth (SUP)
30	GK	USA	Matt Pacifici (SUP)
41	GK	USA	Brad Stuver (SUP)

== Technical Staff ==
Position	Staff
President, Precourt Sports Ventures	(United States) Dave Greeley
President of Business Operations	(United States) Andy Loughnane
Director of Soccer Operations	(United States) Asher Mendelsohn
Sporting Director/Head Coach	(United States) Gregg Berhalter
Assistant Coach	(Finland) Sixten Boström
Assistant Coach	(Canada) Pat Onstad
Assistant Coach	(United States) Josh Wolff
High Performance Director	(United States) Steve Tashjian
Strength/Conditioning Coach	(United States) Brook Hamilton
Director of Team Operations	(United States) Zach Crusse
Head Equipment Manager	(United States) David Brauzer
Team Operations Assistant	(United States) Ron Meadors
Head Athletic Trainer	(United States) Craig Devine
Assistant Trainer	(United States) Jon MacGregor
Performance Analyst	(Germany) Adin Osmanbasic
Team Coordinator	(United States) Julio Velasquez

Source: []

== Non-competitive ==
=== Preseason ===
The Crew started preseason in Columbus and traveled to Florida for a two week camp. They then played games in Arizona as part of the 2016 Desert Diamond Cup before returning to Ohio. The Crew brought in the following trialists during training camp: Matt Pacifici.

Unsigned draft picks Rodrigo Saravia, Chase Minter, Kyle Parker, Marshall Hollingsworth and Vince Cicciarelli also joined the team for preseason.

February 17 Desert Diamond Cup Group Stage	Sporting Kansas City	2–2	Columbus Crew SC	Tucson, AZ
8:00 PM EST	Quintillà (yellow card) 40'; Mustivar 52'; Hajderovic 88'	Report	Kamara 46', 74'	Stadium: Kino North Grandstand; Referee: Alex Chilowicz

February 20 Desert Diamond Cup Group Stage	Real Salt Lake	1–1	Columbus Crew SC	Tucson, AZ
7:00 PM EST	Allen 17'; Wingert (yellow card) 25'; García (yellow card) 51'	Report	Kamara 26'	Stadium: Kino North Stadium; Referee: Edvin Jurisevic; Assistant referees: Anthony Vasoli; Noah Kenyawani

February 24 Desert Diamond Cup Group Stage	Columbus Crew SC	2–2	Swope Park Rangers	Tucson, AZ
8:00 PM EST	Higuaín 35'; Barson (yellow card) 58'; Finlay 66'; Wahl (yellow card) 73'	Report	Granitto 38'; Ballo 90'	Stadium: Kino North Grandstand

February 27 Desert Diamond Cup Championship Game	New England Revolution	0–1	Columbus Crew SC	Tucson, AZ
7:00 PM EST	Bunbury 21'	Report		Stadium: Kino North Stadium

=== Midseason ===
April 24 Friendly	Columbus Crew SC	4–2	Akron Zips	Columbus, OH
	40'; 50'; 65'; 78'	Report	Kahsay 33'; Harter 47'	Stadium: MAPFRE Stadium

May 11 Friendly	Columbus Crew SC	1–0	Tiburones Rojos de Veracruz	Columbus, OH
7:30 PM EDT	Kamara 17'	Report		Stadium: MAPFRE Stadium; Attendance: 10,799

== Competitive ==
=== Overview ===
Competition	First match	Last match	Starting round	Final position	Record							
Competition	First match	Last match	Starting round	Final position	Pld	W	D	L	GF	GA	GD	Win %
Major League Soccer	March 6, 2016	October 23, 2016	Matchday 1	18th	34	8	12	14	50	58	−8	23.53
U.S. Open Cup	June 15, 2016	June 28, 2016	Fourth Round	Round of 16	2	1	0	1	5	2	+3	50.00
Total					36	9	12	15	55	60	−5	25.00

Source: Competitions

=== MLS ===
==== Standings ====
===== Eastern Conference =====
Pos	Team	Pld	W	L	T	GF	GA	GD	Pts	Qualification
6	Philadelphia Union	34	11	14	9	52	55	−3	42	Qualification for the knockout round
7	New England Revolution	34	11	14	9	44	54	−10	42	
8	Orlando City SC	34	9	11	14	55	60	−5	41	
9	Columbus Crew SC	34	8	14	12	50	58	−8	36	
10	Chicago Fire	34	7	17	10	42	58	−16	31	

Source: MLS

===== Overall table =====
Pos	Team	Pld	W	L	T	GF	GA	GD	Pts
16	Vancouver Whitecaps FC	34	10	15	9	45	52	−7	39
17	San Jose Earthquakes	34	8	12	14	32	40	−8	38
18	Columbus Crew SC	34	8	14	12	50	58	−8	36
19	Houston Dynamo	34	7	14	13	39	45	−6	34
20	Chicago Fire	34	7	17	10	42	58	−16	31

Source: MLS
Rules for classification: 1) points; 2) total wins; 3) total goal differential; 4) total goals scored;

==== Results summary ====
Overall								Home						Away					
Pld	Pts	W	L	T	GF	GA	GD	W	L	T	GF	GA	GD	W	L	T	GF	GA	GD
34	36	8	14	12	50	58	−8	6	3	8	31	25	+6	2	11	4	19	33	−14

Source: MLS standings
Pld = Matches played; Pts = Points; W = Matches won; T = Matches tied; L = Matches lost; GF = Goals for; GA = Goals against; GD = Goal difference

==== Results by round ====
Round	1	2	3	4	5	6	7	8	9	10	11	12	13	14	15	16	17	18	19	20	21	22	23	24	25	26	27	28	29	30	31	32	33	34
Stadium	A	H	A	A	A	H	H	A	H	H	A	H	A	H	H	A	A	H	H	H	A	H	A	H	H	A	H	A	H	A	H	A	A	A
Result	L	L	D	D	L	W	W	L	D	D	D	W	L	D	D	L	L	D	D	D	L	D	W	L	W	L	L	W	W	L	W	D	L	L

Source: Columbus schedule
A = Away; H = Home; W = Win; D = Draw; L = Loss

==== Match results ====
March 6 1	Portland Timbers	2–1	Columbus Crew SC	Portland, OR
4:30 PM EST	Valeri 23'; Taylor (yellow card) 46'; Adi 79', (yellow card) 87'; Powell (yellow card) 81'	Report	Sauro (yellow card) 25'; Trapp (yellow card) 45'; Higuaín 68'	Stadium: Providence Park; Attendance: 21,144; Referee: Baldomero Toledo; Assistant referees: Adam Garner; Mike Kampmeinert; Fourth official: Juan Guzman

March 12 2	Columbus Crew SC	1–2	Philadelphia Union	Columbus, OH
7:30 PM EST	Kamara 87'	Report	Pontius 45+1', 71'; Fabinho (yellow card) 56'; Carroll (yellow card) 65'	Stadium: MAPFRE Stadium; Attendance: 17,015; Referee: Hilario Grajeda; Assistant referees: James Conlee; Jason White; Fourth official: Geoff Gamble

March 19 3	Chicago Fire	0–0	Columbus Crew SC	Bridgeview, IL
5:00 PM EDT		Report	Meram (yellow card) 38'	Stadium: Toyota Park; Attendance: 12,605; Referee: Robert Sibiga; Assistant referees: Craig Lowry; Anthony Vasoli; Fourth official: Jorge Gonzalez

April 2 4	FC Dallas	1–1	Columbus Crew SC	Dallas, TX
9:00 PM EDT	Akindele 77'; Gruezo (yellow card) 78'; Loyd (yellow card) 80'	Report	Meram 9'	Stadium: Toyota Stadium; Attendance: 13,174; Referee: Edvin Jurisevic; Assistant referees: Frank Anderson; Jeffrey Greeson; Fourth official: Juan Guzman

April 9 5	Montreal Impact	2–0	Columbus Crew SC	Montreal, QC
4:00 PM EDT	Camara 48'; Piatti (yellow card) 53'; Bekker 86', (yellow card) 87'	Report		Stadium: Olympic Stadium; Attendance: 22,053; Referee: Chris Penso; Assistant referees: Adam Wienckowski; Jason White; Fourth official: Mathieu Bourdeau

April 16 6	Columbus Crew SC	3–2	New York City FC	Columbus, OH
7:30 PM EDT	Finlay 7'; Trapp (yellow card) 43'; Kamara 49'; Meram 80'; Parkhurst (red card) 86'	Report	Villa 15', 87'; Hernandez (yellow card) 27'; Mullins (yellow card) 82'; Iraola (yellow card) 84'	Stadium: MAPFRE Stadium; Attendance: 16,715; Referee: Ted Unkel; Assistant referees: Peter Manikowski; Gianni Facchini; Fourth official: Jorge Gonzalez

April 23 7	Columbus Crew SC	1–0	Houston Dynamo	Columbus, OH
7:30 PM EDT	Kamara 21'; Meram (yellow card) 24'; Wahl (yellow card) 27'	Report	Deric (red card) 18'	Stadium: MAPFRE Stadium; Attendance: 17,705; Referee: Kevin Stott; Assistant referees: Eric Boria; Danny Thornberry; Fourth official: Kevin Terry Jr.

April 30 8	Seattle Sounders FC	1–0	Columbus Crew SC	Seattle, WA
4:00 PM EDT	Alonso (yellow card) 27'; Friberg (yellow card) 82'; Morris 88'	Report	Francis (yellow card) 86'; Finlay (yellow card) 87'	Stadium: CenturyLink Field; Attendance: 39,473; Referee: Juan Guzman; Assistant referees: Mike Kampmeinert; Eduardo Mariscal; Fourth official: Baboucarr Jallow

May 7 9	Columbus Crew SC	4–4	Montreal Impact	Columbus, OH
7:30 PM EDT	Kamara 16', 45+1'; Higuaín 48', 53' (pen.); Francis (yellow card) 82'	Report	Piatti 26', 58'; Drogba 57' (pen.); Ontivero (yellow card) 82'; Oduro 90+3'	Stadium: MAPFRE Stadium; Attendance: 14,095; Referee: Armando Villarreal; Assistant referees: Adam Garner; Kathryn Nesbitt; Fourth official: Sorin Stoica

May 14 10	Columbus Crew SC	1–1	Colorado Rapids	Columbus, OH
7:30 PM EDT	Cedrick 23'	Report	Doyle (yellow card) 10', (goal) 55'; Gashi (yellow card) 63'	Stadium: MAPFRE Stadium; Attendance: 15,023; Referee: Chris Penso; Assistant referees: Kermit Quisenberry; Jason White; Fourth official: Edvin Jurisevic

May 21 11	Toronto FC	0–0	Columbus Crew SC	Toronto, ON
5:00 PM EDT	Morrow (yellow card) 56'; Beitashour (yellow card) 82'	Report	Trapp (yellow card) 88'	Stadium: BMO Field; Attendance: 26,252; Referee: Nima Saghafi; Assistant referees: Craig Lowry; Anthony Vasoli; Fourth official: Hilario Grajeda

May 28 12	Columbus Crew SC	4–3	Real Salt Lake	Columbus, OH
7:30 PM EDT	Kamara 17', 64', 74'; Glad (o.g.) 20'; Saeid (yellow card) 81'	Report	Mulholland 13'; Maund (yellow card) 41'; Allen 78'; Plata 83'	Stadium: MAPFRE Stadium; Attendance: 14,894; Referee: David Gantar; Assistant referees: Daniel Belleau; Andrew Bigelow; Fourth official: Tyler Ploeger

June 1 13	Philadelphia Union	3–2	Columbus Crew SC	Philadelphia, PA
7:00 PM EDT	Pontius 21'; Tribbett (yellow card) 32'; Nogueira 57', (yellow card) 69'; Le Toux (yellow card) 64'; Herbers 84'	Report	Kamara 14'; Finlay (yellow card) 43'; Casey (red card) 77'; Martínez 90+3'	Stadium: Talen Energy Stadium; Attendance: 15,543; Referee: Robert Sibiga; Assistant referees: Adam Wienckowski; Kevin Klinger; Fourth official: Alan Kelly

June 18 14	Columbus Crew SC	0–0	Montreal Impact	Columbus, OH
7:30 PM EDT	Ashe (yellow card) 14'; Wahl (yellow card) 68'; Tchani (yellow card) 68'	Report	Drogba (yellow card) 56'; Camara (yellow card) 90+2'	Stadium: MAPFRE Stadium; Attendance: 14,814; Referee: Sorin Stoica; Assistant referees: Claudiu Badea; Peter Balciunas; Fourth official: Hilario Grajeda

June 25 15	Columbus Crew SC	1–1	New York Red Bulls	Columbus, OH
7:30 PM EDT	Tchani (yellow card) 60'; Kamara 90+3'	Report	Lade (yellow card) 32'; Muyl (yellow card) 33'; Kljestan (yellow card) 39'; Wright-Phillips 52'; Robles (yellow card) 85'	Stadium: MAPFRE Stadium; Attendance: 20,389; Referee: Baldomero Toledo; Assistant referees: Eduardo Mariscal; Logan Brown; Fourth official: Kevin Terry Jr.

July 3 16	Sporting Kansas City	3–2	Columbus Crew SC	Kansas City, KS
7:00 PM EDT	Feilhaber (yellow card) 13', (goal) 49' (pen.); Dwyer (yellow card) 51'Zusi 56'; Besler (yellow card) 66', (goal) 90+1'; Medranda (yellow card) 84'	Report	Kamara 22', 75'; Wahl (red card) 48'; Afful (yellow card) 82'	Stadium: Children's Mercy Park; Attendance: 19,332; Referee: Ted Unkel; Assistant referees: Corey Parker; Jeremy Hanson; Fourth official: Alex Chilowicz

July 9 17	New England Revolution	3–1	Columbus Crew SC	Foxborough, MA
7:30 PM EDT	Nguyen 3'; Woodberry (yellow card) 19'; Farrell (yellow card) 30'; Trapp (o.g.) 34'; Knighton (yellow card) 67'; Kamara 71'; Rowe (yellow card) 79'	Report	Tchani (yellow card) 27'; Kamara 42'	Stadium: Gillette Stadium; Attendance: 18,434; Referee: Mark Geiger; Assistant referees: Joe Fletcher; Kathryn Nesbitt; Fourth official: Hilario Grajeda

July 13 18	Columbus Crew SC	1–1	Toronto FC	Columbus, OH
7:30 PM EDT	Afful 54'	Report	Bloom (yellow card) 32'; Hamilton 64'	Stadium: MAPFRE Stadium; Attendance: 13,410; Referee: Robert Sibiga; Assistant referees: Jeff Muschik; James Conlee; Fourth official: Fotis Bazakos

July 16 19	Columbus Crew SC	1–1	D.C. United	Columbus, OH
7:30 PM EDT	Trapp (yellow card) 21'; Kamara 63'; Afful (red card) 74'; Steve Clark (yellow card) 88'	Report	Espindola 89'	Stadium: MAPFRE Stadium; Attendance: 20,065; Referee: Silviu Petrescu; Assistant referees: Oscar Mitchell-Carvalho; Jeffrey Greeson; Fourth official: Daniel Radford

July 23 20	Columbus Crew SC	2–2	Orlando City SC	Columbus, OH
7:30 PM EDT	Tchani 20'; Kamara 45+6' (pen.)	Report	Bendik (yellow card) 45+5'; Molino (yellow card) 45+6'; Boden (yellow card) 62'; Molino 65'; Larin 70'	Stadium: MAPFRE Stadium; Attendance: 20,034; Referee: Drew Fischer; Assistant referees: Jeremy Hanson; Jason White; Fourth official: Nima Saghafi

July 31 21	Toronto FC	3–0	Columbus Crew SC	Toronto, ON
7:30 PM EDT	Endoh 8'; Giovinco 24'; Altidore 87'	Report	Tchani (yellow card) 89'; Parkhurst (yellow card) 90+1'	Stadium: BMO Field; Attendance: 23,979; Referee: Allen Chapman; Assistant referees: Joe Fletcher; Kyle Longville; Fourth official: Geoff Gamble

August 13 22	Columbus Crew SC	3–3	New York City FC	Columbus, OH
7:30 PM EDT	Meram 49'; Finlay 80' (pen.), 90+5'; Tchani (yellow card) 90+1'	Report	Lampard 41'; Villa 83', 90+2' (pen.)	Stadium: MAPFRE Stadium; Attendance: 18,189; Referee: Sorin Stoica; Assistant referees: Sean Hurd; Andrew Bigelow; Fourth official: Silviu Petrescu

August 20 23	New England Revolution	0–2	Columbus Crew SC	Foxborough, MA
7:30 PM EDT	Woodberry (yellow card) 26'; Bunbury (yellow card) 35'; Kamara (yellow card) 86'	Report	Finlay 8'; Higuaín 49'; Saeid (yellow card) 72'	Stadium: Gillette Stadium; Attendance: 20,224; Referee: Edvin Jurisevic; Assistant referees: Gianni Facchini; Brian Dunn; Fourth official: Chris Penso

August 24 24	Columbus Crew SC	1–2	Philadelphia Union	Columbus, OH
7:30 PM EDT	Jahn 73'	Report	Herbers 60'; Rosenberry 74'; Bedoya (yellow card) 78'	Stadium: MAPFRE Stadium; Attendance: 13,114; Referee: Allen Chapman; Assistant referees: Matt Nelson; Andrew Bigelow; Fourth official: Nima Saghafi

August 27 25	Columbus Crew SC	2–0	San Jose Earthquakes	Columbus, OH
7:30 PM EDT	Finlay 32'; Meram 84' (pen.)	Report	Cerén (yellow card) 65'	Stadium: MAPFRE Stadium; Attendance: 20,031; Referee: Ismail Elfath; Assistant referees: Peter Manikowski; Nick Uranga; Fourth official: Jaime Herrera

September 3 26	LA Galaxy	2–1	Columbus Crew SC	Carson, CA
10:30 PM EDT	Husidic 78'; dos Santos 82'	Report	Jahn 90+2'	Stadium: StubHub Center; Attendance: 24,693; Referee: Kevin Stott; Assistant referees: Eduardo Mariscal; Jose Da Silva; Fourth official: Alex Chilowicz

September 10 27	Columbus Crew SC	1–3	Vancouver Whitecaps FC	Columbus, OH
6:00 PM EDT	Kamara 11'; Tchani (red card) 86'	Report	Sauro 13' (o.g.); Techera (yellow card) 19'; Jacobson 74'; Hurtado 82'; Mezquida (yellow card) 85'	Stadium: MAPFRE Stadium; Attendance: 15,589; Referee: Fotis Bazakos; Assistant referees: Gianni Facchini; Brian Poeschel; Fourth official: Mark Kadlecik

September 17 28	Orlando City SC	1–4	Columbus Crew SC	Orlando, FL
7:30 PM EDT	Rivas (yellow card) 49'; García (yellow card) 57'; Ambrose (yellow card) 60'; Larin 79'	Report	Finlay 6'; Hines (o.g.) 22'; Kamara 44', 90+5'; Sauro (yellow card) 62'	Stadium: Orlando Citrus Bowl Stadium; Attendance: 30,218; Referee: Drew Fischer; Assistant referees: Sean Hurd; Danny Thornberry; Fourth official: Ted Unkel

September 25 29	Columbus Crew SC	2–0	New England Revolution	Columbus, OH
7:00 PM EDT	Parkhurst (yellow card) 37'; Kamara 42', 84' (pen.); Tchani (yellow card) 48'; Sauro (yellow card) 64'	Report	Woodberry (yellow card) 83'; Caldwell (yellow card) 90'	Stadium: MAPFRE Stadium; Attendance: 20,012; Referee: Chris Penso; Assistant referees: Eric Boria; Kevin Klinger; Fourth official: Hilario Grajeda

September 28 30	D.C. United	3–0	Columbus Crew SC	Washington, D.C.
7:30 PM EDT	Sam 71'; Neagle 86'; Saborio 90'	Report		Stadium: Robert F. Kennedy Memorial Stadium; Attendance: 12,094; Referee: Silviu Petrescu; Assistant referees: Gianni Facchini; Danny Thornberry; Fourth official: Marcos de Oliveira

October 1 31	Columbus Crew SC	3–0	Chicago Fire	Columbus, OH
7:30 PM EDT	Afful 8'; Meram 50'; Duka 59'	Report	Ramos (yellow card) 88'	Stadium: MAPFRE Stadium; Attendance: 20,034; Referee: Alejandro Mariscal; Assistant referees: C.J. Morgante; Adam Garner; Fourth official: Baldomero Toledo

October 13 32	Chicago Fire	2–2	Columbus Crew SC	Bridgeview, IL
8:30 PM EDT	Parkhurst 53' (o.g.); de Leeuw 57'; Cocis (yellow card) 80': Meira (yellow card) 85'	Report	Jahn 13', 80'	Stadium: Toyota Park; Attendance: 15,883; Referee: David Gantar; Assistant referees: Peter Manikowski; Nick Uranga; Fourth official: Hilario Grajeda

October 16 33	New York Red Bulls	3–2	Columbus Crew SC	Harrison, NJ
5:00 PM EDT	Collin (yellow card) 3'; Grella 53'; Wright-Phillips 58', 70'	Report	Tchani (yellow card) 14'; Trapp (yellow card) 37'; Martínez (yellow card) 40'; Jahn 73'; Afful 83'; Meram (yellow card) 90+4'	Stadium: Red Bull Arena; Attendance: 22,937; Referee: Edvin Jurisevic; Assistant referees: Jonathan Johnson; Danny Thornberry; Fourth official: Nima Saghafi

October 23 34	New York City FC	4–1	Columbus Crew SC	New York, NY
4:00 PM EDT	Chanot (yellow card) 25'; Mendoza 45'; Harrison 75'; Shelton 77'; Villa 90+3'	Report	Kamara 59'; Tchani (yellow card) 79'	Stadium: Yankee Stadium; Attendance: 30,374; Referee: Jose Carlos Rivero; Assistant referees: Corey Parker; Eric Weisbrod; Fourth official: Jorge Gonzalez

=== MLS Cup Playoffs ===
The Columbus Crew failed to qualify for the playoffs in this season.

=== U.S. Open Cup ===
June 15, 2016 Fourth Round	Columbus Crew SC (MLS) (Ohio)	4–0	(Florida) Tampa Bay Rowdies (NASL)	Columbus, OH
7:00 PM EDT	Meram 41'; Martínez 48'; Finlay 52' (pen.); Hollingsworth 65'	Report	King (yellow card) 51'	Stadium: Jesse Owens Memorial Stadium; Attendance: 1,064; Referee: Greg Dopka; Assistant referees: Devon Duling; Andrey Castel; Fourth official: Brandon Artis

June 28, 2016 Round of 16	Chicago Fire (MLS) (Illinois)	2–1	(Ohio) Columbus Crew SC (MLS)	Bridgeview, IL
8:30 PM EDT	Accam 7', 29'; LaBrocca (yellow card) 53'; Ramos (yellow card) 66'	Report	Finlay 79' (pen.); Wahl (yellow card) 90'	Stadium: Toyota Park; Attendance: 6,190; Referee: Nima Saghafi; Assistant referees: Ceri Richards; Art Arustamyan

== Statistics ==
=== Appearances and goals ===
Under "Apps" for each section, the first number represents the number of starts, and the second number represents appearances as a substitute.

No.	Pos	Nat	Player	Total		MLS		U.S. Open Cup	
No.	Pos	Nat	Player	Apps	Goals	Apps	Goals	Apps	Goals
1	GK	(United States) USA	Steve Clark	32	0	32+0	0	0+0	0
2	DF	(United States) USA	Tyson Wahl	14	0	11+2	0	1+0	0
3	DF	(United States) USA	Corey Ashe	19	0	14+4	0	0+1	0
4	DF	(United States) USA	Michael Parkhurst	36	0	34+0	0	2+0	0
5	MF	(United States) USA	Dilly Duka	15	1	5+10	1	0+0	0
6	MF	(Cameroon) CMR	Tony Tchani	23	1	20+1	1	2+0	0
8	MF	(Eritrea) ERI	Mohammed Saeid	25	0	24+1	0	0+0	0
9	FW	(Iraq) IRQ	Justin Meram	35	6	31+2	5	2+0	1
10	FW	(Argentina) ARG	Federico Higuaín	20	4	18+2	4	0+0	0
11	MF	(Democratic Republic of the Congo) COD	Cedrick Mabwati	17	1	6+11	1	0+0	0
12	FW	(United States) USA	Adam Jahn	12	0	4+8	0	0+0	0
13	MF	(United States) USA	Ethan Finlay	35	8	27+7	6	0+1	2
14	DF	(Costa Rica) CRC	Waylon Francis	21	0	13+6	0	2+0	0
16	MF	(United States) USA	Hector Jiménez	27	0	14+11	0	2+0	0
17	FW	(Norway) NOR	Ola Kamara	26	16	20+5	16	1+0	0
18	MF	(Panama) PAN	Cristian Martínez	7	2	2+3	1	2+0	1
19	MF	(Guatemala) GUA	Rodrigo Saravia	12	0	1+9	0	2+0	0
20	MF	(United States) USA	Wil Trapp	31	0	29+1	0	0+1	0
21	DF	(United States) USA	Chad Barson	9	0	3+4	0	2+0	0
22	DF	(Argentina) ARG	Gastón Sauro	13	0	12+1	0	0+0	0
23	GK	(United States) USA	Zack Steffen	0	0	0+0	0	0+0	0
24	MF	(Norway) NOR	Nicolai Næss	13	0	13+0	0	0+0	0
25	DF	(Ghana) GHA	Harrison Afful	30	3	30+0	3	0+0	0
26	DF	(United States) USA	Ben Swanson	1	0	0+1	0	0+0	0
27	FW	(United States) USA	Conor Casey	4	0	0+4	0	0+0	0
29	MF	(United States) USA	Marshall Hollingsworth	1	1	0+0	0	1+0	1
30	GK	(United States) USA	Matt Pacifici	0	0	0+0	0	0+0	0
41	GK	(United States) USA	Brad Stuver	4	0	2+0	0	2+0	0
			Own goal	0	0	-	0	-	0
Players who left Columbus during the season:
7	MF	(Denmark) DEN	Emil Larsen	4	0	0+3	0	1+0	0
23	FW	(Sierra Leone) SLE	Kei Kamara	9	5	9+0	5	0+0	0
33	DF	(Egypt) EGY	Amro Tarek	1	0	0+1	0	0+0	0

=== Disciplinary record ===
No.	Pos.	Name	MLS		U.S. Open Cup		Total	
No.	Pos.	Name	Yellow card	Red card	Yellow card	Red card	Yellow card	Red card
1	GK	(United States) Steve Clark	1	0	0	0	0	0
2	DF	(United States) Tyson Wahl	2	2	1	0	3	2
3	DF	(United States) Corey Ashe	1	0	0	0	1	0
4	DF	(United States) Michael Parkhurst	2	0	0	0	2	0
5	MF	(United States) Dilly Duka	0	0	0	0	0	0
6	MF	(Cameroon) Tony Tchani	8	1	0	0	8	1
8	MF	(Eritrea) Mohammed Saeid	2	0	0	0	2	0
9	FW	(Iraq) Justin Meram	3	0	0	0	3	0
10	FW	(Argentina) Federico Higuaín	0	0	0	0	0	0
11	MF	(Democratic Republic of the Congo) Cedrick Mabwati	0	0	0	0	0	0
12	FW	(United States) Adam Jahn	0	0	0	0	0	0
13	MF	(United States) Ethan Finlay	2	0	0	0	2	0
14	DF	(Costa Rica) Waylon Francis	2	0	0	0	2	0
16	MF	(United States) Hector Jiménez	0	0	0	0	0	0
17	FW	(Norway) Ola Kamara	0	0	0	0	0	0
18	MF	(Panama) Cristian Martínez	1	0	0	0	1	0
19	MF	(Guatemala) Rodrigo Saravia	0	0	0	0	0	0
20	MF	(United States) Wil Trapp	5	0	0	0	5	0
21	DF	(United States) Chad Barson	0	0	0	0	0	0
22	DF	(Argentina) Gastón Sauro	3	0	0	0	3	0
23	GK	(United States) Zack Steffen	0	0	0	0	0	0
24	MF	(Norway) Nicolai Næss	0	0	0	0	0	0
25	DF	(Ghana) Harrison Afful	1	0	0	0	1	0
26	MF	(United States) Ben Swanson	0	0	0	0	0	0
27	FW	(United States) Conor Casey	0	0	0	0	0	0
29	MF	(United States) Marshall Hollingsworth	0	0	0	0	0	0
30	GK	(United States) Matt Pacifici	0	0	0	0	0	0
41	GK	(United States) Brad Stuver	0	0	0	0	0	0
Players who left Columbus during the season:
7	MF	(Denmark) Emil Larsen	0	0	0	0	0	0
23	FW	(Sierra Leone) Kei Kamara	0	0	0	0	0	0
33	DF	(Egypt) Amro Tarek	0	0	0	0	0	0

=== Clean sheets ===
No.	Name	MLS	U.S. Open Cup	Total	Games Played		
No.	Name	1	(United States) Steve Clark	8	0	8	32
23	(United States) Zack Steffen	0	0	0	0		
30	(United States) Matt Pacifici	0	0	0	0		
41	(United States) Brad Stuver	0	1	1	4		

== Transfers ==
=== In ===
Pos.	Player	Transferred from	Fee/notes	Date	Source
MF	(Denmark) Emil Larsen	(Denmark) Odense Boldklub		January 22, 2016	
FW	(United States) Conor Casey	(United States) Philadelphia Union	Signed as a free agent	January 26, 2016	
MF	(Guatemala) Rodrigo Saravia	(United States) Florida Gulf Coast Eagles	Drafted in the first round of the 2016 MLS SuperDraft	February 4, 2016	
FW	(Norway) Ola Kamara	FK Austria Wien	Signed via discovery	February 4, 2016	
MF	(United States) Marshall Hollingsworth	(United States) Wheaton Thunder	Drafted in the second round of the 2016 MLS SuperDraft	March 4, 2016	
GK	(United States) Matt Pacifici	(United States) Davidson Wildcats	Signed as an undrafted free agent	March 4, 2016	
MF	(United States) Dilly Duka	(Canada) Montreal Impact	Traded for general allocation money, targeted allocation money and a second round draft pick in the 2017 MLS SuperDraft	June 20, 2016	
DF	(Norway) Nicolai Næss	(Norway) Stabæk	Signed via discovery	July 21, 2016	
GK	(United States) Zack Steffen	(Germany) SC Freiburg	Signed via discovery	July 22, 2016	
FW	(United States) Adam Jahn	(United States) San Jose Earthquakes	Traded for targeted allocation money	July 30, 2016	
DF	(United States) Alex Crognale	(United States) Maryland Terrapins	Signed to a homegrown contract	December 20, 2016	
DF	(Finland) Jukka Raitala	(Norway) Sogndal Fotball	Signed via discovery	December 23, 2016	

=== Loan in ===
Pos.	Player	Parent club	Length/Notes	Beginning	End	Source
DF	(Egypt) Amro Tarek	(Spain) Real Betis	Signed via discovery. Original terms were for the entire season, but was placed on waivers on May 5.	February 3, 2016	May 5, 2016	
MF	(Panama) Cristian Martínez	(Panama) Chorrillo F.C.	Loaned with an option to purchase contract	May 17, 2016	End of Season	

=== Out ===
Pos.	Player	Transferred to	Fee/notes	Date	Source
DF	(Jamaica) Sergio Campbell	(United States) Pittsburgh Riverhounds	Placed on waivers	February 12, 2016	
MF	(United States) Romain Gall	(Sweden) Nyköpings BIS	Placed on waivers	February 12, 2016	
FW	(Sierra Leone) Kei Kamara	(United States) New England Revolution	Traded for general allocation money, targeted allocation money, a first round draft pick in the 2017 MLS SuperDraft, a second round draft pick in the 2018 MLS SuperDraft and a 2016 international roster slot. Crew retain a percentage of any future transfer fee.	May 12, 2016	
MF	(Denmark) Emil Larsen	(Denmark) Lyngby	Transfer, terms undisclosed	July 10, 2016	
DF	(United States) Tyson Wahl	Retired		October 24, 2016	
FW	(United States) Conor Casey	Retired		October 24, 2016	
GK	(United States) Steve Clark	(Denmark) AC Horsens	Option declined	November 23, 2016	
GK	(United States) Matt Pacifici	Retired	Option declined	November 23, 2016	
DF	(United States) Corey Ashe	Retired	Option declined	November 23, 2016	
MF	(Democratic Republic of the Congo) Cedrick Mabwati	(Spain) UCAM Murcia CF	Option declined	November 23, 2016	
DF	(United States) Chad Barson	(Sweden) FC Linköping City	Contract expired	November 23, 2016	
DF	(United States) Michael Parkhurst	(United States) Atlanta United FC	Contract expired; Rights traded for general allocation money	November 23, 2016	
MF	(Sweden) Mohammed Saeid	(United States) Minnesota United FC	Selected in the 2016 MLS Expansion Draft	December 13, 2016	

=== Loan out ===
Pos.	Player	Loanee club	Length/Notes	Beginning	End	Source
MF	(United States) Marshall Hollingsworth	(United States) Pittsburgh Riverhounds	On a match-by-match basis. Columbus retains right to recall at any time.	March 17, 2016	September 25, 2016	
MF	(United States) Ben Swanson	(United States) Pittsburgh Riverhounds	On a match-by-match basis. Columbus retains right to recall at any time.	March 17, 2016	July 29, 2016	
DF	(United States) Chad Barson	(United States) Pittsburgh Riverhounds	On a match-by-match basis. Columbus retains right to recall at any time.	April 30, 2016	April 30, 2016	
DF	(United States) Chad Barson	(United States) Pittsburgh Riverhounds	On a match-by-match basis. Columbus retains right to recall at any time.	August 10, 2016	August 20, 2016	
MF	(Panama) Cristian Martínez	(United States) Pittsburgh Riverhounds	On a match-by-match basis. Columbus retains right to recall at any time.	August 10, 2016	September 25, 2016	
MF	(Guatemala) Rodrigo Saravia	(United States) Pittsburgh Riverhounds	On a match-by-match basis. Columbus retains right to recall at any time.	August 10, 2016	August 20, 2016	
GK	(United States) Zack Steffen	(United States) Pittsburgh Riverhounds	On a match-by-match basis. Columbus retains right to recall at any time.	Aug 13, 2016	September 25, 2016	

=== MLS Draft picks ===
Draft picks are not automatically signed to the team roster. Only those who are signed to a contract will be listed as transfers in. The picks for the Columbus Crew are listed below:

2016 Columbus Crew SC SuperDraft Picks
Round	Pick	Player	Position	College
1	19	(Guatemala) Rodrigo Saravia	MF	Florida Gulf Coast
2	21	(United States) Chase Minter	MF	Cal Poly
2	31	(United States) Kyle Parker	FW	UNC Charlotte
2	41	(United States) Marshall Hollingsworth	MF	Wheaton
3	60	(United States) Vince Cicciarelli	FW	Saint Louis

== Awards ==
MLS Team of the Week
Week	Starters	Bench	Opponent(s)	Link
5		(Iraq) Justin Meram	(United States) FC Dallas	
7	(Iraq) Justin Meram	(United States) Ethan Finlay	(United States) New York City FC	
12		(Argentina) Federico Higuaín	(Canada) Toronto FC	
13	(Norway) Ola Kamara	(Argentina) Federico Higuaín	(United States) Real Salt Lake	
14	(Norway) Ola Kamara		(United States) Philadelphia Union	
16		(Norway) Ola Kamara	(United States) New York Red Bulls	
17	(Norway) Ola Kamara		(United States) Sporting Kansas City	
19		(Ghana) Harrison Afful	(Canada) Toronto FC (United States) D.C. United	
20		(Iraq) Justin Meram	(United States) Orlando City SC	
23	(United States) Ethan Finlay		(United States) New York City FC	
24	(United States) Michael Parkhurst	(Argentina) Federico Higuaín	(United States) New England Revolution	
25	(Norway) Nicolai Næss	(United States) Steve Clark	(United States) Philadelphia Union (United States) San Jose Earthquakes	
28	(Norway) Nicolai Næss	(United States) Ethan Finlay (Norway) Ola Kamara	(United States) Orlando City SC	
29	(Ghana) Harrison Afful	(Norway) Ola Kamara	(United States) New England Revolution	
30		(Ghana) Harrison Afful	(United States) D.C. United (United States) Chicago Fire	
32/33	(United States) Adam Jahn		(United States) Chicago Fire (United States) New York Red Bulls	

=== MLS Player of the Week ===
Week	Player	Opponent(s)	Link
13	(Norway) Ola Kamara	Real Salt Lake	

=== MLS Player of the Month ===
Month	Player	Stats	Link
October	(Iraq) Justin Meram	1 goal, 4 assists	

=== 2016 MLS All-Star Game ===
Reserves

- MF Wil Trapp

=== Postseason ===
MLS Fair Play Team Award
Team Administrator of the Year

- Zach Crusse

=== Crew SC Team Awards ===
- Most Valuable Player – Justin Meram
- Golden Boot – Ola Kamara
- Defender of the Year – Harrison Afful
- Humanitarian of the Year – Ethan Finlay
- Kirk Urso Heart Award – Hector Jiménez
- Academy Player of the Year – Devyn Etling

== Kits ==
Home	Away

Type	Shirt	Shorts	Socks	First appearance
Home	Black	Black	Black	Week 3 against Chicago Fire
Away	White/Yellow	Teal	White	Week 1 against Portland Timbers

The away kit was based on the flag of Columbus.
