= Abuchi Obinwa =

American professional soccer player (born 1997)

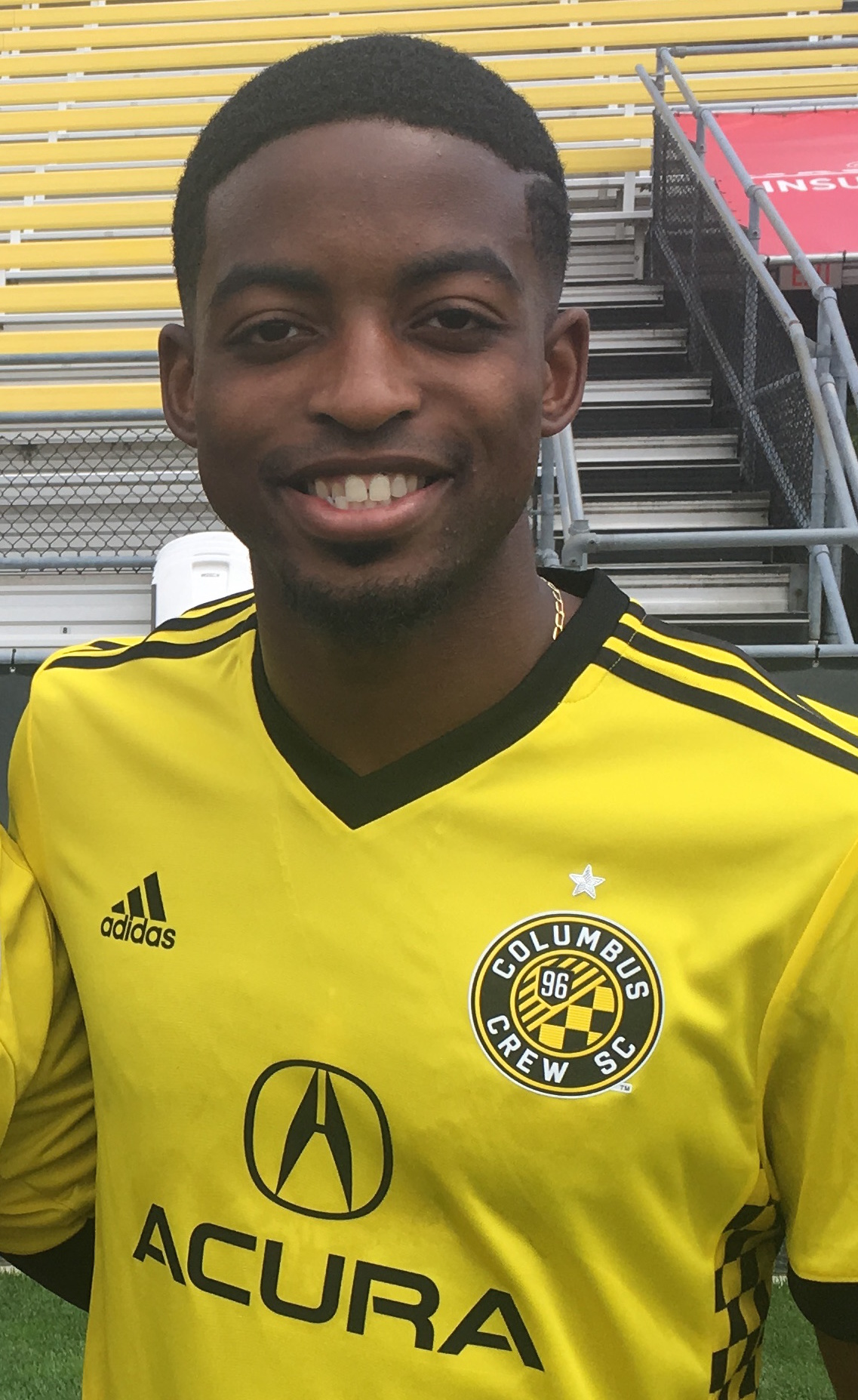
- Obinwa at a Columbus Crew Meet the Team event in 2017

Personal information
- Full name: Maduabuchi Obinwa
- Date of birth: January 15, 1997 (age 29)
- Place of birth: Columbus, Ohio, United States
- Height: 6 ft 1 in (1.85 m)
- Position: Midfielder

Youth career
- Chicago Magic PSG
- 2014–2016: Hannover 96

Senior career*
Years	Team	Apps	(Gls)
2015	Hannover 96 II	0	(0)
2017	Columbus Crew	0	(0)
2017	→ Pittsburgh Riverhounds (loan)	7	(0)
2018	Inter Orlando		
2018–2019	Lusitano FCV	8	(0)
2020–2021	South Georgia Tormenta	38	(0)
2022	Tulsa	19	(0)

International career^{‡}
2014	United States U18	3	(0)
2015	United States U20	2	(0)
- * Club domestic league appearances and goals as of October 20, 2022 ‡ National team caps and goals as of September 7, 2015

Maduabuchi "Abuchi" Obinwa (born January 15, 1997) is an American professional soccer player who plays as a midfielder.

== Youth ==
Born in Columbus, Ohio, Obinwa spent time in his youth with Chicago Magic PSG, an affiliate of French club Paris Saint-Germain. While with the team, he was named the 2013 U.S. Soccer Development Academy's U15/16 Central Conference Player of the Year. He also played with the PSG academy and spent time with the youth academy of Spanish club Real Madrid.

Obinwa signed his first professional contract with German club Hannover 96 on January 29, 2015, six months after he had signed an amateur contract with the club. He never made a professional appearance, only appearing for the U19 side in the Under-19 Bundesliga North/Northeast. Obinwa made six appearances over two seasons with the U19s. He also appeared once on the bench for Hannover 96 II in the Regionalliga Nord. Obinwa was an unused substitute against VfR Neumünster on March 29, 2015.

== Club career ==
=== Columbus Crew SC ===
On January 25, 2017, Obinwa signed with his hometown club Columbus Crew of Major League Soccer. He made his first appearance for Columbus on July 17 in a friendly against German club Eintracht Frankfurt, replacing Mohammed Abu in the 67th minute of a 1–0 victory for Crew SC. Obinwa spent the rest of the season on loan to Pittsburgh, and finished the year without appearing again for Crew SC.

On December 1, 2017, Crew SC declined Obinwa's contract option. He left the club after just one season, and did not make an official appearance while in Columbus.

==== Loan to Pittsburgh Riverhounds ====
On March 25, 2017, Columbus sent Obinwa on loan to their affiliate Pittsburgh Riverhounds in the USL. Obinwa made his professional debut on April 8, 2017, against Charleston Battery, entering in the 13th minute to replace fellow Crew SC loanee Ben Swanson as the Riverhounds picked up a 2–1 victory. Four days later, April 12, he started for the first time in his professional career, against Saint Louis FC. Obinwa played 67 minutes before being replaced by Michael Green as the Riverhounds were defeated 2–1. Obinwa played sparingly for the remainder of the season, finishing the year with just seven appearances for Pittsburgh.

=== Lusitano FCV ===
Obinwa joined Portuguese third division side Lusitano FCV in 2018.

=== South Georgia Tormenta FC ===
Obinwa returned to the United States by signing with USL League One's South Georgia Tormenta FC on December 12, 2019.

=== FC Tulsa ===
On January 20, 2022, Obinwa signed with USL Championship club FC Tulsa. He was released by Tulsa following the 2022 season.

== International career ==
Obinwa has represented the United States at U15, U16, U17, U18, and U20 level. Obinwa made three appearances for the U18s at the 2014 U18 International Tournament in Lisbon, Portugal, where he played alongside future club teammate Ben Swanson. He would be called up for the U20 team for the 2015 Stevan Vilotic-Cele Tournament in Serbia, again playing alongside Swanson and making two appearances.

As a dual-citizen, Obinwa is eligible to represent the United States or Nigeria. He also qualifies for the Super Eagles through his parents, who are both Nigerian.

=== Nigeria age fabrication scandal ===
In July 2013, sixteen-year-old Obinwa controversially failed an MRI test when undergoing assessment to represent the Nigeria U17 team at the 2013 FIFA U-17 World Cup despite having the necessary paperwork from his country of birth, the United States. Nigeria went on to win the tournament and claim their fourth U-17 World Cup.

== Career statistics ==
As of July 8, 2018

Club	Season	League			Cup		Continental		Other		Total	
Club	Season	Division	Apps	Goals	Apps	Goals	Apps	Goals	Apps	Goals	Apps	Goals
Hannover 96 II	2014–15	Regionalliga Nord	0	0	–		–		–		0	0
Columbus Crew	2017	MLS	0	0	0	0	–		0	0	0	0
Pittsburgh Riverhounds (loan)	2017	USL	7	0	0	0	–		–		7	0
Inter Orlando	2018	UPSL	0	0	–		–		–		0	0
Career total			7	0	0	0	0	0	0	0	7	0
