= Age fabrication =

Misrepresenting a person's age

Age fabrication occurs when people deliberately misrepresent their true age. This is usually done with the intent to garner privileges or status that would not otherwise be available to that person (e.g. a minor misrepresenting their age in order to garner the privileges given to adults). It may be done through the use of oral or written statements or through the altering, doctoring or forging of vital records.

On some occasions, age is increased so as to make cut-offs for minimum legal or employable age in show business or professional sports. Sometimes it is not the people themselves who lower their public age, but others around them such as publicists, parents, and other handlers. Most cases involve taking or adding one or two years to their age. However, in more extreme cases such as with Al Lewis and Charo, over a decade has been added or subtracted. Official state documents (such as birth, marriage and death certificates, the census, and other identity documents) typically provide the correct date.

Although uncommon in modern first-world countries, it is still possible for a person not to know their exact date of birth, especially if they were born in a country where birth records were not written until recently. Such a person may arbitrarily choose a date of birth that after later research is found to be false. This situation should not be considered age fabrication as there is no obvious intent to deceive on the part of the individual.

== Sports ==
In sports, people may falsify their age to make themselves appear younger, thus enabling them to compete in world-level junior events (with prominent examples appearing in football (soccer) and athletics). In gymnastics, diving, and figure skating, competitors may claim to be older in order to bring themselves over the age minimums for senior competition or below an age limit for junior competition. A female pair skater may be aged up, while her male partner may be aged down to allow them to compete together. In some cases, they may feel pressure to change their ages. As these fabrications have an effect upon a person's performance (through the greater strength that comes with age or the greater flexibility of youth), the practice is known as age cheating in the field of sports.

== Entertainment ==
The entertainment industry features frequent age fabrication, as youth is typically valued and praised. There have been countless instances of age fabrication in Hollywood. Some of the most notorious examples include socialite Zsa Zsa Gabor, actress/director Sondra Locke and singer Loretta Lynn.

== Online and social media ==
Many websites and online services ban children under 13 from joining their platforms in compliance with the Children's Online Privacy Protection Act, a U.S. federal law that prohibits website operators under U.S. jurisdiction from collecting personal information about children under age 13 without parental consent. To avoid the ban, many children under 13 falsify their age in order to sign up to use those websites, many with the help of an adult. As of 2012, it was estimated that around 5 million Facebook users were under 13.

== Law and politics ==
=== Conscription ===
- There are many stories of men lying about their age to join the armed forces; for example, to fight in World War I. In mid-1918, Walt Disney attempted to join the United States Army to fight against the Germans, but he was rejected for being too young. After forging the date of birth on his birth certificate to 1900, he joined the Red Cross in September 1918 as an ambulance driver. Conversely, those wishing to avoid conscription may also falsify their age: the birthdate of Henryk Gulbinowicz, Bishop Emeritus of Wrocław, Poland, and a cardinal of the Roman Catholic Church, was changed from 1923 to 1928 by his parents and his parish priest to prevent him from being conscripted during World War II. Dan Bullock became the youngest American soldier to die in the Vietnam War at age 15, by enlisting in the Marine Corps the previous year after altering his birth certificate to show a birthdate of four years earlier.

=== Immigration ===
- In 2016, it was reported that the United Kingdom Home Office performed age assessments on refugees from Calais who self-reported as minors but did not have documentation to prove their age. The age assessments included extensive interviews and the "physical appearance and demeanour" of the asylum-seekers. Of those assessed, in two-thirds of cases, the Home Office deemed them to be adults. A representative from the Coram Children's Legal Centre criticized the age assessment process, stating that absent documentation, "assessing age is notoriously difficult" and that "children as young as 14 are often incorrectly assessed as adults". A spokesperson for the Royal College of Paediatrics and Child Health stated "[t]here is no single reliable method for making precise age estimates".

=== Politics ===
- Joseph Stalin, born December 18 (December 6 OS), 1878, changed the date to December 21, 1879, later in his life for unknown reasons. The December 18, 1878, birth date is maintained by his birth registry, his school leaving certificate, his extensive tsarist Russia police file, and all other surviving pre-revolution documents. Russian playwright and historian Edward Radzinski argues in his book, Stalin, that Stalin changed the year to 1879 to have a national birthday celebration of his 50th birthday. He could not do it in 1928 because his rule was not absolute enough. The incorrect December 21, 1879, date was printed in many almanacs and encyclopedias during Stalin's reign and remains one of the most widely reported incorrect dates of birth.
- Eva Perón, born May 7, 1919, had her birth certificate altered to 1922 after becoming First Lady of Argentina. She made herself seem to be younger and also to appear that her parents had been married when she was born.
