= Age fraud in association football =

Use of false documentation

Age fraud is age fabrication or the use of false documentation to gain an advantage over opponents. In football, it is common amongst players belonging to nations where records are not easily verifiable. The media often refer to the player with false documentation as an "age-cheat".

There are several reasons why players choose to use false documentation. European scouts are looking for young talented players from poorer countries to sign for a European club. The players know that there is a lesser chance of being signed if they are, for example, 23 years old as opposed to 17 years old as there would be less time for the club to develop the player.

Age fabrication also allows an older player to enter in youth competitions. FIFA says that "over-age players have been wrongly entered into various youth competitions, often benefiting from an unfair advantage due to their greater physical maturity compared to players of the proper age."

In some cases, it is possible for the player not to know their own date of birth and make an approximate guess when it comes to gaining official documents.

== Introduction of MRI ==
The mandatory use of magnetic resonance imaging (MRI) was introduced by FIFA in 2009 for the FIFA U-17 World Cup to help ascertain whether players are over age or not.

MRI is considered to be 99% accurate until the age of 17, after which it becomes harder for medical professionals to calculate a person's age. Professor Jiri Dvorak of FIFA said: "The efficiency stops at 17 and it's just pure coincidence that FIFA made their competition an Under-17 event". Every bone in the arm and leg has an end plate from which bones grow. When the growth is completed (usually around the age of 17-18), then this end plate disappears on the MRI scans. Dvorak concedes that the scan results "will be unjust to 1% of all examined players".

The researchers had classified the scans into 6 grading system, as follows:

| Grade | Comment | Eligibility for U16/U17 tournament |
|---|---|---|
| 1 | Completely unfused (physis may be thin) | Player eligible |
| 2 | Early fusion: minimal hyper intensity within physis | Player eligible |
| 3 | Trabecular fusion of less than 50% of radial cross-sectional area (number of sections (full width) with fusion below 50%) | Player eligible |
| 4 | Trabecular fusion of more than 50% of radial cross-sectional area (number of sections (full width) above 50%) or more than 5 mm non-fused on any one section | Player eligible |
| 5 | Residual physis, less than 5 mm on any one section | Player eligible |
| 6 | Completely fused | Player not eligible |

Of the 429 MRI conducted by the Asian Football Confederation in 2007, 10 players (or 2.7%) were found to be over the age of 16 years in an otherwise Under-15 tournament. In 2008, one out of the 116 MRI conducted had full fusion.

Not everybody was pleased by the introduction of MRI. Nigeria had lost 15 players after they were proven to be over-age. Nigeria's Football Federation President Sani Lulu said: "I’ll not use the MRI to disqualify my players." He felt that FIFA had sprung their decision to use MRI upon the nations.

Lulu wanted to invite the parents of the national Under-17 players to verify their sons' ages. Nigerian Sports Minister Sani Ndanusa dismissed the parent verification system and stated the "whole world has gone digital and we're following suit. We're no longer in the analogue era."

Lulu stated that NFF did not need to scan players as it wasn't in the competition's rules and regulations. Ndanusa stated: "FIFA wants MRI scans used and we're going to adhere to that, simple."

For the same tournament, the Gambia Football Association had scanned 53 of its players and "few" failed. It was suggested that "two or three" whom the MRI scan had revealed to be overage were participants at the 2009 African Under-17 Championship.

== Pre-MRI examples ==
=== Africa ===
- One of the best known examples of a player falsifying documentations is Cameroon's international football defender Tobie Mimboe who held several documents during the course of his career that indicated he became younger as time went by.
- In 1989 Nigeria's youth national teams were banned by FIFA for fielding over-age players in FIFA-organised youth tournaments. The birth dates of three players at the 1988 Olympics were different than the ones used by those players at previous tournaments. The resulting ban lasted for two years and Nigeria was also stripped of its right to host the 1991 FIFA World Youth Championship.
- South African journalist Thomas Kwenaite uncovered several "age-cheats" representing South Africa who participated in an Under-15 age group tournament hosted in France. The captain of that side was a 24-year-old third-year University student from Port Elizabeth. After revealing the age of the player, the player's father took Kwenaite to the South African press ombudsman for "slander" before withdrawing his complaint after it was found that school records show that the player would have started school aged 2 years old. Kwenaite also claims that he was told that he was "unpatriotic" for reporting the story.
- In late 1999, Anthony Kojo Williams was appointed as head of the Nigeria Football Federation. He lasted less than three months in the job and was dismissed because, in NFF board member Zaria Sani's words "he has failed to carry the other board members along". In the 2010 BBC World service documentary Africa Kicks, Williams stated that the Nigerian Government were "afraid of change". He went on to say, "I don't see Nigerian football getting out of the quagmire, the problem it is in today is because it [corruption] is getting deeper and deeper and deeper. From time to time we get flashes where we do well in some competition with overage players and we celebrate. That was one of the issues I looked at, we can't keep using overage players. We use over-age players for junior championships, I know that. Why not say it? It's the truth. We always cheat. It's a fact. When you cheat, you deprive the young stars that are supposed to play in these competitions their rights."

We use over-age players for junior championships, I know that. Why not say it? It's the truth. We always cheat.

— Anthony Kojo Williams, NFF Chairman, 1999-2000.
- In 2003, Kenya's Under-17 national team were dissolved by the Kenyan Government after some players revealed themselves to be over 18 years of age. The same year, Ghana's Deputy Youth and Sports Minister Joe Aggrey said he wished to stop age cheats.
- In 2009, Nigerian journalist Adokiye Amiesimaka accused the Nigeria Football Federation (NFF) of being complicit with age-cheats because it gave the nation a competitive advantage. He had what he considered to be proof that some players were overage but the NFF were not interested in taking his complaint seriously.

=== Asia ===
- The Asian Football Confederation ejected DPR Korea, Tajikistan and Iraq from the 2008 AFC U-16 Championship after qualifying, and Cambodia, Macau, Bangladesh, Tajikistan, Bhutan and Kyrgyzstan were ejected from the qualifying after being found to have fielded over-age players, while Yemen were ejected from the tournament for fielding an overage player.
- Sixteen players were banned by AFC in 2000 and eight were banned in the 2010 AFC U-16 Championship.
- Pakistan and Yemen fielded eight and four overage players respectively at the 2002 AFC U-17 Championship, and were fined and suspended for taking part in the next 2004 AFC U-17 Championship.
- AFC introduced age detection methods in its age group competitions in 2000.

=== Europe ===
- Dave Bowler, author of Winning Isn't Everything: Biography of Sir Alf Ramsey, claims that Englishman Alf Ramsey forged documents so that his date of birth changed from 1920 to 1922. Bowler alleges that Ramsey feared that come the end of the Second World War, he would be considered too old to be offered a professional contract.

=== The Americas ===
- The false passports case involving the Chile national under-20 football team was a scandal that took place in January 1979, when several players participated in the 1979 South American U-20 Championship in Paysandú using falsified identity documents to conceal their real ages. The scheme was reportedly devised by Pedro García, Eduardo Gordon, Luis Zúñiga, and Enrique Jorquera. The subsequent investigation uncovered a broader network dedicated to forging identity cards and passports, allegedly carried out with the complicity of public officials. The players later returned to their clubs without receiving major sanctions, while García was sentenced to nearly three years in prison, a sentence that was never served.
- In the scandal known as the Cachirules, all of Mexico's international teams were banned for two years by FIFA from international competition in 1988 when the Under-20 national team was proven to have consciously fielded several over-age players.
- Brazilian Carlos Alberto de Oliveira Júnior won the 2003 FIFA World Youth Championship using fake documents to claim that he was born on 24 January 1983. Because of this, he was banned for 360 days from football.
- An Ecuadorian footballer, real name Ángel Cheme, played the majority of his professional career as Gonzalo Chila, which was the real name of a player three years his junior whom he had met when they both had trials at a local club, thus enabling him to play in age-restricted matches for three years after he was entitled to do so; he was eventually suspended for two years.

== Post-MRI examples ==
=== Africa ===
- In December 2010, the Senegal Football Federation withdrew Diawandou Diagne, Hervé Diédhiou and Samba Diallo from their under-17 national team after it was found they were overage following an MRI scan.
- In 2011, the Confederation of African Football (CAF) enforced the use of MRI for the 2011 African Under-17 Championship.
- In February 2011, Ivorian football manager and SuperSport television pundit Mamadou Gaye responded to a question asking who he thought would win the 2011 U-17 World Cup with "...any of the four team representing us [Africa] in the world cup U17 can win the trophee [sic], because at that level we like cheating on our age."
- In July 2013, sixteen-year-old United States-born Abuchi Obinwa failed an MRI test when undergoing assessment to represent the Nigeria U17 team at the 2013 FIFA U-17 World Cup.
- In 2014, the Ghana under-17 team were banned from the 2015 African U-17 Championship after it was found that they were guilty of age cheating in a qualifier against Cameroon. Cameroon replaced them in the competition finals.
- In August 2016, it was reported that 26 Nigeria U17 players had failed MRI tests prior to their match against Niger U17's.
- In 2017, Cameroon's football governing body, Fecafoot, blocked 14 players from taking part in the 2017 Africa U-17 Cup of Nations after they failed MRI tests.
- In May 2019, Guinea's U-17 Under-17 national team were found guilty by CAF for age fabrication of two players, Aboubacar Conte and Ahmed Tidiane Keita, at the 2019 Africa U-17 Cup of Nations. Hence, they lost their place in the 2019 FIFA U-17 World Cup.
- In June 2022, after Morocco under-17 beat Ghana under-17 to qualify for the 2022 FIFA U-17 Women's World Cup, Morocco launched a complaint to The Confederation of African Football (Caf), claiming that two of the Ghanaian players were overage. Caf investigated the claim, and banned Ghana from qualification to the next two World Cups, also issuing a $100,000 fine. The Ghana Football Association went on to appeal this verdict.
- In January 2023, 32 Cameroonian players in the country’s under-17 team failed MRI age testing in the build up to qualification games for the 2023 Africa U-17 Cup of Nations. The tests had been requested by the president of Fecafoot, Samuel Eto’o.

=== Oceania ===
- In 2018, the Solomon Islands, which originally finished second in the 2018 OFC U-16 Championship, were found by the Oceania Football Confederation to have deliberately fielded overage player Chris Satu during the tournament. As a result, they forfeited their results and also their place in the 2019 FIFA U-17 World Cup. However, the decision was appealed by the Solomon Islands Football Federation, and the OFC Executive Committee met to decide on their replacement after the appeal process has been concluded and decided to uphold the appeal, thus allowing Solomon Islands to take part in the tournament. Solomon Islands were later found to have fielded at least one other overage player in the qualifying tournament and subsequently banned from participating in the qualifying and finals for the 2021 FIFA U-17 World Cup.
