= Keasel Broome =

Barbadian footballer

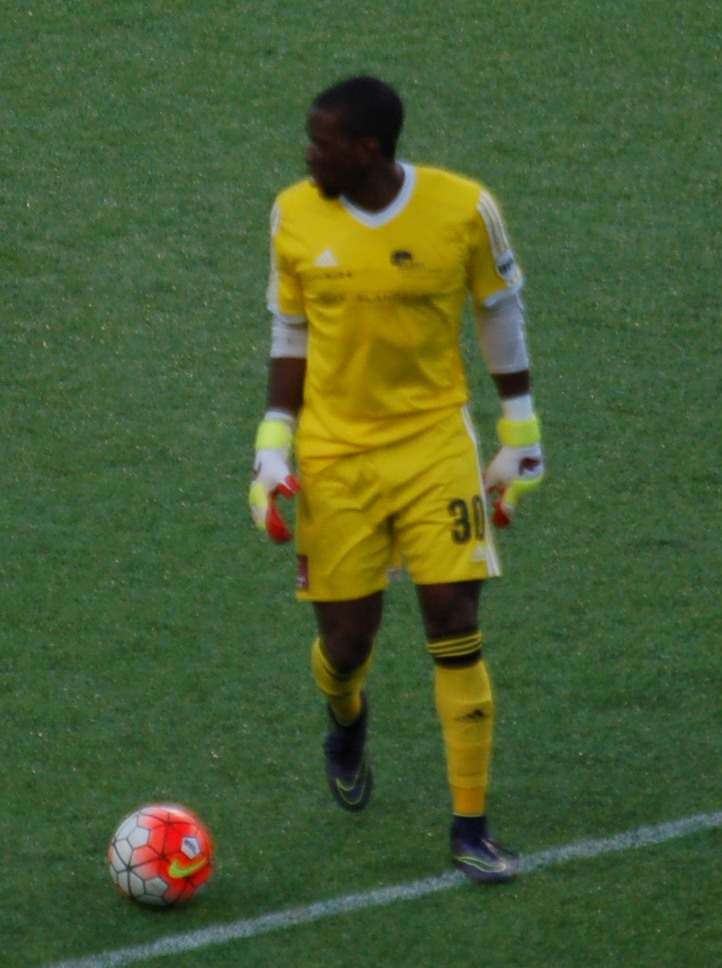
- Broome in 2016

Personal information
- Full name: Keasel Broome, Jr.
- Date of birth: 18 September 1991 (age 35)
- Place of birth: Claymont, Delaware, United States
- Height: 1.83 m (6 ft 0 in)
- Position: Goalkeeper

Team information
- Current team: Pittsburgh Hotspurs

Youth career
- 2008–2010: FC DELCO

College career
Years	Team	Apps	(Gls)
2010–2014	Providence Friars	59	(0)

Senior career*
Years	Team	Apps	(Gls)
2012	Reading United	3	(0)
2013	Ocean City Nor'easters	2	(0)
2014	Real Boston Rams	4	(0)
2015	New York Cosmos	0	(0)
2016	Harrisburg City Islanders	13	(0)
2017	Pittsburgh Riverhounds	6	(0)
2019–	Pittsburgh Hotspurs	3	(0)

International career^{‡}
2015–	Barbados	8	(0)
- * Club domestic league appearances and goals as of 13 July 2019 ‡ National team caps and goals as of 25 March 2018

Keasel Broome (born 18 September 1991) is a Barbadian footballer who plays as a goalkeeper for National Premier Soccer League club Pittsburgh Hotspurs and the Barbadian national team.

== Career ==
=== College ===
Prior to attending Providence College, played with Caravel Academy, and helped the academy to the state soccer title in 2009. In 2014 Broome played every minute of every game for the Providence Friars, securing a 2–1 win over Xavier in the Big East title game and subsequent NCAA triumphs over Dartmouth, Cal-Irvine, and Michigan State.

=== Professional ===
Broome was selected in the 3rd Round of the 2015 MLS SuperDraft by the San Jose Earthquakes but was ultimately not signed.

On April 1, 2015, Broome signed with NASL club New York Cosmos.

“I’m thrilled about this opportunity to join the Cosmos,” said Broome. “Having just finished college this is a really exciting development in my career, being signed to a world-famous club with a talented squad.”

“Broome is a young player with a lot of potential,” said Cosmos head coach Giovanni Savarese. “He travelled with us during our preseason tour and we were impressed by what we saw during training. He has a great attitude and will fit in well here at the Cosmos.”

== International career ==
Broome became a citizen in Barbados in 2004 and was eligible through his Barbadian father. Broome was called up by the Barbados national football team for the first time in March 2015 but was unable to accept due to injury. He was called up again in June 2015 for Barbados's 2018 World Cup qualification matches against Aruba. Broome made his international debut in the first leg of the qualification series on 10 June 2015, posting a shutout as Barbados won 2–0.

== International career statistics ==
As of match played 29 March 2016.

Barbados national team
Year	Apps	Goals
2015	2	0
2016	2	0
Total	4	0
