= Ryan Dodson =

American professional soccer player

Personal information
- Full name: Ryan Nicholas Dodson
- Date of birth: 14 October 1992 (age 34)
- Place of birth: Aurora, Illinois, United States
- Height: 6 ft 0 in (1.83 m)
- Positions: Defender; winger; forward

College career
Years	Team	Apps	(Gls)
2011	North Carolina Tar Heels	5	(0)
2012–2014	Denver Pioneers	57	(3)

Senior career*
Years	Team	Apps	(Gls)
2015	IFK Stockaryd/Rörviks IF		
2016	Pittsburgh Riverhounds	1	(0)
- * Club domestic league appearances and goals as of May 12, 2016

Ryan Nicholas Dodson (born October 14, 1992) is an American professional soccer player.

== Career ==
=== Youth and Club ===
Dodson played one year of college soccer at the University of North Carolina at Chapel Hill in 2011, before transferring to University of Denver the following year.

Out of college, Dodson went unrated in the 2015 MLS SuperDraft, later signing with Swedish side IFK Stockaryd/IF Rörviks.

After a year in Sweden, Dodson signed with United Soccer League side Pittsburgh Riverhounds on February 11, 2016. He was released by Pittsburgh four months later. His lone appearance came on May 14, 2016, where he came on as a sub and played 18 minutes vs. FC Cincinnati.

== Personal life ==
Two of Dodson's siblings are also soccer players. His brother, Derek, played for the Georgetown Hoyas (2011) and, as of the 2023 USL Championship season, plays professionally with Charleston Battery. His sister, Kristen, played for the Auburn Tigers (2014–17).
