= Victor Souto =

Brazilian footballer

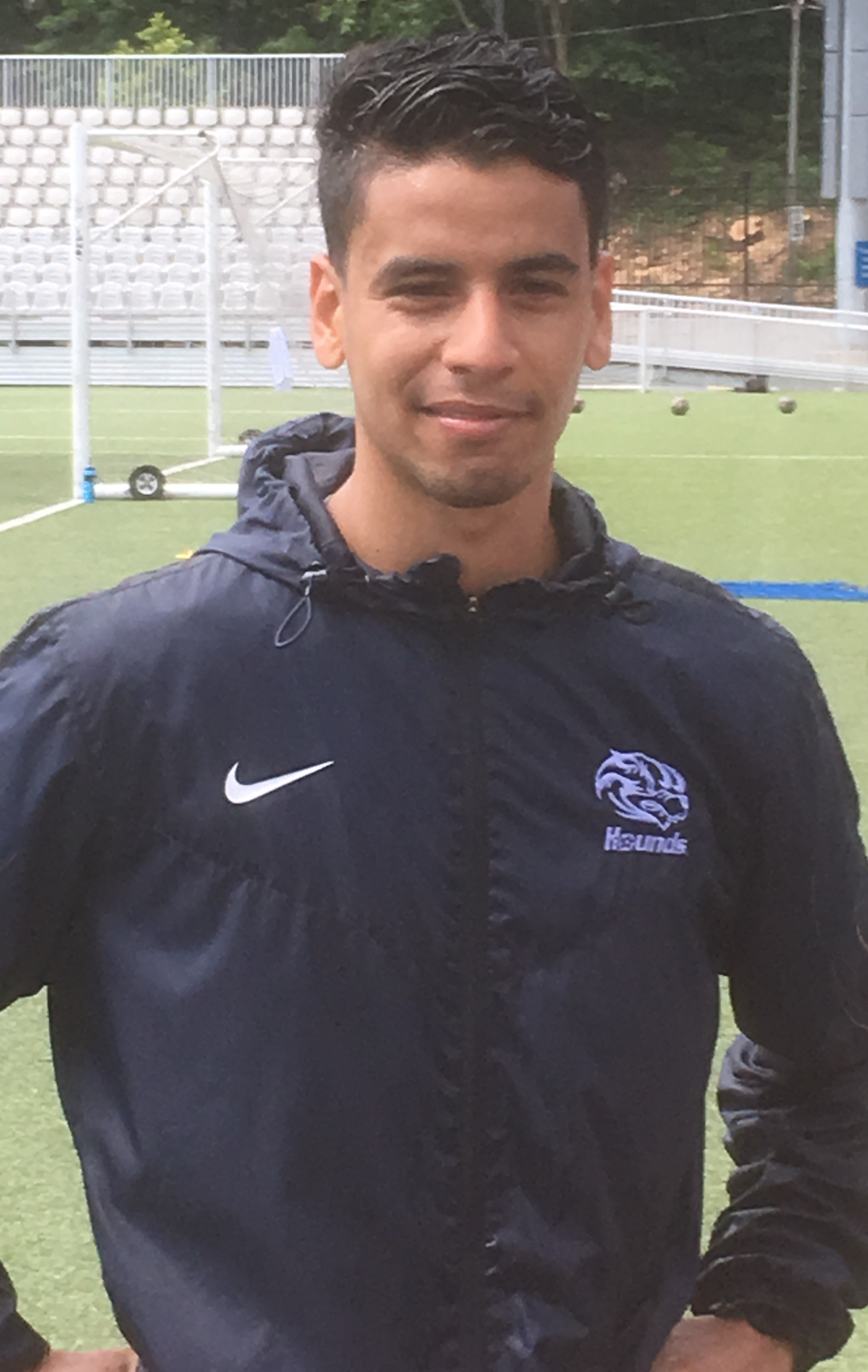

Personal information
- Full name: Victor Augusto Souto
- Date of birth: January 7, 1993 (age 33)
- Place of birth: São Paulo, Brazil
- Height: 1.80 m (5 ft 11 in)
- Position: Midfielder

Team information
- Current team: Atlantic City FC

Youth career
- 2000–2012: Corinthians

College career
Years	Team	Apps	(Gls)
2013–2016	Akron Zips	66	(10)

Senior career*
Years	Team	Apps	(Gls)
2013	Portland Timbers U23s	7	(1)
2014	Orlando City U-23	10	(0)
2017	Pittsburgh Riverhounds	26	(2)
2018–	Atlantic City FC	0	(0)
- * Club domestic league appearances and goals as of March 9, 2018

Victor Augusto Souto (born 7 January 1993) is a Brazilian footballer who currently plays for Atlantic City FC of the National Premier Soccer League.

== Career ==
=== Youth and college ===
Souto played college soccer at the University of Akron between 2013 and 2016,

While at Akron, Souto appeared for Portland Timbers U23s and Orlando City U-23 in the USL PDL.

=== Professional ===
Souto signed his first professional contract on December 29, 2016, joining United Soccer League side Pittsburgh Riverhounds ahead of their 2017 season. However, he lasted just one season with the club, and his contract option was declined by Pittsburgh on November 30, 2017.
