= Matt Pacifici =

American soccer player (born 1993)

Personal information
- Date of birth: August 31, 1993 (age 33)
- Place of birth: Charlotte, North Carolina, U.S.
- Height: 6 ft 2 in (1.88 m)
- Position: Goalkeeper

Youth career
- –2010: South Charlotte Soccer Academy
- 2010–2011: North Meck Soccer Club

College career
Years	Team	Apps	(Gls)
2011	Wake Forest Demon Deacons	0	(0)
2012–2015	Davidson Wildcats	70	(0)

Senior career*
Years	Team	Apps	(Gls)
2016	Columbus Crew	0	(0)
- * Club domestic league appearances and goals

Matthew Pacifici (born August 31, 1993) is an American former professional soccer player who played as a goalkeeper.

== Youth and college career ==
=== High school ===
Pacifici was a varsity soccer player at Charlotte Catholic High School for four years, where he compiled a 46-4-4 record during his high school career, including 36 shutouts. His final year, he captained the team and led the nation with 21 shutouts including 16 consecutive. Pacifici was part of a 3-A State Championship team in 2008.

=== College ===
==== Wake Forest ====
Pacifici spent his first year of college at Wake Forest, where he earned a medical redshirt after injuries prevented him from playing during his freshman season.

==== Davidson ====
Pacifici transferred to Davidson College beginning with the 2012 season, where he played in 70 games over the course of his career, going 28–31–10. His career goals against average was 1.45. He was named 2nd team All-Conference in 2014 while recording a 0.65 goals against average and seven shutouts. He was a two-year team captain.

== Club career ==
After graduating from Davidson, Pacifici went undrafted but was invited to training camp with the Columbus Crew. During the preseason, he held Real Salt Lake and Colorado Rapids scoreless. The Crew signed Pacifici to a contract in March 2016. A concussion placed Pacifici on the season ending injury list in July. He was forced to retire after developing postural orthostatic tachycardia syndrome following the concussion.

== Personal life ==
Pacifici became the fifth openly gay current or former Major League Soccer player when he came out on Instagram in January 2019.
