= Marshall Hollingsworth =

American soccer player

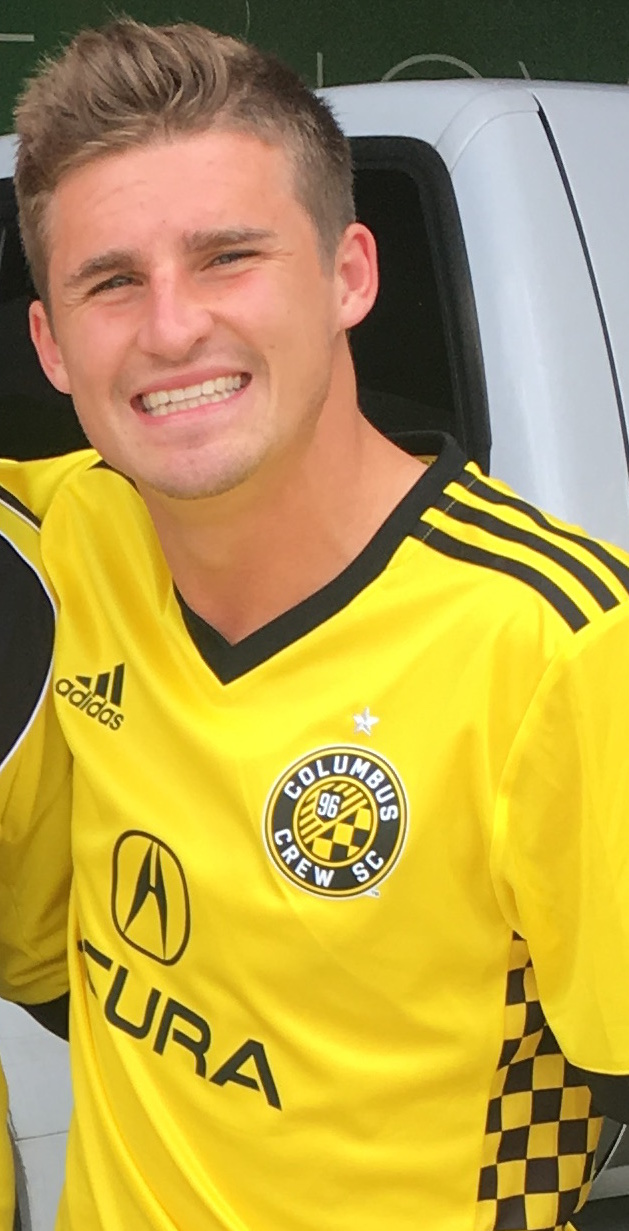
- Hollingsworth with Columbus in 2017.

Personal information
- Date of birth: August 6, 1993 (age 33)
- Place of birth: Libertyville, Illinois, United States
- Height: 5 ft 8 in (1.73 m)
- Positions: Midfielder; fullback

College career
Years	Team	Apps	(Gls)
2012–2015	Wheaton Thunder	90	(41)

Senior career*
Years	Team	Apps	(Gls)
2016–2017	Columbus Crew SC	0	(0)
2016–2017	→ Pittsburgh Riverhounds (loan)	45	(2)
2019	Lansing Ignite	13	(0)
Total		58	(2)
- * Club domestic league appearances and goals

Marshall Hollingsworth (born August 6, 1993) is an American retired soccer player who played as a midfielder and fullback. After graduating from Wheaton College, he played professionally for Columbus Crew SC, Pittsburgh Riverhounds, and Lansing Ignite.

Hollingsworth was drafted by Columbus Crew SC in the second round of the 2016 MLS SuperDraft. He was under contract with the club for two seasons, but only played in one game for Crew SC, a fourth round tie in the 2016 U.S. Open Cup against Tampa Bay Rowdies. He scored his only goal for the club in that match. Hollingsworth was sent on loan to Pittsburgh Riverhounds in the United Soccer League for the majority of both seasons, eventually appearing nearly 50 times for the Riverhounds. He announced his retirement from professional soccer following the 2017 season due to recurring knee injuries, the latest of which he had suffered in August 2017 while with Pittsburgh; the injury forced him to undergo a meniscus transplant shortly after his retirement. After a season away from the game, however, he returned and signed with Lansing Ignite in March 2019.

== Early life ==
Born in Libertyville, Illinois, Hollingsworth attended Libertyville High School. He was a three-year varsity starter for the Wildcats and was twice named IHSA All-State. As a junior in 2010, Hollingsworth led the Wildcats to a state runner-up finish, losing in the 3A championship game to Boylan Catholic High School. His senior season, Libertyville won the Pepsi Showdown over Lyons Township High School, as well as a regional championship, but were knocked out in the sectional semifinals by Fremd High School. Hollingsworth was named IHSA All-Midwest and was named as the Lake County All-Area Captain his senior season.

== College ==
Hollingsworth played college soccer for Wheaton College, an NCAA Division III school in the CCIW. He stepped directly into a starting role his freshman season, starting 19 of 23 matches he appeared in. He scored nine goals and added three assists, including scoring the game-winning goal five times. On November 16, 2012, Hollingsworth scored the only goal of a 1–0 victory over Dominican in the NCAA Tournament quarterfinals. Hollingsworth was named as the CCIW Newcomer of the Year and was named First Team All-CCIW. Hollingsworth dropped off slightly his sophomore season, tallying just five goals and four assists in 21 appearances. He tallied his first multi-goal game for the Thunder on October 23, 2013, against Augustana in a 5–2 victory for Wheaton. After scoring the game-winning goal three days later against Millikin, in a 3–2 victory, he was named as the CCIW Offensive Player of the Week. He closed the season by being named First Team All-CCIW.

Hollingsworth started all 26 games as a junior, scoring nine goals with eight assists. As the Thunder finished as national runners-up, Hollingsworth was named to the NCAA All-Tournament Team, First Team All-CCIW, and as the CCIW Player of the Year. Hollingsworth saved his best, however, for his senior season. He scored 22 goals in 22 games, tacking on six assists as part of the seventh-most goals in a season in program history. He scored the game-winning goal six times, including in the second round of the NCAA Tournament in a 1–0 victory over Wisconsin-Whitewater. Hollingsworth repeated as CCIW Player of the Year and made First Team All-CCIW for the fourth season in a row. Hollingsworth ended his college career with 41 goals and 21 assists in 90 games.

== Club career ==
=== Columbus Crew SC ===
On January 14, 2016, Hollingsworth was selected by Columbus Crew SC with the 41st pick of the 2016 MLS SuperDraft. He became the first soccer player from Libertyville High School to go pro, and became the first soccer player in Wheaton College history to be drafted in the MLS draft. He officially signed for Crew SC on March 4, 2016, after taking part in preseason with the club.

Hollingsworth made his first appearance while under contract with Columbus on May 11, 2016, a friendly against Tiburones Rojos de Veracruz. He was brought on at halftime and played 45 minutes in the 1–0 victory for Crew SC. Officially, Hollingsworth's debut for Columbus came on June 15, in the fourth round of the 2016 U.S. Open Cup. Off a feed from Hector Jiménez in the 65th minute, Hollingsworth notched his first career goal in the 4–0 win against Tampa Bay Rowdies. He did not make an appearance for Columbus in league play, spending the entirety of the season on loan.

For the second straight season, Hollingsworth was sent on loan by Columbus. Unlike 2016, he was not recalled to play in the U.S. Open Cup, instead being left on loan. Hollingsworth suffered a knee injury in mid-August while on loan, putting him out for the year. He did not make an appearance for Columbus during the 2017 season.

On December 1, 2017, Crew SC declined Hollingsworth's contract option, ending his two-year stint in Columbus. Hollingsworth finished his time with Crew SC with just one official appearance and one goal, but never appeared for the club in MLS.

==== Loan to Pittsburgh ====
Hollingsworth was loaned to Crew SC's affiliate club, Pittsburgh Riverhounds, on March 17, 2016. He made his professional debut on April 2, 2016, in the Riverhounds' season opener against Rochester Rhinos. Hollingsworth played the full 90 minutes in a 1–0 defeat for Pittsburgh. On April 17, Hollingsworth tallied his first point while on loan, providing the assist on a Romeo Parkes goal in the 41st minute against Toronto FC II. The match ended in a 2–2 draw. Hollingsworth finished the 2016 season with one assist in 24 appearances.

Hollingsworth played in the preseason for Pittsburgh, tallying a 53rd-minute goal in a 3–0 victory over Akron and starting against Charleston. On March 4, 2017, Crew SC officially announced that Hollingsworth would be returning to Pittsburgh on loan, again on a game-by-game basis, for the 2017 season. He started in the season opener against New York Red Bulls II and picked up an assist on Kevin Kerr's 39th-minute goal as part of a 3–3 draw. Hollingsworth scored his first goal with Pittsburgh on April 8 in a 2–1 victory over Charleston Battery. Off a feed from Kay Banjo, Hollingsworth scored in the 59th minute to tally his first USL goal. He scored again on April 22 in a 2–1 defeat away to Richmond Kickers, a 60th minute blast that was nominated for USL Goal of the Week. Hollingsworth would see his season cut short by injury, suffering a knee injury in mid-August that put him out for the rest of the year. He finished the season with 20 appearances for Pittsburgh, tallying two goals.

=== Lansing Ignite ===
After spending 2018 rehabbing his injury, Hollingsworth returned to professional soccer by signing with Lansing Ignite FC of USL League One on March 27, 2019.

== Career statistics ==
Appearances and goals by club, season and competition
Club	Season	League			Cup (Note: All appearances in the U.S. Open Cup)		Other		Total	
Club	Season	Division	Apps	Goals	Apps	Goals	Apps	Goals	Apps	Goals
Columbus Crew SC	2016	MLS	0	0	1	1	—		1	1
Columbus Crew SC	2017	MLS	0	0	0	0	0	0	0	0
Columbus Crew SC	Total		0	0	1	1	0	0	1	1
Pittsburgh Riverhounds (loan)	2016	USL	25	0	0	0	—		25	0
Pittsburgh Riverhounds (loan)	2017	USL	20	2	0	0	—		20	2
Pittsburgh Riverhounds (loan)	Total		45	2	0	0	0	0	45	2
Lansing Ignite	2019	USL League One	13	0	2	0	0	0	15	0
Career total			58	2	3	1	0	0	61	3
