= Jamal Jack =

Trinidadian footballer (born 1987)

Personal information
- Date of birth: December 17, 1987 (age 38)
- Place of birth: Charlotteville, Tobago
- Height: 1.90 m (6 ft 3 in)
- Position: Centre-back

Senior career*
Years	Team	Apps	(Gls)
2009	Tobago United		(0)
2010–2011	San Juan Jabloteh		(1)
2012	St. Ann's Rangers		(1)
2013–2016	Central		(6)
2014	→ Alpha United (loan)		
2016	Dragón		
2017	Pittsburgh Riverhounds	28	(1)
2018–2019	Colorado Springs Switchbacks	50	(1)
2020	Jocoro	6	(0)
2020	Sacachispas	13	(1)
2022–	KFK Kópavogur		
2023–2025	Club Sando		
2025–	Central		

International career
2012–	Trinidad and Tobago	6	(1)
- * Club domestic league appearances and goals as of 25 October 2019

Jamal Jack (born December 17, 1987) is a Trinidadian footballer who last played as a centre-back for Central.

== Club career ==
Jack started his career in his native island of Tobago with Tobago United. In 2010, he moved to the main island of Trinidad to play with San Juan Jabloteh, and later on with St. Ann's Rangers and with Central. He also had a brief loan spell with Alpha United in 2014 to play 2014–15 CONCACAF Champions League against Portland Timbers and C.D. Olimpia.

In July 2016, Jack joined CD Dragon in El Salvador while also playing the 2016–17 CONCACAF Champions League against Saprissa and once again Portland Timbers. He was so spotted by Pittsburgh Riverhounds which he joined in January 2017, going on to play 28 matches for the USL side. In 2018, Jack moved to Colorado Springs Switchbacks where he made 50 appearances over two seasons. He was included in the Colorado Springs Switchbacks Best XI from the club's first five seasons.

In January 2020, he joined Jocoro in El Salvador.

In August 2020, he joined Sacachispas in Guatemala.

== International career ==
Jack made his international debut on 29 February 2012 against Antigua and Barbuda, which his team won 4–0.

On 17 December 2024, which was his birthday, he scored his first international goal in a 3–1 friendly defeat to Saudi Arabia.

== Personal life ==
Jack was born in Charlotteville, a village lying on the northeastern tip of Tobago. He is father of two children.

== Career statistics ==
Goal	Date	Venue	Opponent	Score	Result	Competition
1.	17 December 2024	Al-Shabab Club Stadium, Riyadh, Saudi Arabia	Saudi Arabia	1–3	1–3	Friendly
