= Stephen Okai =

Ghanaian footballer (born 1989)

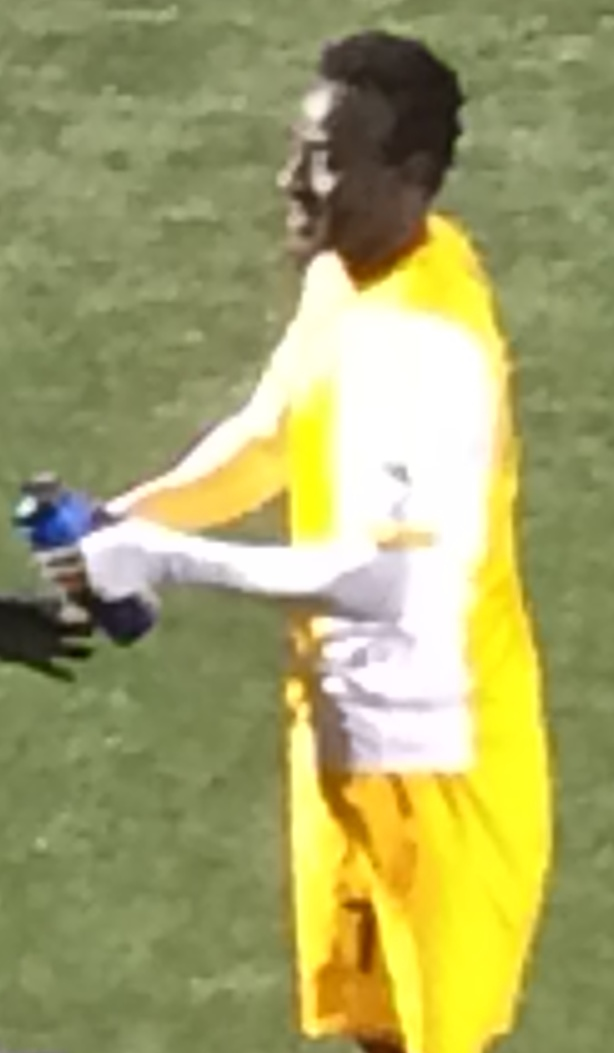
- Okai in 2015 on his Riverhounds debut

Personal information
- Date of birth: 27 September 1989 (age 37)
- Place of birth: Accra, Ghana
- Height: 1.70 m (5 ft 7 in)
- Position: Midfielder

College career
Years	Team	Apps	(Gls)
2009–2012	Mobile Rams		

Senior career*
Years	Team	Apps	(Gls)
2010	Des Moines Menace	15	(2)
2011–2012	Reading United	28	(5)
2013	Charlotte Eagles	27	(4)
2014	Orange County Blues	26	(2)
2015–2017	Pittsburgh Riverhounds	69	(1)

Managerial career
- 2018–: Pittsburgh Riverhounds academy
- * Club domestic league appearances and goals

Stephen Okai (born 27 September 1989) is a Ghanaian football coach and former player.

== Playing career ==
=== College and amateur ===
Okai played four years of college soccer at the University of Mobile. Okai won the National Player of the Year award in NAIA and was a three-time All-American.

During his time at college, Okai also played for USL PDL club Des Moines Menace in 2010, and Reading United A.C. in 2011 and 2012.

=== Professional career ===
On 17 January 2013, Okai was selected 31st overall in the 2013 MLS SuperDraft by Philadelphia Union. He trialed with the club, but was released by Philadelphia on 22 February 2013.

Okai signed with USL Pro club Charlotte Eagles in April 2013. He made his pro debut on 13 April 2013, in a 2–0 victory over Antigua Barracuda FC.

Okai signed with USL Pro side Pittsburgh Riverhounds in January 2015. On 30 November 2017, the club announced that Okai's contract had expired. He departed Pittsburgh after three seasons with the Riverhounds and retired.

== Coaching career ==
On 18 May 2018, Okai joined the coaching staff for the Riverhounds Development Academy.
