= Alejandro Aguilar (footballer) =

Costa Rican footballer (born 1990)

Personal information
- Full name: Alejandro Jesus Aguilar Bolaños
- Date of birth: 10 October 1990 (age 36)
- Place of birth: Costa Rica
- Height: 1.75 m (5 ft 9 in)
- Position: Forward

Team information
- Current team: Sporting AZ FC

Youth career
- 2010–2011: L.D. Alajuelense

Senior career*
Years	Team	Apps	(Gls)
2011–2016	Alajuelense	50	(7)
2012–2013	→ Carmelita (loan)	20	(10)
2015–2016	→ Cartaginés (loan)	15	(2)
2016	→ Carmelita (loan)	20	(6)
2016	Pittsburgh Riverhounds	9	(0)
2017	FC Arizona		
2018–	Sporting AZ		

International career^{‡}
2013	Costa Rica	1	(0)
- * Club domestic league appearances and goals as of 26 September 2016 ‡ National team caps and goals as of 1 January 2014

Alejandro Jesus Aguilar Bolaños (born 10 October 1990) is a Costa Rican footballer who plays as a forward for FC Arizona.

== Club career ==
Aguilar made his professional debut for Alajuelense in January 2011 against Cartaginés and had a loan spell at Carmelita in 2012/13 but returned to Alajuelense in summer 2013.

In July 2016 it was announced that Aguilar had signed a 1-year contract with the Pittsburgh Riverhounds of the USL with a club option for an additional year.

== International career ==
Aguilar made his debut for Costa Rica in a May 2013 friendly match against Canada, which has remained his sole international game by January 2014.
