= 2015 Columbus Crew SC season =

Columbus Crew SC
2015 season
- Investor-operators: Anthony Precourt
- Head Coach: Gregg Berhalter
- Stadium: MAPFRE Stadium
- Major League Soccer: Conference: 2nd Overall: 4th
- MLS Cup playoffs: Eastern conference champions
- U.S. Open Cup: Round of 16
- Top goalscorer: League: Kei Kamara (22); All: Kei Kamara (25)
- Highest home attendance: 22,719 (9/26 v. POR)
- Lowest home attendance: 10,302 (3/22 v. NY)
- Average home league attendance: 17,155 (85.9%)
- Biggest win: CLB 5–0 DC (10/25)
- Biggest defeat: PHI 3-0 CLB (6/3); MTL 3-0 CLB (7/11); ORL 5-2 CLB (8/1); CLB 3–0 DAL (9/6)
Home colors	Away colors

The 2015 Columbus Crew SC season was the club's 20th season of existence and their 20th consecutive season in Major League Soccer, the top flight of soccer in the United States and Canada. The first match of the season was on March 7 against Houston Dynamo. It was the second season under head coach Gregg Berhalter. The Crew's USL Pro affiliate this season was Austin Aztex.

== Review ==
In coach Berhalter's second season, he led the club to an MLS Cup appearance that resulted in a loss to the Portland Timbers. This season also saw returning striker Kei Kamara contend for the league's golden boot.

== Roster ==
As of August 28, 2015

Note: Flags indicate national team as defined under FIFA eligibility rules; some limited exceptions apply. Players may hold more than one non-FIFA nationality.

No.	Pos.	Nation	Player
1	GK	USA	Steve Clark
2	DF	USA	Tyson Wahl
3	DF	USA	Chris Klute
4	DF	USA	Michael Parkhurst (Captain)
5	DF	AUT	Emanuel Pogatetz (INT)
6	MF	CMR	Tony Tchani
7	MF	ISL	Kristinn Steindórsson (INT)
8	MF	ERI	Mohammed Saeid (INT)
9	FW	IRQ	Justin Meram
10	FW	ARG	Federico Higuaín (DP)
11	MF	COD	Cedrick Mabwati (INT)
12	MF	TTO	Kevan George (SUP)
13	MF	USA	Ethan Finlay
14	DF	CRC	Waylon Francis (INT)

No.	Pos.	Nation	Player
16	MF	USA	Hector Jiménez
17	FW	USA	Ben Speas (HGP)
18	FW	USA	Aaron Schoenfeld (SUP)
20	MF	USA	Wil Trapp (HGP)
21	DF	USA	Chad Barson (HGP; SUP)
22	DF	ARG	Gastón Sauro (INT)
23	FW	SLE	Kei Kamara
25	DF	GHA	Harrison Afful (INT)
26	MF	USA	Ben Swanson (HGP; SUP)
28	GK	USA	Matt Lampson (HGP; SUP)
30	FW	USA	Jack McInerney
41	GK	USA	Brad Stuver (SUP)

=== Out on loan ===
Note: Flags indicate national team as defined under FIFA eligibility rules; some limited exceptions apply. Players may hold more than one non-FIFA nationality.

No.	Pos.	Nation	Player
19	MF	USA	Romain Gall (SUP) (on loan to Austin Aztex)
24	DF	JAM	Sergio Campbell (INT; SUP) (on loan to Austin Aztex)

== Technical Staff ==
Position	Staff
President, Precourt Sports Ventures	(United States) Dave Greeley
President of Business Operations	(United States) Andy Loughnane
Director of Soccer Operations	(United States) Asher Mendelsohn
Sporting Director/Head Coach	(United States) Gregg Berhalter
Assistant Coach	(Finland) Sixten Boström
Assistant Coach	(Canada) Pat Onstad
Assistant Coach	(United States) Josh Wolff
High Performance Director	(United States) Steve Tashjian
Strength/Conditioning Coach	(United States) Brook Hamilton
Director of Team Operations	(United States) Tucker Walther
Equipment Manager	(United States) John Velasco
Team Operations Assistant	(United States) Ron Meadors
Head Athletic Trainer	(United States) Craig Devine
Assistant Trainer	(United States) Jon MacGregor

Source: []

== Non-competitive ==
=== Preseason ===
The Crew started preseason in Columbus and played games in Texas and Florida before returning to Ohio.

Unsigned draft picks Sergio Campbell, Sagi Lev-Ari, Tomas Gomez and Kalen Ryden joined the team for preseason.

February 13 ATX Pro Challenge	FC Dallas	3–1	Columbus Crew SC	Austin, TX
1:00 PM EST	Perez 30'; Hollingshead 38', 44'; Harris (yellow card) 43'; Toja (yellow card) 72'	Report	Kamara (yellow card) 29'; Parkhurst (yellow card) 45'; Tchani (yellow card) 60'; Steindórsson 65'	Stadium: Mike A. Myers Stadium; Referee: Ismail Elfath; Assistant referees: James Conlee; C. Oscar Mitchell; Fourth official: Nima Saghafi

February 15 ATX Pro Challenge	Austin Aztex	0–1	Columbus Crew SC	Austin, TX
1:00 PM EST	Guaraci (yellow card) 34'; Mulamba 55'	Report	Trapp (yellow card) 38'; Barson 81'	Stadium: Mike A. Myers Stadium; Referee: Hilario Grajeda; Assistant referees: Claudio Badea; Ian Chapman; Fourth official: Younes Marrakchi
Note: Third-place match

February 18 IMG Suncoast Pro Classic	Columbus Crew SC	7–0	London United	Bradenton, FL
	Kamara 3', 31'; Finlay 19'; Grana 21', 36'; Klute 45'; Lev-Ari 84'	Report		Stadium: IMG Academy Stadium
Note: London United are composed of players who are currently out of contract and are searching for professional clubs. They replace Congolese side TP Mazembe in the tournament.

February 21 IMG Suncoast Pro Classic	Columbus Crew SC	2–0	Costa Rica U-23	Bradenton, FL
5:00 PM EST	Kamara 16'; Higuaín 18'	Report	Clark (yellow card) 5' (yellow-red card) 39'	Stadium: IMG Academy Stadium; Referee: Kris Tencil

February 25 IMG Suncoast Pro Classic	Columbus Crew SC	1–1 (3–5 p)	Philadelphia Union	Bradenton, FL
5:00 PM EST	Steindórsson (yellow card) 39'; Meram 68'	Report	Aristeguieta 27'; Williams (yellow card) 39'	Stadium: IMG Academy Stadium; Referee: Fotis Bazakos; Assistant referees: Richard Gamache; Abdul Kuttaineh
	Penalties
	Wahl (penalty scored); Schoenfeld (penalty scored); Meram (penalty missed); Speas (penalty scored)		(penalty scored) Fabinho; (penalty scored) Fred; (penalty scored) Carroll; (penalty scored) Casey; (penalty scored) Lahoud

February 28 IMG Suncoast Pro Classic	Columbus Crew SC	4–1	Oklahoma City Energy FC	Bradenton, FL
5:00 PM EST	Steindórsson 32'; Finlay 34'; Higuaín 65'; Kamara 87'	Report	Gonzalez 78'	Stadium: IMG Academy Stadium
Note: Third-place match

=== Midseason ===
March 20 Friendly	Columbus Crew SC	6–1	Akron Zips	Columbus, OH
1:00 PM EDT	8'; 17'; 41'; 44'; 56'; 84'	Report	Holthusen 30'	Stadium: MAPFRE Stadium

March 29 Friendly	Columbus Crew SC	1–2	Louisville Cardinals	Columbus, OH
	Jiménez 44' (pen.)	Report	Kübel 42' (pen.); Brody 81'	Stadium: MAPFRE Stadium

April 19 Friendly	Columbus Crew SC	4–0	Bowling Green Falcons	Columbus, OH
10:30 AM EDT	Goal	Report

May 27 Friendly	Columbus Crew SC	0–1	Valencia CF	Columbus, OH
7:30 PM EDT	Pogatetz (yellow card) 85'	Report	Cancelo (yellow card) 21'; Augusto (yellow card) 28'; Negredo 33'	Stadium: MAPFRE Stadium

== Competitive ==
=== Overview ===
Competition	First match	Last match	Starting round	Final position	Record							
Competition	First match	Last match	Starting round	Final position	Pld	W	D	L	GF	GA	GD	Win %
Major League Soccer	March 7, 2015	October 25, 2015	Matchday 1	4th	34	15	8	11	58	53	+5	44.12
MLS Cup Playoffs	November 1, 2015	December 6, 2015	Conference Semifinals	Eastern Conference Champions	5	2	0	3	7	6	+1	40.00
U.S. Open Cup	June 17, 2015	June 30, 2015	Fourth Round	Round of 16	2	1	0	1	3	3	+0	50.00
Total					41	18	8	15	68	62	+6	43.90

Source: Competitions

=== MLS ===
==== Standings ====
===== Eastern Conference =====
Pos	Team	Pld	W	L	T	GF	GA	GD	Pts	Qualification
1	New York Red Bulls	34	18	10	6	62	43	+19	60	Qualification for the conference semifinals
2	Columbus Crew SC	34	15	11	8	58	53	+5	53	Qualification for the conference semifinals
3	Montreal Impact	34	15	13	6	48	44	+4	51	Qualification for the knockout round
4	D.C. United	34	15	13	6	43	45	−2	51	Qualification for the knockout round
5	New England Revolution	34	14	12	8	48	47	+1	50	Qualification for the knockout round

Source: MLS

===== Overall table =====
Pos	Team	Pld	W	L	T	GF	GA	GD	Pts	
2	FC Dallas	34	18	10	6	52	39	+13	60	Qualification for the CONCACAF Champions League
3	Vancouver Whitecaps FC (V)	34	16	13	5	45	36	+9	53	Qualification for the CONCACAF Champions League
4	Columbus Crew SC	34	15	11	8	58	53	+5	53	
5	Portland Timbers (C)	34	15	11	8	41	39	+2	53	Qualification for the CONCACAF Champions League
6	Seattle Sounders FC	34	15	13	6	44	36	+8	51	

Source: MLS
Rules for classification: 1) points; 2) total wins; 3) total goal differential; 4) total goals scored
(C) MLS Cup champions; (V) Canadian Championship winners

==== Results summary ====
Overall								Home						Away					
Pld	Pts	W	L	T	GF	GA	GD	W	L	T	GF	GA	GD	W	L	T	GF	GA	GD
34	53	15	11	8	58	53	+5	9	4	4	38	25	+13	6	7	4	20	28	−8

Last updated: 18 Nov 2015
Source: Columbus Crew
Pld = Matches played; Pts = Points; W = Matches won; T = Matches tied; L = Matches lost; GF = Goals for; GA = Goals against; GD = Goal difference

==== Results by round ====
Round	1	2	3	4	5	6	7	8	9	10	11	12	13	14	15	16	17	18	19	20	21	22	23	24	25	26	27	28	29	30	31	32	33	34
Stadium	A	H	H	A	A	H	H	A	H	A	H	A	A	H	H	H	A	H	A	A	H	H	A	A	H	H	A	H	A	A	H	A	A	H
Result	L	W	L	D	D	W	W	L	W	L	D	D	L	L	D	W	D	W	L	W	W	D	L	W	D	W	W	L	W	W	L	L	W	W

Updated to match(es) played on 18 November 2015. Source: columbuscrewsc.com
A = Away; H = Home; W = Win; D = Draw; L = Loss

==== Match results ====
March 7 1	Houston Dynamo	1–0	Columbus Crew SC	Houston, TX
8:30 PM EST	Barnes 66'	Report	Pogatetz (yellow card) 28'; Tchani (yellow card) 78'	Stadium: BBVA Compass Stadium; Attendance: 22,351; Referee: Allen Chapman; Assistant referees: Jeff Muschik; Jeremy Hanson; Fourth official: Younes Marrakchi

March 14 2	Columbus Crew SC	2–0	Toronto FC	Columbus, OH
7:30 PM EDT	Meram 57'; Kamara 61'; George (yellow card) 85'	Report	Morrow (red card) 45+1'	Stadium: MAPFRE Stadium; Attendance: 15,826; Referee: David Gantar; Assistant referees: James Conlee; Danny Thornberry; Fourth official: Sorin Stoica

March 28 3	Columbus Crew SC	1–2	New York Red Bulls	Columbus, OH
7:30 PM EDT	Higuaín (yellow card) 39' (yellow-red card) 83'; Tchani 58'	Report	Perrinelle (yellow card) 17'; Wright-Phillips 49' (pen.); Grella 67'; Duvall (yellow card) 90+4'	Stadium: MAPFRE Stadium; Attendance: 10,302; Referee: Sorin Stoica; Assistant referees: Anthony Vasoli; Jason White; Fourth official: Fotis Bazakos

April 8 4	Vancouver Whitecaps FC	2–2	Columbus Crew SC	Vancouver, BC
10:00 PM EDT	Waston (yellow card) 17'; Rivero 31'; Mattocks 64'	Report	Kamara 24', 50'; Jiménez (yellow card) 54'; Wahl (yellow card) 72'	Stadium: BC Place; Attendance: 18,083; Referee: Drew Fischer; Assistant referees: Frank Anderson; Marco Arruda; Fourth official: Baboucarr Jallow

April 11 5	New England Revolution	0–0	Columbus Crew SC	Foxborough, MA
3:00 PM EDT	Jones (yellow card) 12'; Agudelo (yellow card) 55'; Dorman (yellow card) 68'	Report	Tchani (yellow card) 62'; Higuaín (yellow card) 65'; Saeid (yellow card) 87'	Stadium: Gillette Stadium; Attendance: 13,092; Referee: Silviu Petrescu; Assistant referees: Claudiu Badea; Philippe Brière; Fourth official: Mathieu Bourdeau

April 18 6	Columbus Crew SC	3–0	Orlando City SC	Columbus, OH
7:30 PM EDT	Higuaín 32'; Grana (yellow card) 34'; Meram 55'; Kamara 60'	Report	Ramos (red card) 34'; Okugo (yellow card) 58'	Stadium: MAPFRE Stadium; Attendance: 15,655; Referee: Ricardo Salazar; Assistant referees: Gianni Facchini; Andrew Bigelow; Fourth official: Kevin Terry Jr.

April 25 7	Columbus Crew SC	4–1	Philadelphia Union	Columbus, OH
7:30 PM EDT	Kamara 21'; Finlay 32', 73'; Meram 44'	Report	Edu (yellow card) 24'; Lahoud (yellow card) 46'; Ayuk 64'	Stadium: MAPFRE Stadium; Attendance: 15,553; Referee: Chris Penso; Assistant referees: Greg Barkey; Mark Cahen; Fourth official: Mark Kadlecik

May 2 8	D.C. United	2–0	Columbus Crew SC	Washington, D.C.
7:00 PM EDT	Espindola 15', (yellow card) 71'; Franklin 41', (yellow card) 90'	Report		Stadium: Robert F. Kennedy Memorial Stadium; Attendance: 13,107; Referee: Baldomero Toledo; Assistant referees: Kermit Quisenberry; Kathryn Nesbitt; Fourth official: Edvin Jurisevic

May 9 9	Columbus Crew SC	3–2	Seattle Sounders FC	Columbus, OH
7:30 PM EDT	Kamara 10', 58', (yellow card) 77'; Pogatetz (yellow card) 44'; Higuaín 49'; Schoenfeld (yellow card) 90+1'	Report	Dempsey 24', 75'; Pineda (yellow card) 77'	Stadium: MAPFRE Stadium; Attendance: 16,714; Referee: Edvin Jurisevic; Assistant referees: James Conlee; Jonathan Johnson; Fourth official: Sorin Stoica

May 16 10	San Jose Earthquakes	2–0	Columbus Crew SC	San Jose, CA
10:30 PM EDT	Goodson (yellow card) 40'; García (yellow card) 45+2'; Wondolowski 55'; Salinas 60'	Report	Saeid (yellow card) 14' (yellow-red card) 33'; George (yellow card) 90+1'	Stadium: Avaya Stadium; Attendance: 18,000; Referee: Kevin Stott; Assistant referees: Jeff Hosking; Eric Weisbrod; Fourth official: Alejandro Mariscal

May 22 11	Columbus Crew SC	2–2	Chicago Fire	Columbus, OH
7:30 PM EDT	Kamara 8', 55'; George (yellow card) 21'; Meram (yellow card) 90+2'	Report	Gehrig (yellow card) 42'; Accam 58'; Johnson 90+4'	Stadium: MAPFRE Stadium; Attendance: 13,118; Referee: Fotis Bazakos; Assistant referees: Sean Hurd; Scott Kachmarik; Fourth official: Alan Kelly

May 30 12	Orlando City SC	2–2	Columbus Crew SC	Orlando, FL
7:30 PM EDT	Kaká 17' (pen.); Rivas (yellow card) 45+2'; Ribeiro 89'	Report	Tchani 6'; Parkhurst (red card) 16'; Meram (yellow card) 32'; Jiménez (yellow card) 40'; Kamara 61'; Saeid (yellow card) 90'; Francis (yellow card) 90+1'; Klute (yellow card) 90+1'	Stadium: Orlando Citrus Bowl Stadium; Attendance: 31,430; Referee: Silviu Petrescu; Assistant referees: Mark Cahen; Kyle Longville; Fourth official: Marcos de Oliveira

June 3 13	Philadelphia Union	3–0	Columbus Crew SC	Chester, PA
7:00 PM EDT	Sapong 41'; Nogueira 52'; Le Toux 58'; Ayuk (yellow card) 86'	Report	Jiménez (yellow card) 85'	Stadium: PPL Park; Attendance: 15,374; Referee: Jorge Gonzalez; Assistant referees: C.J. Morgante; Kathryn Nesbitt; Fourth official: Mark Kadlecik

June 6 14	Columbus Crew SC	1–2	Montreal Impact	Columbus, OH
7:30 PM EDT	Higuaín 90+1'	Report	Tissot 55'; Donadel (yellow card) 75'; Romero (yellow card) 78', (goal) 79'; Toia (yellow card) 87'; McInerney (yellow card) 90+3'	Stadium: MAPFRE Stadium; Attendance: 12,265; Referee: Ted Unkel; Assistant referees: Claudiu Badea; Peter Balciunas; Fourth official: Sorin Stoica

June 13 15	Columbus Crew SC	1–1	LA Galaxy	Columbus, OH
7:30 PM EDT	Higuaín 66'	Report	Lletget 14'; Gonzalez (yellow card) 70'; Rogers (yellow card) 87'	Stadium: MAPFRE Stadium; Attendance: 21,051; Referee: Robert Sibiga; Assistant referees: Greg Barkey; Brian Dunn; Fourth official: Jorge Gonzalez

June 24 16	Columbus Crew SC	2–1	New England Revolution	Columbus, OH
7:30 PM EDT	Kamara 4', 50', (yellow card) 95'; Parkhurst (yellow card) 63'; Pogatetz (yellow card) 79'; Francis (yellow card) 86'; Steindórsson (yellow card) 90'	Report	Nguyen 1'; Shuttleworth (yellow card) 50'; Dorman (yellow card) 93'	Stadium: MAPFRE Stadium; Attendance: 11,435; Referee: Fotis Bazakos; Assistant referees: Chris Strickland; Andrew Bigelow; Fourth official: Kevin Terry Jr.

June 27 17	Real Salt Lake	2–2	Columbus Crew SC	Sandy, UT
10:00 PM EDT	García 36'; Jaime 46'; Beltran (yellow card) 47'; Mulholland (yellow card) 59'; Sandoval (yellow card) 70'; Maund (yellow card) 76'; Allen (red card) 77'	Report	Tchani 42'; Finlay 62'; Francis (yellow card) 73'; Kamara (yellow card) 82'	Stadium: Rio Tinto Stadium; Attendance: 20,171; Referee: Ismail Elfath; Assistant referees: Frank Anderson; Eduardo Mariscal; Fourth official: Baboucarr Jallow

July 4 18	Columbus Crew SC	2–1	New York Red Bulls	Columbus, OH
7:30 PM EDT	Tchani (yellow card) 30'; Finlay 33', 74'	Report	Abang 8'; Perrinelle (yellow card) 55'; Felipe (yellow card) 90+4'	Stadium: MAPFRE Stadium; Attendance: 14,429; Referee: Juan Guzman; Assistant referees: Kermit Quisenberry; Kathryn Nesbitt; Fourth official: Mark Kadlecik

July 11 19	Montreal Impact	3–0	Columbus Crew SC	Montreal, QC
8:00 PM EDT	Oduro 5', 80'; Donadel 8'; Duka (yellow card) 24'; Oyongo (yellow card) 66'; Soumaré (yellow card) 86'	Report	Saeid (yellow card) 25'; Meram (yellow card) 55'	Stadium: Stade Saputo; Attendance: 15,304; Referee: Silviu Petrescu; Assistant referees: Joe Fletcher; Oscar Mitchell-Carvalho; Fourth official: Robert Sibiga

July 15 20	Chicago Fire	0–1	Columbus Crew SC	Bridgeview, IL
7:30 PM EDT	Ritter (yellow card) 46'; Gehrig (yellow card) 63'; Accam (yellow card) 90+5'	Report	Kamara 41'; Barson (yellow card) 77'; Clark (yellow card) 90+3'	Stadium: Toyota Park; Attendance: 14,092; Referee: Ted Unkel; Assistant referees: Ian Anderson; Anthony Vasoli; Fourth official: Fotis Bazakos

July 19 21	Columbus Crew SC	3–1	Chicago Fire	Columbus, OH
5:30 PM EDT	Higuaín 2'; Kamara 17'; Finlay 83'; Tchani (yellow card) 53'; Higuaín (yellow card) 65'	Report	Accam 9'; Johnson (yellow card) 35' (yellow-red card) 50'; Adailton (yellow card) 45+1'	Stadium: MAPFRE Stadium; Attendance: 15,455; Referee: Chris Penso; Assistant referees: Jeff Muschik; Scott Kachmarik; Fourth official: Alex Chilowicz

July 25 22	Columbus Crew SC	3–3	Toronto FC	Columbus, OH
7:30 PM EDT	Kamara 17', (yellow card) 69'; Tchani 36'; Finlay 47'; Francis (yellow card) 88'	Report	Perquis (yellow card) 20'; Giovinco 50', (yellow card) 85'; Warner 55', (yellow card) 76'; Altidore 89' (pen.)	Stadium: MAPFRE Stadium; Attendance: 21,324; Referee: Fotis Bazakos; Assistant referees: Brian Poeschel; Peter Balciunas; Fourth official: Tyler Ploeger

August 1 23	Orlando City SC	5–2	Columbus Crew SC	Orlando, FL
7:30 PM EDT	Larin 18', 53'; Cerén 38'; Collin 77'; Higuita 84'; Hines (yellow card) 63'	Report	Higuaín 5'; Francis (yellow card) 74'; Saeid (yellow card) 82'; Collin 90+1' (o.g.)	Stadium: Orlando Citrus Bowl Stadium; Attendance: 26,586; Referee: Ricardo Salazar; Assistant referees: Chris Strickland; Kevin Klinger; Fourth official: Marcos de Oliveira

August 8 24	Colorado Rapids	1–2	Columbus Crew SC	Commerce City, CO
9:00 PM EDT	Doyle (yellow card) 7'; Watts (yellow card) 30'; Burling 42'; Sjöberg (yellow card) 50' (yellow-red card) 90'; Burch (yellow card) 61'	Report	Kamara 52', 64'; Klute (yellow card) 67'; Barson (yellow card) 73'; Higuaín (yellow card) 90+2'	Stadium: Dick's Sporting Goods Park; Attendance: 16,676; Referee: Alan Kelly; Assistant referees: Matt Nelson; T.J. Zablocki; Fourth official: Younes Marrakchi

August 19 25	Columbus Crew SC	2–2	New York City FC	Columbus, OH
7:30 PM EDT	Kamara 24'; Cedrick 72'	Report	Villa (yellow card) 51'; Poku 57', 66'; Saunders (yellow card) 90+3'; Iraola (yellow card) 90+4'	Stadium: MAPFRE Stadium; Attendance: 15,514; Referee: Allen Chapman; Assistant referees: Eric Boria; Jeremy Hanson; Fourth official: Sorin Stoica

August 22 26	Columbus Crew SC	3–2	Sporting Kansas City	Columbus, OH
7:30 PM EDT	Finlay 35'; Tchani 80'; McInerney 88', (yellow card) 90+2'	Report	de Jong 14'; Dwyer (yellow card) 33'; Medranda (yellow card) 39'; Zusi 62'; Lopez (yellow card) 79'	Stadium: MAPFRE Stadium; Attendance: 20,018; Referee: Chris Penso; Assistant referees: Jeff Muschik; Andrew Bigelow; Fourth official: Kevin Terry Jr.

August 29 27	New York City FC	1–2	Columbus Crew SC	New York, NY
4:00 PM EDT	Higuaín 10'; Tchani (yellow card) 59'; Kamara (yellow card) 82'; Meram 83'	Report	Jacobson 29'	Stadium: Yankee Stadium; Attendance: 30,018; Referee: Juan Guzman; Assistant referees: C.J. Morgante; Scott Kachmarik; Fourth official: Robert Sibiga

September 6 28	Columbus Crew SC	0–3	FC Dallas	Columbus, OH
7:00 PM EDT		Report	Harris 27'; Gonzalez (yellow card) 63'; Barrios 69'; Texeira 71'	Stadium: MAPFRE Stadium; Attendance: 20,217; Referee: Baldomero Toledo; Assistant referees: Adam Garner; Kermit Quisenberry; Fourth official: Sorin Stoica

September 12 29	Philadelphia Union	1–2	Columbus Crew SC	Chester, PA
7:30 PM EDT	Sapong 66'; Vitória (yellow card) 86'	Report	Kamara 21', 26'; Clark (yellow card) 90'	Stadium: PPL Park; Attendance: 17,283; Referee: Jose Carlos Rivero; Assistant referees: Corey Parker; Oscar Mitchell-Carvalho; Fourth official: Marcos de Oliveira

September 19 30	D.C. United	1–2	Columbus Crew SC	Washington, D.C.
7:00 PM EDT	Birnbaum (yellow card) 51'; Kitchen (yellow card) 62'; Rolfe 68'; Kemp (yellow card) 90+2'	Report	Finlay 27'; Kamara 49'; Klute (yellow card) 72'	Stadium: Robert F. Kennedy Memorial Stadium; Attendance: 19,033; Referee: Ted Unkel; Assistant referees: Peter Manikowski; Richard Gamache; Fourth official: Fotis Bazakos

September 26 31	Columbus Crew SC	1–2	Portland Timbers	Columbus, OH
7:30 PM EDT	Kamara 43'; Higuaín (yellow card) 88'	Report	Adi 28', 50'; Chara (yellow card) 45+1'; Fochive (yellow card) 90+2'; Adam Larsen Kwarasey (yellow card) 90+5'	Stadium: MAPFRE Stadium; Attendance: 22,719; Referee: Silviu Petrescu; Assistant referees: Craig Lowry; Kathryn Nesbitt; Fourth official: Nima Saghafi

October 3 32	New York Red Bulls	2–1	Columbus Crew SC	Harrison, NJ
7:00 PM EDT	Sam 12'; Perrinelle (yellow card) 15'; Robles (yellow card) 78'; Wright-Phillips 21'	Report	Meram 9'; Sauro (yellow card) 79'	Stadium: Red Bull Arena; Attendance: 21,715; Referee: Alan Kelly; Assistant referees: Matt Nelson; Peter Balciunas; Fourth official: Daniel Fitzgerald

October 17 33	Toronto FC	0–2	Columbus Crew SC	Toronto, ON
2:00 PM EDT	Bradley (yellow card) 42'; Cheyrou (yellow card) 73'	Report	Higuaín (yellow card) 31', (goal) 90+1'; Finlay 40'; Kamara (yellow card) 63'; Sauro (yellow card) 85'; Parkhurst (yellow card) 87'	Stadium: BMO Field; Attendance: 24,253; Referee: Chris Penso; Assistant referees: Joe Fletcher; Philippe Brière; Fourth official: Mathieu Bourdeau

October 25 34	Columbus Crew SC	5–0	D.C. United	Columbus, OH
5:00 PM EDT	McInerney 25', (yellow card) 59'; Meram 54'; Finlay 66', 67'; Schoenfeld 80'	Report	Kemp (yellow card) 58'	Stadium: MAPFRE Stadium; Attendance: 19,121; Referee: Ismail Elfath; Assistant referees: Ian Anderson; Kevin Klinger; Fourth official: Silviu Petrescu

=== MLS Cup Playoffs ===
==== Conference Semifinals ====
November 1 Leg 1	Montreal Impact	2–1	Columbus Crew SC	Montreal, QC
7:00 PM EST	Bernier 37'; Cabrera (yellow card) 45+2'; Oyongo (yellow card) 51'; Venegas 77'; Drogba (yellow card) 87'	Report	Higuaín 33'; Sauro (yellow card) 52'; Afful (yellow card) 90+3'	Stadium: Stade Saputo; Attendance: 17,655; Referee: Chris Penso; Assistant referees: Jeff Muschik; James Conlee; Fourth official: José Carlos Rivero

November 8 Leg 2	Columbus Crew SC	3–1 (a.e.t.) (4–3 agg.)	Montreal Impact	Columbus, OH
7:30 PM EST	Kamara 4', 111'; Sauro (yellow card) 30'; Finlay 77'	Report	Duka 40'; Donadel (yellow card) 85'; Camara (yellow card) 90+5'; Reo-Coker (yellow card) 104'	Stadium: MAPFRE Stadium; Attendance: 19,026; Referee: Armando Villarreal; Assistant referees: Corey Parker; Craig Lowry; Fourth official: Jorge Gonzalez

==== Conference Finals ====
November 22 Leg 1	Columbus Crew SC	2–0	New York Red Bulls	Columbus, OH
5:00 PM EST	Meram 1'; Wahl (yellow card) 46'; Kamara 85'	Report		Stadium: MAPFRE Stadium; Attendance: 21,617; Referee: Allen Chapman; Assistant referees: George Gansner; Jeff Muschik; Fourth official: Mark Geiger

November 29 Leg 2	New York Red Bulls	1–0 (1–2 agg.)	Columbus Crew SC	Harrison, NJ
7:30 PM EST	Felipe (yellow card) 28'; Zizzo (yellow card) 85'; Abang 90+3'	Report	Sauro (yellow card) 67'	Stadium: Red Bull Arena; Attendance: 25,219; Referee: Baldomero Toledo; Assistant referees: Frank Anderson; Greg Barkey; Fourth official: Sorin Stoica

==== MLS Cup ====
December 6 MLS Cup	Columbus Crew SC	1–2	Portland Timbers	Columbus, OH
4:00 PM EST	Kamara 18'; Afful (yellow card) 34'	Report	Valeri 1'; Wallace 7'; Powell (yellow card) 65'; Valeri (yellow card) 90+3'; Asprilla (yellow card) 90+3'	Stadium: MAPFRE Stadium; Attendance: 21,747; Referee: Jair Marrufo; Assistant referees: Peter Manikowski; Corey Parker; Fourth official: Chris Penso

=== U.S. Open Cup ===
June 17, 2015 Fourth Round	Richmond Kickers (Virginia)	1–3	(Ohio) Columbus Crew SC	Richmond, VA
7:00 PM EDT	Sekyere 23'	Report	Bedell 17', 63'; Tchani (yellow card) 35'; Finlay 42'	Stadium: City Stadium; Attendance: 4,040; Referee: Kevin Terry Jr. Assistant referees: Charles Carson; Hagen Barnett

June 30, 2015 Round of 16	Orlando City SC (Florida)	2–0	(Ohio) Columbus Crew SC	Orlando, FL
7:30 PM EDT	Higuita (yellow card) 12'; Hines (yellow card) 14'; Kaká 21'; Rivas 35'	Report	George (yellow card) 24'; Schoenfeld (yellow card) 39'; Pogatetz (yellow card) 53'	Stadium: Orlando Citrus Bowl Stadium; Attendance: 13,684; Referee: Mark Kadlecik; Assistant referees: Gregory Barker; Jose Da Silva; Fourth official: Matthew McCannon

== Statistics ==
=== Appearances and goals ===
Under "Apps" for each section, the first number represents the number of starts, and the second number represents appearances as a substitute.

No.	Pos	Nat	Player	Total		MLS		MLS Cup Playoffs		U.S. Open Cup	
No.	Pos	Nat	Player	Apps	Goals	Apps	Goals	Apps	Goals	Apps	Goals
1	GK	(United States) USA	Steve Clark	39	0	34+0	0	5+0	0	0+0	0
2	DF	(United States) USA	Tyson Wahl	23	0	14+4	0	1+2	0	2+0	0
3	DF	(United States) USA	Chris Klute	17	0	8+6	0	0+2	0	1+0	0
4	DF	(United States) USA	Michael Parkhurst	38	0	33+0	0	5+0	0	0+0	0
5	DF	(Austria) AUT	Emanuel Pogatetz	21	0	16+3	0	0+0	0	2+0	0
6	MF	(Cameroon) CMR	Tony Tchani	39	5	32+0	5	5+0	0	2+0	0
7	MF	(Iceland) ISL	Kristinn Steindórsson	23	0	4+17	0	0+0	0	2+0	0
8	MF	(Eritrea) ERI	Mohammed Saeid	21	7	18+0	7	0+2	0	0+1	0
9	FW	(Iraq) IRQ	Justin Meram	38	7	28+3	6	5+0	1	0+2	0
10	FW	(Argentina) ARG	Federico Higuaín	37	9	32+0	8	5+0	1	0+0	0
11	MF	(Democratic Republic of the Congo) COD	Cedrick Mabwati	13	1	1+8	1	0+4	0	0+0	0
12	MF	(Trinidad and Tobago) TTO	Kevan George	10	0	2+4	0	0+2	0	2+0	0
13	MF	(United States) USA	Ethan Finlay	40	14	34+0	12	5+0	1	1+0	1
14	DF	(Costa Rica) CRC	Waylon Francis	33	0	28+0	0	5+0	0	0+0	0
16	MF	(United States) USA	Hector Jiménez	24	0	12+11	0	0+0	0	1+0	0
17	FW	(United States) USA	Ben Speas	10	0	2+6	0	0+0	0	2+0	0
18	FW	(United States) USA	Aaron Schoenfeld	19	1	1+16	1	0+0	0	1+1	0
19	MF	(United States) USA	Romain Gall	1	0	0+0	0	0+0	0	0+1	0
20	MF	(United States) USA	Wil Trapp	25	0	17+2	0	5+0	0	0+1	0
21	DF	(United States) USA	Chad Barson	12	0	4+6	0	0+0	0	2+0	0
22	DF	(Argentina) ARG	Gastón Sauro	8	0	4+0	0	4+0	0	0+0	0
23	FW	(Sierra Leone) SLE	Kei Kamara	37	26	31+1	22	5+0	4	0+0	0
24	DF	(Jamaica) JAM	Sergio Campbell	1	0	1+0	0	0+0	0	0+0	0
25	DF	(Ghana) GHA	Harrison Afful	14	0	9+0	0	5+0	0	0+0	0
26	DF	(United States) USA	Ben Swanson	0	0	0+0	0	0+0	0	0+0	0
28	GK	(United States) USA	Matt Lampson	0	0	0+0	0	0+0	0	0+0	0
30	FW	(United States) USA	Jack McInerney	7	2	2+3	2	0+2	0	0+0	0
41	GK	(United States) USA	Brad Stuver	2	0	0+0	0	0+0	0	2+0	0
			Own goal	0	1	-	1	-	0	-	0
Players who left Columbus during the season:
22	DF	(United States) USA	Kalen Ryden	0	0	0+0	0	0+0	0	0+0	0
25	FW	(Israel) ISR	Sagi Lev-Ari	0	0	0+0	0	0+0	0	0+0	0
27	DF	(Argentina) ARG	Hernán Grana	7	0	7+0	0	0+0	0	0+0	0
29	FW	(United States) USA	Adam Bedell	2	2	0+0	0	0+0	0	2+0	2

=== Disciplinary record ===
No.	Pos.	Name	MLS		MLS Cup Playoffs		U.S. Open Cup		Total	
No.	Pos.	Name	Yellow card	Red card	Yellow card	Red card	Yellow card	Red card	Yellow card	Red card
1	GK	(United States) Steve Clark	2	0	0	0	0	0	2	0
2	DF	(United States) Tyson Wahl	1	0	1	0	0	0	2	0
3	DF	(United States) Chris Klute	3	0	0	0	0	0	3	0
4	DF	(United States) Michael Parkhurst	2	1	0	0	0	0	2	1
5	DF	(Austria) Emanuel Pogatetz	3	0	0	0	1	0	4	0
6	MF	(Cameroon) Tony Tchani	5	0	0	0	1	0	6	0
7	MF	(Iceland) Kristinn Steindórsson	1	0	0	0	0	0	1	0
8	MF	(Eritrea) Mohammed Saeid	4	1	0	0	0	0	4	1
9	FW	(Iraq) Justin Meram	3	0	0	0	0	0	3	0
10	FW	(Argentina) Federico Higuaín	5	1	0	0	0	0	5	1
11	MF	(Democratic Republic of the Congo) Cedrick Mabwati	0	0	0	0	0	0	0	0
12	MF	(Trinidad and Tobago) Kevan George	3	0	0	0	1	0	4	0
13	MF	(United States) Ethan Finlay	0	0	0	0	0	0	0	0
14	DF	(Costa Rica) Waylon Francis	5	0	0	0	0	0	5	0
16	MF	(United States) Hector Jiménez	3	0	0	0	0	0	3	0
17	FW	(United States) Ben Speas	0	0	0	0	0	0	0	0
18	FW	(United States) Aaron Schoenfeld	1	0	0	0	1	0	2	0
19	MF	(United States) Romain Gall	0	0	0	0	0	0	0	0
20	MF	(United States) Wil Trapp	0	0	0	0	0	0	0	0
21	DF	(United States) Chad Barson	2	0	0	0	0	0	2	0
22	DF	(Argentina) Gastón Sauro	2	0	3	0	0	0	5	0
23	FW	(Sierra Leone) Kei Kamara	6	0	0	0	0	0	6	0
24	DF	(Jamaica) Sergio Campbell	0	0	0	0	0	0	0	0
25	DF	(Ghana) Harrison Afful	0	0	2	0	0	0	2	0
26	MF	(United States) Ben Swanson	0	0	0	0	0	0	0	0
28	GK	(Argentina) Matt Lampson	0	0	0	0	0	0	0	0
30	FW	(United States) Jack McInerney	2	0	0	0	0	0	2	0
41	GK	(United States) Brad Stuver	0	0	0	0	0	0	0	0
Players who left Columbus during the season:
22	DF	(United States) Kalen Ryden	0	0	0	0	0	0	0	0
25	FW	(Israel) Sagi Lev-Ari	0	0	0	0	0	0	0	0
27	DF	(Argentina) Hernán Grana	1	0	0	0	0	0	1	0
29	FW	(United States) Adam Bedell	0	0	0	0	0	0	0	0

=== Clean sheets ===
No.	Name	MLS	MLS Cup Playoffs	U.S. Open Cup	Total	Games Played		
No.	Name	1	(United States) Steve Clark	6	1	0	7	39
28	(United States) Matt Lampson	0	0	0	0	0		
41	(United States) Brad Stuver	0	0	0	0	2		

== Transfers ==
=== In ===
Position	Player	Transferred from	Fee/notes	Date	Source
DF	(United States) Chris Klute	(United States) Colorado Rapids	Traded for a first round draft pick in the 2015 MLS SuperDraft	January 16, 2015	
DF	(Argentina) Hernan Grana	(Argentina) All Boys	Signed via discovery	January 23, 2015	
MF	(Democratic Republic of the Congo) Cedrick Mabwati	(Spain) Real Betis	Transfer, terms undisclosed	January 30, 2015	
DF	(Jamaica) Sergio Campbell	(United States) Connecticut Huskies	Drafted in round 1 of the 2015 MLS SuperDraft	March 2, 2015	
FW	(Israel) Sagi Lev-Ari	(United States) Cal State Northridge Matadors	Drafted in round 2 of the 2015 MLS SuperDraft	March 2, 2015	
DF	(United States) Kalen Ryden	(United States) Midwestern State Mustangs	Drafted in round 4 of the 2015 MLS SuperDraft	March 2, 2015	
DF	(Ghana) Harrison Afful	(Tunisia) ES Tunis	Signed via discovery	July 30, 2015	
FW	(United States) Jack McInerney	(Canada) Montreal Impact	Traded for a second round draft pick in the 2016 MLS SuperDraft	August 4, 2015	
DF	(Argentina) Gastón Sauro	(Switzerland) FC Basel	Signed via discovery	August 6, 2015	
DF	(United States) Corey Ashe	(United States) Orlando City SC	Signed as a free agent.	December 18, 2015	

=== Out ===
Pos.	Player	Transferred to	Fee/notes	Date	Source
DF	(United States) Ben Sweat	(United States) Tampa Bay Rowdies	Placed on waivers	February 9, 2015	
FW	(Israel) Sagi Lev-Ari	Retired	Placed on waivers	March 16, 2015	
DF	(Argentina) Hernán Grana	(Argentina) All Boys	Mutually agreed to terminate contract	May 12, 2015	
DF	(United States) Kalen Ryden	(United States) Oklahoma City Energy FC	Placed on waivers	August 6, 2015	
FW	(United States) Adam Bedell	(United States) Orlando City SC	Traded for a second round draft pick in the 2016 MLS SuperDraft	August 6, 2015	
DF	(Austria) Emanuel Pogatetz	(Germany) 1. FC Union Berlin	Option declined	December 7, 2015	
MF	(Iceland) Kristinn Steindórsson	(Sweden) GIF Sundsvall	Option declined	December 7, 2015	
MF	(United States) Ben Speas	(United States) Minnesota United	Contract expired	December 7, 2015	
GK	(United States) Matt Lampson	(United States) Chicago Fire	Contract expired	December 7, 2015	
MF	(Trinidad and Tobago) Kevan George	(United States) Jacksonville Armada	Contract expired	December 7, 2015	
FW	(United States) Jack McInerney	(United States) Portland Timbers	Contract expired; rights traded for targeted allocation money and general allocation money	December 7, 2015	
FW	(United States) Aaron Schoenfeld	(Israel) Maccabi Netanya F.C.	Contract expired	December 7, 2015	
DF	(United States) Chris Klute	(United States) Portland Timbers	Traded for general allocation money	December 11, 2015	

=== Loans out ===
Pos.	Player	Loanee club	Length/Notes	Beginning	End	Source
MF	(Democratic Republic of the Congo) Cedrick Mabwati	(Spain) CA Osasuna	Signed, then loaned through the remainder of the season	January 30, 2015	July 6, 2015	
DF	(United States) Kalen Ryden	(United States) Austin Aztex	Columbus retains right to recall at any time	March 26, 2015	August 6, 2015	
FW	(United States) Adam Bedell	(United States) Austin Aztex	Columbus retains right to recall at any time	May 1, 2015	End of Season	
MF	(United States) Romain Gall	(United States) Austin Aztex	Columbus retains right to recall at any time	July 9, 2015	End of Season	
MF	(Jamaica) Sergio Campbell	(United States) Austin Aztex	Columbus retains right to recall at any time	September 8, 2015	End of Season	

=== MLS Draft picks ===
Draft picks are not automatically signed to the team roster. Only those who are signed to a contract will be listed as transfers in. The picks for the Columbus Crew are listed below:

2015 Columbus Crew SC SuperDraft Picks
Round	Pick	Player	Position	College
1	19	(Jamaica) Sergio Campbell	DF	Connecticut
2	35	(Israel) Sagi Lev-Ari	FW	Cal State Northridge
3	55	(Bosnia and Herzegovina) Robert Kristo	FW	Saint Louis
3	60	(United States) Tomas Gomez	GK	Georgetown
4	69	(United States) Kalen Ryden	DF	Midwestern State Mustangs

== Awards ==
MLS Team of the Week
Week	Starters	Bench	Opponent(s)	Link
2	(Argentina) Hernán Grana (Iraq) Justin Meram		(Canada) Toronto FC	
7	(Argentina) Federico Higuaín (Sierra Leone) Kei Kamara		(United States) Orlando City SC	
8	(Costa Rica) Waylon Francis (United States) Ethan Finlay (Sierra Leone) Kei Kamara (United States) Gregg Berhalter (Coach)		(United States) Philadelphia Union	
10	(Austria) Emanuel Pogatetz (Argentina) Federico Higuaín (Sierra Leone) Kei Kamara	(United States) Hector Jiménez	(United States) Seattle Sounders FC	
12	(Sierra Leone) Kei Kamara		(United States) Chicago Fire	
13		(Sierra Leone) Kei Kamara	(United States) Orlando City SC	
15	(Cameroon) Tony Tchani		(United States)	
17	(United States) Ethan Finlay (Sierra Leone) Kei Kamara		(United States) New England Revolution (United States) Real Salt Lake	
18	(United States) Ethan Finlay (Sierra Leone) Kei Kamara	(Cameroon) Tony Tchani	(United States) New York Red Bulls	
20	(Costa Rica) Waylon Francis (United States) Ethan Finlay (Sierra Leone) Kei Kamara (United States) Gregg Berhalter (Coach)		(United States) Chicago Fire	
21		(United States) Ethan Finlay	(Canada) Toronto FC	
23	(Sierra Leone) Kei Kamara	(United States) Michael Parkhurst	(United States) Colorado Rapids	
25		(United States) Wil Trapp (Sierra Leone) Kei Kamara	(United States) New York City FC (United States) Sporting Kansas City	
26	(Argentina) Federico Higuaín		(United States) New York City FC	
28	(Ghana) Harrison Afful (Sierra Leone) Kei Kamara		(United States) Philadelphia Union	
29	(Cameroon) Tony Tchani	(Sierra Leone) Kei Kamara	(United States) D.C. United	
34	(Ghana) Harrison Afful (United States) Ethan Finlay	(United States) Jack McInerney	(United States) D.C. United	

=== MLS Player of the Week ===
Week	Player	Opponent	Link
8	(United States) Ethan Finlay	Philadelphia Union	
12	(Sierra Leone) Kei Kamara	Chicago Fire	
23	(Sierra Leone) Kei Kamara	Colorado Rapids	
28	(Sierra Leone) Kei Kamara	Philadelphia Union	

=== MLS Save of the Week ===
Week	Player	Opponent	Link
11	(United States) Steve Clark	San Jose Earthquakes	

=== 2015 MLS All-Star Game ===
Reserves

- DF Waylon Francis
- MF Ethan Finlay
- FW Kei Kamara

=== 2015 MLS Homegrown Game ===
- GK Matt Lampson
- MF Ben Swanson

=== Postseason ===
MLS Humanitarian of the Year Award

- FW Kei Kamara

Operations Staff of the Year
Athletic Training Staff of the Year

=== Crew SC Team Awards ===
- Most Valuable Player – Kei Kamara
- Golden Boot – Kei Kamara
- Defender of the Year – Waylon Francis
- Kirk Urso Heart Award – Michael Parkhurst
- Humanitarian of the Year – Kei Kamara
- Academy Player of the Year – Edward Folds III

== Kits ==
Home	Away

Type	Shirt	Shorts	Socks	First appearance / Info
Home	Yellow	Yellow	Yellow	Week 1 against Houston Dynamo
Away	Black	Black	Black	Week 2 against Toronto FC
