= MLS Cup 2015 =

2015 edition of the MLS Cup

- Event: MLS Cup
Columbus Crew SC	Portland Timbers
1	2
- Date: December 6, 2015
- Venue: Mapfre Stadium, Columbus, Ohio, US
- MLS Cup MVP: Diego Valeri (Portland Timbers)
- Referee: Jair Marrufo
- Attendance: 21,747
- Weather: Partly cloudy, 46 °F (8 °C)

MLS Cup 2015 was the 20th edition of the MLS Cup, the championship game of Major League Soccer (MLS). The soccer match was to determine the champion of MLS' 2015 season. The championship was contested on December 6, 2015, between the Columbus Crew SC and the Portland Timbers at MAPFRE Stadium in Columbus, Ohio, with the latter winning 2–1 and earning a berth into the 2016–17 CONCACAF Champions League.

The Timbers' Diego Valeri scored the fastest goal in MLS Cup history at 27 seconds after Crew goalkeeper Steve Clark miscontrolled his defender's back-pass. Portland doubled their lead in the seventh minute with a goal by Rodney Wallace, and although Columbus got a goal back through Kei Kamara in the 18th minute, the Timbers held on for their first MLS Cup championship. It was the first men's professional sports championship for a team from the city of Portland, Oregon since the Portland Trail Blazers won the 1977 NBA championship.

== Road to the final ==
=== Tournament bracket ===
Knockout round
October 29 – Saputo Stadium
E6	Toronto FC	0
E3	Montreal Impact	3
October 28 – RFK Stadium
E5	New England Revolution	1
E4	D.C. United	2
October 29 – Providence Park
W6	Sporting Kansas City	2 (6)
W3	Portland Timbers (p)	2 (7)
October 28 – CenturyLink Field
W5	LA Galaxy	2
W4	Seattle Sounders FC	3

Conference semifinals
E3	Montreal Impact	2	1	3
E2	Columbus Crew SC (a.e.t.)	1	3	4
Eastern Conference
E4	D.C. United	0	0	0
E1	New York Red Bulls	1	1	2
W3	Portland Timbers	0	2	2
W2	Vancouver Whitecaps FC	0	0	0
Western Conference
W4	Seattle Sounders FC	2	1	3 (2)
W1	FC Dallas (p)	1	2	3 (4)

Conference finals
E2	Columbus Crew SC	2	0	2
E1	New York Red Bulls	0	1	1
W3	Portland Timbers	3	2	5
W1	FC Dallas	1	2	3

MLS Cup
December 6 – Mapfre Stadium
E2	Columbus Crew SC	1
W3	Portland Timbers	2

== Match ==
=== Summary ===
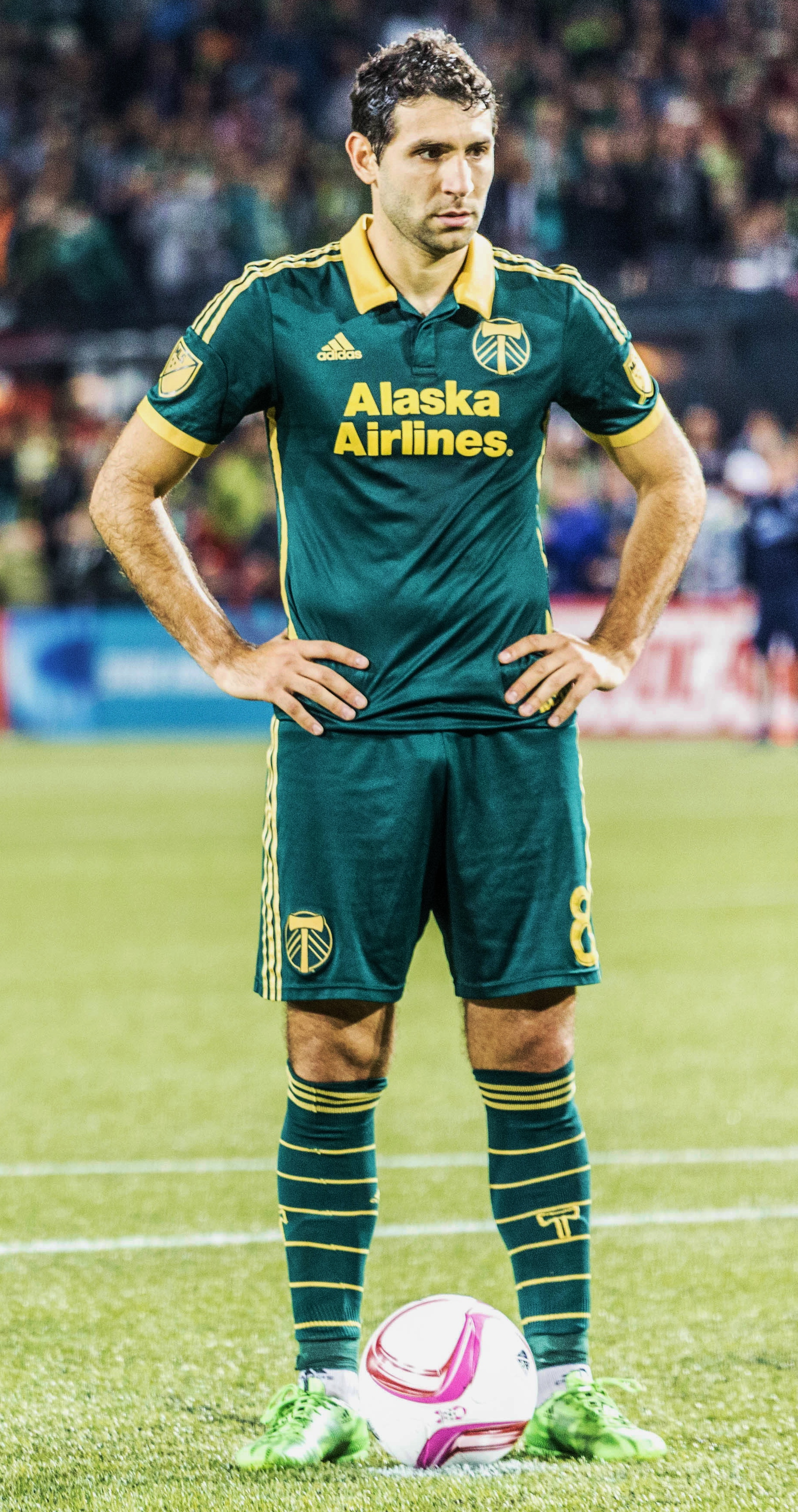
Portland midfielder Diego Valeri scored in 27 seconds, the fastest goal in the history of the MLS Cup, and was named the game's MVP.

Portland opened up the scoring early as midfielder Diego Valeri swiped the ball out from under Columbus goalkeeper Steve Clark and flicked the ball into the back of the net with one touch at the 27-second mark. It was the fastest ever goal scored in an MLS Cup match. The Timbers kept the pressure on, and when the assistant referee failed to call a ball out of bounds after it drifted across the sideline and several Crew players stopped playing, Portland midfielder Darlington Nagbe capitalized, passing to forward Lucas Melano to set the table for a goal by left winger Rodney Wallace that put Portland on top 2–0 in the seventh minute.

In the 18th minute, Columbus got on the board after Portland goalkeeper Adam Kwarasey failed to take control in a scramble at the goal line and Columbus forward Kei Kamara, the league's leading scorer, shot the ball into the net. Kamara's goal to make the game 2–1 ended up as Columbus' only shot on goal of the match.

Portland got a number of opportunities to score in the second half, but the Timbers failed to convert. In the 60th minute, a Portland corner kick resulted in a loose ball in the penalty box, which ricocheted off the goalpost before being cleared after striking Columbus captain Michael Parkhurst's arm on the goal line. However, no handball was called and no goal was awarded. In the 69th minute, Portland striker Fanendo Adi headed the ball toward the goal, but it deflected off the far goalpost and then bounced away off Clark's body. Clark also stopped a point-blank header from Portland center back Nat Borchers in the 81st minute, and then tipped another shot by Adi over the net shortly thereafter. The game ended with a 2–1 scoreline as Columbus was unsuccessful in taking advantage of Portland's missed opportunities, giving the Timbers their first MLS Cup victory and the city of Portland its first men's pro sports championship since the Portland Trail Blazers won the NBA championship in 1977. Valeri was named the match's Most Valuable Player.

=== Match details ===
December 6, 2015
4:00 p.m. EST

Columbus Crew SC	1–2	Portland Timbers
Kamara 18'	Report	Valeri 1'; Wallace 7'

Mapfre Stadium, Columbus, Ohio
Attendance: 21,747
Referee: Jair Marrufo

Columbus Crew SC	Portland Timbers

GK	1	(United States) Steve Clark
RB	25	(Ghana) Harrison Afful	(yellow card) 34'
CB	4	(United States) Michael Parkhurst (c)
CB	22	(Argentina) Gastón Sauro
LB	14	(Costa Rica) Waylon Francis
CM	6	(Cameroon) Tony Tchani		(substituted off) 72'
CM	20	(United States) Wil Trapp
RW	13	(United States) Ethan Finlay		(substituted off) 63'
AM	10	(Argentina) Federico Higuaín
LW	9	(Iraq) Justin Meram		(substituted off) 78'
CF	23	(Sierra Leone) Kei Kamara
Substitutes:
GK	41	(United States) Brad Stuver
DF	2	(United States) Tyson Wahl
DF	3	(United States) Chris Klute
MF	11	(Democratic Republic of the Congo) Cedrick Mabwati		(substituted on) 63'
MF	30	(United States) Jack McInerney		(substituted on) 72'
MF	16	(United States) Hector Jiménez
MF	8	(Sweden) Mohammed Saeid		(substituted on) 78'
Manager:
(United States) Gregg Berhalter

GK	12	(Ghana) Adam Larsen Kwarasey
RB	2	(Jamaica) Alvas Powell	(yellow card) 65'
CB	7	(United States) Nat Borchers
CB	24	(England) Liam Ridgewell (c)
LB	19	(United States) Jorge Villafaña
CM	6	(United States) Darlington Nagbe
CM	21	(Colombia) Diego Chará
CM	8	(Argentina) Diego Valeri	(yellow card) 90+3'
RW	26	(Argentina) Lucas Melano		(substituted off) 59'
CF	9	(Nigeria) Fanendo Adi		(substituted off) 90+1'
LW	22	(Costa Rica) Rodney Wallace		(substituted off) 90+4'
Substitutes:
GK	90	(New Zealand) Jake Gleeson
DF	23	(Argentina) Norberto Paparatto
DF	20	(United States) Taylor Peay
MF	4	(Canada) Will Johnson
FW	13	(United States) Jack Jewsbury		(substituted on) 90+4'
FW	37	(Argentina) Maximiliano Urruti		(substituted on) 90+1'
FW	11	(Colombia) Dairon Asprilla	(yellow card) 90+3'	(substituted on) 59'
Manager:
(United States) Caleb Porter

MLS Cup MVP: Diego Valeri (Portland Timbers)

Assistant referees:
Peter Manikowski
Corey Parker
Fourth official:
Chris Penso
Fifth official:
James Conlee

Match rules

- 90 minutes.
- 30 minutes of extra time if necessary.
- Penalty shootout if scores still level.
- Seven named substitutes.
- Maximum of three substitutions.
