= Steve Clark (soccer) =

American soccer player (born 1986)

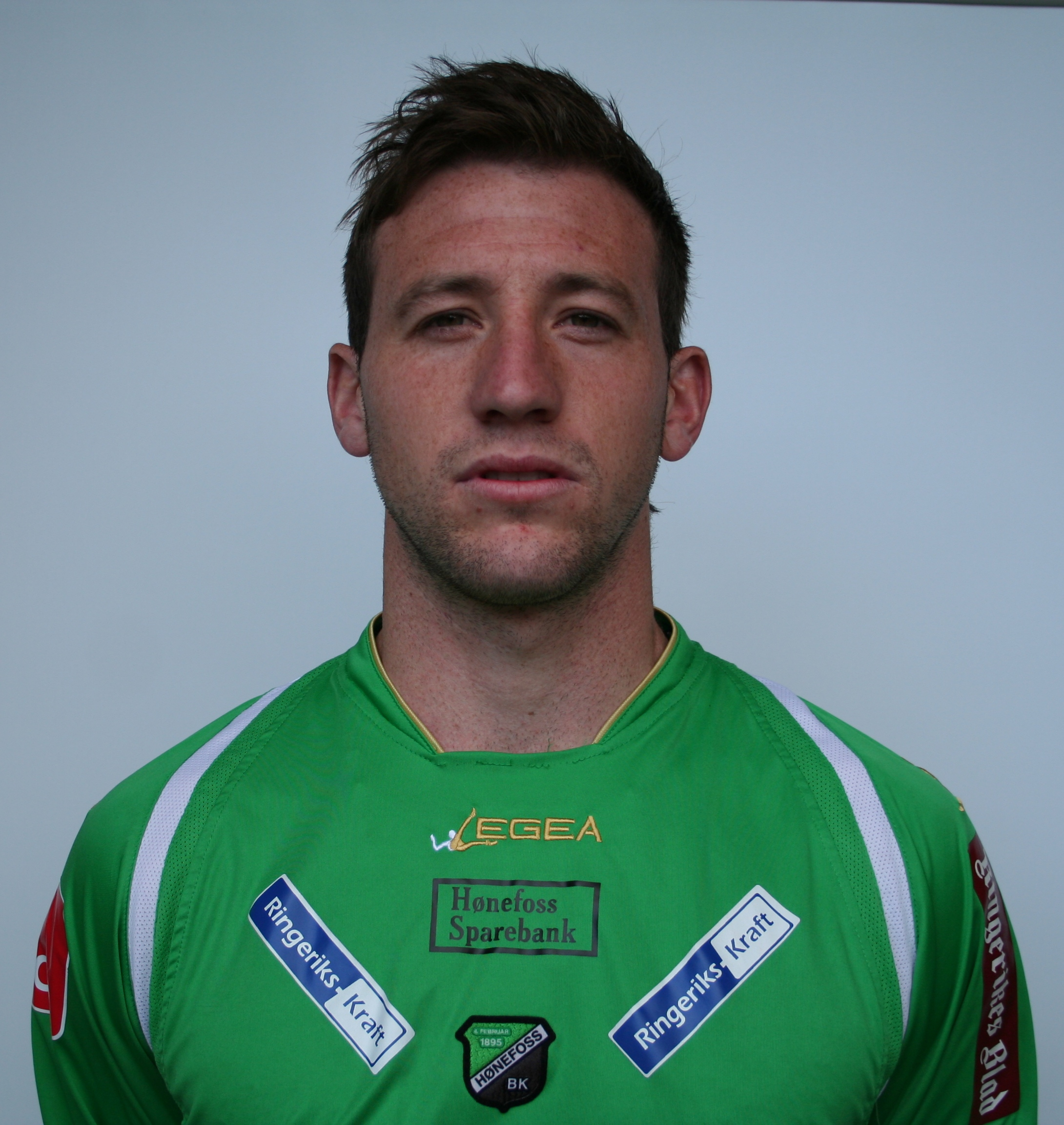

Personal information
- Full name: Steven Thomas Clark
- Date of birth: April 14, 1986 (age 40)
- Place of birth: Mason, Michigan, United States
- Height: 6 ft 1 in (1.85 m)
- Position: Goalkeeper

College career
Years	Team	Apps	(Gls)
2005–2008	Oakland Golden Grizzlies	58	(0)

Senior career*
Years	Team	Apps	(Gls)
2005	West Michigan Edge	13	(0)
2006–2009	Michigan Bucks	51	(0)
2009	Charleston Battery	0	(0)
2010–2013	Hønefoss	94	(0)
2014–2016	Columbus Crew	100	(0)
2017	AC Horsens	11	(0)
2017–2018	D.C. United	8	(0)
2018–2021	Portland Timbers	74	(0)
2022–2024	Houston Dynamo	97	(0)
- * Club domestic league appearances and goals as of October 22, 2024

Steven Thomas Clark (born April 14, 1986) is an American former professional soccer player who played as a goalkeeper.

== College and amateur career ==
Lightly recruited out of high-school, Clark walked-on for the Oakland University Golden Grizzlies. After red-shirting his first season, Clark made 2 appearances in the 2005 season. During his 2nd season at Oakland, Clark was evicted from his apartment. With just $400 to his name, he bought a tent and set it up in the woods, using his car as a closet. After living in the woods for a few months, he moved in with a teammate. He won the Grizzlies starting job in 2006. He helped Oakland make back-to-back NCAA Tournament appearances in 2007–08, making the All-Summit League 1st team both seasons. Clark won the Summit League's Defensive Player of the Year award in 2008 and was named to the All-Midwest Regional First Team.

From 2006 to 2009, Clark played with Premier Development League side Michigan Bucks, helping the PDL club to its first league championship in 2006, where he was named championship MVP. In 2007, the Bucks returned to the title game, but fell on penalties to the Laredo Heat. In 2008, Clark helped the Bucks to the club's second regular season championship and first since 2000, en route to winning the Paul R. Scicluna trophy, awarded annually to the club's Most Valuable Player. From 2006 to 2008, Clark also helped the Bucks to three-straight Lamar Hunt U.S. Open Cup appearances. In all, the Mason, MI native appeared in 75 matches over four seasons with the Pontiac-based side.

== Professional career ==
=== Early career ===
After going undrafted in the 2009 MLS SuperDraft, Clark went on trial with MLS club Real Salt Lake, but was released before signing a contract. After unsuccessful trials with other lower league clubs around the US, Clark returned to play for the Michigan Bucks. In August 2009, Clark signed with USL-1 club Charleston Battery, making just $30 a day. He was released by Charleston following the season, having made no appearances. With little money in his bank account, Clark sold most of his belongings so he could afford to travel to Europe in an attempt to find a club. In December 2009, Clark was offered a trial by 4th-tier English club Bradford City, but he eventually left due to being unable to obtain a UK work permit. He then went on trial at Norwegian Tippeligaen club Stabæk. Clark came close to signing, but the club opted for somebody else. On what was scheduled to be his last night in Norway before returning to America, Clark was hanging out with some friends when one of them called Hønefoss BK, a 2nd tier club that had just won promotion to the top flight for the first time in club history, and was able to convince the club to give Clark a trial.

=== Hønefoss ===
In January 2010, Clark signed a one-year contract with Tippeligaen club Hønefoss BK after impressing the coaches during his 1-day trial. He made his debut for the club on April 5 in a 5–1 loss to FK Haugesund. Clark made 4 appearances during the season as Hønefoss finished in 14th place and were relegated to the Adeccoligaen after losing in the relegation playoffs.

Clark was named first-choice keeper for HBK after beating out long-time starter Thomas Solvoll. Clark helped lead Hønefoss to the Adeccoligaen title, appearing in all 30 games and keeping 12 clean sheets. HBK finished the season with a league best 28 goals against. After the 2011 season, Clark signed a two-year contract extension with Hønefoss, keeping him at the club until December 2013.

Clark enjoyed a good season in 2012, playing in all 30 league games and keeping 9 clean sheets for Hønefoss, helping the club finish in 13th, 2 places and 3 points above the relegation zone. He led the league in saves and was 3rd for clean sheets He was named to the Tippeligaen Best XI by TV 2 and was named Hønefoss BK "Player of the Year" by local newspaper Ringerikes Blad.

2013 saw Clark start all 30 league games again, however this time he was not able to save HBK, as they finished bottom of the league. His contract with Hønefoss expired following the season.

=== Columbus Crew ===
On December 16, 2013, Clark was acquired by the Columbus Crew in a sign-and-trade deal with Seattle Sounders FC. The Sounders received a 2015 MLS SuperDraft fourth-round selection in exchange for sending Clark's rights to Columbus. In preseason, Clark beat out Matt Lampson for the starting spot. He made his Crew debut on March 8, 2014, helping Columbus to a 3–0 win against D.C. United. He played every minute of all 34 league matches in 2014, as well as both Open Cup matches, as Clark helped the Crew finish 3rd in the Eastern Conference, returning to playoffs after failing to qualify the previous two seasons. After a first round bye, Clark and the Crew lost 7–3 on aggregate in the Conference Semifinals. He was named as the Crew Defender of the Year and was a finalist for MLS Goalkeeper of the Year. Clark also received the Kirk Urso Heart Award, voted on by his Crew teammates for displaying heart and leadership.

On April 2, 2015, Clark signed a new Contract with Columbus. Clark played every minute of the regular season in 2015, helping the Crew finish 2nd in the East. After losing 2–1 at the Montreal Impact in leg 1 of the Conference Semifinals, Clark made 9 saves in leg 2 to help the Crew win 3–1 in extra time. In the Conference Finals, Clark kept a clean sheet as Columbus beat the New York Red Bulls 2–0 in leg 1, followed up by a 6 save performance in a 1–0 loss in leg 2 to help the Crew advance on aggregate. In MLS Cup 2015, Clark made a crucial mistake that led to Diego Valeri scoring the fastest goal in MLS Cup history. After the ball was passed back to Clark, Valeri pressed him down and blocked Clark's pass into the net. The Portland Timbers would go on to win the match 2–1.

2016 was a poor season for Columbus. Clark started the first 32 games of the season and kept 8 clean sheets, but with the team eliminated from playoff contention, he was benched for the final 2 games of the year. Columbus finished 10th in the Eastern Conference one year after playing in MLS Cup. Following the season, the Crew declined the option on Clark's contract for 2017.

=== AC Horsens ===
On January 17, 2017, Clark signed a six-month deal with AC Horsens of the Danish Superliga. He made his debut for ACH on February 18 as Den Gule Fare lost 1–0 to Silkeborg IF. Clark made 5 appearances in the regular season and played in all 6 of Horsens's relegation round matches. He then made an additional 6 appearances in the relegation playoffs, helping ACH beat Vendsyssel FF 3–1 on aggregate in the third round to remain in the Superliga. He left the club again at the end of the season.

=== D.C. United ===
On August 17, 2017, Clark signed for MLS side D.C. United. He made his debut for D.C. on September 23, keeping a clean sheet in a 4–0 win over the San Jose Earthquakes. Clark played the final 5 matches of the 2017 season. D.C. finished the year 11th in the Eastern Conference, last place, and failed to qualify for the playoffs.

Clark made his first appearance of the 2018 season on April 14 in a 1–0 win over the Columbus Crew, with Clark making 5 saves to shutout his former club. The performance saw him named to the MLS Team of the Week. On August 16, D.C. United waived Clark, having made just 3 MLS appearances and 1 Open Cup appearance in 2018.

=== Portland Timbers ===
On August 17, 2018, Clark was claimed off waivers by the Portland Timbers. He made his Timbers debut on September 1, coming off the bench and giving up a goal in a 1–1 draw against the New England Revolution after starting goalkeeper Jeff Attinella hurt his hamstring. Clark started the next 4 games before Attinella returned. In Attinella's first game back, he had to be subbed off due to a shoulder injury, with Clark coming in to finish off the 0–0 draw with FC Dallas. Clark started the next 2 games before Attinella returned for the final regular season game and playoffs. Clark ended the season with 8 appearances and 3 clean sheets for the Timbers, helping Portland finish 5th in the Western Conference. The Timbers reached MLS Cup 2018, where they lost 2–0 to Atlanta United FC, but Clark did not appear in the playoffs.

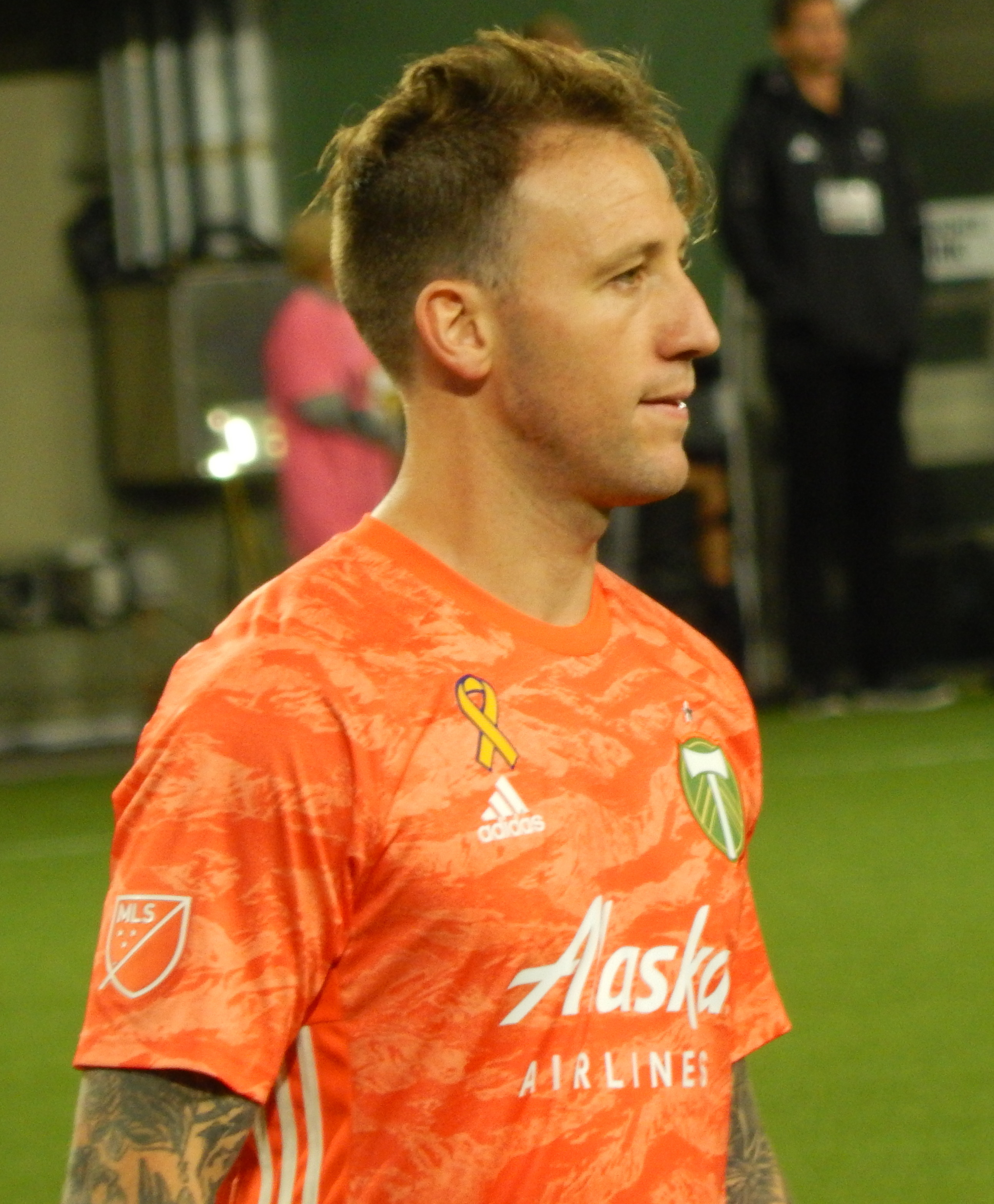
Steve Clark with the Portland Timbers in 2019

On January 24, 2019, Portland re-signed Clark for the 2019 season. Clark made his first appearance of the 2019 season on April 27, helping Portland to a 2–1 win over Toronto FC. After just 5 appearances in the first 15 MLS games of the season, Clark won the starting job in early July and started the final 19 games of the regular season. He ended the regular season with 24 appearances and 6 clean sheets, helping the Timbers to a 6th-place finish in the West, qualifying for the playoffs. Clark and the Timbers fell 2–1 to Real Salt Lake in the first round of the playoffs. He also played in all 4 of Portland's Open Cup games as they reached the semifinals, where they lost 2–1 to Minnesota United FC. On December 20, he signed a new contract with the Timbers.

Clark and the Timbers opened the 2020 season on March 1 with a 3–1 loss to Minnesota United FC. After the first 2 games of the regular season, the MLS season was paused due to the COVID-19 pandemic. Play resumed in July with the MLS is Back Tournament, with the 3 group stage games counting as regular season matches and the knockout round used to determine a CONCACAF Champions League berth. Clark started all the group stage games, helping Portland top their group. He started all 4 knockout round games as the Timbers reached the final, where they beat Orlando City SC 2–1. Clark's penalty save against the LA Galaxy's Javier “Chicharito” Hernández from their opening match of the group stage was voted "Save of the Tournament." Following the tournament, Clark appeared in 15 of Portland's remaining regular season games. He ended the shortened regular season with 20 appearances (out of a possible 23) and kept 5 clean sheets, helping the Timbers finish 3rd in the Western Conference. On November 22, Portland fell to FC Dallas 8–7 on penalties in the opening round of the playoffs.

On April 6, 2021, Clark made his Champions League debut as Portland opened the 2021 season with a 2–2 draw against C.D. Marathón. He kept a clean sheet in the return leg to help the Timbers to a 5–0 win, advancing 7–2 on aggregate. On April 18, in Portland's first MLS game of the season, Clark had to come off in a 1–0 loss to Cascadia Cup rivals Vancouver Whitecaps FC due to a thigh injury. He would miss the Timbers next 6 MLS games and the CCL quarterfinal matchup with Club América, a 4–2 aggregate loss. Portland finished 4th in the West, with Clark making 24 appearances and keeping 7 clean sheets in regular season play. Clark had a 78.2% save percentage in the regular season, which was second-highest in the entire league. In the playoffs, Clark played every minute of Portland's 4 games and kept 2 clean sheets, helping the Timbers reach MLS Cup 2021, where they lost 4–2 on penalties to NYCFC.

=== Houston Dynamo ===
On December 22, 2021, Clark signed a two-year deal as a free agent with the Houston Dynamo. He made his Dynamo debut on February 27, 2022, keeping a clean sheet to give Houston a 0–0 draw with Real Salt Lake in the opening game of the season. He appeared in 33 of Houston's 34 regular season games (only missing a game due to his daughter's birth) and kept 6 clean sheets. Clark and the Dynamo finished the season 13th in the Western Conference, missing out on the playoffs.

== Career statistics ==
As of December 2, 2023

Club	Season	League			League cup (Note: Includes the PDL Playoffs, MLS Cup Playoffs, and Superliga relegation playoffs)		National cup (Note: Includes the U.S. Open Cup and Norwegian Football Cup)		Continental		Other		Total	
Club	Season	Division	Apps	Goals	Apps	Goals	Apps	Goals	Apps	Goals	Apps	Goals	Apps	Goals
West Michigan Edge	2005	PDL	13	0	—		—		—		—		13	0
Michigan Bucks	2006	PDL	9	0	4	0	3	0	—		—		16	0
Michigan Bucks	2007	PDL	12	0	4	0	1	0	—		—		17	0
Michigan Bucks	2008	PDL	15	0	1	0	1	0	—		—		17	0
Michigan Bucks	2009	PDL	15	0	—		—		—		—		15	0
Michigan Bucks	Total		51	0	9	0	5	0	0	0	0	0	65	0
Charleston Battery	2009	USL-1	0	0	0	0	0	0	—		—		0	0
Hønefoss	2010	Tippeligaen	4	0	0	0	0	0	—		—		4	0
Hønefoss	2011	Adeccoligaen	30	0	—		2	0	—		—		32	0
Hønefoss	2012	Tippeligaen	30	0	—		0	0	—		—		30	0
Hønefoss	2013	Tippeligaen	30	0	—		1	0	—		—		31	0
Hønefoss	Total		94	0	0	0	3	0	0	0	0	0	97	0
Columbus Crew	2014	MLS	34	0	2	0	2	0	—		—		38	0
Columbus Crew	2015	MLS	34	0	5	0	0	0	—		—		39	0
Columbus Crew	2016	MLS	32	0	—		0	0	—		—		32	0
Columbus Crew	Total		100	0	7	0	2	0	0	0	0	0	109	0
AC Horsens	2016–17	Superliga	11	0	6	0	0	0	—		—		17	0
D.C. United	2017	MLS	5	0	—		0	0	—		—		5	0
D.C. United	2018	MLS	3	0	0	0	1	0	—		—		4	0
D.C. United	Total		8	0	0	0	1	0	0	0	0	0	9	0
Portland Timbers	2018	MLS	8	0	0	0	0	0	—		—		8	0
Portland Timbers	2019	MLS	24	0	1	0	4	0	—		—		29	0
Portland Timbers	2020	MLS	20	0	1	0	—		—		4 (Note: Appearances in the MLS is Back Tournament knockout stage)	0	25	0
Portland Timbers	2021	MLS	24	0	4	0	—		2 (Note: Appearances in CONCACAF Champions League)	0	—		30	0
Portland Timbers	Total		76	0	6	0	4	0	2	0	4	0	92	0
Houston Dynamo	2022	MLS	33	0	—		0	0	—		—		33	0
Houston Dynamo	2023	MLS	33	0	5	0	0	0	—		3 (Note: Appearances in Leagues Cup)	0	41	0
Houston Dynamo	Total		66	0	5	0	0	0	—		3	0	74	0
Career total			419	0	33	0	15	0	2	0	7	0	435	0

== Honors ==
Hønefoss BK

- Norwegian 1. divisjon: 2011

Columbus Crew

- Eastern Conference (Playoffs): 2015

Portland Timbers

- Western Conference (Playoffs): 2018, 2021
- MLS is Back Tournament: 2020

Houston Dynamo

- U.S. Open Cup: 2023

Individual

- All-Summit League 1st Team: 2007, 2008
- Summit League Defensive Player of the Year: 2008
- NSCAA All-Midwest Region 1st Team: 2008
- Oakland University Golden Grizzlies Hall of Honor: Class of 2016
- TV 2's Tippeligaen Best XI: 2012
- Kirk Urso Heart Award: 2014
- MLS is Back Save of the Tournament: 2020

== Personal life ==
Steve Clark is married to Carella Clark (née DiMaggio). Carella played college soccer at Appalachian State University and Oakland University. The couple met and started dating while at Oakland. Together they have a daughter. Carella works as a fitness trainer. Clark is a Christian.
