= Hector Jiménez (soccer) =

American soccer player (born 1988)

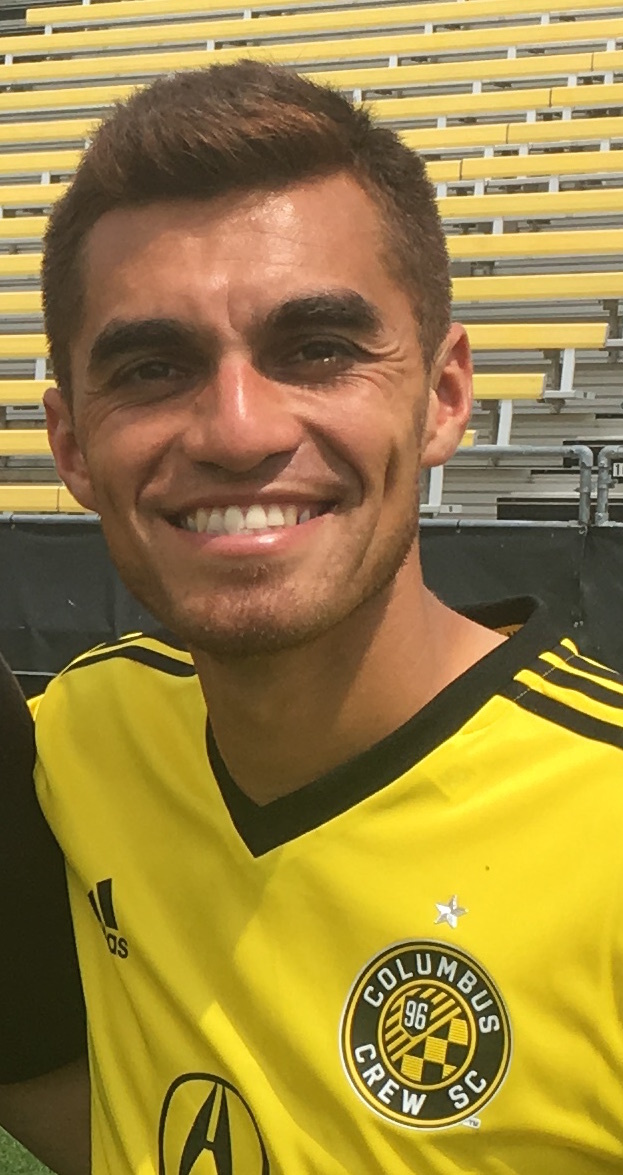
- Jiménez in 2017

Personal information
- Full name: Hector Osvaldo Jiménez
- Date of birth: November 3, 1988 (age 38)
- Place of birth: Huntington Park, California, United States
- Height: 5 ft 9 in (1.75 m)
- Position: Defender

Youth career
- 2002–2006: Arsenal FC (California)
- 2005: IMG Soccer Academy

College career
Years	Team	Apps	(Gls)
2006–2010	California Golden Bears		

Senior career*
Years	Team	Apps	(Gls)
2011–2013	LA Galaxy	43	(4)
2014–2020	Columbus Crew SC	133	(2)
2021–2024	Austin FC	56	(1)
Total		232	(7)

Managerial career
- 2025–: Chicago Fire (assistant)
Medal record
LA Galaxy
First place	Supporters' Shield	2011
First place	MLS Cup	2011
First place	MLS Cup	2012
Columbus Crew
First place	MLS Cup	2020
- * Club domestic league appearances and goals as of 02:49, October 22, 2024 (UTC)

Hector Osvaldo Jiménez (born November 3, 1988) is an American retired professional soccer player who played as a defender. He is currently an assistant coach with Major League Soccer club Chicago Fire.

== College and amateur career ==
Hector played two years at Bell Gardens High School from 2004 to 2006 where he established himself as one of the team's leaders and caught the eye of various soccer programs across the country.

Jiménez is a product of the University of California Berkeley where he played between 2006 and 2010. He was three-time First Team All-Pac-10 (2008–2010), NSCAA Second Team Far West Region, no. 2 on Cal's all-time assist list, ESPN The Magazine Academic All-District 8 team, NSCAA First Team Far West All-Region and was three-time Second Team Pac-10 All-Academic. During his college years, Jiménez also played with the Bay Area Ambassadors of the National Premier Soccer League.

== Professional career ==
=== LA Galaxy ===
On January 14, 2011, Jiménez was drafted in the second round (34th overall) in the 2011 MLS SuperDraft by Los Angeles Galaxy. He played three seasons with the Galaxy, recording four goals and six assists in 43 appearances while helping the Galaxy win titles in 2011 and 2012.

=== Columbus Crew SC ===
On January 14, 2014, Jiménez was traded to the Columbus Crew for a Second Round 2014 MLS SuperDraft selection (42nd overall) and allocation money. He made his club debut on March 8, 2014, in a 3–0 victory over D.C. United. His first goal for the Crew came on April 19, 2014, also against D.C. United. Jiménez's 90th-minute goal earned the Crew a 1–1 draw and would be nominated for MLS AT&T Goal of the Week honors. He went on to appear in both legs of the Crew's playoff series against the New England Revolution.

Jiménez made 23 appearances in 2015, including his 75th professional appearance on May 16 against the San Jose Earthquakes. He notched four assists on the season while playing at four different positions. However, he did not appear in the playoffs as Crew SC made a run to MLS Cup 2015, where they would fall 2–1 to the Portland Timbers.

Jiménez racked up 25 appearances in 2016, playing five different positions. He made his 100th career appearance on July 3, in a 3–2 defeat to Sporting KC. During the 2017 season, Jiménez made 23 appearances for Columbus. However, in 2018, the signing of Milton Valenzuela, a young Designated Player, saw Jiménez's time on the field significantly decrease, with him only making 12 total appearances. However, during the 2019 season Valenzuela suffered a long-term injury which again saw Jiménez seize the starting left back position and he made a total of 23 appearances.

In his last season with Columbus, Jiménez made a total of 10 appearances. One of these appearances was during the 2020 MLS Cup where Columbus beat Seattle Sounders FC 3–0. On December 14, 2020, Columbus declined their contract option on Jiménez following their 2020 season ending his time with the club.

=== Austin FC ===
On December 21, 2020, Jiménez joined Austin FC as a free agent ahead of their inaugural season in 2021. He made his first start for Austin on May 15 against former club LA Galaxy, but was removed on a stretcher in the first half. His next appearance came on June 24, replacing injured right-back Nick Lima. Jiménez scored the final goal of Austin's 4–1 win over Portland Timbers on July 1, the club's first win at Q2 Stadium.

== Coaching career ==
On January 8, 2025, it was announced that Jiménez had joined the coaching staff for Major League Soccer club Chicago Fire as an assistant coach.

== Career statistics ==
=== Club ===
As of October 19, 2024

Club	Season	League			League cup (Note: Appearance(s) in MLS Cup Playoffs)		U.S. Open Cup		CCL		Other (Note: Includes Leagues Cup)		Total	
Club	Season	Division	Apps	Goals	Apps	Goals	Apps	Goals	Apps	Goals	Apps	Goals	Apps	Goals
LA Galaxy	2011	MLS	2	0	—		1	0	1	0	—		4	0
LA Galaxy	2012	MLS	15	1	1	0	1	0	4	0	—		21	1
LA Galaxy	2013	MLS	26	3	1	0	1	0	3	0	—		31	3
LA Galaxy	Total		43	4	2	0	3	0	8	0	—		56	4
Columbus Crew SC	2014	MLS	24	1	2	0	2	0	—		—		28	1
Columbus Crew SC	2015	MLS	23	0	—		1	0	—		—		24	0
Columbus Crew SC	2016	MLS	25	0	—		2	0	—		—		27	0
Columbus Crew SC	2017	MLS	19	0	4	0	1	0	—		—		24	0
Columbus Crew SC	2018	MLS	11	0	1	0	1	0	—		—		13	0
Columbus Crew SC	2019	MLS	23	1	—		2	0	—		—		25	1
Columbus Crew SC	2020	MLS	8	0	2	0	—		—		—		10	0
Columbus Crew SC	Total		133	2	9	0	9	0	—		—		151	2
Austin FC	2021	MLS	25	1	—		—		—		—		25	1
Austin FC	2022	MLS	14	0	—		1	0	—		—		15	0
Austin FC	2023	MLS	2	0	0	0	1	0	1	0	1	0	5	0
Austin FC	2024	MLS	15	0	0	0	—		—		0	0	15	0
Austin FC	Total		56	1	0	0	2	0	1	0	1	0	60	1
Career total			231	7	11	0	14	0	9	0	1	0	266	7

== Personal life ==
Both of Jiménez's parents are Mexican immigrants, who met in the United States.

== Honors ==
LA Galaxy

- MLS Cup: 2011, 2012
- Major League Soccer Supporters' Shield: 2011
- Major League Soccer Western Conference Championship: 2011, 2012

Columbus Crew SC

- MLS Cup: 2020
