= Adam Larsen Kwarasey =

Footballer (born 1987)

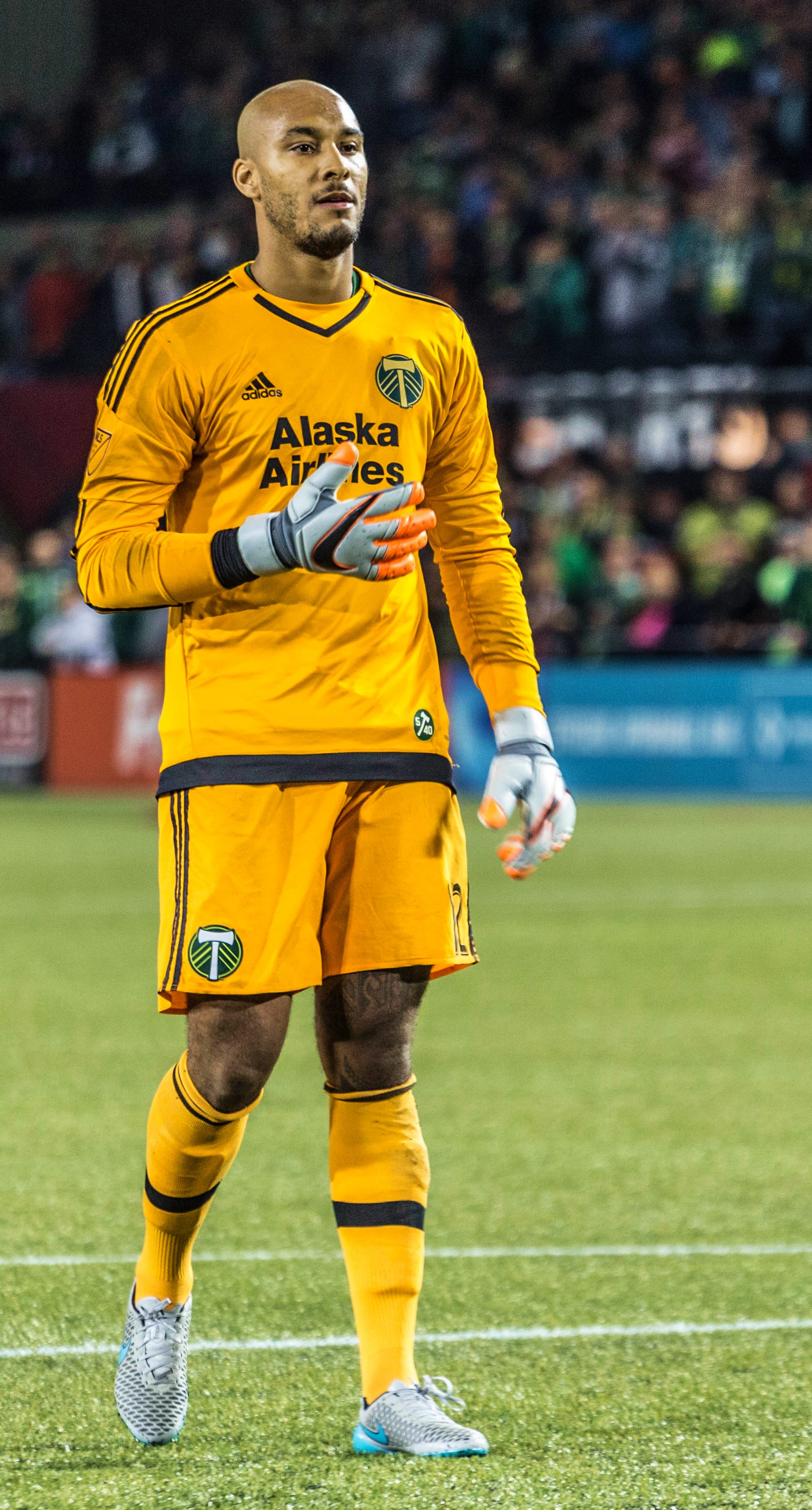
- Larsen Kwarasey playing for the Portland Timbers

Personal information
- Full name: Adambathia Larsen Kwarasey
- Date of birth: 12 December 1987 (age 38)
- Place of birth: Oslo, Norway
- Height: 1.90 m (6 ft 3 in)
- Position: Goalkeeper

Youth career
- Trosterud
- 2006–2007: Vålerenga

Senior career*
Years	Team	Apps	(Gls)
2007–2014	Strømsgodset	154	(0)
2009	Strømsgodset 2	1	(0)
2015–2016	Portland Timbers	40	(0)
2016–2017	Rosenborg	9	(0)
2017	Brøndby	2	(0)
2017–2020	Vålerenga	61	(0)
Total		267	(0)

International career^{‡}
2008	Norway U21	1	(0)
2011–2016	Ghana	24	(0)
- * Club domestic league appearances and goals as of 12 August 2020 ‡ National team caps and goals as of 14:11, 15 July 2019 (UTC)

Adambathia Larsen "Adam" Kwarasey (born 12 December 1987) is a retired professional footballer who played as a goalkeeper. Born in Norway, Kwarasey represented Ghana at international level.

== Early and personal life ==
Kwarasey was born in Oslo, Norway to a father from Ghana and a mother from Norway. He holds both Ghanaian and Norwegian passports.

== Club career ==
=== Strømsgodset ===
Kwarasey played youth football with Trosterud and Vålerenga. After moving to Strømsgodset, he made his debut on 6 May 2007. He scored his first senior goal in 2010, converting a penalty kick in the cup against Modum. Kwarasey was the captain of the club in 2013 when Strømsgodset won Tippeligaen for the first time since 1970. He also won the Kniksen Award as the best goalkeeper in the 2013 season.

Kwarasey announced on 31 October 2014 that he would leave Strømsgodset after the 2014 season, when his contract expired.

=== Portland Timbers ===
Kwarasey signed for the Major League Soccer club Portland Timbers in December 2014. In the one-game knockout round of the MLS Cup 2015 playoffs against Sporting Kansas City, the game went to a penalty-kick shootout. The shootout was tied after all 10 field players had taken their shots, so the goalkeepers went next; Kwarasey scored his shot, then saved his opposite number Jon Kempin's shot, winning his team the shootout and enabling it to advance to the next round. The Timbers won the next two rounds and then the 2015 MLS Cup, the league championship.

During the match against San Jose Earthquakes on 16 April 2016, Kwarasey suffered a finger injury, which turned out to be a torn ligament that would rule him out for a month.

=== Rosenborg ===
Kwarasey returned to Norwegian football in July 2016 after signing a three-and-a-half-year contract with Rosenborg. The Timbers stated that this move "helps free up cap space" and "made sense for Kwarasey and his family." The lanky Ghanaian international won the Tippeligaen and the Norwegian Football Cup in his only season with the Norwegian football giants. This was his fourth time of winning a medal in the Norway, after captaining Strømsgodset to their first league title since 1970. He left Rosenborg in 2017 for Brøndby in Denmark.

=== Brøndby ===
On 9 January 2017, it was confirmed by Brøndby that Kwarasey had signed a four-year contract with the club.

=== Vålerenga ===
On 6 June 2017, Kwarasey Larsen agreed a three-year contract with former youth club Vålerenga. Due to the Norwegian transfer window which opens on 21 July, he will not be available to play competitively for Vålerenga until that date, although he will be able to train with the team. He left the club in August 2020.

== International career ==
In November 2007, Kwarasey declared that he would play international football for Ghana. However, he played a friendly match for Norway under-21 in 2008. In October 2010, Kwarasey received his Ghanaian passport and became eligible to play for Ghana. On 30 July 2011, Kwarasey was called up to the Ghana national team for a match against Nigeria. That match was postponed due to security reasons, although Kwarasey confirmed his intention to become Ghana's first-choice goalkeeper. He made his international debut for Ghana on 2 September 2011 in a 2012 Africa Cup of Nations qualifier against Swaziland, before playing in a friendly match against Brazil at Craven Cottage in London three days later. Kwarasey was named to Ghana's 23-man squad for the 2012 Africa Cup of Nations. He was the team's first choice goalkeeper throughout the tournament, as the Black Stars finished in fourth place.

Kwarasey made two appearances for the Black Stars during their successful 2014 FIFA World Cup qualifying campaign, serving as understudy to Fatau Dauda. On 2 June 2014, Kwarasey was named in Ghana's squad for the 2014 FIFA World Cup. He started in goal for the Black Stars in the team's opening match, a 2–1 defeat against the United States in Natal. After his team defeat, he planned to quit playing with Black Stars. In August 2014, he was dropped from the national team.

== Career statistics ==
As of 8 November 2019

Appearances and goals by club, season and competition
Club	Season	League			Cup (Note: Includes the Norwegian Football Cup, U.S. Open Cup, and Danish Cup)		Continental		Other (Note: All appearances in the MLS Cup Playoffs)		Total	
Club	Season	Division	Apps	Goals	Apps	Goals	Apps	Goals	Apps	Goals	Apps	Goals
Strømsgodset	2007	Tippeligaen	4	0	1	0	–		–		5	0
Strømsgodset	2008	Tippeligaen	4	0	3	0	–		–		7	0
Strømsgodset	2009	Tippeligaen	4	0	2	0	–		–		6	0
Strømsgodset	2010	Tippeligaen	29	0	7	1	–		–		36	0
Strømsgodset	2011	Tippeligaen	28	0	4	0	2 (Note: Appearances in the Europa League)	0	–		34	0
Strømsgodset	2012	Tippeligaen	29	0	3	0	–		–		32	0
Strømsgodset	2013	Tippeligaen	30	0	1	0	3	0	–		34	0
Strømsgodset	2014	Tippeligaen	26	0	1	0	2 (Note: Appearances in the Champions League)	0	–		29	0
Strømsgodset	Total		154	0	22	1	7	0	0	0	183	1
Portland Timbers	2015	MLS	33	0	2	0	–		5	0	40	0
Portland Timbers	2016	MLS	7	0	0	0	0	0	–		7	0
Portland Timbers	Total		40	0	2	0	0	0	5	0	47	0
Rosenborg	2016	Tippeligaen	9	0	1	0	4 (Note: Two appearances in the Champions League, two appearances in the Europa League)	0	–		14	0
Brøndby	2016–17	Danish Superliga	2	0	2	0	0	0	–		4	0
Vålerenga	2017	Eliteserien	14	0	3	0	–		–		17	0
Vålerenga	2018	Eliteserien	30	0	1	0	–		–		31	0
Vålerenga	2019	Eliteserien	17	0	1	0	–		–		18	0
Vålerenga	2020	Eliteserien	0	0	0	0	–		–		0	0
Vålerenga	Total		61	0	5	0	0	0	0	0	66	0
Career total			266	0	32	1	11	0	5	0	314	1

=== International ===
As of 15 July 2019

Appearances and goals by national team and year
National team	Year	Apps	Goals
Ghana	2011	5	0
Ghana	2012	12	0
Ghana	2013	2	0
Ghana	2014	3	0
Ghana	2015	0	0
Ghana	2016	2	0
Total		24	0

== Honours ==
Strømsgodset

- Tippeligaen: 2013
- Norwegian Football Cup: 2010

Portland Timbers

- MLS Cup: 2015
- Western Conference (Playoffs): 2015

Rosenborg

- Tippeligaen: 2016
- Norwegian Football Cup: 2016

Individual

- Best Goalkeeper in Tippeligaen: 2013
- MLS Save of the Year Award: 2015
