= 2015 MLS Cup playoffs =

2015 edition of the MLS playoffs

Tournament details
- Country: United States; Canada
- Teams: 12

Final positions
- Champions: Portland Timbers (1st title)
- Runners-up: Columbus Crew SC
- Semifinalists: FC Dallas; New York Red Bulls

Tournament statistics
- Matches played: 17
- Goals scored: 46 (2.71 per match)
- Attendance: 388,289 (22,841 per match)
- Top goal scorer(s): (Sierra Leone) Kei Kamara (4 goals)

The 2015 MLS Cup playoffs (officially the Audi 2015 MLS Cup Playoffs for sponsorship reasons) was the 20th post-season tournament culminating the Major League Soccer regular season. The tournament began on October 28 with D.C. United defeating New England Revolution and culminated on December 6, 2015, with MLS Cup 2015, the twentieth league championship match for MLS.

Twelve teams (top six per conference) competed, up from ten the last three seasons. The first round of each conference had the third-seeded team hosting the sixth seed, while the fourth-seed hosts the fifth, in a single match to determine who advances to the conference semifinals. In the conference semifinals, the top seed played the lowest remaining seed, while the second seed plays the next-lowest. The winners advanced to the conference finals.

Both the conference semifinals and conference finals were played as two-legged aggregate series, with the higher-ranked team hosting the second leg. If teams were level at the end of the second leg, the away goals rule was used in attempt to determine a winner. If the away goals rule did not resolve the deadlock, 30 minutes of extra time would be played, but the away goals rule will not be applied after extra time. If scores were still level following extra time, a penalty shoot-out was conducted. The winners advanced to the MLS Cup final, a single match hosted by the participant with the better regular season record.

The winner of MLS Cup 2015, the Portland Timbers, qualified for the 2016–17 CONCACAF Champions League. If a Canadian team were to have won the MLS Cup, the next-best team from the United States would have taken their place.

On March 6, 2015, Audi was announced as the official sponsor of the playoffs starting in 2015.

The Portland Timbers won the MLS Cup by defeating Columbus Crew SC 2–1 at the Mapfre Stadium in Columbus, Ohio. The Timbers' Diego Valeri scored the fastest goal in MLS Cup history at 27 seconds, after Crew goalkeeper Steve Clark made a fundamental error by miscontrolling his defender's back-pass, allowing Valeri to strike at the opportunity.

== Qualified teams ==
The top six teams from each conference advanced to the MLS Cup playoffs.

Eastern Conference

Pos	Team	Pld	Pts
1	New York Red Bulls	34	60
2	Columbus Crew SC	34	53
3	Montreal Impact	34	51
4	D.C. United	34	51
5	New England Revolution	34	50
6	Toronto FC	34	49
7	Orlando City SC	34	44
8	New York City FC	34	37
9	Philadelphia Union	34	37
10	Chicago Fire	34	30

Source: MLS

Western Conference

Pos	Team	Pld	Pts
1	FC Dallas	34	60
2	Vancouver Whitecaps FC	34	53
3	Portland Timbers	34	53
4	Seattle Sounders FC	34	51
5	LA Galaxy	34	51
6	Sporting Kansas City	34	51
7	San Jose Earthquakes	34	47
8	Houston Dynamo	34	42
9	Real Salt Lake	34	41
10	Colorado Rapids	34	37

Source: MLS

== Bracket ==
Knockout round
October 29 – Saputo Stadium
E6	Toronto FC	0
E3	Montreal Impact	3
October 28 – RFK Stadium
E5	New England Revolution	1
E4	D.C. United	2
October 29 – Providence Park
W6	Sporting Kansas City	2 (6)
W3	Portland Timbers (p)	2 (7)
October 28 – CenturyLink Field
W5	LA Galaxy	2
W4	Seattle Sounders FC	3

Conference semifinals
E3	Montreal Impact	2	1	3
E2	Columbus Crew SC (a.e.t.)	1	3	4
Eastern Conference
E4	D.C. United	0	0	0
E1	New York Red Bulls	1	1	2
W3	Portland Timbers	0	2	2
W2	Vancouver Whitecaps FC	0	0	0
Western Conference
W4	Seattle Sounders FC	2	1	3 (2)
W1	FC Dallas (p)	1	2	3 (4)

Conference finals
E2	Columbus Crew SC	2	0	2
E1	New York Red Bulls	0	1	1
W3	Portland Timbers	3	2	5
W1	FC Dallas	1	2	3

MLS Cup
December 6 – Mapfre Stadium
E2	Columbus Crew SC	1
W3	Portland Timbers	2

== Knockout round ==
=== Eastern Conference ===
October 28
7:30 pm EDT

D.C. United	2–1	New England Revolution
Pontius 45'; Rolfe 83'	Report	Agudelo 15'

RFK Stadium, Washington, D.C.
Attendance: 11,554
Referee: Mark Geiger

October 29
7:00 pm EDT

Montreal Impact	3–0	Toronto FC
Bernier 18'; Piatti 33'; Drogba 39'	Report

Saputo Stadium, Montreal, Quebec
Attendance: 18,069
Referee: Baldomero Toledo

=== Western Conference ===
October 28
7:00 pm PDT

Seattle Sounders FC	3–2	LA Galaxy
Dempsey 5'; Valdez 12'; Friberg 77'	Report	Lletget 6'; Zardes 22'

CenturyLink Field, Seattle, Washington
Attendance: 39,537
Referee: Jair Marrufo

October 29
7:00 pm PDT

Portland Timbers	2–2 (a.e.t.)	Sporting Kansas City
Wallace 57'; Urruti 118'	Report	Ellis 87'; Németh 96'
Penalties
Valeri (penalty missed); Borchers (penalty scored); Ridgewell (penalty scored); Jewsbury (penalty missed); Urruti (penalty scored); Villafaña (penalty missed); Asprilla (penalty scored); Nagbe (penalty scored); Powell (penalty missed); Fochive (penalty scored); Kwarasey (penalty scored)	7–6	(penalty scored) Feilhaber; (penalty missed) Dwyer; (penalty scored) Zusi; (penalty missed) Besler; (penalty scored) Nagamura; (penalty missed) Ellis; (penalty scored) Mustivar; (penalty scored) Peterson; (penalty missed) Abdul-Salaam; (penalty scored) Dia; (penalty missed) Kempin

Providence Park, Portland, Oregon
Attendance: 21,144
Referee: Armando Villarreal

== Conference semifinals ==
=== Eastern Conference ===
November 1
3:00 pm EST

D.C. United	0–1	New York Red Bulls
	Report	McCarty 72'

RFK Stadium, Washington, D.C.
Attendance: 19,525
Referee: Fotis Bazakos
November 8
3:00 pm EST

New York Red Bulls	1–0	D.C. United
Wright-Phillips 90+2'	Report

Red Bull Arena, Harrison, New Jersey
Attendance: 25,219
Referee: Ted Unkel

New York Red Bulls won 2–0 on aggregate.

November 1
7:00 pm EST

Montreal Impact	2–1	Columbus Crew SC
Bernier 37'; Venegas 77'	Report	Higuaín 33'

Saputo Stadium, Montreal, Quebec
Attendance: 17,655
Referee: Chris Penso
November 8
5:00 pm EST

Columbus Crew SC	3–1 (a.e.t.)	Montreal Impact
Kamara 4', 111'; Finlay 77'	Report	Duka 40'

Mapfre Stadium, Columbus, Ohio
Attendance: 19,026
Referee: Armando Villarreal

Columbus Crew SC won 4–3 on aggregate.

=== Western Conference ===
November 1
2:00 pm PST

Portland Timbers	0–0	Vancouver Whitecaps FC
	Report

Providence Park, Portland, Oregon
Attendance: 21,144
Referee: Allen Chapman
November 8
7:00 pm PST

Vancouver Whitecaps FC	0–2	Portland Timbers
	Report	Adi 31'; Chará 90+4'

BC Place, Vancouver, British Columbia
Attendance: 27,837
Referee: Ismail Elfath

Portland Timbers won 2–0 on aggregate.

November 1
6:30 pm PST

Seattle Sounders FC	2–1	FC Dallas
Ivanschitz 67'; Dempsey 86'	Report	Castillo 18'

CenturyLink Field, Seattle, Washington
Attendance: 39,599
Referee: Kevin Stott
November 8
6:30 pm CST

FC Dallas	2–1 (a.e.t.)	Seattle Sounders FC
Akindele 84'; Zimmerman 90+1'	Report	Marshall 90'
Penalties
Díaz (penalty scored); Hollingshead (penalty scored); Akindele (penalty scored); Zimmerman (penalty scored)	4–2	(penalty scored) Dempsey; (penalty missed) Ivanschitz; (penalty missed) Barrett; (penalty scored) Rose

Toyota Stadium, Frisco, Texas
Attendance: 17,287
Referee: Baldomero Toledo

3–3 on aggregate. FC Dallas won 4–2 on penalties.

== Conference finals ==
=== Eastern Conference ===
November 22
5:00 pm EST

Columbus Crew SC	2–0	New York Red Bulls
Meram 1'; Kamara 85'	Report

Mapfre Stadium, Columbus, Ohio
Attendance: 21,617
Referee: Allen Chapman
November 29
7:30 pm EST

New York Red Bulls	1–0	Columbus Crew SC
Abang 90+3'	Report

Red Bull Arena, Harrison, New Jersey
Attendance: 25,219
Referee: Baldomero Toledo

Columbus Crew SC won 2–1 on aggregate.

=== Western Conference ===
November 22
4:30 pm PST

Portland Timbers	3–1	FC Dallas
Ridgewell 23'; Asprilla 53'; Borchers 90+1'	Report	Texeira 62'

Providence Park, Portland, Oregon
Attendance: 21,144
Referee: Ted Unkel
November 29
4:00 pm CST

FC Dallas	2–2	Portland Timbers
Hollingshead 68'; Pérez 73'	Report	Adi 54'; Melano 90+5'

Toyota Stadium, Frisco, Texas
Attendance: 20,966
Referee: Ismail Elfath

Portland Timbers won 5–3 on aggregate.

== MLS Cup 2015 ==
December 6, 2015
4:00 p.m. EST

Columbus Crew SC	1–2	Portland Timbers
Kamara 18'	Report	Valeri 1'; Wallace 7'

Mapfre Stadium, Columbus, Ohio
Attendance: 21,747
Referee: Jair Marrufo

== Top goalscorers ==
Rank	Player	Club	Goals
1	(Sierra Leone) Kei Kamara	Columbus Crew SC	4
2	(Nigeria) Fanendo Adi	Portland Timbers	2
2	(Canada) Patrice Bernier	Montreal Impact	2
2	(United States) Clint Dempsey	Seattle Sounders FC	2
2	(Costa Rica) Rodney Wallace	Portland Timbers	2
6	34 players		1
