= Waylon Francis =

Costa Rican football player (born 1990)

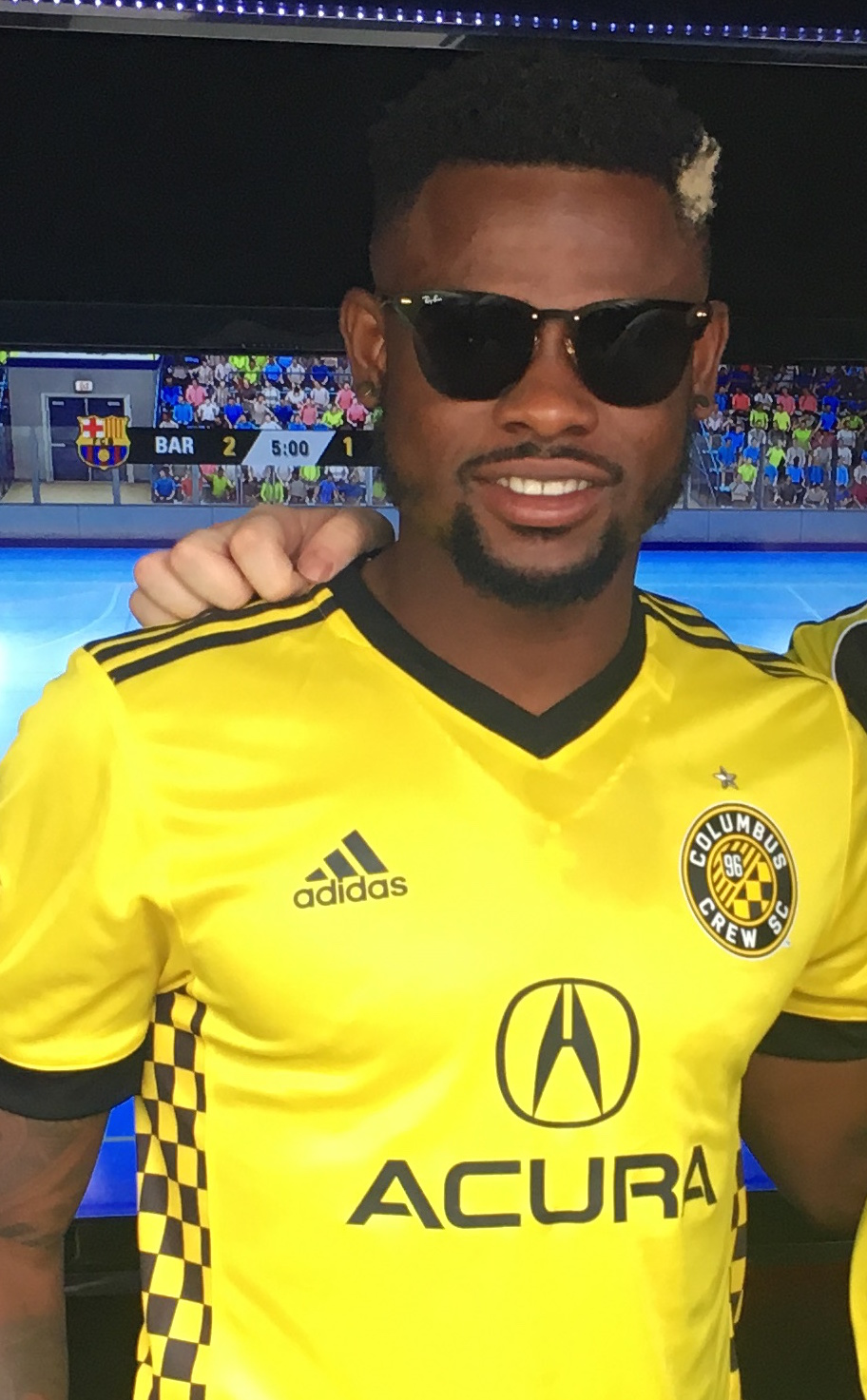
- Francis with the Columbus Crew in 2017

Personal information
- Full name: Waylon Dwayne Francis Box
- Date of birth: September 20, 1990 (age 36)
- Place of birth: Limón, Costa Rica
- Height: 1.75 m (5 ft 9 in)
- Position: Left-back

Team information
- Current team: Escorpiones
- Number: 12

Senior career*
Years	Team	Apps	(Gls)
2010–2011	Brujas	9	(0)
2011	Limón	18	(0)
2012–2013	Herediano	68	(1)
2014–2017	Columbus Crew	83	(0)
2018	Seattle Sounders FC	11	(0)
2018	Seattle Sounders FC 2	1	(0)
2019–2021	Columbus Crew	44	(0)
2022–2023	Herediano	37	(0)
2024–2026	Liberia	77	(2)
2026–	Escorpiones	1	(0)

International career^{‡}
2013–2019	Costa Rica	6	(0)
- * Club domestic league appearances and goals as of 8 November 2021 ‡ National team caps and goals as of 23 March 2019

Waylon Dwayne Francis Box (Spanish pronunciation: [ˈwajloɱ ˈfɾansis]; born 20 September 1990) is a Costa Rican professional footballer who plays as a left-back for Liga FPD club Escorpiones.

== Club career ==
Waylon Francis began his career in the youth system of Deportivo Saprissa. He made his First Division debut with Brujas on January 13, 2011, in a match against Barrio México. After a brief stay with Brujas he joined Limón, remaining only for one season with the Caribbean club. In 2012, he joined Herediano. He scored the first goal of his career playing for Herediano at Estadio Rommel Fernández in Panama against Tauro FC in the 2012–13 CONCACAF Champions League. He was a high-profile subject of racist slants in a game against Cartaginés, prompting the referee to stop the game.

His play with Herediano in the Champions League drew the attention of Major League Soccer club Columbus Crew SC who made him the club's first signing for the 2014 season. Francis made his MLS and club debut on March 8, 2014, in a 3–0 victory over D.C. United. In 2015, Francis was selected along with two other teammates, to participate in the MLS All-Star Game versus Tottenham Hotspur of the English Premier League. He missed the end of the 2016 season after undergoing surgery on his right shoulder in early October. On December 1, 2017, Crew SC declined Francis' contract option, ending his four-year tenure with the club.

On 14 December 2017, Francis was traded to Seattle Sounders FC for $50,000 of General Allocation Money.

On 5 February 2019, Francis was traded to Columbus Crew SC for $50,000 of General Allocation Money.

Columbus declined their contract option on Francis following their 2020 season. He re-signed with the club on 6 January 2021. Following the 2021 season, Columbus opted to decline their contract option on Francis.

On 3 February 2022, it was announced that Francis had signed a three-year deal with Herediano to return to his native Costa Rica.

== International career ==
Waylon Francis was part of Costa Rica's Under-23 side. Francis was a part of the team that won the 2013 Copa Centroamericana, in which he made his debut against Nicaragua.

Francis was also a part of the team that reached the quarterfinals at the 2014 FIFA World Cup. Although he did not play, he is famously known for yelling "¡Llore conmigo, papi!" ("Cry with me, daddy!") during an effusive celebration with a sobbing José Miguel Cubero after qualifying to the quarterfinals.

== Career statistics ==
=== International ===
As of match played 23 March 2019

National team	Year	Apps	Goals
Costa Rica	2013	1	0
Costa Rica	2015	2	0
Costa Rica	2016	1	0
Costa Rica	2019	2	0
Total		6	0

== Honours ==
Herediano

- Liga FPD: Clausura 2012, Clausura 2013

Columbus Crew

- MLS Cup: 2020
- Campeones Cup: 2021

Costa Rica

- Copa Centroamericana: 2013

== Personal life ==
Francis was married to Stephanie Gonzales Dávila, but they were divorced in 2016.

Francis earned his U.S. green card in June 2016. This status also qualifies him as a domestic player for MLS roster purposes.
