= Cedrick Mabwati =

Congolese footballer (born 1992)

Cedrick
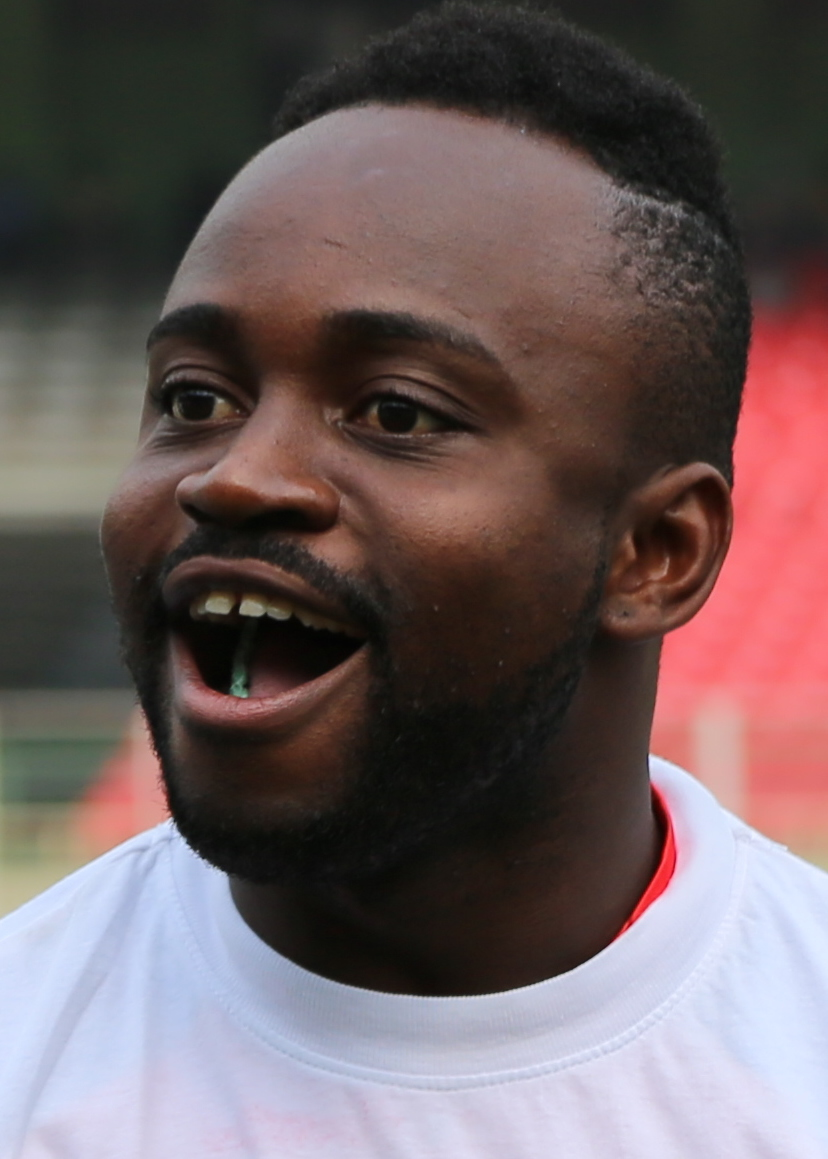
- Cedrick in 2016

Personal information
- Full name: Cedrick Mabwati Gerard
- Date of birth: 8 March 1992 (age 34)
- Place of birth: Kinshasa, Zaire
- Height: 1.67 m (5 ft 6 in)
- Position: Winger

Youth career
- 2004–2005: Santa Marta
- 2005–2008: Atlético Madrid

Senior career*
| Years | Team | Apps | (Gls) |
| 2008–2010 | Atlético Madrid B | 54 | (4) |
| 2010–2011 | Atlético Madrid | 0 | (0) |
| 2010–2011 | → Numancia (loan) | 40 | (9) |
| 2011–2013 | Numancia | 68 | (4) |
| 2013–2015 | Betis | 23 | (0) |
| 2014–2015 | → Osasuna (loan) | 14 | (0) |
| 2015–2016 | Columbus Crew | 30 | (2) |
| 2015 | → Osasuna (loan) | 16 | (0) |
| 2017 | UCAM Murcia | 4 | (0) |
| 2018–2019 | Internacional Madrid | 6 | (0) |
| 2020 | Tudelano | 0 | (0) |
| 2021–2022 | Avilés | 49 | (4) |
| 2022–2023 | Marbella | 18 | (0) |
| 2023 | Acero | 3 | (0) |

International career
| 2009–2012 | DR Congo U20 | 4 | (0) |
| 2014–2016 | DR Congo | 18 | (0) |
- * Club domestic league appearances and goals as of 14:24, 31 March 2025 (UTC)

Cedrick Mabwati Gerard (born 8 March 1992), known simply as Cedrick, is a Congolese professional footballer who plays as a left winger.

== Club career ==
Born in Kinshasa, Cedrick arrived in Spain in his early teens, moving with his family from the Democratic Republic of the Congo and joining Atlético Madrid's youth system at the age of 13. He made his senior debut only three years later, going on to spend two full seasons with the reserves in the Segunda División B.

On 6 January 2010, not yet aged 18, Cedrick made his first-team debut with Atlético, against Recreativo de Huelva in the round of 16 of Copa del Rey: after committing a penalty in the early minutes of the game, he was replaced shortly after by manager Quique Sánchez Flores in an eventual 3–0 away loss (5–4 aggregate win). In the ensuing summer, he was loaned to Segunda División club CD Numancia in a season-long move.

Cedrick was first choice during his three-year spell in Soria, scoring nine goals in his first season. On 10 June 2013, he bought out his contract with Numancia for a mere €1,20 and signed with Real Betis. He made his La Liga debut on 18 August by starting in a 2–1 defeat at Real Madrid, and totalled 1,129 minutes of action in 12 starts as the Andalusians were relegated.

On 28 August 2014, Cedrick was loaned to CA Osasuna also in division two. On 30 January of the following year, he signed for Major League Soccer's Columbus Crew, but remained on loan to the Navarrese until the end of the campaign.

Cedrick returned to Spain and its second tier on 27 December 2016, after agreeing to a six-month deal with UCAM Murcia CF. He remained in the country the following years after recovering from a serious knee injury, representing in quick succession Internacional de Madrid, CD Tudelano and Real Avilés Industrial CF.

== International career ==
Aged only 17, Cedrick started appearing with the DR Congo under-20s. He made his debut for the full team on 6 September 2014, starting in a 2–0 home loss against Cameroon in the 2015 Africa Cup of Nations qualifying phase.

Cedrick played all six matches in the final stages in Equatorial Guinea, helping his country to the third place. In the last, against the hosts, he converted his penalty shoot-out attempt in a 4–2 win.

== Honours ==
Columbus Crew

- Eastern Conference: 2015

DR Congo

- Africa Cup of Nations third place: 2015
