= Rodney Wallace (footballer) =

Costa Rican football player (born 1988)

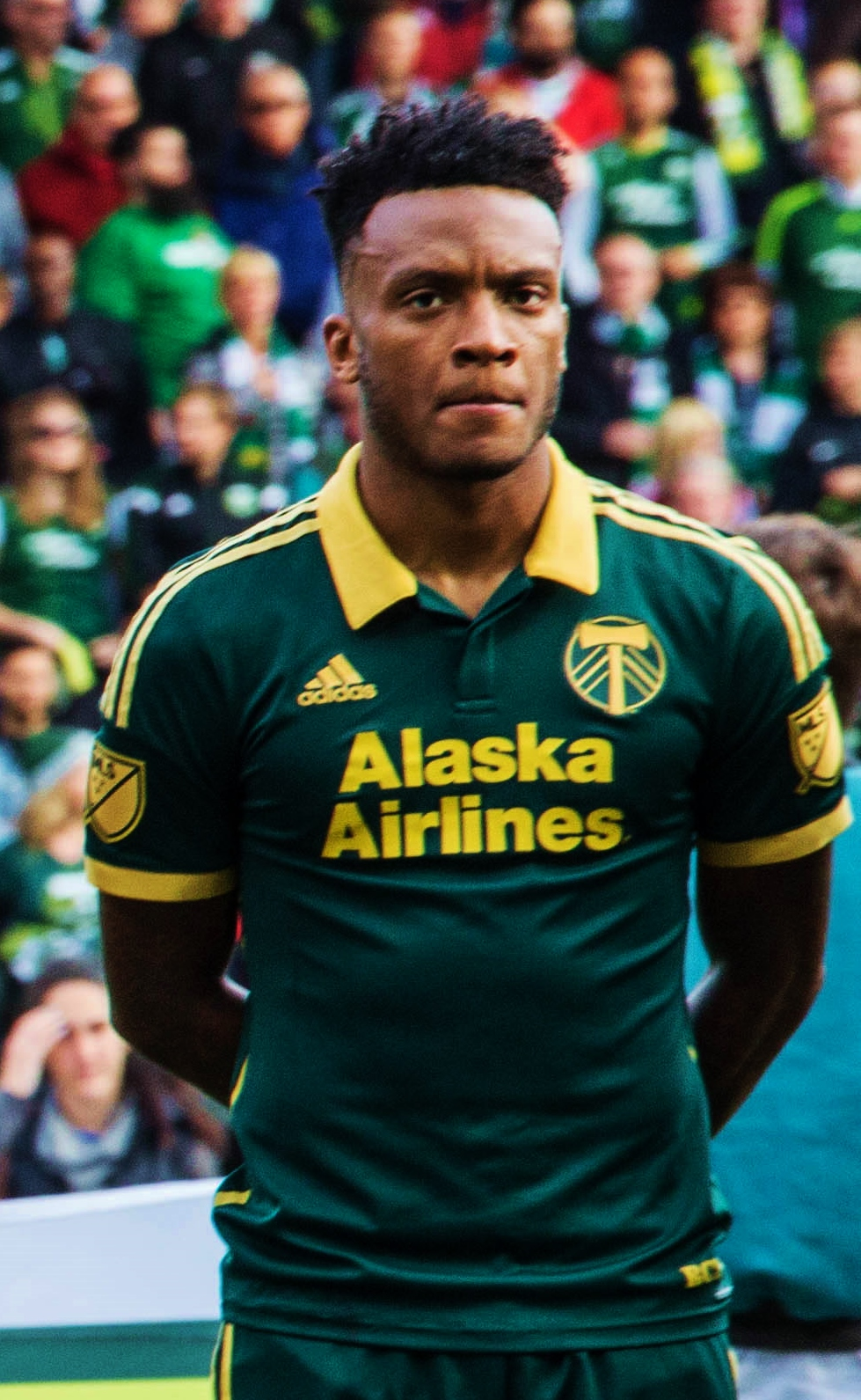
- Wallace with Portland Timbers in 2015

Personal information
- Full name: Rodney Wallace Burns
- Date of birth: 17 June 1988 (age 38)
- Place of birth: San José, Costa Rica
- Height: 1.80 m (5 ft 11 in)
- Position: Winger

Youth career
- 2007–2008: Maryland Terrapins

Senior career*
Years	Team	Apps	(Gls)
2009–2010	D.C. United	39	(3)
2011–2015	Portland Timbers	120	(16)
2014	→ Arizona United (loan)	2	(1)
2016	Arouca	2	(0)
2016	Sport Recife	24	(4)
2017–2018	New York City FC	44	(5)
2019	Sporting Kansas City	1	(0)
Total		232	(29)

International career^{‡}
2011–2018	Costa Rica	31	(4)
- * Club domestic league appearances and goals as of 20 October 2019 ‡ National team caps and goals as of 27 June 2018

Rodney Wallace Burns (born 17 June 1988) is a Costa Rican former professional footballer who played as a winger. He spent most of his professional career in the United States and played for four Major League Soccer clubs from 2009 to 2019. Wallace was drafted by D.C. United and played there for two seasons before a trade to the Portland Timbers, where he spent several years and won the MLS Cup in 2015.

Wallace also made 31 appearances for the Costa Rica national football team, including at the 2018 FIFA World Cup.

== Club career ==
=== Youth and college ===
Wallace's family moved to the United States when he was nine. He grew up in Rockville, Maryland, played for Potomac Soccer Association and attended The Bullis School, and played college soccer at the University of Maryland, College Park.

=== Professional ===
==== D.C. United ====
Wallace was drafted in the first round (6th overall) of the 2009 MLS SuperDraft by D.C. United on 15 January 2009. He made his professional debut on 22 March 2009, in D.C.'s first game of the 2009 MLS season against Los Angeles Galaxy, and scored his first career professional goal on 26 April 2009, in a 3–2 win over New York Red Bulls. As both a defender and midfielder, Wallace played 39 regular-season games and made 36 starts over his two years with D.C. United, compiling three goals and five assists.

==== Portland Timbers ====
On 24 November 2010, D.C. United traded Wallace and a fourth-round pick in the 2011 MLS SuperDraft to Portland Timbers in exchange for Dax McCarty and allocation money.

Wallace re-signed with Portland on 6 December 2012. In summer 2014, Wallace was sent on loan to USL Pro club Arizona United to regain match fitness after returning from injury.

Wallace returned to the Portland Timbers at the beginning of the 2015 season. He served as a regular starter all of the regular season. In the 2015 Audi MLS Cup playoffs, Wallace played a vital role in the team's success, scoring a goal against Sporting Kansas City in the knockout rounds. They went on to win that game in a penalty shootout 7–6 in what was the longest penalty shootout in MLS Cup playoffs history. The Timbers would go on to win the Western Conference Championship against FC Dallas and enter their first ever MLS Cup Final. Wallace came up big in the final, scoring what would go on to be the game winner in the 7th minute. The final score was 2–1.

==== Arouca ====
Wallace signed with Portuguese Primeira Liga side F.C. Arouca in January 2016.

==== Sport Recife ====
Two months after signing with Arouca, on 30 March 2016, Sport Recife signed Wallace on a two-year contract, expiring at the end of the 2017 season. According to some Brazilian sources, the transfer fee between Sport Recife and Arouca was 200,000 euros. Wallace went on to make 24 appearances for Sport Recife, scoring four goals in the 2016 season.

Following rumors in the beginning of January 2017 that Wallace had no intentions of returning to Brazil, Wallace failed to report to the first day of preseason on 9 January 2017. Sport Recife subsequently set a deadline of 13 January 2017, for Wallace to return or present a plausible reason for non-attendance. On 16 January 2017, Wallace responded asking to be released. While Wallace and Sport Recife remained at an impasse for nearly a month, rumors began to swirl of a possible return to his former club, Portland Timbers. Wallace and Sport Recife finally reached resolution when he returned to Brazil and re-paid the club's 200,000 euro transfer fee on 1 February 2017. Sport Recife released Wallace from his contract the next day on 2 February 2017. Following his release, rumors have continued to persist of a possible return to the Timbers.

==== New York City FC ====
Wallace signed with New York City FC on 15 February 2017. He scored his first goal for the club on 12 March, in a 4–0 win over D.C. United.

==== Sporting Kansas City ====
On 14 December 2018, Wallace signed one-year contract with Sporting Kansas City. He was out of contract after the 2019 season.

==== Retirement ====
After nearly two-years without a club, Wallace officially retired on 13 August 2021. He signed a ceremonial one-day contract with Portland Timbers allowing him to officially retire as a Timbers player.

== International career ==
During his first season in Portland, Wallace established himself as a starter at left midfield for the expansion club. His efforts earned him a call to represent Costa Rica in September. He made his international debut on 2 September 2011 at the Home Depot Center in Carson, California, and scored the only goal in a 1–0 victory over the United States.

In May 2018 he was named in Costa Rica's 23 man squad for the 2018 FIFA World Cup in Russia. This was the third time a member of his family played at a FIFA World Cup, as his relative Harold Wallace played in both the 2002 and 2006 World Cups. He appeared as a substitute in Costa Rica's final group stage game, a 2–2 draw with Switzerland.

== Career statistics ==
=== International ===
As of 27 June 2018

Costa Rica
Year	Apps	Goals
2011	4	2
2012	5	0
2013	7	1
2014	1	0
2016	2	0
2017	9	1
2018	3	0
Total	31	4

=== International goals ===
Scores and results list. Costa Rica's goal tally first (includes one unofficial goal).

#	Date	Venue	Opponent	Score	Result	Competition
1.	2 September 2011	Home Depot Center, Carson, United States	United States	1–0	1–0	Friendly
2.	22 December 2011	Estadio Metropolitano, Barquisimeto, Venezuela	Venezuela	1–0	2–0	Friendly
3.	25 January 2013	Estadio Nacional de Costa Rica, San José, Costa Rica	El Salvador	1–0	1–0	2013 Copa Centroamericana
4.	14 July 2017	Toyota Stadium, Frisco, United States	French Guiana	2–0	3–0	2017 CONCACAF Gold Cup

== Personal life ==
Wallace holds a U.S. green card which qualifies him as a domestic player for MLS roster purposes.

He is a relative of former footballer Harold Wallace; while some sources report that Rodney is Harold's nephew, other sources indicate that they are cousins.

== Honours ==
University of Maryland

- NCAA Division I Men's Soccer Championship: 2008

Portland Timbers

- MLS Cup: 2015
- Western Conference (playoffs): 2015
- Western Conference (regular season): 2013

Individual

- MLS Comeback Player of the Year Award: 2014
