= Mohammed Saeid =

Sweden-born Eritrean footballer (born 1990)

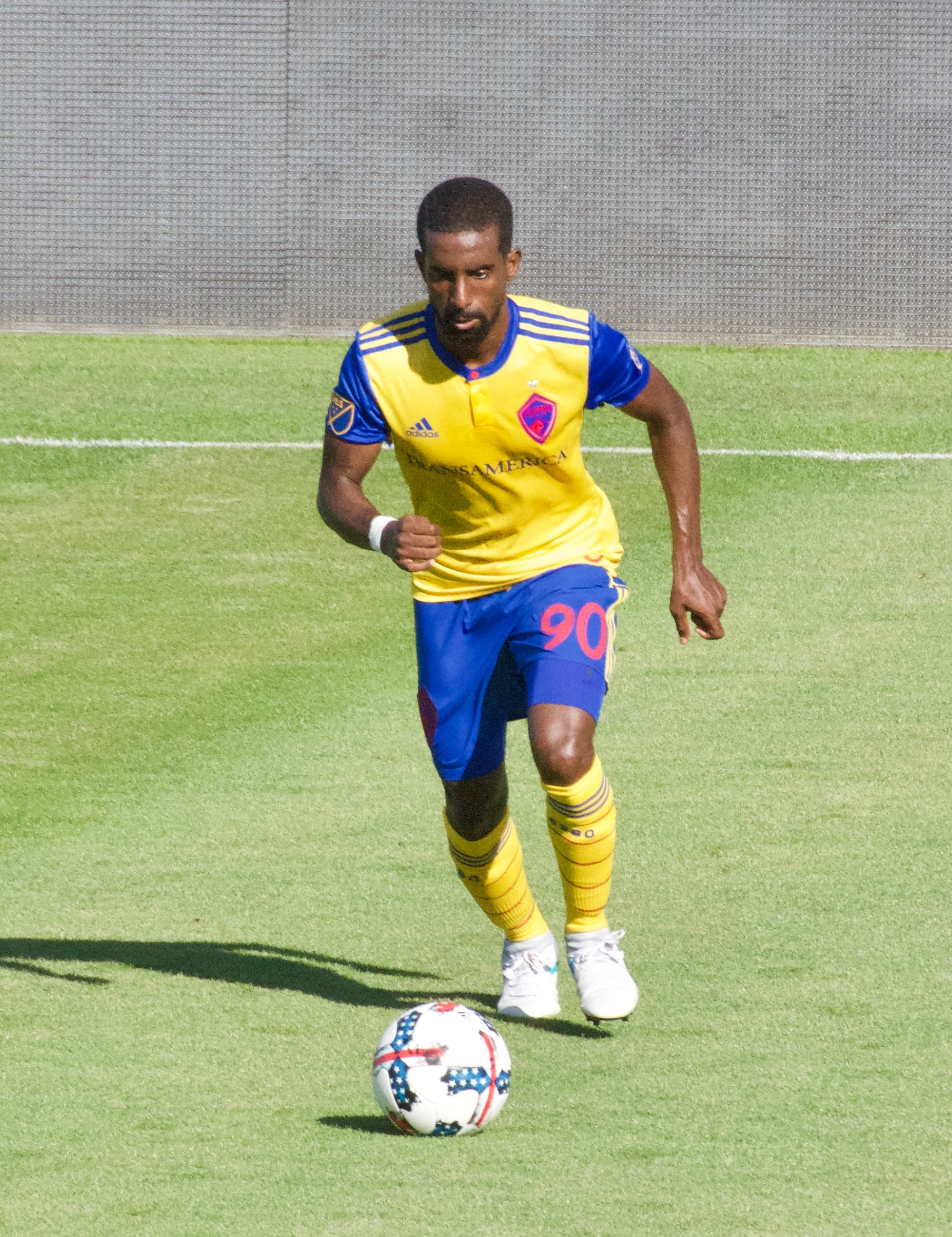
- Saeid with the Colorado Rapids in 2017

Personal information
- Full name: Mohammed Khalid Saeid
- Date of birth: 24 December 1990 (age 35)
- Place of birth: Örebro, Sweden
- Height: 1.70 m (5 ft 7 in)
- Position: Midfielder

Youth career
- –2002: BK Forward
- 2002–2009: West Bromwich Albion

Senior career*
Years	Team	Apps	(Gls)
2009–2011	BK Forward	56	(8)
2012–2014	Örebro SK	68	(7)
2015–2016	Columbus Crew	50	(0)
2017	Minnesota United	3	(0)
2017	Colorado Rapids	29	(1)
2018	Lyngby BK	6	(0)
2018–2021	IK Sirius	76	(13)
2021–2023	Trelleborg	66	(5)
2024	Örebro SK	21	(2)

International career^{‡}
2019	Eritrea	1	(0)
- * Club domestic league appearances and goals as of 15 November 2024 ‡ National team caps and goals as of 10 September 2019

Mohammed Khalid Saeid (born 24 December 1990) is a former professional footballer who played as a midfielder. Born in Sweden, he has represented the Eritrea national team.

== Career ==
Saeid was spotted at age eleven by Fulham while playing in a tournament with his team BK Forward. The English club brought him over to play with their youth team but ended up not signing him. Instead scouts from West Bromwich Albion who had watched him play for Fulham offered him a youth contract.

In 2009, he returned to his old Swedish third tier club BK Forward. Saeid played three seasons there and had a very successful 2011 where he scored eight goals from midfield. This caused Allsvenskan clubs like AIK, Malmö FF and Mjällby AIF to show interest in signing him. In the end he chose to stay in Örebro and signed with Örebro SK at the start of 2012. Saeid joined the Columbus Crew upon the expiration of his contract in December.

On 14 March 2015, Saeid made his debut and first career start for Columbus Crew in place of center midfielder Tony Tchani who was serving a one-game suspension. Saied played 76 minutes in the Crew's 2-0 victory over Toronto FC.

On 31 March 2017 Minnesota United FC traded Saeid, Joshua Gatt, and an international roster spot to Colorado Rapids for Marc Burch and Sam Cronin.

On 29 December 2017, it was announced that Saeid would join Danish Superliga side Lyngby BK ahead of their 2018 season.

On 3 August 2018, Saeid transferred to IK Sirius in Allsvenskan, signing a deal running until 2021.

On 11 August 2021, Saeid signed with Trelleborg until the end of 2023.

On 18 January 2024, Saeid returned to Örebro SK on a one-year contract with an optional year.

On 8 November 2024, Saeid announced that he will end his career after this season.

== International career ==
Saeid joined the Eritrea national team in September 2019 for the 2022 FIFA World Cup qualifiers. He made his debut on 10 September 2019 in a game against Namibia. He started the game and played the first 81 minutes of the game as Eritrea was eliminated from the competition.

== Personal life ==
Saeid was born in Sweden, the child of refugees from Eritrea. He is a Muslim.
