= 2017 Columbus Crew SC season =

Columbus Crew SC
2017 season
- Investor-operators: Anthony Precourt
- Head coach: Gregg Berhalter
- Stadium: MAPFRE Stadium
- Major League Soccer: Conference: 5th Overall: 5th
- MLS Cup playoffs: Conference finals
- U.S. Open Cup: Fourth round
- Top goalscorer: League: Ola Kamara (18); All: Ola Kamara (19)
- Highest home attendance: 21,289 (11/21 v. TOR)
- Lowest home attendance: 10,318 (5/10 v. TOR)
- Average home league attendance: 15,693 (78.6%)
- Biggest win: CLB 3–0 SEA (5/31); CLB 4–1 MTL (6/24); CLB 4–1 NYC (10/31)
- Biggest defeat: TOR 5–0 CLB (5/26)
Home colors	Away colors

The 2017 Columbus Crew SC season was the club's 22nd season of existence and their 22nd consecutive season in Major League Soccer, the top flight of soccer in the United States and Canada. The first match of the season was on March 4 against Chicago Fire. It was the fourth season under head coach Gregg Berhalter.

== Review ==
Crew SC won the Carolina Challenge Cup by going 2–1–0, defeating Seattle Sounders FC in the final game to clinch the title. On August 26, the club won the Lamar Hunt Pioneer Cup with a 2–1 victory over FC Dallas, their second straight year claiming the series and third time in five seasons.

Columbus finished fifth in the Eastern Conference, qualifying for the playoffs for the 14th time in club history. Crew SC eliminated Atlanta United FC and New York City FC, but fell 1–0 on aggregate to Toronto FC in the conference finals.

== Roster ==
As of October 1, 2017

Note: Flags indicate national team as defined under FIFA eligibility rules; some limited exceptions apply. Players may hold more than one non-FIFA nationality.

No.	Pos.	Nation	Player
2	DF	FIN	Jukka Raitala (INT)
3	DF	USA	Josh Williams
4	DF	GHA	Jonathan Mensah (INT; DP)
5	MF	USA	Dilly Duka
7	MF	BRA	Artur (INT)
8	MF	GHA	Mohammed Abu (INT)
9	FW	IRQ	Justin Meram
10	FW	ARG	Federico Higuaín (DP)
11	FW	NOR	Ola Kamara (INT)
12	FW	USA	Adam Jahn
14	DF	CRC	Waylon Francis
16	MF	USA	Hector Jiménez
17	DF	GHA	Lalas Abubakar (SUP)
18	MF	PAN	Cristian Martínez (INT)

No.	Pos.	Nation	Player
19	FW	GAM	Kekuta Manneh
20	MF	USA	Wil Trapp (Captain; HGP)
21	DF	USA	Alex Crognale (HGP; SUP)
22	DF	ARG	Gastón Sauro (INT)
23	GK	USA	Zack Steffen
25	DF	GHA	Harrison Afful (INT)
26	MF	USA	Ben Swanson (HGP; SUP)
27	MF	USA	Abuchi Obinwa (SUP)
28	MF	DEN	Niko Hansen (SUP)
29	MF	USA	Marshall Hollingsworth (SUP)
30	GK	USA	Logan Ketterer (SUP)
31	DF	USA	Connor Maloney (SUP)
32	MF	POR	Pedro Santos (INT; DP)
41	GK	USA	Brad Stuver

=== Out on loan ===
Note: Flags indicate national team as defined under FIFA eligibility rules; some limited exceptions apply. Players may hold more than one non-FIFA nationality.

No.	Pos.	Nation	Player
-	MF	GUA	Rodrigo Saravia (on loan to IK Frej)

== Technical Staff ==
Position	Staff
President, Precourt Sports Ventures	(United States) Dave Greeley
President of Business Operations	(United States) Andy Loughnane
Director of Soccer Operations	(United States) Asher Mendelsohn
Sporting Director/Head Coach	(United States) Gregg Berhalter
Assistant Coach	(Spain) Nico Estévez
Assistant Coach	(Canada) Pat Onstad
Assistant Coach	(United States) Josh Wolff
High Performance Director	(United States) Steve Tashjian
Strength/Conditioning Coach	(United States) Brook Hamilton
Director of Team Operations	(United States) Zach Crusse
Head Equipment Manager	(United States) David Brauzer
Team Operations Assistant	(United States) Ron Meadors
Head Athletic Trainer	(United States) Jon MacGregor
Assistant Trainer	(United States) Chris Shenberger
Performance Analyst	(Netherlands) David Handgraaf
Team Coordinator	(United States) Julio Velasquez
Data Analyst	(United States) Alex Mysiw

Source: []

== Non-competitive ==
The Crew started preseason in Columbus and traveled to Brazil and South Carolina before returning to Ohio. The Crew brought in the following academy players during training camp: Louis Bulger and Deihnia Sarnor.

=== Preseason ===
January 29 Friendly	São Paulo FC	7–0	Columbus Crew SC	São Paulo, Brazil
	Cícero; Mendes; Nem; Chávez; Gilberto (pen.); Neilton; Wesley	Report		Stadium: Centro de Treinamento Frederico Antônio Germano Menzen

February 3 Friendly	Grêmio Osasco	3–0	Columbus Crew SC	Osasco, Brazil
		Report

February 6 Friendly	Ituano FC	2–1	Columbus Crew SC	Itu, Brazil
	Romarinho; Bassani	Report	(pen.)

February 18 Carolina Challenge Cup	Atlanta United FC	1–2	Columbus Crew SC	Charleston, SC
4:30 PM EST	Martínez 6'	Report	Higuaín 57', 62'; Trapp (yellow card) 69'; Abubakar (yellow card) 72'; Crognale (yellow card) 90'	Stadium: MUSC Health Stadium

February 22 Carolina Challenge Cup	Charleston Battery	1–1	Columbus Crew SC	Charleston, SC
5:00 PM EST	Marini (yellow card) 12'; Chang (yellow card) 22'; Williams (yellow card) 24'; Lasso 25'; Mueller (yellow card) 61'	Report	Jonathan (yellow card) 8'; Afful (yellow card) 23'; 63' (o.g.); Abu (yellow card) 79'; Abubakar (yellow card) 83'	Stadium: MUSC Health Stadium

February 25 Carolina Challenge Cup	Seattle Sounders FC	0–1	Columbus Crew SC	Charleston, SC
4:30 PM EST	Alonso (yellow card) 46'; Roldan (yellow card) 89'	Report	Trapp (yellow card) 15'; Hansen 82'	Stadium: MUSC Health Stadium

=== Midseason ===
Crew academy player Louis Bulger joined the Crew as a guest player against Akron Zips, Emmanuel Sabbi joined the Crew as a guest player against Pittsburgh Riverhounds on April 30.

March 5 Friendly	Columbus Crew SC	0–0	Akron Zips	Obetz, OH
		Report		Stadium: Crew Training Center

March 21 Friendly	Columbus Crew SC	3–2	Pittsburgh Riverhounds	Obetz, OH
	Higuaín 5'; Hansen 7'; Jahn 41'	Report	6'; Howell 53'	Stadium: Crew Training Center

April 2 Friendly	Columbus Crew SC	3–0	Michigan State Spartans	Obetz, OH
	Jahn 7'; Hansen 25'; Manneh 31'	Report		Stadium: Crew Training Center

April 30 Friendly	Columbus Crew SC	1–2	Pittsburgh Riverhounds	Obetz, OH
	Hansen 4'	Report	Walsh 19'; 53'	Stadium: Crew Training Center
Note: Played with 40 minute halves

July 17 Friendly	Columbus Crew SC	1–0	Eintracht Frankfurt	Columbus, OH
7:30 PM EDT	Abu (yellow card) 18'; Kamara 26'; Martínez (yellow card) 39'	Report	Fernandes (yellow card) 66'; Jović (yellow card) 74'	Stadium: MAPFRE Stadium; Attendance: 11,301; Referee: Guido Gonzalez Jr. Assistant referees: Cory Richardson; Art Arustamyan; Fourth official: Brandon Artis

September 9 Friendly	Columbus Crew SC	2–1	Pittsburgh Riverhounds	Obetz, OH
	Manneh 4'; Santos 11'	Report	53' (pen.)	Stadium: Crew Training Center
Note: Played with 30 minute halves

== Competitive ==
=== Overview ===
Competition	First match	Last match	Starting round	Final position	Record							
Competition	First match	Last match	Starting round	Final position	Pld	W	D	L	GF	GA	GD	Win %
Major League Soccer	March 4, 2017	October 22, 2017	Matchday 1	5th	34	16	6	12	53	49	+4	47.06
MLS Cup Playoffs	October 26, 2017	November 29, 2017	Knockout Round	Conference Finals	5	1	2	2	4	4	+0	20.00
U.S. Open Cup	June 14, 2017	June 14, 2017	Fourth Round	Fourth Round	1	0	0	1	0	1	−1	0.00
Total					40	17	8	15	57	54	+3	42.50

Source: Competitions

=== MLS ===
==== Standings ====
===== Eastern Conference =====
Pos	Team	Pld	W	L	T	GF	GA	GD	Pts	Qualification
3	Chicago Fire	34	16	11	7	62	48	+14	55	Qualification for the knockout round
4	Atlanta United FC	34	15	9	10	70	40	+30	55	Qualification for the knockout round
5	Columbus Crew	34	16	12	6	53	49	+4	54	Qualification for the knockout round
6	New York Red Bulls	34	14	12	8	53	47	+6	50	Qualification for the knockout round
7	New England Revolution	34	13	15	6	53	61	−8	45	

Source: MLS

===== Overall table =====
Pos	Team	Pld	W	L	T	GF	GA	GD	Pts
3	Chicago Fire	34	16	11	7	61	47	+14	55
4	Atlanta United FC	34	15	9	10	70	40	+30	55
5	Columbus Crew	34	16	12	6	53	49	+4	54
6	Portland Timbers	34	15	11	8	60	50	+10	53
7	Seattle Sounders FC	34	14	9	11	52	39	+13	53

Source: MLS
Rules for classification: 1) points; 2) total wins; 3) total goal differential; 4) total goals scored; 5) disciplinary points; 6) away goals scored; 7) away goal differential; 8) coin toss or drawing of lots

==== Results summary ====
Overall								Home						Away					
Pld	Pts	W	L	T	GF	GA	GD	W	L	T	GF	GA	GD	W	L	T	GF	GA	GD
34	54	16	12	6	53	49	+4	12	3	2	34	17	+17	4	9	4	19	32	−13

Source: MLS standings
Pld = Matches played; Pts = Points; W = Matches won; T = Matches tied; L = Matches lost; GF = Goals for; GA = Goals against; GD = Goal difference

==== Results by round ====
Round	1	2	3	4	5	6	7	8	9	10	11	12	13	14	15	16	17	18	19	20	21	22	23	24	25	26	27	28	29	30	31	32	33	34
Stadium	H	A	A	H	H	A	H	A	H	H	H	A	A	A	H	A	A	H	H	A	H	A	A	A	H	A	H	H	H	A	H	H	A	A
Result	D	L	W	W	W	L	W	L	L	W	L	W	L	L	W	L	L	W	L	W	W	L	D	L	W	D	W	W	D	D	W	W	W	D

Source: Columbus schedule
A = Away; H = Home; W = Win; D = Draw; L = Loss

==== Match results ====
March 4 1	Columbus Crew SC	1–1	Chicago Fire	Columbus, OH
2:00 PM EST	Finlay 17'; Higuaín (yellow card) 41'	Report	Accam 73'; Goossens (yellow card) 81'	Stadium: MAPFRE Stadium; Attendance: 15,023; Referee: Fotis Bazakos; Assistant referees: Danny Thornberry; Kevin Klinger; Fourth official: Mark Kadlecik

March 11 2	Houston Dynamo	3–1	Columbus Crew SC	Houston, TX
8:30 PM EST	Quioto 2'; Elis 35', (yellow card) 68'; Torres 65'	Report	Finlay (yellow card) 59': Raitala (yellow card) 72'; Jonathan (red card) 87'; Kamara 90+3'	Stadium: BBVA Compass Stadium; Attendance: 16,486; Referee: Chris Penso; Assistant referees: Adam Garner; Nick Uranga; Fourth official: Daniel Radford

March 18 3	D.C. United	0–2	Columbus Crew SC	Washington, D.C.
7:00 PM EDT	Harkes (yellow card) 17'; Sam (yellow card) 41'; Sarvas (yellow card) 70'	Report	Higuaín 38' (pen.); Afful (yellow card) 45+2'; Kamara 66' (pen.); Williams (yellow card) 72'	Stadium: Robert F. Kennedy Memorial Stadium; Attendance: 14,031; Referee: Ted Unkel; Assistant referees: Adam Wienckowski; Andrew Bigelow; Fourth official: Jorge Gonzalez

March 25 4	Columbus Crew SC	3–2	Portland Timbers	Columbus, OH
7:30 PM EDT	Meram 11'; Kamara 19'; Trapp (yellow card) 26'; Artur (yellow card) 63'; Hansen 84'	Report	Asprilla 4'; Chará (yellow card) 25'; Adi 45+3'; Blanco (yellow card) 68'; Valeri (yellow card) 70'	Stadium: MAPFRE Stadium; Attendance: 11,067; Referee: Silviu Petrescu; Assistant referees: Jason White; Craig Lowry; Fourth official: Sorin Stoica

April 1 5	Columbus Crew SC	2–0	Orlando City SC	Columbus, OH
4:00 PM EDT	Meram 13', 77', (yellow card) 19'	Report	Carrasco (yellow card) 60'; Redding (yellow card) 76'	Stadium: MAPFRE Stadium; Attendance: 12,226; Referee: José Carlos Rivero; Assistant referees: Jeffrey Greeson; Brian Poeschel; Fourth official: Chris Penso

April 8 6	Chicago Fire	1–0	Columbus Crew SC	Bridgeview, IL
2:00 PM EDT	Nikolić 22'; McCarty (yellow card) 86'	Report	Crognale (yellow card) 84'	Stadium: Toyota Park; Attendance: 16,434; Referee: Alan Kelly; Assistant referees: Matt Nelson; Eric Weisbrod; Fourth official: Sorin Stoica

April 15 7	Columbus Crew SC	2–1	Toronto FC	Columbus, OH
8:00 PM EDT	Kamara 37'; Meram 43'; Raitala (yellow card) 90+2'	Report	Altidore 21'; Bradley (yellow card) 79'	Stadium: MAPFRE Stadium; Attendance: 12,319; Referee: Nima Saghafi; Assistant referees: Corey Rockwell; Kyle Atkins; Fourth official: Hilario Grajeda

April 22 8	New York Red Bulls	2–0	Columbus Crew SC	Harrison, NJ
7:30 PM EDT	Muyl 11'; Royer 38' (pen.), (yellow card) 72'; Robles (yellow card) 63'; Wright-Phillips (yellow card) 68'	Report	Finlay (yellow card) 83'	Stadium: Red Bull Arena; Attendance: 20,008; Referee: Jorge Gonzalez; Assistant referees: Jeff Muschik; Gianni Facchini; Fourth official: Sorin Stoica

April 29 9	Columbus Crew SC	2–3	New York City FC	Columbus, OH
7:30PM EDT	Higuaín 29'; Raitala (yellow card) 44'; Kamara 49'	Report	Sweat (yellow card) 2'; Harrison 8', 76'; Herrera (yellow card) 17', (goal) 64'; Chanot (yellow card) 79'	Stadium: MAPFRE Stadium; Attendance: 17,336; Referee: Chris Penso; Assistant referees: Nick Uranga; Jeremy Hanson; Fourth official: Younes Marrakchi

May 6 10	Columbus Crew SC	2–0	New England Revolution	Columbus, OH
7:30 PM EDT	Kamara 13'; Jonathan (yellow card) 15'; Higuaín 53'; Næss (yellow card) 69'	Report	Watson (yellow card) 77'; Delamea (yellow card) 81'	Stadium: MAPFRE Stadium; Attendance: 13,340; Referee: Mark Geiger; Assistant referees: Peter Manikowski; Felisha Mariscal; Fourth official: Fotis Bazakos

May 10 11	Columbus Crew SC	1–2	Toronto FC	Columbus, OH
7:30 PM EDT	Higuaín 28' (pen.); Steffen (yellow card) 37'; Jahn (yellow card) 82'	Report	Ricketts 81', 90'	Stadium: MAPFRE Stadium; Attendance: 10,318; Referee: Sorin Stoica; Assistant referees: Claudiu Badea; Logan Brown; Fourth official: Hilario Grajeda

May 13 12	Montreal Impact	2–3	Columbus Crew SC	Montreal, QC
5:00 PM EDT	Piatti 52'; Ballou (yellow card) 57'; Jackson-Hamel 77'; Duvall (yellow card) 89'	Report	Meram 14', 28', 90+1'; Jahn (yellow card) 31'; Steffen (yellow card) 52'; Higuaín (yellow card) 58'	Stadium: Stade Saputo; Attendance: 17,508; Referee: Silviu Petrescu; Assistant referees: Daniel Belleau; Andrew Bigelow; Fourth official: Mark Kadlecik

May 21 13	New England Revolution	2–1	Columbus Crew SC	Foxborough, MA
2:30 PM EDT	Fagúndez 24', 34'; Farrell (red card) 90+3'	Report	Kamara 19'; Trapp (yellow card) 55'; Jahn (yellow card) 90+1'	Stadium: Gillette Stadium; Attendance: 18,651; Referee: Alan Kelly; Assistant referees: Corey Rockwell; Matt Nelson; Fourth official: Marcos de Oliveira

May 26 14	Toronto FC	5–0	Columbus Crew SC	Toronto, ON
7:00 PM EDT	Vázquez 6' (pen.), 59'; Morrow 39'; Delgado (red card) 81'; Osorio 86'; Hamilton 90+3'	Report	Jonathan (yellow card) 5'	Stadium: BMO Field; Attendance: 25,376; Referee: Drew Fischer; Assistant referees: Oscar Mitchell-Carvalho; Craig Lowry; Fourth official: Chris Penso

May 31 15	Columbus Crew SC	3–0	Seattle Sounders FC	Columbus, OH
7:30 PM EDT	Higuaín 10'; Meram 21'; Kamara 59'; Jonathan (yellow card) 67'	Report	Adekoya (yellow card) 3'	Stadium: MAPFRE Stadium; Attendance: 12,773; Referee: David Gantar; Assistant referees: C.J. Morgante; Peter Manikowski; Fourth official: Fotis Bazakos

June 3 16	Colorado Rapids	2–1	Columbus Crew SC	Commerce City, CO
9:00 PM EDT	Doyle (yellow card) 48', (goal) 80'; Ford (yellow card) 73'; Azira (yellow card) 79'; Gordon 86'	Report	Higuaín 61'	Stadium: Dick's Sporting Goods Park; Attendance: 17,586; Referee: Ismail Elfath; Assistant referees: Eric Weisbrod; Kathryn Nesbitt; Fourth official: Juan Guzman

June 17 17	Atlanta United FC	3–1	Columbus Crew SC	Atlanta, GA
7:00 PM EDT	Villalba 16'; Carmona (yellow card) 21'; Asad (yellow card) 54'; Almirón 67'; Martínez 88'	Report	Higuaín 26'; Afful (yellow card) 53'	Stadium: Bobby Dodd Stadium; Attendance: 44,922; Referee: Ricardo Salazar; Assistant referees: Andrew Bigelow; Peter Balciunas; Fourth official: Mark Kadlecik

June 24 18	Columbus Crew SC	4–1	Montreal Impact	Columbus, OH
7:30 PM EDT	Higuaín 17', 88'; Meram (yellow card) 45+1'; Manneh 70'; Kamara 72'; Afful (yellow card) 78'	Report	Fisher (yellow card) 16'; Jackson-Hamel 19'; Camara (yellow card) 34'	Stadium: MAPFRE Stadium; Attendance: 16,592; Referee: Armando Villarreal; Assistant referees: Nick Uranga; Corey Parker; Fourth official: Robert Sibiga

July 1 19	Columbus Crew SC	0–2	Atlanta United FC	Columbus, OH
7:30 PM EDT	Meram (yellow card) 29'	Report	Villalba 27', 64'; Kann (yellow card) 84'	Stadium: MAPFRE Stadium; Attendance: 20,391; Referee: Hilario Grajeda; Assistant referees: Corey Rockwell; Kyle Longville; Fourth official: Younes Marrakchi

July 4 20	Minnesota United FC	0–1	Columbus Crew SC	Minneapolis, MN
7:00 PM EDT	Ibson (yellow card) 9'	Report	Manneh 58'; Steffen (yellow card) 90+1'	Stadium: TCF Bank Stadium; Attendance: 18,564; Referee: Rubiel Vazquez; Assistant referees: Craig Lowry; Jeff Muschik; Fourth official: Ricardo Salazar

July 22 21	Columbus Crew SC	1–0	Philadelphia Union	Columbus, OH
7:30 PM EDT	Meram 65'	Report	Elliott (yellow card) 68'	Stadium: MAPFRE Stadium; Attendance: 17,418; Referee: Silviu Petrescu; Assistant referees: Philippe Brière; Eric Boria; Fourth official: Fotis Bazakos

July 26 22	Philadelphia Union	3–0	Columbus Crew SC	Chester, PA
7:30 PM EDT	Ilsinho 20'; Wijnaldum (yellow card) 31'; Gaddis (yellow card) 39'; Sapong 66'; Epps 81'	Report	Jonathan (red card) 35'; Abubakar (yellow card) 36', (red card) 76'	Stadium: Talen Energy Stadium; Attendance: 15,413; Referee: Ismail Elfath; Assistant referees: Peter Manikowski; Logan Brown; Fourth official: José Carlos Rivero

July 29 23	Real Salt Lake	2–2	Columbus Crew SC	Sandy, UT
8:00 PM EDT	Plata 50' (pen.); Savarino 53'; Saucedo (yellow card) 88'	Report	Kamara 15', 60'	Stadium: Rio Tinto Stadium; Attendance: 18,758; Referee: Kevin Stott; Assistant referees: Brian Poeschel; T.J. Zablocki; Fourth official: Baboucarr Jallow

August 5 24	San Jose Earthquakes	2–1	Columbus Crew SC	San Jose, CA
10:30 PM EDT	Ureña 42'; Wondolowski 56'; Salinas (yellow card) 90+1'	Report	Jonathan (yellow card) 26'; Jahn 76'	Stadium: Avaya Stadium; Attendance: 18,000; Referee: Alan Kelly; Assistant referees: Mike Kampmeinert; Brian Dunn; Fourth official: Alex Chilowicz

August 12 25	Columbus Crew SC	3–1	Chicago Fire	Columbus, OH
7:30 PM EDT	Manneh 18'; Meram (yellow card) 59', (goal) 73'; Jonathan (yellow card) 67'; Kamara 88' (pen.)	Report	de Leeuw 13'; Meira (yellow card) 26'; Polster (yellow card) 73'; Lampson (yellow card) 89'	Stadium: MAPFRE Stadium; Attendance: 18,690; Referee: Armando Villarreal; Assistant referees: Corey Parker; Kevin Klinger; Fourth official: Younes Marrakchi

August 19 26	Orlando City SC	1–1	Columbus Crew SC	Orlando, FL
7:30 PM EDT	Yotún (yellow card) 28'; Barnes 67'	Report	Abubakar (yellow card) 16', (goal) 35'; Martínez (yellow card) 55'; Afful (red card) 77'; Abu (yellow card) 81'; Meram (yellow card) 88'	Stadium: Orlando City Stadium; Attendance: 25,527; Referee: Juan Guzman Jr. Assistant referees: Brian Dunn; Jeff Muschik; Fourth official: Caleb Mendez

August 23 27	Columbus Crew SC	2–0	LA Galaxy	Columbus, OH
7:30 PM EDT	Kamara 45'; Trapp (yellow card) 56'; Pedro Santos (yellow card) 59'; Martínez (yellow card) 81'; Meram 90'	Report	Cole (red card) 17'; dos Santos (yellow card) 35'	Stadium: MAPFRE Stadium; Attendance: 12,150; Referee: Sorin Stoica; Assistant referees: Ian Anderson; Craig Lowry; Fourth official: Marcos de Oliveira

August 26 28	Columbus Crew SC	2–1	FC Dallas	Columbus, OH
7:30 PM EDT	Kamara 50'; Jonathan 71'	Report	Akindele (yellow card) 69'; Zimmerman 78'; Hedges (yellow card) 90+3'	Stadium: MAPFRE Stadium; Attendance: 18,379; Referee: Allen Chapman; Assistant referees: Jeremy Hanson; Matt Nelson; Fourth official: Ted Unkel

September 10 29	Columbus Crew SC	1–1	Sporting Kansas City	Columbus, OH
1:00 PM EDT	Jonathan (yellow card) 13'; Kamara 45+1'; Williams (yellow card) 59'; Abu (yellow card) 85'	Report	Espinoza (yellow card) 15'; Lobato 19'; Feilhaber (yellow card) 53'	Stadium: MAPFRE Stadium; Attendance: 17,089; Referee: Chris Penso; Assistant referees: Eduardo Mariscal; Adam Garner; Fourth official: Daniel Radford

September 16 30	Vancouver Whitecaps FC	2–2	Columbus Crew SC	Vancouver, BC
7:00 PM EDT	Montero 15'; Waston (yellow card) 56'; Tchani 90+2'	Report	Kamara 19'; Williams (yellow card) 26'; Abu (yellow card) 33'; Manneh 63'; Meram (yellow card) 90+1'	Stadium: BC Place; Attendance: 20,592; Referee: Silviu Petrescu; Assistant referees: Oscar Mitchell-Carvalho; Anthony Vasoli; Fourth official: Alex Chilowicz

September 23 31	Columbus Crew SC	3–2	New York Red Bulls	Columbus, OH
7:30 PM EDT	Jonathan 6'; Jiménez (yellow card) 42'; Meram 54'; Williams 66'; Higuaín (yellow card) 71'; Raitala (yellow card) 90'; Pedro Santos (yellow card) 90+2'	Report	Wright-Phillips 14', (yellow card) 73'; Lawrence (yellow card) 40'; Verón 72' (pen.); Keita (yellow card) 86'	Stadium: MAPFRE Stadium; Attendance: 20,008; Referee: Fotis Bazakos; Assistant referees: Brian Poeschel; Peter Balciunas; Fourth official: Ricardo Salazar

September 30 32	Columbus Crew SC	2–0	D.C. United	Columbus, OH
7:30 PM EDT	Williams 14'; Jonathan (yellow card) 49'; Meram 56'	Report	Canouse (yellow card) 18'	Stadium: MAPFRE Stadium; Attendance: 17,350; Referee: Ted Unkel; Assistant referees: Kathryn Nesbitt; Claudiu Badea; Fourth official: Alejandro Mariscal

October 15 33	Orlando City SC	0–1	Columbus Crew SC	Orlando, FL
5:00 PM EDT	Laryea (yellow card) 81'; Johnson (yellow card) 83'; Yotún (yellow card) 90+4'	Report	Kamara 66'; Williams (yellow card) 87'	Stadium: Orlando City Stadium; Attendance: 25,166; Referee: Chris Penso; Assistant referees: Jeff Muschik; C.J. Morgante; Fourth official: Robert Sibiga

October 22 34	New York City FC	2–2	Columbus Crew SC	New York, NY
4:00 PM EDT	Villa 18', 45'; Herrera (yellow card) 69'	Report	Kamara 11'; Williams 58'	Stadium: Citi Field; Attendance: 20,113; Referee: Ismail Elfath; Assistant referees: Brian Dunn; Oscar Mitchell-Carvalho; Fourth official: Sorin Stoica

=== MLS Cup Playoffs ===
==== Knockout Round ====
October 26 Knockout Round	Atlanta United FC	0–0 (a.e.t.) (1–3 p)	Columbus Crew SC	Atlanta, GA
7:00 PM EDT		Report	Jiménez (yellow card) 64'; Artur (yellow card) 96'	Stadium: Mercedes-Benz Stadium; Attendance: 67,221; Referee: Allen Chapman; Assistant referees: Jeremy Hanson; Andrew Bigelow; Fourth official: Chris Penso
	Penalties
	Gressel (penalty missed); González Pírez (penalty missed); Villalba (penalty scored); Larentowicz (penalty missed)		(penalty scored) Higuaín; (penalty missed) Manneh; (penalty scored) Hansen; (penalty scored) Jahn

==== Conference Semifinals ====
October 31 Leg 1	Columbus Crew SC	4–1	New York City FC	Columbus, OH
8:00 PM EDT	Kamara 6'; Artur 58'; Meram 69'; Afful 90+3'	Report	Callens (red card) 52'; Matarrita (yellow card) 64'; Villa 78'	Stadium: MAPFRE Stadium; Attendance: 14,416; Referee: Alan Kelly; Assistant referees: Matt Nelson; Brian Dunn; Fourth official: Ismail Elfath

November 5 Leg 2	New York City FC	2–0 (3–4 agg.)	Columbus Crew SC	New York, NY
5:00 PM EST	Villa 16' (pen.); Struna 53'; Wallace (yellow card) 74'	Report	Abu (yellow card) 63'	Stadium: Yankee Stadium; Attendance: 23,246; Referee: Kevin Stott; Assistant referees: Corey Rockwell; Brian Poeschel; Fourth official: Armando Villarreal

==== Conference Finals ====
November 21 Leg 1	Columbus Crew SC	0–0	Toronto FC	Columbus, OH
8:00 PM EST	Artur (yellow card) 33'; Pedro Santos (yellow card) 52'; Jonathan (yellow card) 54'	Report	Osorio (yellow card) 68'; Edwards (yellow card) 85'	Stadium: MAPFRE Stadium; Attendance: 21,289; Referee: Robert Sibiga; Assistant referees: Peter Manikowski; Ian Anderson; Fourth official: José Carlos Rivero

November 29 Leg 2	Toronto FC	1–0 (1–0 agg.)	Columbus Crew SC	Toronto, ON
7:30 PM EST	Altidore 60'; Bradley (yellow card) 78'	Report	Jonathan (yellow card) 86'	Stadium: BMO Field; Attendance: 30,392; Referee: Jair Marrufo; Assistant referees: Frank Anderson; Corey Rockwell; Fourth official: Baldomero Toledo

=== U.S. Open Cup ===
June 14 Fourth Round	FC Cincinnati (USL) (Ohio)	1–0	(Ohio) Columbus Crew SC (MLS)	Cincinnati, OH
7:00 PM EDT	Fall 64'; Hildebrandt (yellow card) 74'	Report	Francis (yellow card) 45+3'	Stadium: Nippert Stadium; Attendance: 30,160; Referee: Younes Marrakchi; Assistant referees: Cory Richardson; Noah Matos; Fourth official: Brandon Artis

== Statistics ==
=== Appearances and goals ===
Under "Apps" for each section, the first number represents the number of starts, and the second number represents appearances as a substitute.

No.	Pos	Nat	Player	Total		MLS		MLS Cup Playoffs		U.S. Open Cup	
No.	Pos	Nat	Player	Apps	Goals	Apps	Goals	Apps	Goals	Apps	Goals
2	DF	(Finland) FIN	Jukka Raitala	30	0	20+8	0	1+1	0	0+0	0
3	DF	(United States) USA	Josh Williams	28	3	19+3	3	5+0	0	0+1	0
4	DF	(Ghana) GHA	Jonathan Mensah	31	2	25+1	2	5+0	0	0+0	0
7	MF	(Brazil) BRA	Artur	28	1	19+5	0	3+0	1	1+0	0
8	MF	(Ghana) GHA	Mohammed Abu	23	0	14+6	0	2+1	0	0+0	0
9	FW	(Iraq) IRQ	Justin Meram	40	14	32+2	13	5+0	1	1+0	0
10	FW	(Argentina) ARG	Federico Higuaín	32	9	26+0	9	5+0	0	1+0	0
11	FW	(Norway) NOR	Ola Kamara	39	19	33+1	18	5+0	1	0+0	0
12	FW	(United States) USA	Adam Jahn	25	1	1+20	1	0+3	0	1+0	0
14	DF	(Costa Rica) CRC	Waylon Francis	13	0	10+2	0	0+0	0	1+0	0
16	MF	(United States) USA	Hector Jiménez	24	0	15+4	0	3+1	0	1+0	0
17	DF	(Ghana) GHA	Lalas Abubakar	10	1	6+1	1	1+2	0	0+0	0
18	MF	(Panama) PAN	Cristian Martínez	8	0	1+7	0	0+0	0	0+0	0
19	FW	(The Gambia) GAM	Kekuta Manneh	24	4	9+10	4	0+5	0	0+0	0
20	MF	(United States) USA	Wil Trapp	40	0	34+0	0	5+0	0	1+0	0
21	DF	(United States) USA	Alex Crognale	18	0	12+5	0	0+0	0	1+0	0
22	DF	(Argentina) ARG	Gastón Sauro	0	0	0+0	0	0+0	0	0+0	0
23	GK	(United States) USA	Zack Steffen	39	0	34+0	0	5+0	0	0+0	0
25	DF	(Ghana) GHA	Harrison Afful	29	1	21+3	0	5+0	1	0+0	0
26	DF	(United States) USA	Ben Swanson	0	0	0+0	0	0+0	0	0+0	0
27	MF	(United States) USA	Abuchi Obinwa	0	0	0+0	0	0+0	0	0+0	0
28	MF	(Denmark) DEN	Niko Hansen	16	1	3+11	1	0+1	0	0+1	0
29	MF	(United States) USA	Marshall Hollingsworth	0	0	0+0	0	0+0	0	0+0	0
30	GK	(United States) USA	Logan Ketterer	0	0	0+0	0	0+0	0	0+0	0
31	DF	(United States) USA	Connor Maloney	2	0	1+1	0	0+0	0	0+0	0
32	MF	(Portugal) POR	Pedro Santos	14	0	8+1	0	5+0	0	0+0	0
41	GK	(United States) USA	Brad Stuver	1	0	0+0	0	0+0	0	1+0	0
-	MF	(Guatemala) GUA	Rodrigo Saravia	0	0	0+0	0	0+0	0	0+0	0
			Own goal	0	0	-	0	-	0	-	0
Players who left Columbus during the season:
5	MF	(United States) USA	Dilly Duka	1	0	0+0	0	0+0	0	0+1	0
6	MF	(Cameroon) CMR	Tony Tchani	0	0	0+0	0	0+0	0	0+0	0
13	MF	(United States) USA	Ethan Finlay	20	1	14+5	1	0+0	0	1+0	0
24	MF	(Norway) NOR	Nicolai Næss	19	0	17+1	0	0+0	0	1+0	0

=== Disciplinary record ===
No.	Pos.	Name	MLS		MLS Cup		U.S. Open Cup		Total	
No.	Pos.	Name	Yellow card	Red card	Yellow card	Red card	Yellow card	Red card	Yellow card	Red card
2	DF	(Finland) Jukka Raitala	4	0	0	0	0	0	4	0
3	DF	(United States) Josh Williams	4	0	0	0	0	0	4	0
4	DF	(Ghana) Jonathan Mensah	7	2	2	0	0	0	9	2
7	MF	(Brazil) Artur	1	0	2	0	0	0	3	0
8	MF	(Ghana) Mohammed Abu	3	0	1	0	0	0	4	0
9	MF	(Iraq) Justin Meram	6	0	0	0	0	0	6	0
10	MF	(Argentina) Federico Higuaín	3	0	0	0	0	0	3	0
11	FW	(Norway) Ola Kamara	0	0	0	0	0	0	0	0
12	FW	(United States) Adam Jahn	3	0	0	0	0	0	3	0
14	DF	(Costa Rica) Waylon Francis	0	0	0	0	1	0	1	0
16	MF	(United States) Hector Jiménez	1	0	1	0	0	0	2	0
17	DF	(Ghana) Lalas Abubakar	2	1	0	0	0	0	2	1
18	MF	(Panama) Cristian Martínez	2	0	0	0	0	0	2	0
19	FW	(The Gambia) Kekuta Manneh	0	0	0	0	0	0	0	0
20	MF	(United States) Wil Trapp	3	0	0	0	0	0	3	0
21	DF	(United States) Alex Crognale	1	0	0	0	0	0	1	0
22	DF	(Argentina) Gastón Sauro	0	0	0	0	0	0	0	0
23	GK	(United States) Zack Steffen	3	0	0	0	0	0	3	0
25	DF	(Ghana) Harrison Afful	3	1	0	0	0	0	3	1
26	MF	(United States) Ben Swanson	0	0	0	0	0	0	0	0
27	MF	(United States) Abuchi Obinwa	0	0	0	0	0	0	0	0
28	MF	(Denmark) Niko Hansen	0	0	0	0	0	0	0	0
29	MF	(United States) Marshall Hollingsworth	0	0	0	0	0	0	0	0
30	GK	(United States) Logan Ketterer	0	0	0	0	0	0	0	0
31	DF	(United States) Connor Maloney	0	0	0	0	0	0	0	0
32	MF	(Portugal) Pedro Santos	2	0	1	0	0	0	3	0
41	GK	(United States) Brad Stuver	0	0	0	0	0	0	0	0
—	MF	(Guatemala) Rodrigo Saravia	0	0	0	0	0	0	0	0
Players who left the club during the season:
5	MF	(United States) Dilly Duka	0	0	0	0	0	0	0	0
6	MF	(Cameroon) Tony Tchani	0	0	0	0	0	0	0	0
13	MF	(United States) Ethan Finlay	2	0	0	0	0	0	2	0
24	DF	(Norway) Nicolai Næss	1	0	0	0	0	0	1	0

=== Clean sheets ===
No.	Name	MLS	MLS Cup	U.S. Open Cup	Total	Games Played		
No.	Name	23	(United States) Zack Steffen	9	2	0	11	39
30	(United States) Logan Ketterer	0	0	0	0	0		
41	(United States) Brad Stuver	0	0	0	0	1		

== Transfers ==
=== In ===
Pos.	Player	Transferred from	Fee/notes	Date	Source
DF	(Ghana) Jonathan Mensah	(Russia) Anzhi Makhachkala	Signed as a Designated Player.	January 3, 2017	
DF	(United States) Josh Williams	(Canada) Toronto FC	Selected in stage two of the 2016 MLS Re-Entry Draft	January 5, 2017	
DF	(Ghana) Lalas Abubakar	(United States) Dayton Flyers	Selected in the first round of the 2017 MLS SuperDraft	January 13, 2017	
MF	(Denmark) Niko Hansen	(United States) New Mexico Lobos	Selected in the first round of the 2017 MLS SuperDraft	January 13, 2017	
MF	(Ghana) Mohammed Abu	(Norway) Strømsgodset	Signed as a Special Discovery Player	January 24, 2017	
MF	(United States) Abuchi Obinwa	(Germany) Hannover 96	Free agent signing	January 25, 2017	
MF	(Panama) Cristian Martínez	(Panama) Chorrillo	Completed permanent transfer	January 25, 2017	
DF	(United States) Connor Maloney	(United States) Penn State Nittany Lions	Drafted in the third round of the 2017 MLS SuperDraft	February 20, 2017	
GK	(United States) Logan Ketterer	(United States) Bradley Braves	Drafted in the fourth round of the 2017 MLS SuperDraft	February 20, 2017	
FW	(The Gambia) Kekuta Manneh	(Canada) Vancouver Whitecaps FC	Traded for Tony Tchani, $225,000 in targeted allocation money, $75,000 general allocation money. If Columbus signs him to a new contract Vancouver will receive a first round pick in the 2018 MLS SuperDraft. If sold before December 31, 2018 Vancouver will receive additional general allocation money and Vancouver retains a percentage of any future transfer fee.	March 30, 2017	
MF	(Portugal) Pedro Santos	(Portugal) S.C. Braga	Signed as a Designated Player	August 8, 2017	
MF	(Brazil) Artur	(Brazil) São Paulo FC	Completed permanent transfer	December 6, 2017	
GK	(United States) Jon Kempin	(United States) LA Galaxy	Traded for a fourth round draft pick in the 2018 MLS SuperDraft	December 13, 2017	
MF	(United States) Mike Grella	(United States) Colorado Rapids	Traded for a second round draft pick in the 2019 MLS SuperDraft	December 15, 2017	

=== Loan in ===
Pos.	Player	Parent club	Length/Notes	Beginning	End	Source
MF	(Brazil) Artur	(Brazil) São Paulo	Duration of the 2017 MLS season	Feb 13, 2017	End of Season	

=== Out ===
Pos.	Player	Transferred to	Fee/notes	Date	Source
MF	(Cameroon) Tony Tchani	(Canada) Vancouver Whitecaps FC	Traded with $225,000 in targeted allocation money, $75,000 general allocation money for Kekuta Manneh	March 30, 2017	
MF	(United States) Dilly Duka	(United States) New York Red Bulls	Placed on waivers	July 10, 2017	
MF	(United States) Ethan Finlay	(United States) Minnesota United FC	Traded for $100,000 in targeted allocation money and $250,000 in general allocation money	August 9, 2017	
DF	(Norway) Nicolai Næss	(Netherlands) Heerenveen	Transfer, terms undisclosed	August 29, 2017	
GK	(United States) Logan Ketterer	(United States) Columbus Crew	Option declined	December 1, 2017	
GK	(United States) Brad Stuver	(United States) New York City FC	Option declined; Rights traded for a fourth round draft pick in the 2019 MLS SuperDraft	December 1, 2017	
DF	(Costa Rica) Waylon Francis	(United States) Seattle Sounders FC	Option declined; Rights Traded for $50,000 in general allocation money	December 1, 2017	
DF	(Argentina) Gastón Sauro	(United States) Columbus Crew	Option declined	December 1, 2017	
MF	(United States) Marshall Hollingsworth	Retired	Option declined	December 1, 2017	
MF	(United States) Abuchi Obinwa	(United States) Inter Orlando FC	Option declined	December 1, 2017	
MF	(Guatemala) Rodrigo Saravia	(United States) Swope Park Rangers	Option declined	December 1, 2017	
MF	(United States) Ben Swanson	Retired	Option declined	December 1, 2017	
FW	(The Gambia) Kekuta Manneh	(Mexico) C.F. Pachuca	Contract expired	December 1, 2017	
DF	(Finland) Jukka Raitala	(United States) Los Angeles FC	Selected in the 2017 MLS Expansion Draft; Columbus receives $50,000 in general allocation money	December 12, 2017	

=== Loan out ===
Pos.	Player	Loanee club	Length/Notes	Beginning	End	Source
MF	(Guatemala) Rodrigo Saravia	(Sweden) IK Frej	Columbus retains right to recall at any time	March 4, 2017	November 12, 2017	
MF	(United States) Marshall Hollingsworth	(United States) Pittsburgh Riverhounds	On a match-by-match basis. Columbus retains right to recall at any time.	March 4, 2017	October 15, 2017	
MF	(Panama) Cristian Martínez	(United States) Pittsburgh Riverhounds	On a match-by-match basis. Columbus retains right to recall at any time.	March 4, 2017	March 24, 2017	
MF	(United States) Ben Swanson	(United States) Pittsburgh Riverhounds	On a match-by-match basis. Columbus retains right to recall at any time.	March 4, 2017	April 20, 2017	
MF	(United States) Abuchi Obinwa	(United States) Pittsburgh Riverhounds	On a match-by-match basis. Columbus retains right to recall at any time.	March 24, 2017	October 15, 2017	
DF	(Ghana) Lalas Abubakar	(United States) Pittsburgh Riverhounds	On a match-by-match basis. Columbus retains right to recall at any time.	April 6, 2017	July 4, 2017	
MF	(Panama) Cristian Martínez	(United States) FC Cincinnati	On a match-by-match basis. Columbus retains right to recall at any time.	May 4, 2017	May 8, 2017	
DF	(United States) Connor Maloney	(United States) Pittsburgh Riverhounds	On a match-by-match basis. Columbus retains right to recall at any time.	May 19, 2017	July 4, 2017	

=== MLS Draft picks ===
Draft picks are not automatically signed to the team roster. Only those who are signed to a contract will be listed as transfers in. The picks for the Columbus Crew are listed below:

2016 Columbus Crew SC Re-Entry Draft Picks
Stage	Round	Pick	Player	Position	Team
1	1	3	(United States) Josh Williams	DF	Toronto FC

2017 Columbus Crew SC SuperDraft Picks
Round	Pick	Player	Position	College
1	5	(Ghana) Lalas Abubakar	DF	Dayton
1	9	(Denmark) Niko Hansen	FW	New Mexico
3	49	(United States) Connor Maloney	DF	Penn State
4	71	(United States) Logan Ketterer	GK	Bradley

== Awards ==
MLS Team of the Week
Week	Starters	Bench	Opponent(s)	Link
3	(United States) Zack Steffen (United States) Alex Crognale (United States) Gregg Berhalter (Coach)		(United States) D.C. United	
4	(Ghana) Harrison Afful (Argentina) Federico Higuaín (Brazil) Artur	(United States) Wil Trapp	(United States) Portland Timbers	
5	(Iraq) Justin Meram	(United States) Alex Crognale (Brazil) Artur	(United States) Orlando City SC	
7	(Norway) Nicolai Næss (Iraq) Justin Meram		(Canada) Toronto FC	
10	(Argentina) Federico Higuaín	(Norway) Nicolai Næss	(United States) New England Revolution	
11	(Iraq) Justin Meram		(Canada) Toronto FC (Canada) Montreal Impact	
14	(Argentina) Federico Higuaín	(Iraq) Justin Meram	(United States) Colorado Rapids	
16		(Iraq) Justin Meram	(United States) Atlanta United FC	
17	(Argentina) Federico Higuaín	(The Gambia) Kekuta Manneh (Norway) Ola Kamara	(Canada) Montreal Impact	
20	(United States) Alex Crognale	(Iraq) Justin Meram	(United States) Philadelphia Union	
21	(Norway) Ola Kamara	(Iraq) Justin Meram	(United States) Philadelphia Union (United States) Real Salt Lake	
23	(Ghana) Lalas Abubakar		(United States) Chicago Fire	
24		(United States) Zack Steffen	(United States) Orlando City SC	
25	(Ghana) Jonathan Mensah	(Ghana) Mohammed Abu (Norway) Ola Kamara	(United States) LA Galaxy (United States) FC Dallas	
28	(The Gambia) Kekuta Manneh	(United States) Wil Trapp	(Canada) Vancouver Whitecaps FC	
29	(United States) Josh Williams	(Argentina) Federico Higuaín	(United States) New York Red Bulls	
30	(Iraq) Justin Meram		(United States) D.C. United	
32		(United States) Wil Trapp	(United States) Orlando City SC	
33		(United States) Zack Steffen (Argentina) Federico Higuaín	(United States) New York City FC	

=== MLS Player of the Week ===
Week	Player	Opponent(s)	Link
11	(Iraq) Justin Meram	Toronto FC; Montreal Impact	

=== Postseason ===
Club Retailer of the Year

=== Crew SC Team Awards ===
- Most Valuable Player – Federico Higuaín
- Golden Boot Winner – Ola Kamara
- Defender of the Year – Zack Steffen
- Humanitarian of the Year – Jonathan Mensah
- Kirk Urso Heart Award – Josh Williams
- Crew SC Academy Player of the Year – Jensen Lukacsko

== Kits ==
Home	Away

Type	Shirt	Shorts	Socks	First appearance / Record
Home	Gold	Gold	Gold	Match 1 vs. Chicago Fire / 9-5-7
Away	Black	Black	Black	Match 2 vs. Houston Dynamo / 7-1-5
