= Zack Steffen =

American soccer player (born 1995)

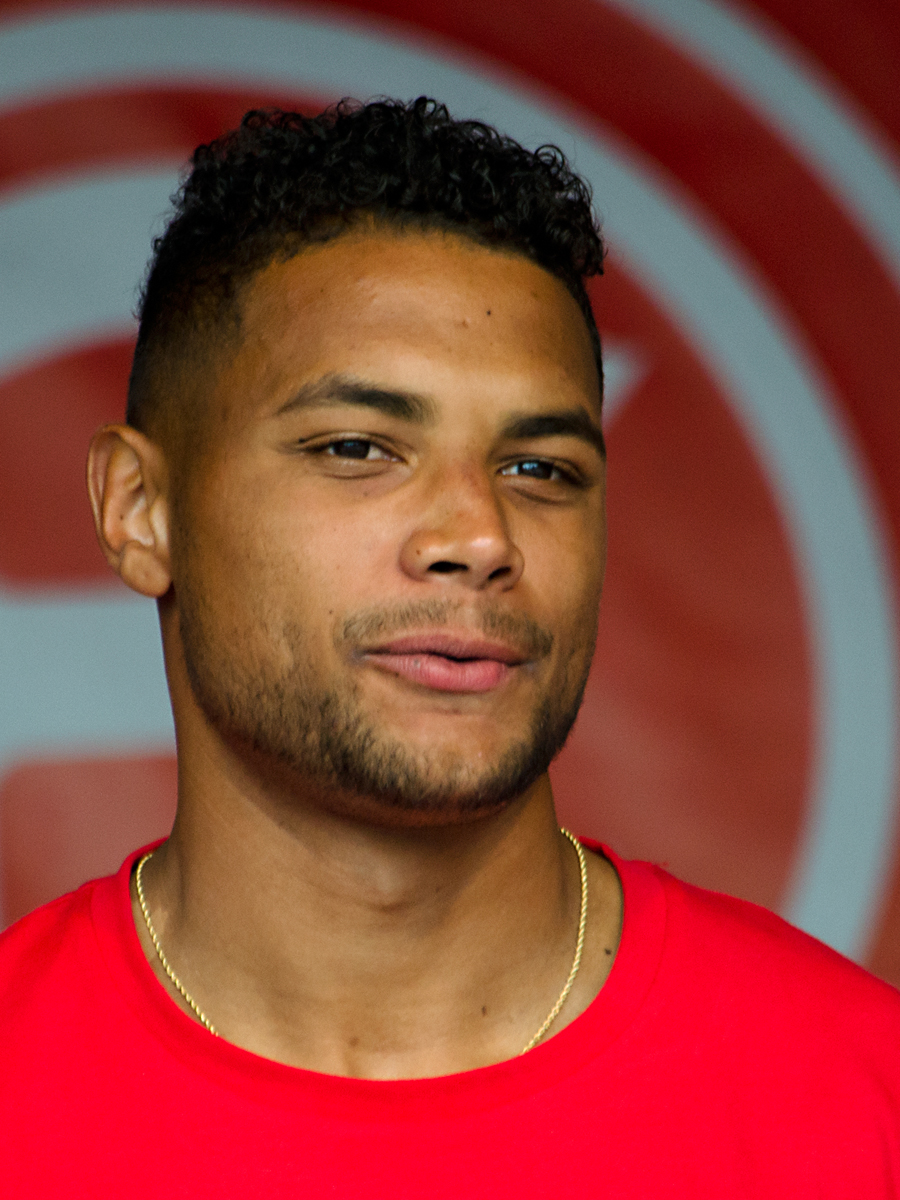
- Steffen with Fortuna Düsseldorf in 2019

Personal information
- Full name: Zackary Thomas Steffen
- Date of birth: April 2, 1995 (age 31)
- Place of birth: Coatesville, Pennsylvania, U.S.
- Height: 6 ft 3 in (1.91 m)
- Position: Goalkeeper

Team information
- Current team: Colorado Rapids
- Number: 1

Youth career
- 2000–2008: West Chester United
- 2008–2013: FC DELCO
- 2012: Philadelphia Union

College career
Years	Team	Apps	(Gls)
2013–2014	Maryland Terrapins	48	(0)

Senior career*
Years	Team	Apps	(Gls)
2015–2016	SC Freiburg II	14	(0)
2016–2019	Columbus Crew	76	(0)
2016	→ Pittsburgh Riverhounds (loan)	9	(0)
2019–2024	Manchester City	2	(0)
2019–2020	→ Fortuna Düsseldorf (loan)	17	(0)
2022–2023	→ Middlesbrough (loan)	42	(0)
2024–	Colorado Rapids	65	(0)

International career^{‡}
2012–2013	United States U18	9	(0)
2014–2015	United States U20	17	(0)
2015	United States U23	4	(0)
2018–2025	United States	30	(0)
Medal record
Representing United States
Men's soccer
CONCACAF Under-20 Championship
Runner-up	2013
CONCACAF Gold Cup
Runner-up	2019
CONCACAF Nations League
Winner	2021
- * Club domestic league appearances and goals as of May 2, 2026 ‡ National team caps and goals as of January 22, 2025

Zackary Thomas Steffen (born April 2, 1995) is an American professional soccer player who plays as a goalkeeper for Major League Soccer club Colorado Rapids.

Steffen began his youth career with West Chester United before joining the Philadelphia Union in 2012. In May 2013, Steffen committed to playing college soccer for the Maryland Terrapins. He established himself as the starting goalkeeper, spending two seasons with the Terrapins before joining German club SC Freiburg, being assigned to play with the reserves. In July 2016, Steffen returned to the United States with the Columbus Crew, joining United Soccer League club Pittsburgh Riverhounds on loan the following month. From the next season, Steffen would establish himself as the starting goalkeeper for the Columbus Crew, winning the Goalkeeper of the Year Award in 2018.

In December 2018, Steffen agreed to join Premier League club Manchester City. He signed in July 2019 before immediately being loaned to Bundesliga side Fortuna Düsseldorf for the 2019–20 season. He was the starting goalkeeper but was then sidelined for the remainder of the loan due to injuries. He returned to Manchester City the following season, serving as a backup to Ederson. In April 2021, Steffen won his first career trophy, starting in the final of the EFL Cup; he kept a clean sheet as Manchester City beat Tottenham Hotspur 1–0. In January 2024, Steffen agreed to leave Manchester City and returned to Major League Soccer for the first time since 2018, signing with the Colorado Rapids.

Steffen had represented the United States youth teams before being called into the senior squad in May 2016. He made his senior debut in January 2018 against Bosnia and Herzegovina. He was the starting goalkeeper for the United States during the 2019 CONCACAF Gold Cup, leading the side into the final where they were defeated 1–0 by Mexico. He then served as backup to Brad Guzan through the Nations League but then became the starting keeper in the finals. Steffen started the final against Mexico but was substituted in the 69th minute by Ethan Horvath after suffering a knee injury. The United States would go on to win 3–2 in extra time, earning Steffen his first international honor.

== Early life ==
Born in Coatesville, Pennsylvania, Steffen began playing soccer at the age of five with local rec league West Bradford Youth Athletics (WBYA). He began his travel soccer career as a defender with local club West Chester United. He switched to become a goalkeeper at the age of 10 after his team's keeper couldn't make it to a game. He joined FC DELCO in 2008, playing for the club in the U.S. Soccer Development Academy through high school. Steffen attended Malvern Preparatory School for his freshman and sophomore years before transferring to Downingtown West High School, appearing for the Whippets in the fall and playing with DELCO in the spring. With Downingtown, he was named the Ches-Mont League MVP as a senior while earning all-PIAA and all-American honors.

Steffen was one of the first players to come through the Philadelphia Union Academy, playing for the Union U17 team in 2012. He was part of the team that won the 2012 Generation Adidas Cup, defeating the Toronto FC Academy in a penalty shootout; the squad also included future pros Connor Maloney, Zach Pfeffer, Drew Skundrich, Brian White, and Zach Zandi, as well as future Penn State kicker Joey Julius, and was coached by Jim Curtin. Steffen was ranked as the no. 1 goalkeeper in the nation by TopDrawerSoccer.com and committed to play collegiately for coach Sasho Cirovski and the Maryland Terrapins, part of a class that ranked third nationally and also included Alex Crognale, Daniel Johnson, and Chris Odoi-Atsem.

== College career ==
On May 29, 2013, Steffen was officially unveiled as part of Maryland's 2013 recruiting class. He made his collegiate debut on August 30, making three saves as part of a 3–3 draw with no. 20 Stanford. Steffen went on to play every minute of the Terrapins' 26 games, tallying a career-high seven saves in a 1–1 draw with Old Dominion on September 24. He brought his hot form into the postseason, making five saves to help Maryland win the 2013 ACC Men's Soccer Tournament and earning himself an All-Atlantic Coast Conference Freshman Team selection. In the 2013 NCAA Division I Men's Soccer Tournament, Steffen made 18 saves in the Terrapins' five matches, helping Maryland make a run to the national championship game; they fell there to Notre Dame by a 2–1 scoreline. He was named as the tournament's Most Outstanding Defensive Player and earned a spot on the College Cup All-Tournament Team.

As Maryland transitioned to the Big Ten Conference in 2014, Steffen kept his place and again played every minute in goal for the Terrapins over their 22 matches. He conceded just 19 goals on the season, keeping nine shutouts as the Terrapins claimed the Big Ten regular season title in their first year in the conference. Steffen made nine saves in the 2014 Big Ten Conference Men's Soccer Tournament, as well as two denials during a penalty shootout in the semifinals, and was tabbed as the tournament's Most Valuable Defensive Player. His last collegiate game, however, saw the Terrapins eliminated in the first round of the 2014 NCAA Division I Men's Soccer Tournament by UMBC. Steffen left the school in December 2014 to sign professionally in Germany, departing Maryland after playing in 48 games for the Terrapins.

== Club career ==
=== Freiburg ===
Following his sophomore season at Maryland, Steffen departed the Terrapins and signed a professional contract with German club SC Freiburg. He arrived at the club midway through the 2014–15 season and was assigned to SC Freiburg II, the club's reserve team playing in the fourth-tier Regionalliga Südwest. Steffen was named to the bench twice for Freiburg II, but did not make his debut for the reserves until the following season.

On August 1, 2015, Steffen debuted for the Freiburg reserves with a start against 1. FC Saarbrücken; he kept a clean sheet in a 0–0 draw. He earned his first victory with the side on September 26, marking his fifth appearance with a 2–0 victory over SV Saar 05 Saarbrücken. Steffen went on to make 14 appearances for Freiburg II during the 2015–16 season, although the club finished in 15th place in the Regionalliga Südwest and was relegated to the Oberliga. Ahead of the 2016–17 SC Freiburg season, Steffen was training with the senior team; reports out of Germany stated that he would be Freiburg's third-choice goalkeeper for the upcoming season, behind presumed starter Alexander Schwolow and Patric Klandt.

=== Columbus Crew ===
==== Loan to Pittsburgh Riverhounds ====
Steffen returned to the United States on July 22, 2016, signing with Major League Soccer club Columbus Crew as a Discovery Signing. Although he had previously played for the Union Academy, he had not logged enough training time with Philadelphia to qualify as a Homegrown Player and had never been offered a contract by the Union. Steffen joined the Crew after third-string goalie Matt Pacifici had his season ended by concussions, but was still behind Steve Clark and Brad Stuver on the depth chart. After appearing once on the bench for the Crew, Steffen was sent on loan to United Soccer League club Pittsburgh Riverhounds on August 13. The loan was on a match-by-match basis for the remainder of the 2016 season. He made his Riverhounds debut that same day, making six saves in a 2–1 victory over Bethlehem Steel, and would go on to make nine appearances on the year for Pittsburgh. Steffen additionally was named to the bench three times for the Crew without making an appearance.

==== Starter in Columbus ====
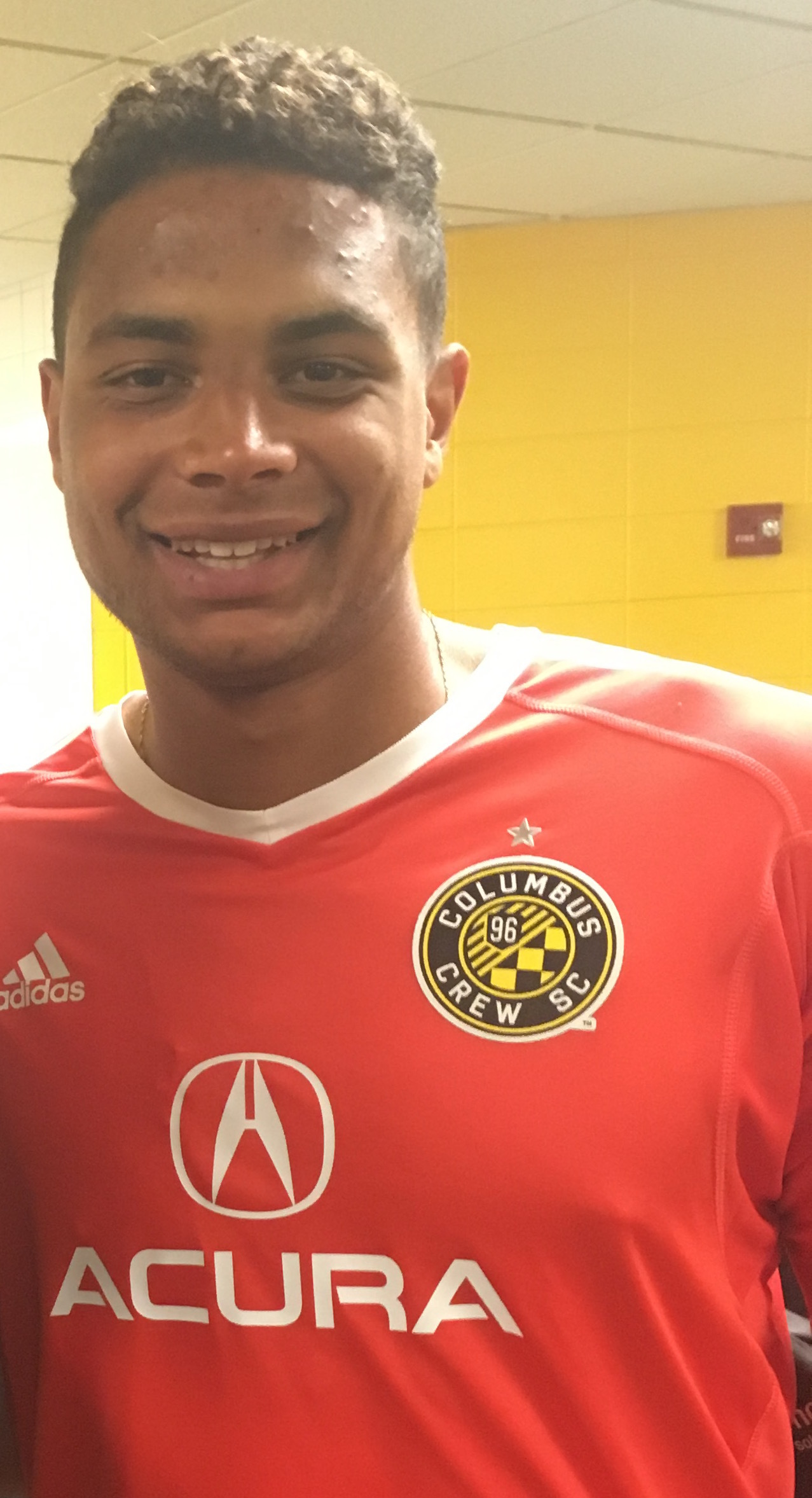
Steffen with Columbus Crew SC in 2017

Ahead of the 2017 season, Steffen was named as the Crew's starting goalkeeper after beating out Stuver and Logan Ketterer to win the job. He made his club debut in the season opener, making two saves in a 1–1 draw against Chicago Fire. He wouldn't relinquish the job, starting all 34 regular season games for the Crew and leading the club to an MLS Cup Playoffs berth after missing out in 2016. Along the way, he twice tallied a career-high seven saves: against Orlando City on August 19 and New York City FC on October 22. In the knockout round of the 2017 MLS Cup Playoffs, Steffen "had the game of his life" against Atlanta United. He made eight saves through 120 minutes of regulation and extra time, then saved two shots during the shoot-out as the Crew advanced 3–1 on penalties. Steffen made 39 total appearances on the season as the Crew were eliminated in the conference finals by Toronto FC.

Steffen missed time during the 2018 season due to international commitments, as well as a mid-season knee injury, but still went on to make 32 total appearances on the year. In one nine-match stretch, ranging from a victory over San Jose Earthquakes on April 28 to a defeat against Atlanta on June 13, Steffen recorded a 525-minute shutout streak, the longest in Crew history. He appeared in seven of those nine matches, missing two while on international duty. He was named to the roster for the 2018 MLS All-Star Game against Italian club Juventus, the first Crew player selected to take part in the All-Star Game since Wil Trapp in 2016. Steffen replaced starting goalie Brad Guzan at halftime and made two saves, but failed to make a stop in the penalty shoot-out as Juventus scored on all five kicks. In the 2018 MLS Cup Playoffs, Steffen repeated his heroics from the previous year: against D.C. United in the knockout round, he saved two kicks in the penalty shoot-out as the Crew advanced. After tallying a career-high 10 clean sheets on the season, Steffen was named as the 2018 MLS Goalkeeper of the Year and earned a spot on the MLS Best XI.

During the summer of 2018, Steffen had been the subject of a $3.9 million offer from English club Bristol City; the Crew turned down the offer, however, saying that replacing Steffen midseason "would have been difficult, if not impossible." Following the season, however, a bid starting at £7 million arrived from fellow English club and defending Premier League champions Manchester City and was accepted by the Crew. As per the agreement, Steffen would remain in Columbus through the opening of the summer transfer window in Major League Soccer. He appeared 13 times in his final half-season with the Crew, playing his final game for the club on June 1, 2019, against New York City. Steffen departed Columbus with 26 clean sheets from 84 total appearances.

=== Manchester City ===
Steffen signed for English club Manchester City on July 9, 2019. The transfer, for a fee that was estimated at $7 million, was agreed by the two clubs on December 11, 2018. Steffen remained with Columbus until the opening of the summer transfer window in Major League Soccer before moving abroad. Although the exact fee was not reported, the Crew said it was "the largest in club history and most ever received by an MLS club for a goalkeeper".

==== 2019–20 season: Loan to Fortuna Düsseldorf ====
It was announced on July 9, 2019, that Steffen would be sent on loan to Fortuna Düsseldorf in the Bundesliga for the 2019–20 season. Düsseldorf sporting director, Lutz Pfannenstiel, noted that Steffen was the "perfect example of a modern goalkeeper" while discussing that he had been scouting the player since he worked at TSG 1899 Hoffenheim.

Throughout the first half of the season Steffen's abilities were noted and his performances for Düsseldorf were described as "outstanding". Steffen started the club's first 17 matches, but suffered an injury to his patellar tendon that kept him out of action throughout the Bundesliga winter break and the COVID-19 pandemic stoppage. While getting back to fitness and preparing to come back from his injury, Steffen suffered another knee injury that prematurely ended his season. Steffen had the second highest number of saves behind the third worst defense in the league before his injuries, and it was thought that Düsseldorf may have avoided relegation if not for his injury.

Steffen and Düsseldorf were in discussions to extend his loan with the club for another season, however, Düsseldorf's relegation ended this possibility.

==== 2020–21 season: Return to City ====
After City's second choice goalkeeper Claudio Bravo's contract expired, Steffen returned from his loan spell and was named in City's first team for the upcoming 2020–21 season. Steffen was included in the City squad for the first time in the opening game of the season against Wolves and made his debut only three days later, starting against Bournemouth in the League Cup third round, winning 2–1 at the Etihad Stadium. Steffen made his UEFA Champions League debut on December 9, 2020, against Olympique de Marseille in the last game of the group stage, keeping a clean sheet in a 3–0 win.

Steffen made his Premier League debut in a 3–1 away win over Chelsea, replacing Ederson who had tested positive for COVID-19. He then went on to make his debut in the third round of the FA Cup a week later, keeping a clean-sheet in a 3–0 home win over Championship side Birmingham City.

Steffen kept a clean sheet for City in their EFL Cup final win over Tottenham Hotspur on April 25, 2021. He became just the fifth American, and fourth goalkeeper, to win the League/EFL Cup.

==== 2021–22 season ====
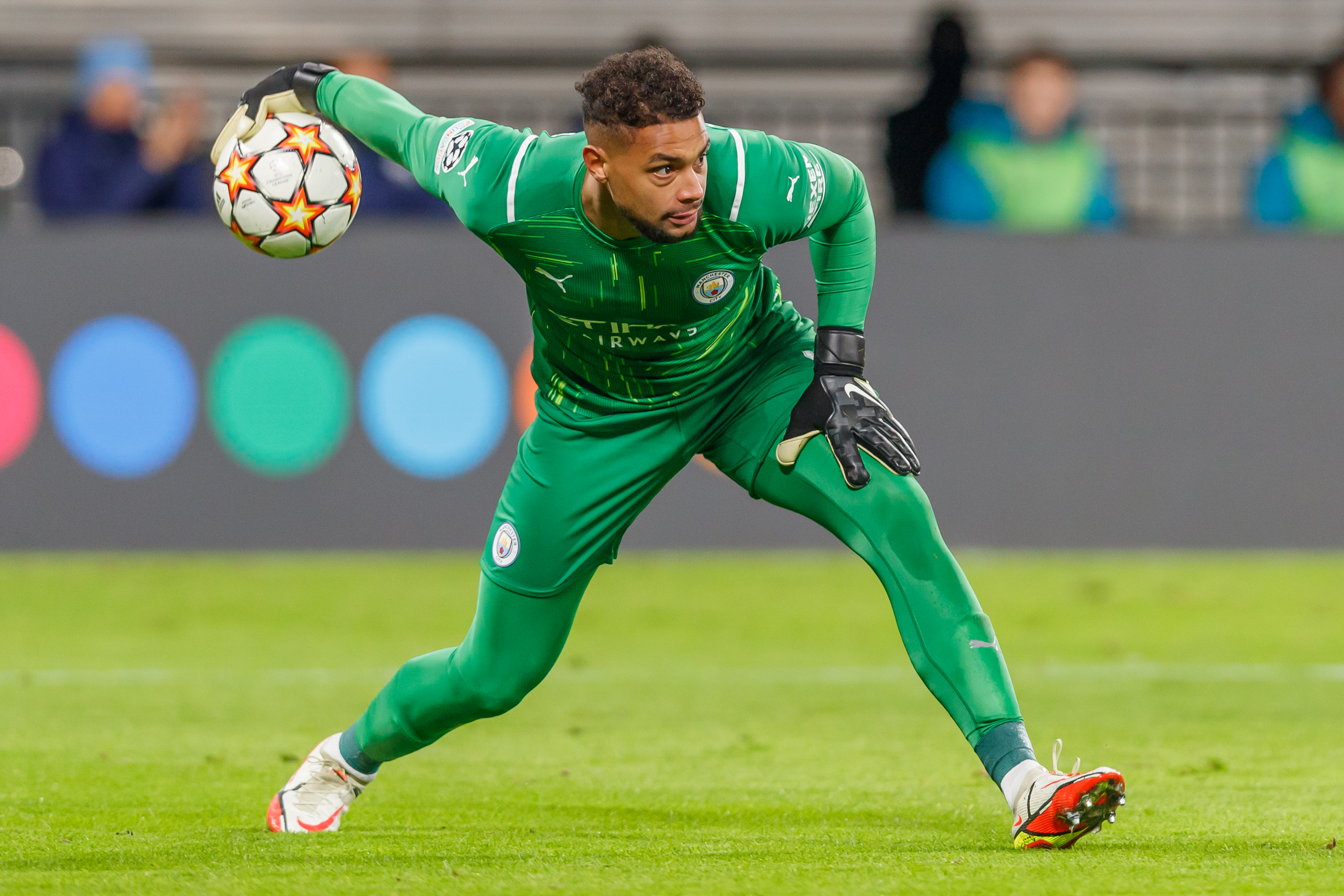
Steffen with Manchester City in 2021

On November 4, 2021, Steffen signed a new long-term contract with City, keeping him at the club until 2025. On October 16, 2021, Steffen played his first league match of the season when City won against Burnley with 2–0 at home. On December 7, he made his second appearance in the Champions League during his career when City lost 2–1 to RB Leipzig at Red Bull Arena. On April 16, 2022, Steffen started in the FA Cup semi final at Wembley against Liverpool. He made a high-profile error, being tackled by Sadio Mané to give Liverpool a 2–0 lead. Liverpool would go on to win 3–2.

==== 2022–23 season: Loan to Middlesbrough ====
On July 19, 2022, he joined EFL Championship club Middlesbrough on a season-long loan.

=== Colorado Rapids ===
On January 4, 2024, Steffen returned to the United States, joining MLS side Colorado Rapids on a three-year contract with an option for a further year.

== International career ==
=== 2012–2015: Youth level ===
Steffen was the starting goalkeeper for the United States under-20 side at the 2015 CONCACAF U-20 Championship and the 2015 FIFA U-20 World Cup. On June 10, 2015, his save on a penalty kick attempted by Jarlan Barrera helped the U.S. to an upset of Colombia in the Round of 16 of the World Cup.

On May 16, 2016, Steffen received his first callup to the United States national team for a camp based in Puerto Rico. Steffen did not make an appearance, but in January 2018, he was called again into camp for a friendly against Bosnia and Herzegovina, against which he made his debut. He made his second appearance in a friendly against Paraguay, recording his first clean sheet in a 1–0 victory, on March 27, 2018, at WakeMed Soccer Park in Cary, North Carolina. On June 9, 2018, at the Parc Olympique Lyonnais in Lyon, Steffen notched seven saves against eventual 2018 FIFA World Cup champions France, including back-to-back saves in the dying seconds of stoppage time against Nabil Fekir and Ousmane Dembélé, as the United States drew France 1–1.

== Personal life ==
Steffen is of African American and German descent. His sister, Katy, played college softball at Penn State University's Brandywine campus. His other sister, Lexy, briefly played collegiate soccer at West Chester University, appearing in one game in 2015 as a goalkeeper. Steffen has the phrase "forever my family", as well as four German words, tattooed on his rib cage in honor of his four younger siblings. He majored in marketing while at Maryland. He is the oldest of five children, with the others being brothers Ben and Cole.

Steffen is a co-founder of VOYCENOW Foundation, a non-profit organization that brings athletes and fans together to help Black communities in America and fight for equality.

== Career statistics ==
=== Club ===
As of match played May 2, 2026

Appearances and goals by club, season and competition
Club	Season	League			National cup (Note: Includes DFB-Pokal, FA Cup)		League cup (Note: Includes MLS Cup playoffs, EFL Cup)		Continental		Other		Total	
Club	Season	Division	Apps	Goals	Apps	Goals	Apps	Goals	Apps	Goals	Apps	Goals	Apps	Goals
SC Freiburg II	2014–15	Regionalliga Südwest	0	0	—		—		—		—		0	0
SC Freiburg II	2015–16	Regionalliga Südwest	14	0	—		—		—		—		14	0
SC Freiburg II	Total		14	0	—		—		—		—		14	0
Pittsburgh Riverhounds (loan)	2016	United Soccer League	9	0	—		—		—		—		9	0
Columbus Crew	2016	Major League Soccer	0	0	0	0	—		—		—		0	0
Columbus Crew	2017	Major League Soccer	34	0	0	0	5	0	—		—		39	0
Columbus Crew	2018	Major League Soccer	29	0	0	0	3	0	—		—		32	0
Columbus Crew	2019	Major League Soccer	13	0	0	0	—		—		—		13	0
Columbus Crew	Total		76	0	0	0	8	0	—		—		84	0
Fortuna Düsseldorf (loan)	2019–20	Bundesliga	17	0	1	0	—		—		—		18	0
Manchester City	2020–21	Premier League	1	0	5	0	5	0	1 (Note: Appearance in UEFA Champions League)	0	—		12	0
Manchester City	2021–22	Premier League	1	0	4	0	2	0	1	0	1 (Note: Appearance in FA Community Shield)	0	9	0
Manchester City	2023–24	Premier League	0	0	0	0	0	0	0	0	0	0	0	0
Manchester City	Total		2	0	9	0	7	0	2	0	1	0	21	0
Middlesbrough (loan)	2022–23	Championship	42	0	1	0	—		—		2 (Note: Appearances in Championship play-offs)	0	45	0
Colorado Rapids	2024	Major League Soccer	33	0	—		2	0	—		7 (Note: Appearances in Leagues Cup)	0	42	0
Colorado Rapids	2025	Major League Soccer	23	0	—		—		2 (Note: Appearances in CONCACAF Champions Cup)	0	2	0	27	0
Colorado Rapids	2026	Major League Soccer	9	0	0	0	—		—		—		9	0
Colorado Rapids	Total		65	0	0	0	2	0	2	0	9	0	78	0
Career total			225	0	11	0	17	0	4	0	12	0	269	0

=== International ===
As of match played January 22, 2025

Appearances and goals by national team and year
National team	Year	Apps	Goals
United States	2018	6	0
United States	2019	11	0
United States	2020	2	0
United States	2021	7	0
United States	2022	3	0
United States	2023	0	0
United States	2024	0	0
United States	2025	1	0
Total		30	0

== Honors ==
Manchester City

- Premier League: 2020–21, 2021–22
- EFL Cup: 2020–21
- UEFA Champions League runner-up: 2020–21

United States

- CONCACAF Nations League: 2019–20

Individual

- Columbus Crew Defender of the Year: 2017
- MLS Player of the Month: May 2018
- MLS Goalkeeper of the Year Award: 2018
- MLS Best XI: 2018
- MLS All-Star: 2018
- Leagues Cup Best Goalkeeper: 2024
