= Rodrigo Saravia =

Guatemalan professional footballer (born 1993)

Personal information
- Full name: Rodrigo Saravia Samayoa
- Date of birth: 22 February 1993 (age 33)
- Place of birth: Guatemala City, Guatemala
- Height: 1.80 m (5 ft 11 in)
- Position: Midfielder

Team information
- Current team: Municipal
- Number: 8

Youth career
- ????–2010: Futeca
- 2010–2012: Antigua

College career
Years	Team	Apps	(Gls)
2012–2015	Florida Gulf Coast Eagles	67	(2)

Senior career*
Years	Team	Apps	(Gls)
2016–2017	Columbus Crew	10	(0)
2016	→ Pittsburgh Riverhounds (loan)	2	(0)
2017	→ IK Frej (loan)	10	(1)
2018	Swope Park Rangers	11	(2)
2018–2022	Comunicaciones	80	(3)
2022	Plaza Colonia	9	(0)
2023	Monagas	0	(0)
2023–2024	Comunicaciones	27	(0)
2024–2025	Pérez Zeledón	17	(0)
2025–	Municipal	47	(2)

International career^{‡}
2016–	Guatemala	63	(0)
- * Club domestic league appearances and goals as of 22:27, 12 June 2026 (UTC) ‡ National team caps and goals as of 08:10, 9 September (UTC+2)

Rodrigo Saravia Samayoa (born 22 February 1993) is a Guatemalan professional footballer who plays as a midfielder for Liga Guate club Municipal and the Guatemala national team.

== Youth and college ==
Savaria was born in Guatemala City. As a youth in Guatemala, he played for Futeca and Antigua GFC. He played for Antigua's youth teams for two seasons and was a standout in the midfield before being recruited to play college soccer in the United States. He was recruited by Boston College, Virginia Commonwealth, North Carolina State, and Rutgers, before choosing to play at Florida Gulf Coast.

Saravia immediately stepped into a starting role at FGCU, starting all 19 games his freshman season and being named to the Atlantic Sun All-Freshman Team. He scored his first collegiate goal against USC Upstate on 12 October 2012 in a 1–0 victory for the Eagles. He started against South Florida in the first round of the NCAA Tournament as the Eagles were knocked out on penalties. Saravia did not manage to score during his sophomore season, but was named to the Atlantic Sun All-Conference Second Team while recording two assists and starting all 16 games. He bounced back his junior year, scoring a goal in 19 appearances as the Eagles returned to the NCAA Tournament for the second time in Saravia's college career, where they fell 1–0 to Coastal Carolina. Saravia was named to the Atlantic Sun All-Conference First Team for the first time in his career and also made the A-Sun Academic All-Conference Team. In 2015, his senior season, Saravia notched a career-high three assists in just 13 games, while being named the Atlantic Sun Player of the Year. He made the All-Conference First Team for a second year in a row and was named to the NSCAA All-Region Third Team. FGCU won the Atlantic Sun regular season championship all four years that Saravia played, winning the conference tournament and advancing to the NCAA Tournament in 2012 and 2014. Over four seasons, Saravia made 67 appearances for the Eagles, providing two goals and seven assists.

== Club career ==
=== Columbus Crew SC ===
Savaria was one of 59 players invited to the 2016 MLS Combine in Fort Lauderdale, Florida. In the process, he became the first-ever Florida Gulf Coast player invited to the combine and only the third-ever Atlantic Sun player invited to the event since 2007. Columbus Crew SC, the MLS Cup 2015 runners-up, selected him with the 19th overall pick in the 2016 MLS SuperDraft following his performance at the MLS Combine. About the player, head coach Gregg Berhalter said, "He is very poised and controlled, a very smart, simple player, and very good technically.” On 4 February 2016, it was announced that he had signed a professional contract with the club.

Saravia made his professional debut on 16 April 2016 in a 3–2 victory over New York City FC, coming on as a substitute for Mohammed Saeid in the 90+5'. He appeared in the next three games for Crew SC, coming off the bench as a midfielder. On 21 May, Saravia made his first professional appearance as a center back, replacing Gastón Sauro in the 35th minute of a scoreless draw with Toronto FC. In Crew SC's next match, against Real Salt Lake on 28 May, Saravia earned his first start for Columbus. He played the full 90 minutes at center back as Crew SC picked up a 4–3 victory. It would mark his only start of the season. After his return from loan, Saravia made two more appearances for Crew SC, coming off the bench against New England Revolution on 20 August and against Orlando City on 17 September. He finished his first season with Columbus having made 10 appearances on the season, nine coming off the bench. "I lacked speed in my game" Saravia recalled.

On 2 March 2017, Crew SC announced that they were sending Saravia on loan to IK Frej. Saravia spent the entire 2017 season on loan in Sweden, and did not return to Columbus until after the roster freeze, making him unable to appear in the postseason. In December 2017, Columbus announced that they had declined Saravia's contract option, ending his two-year stay in Columbus, finishing with 12 appearances across all competitions.

==== Loan to Pittsburgh Riverhounds ====
On 10 August 2016, it was announced that Saravia and two teammates were loaned to Crew SC's USL affiliates, Pittsburgh Riverhounds, on a match-by-match basis. He made his Riverhounds debut the same day against FC Montreal in a 4–1 defeat. Saravia made his only other appearance for Pittsburgh three days later, on 13 August against Bethlehem Steel FC. He came on as a substitute, playing for 27 minutes in the 2–1 victory for the Riverhounds.

==== Loan to IK Frej ====
On 2 March 2017, IK Frej of the Superettan announced they had acquired Saravia on a season-long loan from Columbus. He appeared for Frej in a preseason friendly against AFC Eskilstuna, but underwent surgery for a broken fifth metatarsal before the regular season began, putting him out for eight to ten weeks. Saravia made his debut for the club on 17 June in a 4–2 defeat to Syrianska FC, coming on in the 67th minute to see his first action since preseason. Saravia scored his first professional goal on 18 August after coming on as a substitute, scoring the final goal in a 3–1 victory for Frej in the 90+2’. Saravia concluded his loan spell in Sweden having scored one goal in 12 appearances across all competitions.

=== Swope Park Rangers ===
In January 2018, He signed for Swope Park Rangers and was named captain to start the year. During his brief spell at the club he scored two goals in back-to-back games early in the season, and in June 2018 he was transferred to Guatemalan club Comunicaciones F.C.

=== Comunicaciones ===
Saravia was acquired by Comunicaciones and immediately became a starter for the club. On 18 October 2018, Saravia underwent a surgery for a broken fifth metatarsal, the second of his career, this time on his left foot. He scored his first goal for Las Cremas on 27 January 2019, and scored in the following match as well.

== International career ==
Saravia has represented Guatemala at the U17, U20, and U23 levels. He was called up the U23 squad during 2015 CONCACAF Olympic Qualifying, as Guatemala were defeated by Costa Rica in the repechage playoff of the Central American Zone.

Saravia was called up to the Guatemala national team for the first time in summer 2015 as the only collegiate, non-professional player in the squad for a friendly match against the United States at LP Field in Nashville, Tennessee, and made the matchday roster, although he did not appear. He was again called up to the senior squad for a friendly against Honduras on 10 February 2016. Saravia started, making his senior international debut, and played the full 90 minutes of the 3–1 victory. He was the only foreign-based player in the squad as Guatemala head coach Walter Claverí prepared his team for upcoming 2018 World Cup qualifiers against the United States, Trinidad and Tobago and Saint Vincent and the Grenadines in the spring and summer of 2016. Saravia appeared in both games against the United States. The second of the home-and-home set was played at MAPFRE Stadium, making Saravia just the fourth Crew SC player to appear in an international match at the stadium. He also appeared against Trinidad and Tobago and Saint Vincent and the Grenadines, bringing his career total to four World Cup qualifying appearances in six total caps.

Saravia's international career was halted in 2016, when FIFA suspended the National Football Federation of Guatemala. The national team was barred from playing matches while the suspension was in effect.

== Honours ==
Comunicaciones

- CONCACAF League: 2021
- Liga Nacional: Clausura 2022, Apertura 2023

== Career statistics ==
=== Club ===
As of 30 October 2022

Club	Season	League			Playoffs (Note: Appearance in Superettan relegation playoffs)		Cup (Note: Includes the U.S. Open Cup and Svenska Cupen)		Continental		Total	
Club	Season	Division	Apps	Goals	Apps	Goals	Apps	Goals	Apps	Goals	Apps	Goals
Columbus Crew SC	2016	Major League Soccer	10	0	–		2	0	–		12	0
Columbus Crew SC	2017	Major League Soccer	0	0	0	0	0	0	–		0	0
Columbus Crew SC	Total		10	0	0	0	2	0	0	0	12	0
Pittsburgh Riverhounds (loan)	2016	United Soccer League	2	0	–		0	0	–		2	0
IK Frej (loan)	2017	Superettan	10	1	1	0	1	0	–		12	1
Swope Park Rangers	2018	United Soccer League	11	2	0	0	–		–		11	2
Comunicaciones	2018–19	Liga Nacional de Guatemala	28	2	–		–		–		28	2
Comunicaciones	2019–20	Liga Nacional de Guatemala	28	0	–		–		6	0	34	0
Comunicaciones	2020–21	Liga Nacional de Guatemala	34	1	–		–		10 (Note: Includes the CONCACAF Champions League and CONCACAF League)	0	44	1
Comunicaciones	2021–22	Liga Nacional de Guatemala	38	0	–		–		4	0	42	0
Comunicaciones	Total		128	3	–		–		20	0	148	3
Plaza Colonia	2022	Uruguayan Primera División	9	0	–		–		0	0	9	0
Career total			170	6	1	0	3	0	20	0	194	6

=== International ===
As of 30 October 2022

Guatemala
Year	Apps	Goals
2016	6	0
2017	0	0
2018	2	0
2019	8	0
2020	3	0
2021	8	0
2022	9	0
Total	36	0
