= 2017 Carolina Challenge Cup =

Tournament details
- Host country: United States
- Dates: February 18–25
- Teams: 4 (from 1 confederation)
- Venue(s): 1 (in 1 host city)

Final positions
- Champions: Columbus Crew (2nd title)
- Runners-up: Atlanta United FC
- Third place: Charleston Battery
- Fourth place: Seattle Sounders FC

Tournament statistics
- Matches played: 6
- Goals scored: 17 (2.83 per match)

The 2017 Carolina Challenge Cup was the 13th edition of the Carolina Challenge Cup, an annual soccer tournament held in South Carolina by the Charleston Battery. The tournament ran from February 18 to 25, with all matches played at MUSC Health Stadium in Charleston, South Carolina.

In addition to the Charleston Battery of the United Soccer League (USL), three Major League Soccer (MLS) clubs participated: expansion franchise Atlanta United FC, Columbus Crew SC and defending MLS Cup champions Seattle Sounders FC. Columbus won the competition with two wins and one draw.

== Teams ==
Team	League	Appearance
(United States) Atlanta United FC	MLS	1st
(United States) Charleston Battery (hosts)	USL	13th
(United States) Columbus Crew	MLS	4th
(United States) Seattle Sounders FC	MLS	2nd

== Standings ==
Team	Pld	W	D	L	GF	GA	GD	Pts
Columbus Crew	3	2	1	0	4	2	2	7
Atlanta United FC	3	2	0	1	6	5	1	6
Charleston Battery	3	0	2	1	4	3	1	2
Seattle Sounders FC	3	0	1	2	3	6	-3	1

== Matches ==
February 18 Friendly	Atlanta United	1–2	Columbus Crew	Charleston, South Carolina
16:30 EST (UTC−05:00)	Martínez 6'	Report	Higuaín 57', 62'; Trapp (yellow card) 69'; Abubakar (yellow card) 72'; Crognale (yellow card) 90'	Stadium: MUSC Health Stadium

February 18 Friendly	Charleston Battery	1–1	Seattle Sounders	Charleston, South Carolina
19:00 EST (UTC−05:00)	Vázquez (yellow card) 78'; Higashi 90'+2'	Report	Mueller 32' (o.g.); Delem (yellow card) 37'; Jones (yellow card) 40'	Stadium: MUSC Health Stadium

February 22 Friendly	Charleston Battery	1–1	Columbus Crew	Charleston, South Carolina
17:00 EST (UTC−05:00)	Marini (yellow card) 12'; Chang (yellow card) 22'; Williams (yellow card) 24'; Lasso 25'; Mueller (yellow card) 61'		Jonathan (yellow card) 8'; Afful (yellow card) 23'; Næss 63' (o.g.); Abu (yellow card) 79'; Abubakar (yellow card) 83'	Stadium: MUSC Health Stadium

February 22 Friendly	Atlanta United	4–2	Seattle Sounders	Charleston, South Carolina
19:30 EST (UTC−05:00)	Martínez 1', 46'; Almirón 3' (pen.); Villalba 21' (red card) 66', 69'; González Pírez (yellow card) 36'; Heath (yellow card) 78'; Kratz (yellow card) 78'	Report	Delem (yellow card) 29'; Wingo 62'; Bruin 74'; Lodeiro (yellow card) 84'	Stadium: MUSC Health Stadium

February 25 Friendly	Seattle Sounders	0–1	Columbus Crew	Charleston, South Carolina
16:30 EST (UTC−05:00)	Alonso (yellow card) 46'; Roldan (yellow card) 89'		Trapp (yellow card) 15'; Hansen 82'	Stadium: MUSC Health Stadium

February 25 Friendly	Charleston Battery	1–2	Atlanta United	Charleston, South Carolina
19:00 EST (UTC−05:00)	Williams 45'	Report	Asad 4'; Villalba 90'	Stadium: MUSC Health Stadium

== See also ==
- Carolina Challenge Cup
- Charleston Battery
- 2017 in American soccer
