= Wil Trapp =

American soccer player (born 1993)

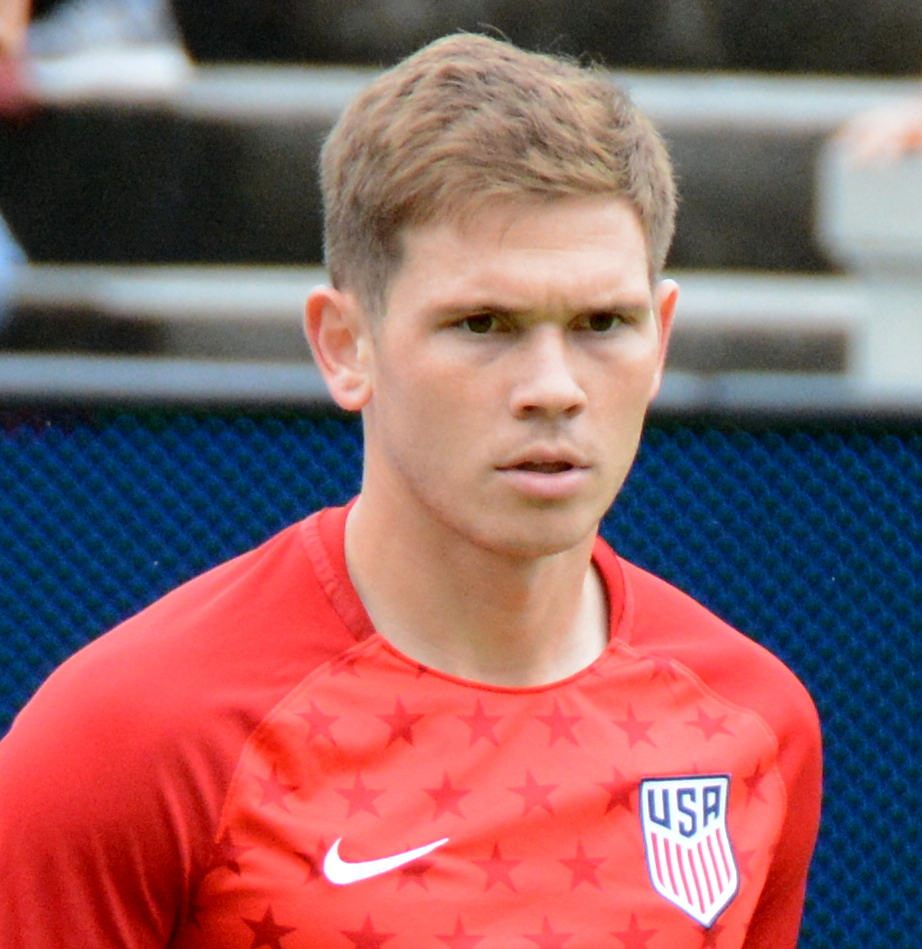
- Trapp with the United States in 2019

Personal information
- Full name: William Alexander Trapp
- Date of birth: January 15, 1993 (age 33)
- Place of birth: Columbus, Ohio, United States
- Height: 5 ft 8 in (1.73 m)
- Position: Defensive midfielder

Team information
- Current team: Minnesota United
- Number: 20

Youth career
- 2008–2011: Columbus Crew

College career
Years	Team	Apps	(Gls)
2011–2012	Akron Zips	45	(1)

Senior career*
Years	Team	Apps	(Gls)
2013–2019	Columbus Crew	185	(2)
2020	Inter Miami	21	(0)
2021–	Minnesota United	169	(4)

International career^{‡}
2011	United States U18	2	(0)
2012–2013	United States U20	21	(1)
2015–2016	United States U23	7	(0)
2015–2019	United States	20	(0)
Medal record
Representing United States
Runner-up	CONCACAF Under-20 Championship	2013
Runner-up	CONCACAF Gold Cup	2019
Third place	CONCACAF Men's Olympic Qualifying Tournament	2015
- * Club domestic league appearances and goals as of January 11, 2026 ‡ National team caps and goals as of September 6, 2019

William Alexander Trapp (born January 15, 1993) is an American professional soccer player who plays as a defensive midfielder for Major League Soccer club Minnesota United.

A native of Columbus, Ohio, Trapp graduated from Lincoln High School, where he was the 2010 NSCAA National High School Player of the Year, and played two years in college at Akron. He signed with Columbus Crew SC as a Homegrown Player, the fourth in club history, and would eventually be named as the club's captain. Trapp wore the armband for Crew SC for the first time on May 17, 2014, and received the nod permanently ahead of the 2017 season. While with Columbus, he was named as a 2016 MLS All-Star, and appeared in MLS Cup 2015.

At international level, Trapp first installed himself as a fixture for the United States with the youth teams. He captained the U20s at the 2013 FIFA U-20 World Cup, and did the same for the U23s in the 2016 CONCACAF–CONMEBOL play-off. Trapp earned his first cap for the senior national team on January 28, 2015.

== Youth and college ==
Born in Columbus, Ohio, Trapp is a graduate of Lincoln High School in neighboring Gahanna and a youth product of Columbus Crew. He played just two seasons of high school soccer with the Golden Lions, but was named a high school All-American both years. Additionally, he led Lincoln to their first-ever state title in 2009 while being named the Ohio Gatorade Player of the Year, and was the NSCAA National High School Player of the Year in 2010. In 2014, Trapp had his number 20 jersey retired by Lincoln. At club level, he played four seasons in the U.S. Soccer Development Academy with Columbus, captaining his teams at U16 and U18 level. Trapp was the Crew Academy player of the year in 2009 and 2010. He was rated as a five-star recruit by Top Drawer Soccer and as the fifth-ranked recruit in the nation by multiple outlets, eventually committing to play for head coach Caleb Porter and the Akron Zips.

Trapp would play just two seasons at Akron, making 45 appearances for the Zips and scoring once. As a freshman, he started all 23 games, putting up performances that were impressive enough to earn him nods as the top freshman player in the country, MAC Newcomer of the Year, and to the All-MAC First Team. On August 27, 2011, Trapp notched the game-winning assist on his collegiate debut against Cleveland State; he would finish the season with five assists. As a sophomore, Trapp was named to the All-MAC First Team for the second consecutive season, and was named an NSCAA Third Team All-American. He tallied three assists in 22 games, and also scored his only collegiate goal: the winning goal against Bowling Green in the MAC Tournament semifinals. Akron won three MAC titles during Trapp's two years with the program, two regular season and one tournament, and qualified for the NCAA Tournament in both seasons.

== Club career ==
=== Columbus Crew ===
"Wil Trapp was outstanding today. I know Higuaín usually gets all the [credit], and their striker Schoenfeld will get credit because he scored two goals. But Wil Trapp was the key…Wil Trapp does his job. He brings the ball out for them and it's difficult to stop...He has, hopefully for him, a good future. He's American, you guys should be happy, but today I thought he was the difference."

— New York Red Bulls striker Thierry Henry after a Columbus victory in October 2014.

On December 13, 2012, it was announced that Trapp had signed with his hometown Major League Soccer club, Columbus Crew, as a Homegrown Player. He became the fourth HGP signing in club history, following in the path of Aaron Horton, Matt Lampson, and Ben Speas. After missing the early part of his first season while on international duty, Trapp made his professional debut for the Crew on July 7, 2013, starting and playing the full ninety minutes in a 1–0 victory against Portland Timbers; he was named as the club's man of the match after completing 86 percent of his passes. Trapp started the final sixteen matches of the season for Columbus, earning a postseason nod as the club's Breakout Performer of the Year.

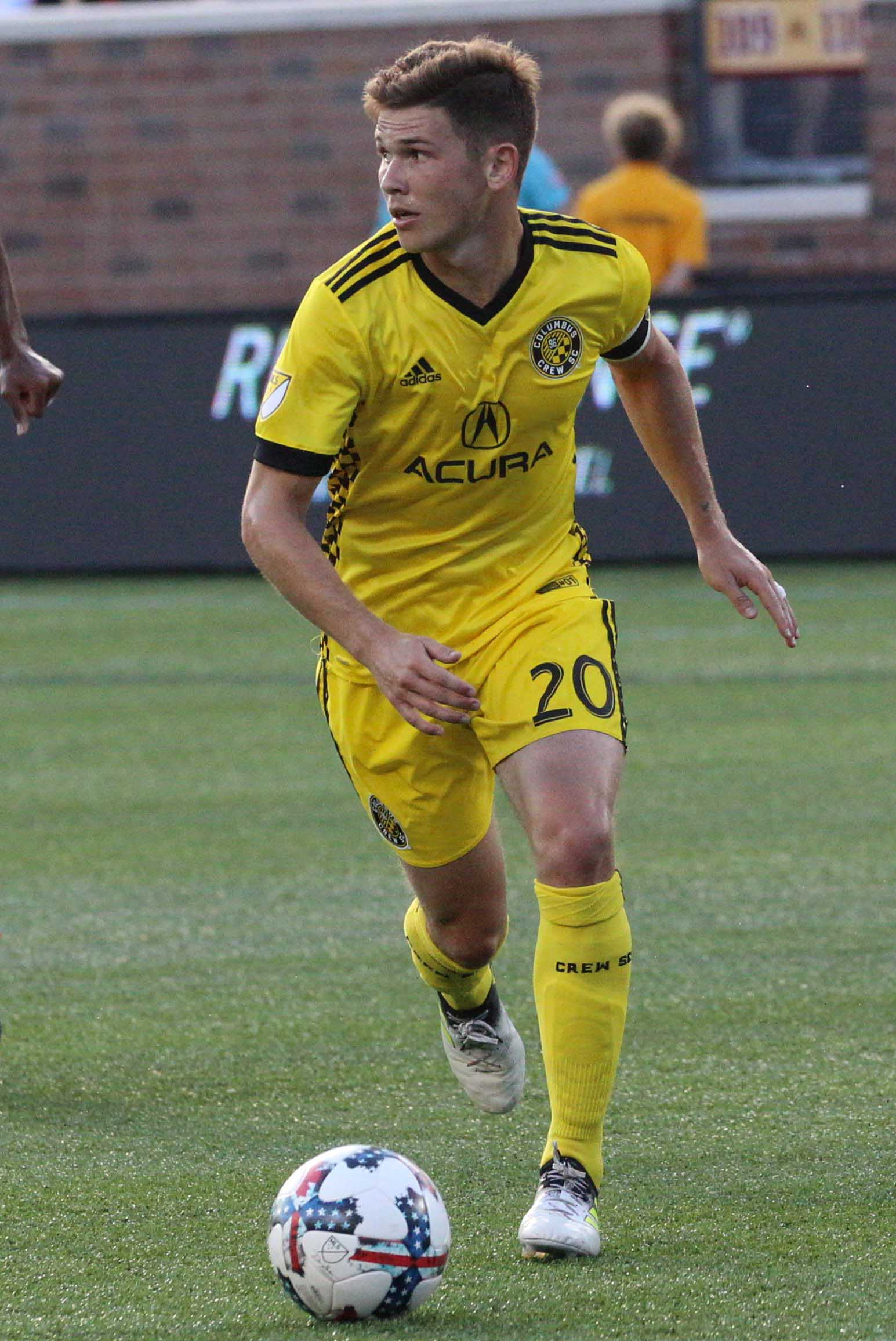
Trapp was the youngest player in MLS history to serve as team captain in a league match, doing so at 21 years, 122 days.

Ahead of his second professional season, Trapp was named as the vice captain for Columbus, serving as understudy to Michael Parkhurst. Trapp wore the captain's armband for the first time on May 17, 2014, captaining the Crew in Parkhurst's absence against Portland. He became the first Homegrown Player in MLS history to wear the captain's armband in a league fixture, and at 21 years old was the youngest captain in league history. Trapp set a number of other firsts throughout the season: he received his first red card on May 4, part of a 2–0 defeat against Sporting Kansas City, and scored his first professional goal on September 13, part of a 2–2 draw against Houston Dynamo. He made his postseason debut in the conference semifinals, starting both legs against New England Revolution. Additionally, Trapp was selected to take part in the 2014 Major League Soccer Homegrown Game, alongside his teammate Lampson. Trapp finished the season with one goal in 31 total appearances.

Trapp's 2015 season was defined by absences at club level, both for injury and international duty. His first serious injury with Columbus was suffered in April, a concussion that saw him miss thirteen total matches stretching through the end of June. Trapp then missed multiple matches in the fall, stemming from two call-ups to the United States U23 national team. He was at his best in the postseason, starting all five matches as Crew SC made a run to MLS Cup 2015. There, Trapp tallied a shot and committed three fouls as Crew SC were defeated 2–1 by Portland. He made 25 appearances during the season.

Trapp was named as a 2016 MLS All-Star, the first Homegrown Player in Crew SC history to be named as an all-star. He made the 22-man game day roster, coming on as a halftime substitute for Giovani dos Santos in the 2–1 defeat to Arsenal. Outside of that honor, however, 2016 was mostly a season of disappointment for both Trapp and Crew SC. He missed the entire month of September after suffering a concussion in late August, sitting out four matches before returning to the field. Trapp tallied just one assist in 32 appearances in all competitions, tied for the lowest number of his career, and Columbus missed the playoffs for the first time since his first season as a pro. Ahead of the 2017 season, Trapp signed a contract extension running through 2020, tying him to the club through his age-27 season.

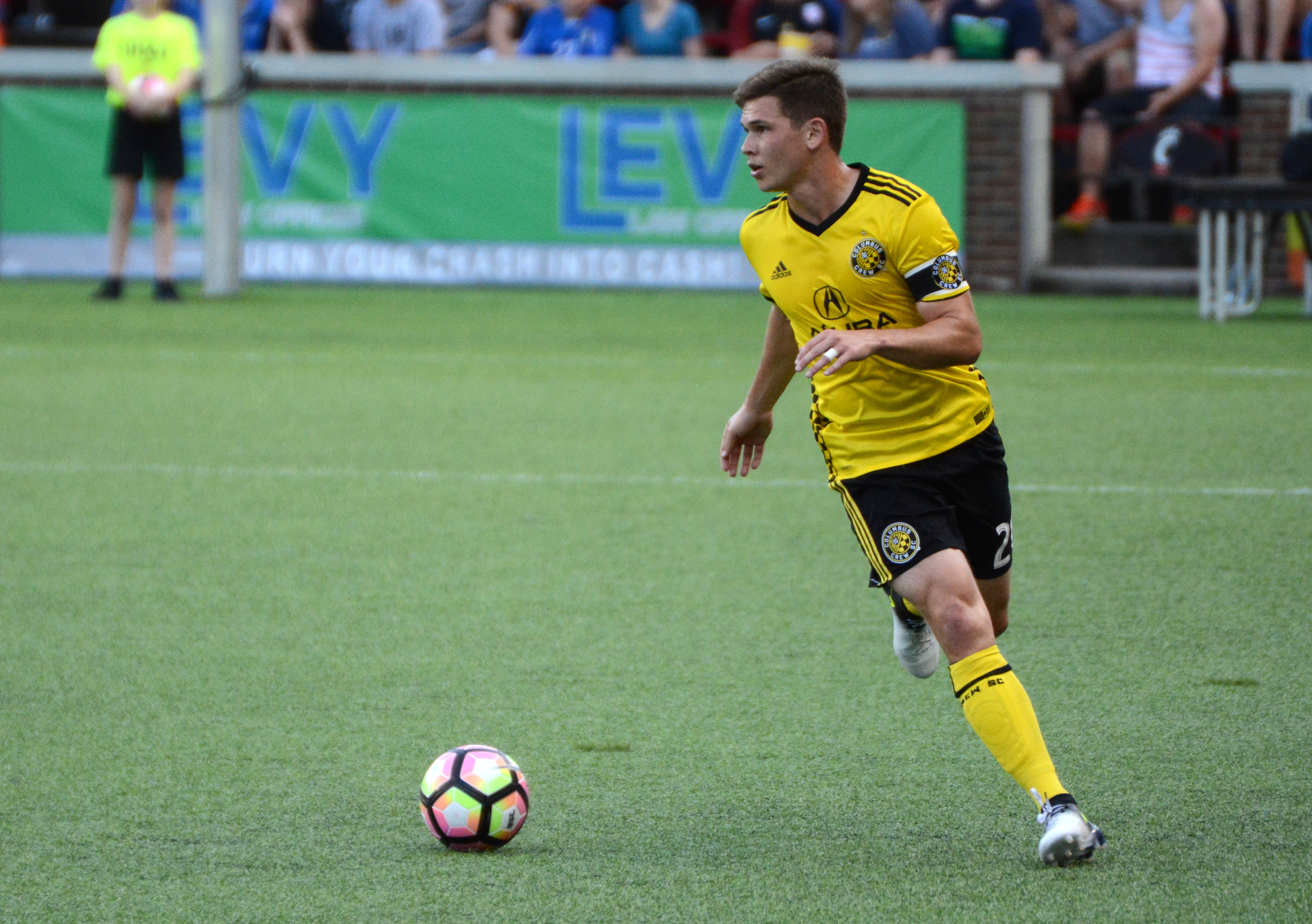
Trapp in action during the inaugural Hell Is Real derby, played in the 2017 U.S. Open Cup.

Columbus traded Parkhurst to Atlanta United ahead of the 2017 season; to take his place, Trapp was elevated to the role of captain. He served ahead of a five-man leadership council, made up of Federico Higuaín, Ethan Finlay, Justin Meram, Jonathan Mensah, and Josh Williams, that collectively served as vice-captains. In his first season as captain, Trapp started all 40 games that Columbus played: 34 in the league, five in the playoffs, and one in the U.S. Open Cup. He marked his 100th MLS appearance on April 15, playing the full ninety minutes in a 2–1 victory over Toronto FC. Trapp set multiple personal records on the season, tallying his career-high in assists with five, minutes played with more than 3,000, and earning three MLS Team of the Week nods.

Although Trapp remained as captain for the 2018 season, the leadership council behind him was updated, consisting of Ricardo Clark, Higuaín, Hector Jiménez, Jonathan, Zack Steffen, and Williams. On July 21, Trapp scored just his second professional goal, coming in a 3–2 victory against Orlando City. His strike from nearly forty yards out, coming two minutes into second-half stoppage time, handed Crew SC all three points and was named as MLS Goal of the Week.

=== Inter Miami CF ===
On January 31, 2020, Trapp was traded to MLS expansion side Inter Miami CF. In exchange, Columbus received $100,000 in General Allocation Money and an international roster slot.

=== Minnesota United FC ===
On January 5, 2021, Minnesota United FC announced that they had signed Trapp as a free agent.

== International career ==
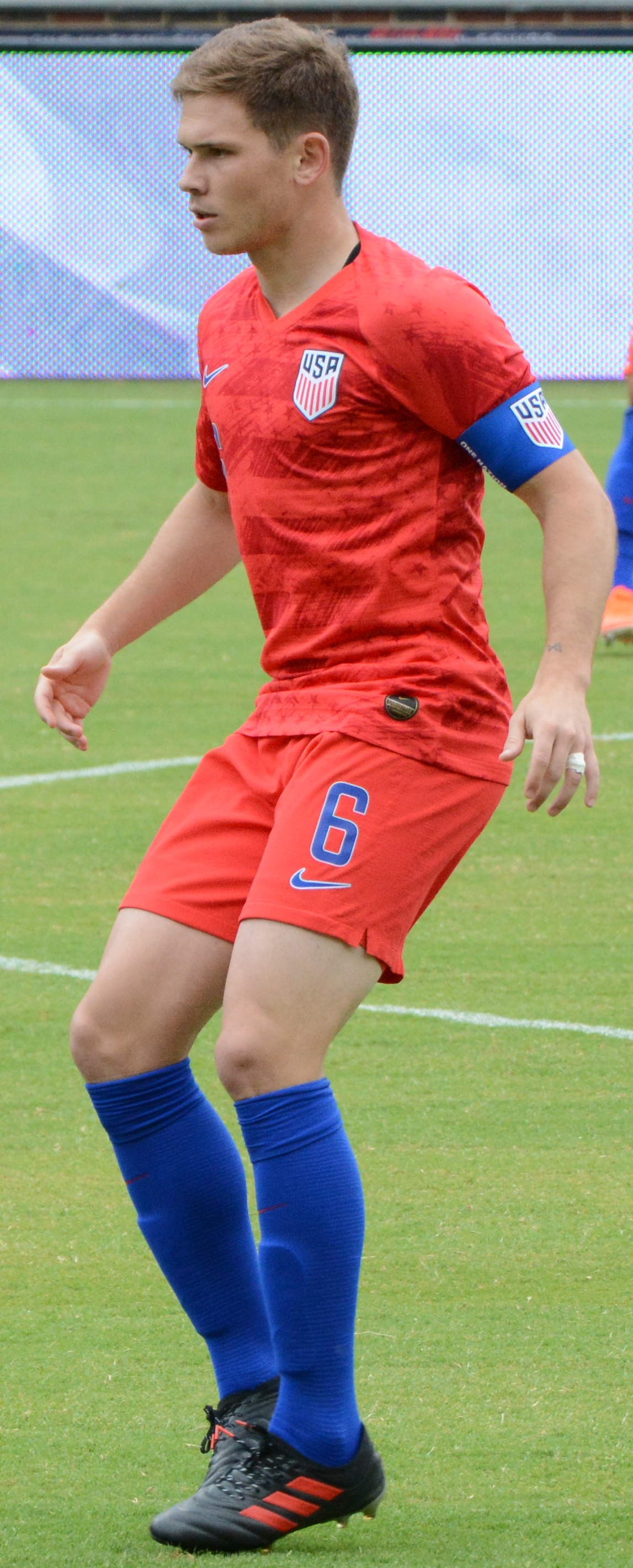
Trapp playing for the United States in 2019

After previously spending time with the U14 and U15 national teams, Trapp received his first men's call-up from the United States U18 national team for the 2011 Lisbon International Tournament. The assistant coach for the Americans at the tournament was Caleb Porter, who Trapp had just committed to play under at Akron. Trapp played twice in Lisbon, coming on as a substitute in the opener against the Netherlands and starting against Portugal. These would mark his only two appearances at U18 level.

Trapp received his first call-up to the U20 national team in January 2012, part of a training camp held in Florida. As the camp did not include a match, Trapp had to wait until June 6 to make his official debut for the team, starting a 4–2 defeat against Uruguay at Estadio Gran Parque Central. Trapp was named in the American squads for the 2013 Toulon Tournament, the 2013 CONCACAF U-20 Championship, and the 2013 FIFA U-20 World Cup. He scored his only goal at U20 level on February 26, 2013, providing the goal to send the U.S. to the U20 World Cup at the expense of Canada in the CONCACAF Championship quarterfinals, and was selected to the tournament's Best XI. Trapp capped his time with the U20s at the World Cup, playing all 270 minutes and captaining the side against France, although the United States failed to progress out of the group stage. He scored one goal in 21 appearances at U20 level, and was named as the U.S. Soccer Young Male Athlete of the Year in 2013.

Although he had already earned his first senior cap, Trapp was called up by the U23 national team for the first time in March 2015. He was a part of the team that placed third at the 2015 CONCACAF Men's Olympic Qualifying Championship, and was then called up to take part in the 2016 CONCACAF–CONMEBOL play-off against Colombia. Trapp wore the captain's armband for both games, culminating in a 3–2 aggregate defeat for the Americans that sent Colombia to the Olympics. He earned seven caps while eligible at U23 level.

=== Senior career ===
Trapp made his debut for the senior national team on January 28, 2015, in a 3–2 friendly defeat at Chile. He came on as a substitute for Mix Diskerud in the 60th minute. Although he earned just one cap in the next two years, Trapp was called back into the side by Dave Sarachan in January 2018. On his first-ever start for the U.S., and just his third cap, Trapp wore the captain's armband against Bosnia and Herzegovina on January 28. He would keep the armband for the next few matches for the United States, notably a 1–1 draw with eventual 2018 FIFA World Cup champions France on 9 June.

== Personal life ==
Trapp is of Greek descent through his maternal grandfather, a former semi-professional soccer player in Greece. In May 2018, Trapp became a Greek citizen and acquired a Greek passport.

== Career statistics ==
=== Club ===
As of match played August 21, 2026

Appearances and goals by club, season and competition
Club	Season	League			Playoffs		U.S. Open Cup		Continental (Note: Includes Leagues Cup)		Total	
Club	Season	Division	Apps	Goals	Apps	Goals	Apps	Goals	Apps	Goals	Apps	Goals
Columbus Crew	2013	MLS	16	0	–		–		–		16	0
Columbus Crew	2014	MLS	28	1	2	0	1	0	–		31	1
Columbus Crew	2015	MLS	19	0	5	0	1	0	–		25	0
Columbus Crew	2016	MLS	30	0	–		2	0	–		32	0
Columbus Crew	2017	MLS	34	0	5	0	1	0	–		40	0
Columbus Crew	2018	MLS	30	1	3	0	–		–		33	1
Columbus Crew	2019	MLS	28	0	–		–		–		28	0
Columbus Crew	Total		185	2	15	0	5	0	–		205	2
Inter Miami	2020	MLS	21	0	1	0	–		–		22	0
Minnesota United	2021	MLS	31	1	1	0	–		–		32	1
Minnesota United	2022	MLS	27	0	1	0	1	0	–		29	0
Minnesota United	2023	MLS	30	0	–		2	0	5	0	37	0
Minnesota United	2024	MLS	27	1	3	0	–		–		30	1
Minnesota United	2025	MLS	34	2	4	0	2	0	2	0	42	2
Minnesota United	2026	MLS	20	0	–		1	0	3	0	24	0
Minnesota United	Total		169	4	10	0	6	0	10	0	194	4
Career total			375	6	25	0	11	0	10	0	421	6

=== International ===
As of match played September 6, 2019

Appearances and goals by national team and year
National team	Year	Apps	Goals
United States	2015	1	0
United States	2016	1	0
United States	2018	9	0
United States	2019	9	0
Total		20	0

== Honors ==
Columbus Crew SC

- Eastern Conference (Playoffs): 2015

Individual

- Mid-American Conference Men's Soccer Newcomer of the Year: 2011
- CONCACAF U-20 Championship Best XI: 2013
- U.S. Soccer Young Male Athlete of the Year: 2013
- MLS All-Star: 2016
