= 2024 Minnesota United FC season =

Minnesota United FC
2024 season
- Owner: Bill McGuire
- Head coach: Eric Ramsay
- Stadium: Allianz Field
- Major League Soccer: Conference: 6th Overall: 11th
- MLS Cup Playoffs: Conference Semifinals
- Leagues Cup: Group Stage
- Top goalscorer: League: Bongokuhle Hlongwane (11); All: Bongokuhle Hlongwane (11)
- Highest home attendance: 19,912
- Lowest home attendance: 18,722
- Average home league attendance: 19,584
- Biggest win: MIN 4-1 STL (10/19)
- Biggest defeat: MIN 2-6 LA (11/24)
Home colors	Away colors

The 2024 Minnesota United FC season was the club's fifteenth season of existence, and eighth in Major League Soccer. Their season began on February 24, 2024, where they faced Austin FC in Austin, Texas. The club played its home matches at Allianz Field in Saint Paul, Minnesota. The Loons qualified for the MLS Cup Playoffs after missing the playoffs the year before, and won their first playoff series since 2020.

On February 26, the club announced Eric Ramsay as the new head coach. Prior to Ramsay's hiring, interim head coach Cameron Knowles managed the first three matches of the season.

== Technical Staff ==
As of March 13th, 2024

Position	Name
Chief Soccer Officer and Sporting Director	(Lebanon) Khaled El-Ahmad
Head coach	(Wales) Eric Ramsay
Assistant Coach	(New Zealand) Cameron Knowles
Assistant Coach	(Trinidad and Tobago) Dennis Lawrence
Goalkeeping Coach	(England) Thomas Fawdry

== Roster ==
As of November 5th, 2024

No.	Name	Nationality	Position(s)	Date of birth (age)	Height	Signed In	Signed from	Transfer Fee	Contract start	Contract Length	Ref.
Goalkeepers
1	Clint Irwin	USA	GK	April 1, 1989 (age 37)	6 ft 3 in	2023	(United States) Colorado Rapids	Free	2023	2+1	
30	Alec Smir	USA	GK	April 13, 1999 (age 27)	6 ft 2 in	2024	(United States) Minnesota United FC 2	Free	2024	1+2	
97	Dayne St. Clair	CAN	GK	May 9, 1997 (age 29)	6 ft 3 in	2019	(United States) Maryland Terrapins	Draft	2022	3+1	
Defenders
2	Devin Padelford (HGP)	USA	DF	January 3, 2003 (age 23)	6 ft 0 in	2022	(United States) MNUFC Academy	Free	2022	3+2	
3	Zarek Valentin	PUR	DF	August 6, 1991 (age 35)	6 ft 0 in	2023	(United States) Houston Dynamo FC	Free	2023	1+1	
4	Miguel Tapias (INT)	MEX	DF	January 9, 1997 (age 29)	5 ft 10 in	2023	(Mexico) C.F. Pachuca	Free	2023	3+1	
5	Ethan Bristow	SKN	DF	November 27, 2001 (age 24)	6 ft 2 in	2023	(England) Tranmere Rovers F.C.	Undisclosed	2023	3+1	
12	Derek Dodson	USA	DF	November 3, 1998 (age 27)	6 ft 1 in	2024	(United States) Charleston Battery	Free	2024	1+2	
13	Anthony Markanich	USA	DF	December 26, 1999 (age 26)	6 ft 1 in	2024	(United States) St. Louis City SC	Trade	2022	1+3	
15	Michael Boxall	NZL	DF	August 18, 1988 (age 38)	6 ft 2 in	2017	(South Africa) SuperSport United	Free	2024	2+1	
18	Matúš Kmeť (INT)	SVK	DF	June 27, 2000 (age 26)	5 ft 8 in	2024	(Slovakia) AS Trenčín	Transfer	2024	3+1	
23	Morris Duggan (on loan at Rhode Island FC)	GER	DF	October 24, 2000 (age 25)	6 ft 4 in	2024	(United States) Marshall Thundering Herd	Draft	2024	1+3	
24	Hugo Bacharach	ESP	DF	July 27, 2001 (age 25)	6 ft 4 in	2024	(United States) Indiana Hoosiers	Draft	2024	1+3	
27	DJ Taylor	USA	DF	August 26, 1997 (age 29)	5 ft 9 in	2021	(United States) North Carolina FC	Free	2024	2+1	
28	Jefferson Díaz (INT)	COL	DF	December 5, 2000 (age 25)	6 ft 1 in	2024	(Colombia) Deportivo Cali	Transfer	2024	4+1	
Midfielders
7	Franco Fragapane	ARG	MF	February 6, 1993 (age 33)	5 ft 5 in	2021	(Argentina) Talleres	$1.8M	2021	4	
8	Joseph Rosales	HON	MF	November 6, 2000 (age 25)	5 ft 11 in	2021	(Panama) Independiente	Undisclosed	2025	3+1	
17	Robin Lod	FIN	MF	April 17, 1993 (age 33)	5 ft 11 in	2019	(Spain) Sporting Gijón	$500K	2023	3+1	
20	Wil Trapp	USA	MF	January 15, 1993 (age 33)	5 ft 8 in	2021	(United States) Inter Miami CF	Free	2024	1+1	
25	Alejandro Bran (on loan at Burton Albion F.C.)	CRC	MF	March 5, 2001 (age 25)	5 ft 9 in	2024	(Costa Rica) C.S. Herediano	Transfer	2024	3+2	
26	Joaquín Pereyra (DP) (INT)	ARG	MF	December 1, 1998 (age 27)	6 ft 1 in	2024	(Argentina) Atlético Tucumán	Undisclosed	2024	4+1	
31	Hassani Dotson	USA	MF	August 6, 1997 (age 29)	5 ft 11 in	2019	(United States) Oregon State Beavers	Draft	2022	3+1	
44	Moses Nyeman	USA	MF	November 5, 2003 (age 22)	5 ft 5 in	2024	(Belgium) S.K. Beveren	Free	2024	1+2	
67	Carlos Harvey	PAN	MF	February 3, 2000 (age 26)	6 ft 1 in	2024	(United States) Phoenix Rising FC	Undisclosed	2024	2+1	
Forwards
9	Kelvin Yeboah (DP) (INT)	ITA	FW	May 6, 2000 (age 26)	6 ft 0 in	2024	(Italy) Genoa CFC	Transfer	2024	4+1	
11	Jeong Sang-bin (INT) (U22)	KOR	FW	April 1, 2002 (age 24)	5 ft 9 in	2023	(England) Wolverhampton Wanderers F.C.	$2.6M	2023	3+1	
14	Tani Oluwaseyi	CAN	FW	May 15, 2000 (age 26)	6 ft 2 in	2022	(United States) St John's Red Storm	Draft	2022	1+3	
19	Samuel Shashoua	ENG	FW	May 13, 1999 (age 27)	5 ft 7 in	2024	(Spain) Albacete Balompié	Free	2024	1+2	
21	Bongokuhle Hlongwane (U22)	RSA	FW	June 20, 2000 (age 26)	6 ft 1 in	2022	(South Africa) Maritzburg United	$500K	2022	3+1	
22	Teemu Pukki (DP) (INT)	FIN	FW	March 29, 1990 (age 36)	5 ft 11 in	2023	(England) Norwich City F.C.	Free	2023	3	
29	Patrick Weah (HGP) (on loan at HB Køge)	LBR	FW	December 5, 2003 (age 22)	6 ft 1 in	2021	(United States) Saint Louis Billikens	Free	2021	4	
90	Loïc Mesanvi	TOG	FW	October 6, 2003 (age 22)	5 ft 8 in	2024	(United States) Minnesota United FC 2	Free	2024	2+2	
99	Jordan Adebayo-Smith	USA	FW	January 11, 2001 (age 25)	5 ft 11 in	2024	(United States) New England Revolution II	Trade	2024	3+1	

== Transfers ==
=== Transfers in ===
Date	Position	No.	Player	From club	Notes	Ref.
September 7, 2023	MF	37	(United States) Caden Clark	(Germany) RB Leipzig	Transfer	
January 15, 2024	DF	12	(United States) Derek Dodson	(United States) Charleston Battery	Free Agent	
January 15, 2024	FW	99	(United States) Jordan Adebayo-Smith	(United States) New England Revolution II	Trade	
January 24, 2024	MF	67	(Panama) Carlos Harvey	(United States) Phoenix Rising FC	Transfer	
January 25, 2024	DF	40	(Sweden) Victor Eriksson	(Sweden) IFK Värnamo	Free Agent	
January 25, 2024	MF	44	(United States) Moses Nyeman	(Belgium) S.K. Beveren	Free Agent	
June 15, 2024	GK	30	(United States) Alec Smir	(United States) Minnesota United FC 2	First Team Contract	
July 18, 2024	FW	19	(England) Samuel Shashoua	(Spain) Albacete Balompié	Free Agent	
July 27, 2024	FW	9	(Italy) Kelvin Yeboah	(Italy) Genoa CFC	Transfer	
July 29, 2024	DF	28	(Colombia) Jefferson Díaz	(Colombia) Deportivo Cali	Transfer	
August 5, 2024	DF	18	(Slovakia) Matúš Kmeť	(Slovakia) AS Trenčín	Transfer	
August 15, 2024	MF	26	(Argentina) Joaquín Pereyra	(Argentina) Atlético Tucumán	Transfer	
August 15, 2024	DF	13	(United States) Anthony Markanich	(United States) St. Louis City SC	Trade	
August 23, 2024	FW	90	(Togo) Loïc Mesanvi	(United States) Minnesota United FC 2	First Team Contract	
September 5, 2024	MF	25	(Costa Rica) Alejandro Bran	(Costa Rica) C.S. Herediano	Loan Made Permanent	

=== MLS SuperDraft ===
Round	Pick	Player	Position	Previous club	Status	Ref
1	9	(Spain) Hugo Bacharach	Defender	Indiana	Signed	
1	20	(Canada) Marcus Caldeira	Forward	West Virginia	Un-signed	
3	67	(Germany) Morris Duggan	Defender	Marshall	Signed	
3	78	(Senegal) Babacar Niang	Midfielder	Wake Forest	Un-signed	

=== Transfers out ===
Date	Position	No.	Player	To club	Notes	Ref.
December 1, 2023	DF	12	(Mali) Bakaye Dibassy	Free Agent	Option Declined	
December 1, 2023	FW	28	(Colombia) Ménder García	(Colombia) Independiente Medellín	Option Declined	
December 1, 2023	MF	24	(Slovakia) Ján Greguš	(United States) Houston Dynamo	Option Declined	
December 1, 2023	GK	13	(United States) Eric Dick	(United States) Pittsburgh Riverhounds SC	Option Declined	
December 1, 2023	MF	42	(Nigeria) Emmanuel Iwe	(Germany) SV Sandhausen	Option Declined	
December 1, 2023	DF	26	(South Sudan) Ryen Jiba	(United States) Union Omaha	Option Declined	
December 1, 2023	MF	18	(Libya) Ismael Tajouri-Shradi	Free Agent	Option Declined	
December 1, 2023	GK	99	(Luxembourg) Fred Emmings	(United States) Minnesota United FC 2	Option Declined	
December 1, 2023	DF	14	(United States) Brent Kallman	(United States) Nashville SC	Contract Expired	
December 1, 2023	MF	23	(United States) Cameron Dunbar	(United States) Orange County SC	Contract Expired	
May 30, 2024	MF	10	(Argentina) Emanuel Reynoso	(Mexico) Club Tijuana	Transfer	
June 29, 2024	DF	40	(Sweden) Victor Eriksson	(Sweden) Hammarby IF	Transfer	
June 30, 2024	MF	33	(Honduras) Kervin Arriaga	(Serbia) FK Partizan	Transfer	
August 8, 2024	MF	37	(United States) Caden Clark	(Canada) CF Montréal	Trade	
November 5, 2024	DF	6	(Sweden) Mikael Marqués	(Sweden) Västerås SK Fotboll	Transfer	

=== Loans in ===
Start date	End date	Position	No.	Player	From club	Ref.
January 16	End of 2024 Season	MF	25	(Costa Rica) Alejandro Bran	(Costa Rica) C.S. Herediano	
Short-Term February 24		FW	90	(Togo) Loïc Mesanvi	(United States) Minnesota United FC 2	
Short-Term March 2		FW	90	(Togo) Loïc Mesanvi	(United States) Minnesota United FC 2	
Short-Term April 27		GK	30	(United States) Alec Smir	(United States) Minnesota United FC 2	
Short-Term May 4		GK	30	(United States) Alec Smir	(United States) Minnesota United FC 2	
Short-Term June 8		GK	30	(United States) Alec Smir	(United States) Minnesota United FC 2	
Short-Term June 8		MF	36	(Trinidad and Tobago) Molik Khan	(United States) Minnesota United FC 2	
Short-Term June 8		MF	38	(United States) Kage Romanshyn Jr.	(United States) Minnesota United FC 2	
Short-Term June 8		DF	23	(Germany) Morris Duggan	(United States) Minnesota United FC 2	
Short-Term June 15		DF	23	(Germany) Morris Duggan	(United States) Minnesota United FC 2	
Short-Term June 15		MF	38	(United States) Kage Romanshyn Jr.	(United States) Minnesota United FC 2	
Short-Term June 19		MF	38	(United States) Kage Romanshyn Jr.	(United States) Minnesota United FC 2	
Short-Term June 19		MF	36	(Trinidad and Tobago) Molik Khan	(United States) Minnesota United FC 2	
Short-Term June 19		DF	39	(Scotland) Finn McRobb	(United States) Minnesota United FC 2	
Short-Term June 29		MF	34	(United States) Rory O'Driscoll	(United States) Minnesota United FC 2	
Short-Term July 3		GK	63	(United States) Oscar Herrera	(United States) Minnesota United FC 2	
Short-Term July 7		GK	98	(United States) Francesco Montali	(United States) Minnesota United FC 2	
Short-Term July 13		GK	98	(United States) Francesco Montali	(United States) Minnesota United FC 2	
Short-Term July 26		FW	90	(Togo) Loïc Mesanvi	(United States) Minnesota United FC 2	
Short-Term July 30		FW	90	(Togo) Loïc Mesanvi	(United States) Minnesota United FC 2	

=== Loans out ===
Start date	End date	Position	No.	Player	To club	Ref.
December 28, 2023	End of 2024 Season	DF	5	(Saint Kitts and Nevis) Ethan Bristow	(England) Stockport County F.C.	
February 14, 2024	End of 2024 Season	DF	6	(Sweden) Mikael Marqués	(Sweden) Västerås SK Fotboll	
May 22, 2024	End of 2024 Season	DF	12	(United States) Derek Dodson	(United States) Birmingham Legion FC	
August 9, 2024	End of 2024 Season	FW	29	(Liberia) Patrick Weah	(Denmark) HB Køge	
August 9, 2024	End of 2024 Season	DF	23	(Germany) Morris Duggan	(United States) Rhode Island FC	
September 5, 2024	Summer 2025	MF	25	(Costa Rica) Alejandro Bran	(England) Burton Albion F.C.	

== Friendlies ==
Win Draw Loss

January 24 Friendly	Minnesota United FC	7–0	Sporting Arizona FC

January 27 Friendly	Minnesota United FC	1–1	CF Montréal

February 10 Friendly	Minnesota United FC	2–1	Phoenix Rising FC

February 14 Friendly	Minnesota United FC	0–4	Chicago Fire FC

February 17 Friendly	Minnesota United FC	0–0	Charlotte FC

March 20 Friendly	Minnesota United FC (United States)	1–0	(Republic of Ireland) St Patrick's Athletic	St. Paul, Minnesota
19:00 CST	Arriaga 57'			Stadium: Allianz Field

== Competitions ==
=== MLS regular season ===
==== Standings ====
===== Overall =====
Overall MLS standings table
Pos	Team	Pld	W	L	T	GF	GA	GD	Pts	Qualification
8	Houston Dynamo FC	34	15	10	9	47	39	+8	54	Qualification for the U.S. Open Cup Round of 32 (Note: As one of the best U.S. teams in the overall table to not qualify for the 2025 CONCACAF Champions Cup)
9	Orlando City SC	34	15	12	7	59	50	+9	52	Qualification for the U.S. Open Cup Round of 32
10	Minnesota United FC	34	15	12	7	58	49	+9	52	Qualification for the U.S. Open Cup Round of 32
11	Charlotte FC	34	14	11	9	46	37	+9	51	Qualification for the U.S. Open Cup Round of 32
12	Colorado Rapids	34	15	14	5	61	60	+1	50	Qualification for the CONCACAF Champions Cup Round One (Note: As third place of Leagues Cup)

Source: MLS
Rules for classification: 1) points; 2) total wins; 3) total goal differential; 4) total goals scored; 5) fewer disciplinary points; 6) away goal differential; 7) away goals scored; 8) home goals differential; 9) home goals scored; 10) coin toss (2 clubs tied) or drawing of lots (≥3 clubs tied)

===== Western Conference =====
MLS Western Conference table (2024)
Pos	Team	Pld	W	L	T	GF	GA	GD	Pts	Qualification
1	Los Angeles FC	34	19	8	7	63	43	+20	64	Qualification for round one, the 2025 Leagues Cup and the CONCACAF Champions Cup round one
2	LA Galaxy	34	19	8	7	69	50	+19	64	Qualification for round one and the 2025 Leagues Cup
3	Real Salt Lake	34	16	7	11	65	48	+17	59	Qualification for round one and the 2025 Leagues Cup
4	Seattle Sounders FC	34	16	9	9	51	35	+16	57	Qualification for round one and the 2025 Leagues Cup
5	Houston Dynamo FC	34	15	10	9	47	39	+8	54	Qualification for round one and the 2025 Leagues Cup
6	Minnesota United FC	34	15	12	7	58	49	+9	52	Qualification for round one and the 2025 Leagues Cup
7	Colorado Rapids	34	15	14	5	61	60	+1	50	Qualification for round one and the 2025 Leagues Cup
8	Vancouver Whitecaps FC	34	13	13	8	52	49	+3	47	Qualification for the wild-card round (Note: Vancouver Whitecaps FC did not qualify for the Leagues Cup due to winning the 2024 Canadian Championship, giving them a place in the 2025 CONCACAF Champions Cup. As MLS teams can participate in no more than two cup competitions, their spot in Leagues Cup was given to San Diego FC.)
9	Portland Timbers	34	12	11	11	65	56	+9	47	Qualification for the wild-card round and the 2025 Leagues Cup
10	Austin FC	34	11	14	9	39	48	−9	42	
11	FC Dallas	34	11	15	8	54	56	−2	41	
12	St. Louis City SC	34	8	13	13	50	63	−13	37	
13	Sporting Kansas City	34	8	19	7	51	66	−15	31	

Source: MLS
Rules for classification: 1) points; 2) total wins; 3) total goal differential; 4) total goals scored; 5) fewer disciplinary points; 6) away goal differential; 7) away goals scored; 8) home goals differential; 9) home goals scored; 10) coin toss (2 clubs tied) or drawing of lots (≥3 clubs tied)

==== Results summary ====
Overall								Home						Away					
Pld	Pts	W	L	T	GF	GA	GD	W	L	T	GF	GA	GD	W	L	T	GF	GA	GD
34	52	15	12	7	58	49	+9	7	6	4	30	23	+7	8	6	3	28	26	+2

Last updated: October 19, 2024
Source: MLS Results
Pld = Matches played; Pts = Points; W = Matches won; T = Matches tied; L = Matches lost; GF = Goals for; GA = Goals against; GD = Goal difference

==== Regular season ====
February 24 1	Austin FC	1–2	Minnesota United FC	Austin, Texas
7:30 PM CT	Valencia (yellow card) 70'; Rubio (yellow card) 84'; Biro 90+5'	Report	Lod 34'; Rosales (yellow card) 56'; Clark (yellow card) 82'; Bran 90+1'	Stadium: Q2 Stadium; Attendance: 20,738; Referee: Trevor Wiseman

March 2 2	Minnesota United FC	1–1	Columbus Crew	St. Paul, Minnesota
1:00 PM CT	Taylor (yellow card) 54'; Oluwaseyi 90+5'	Report	Hernández 59'	Stadium: Allianz Field; Attendance: 19,906; Referee: Amin Hadzic

March 9 3	Orlando City SC	2–3	Minnesota United FC	Orlando, Florida
6:30 PM CT	McGuire 1', 83'; Martins (yellow card) 35'; Cartagena (red card) 90+10'	Report	Pukki 4', 38'; Trapp (yellow card) 32'; Boxall (yellow card) 43'; Taylor (yellow card) 70'; Arriaga (yellow card) 79'; St. Clair (yellow card) 90+2'; Hlongwane 90+6' (yellow card) 90+6'; Rosales (red card) 90+10'	Stadium: Inter&Co Stadium; Attendance: 23,025; Referee: Wilmer Pino Mercado

March 16 4	Minnesota United FC	2–0	Los Angeles FC	St. Paul, Minnesota
7:30 PM CT	Lod 16'; Clark (yellow card) 32'; Oluwaseyi (yellow card) 86'; Hlongwane 88'	Report	Murillo (yellow card) 22'; Atuesta (yellow card) 90+3'	Stadium: Allianz Field; Attendance: 19,315; Referee: Kyle Johnston

March 30 5	Philadelphia Union	2–0	Minnesota United FC	Chester, Pennsylvania
1:00 PM CT	Gazdag 16'; Martínez (yellow card) 64'; Carranza 84'; Harriel (yellow card) 90+5'	Report	Dotson (yellow card) 69'	Stadium: Subaru Park; Attendance: 19,047; Referee: Sergii Boiko

April 6 6	Minnesota United FC	1–1	Real Salt Lake	St. Paul, Minnesota
7:30 PM CT	Rosales (yellow card) 40' (red card) 89'; Trapp (yellow card) 45+1'; Oluwaseyi 87'	Report	Arango 24'; Katranis (yellow card) 64'; MacMath (yellow card) 82'; Eneli (yellow card) 90+2'	Stadium: Allianz Field; Attendance: 19,568; Referee: Mark Allatin

April 13 7	Minnesota United FC	1–2	Houston Dynamo	St. Paul, Minnesota
7:30 PM CT	Boxall (yellow card) 56'; Fragapane 70'	Report	Carrasquilla (yellow card) 23'; Bran 38' (o.g.); Micael (yellow card) 40'; Kowalczyk (yellow card) 74' (goal) 77'; Steres (yellow card) 88'	Stadium: Allianz Field; Attendance: 19,658; Referee: Filip Dujic

April 21 8	Charlotte FC	0–3	Minnesota United FC	Charlotte, North Carolina
5:00 PM CT	Petković (yellow card) 83'	Report	Oluwaseyi 31'; Lod 49'; Dotson 54'; Bran (yellow card) 90+3'	Stadium: Bank of America Stadium; Attendance: 27,021; Referee: Pierre-Luc Lauziere
Note: Originally scheduled for April 20 and moved to April 21.

April 27 9	Minnesota United FC	2–1	Sporting Kansas City	St. Paul, Minnesota
7:30 PM CT	Boxall 2' (yellow card) 63'; Oluwaseyi 25'; Padelford (yellow card) 32'	Report	Fontàs (yellow card) 23'; Pulido 38'	Stadium: Allianz Field; Attendance: 19,712; Referee: Ted Unkel

May 4 10	Atlanta United FC	1–2	Minnesota United FC	Atlanta, Georgia
6:30 PM CT	Abram (yellow card) 20'; Lobzhanidze 82'	Report	Arriaga 54' (yellow card) 90+8'; Oluwaseyi 60'	Stadium: Mercedes-Benz Stadium; Attendance: 43,338; Referee: Guido Gonzales, Jr.

May 15 11	Minnesota United FC	2–2	LA Galaxy	St. Paul, Minnesota
7:30 PM CT	Hlongwane 30'; Oluwaseyi (yellow card) 45'; Rosales (yellow card) 58'; Arriaga 80'	Report	Joveljić 61'; Fagúndez 68' (yellow card) 90+6'	Stadium: Allianz Field; Attendance: 18,722; Referee: Lukasz Szpala

May 18 12	Minnesota United FC	2–1	Portland Timbers	St. Paul, Minnesota
7:30 PM CT	Tapias (yellow card) 42' (yellow-red card) 90+1'; Lod 65'; Jeong Sang-bin 82' (yellow card) 90+8'; Trapp (yellow card) 90+13'	Report	Rodríguez 17' (yellow card) 42'; Evander (yellow card) 44'; Chará (yellow card) 67'; Araujo (yellow card) 67'; Asprilla (yellow card) 82'	Stadium: Allianz Field; Attendance: 19,735; Referee: Jair Marrufo

May 25 13	Colorado Rapids	3–3	Minnesota United FC	Commerce City, Colorado
8:30 PM CT	Cabral 18', 71'; Navarro 62'	Report	Jeong Sang-bin 8', 33'; Oluwaseyi 27'; Rosales (yellow card) 53'; Taylor (yellow card) 67'; Arriaga (yellow card) 69'; Padelford (yellow card) 74'	Stadium: Dick's Sporting Goods Park; Attendance: 16,201; Referee: Filip Dujic

May 29 14	Los Angeles FC	2–0	Minnesota United FC	Los Angeles, California
9:30 PM CT	Bouanga 38' (pen.); Bogusz 82'	Report	Trapp (yellow card) 36'; Adebayo-Smith (yellow card) 80'	Stadium: BMO Stadium; Attendance: 22,010; Referee: Timothy Ford

June 1 15	Minnesota United FC	3–1	Sporting Kansas City	St. Paul, Minnesota
7:30 PM CT	Padelford (yellow card) 16'; Harvey (yellow card) 25'; Oluwaseyi 33', (yellow card) 64'; Lod 67'; Arriaga 83'; Rosales (yellow card) 88'	Report	Radoja (yellow card) 32'; Russell 86'	Stadium: Allianz Field; Attendance: 19,738; Referee: Joe Dickerson

June 8 16	Minnesota United FC	1–1	FC Dallas	St. Paul, Minnesota
7:30 PM CT	Dotson 9'; Fragapane (yellow card) 43'; Trapp (yellow card) 45+2'	Report	Fraser 15'	Stadium: Allianz Field; Attendance: 19,759; Referee: Marcos DeOliveira II

June 15 17	Seattle Sounders FC	2–0	Minnesota United FC	Seattle, Washington
9:30 PM CT	Morris 28'; Rothrock 57'	Report	Tapias (yellow card) 27'; Clark (yellow card) 59'; Nyeman (red card) 90'	Stadium: Lumen Field; Attendance: 31,026; Referee: Rosendo Mendoza

June 19 18	FC Dallas	5–3	Minnesota United FC	Frisco, Texas
7:30 PM CT	Musa 17', 38', 62'; Illarramendi (yellow card) 52'; Ferreira 75'; Farrington 90' (yellow card) 90+8'	Report	Hlongwane 32'; Dotson 57'; Boxall (yellow card) 68'; Trapp 90+9' (pen.)	Stadium: Toyota Stadium; Attendance: 19,096; Referee: Sergii Demianchuk

June 22 19	Minnesota United FC	0–1	Austin FC	St. Paul, Minnesota
7:30 PM CT	Tapias (yellow card) 12'; Dotson (yellow card) 25' (yellow-red card) 26'; Lod (yellow card) 90+2'	Report	Rubio 31'; Obrian (yellow card) 49'; Fodrey (yellow card) 59'	Stadium: Allianz Field; Attendance: 19,746; Referee: Drew Fischer

June 29 20	Portland Timbers	3–2	Minnesota United FC	Portland, Oregon
9:30 PM CT	Evander 45+8' (pen.); Moreno 73'; Rodríguez 90+2'	Report	Hlongwane 29'; Jeong Sang-bin 38'	Stadium: Providence Park; Attendance: 22,227; Referee: Timothy Ford

July 3 21	Minnesota United FC	1–3	Vancouver Whitecaps FC	St. Paul, Minnesota
7:30 PM CT	Jeong Sang-bin (yellow card) 13'; Bran (yellow card) 23'; Hlongwane 30'; Boxall (yellow card) 39'; Adebayo-Smith (yellow card) 90+6'	Report	White 4' (yellow card) 28'; Laborda 17' (yellow card) 81'; Gauld (yellow card) 45+4'; Berhalter 60'	Stadium: Allianz Field; Attendance: 19,684; Referee: Victor Rivas

July 7 22	LA Galaxy	2–1	Minnesota United FC	Carson, California
9:30 PM CT	Nelson (yellow card) 20'; Puig (yellow card) 22'; Pec 25', 90'	Report	Pukki 73'; Jeong Sang-bin (yellow card) 89'	Stadium: Dignity Health Sports Park; Attendance: 19,302; Referee: Pierre-Luc Lauziere

July 13 23	Houston Dynamo FC	1–1	Minnesota United FC	Houston, Texas
7:30 PM CT	Dorsey (yellow card) 36'; Ferreira 82'; Bassi (yellow card) 87'	Report	Lod 70'; Padelford (yellow card) 90+4'	Stadium: Shell Energy Stadium; Attendance: 17,142; Referee: Jon Freemon

July 17 24	Minnesota United FC	2–3	D.C. United	Saint Paul, Minnesota
8:30 PM EDT	Oluwaseyi 32'; Boxall (yellow card) 49'; Pukki 80'	Report	Benteke 14', 90+1'; Rodriguez (yellow card) 86'; Herrera 90'	Stadium: Allianz Field; Attendance: 19,742; Referee: Ricardo Fierro

July 20 25	Minnesota United FC	2–0	San Jose Earthquakes	St. Paul, Minnesota
7:30 PM CT	Bran (yellow card) 25'; Beason 38' (o.g.); Rosales (yellow card) 59'; Lod (yellow card) 68'; Hlongwane 75'	Report	Gruezo (yellow card) 45'; Judd (yellow card) 79'	Stadium: Allianz Field; Attendance: 19,679; Referee: Ismir Pekmic

August 24 26	Minnesota United FC	2–3	Seattle Sounders FC	St. Paul, Minnesota
5:30 PM CT	Yeboah 24' (pen.), 56'; Tapias (yellow card) 72'	Report	Nouhou (yellow card) 10'; Morris 11'; Ragen 28'; Rusnák 75'	Stadium: Allianz Field; Attendance: 19,751; Referee: Guido Gonzales, Jr.

August 31 27	San Jose Earthquakes	1–2	Minnesota United FC	San Jose, California
9:30 PM CT	Bouda 33'; Gruezo (yellow card) 87'	Report	Hlongwane 9', 64'; Díaz (yellow card) 79'	Stadium: PayPal Park; Referee: Sergii Demianchuk

September 14 28	St. Louis City SC	1–3	Minnesota United FC	St. Louis, Missouri
7:30 PM CT	Teuchert 4'; Löwen (yellow card) 90+1'	Report	Boxall (yellow card) 20'; Hlongwane 24'; Reid 52' (o.g.); Yeboah 62' (pen.); Jeong Sang-bin (yellow card) 90+4'	Stadium: CityPark; Attendance: 22,423; Referee: Marcos DeOliveira II

September 18 29	Minnesota United FC	1–2	FC Cincinnati	St. Paul, Minnesota
7:30 PM CT	Pereyra (yellow card) 15'; Yeboah 54' (pen.)	Report	Yedlin (yellow card) 16'; Kubo 34'; Orellano 45+1'; Murphy (yellow card) 68'; Bucha (yellow card) 73'	Stadium: Allianz Field; Attendance: 19,649; Referee: Drew Fischer

September 21 30	Sporting Kansas City	0–2	Minnesota United FC	Kansas City, Kansas
7:30 PM CT	Davis (yellow card) 36'	Report	Yeboah 65'; Tapias (yellow card) 79'; Hlongwane 90+4'	Stadium: Children's Mercy Park; Attendance: 17,328; Referee: Ismir Pekmic

September 28 31	Minnesota United FC	3–0	Colorado Rapids	St. Paul, Minnesota
7:30 PM CT	Yeboah 16', 47'; Hlongwane (yellow card) 25'; Díaz (yellow card) 79'; Dotson 82'; Boxall (yellow card) 90+1'	Report	Cannon (yellow card) 52'; Harris (yellow card) 90+6'	Stadium: Allianz Field; Attendance: 19,814; Referee: Lorenzo Hernandez

October 2 32	Real Salt Lake	0–0	Minnesota United FC	Sandy, Utah
8:30 PM CT	Vera (yellow card) 32' (red card) 90+3'; Arango (yellow card) 90'	Report	Díaz (yellow card) 5'; Dotson (yellow card) 24'; Yeboah (yellow card) 34'; Boxall (yellow card) 89'	Stadium: America First Field; Attendance: 19,346; Referee: Ricardo Montero

October 5 33	Vancouver Whitecaps FC	0–1	Minnesota United FC	Vancouver, British Columbia
6:30 PM CT	Veselinović (yellow card) 18'; Raposo (yellow card) 79'	Report	Dotson 24' (pen.); Oluwaseyi (yellow card) 45+5'; Yeboah (yellow card) 69'; St. Clair (yellow card) 75'; Díaz (yellow card) 77'	Stadium: BC Place; Attendance: 21,349; Referee: Ramy Touchan

October 19 34	Minnesota United FC	4–1	St. Louis City SC	St. Paul, Minnesota
8:00 PM CT	Lod 21'; Pereyra (yellow card) 59'; Yeboah (yellow card) 66'; Jeong Sang-bin 72', 83'; Kessler 78' (o.g.)	Report	Alm (yellow card) 74'; Hartel 75'	Stadium: Allianz Field; Attendance: 19,881; Referee: Lukasz Szpala

=== MLS Cup playoffs ===
==== Round One ====
October 29 Match 1	Real Salt Lake	0–0 (4–5 p)	Minnesota United FC	Sandy, Utah
8:00 PM CT		Report	Díaz (yellow card) 8'; Trapp (yellow card) 80'	Stadium: America First Field; Attendance: 19,195; Referee: Pierre-Luc Lauzière
	Penalties
	Arango (penalty scored); Gonçalves (penalty scored); Glad (penalty missed); Julio (penalty scored); Eneli (penalty scored); Ojeda (penalty missed)		(penalty scored) Yeboah; (penalty scored) Trapp; (penalty missed) Boxall; (penalty scored) Jeong Sang-bin; (penalty scored) Oluwaseyi; (penalty scored) Díaz

November 2 Match 2	Minnesota United FC	1–1 (3–1 p)	Real Salt Lake	St. Paul, Minnesota
8:00 PM CT	Rosales 53'	Report	Eneli 75'; Crooks (yellow card) 90+9'	Stadium: Allianz Field; Attendance: 19,912; Referee: Tori Penso
	Penalties
	Yeboah (penalty scored); Dotson (penalty scored); Trapp (penalty missed); Jeong Sang-bin (penalty scored)		(penalty scored) Arango; (penalty missed) Gonçalves; (penalty missed) Crooks; (penalty missed) Luna
Note: Minnesota United FC won the series 2–0.

==== Conference Semifinals ====
November 24 Conference Semifinals	LA Galaxy	6–2	Minnesota United FC	Carson, California
5:00 PM CT	Pec 1', 50'; Joveljić 18', 89'; Paintsil 37', 86' (yellow card) 45'; Puig (yellow card) 58'; Delgado (yellow card) 90+4'	Report	Yeboah 6', 45+4' (pen.); Hlongwane (yellow card) 53'; Dotson (yellow card) 62'; Díaz (yellow card) 68' (yellow-red card) 82'	Stadium: Dignity Health Sports Park; Attendance: 26,192; Referee: Rosendo Mendoza

=== U.S. Open Cup ===
Minnesota United FC was not sent to the tournament, but their MLS Next Pro team Minnesota United FC 2 was sent instead following the deal reached on March 1, 2024.

=== Leagues Cup ===
==== West 6 ====
Pos	Team	Pld	W	PW	PL	L	GF	GA	GD	Pts	Qualification	NEC	SEA	MIN
1	(Mexican Football Federation) Necaxa	2	1	0	0	1	3	2	+1	3	Advance to knockout stage	—	—	—
2	(United States Soccer Federation) Seattle Sounders FC	2	1	0	0	1	3	3	0	3	Advance to knockout stage	1–3	—	2–0
3	(United States Soccer Federation) Minnesota United FC	2	1	0	0	1	1	2	−1	3		1–0	—	—

Source: Leagues Cup
Rules for classification: Tiebreakers

July 26 Group stage	Seattle Sounders FC (United States)	2–0	(United States) Minnesota United FC	Seattle, Washington
9:00 PM CDT	Nouhou (yellow card) 43'; Morris 87'; Rothrock 90+4'	Report	Harvey (yellow card) 41'; Dotson (red card) 65'	Stadium: Lumen Field; Referee: Joe Dickerson

July 30 Group stage	Minnesota United FC (United States)	1–0	(Mexico) Necaxa	St. Paul, Minnesota
8:00 PM CDT	Lod 10' (pen.); Bacharach (red card) 20'; Rosales (yellow card) 66'; St. Clair (yellow card) 77'	Report	Cambindo (yellow card) 17'; Arce (yellow card) 52'	Stadium: Allianz Field; Attendance: 18,128; Referee: Sergio Reyna

== Statistics ==
=== Appearances and goals ===
Last updated November 24th, 2024.

No.	Pos	Nat	Player	Total		Major League Soccer		Leagues Cup		Playoffs	
No.	Pos	Nat	Player	Apps	Goals	Apps	Goals	Apps	Goals	Apps	Goals
Goalkeepers
1	GK	(United States) USA	Clint Irwin	5	0	5	0	0	0	0	0
30	GK	(United States) USA	Alec Smir	3	0	3	0	0	0	0	0
97	GK	(Canada) CAN	Dayne St. Clair	31	0	26	0	2	0	3	0
Defenders
2	DF	(United States) USA	Devin Padelford	26	0	19+5	0	1+1	0	0	0
3	DF	(Puerto Rico) PUR	Zarek Valentin	5	0	0+4	0	0+1	0	0	0
4	DF	(Mexico) MEX	Miguel Tapias	27	0	23+2	0	2	0	0	0
5	DF	(Saint Kitts and Nevis) SKN	Ethan Bristow	0	0	0	0	0	0	0	0
12	DF	(United States) USA	Derek Dodson	0	0	0	0	0	0	0	0
13	DF	(United States) USA	Anthony Markanich	4	0	1+1	0	0	0	0+2	0
15	DF	(New Zealand) NZL	Michael Boxall	35	1	32	1	0	0	3	0
18	DF	(Slovakia) SVK	Matúš Kmeť	0	0	0	0	0	0	0	0
23	DF	(Germany) GER	Morris Duggan	4	0	0+2	0	1+1	0	0	0
24	DF	(Spain) ESP	Hugo Bacharach	3	0	1	0	2	0	0	0
27	DF	(United States) USA	DJ Taylor	25	0	17+7	0	0+1	0	0	0
28	DF	(Colombia) COL	Jefferson Díaz	12	0	9	0	0	0	3	0
Midfielders
7	MF	(Argentina) ARG	Franco Fragapane	26	1	7+17	1	1+1	0	0	0
8	MF	(Honduras) HON	Joseph Rosales	35	1	26+4	0	2	0	3	1
17	MF	(Finland) FIN	Robin Lod	36	8	29+3	7	1	1	3	0
20	MF	(United States) USA	Wil Trapp	30	1	26+1	1	0	0	3	0
25	MF	(Costa Rica) CRC	Alejandro Bran	13	1	6+5	1	1+1	0	0	0
26	MF	(Argentina) ARG	Joaquín Pereyra	10	0	7	0	0	0	3	0
31	MF	(United States) USA	Hassani Dotson	33	5	26+3	5	1	0	3	0
34	MF	(United States) USA	Rory O'Driscoll	1	0	0+1	0	0	0	0	0
38	MF	(United States) USA	Kage Romanshyn Jr.	1	0	0+1	0	0	0	0	0
44	MF	(United States) USA	Moses Nyeman	5	0	1+3	0	0+1	0	0	0
67	MF	(Panama) PAN	Carlos Harvey	23	0	12+6	0	2	0	3	0
Forwards
9	FW	(Italy) ITA	Kelvin Yeboah	12	9	8+1	7	0	0	3	2
11	FW	(South Korea) KOR	Jeong Sang-bin	35	6	25+7	6	0	0	0+3	0
14	FW	(Canada) CAN	Tani Oluwaseyi	30	8	10+15	8	1+1	0	0+3	0
19	FW	(England) ENG	Samuel Shashoua	4	0	0+3	0	0+1	0	0	0
21	FW	(South Africa) RSA	Bongokuhle Hlongwane	37	11	23+9	11	2	0	3	0
22	FW	(Finland) FIN	Teemu Pukki	24	4	11+10	4	1+1	0	0+1	0
29	FW	(Liberia) LBR	Patrick Weah	3	0	0+3	0	0	0	0	0
90	FW	(Togo) TOG	Loïc Mesanvi	6	0	0+3	0	2	0	0+1	0
99	FW	(United States) USA	Jordan Adebayo-Smith	11	0	1+10	0	0	0	0	0
Player(s) transferred out but featured this season
10	MF	(Argentina) ARG	Emanuel Reynoso	1	0	1	0	0	0	0	0
33	MF	(Honduras) HON	Kervin Arriaga	13	3	9+4	3	0	0	0	0
37	MF	(United States) USA	Caden Clark	23	0	11+12	0	0	0	0	0
40	DF	(Sweden) SWE	Victor Eriksson	4	0	2+2	0	0	0	0	0

=== Goalscorers ===
As of November 24th, 2024

Rank	No.	Pos.	Nat.	Name	Major League Soccer	Leagues Cup	Playoffs	Total
1	21	FW	(South Africa)	Bongokuhle Hlongwane	11	0	0	11
2	9	FW	(Italy)	Kelvin Yeboah	7	0	2	9
3	14	FW	(Canada)	Tani Oluwaseyi	8	0	0	8
3	17	MF	(Finland)	Robin Lod	7	1	0	8
5	11	FW	(South Korea)	Jeong Sang-bin	6	0	0	6
6	31	MF	(United States)	Hassani Dotson	5	0	0	5
7	22	FW	(Finland)	Teemu Pukki	4	0	0	4
8	33	MF	(Honduras)	Kervin Arriaga	3	0	0	3
9	25	MF	(Costa Rica)	Alejandro Bran	1	0	0	1
9	7	MF	(Argentina)	Franco Fragapane	1	0	0	1
9	15	DF	(New Zealand)	Michael Boxall	1	0	0	1
9	20	MF	(United States)	Wil Trapp	1	0	0	1
9	8	MF	(Honduras)	Joseph Rosales	0	0	1	1
Own Goals					3	0	0	3
Total					58	1	3	62

=== Assists ===
As of November 24th, 2024

Rank	No.	Pos.	Nat.	Name	Major League Soccer	Leagues Cup	Playoffs	Total
1	17	MF	(Finland)	Robin Lod	15	0	0	15
2	8	MF	(Honduras)	Joseph Rosales	10	0	1	11
3	14	FW	(Canada)	Tani Oluwaseyi	6	0	0	6
4	21	FW	(South Africa)	Bongokuhle Hlongwane	4	0	0	4
4	31	MF	(United States)	Hassani Dotson	4	0	0	4
4	7	MF	(Argentina)	Franco Fragapane	4	0	0	4
7	27	DF	(United States)	DJ Taylor	2	0	0	2
7	15	DF	(New Zealand)	Michael Boxall	2	0	0	2
7	20	MF	(United States)	Wil Trapp	2	0	0	2
7	11	FW	(South Korea)	Jeong Sang-bin	2	0	0	2
7	9	FW	(Italy)	Kelvin Yeboah	1	0	1	2
12	4	DF	(Mexico)	Miguel Tapias	1	0	0	1
12	37	MF	(United States)	Caden Clark	1	0	0	1
12	99	FW	(United States)	Jordan Adebayo-Smith	1	0	0	1
12	67	MF	(Panama)	Carlos Harvey	1	0	0	1
12	33	MF	(Honduras)	Kervin Arriaga	1	0	0	1
12	2	DF	(United States)	Devin Padelford	1	0	0	1
12	26	MF	(Argentina)	Joaquín Pereyra	1	0	0	1
12	28	DF	(Colombia)	Jefferson Díaz	0	0	1	1

=== Disciplinary record ===
As of November 24th, 2024

Rk.	No.	Pos.	Nat.	Name	Major League Soccer			Leagues Cup			Playoffs			Total		
Rk.	No.	Pos.	Nat.	Name	Yellow card	Second yellow card	Red card	Yellow card	Second yellow card	Red card	Yellow card	Second yellow card	Red card	Yellow card	Second yellow card	Red card
1	8	MF	(Honduras)	Joseph Rosales	5	1	1	1	0	0	0	0	0	6	1	1
2	31	MF	(United States)	Hassani Dotson	2	1	0	0	0	1	1	0	0	3	1	1
3	44	MF	(United States)	Moses Nyeman	0	0	1	0	0	0	0	0	0	0	0	1
3	24	DF	(Spain)	Hugo Bacharach	0	0	0	0	0	1	0	0	0	0	0	1
5	28	DF	(Colombia)	Jefferson Díaz	4	0	0	0	0	0	1	1	0	5	1	0
6	4	DF	(Mexico)	Miguel Tapias	4	1	0	0	0	0	0	0	0	4	1	0
7	15	DF	(New Zealand)	Michael Boxall	9	0	0	0	0	0	0	0	0	9	0	0
8	20	MF	(United States)	Wil Trapp	5	0	0	0	0	0	1	0	0	6	0	0
9	2	DF	(United States)	Devin Padelford	4	0	0	0	0	0	0	0	0	4	0	0
9	11	FW	(South Korea)	Jeong Sang-bin	4	0	0	0	0	0	0	0	0	4	0	0
9	14	FW	(Canada)	Tani Oluwaseyi	4	0	0	0	0	0	0	0	0	4	0	0
12	27	DF	(United States)	D.J. Taylor	3	0	0	0	0	0	0	0	0	3	0	0
12	33	MF	(Honduras)	Kervin Arriaga	3	0	0	0	0	0	0	0	0	3	0	0
12	37	MF	(United States)	Caden Clark	3	0	0	0	0	0	0	0	0	3	0	0
12	25	MF	(Costa Rica)	Alejandro Bran	3	0	0	0	0	0	0	0	0	3	0	0
12	9	FW	(Italy)	Kelvin Yeboah	3	0	0	0	0	0	0	0	0	3	0	0
12	97	GK	(Canada)	Dayne St. Clair	2	0	0	1	0	0	0	0	0	3	0	0
12	21	FW	(South Africa)	Bongokuhle Hlongwane	2	0	0	0	0	0	1	0	0	3	0	0
19	99	FW	(United States)	Jordan Adebayo-Smith	2	0	0	0	0	0	0	0	0	2	0	0
19	17	MF	(Finland)	Robin Lod	2	0	0	0	0	0	0	0	0	2	0	0
19	26	MF	(Argentina)	Joaquín Pereyra	2	0	0	0	0	0	0	0	0	2	0	0
19	67	MF	(Panama)	Carlos Harvey	1	0	0	1	0	0	0	0	0	2	0	0
23	7	MF	(Argentina)	Franco Fragapane	1	0	0	0	0	0	0	0	0	1	0	0
Totals					68	3	2	3	0	2	4	1	0	75	4	4

=== Clean sheets ===
As of November 24th, 2024

Rank	No.	Pos.	Nat.	Name	Major League Soccer	Leagues Cup	MLS Cup Playoffs	Total
1	97	GK	(Canada)	Dayne St. Clair	7	1	1	9

== Honors and awards ==
=== Bell Bank Man of the Match ===
Note: Bell Bank Man of the Match is voted on by fans on X near the end of each MLS Match.

Player	Position	Times Won	Most Recent
(Italy) Kelvin Yeboah	FW	6	Nov. 24th at LA Galaxy
(Finland) Robin Lod	MF	6	Oct. 19 vs St. Louis City SC
(South Korea) Jeong Sang-bin	FW	6	Jul. 20 vs San Jose Earthquakes
(South Africa) Bongokuhle Hlongwane	FW	4	Aug. 31 at San Jose Earthquakes
(United States) Hassani Dotson	MF	2	Oct. 5 at Vancouver Whitecaps FC
(Finland) Teemu Pukki	FW	2	Jul. 7 at LA Galaxy
(Canada) Tani Oluwaseyi	FW	2	Jun. 1 vs Sporting Kansas City
(New Zealand) Michael Boxall	DF	2	Apr. 27 vs Sporting Kansas City
(Honduras) Joseph Rosales	MF	1	Nov. 2 vs Real Salt Lake
(Canada) Dayne St. Clair	GK	1	Oct. 29 at Real Salt Lake
(Panama) Carlos Harvey	MF	1	Oct. 2 at Real Salt Lake
(Mexico) Miguel Tapias	DF	1	May 29 at Los Angeles FC
(Honduras) Kervin Arriaga	FW	1	May 15 vs LA Galaxy
(Argentina) Franco Fragapane	MF	1	Apr. 13 vs Houston Dynamo

=== MLS Team of the Matchday ===
Week	Player	Opponent	Position	Ref
1+2	(Finland) Robin Lod	Austin FC	MF	
4	(Finland) Teemu Pukki	Orlando City SC	FW	
5	(Wales) Eric Ramsay	Los Angeles FC	Coach	
5	(United States) Hassani Dotson	Los Angeles FC	Bench	
10	(Finland) Robin Lod	Charlotte FC	MF	
10	(Wales) Eric Ramsay	Charlotte FC	Coach	
10	(United States) Devin Padelford	Charlotte FC	Bench	
11	(Honduras) Joseph Rosales	Sporting Kansas City	DF	
12	(Honduras) Kervin Arriaga	Atlanta United FC	DF	
14	(Honduras) Joseph Rosales	LA Galaxy	Bench	
15	(Finland) Robin Lod	Portland Timbers	MF	
16	(South Korea) Jeong Sang-bin	Colorado Rapids	FW	
18	(Canada) Tani Oluwaseyi	Sporting Kansas City	FW	
18	(Honduras) Kervin Arriaga	Sporting Kansas City	Bench	
28	(Honduras) Joseph Rosales	San Jose Earthquakes	Bench	
29	(Italy) Kelvin Yeboah	Seattle Sounders FC	Bench	
30	(South Africa) Bongokuhle Hlongwane	San Jose Earthquakes	Forward	
32	(Canada) Dayne St. Clair	St. Louis City SC	Bench	
34	(Finland) Robin Lod	Sporting Kansas City	Bench	
36	(Canada) Dayne St. Clair	Real Salt Lake	Bench	

=== MLS All-Stars ===
Player	Position	Ref
(Finland) Robin Lod	MF	
