= Gladness (disambiguation) =

Gladness is a synonym for happiness.

Gladness may also refer to:

- Gladness Stakes, a horse race in Ireland
- Mickell Gladness (born 1986), American professional basketball player

== See also ==
- Glad (disambiguation)
- Gladding
