= 2025 Real Salt Lake season =

American soccer team season

Real Salt Lake
2025 season
- Head coach: Pablo Mastroeni
- Stadium: America First Field
- Major League Soccer: Conference: 9th Overall: 19th
- MLS Cup Playoffs: Wild Card
- Leagues Cup: League phase
- CONCACAF Champions Cup: Round one
- Rocky Mountain Cup: Runners-up
- Average home league attendance: 19,775
| Home colors | Away colors | Third colors |

The 2025 Real Salt Lake season was the team's 21st season in Major League Soccer, the top division of the American soccer pyramid. The team also competed in both the 2025 Leagues Cup and the 2025 CONCACAF Champions Cup, based on standings from the 2024 season. Real Salt Lake played their home games at America First Field in the Salt Lake City suburb of Sandy, and was managed by Pablo Mastroeni in his fourth full season with the club.

== Club ==
=== Roster ===
As of August 22, 2025

Note: Flags indicate national team as defined under FIFA eligibility rules; some limited exceptions apply. Players may hold more than one non-FIFA nationality.

| No. | Pos. | Nation | Player |
|---|---|---|---|
| 1 | GK | BRA | Rafael Cabral |
| 2 | DF | USA | DeAndre Yedlin |
| 3 | DF | TRI | Kobi Henry (on loan from Reims) |
| 4 | DF | COL | Brayan Vera |
| 6 | MF | PAR | Braian Ojeda |
| 7 | MF | ARG | Pablo Ruiz |
| 8 | MF | USA | Diego Luna |
| 9 | FW | NGA | William Agada |
| 10 | FW | POR | Diogo Gonçalves |
| 12 | FW | BRA | Rwan Cruz (on loan from Botafogo) |
| 14 | DF | USA | Emeka Eneli |
| 15 | DF | USA | Justen Glad |
| 16 | FW | USA | Tyler Wolff |
| 17 | FW | NGA | Victor Olatunji |
| 18 | GK | USA | Zac MacMath |
| 19 | FW | USA | Bode Hidalgo |
| 20 | FW | USA | Marcos Zambrano |
| 23 | FW | AUS | Ariath Piol |
| 24 | GK | USA | Max Kerkvliet |
| 25 | FW | JAM | Matthew Bell |

| No. | Pos. | Nation | Player |
|---|---|---|---|
| 26 | DF | USA | Philip Quinton |
| 29 | DF | USA | Sam Junqua |
| 30 | MF | USA | Owen Anderson |
| 31 | GK | USA | Mason Stajduhar |
| 32 | DF | USA | Zackery Farnsworth |
| 33 | DF | USA | Tommy Silva |
| 34 | MF | USA | Luca Moisa |
| 36 | FW | ESP | Jesús Barea |
| 37 | DF | USA | Luis Rivera |
| 39 | MF | USA | Aiden Hezarkhani |
| 40 | MF | USA | Omar Marquez |
| 53 | DF | MEX | Juan Gio Villa |
| 72 | FW | USA | Zavier Gozo |
| 77 | FW | SCO | Johnny Russell |
| 91 | DF | JAM | Javain Brown |
| 92 | MF | GER | Noel Caliskan |
| 98 | DF | GRE | Alexandros Katranis |

=== Transfers ===
As of August 22, 2025

==== In ====
| Player | Position | Previous Club | Fees/Notes | Date | Ref. |
|---|---|---|---|---|---|
| (United States) Tyler Wolff | FW | (United States) Atlanta United FC | $50k 2026 GAM | December 9, 2024 | |
| (Ghana) Forster Ajago | FW | (United States) Nashville SC | Re-Entry Draft | December 13, 2024 | |
| (Brazil) Elias Manoel | FW | (United States) New York Red Bulls | $700k 2025 & 2026 GAM | December 20, 2024 | |
| (United States) Sam Junqua | DF | (United States) FC Dallas | Trade for Anderson Julio + $500k GAM | December 23, 2024 | |
| (United States) Mason Stajduhar | GK | (United States) Orlando City | Up to $200k GAM + 2026 SuperDraft pick | January 15, 2025 | |
| (United States) Owen Anderson | MF | (United States) RSL Academy | Homegrown Player | January 16, 2025 | |
| (United States) Aiden Hezarkhani | MF | (United States) RSL Academy | Homegrown Player | January 16, 2025 | |
| (United States) Omar Marquez | MF | (United States) RSL Academy | Homegrown Player | January 16, 2025 | |
| (United States) Juan Gio Villa | DF | (United States) RSL Academy | Homegrown Player | January 16, 2025 | |
| (Brazil) Rafael Cabral | GK | (Brazil) Cruzeiro | Free agency | January 21, 2025 | |
| (Australia) Ariath Piol | FW | (Australia) Macarthur FC | Undisclosed | January 23, 2025 | |
| (United States) Max Kerkvliet | GK | (United States) UConn Huskies | 2025 MLS SuperDraft | February 17, 2025 | |
| (Spain) Jesús Barea | FW | (United States) Missouri State Bears | 2025 MLS SuperDraft | February 27, 2025 | |
| (Nigeria) William Agada | FW | (United States) Sporting Kansas City | $850,000 GAM + add-on | April 23, 2025 | |
| (Scotland) Johnny Russell | FW | (United States) Sporting Kansas City | Free agency | April 25, 2025 | |
| (United States) Marcos Zambrano | FW | (Portugal) Vitória S.C B | Free agency | July 31, 2025 | |
| (Nigeria) Victor Olatunji | FW | (Czech Republic) Sparta Prague | Undisclosed | August 6, 2025 | |
| (United States) DeAndre Yedlin | DF | (United States) FC Cincinnati | $304,700 GAM | August 21, 2025 | |

==== Out ====
| Player | Position | Next Club | Fees/Notes | Date |
|---|---|---|---|---|
| (United States) Kevin Bonilla | DF | (United States) Real Monarchs | Option Declined | November 27, 2024 |
| (Cuba) Maikel Chang | MF | | Out of Contract | November 27, 2024 |
| (United States) Tomas Gomez | GK | | Out of Contract | November 27, 2024 |
| (United States) Erik Holt | DF | | Option Declined | November 27, 2024 |
| (France) Bertin Jacquesson | FW | (United States) Pittsburgh Riverhounds SC | Option Declined | November 27, 2024 |
| (United States) Benji Michel | FW | (Finland) HJK Helsinki | Option Declined | November 27, 2024 |
| (Mexico) Jaziel Orozco | DF | (United States) St. Louis City 2 | Option Declined | November 27, 2024 |
| (United States) Ilijah Paul | FW | (United States) Monterey Bay FC | Option Declined | November 27, 2024 |
| (Haiti) Delentz Pierre | DF | (United States) FC Tulsa | Option Declined | November 27, 2024 |
| (Guatemala) Rubio Rubin | FW | (United States) Charleston Battery | Option Declined | November 27, 2024 |
| (Uruguay) Marcelo Silva | DF | Retired | | November 27, 2024 |
| (Ecuador) Anderson Julio | FW | (United States) FC Dallas | Trade for Sam Junqua + $500k GAM | December 23, 2024 |
| (England) Matt Crooks | MF | (England) Hull City | Undisclosed | January 10, 2025 |
| (Colombia) Chicho Arango | FW | (United States) San Jose Earthquakes | $1.5m GAM + int'l roster spot | January 11, 2025 |
| (United States) Gavin Beavers | GK | (Denmark) Brøndby IF | Undisclosed | January 22, 2025 |
| (United States) Andrew Brody | DF | (United States) Sporting Kansas City | Waived | February 18, 2025 |
| (Brazil) Elias Manoel | FW | (Brazil) Botafogo | Undisclosed | February 27, 2025 |
| (Australia) Lachlan Brook | FW | (New Zealand) Auckland FC | Contract terminated | July 29, 2025 |
| (Ivory Coast) Axel Kei | FW | | Waived | July 31, 2025 |
| (United States) Bode Hidalgo | DF | (Canada) CF Montreal | Trade for $200k GAM | August 21,2025 |

=== Loans ===
==== In ====
| Player | Position | Loaned From | Fees/Notes | Date |
|---|---|---|---|---|
| (Trinidad and Tobago) Kobi Henry | DF | (France) Reims | Loan for full 2025 season | January 14, 2025 |
| (Brazil) Rwan Cruz | FW | (Brazil) Botafogo | Loan through June 2026 w/ option to extend (Note: Cruz's loan was terminated early on January 26, 2026, prior to the 2026 season.) | August 1, 2025 |

==== Out ====
| Player | Position | Loaned To | Fees/Notes | Date |
|---|---|---|---|---|
| (Jamaica) Kevon Lambert | MF | (United States) Louisville City FC | Loan for full 2025 season | January 23, 2025 |
| (Ghana) Forster Ajago | FW | (United States) Lexington SC | Loan for full 2025 season | April 25, 2025 |
| (Colombia) Nelson Palacio | MF | (Switzerland) FC Zurich | Loan for remainder of 2025 season | July 10, 2025 |
| (Poland) Dominik Marczuk | MF | (United States) FC Cincinnati | Loan for remainder of 2025 season | August 22, 2025 |

== Competitions ==
=== Preseason ===
| January 24 Preseason | Real Salt Lake | 2–2 | New York City FC | Santa Barbara, California |
| 12 pm PDT | Marczuk 38'; Ojeda 60' | Report | Parks 13'; Martínez 14' |

| January 29 Preseason | Real Salt Lake | 1–1 | Minnesota United FC | Santa Barbara, California |
| TBD | Ajago 90' | Report | Pereyra 15' |
Note: Played in two 60-minute halves.

| February 5 Coachella Valley Invitational | St. Louis City SC | 1–1 | Real Salt Lake | Indio, California |
| 11:00 a.m. MDT | Katranis 37' (o.g.) | Report | Brook 70' | Stadium: Empire Polo Club |

| February 8 Coachella Valley Invitational | Real Salt Lake | 3–0 | Las Vegas Lights FC | Indio, California |
| 1:30 p.m. MDT | Caliskan 25'; Gozo 30'; Wolff 49' | Report | | Stadium: Empire Polo Club |

| February 12 Coachella Valley Invitational | New York Red Bulls | 3–3 | Real Salt Lake | Indio, California |
| 1:30 p.m. MDT | Hack 21'; Choupo-Moting 41' (pen.); Sofo 65' | Report | Ajago 9', 81'; Gonçalves 77' | Stadium: Empire Polo Club |

| February 12 Preseason | Orange County SC | 1–3 | Real Salt Lake | Indio, California |
| 4:00 p.m. MDT | | | | Stadium: Empire Polo Club |

=== MLS regular season ===
==== Matches ====
| February 22 1 | San Jose Earthquakes | 4–0 | Real Salt Lake | San Jose, California |
| 8:30 p.m. MST | Ricketts 28'; Rodrigues 70'; Espinoza (yellow card) 73'; Bouda 74'; Harkes (yellow card) 81'; Costa 83'; Kaye (yellow card) 87'; Daniel (yellow card) 90+4' | Report | Katranis (yellow card) 54'; Luna (yellow card) 90+3' | Stadium: PayPal Park; Attendance: 17,432; Referee: Malik Badawi |

| March 1 2 | Real Salt Lake | 2–0 | Seattle Sounders FC | Sandy, Utah |
| 2:30 p.m. MST | Nouhou 8' (o.g.); Brown (yellow card) 56'; Ajago 79', (yellow card) 90+4' | Report | Nouhou (yellow card) 25' | Stadium: America First Field; Attendance: 18,853; Referee: Ricardo Fierro |

| March 8 3 | Real Salt Lake | 1–3 | San Diego FC | Sandy, Utah |
| 7:30 p.m. MST | Piol 17'; Ojeda (yellow card) 69'; Cabral (yellow card) 76'; Glad (yellow card) 79' | Report | Negri 43'; Tverskov (yellow card) 77'; Dreyer 90+1'; Ingvartsen 90+6' | Stadium: America First Field; Attendance: 19,337; Referee: Alexis Da Silva |

| March 15 4 | Houston Dynamo FC | 1–2 | Real Salt Lake | Houston, Texas |
| 6:30 p.m. MDT | Ponce 16', (yellow card) 90+2'; Escobar (yellow card) 45+5'; Bartlow (yellow card) 58' | Report | Gonçalves 1'; Luna 45+5'; Hidalgo (yellow card) 45+8' | Stadium: Shell Energy Stadium; Attendance: 15,263; Referee: Marcos de Oliveira |

| March 22 5 | Real Salt Lake | 0–1 | FC Dallas | Sandy, Utah |
| 7:30 p.m. MDT | Piol (red card) 23'; Ruiz (yellow card) 25'; Ajago (yellow card) 68'; Vera (yellow card) 74'; Quinton (yellow card) 75' | Report | Musa (yellow card) 27'; Acosta 45+7', (yellow card) 90+6'; Farrington (yellow card) 74'; Ramiro (yellow card) 88'; Ibeagha (yellow card) 90+3' | Stadium: America First Field; Attendance: 19,650; Referee: Sergii Boiko |

| March 29 6 | Minnesota United FC | 2–0 | Real Salt Lake | Saint Paul, Minnesota |
| 6:30 p.m. MDT | Oluwaseyi 30', 55'; Pereyra (yellow card) 32'; St. Clair (yellow card) 80' | Report | Brook (yellow card) 82'; Ruiz (yellow card) 90+3' | Stadium: Allianz Field; Attendance: 17,124; Referee: Victor Rivas |

| April 5 7 | Real Salt Lake | 2–0 | LA Galaxy | Sandy, Utah |
| 3:30 p.m. MDT | Vera (yellow card) 3'; Luna 21', 26'; Katranis (yellow card) 70'; Marczuk (yellow card) 74' | Report | Lepley (yellow card) 72'; Jørgensen (yellow card) 89' | Stadium: America First Field; Attendance: 19,304; Referee: Guido Gonzales Jr. |

| April 12 8 | Nashville SC | 2–1 | Real Salt Lake | Nashville, Tennessee |
| 6:30 p.m. MDT | Mukhtar (yellow card) 22'; Lovitz (yellow card) 26', (goal) 30'; Brugman (yellow card) 47'; Tagseth (yellow card) 61'; Surridge 90+1' (pen.) | Report | Marczuk 12'; Gonçalves (yellow card) 51'; Glad (yellow card) 64'; Ojeda (yellow card) 64' | Stadium: Geodis Park; Attendance: 25,625; Referee: Jair Marrufo |

| April 19 9 | Real Salt Lake | 0–1 | Toronto FC | Sandy, Utah |
| 7:30 p.m. MDT | Luna (red card) 61'; Eneli (yellow card) 67'; Glad (yellow card) 90+5' | Report | Corbeanu 9'; Flores (yellow card) 12'; Bernardeschi (yellow card) 36'; Petretta (yellow card) 62'; Johnson (yellow card) 73'; Thompson (yellow card) 84' | Stadium: America First Field; Attendance: 19,802; Referee: Sergii Demianchuk |
Note: Following the match, the Independent Review Panel would rescind the red card given to Luna.

| April 26 10 | San Diego FC | 1–3 | Real Salt Lake | San Diego, California |
| 5:30 p.m. MDT | Lozano 45+6' (pen.), (yellow card) 73'; Bombino (yellow card) 56'; Alvarado Jr. (yellow card) 87' | Report | Katranis (yellow card) 45+1'; Luna 45+1', 54' (pen.); Junqua 66'; Quinton (yellow card) 83'; Gonçalves (yellow card) 86'; Hidalgo (yellow card) 90+3' (yellow-red card) 90+6' | Stadium: Snapdragon Stadium; Attendance: 28,116; Referee: Ricardo Fierro |

| May 3 11 | Vancouver Whitecaps FC | 2–1 | Real Salt Lake | Vancouver, British Columbia |
| 8:30 p.m. MDT | Nelson 20'; Ríos (yellow card) 64'; Blackmon 70' | Report | Ojeda (yellow card) 22'; Glad (yellow card) 51'; Luna (yellow card) 62', (goal) 90+6' (pen.) | Stadium: BC Place; Attendance: 19,762; Referee: Malik Badawi |

| May 10 12 | FC Dallas | 1–1 | Real Salt Lake | Frisco, Texas |
| 6:30 p.m. MDT | Show (yellow card) 5'; Julio 53'; Kaick (yellow card) 76' | Report | Glad (yellow card) 11'; Luna (yellow card) 15', (goal) 24'; Eneli (yellow card) 39'; Katranis (yellow card) 45+7'; Agada (yellow card) 51' (yellow-red card) 58' | Stadium: Toyota Stadium; Attendance: 11,004; Referee: Rosendo Mendoza |

| May 14 13 | Real Salt Lake | 0–0 | Portland Timbers | Sandy, Utah |
| 7:30 p.m. MDT | Hidalgo (yellow card) 21'; Caliskan (yellow card) 62'; Luna (yellow card) 69' | Report | Paredes (yellow card) 46' | Stadium: America First Field; Attendance: 19,616; Referee: Drew Fischer |

| May 17 14 (RMC) | Colorado Rapids | 1–0 | Real Salt Lake | Commerce City, Colorado |
| 7:30 p.m. MDT | Atencio (yellow card) 29'; Mihailovic 70'; Yapi (yellow card) 80'; Cannon (yellow card) 90+6' | Report | Ojeda (yellow card) 31' | Stadium: Dick's Sporting Goods Park; Attendance: 15,846; Referee: Pierre-Luc Lauziere |

| May 24 15 | Real Salt Lake | 2–3 | Vancouver Whitecaps FC | Sandy, Utah |
| 7:30 p.m. MDT | Gozo 1'; Luna 4'; Agada (yellow card) 45+4'; Caliskan (yellow card) 59'; Marczuk (yellow card) 62'; Katranis (yellow card) 65'; Eneli (yellow card) 90+4' | Report | White 20', 25' (pen.); Ahmed (yellow card) 77'; Priso (yellow card) 83'; Vite 90' | Stadium: America First Field; Attendance: 20,034; Referee: Filip Dujic |

| May 28 16 | Austin FC | 1–1 | Real Salt Lake | Austin, Texas |
| 6:30 p.m. MDT | Sánchez (yellow card) 67'; Rubio 90+3'; Šabović (yellow card) 90+5' | Report | Agada 67'; Gozo (yellow card) 74' | Stadium: Q2 Stadium; Attendance: 20,738; Referee: Lukasz Szpala |

| May 31 17 | LA Galaxy | 2–0 | Real Salt Lake | Carson, California |
| 8:30 p.m. MDT | Sanabria 17'; Parente (yellow card) 54'; Paintsil 55'; Cerrillo (yellow card) 90+2' | Report | Vera (yellow card) 75' | Stadium: Dignity Health Sports Park; Attendance: 23,210; Referee: Rubiel Vazquez |

| June 14 18 | Real Salt Lake | 2–0 | D.C. United | Sandy, Utah |
| 7:30 p.m. MDT | Russell 23'; Agada (yellow card) 48'; Katranis (yellow card) 62'; Vera (yellow card) 73'; Gozo 77' | Report | Badji (yellow card) 62' | Stadium: America First Field; Attendance: 20,002; Referee: Jon Freemon |

| June 28 20 | Sporting Kansas City | 1–1 | Real Salt Lake | Kansas City, Kansas |
| 6:30 p.m. MDT | Sallói (yellow card) 24'; Leibold (yellow card) 35'; Bartlett (yellow card) 43'; Rodríguez (yellow card) 49'; Thommy 59'; Davis (yellow card) 69' (yellow-red card) 82' | Report | Russell 45+1'; Palacio (yellow card) 52'; Ruiz (yellow card) 74' | Stadium: Children's Mercy Park; Attendance: 17,050; Referee: Ismir Pekmic |

| July 5 21 | Real Salt Lake | 3–2 | St. Louis City SC | Sandy, Utah |
| 7:30 p.m. MDT | Caliskan 6'; Russell (yellow card) 32'; Gonçalves 43'; Yaro 64' (o.g.) | Report | Wallem (yellow card) 17'; Klauss 51'; Yaro 81' | Stadium: America First Field; Attendance: 20,036; Referee: Allen Chapman |

| July 12 22 | Real Salt Lake | 1–0 | Houston Dynamo FC | Sandy, Utah |
| 7:30 p.m. MDT | Agada 42', (yellow card) 72'; Ojeda (yellow card) 57'; Caliskan (yellow card) 68' | Report | Andrade (yellow card) 35'; Artur (yellow card) 40' | Stadium: America First Field; Attendance: 19,678; Referee: Chris Penso |

| July 16 23 | Portland Timbers | 0−1 | Real Salt Lake | Portland, Oregon |
| 8:30 p.m. MDT | Mora (yellow card) 69' | Report | Vera (yellow card) 45'; Ruiz (yellow card) 52'; Hidalgo (yellow card) 67'; Gonçalves 83'; Cabral (yellow card) 90+8' | Stadium: Providence Park; Attendance: 21,772; Referee: Alexis Da Silva |

| July 19 24 | Real Salt Lake | 0−1 | FC Cincinnati | Sandy, Utah |
| 7:30 p.m. MDT | Katranis (yellow card) 31'; Vera (yellow card) 39' | Report | Baird (yellow card) 16'; Hadebe (yellow card) 27'; Flores (yellow card) 42'; Yedlin (yellow card) 73'; Orellano 87' | Stadium: America First Field; Attendance: 19,836; Referee: Lorenzo Hernandez |

| July 26 25 | Real Salt Lake | 2–1 | San Jose Earthquakes | Sandy, Utah |
| 7:30 p.m. MDT | Caliskan (yellow card) 9'; Gozo (yellow card) 24'; Luna (yellow card) 42'; Ricketts 57' (o.g.); Ojeda 81'; Marczuk (yellow card) 83'; Cabral (yellow card) 90' | Report | Harkes (yellow card) 33'; Wilson (yellow card) 42'; Roberts (yellow card) 45+5' (yellow-red card) 83'; Martínez 51'; Floriani (yellow card) 54' | Stadium: America First Field; Attendance: 19,238; Referee: Pierre-Luc Lauziere |

| August 10 26 | New York Red Bulls | 2–1 | Real Salt Lake | Harrison, New Jersey |
| 4:00 p.m. MDT | Hack (yellow card) 14'; Choupo-Moting 52', 90+9' (pen.); Donkor (yellow card) 59'; Nealis (yellow card) 77'; Duncan (red card) 90' | Report | Gozo 3', (yellow card) 77'; Luna (yellow card) 82' (yellow-red card) 85' | Stadium: Sports Illustrated Stadium; Attendance: 18,087; Referee: Ricardo Fierro |

| August 16 27 | Charlotte FC | 1–0 | Real Salt Lake | Charlotte, North Carolina |
| 5:30 p.m. MDT | Zaha (yellow card) 3'; Toklomati 35' | Report | Glad (yellow card) 33'; Gozo (yellow card) 38'; Vera (yellow card) 70'; Agada (yellow card) 87' | Stadium: Bank of America Stadium; Attendance: 28,201; Referee: Tori Penso |

| August 23 28 | Real Salt Lake | 1–3 | Minnesota United FC | Sandy, Utah |
| 7:30 p.m. MDT | Olatunji 15'; Cruz (yellow card) 52'; Yedlin (yellow card) 75' | Report | Vera 6' (o.g.); Lod 36'; Pereyra 51'; Romero (yellow card) 58'; St. Clair (yellow card) 74' | Stadium: America First Field; Attendance: 20,137; Referee: Joe Dickerson |

| September 13 30 | Real Salt Lake | 2–1 | Sporting Kansas City | Sandy, Utah |
| 7:30 p.m. MDT | Luna 40'; Cruz (yellow card) 59'; Katranis 62' | Report | Vera 71' (o.g.); Joveljić (yellow card) 90+4' | Stadium: America First Field; Attendance: 20,172; Referee: Drew Fischer |

| September 17 19 | Real Salt Lake | 1–4 | Los Angeles FC | Sandy, Utah |
| 7:30 p.m. MDT | Cruz (yellow card) 37'; Katranis (yellow card) 62'; Gozo 76'; Olatunji (red card); Wolff (yellow card) 90+6' | Report | Son Heung-Min 3', 16', 82'; Moran (yellow card) 74'; Bouanga 88' | Stadium: America First Field; Attendance: 19,778; Referee: Armando Villarreal |
Note: Match moved from June 25 due to Los Angeles FC's participation in the 2025 FIFA Club World Cup.

| September 21 31 | Los Angeles FC | 4–1 | Real Salt Lake | Los Angeles, California |
| 7:00 p.m. MDT | Tillman (yellow card) 20'; Bouanga 45+1', 73', 87'; Son Heung-Min 45+3' | Report | Vera 14'; Yedlin (yellow card) 16' | Stadium: BMO Stadium; Attendance: 22,901; Referee: Alexis Da Silva |

| September 27 32 | Real Salt Lake | 3–1 | Austin FC | Sandy, Utah |
| 7:30 p.m. MDT | Ojeda 45'; Katranis (yellow card) 45+2'; Yedlin 49'; Olatunji (yellow card) 71', (goal) 82' | Report | Wolff (yellow card) 74'; Biro (yellow card) 89'; Šabović 90+2' | Stadium: America First Field; Attendance: 20,322; Referee: Rubiel Vazquez |

| October 4 33 (RMC) | Real Salt Lake | 1–0 | Colorado Rapids | Sandy, Utah |
| 7:30 p.m. MDT | Gonçalves 39'; Ojeda (yellow card) 90+3' | Report | | Stadium: America First Field; Attendance: 20,338; Referee: Chris Penso |

| October 11 29 | Seattle Sounders FC | 1–0 | Real Salt Lake | Seattle, Washington |
| 7:30 p.m. MDT | Rothrock 4'; Musovski (yellow card) 88' | Report | Vera (yellow card) 13'; Cruz (yellow card) 30'; Glad (yellow card) 55'; Katranis (yellow card) 71' | Stadium: Lumen Field; Attendance: 31,587; Referee: Ricardo Montero |
Note: Match moved from August 30 due to Seattle Sounders FC's participation in the semifinals of the 2025 Leagues Cup.

| October 18 34 | St. Louis City SC | 2–2 | Real Salt Lake | St. Louis, Missouri |
| 7:00 p.m. MDT | Durkin (yellow card) 21'; Löwen 42' (pen.); Fall (yellow card) 79'; Klauss 88'; Ostrák (yellow card) 90+7' | Report | Olatunji 17', 32'; Luna (yellow card) 24'; Glad (yellow card) 74'; Yedlin (yellow card) 85' | Stadium: Energizer Park; Referee: Armando Villarreal |

==== Standings ====
===== Western Conference table =====
MLS Western Conference table (2025)
| Pos | Team | Pld | W | L | T | GF | GA | GD | Pts | Qualification |
|---|---|---|---|---|---|---|---|---|---|---|
| 1 | San Diego FC | 34 | 19 | 9 | 6 | 64 | 41 | +23 | 63 | Qualification for round one and the CONCACAF Champions Cup round one |
| 2 | Vancouver Whitecaps FC (C) | 34 | 18 | 7 | 9 | 66 | 38 | +28 | 63 | Qualification for round one |
| 3 | Los Angeles FC | 34 | 17 | 8 | 9 | 65 | 40 | +25 | 60 | Qualification for round one |
| 4 | Minnesota United FC | 34 | 16 | 8 | 10 | 56 | 39 | +17 | 58 | Qualification for round one |
| 5 | Seattle Sounders FC | 34 | 15 | 9 | 10 | 58 | 48 | +10 | 55 | Qualification for round one |
| 6 | Austin FC | 34 | 13 | 13 | 8 | 37 | 45 | −8 | 47 | Qualification for round one |
| 7 | FC Dallas | 34 | 11 | 12 | 11 | 52 | 55 | −3 | 44 | Qualification for round one |
| 8 | Portland Timbers | 34 | 11 | 12 | 11 | 41 | 48 | −7 | 44 | Qualification for the wild-card round |
| 9 | Real Salt Lake | 34 | 12 | 17 | 5 | 38 | 49 | −11 | 41 | Qualification for the wild-card round |
| 10 | San Jose Earthquakes | 34 | 11 | 15 | 8 | 60 | 63 | −3 | 41 | |
| 11 | Colorado Rapids | 34 | 11 | 15 | 8 | 44 | 56 | −12 | 41 | |
| 12 | Houston Dynamo FC | 34 | 9 | 15 | 10 | 43 | 56 | −13 | 37 | |
| 13 | St. Louis City SC | 34 | 8 | 18 | 8 | 44 | 58 | −14 | 32 | |
| 14 | LA Galaxy | 34 | 7 | 18 | 9 | 46 | 66 | −20 | 30 | |
| 15 | Sporting Kansas City | 34 | 7 | 20 | 7 | 46 | 70 | −24 | 28 | |

Source: MLS
Rules for classification: 1) points; 2) total wins; 3) total goal differential; 4) total goals scored; 5) fewer disciplinary points; 6) away goal differential; 7) away goals scored; 8) home goals differential; 9) home goals scored; 10) coin toss (2 clubs tied) or drawing of lots (≥3 clubs tied)
(C) Conference champion

===== Overall table =====
Overall MLS standings table (2025)
| Pos | Team | Pld | W | L | T | GF | GA | GD | Pts |
|---|---|---|---|---|---|---|---|---|---|
| 17 | Portland Timbers | 34 | 11 | 12 | 11 | 41 | 48 | −7 | 44 |
| 18 | New York Red Bulls | 34 | 12 | 15 | 7 | 48 | 47 | +1 | 43 |
| 19 | Real Salt Lake | 34 | 12 | 17 | 5 | 38 | 49 | −11 | 41 |
| 20 | San Jose Earthquakes | 34 | 11 | 15 | 8 | 60 | 63 | −3 | 41 |
| 21 | Colorado Rapids | 34 | 11 | 15 | 8 | 44 | 56 | −12 | 41 |

Source: MLS
Rules for classification: 1) points; 2) total wins; 3) total goal differential; 4) total goals scored; 5) fewer disciplinary points; 6) away goal differential; 7) away goals scored; 8) home goals differential; 9) home goals scored; 10) coin toss (2 clubs tied) or drawing of lots (≥3 clubs tied)

=== MLS Cup Playoffs ===
==== Wild Card ====
| October 22 Wild Card | Portland Timbers | 3–1 | Real Salt Lake | Portland, Oregon |
| 8:30 p.m. MDT | Mora 24', 35'; K. Miller 82' | Report | Caliskan (yellow card) 23'; Glad 39'; Vera (yellow card) 74'; Yedlin (yellow card) 79'; Luna (yellow card) 84'; Katranis (yellow card) 88' | Stadium: Providence Park; Attendance: 16,243; Referee: Guido Gonzales Jr. |

=== U.S. Open Cup ===
Due to their participation in the 2025 CONCACAF Champions Cup and 2025 Leagues Cup, Real Salt Lake did not send their senior squad to the 2025 U.S. Open Cup. RSL's reserve team, Real Monarchs, instead competed in the competition, where they exited in the first round.

=== Leagues Cup ===
==== League stage ====
| Pos | Team | Pld | W | PW | PL | L | GF | GA | GD | Pts |
|---|---|---|---|---|---|---|---|---|---|---|
| 5 | Portland Timbers | 3 | 2 | 0 | 1 | 0 | 6 | 1 | +5 | 7 |
| 6 | Columbus Crew | 3 | 2 | 0 | 1 | 0 | 6 | 3 | +3 | 7 |
| 7 | Real Salt Lake | 3 | 1 | 1 | 1 | 0 | 5 | 4 | +1 | 6 |
| 8 | Los Angeles FC | 3 | 1 | 1 | 1 | 0 | 4 | 3 | +1 | 6 |
| 9 | New York Red Bulls | 3 | 1 | 1 | 1 | 0 | 3 | 2 | +1 | 6 |

Source: Leagues Cup

| July 30 Group Stage | América (Mexico) | 2–2 (1–3 p) | (United States) Real Salt Lake | Sandy, Utah |
| 7:30 p.m. MDT | Reyes (yellow card) 35'; Rodríguez 42'; Lichnovsky (yellow card) 45'; Sánchez (yellow card) 90+4', (goal) 90+7' | Report | Luna 16', (yellow card) 42'; Agada 45+2' | Stadium: America First Field; Attendance: 19,544; Referee: Saíd Martínez |
| | Penalties |
| | Martín (penalty missed); Fidalgo (penalty scored); Reyes (penalty missed); Zúñiga (penalty missed) | | (penalty scored) Ruiz; (penalty scored) Glad; (penalty scored) Vera; (penalty missed) Ojeda |

| August 2 Group Stage | Real Salt Lake (United States) | 2–2 (1–4 p) | (Mexico) Atlético San Luis | Sandy, Utah |
| 7:30 p.m. MDT | Ojeda 9', 88' | Report | Pedro 24'; García 82', (yellow card) 90+4'; Dourado (yellow card) 90+1' | Stadium: America First Field; Attendance: 16,637; Referee: Nelson Salgado |
| | Penalties |
| | Vera (penalty missed); Glad (penalty missed); Russell (penalty scored) | | (penalty scored) Pedro; (penalty scored) Galdames; (penalty scored) García; (penalty scored) Cruz |

| August 6 Group Stage | Real Salt Lake (United States) | 1–0 | (Mexico) Querétaro | Sandy, Utah |
| 7:30 p.m. MDT | Ojeda 32'; Agada (yellow card) 45+4'; Ruiz (yellow card) 90+5' | Report | Venegas (yellow card) 41'; Robles (yellow card) 44'; Ávila (yellow card) 89' | Stadium: America First Field; Attendance: 16,164; Referee: Drew Fischer |

=== CONCACAF Champions Cup ===
==== Round One ====
| February 19 Round One; 1st Leg | Herediano (Costa Rica) | 0–0 | (United States) Real Salt Lake | San José, Costa Rica |
| 4:30 p.m. MST | Montes (yellow card) 37'; Gutiérrez (yellow card) 54'; Pérez (yellow card) 90+3' | Report | | Stadium: Estadio Nacional; Attendance: 3,062; Referee: Saíd Martínez |

| February 26 Round One; 2nd Leg | Real Salt Lake (United States) | 1–2 (1–2 agg.) | (Costa Rica) Herediano | Sandy, Utah, United States |
| 5:30 p.m. MDT | Ajago 26'; Vera (yellow card) 73'; Cabral (yellow card) 90+8' | Report | Aguilar 70'; Rodríguez (yellow card) 86'; Vega 90+9' (pen.), (yellow card) 90+10' | Stadium: America First Field; Referee: Fernando Hernández (Mexico) |
Note: Herediano won 2–1 on aggregate.

== Statistics ==
=== Squad appearances ===
As of October 23, 2025

| No | Pos | Nat | Player | Total | | MLS Regular Season | | Leagues Cup | | CONCACAF Champions Cup | | MLS Cup Playoffs | |
| No | Pos | Nat | Player | Apps | Starts | Apps | Starts | Apps | Starts | Apps | Starts | Apps | Starts |
Goalkeepers
| 1 | GK | (Brazil) | Rafael Cabral | 40 | 40 | 34 | 34 | 3 | 3 | 2 | 2 | 1 | 1 |
| 18 | GK | (United States) | Zac MacMath | 0 | 0 | 0 | 0 | 0 | 0 | 0 | 0 | 0 | 0 |
| 24 | GK | (United States) | Max Kerkvliet | 0 | 0 | 0 | 0 | 0 | 0 | 0 | 0 | 0 | 0 |
| 31 | GK | (United States) | Mason Stajduhar | 0 | 0 | 0 | 0 | 0 | 0 | 0 | 0 | 0 | 0 |
Defenders
| 2 | DF | (United States) | DeAndre Yedlin | 8 | 8 | 7 | 7 | 0 | 0 | 0 | 0 | 1 | 1 |
| 3 | DF | (Trinidad and Tobago) | Kobi Henry | 5 | 2 | 3 | 0 | 0 | 0 | 2 | 2 | 0 | 0 |
| 4 | DF | (Colombia) | Brayan Vera | 33 | 28 | 27 | 23 | 3 | 2 | 2 | 2 | 1 | 1 |
| 15 | DF | (United States) | Justen Glad | 35 | 34 | 31 | 31 | 2 | 2 | 1 | 0 | 1 | 1 |
| 26 | DF | (United States) | Philip Quinton | 18 | 11 | 16 | 9 | 2 | 2 | 0 | 0 | 0 | 0 |
| 29 | DF | (United States) | Sam Junqua | 36 | 20 | 32 | 17 | 2 | 2 | 2 | 1 | 0 | 0 |
| 32 | DF | (United States) | Zack Farnsworth | 0 | 0 | 0 | 0 | 0 | 0 | 0 | 0 | 0 | 0 |
| 33 | DF | (United States) | Tommy Silva | 0 | 0 | 0 | 0 | 0 | 0 | 0 | 0 | 0 | 0 |
| 37 | DF | (United States) | Luis Rivera | 0 | 0 | 0 | 0 | 0 | 0 | 0 | 0 | 0 | 0 |
| 41 | DF | (United States) | Juan Gio Villa | 0 | 0 | 0 | 0 | 0 | 0 | 0 | 0 | 0 | 0 |
| 91 | DF | (Jamaica) | Javain Brown | 3 | 3 | 3 | 3 | 0 | 0 | 0 | 0 | 0 | 0 |
| 98 | DF | (Greece) | Alexandros Katranis | 33 | 26 | 29 | 23 | 2 | 1 | 1 | 1 | 1 | 1 |
Midfielders
| 6 | MF | (Paraguay) | Braian Ojeda | 36 | 29 | 30 | 25 | 3 | 2 | 2 | 1 | 1 | 1 |
| 7 | MF | (Argentina) | Pablo Ruíz | 26 | 16 | 21 | 14 | 3 | 2 | 2 | 0 | 0 | 0 |
| 8 | MF | (United States) | Diego Luna | 32 | 30 | 27 | 27 | 3 | 2 | 1 | 0 | 1 | 1 |
| 14 | MF | (United States) | Emeka Eneli | 34 | 23 | 28 | 19 | 3 | 2 | 2 | 2 | 1 | 0 |
| 30 | MF | (United States) | Owen Anderson | 0 | 0 | 0 | 0 | 0 | 0 | 0 | 0 | 0 | 0 |
| 34 | MF | (United States) | Luca Moisa | 0 | 0 | 0 | 0 | 0 | 0 | 0 | 0 | 0 | 0 |
| 38 | MF | (United States) | Jude Wellings | 0 | 0 | 0 | 0 | 0 | 0 | 0 | 0 | 0 | 0 |
| 39 | MF | (United States) | Aiden Herzarkhani | 2 | 0 | 2 | 0 | 0 | 0 | 0 | 0 | 0 | 0 |
| 40 | MF | (United States) | Omar Marquez | 0 | 0 | 0 | 0 | 0 | 0 | 0 | 0 | 0 | 0 |
| 92 | MF | (Germany) | Noel Caliskan | 27 | 24 | 25 | 22 | 1 | 1 | 0 | 0 | 1 | 1 |
Forwards
| 9 | FW | (Nigeria) | William Agada | 26 | 15 | 22 | 12 | 3 | 3 | 0 | 0 | 1 | 0 |
| 10 | FW | (Portugal) | Diogo Goncalves | 35 | 31 | 29 | 26 | 3 | 2 | 2 | 2 | 1 | 1 |
| 12 | FW | (Brazil) | Rwan Cruz | 12 | 8 | 10 | 8 | 1 | 0 | 0 | 0 | 1 | 0 |
| 16 | FW | (United States) | Tyler Wolff | 15 | 2 | 13 | 2 | 0 | 0 | 2 | 0 | 0 | 0 |
| 17 | FW | (Nigeria) | Victor Olatunji | 9 | 8 | 8 | 7 | 0 | 0 | 0 | 0 | 1 | 1 |
| 20 | FW | (United States) | Marcos Zambrano | 0 | 0 | 0 | 0 | 0 | 0 | 0 | 0 | 0 | 0 |
| 23 | FW | (Australia) | Ariath Piol | 27 | 13 | 24 | 12 | 3 | 1 | 0 | 0 | 0 | 0 |
| 25 | FW | (Jamaica) | Matthew Bell | 0 | 0 | 0 | 0 | 0 | 0 | 0 | 0 | 0 | 0 |
| 36 | FW | (Spain) | Jesús Barea | 12 | 1 | 11 | 1 | 0 | 0 | 0 | 0 | 1 | 0 |
| 72 | FW | (United States) | Zavier Gozo | 31 | 24 | 25 | 21 | 3 | 2 | 2 | 0 | 1 | 1 |
| 77 | FW | (Scotland) | Johnny Russell | 14 | 4 | 12 | 4 | 1 | 0 | 0 | 0 | 1 | 0 |
Other players (Departed during season, short-term loan, etc.)
| | MF | (Poland) | Dominik Marczuk | 21 | 14 | 17 | 10 | 2 | 2 | 2 | 2 | 0 | 0 |
| | MF | (Colombia) | Nelson Palacio | 11 | 7 | 10 | 6 | 0 | 0 | 1 | 1 | 0 | 0 |
| | FW | (Australia) | Lachlan Brook | 7 | 2 | 5 | 0 | 0 | 0 | 2 | 2 | 0 | 0 |
| | FW | (United States) | Bode Hidalgo | 23 | 12 | 18 | 8 | 3 | 2 | 2 | 2 | 0 | 0 |
| | FW | (Ivory Coast) | Axel Kei | 0 | 0 | 0 | 0 | 0 | 0 | 0 | 0 | 0 | 0 |
| | FW | (Ghana) | Forster Ajago | 8 | 5 | 6 | 3 | 0 | 0 | 2 | 2 | 0 | 0 |
| | MF | (Jamaica) | Kevon Lambert | 0 | 0 | 0 | 0 | 0 | 0 | 0 | 0 | 0 | 0 |

=== Goals ===
As of October 23, 2025

Goals
| Rank | Player | Nation | Total | MLS Regular Season | Leagues Cup | CONCACAF Champions Cup | MLS Cup Playoffs |
|---|---|---|---|---|---|---|---|
| 1 | Diego Luna | (United States) | 10 | 9 | 1 | | |
| 2 | Braian Ojeda | (Paraguay) | 5 | 2 | 3 | | |
| 3 | Diogo Gonçalves | (Portugal) | 4 | 4 | | | |
| 3 | Zavier Gozo | (United States) | 4 | 4 | | | |
| 3 | Victor Olatunji | (Nigeria) | 4 | 4 | | | |
| 6 | William Agada | (Nigeria) | 3 | 2 | 1 | | |
| 7 | Forster Ajago | (Ghana) | 2 | 1 | | 1 | |
| 7 | Johnny Russell | (Scotland) | 2 | 2 | | | |
| 9 | Noel Caliskan | (Germany) | 1 | 1 | | | |
| 9 | Justen Glad | (United States) | 1 | | | | 1 |
| 9 | Sam Junqua | (United States) | 1 | 1 | | | |
| 9 | Alexandros Katranis | (Greece) | 1 | 1 | | | |
| 9 | Dominik Marczuk | (Poland) | 1 | 1 | | | |
| 9 | Ariath Piol | (Australia) | 1 | 1 | | | |
| 9 | Brayan Vera | (Colombia) | 1 | 1 | | | |
| 9 | DeAndre Yedlin | (United States) | 1 | 1 | | | |

=== Assists ===
As of October 23, 2025

Assists
| Rank | Player | Nation | Total | MLS Regular Season | Leagues Cup | CONCACAF Champions Cup | MLS Cup Playoffs |
|---|---|---|---|---|---|---|---|
| 1 | Diogo Gonçalves | (Portugal) | 7 | 5 | | 1 | 1 |
| 1 | Diego Luna | (United States) | 7 | 7 | | | |
| 3 | Alexandros Katranis | (Greece) | 6 | 5 | 1 | | |
| 4 | Zavier Gozo | (United States) | 3 | 3 | | | |
| 4 | Dominik Marczuk | (Poland) | 3 | 2 | | 1 | |
| 6 | William Agada | (Nigeria) | 2 | 2 | | | |
| 6 | Noel Caliskan | (Germany) | 2 | 1 | 1 | | |
| 6 | Justen Glad | (United States) | 2 | 2 | | | |
| 6 | Sam Junqua | (United States) | 2 | 1 | 1 | | |
| 6 | Ariath Piol | (Australia) | 2 | 2 | | | |
| 6 | Pablo Ruiz | (Argentina) | 2 | 1 | 1 | | |
| 12 | Rwan Cruz | (Brazil) | 1 | 1 | | | |
| 12 | Emeka Eneli | (United States) | 1 | 1 | | | |
| 12 | Braian Ojeda | (Paraguay) | 1 | 1 | | | |
| 12 | Victor Olatunji | (Nigeria) | 1 | 1 | | | |
| 12 | Brayan Vera | (Colombia) | 1 | 1 | | | |

=== Clean Sheets ===
As of October 23, 2025

Shutouts
| Rank | Player | Nation | Total | MLS Regular Season | Leagues Cup | CONCACAF Champions Cup | MLS Cup Playoffs |
|---|---|---|---|---|---|---|---|
| 1 | Rafael Cabral | (Brazil) | 9 | 7 | 1 | 1 | |
