= Gladding =

Gladding is a surname and may refer to:

- Charles Gladding (1828–1894), American co-founder of Gladding, McBean ceramics company
- Fred Gladding (1936 – 2015), American baseball player
- Jody Gladding, American translator and poet
- Monique Gladding (b. 1981), South African-born British diver
- Gary Gladding, American physicist

== See also ==
- James N. Gladding House
- Gladding-Hearn Shipbuilding
- Gladding, McBean
- Gladwin
