= Glad =

Glad may refer to:

- Gladness, or happiness

== Folklore and mythology ==
- Glaðr, a horse in Norse mythology

== People ==
- Emil Glad (1929–2009), Croatian actor
- Ingrid Kristine Glad (born 1965), Norwegian statistician
- John Glad (1941–2015), an American academic, professor of Russian studies
- Justen Glad (born 1997), American soccer player
- Karl Glad (born 1937), Norwegian jurist and industrialist
- Thoralf Glad (1878–1969), Norwegian sailor who competed in the 1912 Summer Olympics
- Glad (duke), ruler in the territory of Banat, who was defeated by the Magyars during the 10th century

== Organizations ==
- Glad (company), an American brand of household plastic bags, wrap, and containers
- GLAD, GLBTQ Legal Advocates & Defenders, a non-profit legal rights organization
- GLAAD, the Gay and Lesbian Alliance Against Defamation

== Music ==
- Glad (band), American Christian pop/rock and a cappella band founded in 1972
- "G.L.A.D", a song by Kim Appleby
- "Glad", a song by Ron Contour and Factor Chandelier from the 2010 album Saffron
- "Glad", a song by Traffic from the 1970 album John Barleycorn Must Die
- Glad, a 1988 alternative rock album by Miracle Legion

== See also ==
- The Gladstone Arms, London, England, known as "The Glad"
- "I'm Glad", a song by Jennifer Lopez
- I was glad, introit commonly used in the Anglican church
