= Brayan Vera =

Colombian footballer (born 1999)

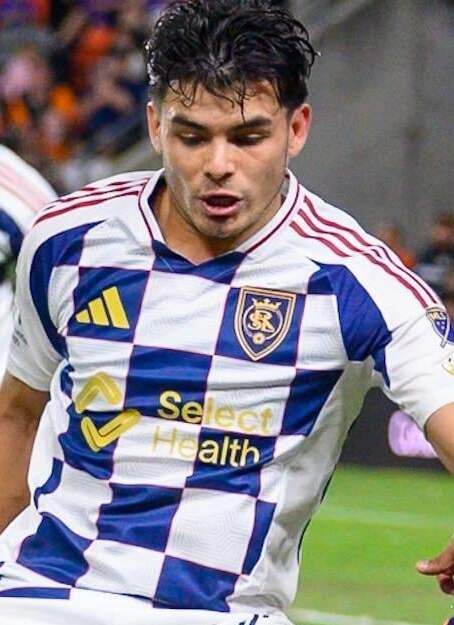
- Vera with Real Salt Lake in 2025

Personal information
- Full name: Brayan Emanuel Vera Ramírez
- Date of birth: 15 January 1999 (age 27)
- Place of birth: San Luis, Colombia
- Height: 1.80 m (5 ft 11 in)
- Position: Defender

Team information
- Current team: CF Montréal
- Number: 4

Youth career
- Leones

Senior career*
Years	Team	Apps	(Gls)
2018–2019	Leones	4	(1)
2019–2022	Lecce	10	(0)
2020–2021	→ Cosenza (loan)	22	(0)
2022	→ América de Cali (loan)	28	(0)
2023	América de Cali	1	(0)
2023–2025	Real Salt Lake	75	(6)
2025	Real Monarchs	1	(0)
2026–	CF Montréal	2	(0)

International career^{‡}
2019	Colombia U20	13	(0)
2023	Colombia	2	(0)
Medal record
Men's football
Representing Colombia
Central American and Caribbean Games
Gold medal – first place	2018 Barranquilla
- * Club domestic league appearances and goals as of 13:17, 2 March 2026 (UTC) ‡ National team caps and goals as of 16 December 2023

Brayan Emanuel Vera Ramírez (born 15 January 1999) is a Colombian professional footballer who plays as a defender for Major League Soccer club CF Montréal.

== Career ==
Vera as a Leones youth product.

On 13 June 2019, he left the club by moving to Italian side Lecce. He finished his first Serie A season with eight appearances, one of them as a starter.

On 5 October 2020, he joined Serie B club Cosenza on loan.

On 4 March 2022, Vera moved on loan to América de Cali until the end of 2022. On 19 December 2022, América de Cali announced that the transfer will be made permanent for the 2023 season.

On 13 February 2023, Vera signed with Major League Soccer side Real Salt Lake on a three-year deal.

On 10 December 2025, Vera signed with Major League Soccer club CF Montréal.

== Career statistics ==
=== Club ===
As of match played 11 December 2025

Appearances and goals by club, season and competition
Club	Season	League			National cup		Continental		Other		Total	
Club	Season	Division	Apps	Goals	Apps	Goals	Apps	Goals	Apps	Goals	Apps	Goals
Leones	2018	Categoría Primera A	1	0	2	0	—		—		3	0
Lecce	2019–20	Serie A	8	0	1	0	—		—		9	0
Lecce	2021–22	Serie B	2	0	1	0	—		—		3	0
Lecce	Total		10	0	2	0	—		—		12	0
Cosenza (loan)	2020–21	Serie B	22	0	2	0	—		—		24	0
América de Cali	2022	Categoría Primera A	27	0	2	0	—		—		29	0
América de Cali	2023	Categoría Primera A	1	0	0	0	—		—		1	0
América de Cali	Total		28	0	2	0	—		—		30	0
Real Salt Lake	2023	MLS	24	3	2	0	—		6 (Note: Three appearances in MLS Cup Playoffs, three appearances in Leagues Cup)	0	32	3
Real Salt Lake	2024	MLS	24	2	—		—		3 (Note: One appearance in MLS Cup Playoffs, two appearances in Leagues Cup)	0	27	2
Real Salt Lake	2025	MLS	27	1	—		2 (Note: Appearances in CONCACAF Champions Cup)	0	4 (Note: One appearance in MLS Cup Playoffs, three appearances in Leagues Cup)	0	33	1
Real Salt Lake	Total		75	6	2	0	2	0	13	0	92	6
Real Monarchs	2025	MLS Next Pro	1	0	—		—		—		1	0
Career total			137	6	10	0	2	0	13	0	162	6

=== International ===
As of match played 16 December 2023

Appearances and goals by national team and year
National team	Year	Apps	Goals
Colombia	2023	2	0
Total		2	0

== Honours ==
Lecce

- Serie B: 2021–22
- Central American and Caribbean Games: 2018
