= DeAndre Yedlin =

American soccer player (born 1993)

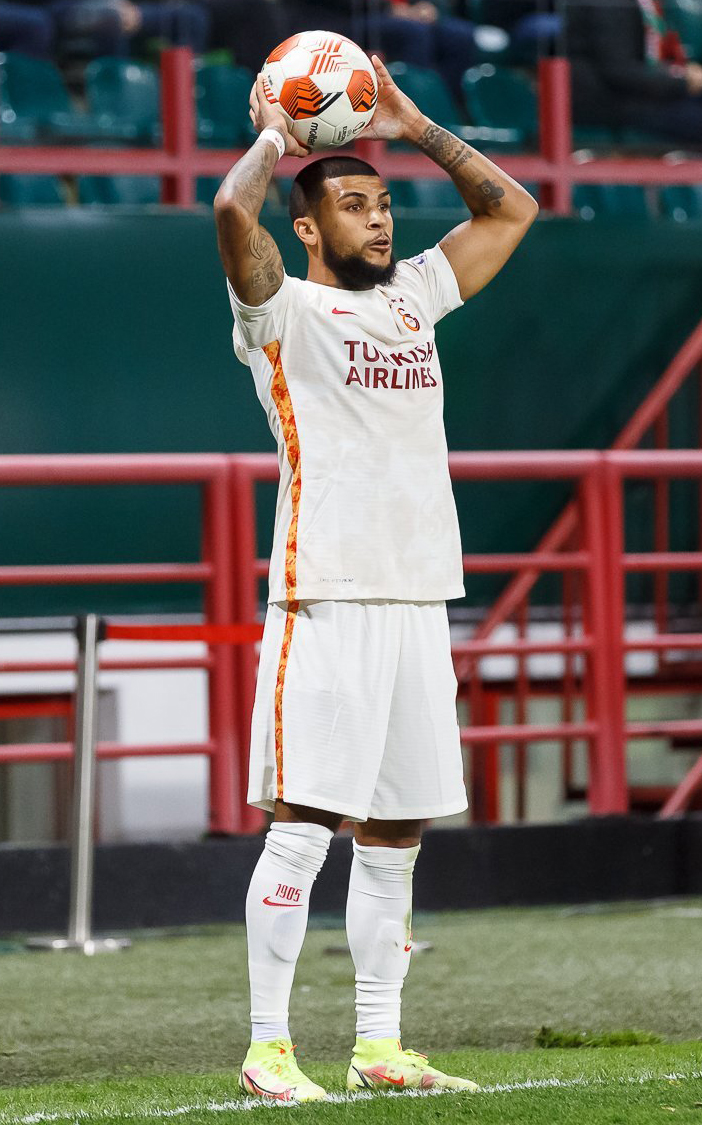
- Yedlin playing for Galatasaray in 2021

Personal information
- Full name: DeAndre Roselle Yedlin
- Date of birth: July 9, 1993 (age 33)
- Place of birth: Seattle, Washington, United States
- Height: 5 ft 7 in (1.71 m)
- Position: Right-back

Team information
- Current team: Real Salt Lake
- Number: 2

Youth career
- 2004–2006: Emerald City FC
- 2004–2006: Crossfire Premier
- 2006–2008: Northwest Nationals
- 2007–2011: O'Dea High School
- 2008–2010: New York
- 2010–2011: Seattle Sounders FC

College career
Years	Team	Apps	(Gls)
2011–2012	Akron Zips	45	(1)

Senior career*
Years	Team	Apps	(Gls)
2012	Seattle Sounders FC U-23	16	(1)
2013–2014	Seattle Sounders FC	56	(1)
2014–2016	Tottenham Hotspur	1	(0)
2015–2016	→ Sunderland (loan)	23	(0)
2016–2021	Newcastle United	112	(3)
2021–2022	Galatasaray	27	(1)
2022–2024	Inter Miami	65	(0)
2024–2025	FC Cincinnati	55	(0)
2025–	Real Salt Lake	31	(1)

International career^{‡}
2013	United States U20	4	(0)
2014–2023	United States	81	(0)
Medal record
Representing United States
Men's soccer
CONCACAF Nations League
Winner	2021 United States
CONCACAF Cup
Runner-up	2015 United States
- * Club domestic league appearances and goals as of 03:21, November 8, 2026 (UTC) ‡ National team caps and goals as of July 12, 2023

DeAndre Roselle Yedlin (born July 9, 1993) is an American professional soccer player who plays as a defender for Major League Soccer club Real Salt Lake. Primarily a right-back, Yedlin has also featured as a right wing-back and wide midfielder.

== Youth, college, and amateur career ==
Yedlin was born and raised in Seattle, Washington. Yedlin began playing soccer at age four and learned while watching his uncle, Dylan Walton-Yedlin, from the sideline. Yedlin was a product of O'Dea High School in Seattle, and was part of Washington Youth Soccer's State Olympic Development Program (ODP) from 2006 to 2009. He also played youth soccer for Emerald City FC and Northwest Nationals before going to U.S. Soccer Development Academy club Crossfire Premier.

Yedlin stayed in the DA but moved to the Seattle Sounders FC youth academy for the 2010–11 season. Seattle Sounders youth director Darren Sawatzky first saw him play at age 11 and later said that Yedlin was "an offensive player at the time, he was tricky, he had explosiveness and could run for days." Seattle Sounders FC sporting director Chris Henderson said of Yedlin: "DeAndre has great quickness and speed. He reads the game well, keeps possession, but he's able to attack the flank and get crosses in."

On February 8, 2011, Yedlin signed a letter of intent to play college soccer at the University of Akron under coach Caleb Porter. In his first year, Yedlin started in 20 of his 23 games for the Zips, playing alongside future professionals Wil Trapp, Darren Mattocks, Aodhan Quinn, and Scott Caldwell. He scored his first collegiate goal on September 28, 2011, in a 3–1 victory over Ohio State.

He finished the year with six assists and made the College Soccer News Freshman All-American team. In his second year, Yedlin made 22 appearances and finished the year with six assists as well.

During the collegiate offseason, Yedlin played for Seattle Sounders FC U-23 in the Premier Development League, and was named to the 2012 All-PDL First XI for his play.

== Professional career ==
=== Seattle Sounders FC ===
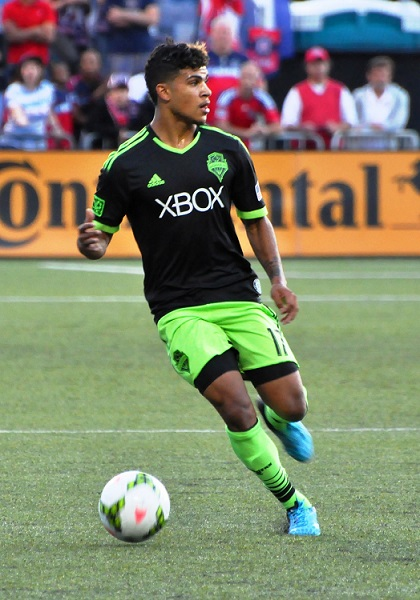
Yedlin playing for Seattle Sounders FC in 2014

On January 11, 2013, after two seasons with Akron, Yedlin signed with Seattle Sounders FC as the club's first homegrown player.

He made his debut on March 2 in a 1–0 home defeat to the Montreal Impact. Yedlin was named to the MLS Team of the Week for his performance, becoming the first rookie to earn the honor in his professional debut. On March 12, Yedlin shined and scored his first professional goal for the club in a 3–1 win against Tigres in the second leg of the Sounders 3–2 CONCACAF Champions League quarterfinal aggregate victory.

On July 15, Yedlin was named to the MLS All-Star team for their match against Roma on July 31, making him the first rookie to be named to the All-Star team since 2005 when Michael Parkhurst was selected during his rookie season. Yedlin was ranked 3rd among MLS players under the age of 24 in 2013, according to MLSSoccer.com.

Yedlin scored his first professional league goal in a 1–1 draw with the Colorado Rapids on July 20, 2013. Yedlin was again named to the MLS All-Star team in 2014, starting in a 2–1 victory against FC Bayern Munich.

=== Tottenham Hotspur ===
After success for club and breaking out at the 2014 FIFA World Cup, it was announced on August 13, 2014, that Yedlin had been transferred to Premier League club Tottenham Hotspur, signing a four-year contract with the club. Other European clubs, including A.S. Roma, were interested.

Yedlin remained with Seattle before joining Tottenham in January 2015. Yedlin would celebrate New Year's at Harry Kane's home. He trained with Tottenham for the first time on January 7, 2015. He made his first appearance for the under-21 team on January 9, 2015. Yedlin made his Premier League debut on April 11, 2015, in a loss to Aston Villa.

==== Loan to Sunderland ====
On September 1, 2015, Sunderland acquired Yedlin on a year-long loan. On September 22, Yedlin made his Sunderland debut in a League Cup match, playing the full 90 minutes and notching an assist for Sunderland's only goal in a 4–1 loss to Manchester City. On October 3, 2015, Yedlin started his first Premier League game against West Ham United.

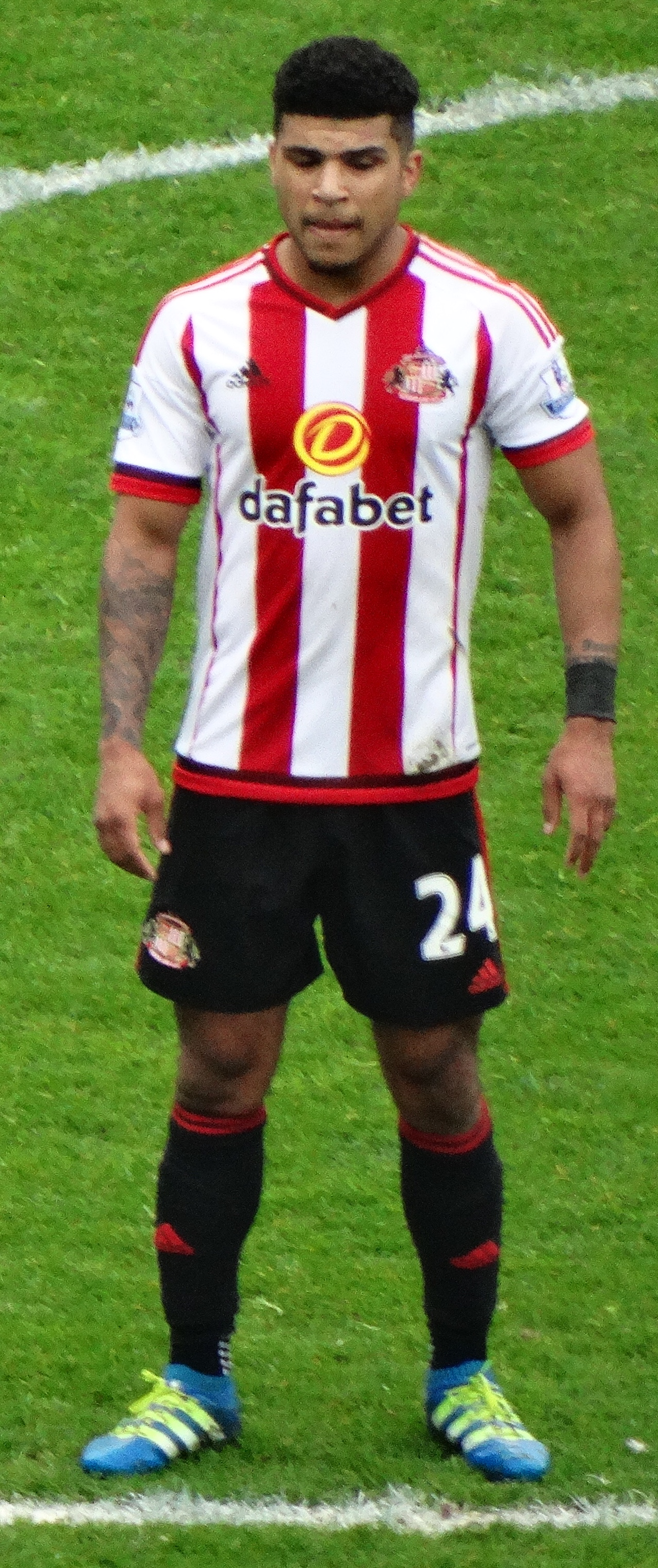
Yedlin playing for Sunderland in 2016

=== Newcastle United ===
On August 24, 2016, Yedlin moved to Newcastle United for £5 million on a five-year contract. He made his debut on August 27, in a match against Brighton and Hove Albion as an 88th-minute substitute for Yoan Gouffran. Two weeks later, Yedlin scored his first goal for the club and his first in three years in a 2–0 victory against Derby County on September 10. He scored his first Premier League goal on September 1, 2018, in a 2–1 defeat at Manchester City.

=== Galatasaray ===
On February 1, 2021, Yedlin joined the Turkish side Galatasaray on a 2.5-year contract. On March 19, Yedlin scored his first goal for the club, his first since 2019, conceded a penalty, and was sent off in a dramatic 3–4 defeat at home to Çaykur Rizespor. On January 26, 2022, his contract with Galatasaray was terminated by mutual consent.

=== Inter Miami ===
Yedlin joined Inter Miami CF on February 2, 2022, on a four-year contract with an additional one-year option. "It's almost a DP signing for us, really, in terms of his quality," Manager Phil Neville said. "He's played at the top, top level in the top soccer nations in the world. So we hope his experience, his quality, his leadership, and the fact that he's American I think is really important. We have a young, new team and we want experience in there as well." Yedlin stated "I know when I was in MLS, [defending] was a weakness in my game," after the move was announced. "Not only 1-v-1 but positionally. But now I'm coming back, being in a lot of different situations and a lot of different formations, playing different positions to a point now where I'm a lot more comfortable in those situations. I think I'm a lot better defender now than I was when I left."[1]

Yedlin was the vice captain of the squad which won Inter Miami's first ever trophy, the 2023 Leagues Cup. The video of Lionel Messi offering the armband to Yedlin to raise the trophy with him went viral.

=== FC Cincinnati ===
On March 4, 2024, Yedlin moved to FC Cincinnati. When asked about the decision to leave a team led by Lionel Messi and Luis Suárez to join FC Cincinnati, Yedlin responded that he and his wife were attracted to Cincinnati as it is a great place to raise a family and has TQL Stadium, which he considered to be the best soccer specific stadium in the United States. It was also announced that he would wear number 91 in honor of his uncle.

== International career ==
=== 2013: Youth level ===
Yedlin was named to the United States under-20 squad on June 7, 2013, for the 2013 FIFA U-20 World Cup in Turkey. Yedlin made his U-20 international debut a week later in a 3–1 victory over Portugal.

=== 2014: Senior debut and first FIFA World Cup ===
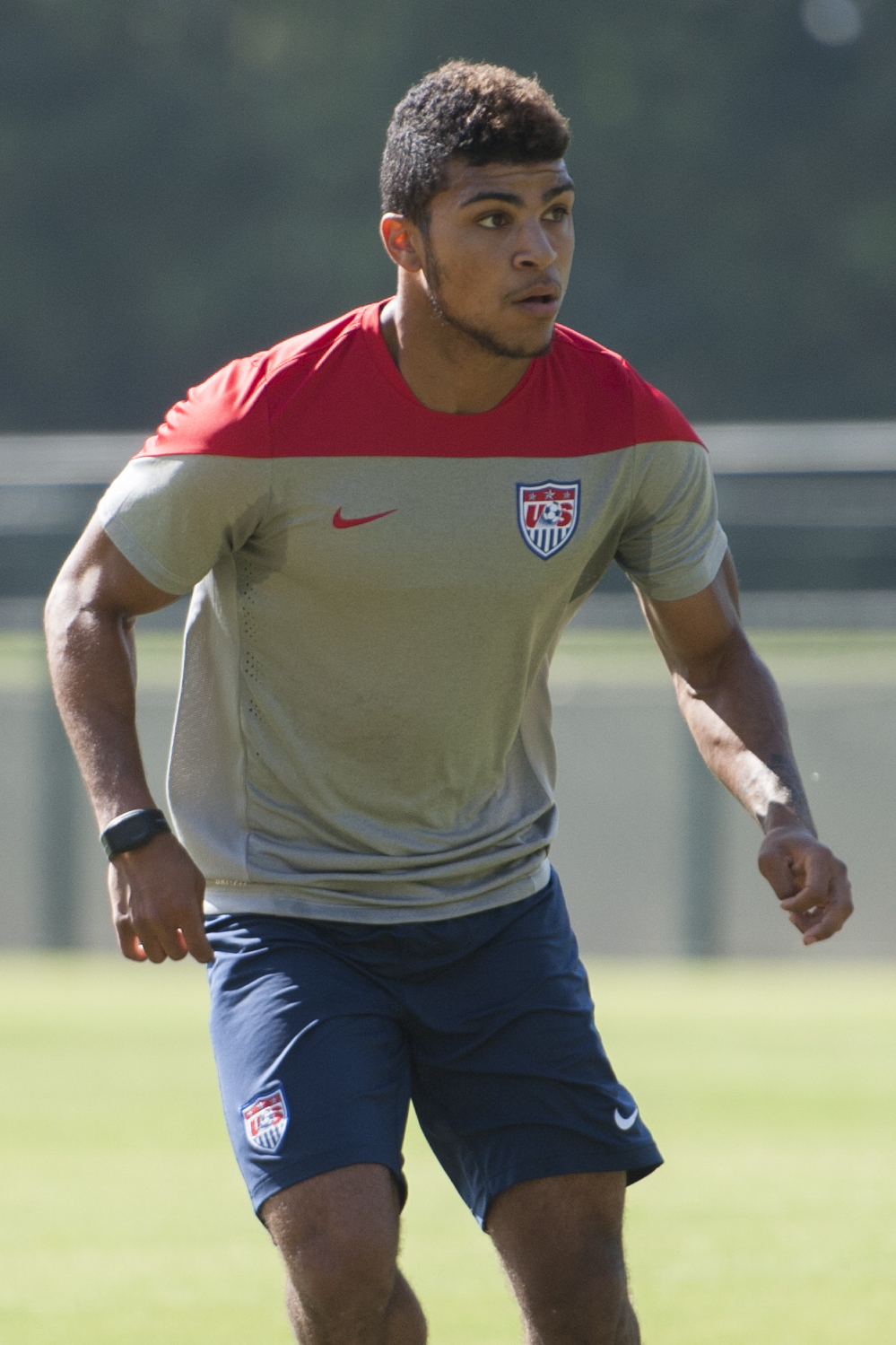
Yedlin training in 2014 in Brazil

Yedlin earned his first call-up to the senior men's national team on January 3, 2014. He made his first appearance with the senior team on February 1, 2014, in a friendly against South Korea.

After impressing in January and April, Yedlin was a surprise inclusion by US manager Jurgen Klinsmann on the U.S. final 23-man roster for the 2014 FIFA World Cup. He made his World Cup debut against Portugal, coming on as a late second-half substitute. He helped set up Sounders teammate Clint Dempsey's late goal which put the U.S. up 2–1.

He also came on late in the next game, a 1–0 loss v. Germany; his deep cross to Dempsey was headed off target. In the round of 16 match against Belgium, Yedlin came on as an early substitute for the injured Fabian Johnson, providing most of the vertical threat for the Americans. Yedlin's performances took many by surprise, being called a "breakout star" by the New York Times.

=== 2016–2017: Copa América Centenario and failures ===
Yedlin continued playing for the US after 2014, playing in both midfield for defense for Klinsmann. Yedlin was named to the squad for the 2016 Copa America Centenario, starting most games. Yedlin received a second yellow card (and subsequent red) in a match against Paraguay. When healthy, Yedlin participated in the US's failed qualification for the 2018 FIFA World Cup under both Klinsmann and Bruce Arena. Yedlin started at right back in the final qualification match, a 1–2 loss to Trinidad and Tobago on October 10, 2017.

Yedlin continued to play regularly as a right back under 2018 caretaker manager Dave Sarachan, taking on a leadership role in the new cycle as one of the few players carried over. “DeAndre, he is now one of the seasoned guys, you would say, with caps,” Sarachan explained in September 2018. “I think, again, has shown a lot of maturation now in terms of his approach working with a lot of these young guys." Yedlin stated wanting to turn the page on the failed 2018 cycle: "obviously want to put the past behind us and we all know what happened... it’s kind of a clean slate, a fresh start. I am excited for that.”

Yedlin continued under fulltime manager Gregg Berhalter. Yedlin captained the national team in a March 2019 friendly against Chile, finishing 1–1. Yedlin missed the 2019 CONCACAF Gold Cup due to a groin injury, but participated in the group stage and finals of the 2019-20 CONCACAF Nations League.

On November 9, 2022, Yedlin was called up to the final 26-man squad for the 2022 FIFA World Cup, being the only U.S. player to play in both the 2014 and 2022 FIFA World Cups. “He’s a glue guy,” Berhalter said after announcing the roster. “He’s there for the team, creates atmosphere for the team. Sometimes he’s a shoulder to cry on or talk to, other times he’s a motivator.” “There’s a queue of questions people have for DeAndre,” said Tyler Adams, the USMNT captain in Qatar.

A report by Paul Tenorio and Sam Stejskal of The Athletic after the tournament revealed that Yedlin was one of the veterans on the team that pulled young star Giovanni Reyna aside after "an alarming lack of effort" after the Wales match, in which an injured Reyna did not appear. The report said that the situation became untenable and that it had to be addressed multiple times by players and coaches, after which Reyna eventually apologized to his teammates for his lack of effort. After the apology, several players on the team spoke up to hold Reyna accountable for his actions, and the 20-year-old turned a corner in regards to his effort in training, per the sources in the report.

Yedlin appeared in two matches in Qatar, both as a tactical substitute at right-back for Sergiño Dest. Yedlin appeared in the Group B match against Wales, then again in the Round of 16 match against the Netherlands, in which the US lost 3-1.

== Personal life ==
Yedlin is one-quarter black, one-quarter Native American, and half Latvian Jewish on his mother's side.

Yedlin is very close with his mother, Rebecca Yedlin, who had him when she was very young and is now a college faculty member; his father has never been part of his life. He was raised by his maternal grandfather, Ira Nathan Yedlin, and step-grandmother, Vicki Walton. Yedlin has a sister Jenea who is three years younger than he is.

During the 2020–2023 racial unrest in the United States, caused by the police murder of George Floyd, Yedlin was an outspoken supporter of the Black Lives Matter movement, asking if there was truly "liberty and justice" for all Americans and recalling the memories of his grandparents who had lived under the Jim Crow system of racial oppression. Yedlin spoke about the country's long history of police brutality against African Americans: "as a young black man in America it's one of those things you just grow up with. You know you have a higher chance of being stopped by the police, or put in jail or eventually being killed." Yedlin admitted he was questioning whether he'd continue to play for the national team. "It's something I've thought a lot about during this quarantine," Yedlin said. "My grandfather, my grandmother especially, I have a whole family of activists, they've always told me to stand up for what I believe in. There's no amount of money that can make me shut up about something I think is wrong. It's one of those waiting games to see if a change does happen. But if things go as they stand it's hard for me as an African American male to represent a country that does things like this where all people aren't equal."

In May 2021, Yedlin joined the ownership group of USL Championship club San Diego Loyal SC.

== Career statistics ==
=== Club ===
As of match played November 19, 2026

Appearances and goals by club, season and competition
Club	Season	League			National cup (Note: Includes U.S. Open Cup, FA Cup and Turkish Cup)		League cup (Note: Includes EFL Cup and Leagues Cup)		Continental		Other (Note: Includes MLS Cup playoffs)		Total	
Club	Season	Division	Apps	Goals	Apps	Goals	Apps	Goals	Apps	Goals	Apps	Goals	Apps	Goals
Seattle Sounders FC	2013	Major League Soccer	31	1	–		–		4 (Note: Appearances in CONCACAF Champions League/Cup)	1	2	1	37	3
Seattle Sounders FC	2014	Major League Soccer	25	0	3	0	–		–		4	0	32	0
Seattle Sounders FC	Total		56	1	3	0	–		4	1	6	1	69	3
Tottenham Hotspur	2014–15	Premier League	1	0	–		–		–		–		1	0
Sunderland (loan)	2015–16	Premier League	23	0	1	0	1	0	–		–		25	0
Newcastle United	2016–17	Championship	27	1	2	0	3	0	–		–		32	1
Newcastle United	2017–18	Premier League	34	0	–		–		–		–		34	0
Newcastle United	2018–19	Premier League	29	1	–		–		–		–		29	1
Newcastle United	2019–20	Premier League	16	1	4	0	–		–		–		20	1
Newcastle United	2020–21	Premier League	6	0	1	0	3	0	–		–		10	0
Newcastle United	Total		112	3	7	0	6	0	–		–		125	3
Galatasaray	2020–21	Süper Lig	11	1	1	0	–		–		–		12	1
Galatasaray	2021–22	Süper Lig	16	0	–		–		8 (Note: One appearance in UEFA Champions League, seven appearances in UEFA Europa League)	0	–		24	0
Galatasaray	Total		27	1	1	0	–		8	0	–		36	1
Inter Miami	2022	Major League Soccer	34	0	3	0	–		–		1	0	38	0
Inter Miami	2023	Major League Soccer	28	0	6	0	7	0	–		–		41	0
Inter Miami	2024	Major League Soccer	3	0	–		–		–		–		3	0
Inter Miami	Total		65	0	9	0	7	0	–		1	0	82	0
FC Cincinnati	2024	Major League Soccer	28	0	–		2	1	2	0	3	0	35	1
FC Cincinnati	2025	Major League Soccer	27	0	–		2	0	3	0	–		32	0
FC Cincinnati	Total		55	0	–		4	1	5	0	3	0	67	1
Real Salt Lake	2025	Major League Soccer	7	1	–		–		–		1	0	8	1
Real Salt Lake	2026	Major League Soccer	24	0	–		3	0	–		1	0	28	0
Real Salt Lake	Total		31	1	–		3	0	–		2	0	36	1
Career total			370	6	21	0	21	1	17	1	12	1	441	9

=== International ===
As of match played July 12, 2023

Appearances and goals by national team and year
National team	Year	Apps	Goals
United States	2014	10	0
United States	2015	19	0
United States	2016	14	0
United States	2017	6	0
United States	2018	8	0
United States	2019	5	0
United States	2020	0	0
United States	2021	9	0
United States	2022	6	0
United States	2023	4	0
Total		81	0

== Honors ==
Akron Zips

- Mid-American Conference Tournament: 2012
- Mid-American Conference Regular Season: 2011, 2012

Seattle Sounders FC U23

- USL PDL Northwest Division: 2012

Seattle Sounders FC

- Supporters' Shield: 2014
- Western Conference Regular Season: 2014
- U.S. Open Cup: 2014

Newcastle United

- EFL Championship: 2016–17

Inter Miami

- Supporters' Shield: 2024
- Eastern Conference Regular Season: 2024
- Leagues Cup: 2023

United States

- CONCACAF Nations League: 2019–20

Individual

- College Soccer News Freshman All-American Team: 2011
- All-PDL First XI: 2012
- MLS All-Star: 2013, 2014, 2022
- U.S. Soccer Young Athlete of the Year: 2014

== See also ==
- List of select Jewish association football (soccer) players
- List of Afro-Latinos
