= Gary Gladding =

American physicist

Gary Earle Gladding is an American physicist.

Gladding earned a doctorate in physics from Harvard University in 1971 and joined the University of Illinois at Urbana–Champaign faculty in 1973. He was elected a fellow of the American Physical Society in 1999, "[f]or leadership, pedagogical insights and creativity in adapting best-practice physics pedagogy to produce an innovative, integrated curriculum for calculus-based introductory physics courses appropriate for large research universities."
