= Braian Ojeda =

Paraguayan footballer (born 2000)

- Ojeda with Paraguay in 2026

Personal information
- Full name: Braian Óscar Ojeda Rodríguez
- Date of birth: 27 June 2000 (age 26)
- Place of birth: Itauguá, Paraguay
- Height: 1.73 m (5 ft 8 in)
- Position: Central midfielder

Team information
- Current team: Orlando City
- Number: 8

Youth career
- Olimpia

Senior career*
Years	Team	Apps	(Gls)
2018–2021	Olimpia	28	(1)
2019–2020	→ Defensa y Justicia (loan)	10	(0)
2021–2023	Nottingham Forest	3	(0)
2022–2023	→ Real Salt Lake (loan)	27	(0)
2023–2026	Real Salt Lake	72	(4)
2026–	Orlando City	24	(2)

International career^{‡}
2017	Paraguay U17	11	(0)
2019	Paraguay U20	3	(1)
2020	Paraguay U23	2	(0)
2021–	Paraguay	18	(0)
- * Club domestic league appearances and goals as of 23:46, 7 November 2026 (UTC) ‡ National team caps and goals as of 04:08, 30 June 2026 (UTC)

Braian Óscar Ojeda Rodríguez (born 27 June 2000) is a Paraguayan professional footballer who plays as a central midfielder for Major League Soccer club Orlando City and the Paraguay national team.

Ojeda graduated from the academy of Olimpia in 2018, with whom he helped win that year's Clausura, before joining Defensa y Justicia the following year on loan. After his return, Ojeda joined Nottingham Forest in 2021, but only made three appearances with them before joining Real Salt Lake on loan the following year. In mid-2023, Ojeda joined Real Salt Lake on a permanent deal. In 2026, Ojeda joined fellow Major League Soccer side Orlando City.

Ojeda represented Paraguay at the U17, U20, and U23 levels, before representing the senior team in 2021. With Paraguay, Ojeda has played at the 2021 Copa América and the 2026 FIFA World Cup.

== Club career ==
Ojeda began his career with Paraguayan Primera División team Olimpia. He was promoted into senior football at the end of the 2018 campaign, appearing for his professional debut on 2 December in a 3–2 victory over Sol de América; he was substituted off at half-time. Another appearances followed a week later against 3 de Febrero, as Olimpia received their forty-second league title. He also participated in three Copa Paraguay games that year. In March 2019, Ojeda renewed his contract. In July, after not featuring in 2019, Ojeda was loaned out to Defensa y Justicia of the Argentine Primera División.

On 31 August 2021, Ojeda moved to EFL Championship side Nottingham Forest on a four-year deal for an undisclosed fee. He made his debut in a goalless draw against Luton Town on 23 November 2021.

On 4 August 2022, Ojeda was loaned to Major League Soccer (MLS) side Real Salt Lake for the 2022–23 season. On 1 August 2023, the deal was made permanent and Ojeda joined Salt Lake on a permanent transfer.

On 2 January 2026, Ojeda signed with fellow MLS team Orlando City on a four-season contract in exchange for $1.3 million in general allocation money split across two seasons. Ojeda made his debut for Orlando City in the team's season-opening match on 21 February as Orlando lost 2–1 to the New York Red Bulls. On 19 May, Ojeda made two assists in a 4–1 win over Atlanta United in the quarter-finals of the U.S. Open Cup, helping to advance Orlando City to their first semi-finals since 2022. Ojeda scored his first goal for Orlando by heading in a crossed ball from Eduard Atuesta in a 4–0 win at the San Jose Earthquakes. On 6 August, the team announced that Ojeda had undergone a surgery to repair a Jones fracture in his right foot and would be out until fall of that year. On 7 November, Ojeda scored the lone goal of a 1–0 win over New England Revolution, ensuring that Orlando City would host the MLS Cup playoffs wild card game against FC Cincinnati. Additionally, as a result of his performance, he was named to the Team of the Matchday.

== International career ==
Ojeda represented Paraguay at U17 and U20 level. He appeared eight times at the 2017 South American U-17 Championship in Chile, as they qualified for the 2017 FIFA U-17 World Cup in India; where he featured against Mali, New Zealand and the United States. In 2019, Ojeda played three times at the South American U-20 Championship.

In 2020, Ojeda held representative honours with the Paraguay national under-23 squad at the 2020 CONMEBOL Pre-Olympic Tournament.

He made his debut for the senior squad on 2 September 2021 in a World Cup qualifier against Ecuador, a 2–0 away loss. He substituted Hugo Martínez in the 65th-minute.

On 1 June 2026, it was announced that Paraguay head coach Gustavo Alfaro had selected Ojeda for the 2026 FIFA World Cup.

== Career statistics ==
=== Club ===
As of 7 November 2026

Appearances and goals by club, season and competition
Club	Season	League			National cup (Note: Includes Copa Paraguay, Copa Argentina, FA Cup, and U.S. Open Cup)		League cup		Continental		Other		Total	
Club	Season	Division	Apps	Goals	Apps	Goals	Apps	Goals	Apps	Goals	Apps	Goals	Apps	Goals
Olimpia	2018	Paraguayan Primera División	2	0	3	0	—		0	0	0	0	5	0
Olimpia	2019	Paraguayan Primera División	0	0	0	0	—		0	0	0	0	0	0
Olimpia	2020	Paraguayan Primera División	13	0	0	0	—		0	0	0	0	13	0
Olimpia	2021	Paraguayan Primera División	13	1	0	0	—		9	0	0	0	22	1
Olimpia	Total		28	1	3	0	—		9	0	0	0	40	1
Defensa y Justicia (loan)	2019–20	Argentine Primera División	10	0	0	0	0	0	2 (Note: Appearance(s) in the Copa Sudamericana)	0	0	0	12	0
Nottingham Forest	2021–22	EFL Championship	3	0	0	0	0	0	—		—		3	0
Real Salt Lake (loan)	2022	Major League Soccer	6	0	—		—		—		1 (Note: Appearances in MLS Cup playoffs)	0	7	0
Real Salt Lake (loan)	2023	Major League Soccer	21	0	4	0	—		—		2 (Note: Appearances in Leagues Cup)	0	27	0
Real Salt Lake	2023	Major League Soccer	9	0	1	0	—		—		5 (Note: Two appearances in Leagues Cup, three appearances in MLS Cup playoffs)	0	15	0
Real Salt Lake	2024	Major League Soccer	33	2	1	0	—		—		4 (Note: Two appearances in Leagues Cup, two appearances in MLS Cup playoffs)	0	38	2
Real Salt Lake	2025	Major League Soccer	30	2	0	0	—		2 (Note: Appearances in CONCACAF Champions Cup)	0	4 (Note: Three appearances in Leagues Cup, one appearance in MLS Cup playoffs)	3	36	5
Real Salt Lake	Total		99	4	6	0	—		2	0	16	3	123	7
Orlando City	2026	Major League Soccer	24	2	3	0	—		—		0	0	27	2
Career total			164	7	12	0	0	0	13	0	16	3	205	10

=== International ===
As of match played 29 June 2026

Appearances and goals by national team and year
National team	Year	Apps	Goals
Paraguay	2021	2	0
Paraguay	2022	5	0
Paraguay	2023	2	0
Paraguay	2025	5	0
Paraguay	2026	4	0
Total		18	0

== Honours ==
Olimpia

- Paraguayan Primera División: 2018 Clausura

Nottingham Forest

- EFL Championship play-offs: 2022
