= James N. Gladding House =

- U.S. National Register of Historic Places
- U.S. Historic district – Contributing property
- NM State Register of Cultural Properties
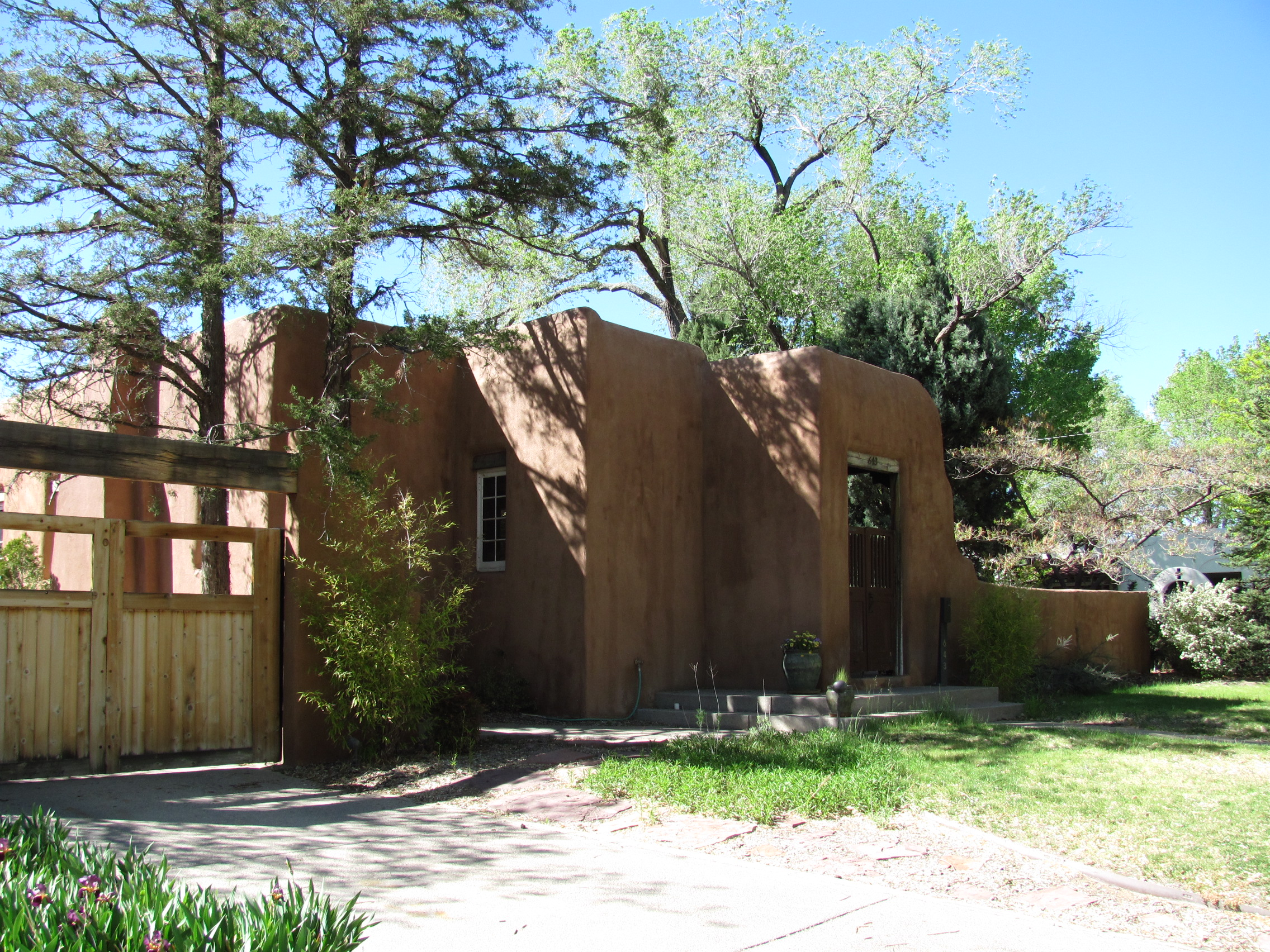
- James N. Gladding House in 2010

- Location within New Mexico Location within the United States
- Location: 643 Cedar St. NE, Albuquerque, New Mexico
- Coordinates: 35°05′17″N 106°37′50″W
- Built: 1926
- Architect: James N. Gladding
- Architectural style: Pueblo Revival
- Part of: Spruce Park Historic District (ID82003317)
- NRHP reference No.: 80002535
- NMSRCP No.: 759

Significant dates
- Added to NRHP: November 17, 1980
- Designated CP: July 6, 1982
- Designated NMSRCP: December 14, 1979

The James N. Gladding House is a historic house in the Spruce Park neighborhood of Albuquerque, New Mexico. It is listed on the National Register of Historic Places both individually and as a contributing property in the Spruce Park Historic District. The house was built in 1926 by James N. Gladding, who was the president of the Southwestern Construction Company and a partner in the Gaastra & Gladding architecture firm with T. Charles Gaastra. Gladding was the developer of the Spruce Park neighborhood, then known as the Country Club Addition, and built the house as a model home for the subdivision. He later lived there himself from 1928 to 1934. Later residents included novelist Conrad Richter and a local artist who constructed a studio at the rear of the property.

The house is notable as a fine example of the Pueblo Revival style architecture which was popular in Albuquerque during the interwar period. It is a one-story, L-shaped adobe building organized around a walled courtyard. The house is one room deep and has a portal or veranda, supported by corbelled wooden posts and vigas, along both sides of the courtyard. Two later additions were constructed at the rear of the house, a freestanding artist's studio, and a two-story addition which joined the studio to the main house.
