= Emeka Eneli =

American soccer player (born 1999)

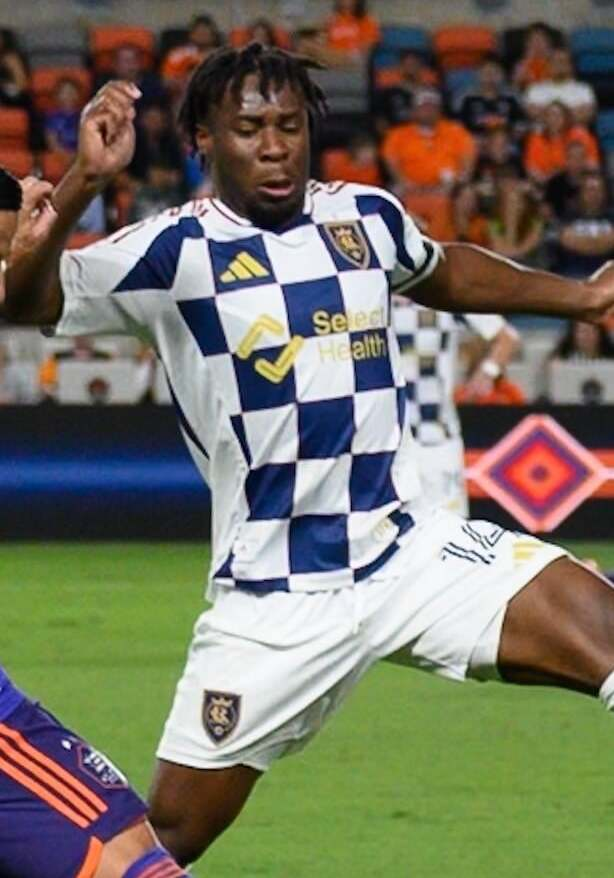
- Eneli with Real Salt Lake in 2025

Personal information
- Full name: Chukwuemeka Somto Eneli
- Date of birth: October 18, 1999 (age 27)
- Place of birth: Lansing, Michigan, U.S.
- Height: 5 ft 9 in (1.75 m)
- Position: Midfielder

Team information
- Current team: Real Salt Lake
- Number: 14

Youth career
- 2012–2017: Columbus Crew
- 2017–2018: Ohio Premier

College career
Years	Team	Apps	(Gls)
2018–2022	Cornell Big Red	60	(20)

Senior career*
Years	Team	Apps	(Gls)
2019–2020	Lionsbridge	16	(3)
2022	Flint City Bucks	12	(4)
2023–	Real Salt Lake	68	(1)
2023	Real Monarchs	1	(0)

International career^{‡}
2025–	United States	2	(0)
- * Club domestic league appearances and goals as of June 6, 2025 ‡ National team caps and goals as of January 22, 2025

Chukwuemeka Somto "Emeka" Eneli (born October 18, 1999) is an American professional soccer player who plays as a midfielder for Major League Soccer club Real Salt Lake and the United States national team.

== Career ==
=== Youth and college ===
Eneli was born in Lansing, Michigan, but moved to Dublin, Ohio was he was eight years old. He attended Dublin Coffman High School, where he played one year of varsity soccer. He also played soccer with the Columbus Crew academy between 2012 and 2017, before spending a season with Ohio Premier, who he helped to the ENPL national title in 2018 and was named to the ECNL All-American and ECNL All-Midwest teams.

In 2018, Eneli attended Cornell University graduating in 2022 with a major in Biological Engineering and a minor in Business. He played college soccer, serving as team captain in his junior and senior years. In four seasons with Big Red spanning across five years due to the COVID-19 pandemic leading to the cancellation of the 2020 season, Eneli made 60 appearances, scoring 20 goals and tallying 17 assists. In 2021, Eneli earned All-Ivy League First Team and Second Team United Soccer Coaches Men's Northeast Region honors. 2022 saw Eneli named a Second Team All-American and helped Cornell qualify for the NCAA Sweet Sixteen for the first time in nearly three decades. Eneli earned 2018 Rookie of the Year for the Ivy League Mens Soccer conference. Eneli finished the season second in the Ivy League in points (16) and goals (7).

=== Professional career ===
While at college, Eneli also competed in the USL League Two. He spent 2019 and 2020 with Lionsbridge FC, scoring three goals in 16 games. In 2022, he spent the season with Flint City Bucks, making 16 appearances across the regular season and playoffs, netting four goals and adding an assist.

Following the 2022 season, Eneli was announced as an eligible player in the 2023 MLS SuperDraft. Eneli was drafted by Real Salt Lake with the 25th pick of the first round.

Eneli made his MLS debut for RSL on March 25, 2023, starting in a 4–0 loss at home to St. Louis City SC. Eneli scored his first career MLS goal on March 9, 2024, in a 2-1 loss to the Colorado Rapids. On November 2, 2024, Eneli's scored his second goal for the club, an equalizer in the MLS Cup Playoffs against Minnesota United that forced penalties. RSL would lose the shootout.

== Personal ==
Born in the United States, Eneli is of Nigerian descent.

== Career statistics ==
=== International ===
As of match played January 22, 2025

Appearances and goals by national team and year
National team	Year	Apps	Goals
United States	2025	2	0
Total		2	0
