= Justen Glad =

American soccer player (born 1997)

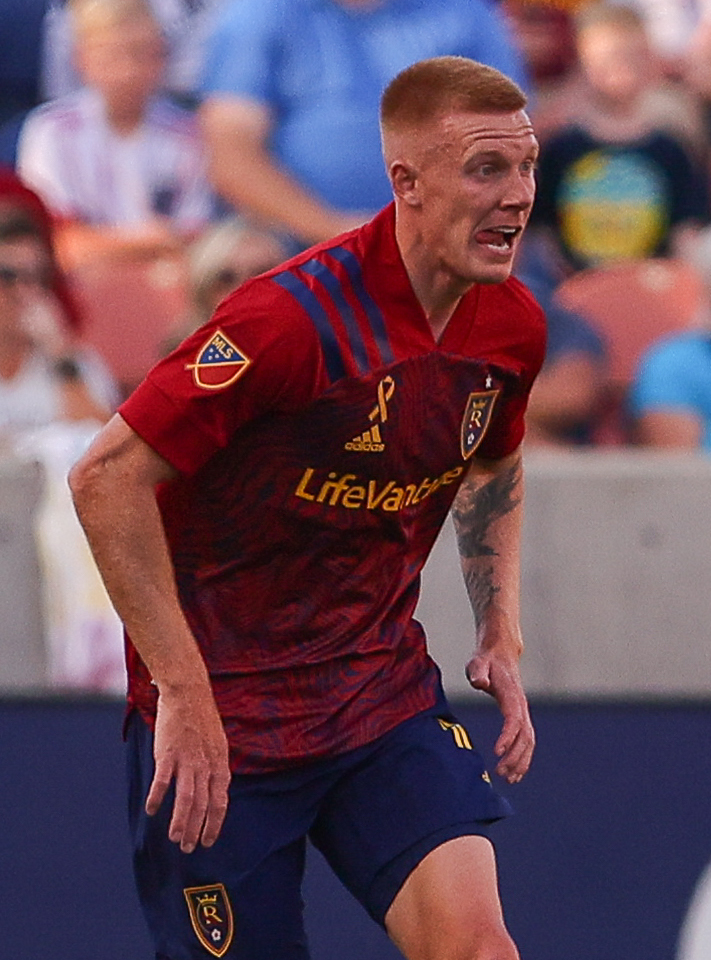
- Glad playing for Real Salt Lake in 2021

Personal information
- Full name: Justen Thomas Glad
- Date of birth: February 28, 1997 (age 29)
- Place of birth: Pasadena, California, United States
- Height: 6 ft 0 in (1.83 m)
- Position: Defender

Team information
- Current team: Real Salt Lake
- Number: 15

Youth career
- 2012–2014: Real Salt Lake AZ

Senior career*
Years	Team	Apps	(Gls)
2014–	Real Salt Lake	272	(13)
2015–2019	Real Monarchs	9	(1)

International career^{‡}
2013	United States U17	8	(0)
2014–2015	United States U18	4	(1)
2015–2017	United States U20	15	(1)
2019–2021	United States U23	3	(0)
Medal record
Representing United States
Winner	CONCACAF U-20 Championship	2017
- * Club domestic league appearances and goals as of November 25, 2025 ‡ National team caps and goals as of June 4, 2017

Justen Thomas Glad (born February 28, 1997) is an American professional soccer player who plays as a defender for Major League Soccer club Real Salt Lake.

== Youth soccer ==
Born in Pasadena, California, Glad moved with his family to Seattle before finally settling in Tucson, Arizona, where he grew up playing soccer. He joined the Real Salt Lake Arizona Academy in 2012. He was part of RSL's first national championship Academy team, scoring the winning goal in the championship match. He was then named to the USSDA Western Conference “Starting XI” and was named as an NSCAA High School All-American for the 2012-13 Academy season.

== Club career ==
=== Real Salt Lake ===
On April 7, 2014, Glad signed a homegrown contract with Real Salt Lake, making him the seventh homegrown signing in club history. He made his professional debut in April 2015 for USL affiliate club Real Monarchs SLC and scored his first goal in a 1–1 draw against Portland Timbers 2. Glad made his Major League Soccer debut at the age of 18 with Real Salt Lake in June 2015. Glad became a regular starter with Real Salt Lake in 2016, starting 27 MLS matches, and was named the RSL 2016 defender of the year. He is currently third all-time in terms of games and minutes played for Real Salt Lake, behind club legends Nick Rimando and Kyle Beckerman. He was voted the team's most valuable player in 2022.

== International career ==
Glad was a member of the U.S. under-17 squad that competed in the 2013 CONCACAF U-17 Championship. He also represented the U.S. in the under-18 level. Glad was one of numerous young uncapped players called into the United States men's national soccer team January 2018 training camp in advance of a friendly against Bosnia and Herzegovina. Glad was named to the final 20-player United States under-23 roster for the 2020 CONCACAF Men's Olympic Qualifying Championship in March 2021. While playing for US Youth National teams, Glad was also given “Best 11” honors in both the CONCACAF U-20 (2017) and U-23 (2020) tournaments, and he played a major role on the first U-20 team to ever win the CONCACAF championship.

== Career statistics ==
=== Club ===
As of match played 23 October 2025

Appearances and goals by club, season and competition
Club	Season	League			National cup		Playoffs		Continental		Other		Total	
Club	Season	Division	Apps	Goals	Apps	Goals	Apps	Goals	Apps	Goals	Apps	Goals	Apps	Goals
Real Salt Lake	2014	MLS	0	0	0	0	0	0	—		—		0	0
Real Salt Lake	2015	MLS	7	0	0	0	0	0	1 (Note: Appearance(s) in CONCACAF Champions League/CONCACAF Champions Cup)	0	—		8	0
Real Salt Lake	2016	MLS	28	2	1	0	1	0	0	0	—		30	2
Real Salt Lake	2017	MLS	18	0	0	0	—		—		—		18	0
Real Salt Lake	2018	MLS	33	0	0	0	2	0	—		—		35	0
Real Salt Lake	2019	MLS	23	0	0	0	1	0	—		1 (Note: Appearance(s) in Leagues Cup)	0	25	0
Real Salt Lake	2020	MLS	17	1	—		—		—		0	0	17	1
Real Salt Lake	2021	MLS	31	2	—		3	0	—		—		34	2
Real Salt Lake	2022	MLS	26	3	1	0	1	0	—		1	0	29	3
Real Salt Lake	2023	MLS	32	5	5	0	2	0	—		3	0	42	5
Real Salt Lake	2024	MLS	26	0	1	0	2	0	—		2	0	31	0
Real Salt Lake	2025	MLS	31	0	—		1	1	1	0	2	0	35	1
Real Salt Lake	Total		272	13	8	0	13	1	2	0	9	0	304	14
Real Monarchs (loan)	2015	USL Championship	7	1	0	0	—		—		—		7	1
Real Monarchs (loan)	2016	USL Championship	1	0	—		—		—		—		1	0
Real Monarchs (loan)	2019	USL Championship	1	0	—		—		—		0	0	1	0
Career total			281	14	8	0	13	1	2	0	9	0	313	15

== Honors ==
United States U20

- CONCACAF Under-20 Championship: 2017

Individual

- CONCACAF U-20 Championship Best XI: 2017
- MLS All-Star: 2024
