= 2022 Real Salt Lake season =

American soccer team season

Real Salt Lake
2022 season
- Head coach: Pablo Mastroeni
- Stadium: America First Field (Note: America First Field was referred to by its former name, Rio Tinto Stadium, until September 10, 2022.)
- Major League Soccer: Conference: 7th Overall: 14th
- MLS Cup Playoffs: First round
- U.S. Open Cup: 3rd Round
- Rocky Mountain Cup: Winner
- Top goalscorer: League: All: Sergio Córdova (11 goals)
- Highest home attendance: 21,810 (Aug 6 vs LAFC)
- Lowest home attendance: 20,017 (Mar 5 vs SEA)
- Average home league attendance: 20,470
- Biggest win: RSL 3–0 HOU (5/28); RSL 3–0 MIN (8/31)
- Biggest defeat: NYC 6–0 RSL (4/17)
Home colors	Away colors

The 2022 Real Salt Lake season was the team's 18th year of existence, and their 18th consecutive season in Major League Soccer, the top division of the American soccer pyramid. On December 13, 2021, RSL hired Pablo Mastroeni to be the sixth manager in club history, removing the interim tag he had held since taking over for Freddy Juarez on August 27, 2021.

== Competitions ==
=== Preseason ===
The club's preseason schedule was announced on January 9, 2022. Originally, the club would have attended the 2022 Desert Showcase match with Seattle Sounders FC, however, the club opted out from the event due to scheduling conflicts and technical considerations. Real Salt Talk was replaced with Sounders' rival, the Portland Timbers for that match The club however, would still train in Tucson.

January 29	Real Salt Lake	n/a	Grand Canyon University	Tucson, Arizona
11:30 AM MT				Stadium: Kino Sports Complex
Note: Result not made public.

February 2	Real Salt Lake	1–1	Houston Dynamo FC	Tucson, Arizona
11:00 AM MT	(2nd half)	Report	Picault (1st half)	Stadium: Kino Sports Complex

February 9	Real Salt Lake	8–1	Utah Valley University	Herriman, Utah
11:00 AM MT	Wood; Menéndez; Löffelsend; Mondi; Garcia	Report	Bellini	Attendance: closed door scrimmage

February 13	Real Salt Lake	1–4	Viking FK	Portland, Oregon
3:30 PM MT	Kreilach 46'	Report	Sandberg 9'; Karban 48', 60'; Løkberg 68'	Stadium: Providence Park; Attendance: 0

February 16	Real Salt Lake	0–0	Minnesota United FC	Portland, Oregon
6:00 PM MT		Report		Stadium: Providence Park

February 19	Real Salt Lake	0–3	Portland Timbers	Portland, Oregon
6:00 PM MT		Report	Paredes 72'; Niezgoda 74' (pen.); Tuiloma 90+2'	Stadium: Providence Park; Attendance: 10,123

=== MLS regular season ===
February 27 1	Houston Dynamo	0–0	Real Salt Lake	Houston, Texas
5:00 PM MT	Steres (yellow card) 12'; Vera (yellow card) 34'; Carrasquilla (yellow card) 53'; Picault (yellow card) 90+4'	Report	Ruíz (yellow card) 17'; Caldwell (yellow card) 24'; Holt (yellow card) 59'	Stadium: PNC Stadium; Attendance: 18,561; Referee: Ramy Touchan

March 5 2	Real Salt Lake	1–0	Seattle Sounders FC	Sandy, Utah
6:00 PM MT	Wood 46'; Caldwell (yellow card) 70'; Löeffelsend (yellow card) 90+'	Report	Rusnák (yellow card) 48'; Rowe (yellow card) 73'	Stadium: Rio Tinto Stadium; Attendance: 20,017; Referee: Nima Saghafi

March 12 3	New England Revolution	2–3	Real Salt Lake	Foxborough, Massachusetts
5:30 PM MT	Traustason (yellow card) 5'; Kaptoum (yellow card) 16'; Boateng 45+'; Altidore 62'; Gil (yellow card) 88'	Report	Ruíz (yellow card) 35'; Caldwell (yellow card) 66'; Córdova 78'; Glad 88'; Schmitt 90+'	Stadium: Gillette Stadium; Attendance: 10,633; Referee: Drew Fischer

March 19 4	Real Salt Lake	2–1	Nashville SC	Sandy, Utah
7:30 PM MT	Wood 2'; Schmitt (yellow card) 24' (goal) 54'	Report	Zimmerman 25', (yellow card) 53'; Lovitz (yellow card) 41'; McCarty (yellow card) 90+3', (red card) 90+6'	Stadium: Rio Tinto Stadium; Attendance: 20,036; Referee: Tori Penso
Note: The red card given to Dax McCarty was a straight red card rather than a second yellow card

March 26 5	Sporting Kansas City	1–0	Real Salt Lake	Kansas City, Kansas
6:00 PM MT	Espinoza (yellow card) 40'; Sweat (yellow card) 45+'; Walter (yellow card) 51'; Russell 81'; Duke (yellow card) 90+'	Report	Löeffelsend (yellow card) 7'; Brody (yellow card) 29'	Stadium: Children's Mercy Park; Attendance: 19,107; Referee: Joseph Dickerson

April 2 6 RMC	Colorado Rapids	1–1	Real Salt Lake	Commerce City, Colorado
7:00 PM MT	Wilson (yellow card) 26'; Abubakar 56'	Report	Ruíz (penalty scored) 45'; Silva (yellow card) 74'; Schmitt (yellow card) 90'	Stadium: Dick's Sporting Goods Park; Attendance: 13,380; Referee: Ted Unkel

April 9 7	Real Salt Lake	2–2	Toronto FC	Sandy, Utah
6:00 PM MT	Meram 7'; Kreilach 43', (yellow card) 58'; Ruíz (yellow card) 47'; Herrera (yellow card) 83'	Report	Thompson 8'; MacNaughton (yellow card) 36'; Nelson 79'; Osorio (yellow card) 83'; Salcedo (red card) 86'	Stadium: Rio Tinto Stadium; Attendance: 20,136; Referee: Marcos de Oliveira

April 17 8	New York City FC	6–0	Real Salt Lake	New York, New York
11:00 AM MT	Castellanos 9', (yellow card) 34', (penalty scored) 40', (penalty scored) 57', 80'; Andrade 15', 55'; Gray (yellow card) 31'	Report	Schmitt (yellow card) 38'; Herrera (yellow card) 42'; Caldwell (yellow card) 63'	Stadium: Yankee Stadium; Attendance: 14,513; Referee: Ismail Elfath

April 23 9	Portland Timbers	0–0	Real Salt Lake	Portland, Oregon
8:00 PM MT	Bravo (yellow card) 77'; Mabiala (yellow card) 86'; Paredes (yellow card) 90+'	Report		Stadium: Providence Park; Attendance: 24,206; Referee: Chris Penso

April 30 10	Real Salt Lake	1–0	LA Galaxy	Sandy, Utah
1:30 PM MT	Córdova (yellow card) 42'; Silva 49', (yellow card) 50'	Report		Stadium: Rio Tinto Stadium; Attendance: 20,775; Referee: Chris Penso

May 8 11	Nashville SC	2–0	Real Salt Lake	Nashville, Tennessee
3:00 PM MT	Romney 63'; Sapong 90+'	Report	Luiz (yellow card) 20'; Ruiz (yellow card) 49'	Stadium: Geodis Park; Attendance: 28,226; Referee: Fotis Bazakos

May 14 12	Real Salt Lake	2–1	Austin FC	Sandy, Utah
7:30 PM MT	Chang 55'; Silva (yellow card) 63'; Brody 88'; Caldwell (yellow card) 90+2'	Report	Ring 24'; Driussi (yellow card) 38'; Pereira (red card) 45+2'; Urruti (yellow card) 65'; Valencia (yellow card) 78'	Stadium: Rio Tinto Stadium; Attendance: 20,122; Referee: Lucasz Szpala

May 22 13	CF Montreal	1–2	Real Salt Lake	Montreal, Canada
2:00 PM MT	Mihailovic 1'; Piette (yellow card) 71'	Report	Glad 54', (yellow card) 75'; Córdova 66'; Luiz (yellow card) 90'	Stadium: Saputo Stadium; Attendance: 14,205; Referee: Ramy Touchan

May 28 14	Real Salt Lake	3–0	Houston Dynamo FC	Sandy, Utah
7:30 PM MT	Wood 29'; Córdova 57'; MacMath (yellow card) 79'; Glad 90+2'	Report	Avila (yellow card) 15'; Carrasquilla (yellow card) 25'	Stadium: Rio Tinto Stadium; Attendance: 20,489; Referee: Armando Villarreal

June 4 15	Vancouver Whitecaps FC	2–1	Real Salt Lake	Vancouver, Canada
5:00 PM MT	Veselinović 31'; Caicedo (yellow card) 38'; Jungwirth (yellow card) 76'; Alexandre (yellow card) 90'; Gauld (penalty scored) 90+'	Report	Herrera (yellow card) 28' (yellow-red card) 90+'; Meram 52', (yellow card) 62'; Löffelsend (yellow card) 68'	Stadium: BC Place; Attendance: 17,134; Referee: Jon Freemon

June 18 16	Real Salt Lake	2–0	San Jose Earthquakes	Sandy, Utah
7:30 PM MT	Silva 22'; Schmitt (yellow card) 31'; Savarino 81'; Luiz (yellow card) 84'	Report	Espinoza (yellow card) 68'; Nathan (yellow card) 79'	Stadium: Rio Tinto Stadium; Attendance: 20,517; Referee: Alex Chilowicz

June 25 17	Real Salt Lake	0–0	Columbus Crew SC	Sandy, Utah
8:00 PM MT	Silva (yellow card) 45+3'	Report	Moreira (yellow card) 79'	Stadium: Rio Tinto Stadium; Attendance: 20,311; Referee: Mark Allatin

July 3 18	Minnesota United FC	3–2	Real Salt Lake	St. Paul, Minnesota
6:00 PM MT	Reynoso 9', (penalty missed) 45+3', 45+3'; Boxall (yellow card) 15'; Amarilla 61'	Report	Ruiz (yellow card) 33'; Herrera (yellow card) 37'; Savarino 71'; Julio 76'	Stadium: Allianz Field; Referee: Ramy Touchan

July 9 19 RMC	Real Salt Lake	2–2	Colorado Rapids	Sandy, Utah
8:00 PM MT	MacMath (yellow card) 38'; Ruiz (yellow card) 47'; Savarino 45+3'; Meram 51', (yellow card) 86'; Besler (yellow card) 90+1'	Report	Wilson (yellow card) 33'; Acosta (yellow card) 50'; Rubio 67' (pen.); Max (yellow card) 79'; Abubakar 89'	Stadium: Rio Tinto Stadium; Attendance: 20,242; Referee: Lukasz Szpala

July 13 20	Atlanta United FC	2–1	Real Salt Lake	Atlanta, Georgia
5:30 PM MT	Cisneros 7', 33'; Moreno (yellow card) 90+3'	Report	Kappelhof 37'; Holt (yellow card) 44'; Besler (yellow card) 56'	Stadium: Mercedes-Benz Stadium; Attendance: 42,509; Referee: Drew Fischer

July 17 21	Real Salt Lake	3–0	Sporting Kansas City	Sandy, Utah
7:30 PM MT	Glad (yellow card) 34'; Córdova 50' (yellow card) 50'; Ruiz 64'; Savarino 71'; Julio (yellow card) 90+3'	Report	Espinoza (yellow card) 24' (red card) 62'; Isimat-Mirin (yellow card) 85'	Stadium: Rio Tinto Stadium; Attendance: 20,132; Referee: Joseph Dickerson
Note: The red card issued to Roger Espinoza in the 62nd minute was a straight red card for a serious foul rather than a second yellow card

July 23 22	Real Salt Lake	0–1	FC Dallas	Sandy, Utah
8:00 PM MT	Ruiz (yellow card) 40'; Löffelsend (yellow card) 86'; Meram (yellow card) 86'; Glad (yellow card) 89'	Report	Ferreira 14', (yellow card) 88'; Velasco (yellow card) 22'; Obrian (yellow card) 85'; Cerrillo (yellow card) 90+3'; Paes (yellow card) 90+6'	Stadium: Rio Tinto Stadium; Attendance: 20,437; Referee: Matthew Conger

July 30 23	San Jose Earthquakes	2–2	Real Salt Lake	San Jose, California
8:00 PM MDT	Espinoza 12' (pen.), (yellow card) 45+2'; Ebobisse 62'; Yueill (yellow card) 85'; Greguš (yellow card) 90+4'; M. López (yellow card) 90+7' (yellow-red card) 90+7'	Report	Glad (yellow card) 12'; MacMath (yellow card) 14'; Löffelsend 21'; Chang (yellow card) 37'; Savarino 90+5', (yellow card) 90+6'	Stadium: PayPal Park; Attendance: 12,411; Referee: Nima Saghafi

August 6 24	Real Salt Lake	1–4	Los Angeles FC	Sandy, Utah
8:00 PM MT	Córdova 12'	Report	Arango 9', 60'; Acosta 17', (yellow card) 40'; Chiellini (yellow card) 69'; Bale 87'	Stadium: Rio Tinto Stadium; Attendance: 21,810; Referee: Victor Rivas

August 14 25	Seattle Sounders FC	1–2	Real Salt Lake	Seattle, Washington
8:00 PM MDT	Yeimar (yellow card) 59'; Rusnák 62'; C. Roldan (yellow card) 70'	Report	Córdova 32'; Brody 64'; Chang (yellow card) 66'; Ruiz (yellow card) 90'	Stadium: Lumen Field; Attendance: 33,093; Referee: Timothy Ford

August 20 26	Real Salt Lake	1–1	Vancouver Whitecaps FC	Sandy, Utah
8:00 PM MDT	Löeffelsend (yellow card) 12'; Córdova 61'	Report	Teibert (yellow card) 18'; Gressel 87'; Berhalter (yellow card) 90+2'	Stadium: Rio Tinto Stadium; Attendance: 20,567; Referee: Ismir Pekmic

August 27 27	FC Dallas	1–1	Real Salt Lake	Frisco, Texas
7:00 PM MT	Velasco 7', (yellow card) 56'	Report	Löffelsend (yellow card) 36'; Chang (yellow card) 45'; Julio 69'	Stadium: Toyota Stadium; Attendance: 15,573; Referee: Ramy Touchan

August 31 28	Real Salt Lake	3–0	Minnesota United FC	Sandy, Utah
7:30 PM MT	Córdova 7'; Löffelsend (yellow card) 20'; Savarino 23'; Glad (yellow card) 39'; Julio 79'	Report	Benítez (yellow card) 32'	Stadium: Rio Tinto Stadium; Attendance: 20,358; Referee: Drew Fischer

September 4 29	Los Angeles FC	2–0	Real Salt Lake	Los Angeles, California
8:30 PM MT	Hollingshead 49'; Arango 68'; Murillo (yellow card) 72'; Cifuentes (yellow card) 90+'; Palacios (yellow card) 90+'	Report	Meram (yellow card) 90+'	Stadium: Banc of California Stadium; Attendance: 22,199; Referee: Lukasz Szpala

September 10 30	Real Salt Lake	0–0	D.C. United	Sandy, Utah
7:30 PM MT	Silva (yellow card) 66'; Herrera (yellow card) 89'	Report	Durkin (yellow card) 27'; Akinmboni (yellow card) 40'; Ochoa (yellow card) 61'	Stadium: America First Field; Attendance: 20,487; Referee: Kevin Broadley

September 14 31	Austin FC	3–0	Real Salt Lake	Austin, Texas
	Djitté 60', 76', 80'	Report		Stadium: Q2 Stadium; Attendance: 20,738; Referee: Joseph Dickerson

September 17 32	Real Salt Lake	1–2	FC Cincinnati	Sandy, Utah
7:30 PM MT	Chang 35'; Savarino (yellow card) 61'	Report	Hagglund (yellow card) 33'; Brenner 44', 76'	Stadium: America First Field; Attendance: 20,222; Referee: Chris Penso

October 1 33	LA Galaxy	1–1	Real Salt Lake	Carson, California
8:30 PM MT	Chicharito (yellow card) 45+'; Costa (penalty scored) 68'; Cáceres (yellow card) 90+'	Report	Córdova 25'; Luna (yellow card) 90'	Stadium: Dignity Health Sports Park; Attendance: 26,674; Referee: Kevin Stott

October 9 34	Real Salt Lake	3–1	Portland Timbers	Sandy, Utah
3:00 PM MT	Savarino 19'; Rubin 48', (yellow card) 67'; Hidalgo 82'	Report	Ayala (yellow card) 27'; Asprilla 87'; Blanco (yellow card) 88'	Stadium: America First Field; Attendance: 21,333; Referee: Armando Villarreal

==== Standings ====
===== Western Conference Table =====
Pos	Team	Pld	W	L	T	GF	GA	GD	Pts	Qualification
1	Los Angeles FC	34	21	9	4	66	38	+28	67	Qualification for the conference semifinals and the CONCACAF Champions League
2	Austin FC	34	16	10	8	65	49	+16	56	Qualification for the first round and the CONCACAF Champions League
3	FC Dallas	34	14	9	11	48	37	+11	53	Qualification for the first round
4	LA Galaxy	34	14	12	8	58	51	+7	50	Qualification for the first round
5	Nashville SC	34	13	10	11	52	41	+11	50	Qualification for the first round
6	Minnesota United FC	34	14	14	6	48	51	−3	48	Qualification for the first round
7	Real Salt Lake	34	12	11	11	43	45	−2	47	Qualification for the first round
8	Portland Timbers	34	11	10	13	53	53	0	46	
9	Vancouver Whitecaps FC (Note: Canadian clubs could not qualify for the 2023 CONCACAF Champions League through the MLS regular season or playoffs.)	34	12	15	7	40	57	−17	43	Qualification for the CONCACAF Champions League (Note: as 2022 Canadian Championship winners.)
10	Colorado Rapids	34	11	13	10	46	57	−11	43	
11	Seattle Sounders FC	34	12	17	5	47	46	+1	41	
12	Sporting Kansas City	34	11	16	7	42	54	−12	40	
13	Houston Dynamo FC	34	10	18	6	43	56	−13	36	
14	San Jose Earthquakes	34	8	15	11	52	69	−17	35	

Source: MLS
Rules for classification: 1) points; 2) total wins; 3) total goal differential; 4) total goals scored; 5) fewer disciplinary points; 6) away goal differential; 7) away goals scored; 8) home goals differential; 9) home goals scored; 10) coin toss (2 clubs tied) or drawing of lots (≥3 clubs tied)

===== Overall table =====
Pos	Team	Pld	W	L	T	GF	GA	GD	Pts	
12	Inter Miami CF	34	14	14	6	47	56	−9	48	
13	Orlando City SC (U)	34	14	14	6	44	53	−9	48	Qualification for the CONCACAF Champions League (Note: As 2022 U.S. Open Cup champions (USA4))
14	Real Salt Lake	34	12	11	11	43	45	−2	47	
15	Portland Timbers	34	11	10	13	53	53	0	46	
16	Columbus Crew	34	10	8	16	46	41	+5	46	

Source: MLS
Rules for classification: 1) points; 2) total wins; 3) total goal differential; 4) total goals scored; 5) fewer disciplinary points; 6) away goal differential; 7) away goals scored; 8) home goals differential; 9) home goals scored; 10) coin toss (2 clubs tied) or drawing of lots (≥3 clubs tied)
(U) U.S. Open Cup winners

==== Results summary ====
Overall								Home						Away					
Pld	Pts	W	L	T	GF	GA	GD	W	L	T	GF	GA	GD	W	L	T	GF	GA	GD
34	47	12	11	11	43	45	−2	9	3	5	27	15	+12	3	8	6	16	30	−14

Last updated: October 10, 2022
Source: MLS Results
Pld = Matches played; Pts = Points; W = Matches won; T = Matches tied; L = Matches lost; GF = Goals for; GA = Goals against; GD = Goal difference

=== MLS Cup Playoffs ===
October 16 First round	Austin FC (2)	2–2 (a.e.t.) (3–1 p)	(7) Real Salt Lake	Austin, Texas
1:00 PM MT	Driussi 31', (penalty scored) 90+'; Ring (yellow card) 41'	Report	Córdova 3', (penalty scored) 15'; Rubin (yellow card) 17' (yellow-red card) 52'; Glad (yellow card) 45+'; Caldwell (yellow card) 90+'	Stadium: Q2 Stadium; Attendance: 20,738; Referee: Victor Rivas
	Penalties
	Driussi (penalty scored); Fagúndez (penalty scored); Rigoni (penalty scored)		(penalty scored) Silva; (penalty missed) Brody; (penalty missed) Ojeda; (penalty missed) Schmitt
Note: Austin FC advanced on penalties 3–1

=== U.S. Open Cup ===
April 20 3R	Real Salt Lake (Utah)	0–1	Northern Colorado Hailstorm FC	Sandy, Utah
7:30 PM MDT	Pierre (yellow card) 69'	Report	Ulysse (yellow card) 25'; Nortey (yellow card) 50'; Evans (yellow card) 53'; Cornwall (yellow card) 58', (goal) 70'; Robles (yellow card) 90+'; Olsen (yellow card) 90+'	Stadium: Rio Tinto Stadium; Attendance: 19,301; Referee: Brad Jensen

=== Leagues Cup ===
September 22 Showcase Match	Real Salt Lake (United States)	1–2	(Mexico) Atlas	Sandy, Utah
8:00 PM MDT	Herrera 17'; Meram (red card) 36'; Gomez (yellow card) 52'; Caldwell (yellow card) 84'; Nigro (yellow card) 88'	Report	Zaldívar 41', (yellow card) 64'; Aguirre (yellow card) 48'; Rodríguez 71'; Reyes (yellow card) 78'; Ortega (yellow card) 90+3'	Stadium: America First Field; Attendance: 8,322; Referee: Joseph Dickerson (United States)

== Stats ==
=== Squad appearances ===
As of October 16, 2022

No	Pos	Nat	Player	Total		Major League Soccer		US Open Cup		Playoffs	
No	Pos	Nat	Player	Apps	Starts	Apps	Starts	Apps	Starts	Apps	Starts
Goalkeepers
18	GK	(United States)	Zac MacMath	35	35	34	34	0	0	1	1
24	GK	(United States)	Jeff Dewsnup	0	0	0	0	0	0	0	0
35	GK	(United States)	Gavin Beavers	0	0	0	0	0	0	0	0
81	GK	(United States)	Tomas Gomez	0	0	0	0	0	0	0	0
Defenders
2	DF	(United States)	Andrew Brody	35	34	34	33	0	0	1	1
4	DF	(Netherlands)	Johan Kappelhof	6	6	6	6	0	0	0	0
15	DF	(United States)	Justen Glad	28	28	27	27	1	1	1	1
20	DF	(United States)	Erik Holt	10	6	10	6	0	0	0	0
22	DF	(United States)	Aaron Herrera	27	25	27	25	0	0	0	0
23	DF	(United States)	Bret Halsey	0	0	0	0	0	0	0	0
30	DF	(Uruguay)	Marcelo Silva	32	32	31	31	0	0	1	1
32	DF	(United States)	Zack Farnsworth	0	0	0	0	0	0	0	0
36	DF	(Costa Rica)	Bryan Oviedo	7	5	6	4	0	0	1	1
99	DF	(Mexico)	Jaziel Orozco	5	3	4	3	1	0	0	0
Midfielders
6	MF	(Argentina)	Pablo Ruíz	31	29	29	28	1	0	1	1
8	MF	(Croatia)	Damir Kreilach	5	3	5	3	0	0	0	0
12	MF	(United States)	Scott Caldwell	28	15	26	15	1	0	1	0
13	MF	(United States)	Nick Besler	13	3	11	2	1	1	1	0
16	MF	(Cuba)	Maikel Chang	35	25	33	24	1	0	1	1
19	MF	(United States)	Bode Hidalgo	8	1	6	0	1	1	1	0
26	MF	(United States)	Diego Luna	13	3	13	3	0	0	0	0
28	MF	(Germany)	Jasper Löffelsend	32	20	30	19	1	1	1	0
33	MF	(United States)	Julio Benitez	0	0	0	0	0	0	0	0
38	MF	(United States)	Jude Wellings	0	0	0	0	0	0	0	0
88	MF	(Paraguay)	Braian Ojeda	7	4	6	3	0	0	1	1
Forwards
7	FW	(United States)	Bobby Wood	14	13	14	13	0	0	0	0
9	FW	(Iraq)	Justin Meram	32	26	32	26	0	0	0	0
10	FW	(Venezuela)	Sergio Córdova	35	28	33	27	1	0	1	1
11	FW	(Venezuela)	Jefferson Savarino	20	18	19	17	0	0	1	1
14	FW	(Guatemala)	Rubio Rubin	25	9	23	7	1	1	1	1
21	FW	(United States)	Tate Schmitt	16	11	14	10	1	1	1	0
29	FW	(Ecuador)	Anderson Julio	20	3	20	3	0	0	0	0
31	FW	(Ivory Coast)	Axel Kei	0	0	0	0	0	0	0	0
39	FW	(United States)	Danny Musovski	3	0	3	0	0	0	0	0
Other players (Departed during season, short-term loan, etc.)
1	GK	(Mexico)	David Ochoa	1	1	0	0	1	1	0	0
3	DF	(Switzerland)	Chris Kablan	2	0	2	0	0	0	0	0
17	FW	(United States)	Chris Garcia	3	1	2	0	1	1	0	0
25	MF	(Brazil)	Everton Luiz	13	5	12	4	1	1	0	0
27	FW	(Argentina)	Jonathan Menéndez	4	1	4	1	0	0	0	0
42	MF	(United States)	Pierre Reedy	2	1	1	0	1	1	0	0
49	DF	(United States)	Bobby Pierre	1	1	0	0	1	1	0	0

=== Goals ===
- Stats from MLS Regular season, MLS play offs, CONCACAF Champions league, and U.S. Open Cup are all included.
- First tie-breaker for goals is assists.

As of October 16, 2022

Goals
Rank	Player	Nation	Goals	Assists
1	Sergio Córdova	(Venezuela)	11	2
2	Jefferson Savarino	(Venezuela)	7	6
3	Justin Meram	(Iraq)	3	7
3	Anderson Julio	(Ecuador)	3	2
3	Bobby Wood	(United States)	3	1
3	Justen Glad	(United States)	3	0
7	Andrew Brody	(United States)	2	7
7	Maikel Chang	(Cuba)	2	6
7	Pablo Ruíz	(Argentina)	2	6
7	Tate Schmitt	(United States)	2	0
7	Marcelo Silva	(Uruguay)	2	0
12	Jasper Löffelsend	(Germany)	1	5
12	Bode Hidalgo	(United States)	1	0
12	Johan Kappelhof	(Netherlands)	1	0
12	Damir Kreilach	(Croatia)	1	0
12	Rubio Rubin	(Guatemala)	1	0

=== Assists ===
- Stats from MLS Regular season, MLS play offs, CONCACAF Champions league, and U.S. Open Cup are all included.
- First tie-breaker for assists is minutes played.

As of October 16, 2022

Assists
Rank	Player	Nation	Assists	Matches Played	Minutes played
1	Justin Meram	(Iraq)	7	33	2289
1	Andrew Brody	(United States)	7	35	3080
3	Jefferson Savarino	(Venezuela)	6	20	1599
3	Maikel Chang	(Cuba)	6	34	1909
3	Pablo Ruíz	(Argentina)	6	30	2503
6	Jasper Löffelsend	(Germany)	5	31	1691
7	Aaron Herrera	(United States)	3	27	2267
8	Bryan Oviedo	(Costa Rica)	2	7	434
8	Anderson Julio	(Ecuador)	2	20	512
8	Sergio Córdova	(Venezuela)	2	34	2348
11	Bobby Wood	(United States)	1	14	989

=== Shutouts ===
- Stats from MLS Regular season, MLS play offs, CONCACAF Champions league, and U.S. Open Cup are all included.
- First tie-breaker for shutouts is minutes played.

As of October 11, 2022

Shutouts
Rank	Player	Nation	Shutouts	Matches Played	Minutes played
1	Zac MacMath	(United States)	10	35	3180

== Club ==
=== Roster ===
As of September 1, 2022,

No.	Name	Nationality	Positions	Date of birth (age)	Signed from	Seasons with club (year signed)
2	Andrew Brody	United States	DF	May 3, 1995 (age 31)	(United States) Real Monarchs	2 (2021)
4	Johan Kappelhof	Netherlands	DF	August 5, 1990 (age 36)	(United States) Chicago Fire FC	1 (2022)
6	Pablo Ruíz	Argentina	MF	December 20, 1998 (age 27)	(Chile) San Luis	5 (2018)
7	Bobby Wood	United States	FW	November 15, 1992 (age 33)	(Germany) Hamburger SV	2 (2021)
8	Damir Kreilach (DP)	Croatia	MF	April 16, 1989 (age 37)	(Germany) Union Berlin	5 (2018)
9	Justin Meram	Iraq	MF	December 4, 1988 (age 37)	(United States) Atlanta United FC	3 (2020)
10	Sergio Córdova (DP)	Venezuela	FW	August 9, 1997 (age 29)	(Germany) FC Augsburg (loan)	1 (2022)
11	Jefferson Savarino (DP)	Venezuela	FW	November 11, 1996 (age 29)	(Brazil) Atletico Mineiro	4 (2017, 2022)
12	Scott Caldwell	United States	MF	March 15, 1991 (age 35)	(United States) New England Revolution	1 (2022)
13	Nick Besler	United States	MF	May 7, 1993 (age 33)	(United States) Real Monarchs	6 (2017)
14	Rubio Rubin	Guatemala	FW	March 1, 1996 (age 30)	(United States) San Diego Loyal SC	2 (2021)
15	Justen Glad (HGP)	United States	DF	February 28, 1997 (age 29)	(United States) Real Salt Lake Academy (HGP)	9 (2014)
16	Maikel Chang	Cuba	MF	April 18, 1991 (age 35)	(United States) Real Monarchs	3 (2020)
18	Zac MacMath	United States	GK	August 7, 1991 (age 35)	(Canada) Vancouver Whitecaps FC	3 (2020)
19	Bode Hidalgo	United States	FW	February 22, 2002 (age 24)	(United States) Real Monarchs	2 (2021)
20	Erik Holt (HGP)	United States	DF	September 6, 1996 (age 30)	(United States) Real Salt Lake Academy (HGP)	4 (2019)
21	Tate Schmitt (HGP)	United States	FW	May 28, 1997 (age 29)	(United States) Real Salt Lake Academy (HGP)	4 (2019)
22	Aaron Herrera (HGP)	United States	DF	June 6, 1997 (age 29)	(United States) Real Salt Lake Academy (HGP)	5 (2018)
23	Bret Halsey (GA)	United States	DF	June 1, 2000 (age 26)	(United States) Virginia Cavaliers	2 (2021)
24	Jeff Dewsnup (HGP)	United States	GK	May 21, 2004 (age 22)	(United States) Real Salt Lake Academy (HGP)	2 (2021)
26	Diego Luna	United States	MF	September 3, 2003 (age 23)	(United States) El Paso Locomotive	1 (2022)
28	Jasper Löeffelsend	Germany	DF	September 10, 1997 (age 29)	(United States) Pittsburgh Panthers	1 (2022)
29	Anderson Julio	Ecuador	FW	May 31, 1996 (age 30)	(Mexico) Atlético San Luis	2 (2021)
30	Marcelo Silva	Uruguay	DF	March 21, 1989 (age 37)	(Spain) Real Zaragoza	6 (2017)
31	Axel Kei (HGP)	Ivory Coast	FW	December 30, 2007 (age 18)	(United States) Real Salt Lake Academy (HGP)	1 (2022)
32	Zack Farnsworth (HGP)	United States	DF	July 13, 2002 (age 24)	(United States) Real Salt Lake Academy (HGP)	2 (2021)
33	Julio Benitez (HGP)	United States	MF	July 30, 2005 (age 21)	(United States) Real Monarchs (HGP)	1 (2022)
35	Gavin Beavers (HGP)	United States	GK	April 29, 2005 (age 21)	(United States) Real Monarchs (HGP)	1 (2022)
36	Bryan Oviedo	Costa Rica	DF	February 18, 1990 (age 36)	(Denmark) FC Copenhagen	1 (2022)
38	Jude Wellings (HGP)	United States	MF	April 26, 2006 (age 20)	(United States) Real Monarchs (HGP)	1 (2022)
39	Danny Musovski	United States	FW	November 30, 1995 (age 30)	(United States) Los Angeles FC	1 (2022)
81	Tomas Gomez	United States	GK	May 20, 1993 (age 33)	(United States) Real Monarchs	1 (2022)
88	Braian Ojeda	Paraguay	MF	June 27, 2000 (age 26)	(England) Nottingham Forest (loan)	1 (2022)
99	Jaziel Orozco (HGP)	Mexico	DF	June 2, 2004 (age 22)	(United States) Real Monarchs (HGP)	1 (2022)

=== Transfers ===
As of September 1, 2022'

==== In ====
Player	Position	Previous club	Fees/Notes	Date	Ref.
(United States) Jude Wellings	MF	(United States) RSL Academy	Homegrown player	January 10, 2022	
(United States) Julio Benitez	MF	(United States) Real Monarchs	Homegrown player	January 11, 2022	
(United States) Scott Caldwell	MF	(United States) New England Revolution	Free agency	January 12, 2022	
(United States) Gavin Beavers	GK	(United States) Real Monarchs	Homegrown player	January 12, 2022	
(Mexico) Jaziel Orozco	DF	(United States) Real Monarchs	Homegrown player	January 13, 2022	
(Ivory Coast) Axel Kei	FW	(United States) RSL Academy	Homegrown player	January 14, 2022	
(Netherlands) Johan Kappelhof	DF	(United States) Chicago Fire FC	Free agency	February 18, 2022	
(Germany) Jasper Löeffelsend	DF	(United States) Pittsburgh Panthers	2022 MLS SuperDraft	February 27, 2022	
(United States) Tomas Gomez	GK	(United States) Sacramento Republic	Short-term deal	February 27, 2022	
(Ecuador) Anderson Julio	FW	(Mexico) Atlético San Luis	Undisclosed; follows loan in 2021 season.	April 28, 2022	
(Venezuela) Jefferson Savarino	FW	(Brazil) Atletico Mineiro	Designated player	May 4, 2022	
(United States) Diego Luna	MF	(United States) El Paso Locomotive		June 2, 2022	
(United States) Danny Musovski	FW	(United States) Los Angeles FC	$250,000 GAM	August 3, 2022	
(Costa Rica) Bryan Oviedo	DF	(Denmark) FC Copenhagen	Free agency	August 4, 2022	

==== Out ====
Player	Position	Next Club	Fees/Notes	Date
(United States) Milan Iloski	FW	(United States) Orange County SC	Option Declined	December 6, 2021
(Honduras) Douglas Martínez	FW	(United States) Sacramento Republic	Option Declined	December 6, 2021
(Canada) Ashtone Morgan	DF	(Canada) Forge FC	Option Declined	December 6, 2021
(United States) Justin Portillo	MF	(United States) New Mexico United	Option Declined	December 6, 2021
(Trinidad and Tobago) Noah Powder	DF	(United States) Indy Eleven	Option Declined	December 6, 2021
(Venezuela) Jeizon Ramírez	FW	(Venezuela) Deportivo Táchira	Option Declined	December 6, 2021
(United States) Donny Toia	DF	(United States) FC Tucson	Option Declined	December 6, 2021
(Slovakia) Albert Rusnák	MF	(United States) Seattle Sounders FC	Free agency	January 13, 2022
(Croatia) Toni Datković	DF	(Spain) FC Cartagena	Undisclosed	January 18, 2022
(Brazil) Everton Luiz	MF	(Belgium) S.K. Beveren	Undisclosed	July 11, 2022
(Mexico) David Ochoa	GK	(United States) D.C. United	$75,000 GAM + conditional	July 30, 2022

=== Loans ===
==== In ====
Player	Position	Loaned from	Fees/Notes	Date
(Venezuela) Sergio Córdova	FW	(Germany) FC Augsburg	Loan for entire 2022 season	February 3, 2022
(United States) Bobby Pierre	DF	(United States) Real Monarchs	Extreme hardship (short-term loan)	March 31, 2022
(United States) Pierre Reedy	MF	(United States) Real Monarchs	Extreme hardship (short-term loan)	March 31, 2022
(Switzerland) Chris Kablan	DF	(Belgium) S.K. Beveren	Short-term loan	May 4, 2022
(Paraguay) Braian Ojeda	MF	(England) Nottingham Forest	One-year loan	August 4, 2022

==== Out ====
Player	Position	Loaned to	Fees/Notes	Date
(Argentina) Jonathan Menéndez	FW	(Argentina) Vélez Sarsfield	Loan for remainder of 2022 season	July 12, 2022
(United States) Chris Garcia	FW	(United States) El Paso Locomotive	Loan for remainder of 2022 season	September 1, 2022
