= 2023 Real Salt Lake season =

American soccer team season

Real Salt Lake
2023 season
- Head coach: Pablo Mastroeni
- Stadium: America First Field
- Major League Soccer: Conference: 5th Overall: 11th
- MLS Cup Playoffs: Round One
- Leagues Cup: Round of 16
- U.S. Open Cup: Semifinals
- Rocky Mountain Cup: Winner
- Average home league attendance: 19,429
Home colors	Away colors

The 2023 Real Salt Lake season was the team's 19th season in Major League Soccer, the top division of the American soccer pyramid. The team also competed in both the 2023 U.S. Open Cup and 2023 Leagues Cup. Real Salt Lake played their home games at America First Field in the Salt Lake City suburb of Sandy, and was managed by Pablo Mastroeni in his second full season with the club.

== Club ==
=== Roster ===
As of June 30, 2023,

No.	Name	Nationality	Positions	Date of birth (age)	Signed from	Seasons with club (year signed)
2	Andrew Brody	United States	DF	May 3, 1995 (age 31)	(United States) Real Monarchs	3 (2021)
3	Bryan Oviedo	Costa Rica	DF	February 18, 1990 (age 36)	(Denmark) FC Copenhagen	2 (2022)
4	Brayan Vera	Colombia	DF	January 15, 1999 (age 27)	(Colombia) América de Cali	1 (2023)
6	Braian Ojeda	Paraguay	MF	June 27, 2000 (age 26)	(England) Nottingham Forest (loan)	2 (2022)
7	Pablo Ruíz	Argentina	MF	December 20, 1998 (age 27)	(Chile) San Luis	6 (2018)
8	Damir Kreilach (DP)	Croatia	MF	April 16, 1989 (age 37)	(Germany) Union Berlin	6 (2018)
9	Chicho Arango (DP)	Colombia	FW	March 9, 1995 (age 31)	(Mexico) C.F. Pachuca	1 (2023)
10	Jefferson Savarino (DP)	Venezuela	FW	November 11, 1996 (age 29)	(Brazil) Atletico Mineiro	5 (2017, 2022)
11	Andrés Gómez	Colombia	FW	September 12, 2002 (age 23)	(Colombia) Millonarios F.C.	1 (2023)
12	Scott Caldwell	United States	MF	March 15, 1991 (age 35)	(United States) New England Revolution	2 (2022)
13	Nelson Palacio	Colombia	MF	June 16, 2001 (age 25)	(Colombia) Atlético Nacional	1 (2023)
14	Rubio Rubin	Guatemala	FW	March 1, 1996 (age 30)	(United States) San Diego Loyal SC	3 (2021)
15	Justen Glad (HGP)	United States	DF	February 28, 1997 (age 29)	(United States) Real Salt Lake Academy (HGP)	10 (2014)
16	Maikel Chang	Cuba	MF	April 18, 1991 (age 35)	(United States) Real Monarchs	4 (2020)
17	Danny Musovski	United States	FW	November 30, 1995 (age 30)	(United States) Los Angeles FC	2 (2022)
18	Zac MacMath	United States	GK	August 7, 1991 (age 34)	(Canada) Vancouver Whitecaps FC	4 (2020)
19	Bode Hidalgo	United States	FW	February 22, 2002 (age 24)	(United States) Real Monarchs	3 (2021)
20	Erik Holt (HGP)	United States	DF	September 6, 1996 (age 29)	(United States) Real Salt Lake Academy (HGP)	5 (2019)
22	Delentz Pierre (HGP)	Haiti	DF	December 16, 2000 (age 25)	(United States) Portland Pilots (HGP)	1 (2023)
23	Ilijah Paul (GA)	United States	FW	July 26, 2002 (age 24)	(United States) Washington Huskies	1 (2023)
24	Tomas Gomez	United States	GK	May 20, 1993 (age 33)	(United States) Real Monarchs	2 (2022)
25	Emeka Eneli	United States	MF	October 18, 1999 (age 26)	(United States) Cornell Big Red	1 (2023)
26	Diego Luna	United States	MF	September 3, 2003 (age 22)	(United States) El Paso Locomotive	2 (2022)
27	Bertin Jacquesson (GA)	France	FW	November 30, 2001 (age 24)	(United States) Pittsburgh Panthers	1 (2023)
28	Jasper Löeffelsend	Germany	DF	September 10, 1997 (age 28)	(United States) Pittsburgh Panthers	2 (2022)
29	Anderson Julio	Ecuador	FW	May 31, 1996 (age 30)	(Mexico) Atlético San Luis	3 (2021)
30	Marcelo Silva	Uruguay	DF	March 21, 1989 (age 37)	(Spain) Real Zaragoza	7 (2017)
31	Axel Kei (HGP)	Ivory Coast	FW	December 30, 2007 (age 18)	(United States) Real Salt Lake Academy (HGP)	2 (2022)
32	Zack Farnsworth (HGP)	United States	DF	July 13, 2002 (age 24)	(United States) Real Salt Lake Academy (HGP)	3 (2021)
33	Moses Nyeman	United States	MF	November 5, 2003 (age 22)	(Belgium) S.K. Beveren (loan)	1 (2023)
35	Gavin Beavers (HGP)	United States	GK	April 29, 2005 (age 21)	(United States) Real Monarchs (HGP)	2 (2022)
37	Luis Rivera (HGP)	United States	DF	December 1, 2007 (age 18)	(United States) Real Monarchs	1 (2023)
38	Jude Wellings (HGP)	United States	MF	April 26, 2006 (age 20)	(United States) Real Monarchs (HGP)	2 (2022)

=== Transfers ===
As of June 10, 2023'

==== In ====
Player	Position	Previous Club	Fees/Notes	Date	Ref.
(United States) Ilijah Paul	FW	(United States) Washington Huskies	2023 MLS SuperDraft; Generation adidas	December 21, 2022	
(France) Bertin Jacquesson	FW	(United States) Pittsburgh Panthers	2023 MLS SuperDraft; Generation adidas	December 21, 2022	
(United States) Luis Rivera	DF	(United States) Real Monarchs	Homegrown player	January 6, 2023	
(Haiti) Delentz Pierre	DF	(United States) Portland Pilots	Homegrown player	January 6, 2023	
(Colombia) Andrés Gómez	FW	(Colombia) Millonarios	Undisclosed	January 10, 2023	
(Colombia) Brayan Vera	DF	(Colombia) América de Cali	Undisclosed	February 10, 2023	
(United States) Emeka Eneli	MF	(United States) Cornell Big Red	2023 MLS SuperDraft	March 24, 2023	
(Colombia) Chicho Arango	FW	(Mexico) C.F. Pachuca	Designated Player	June 10, 2023	
(Colombia) Nelson Palacio	MF	(Colombia) Atlético Nacional	Undisclosed	June 28, 2023	

==== Out ====
Player	Position	Next Club	Fees/Notes	Date
(United States) Nick Besler	MF		Option Declined	October 26, 2022
(United States) Chris Garcia	FW	(United States) El Paso Locomotive	Option Declined	October 26, 2022
(United States) Bret Halsey	DF	(United States) FC Cincinnati 2	Option Declined	October 26, 2022
(Netherlands) Johan Kappelhof	DF	(Lebanon) Safa SC	Option Declined	October 26, 2022
(United States) Tate Schmitt	FW	(United States) Houston Dynamo	Option Declined	October 26, 2022
(United States) Bobby Wood	FW	(United States) New England Revolution	Option Declined	October 26, 2022
(United States) Aaron Herrera	DF	(Canada) CF Montréal	$500,000 GAM + additional	December 21, 2022
(Venezuela) Sergio Córdova	FW	(Germany) FC Augsburg	End of loan; returned to parent club	January 5, 2023
(United States) Jeff Dewsnup	GK	Retired		January 7, 2023
(Iraq) Justin Meram	FW	(United States) Charlotte FC	$200,000 GAM + additional	April 27, 2023
(Argentina) Jonathan Menéndez	FW	(Greece) Aris	Mutually Parted Ways	July 3, 2023

=== Loans ===
==== In ====
Player	Position	Loaned From	Fees/Notes	Date
(United States) Moses Nyeman	MF	(Belgium) S.K. Beveren	Loan for entire 2023 season	February 20, 2023

==== Out ====
Player	Position	Loaned To	Fees/Notes	Date
(Mexico) Jaziel Orozco	DF	(Mexico) Santos Laguna	Loan for entire 2023 season	February 2, 2023
(Argentina) Jonathan Menéndez	FW	(Argentina) Newell's Old Boys	Loan for entire 2023 season	February 6, 2023
(United States) Julio Benitez	MF	(United States) Forward Madison FC	Loan for entire 2023 season	February 14, 2023

== Competitions ==
=== Preseason ===
January 21	Real Salt Lake	2–0	Los Angeles FC	Los Angeles, California
12:00 pm MDT	Jaquesson 10'; Rubin 65' (pen.)	Report		Attendance: 0 (closed door)

February 8	Real Salt Lake	2–2	Sporting Kansas City	Phoenix, Arizona
TBD MDT	Kreilach 19'; Schmitt 43'	Report	Russell 8'; Agada 54'	Stadium: Phoenix Rising FC Soccer Complex; Attendance: 0 (closed door)

February 11 Desert Showcase	Real Salt Lake	1–1	Sacramento Republic FC	Tucson, Arizona
6:00 pm MDT	Pierre 7'	Report	Martinez 84'	Stadium: Kino Sports Complex

February 14 Desert Showcase	Real Salt Lake	5–0	El Paso Locomotive FC	Tucson, Arizona
TBD MDT	Ojeda 19'; Oviedo 23'; Gómez 68', 69'; Jacquesson 81'			Stadium: Kino Sports Complex; Attendance: 0 (closed door)

February 18 Desert Showcase	Real Salt Lake	3–0	Chicago Fire FC	Tucson, Arizona
11:00 am MDT	Ojeda 22'; Savarino 40', 44'	Report		Stadium: Kino Sports Complex

=== MLS regular season ===
==== Matches ====
February 25 1	Vancouver Whitecaps FC	1–2	Real Salt Lake	Vancouver, British Columbia
8:30 pm MT	Brown 24'	Report	Löffelsend (yellow card) 15'; Glad 70'; Kreilach 73'	Stadium: BC Place; Attendance: 19,614; Referee: Ismir Pekmic

March 4 2	Seattle Sounders FC	2–0	Real Salt Lake	Seattle, Washington
8:30 pm MT	Morris 35'; Héber 58'; Nouhou (yellow card) 73'; Léo Chú (yellow card) 86'	Report	Ojeda (yellow card) 62'	Stadium: Lumen Field; Attendance: 30,011; Referee: Victor Rivas

March 11 3	Real Salt Lake	1–2	Austin FC	Sandy, Utah
7:30 pm MT	Glad 22'; Kreilach (yellow card) 41'	Report	Gallagher 9'; Wolff 33'	Stadium: America First Field; Attendance: 20,052; Referee: Alex Chilowicz

March 25 4	Real Salt Lake	0–4	St. Louis City SC	Sandy, Utah
7:30 pm MT	Kreilach (yellow card) 24'; Eneli (yellow card) 68'; Glad (yellow card) 75'	Report	Gioacchini 47'; Bartlett (yellow card) 55'; Klauss 61', 66'; Alm 76', (yellow card) 85'	Stadium: America First Field; Attendance: 19,508; Referee: Mark Allatin

April 1 5	Columbus Crew	4–0	Real Salt Lake	Columbus, Ohio
5:30 pm MT	A. Morris 14', 53'; Zelarayán 41' (pen.); Nagbe (yellow card) 64'; Yeboah 90+3'	Report	Meram (yellow card) 29'; Eneli (yellow card) 84'	Stadium: Lower.com Field; Attendance: 19,624; Referee: Rubiel Vazquez

April 8 6	Real Salt Lake	3–1	Charlotte FC	Sandy, Utah
7:30 pm MT	Vera (yellow card) 23'; Ruiz 56', (yellow card) 57'; Julio 59'; Savarino 62'; Glad (yellow card) 70'	Report	Bender (yellow card) 13'; Świderski 27'; Afful (yellow card) 42'; Jóźwiak (yellow card) 48'	Stadium: America First Field; Attendance: 17,506; Referee: Fotis Bazakos

April 15 7	FC Dallas	2–1	Real Salt Lake	Frisco, Texas
6:30 pm MT	Ferreira 5'; Jesus (yellow card) 69'; Kamungo 88'; Ntsabeleng (yellow card) 90+3'	Report	Rubin (yellow card) 49'; Savarino 68'; Vera (yellow card) 74'	Stadium: Toyota Stadium; Attendance: 19,096; Referee: Sergii Boiko

April 22 8	Real Salt Lake	3–1	San Jose Earthquakes	Sandy, Utah
7:30 pm MT	Löffelsend 39'; Ruiz (yellow card) 45'; Savarino 54'; Gómez 80'	Report	Espinoza 49'	Stadium: America First Field; Attendance: 16,666; Referee: Filip Dujic

April 29 9	Real Salt Lake	0–0	Seattle Sounders FC	Sandy, Utah
7:30 pm MT	João Paulo (yellow card) 8'; A. Roldán (yellow card) 72'; Rusnák (yellow card) 90+4'	Report	Savarino (yellow card) 9'; Oviedo (yellow card) 36'; Glad (yellow card) 53'; Ruiz (yellow card) 62' (yellow-red card) 90+3'; Ojeda (yellow card) 69'	Stadium: America First Field; Attendance: 20,714; Referee: Nima Saghafi

May 6 10	Houston Dynamo FC	0–0	Real Salt Lake	Houston, Texas
6:30 pm MT	Escobar (yellow card) 57'; Quiñónes (yellow card) 90+'	Report	Glad (yellow card) 45'; Oviedo (yellow card) 83'	Stadium: Shell Energy Stadium; Attendance: 13,793; Referee: Lukasz Szpala

May 13 11	Real Salt Lake	0–3	Los Angeles FC	Sandy, Utah
7:30 pm MT	Ojeda (yellow card) 27'; Eneli (yellow card) 79'	Report	Opoku 8'; Bouanga 34'; Hollingshead (yellow card) 68'; Bogusz 87' (pen.)	Stadium: America First Field; Attendance: 19,407; Referee: Pierre-Luc Lauziere

May 17 12	Real Salt Lake	0–0	Portland Timbers	Sandy, Utah
7:30 pm MT	Eneli (yellow card) 45+1'	Report	Boli (yellow card) 72'	Stadium: America First Field; Attendance: 18,020; Referee: Ramy Touchan

May 20 13 RMC	Colorado Rapids	2–3	Real Salt Lake	Commerce City, Colorado
7:30 pm MT	Acosta (yellow card) 28'; Wilson 33'; Nicholson (yellow card) 45+'; Abubakar 74'; Cabral (yellow card) 77'	Report	Ruiz 12'; Musovski 21', (yellow card) 35'; Oviedo (yellow card) 32'; Kreilach 44'; Hidalgo (yellow card) 58'; Ojeda (yellow card) 62'; Vera (yellow card) 73'	Stadium: Dick's Sporting Goods Park; Attendance: 15,327; Referee: Jon Freemon

May 27 14	Minnesota United FC	1–1	Real Salt Lake	Saint Paul, Minnesota
6:30 pm MT	Amarilla (yellow card) 4'; Glad 31' (o.g.); Taylor (yellow card) 73'	Report	Savarino 28'; Glad (yellow card) 45+7'; Ojeda (yellow card) 59'; Rubin (yellow card) 71'	Stadium: Allianz Field; Attendance: 19,912; Referee: Rosendo Mendoza

May 31 15	Real Salt Lake	2–3	LA Galaxy	Sandy, Utah
7:30 pm MT	Musovski 51', (yellow card) 57'; Gómez (yellow card) 54'; Brody (yellow card) 64'; Ruiz 67', (yellow card) 83'	Report	Brugman 45+4' (pen.); Edwards (yellow card) 66'; Rodríguez 72'; Boyd 74'	Stadium: America First Field; Attendance: 17,762; Referee: Ismir Pekmic

June 3 16	Austin FC	1–2	Real Salt Lake	Austin, Texas
6:30 pm MT	Rigoni (yellow card) 43'; Urruti (yellow card) 62'; Gallagher (yellow card) 64'; Cascante (yellow card) 90+2'	Report	Hidalgo (yellow card) 7'; Rubín 15', 81'; Glad (yellow card) 34'; Löffelsend (yellow card) 66'	Stadium: Q2 Stadium; Attendance: 20,738; Referee: Tori Penso

June 10 17	Real Salt Lake	0–0	New York City FC	Sandy, Utah
7:30 pm MT	Glad (yellow card) 42'	Report	Pereira (yellow card) 32'; Haak (yellow card) 70'; Barraza (yellow card) 83'; Alfaro (yellow card) 84'	Stadium: America First Field; Attendance: 20,301; Referee: Fotis Bazakos

June 17 18	D.C. United	1–2	Real Salt Lake	Washington, D.C.
5:30 pm MT	Birnbaum (red card) 26'; Durkin (yellow card) 50', (goal) 53'; Dájome (yellow card) 75'; Hines-Ike (yellow card) 89'	Report	Ruiz (yellow card) 9', (goal) 41'; Musovski 51'; MacMath (yellow card) 90+1'	Stadium: Audi Field; Attendance: 19,215; Referee: Malik Badawi

June 21 19	St. Louis City SC	1–3	Real Salt Lake	St. Louis, Missouri
6:30 pm MT	Gioacchini 21'; Stroud (yellow card) 29'; Ostrák (yellow card) 30'; Nerwinski (yellow card) 47'; Bartlett (yellow card) 55'	Report	Luna 15'; Kreilach 48', 66'; Vera (yellow card) 54'; Beavers (yellow card) 71'	Stadium: Citypark; Attendance: 22,423; Referee: Lukasz Szpala

June 24 20	Real Salt Lake	2–2	Minnesota United FC	Sandy, Utah
7:30 pm MT	Silva (yellow card) 58'; Musovski 79'; Glad 90+8'	Report	Dotson 27'; Reynoso 39'; Irwin (yellow card) 90+2'	Stadium: America First Field; Attendance: 19,439; Referee: Tori Penso

July 1 21	Toronto FC	0–1	Real Salt Lake	Toronto, Ontario
5:30 pm MT	Mabika (yellow card) 21'	Report	Paul (yellow card) 86'; Julio 90+2'	Stadium: BMO Field; Attendance: 26,694; Referee: Marcos de Oliveira

July 8 22	Real Salt Lake	4–0	Orlando City SC	Sandy, Utah
7:30 pm MT	Arango 23'; Glad 41'; Luna (yellow card) 53'; Ojeda (yellow card) 62'; Vera (yellow card) 70'; Savarino 78'; Julio 89'	Report	Cartagena (yellow card) 38'	Stadium: America First Field; Attendance: 20,800; Referee: Mark Allatin

July 12 23	Sporting Kansas City	2–2	Real Salt Lake	Kansas City, Kansas
6:30 pm MT	Sallói 30'; Russell 36'	Report	Musovski 46'; Arango (yellow card) 67'; Julio 72'; Ruiz (yellow card) 87'	Stadium: Children's Mercy Park; Attendance: 17,924; Referee: Rubiel Vazquez

July 15 24	Real Salt Lake	3–1	New York Red Bulls	Sandy, Utah
7:30 pm MT	Luna 2', 53'; Savarino 81'; Brody (yellow card) 83'; Vera (yellow card) 84'; Julio (yellow card) 90'	Report	Tolkin (yellow card) 55'; Amaya 80'	Stadium: America First Field; Attendance: 20,556; Referee: Alexis Da Silva

August 26 25	Real Salt Lake	0–3	Houston Dynamo FC	Sandy, Utah
7:30 pm MT	Chang (yellow card) 50'; Julio (yellow card) 63'	Report	Baird 9'; Steres 29'; Carrasquilla 75'	Stadium: America First Field; Attendance: 21,471; Referee: Alex Chilowicz

August 30 26	Portland Timbers	2–1	Real Salt Lake	Portland, Oregon
8:30 pm MT	Moreno 13'; Chará (yellow card) 34'; Mora 64'; Asprilla (yellow card) 90+3'; Bingham (yellow card) 90+5'	Report	Ojeda (yellow card) 45+1'; Arango 83'; Vera (yellow card) 86'	Stadium: Providence Park; Attendance: 21,320; Referee: Joseph Dickerson

September 2 27 RMC	Real Salt Lake	2–0	Colorado Rapids	Sandy, Utah
7:30 pm MT	Vera 19', (yellow card) 62'; Palacio (yellow card) 24'; Arango 49'	Report	Ronan (yellow card) 16'; Maxsø (yellow card) 42'; Abubakar (yellow card) 72'	Stadium: America First Field; Attendance: 19,798; Referee: Nima Saghafi

September 16 28	San Jose Earthquakes	2–1	Real Salt Lake	San Jose, California
8:30 pm MT	Ebobisse 2'; Rodrigues 15'	Report	Vera (yellow card) 13'; Arango 44', (yellow card) 69'	Stadium: PayPal Park; Attendance: 15,390; Referee: Natalie Simon

September 20 29	Real Salt Lake	1–3	FC Dallas	Sandy, Utah
7:30pm MT	Kreilach (yellow card) 20'; Arango 43'; Silva (yellow card) 60'	Report	Arriola 56'; Ferreira 62' (pen.), 71'	Stadium: America First Field; Attendance: 17,842; Referee: Pierre-Luc Lauziere

September 23 30	Real Salt Lake	2–1	Vancouver Whitecaps FC	Sandy, Utah
7:30 pm MT	Vera 47', (yellow card) 90+4'; Glad 65'; Brody (yellow card) 74'; Palacio (yellow card) 82'	Report	White 17'; Adekugbe (yellow card) 90+11'	Stadium: America First Field; Attendance: 19,243; Referee: Malik Badawi

October 1 31	Los Angeles FC	0–1	Real Salt Lake	Los Angeles, California
6:00 pm MT	Sánchez (yellow card) 39'; Olivera (yellow card) 56'; Tillman (yellow card) 62'; Bogusz (yellow card) 67'; Palacios (yellow card) 78'	Report	Gómez (yellow card) 51'; Arango 72'; Rubin (yellow card) 86'; Palacio (yellow card) 89'	Stadium: BMO Stadium; Attendance: 22,221; Referee: Timothy Ford

October 7 32	Real Salt Lake	2–3	Sporting Kansas City	Sandy, Utah
7:30 pm MT	Glad (red card) 3'; Vera (yellow card) 58', (goal) 81'; Savarino 89'; MacMath (yellow card) 90+7'	Report	Thommy 4'; Russell 29'; Radoja (yellow card) 38'; Pulido 77'; Melia (yellow card) 90+2'	Stadium: America First Field; Attendance: 21,205; Referee: Ted Unkel

October 14 33	LA Galaxy	2–2	Real Salt Lake	Carson, California
8:30 pm MT	Joveljic 7'; Costa 34'; Alfaro (yellow card) 66'; Aguirre (yellow card) 75'	Report	Julio 45+1'; Eneli (yellow card) 54'; Luna 76'	Stadium: Dignity Health Sports Park; Attendance: 20,673; Referee: Jair Marrufo
Note: Match rescheduled from August 20 due to Hurricane Hilary making landfall in Southern California.

October 21 34 RMC	Colorado Rapids	0–1	Real Salt Lake	Commerce City, Colorado
7:00 pm MT	Bassett (yellow card) 15'	Report	Julio (yellow card) 30'; Luna 74'	Stadium: Dick's Sporting Goods Park; Attendance: 17,538; Referee: Timothy Ford

==== MLS Cup Playoffs ====
===== Round One =====
October 29 Game 1	Houston Dynamo FC	2–1	Real Salt Lake	Houston, Texas
3:00 pm CT	Herrera 22'; Bassi 79'; Escobar (yellow card) 90+5'; Carrasquilla (yellow card) 90+7'	Report	Oviedo (yellow card) 44'; Luna 54'; Julio (yellow card) 82'	Stadium: Shell Energy Stadium; Attendance: 17,508; Referee: Guido Gonzales Jr.

November 6 Game 2	Real Salt Lake	1–1 (5–4 p)	Houston Dynamo FC	Sandy, Utah
7:00 pm MT	Glad (yellow card) 27'; Ojeda (yellow card) 33'; Vera (yellow card) 52'; Savarino 70'	Report	Clark (yellow card) 16'; Bassi (yellow card) 17', (goal) 28'; Dorsey (yellow card) 48'; Carrasquilla (yellow card) 69'; Sviatchenko (yellow card) 71'	Stadium: America First Field; Attendance: 20,251; Referee: Fotis Bazakos
	Penalties
	Arango (penalty scored); Kreilach (penalty scored); Savarino (penalty scored); Vera (penalty scored); Luna (penalty scored)		(penalty missed) Bassi; (penalty scored) Carrasquilla; (penalty scored) Úlfarrson; (penalty scored) Dorsey; (penalty scored) Quiñónes

November 11 Game 3	Houston Dynamo FC	1–1 (4–3 p)	Real Salt Lake	Houston, Texas
3:00 pm CT	Baird (yellow card) 20', (goal) 28'	Report	Savarino (yellow card) 46'; Luna 65'; Arango (yellow card) 66'; Vera (yellow card) 72'	Stadium: Shell Energy Stadium; Attendance: 16,374; Referee: Chris Penso
	Penalties
	Carrasquilla (penalty scored); Úlfarrson (penalty scored); Bassi (penalty scored); Quiñónes (penalty missed); Dorsey (penalty scored)		(penalty scored) Arango; (penalty scored) Rubin; (penalty missed) Luna; (penalty scored) Vera; (penalty missed) Musovski
Note: Houston Dynamo FC won the series 2–1.

==== Standings ====
===== Western Conference table =====
MLS Western Conference table (2023)
Pos	Team	Pld	W	L	T	GF	GA	GD	Pts	Qualification
1	St. Louis City SC	34	17	12	5	62	45	+17	56	Qualification for round one and the CONCACAF Champions Cup Round One
2	Seattle Sounders FC	34	14	9	11	41	32	+9	53	Qualification for round one
3	Los Angeles FC	34	14	10	10	54	39	+15	52	Qualification for round one
4	Houston Dynamo FC	34	14	11	9	51	38	+13	51	Qualification for round one
5	Real Salt Lake	34	14	12	8	48	50	−2	50	Qualification for round one
6	Vancouver Whitecaps FC	34	12	10	12	55	48	+7	48	Qualification for round one
7	FC Dallas	34	11	10	13	41	37	+4	46	Qualification for round one
8	Sporting Kansas City	34	12	14	8	48	51	−3	44	Qualification for the wild-card round
9	San Jose Earthquakes	34	10	10	14	39	43	−4	44	Qualification for the wild-card round
10	Portland Timbers	34	11	13	10	46	58	−12	43	
11	Minnesota United FC	34	10	13	11	46	51	−5	41	
12	Austin FC	34	10	15	9	49	55	−6	39	
13	LA Galaxy	34	8	14	12	51	67	−16	36	
14	Colorado Rapids	34	5	17	12	26	54	−28	27	

Source: MLS
Rules for classification: 1) points; 2) total wins; 3) total goal differential; 4) total goals scored; 5) fewer disciplinary points; 6) away goal differential; 7) away goals scored; 8) home goals differential; 9) home goals scored; 10) coin toss (2 clubs tied) or drawing of lots (≥3 clubs tied)

===== Overall table =====
Overall MLS standings table
Pos	Team	Pld	W	L	T	GF	GA	GD	Pts	Qualification
9	Houston Dynamo FC (U)	34	14	11	9	51	38	+13	51	Qualification for the CONCACAF Champions Cup Round One and U.S. Open Cup Round of 32 (Note: Qualify for both the Champions Cup and U.S. Open Cup as 2023 U.S. Open Cup champions)
10	Atlanta United FC	34	13	9	12	66	53	+13	51	Qualification for the U.S. Open Cup Round of 32 (Note: As one of the top seven teams in the overall table to not qualify for the 2024 CONCACAF Champions Cup)
11	Real Salt Lake	34	14	12	8	48	50	−2	50	Qualification for the U.S. Open Cup Round of 32
12	Nashville SC	34	13	11	10	39	32	+7	49	Qualification for the CONCACAF Champions Cup Round One (Note: As 2023 Leagues Cup runner-up)
13	Vancouver Whitecaps FC (V)	34	12	10	12	55	48	+7	48	Qualification for the CONCACAF Champions Cup Round One (Note: As 2023 Canadian Championship winners)

Source: MLS
Rules for classification: 1) points; 2) total wins; 3) total goal differential; 4) total goals scored; 5) fewer disciplinary points; 6) away goal differential; 7) away goals scored; 8) home goals differential; 9) home goals scored; 10) coin toss (2 clubs tied) or drawing of lots (≥3 clubs tied)
(U) U.S. Open Cup winner; (V) Canadian Championship winner

=== Leagues Cup ===
The Leagues Cup will occur between July 21 and August 19, with all MLS teams competing and regular season play being suspended. Real Salt Lake will enter in the group stage as a seeded team, based on 2022 standings.

==== West 2 ====
Pos	Team	Pld	W	PW	PL	L	GF	GA	GD	Pts	Qualification	MON	RSL	SEA
1	(Mexico) Monterrey	2	2	0	0	0	7	2	+5	6	Advance to knockout stage	—	3–0	4–2
2	(United States) Real Salt Lake	2	1	0	0	1	3	3	0	3	Advance to knockout stage	—	—	3–0
3	(United States) Seattle Sounders FC	2	0	0	0	2	2	7	−5	0		—	—	—

Source: Leagues Cup
Rules for classification: Tiebreakers

July 22 Group stage	Real Salt Lake (United States)	3–0	(United States) Seattle Sounders FC	Sandy, Utah
9:30 pm ET	Oviedo (yellow card) 33'; Arango (yellow card) 45+2', (goal) 51'; Savarino 48'; Silva (red card) 60'; Vera (yellow card) 81'; Rubín 88'	Report	Yeimar (yellow card) 45+2'	Stadium: America First Field; Attendance: 10,507; Referee: Guillermo Pacheco Larios

July 26 Group stage	Real Salt Lake (United States)	0–3	(Mexico) Monterrey	Sandy, Utah
9:30 pm ET	Ojeda (yellow card) 66'	Report	Glad 8' (o.g.); Berterame 13', 74'; Govea (yellow card) 33'; Romo (yellow card) 87'	Stadium: America First Field; Attendance: 20,734; Referee: Rosendo Mendoza

==== Knockout round ====
August 4 Round of 32	Real Salt Lake (United States)	3–1	(Mexico) León	Sandy, Utah
9:00 pm ET	Vera (yellow card) 19'; Musovski (yellow card) 60', (goal) 69', 71'; Arango 81'	Report	Moreno 8', (yellow card) 60'; Tesillo (yellow card) 87'	Stadium: America First Field; Attendance: 17,547; Referee: Benjamin Pineda
Note: Match rescheduled from August 3 due to severe weather in the area.

August 8 Round of 16	Los Angeles FC (United States)	4–0	(United States) Real Salt Lake	Los Angeles, California
10:00 pm ET	Chiellini (yellow card) 38'; Bouanga 52', 56'; Ordaz 62'; Palencia (yellow card) 83'; Krastev 84'	Report		Stadium: BMO Stadium; Attendance: 17,728; Referee: Rubiel Vazquez

=== U.S. Open Cup ===
Real Salt Lake entered the Open Cup in the Third Round, based on 2022 standings.

April 26 3rd	Las Vegas Lights FC (USLC) (Nevada)	1–3 (a.e.t.)	(Utah) Real Salt Lake (MLS)	Las Vegas, Nevada
8:00 PM MDT	Bushue (yellow card) 63'; Stauffer 112'; Zuluaga (yellow card) 112'	Report	Holt (yellow card) 61'; Kreilach 106', 116'; Musovski 121'	Stadium: Cashman Field; Attendance: 300; Referee: Brandon Gardner

May 10 Round of 32	Portland Timbers (MLS) (Oregon)	3–4	(Utah) Real Salt Lake (MLS)	Portland, Oregon
7:30 PM PDT	Blanco 4'; Rasmussen 50'; Niezgoda 52'; Griffith (yellow card) 62'; Loría (yellow card) 72'; Bonilla (yellow card) 88'; Asprilla (yellow card) 90+3'	Report	Musovski 30'; Gómez 41', (yellow card) 51'; Chang 55', 59'; Pierre (yellow card) 70'; Ojeda (yellow card) 90+6'	Stadium: Providence Park; Attendance: 8,071; Referee: Victor Rivas

May 24 Round of 16	Colorado Rapids (MLS)	0–1	(Utah) Real Salt Lake (MLS)	Commerce City, Colorado
8:00 PM MDT	Rosenberry (yellow card) 78'	Report	Gómez (yellow card) 12'; Savarino 30'; Ojeda (yellow card) 37'; Löffelsend (yellow card) 82'	Stadium: Dick's Sporting Goods Park; Attendance: 2,280; Referee: Andrew Musashe

June 7 Quarterfinals	Real Salt Lake (MLS) (Utah)	3–2	(California) LA Galaxy (MLS)	Sandy, Utah
7:30 PM MDT	Kreilach 19', 45+7' (pen.), (yellow card) 56'; Glad (yellow card) 32'; Savarino 51'; Eneli (yellow card) 61'	Report	Neal (yellow card) 59'; Brugman 82'; Costa 84'	Stadium: America First Field; Attendance: 20,712; Referee: Ramy Touchan

August 23 Semifinals	Houston Dynamo FC (MLS) (Texas)	3–1 (a.e.t.)	(Utah) Real Salt Lake (MLS)	Houston, Texas
7:30 PM MDT	Dorsey (yellow card) 22'; Herrera (yellow card) 38' (goal) 45+5'; Carrasquilla (yellow card) 93' (goal) 105'; Artur (yellow card) 118'; Caicedo 120+5'	Report	Vera (yellow card) 38' (yellow-red card) 119'; Arango (yellow card) 59'; Julio 64'; Eneli (yellow card) 67'; A. Gómez (yellow card) 72'; Glad (yellow card) 106'; Palacio (yellow card) 114'	Stadium: Shell Energy Stadium; Attendance: 11,137; Referee: Lukasz Szpala

== Statistics ==
=== Squad appearances ===
As of November 11, 2023

No	Pos	Nat	Player	Total		MLS Regular Season		Leagues Cup		US Open Cup		MLS Cup Playoffs	
No	Pos	Nat	Player	Apps	Starts	Apps	Starts	Apps	Starts	Apps	Starts	Apps	Starts
Goalkeepers
18	GK	(United States)	Zac MacMath	35	35	28	28	3	3	1	1	3	3
35	GK	(United States)	Gavin Beavers	12	11	7	6	1	1	4	4	0	0
81	GK	(United States)	Tomas Gomez	0	0	0	0	0	0	0	0	0	0
Defenders
2	DF	(United States)	Andrew Brody	37	32	29	25	2	2	4	3	2	2
4	DF	(Colombia)	Brayan Vera	32	32	24	24	3	3	2	2	3	3
15	DF	(United States)	Justen Glad	42	40	32	31	3	2	5	5	2	2
20	DF	(United States)	Erik Holt	3	2	2	1	0	0	1	1	0	0
22	DF	(Haiti)	Delentz Pierre	2	2	0	0	0	0	2	2	0	0
30	DF	(Uruguay)	Marcelo Silva	22	19	16	15	3	3	3	1	0	0
32	DF	(United States)	Zack Farnsworth	0	0	0	0	0	0	0	0	0	0
36	DF	(Costa Rica)	Bryan Oviedo	34	26	25	19	3	2	3	2	3	3
49	DF	(United States)	Luis Rivera	0	0	0	0	0	0	0	0	0	0
Midfielders
6	MF	(Argentina)	Pablo Ruíz	25	23	17	15	4	4	4	4	0	0
8	MF	(Croatia)	Damir Kreilach	33	19	27	15	0	0	5	4	1	0
12	MF	(United States)	Scott Caldwell	5	3	4	3	0	0	1	0	0	0
13	MF	(Colombia)	Nelson Palacio	16	12	11	10	2	0	1	0	2	2
16	MF	(Cuba)	Maikel Chang	29	16	22	12	1	0	5	3	1	1
19	MF	(United States)	Bode Hidalgo	30	16	23	13	3	1	3	1	1	1
25	MF	(United States)	Emeka Eneli	31	23	21	13	3	3	5	5	2	2
26	MF	(United States)	Diego Luna	32	22	23	14	4	3	2	2	3	3
28	MF	(Germany)	Jasper Löffelsend	26	16	21	15	1	0	3	1	1	0
31	MF	(Trinidad and Tobago)	Kevon Lambert	3	0	2	0	0	0	0	0	1	0
33	MF	(United States)	Moses Nyeman	2	0	2	0	0	0	0	0	0	0
38	MF	(United States)	Jude Wellings	0	0	0	0	0	0	0	0	0	0
72	MF	(United States)	Zavier Gozo	1	0	1	0	0	0	0	0	0	0
88	MF	(Paraguay)	Braian Ojeda	42	32	30	22	4	4	5	3	3	3
Forwards
9	FW	(Colombia)	Chicho Arango	18	14	11	9	4	4	1	1	2	0
10	FW	(Venezuela)	Jefferson Savarino	34	32	24	22	4	4	3	3	3	3
11	FW	(Colombia)	Andrés Gómez	40	21	30	15	2	1	5	3	3	2
14	FW	(Guatemala)	Rubio Rubin	31	17	22	14	4	1	3	1	2	1
23	FW	(United States)	Ilijah Paul	9	2	7	1	0	0	2	1	0	0
27	FW	(France)	Bertin Jacquesson	12	4	10	4	0	0	2	0	0	0
29	FW	(Ecuador)	Anderson Julio	38	15	28	12	4	0	3	1	3	2
31	FW	(Ivory Coast)	Axel Kei	1	0	1	0	0	0	0	0	0	0
39	FW	(United States)	Danny Musovski	34	18	24	14	4	3	4	1	2	0
Other players (Departed during season, short-term loan, etc.)
	FW	(Argentina)	Jonathan Menéndez	0	0	0	0	0	0	0	0	0	0
9	FW	(Iraq)	Justin Meram	6	2	6	2	0	0	0	0	0	0
33	MF	(United States)	Julio Benitez	0	0	0	0	0	0	0	0	0	0
99	DF	(Mexico)	Jaziel Orozco	0	0	0	0	0	0	0	0	0	0

=== Goals ===
As of November 11, 2023

Goals
Rank	Player	Nation	Total	MLS Regular Season	Leagues Cup	US Open Cup	MLS Cup Playoffs
1	Jefferson Savarino	(Venezuela)	11	7	1	2	1
2	Danny Musovski	(United States)	9	5	2	2	0
3	Chicho Arango	(Colombia)	8	6	2	0	0
3	Damir Kreilach	(Croatia)	8	4	0	4	0
5	Diego Luna	(United States)	7	5	0	0	2
6	Anderson Julio	(Ecuador)	6	5	0	1	0
7	Justen Glad	(United States)	5	5	0	0	0
8	Pablo Ruiz	(Argentina)	4	4	0	0	0
9	Rubio Rubin	(Guatemala)	3	2	1	0	0
9	Brayan Vera	(Colombia)	3	3	0	0	0
11	Maikel Chang	(Cuba)	2	0	0	2	0
11	Andrés Goméz	(Colombia)	2	1	0	1	0
13	Jasper Löffelsend	(Germany)	1	1	0	0	0

=== Assists ===
As of June 15, 2023

Assists
Rank	Player	Nation	Total	MLS Regular Season	Leagues Cup	US Open Cup
1	Andrés Gómez	(Colombia)	6	4	0	2
2	Jefferson Savarino	(Venezuela)	5	4	0	1
3	Danny Musovski	(United States)	3	2	0	1
3	Rubio Rubín	(Guatemala)	3	1	0	2
5	Maikel Chang	(Cuba)	2	2	0	0
5	Bode Hidalgo	(United States)	2	1	0	1
5	Bertin Jacquesson	(France)	2	1	0	1
5	Damir Kreilach	(Croatia)	2	1	0	1
5	Bryan Oviedo	(Costa Rica)	2	2	0	0
11	Andrew Brody	(United States)	1	1	0	0
11	Anderson Julio	(Ecuador)	1	0	0	1
11	Jasper Löffelsend	(Germany)	1	1	0	0
11	Justin Meram	(Iraq)	1	1	0	0
11	Braian Ojeda	(Paraguay)	1	1	0	0
11	Brayan Vera	(Colombia)	1	1	0	0

=== Clean Sheets ===
As of November 11, 2023

Shutouts
Rank	Player	Nation	Total	MLS Regular Season	Leagues Cup	US Open Cup	MLS Cup Playoffs
1	Zac MacMath	(United States)	10	9	1	0	0
2	Gavin Beavers	(United States)	1	0	0	1	0
