= List of Major League Soccer transfers 2022 =

The following is a list of transfers for the 2022 Major League Soccer (MLS) season that have been made during the 2021–22 MLS offseason all the way through to the roster freeze.

== Transfers ==
List of 2022 MLS transfers
| Date | Name | Moving from | Moving to | Mode of Transfer |
|---|---|---|---|---|
| October 12, 2021 | (United States) Missael Rodríguez | (United States) Chicago Fire Academy | Chicago Fire FC | Homegrown player |
| October 23, 2021 | (United States) Sergio Oregel | (United States) Chicago Fire Academy | Chicago Fire FC | Homegrown player |
| December 5, 2021 | (Italy) Gabriele Corbo | (Italy) Bologna | CF Montréal | Loan |
| December 12, 2021 | (United States) Teal Bunbury | New England Revolution | Nashville SC | Trade |
| December 12, 2021 | (Argentina) Franco Escobar | Atlanta United FC | Los Angeles FC | Trade |
| December 12, 2021 | (United States) Jaylin Lindsey | Sporting Kansas City | Charlotte FC | Trade |
| December 12, 2021 | (Scotland) Lewis Morgan | Inter Miami CF | New York Red Bulls | Trade |
| December 12, 2021 | (Brazil) Jean Mota | (Brazil) Santos | Inter Miami CF | Transfer |
| December 12, 2021 | (Mexico) Pablo Sisniega | Los Angeles FC | Charlotte FC | Trade |
| December 12, 2021 | (United States) Daniel Steres | LA Galaxy | Houston Dynamo FC | Trade |
| December 12, 2021 | (United States) Ethan Zubak | LA Galaxy | Nashville SC | Trade |
| December 13, 2021 | (Colombia) Eduard Atuesta | Los Angeles FC | (Brazil) Palmeiras | Transfer |
| December 13, 2021 | (Brazil) Vinicius Mello | (Brazil) Internacional | Charlotte FC | Transfer |
| December 14, 2021 | (United States) Samuel Adeniran | (United States) Tacoma Defiance | Seattle Sounders FC | Free |
| December 14, 2021 | (United States) Tristan Blackmon | Los Angeles FC | Charlotte FC | Expansion Draft |
| December 14, 2021 | (United States) Tristan Blackmon | Charlotte FC | Vancouver Whitecaps FC | Trade |
| December 14, 2021 | (United States) McKinze Gaines | Austin FC | Charlotte FC | Expansion Draft |
| December 14, 2021 | (Costa Rica) Joseph Mora | D.C. United | Charlotte FC | Expansion Draft |
| December 14, 2021 | (Libya) Ismael Tajouri-Shradi | New York City FC | Charlotte FC | Expansion Draft |
| December 14, 2021 | (Libya) Ismael Tajouri-Shradi | Charlotte FC | Los Angeles FC | Trade |
| December 14, 2021 | (United States) Obed Vargas | (United States) Tacoma Defiance | Seattle Sounders FC | Homegrown player |
| December 14, 2021 | (England) Anton Walkes | Atlanta United FC | Charlotte FC | Expansion Draft |
| December 16, 2021 | (United States) Alec Kann | Atlanta United FC | FC Cincinnati | Free |
| December 16, 2021 | (Costa Rica) Ariel Lassiter | Houston Dynamo FC | Inter Miami CF | Trade |
| December 16, 2021 | (United States) Sebastian Lletget | LA Galaxy | New England Revolution | Trade |
| December 16, 2021 | (United States) Dylan Nealis | Nashville SC | New York Red Bulls | Trade |
| December 17, 2021 | (England) Mo Adams | Atlanta United FC | Inter Miami CF | Trade |
| December 17, 2021 | (Ghana) Harrison Afful | Columbus Crew | Charlotte FC | Free |
| December 17, 2021 | (United States) Josh Bauer | Atlanta United FC | Nashville SC | Re-Entry Draft Stage 1 |
| December 17, 2021 | (United States) Dylan Castanheira | Inter Miami CF | Atlanta United FC | Trade |
| December 17, 2021 | (United States) Daniel Edelman | (United States) New York Red Bulls II | New York Red Bulls | Homegrown player |
| December 17, 2021 | (Jamaica) Alvas Powell | Philadelphia Union | FC Cincinnati | Free |
| December 17, 2021 | (Peru) Yordy Reyna | D.C. United | Charlotte FC | Free |
| December 18, 2021 | (United States) Justin Portillo | Real Salt Lake | (United States) New Mexico United | Free |
| December 20, 2021 | (United States) Ethan Finlay | Minnesota United FC | Austin FC | Free |
| December 20, 2021 | (United States) Spencer Richey | Seattle Sounders FC | Chicago Fire FC | Free |
| December 20, 2021 | (United States) Ben Sweat | Austin FC | Sporting Kansas City | Free |
| December 21, 2021 | (Ecuador) Alan Franco | (Brazil) Atlético Mineiro | Charlotte FC | Loan |
| December 21, 2021 | (Spain) Oriol Rosell | Orlando City SC | Sporting Kansas City | Free |
| December 22, 2021 | (United States) Victor Bezerra | (United States) Indiana Hoosiers | Chicago Fire FC | Homegrown player |
| December 22, 2021 | (United States) Steve Clark | Portland Timbers | Houston Dynamo FC | Free |
| December 22, 2021 | (United States) Omar Gonzalez | Toronto FC | New England Revolution | Free |
| December 22, 2021 | (United States) Shane O'Neill | Seattle Sounders FC | Toronto FC | Free |
| December 23, 2021 | (Honduras) Bryan Acosta | FC Dallas | Colorado Rapids | Re-Entry Draft Stage 2 |
| December 23, 2021 | (Cuba) Osvaldo Alonso | Minnesota United FC | Atlanta United FC | Free |
| December 23, 2021 | (Slovenia) Robert Berić | Chicago Fire FC | Sporting Kansas City | Re-Entry Draft Stage 2 |
| December 23, 2021 | (Argentina) Julián Carranza | Inter Miami CF | Philadelphia Union | Loan |
| December 23, 2021 | (United States) Eric Dick | Columbus Crew | Minnesota United FC | Re-Entry Draft Stage 2 |
| December 23, 2021 | (Mexico) Jonathan dos Santos | LA Galaxy | (Mexico) Club América | Free |
| December 23, 2021 | (Slovakia) Ján Greguš | Minnesota United FC | San Jose Earthquakes | Re-Entry Draft Stage 2 |
| December 23, 2021 | (United States) John Nelson | FC Dallas | FC Cincinnati | Re-Entry Draft Stage 2 |
| December 23, 2021 | (United States) Brady Scott | Austin FC | Columbus Crew | Re-Entry Draft Stage 2 |
| December 27, 2021 | (Canada) Alistair Johnston | Nashville SC | CF Montréal | Trade |
| December 28, 2021 | (Croatia) Kristijan Kahlina | (Bulgaria) Ludogorets Razgrad | Charlotte FC | Transfer |
| December 28, 2021 | (United States) Kyle Morton | Houston Dynamo FC | (United States) Louisville City | Free |
| December 28, 2021 | (Argentina) Maximiliano Urruti | Houston Dynamo FC | Austin FC | Free |
| January 1, 2022 | (Ecuador) Jordy Alcívar | (Ecuador) L.D.U. Quito | Charlotte FC | Transfer |
| January 1, 2022 | (Argentina) Ignacio Aliseda | Chicago Fire FC | (Switzerland) FC Lugano | Transfer |
| January 1, 2022 | (United States) Ventura Alvarado | Inter Miami CF | (Mexico) FC Juárez | Free |
| January 1, 2022 | (Brazil) Carlos Miguel Coronel | (Austria) Red Bull Salzburg | New York Red Bulls | Transfer |
| January 1, 2022 | (Uruguay) Guzmán Corujo | (Uruguay) Nacional | Charlotte FC | Free |
| January 1, 2022 | (United States) Daryl Dike | Orlando City SC | (England) West Bromwich Albion | Transfer |
| January 1, 2022 | (United States) Kyle Duncan | New York Red Bulls | (Belgium) Oostende | Free |
| January 1, 2022 | (Canada) Julian Dunn | Toronto FC | (Norway) HamKam | Free |
| January 1, 2022 | (Colombia) Jhon Durán | (Colombia) Envigado | Chicago Fire FC | Transfer |
| January 1, 2022 | (Egypt) Ahmed Hamdy | (Egypt) El Gouna | CF Montréal | Transfer |
| January 1, 2022 | (Slovenia) Žan Kolmanič | (Slovenia) Maribor | Austin FC | Transfer |
| January 1, 2022 | (Finland) Lassi Lappalainen | (Italy) Bologna | CF Montréal | Transfer |
| January 1, 2022 | (Spain) Álvaro Medrán | Chicago Fire FC | (Saudi Arabia) Al-Taawoun | Free |
| January 1, 2022 | (United States) Chris Mueller | Orlando City SC | (Scotland) Hibernian | Free |
| January 1, 2022 | (Finland) Jukka Raitala | Minnesota United FC | (Finland) HJK | Free |
| January 1, 2022 | (Ivory Coast) Gaoussou Samaké | (Ivory Coast) ASEC Mimosas | D.C. United | Transfer |
| January 1, 2022 | (Argentina) Joaquín Torres | (Argentina) Newell's Old Boys | CF Montréal | Transfer |
| January 1, 2022 | (Ecuador) Gustavo Vallecilla | (Ecuador) Aucas | FC Cincinnati | Transfer |
| January 2, 2022 | (Germany) Rafael Czichos | (Germany) FC Köln | Chicago Fire FC | Transfer |
| January 3, 2022 | (United States) Ricardo Pepi | FC Dallas | (Germany) FC Augsburg | Transfer |
| January 4, 2022 | (Senegal) Dominique Badji | Colorado Rapids | FC Cincinnati | Free |
| January 4, 2022 | (United States) Sean Davis | New York Red Bulls | Nashville SC | Free |
| January 4, 2022 | (United States) Bryce Duke | Los Angeles FC | Inter Miami CF | Trade |
| January 4, 2022 | (United States) Brendan Hines-Ike | (Belgium) K.V. Kortrijk | D.C. United | Transfer |
| January 4, 2022 | (Mexico) Rodolfo Pizarro | Inter Miami CF | (Mexico) Monterrey | Loan |
| January 4, 2022 | (United States) Aedan Stanley | Austin FC | (United States) Miami FC | Free |
| January 5, 2022 | (Venezuela) Alejandro Fuenmayor | Houston Dynamo FC | (United States) Oakland Roots | Free |
| January 5, 2022 | (United States) Ray Gaddis | Retired | FC Cincinnati | Free |
| January 5, 2022 | (South Africa) Bongokuhle Hlongwane | (South Africa) Maritzburg United | Minnesota United FC | Transfer |
| January 5, 2022 | (United States) Aboubacar Keita | Columbus Crew | Colorado Rapids | Trade |
| January 5, 2022 | (United States) James Sands | New York City FC | (Scotland) Rangers | Loan |
| January 5, 2022 | (United States) Caleb Stanko | FC Cincinnati | (Greece) PAS Giannina | Free |
| January 6, 2022 | (Brazil) Max Alves | (Brazil) Flamengo | Colorado Rapids | Transfer |
| January 6, 2022 | (United States) Chris Hegardt | (United States) Georgetown Hoyas | Charlotte FC | Homegrown player |
| January 6, 2022 | (Suriname) Kelvin Leerdam | Inter Miami CF | LA Galaxy | Free |
| January 6, 2022 | (Argentina) Emmanuel Mas | Orlando City SC | (Argentina) Estudiantes | Free |
| January 6, 2022 | (Ghana) Yaw Yeboah | (Poland) Wisła Kraków | Columbus Crew | Transfer |
| January 7, 2022 | (Honduras) Danilo Acosta | LA Galaxy | (United States) Orange County SC | Free |
| January 7, 2022 | (Uruguay) César Araújo | (Uruguay) Montevideo Wanderers | Orlando City SC | Transfer |
| January 7, 2022 | (New Zealand) Elliot Collier | Chicago Fire FC | (United States) San Antonio FC | Free |
| January 7, 2022 | (Canada) Raheem Edwards | Los Angeles FC | LA Galaxy | Free |
| January 8, 2022 | (Canada) Richie Laryea | Toronto FC | (England) Nottingham Forest | Transfer |
| January 8, 2022 | (Estonia) Erik Sorga | D.C. United | (Sweden) IFK Göteborg | Transfer |
| January 9, 2022 | (Canada) Sebastian Breza | (Italy) Bologna | CF Montréal | Loan |
| January 10, 2022 | (Chile) José Bizama | Houston Dynamo FC | (Chile) Palestino | Free |
| January 10, 2022 | (United States) Dom Dwyer | Toronto FC | FC Dallas | Trade |
| January 10, 2022 | (United States) Justin Garces | (United States) UCLA Bruins | Atlanta United FC | Homegrown player |
| January 10, 2022 | (Argentina) Leandro González Pírez | Inter Miami CF | (Argentina) River Plate | Loan |
| January 10, 2022 | (Venezuela) Christian Makoun | Inter Miami CF | Charlotte FC | Trade |
| January 10, 2022 | (Guinea-Bissau) Nanu | (Portugal) Porto | FC Dallas | Loan |
| January 10, 2022 | (Argentina) Tomás Pochettino | Austin FC | (Argentina) River Plate | Loan |
| January 11, 2022 | (United States) Ben Bender | (United States) Maryland Terrapins | Charlotte FC | SuperDraft |
| January 11, 2022 | (Burkina Faso) Ousseni Bouda | (United States) Stanford Cardinal | San Jose Earthquakes | SuperDraft |
| January 11, 2022 | (United States) Roman Celentano | (United States) Indiana Hoosiers | FC Cincinnati | SuperDraft |
| January 11, 2022 | (United States) Erik Centeno | (United States) Pacific Tigers | Atlanta United FC | SuperDraft |
| January 11, 2022 | (Senegal) Clément Diop | CF Montréal | Inter Miami CF | Free |
| January 11, 2022 | (United States) Tega Ikoba | (United States) North Carolina Tar Heels | Portland Timbers | Homegrown player |
| January 11, 2022 | (United States) Kipp Keller | (United States) Saint Louis Billikens | Austin FC | SuperDraft |
| January 11, 2022 | (United States) David Loera | Orlando City SC | (United States) San Antonio FC | Free |
| January 11, 2022 | (United States) Isaiah Parker | (United States) Saint Louis Billikens | FC Dallas | SuperDraft |
| January 11, 2022 | (Canada) Luca Petrasso | (Canada) Toronto FC II | Toronto FC | Homegrown player |
| January 11, 2022 | (United States) Will Richmond | (United States) Stanford Cardinal | San Jose Earthquakes | Homegrown player |
| January 11, 2022 | (United States) Patrick Schulte | (United States) Saint Louis Billikens | Columbus Crew | SuperDraft |
| January 11, 2022 | (United States) Dylan Teves | (United States) Washington Huskies | Seattle Sounders FC | Homegrown player |
| January 11, 2022 | (Iceland) Thorleifur Úlfarsson | (United States) Duke Blue Devils | Houston Dynamo FC | SuperDraft |
| January 11, 2022 | (United States) Jude Wellings | (United States) Real Salt Lake Academy | Real Salt Lake | Homegrown player |
| January 12, 2022 | (United States) Julio Benitez | (United States) Real Monarchs | Real Salt Lake | Homegrown player |
| January 12, 2022 | (United States) Scott Caldwell | New England Revolution | Real Salt Lake | Free |
| January 12, 2022 | (Canada) Jay Chapman | Inter Miami CF | (Scotland) Dundee | Free |
| January 12, 2022 | (Spain) Ilie Sánchez | Sporting Kansas City | Los Angeles FC | Free |
| January 13, 2022 | (United States) Raul Aguilera | Orlando City SC | (United States) Indy Eleven | Free |
| January 13, 2022 | (United States) Gavin Beavers | (United States) Real Monarchs | Real Salt Lake | Homegrown player |
| January 13, 2022 | (United States) David Bingham | Unattached | Portland Timbers | Free |
| January 13, 2022 | (Ghana) Abu Danladi | Nashville SC | Minnesota United FC | Free |
| January 13, 2022 | (United States) Ted Ku-DiPietro | (United States) Loudoun United | D.C. United | Homegrown player |
| January 13, 2022 | (United States) Matt LaGrassa | Nashville SC | (United States) Sacramento Republic | Free |
| January 13, 2022 | (Zambia) Aimé Mabika | (United States) Fort Lauderdale CF | Inter Miami CF | Free |
| January 13, 2022 | (Mexico) Jaziel Orozco | (United States) Real Monarchs | Real Salt Lake | Homegrown player |
| January 13, 2022 | (Slovakia) Albert Rusnák | Real Salt Lake | Seattle Sounders FC | Free |
| January 13, 2022 | (Mexico) Erick Torres | Atlanta United FC | (United States) Orange County SC | Free |
| January 13, 2022 | (Colombia) Jhojan Valencia | (Colombia) Deportivo Cali | Austin FC | Transfer |
| January 13, 2022 | (France) Florian Valot | FC Cincinnati | (United States) Miami FC | Free |
| January 13, 2022 | (United States) Sean Zawadzki | (United States) Georgetown Hoyas | Columbus Crew | Homegrown player |
| January 14, 2022 | (United States) Kellyn Acosta | Colorado Rapids | Los Angeles FC | Trade |
| January 14, 2022 | (United States) Jalil Anibaba | Nashville SC | Columbus Crew | Free |
| January 14, 2022 | (United States) Amadou Dia | Sporting Kansas City | (United States) Louisville City | Free |
| January 14, 2022 | (United States) Kortne Ford | Colorado Rapids | Sporting Kansas City | Free |
| January 14, 2022 | (Ivory Coast) Axel Kei | (United States) Real Monarchs | Real Salt Lake | Homegrown player |
| January 14, 2022 | (Australia) Riley McGree | Charlotte FC | (England) Middlesbrough | Transfer |
| January 14, 2022 | (Sweden) Christopher McVey | (Sweden) Elfsborg | Inter Miami CF | Transfer |
| January 14, 2022 | (United States) Jake Morris | (United States) Campbell Fighting Camels | Columbus Crew | Homegrown player |
| January 14, 2022 | (Portugal) Nani | Orlando City SC | (Italy) Venezia | Free |
| January 14, 2022 | (Belgium) Logan Ndenbe | (France) Guingamp | Sporting Kansas City | Transfer |
| January 14, 2022 | (Trinidad and Tobago) Noah Powder | Real Salt Lake | (United States) Indy Eleven | Free |
| January 14, 2022 | (United States) Bobby Shuttleworth | Chicago Fire FC | Atlanta United FC | Free |
| January 14, 2022 | (United States) Niko Tsakiris | (United States) Quakes Academy | San Jose Earthquakes | Homegrown player |
| January 15, 2022 | (Uruguay) Rodrigo Piñeiro | Nashville SC | (Chile) Unión Española | Loan |
| January 15, 2022 | (Netherlands) Vito Wormgoor | Columbus Crew | (Norway) Start | Free |
| January 16, 2022 | (Jamaica) Damion Lowe | (Egypt) Al Ittihad | Inter Miami CF | Free |
| January 16, 2022 | (United States) Adrian Zendejas | Minnesota United FC | Charlotte FC | Free |
| January 17, 2022 | (Venezuela) Ronald Hernández | (Scotland) Aberdeen | Atlanta United FC | Transfer |
| January 17, 2022 | (Paraguay) Jesús Medina | New York City FC | (Russia) CSKA Moscow | Free |
| January 18, 2022 | (United States) Noel Buck | (United States) New England Revolution II | New England Revolution | Homegrown player |
| January 18, 2022 | (Croatia) Toni Datković | Real Salt Lake | (Spain) Cartagena | Transfer |
| January 18, 2022 | (Paraguay) Sebastián Ferreira | (Paraguay) Club Libertad | Houston Dynamo | Transfer |
| January 18, 2022 | (Canada) Liam Fraser | Toronto FC | (Belgium) KMSK Deinze | Free |
| January 18, 2022 | (Mexico) Richard Sánchez | (United States) North Texas SC | LA Galaxy | Free |
| January 18, 2022 | (United States) Caleb Wiley | (United States) Atlanta United 2 | Atlanta United FC | Homegrown player |
| January 19, 2022 | (United States) Nicholas Benalcazar | (United States) Wake Forest Demon Deacons | New York City FC | Homegrown player |
| January 19, 2022 | (United States) Jonathan Jimenez | (United States) North Carolina Tar Heels | New York City FC | Homegrown player |
| January 19, 2022 | (Argentina) Cristian Ortíz | (Mexico) Tijuana | Charlotte FC | Loan |
| January 19, 2022 | (United States) Samuel Kwaku Owusu | (United States) NYCFC Academy | New York City FC | Homegrown player |
| January 19, 2022 | (Colombia) Emerson Rodriguez | (Colombia) Millonarios | Inter Miami CF | Transfer |
| January 19, 2022 | (Germany) Robert Voloder | (Slovenia) Maribor | Sporting Kansas City | Transfer |
| January 20, 2022 | (United States) Cole Bassett | Colorado Rapids | (Netherlands) Feyenoord | Loan |
| January 20, 2022 | (Ecuador) Leonardo Campana | (England) Wolverhampton | Inter Miami CF | Loan |
| January 20, 2022 | (Venezuela) Jesús Castellano | (Venezuela) Yaracuyanos | New York Red Bulls | Transfer |
| January 20, 2022 | (Canada) Maxime Crépeau | Vancouver Whitecaps FC | Los Angeles FC | Trade |
| January 20, 2022 | (United States) Jake LaCava | (United States) New York Red Bulls II | New York Red Bulls | Free |
| January 20, 2022 | (United States) Jake LaCava | New York Red Bulls | (United States) Tampa Bay Rowdies | Loan |
| January 20, 2022 | (Netherlands) Maarten Paes | (Netherlands) Utrecht | FC Dallas | Loan |
| January 20, 2022 | (United States) Zach Ryan | (United States) Stanford Cardinal | New York Red Bulls | Homegrown player |
| January 20, 2022 | (United States) Patrick Seagrist | Inter Miami CF | (United States) Memphis 901 | Free |
| January 20, 2022 | (Argentina) Diego Valeri | Portland Timbers | (Argentina) Lanús | Transfer |
| January 21, 2022 | (Portugal) Janio Bikel | Vancouver Whitecaps FC | (Italy) L.R. Vicenza | Loan |
| January 21, 2022 | (United States) Justin Che | FC Dallas | (Germany) TSG 1899 Hoffenheim | Loan |
| January 21, 2022 | (United States) Mark Delgado | Toronto FC | LA Galaxy | Trade |
| January 21, 2022 | (Canada) Deandre Kerr | (United States) Syracuse Orange | Toronto FC | Homegrown player |
| January 21, 2022 | (United States) John McCarthy | Inter Miami CF | Los Angeles FC | Free |
| January 21, 2022 | (Trinidad and Tobago) Greg Ranjitsingh | MLS Pool | Toronto FC | Free |
| January 21, 2022 | (United States) Will Sands | (United States) Georgetown Hoyas | Columbus Crew | Homegrown player |
| January 22, 2022 | (Poland) Kacper Przybyłko | Philadelphia Union | Chicago Fire FC | Trade |
| January 24, 2022 | (Australia) Miloš Degenek | (Serbia) Red Star Belgrade | Columbus Crew | Free |
| January 24, 2022 | (Argentina) Nicolás Figal | Inter Miami CF | (Argentina) Boca Juniors | Transfer |
| January 24, 2022 | (Norway) Ruben Gabrielsen | (France) Toulouse | Austin FC | Transfer |
| January 24, 2022 | (United States) Ben Lundt | FC Cincinnati | (United States) Phoenix Rising | Free |
| January 24, 2022 | (United States) Hayden Sargis | (United States) Sacramento Republic | D.C. United | Free |
| January 24, 2022 | (Uruguay) Facundo Torres | (Uruguay) Peñarol | Orlando City SC | Transfer |
| January 24, 2022 | (Cyprus) Marinos Tzionis | (Cyprus) Omonia | Sporting Kansas City | Transfer |
| January 25, 2022 | (United States) Damian Las | (England) Fulham | Austin FC | Transfer |
| January 25, 2022 | (United States) Lukas MacNaughton | (Canada) Pacific FC | Toronto FC | Free |
| January 25, 2022 | (United States) Evan Newton | Vancouver Whitecaps FC | (United States) El Paso Locomotive | Loan |
| January 25, 2022 | (United States) Anthony Sorenson | (United States) Philadelphia Union II | Philadelphia Union | Homegrown player |
| January 25, 2022 | (Serbia) Luka Stojanović | Chicago Fire FC | (Saudi Arabia) Al-Hazem | Free |
| January 26, 2022 | (Ecuador) Alexander Alvarado | Orlando City SC | (Ecuador) L.D.U. Quito | Loan |
| January 26, 2022 | (United States) Paul Arriola | D.C. United | FC Dallas | Trade |
| January 26, 2022 | (Costa Rica) Francisco Calvo | Chicago Fire FC | San Jose Earthquakes | Free |
| January 26, 2022 | (Nigeria) James Igbekeme | (Spain) Real Zaragoza | Columbus Crew | Loan |
| January 26, 2022 | (Denmark) Mathias Jørgensen | New York Red Bulls | (Denmark) Esbjerg | Free |
| January 26, 2022 | (Poland) Karol Świderski | (Greece) PAOK | Charlotte FC | Transfer |
| January 26, 2022 | (United States) Justin Vom Steeg | LA Galaxy | Portland Timbers | Free |
| January 27, 2022 | (Austria) Ercan Kara | (Austria) Rapid Vienna | Orlando City SC | Transfer |
| January 27, 2022 | (Honduras) Douglas Martínez | Real Salt Lake | (United States) Sacramento Republic | Free |
| January 27, 2022 | (Australia) Brad Smith | Seattle Sounders FC | D.C. United | Trade |
| January 27, 2022 | (Denmark) Mikael Uhre | (Denmark) Brøndby | Philadelphia Union | Transfer |
| January 28, 2022 | (Argentina) Mateo Bajamich | Houston Dynamo | (Argentina) CA Huracán | Loan |
| January 28, 2022 | (United States) Lucas Bartlett | (United States) St. John's Red Storm | FC Dallas | SuperDraft |
| January 28, 2022 | (United States) Sami Guediri | Inter Miami CF | (United States) Loudoun United | Free |
| January 28, 2022 | (United States) Grant Lillard | Columbus Crew | (United States) Loudoun United | Free |
| January 28, 2022 | (United States) Trey Muse | Seattle Sounders FC | (United States) Loudoun United | Free |
| January 28, 2022 | (United States) Kevin Paredes | D.C. United | (Germany) VfL Wolfsburg | Transfer |
| January 29, 2022 | (Argentina) Esequiel Barco | Atlanta United FC | (Argentina) River Plate | Loan |
| January 30, 2022 | (Argentina) Milton Valenzuela | Columbus Crew | (Switzerland) Lugano | Free |
| January 31, 2022 | (Canada) Theo Bair | Vancouver Whitecaps FC | (Scotland) St Johnstone | Transfer |
| January 31, 2022 | (United States) George Bello | Atlanta United FC | (Germany) Arminia Bielefeld | Transfer |
| January 31, 2022 | (England) Jamal Blackman | Los Angeles FC | (England) Huddersfield Town | Free |
| January 31, 2022 | (Mexico) Carlos Salcedo | (Mexico) Tigres | Toronto FC | Transfer |
| January 31, 2022 | (Venezuela) Yeferson Soteldo | Toronto FC | (Mexico) Tigres | Transfer |
| January 31, 2022 | (United States) Auston Trusty | Colorado Rapids | (England) Arsenal | Transfer |
| January 31, 2022 | (United States) Auston Trusty | (England) Arsenal | Colorado Rapids | Loan |
| February 1, 2022 | (Argentina) David Ayala | (Argentina) Estudiantes | Portland Timbers | Transfer |
| February 1, 2022 | (Japan) Tsubasa Endoh | Toronto FC | (Australia) Melbourne City | Free |
| February 1, 2022 | (Canada) Ashtone Morgan | Real Salt Lake | (Canada) Forge FC | Free |
| February 1, 2022 | (Bosnia and Herzegovina) Selmir Pidro | (Bosnia and Herzegovina) Sarajevo | St. Louis City SC | Transfer |
| February 1, 2022 | (Argentina) Alan Velasco | (Argentina) Independiente | FC Dallas | Transfer |
| February 2, 2022 | (Argentina) Yamil Asad | D.C. United | (Chile) Universidad Católica | Free |
| February 2, 2022 | (Jamaica) Oniel Fisher | LA Galaxy | Minnesota United FC | Free |
| February 2, 2022 | (Croatia) Marko Marić | Houston Dynamo | (Greece) Atromitos | Free |
| February 2, 2022 | (United States) DeAndre Yedlin | (Turkey) Galatasaray | Inter Miami CF | Free |
| February 3, 2022 | (Venezuela) Sergio Córdova | (Germany) FC Augsburg | Real Salt Lake | Loan |
| February 3, 2022 | (United States) Wilson Harris | Sporting Kansas City | (United States) Louisville City | Free |
| February 4, 2022 | (United States) Sebastian Berhalter | Columbus Crew | Vancouver Whitecaps FC | Trade |
| February 4, 2022 | (United States) Brooklyn Raines | (United States) El Paso Locomotive | Houston Dynamo FC | Homegrown player |
| February 5, 2022 | (United States) Ethan Dobbelaere | Seattle Sounders FC | (Czech Republic) MFK Vyškov | Loan |
| February 7, 2022 | (Brazil) Felipe | D.C. United | Austin FC | Free |
| February 7, 2022 | (Spain) Jesús Jiménez | (Poland) Górnik Zabrze | Toronto FC | Transfer |
| February 7, 2022 | (The Gambia) Kekuta Manneh | Austin FC | (United States) San Antonio FC | Free |
| February 7, 2022 | (Brazil) Thiago Martins | (Japan) Yokohama F. Marinos | New York City FC | Transfer |
| February 8, 2022 | (Ecuador) Michael Estrada | (Mexico) Toluca | D.C. United | Loan |
| February 8, 2022 | (Mexico) Josecarlos Van Rankin | (Mexico) Chivas | Portland Timbers | Loan |
| February 9, 2022 | (Argentina) Thiago Almada | (Argentina) Vélez Sarsfield | Atlanta United FC | Transfer |
| February 9, 2022 | (United States) Caden Clark | (Germany) RB Leipzig | New York Red Bulls | Loan |
| February 9, 2022 | (Switzerland) Xherdan Shaqiri | (France) Lyon | Chicago Fire FC | Transfer |
| February 10, 2022 | (Brazil) Douglas Costa | (Italy) Juventus | LA Galaxy | Loan |
| February 10, 2022 | (United States) Marco Farfan | Los Angeles FC | FC Dallas | Trade |
| February 10, 2022 | (United States) Ryan Hollingshead | FC Dallas | Los Angeles FC | Trade |
| February 10, 2022 | (Brazil) Zeca | (Brazil) Vasco da Gama | Houston Dynamo | Free |
| February 11, 2022 | (United States) CJ dos Santos | (Portugal) Benfica B | Inter Miami CF | Transfer |
| February 11, 2022 | (South Africa) Tsiki Ntsabeleng | (United States) Oregon State Beavers | FC Dallas | SuperDraft |
| February 11, 2022 | (Finland) Robert Taylor | (Norway) Brann | Inter Miami CF | Transfer |
| February 14, 2022 | (United States) Jozy Altidore | Toronto FC | New England Revolution | Free |
| February 14, 2022 | (Brazil) Auro Jr. | Toronto FC | (Brazil) Santos | Loan |
| February 14, 2022 | (Cape Verde) Jamiro Monteiro | Philadelphia Union | San Jose Earthquakes | Trade |
| February 14, 2022 | (Croatia) Roberto Punčec | Sporting Kansas City | (Bulgaria) Botev Plovdiv | Free |
| February 14, 2022 | (United States) Jackson Ragen | (United States) Tacoma Defiance | Seattle Sounders FC | Free |
| February 15, 2022 | (United States) Alex Freeman | (United States) Orlando City U17 | Orlando City SC | Homegrown player |
| February 15, 2022 | (United States) Jacob Jackson | (United States) Loyola Marymount Lions | New England Revolution | SuperDraft |
| February 15, 2022 | (Montenegro) Nikola Vujnović | (Serbia) Voždovac | Sporting Kansas City | Loan |
| February 16, 2022 | (Honduras) Kervin Arriaga | (Honduras) Marathón | Minnesota United FC | Transfer |
| February 16, 2022 | (Brazil) Luquinhas | (Poland) Legia Warsaw | New York Red Bulls | Transfer |
| February 16, 2022 | (United States) Jack Lynn | (United States) Notre Dame Fighting Irish | Orlando City SC | SuperDraft |
| February 16, 2022 | (United States) Logan Ketterer | (United States) El Paso Locomotive | CF Montréal | Free |
| February 17, 2022 | (England) Tom Edwards | (England) Stoke City | New York Red Bulls | Loan |
| February 17, 2022 | (United States) Joe Gyau | FC Cincinnati | (Sweden) Degerfors IF | Free |
| February 17, 2022 | (United States) Serge Ngoma | (United States) New York Red Bulls II | New York Red Bulls | Free |
| February 17, 2022 | (United States) Justin Rasmussen | (United States) Grand Canyon Antelopes | Portland Timbers | SuperDraft |
| February 18, 2022 | (Sweden) Oskar Ågren | (United States) Clemson Tigers | San Jose Earthquakes | SuperDraft |
| February 18, 2022 | (Canada) Doneil Henry | (South Korea) Suwon Bluewings | Los Angeles FC | Free |
| February 18, 2022 | (Sierra Leone) Kei Kamara | (Finland) HIFK | CF Montréal | Free |
| February 18, 2022 | (Netherlands) Johan Kappelhof | Chicago Fire FC | Real Salt Lake | Free |
| February 18, 2022 | (Belize) Tony Rocha | New York City FC | (United States) Orange County SC | Free |
| February 18, 2022 | (United States) Ryan Spaulding | (United States) New England Revolution II | New England Revolution | Free |
| February 19, 2022 | (Paraguay) Luis Amarilla | (Argentina) Vélez Sarsfield | Minnesota United FC | Transfer |
| February 19, 2022 | (Mexico) Jairo Torres | (Mexico) Atlas | Chicago Fire FC | Transfer |
| February 21, 2022 | (United States) Antonio Carrera | (United States) North Texas SC | FC Dallas | Free |
| February 22, 2022 | (United States) Dom Dwyer | FC Dallas | Atlanta United FC | Free |
| February 22, 2022 | (Paraguay) Erik López | Atlanta United FC | (Argentina) Banfield | Loan |
| February 22, 2022 | (United States) Koa Santos | (United States) San Diego State Aztecs | Charlotte FC | Free |
| February 23, 2022 | (United States) Charlie Asensio | (United States) Clemson Tigers | Austin FC | SuperDraft |
| February 23, 2022 | (Canada) Kadin Chung | (Canada) Pacific FC | Toronto FC | Free |
| February 23, 2022 | (United States) Nick Markanich | (United States) Northern Illinois Huskies | FC Cincinnati | SuperDraft |
| February 23, 2022 | (United States) Ian Murphy | (United States) Duke Blue Devils | FC Cincinnati | SuperDraft |
| February 25, 2022 | (United States) Kendall Burks | (United States) Washington Huskies | Chicago Fire FC | SuperDraft |
| February 25, 2022 | (France) Sofiane Djeffal | (United States) Oregon State Beavers | D.C. United | SuperDraft |
| February 25, 2022 | (United States) Diego Gutierrez | (United States) Creighton Bluejays | Portland Timbers | SuperDraft |
| February 25, 2022 | (Venezuela) Júnior Moreno | D.C. United | FC Cincinnati | Trade |
| February 25, 2022 | (Nigeria) Tani Oluwaseyi | (United States) St. John's Red Storm | Minnesota United FC | SuperDraft |
| February 25, 2022 | (Mexico) Daniel Ríos | Nashville SC | Charlotte FC | Trade |
| February 25, 2022 | (United States) Harrison Robledo | (United States) FC Cincinnati Academy | FC Cincinnati | Homegrown player |
| February 25, 2022 | (Canada) Kosi Thompson | (Canada) Toronto FC II | Toronto FC | Homegrown player |
| February 25, 2022 | (Mexico) Jürgen Damm | Atlanta United FC | Unattached | Buyout |
| February 27, 2022 | (Germany) Jasper Löeffelsend | (United States) Pittsburgh Panthers | Real Salt Lake | SuperDraft |
| February 27, 2022 | (Dominican Republic) Xavier Valdez | (United States) Houston Dynamo Academy | Houston Dynamo FC | Homegrown player |
| February 28, 2022 | (United States) Maximo Carrizo | (United States) New York City FC Academy | New York City FC | Homegrown player |
| February 28, 2022 | (England) Ashley Fletcher | (England) Watford | New York Red Bulls | Loan |
| March 1, 2022 | (United States) Matt Hundley | Colorado Rapids | Unattached | Free |
| March 3, 2022 | (United States) Anthony Markanich | (United States) Northern Illinois Huskies | Colorado Rapids | SuperDraft |
| March 3, 2022 | (Ecuador) Joshué Quiñónez | (Ecuador) Barcelona SC | FC Dallas | Loan |
| March 3, 2022 | (Canada) Luke Singh | Toronto FC | (Canada) FC Edmonton | Loan |
| March 4, 2022 | (United States) Jackson Travis | (United States) Colorado Rapids Academy | Colorado Rapids | Homegrown Player |
| March 7, 2022 | (United States) Kevin O'Toole | (United States) Princeton Tigers | New York City FC | SuperDraft |
| March 9, 2022 | (United States) Derrick Jones | Houston Dynamo | Charlotte FC | Trade |
| March 10, 2022 | (Poland) Kamil Jóźwiak | (England) Derby County | Charlotte FC | Transfer |
| March 10, 2022 | (United States) Devin Padelford | (United States) Minnesota United Academy | Minnesota United FC | Homegrown player |
| March 10, 2022 | (El Salvador) Eriq Zavaleta | Toronto FC | LA Galaxy | Free |
| March 11, 2022 | (United States) Noah Allen | Inter Miami II | Inter Miami CF | Homegrown player |
| March 11, 2022 | (Canada) Kamron Habibullah | Vancouver Whitecaps FC | (Canada) Pacific FC | Loan |
| March 12, 2022 | (United States) Freddy Kleemann | Austin FC | (United States) Birmingham Legion FC | Loan |
| March 12, 2022 | (United States) Will Pulisic | Austin FC | (United States) North Carolina FC | Loan |
| March 12, 2022 | (Canada) Jonathan Sirois | CF Montréal | (Canada) Valour FC | Loan |
| March 15, 2022 | (United States) Cody Cropper | FC Cincinnati | Vancouver Whitecaps FC | Free |
| March 17, 2022 | (Jamaica) Kemar Lawrence | Toronto FC | Minnesota United FC | Trade |
| March 17, 2022 | (Brazil) Gabriel Pereira | (Brazil) Corinthians | New York City FC | Transfer |
| March 18, 2022 | (South Korea) Kim Moon-hwan | Los Angeles FC | (South Korea) Jeonbuk Hyundai Motors | Transfer |
| March 21, 2022 | (Mexico) Ronaldo Cisneros | (Mexico) Chivas Guadalajara | Atlanta United FC | Loan |
| March 21, 2022 | (Greece) Taxiarchis Fountas | (Austria) Rapid Vienna | D.C. United | Transfer |
| March 21, 2022 | (Brazil) Thiago | (Brazil) Flamengo | Houston Dynamo FC | Loan |
| March 24, 2022 | (United States) Chris Durkin | (Belgium) Sint-Truiden | D.C. United | Transfer |
| March 24, 2022 | (The Gambia) Omar Sowe | New York Red Bulls | (Iceland) Breiðablik | Loan |
| March 28, 2022 | (Ecuador) Gustavo Vallecilla | FC Cincinnati | Colorado Rapids | Transfer |
| March 29, 2022 | (United States) Joe Corona | Houston Dynamo FC | (Sweden) GIF Sundsvall | Loan |
| April 4, 2022 | (United States) Preston Judd | (United States) LA Galaxy II | LA Galaxy | Free |
| April 5, 2022 | (Republic of Ireland) Quinn McNeill | (United States) Clemson Tigers | Charlotte FC | Transfer |
| April 5, 2022 | (Republic of Ireland) Quinn McNeill | Charlotte FC | (United States) Charlotte Independence | Loan |
| April 6, 2022 | (Serbia) Djordje Petrović | (Serbia) Čukarički | New England Revolution | Transfer |
| April 8, 2022 | (Democratic Republic of the Congo) Jojea Kwizera | (United States) Utah Valley Wolverines | CF Montréal | SuperDraft |
| April 13, 2022 | (Nigeria) Obinna Nwobodo | (Turkey) Göztepe S.K. | FC Cincinnati | Transfer |
| April 13, 2022 | (United States) Jackson Hopkins | (United States) Loudoun United | D.C. United | Homegrown Player |
| April 22, 2022 | (United States) Gyasi Zardes | Columbus Crew | Colorado Rapids | Trade |
| April 25, 2022 | (United States) Nathan Ordaz | (United States) LAFC Academy | Los Angeles FC | Homegrown player |
| April 27, 2022 | (Argentina) Rocco Ríos Novo | (Argentina) Lanús | Atlanta United FC | Loan |
| April 27, 2022 | (Venezuela) Rafael Romo | (Belgium) OH Leuven | D.C. United | Transfer |
| April 28, 2022 | (Paraguay) Andrés Cubas | (France) Nîmes | Vancouver Whitecaps FC | Free |
| April 28, 2022 | (Ecuador) Anderson Julio | (Mexico) Atlético San Luis | Real Salt Lake | Transfer |
| May 2, 2022 | (Colombia) Kerwin Vargas | (Portugal) CD Feirense | Charlotte FC | Transfer |
| May 3, 2022 | (Brazil) Andre Shinyashiki | Colorado Rapids | Charlotte FC | Trade |
| May 4, 2022 | (United States) Chase Gasper | Minnesota United FC | LA Galaxy | Trade |
| May 4, 2022 | (Switzerland) Chris Kablan | (Belgium) SK Beveren | Real Salt Lake | Loan |
| May 4, 2022 | (Portugal) Luís Martins | Sporting Kansas City | Vancouver Whitecaps FC | Free |
| May 4, 2022 | (United States) Thomas Roberts | Austria Klagenfurt | FC Dallas | Loan Return |
| May 4, 2022 | (Venezuela) Jefferson Savarino | (Brazil) Atlético Mineiro | Real Salt Lake | Transfer |
| May 5, 2022 | (Brazil) Nathan Fogaça | (Brazil) Coritiba | Portland Timbers | Transfer |
| May 5, 2022 | (Argentina) Gastón González | (Argentina) Unión Santa Fe | Orlando City SC | Transfer |
| May 5, 2022 | (Republic of Ireland) Jake Mulraney | Atlanta United FC | Orlando City SC | Trade |
| May 5, 2022 | (United States) Chris Mueller | (Scotland) Hibernian F.C. | Chicago Fire FC | Free |
| May 5, 2022 | (United States) Indiana Vassilev | (England) Aston Villa | Inter Miami CF | Loan |
| May 6, 2022 | (United States) Beto Avila | (United States) Houston Dynamo 2 | Hpuston Dynamo | Free |
| May 10, 2022 | (Panama) Adalberto Carrasquilla | (Spain) FC Cartagena | Houston Dynamo FC | Transfer |
| May 12, 2022 | (United States) Justin Reynolds | Chicago Fire Academy | Chicago Fire FC | Homegrown Player |
| May 23, 2022 | (United States) Esmir Bajraktarevic | (United States) New England Revolution II | New England Revolution | Homegrown player |
| June 1, 2022 | (United States) Ben Reveno | (United States) New England Revolution II | New England Revolution | Free |
| June 3, 2022 | (United States) Diego Luna | (United States) El Paso Locomotive | Real Salt Lake | Transfer |
| June 3, 2022 | (United States) Cruz Medina | (United States) San Jose Earthquakes Academy | San Jose Earthquakes | Homegrown player |
| June 18, 2022 | (United States) Chris Donovan | (United States) Philadelphia Union II | Philadelphia Union | Free |
| June 23, 2022 | (Peru) Edison Flores | D.C. United | (Mexico) Atlas | Transfer |
| June 27, 2022 | (Ecuador) Alan Franco | Charlotte FC | (Argentina) Talleres | Loan |
| June 28, 2022 | (Uruguay) Nicolás Mezquida | Colorado Rapids | (Greece) Volos | Transfer |
| June 28, 2022 | (Netherlands) Maarten Paes | (Netherlands) FC Utrecht | FC Dallas | Transfer |
| June 29, 2022 | (Canada) Jacen Russell-Rowe | (United States) Columbus Crew 2 | Columbus Crew | Homegrown player |
| July 1, 2022 | (Brazil) Douglas Costa | (Italy) Juventus | LA Galaxy | Free |
| July 1, 2022 | (Italy) Giorgio Chiellini | (Italy) Juventus | Los Angeles FC | Free |
| July 1, 2022 | (Mexico) Hector Herrera | (Spain) Atlético Madrid | Houston Dynamo FC | Free |
| July 1, 2022 | (France) Adrien Hunou | Minnesota United FC | (France) Angers | Transfer |
| July 1, 2022 | (Italy) Lorenzo Insigne | (Italy) Napoli | Toronto FC | Free |
| July 1, 2022 | (United States) Matt Turner | New England Revolution | (England) Arsenal | Transfer |
| July 1, 2022 | (Netherlands) Silvester van der Water | Orlando City SC | (Netherlands) Cambuur | Transfer |
| July 4, 2022 | (United States) Griffin Yow | D.C. United | (Belgium) Westerlo | Transfer |
| July 7, 2022 | (Nigeria) William Agada | (Israel) Hapoel Jerusalem | Sporting Kansas City | Transfer |
| July 7, 2022 | (Wales) Gareth Bale | (Spain) Real Madrid | Los Angeles FC | Free |
| July 7, 2022 | (Uruguay) Gastón Brugman | (Italy) Parma | LA Galaxy | Transfer |
| July 7, 2022 | (Costa Rica) Francisco Calvo | San Jose Earthquakes | (Turkey) Konyaspor | Transfer |
| July 7, 2022 | (Ecuador) Washington Corozo | (Peru) Sporting Cristal | Austin FC | Loan |
| July 7, 2022 | (Italy) Domenico Criscito | (Italy) Genoa | Toronto FC | Free |
| July 7, 2022 | (United States) Jack de Vries | Philadelphia Union | (Italy) Venezia | Transfer |
| July 7, 2022 | (Mexico) Raúl Gudiño | (Mexico) Guadalajara | Atlanta United FC | Free |
| July 7, 2022 | (Colombia) Cucho Hernández | (England) Watford | Columbus Crew | Transfer |
| July 7, 2022 | (France) Corentin Jean | (France) Lens | Inter Miami CF | Transfer |
| July 7, 2022 | (Scotland) Sam Nicholson | (England) Bristol Rovers | Colorado Rapids | Free |
| July 7, 2022 | (Spain) Alejandro Pozuelo | Toronto FC | Inter Miami CF | Trade |
| July 7, 2022 | (Mexico) Juanjo Purata | (Mexico) Tigres UANL | Atlanta United FC | Loan |
| July 7, 2022 | (Chile) Martín Rodríguez | (Turkey) Altay | D.C. United | Transfer |
| July 7, 2022 | (Germany) Erik Thommy | (Germany) VfB Stuttgart | Sporting Kansas City | Free |
| July 7, 2022 | (Albania) Giacomo Vrioni | (Italy) Juventus | New England Revolution | Transfer |
| July 7, 2022 | (United States) Tyler Wolff | Atlanta United FC | (Belgium) SK Beveren | Loan |
| July 8, 2022 | (Brazil) Matheus Aiás | Orlando City SC | (Spain) Racing Santander | Transfer |
| July 8, 2022 | (Canada) Mark-Anthony Kaye | Colorado Rapids | Toronto FC | Trade |
| July 8, 2022 | (United States) Aiden McFadden | (United States) Atlanta United 2 | Atlanta United FC | Free |
| July 8, 2022 | (Canada) Ralph Priso | Toronto FC | Colorado Rapids | Trade |
| July 8, 2022 | (Brazil) Sérgio Santos | Philadelphia Union | FC Cincinnati | Trade |
| July 9, 2022 | (Canada) Damiano Pecile | Vancouver Whitecaps FC | (Italy) Venezia | Transfer |
| July 9, 2022 | (Uganda) Steven Sserwadda | (United States) New York Red Bulls II | New York Red Bulls | Free |
| July 10, 2022 | (Poland) Adam Buksa | New England Revolution | (France) Lens | Transfer |
| July 12, 2022 | (Paraguay) Alan Benítez | (Paraguay) Cerro Porteño | Minnesota United FC | Transfer |
| July 12, 2022 | (Brazil) Everton Luiz | Real Salt Lake | (Belgium) SK Beveren | Transfer |
| July 12, 2022 | (Colombia) Edwin Mosquera | (Colombia) Independiente Medellín | Atlanta United FC | Transfer |
| July 13, 2022 | (Argentina) Julián Carranza | Inter Miami CF | Philadelphia Union | Transfer |
| July 13, 2022 | (United States) Sami Guediri | (United States) Loudoun United | D.C. United | Free |
| July 13, 2022 | (Argentina) Jonathan Menéndez | Real Salt Lake | (Argentina) Vélez Sarsfield | Loan |
| July 13, 2022 | (France) Jason Pendant | New York Red Bulls | (France) Quevilly-Rouen | Transfer |
| July 15, 2022 | (Italy) Federico Bernardeschi | (Italy) Juventus | Toronto FC | Free |
| July 15, 2022 | (Germany) Julian Gressel | D.C. United | Vancouver Whitecaps FC | Trade |
| July 15, 2022 | (Mexico) Carlos Salcedo | Toronto FC | (Mexico) Juárez | Free |
| July 19, 2022 | (Uruguay) Francisco Ginella | Los Angeles FC | (Uruguay) Nacional | Loan |
| July 19, 2022 | (Ecuador) Sebas Méndez | Orlando City SC | Los Angeles FC | Trade |
| July 19, 2022 | (United States) Shaq Moore | (Spain) CD Tenerife | Nashville SC | Transfer |
| July 20, 2022 | (Spain) Miguel Berry | Columbus Crew | D.C. United | Trade |
| July 20, 2022 | (Canada) Simon Colyn | Vancouver Whitecaps FC | (Netherlands) Jong PSV | Transfer |
| July 20, 2022 | (United States) Nicholas Gioacchini | (France) Caen | Orlando City SC | Transfer |
| July 20, 2022 | (Scotland) Stuart Findlay | Philadelphia Union | (England) Oxford United | Transfer |
| July 21, 2022 | (England) Ravel Morrison | (England) Derby County | D.C. United | Transfer |
| July 23, 2022 | (Canada) Mohamed Farsi | (United States) Columbus Crew 2 | Columbus Crew | Free |
| July 23, 2022 | (Canada) Doneil Henry | Los Angeles FC | Toronto FC | Free |
| July 25, 2022 | (Colombia) Iván Angulo | (Brazil) Palmeiras | Orlando City SC | Loan |
| July 25, 2022 | (Argentina) Valentín Castellanos | New York City FC | (Spain) Girona | Loan |
| July 25, 2022 | (Romania) Alexandru Mitriță | New York City FC | (Saudi Arabia) Al Raed | Loan |
| July 27, 2022 | (Colombia) Juan David Mosquera | (Colombia) Independiente Medellín | Portland Timbers | Transfer |
| July 27, 2022 | (Iceland) Victor Pálsson | (Germany) Schalke 04 | D.C. United | Transfer |
| July 27, 2022 | (Colombia) Nelson Quiñónes | (Colombia) Once Caldas | Houston Dynamo FC | Transfer |
| July 29, 2022 | (United States) Jozy Altidore | New England Revolution | (Mexico) Puebla | Loan |
| July 29, 2022 | (Mexico) David Ochoa | Real Salt Lake | D.C. United | Trade |
| July 29, 2022 | (Argentina) Emiliano Rigoni | (Brazil) São Paulo | Austin FC | Transfer |
| August 2, 2022 | (Peru) Wilder Cartagena | (United Arab Emirates) Ittihad Kalba | Orlando City SC | Loan |
| August 2, 2022 | (Kenya) Richard Odada | (Serbia) Red Star Belgrade | Philadelphia Union | Transfer |
| August 2, 2022 | (Canada) Jacob Shaffelburg | Toronto FC | Nashville SC | Loan |
| August 2, 2022 | (United States) Gabriel Slonina | Chicago Fire FC | (England) Chelsea | Transfer |
| August 2, 2022 | (United States) Gabriel Slonina | (England) Chelsea | Chicago Fire FC | Loan |
| August 3, 2022 | (Chile) Felipe Gutiérrez | (Chile) Universidad Católica | Colorado Rapids | Loan |
| August 3, 2022 | (United States) Sebastian Lletget | New England Revolution | FC Dallas | Trade |
| August 3, 2022 | (United States) Danny Musovski | Los Angeles FC | Real Salt Lake | Trade |
| August 3, 2022 | (United States) Brian Romero | (United States) Charlotte FC Academy | Charlotte FC | Homegrown player |
| August 3, 2022 | (Austria) Alessandro Schöpf | (Germany) Arminia Bielefeld | Vancouver Whitecaps FC | Free |
| August 4, 2022 | (Ghana) Abasa Aremeyaw | (Slovakia) Žilina | Philadelphia Union | Transfer |
| August 4, 2022 | (England) Nathan Byrne | (England) Derby County | Charlotte FC | Transfer |
| August 4, 2022 | (Venezuela) Christian Makoun | Charlotte FC | New England Revolution | Trade |
| August 4, 2022 | (Paraguay) Braian Ojeda | (England) Nottingham Forest | Real Salt Lake | Loan |
| August 4, 2022 | (Spain) Riqui Puig | (Spain) FC Barcelona | LA Galaxy | Free |
| August 4, 2022 | (Madagascar) Rayan Raveloson | LA Galaxy | (France) AJ Auxerre | Transfer |
| August 4, 2022 | (Portugal) Nuno Santos | (Portugal) Benfica | Charlotte FC | Transfer |
| August 5, 2022 | (Equatorial Guinea) Carlos Akapo | (Spain) Cádiz CF | San Jose Earthquakes | Transfer |
| August 5, 2022 | (Belgium) Christian Benteke | (England) Crystal Palace | D.C. United | Transfer |
| August 5, 2022 | (Gabon) Denis Bouanga | (France) Saint-Étienne | Los Angeles FC | Transfer |
| August 5, 2022 | (Senegal) Clément Diop | Inter Miami CF | New England Revolution | Trade |
| August 5, 2022 | (United States) Kyle Duncan | (Belgium) Oostende | New York Red Bulls | Loan |
| August 5, 2022 | (Colombia) Ménder García | (Colombia) Once Caldas | Minnesota United FC | Transfer |
| August 5, 2022 | (Canada) Richie Laryea | (England) Nottingham Forest | Toronto FC | Loan |
| August 5, 2022 | (Nigeria) Chinonso Offor | Chicago Fire FC | CF Montréal | Trade |
| August 5, 2022 | (Costa Rica) Bryan Oviedo | (Denmark) FC Copenhagen | Real Salt Lake | Free |
| August 5, 2022 | (Libya) Ismael Tajouri-Shradi | Los Angeles FC | New England Revolution | Trade |
| August 6, 2022 | (Brazil) Elias Manoel | (Brazil) Grêmio | New York Red Bulls | Loan |
| August 6, 2022 | (Brazil) Rodrigues | (Brazil) Grêmio | San Jose Earthquakes | Loan |
| August 7, 2022 | (Ghana) Isaac Atanga | FC Cincinnati | (Turkey) Göztepe | Loan |
| August 7, 2022 | (Mexico) Jonathan González | (Mexico) C.F. Monterrey | Minnesota United FC | Loan |
| August 8, 2022 | (Peru) Marcos López | San Jose Earthquakes | (Netherlands) Feyenoord | Transfer |
| August 9, 2022 | (Romania) Alexandru Mățan | Columbus Crew | (Romania) Rapid București | Loan |
| August 9, 2022 | (Spain) Sergio Ruiz | Charlotte FC | (Spain) Granada | Transfer |
| August 10, 2022 | (Canada) Tyler Pasher | Houston Dynamo FC | New York Red Bulls | Waivers |
| August 10, 2022 | (Iceland) Arnór Ingvi Traustason | New England Revolution | (Sweden) IFK Norrköping | Free |
| August 16, 2022 | (Brazil) Caio Alexandre | Vancouver Whitecaps FC | (Brazil) Fortaleza | Loan |
| August 19, 2022 | (Somalia) Handwalla Bwana | Nashville SC | (United States) Memphis 901 | Loan |
| August 19, 2022 | (Argentina) Matías Pellegrini | Inter Miami CF | New York City FC | Waivers |
| August 22, 2022 | (United States) Evan Louro | Unattached | FC Cincinnati | Free |
| August 23, 2022 | (Spain) Nacho Gil | (Spain) FC Cartagena | New England Revolution | Free |
| August 23, 2022 | (Republic of Ireland) Harvey Neville | (United States) Inter Miami II | Inter Miami CF | Free |
| August 23, 2022 | (United States) Jeremy Rafanello | (United States) New York Red Bulls II | Philadelphia Union | Homegrown player |
| August 24, 2022 | (Uruguay) Martín Cáceres | (Spain) Levante | LA Galaxy | Free |
| August 24, 2022 | (Uruguay) Brian Rodríguez | Los Angeles FC | (Mexico) Club América | Transfer |
| August 25, 2022 | (Senegal) Mamadou Fall | Los Angeles FC | (Spain) Villarreal | Loan |
| August 26, 2022 | (United States) Matt Nocita | (United States) Navy Midshipmen | New York Red Bulls | SuperDraft |
| August 26, 2022 | (Hungary) Szabolcs Schön | FC Dallas | (Hungary) Fehérvár | Transfer |
| August 26, 2022 | (Spain) Cristian Tello | (Spain) Real Betis | Los Angeles FC | Free |
| August 29, 2022 | (United States) Moses Nyeman | D.C. United | (Belgium) S.K. Beveren | Transfer |
| August 30, 2022 | (Tanzania) Bernard Kamungo | (United States) North Texas SC | FC Dallas | Free |
| August 31, 2022 | (United States) Matai Akinmboni | (United States) Loudoun United | D.C. United | Homegrown player |
| September 2, 2022 | (Peru) Miguel Trauco | (France) Saint-Étienne | San Jose Earthquakes | Free |
| September 3, 2022 | (Cameroon) Hassan Ndam | (United States) New York Red Bulls II | New York Red Bulls | Free |
