= Tomas Gomez (soccer) =

American soccer player (born 1993)

Personal information
- Date of birth: May 20, 1993 (age 33)
- Place of birth: Montemorelos, Mexico
- Height: 6 ft 2 in (1.88 m)
- Position: Goalkeeper

Youth career
- –2006: Gateway Strikers
- 2006–2011: St. Louis Scott Gallagher

College career
Years	Team	Apps	(Gls)
2011–2014	Georgetown Hoyas	81	(0)

Senior career*
Years	Team	Apps	(Gls)
2013–2014	Orlando City U-23	14	(0)
2015	San Jose Earthquakes	0	(0)
2016–2017	Rochester Rhinos	38	(0)
2018–2019	Saint Louis FC	36	(0)
2020	Pittsburgh Riverhounds	8	(0)
2021	Sacramento Republic	19	(0)
2022–2024	Real Salt Lake	0	(0)
2022–2024	→ Real Monarchs (loan)	5	(0)

International career
2011–2012	United States U20		
- * Club domestic league appearances and goals as of May 19, 2025

Tomas Gomez (born May 20, 1993) is an American professional soccer player who plays as a goalkeeper.

== Career ==
=== College and amateur ===
Gomez played four years of college soccer at Georgetown University between 2011 and 2014.

Gomez also played with Orlando City U-23 in 2013 to 2014.

=== Professional ===
On January 20, 2015, Gomez was selected in the third round (60th overall) of the 2015 MLS SuperDraft by Columbus Crew. He wasn't signed by Columbus, instead joining San Jose Earthquakes on March 26, 2015.

After his release from San Jose, Gomez signed with United Soccer League side Rochester Rhinos in March 2016.

After spells with Saint Louis FC and Pittsburgh Riverhounds, Gomez joined USL Championship side Sacramento Republic in January 2021. Gomez was released by Sacramento following the 2021 season.

In February 2022, Gomez joined MLS Next Pro club Real Monarchs. He was named to the bench for the club's parent team, Real Salt Lake, on February 27, 2022, in a fixture against Houston Dynamo.

He has a brother Sam Gomez who plays for St. Louis City 2.
