= Zackery Farnsworth =

American soccer player (born 2002)

Personal information
- Full name: Zackery Farnsworth
- Date of birth: July 13, 2002 (age 24)
- Place of birth: Cedar Hills, Utah, United States
- Height: 6 ft 1 in (1.85 m)
- Position: Defender

Team information
- Current team: Monterey Bay
- Number: 32

Youth career
- 2016–2021: Real Salt Lake

Senior career*
| Years | Team | Apps | (Gls) |
| 2020–2025 | Real Monarchs | 66 | (0) |
| 2025 | Real Salt Lake | 0 | (0) |
| 2026– | Monterey Bay | 27 | (2) |
- * Club domestic league appearances and goals as of 18:50, 9 November 2026 (UTC)

Zackery Farnsworth (born July 13, 2002) is an American soccer player who plays as a defender for USL Championship side Monterey Bay FC.

== Career ==
Farnsworth appeared for USL Championship side Real Monarchs as an academy player on July 11, 2020, starting in a 1–0 loss to San Diego Loyal.

On June 17, 2021, Farnsworth signed as a homegrown player with Real Salt Lake.

On February 13, 2026, Monterey Bay FC signed Farnsworth to a multiyear contract.
