= Chris Kablan =

Swiss footballer (born 1994)

Personal information
- Full name: Chris Antoine Elogne Kablan
- Date of birth: 30 November 1994 (age 31)
- Place of birth: Lucerne, Switzerland
- Height: 1.76 m (5 ft 9 in)
- Position: Left back

Team information
- Current team: Zürich
- Number: 22

Youth career
- 2000–2014: Zürich

Senior career*
| Years | Team | Apps | (Gls) |
| 2012–2014 | Luzern U21 | 7 | (0) |
| 2013–2014 | → Kriens (loan) | 17 | (0) |
| 2014–2017 | Kriens | 73 | (11) |
| 2017–2021 | Thun | 107 | (8) |
| 2021–2023 | Beveren | 26 | (2) |
| 2022 | → Real Salt Lake (loan) | 2 | (0) |
| 2022 | → Real Monarchs (loan) | 3 | (0) |
| 2023–2024 | Lausanne-Sport | 21 | (1) |
| 2025–2026 | Akritas Chlorakas | 10 | (1) |
| 2026– | Zürich | 14 | (0) |
- * Club domestic league appearances and goals as of 28 September 2026

Chris Antoine Elogne Kablan (born 30 November 1994) is a Swiss professional footballer who plays as a left back for Zürich.

== Professional career ==
Kablan made his professional debut for Thun in a 1–2 Swiss Super League loss to FC Zürich on 30 July 2017.

On 17 June 2021, Kablan signed with recently relegated Belgian First Division B club Waasland-Beveren. The move reunited him with his former Thun coach Marc Schneider.

On 24 January 2023, Kablan returned to Switzerland and signed with Lausanne-Sport.

He returned to FC Zürich in January 2026, signing a one-year contract.

== Personal life ==
Kablan was born in Switzerland to an Ivorian father and a Swiss mother. He also holds French citizenship.
