= Pablo Ruiz (footballer, born 1998) =

Argentine footballer (born 1998)

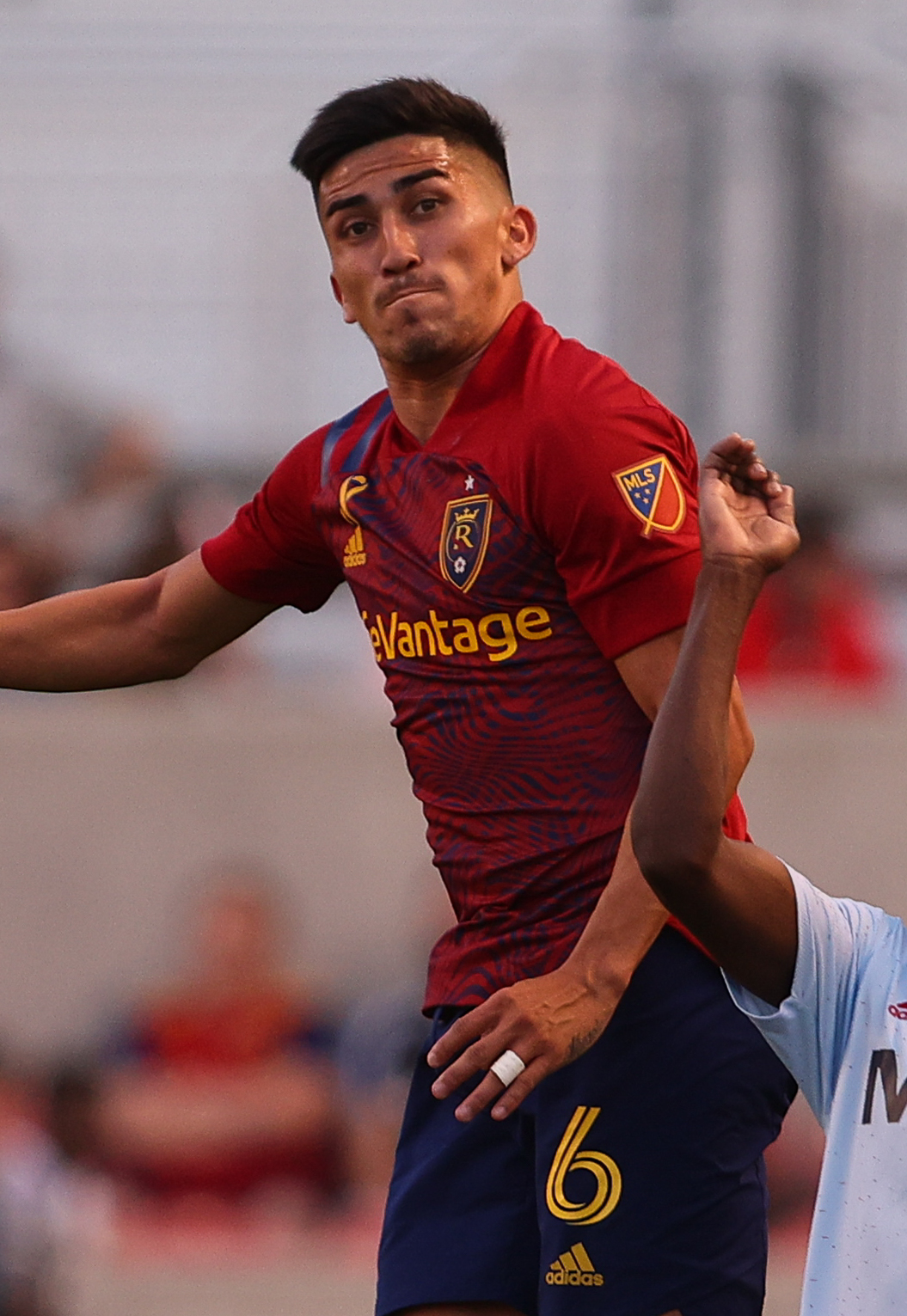
- Ruíz with Real Salt Lake in 2021

Personal information
- Full name: Pablo Enrique Ruiz
- Date of birth: 20 December 1998 (age 27)
- Place of birth: Comodoro Rivadavia, Argentina
- Height: 1.72 m (5 ft 8 in)
- Position: Midfielder

Team information
- Current team: LA Galaxy
- Number: 17

Youth career
- C.A.I.
- 2014–2017: San Lorenzo

Senior career*
Years	Team	Apps	(Gls)
2017–2018	San Luis	10	(0)
2018–2026	Real Salt Lake	142	(7)
2018–2019	→ Real Monarchs (loan)	11	(0)
2019	→ Pinzgau Saalfelden (loan)	15	(9)
2026	→ Real Monarchs (loan)	1	(0)
2026–	LA Galaxy	4	(1)

International career^{‡}
2015	Argentina U17	10	(2)
- * Club domestic league appearances and goals as of 3 September 2026 ‡ National team caps and goals as of 25 March 2018

Pablo Enrique Ruiz (born December 20, 1998) is an Argentine professional footballer who plays as a midfielder for Major League Soccer club LA Galaxy.

== Club career ==
A midfielder, Ruiz was with Comisión de Actividades Infantiles from his hometown before joining the San Lorenzo youth system in 2014. In 2017, he moved to Chile and joined San Luis de Quillota.

On 2 February 2018, Ruíz joined MLS team Real Salt Lake from San Luis in Chile. On 1 November 2020, he signed a contract extension through the end of 2025 MLS season.

On 3 September 2026, Ruiz signed with LA Galaxy on a deal until December of the same year with club options for 2027 and 2028.

== International career ==
He represented Argentina U17 at the 2015 South American Championship. At senior level, he is eligible for both Argentina and Chile.

== Personal life ==
His parents are Argentine and his grandparents are Chilean. Due to his Chilean heritage, he acquired the Chilean nationality by descent before joining San Luis de Quillota at the end of 2016.
