= Jude Wellings =

American soccer player (born 2006)

Personal information
- Date of birth: April 26, 2006 (age 20)
- Place of birth: Birmingham, Michigan, United States
- Height: 6 ft 2 in (1.88 m)
- Position: Midfielder

Youth career
- 2020–2022: Real Salt Lake

Senior career*
Years	Team	Apps	(Gls)
2021–2025	Real Monarchs	35	(1)
2022–2025	Real Salt Lake	0	(0)
2024	→ Pinzgau Saalfelden (loan)	7	(0)

International career^{‡}
2022	United States U17	3	(0)
- * Club domestic league appearances and goals as of December 28, 2025 ‡ National team caps and goals as of May 10, 2022

Jude Wellings (born April 26, 2006) is an American professional soccer player who plays as a midfielder.

== Club career ==
=== Youth ===
Wellings joined the Real Salt Lake academy in the summer of 2020. Wellings went on to captain the under-15's team that went on to win the 2021 MLS NEXT Cup, then transitioned to the under-17 level, scoring five goals and tallying two assists in 12 appearances, and was named MLS NEXT Best Player of the Tournament. He made two appearances for Salt Lake's USL Championship affiliate side Real Monarchs during their 2021 season, debuting as a 74th-minute substitute during a 1–3 loss to Rio Grande Valley FC on October 27, 2021.

=== Real Salt Lake ===
On January 10, 2022, Wellings signed a homegrown player deal with Real Salt Lake through to 2025, with a club option to extend to 2026.

=== Loan at FC Pinzgau Saalfelden ===
On 26 August 2024, Wellings joined Austrian Regionalliga side Pinzgau Saalfelden on loan.

== Career statistics ==
As of match played January 22, 2022

Appearances and goals by club, season and competition
Club	Season	League			National cup		Other		Total	
Club	Season	Division	Apps	Goals	Apps	Goals	Apps	Goals	Apps	Goals
Real Monarchs	2021	USL Championship	2	0	—		—		2	0
Career total			2	0	0	0	0	0	2	0
