= Axel Kei =

Ivorian footballer (born 2007)

Personal information
- Full name: Havelange Beni De Dieu Kei Wonflonhi Jean-Désiré
- Date of birth: 30 December 2007 (age 18)
- Place of birth: Abidjan, Ivory Coast
- Height: 1.85 m (6 ft 1 in)
- Position: Striker

Youth career
- 2018–2020: LA Galaxy San Diego
- 2020–2022: Real Salt Lake

Senior career*
Years	Team	Apps	(Gls)
2021–2025	Real Monarchs	22	(4)
2022–2025	Real Salt Lake	1	(0)
- * Club domestic league appearances and goals as of December 5, 2023

Havelange Beni De Dieu Kei Wonflonhi Jean-Désiré (born 30 December 2007), known as just Axel Kei, is an Ivorian professional footballer who plays as a striker.

== Club career ==
Kei joined the Real Salt Lake Academy in 2020 after transferring from the San Diego Youth Soccer Club, a youth organization run by the LA Galaxy. He won the MLS Next Cup U15 Golden Boot on 13 July 2021, in the academy's winning campaign at the MLS Next Cup. On 8 October 2021, he debuted with the Real Monarchs in a 0–0 USL Championship draw with Colorado Springs Switchbacks FC, coming on in the 61st minute. Kei's appearance at the age of 13 years, 8 months and 9 days made him the youngest professional athlete in American team sport history.

Kei signed a Major League Soccer contract with Real Salt Lake on 14 January 2022. At 14 years and 15 days old, Kei became the youngest signing in MLS history, breaking the record Freddy Adu had held for eighteen years. Kei made his debut for the club on 22 September 2022 during a friendly against Mexican club Atlas FC. He entered the match at half-time as a substitute. Kei was waived by Salt Lake on 31 July 2025.

== International career ==
Born in the Ivory Coast, Kei was raised in Brazil, and moved to San Diego in 2017. He was called up to a training United States youth training camp in February 2019.
