= Jasper Löffelsend =

German footballer (born 1997)

Personal information
- Date of birth: 10 September 1997 (age 29)
- Place of birth: Cologne, Germany
- Height: 1.70 m (5 ft 7 in)
- Positions: Defender; midfielder

Team information
- Current team: Fortuna Köln
- Number: 13

Youth career
- –2013: SV Bergisch Gladbach 09
- 2013–2014: SV Union Rösrath
- 2014–2016: TV Herkenrath 09

College career
Years	Team	Apps	(Gls)
2020–2021	Pittsburgh Panthers	36	(2)

Senior career*
Years	Team	Apps	(Gls)
2016–2018	TV Herkenrath 09	39	(1)
2019	SV Straelen	7	(0)
2019–2020	Bonner SC	8	(0)
2020	FC Hennef 05	2	(0)
2020	FC Wegberg-Beeck	0	(0)
2022	Real Monarchs	0	(0)
2022–2023	Real Salt Lake	51	(2)
2024	Colorado Rapids	18	(0)
2024	Colorado Rapids 2	3	(0)
2025	San Diego FC	12	(0)
2025–2026	ŁKS Łódź	33	(5)
2026–	Fortuna Köln	0	(0)
- * Club domestic league appearances and goals as of 15:42, 29 May 2026 (UTC)

Jasper Löffelsend (born 10 September 1997) is a German professional footballer who plays as a midfielder for 3. Liga club Fortuna Köln.

== Career ==
=== Early career ===
Löffelsend played with various teams at youth level, including spells at SV Bergisch Gladbach 09, SV Union Rösrath and TV Herkenrath 09. Following his time at Herkenrath, he had short spells with SV Straelen, Bonner SC, FC Hennef 05 and FC Wegberg-Beeck, appearing for the teams in both the Regionalliga West and Mittelrheinliga. After signing with Wegberg-Beeck in July 2020, Löffelsend and the club mutually agreed to terminate his contract to allow him to accept a scholarship to play college soccer in the United States.

=== College ===
Löffelsend attended the University of Pittsburgh in 2020, where he played two seasons, making a total of 36 appearances, scoring two goals and tallying 19 assists. In his two seasons with the Panthers, he was named All-ACC First Team twice, ACC Defensive Player of the Year twice, was a MAC Hermann Trophy semi-finalist twice, TopDrawerSoccer Best XI First Team, United Soccer Coaches South All-Region First Team twice, United Soccer Coaches Second Team All-America twice, and College Soccer News First Team All-America.

=== Real Salt Lake ===
On 11 January 2022, Löffelsend was selected 81st overall in the 2022 MLS SuperDraft by Real Salt Lake. On 22 February 2022, he signed with Salt Lake's MLS Next Pro side Real Monarchs. However, on 27 February 2022, it was announced that Löffelsend had signed a one-year deal with Real Salt Lake's first team who compete in Major League Soccer. He made his debut for the club the same day, appearing as an injury-time substitute during a 0–0 draw with Houston Dynamo.

=== Colorado Rapids ===
On 10 January 2024, Colorado Rapids signed Löffelsend from Real Salt Lake in exchange for Colorado’s natural second-round pick in the 2025 MLS SuperDraft pick and a 2024 International Roster Slot.

=== San Diego FC ===
On 11 December 2024, San Diego FC drafted Löffelsend from Colorado Rapids in the 2024 MLS Expansion Draft. Löffelsend and San Diego mutually agreed to terminate his contract on 16 July 2025.

=== ŁKS Łódź ===
Later that day, Löffelsend signed a season-long deal with Polish second tier club ŁKS Łódź, with an option for another year.

=== Fortuna Köln ===
On 17 July 2026, Löffelsend returned to Germany and signed with Fortuna Köln in 3. Liga.
