= 2021 Real Salt Lake season =

American soccer team season

Real Salt Lake
2021 season
- Head coach: Freddy Juarez (until August 27); Pablo Mastroeni (as interim; from August 27)
- Stadium: Rio Tinto Stadium
- Major League Soccer: Conference: 7th Overall: 13th
- MLS Cup Playoffs: Western Conference Finals
- U.S. Open Cup: Cancelled
- Rocky Mountain Cup: Winners
- Top goalscorer: League: All: Damir Kreilach (16)
- Highest home attendance: 20,738 (Oct 16 vs COL)
- Lowest home attendance: 9,842 (May 1 vs SKC)
- Average home league attendance: 15,253
- Biggest win: VAN 0–4 RSL (7/7)
- Biggest defeat: POR 6–1 RSL (9/25)
Home colors	Away colors

The 2021 Real Salt Lake season was the team's 17th year of existence, and their 17th consecutive season in Major League Soccer, the top division of the American soccer pyramid. RSL entered the 2021 season looking to rebound from a tumultuous 2020 season, having finished near the bottom of the table and endured the challenges of the COVID-19 pandemic. The pandemic continued to have a significant impact on MLS in 2021, causing the season's start to be delayed to mid-April instead of the traditional first weekend in March, a reworked schedule that focused heavily on intra-conference play to reduce travel, and stadiums at reduced capacity. The state of Utah allowed RSL to open the season with Rio Tinto Stadium at 50% capacity. The 2021 Major League Soccer season began on April 16, 2021, though RSL did not begin their season until the following week, April 24, having had a bye in the opening weekend due to the odd number of teams in MLS in 2021.

RSL's offseason was marked by the retirements of several key players, including long time captain Kyle Beckerman. The club's ownership was also in question, as Dell Loy Hansen had agreed to sell the club following allegations of racism directed at club players and employees. The pending sale of the club resulted in a relatively quiet offseason on the signing front, with most of the clubs new signings coming from the club's own USL Championship team, Real Monarchs.

RSL entered the season with low expectations, with most pre-season projections predicting a near last place finish. Despite this, RSL opened the season with two straight wins, including a road win at Minnesota. They would go on to spend much of the spring and summer hovering at or just above the playoff line. In a surprising move, head coach Freddy Juarez departed the club on August 27 to take a position as an assistant coach to Brian Schmetzer in Seattle. Assistant coach Pablo Mastroeni took over the head coaching position on an interim basis. Under Mastroeni's leadership, the club saw mixed form, rarely winning or losing consecutive matches. RSL qualified for the 2021 MLS Cup Playoffs on the last matchday of the season, or "Decision Day," following a 1–0 road win against Sporting Kansas City. All-star forward Damir Kreilach scored the go-ahead goal in the 90+5" minute of the game, essentially saving the club's season with the final kick of the regular season. The result ensured RSL the 7th and final spot in the playoffs, subsequently eliminating the LA Galaxy, as RSL held the first points tiebreaker, total wins.

== Competitions ==
=== Preseason ===
April 3, 2021	Colorado Rapids	0–3	Real Salt Lake	Tucson, Arizona
19:00 MST			Julio 12'; Kreilach 44' (pen.), 77'	Stadium: Kino Sports Complex

April 7, 2021	Phoenix Rising	0–1	Real Salt Lake	Tucson, Arizona
7:00 PM MT			Rusnák 26'; Ramírez (yellow card) 68'	Stadium: Kino Sports Complex

April 10, 2021	Real Salt Lake	0–1	LA Galaxy	Tucson, Arizona
6:00 MT	Toia (yellow card) 75'; Herrera (yellow card) 86'		Vázquez 43'	Stadium: Kino Sports Complex; Referee: Tim Ford

=== MLS regular season ===
==== April ====
April 24, 2021 1	Minnesota United FC	1–2	Real Salt Lake	Saint Paul, Minnesota
6:00 PM MT	Lod 86'	Report	Luiz (yellow card) 24'; Julio 31, 41'; Ruiz (yellow card) 35'; Meram (yellow card) 73'	Stadium: Allianz Field; Attendance: 4,100; Referee: Drew Fischer

May 1, 2021 2	Real Salt Lake	3–1	Sporting Kansas City	Sandy, Utah
12:00 PM MT	Ruiz (yellow card) 31'; Kreilach 35'; Rubin 53, 77'; Chang (yellow card) 79'	Report	Pulido 17'	Stadium: Rio Tinto Stadium; Attendance: 9,842; Referee: David Gantar

May 7, 2021 3	Real Salt Lake	1–2	San Jose Earthquakes	Sandy, Utah
7:30 PM MT	Kreilach (yellow card) 1'; Rubin 43'; Rusnák (yellow card) 49'; Meram (yellow card) 50'; Besler (yellow card) 86'	Report	Remedi (yellow card) 21'; Wondolowski 83, 87'	Stadium: Rio Tinto Stadium; Attendance: 10,448; Referee: Fotis Bazakos
Note: Rubin's goal in the 43rd minute for Real Salt Lake was declared MLS goal of the week for week 4 of regular season play and was voted for the MLS Goal of the Year Award during the postseason.

May 15, 2021 4	Real Salt Lake	0–0	Nashville SC	Sandy, Utah
7:30 PM MT	Glad (yellow card) 27'	Report	Muyl (yellow card) 50'	Stadium: Rio Tinto Stadium; Attendance: 10,555; Referee: Marcos DeOliviera

May 22, 2021 5	FC Dallas	2–2	Real Salt Lake	Frisco, Texas
6:00 PM MT	Ricaurte (yellow card) 24'; Jara 43' (pen.); Bressan (yellow card) 69'; Hollingshead 83'	Report	Rubin 20'; Kreilach 86'; Glad (yellow card) 89'; Herrera (yellow card) 90+2'; Rusnák (yellow card) 90+4'	Stadium: Toyota Stadium; Attendance: 8,621; Referee: Joe Dickerson

May 29, 2021 6	Real Salt Lake	1–1	Minnesota United FC	Sandy, Utah
7:30 PM MT	Kreilach 13'	Report	Hansen 78'	Stadium: Rio Tinto Stadium; Attendance: 10,853; Referee: Jair Marrufo

==== June ====
June 18, 2021 7	Real Salt Lake	3–1	Vancouver Whitecaps FC	Sandy, Utah
8:00 PM MT	Silva (yellow card) 12'; Kreilach 43, 90+5'; Meram (yellow card) 85'; Herrera (yellow card) 89'; Holt 90+2' (yellow card) 90+7'	Report	Brown (yellow card) 3'; White 54'	Stadium: Rio Tinto Stadium; Attendance: 15,109; Referee: Rubiel Vazquez

June 23, 2021 8	Seattle Sounders FC	2–1	Real Salt Lake	Seattle, Washington
8:00 PM MT	C. Roldan 58'; Ruidíaz (yellow card) 76' (goal) 88' (pen.)	Report	Luiz (yellow card) 39'; Rusnák 79' (pen.); Ochoa (yellow card) 88'; Ruíz (yellow card) 90+6'	Stadium: Lumen Field; Attendance: 24,652; Referee: Ted Unkel

June 26, 2021 9	Real Salt Lake	1–1	Houston Dynamo FC	Sandy, Utah
6:00 PM MT	Glad 11'	Report	Vera (yellow card) 42'; Urruti 52' (yellow card) 66'; Cerén (yellow card) 84'	Stadium: Rio Tinto Stadium; Attendance: 13,588; Referee: Nima Saghafi

==== July ====
July 3, 2021 10	Real Salt Lake	0–1	Los Angeles FC	Sandy, Utah
8:00 PM MT	Brody (yellow card) 17'; Kreilach (yellow card) 75'; Glad (yellow card) 83'	Report	Baird (yellow card) 61'; Cifuentes 69'; Rossi (yellow card) 90+6'	Stadium: Rio Tinto Stadium; Attendance: 18,253; Referee: Silviu Petrescu

July 7, 2021 11	Vancouver Whitecaps FC	0–4	Real Salt Lake	Sandy, Utah
8:00 PM MT		Report	Kreilach 1, 57'; Ruíz (yellow card) 24'; Rusnák 74' (pen.); Toia (yellow card) 81'; Julio 90+4'	Stadium: Rio Tinto Stadium; Attendance: 12,009; Referee: Alex Chilowicz
Note: Vancouver Whitecaps FC is currently playing home matches at Rio Tinto Stadium (Where Real Salt Lake plays) since the start of the 2021 season because of border restrictions between the United States and Canada due to the COVID-19 pandemic. Vancouver will play as the home team for this match.

July 17, 2021 12	Los Angeles FC	2–1	Real Salt Lake	Los Angeles, California
8:30 PM MT	Rossi 10'; Murillo (yellow card) 62'; Vela 79'	Report	Herrera 18' (yellow card) 77'; Luiz (yellow card) 45+1'; Kreilach (yellow card) 50'; Besler (yellow card) 87'	Stadium: Banc of California Stadium; Attendance: 22,490; Referee: Robert Sibiga

July 21, 2021 13	Real Salt Lake	2–2	LA Galaxy	Sandy, Utah
8:00 PM MT	Rusnák 9'; Chang 25'	Report	Vázquez 33'; Raveloson (yellow card) 71', (goal) 77'; Kljestan (yellow card) 90+2'	Stadium: Rio Tinto Stadium; Attendance: 16,169; Referee: Kevin Stott

July 24, 2021 14 RMC	Real Salt Lake	3–0	Colorado Rapids	Sandy, Utah
8:00 PM MT	Yarbrough 14' (o.g.); Wood 30'; Morgan (yellow card) 61'; Rubin 76'; Kreilach (yellow card) 88'	Report	Wilson (yellow card) 23'; Shinyashiki (yellow card) 45+2'; Abubakar (yellow card) 65'	Stadium: Rio Tinto Stadium; Attendance: 17,325; Referee: Fotis Bazakos

July 31, 2021 15	Houston Dynamo FC	0–0	Real Salt Lake	Houston, Texas
6:30 PM MT		Report	Glad (yellow card) 40' (yellow-red card) 87'; Holt (yellow card) 90+2'	Stadium: BBVA Stadium; Attendance: 13,462; Referee: Guido Gonzalez Jr.

==== August ====
August 4, 2021 16	LA Galaxy	1–0	Real Salt Lake	Carson, California
8:30 PM MT	Álvarez 53'	Report	Besler (yellow card) 35'; Toia (yellow card) 70'; Meram (yellow card) 85'	Stadium: Dignity Health Sports Park; Attendance: 15,544; Referee: Nima Saghafi

August 7, 2021 17	Portland Timbers	3–2	Real Salt Lake	Portland, Oregon
8:30 PM MT	Asprilla 10' (pen.); Chará 29'; Mora 62'; Valeri (yellow card) 89'	Report	Glad (yellow card) 6'; Menéndez (yellow card) 13'; Rusnák 40'; Luiz (yellow card) 45+1'; Herrera (yellow card) 48'; Kreilach 80'; Chang (yellow card) 87'	Stadium: Providence Park; Attendance: 23,577; Referee: Rosendo Mendoza

August 14, 2021 18	Real Salt Lake	1–0	Austin FC	Sandy, Utah
8:00 PM MT	Wood 32'; Morgan (yellow card) 68'	Report	Ring (yellow card) 44'; Cascante (red card) 49'	Stadium: Rio Tinto Stadium; Attendance: 17,506; Referee: David Gantar

August 18, 2021 19	Real Salt Lake	2–1	Houston Dynamo FC	Sandy, Utah
8:00 PM MT	Meram 6'; Kreilach (yellow card) 29'; Julio 88'; Rusnák (yellow card) 90'	Report	Picault 51'	Stadium: Rio Tinto Stadium; Attendance: 13,570; Referee: Jair Marrufo

August 21, 2021 20 RMC	Colorado Rapids	2–1	Real Salt Lake	Commerce City, Colorado
7:00 PM MT	Rubio 64'; Kaye 71'; Galván (yellow card) 85'	Report	Toia (yellow card) 3'; Rusnák 51'; Menéndez (yellow card) 56'; Meram (yellow card) 85'; Kreilach (yellow card) 90+3'	Stadium: Dick's Sporting Goods Park; Attendance: 13,134; Referee: Drew Fischer

August 29, 2021 21	Vancouver Whitecaps FC	4–1	Real Salt Lake	Vancouver, British Columbia
7:00 PM MT	Silva 33' (o.g.); Brown (yellow card) 40'; White 53'; Gauld 64'; Jungwirth 69'	Report	Powder (yellow card) 34'; Rusnák (yellow card) 53'; Silva (yellow card) 55'; Julio 90'	Stadium: BC Place; Referee: Ramy Touchan

==== September ====
September 4, 2021 22	Real Salt Lake	3–2	FC Dallas	Sandy, Utah
7:00PM CDT (UTC-05)	Glad 42'; Herrera (yellow card) 45+2'; Menéndez 54'; Rusnák (yellow card) 65', (goal) 73'	Report	Jara 19'; Obrian (yellow card) 25'; Tafari (yellow card) 49'; Ferreira 80'	Stadium: Rio Tinto Stadium; Attendance: 15,882; Referee: Baldomero Toledo

September 12, 2021 23	Los Angeles FC	3–2	Real Salt Lake	Los Angeles, California
8:30 PM MT	Arango 1', 30'; Edwards (yellow card) 23'; Duke (yellow card) 57'; Datković 59' (o.g); Ibeagha (yellow card) 90+3'	Report	Datković (yellow card) 22'; Kreilach 28'; Everton (yellow card) 45+1'; Julio 48'	Stadium: Banc of California Stadium; Attendance: 22,130; Referee: Ted Unkel

September 15, 2021 24	San Jose Earthquakes	3–4	Real Salt Lake	San Jose, California
8:30 PM MT	López 26', 50', 65' (yellow card) 69'; Judson (yellow card) 59'; Remedi (yellow card) 72'	Report	Besler (yellow card) 8'; Rubin 45+2', 81'; Rusnák 49' (yellow card) 62'; Ruíz (yellow card) 67'; Meram 71'; Kreilach (yellow card) 75'; Toia (yellow card) 90'	Stadium: PayPal Park; Attendance: 9,636; Referee: Nima Saghafi

September 18, 2021 25	Real Salt Lake	1–0	Seattle Sounders FC	Sandy, Utah
7:00 PM MT	Luiz (yellow card) 33'; Kreilach (yellow card) 41' (goal) 48'; Herrera (yellow card) 53'; Julio (yellow card) 85'	Report	Cissoko (yellow card) 45'	Stadium: Rio Tinto Stadium; Attendance: 19,850; Referee: Ismail Elfath

September 25, 2021 26	Portland Timbers	6–1	Real Salt Lake	Portland, Oregon
8:30 PM MT	Mora 27'; Asprilla 36'; Y. Chara (yellow card) 45+4', (goal) 48'; D. Chara 68'; Niezgoda 85'; Paredes 88'	Report	Kreilach 41'; Ruíz (yellow card) 51'; Glad (yellow card) 73'	Stadium: Providence Park; Attendance: 21,579; Referee: Fotis Bazakos

September 29, 2021 27	Real Salt Lake	2–1	LA Galaxy	Sandy, Utah
7:30 PM MT	Kreilach 45'; Julio 90+5'	Report	DePuy (yellow card) 46'; Chicharito 76'	Stadium: Rio Tinto Stadium; Attendance: 18,121; Referee: Tori Penso

==== October ====
October 2, 2021 28	Austin FC	2–1	Real Salt Lake	Austin, Texas
1:30 PM MT	Domínguez 17', 55'; Pereira (yellow card) 90+2'	Report	Kreilach 64'	Stadium: Q2 Stadium; Referee: Rosendo Mendoza

October 16, 2021 29 RMC	Real Salt Lake	3–1	Colorado Rapids	Sandy, Utah
7:30 PM MT	Kreilach 13'; Rubin 56'; Holt (yellow card) 61'; Ochoa (yellow card) 90+6'; Julio 90+6'	Report	Warner (yellow card) 22'; Price (yellow card) 31'; Rubio (yellow card) 65'; Namli 73'	Stadium: Rio Tinto Stadium; Attendance: 20,738; Referee: Kevin Stott
Note: This game was the final matchup of the 2021 MLS Season between RSL and the Colorado Rapids to compete for the Rocky Mountain Cup with a combined score of RSL winning 7–3

October 23, 2021 30	Chicago Fire FC	1–0	Real Salt Lake	Chicago, Illinois
6:00 PM MT	Herbers (yellow card) 29'; Berić 45'; Pineda (yellow card) 67'; Gimenez (yellow card) 74'; Gutiérrez (yellow card) 86'	Report		Stadium: Soldier Field; Attendance: 31,308; Referee: Rosendo Mendoza

October 27, 2021 31	FC Dallas	1–2	Real Salt Lake	Frisco, Texas
6:00 PM MT	Hedges 20'; Jara (yellow card) 57'	Report	Kreilach 80'; Rusnák 90'	Stadium: Toyota Stadium; Attendance: 12,486; Referee: Ismail Elfath

October 30, 2021 32	Real Salt Lake	3–4	San Jose Earthquakes	Sandy, Utah
8:30 PM MT	Rusnák 9', 90+2'; Glad (yellow card) 48'; Chang 85'	Report	Alanís (yellow card) 27'; Fierro 37'; Yueill (yellow card) 45', (goal) 79'; Wondolowski 45+3'; Judson (yellow card) 58'; Cowell 69'; Espinoza (yellow card) 75'	Stadium: Rio Tinto Stadium; Attendance: 15,553; Referee: Jon Freemon

==== November ====
November 3, 2021 33	Real Salt Lake	1–3	Portland Timbers	Sandy, Utah
8:30 PM MT	Ruíz (yellow card) 36'; Rusnák 88' (pen.)	Report	Blanco 17', 45'; Herrera 38' (o.g.); Tuiloma (yellow card) 82'; Bravo (yellow card) 87'	Stadium: Rio Tinto Stadium; Attendance: 18,405; Referee: Chris Penso

November 7, 2021 34	Sporting Kansas City	0–1	Real Salt Lake	Kansas City, Kansas
4:00 PM MT	Espinoza (yellow card) 78'	Report	Luiz (yellow card) 86'; Herrera (yellow card) 90+3'; Kreilach 90+5'	Stadium: Children's Mercy Park; Attendance: 19,022; Referee: Ted Unkel

==== Playoffs ====
November 23, 2021 First round	Seattle Sounders FC (2)	0–0 (a.e.t.) (5–6 p)	(7) Real Salt Lake	Seattle, Washington
8:30 PM MST		Report		Stadium: Lumen Field; Attendance: 34,012; Referee: Joseph Dickerson
	Penalties
	Ruidíaz (penalty scored); Paulo (penalty scored); Cissoko (penalty scored); A. Roldan (penalty scored); Lodeiro (penalty scored); Rowe (penalty missed)		(penalty scored) Herrera; (penalty scored) Ruíz; (penalty scored) Kreilach; (penalty scored) Wood; (penalty scored) Silva; (penalty scored) Glad
Note: Real Salt Lake advanced on penalties 6–5

November 28, 2021 Conference Semi-Finals	Sporting Kansas City (3)	1–2	(7) Real Salt Lake	Kansas City, Kansas
1:00 PM MT	Russell 24' (pen.)	Report	Luiz (yellow card) 49'; Julio 72'; Wood 90+1'	Stadium: Children's Mercy Park; Attendance: 21,650; Referee: Kevin Stott

December 4, 2021 Western Conference Final	Portland Timbers (4)	2–0	(7) Real Salt Lake	Portland, Oregon
4:00 PM MT	Mora 5'; Moreno 61', (yellow card) 61'	Report	Herrera (yellow card) 58' (yellow-red card) 79'; Ruíz (yellow card) 90+3'	Stadium: Providence Park; Attendance: 25,218; Referee: Alan Kelly

==== Standings ====
===== Western Conference Table =====
Pos	Team	Pld	W	L	T	GF	GA	GD	Pts	Qualification
1	Colorado Rapids	34	17	7	10	51	35	+16	61	Qualification for the Playoffs Conference semifinals and CONCACAF Champions League
2	Seattle Sounders FC	34	17	8	9	53	33	+20	60	Qualification for the Playoffs first round and CONCACAF Champions League
3	Sporting Kansas City	34	17	10	7	58	40	+18	58	Qualification for the Playoffs first round
4	Portland Timbers	34	17	13	4	56	52	+4	55	Qualification for the Playoffs first round
5	Minnesota United FC	34	13	11	10	42	44	−2	49	Qualification for the Playoffs first round
6	Vancouver Whitecaps FC (Note: Canadian clubs cannot qualify for the 2022 CONCACAF Champions League through the MLS regular season or playoffs.)	34	12	9	13	45	45	0	49	Qualification for the Playoffs first round
7	Real Salt Lake	34	14	14	6	55	54	+1	48	Qualification for the Playoffs first round
8	LA Galaxy	34	13	12	9	50	54	−4	48	
9	Los Angeles FC	34	12	13	9	53	51	+2	45	
10	San Jose Earthquakes	34	10	13	11	46	54	−8	41	
11	FC Dallas	34	7	15	12	47	56	−9	33	
12	Austin FC	34	9	21	4	35	56	−21	31	
13	Houston Dynamo FC	34	6	16	12	36	54	−18	30	

Source: MLS
Rules for classification: 1) points; 2) total wins; 3) total goal differential; 4) total goals scored; 5) fewer disciplinary points; 6) away goal differential; 7) away goals scored; 8) home goals differential; 9) home goals scored; 10) coin toss (2 clubs tied) or drawing of lots (≥3 clubs tied)

===== Overall table =====
Pos	Team	Pld	W	L	T	GF	GA	GD	Pts
11	Minnesota United FC	34	13	11	10	42	44	−2	49
12	Vancouver Whitecaps FC	34	12	9	13	45	45	0	49
13	Real Salt Lake	34	14	14	6	55	54	+1	48
14	New York Red Bulls	34	13	12	9	39	33	+6	48
15	LA Galaxy	34	13	12	9	50	54	−4	48

Source: MLS
Rules for classification: 1) points; 2) total wins; 3) total goal differential; 4) total goals scored; 5) fewer disciplinary points; 6) away goal differential; 7) away goals scored; 8) home goals differential; 9) home goals scored; 10) coin toss (2 clubs tied) or drawing of lots (≥3 clubs tied)

==== Results summary ====
Overall								Home						Away					
Pld	Pts	W	L	T	GF	GA	GD	W	L	T	GF	GA	GD	W	L	T	GF	GA	GD
34	48	14	14	6	55	54	+1	9	4	4	30	21	+9	5	10	2	25	33	−8

Last updated: November 8, 2021
Source: MLS Results
Pld = Matches played; Pts = Points; W = Matches won; T = Matches tied; L = Matches lost; GF = Goals for; GA = Goals against; GD = Goal difference

== Stats ==
=== Squad appearances and goals ===
Last updated December 10, 2021.

No.	Pos	Nat	Player	Total		Major League Soccer		US Open Cup		Playoffs	
No.	Pos	Nat	Player	Apps	Goals	Apps	Goals	Apps	Goals	Apps	Goals
Goalkeepers
1	GK	(United States) USA	David Ochoa	28	0	25	0	0	0	3	0
18	GK	(United States) USA	Zac MacMath	7	0	7	0	0	0	0	0
24	GK	(United States) USA	Jeff Dewsnup	0	0	0	0	0	0	0	0
51	GK	(United States) USA	Andrew Putna	3	0	2+1	0	0	0	0	0
Defenders
2	DF	(United States) USA	Andrew Brody	19	0	12+4	0	0	0	3	0
3	DF	(Canada) CAN	Ashtone Morgan	9	0	4+4	0	0	0	0+1	0
4	DF	(United States) USA	Donny Toia	19	0	15+4	0	0	0	0	0
15	DF	(United States) USA	Justen Glad	34	2	31	2	0	0	3	0
20	DF	(United States) USA	Erik Holt	18	1	14+4	1	0	0	0	0
22	DF	(United States) USA	Aaron Herrera	32	1	29	1	0	0	3	0
26	DF	(Trinidad and Tobago) TRI	Noah Powder	7	0	2+5	0	0	0	0	0
27	DF	(United States) USA	Bret Halsey	0	0	0	0	0	0	0	0
30	DF	(Uruguay) URU	Marcelo Silva	23	0	20	0	0	0	3	0
32	DF	(United States) USA	Zack Farnsworth	0	0	0	0	0	0	0	0
44	DF	(Croatia) CRO	Toni Datković	8	0	7+1	0	0	0	0	0
Midfielders
6	MF	(Argentina) ARG	Pablo Ruíz	32	0	24+5	0	0	0	3	0
8	MF	(Croatia) CRO	Damir Kreilach	36	16	32+1	16	0	0	3	0
9	MF	(Iraq) IRQ	Justin Meram	34	2	15+16	2	0	0	0+3	0
11	MF	(Slovakia) SVK	Albert Rusnák	35	11	34	11	0	0	1	0
13	MF	(United States) USA	Nick Besler	28	0	18+9	0	0	0	1	0
16	MF	(Cuba) CUB	Maikel Chang	30	2	12+16	2	0	0	2	0
25	MF	(Brazil) BRA	Everton Luiz	27	0	19+6	0	0	0	2	0
29	MF	(Ecuador) ECU	Anderson Julio	33	9	10+20	8	0	0	1+2	1
43	MF	(United States) USA	Justin Portillo	2	0	0+2	0	0	0	0	0
Forwards
7	FW	(United States) USA	Bobby Wood	20	3	7+10	2	0	0	0+3	1
10	FW	(Argentina) ARG	Jonathan Menéndez	20	1	10+7	1	0	0	2+1	0
12	FW	(Honduras) HON	Douglas Martínez	6	0	0+6	0	0	0	0	0
14	FW	(United States) USA	Rubio Rubin	37	8	25+9	8	0	0	3	0
17	FW	(United States) USA	Chris Garcia	0	0	0	0	0	0	0	0
19	FW	(United States) USA	Bode Davis	0	0	0	0	0	0	0	0
21	FW	(United States) USA	Tate Schmitt	0	0	0	0	0	0	0	0
23	FW	(United States) USA	Milan Iloski	1	0	0+1	0	0	0	0	0
28	FW	(Venezuela) VEN	Jeizon Ramírez	0	0	0	0	0	0	0	0

=== Assists and Shutouts ===
- Stats from MLS Regular season, MLS playoffs, CONCACAF Champions league, and U.S. Open Cup are all included.
- First tie-breaker for assists and shutouts is minutes played.

As of November 8, 2021

Assists
Rank	Player	Nation	Assists	Matches Played	Minutes played
1	Aaron Herrera	(United States)	11	29	2514
2	Albert Rusnák	(Slovakia)	11	34	3045
3	Damir Kreilach	(Croatia)	9	33	2875
4	Jonathan Menéndez	(Argentina)	5	17	890
5	Justin Meram	(Iraq)	5	31	1398
6	Rubio Rubin	(United States)	5	34	2238
7	Pablo Ruíz	(Argentina)	4	29	2066
8	Andrew Brody	(United States)	2	16	1078
9	Maikel Chang	(Cuba)	2	28	1085
10	Donny Toia	(United States)	2	19	1323
11	Bobby Wood	(United States)	1	17	618
12	Anderson Julio	(Ecuador)	1	30	1016
13	Nick Besler	(United States)	1	27	1643
14	Everton Luiz	(Brazil)	1	25	1662

Shutouts
Rank	Player	Nation	Shutouts	Matches Played	Minutes played
1	David Ochoa	(United States)	5	25	2250
2	Zac MacMath	(United States)	2	7	585
3	Andrew Putna	(United States)	0	3	225

== Club ==
=== Roster ===
- Age calculated as of December 4, 2021 (The club's final matchday of the season)

As of June 18, 2021,

No.	Name	Nationality	Positions	Date of birth (age)	Signed from	Seasons with club (year signed)
1	David Ochoa (HGP)	United States	GK	January 16, 2001 (aged 20)	(United States) Real Salt Lake Academy (HGP)	3 (2019)
2	Andrew Brody	United States	DF	May 3, 1995 (aged 26)	(United States) Real Monarchs	1 (2021)
3	Ashtone Morgan	Canada	DF	February 9, 1991 (aged 30)	(Canada) Toronto FC	2 (2020)
4	Donny Toia	United States	DF	May 28, 1992 (aged 29)	(United States) Orlando City SC	4 (2011, 2019)
6	Pablo Ruíz	Argentina	MF	December 20, 1998 (aged 22)	(Chile) San Luis	4 (2018)
7	Bobby Wood	United States	FW	November 15, 1992 (aged 29)	(Germany) Hamburger SV	1 (2021)
8	Damir Kreilach	Croatia	MF	April 16, 1989 (aged 32)	(Germany) Union Berlin	4 (2018)
9	Justin Meram	Iraq	MF	December 4, 1988 (aged 33)	(United States) Atlanta United FC	2 (2020)
10	Jonathan Menéndez	Argentina	FW	March 5, 1994 (aged 27)	(Argentina) Independiente	1 (2021)
11	Albert Rusnák (DP)	Slovakia	MF	July 7, 1994 (aged 27)	(Netherlands) FC Groningen	5 (2017)
12	Douglas Martínez	Honduras	FW	June 5, 1997 (aged 24)	(United States) Real Monarchs	3 (2019)
13	Nick Besler	United States	MF	May 7, 1993 (aged 28)	(United States) Real Monarchs	5 (2017)
14	Rubio Rubin	United States	FW	March 1, 1996 (aged 25)	(United States) San Diego Loyal SC	1 (2021)
15	Justen Glad (HGP)	United States	DF	February 28, 1997 (aged 24)	(United States) Real Salt Lake Academy (HGP)	8 (2014)
16	Maikel Chang	Cuba	MF	April 18, 1991 (aged 30)	(United States) Real Monarchs	2 (2020)
17	Chris Garcia (HGP)	United States	FW	January 13, 2003 (aged 18)	(United States) Real Salt Lake Academy (HGP)	2 (2020)
18	Zac MacMath	United States	GK	August 7, 1991 (aged 30)	(Canada) Vancouver Whitecaps FC	2 (2020)
19	Bode Davis	United States	FW	February 22, 2002 (aged 19)	(United States) Real Monarchs	1 (2021)
20	Erik Holt (HGP)	United States	DF	September 6, 1996 (aged 25)	(United States) Real Salt Lake Academy (HGP)	3 (2019)
21	Tate Schmitt (HGP)	United States	FW	May 28, 1997 (aged 24)	(United States) Real Salt Lake Academy (HGP)	3 (2019)
22	Aaron Herrera (HGP)	United States	DF	June 6, 1997 (aged 24)	(United States) Real Salt Lake Academy (HGP)	4 (2018)
23	Milan Iloski (HGP)	United States	FW	July 29, 1999 (aged 22)	(United States) Real Salt Lake Academy (HGP)	2 (2020)
24	Jeff Dewsnup (HGP)	United States	GK	May 21, 2004 (aged 17)	(United States) Real Salt Lake Academy (HGP)	1 (2021)
25	Everton Luiz	Brazil	MF	May 24, 1988 (aged 33)	(Italy) S.P.A.L.	3 (2019)
26	Noah Powder	Trinidad and Tobago	DF	October 27, 1998 (aged 23)	(United States) Real Monarchs	1 (2021)
27	Bret Halsey (GA)	United States	DF	June 1, 2000 (aged 21)	(United States) Virginia Cavaliers	1 (2021)
28	Jeizon Ramírez (DP)	Venezuela	FW	March 24, 2001 (aged 20)	(Venezuela) Deportivo Táchira F.C.	2 (2020)
29	Anderson Julio	Ecuador	MF	May 31, 1996 (aged 25)	(Mexico) Atlético San Luis (on loan)	1 (2021)
30	Marcelo Silva	Uruguay	DF	March 21, 1989 (aged 32)	(Spain) Real Zaragoza	5 (2017)
32	Zack Farnsworth (HGP)	United States	DF	July 13, 2002 (aged 19)	(United States) Real Salt Lake Academy (HGP)	1 (2021)
43	Justin Portillo	United States	MF	September 9, 1992 (aged 29)	(United States) Real Monarchs	3 (2019)
44	Toni Datković	Croatia	DF	November 6, 1993 (aged 28)	(Greece) Aris Thessaloniki	1 (2021)
51	Andrew Putna	United States	GK	October 21, 1994 (aged 27)	(United States) Real Monarchs	4 (2018)

=== Transfers ===
As of September 22, 2021

==== In ====
Player	Position	Previous Club	Fees/Notes	Date	Notes	Ref.
(United States) Bode Davis	FW	(United States) Real Monarchs	Free transfer	September 22, 2020		
(Trinidad and Tobago) Noah Powder	DF	(United States) Real Monarchs	Free transfer	September 24, 2020		
(United States) Andrew Brody	DF	(United States) Real Monarchs	Free transfer	September 25, 2020		
(United States) Rubio Rubin	FW	(United States) San Diego Loyal SC	Undisclosed	January 7, 2021		
(United States) Jeff Dewsnup	GK	(United States) RSL Academy	Homegrown player	January 7, 2021		
(United States) Bobby Wood	FW	(Germany) Hamburger SV	Undisclosed	April 2, 2021	Joined Club on June 3, 2021	
(Argentina) Jonathan Menéndez	FW	(Argentina) Independiente	Undisclosed	May 29, 2021		
(Croatia) Toni Datković	DF	(Greece) Aris Thessaloniki	Undisclosed	June 2, 2021		
(United States) Zack Farnsworth	DF	(United States) RSL Academy	Homegrown Player	June 16, 2021		

==== MLS Drafts ====
Player	Position	Acquired From	Fees/Notes	Date	Ref.
(United States) Bret Halsey	DF	(United States) Virginia Cavaliers	SuperDraft, 1st Round, Pick 7	January 21, 2021	
(United States) Elijah Amo	MF	(United States) Louisville Cardinals	SuperDraft, 2nd Round, Pick 34	January 21, 2021	
(United States) Aris Briggs	FW	(United States) Georgia State Panthers	SuperDraft, 3nd Round, Pick 61	January 21, 2021	
(United States) Rene White	FW	(United States) NJIT Highlanders	SuperDraft, Compensatory Pick, Pick 84	January 21, 2021	

==== Out ====
Player	Position	Next Club	Fees/Notes	Date
(Liberia) Sam Johnson	FW	(Malaysia) Sabah	Mutual Agreement	October 31, 2020
(England) Nedum Onuoha	DF	Retired		November 8, 2020
(England) Luke Mulholland	MF	Retired		November 8, 2020
(Trinidad and Tobago) Alvin Jones	DF		Option Declined	November 30, 2020
(United States) Luis Arriaga	MF	(United States) North Carolina FC	Option Declined	November 30, 2020
(Italy) Giuseppe Rossi	FW	(Italy) SPAL	Option Declined	November 30, 2020
(United States) Julián Vázquez	FW	(United States) Las Vegas Lights	Option Declined	November 30, 2020
(United States) Kyle Beckerman	MF	Retired		December 21, 2020
(United States) Corey Baird	FW	(United States) Los Angeles FC	$500,000 + int'l roster spot	January 11, 2021

Notes

1. Option Declined (OPT): Players who have had their option declined may still be resigned by the club under a new contract.
2. Free Agent (FREE): Players who are out of contract may still be resigned by the club under a new contract.

=== Loans ===
==== In ====
Player	Position	Loaned From	Fees/Notes	Date
(Ecuador) Anderson Julio	FW	(Mexico) Atlético San Luis	Loan for entire 2021 season	March 12, 2021

==== Out ====
Player	Position	Loaned To	Fees/Notes	Date
(United States) Tate Schmitt	FW	(United States) Phoenix Rising	Loan for the remainder of the 2021 season	June 10, 2021
(United States) Chris Garcia	FW	(Sweden) Ljungskile SK	Loan for the entire 2021 Superettan season (Nov 2021)	August 10, 2021
(Honduras) Douglas Martínez	FW	(United States) San Diego Loyal	Loan for the remainder of the 2021 season	August 23, 2021

=== Trialist ===
Player	Position	Previous team	Notes	Date	Result
