= 2019 Real Salt Lake season =

American soccer team season

Real Salt Lake
2019 season
- Owner: Dell Loy Hansen
- Head coach: Mike Petke (until August 11); Freddy Juarez (as interim; from August 11)
- Stadium: Rio Tinto Stadium
- Major League Soccer: Conference: 3rd Overall: 6th
- MLS Cup Playoffs: Conference Semifinals
- U.S. Open Cup: 4th Round
- Leagues Cup: Quarterfinals
- Rocky Mountain Cup: Champions
- Highest home attendance: League/All: 20,838 (September 25 vs. LA Galaxy)
- Lowest home attendance: League: 15,949 (May 18 vs. Toronto FC); All: 15,039 (June 11 vs. LAFC, USOC )
- Average home league attendance: 17,970
- Biggest win: RSL 3-0 SEA (8/14)
- Biggest defeat: DC 5-0 RSL (3/16)
Home colors	Away colors

The 2019 Real Salt Lake season was the team's 15th year of existence, and their 15th consecutive season in Major League Soccer, the top division of the American soccer pyramid.

== Non-competitive ==
=== Preseason ===
==== 2019 Pacific Rim Cup ====
February 8, 2019 Friendly	Real Salt Lake	2–1	Iwaki	Honolulu, Hawaii
8:30 p.m. MT	Saucedo 24'; Besler 87'	Report	Hiraoka 74'	Stadium: Aloha Stadium

February 10, 2019 Friendly	Real Salt Lake	1–3	V-Varen Nagasaki	Honolulu, Hawaii
	Vazquez 84'	RSL Report; MLS Report	Sawada 20'; Onaga 45'; Nagura 85'	Stadium: Aloha Stadium

==== Mobile Mini Sun Cup ====
February 16 Friendly	Phoenix Rising FC	1–4	Real Salt Lake	Scottsdale, Arizona
7:00pm	Jahn 2'	RSL Report; Phoenix Rising Report	Kreilach 11', 42'; Lennon 62' (pen.); Savarino 74'	Stadium: Phoenix Rising FC Soccer Complex

February 20 Friendly	Real Salt Lake	1–2	FC Dallas	Tucson, Arizona
12:00pm	Saucedo 22'		Ferreira 74'; Mosquera 62' (pen.)	Stadium: Kino North Stadium

February 23 Friendly	Portland Timbers	3–0	Real Salt Lake	Tucson, Arizona
6:00pm	Ebobisse 5'; Blanco 44'; Polo 73'	Report		Stadium: Kino North Stadium

== Competitions ==
=== MLS regular season ===
2019 Major League Soccer season

==== Standings ====
===== Western Conference table =====
2019 MLS Western Conference standings
Pos	Team	Pld	W	L	T	GF	GA	GD	Pts	Qualification
1	Los Angeles FC	34	21	4	9	85	37	+48	72	Qualification for the conference semifinals
2	Seattle Sounders FC	34	16	10	8	51	49	+2	56	Qualification for the first round
3	Real Salt Lake	34	16	13	5	45	41	+4	53	Qualification for the first round
4	Minnesota United FC	34	15	11	8	52	42	+10	53	Qualification for the first round
5	LA Galaxy	34	16	15	3	56	55	+1	51	Qualification for the first round

Source: MLS
Rules for classification: 1) points; 2) total wins; 3) total goal differential; 4) total goals scored; 5) disciplinary points; 6) away goal differential; 7) away goals scored; 8) home goals scored; 9) home goal differential; 10) coin toss or drawing of lots

===== Overall table =====
2019 MLS regular season standings
Pos	Team	Pld	W	L	T	GF	GA	GD	Pts	
4	Seattle Sounders FC (C)	34	16	10	8	52	49	+3	56	Qualification for the CONCACAF Champions League
5	Philadelphia Union	34	16	11	7	58	50	+8	55	
6	Real Salt Lake	34	16	13	5	46	41	+5	53	
7	Minnesota United FC	34	15	11	8	52	43	+9	53	
8	LA Galaxy	34	16	15	3	58	59	−1	51	

Source: MLS
Rules for classification: 1) points; 2) total wins; 3) total goal differential; 4) total goals scored; 5) disciplinary points; 6) away goals scored; 7) away goal differential; 8) coin toss or drawing of lots
(C) MLS Cup champions

==== Results summary ====
Overall								Home						Away					
Pld	Pts	W	L	T	GF	GA	GD	W	L	T	GF	GA	GD	W	L	T	GF	GA	GD
34	53	16	13	5	46	41	+5	12	4	1	31	15	+16	4	9	4	15	26	−11

Last updated: October 7, 2019
Source: MLS Results
Pld = Matches played; Pts = Points; W = Matches won; T = Matches tied; L = Matches lost; GF = Goals for; GA = Goals against; GD = Goal difference

==== Match results ====
March 2, 2019 1	Houston Dynamo	1–1	Real Salt Lake	Houston, Texas
4:00 pm MDT	Garcia (yellow card) 30'; Vera (yellow card) 31' (yellow-red card) 82'; Manotas 62'	Report	Luiz (yellow card) 11'; Beckerman (yellow card) 14'; Herrera (yellow card) 27'; Rusnák 40'; Johnson (yellow card) 90+3'	Stadium: BBVA Compass Stadium; Attendance: 16,827; Referee: Armando Villarreal

March 9, 2019 2	Real Salt Lake	1–0	Vancouver Whitecaps FC	Sandy, Utah
4:00 pm MDT	Rusnák 21' (pen.); Luiz (yellow card) 41'	Report	Reyna (yellow card) 17'	Stadium: Rio Tinto Stadium; Attendance: 17,096; Referee: Drew Fischer

March 16, 2019 3	D.C. United	5–0	Real Salt Lake	Washington, D.C.
6:00 pm MST	Rooney 34' (pen.), 41', 65'; Canouse (yellow card) 37'; Moreno (yellow card) 57'; Rodríguez (yellow card) 71', (goal) 76'; Segura 80'	Report	Silva (yellow card) 32' (yellow-red card) 67'; Savarino (red card) 45+3'; Saucedo (yellow card) 70'; Baird (yellow card) 78'	Stadium: Audi Field; Attendance: 17,190; Referee: Dave Gantar

March 23, 2019 4	Los Angeles FC	2–1	Real Salt Lake	Los Angeles, California
8:30 pm MST	Harvey (yellow card) 18'; Horta (yellow card) 22'; Rossi 40'; Zimmerman 90+2'	Report	Luiz (yellow card) 4'; Saucedo (yellow card) 24'; Kreilach 35' (pen.), (yellow card) 79'; Beckerman (yellow card) 55'; Portillo (red card) 84'; Herrera (yellow card) 90+3'	Stadium: Banc of California Stadium; Attendance: 22,023; Referee: Ismail Elfath

March 30, 2019 5	Real Salt Lake	2–4	FC Dallas	Sandy, Utah
7:00 pm MST	Kreilach (red card) 17'; Savarino 31'; Beckerman (yellow card) 44'; Saucedo (yellow card) 48'; Silva 66'	Report	Gruezo 1'; Pomykal 32', 64'; Cannon (yellow card) 45+1'; González (yellow card) 53'; Ferreira 69'	Stadium: Rio Tinto Stadium; Attendance: 18,220; Referee: Baldomero Toledo

April 6, 2019 6	Seattle Sounders FC	1–0	Real Salt Lake	Seattle, Washington
8:00 pm MST	Lodeiro 18'; Roldan (yellow card) 73'; Leerdam (yellow card) 78'	Recap	Silva (yellow card) 83'	Stadium: CenturyLink Field; Attendance: 37,722; Referee: Nima Saghafi

April 13, 2019 7	Real Salt Lake	2–1	Orlando City SC	Sandy, Utah
7:00 pm MST	Johnson 17'; Onuoha (yellow card) 34'; Kreilach (yellow card) 41', (goal) 55'; Beckerman (yellow card) 74'	Report	O'Neill (yellow card) 45+1'; Dwyer (yellow card) 69'; Nani 81'; Johnson (yellow card) 90+1'	Stadium: Rio Tinto Stadium; Attendance: 16,770; Referee: Chris Penso

April 19, 2019 8	FC Cincinnati	0–3	Real Salt Lake	Cincinnati, Ohio
5:30 pm MST	Waston (yellow card) 58'	Report	Rusnák (yellow card) 38', (goal) 42', 59' (pen.); Johnson 45+2'; Baird (yellow card) 45+3'	Stadium: Nippert Stadium; Attendance: 26,416; Referee: Fotis Bazakos

April 28, 2019 9	LA Galaxy	2–1	Real Salt Lake	Carson, California
6:00 pm MST	Antuna 16'; Ibrahimovic (yellow card) 60', (goal) 78'; Polenta (yellow card) 82'	Report	Kreilach (yellow card) 32'; Toia 64'	Stadium: Dignity Health Sports Park; Attendance: 20,615; Referee: Joseph Dickerson

May 4, 2019 10	Real Salt Lake	1–2	Portland Timbers	Sandy, Utah
7:00 pm MST	Toia (yellow card) 48'; Johnson 62'; Besler (yellow card) 77'; Herrera (yellow card) 78'	Report	Blanco 34'; Moreira (yellow card) 45+3'; Valeri 68'	Stadium: Rio Tinto Stadium; Attendance: 18,066; Referee: Ramy Touchan

May 11, 2019 11 (RMC)	Colorado Rapids	2–3	Real Salt Lake	Commerce City, Colorado
7:00 pm MST	Wilson (yellow card) 32'; Acosta 45+3'; Wilson 47'; Kamara (penalty missed) 59'; Anderson (yellow card) 64'	Report	Rusnák 25' (pen.); Baird 27'; Glad (yellow card) 35'; Johnson 53'; Kreilach (yellow card) 76'	Stadium: Dick's Sporting Goods Park; Attendance: 15,437; Referee: Robert Sibiga

May 18, 2019 12	Real Salt Lake	3–0	Toronto FC	Sandy, Utah
1:00 pm MST	Kreilach 14'; Besler (yellow card) 25'; Saucedo 28'; Savarino 60'; Toia (yellow card) 82'	Report	Morgan (yellow card) 44'; Pozuelo (yellow card) 53' (yellow-red card) 61'; Altidore (yellow card) 66'	Stadium: Rio Tinto Stadium; Attendance: 15,949; Referee: Joseph Dickerson

May 24, 2019 13	Real Salt Lake	2–1	Atlanta United FC	Sandy, Utah
7:00 pm MST	Saucedo 36'; Herrera (yellow card) 66'; Savarino 90+4'	Report	Parkhurst (yellow card) 38'; J. Martínez 78'	Stadium: Rio Tinto Stadium; Attendance: 17,214; Referee: Jair Marrufo

May 29, 2019 14	Montreal Impact	2–1	Real Salt Lake	Montreal, Quebec
5:30 pm MST	Piette (yellow card) 36'; Browne 45+2'; Taider 68' (pen.); Sagna (yellow card) 83'	Report	Kreilach (yellow card) 59'; Portillo (yellow card) 60'; Johnson 84'	Stadium: Saputo Stadium; Attendance: 11,966; Referee: Fotis Bazakos

June 1, 2019 15	New York Red Bulls	4–0	Real Salt Lake	Harrison, New Jersey
5:00 pm MST	M. Silva 58' (o.g.); Royer 59'; Murillo 64'; Fernandez 83'	Report	Onuoha (yellow card) 15'	Stadium: Red Bull Arena; Attendance: 19,122; Referee: Elton Garcia, Armando Villareal

June 22, 2019 16	Chicago Fire	1–1	Real Salt Lake	Bridgeview, Illinois
6:00 pm MST	Katai 5'; Adams (yellow card) 15'; Schweinsteiger (yellow card) 90+3'	Report	Rusnák 33' (pen.); Luiz (yellow card) 34'; Nick Rimando (yellow card) 90+3'	Stadium: Toyota Park; Attendance: 15,609; Referee: Baldomero Toledo

June 29, 2019 17	Real Salt Lake	2–0	Sporting Kansas City	Sandy, Utah
8:00 pm MST	Johnson 15', 29'; Beckerman (yellow card) 45+2'; Luiz (yellow card) 90+2'	Report	Sánchez (yellow card) 38'; Feilhaber (yellow card) 66'	Stadium: Rio Tinto Stadium; Attendance: 18,933; Referee: Nima Saghafi

July 3, 2019 18	Real Salt Lake	1–0	Columbus Crew	Sandy, Utah
8:00 pm MST	Herrera (yellow card) 31'; Johnson 38'; Baird (yellow card) 55'; Besler (yellow card) 62'; Saucedo (yellow card) 80'	Report	Sosa (yellow card) 32'; Crognale (yellow card) 85'	Stadium: Rio Tinto Stadium; Attendance: 19,030; Referee: Victor Rivas

July 6, 2019 19	San Jose Earthquakes	1–0	Real Salt Lake	San Jose, California
8:30 pm MST	Hoesen 90+3'	Report	Saucedo (yellow card) 86'; Baird (yellow card) 89'	Stadium: Avaya Stadium; Attendance: 15,339; Referee: Rubiel Vazquez

July 13, 2019 20	Real Salt Lake	4–0	Philadelphia Union	Sandy, Utah
8:00 pm MST	Saucedo (yellow card) 17'; Savarino 23', 71'; Kreilach (yellow card) 24', (goal) 89'; Beckerman (yellow card) 28'; Herrera (yellow card) 61'; Rusnák 81'	Report	Aaronson (yellow card) 35'	Stadium: Rio Tinto Stadium; Attendance: 18,925; Referee: Silviu Petrescu

July 20, 2019 21	Real Salt Lake	1–1	Minnesota United FC	Sandy, Utah
5:00 pm MST	Lennon (yellow card) 21'; Silva 70'	Report	Greguš (yellow card) 26'; Quintero 57'	Stadium: Rio Tinto Stadium; Attendance: 16,992; Referee: David Gantar

July 27, 2019 22	FC Dallas	0–0	Real Salt Lake	Frisco, Texas
6:00 pm MST	Cannon (yellow card) 35'; Acosta (yellow card) 67'	Report	Glad (yellow card) 90+2'	Stadium: Toyota Stadium; Attendance: 14,717; Referee: Ramy Touchan

August 3, 2019 23	Real Salt Lake	3–1	New York City	Sandy, Utah
8:00 pm MST	Savarino 37'; Luiz (yellow card) 45+2'; Beckerman (yellow card) 68'; Rusnák 75'; Besler 88'	Report	Ring 4', (yellow card) 74'; Sands (yellow card) 28'; Matarrita (yellow card) 90+2'	Stadium: Rio Tinto Stadium; Attendance: 18,282; Referee: Tim Ford

August 10, 2019 24	Sporting Kansas City	1–2	Real Salt Lake	Kansas City, Kansas
6:30 pm MST	Gutierrez (yellow card) 29'; Russell 31'; Fontas (yellow card) 45+4'; Sallói (yellow card) 84'; Hurtado (red card) 90+2'	Report	Besler (yellow card) 29'; Baird 38', 70', (yellow card) 76'; Toia (yellow card) 45+2'; Herrera (yellow card) 90+5'	Stadium: Children's Mercy Park; Attendance: 18,219; Referee: Fotis Bazakos

August 14, 2019 25	Real Salt Lake	3–0	Seattle Sounders FC	Sandy, Utah
8:00 pm MST	Johnson 25'; Luiz (yellow card) 52'; Rusnák 71'; Baird 87'	Report	Jones (yellow card) 70'	Stadium: Rio Tinto Stadium; Attendance: 17,825; Referee: Armando Villareal

August 17, 2019 26	Real Salt Lake	0–2	Los Angeles FC	Sandy, Utah
8:00 pm MST	Baird (yellow card) 6'; Luiz (yellow card) 56'; Herrera (red card) 62'	Report	Zimmerman (yellow card) 17' (yellow-red card) 48'; Vela 64' (pen.); Diomande 82'	Stadium: Rio Tinto Stadium; Attendance: 18,213; Referee: Baldomero Toledo

August 24, 2019 27 (RMC)	Real Salt Lake	2–0	Colorado Rapids	Sandy, Utah
8:00 pm MST	Lennon (yellow card) 8'; Beckerman (yellow card) 74'; Plata 90+6' (pen.); Savarino 90+9'	Report	Rubio (yellow card) 48'; Rosenberry (yellow card) 73'; Acosta (yellow card) 80'; Abubakar (yellow card) 87'; Kamara (red card) 89'	Stadium: Rio Tinto Stadium; Attendance: 20,384; Referee: Ted Unkel

August 31, 2019 28	Portland Timbers	1–0	Real Salt Lake	Portland, Oregon
8:30 pm MST	Valeri 16'; Dielna (yellow card) 66'; Zambrano (red card) 90+6'	Report		Stadium: Providence Park; Attendance: 25,218; Referee: Nima Saghafi

September 11, 2019 29	Real Salt Lake	1–0	San Jose Earthquakes	Sandy, Utah
7:30 pm MST	Beckerman (yellow card) 31'; Lennon (yellow card) 60'; Kreilach 75'	Report	Judson (yellow card) 28'; Jungwirth (yellow card) 90+2'; Godoy (yellow card) 90+4'	Stadium: Rio Tinto Stadium; Attendance: 17,196; Referee: Joseph Dickerson

September 15, 2019 30	Minnesota United FC	3–1	Real Salt Lake	Saint Paul, Minnesota
3:30 pm MST	Quintero 20', 51'; Finlay 83'	Report	Rusnák 17'	Stadium: Allianz Field; Attendance: 19,364; Referee: Rosendo Mendoza

September 21, 2019 31	New England Revolution	0–0	Real Salt Lake	Foxborough, Massachusetts
5:30 pm MST	Delamea (yellow card) 46'	Report	Putna (yellow card) 87'	Stadium: Gillette Stadium; Attendance: 24,270; Referee: Armando Villarreal

September 25, 2019 32	Real Salt Lake	1–2	LA Galaxy	Sandy, Utah
7:30 pm MST	Rusnák (yellow card) 82'; Onuoha 89'	Report	Polenta (yellow card) 36'; Pavón 50'; Steres (yellow card) 60'; Ibrahimović 80'	Stadium: Rio Tinto Stadium; Attendance: 20,838; Referee: Rubiel Vazquez

September 29, 2019 33	Real Salt Lake	2–1	Houston Dynamo	Sandy, Utah
5:30 pm MST	Baird 1'; Savarino (yellow card) 29', (goal) 75'	Report	Martínez 32'; McNamara (yellow card) 87'	Stadium: Rio Tinto Stadium; Attendance: 18,117; Referee: Alex Chilowicz

October 6, 2019 34	Vancouver Whitecaps FC	0–1	Real Salt Lake	Vancouver, British Columbia
2:00 pm MST	Godoy (yellow card) 90'; Chirinos (yellow card) 90+2'	Report	Kreilach 28'	Stadium: BC Place; Attendance: 18,378; Referee: Ted Unkel

=== MLS Cup playoffs ===
October 19, 2019 FR	Real Salt Lake	2–1	Portland Timbers	Sandy, Utah
8:00 pm MST	Kreilach 28'; Savarino (yellow card) 44', (goal) 87'; Beckerman (yellow card) 57'	Report	Blanco (yellow card) 39'; Asprilla 47'	Stadium: Rio Tinto Stadium; Attendance: 17,452; Referee: Ismail Elfath

October 23, 2019 CS	Seattle Sounders FC	2–0	Real Salt Lake	Seattle, Washington
8:00 pm MST	Svensson 64'; Lodeiro 81', (yellow card) 82'	Boxscore	Onuoha (yellow card) 28'; Luiz (red card) 83'	Stadium: CenturyLink Field; Attendance: 37,722; Referee: Alan Kelly

=== U.S. Open Cup ===
June 11, 2019 4R	Real Salt Lake (Utah)	0–3	(California) Los Angeles FC	Sandy, Utah
8:00 pm MST	Beckerman (yellow card) 19'; Toia (yellow card) 49'; Luiz (yellow card) 55'	Report	Vela 8'; Nguyen 64'; Diomande 90+3'	Stadium: Rio Tinto Stadium; Attendance: 15,039; Referee: Victor Rivas

=== Leagues Cup ===
July 24, 2019 QF	Real Salt Lake (United States)	0–1	(Mexico) UANL	Sandy, Utah
8:00 pm MST	Lennon (red card) 84'	Report	Vargas 57'; Salcedo (yellow card) 37'	Stadium: Rio Tinto Stadium; Attendance: 15,136; Referee: John Pitti

== Stats ==
=== Squad appearances and goals ===
Last updated October 24, 2019.

No.	Pos	Nat	Player	Total		Major League Soccer		Leagues Cup		U.S. Open Cup		Playoffs	
No.	Pos	Nat	Player	Apps	Goals	Apps	Goals	Apps	Goals	Apps	Goals	Apps	Goals
Goalkeepers
1	GK	(United States) USA	Alex Horwath	0	0	0	0	0	0	0	0	0	0
18	GK	(United States) USA	Nick Rimando	33	0	29	0	1	0	1	0	2	0
24	GK	(United States) USA	David Ochoa	0	0	0	0	0	0	0	0	0	0
51	GK	(United States) USA	Andrew Putna	5	0	5	0	0	0	0	0	0	0
Defenders
4	DF	(United States) USA	Donny Toia	27	1	24	1	0	0	1	0	2	0
12	DF	(United States) USA	Brooks Lennon	29	0	16+12	0	1	0	0	0	0	0
14	DF	(England) ENG	Nedum Onuoha	29	1	26+1	1	0	0	0	0	2	0
15	DF	(United States) USA	Justen Glad	25	0	23	0	1	0	0	0	1	0
20	DF	(United States) USA	Erik Holt	7	0	5	0	1	0	1	0	0	0
22	DF	(United States) USA	Aaron Herrera	35	0	31+1	0	1	0	0	0	2	0
30	DF	(Uruguay) URU	Marcelo Silva	21	2	14+5	2	0	0	1	0	1	0
Midfielders
5	MF	(United States) USA	Kyle Beckerman	29	0	24+1	0	0+1	0	1	0	2	0
6	MF	(United States) USA	Kelyn Rowe	5	0	2+2	0	0	0	0	0	0+1	0
8	MF	(Croatia) CRO	Damir Kreilach	36	7	32	6	1	0	1	0	2	1
11	MF	(Slovakia) SVK	Albert Rusnák	31	10	28+1	10	0	0	0	0	2	0
13	MF	(United States) USA	Nick Besler	18	1	7+10	1	1	0	0	0	0	0
19	MF	(England) ENG	Luke Mulholland	2	0	0+1	0	0	0	0+1	0	0	0
23	MF	(United States) USA	Sebastian Saucedo	28	2	13+13	2	0+1	0	0	0	0+1	0
25	MF	(Brazil) BRA	Everton Luiz	31	0	24+3	0	1	0	1	0	2	0
26	MF	(United States) USA	Luis Arriaga	2	0	0+2	0	0	0	0	0	0	0
43	MF	(United States) USA	Justin Portillo	4	0	2+2	0	0	0	0	0	0	0
70	MF	(United States) USA	Jordan Allen	0	0	0	0	0	0	0	0	0	0
Forwards
7	FW	(Venezuela) VEN	Jefferson Savarino	31	9	27+1	8	1	0	0	0	2	1
10	FW	(Ecuador) ECU	Joao Plata	20	1	2+15	1	1	0	0	0	0+2	0
17	FW	(United States) USA	Corey Baird	34	5	23+8	5	1	0	0	0	2	0
21	FW	(United States) USA	Tate Schmitt	8	0	1+5	0	0+1	0	1	0	0	0
27	FW	(United States) USA	Julián Vásquez	1	0	0	0	0	0	0+1	0	0	0
42	FW	(Honduras) HON	Douglas Martínez	1	0	1	0	0	0	0	0	0	0
50	FW	(Liberia) LBR	Sam Johnson	27	9	15+9	9	0	0	1	0	0+2	0
Other players (Departed during season, short-term loan, etc.)
2	DF	(United States) USA	Tony Beltran	0	0	0	0	0	0	0	0	0	0
45	DF	(United States) USA	Andrew Brody	1	0	0	0	0	0	1	0	0	0
-	MF	(Argentina) ARG	Pablo Enrique Ruíz	0	0	0	0	0	0	0	0	0	0
-	DF	(Wales) WAL	Adam Henley	0	0	0	0	0	0	0	0	0	0

0+1 means player came on as a sub once. 1+1 means player started once and came on as a sub once.

=== Goals, assists, and shutouts ===
- Stats from MLS Regular season, MLS playoffs, CONCACAF Champions league, and U.S. Open Cup are all included.
- First tie-breaker for goals is assists; first for assists and shutouts is minutes played.

As of October 21, 2019

Goals
Rank	Player	Nation	Goals	Assists
1	Albert Rusnák	(Slovakia)	10	5
2	Jefferson Savarino	(Venezuela)	9	5
2	Sam Johnson	(Liberia)	9	0
4	Damir Kreilach	(Croatia)	7	5
4	Corey Baird	(United States)	5	5
6	Sebastian Saucedo	(United States)	2	4
6	Marcelo Silva	(Uruguay)	2	0
8	Nick Besler	(United States)	1	2
8	Donny Toia	(United States)	1	1
8	Nedum Onuoha	(England)	1	0
8	Joao Plata	(Ecuador)	1	0

Assists
Rank	Player	Nation	Assists	Minutes played
1	Corey Baird	(United States)	5	2181
1	Kyle Beckerman	(United States)	5	2224
1	Jefferson Savarino	(Venezuela)	5	2410
1	Albert Rusnák	(Slovakia)	5	2545
1	Damir Kreilach	(Croatia)	5	2743
6	Sebastian Saucedo	(United States)	4	1189
6	Aaron Herrera	(United States)	4	2858
8	Nick Besler	(United States)	2	727
8	Everton Luiz	(Brazil)	2	2196
10	Erik Holt	(United States)	1	371
10	Brooks Lennon	(United States)	1	1539
10	Donny Toia	(United States)	1	2233

Shutouts
Rank	Player	Nation	Shutouts	Minutes played
1	Nick Rimando	(United States)	10	2700
2	Andrew Putna	(United States)	2	450

== Club ==
=== Roster ===
- Age calculated as of the start of the 2019 season.

As of October 7, 2019,

No.	Name	Nationality	Positions	Date of birth (age)	Signed from	Year with club (year signed)
1	Alex Horwath	United States	GK	March 27, 1987 (aged 31)	(Norway) SK Brann	2 (2018)
4	Donny Toia	United States	DF	May 28, 1992 (aged 26)	(United States) Orlando City SC	2 (2011, 2019)
5	Kyle Beckerman (Captain)	United States	MF	April 23, 1982 (aged 36)	(United States) Colorado Rapids	13 (2007)
6	Kelyn Rowe	United States	MF	December 2, 1991 (aged 27)	(United States) Sporting Kansas City	1 (2019)
7	Jefferson Savarino (DP)	Venezuela	MF	November 11, 1996 (aged 22)	(Venezuela) Zulia FC	3 (2017)
8	Damir Kreilach	Croatia	MF	April 16, 1989 (aged 29)	(Germany) Union Berlin	2 (2018)
10	Joao Plata	Ecuador	FW	March 1, 1992 (aged 27)	(Canada) Toronto FC	7 (2013)
11	Albert Rusnák (DP)	Slovakia	MF	July 7, 1994 (aged 24)	(Netherlands) FC Groningen	3 (2017)
12	Brooks Lennon (HGP)	United States	FW	September 22, 1997 (aged 21)	(England) Liverpool F.C.	3 (2017)
13	Nick Besler	United States	MF	May 7, 1993 (aged 25)	(United States) Real Monarchs	3 (2017)
14	Nedum Onuoha	England	DF	November 12, 1986 (aged 32)	(England) Queens Park Rangers F.C.	2 (2018)
15	Justen Glad	United States	DF	February 28, 1997 (aged 22)	(United States) Real Salt Lake Academy (HGP)	6 (2014)
17	Corey Baird (HGP)	United States	FW	January 21, 1997 (aged 22)	(United States) Real Salt Lake Academy (HGP)	2 (2018)
18	Nick Rimando	United States	GK	June 17, 1979 (aged 39)	(United States) D.C. United	13 (2007)
19	Luke Mulholland	England	MF	August 7, 1988 (aged 30)	(United States) Tampa Bay Rowdies	6 (2014)
20	Erik Holt (HGP)	United States	DF	September 6, 1996 (aged 22)	(United States) Real Salt Lake Academy (HGP)	1 (2019)
21	Tate Schmitt (HGP)	United States	FW	May 28, 1997 (aged 21)	(United States) Real Salt Lake Academy (HGP)	1 (2019)
22	Aaron Herrera (HGP)	United States	DF	June 6, 1997 (aged 21)	(United States) Real Salt Lake Academy (HGP)	2 (2018)
23	Sebastian Saucedo	Mexico	FW	January 22, 1997 (aged 22)	(United States) Real Salt Lake Academy (HGP)	6 (2014)
24	David Ochoa (HGP)	United States	GK	January 16, 2001 (aged 18)	(United States) Real Salt Lake Academy (HGP)	1 (2019)
25	Everton Luiz	Brazil	MF	May 24, 1988 (aged 30)	(Italy) S.P.A.L.	1 (2019)
26	Luis Arriaga (HGP)	United States	MF	January 6, 2001 (aged 18)	(United States) Real Salt Lake Academy (HGP)	1 (2019)
27	Julian Vazquez (HGP)	United States	FW	March 30, 2001 (aged 17)	(United States) Real Salt Lake Academy (HGP)	1 (2019)
30	Marcelo Silva	Uruguay	DF	March 21, 1989 (aged 29)	(Spain) Real Zaragoza	3 (2017)
42	Douglas Martínez	Honduras	FW	June 5, 1997 (aged 21)	(United States) Real Monarchs	1 (2019)
43	Justin Portillo	United States	MF	September 9, 1992 (aged 26)	(United States) Real Monarchs	1 (2019)
50	Sam Johnson (DP)	Liberia	FW	May 6, 1993 (aged 25)	(Norway) Vålerenga Fotball	1 (2019)
51	Andrew Putna	United States	GK	October 21, 1994 (aged 24)	(United States) Real Monarchs	2 (2018)
70	Jordan Allen	United States	FW	April 25, 1995 (aged 23)	(United States) Real Salt Lake Academy (HGP)	6 (2014)

=== Transfers ===
As of October 7, 2019

==== In ====
Player	Position	Previous club	Fees/Notes	Date
(United States) Julian Vazquez	FW	(United States) Real Salt Lake Academy	Homegrown Player	10/06/18
(United States) Luis Arriaga	MF	(United States) Real Salt Lake Academy	Homegrown Player	11/28/18
(United States) David Ochoa	GK	(United States) Real Salt Lake Academy	Homegrown Player	11/28/18
(United States) Donny Toia	DF	(United States) Orlando City SC	2018 Re-entry Draft	12/14/18
(United States) Tate Schmitt	FW	(United States) Real Salt Lake Academy	Homegrown Player	01/03/19
(United States) Erik Holt	DF	(United States) Real Salt Lake Academy	Homegrown Player	01/03/19
(Liberia) Sam Johnson	FW	(Norway) Vålerenga Fotball	Designated Player	02/04/19
(United States) Justin Portillo	MF	(United States) Real Monarchs		02/26/19
(United States) Kelyn Rowe	MF	(United States) Sporting Kansas City		08/07/19
(Honduras) Douglas Martínez	FW	(United States) Real Monarchs		08/31/19

==== Out ====
Player	Position	Next Club	Fees/Notes	Date
(Puerto Rico) Shawn Barry	DF	(United States) Tampa Bay Rowdies	option declined	11/21/18
(Mexico) José Hernández	MF	(United States) LA Galaxy II	option declined	11/21/18
(United States) David Horst	DF	Retired	option declined, Retired	11/21/18
(United States) Ricky Lopez-Espin	FW	(United States) Los Angeles FC	option declined, selected in 2018 Waiver Draft	11/21/18
(United States) Taylor Peay	DF	(United States) Louisville City FC	option declined	11/21/18
(Jamaica) Demar Phillips	DF	(United States) Austin Bold FC	option declined	11/21/18
(United States) Luis Silva	MF	(Finland) FC Honka	option declined	11/21/18
(United States) Connor Sparrow	GK	(United States) Nashville SC	option declined	11/21/18
(Nigeria) Stephen Sunday	MF	(Cyprus) Pafos	option declined	11/21/18
(Wales) Adam Henley	DF	(England) Bradford City A.F.C.	Mutual agreement	5/27/19
(United States) Tony Beltran	DF	Retired	retired	9/13/19

Notes

1. Option Declined (OPT): Players who have had their option declined may still be resigned by the club under a new contract.
2. Free Agent (FREE): Players who are out of contract may still be resigned by the club under a new contract.

=== Loans ===
==== In ====
Player	Position	Loaned from	Fees/Notes	Date
(Brazil) Everton Luiz	MF	(Italy) S.P.A.L.	Loaned for 2019 season. Option to buy at the end of season.	01/07/19

==== Out ====
Player	Position	Loaned to	Fees/Notes	Date
(United States) Danilo Acosta	MF	(United States) Orlando City SC	season long loan for $75,000 GAM, option to buy	12/28/18
(Argentina) Pablo Enrique Ruíz	MF	(Austria) FC Pinzgau Saalfelden	6 month loan	07/12/19

=== Trialist ===
Player	Position	Previous team	Notes	Date	Result
