= 2020 Real Salt Lake season =

American soccer team season

Real Salt Lake
2020 season
- Owner: Dell Loy Hansen
- Head coach: Freddy Juarez
- Stadium: Rio Tinto Stadium
- Major League Soccer: Conference: 11th Overall: 21st
- MLS Cup Playoffs: Did not qualify
- U.S. Open Cup: Cancelled
- Leagues Cup: Cancelled
- MLS is Back Tournament: Round of 16
- Highest home attendance: 18,093 (March 7 vs. NYRB)
- Lowest home attendance: 2,770 (Nov 8 vs. SKC)
- Average home league attendance: All: 5,335; Pre-Covid: 18,093; Post-Covid: 3,740
- Biggest win: COL 1–4 RSL (Aug. 22); RSL 3–0 LAFC (Sept. 9)
- Biggest defeat: RSL 0–5 COL (Sept. 12)
Home colors	Away colors

The 2020 Real Salt Lake season was the team's 16th year of existence, and their 16th consecutive season in Major League Soccer, the top division of the American soccer pyramid.

Due to the COVID-19 pandemic, the season was suspended on March 12 and resumed four months later with the MLS is Back Tournament, played behind closed doors in the Orlando metropolitan area. Real Salt Lake resumed home matches in September with a limited capacity of 5,000 people and requirements for spectators to wear masks and practice social distancing.

== Non-competitive ==
=== Preseason ===
February 8 Closed friendly	Real Salt Lake	3–0	Las Vegas Lights FC	Herriman, Utah
	Beckerman; Rossi, (pen.)	Report		Attendance: closed door scrimmage

==== 2020 Visit Tucson Sun Cup ====
February 15 Friendly	Real Salt Lake	0–0	Sporting Kansas City	Tucson, Arizona
4:00pm	Silva (yellow card) 72'; Herrera (yellow card) 76'	Report; Report	Sánchez (yellow card) 40'; Duke (yellow card) 86'	Stadium: Kino North Stadium; Referee: Victor Rivas

February 19 Friendly	Houston Dynamo	4–0	Real Salt Lake	Tucson, Arizona
4:00pm	Manotas 53'; McNamara 60'; Hansen 68'; Ramirez 81'	Report		Stadium: Kino North Stadium

February 22 Friendly	Phoenix Rising FC	3–2	Real Salt Lake	Scottsdale, Arizona
7:00pm	Farrell 19'; Asante 40' (Cochran); Bakero 57'	Report	Kreilach 11' (Herrera); Meram 89'	Stadium: Casino Arizona Field

== Competitions ==
=== MLS regular season ===
Note: The 2020 season was postponed on March 12 due to the COVID-19 pandemic. The season restarted on July 8 with the MLS is Back Tournament in Orlando (see below), followed by resumption of regular season games.

==== Standings ====
===== Western Conference table =====
Pos	Team	Pld	W	L	T	GF	GA	GD	Pts	PPG	Qualification
8	San Jose Earthquakes	23	8	9	6	35	51	−16	30	1.30	MLS Cup First Round
9	Vancouver Whitecaps FC	23	9	14	0	27	44	−17	27	1.17	
10	LA Galaxy	22	6	12	4	27	46	−19	22	1.00	
11	Real Salt Lake	22	5	10	7	25	35	−10	22	1.00	
12	Houston Dynamo	23	4	10	9	30	40	−10	21	0.91	

Source: MLS
Rules for classification: 1) points per game; 2) total wins per match played; 3) total goal differential per match played; 4) total goals scored per match played; 5) fewest disciplinary points per match played; 6) away goal differential per away match played; 7) away goals scored per away match played; 8) home goal differential per home match played; 9) home goals scored per home match played; 10) coin toss or drawing of lots.

==== Results summary ====
Overall								Home						Away					
Pld	Pts	W	L	T	GF	GA	GD	W	L	T	GF	GA	GD	W	L	T	GF	GA	GD
2	2	0	0	2	1	1	0	0	0	1	1	1	0	0	0	1	0	0	0

Last updated: March 9, 2020
Source: MLS Results
Pld = Matches played; Pts = Points; W = Matches won; T = Matches tied; L = Matches lost; GF = Goals for; GA = Goals against; GD = Goal difference

==== Match results ====
February 29 1	Orlando City SC	0–0	Real Salt Lake	Orlando, Florida
4:00 p.m. MDT	Glad (yellow card) 41'	Report	Pereyra (yellow card) 75'	Stadium: Exploria Stadium; Attendance: 25,527; Referee: Rubiel Vazquez

March 7 2	Real Salt Lake	1–1	New York Red Bulls	Sandy, Utah
12:00 p.m. MDT	Silva (yellow card) 54'; Martínez (yellow card) 80'; Kreilach 90+'	Report	Cásseres 13'; Seagrist (yellow card) 35'; Duncan (yellow card) 73'	Stadium: Rio Tinto Stadium; Attendance: 18,093; Referee: Rosendo Mendoza

August 22 6 (RMC)	Colorado Rapids	1–4	Real Salt Lake	Commerce City, Colorado
7:00 p.m. MDT	Herrera 38' (o.g.)	Report	Kreilach 57', (yellow card) 78'; Chang 76', (yellow card) 88'; Baird 85'; Meram 89'	Stadium: Dick's Sporting Goods Park; Attendance: 0 Referee: Fotis Bazakos

August 26 -	Real Salt Lake	P–P	Los Angeles FC	Sandy, Utah (Note: Match postponed as part of a league-wide walkout, following the shooting of Jacob Blake.)
7:30 p.m. MDT				Stadium: Rio Tinto Stadium

August 29 7	Portland Timbers	4–4	Real Salt Lake	Portland, Oregon
8:30 p.m. MDT	Chara 6', (yellow card) 30'; Niezgoda 21'; Mabiala (yellow card) 67'; Williamson (yellow card) 69'; Blanco 70'; Mora 85'	Report	Baird 19'; Kreilach 48'; Johnson (yellow card) 81', (goal) 90+4'; Rossi 90'	Stadium: Providence Park; Attendance: 0 Referee: Ismail Elfath

September 2 8	Real Salt Lake	2–2	Seattle Sounders FC	Sandy, Utah
7:30 p.m. MDT	Herrera (yellow card) 28'; Kreilach (yellow card) 45'+2'; Glad 50'; Ruíz 85'; Baird (yellow card) 90'	Report	Arreaga (yellow card) 18'; Lodeiro 29' (pen.); Gómez 69'; João Paulo (yellow card) 80'	Stadium: Rio Tinto Stadium; Attendance: 4,026; Referee: Malik Badawi

September 6 9	Minnesota United FC	4–0	Real Salt Lake	St. Paul, Minnesota
6:00 p.m. MDT	Gasper 53'; Reynoso (yellow card) 56'; Lod 62', 90'; Hayes 75'	Report	Beckerman (yellow card) 73'	Stadium: Allianz Field; Attendance: 0 Referee: Marcos de Oliveira

September 9 10	Real Salt Lake	3–0	Los Angeles FC	Sandy, Utah
7:30 p.m. MDT	Kreilach 9', (yellow card) 48'; Meram 47'; Ruíz (yellow card) 61'; Glad (yellow card) 70'; Rusnák 79' (pen.); Beckerman (yellow card) 85'	Report	Cifuentes (yellow card) 65'; Harvey (yellow card) 78'	Stadium: Rio Tinto Stadium; Attendance: 4,147; Referee: Victor Rivas
Note: Re-schedule of postponed August 26 match.

September 12 11	Real Salt Lake	0–5	Colorado Rapids	Sandy, Utah
7:30 p.m. MDT	Toia (yellow card) 54'; Martínez (red card) 64'	Report	Rubio 3', 10'; Vines 49'; Galván 55'; Price (yellow card) 69'; Bassett 88'	Stadium: Rio Tinto Stadium; Attendance: 4,484; Referee: Ramy Touchan

September 19 12	Real Salt Lake	1–2	Vancouver Whitecaps FC	Sandy, Utah
7:30 p.m. MDT	Beckerman (yellow card) 8' (yellow-red card) 63'; Toia (yellow card) 68'; Meram 81'; Baird (yellow card) 90+2'	Report	Bikel (yellow card) 15'; Adnan (yellow card) 41'; Milinković 53'; Cavallini 84'; Hasal (yellow card) 90+1'	Stadium: Rio Tinto Stadium; Attendance: 3,409; Referee: Kevin Stott

September 23 13	Real Salt Lake	2–0	LA Galaxy	Sandy, Utah
7:30 p.m. MDT	Baird (yellow card) 62'; Rusnák 65' (pen.); Kreilach 72'	Report	DePuy (yellow card) 24'; Bingham (yellow card) 64'	Stadium: Rio Tinto Stadium; Attendance: 3,943; Referee: Silviu Petrescu

September 27 14	Minnesota United FC	0–0	Real Salt Lake	St. Paul, Minnesota
6:00 p.m. MDT	Métanire (yellow card) 37'	Report	Ruíz (yellow card) 32'; Glad (yellow card) 85'	Stadium: Allianz Field; Referee: Drew Fischer

October 4 15	Real Salt Lake	1–3	Los Angeles FC	Sandy, Utah
7:30 p.m. MDT	Ruíz (yellow card) 60'; Atuesta 64' (o.g.); Johnson (yellow card) 71'; Toia (yellow card) 80'	Report	Wright-Phillips 22'; Rossi 27'; Rodríguez 59'	Stadium: Rio Tinto Stadium; Attendance: 3,062; Referee: Nima Saghafi

October 7 16	Seattle Sounders FC	2–1	Real Salt Lake	Seattle, Washington
8:00 p.m. MDT	Delem (yellow card) 26'; Morris 28'; Gómez 61'; O'Neill (yellow card) 70'	Report	Tolo 68' (o.g.); Besler (yellow card) 76'	Stadium: CenturyLink Field; Referee: David Gantar

October 10 17	Vancouver Whitecaps FC	2–1	Real Salt Lake	Portland, Oregon (Note: Vancouver Whitecaps FC will play their home matches at Providence Park, Portland, instead of their regular home stadium BC Place, Vancouver, due to travel restrictions related to the COVID-19 pandemic.)
8:00 p.m. MDT	Montero (yellow card) 14'; Bikel (yellow card) 43'; Cavallini (yellow card) 61', (goal) 75'; Martínez 71' (o.g.); Dájome (yellow card) 79'; Veselinović (yellow card) 90+7'	Report	Silva (yellow card) 23'; Kreilach 37'; Ruíz (yellow card) 40'; Herrera (yellow card) 58'; Martínez (yellow card) 76'	Stadium: Providence Park; Referee: Silviu Petrescu

October 14 18	Real Salt Lake	2–1	Portland Timbers	Sandy, Utah
7:30 p.m. MDT	Martínez 11'; Silva (yellow card) 16'; Kreilach 26'; Herrera (yellow card) 82'; Portillo (yellow card) 90+1'	Report	Tuiloma 77'	Stadium: Rio Tinto Stadium; Referee: Robert Sibiga

October 18 -	Colorado Rapids	P–P	Real Salt Lake	Commerce City, Colorado (Note: Match originally postponed on October 12 due to COVID-19 concerns in Colorado; ultimately never played.)
7:00 p.m. MDT				Stadium: Dick's Sporting Goods Park

October 24 19	Real Salt Lake	0–0	FC Dallas	Sandy, Utah
6:30 p.m. MDT	Ramírez (yellow card) 90+2'	Report	Jara (yellow card) 75'	Stadium: Rio Tinto Stadium; Attendance: 4,078; Referee: Alex Chilowicz

October 28 20	San Jose Earthquakes	2–0	Real Salt Lake	San Jose, California
8:30 p.m. MDT	Wondolowski 16', 74'; Judson (yellow card) 53'; Ríos (yellow card) 64'	Report	Silva (yellow card) 10'; Besler (yellow card) 22'; Toia (yellow card) 39'; Herrera (yellow card) 59'; Kreilach (yellow card) 63'	Stadium: Earthquakes Stadium; Referee: Elton García

November 1 21	LA Galaxy	2–1	Real Salt Lake	Carson, California
8:30 p.m. MDT	González 18', (yellow card) 56'; Pavón 65'; Zubak (yellow card) 68'	Report	Martínez 78'	Stadium: Dignity Health Sports Park; Referee: Jon Freemon

November 8 22	Real Salt Lake	0–2	Sporting Kansas City	Sandy, Utah
4:30 p.m. MST		Report	Martins (yellow card) 39'; Shelton 45'; Hurtado 48'; Russell (yellow card) 87'	Stadium: Rio Tinto Stadium; Attendance: 2,770; Referee: Kevin Stott

=== MLS is Back tournament ===
==== Group stage ====
Group D results
Pos	Team	Pld	W	D	L	GF	GA	GD	Pts	Qualification
1	Sporting Kansas City	3	2	0	1	6	4	+2	6	Advanced to knockout stage
2	Minnesota United FC	3	1	2	0	4	3	+1	5	Advanced to knockout stage
3	Real Salt Lake	3	1	1	1	2	2	0	4	Advanced to knockout stage
4	Colorado Rapids	3	0	1	2	4	7	−3	1	

Source: MLS

Note: Group stage results of the MLS is Back Tournament were treated as regular season matches in the overall standings.

Matches

July 12 3	Real Salt Lake	2–0	Colorado Rapids	Bay Lake, Florida
8:30 PM MDT	Rusnák 27'; Herrera (yellow card) 37'; Luiz (yellow card) 62'; Kreilach 76'; Glad (yellow card) 82'	Report	Kamara (yellow card) 39'; Price (yellow card) 69'; Irwin (yellow card) 70'	Stadium: ESPN Wide World of Sports Complex; Attendance: 0 Referee: Jair Marrufo

July 17 4	Real Salt Lake	0–0	Minnesota United FC	Bay Lake, Florida
8:30 PM MDT	Herrera (yellow card) 43'; Meram (yellow card) 45+2'; Baird (yellow card) 69'	Report	Chacón (yellow card) 53'; Lod (yellow card) 66'	Stadium: ESPN Wide World of Sports Complex; Attendance: 0 Referee: Alex Chilowicz

July 22 5	Real Salt Lake	0–2	Sporting Kansas City	Bay Lake, Florida
7:00 AM MDT	Holt (yellow card) 20'; Johnson (yellow card) 40'; Beckerman (yellow card) 55'; Glad (yellow card) 71'	Report	Russell 1'; Sánchez (yellow card) 36'; Busio (yellow card) 56'; Smith (yellow card) 62'; Gerso 86'	Stadium: ESPN Wide World of Sports Complex; Attendance: 0 Referee: Fotis Bazakos

==== Knockout stage ====
July 27 Round of 16	San Jose Earthquakes	5–2	Real Salt Lake	Bay Lake, Florida
6:30 PM MDT	Espinoza 21', (yellow card) 31'; Eriksson 49' (pen.), 90+6' (pen.); Qazaishvili 61'; Wondolowski 86'	Report	Martínez 22'; Herrera (yellow card) 29'; Baird (yellow card) 37'; Glad (yellow card) 66'; Kreilach 75'; Silva (red card) 84'; Beckerman (red card) 90+7'	Stadium: ESPN Wide World of Sports Complex; Referee: Drew Fischer

=== U.S. Open Cup ===
The 2020 U.S Open Cup was suspended on March 13 due to the COVID-19 pandemic, before being cancelled by the U.S. Soccer Federation on August 17.

=== Leagues Cup ===
The 2020 Leagues Cup was canceled on May 19 due to the COVID-19 pandemic.

== Stats ==
=== Squad appearances and goals ===
Last updated January 11, 2021.

No.	Pos	Nat	Player	Total		Major League Soccer		MLS is Back Tournament		Playoffs	
No.	Pos	Nat	Player	Apps	Goals	Apps	Goals	Apps	Goals	Apps	Goals
Goalkeepers
1	GK	(United States) USA	David Ochoa	1	0	1	0	0	0	0	0
18	GK	(United States) USA	Zac MacMath	7	0	3	0	4	0	0	0
51	GK	(United States) USA	Andrew Putna	15	0	15	0	0	0	0	0
Defenders
2	DF	(Trinidad and Tobago) TRI	Alvin Jones	1	0	0	0	0+1	0	0	0
3	DF	(Canada) CAN	Ashtone Morgan	0	0	0	0	0	0	0	0
4	DF	(United States) USA	Donny Toia	21	0	16+1	0	4	0	0	0
14	DF	(England) ENG	Nedum Onuoha	15	0	15	0	0	0	0	0
15	DF	(United States) USA	Justen Glad	18	1	11+3	1	4	0	0	0
20	DF	(United States) USA	Erik Holt	7	0	3+2	0	1+1	0	0	0
22	DF	(United States) USA	Aaron Herrera	21	0	17	0	4	0	0	0
30	DF	(Uruguay) URU	Marcelo Silva	16	0	13	0	3	0	0	0
Midfielders
5	MF	(United States) USA	Kyle Beckerman	11	0	3+5	0	2+1	0	0	0
6	MF	(Argentina) ARG	Pablo Enrique Ruíz	19	1	14+2	1	2+1	0	0	0
8	MF	(Croatia) CRO	Damir Kreilach	22	9	17+1	7	4	2	0	0
9	MF	(Iraq) IRQ	Justin Meram	22	3	12+6	3	1+3	0	0	0
11	MF	(Slovakia) SVK	Albert Rusnák	17	3	13+1	2	3	1	0	0
13	MF	(United States) USA	Nick Besler	12	0	6+4	0	0+2	0	0	0
16	MF	(Cuba) CUB	Maikel Chang	19	1	12+5	1	0+2	0	0	0
19	MF	(England) ENG	Luke Mulholland	0	0	0	0	0	0	0	0
25	MF	(Brazil) BRA	Everton Luiz	15	0	8+3	0	4	0	0	0
26	MF	(United States) USA	Luis Arriaga	0	0	0	0	0	0	0	0
43	MF	(United States) USA	Justin Portillo	5	0	3+2	0	0	0	0	0
Forwards
7	FW	(Italy) ITA	Giuseppe Rossi	7	1	1+3	1	0+3	0	0	0
10	FW	(United States) USA	Corey Baird	22	2	14+4	2	4	0	0	0
12	FW	(Honduras) HON	Douglas Martínez	19	3	7+8	2	3+1	1	0	0
17	FW	(United States) USA	Chris Garcia	1	0	0+1	0	0	0	0	0
21	FW	(United States) USA	Tate Schmitt	4	0	3+1	0	0	0	0	0
23	FW	(United States) USA	Milan Iloski	1	0	0+1	0	0	0	0	0
27	FW	(United States) USA	Julián Vázquez	0	0	0	0	0	0	0	0
28	FW	(Venezuela) VEN	Jeizon Ramírez	10	0	0+9	0	0+1	0	0	0
50	FW	(Liberia) LBR	Sam Johnson	10	1	2+5	1	1+2	0	0	0

=== Assists and shutouts ===
- Stats from MLS regular season, MLS playoffs, CONCACAF Champions league, and U.S. Open Cup are all included.
- First tie-breaker for assists and shutouts is minutes played.

As of March 9, 2020

Assists
Rank	Player	Nation	Assists	Minutes played
1	Aaron Herrera	(United States)	1	180

Shutouts
Rank	Player	Nation	Shutouts	Minutes played
1	Zac MacMath	(United States)	1	180

== Club ==
=== Roster ===
- Age calculated as of the start of the 2019 season.

As of October 24, 2019,

No.	Name	Nationality	Positions	Date of birth (age)	Signed from	Seasons with club (year signed)
1	David Ochoa (HGP)	United States	GK	January 16, 2001 (aged 19)	(United States) Real Salt Lake Academy (HGP)	2 (2019)
2	Alvin Jones	Trinidad and Tobago	DF	July 9, 1994 (aged 25)	(United States) OKC Energy FC	1 (2020)
3	Ashtone Morgan	Canada	DF	February 9, 1991 (aged 29)	(Canada) Toronto FC	1 (2020)
4	Donny Toia	United States	DF	May 28, 1992 (aged 27)	(United States) Orlando City SC	3 (2011, 2019)
5	Kyle Beckerman (Captain)	United States	MF	April 23, 1982 (aged 37)	(United States) Colorado Rapids	14 (2007)
7	Giuseppe Rossi	Italy	FW	February 1, 1987 (aged 33)	(Italy) Genoa	1 (2020)
8	Damir Kreilach	Croatia	MF	April 16, 1989 (aged 30)	(Germany) Union Berlin	3 (2018)
9	Justin Meram	Iraq	MF	December 4, 1988 (aged 31)	(United States) Atlanta United FC	1 (2020)
10	Corey Baird (HGP)	United States	FW	January 21, 1997 (aged 23)	(United States) Real Salt Lake Academy (HGP)	3 (2018)
11	Albert Rusnák (DP)	Slovakia	MF	July 7, 1994 (aged 25)	(Netherlands) FC Groningen	4 (2017)
12	Douglas Martínez	Honduras	FW	June 5, 1997 (aged 22)	(United States) Real Monarchs	2 (2019)
13	Nick Besler	United States	MF	May 7, 1993 (aged 26)	(United States) Real Monarchs	4 (2017)
14	Nedum Onuoha	England	DF	November 12, 1986 (aged 33)	(England) Queens Park Rangers F.C.	3 (2018)
15	Justen Glad	United States	DF	February 28, 1997 (aged 23)	(United States) Real Salt Lake Academy (HGP)	7 (2014)
16	Maikel Chang	Cuba	MF	April 18, 1991 (aged 28)	(United States) Real Monarchs	1 (2020)
17	Chris Garcia	United States	FW	January 13, 2003 (aged 17)	(United States) Real Salt Lake Academy (HGP)	1 (2020)
18	Zac MacMath	United States	GK	August 7, 1991 (aged 28)	(Canada) Vancouver Whitecaps FC	1 (2020)
19	Luke Mulholland	England	MF	August 7, 1988 (aged 31)	(United States) Tampa Bay Rowdies	7 (2014)
20	Erik Holt (HGP)	United States	DF	September 6, 1996 (aged 23)	(United States) Real Salt Lake Academy (HGP)	2 (2019)
21	Tate Schmitt (HGP)	United States	FW	May 28, 1997 (aged 22)	(United States) Real Salt Lake Academy (HGP)	2 (2019)
22	Aaron Herrera (HGP)	United States	DF	June 6, 1997 (aged 22)	(United States) Real Salt Lake Academy (HGP)	3 (2018)
23	Milan Iloski	United States	FW	July 29, 1999 (aged 20)	(United States) Real Salt Lake Academy (HGP)	1 (2020)
25	Everton Luiz	Brazil	MF	May 24, 1988 (aged 31)	(Italy) S.P.A.L.	2 (2019)
26	Luis Arriaga (HGP)	United States	MF	January 6, 2001 (aged 19)	(United States) Real Salt Lake Academy (HGP)	2 (2019)
27	Julian Vazquez (HGP)	United States	FW	March 30, 2001 (aged 18)	(United States) Real Salt Lake Academy (HGP)	2 (2019)
28	Jeizon Ramírez (DP)	Venezuela	FW	March 24, 2001 (aged 18)	(Venezuela) Deportivo Táchira F.C.	1 (2020)
30	Marcelo Silva	Uruguay	DF	March 21, 1989 (aged 30)	(Spain) Real Zaragoza	4 (2017)
43	Justin Portillo	United States	MF	September 9, 1992 (aged 27)	(United States) Real Monarchs	2 (2019)
50	Sam Johnson (DP)	Liberia	FW	May 6, 1993 (aged 26)	(Norway) Vålerenga Fotball	2 (2019)
51	Andrew Putna	United States	GK	October 21, 1994 (aged 25)	(United States) Real Monarchs	3 (2018)

=== Transfers ===
As of October 7, 2019

==== In ====
Player	Position	Previous Club	Fees/Notes	Date
(Cuba) Maikel Chang	MF	(United States) Real Monarchs	Free transfer	11/21/19
(Trinidad and Tobago) Alvin Jones	DF	(United States) OKC Energy FC	undisclosed	12/9/19
(United States) Zac MacMath	GK	(Canada) Vancouver Whitecaps FC	Trade for $50,000 in TAM	12/17/19
(United States) Milan Iloski	FW	(United States) UCLA Bruins	Homegrown player	1/15/20
(Canada) Ashtone Morgan	DF	(Canada) Toronto FC	Free agent	1/21/20
(Venezuela) Jeizon Ramírez	FW	(Venezuela) Deportivo Táchira F.C.	Young DP	2/6/20
(United States) Chris Garcia	FW	(United States) Real Salt Lake Academy	Homegrown player	2/10/20
(Iraq) Justin Meram	MF	(United States) Atlanta United FC	Free agent	2/11/20
(Italy) Giuseppe Rossi	FW	unattached	Free agent	2/27/20

==== Out ====
Player	Position	Next Club	Fees/Notes	Date
(United States) Nick Rimando	GK	retired		10/24/19
(United States) Danilo Acosta	DF	(United States) LA Galaxy	option declined	11/21/19
(United States) Jordan Allen	FW	retired		11/21/19
(United States) Alex Horwath	GK	retired		11/21/19
(Ecuador) Joao Plata	FW	(Mexico) Toluca	option declined	11/21/19
(United States) Kelyn Rowe	MF	(United States) New England Revolution	out of contract	11/21/19
(United States) Brooks Lennon	DF/FW	(United States) Atlanta United FC	Trade for $300,000 in GAM and TAM	12/2/19
(United States) Sebastian Saucedo	MF	(Mexico) Pumas UNAM	out of contract	12/9/19
(Venezuela) Jefferson Savarino	FW	(Brazil) Atletico Mineiro	$2,000,000	2/7/20

Notes

1. Option Declined (OPT): Players who have had their option declined may still be resigned by the club under a new contract.
2. Free Agent (FREE): Players who are out of contract may still be resigned by the club under a new contract.

=== Loans ===
==== In ====
Player	Position	Loaned From	Fees/Notes	Date

==== Out ====
Player	Position	Loaned To	Fees/Notes	Date

=== Trialist ===
Player	Position	Previous team	Notes	Date	Result
(Canada) Dayonn Harris	FW	UConn	2020 MLS SuperDraft pick #20	01/9/20	
(United States) Michael Wetungu	DF	Michigan State	2020 MLS SuperDraft pick #46.	01/9/20	
