= Jeff Dewsnup =

American musician and footballer (born 2004)

- Born: Jeffrey Dewsnup; May 21, 2004 (age 22); Herriman, Utah
- Occupations: singer; songwriter; record producer
- Musical career
- Genres: Alternative pop; Indie pop; Lo-fi
- Label: Major Tom’s
Association football career
- Height: 6 ft 1 in (1.85 m)
- Position: Goalkeeper
Youth career
- La Roca FC
- 2018–2021: Real Salt Lake
Senior career*
Years	Team	Apps	(Gls)
2021–2022	Real Salt Lake	0	(0)
2021–2022	Real Monarchs	19	(0)
International career
2020–2022	United States U17	1	(0)
- * Club domestic league appearances and goals

Jeffrey "Jeff" Dewsnup (born May 21, 2004) is an American musician, songwriter, and producer. Dewsnup is also a professional soccer player who played as a goalkeeper for Major League Soccer club Real Salt Lake.

== Early life and soccer career ==
Jeffrey was born and raised in Herriman, Utah, starting playing soccer for a club side in his hometown before joining La Roca FC, a Utah youth club.

=== Real Salt Lake ===
In 2018, Dewsnup joined the youth setup at Major League Soccer club Real Salt Lake. He spent the majority of his time in the academy playing with the under-16/17s. On July 11, 2020, Dewsnup was called-in to Real Monarchs, the reserve affiliate for Real Salt Lake, for their match against San Diego Loyal but did not come off the bench.

On January 12, 2021, Dewsnup signed a professional homegrown player contract with Real Salt Lake, becoming the club's youngest player in their history. He was also the club's 24th signing from their academy.

Dewsnup made his senior debut for Real Monarchs, the reserve affiliate for Real Salt Lake, on May 8, 2021, against San Antonio FC. He started and played the entire match as Real Monarchs drew 2–2.

Following the 2022 Major League Soccer season, Dewsnup chose to retire from professional soccer at age 18, in order to pursue music and focus on personal mental health.

In June 2026, Dewsnup alleged harassment from four Real Salt Lake teammates, Aaron Herrera, David Ochoa, Tate Schmitt, and Justen Glad, in a lawsuit seeking $100 million in damages.

=== International career ===
Dewsnup has been called up to represent the United States at the under-15 and under-17 levels. He made his debut for the under-17 side on February 24, 2021, against Denmark, starting in a 6–1 defeat.

== Music career ==
The same year Jeffrey retired from professional soccer, he debuted under a indie-duo band named The Johns with their first single, released on May 9, 2022, "The North Star", it was produced, written, and mastered by Jeff himself. Following that he released several other singles, but "Red Tears", released on February 23, 2024, tracked some attention online. The song is dedicated to survivors of sexual abuse, the counting lyrics and melodies are resonating with the trauma and guilt, that survivors feel after the matter. A portion of profit made off of this song is donated to charity for sexual abuse survivors. The track now counts over three million streams on Spotify. These singles were first released under the band name, however due to these songs being 100% written, produced, and recorded by himself, he later released them onto his personal catalog.

=== Solo career ===
On August 9, 2024, he released his debut solo double-album, A Poison Tree and A Poison Tree (In The Fog), which he wrote, recorded, and mastered himself. The album is characterized by its lo-fi, cinematic sound, blending elements of post-punk, shoegaze, electronic music, and film scores. Dewsnup's whisper-pop vocal style and introspective lyrics delve into themes of depression, anxiety, and personal struggle. The album received critical acclaim for its emotional depth and authenticity, with SLUG magazine describing it as "a record of love and bravery at an elite level".

Following the release of his debut, on October 31, 2024, Jeff released his third solo LP, A Ghost In The Headlights, under a collective envisioned by himself and his friend, Jack Briscoe, Major Tom's.

=== Cove Grove (2025 - present) ===
Early in 2025, Jeff started another project called Cove Grove with his partner, and released the debut single, "Better Off Dead", which seems to be promoting the duo's proclaimed debut concept album, The Shadow. The project gained some traction on TikTok, where they were teasing each track off the album.
