= Aaron Herrera (footballer) =

Guatemalan footballer (born 1997)

Aarón Herrera
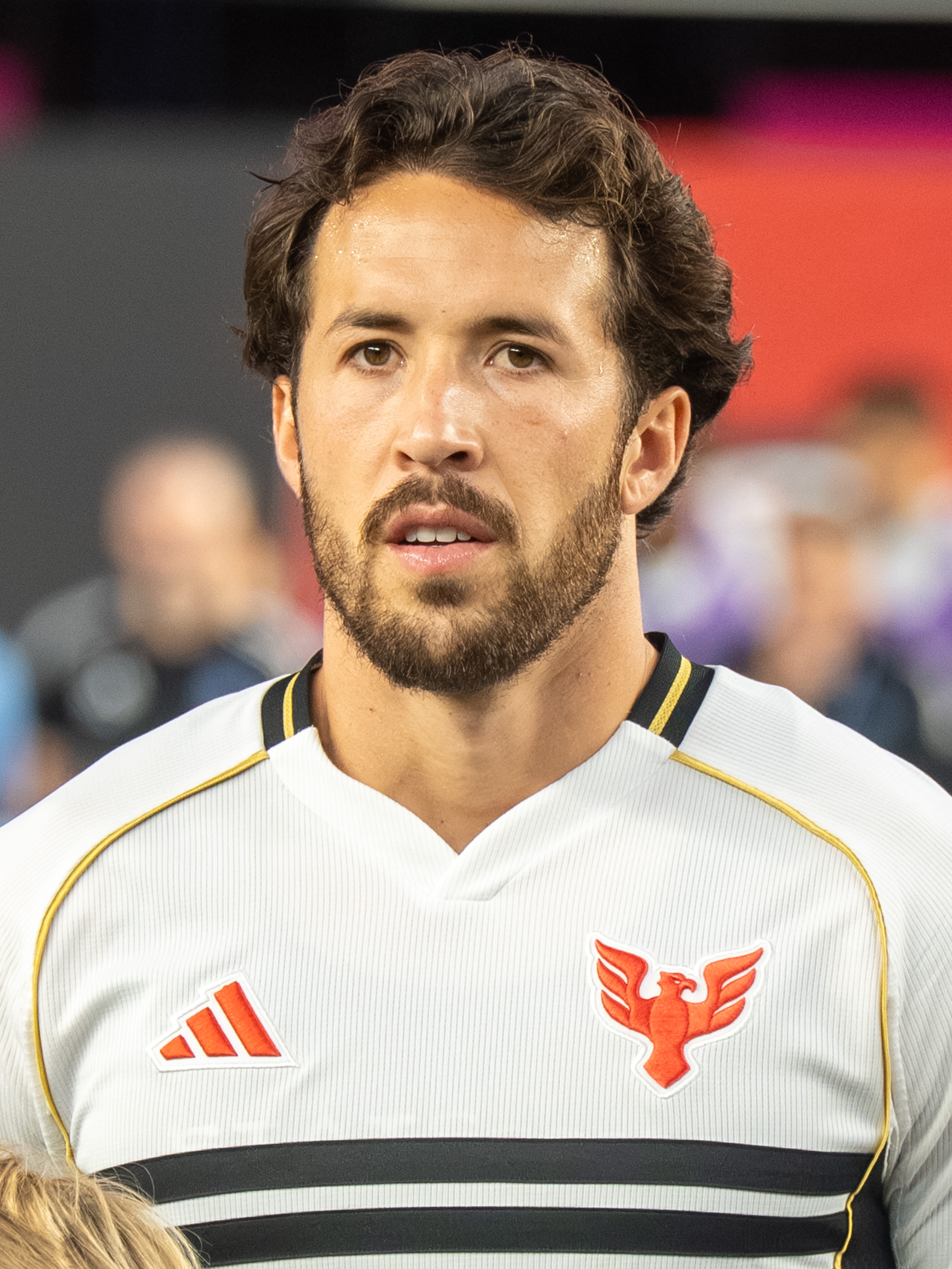
- Herrera with DC United in 2025

Personal information
- Full name: Aarón Joseph Herrera
- Date of birth: 6 June 1997 (age 29)
- Place of birth: Las Cruces, New Mexico, U.S
- Height: 1.80 m (5 ft 11 in)
- Position: Defender

Youth career
- 2012–2015: Real Salt Lake AZ

College career
Years	Team	Apps	(Gls)
2015–2017	New Mexico Lobos	54	(7)

Senior career*
Years	Team	Apps	(Gls)
2016–2017	FC Tucson	11	(0)
2018–2022	Real Salt Lake	124	(1)
2018	Real Monarchs	5	(0)
2022–2023	CF Montréal	19	(0)
2024–2026	D.C. United	63	(1)

International career^{‡}
2017	United States U20	3	(0)
2019–2021	United States U23	6	(0)
2021	United States	1	(0)
2023–	Guatemala	32	(0)
Medal record
Representing United States
Winner	CONCACAF U-20 Championship	2017
- * Club domestic league appearances and goals as of 25 October 2025 ‡ National team caps and goals as of 16 November 2026

Aarón Joseph Herrera (born 6 June 1997) is a professional footballer who plays as a defender. Born in the United States, he represents the Guatemala national team.

Herrera made one appearance for the United States national team, before switching to play for Guatemala.

== Early life ==
Born in Las Cruces, New Mexico, Herrera played three years of college soccer at the University of New Mexico between 2015 and 2017, scoring 20 goals and tallying 8 assists in 54 appearances.

== Club career ==
=== FC Tucson ===
Herrera also played with Premier Development League side FC Tucson in 2016 and 2017.

=== Real Salt Lake ===
On 15 December 2017, Herrera signed as a Homegrown Player for Real Salt Lake of Major League Soccer.

=== CF Montréal ===
On 21 December 2022, Herrera was traded to CF Montréal for $500,000 in General Allocation Money, a 2023 international roster spot, Montréal's 2023 MLS SuperDraft first-round pick and a sell-on fee.

=== D.C. United ===
On 12 December 2023, D.C. United acquired Herrera from CF Montréal in exchange for Brazilian defender Ruan and $500,000 in 2024 General Allocation Money. During his maiden season with the club, Herrera was named to the 2024 MLS All-Star Team. On 1 June 2026, former Real Salt Lake player Jeff Dewsnup sued the club after alleging former teammates, including Herrera, hazed him in the shower and lockeroom. Herrera was waived by D.C. United on 10 June 2026.

== International career ==
=== United States ===
Internationally, Herrera had represented the United States U20s. In January 2021, Herrera made one appearance for the senior United States in a 7–0 friendly win over Trinidad and Tobago.

He was named to the final 20-player United States under-23 roster for the 2020 CONCACAF Men's Olympic Qualifying Championship in March 2021.

=== Guatemala ===
In June 2023, Herrera was named to Guatemala's preliminary squad ahead of the 2023 CONCACAF Gold Cup. He made his Guatemala debut on 15 June in a friendly match against Costa Rica.

In the 2025 CONCACAF Gold Cup quarter finals against Canada, Herrera was a critical player in Guatemala's penalty kicks victory, completing a goal-line clearance and scoring in the penalty shootout against Dayne St. Clair – marking Guatemala's first appearance in the Gold Cup semi-finals since 1996.

== Personal life ==
Herrera was born in the United States to a Guatemalan father, Diego Herrera and American mother, Donni Herrera.

== Career statistics ==
=== Club ===
As of match played 19 October 2025

Appearances and goals by club, season and competition
Club	Season	League			Cup		Continental		Other		Total	
Club	Season	Division	Apps	Goals	Apps	Goals	Apps	Goals	Apps	Goals	Apps	Goals
Real Monarchs	2018	United Soccer League	5	0	—		—		—		5	0
Real Salt Lake	2018	Major League Soccer	16	0	1 (Note: Appearance in U.S. Open Cup)	0	—		3 (Note: Appearance(s) in MLS Cup Playoffs)	0	20	0
Real Salt Lake	2019	Major League Soccer	32	0	—		1 (Note: Appearance(s) in Leagues Cup)	0	2	0	35	0
Real Salt Lake	2020	Major League Soccer	20	0	—		—		1 (Note: Appearance in MLS is Back Tournament knockout stage)	0	21	0
Real Salt Lake	2021	Major League Soccer	29	1	—		—		3	0	32	1
Real Salt Lake	2022	Major League Soccer	27	0	—		—		—		27	0
Real Salt Lake	Total		124	1	1	0	1	0	9	0	135	1
CF Montréal	2023	Major League Soccer	19	0	2 (Note: Appearances in Canadian Championship)	0	2	0	—		23	0
D.C. United	2024	Major League Soccer	30	1	0	0	3	0	—		33	1
D.C. United	2025	Major League Soccer	26	0	3	0	—		—		29	0
D.C. United	Total		56	1	3	0	3	0	0	0	62	1
Career total			204	2	6	0	6	0	9	0	225	2

=== International ===
As of match played 16 November 2026

Appearances and goals by national team and year
National team	Year	Apps	Goals
United States	2021	1	0
United States	Total	1	0
Guatemala	2023	6	0
Guatemala	2024	6	0
Guatemala	2025	13	0
Guatemala	2026	7	0
Guatemala	Total	32	0
Career total		33	0

== Honours ==
United States U20

- CONCACAF Under-20 Championship: 2017

Individual

- MLS All-Star: 2024
