= Justin Meram =

Iraqi footballer (born 1988)

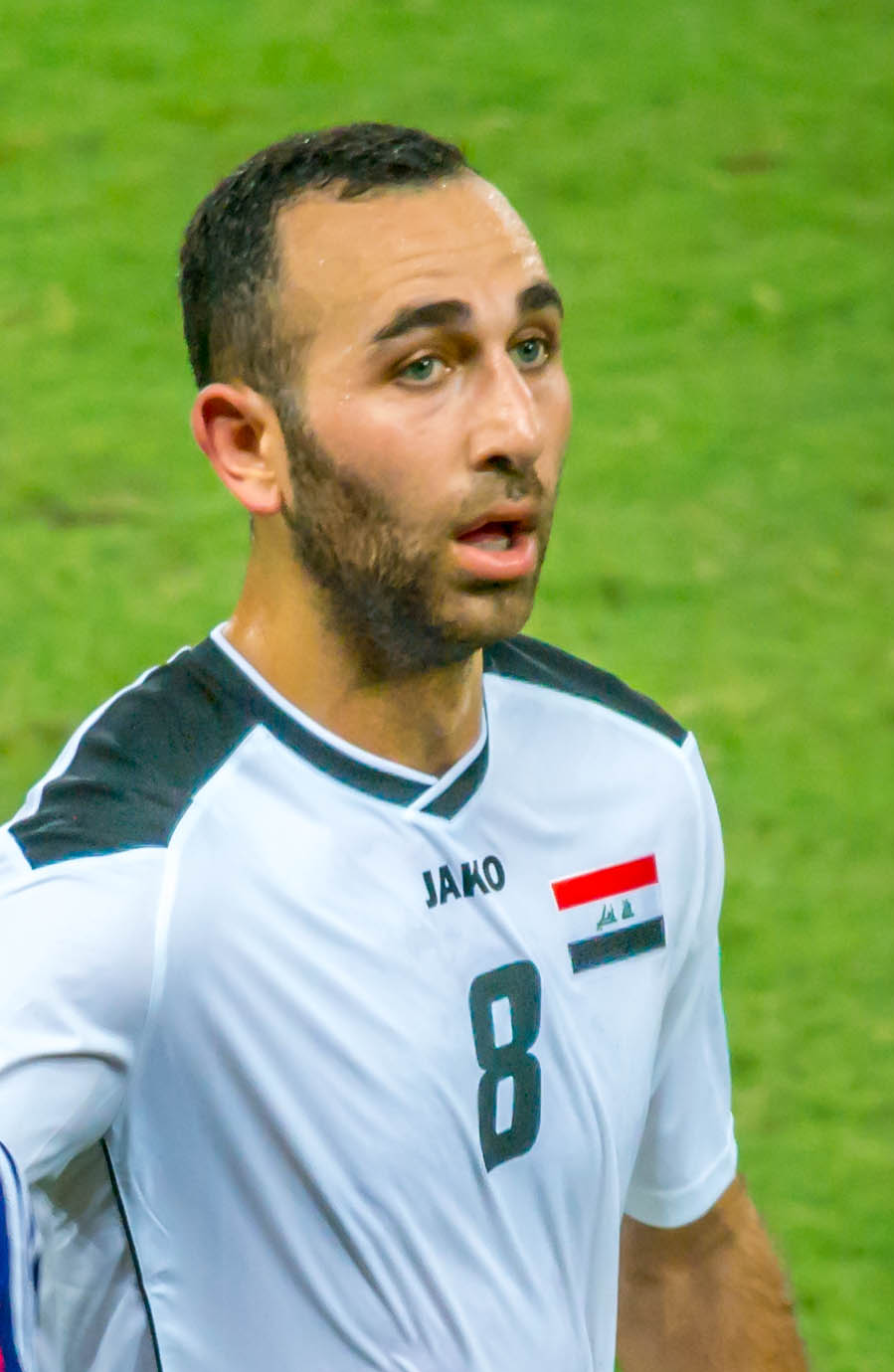
- Meram with Iraq in 2015

Personal information
- Full name: Justin Joseph Meram; Justin Hikmat Azeez Meram
- Date of birth: December 4, 1988 (age 37)
- Place of birth: Shelby Charter Township, Michigan, United States
- Height: 1.85 m (6 ft 1 in)
- Position: Winger

College career
Years	Team	Apps	(Gls)
2007–2008	Yavapai Roughriders	52	(51)
2009–2010	Michigan Wolverines	41	(24)

Senior career*
Years	Team	Apps	(Gls)
2007–2008	Arizona Sahuaros		
2011–2017	Columbus Crew	188	(37)
2018	Orlando City SC	17	(1)
2018–2019	Columbus Crew	18	(1)
2019	Atlanta United FC	20	(4)
2020–2023	Real Salt Lake	85	(8)
2023	Charlotte FC	14	(3)
2024	Michigan Stars	0	(0)
2025	Des Moines Menace	0	(0)

International career^{‡}
2014–2022	Iraq	36	(4)
- * Club domestic league appearances and goals as of 4 April 2024 ‡ National team caps and goals as of 28 March 2022

Justin Joseph Meram (born December 4, 1988), known as Justin Hikmat Azeez Meram (Note: Arabic: جستن حكمت عزيز ميرام) in Iraq, is an Iraqi former professional footballer who played as a winger. Born in the United States, he played for the Iraq national team.

== Career ==
=== College and amateur ===
Meram attended Eisenhower High School in Michigan, and played for local side Vardar, before going on to play two years of college soccer at Yavapai College in Arizona. Meram was a program standout at Yavapai, leading his team to back-to-back NJCAA National Championships, earning 2008 National Junior College Player of the Year honors, being named a NSCAA and NJCAA All-American, earning ACCAC Conference Player of the Year honors, and being named MVP at both the national and regional tournaments during the 2007 season, while setting a school record for points and finished second all-time in goals and assists.

He transferred to the University of Michigan as a junior in 2009, where he was named to the All-Big Ten second team both years, and to the NSCAA All-GreatLakes Region second team in his senior year in 2010. He finished his college career with 24 goals and 14 assists in 41 games for the Wolverines.

During his college years in Arizona, Meram also played with the Arizona Sahuaros, both in the National Premier Soccer League and in local amateur USASA competitions.

== Club career ==
=== Columbus Crew ===
On January 14, 2011, Meram was drafted in the first round (15th overall) in the 2011 MLS SuperDraft by Columbus Crew. He made his professional debut on February 22, 2011, as a second-half substitute in the first leg of the Crew's CONCACAF Champions League quarter-final series against Real Salt Lake, and made his MLS debut on May 28 as a late substitute in a 3–3 tie with Chivas USA.

Meram made his MLS regular season debut on May 28 against Chivas USA. Meram started and recorded an assist in the Crew's U.S. Open Cup match against Richmond Kickers. Meram appeared in both quarterfinal matches against Real Salt Lake as a substitute in the 2010-11 CONCACAF Champions League.

In his second season, Meram made 22 appearances and 11 starts to score four goals and record one assist in 960 minutes. Meram recorded goals in three consecutive games during the month of May against FC Dallas, San Jose Earthquakes and Seattle Sounders FC. He also scored the game-winner in the 89th minute on September 19.

Meram made 19 appearances split between right midfield, left midfield and forward in his third season with the Black & Gold, recording one goal and one assist. His appearances included eight starts and five substitute appearances at left midfield, one start and three substitute appearances at right midfield and two substitute appearances at forward. He made his season debut against San Jose (March 16) and his first start of the year at right wing in the match at Toronto FC (May 18). In his second straight start at right midfield at New York Red Bulls (May 26), he was awarded a penalty which led to a Federico Higuaín goal. Meram made starts in the right midfield at Philadelphia Union (June 5) and against New York (August 10) but did not travel to the match at Real Salt Lake (August 24) suffering from back spasms. He returned to action with a start at left midfield against Seattle (August 31) and in the next match against Houston Dynamo (September 4) scored his first goal and recorded his first assist—the game-winner—of the season in a start at left midfield in the 2–0 win. In MLS Reserve League action, he made nine starts – five at forward and four in the midfield—scoring one goal and recording one assist. In the 2013 Lamar Hunt U.S. Open Cup, he made two appearances – including one start at forward—and scored the game-winning goal in the 84th minute in the Third Round win against Dayton Dutch Lions (May 29) after subbing-on.

Meram made 32 appearances—including 19 starts—at midfield as part of a breakout campaign. He scored eight goals and assisted on four others, career-bests in both categories. Meram appeared in the season-opening win at D.C. United (March 8) and recorded his first assist of the season. He was an 89th-minute sub and scored the game-winning goal in the fourth minute of stoppage time at Seattle (March 29). He made his first start of the season at left midfield against New York (April 26) and drew a penalty that led to a Columbus goal. Meram came on as a late-match substitute at New England Revolution (July 26) and assisted on Ethan Finlay's match-winning goal. He scored his third goal of the season in a second-half substitute appearance versus Toronto FC (August 9). He scored the opening goal versus the LA Galaxy (August 16) and added an assist later in the contest. Meram repeated the one-goal, one-assist effort for the second consecutive match in a start versus Houston (August 23). He started in the club's final nine League matches of the regular season, recording his first career brace versus Chivas USA (September 7) and scoring again at Philadelphia (October 11). Meram made his postseason debut and scored his first MLS Cup Playoffs goal in a start versus New England (November 1) -- he started the second leg at New England (November 9) and recorded his first career MLS Cup Playoffs assist. Meram made two Lamar Hunt U.S. Open Cup appearances, including one start in tournament action—he made a substitute appearance in the 2–1 win over Indy Eleven in the Fourth Round (June 17) and started at forward in the Fifth Round at Chicago Fire Soccer Club (June 25). Following the season, he received his first-ever international call-up, making three caps for Iraq at the 22nd Arabian Gulf Cup.

Meram made 31 appearances (28 starts) at left midfield in 2015, scoring six goals and notching five assists. He started the home opener against Toronto FC (March 14) and registered the game-winning goal. He missed the club's match against New York (March 28) while on international duty with the Iraq National Team, but returned with a start at Vancouver Whitecaps FC (April 8), where he recorded his first assist of the season. He scored in consecutive matches following a tally against Philadelphia (April 25). Meram recorded his second assist of the season with a helper on Kei Kamara's second goal vs. Seattle (May 9) and earned his third assist via Kei Kamara's eighth-minute goal vs. Chicago (May 22), which was the 500th-ever home regular-season goal in Black & Gold history. He started the club's international friendly vs. Valencia CF (May 27) and made his 100th appearance in MLS and for Crew with a start at Orlando City SC (May 30). Meram received his second international call-up of the season from the Iraq National Team and earned his 14th cap by starting the team's friendly at Japan (June 11). He recorded assists in back-to-back games for the second time in his career with a helper at Orlando (August 1). Once again, Meram received a call-up by Iraq ahead of two 2018 FIFA World Cup qualifiers, scoring his first international goal against Chinese Taipei (September 3) and his second against Thailand (September 8). He earned an additional call-up and started for Iraq in a 2018 FIFA World Cup qualifying match at Vietnam (October 8). In the 2015 MLS Cup Playoffs, Meram started all five games for Crew, scoring the fastest goal in MLS postseason history (nine seconds) in the First Leg against the New York Red Bulls in the Eastern Conference Championship (November 22). Meram made a substitute appearance in both Crew's 2015 Lamar Hunt U.S. Open Cup Fourth Round contest at Richmond (June 17) and its Round of 16 match at Orlando (June 30).

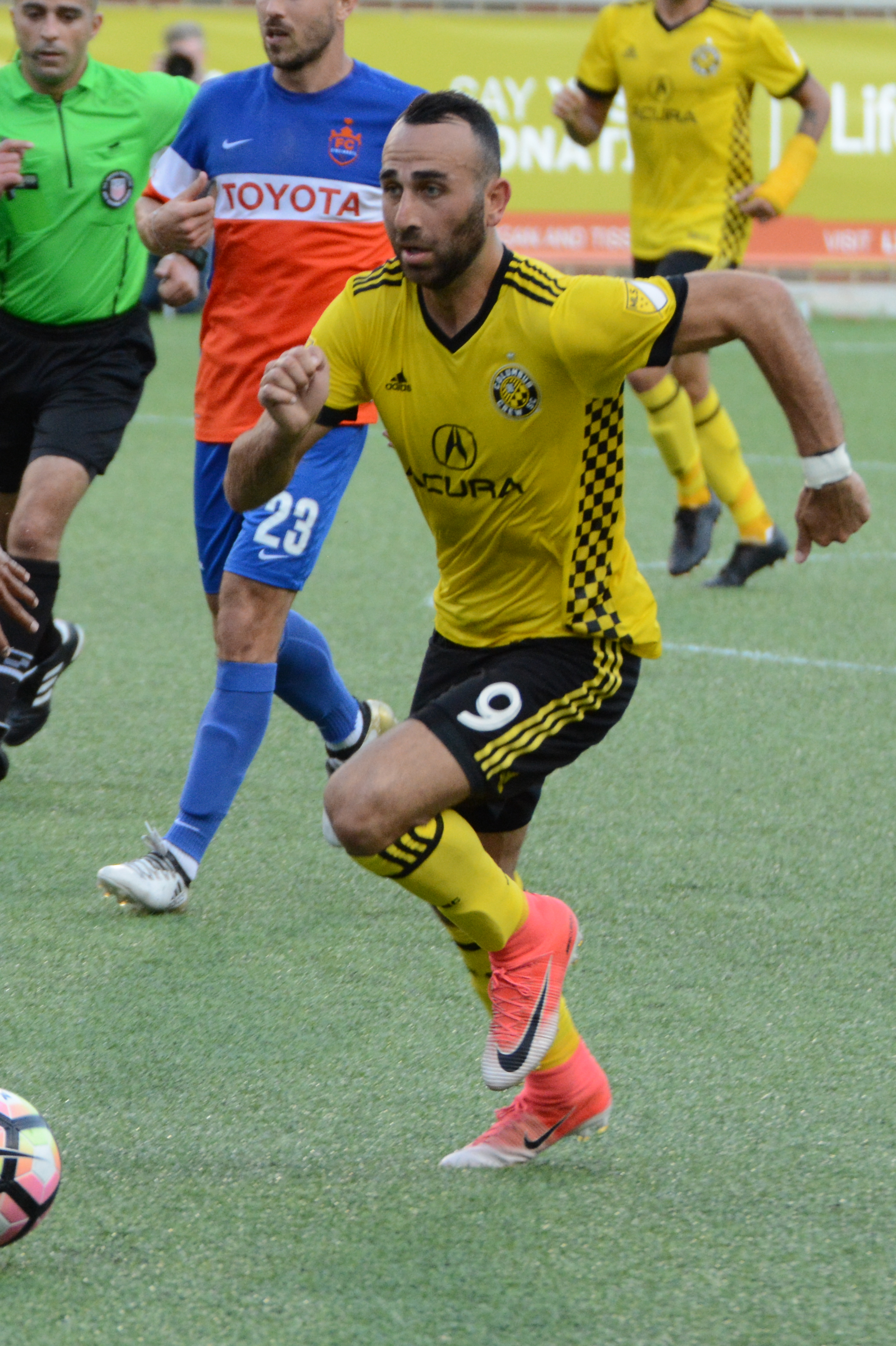
Meram with Columbus in 2017

=== Orlando City ===
On January 29, 2018, Orlando City acquired midfielder Justin Meram from Columbus Crew in exchange for $1.05 million in allocation money plus a 2019 international roster spot. He made his debut in the season opener against D.C. United on March 4 and scored his first goal for Orlando against Atlanta on May 14. On August 3, after a difficult spell at Orlando, Meram was traded back to Columbus in return for $750,000 in TAM and a 2019 international roster spot.

=== Atlanta United ===
On May 7, 2019, Meram joined defending MLS champions Atlanta United FC for $100,000 in GAM and a 2nd round draft pick. Atlanta United technical director Carlos Bocanegra described Meram as a "proven commodity in MLS." On June 29, 2019, Meram scored a brace to help his side to a 2–1 win over the Montreal Impact. His contract option was not renewed at the end of the season.

=== Real Salt Lake ===
On February 11, 2020, Meram signed with Real Salt Lake. In January 2022, Real Salt Lake announced that they extended Meram's contract through the 2023 MLS season.

=== Charlotte FC ===
On April 27, 2023, Charlotte FC announced that they acquired Meram from Real Salt Lake in exchange for $200,000 in general allocation money (GAM). On May 13, 2023, Meram scored his first goals for Charlotte, with a brace in their 3–1 victory over his former club Atlanta United.

=== Michigan Stars ===
Meram joined the Michigan Stars in April 2024, starting in the club's 2–0 win over Minnesota United FC 2 in the second round of the 2024 U.S. Open Cup.

== International career ==
In 2013, Meram began a two-year process to gain dual citizenship to become eligible to represent Iraq. On September 16, 2013, Iraq coach Hakeem Shaker called up Meram for a training session in preparation for a 2015 AFC Asian Cup qualification match against Saudi Arabia.

In October 2014, Meram was called up for a friendly against Yemen but did not attend as his club team, the Crew, were still involved in the 2014 MLS Cup Playoffs. On November 10, 2014, Meram was included in Iraq's final roster ahead of their group stage matches of the 22nd Arabian Gulf Cup. Meram became the first player in Major League Soccer history to be called up by Iraq. When asked in 2014 about representing Iraq internationally, Meram said, "My goal was (to represent) Iraq from day one."

Meram went on to make his international debut, a start in the midfield, in Iraq's opening match of the tournament against Kuwait on November 14, 2014. Meram went on to play the full 90 minutes of the eventual 0–1 loss. In the match, Meram had several chances at goal, including a shot cleared off the line by a Kuwaiti defender just before halftime.

Meram earned his second call-up to participate in training camp and friendlies ahead of the 2015 AFC Asian Cup. In December 2014, it was announced that Meram was called into Iraq's camp for four friendlies in the following weeks against Kuwait, Iran, and two against Uzbekistan. At that time, he was also named to Iraq's squad for the 2015 AFC Asian Cup to be held in Australia in January 2015. Meram made his competitive debut as a second-half substitute in Iraq's first match and second match of the tournament, a 1–0 victory over Jordan on January 12, 2015, and a 1–0 loss to Japan. He started the Lions of Mesopotamia's final Group stage match against Palestine (January 20), helping Iraq to a 2–0 win and qualification for the Quarterfinals. Meram started that Quarterfinal match against Iran, playing 45 minutes in a match that Iraq eventually won on penalties 3-3 (7–6). The match represented Meram's 10th cap for Iraq. Meram scored his first goal for Iraq on September 3, 2015, converting a 91st-minute penalty as his side defeated Chinese Taipei 5–1 in 2018 FIFA World Cup qualification.

On October 18, 2021, Meram announced his retirement from international soccer. However, on March 19, 2022, he was recalled for matches against Syria and the United Arab Emirates.

== Personal life ==
Justin was the youngest of Hikmat "Sam" Aziz Meram and Lamia Mansour Hormis' four sons. He and his parents are ethnic Assyrians from the Tel Keppe District of Mosul. Their religious background is Chaldean Catholic. His parents immigrated to the United States and met in the Detroit area. Justin's father came to the United States in 1967 while his mother arrived in 1975. Meram's Iraqi passport lists his name as Justin Hikmat Aziz (with his first name, father's name, and the name of his grandfather), following local naming conventions.

== Career statistics ==
=== Club ===
As of October 30, 2022

Club	Season	League			Playoffs		National cup		Continental		Total	
Club	Season	Division	Apps	Goals	Apps	Goals	Apps	Goals	Apps	Goals	Apps	Goals
Columbus Crew	2011	MLS	17	0	0	0	1	0	2	0	20	0
Columbus Crew	2012	MLS	22	4	–		1	0	–		23	4
Columbus Crew	2013	MLS	19	1	–		2	1	–		21	2
Columbus Crew	2014	MLS	32	8	2	1	2	0	–		36	9
Columbus Crew	2015	MLS	31	6	5	1	2	0	–		38	7
Columbus Crew	2016	MLS	33	5	–		2	1	–		35	6
Columbus Crew	2017	MLS	34	13	5	1	1	0	–		40	14
Columbus Crew	Total		188	37	12	3	11	2	2	0	213	42
Orlando City SC	2018	MLS	17	1	–		1	1	–		18	2
Columbus Crew	2018	MLS	9	1	3	0	0	0	–		12	1
Columbus Crew	2019	MLS	9	0	–		0	0	–		9	0
Columbus Crew	Total		18	1	3	0	0	0	0	0	21	1
Atlanta United FC	2019	MLS	20	4	1	0	5	0	1 (Note: Includes 1 appearance in the Campeones Cup)	0	27	4
Real Salt Lake	2020	MLS	21	3	1 (Note: Includes 1 appearance in the MLS Is Back Tournament knockout round)	0	–		–		22	3
Real Salt Lake	2021	MLS	31	2	0	0	–		–		31	2
Real Salt Lake	2022	MLS	33	3	0	0	–		–		33	3
Career total			328	51	17	3	17	3	3	0	365	57

=== International ===
As of March 28, 2022

Iraq
Year	Apps	Goals
2014	5	0
2015	12	2
2016	5	0
2017	3	1
2018	4	0
2019	4	1
2021	2	0
2022	1	0
Total	36	4

Scores and results list Iraq's goal tally first.

#	Date	Venue	Opponent	Score	Result	Competition
1.	September 3, 2015	PAS Stadium, Tehran, Iran	Chinese Taipei	5–1	5–1	2018 FIFA World Cup qualification
2.	September 8, 2015	Rajamangala Stadium, Bangkok, Thailand	Thailand	1–0	2–2	2018 FIFA World Cup qualification
3.	August 31, 2017	Rajamangala Stadium, Bangkok, Thailand	Thailand	1–0	2–1	2018 FIFA World Cup qualification
4.	March 20, 2019	Basra Sports City, Basra, Iraq	Syria	1–0	1–0	2019 International Friendship Championship

== Honors ==
Atlanta United

- Campeones Cup: 2019
- U.S. Open Cup: 2019

== See also ==
- List of Iraq international footballers
