= Damir Kreilach =

Croatian footballer (born 1989)

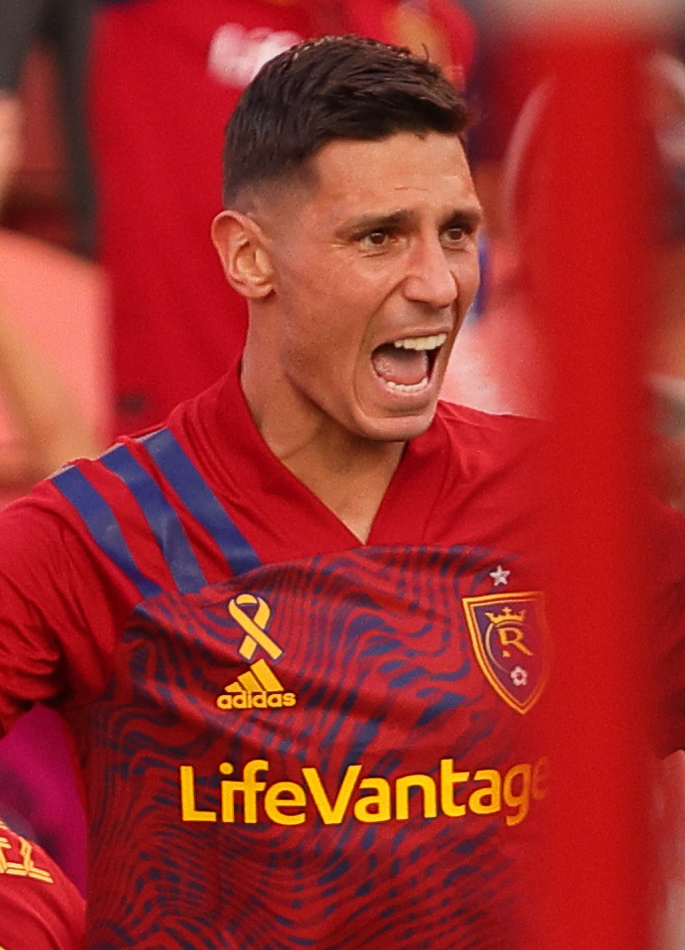
- Kreilach with Real Salt Lake in 2021

Personal information
- Date of birth: 16 April 1989 (age 37)
- Place of birth: Vukovar, SR Croatia, Yugoslavia
- Height: 1.86 m (6 ft 1 in)
- Position: Midfielder

Team information
- Current team: Rijeka
- Number: 87

Youth career
- 1995–2000: Opatija
- 2000–2007: Rijeka

Senior career*
Years	Team	Apps	(Gls)
2007–2013	Rijeka	128	(19)
2013–2018	Union Berlin	149	(33)
2018–2023	Real Salt Lake	151	(47)
2024–2025	Vancouver Whitecaps	21	(3)
2025–2026	Rijeka	2	(0)

International career^{‡}
2008	Croatia U19	4	(0)
2010	Croatia U21	4	(1)
- * Club domestic league appearances and goals as of 18 July 2025 ‡ National team caps and goals as of 9 October 2010

Damir Kreilach (German pronunciation: [daːmɪr kraɪlach]; born 16 April 1989) is a former Croatian professional footballer who played as a midfielder.

== Career ==
Kreilach began his professional career with Rijeka in the Croatian first division, making his debut at 18 years old in the 2007–08 season, eventually playing 128 matches in six seasons while scoring 19 goals. He was the club's top goalscorer in the 2011–12 season with nine goals.

He then moved to Union Berlin in the German second division for five seasons, scoring 33 goals in 147 matches, highlighted by a 12-goal season in 32 matches in 2015–16.

In February 2018, Kreilach signed with Real Salt Lake of Major League Soccer. In his time at the club, he became the club's third highest-ever goalscorer with 47 goals, and acted as club captain during the 2022 and 2023 seasons. Kreilach left the club after six seasons in December 2023, joining fellow MLS side Vancouver Whitecaps FC.

On September 26 2026, Kreilach gets honoured ina friendly played between Union Berlin and Rijeka, where he would play for both teams to call it a career

== Career statistics ==
As of 4 March 2018

Appearances and goals by club, season and competition
Club	Season	League			Cup		Continental		Total	
Club	Season	Division	Apps	Goals	Apps	Goals	Apps	Goals	Apps	Goals
Rijeka	2007–08	Prva HNL	5	0	–		–		5	0
Rijeka	2008–09	Prva HNL	13	1	1	0	2	0	16	1
Rijeka	2009–10	Prva HNL	25	2	2	0	3	0	30	2
Rijeka	2010–11	Prva HNL	28	2	3	0	–		31	2
Rijeka	2011–12	Prva HNL	27	9	4	0	–		31	9
Rijeka	2012–13	Prva HNL	30	5	1	0	–		31	5
Rijeka	Total		128	19	11	0	5	0	144	19
Union Berlin	2013–14	2. Bundesliga	32	3	3	0	–		35	3
Union Berlin	2014–15	2. Bundesliga	33	7	1	0	–		34	7
Union Berlin	2015–16	2. Bundesliga	32	12	1	0	–		33	12
Union Berlin	2016–17	2. Bundesliga	33	9	1	0	–		34	9
Union Berlin	2017–18	2. Bundesliga	19	2	2	0	–		21	2
Union Berlin	Total		149	33	8	0	0	0	157	33
Real Salt Lake	2018	MLS	33	12	3 (Note: Appearance(s) in MLS Cup Playoffs)	3	–		36	15
Real Salt Lake	2019	MLS	32	6	3 (Note: Two Appearances, one goal in 2019 MLS Cup Playoffs; one appearance in 2019 US Open Cup)	1	1 (Note: Appearance(s) in Leagues Cup)	0	36	7
Real Salt Lake	2020	MLS	21	8	1 (Note: Appearance(s) in MLS is Back Tournament Knockout Stage)	1	–		22	9
Real Salt Lake	2021	MLS	33	16	1 (Note: Appearance(s) in MLS Cup Playoffs)	0	–		34	16
Real Salt Lake	2022	MLS	5	1	0	0	–		5	1
Real Salt Lake	2023	MLS	27	4	6 (Note: Five Appearances, four goals in 2023 US Open Cup, one appearance in 2023 MLS Cup Playoffs)	4	–		33	8
Real Salt Lake	Total		151	47	14	9	1	0	166	56
Career total			428	99	33	9	6	0	467	108

== Honours ==
Vancouver Whitecaps

2024 Canadian Championship

MLS All Star game: 2021
