= Andrew Putna =

American soccer player

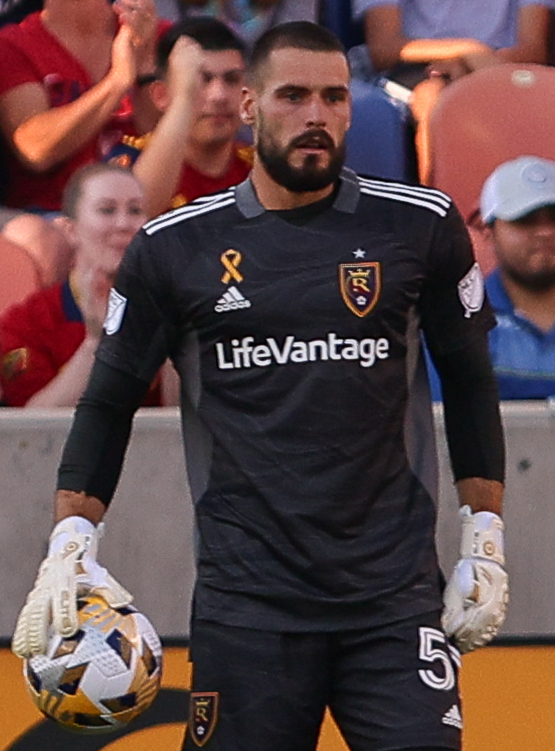
- Putna with Real Salt Lake in 2021

Personal information
- Date of birth: October 21, 1994 (age 32)
- Place of birth: Lemont, Illinois, United States
- Height: 6 ft 2 in (1.88 m)
- Position: Goalkeeper

Youth career
- –2011: Raiders FC
- 2011–2013: Chicago Magic

College career
Years	Team	Apps	(Gls)
2013–2016	UIC Flames	74	(0)

Senior career*
Years	Team	Apps	(Gls)
2014–2016	Chicago Fire U-23	12	(0)
2017–2021	Real Monarchs	24	(0)
2018–2021	Real Salt Lake	25	(0)
- * Club domestic league appearances and goals as of November 5, 2021

Andrew Putna (born October 21, 1994) is an American professional soccer player.

== Career ==
=== College and amateur ===
Putna played club soccer with Raiders FC and Chicago Magic, and college soccer at the University of Illinois at Chicago between 2013 and 2016. During his college off-season's, he played in the USL Premier Development League with Chicago Fire U-23.

=== Professional ===
Putna was drafted in the third round (48th overall) of the 2017 MLS SuperDraft by Real Salt Lake. He joined Salt Lake's United Soccer League affiliate Real Monarchs in March 2017.

On July 13, 2018, Putna moved to Real Salt Lake. In October 2021, Real Salt Lake received a report alleging that Putna had made derogatory remarks referencing teammate David Ochoa's national origin during first-team training. The club reported the matter to Major League Soccer in accordance with league protocol, and MLS opened an investigation. The league concluded that Putna had made derogatory remarks referencing another player’s ethnicity. During the investigation, Putna was separated from the team and prohibited from participating in team activities, causing him to miss two matches.
