= Jeizon Ramírez =

Venezuelan footballer (born 2001)

Personal information
- Full name: Jeizon Jesús Ramírez Chacón
- Date of birth: 24 March 2001 (age 25)
- Place of birth: San Cristóbal, Venezuela
- Height: 1.69 m (5 ft 7 in)
- Position: Winger

Team information
- Current team: Metropolitanos
- Number: 10

Senior career*
Years	Team	Apps	(Gls)
2017–2020	Deportivo Táchira	63	(6)
2020–2021	Real Salt Lake	10	(0)
2021	Real Monarchs	6	(1)
2022	Deportivo Táchira	20	(0)
2023	Zamora	9	(0)
2024–2025	Portuguesa	23	(2)
2025–	Metropolitanos	42	(6)
- * Club domestic league appearances and goals as of 12 January 2024

Jeizon Jesús Ramírez Chacón (born 24 March 2001) is a Venezuelan footballer who plays as a winger for Metropolitanos.

== Career statistics ==
=== Club ===
As of 7 February 2020.

Club	Season	League			Cup		Continental		Other		Total	
Club	Season	Division	Apps	Goals	Apps	Goals	Apps	Goals	Apps	Goals	Apps	Goals
Deportivo Táchira	2017	Primera División	5	0	0	0	0	0	0	0	5	0
Deportivo Táchira	2018	Primera División	24	3	1 (Note: Appearances in the Copa Venezuela)	0	0	0	0	0	25	3
Deportivo Táchira	2019	Primera División	33	3	2	1	0	0	0	0	35	4
Deportivo Táchira	2020	Primera División	1	0	0	0	0	0	0	0	1	0
Deportivo Táchira	Total		63	6	3	1	0	0	0	0	66	7
Real Salt Lake	2020	Major League Soccer	0	0	0	0	0	0	0	0	0	0
Real Salt Lake	2021	Major League Soccer	0	0	0	0	0	0	0	0	0	0
Real Monarchs	2021	USL Championship	1	1	—		—		—		1	1
Career total			64	7	3	1	0	0	0	0	67	8
