= Julián Vázquez =

Mexican footballer (born 2001)

Personal information
- Full name: Julián Vázquez
- Date of birth: March 30, 2001 (age 25)
- Place of birth: Brigham City, Utah, United States
- Height: 5 ft 11 in (1.80 m)
- Position: Winger

Youth career
- 2015–2018: Real Salt Lake

Senior career*
Years	Team	Apps	(Gls)
2019–2020	Real Salt Lake	0	(0)
2019–2020	→ Real Monarchs (loan)	20	(2)
2021	Las Vegas Lights	24	(1)
2022	Sporting Kansas City II	20	(4)
2023	Real Monarchs	10	(0)

International career
2019–2020	Mexico U18	2	(1)
2020	Mexico U20	2	(0)
- * Club domestic league appearances and goals as of September 23, 2022

Julián Vázquez (born March 30, 2001) is a professional footballer who plays as a winger. Born in the United States, he represented the Mexico national under-20 team.

== Career ==
=== Professional ===
On October 7, 2018, Vázquez signed as a Homegrown Player for Real Salt Lake of Major League Soccer.

Vázquez made his professional debut on June 11, 2019, appearing as an 84th-minute substitute during a 3–0 loss to Los Angeles FC in the Lamar Hunt US Open Cup.

Vázquez was released by Salt Lake following their 2020 season.

In May 2021, Vázquez joined USL Championship side Las Vegas Lights.

Vázquez signed with MLS Next Pro side Sporting Kansas City II on February 18, 2022.

On May 14, 2023, Vázquez returned to Salt Lake City, joining Real Monarchs in the MLS Next Pro.

== Honors ==
Real Monarchs

- USL Championship Cup: 2019
