= Freddy Juarez =

American soccer player (born 1978)

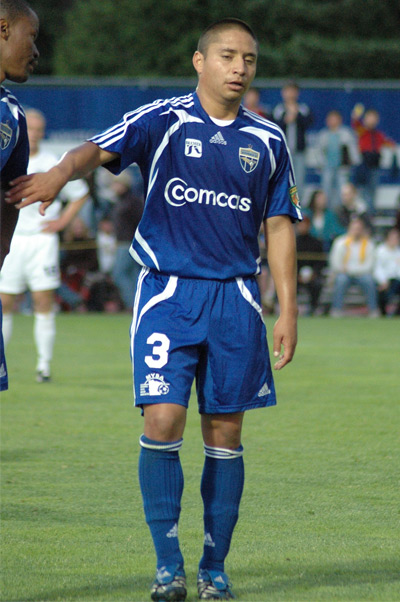

Personal information
- Full name: Frederico Juarez
- Date of birth: April 1, 1978 (age 48)
- Place of birth: Las Cruces, New Mexico, U.S.
- Height: 5 ft 6 in (1.67 m)
- Position: Defender

Senior career*
Years	Team	Apps	(Gls)
1998–2003	El Paso Patriots	133	(3)
1999–2000	Wichita Wings (indoor)	43	(11)
2004–2007	Minnesota Thunder	89	(3)

International career
2007	United States futsal		

Managerial career
- 2014–2016: Real Monarchs
- 2016–2019: Real Salt Lake (assistant)
- 2019–2021: Real Salt Lake
- 2021–: Seattle Sounders FC (assistant)
- * Club domestic league appearances and goals as of September 1, 2021

Freddy Juarez (born April 1, 1978) is an American soccer coach and player. He is currently an assistant coach with Seattle Sounders FC. Juarez most recently was the head coach of Real Salt Lake in Major League Soccer.

== Playing career ==
He began his professional career in 1998 with the El Paso Patriots. In 2004, he moved to the Minnesota Thunder for four seasons.

- 1999-2000 Wichita Wings NPSL (MISL)
- 2005 Invited into U.S. Men's National Team Camp
- 2007 U.S. Men's National Futsal Team

== Coaching career ==
During the off season, Freddy also coaches a premier club team in Las Cruces, New Mexico, where he is from. He has had much success coaching many teams from the New Mexico Striker F.C. His U19 team has won the New Mexico state championship six times and made it to the Far West Regional finals on more than one occasion. Coaching, Freddy has produced two professional players, brothers Edgar Castillo and Noel Castillo.

He served as an assistant coach for Real Salt Lake of Major League Soccer; he was elevated to interim head coach on August 11, 2019, after the firing of Mike Petke. In December 2019, he became the team's fifth head coach. On August 27, 2021, it was announced that Freddy had parted ways with immediate effect from Real Salt Lake for a new opportunity, with Pablo Mastroeni taking over as interim head coach.

On September 1, 2021, Seattle Sounders FC announced that Juarez had been hired as an assistant coach.

== Coaching record ==
As of August 22, 2021

Coaching record by team and tenure
Team	Nat	From	To	Record							
Team	Nat	From	To	G	W	D	L	GF	GA	GD	Win %
Real Monarchs	(United States)	December 23, 2014	December 6, 2016	60	18	14	28	64	84	−20	30.00
Real Salt Lake	(United States)	August 11, 2019	August 27, 2021	55	18	14	23	71	76	−5	32.73
Total				115	36	28	51	135	160	−25	31.30
