= Luis Arriaga =

American soccer player

Personal information
- Date of birth: January 26, 2001 (age 25)
- Place of birth: Santa Rosa, California, United States
- Height: 5 ft 6 in (1.68 m)
- Position: Midfielder

Youth career
- 2015–2019: Real Salt Lake

Senior career*
Years	Team	Apps	(Gls)
2019–2020	Real Salt Lake	2	(0)
2019–2020	Real Monarchs	24	(1)
2021–2023	North Carolina FC	81	(3)
- * Club domestic league appearances and goals as of October 16, 2023

Luis Arriaga (born January 26, 2001) is an American soccer player who currently plays as a midfielder.

== Professional career ==
Arriaga signed with Real Salt Lake on November 28, 2018, ahead of the 2019 season. He was released by Salt Lake following their 2020 season.

On March 11, 2021, Arriaga joined North Carolina FC in USL League One.

== Personal life ==
Born in the United States, Arriaga is of Mexican descent.
