= David Ochoa =

Professional footballer (born 2001)

Personal information
- Full name: David Ochoa
- Date of birth: 16 January 2001 (age 25)
- Place of birth: Oxnard, California, United States
- Height: 1.88 m (6 ft 2 in)
- Position: Goalkeeper

Youth career
- Real So Cal
- 2016: Guadalajara
- 2016–2018: Real Salt Lake

Senior career*
Years	Team	Apps	(Gls)
2018–2020	Real Monarchs	22	(0)
2020–2022	Real Salt Lake	26	(0)
2022	→ Real Monarchs (loan)	2	(0)
2022	D.C. United	9	(0)
2023	Atlético San Luis	1	(0)
2024	Los Angeles FC 2	20	(0)
2024–2025	Los Angeles FC	1	(0)
2025	→ Los Angeles FC 2 (loan)	1	(0)

International career^{‡}
2017	United States U16	2	(0)
2018	United States U18	4	(0)
2018–2019	United States U20	6	(0)
2021	United States U23	3	(0)
2021	Mexico U21	2	(0)
Medal record
Men's soccer
Representing United States
CONCACAF Nations League
Winner	2021 United States
CONCACAF U-20 Championship
Winner	2018 United States
- * Club domestic league appearances and goals as of 01:50, 4 January 2026 (UTC) ‡ National team caps and goals as of 11 October 2021

David Ochoa (born 16 January 2001) is a professional footballer who plays as a goalkeeper. Born in the United States, he represents Mexico internationally.

== Early life ==
Born in Oxnard, California to Mexican parents, Ochoa was introduced to the sport at a young age by his father, who also played as a goalkeeper. He played youth soccer with AC Brea, gaining national attention at the 2015 Dallas Cup youth tournament, where he helped his team win the U14 tournament. He drew attention from Mexican clubs Guadalajara and Monterrey and American clubs LA Galaxy and Real Salt Lake.

In April 2015, he earned his first US youth team call-up to play for the United States U14 team. He joined the Guadalajara youth academy, but was unable to play in competitive matches due to Mexican regulations requiring his parents to be present since he was a minor. During his time in Mexico, Ochoa also trained with the Mexico U16 team. Afterwards, he returned to the US, joining the Real Salt Lake Academy.

== Club career ==
Ochoa appeared for USL side Real Monarchs on 22 April 2018, in a 2–0 loss to Tampa Bay Rowdies, becoming the second-youngest goalkeeper ever to debut in USL.

On 8 August 2018, it was reported that Ochoa was training with Manchester United and had further trials planned with clubs from Spain and Germany.

Ochoa signed with Real Salt Lake on 28 November 2018, ahead of the 2019 season. Ochoa was loaned to the Real Monarchs for his first season and won the USL Championship, defeating Louisville City FC on 17 November 2019, in Louisville, Kentucky. In 2019, he played in the MLS Homegrown game at the 2019 MLS All-Star Game.

Ochoa made his Real Salt Lake debut on 8 November 2020, against Sporting Kansas City.

Ochoa was fined for kicking the ball into the stands during an 24 April 2021 match against Minnesota United FC. He recorded his first Major League Soccer shutout on 15 May 2021, against Nashville SC.

On 13 September 2024, Ochoa signed with Los Angeles FC from their reserve team. However, a season later Ochoa's contract option was declined.

== International career ==
=== United States ===
Ochoa was eligible to play for the United States or Mexico. Originally called up to the Mexico under-16s, Ochoa instead opted to play for the United States at multiple youth levels.

Ochoa has been capped at under-16, 18, and 20 levels for the U.S. and has also been a member of the under-17 residency program. On 25 August 2018, Ochoa made multiple penalty saves in the final of the 2018 Vaclav Jezek Tournament in helping the U.S. under-18s to winning the tournament.

On 1 December 2020, Ochoa was called up to the United States senior team by head coach Gregg Berhalter for the friendly against El Salvador on 9 December, but was replaced by San Jose Earthquakes goalkeeper JT Marcinkowski after Ochoa was diagnosed with a right quad strain.

Ochoa was named to the final 20-player United States under-23 roster for the 2020 CONCACAF Men's Olympic Qualifying Championship in March 2021. Ochoa started three games for the under-23 team during Olympic qualification. The United States failed to qualify for the 2020 Olympics after losing 2–1 to Honduras; Honduras scored their second goal after Ochoa played an errant pass that ricocheted off Luis Palma and into the United States goal.

On 24 May 2021, Ochoa was named to the United States' roster for the 2021 CONCACAF Nations League Finals.

=== Mexico ===
On 2 August 2021, Fox Sports reported that Ochoa had submitted and filed a one-time switch with FIFA in order to make a full move to the Mexico national football team.

On 9 October 2021, Ochoa made his Mexico U21 debut in a friendly match against the Romania U21 side.

On 21 April 2022, Ochoa received his first call-up to the senior national team by manager Gerardo Martino for a friendly match against Guatemala.

== Career statistics ==
=== Club ===
As of 29 July 2025

Club	Season	League			National cup		Continental		Playoffs		Other		Total	
Club	Season	Division	Apps	Goals	Apps	Goals	Apps	Goals	Apps	Goals	Apps	Goals	Apps	Goals
Real Monarchs	2018	United Soccer League	1	0	—		—		—		—		1	0
Real Monarchs	2019	USL Championship	16	0	—		—		4 (Note: Appearances in USL Championship Playoffs)	0	—		20	0
Real Monarchs	2020	USL Championship	5	0	—		—		—		—		5	0
Real Monarchs	Total		22	0	—		—		4	0	—		26	0
Real Salt Lake	2020	Major League Soccer	1	0	—		—		—		—		1	0
Real Salt Lake	2021	Major League Soccer	25	0	—		—		3 (Note: Appearances in MLS Cup Playoffs)	0	—		28	0
Real Salt Lake	2022	Major League Soccer	—		1	0	—		—		—		1	0
Real Salt Lake	Total		26	0	1	0	—		3	0	—		30	0
Real Monarchs (loan)	2022	MLS Next Pro	2	0	—		—		—		—		2	0
D.C. United	2022	Major League Soccer	9	0	—		—		—		—		9	0
Atlético San Luis	2022–23	Liga MX	1	0	—		—		—		—		1	0
Los Angeles FC 2	2024	MLS Next Pro	20	0	—		—		1 (Note: Appearance in MLS Next Pro Playoffs)	0	—		21	0
Los Angeles FC	2024	Major League Soccer	0	0	0	0	—		—		—		0	0
Los Angeles FC	2025	Major League Soccer	1	0	—		0	0	0	0	1 (Note: Appearance in Leagues Cup)	0	2	0
Los Angeles FC	Total		1	0	0	0	0	0	0	0	1	0	2	0
Los Angeles FC 2 (loan)	2025	MLS Next Pro	1	0	—		—		—		—		1	0
Career total			82	0	1	0	0	0	8	0	1	0	92	0

== Honours ==
Real Monarchs

- USL Cup: 2019

United States U20

- CONCACAF U-20 Championship: 2018

United States

- CONCACAF Nations League: 2019–20
