= 2026 Real Salt Lake season =

American soccer team season

Real Salt Lake
2026 season
- Head coach: Pablo Mastroeni
- Stadium: America First Field
- Major League Soccer: Conference: TBD; Overall: TBD
- MLS Cup Playoffs: TBD
- Leagues Cup: TBD
- Rocky Mountain Cup: TBD
Home colors	Away colors	Third colors

The 2026 Real Salt Lake season is the team's 22nd season in Major League Soccer, the top division of the American soccer pyramid. The team will also compete in the 2026 Leagues Cup, based on standings from the 2025 season. Real Salt Lake plays their home games at America First Field in the Salt Lake City suburb of Sandy, and are managed by Pablo Mastroeni in his fifth full season with the club.

On November 13, 2025, Major League Soccer announced a shift to a summer-to-spring season format, beginning in 2027. As such, this will be the club's final full season in the current format, which has been in place since the club's first season in 2005.

== Club ==
=== Roster ===
As of August 18, 2026

Note: Flags indicate national team as defined under FIFA eligibility rules; some limited exceptions apply. Players may hold more than one non-FIFA nationality.

No.	Pos.	Nation	Player
1	GK	BRA	Rafael Cabral
2	DF	USA	DeAndre Yedlin
3	DF	TTO	Kobi Henry
4	DF	DEN	Lukas Engel
6	MF	NED	Stijn Spierings
7	MF	ARG	Pablo Ruiz
8	MF	URU	Juan Manuel Sanabria
9	FW	GUI	Morgan Guilavogui
10	MF	USA	Diego Luna
11	FW	POL	Dominik Marczuk
12	FW	GEO	Saba Lobjanidze
14	MF	USA	Emeka Eneli
15	DF	USA	Justen Glad
17	FW	NGR	Victor Olatunji
19	FW	AUS	Ariath Piol
21	DF	COL	Juan José Arias (on loan from Atlético Nacional)
22	FW	ESP	Sergi Solans
23	MF	USA	Zach Booth (on loan from Excelsior)
24	GK	USA	Max Kerkvliet
26	DF	USA	Philip Quinton

No.	Pos.	Nation	Player
27	MF	USA	Griffin Dillon
29	DF	USA	Sam Junqua
30	MF	USA	Owen Anderson
31	GK	USA	Mason Stajduhar
34	MF	USA	Luca Moisa
36	FW	ESP	Jesús Barea
37	DF	USA	Luis Rivera
38	MF	CHI	Antonio Riquelme
39	MF	USA	Aiden Hezarkhani
40	MF	USA	Omar Marquez
41	DF	MEX	Juan Gio Villa
44	FW	USA	Chance Cowell
70	FW	BRA	Lineker Rodrigues
92	MF	GER	Noel Caliskan
98	DF	GRE	Alexandros Katranis
—	FW	CAN	Van Parker

=== Transfers ===
As of August 18, 2026

==== In ====
Player	Position	Previous Club	Fees/Notes	Date
(Trinidad and Tobago) Kobi Henry	DF	(France) Reims B	Permanent transfer following loan	December 18, 2025
(United States) Chance Cowell	FW	(United States) San Jose Earthquakes	GAM ($ amount TBD)	January 6, 2026
(United States) Griffin Dillon	MF	(United States) Real Monarchs	Homegrown player	January 9, 2026
(Chile) Antonio Riquelme	MF	(United States) Real Monarchs	Homegrown player	January 9, 2026
(Mexico) Diego Rocio	FW	(United States) Real Monarchs	Homegrown player	January 9, 2026
(Spain) Sergi Solans	FW	(United States) Oregon State Beavers	2026 MLS SuperDraft	January 15, 2026
(Denmark) Lukas Engel	DF	(England) Middlesbrough	Undisclosed	January 16, 2026
(Netherlands) Stijn Spierings	MF	(Denmark) Brøndby IF	Undisclosed	January 25, 2026
(Canada) Van Parker	FW	(United States) RSL Academy	Homegrown player	February 2, 2026
(Guinea) Morgan Guilavogui	FW	(France) RC Lens	Designated player	February 3, 2026
(Uruguay) Juan Manuel Sanabria	MF	(Mexico) Atlético San Luis	Undisclosed	February 10, 2026
(Georgia (country)) Saba Lobjanidze	MF	(United States) Atlanta United FC	$625k GAM + 2028 MLS SuperDraft pick	July 1, 2026
(Brazil) Lineker Rodrigues	FW	(United States) Real Monarchs	Undisclosed	August 10, 2026

==== Out ====
Player	Position	Next Club	Fees/Notes	Date
(Nigeria) William Agada	FW	(Spain) Real Zaragoza	Out of Contract	November 6, 2025
(Ghana) Forster Ajago	FW	(United States) Sacramento Republic FC	Option Declined	November 6, 2025
(Jamaica) Matthew Bell	MF	(Jamaica) Portmore United	Option Declined	November 6, 2025
(United States) Zackery Farnsworth	DF	(United States) Monterey Bay FC	Out of Contract	November 6, 2025
(Jamaica) Kevon Lambert	DF	(United States) Louisville City FC	Option Declined	November 6, 2025
(Scotland) Johnny Russell	FW	(Scotland) Dundee United	Option Declined	November 6, 2025
(United States) Tommy Silva	DF	(United States) Detroit City FC	Option Declined	November 6, 2025
(United States) Jude Wellings	MF		Option Declined	November 6, 2025
(United States) Zac MacMath	GK	Retired		November 7, 2025
(Colombia) Brayan Vera	DF	(Canada) CF Montreal	$1.5m GAM	December 10, 2025
(Paraguay) Braian Ojeda	MF	(United States) Orlando City SC	$1.8m GAM	January 2, 2026
(Portugal) Diogo Gonçalves	FW	(Turkey) Konyaspor	Buyout of guaranteed contract	January 28, 2026
(Jamaica) Javain Brown	DF	(United States) Lexington SC	Expiration of contract	March 4, 2026
(Colombia) Nelson Palacio	MF	(Canada) Toronto FC	$1.1 million	July 6, 2026
(United States) Marcos Zambrano	FW	(United States) New England Revolution	2029 MLS SuperDraft pick	July 16, 2026
(United States) Zavier Gozo	FW	(England) Crystal Palace F.C.	$15 million	August 18, 2026

=== Loans ===
==== In ====
Player	Position	Loaned From	Fees/Notes	Date
(United States) Zach Booth	MF	(Netherlands) Excelsior	Loan for full 2026 season	January 7, 2026
(Colombia) Juan José Arias	DF	(Colombia) Atlético Nacional	Loan until July 2026; option to purchase	February 9, 2026

==== Out ====
Player	Position	Loaned To	Fees/Notes	Date
(Colombia) Nelson Palacio	MF	(Switzerland) FC Zurich	Continuation of loan from 2025 season	July 10, 2025
(Mexico) Diego Rocío	FW	(Mexico) Club América	Loan for full 2026 season	February 5, 2026
(United States) Marcos Zambrano	FW	(United States) New England Revolution	Loan for full 2026 season	March 27, 2026
(United States) Tyler Wolff	FW	(United States) Sacramento Republic FC	Loan for full 2026 season	April 24, 2026
(United States) Mason Stajduhar	GK	(United States) Las Vegas Lights FC	Initially loaned for full 2026 season; recalled 7/2.	May 12, 2026

== Competitions ==
=== Preseason ===
January 22 Atlantic Cup	(United States) Real Salt Lake	2–1	(Denmark) Randers FC	Faro/Loulé, Portugal
TBD	Marczuk 31'; Wolff 46'		Seck 51'	Stadium: Estádio Algarve

January 26 Atlantic Cup	(United States) Real Salt Lake	2–1	(Denmark) Brøndby IF	Faro/Loulé, Portugal
TBD	Solans 9'; Katranis 81'		Slisz 23'	Stadium: Estádio Algarve

January 31 Atlantic Cup	(United States) Real Salt Lake	0–2	(United States) FC Dallas	Albufeira, Portugal
TBD			Musa 46'; Julio 90+'	Stadium: Estádio da Nora
Note: Match followed by additional 45-minute session, which ended RSL 1 (Wolff 35'), Dallas 1 (Louis 24')

February 6 Coachella Valley Invitational	(United States) Real Salt Lake	v	(United States) Orange County SC	Indio, California
TBD				Stadium: Empire Polo Club

February 13 Coachella Valley Invitational	(United States) Real Salt Lake	v	(United States) LA Galaxy	Indio, California
TBD				Stadium: Empire Polo Club

July 15 Friendly	Real Salt Lake (United States)	–	(England) Burnley	Sandy, Utah
8:00 PM MDT				Stadium: America First Field

=== MLS regular season ===
==== Matches ====
February 21 1	Vancouver Whitecaps FC	1–0	Real Salt Lake	Vancouver, British Columbia
5:30 p.m. MST	Sabbi (yellow card) 50'; Jackson 57'; Cubas (yellow card) 82'	Report	Gozo (yellow card) 33'; Junqua (yellow card) 75'; Katranis (yellow card) 76'	Stadium: BC Place; Attendance: 23,546; Referee: Drew Fischer

February 28 2	Real Salt Lake	2–1	Seattle Sounders FC	Sandy, Utah
5:30 p.m. MST	Quinton (yellow card) 6'; Hezarkhani 23'; Piol 47'; Gozo (yellow card) 60'; Marczuk (yellow card) 90+2'	Report	C. Roldan 62'	Stadium: America First Field; Attendance: 20,660; Referee: Tori Penso

March 7 3	Atlanta United FC	2–3	Real Salt Lake	Atlanta, Georgia
5:30 p.m. MST	Miranchuk 38', 74'; Sanchez (yellow card) 43'; Berrocal (yellow card) 45+6'	Report	Hezarkhani (yellow card) 17', (goal) 27'; Solans 23'; Gozo 40', (yellow card) 90+1'; Moisa (yellow card) 44'	Stadium: Mercedes-Benz Stadium; Attendance: 53,862; Referee: Jon Freemon

March 14 4	Real Salt Lake	2–1	Austin FC	Sandy, Utah
7:30 p.m. MDT	Svatok 24'; Guilavogui (yellow card) 39'; Spierings 88'	Report	Gallagher (yellow card) 7'; Bell 18'; Nelson (yellow card) 51'; Stuver (yellow card) 75'; Sánchez (yellow card) 90+3'	Stadium: America First Field; Attendance: 20,751; Referee: Elijio Arreguin

March 22 5	San Diego FC	2–2	Real Salt Lake	San Diego, California
5:00 p.m. MDT	Ingvartsen 27'; Dreyer 56'; McVey (yellow card) 85' (yellow-red card) 89'; Godoy (yellow card) 87'	Report	Solans 17'; Caliskan (yellow card) 40'; Dillon (yellow card) 49'; Olatunji 85'	Stadium: Snapdragon Stadium; Attendance: 24,141; Referee: Alexis Da Silva

April 4 6	Real Salt Lake	3–1	Sporting Kansas City	Sandy, Utah
2:30 p.m. MDT	Luna 4'; Solans 55'; Gozo 82'; Guilavogui (yellow card) 88'	Report	Joveljić 59'	Stadium: America First Field; Attendance: 20,290; Referee: Timothy Ford

April 18 7	Real Salt Lake	4–2	San Diego FC	Sandy, Utah
7:30 p.m. MDT	Luna 5'; Solans 6', 37'; Guilavogui 45' (yellow card) 51'	Report	Ingvartsen 14'; Duke (yellow card) 45+5'; Dreyer 66'	Stadium: America First Field; Attendance: 20,852; Referee: Ismail Elfath

April 22 8	Real Salt Lake	0–2	Inter Miami CF	Sandy, Utah
7:30 p.m. MDT	Yedlin (yellow card) 43'; Spierings (yellow card) 45+4'; Luna (yellow card) 58'	Report	Allen (yellow card) 42'; Micael (yellow card) 58'; Segovia (yellow card) 65'; De Paul 82'; Suárez 83'	Stadium: America First Field; Attendance: 21,512; Referee: Pierre-Luc Lauziere

April 26 9	LA Galaxy	2–1	Real Salt Lake	Carson, California
5:00 p.m. MDT	Reus 9', 85' (pen.); Haak (yellow card) 21'; Sanabria (yellow card) 42'; Cuevas (yellow card) 57'; Wynder (yellow card) 90+3'	Report	Marcinkowski 45+4' (o.g.); Caliskan (yellow card) 48'; Sanabria (yellow card) 55'; Luna (yellow card) 63'; Junqua (yellow card) 83'	Stadium: Dignity Health Sports Park; Attendance: 19,773; Referee: Victor Rivas

May 2 10	Real Salt Lake	2–0	Portland Timbers	Sandy, Utah
2:30 p.m. MDT	Gozo 10'; Luna 28'; Sanabria (yellow card) 85'	Report	Fory (yellow card) 60'; Smith (yellow card) 82'	Stadium: America First Field; Attendance: 20,614; Referee: Rosendo Mendoza

May 9 11	FC Dallas	3–1	Real Salt Lake	Frisco, Texas
6:30 p.m. MDT	Moreno 18'; Urhoghide (yellow card) 23'; Kaick 24'; Sarver 90+2', (yellow card) 90+4'	Report	Guilavogui (yellow card) 35'; Luna (yellow card) 45+1', (goal) 85'; Yedlin (yellow card) 82'	Stadium: Toyota Stadium; Attendance: 11,004; Referee: Joe Dickerson

May 13 12	Real Salt Lake	3–0	Houston Dynamo FC	Sandy, Utah
7:30 p.m. MDT	Holmes 49' (o.g.); Gozo 57', 64'	Report	Bouzat (yellow card) 45+4'	Stadium: America First Field; Attendance: 20,429; Referee: Jair Marrufo

May 16 13 (RMC)	Real Salt Lake	2–1	Colorado Rapids	Sandy, Utah
7:30 p.m. MDT	Gozo 36', (yellow card) 81'; Solans 68'; Yedlin (yellow card) 90+3'	Report	Frederick 7'; Ojediran (yellow card) 34'; Atencio (yellow card) 67'; Cannon (yellow card) 74'	Stadium: America First Field; Attendance: 21,424; Referee: Malik Badawi

May 23 14	Minnesota United FC	1–1	Real Salt Lake	Saint Paul, Minnesota
6:30 p.m. MDT	González 90+3'	Report	Booth 22'; Yedlin (yellow card) 29'; Caliskan (yellow card) 75'	Stadium: Allianz Field; Attendance: 19,838; Referee: Tori Penso

July 22 15	Los Angeles FC	3–1	Real Salt Lake	Los Angeles, California
8:30 p.m. MDT	Son Heung-min 11'; Bouanga 40'; Yedlin 69' (o.g.)	Report	Engel 86'	Stadium: BMO Stadium; Attendance: 22,097; Referee: Pierre-Luc Lauziere

July 25 16	Portland Timbers	2–1	Real Salt Lake	Portland, Oregon
8:30 p.m. MDT	Bassett (yellow card) 10'; Chará (yellow card) 41'; Mora 56', 67'	Report	Sanabria 18'; Guilavogui (red card) 31'; Solans (yellow card) 55'	Stadium: Providence Park; Attendance: 22,893; Referee: Elijio Arreguin

August 1 17	St. Louis City SC	1–1	Real Salt Lake	St. Louis, Missouri
6:30 p.m. MDT	Löwen (yellow card) 28'; Durkin (yellow card) 43'; Hartel 72'; Jeong Sang-bin (yellow card) 80'	Report	Booth (yellow card) 5'; Quintin (yellow card) 29'; Yedlin (yellow card) 40'; Solans 60'	Stadium: Energizer Park; Attendance: 22,423; Referee: Chris Penso

August 15 18	Real Salt Lake	1–1	Minnesota United FC	Sandy, Utah
7:30 p.m. MDT	Booth (yellow card) 13'; Rodrigues (yellow card) 56'; Solans 82'; Spierings (yellow card) 90+4'	Report	Díaz (yellow card) 32'; Pereyra 89'	Stadium: America First Field; Attendance: 20,137; Referee: Rubiel Vazquez

August 19 19	Real Salt Lake	3–4	FC Dallas	Sandy, Utah
7:30 p.m. MDT	Solans 38'; Guilavogui 50'; Luna (yellow card) 61', (goal) 64'; Yedlin (yellow card) 75'; Ruiz (yellow card) 90'	Report	Valiente 17'; Musa 20', 45'; Norris (yellow card) 38'; Moore (yellow card) 43'; Binyamin 90+1', (yellow card) 90+2'	Stadium: America First Field; Attendance: 20,632; Referee: Armando Villarreal

August 22 20	Orlando City SC	2–1	Real Salt Lake	Orlando, Florida
5:30 p.m. MDT	Griezmann 53', 81'; Atuesta (yellow card) 83'21	Report	Marczuk 36'; Rodrigues (yellow card) 43'; Katranis (yellow card) 45+4'	Stadium: Inter.co Stadium; Attendance: 17,612; Referee: Fotis Bazakos

August 29 21 (RMC)	Colorado Rapids	1–0	Real Salt Lake	Commerce City, Colorado
7:30 p.m. MDT	Ojediran (yellow card) 14'; Holding (yellow card) 49'; Cannon 58'; Navarro (yellow card) 90+2'	Report	Hezarkhani (yellow card) 53'; Guilavogui (yellow card) 61'; Caliskan (yellow card) 67'; Guske (yellow card) 79'; Arias (yellow card) 89'	Stadium: Dick's Sporting Goods Park; Attendance: 16,094; Referee: Rosendo Mendoza

September 5 22	Real Salt Lake	2–2	Los Angeles FC	Sandy, Utah
7:30 p.m. MDT	Lobjanidze 18'; Arias (yellow card) 30'; Moisa (yellow card) 60'; Caliskan 75'; Guske (yellow card) 77'	Report	Bouanga 14'; Son Heung-min 38'	Stadium: America First Field; Attendance: 21,078; Referee: Allen Chapman

September 9 23	Houston Dynamo FC	2–1	Real Salt Lake	Houston, Texas
6:30 p.m. MDT	Herrera (yellow card) 54'; Guilherme 57'; Bogusz 87'	Report	Luna (yellow card) 30'; Arias (yellow card) 33'; Guske (yellow card) 67'; Lobjanidze 76'; Quinton (yellow card) 90+5'	Stadium: Shell Energy Stadium; Attendance: 14,742; Referee: Ramy Touchan

September 12 24	Real Salt Lake	0–2	New York City FC	Sandy, Utah
7:30 p.m. MDT	Katranis (yellow card) 64'; Rodrigues (yellow card) 69'	Report	Fernández 41'; Luighi 61'; O'Toole (yellow card) 81'; Freese (yellow card) 90+8'	Stadium: America First Field; Attendance: 20,293; Referee: Abdou Ndiaye

September 19 25	Real Salt Lake	0–3	Vancouver Whitecaps FC	Sandy, Utah
7:30 p.m. MDT	Caliskan (yellow card) 59'; Guilavogui (yellow card) 72'	Report	White 9'; Müller 29'; Johnson (yellow card) 49'; Badwal (yellow card) 52'; Diaby 63', (yellow card) 81'; Blackmon (yellow card) 66'; Ocampo (yellow card) 90+1'	Stadium: America First Field; Attendance: 20,574; Referee: Guido Gonzales Jr.

September 23 26	Seattle Sounders FC	2–0	Real Salt Lake	Seattle, Washington
7:30 p.m. MDT	Kossa-Rienzi (yellow card) 10'; Arriola (yellow card) 41'; Musovski 48'; Brunell (yellow card) 55'; Rusnák 73'	Report	Henry (yellow card) 57'; Yedlin (yellow card) 87'	Stadium: Lumen Field; Attendance: 28,649; Referee: Joe Dickerson
Note: Rescheduled from April 12 due to Seattle's involvement in CONCACAF Champions Cup.

September 26 27	Real Salt Lake	3–0	New England Revolution	Sandy, Utah
7:30 p.m. MDT	Hezarkhani 2'; Guilavogui (yellow card) 46'; Solans 62', 80'; Cabral (yellow card) 75'	Report	Gil (yellow card) 46'; Wynder (yellow card) 61'	Stadium: America First Field; Attendance: 20,918; Referee: Ricardo Fierro

October 10 28	Philadelphia Union	2–1	Real Salt Lake	Chester, Pennsylvania
5:30 p.m. MDT	Jacques (yellow card) 3'; Westfield (yellow card) 23'; Damiani 31', (yellow card) 90'; Bueno (yellow card) 80'; Iloski 83'	Report	Yedlin (yellow card) 13'; Marczuk (yellow card) 62'; Lobjanidze 90+7'	Stadium: Subaru Park; Attendance: 18,886; Referee: Elijio Arreguin

October 14 29	Real Salt Lake	1–1	San Jose Earthquakes	Sandy, Utah
7:30 p.m. MDT	de Fougerolles 79'; Piol (yellow card) 90+2'	Report	Jasinski 90+5'	Stadium: America First Field; Attendance: 19,783; Referee: Sergii Demianchuk

October 17 30	Sporting Kansas City	1–3	Real Salt Lake	Kansas City, Kansas
6:30 p.m. MDT	Calheira 26'; Harris (yellow card) 74'; Bartlett (yellow card) 76'; Miller (yellow card) 90+2'	Report	Guilavogui 11', 61'; Solans 14'; de Fougerolles (yellow card) 45+1'; Sanabria (yellow card) 72'; Booth (yellow card) 90+1'; Spierings (yellow card) 90+1'	Stadium: Sporting Park; Attendance: 13,873; Referee: Alexis Da Silva

October 24 31	Real Salt Lake	3–0	St. Louis City SC	Sandy, Utah
7:30 p.m. MDT	Quinton (yellow card) 40'; Solans 41', 59'; Marczuk 52'; Sanabria (yellow card) 64'	Report	Santos (yellow card) 3'; Ostrák (yellow card) 30' (red card) 44'	Stadium: America First Field; Attendance: 20,614; Referee: Drew Fischer

October 28 32	Austin FC	1–2	Real Salt Lake	Austin, Texas
6:30 p.m. MDT	Alastuey 52', (yellow card) 77'; Las (yellow card) 61'	Report	Guilavogui (yellow card) 35', (goal) 61'; Lobjanidze 55'	Stadium: Q2 Stadium; Attendance: 20,738; Referee: Ricardo Montero

October 31 33	San Jose Earthquakes	2–1	Real Salt Lake	San Jose, California
3:00 p.m. MDT	Bouda 2'; Kikanović 17'; Roberts (yellow card) 46'; Tsakiris (yellow card) 60'	Report	Sanabria 23'; Quinton (yellow card) 63'; Katranis (yellow card) 90+6'	Stadium: PayPal Park; Attendance: 16,211; Referee: Lorenzo Hernandez

November 7 34	Real Salt Lake	2–1	LA Galaxy	Sandy, Utah
5:00 p.m. MST	Solans 10', (yellow card) 77'; Booth 13'; Henry (yellow card) 16'; Sanabria (yellow card) 45+3'	Report	de Fougerolles 40' (o.g.), (yellow card) 55'; Garcés (yellow card) 87'	Stadium: America First Field; Attendance: 20,738; Referee: Joe Dickerson

=== MLS Cup Playoffs ===
==== Wild card round ====
November 19 Wild card	Seattle Sounders FC	1–1 (2–4 p)	Real Salt Lake	Seattle, Washington
8:00 p.m. MST	Rusnák 36'; Kim Kee-hee (yellow card) 45+2'; C. Roldan (yellow card) 76'	Report	Marczuk (yellow card) 34'; Guilavogui (yellow card) 41', (goal) 63'	Stadium: Lumen Field; Attendance: 29,628; Referee: Jon Freemon
	Penalties
	Joveljić (penalty missed); Rusnák (penalty missed); Rothrock (penalty scored); Brunell (penalty scored)		(penalty scored) Solans; (penalty scored) Engel; (penalty scored) Hezarkhani; (penalty scored) Quinton

==== Round one ====
November 22 Game 1	Vancouver Whitecaps FC	v	Real Salt Lake	Vancouver, British Columbia
7:30 p.m. MST				Stadium: BC Place

November 27 Game 2	Real Salt Lake	v	Vancouver Whitecaps FC	Sandy, Utah
8:00 p.m. MST				Stadium: America First Field

December 2 Game 3	Vancouver Whitecaps FC	v	Real Salt Lake	Vancouver, British Columbia
TBA				Stadium: BC Place

==== Standings ====
===== Western Conference table =====
MLS Western Conference table (2026)
Pos	Team	Pld	W	L	T	GF	GA	GD	Pts	Qualification
1	Vancouver Whitecaps FC	34	19	8	7	74	34	+40	64	Qualification for round one and the CONCACAF Champions Cup round one
2	FC Dallas	34	16	8	10	62	51	+11	58	Qualification for round one
3	St. Louis City SC	34	15	10	9	59	48	+11	54	Qualification for round one
4	San Jose Earthquakes	34	14	10	10	57	51	+6	52	Qualification for round one
5	Houston Dynamo FC	34	14	11	9	43	43	0	51	Qualification for round one
6	Los Angeles FC	34	12	11	11	52	40	+12	47	Qualification for round one
7	Portland Timbers	34	13	14	7	62	61	+1	46	Qualification for round one
8	Seattle Sounders FC	34	12	12	10	44	46	−2	46	Qualification for the wild card round
9	Real Salt Lake	34	13	15	6	53	52	+1	45	Qualification for the wild card round
10	Minnesota United FC	34	11	12	11	56	58	−2	44	
11	LA Galaxy	34	11	12	11	50	57	−7	44	
12	Colorado Rapids	34	12	15	7	47	50	−3	43	
13	San Diego FC	34	9	14	11	57	63	−6	38	
14	Austin FC	34	8	16	10	42	65	−23	34	
15	Sporting Kansas City	34	7	22	5	40	81	−41	26	

Source: MLS
Rules for classification: 1) points; 2) total wins; 3) total goal differential; 4) total goals scored; 5) fewer disciplinary points; 6) away goal differential; 7) away goals scored; 8) home goals differential; 9) home goals scored; 10) coin toss (2 clubs tied) or drawing of lots (≥3 clubs tied)

===== Overall table =====
Overall MLS standings table
Pos	Team	Pld	W	L	T	GF	GA	GD	Pts
16	Seattle Sounders FC	34	12	12	10	44	46	−2	46
17	FC Cincinnati	34	12	12	10	67	75	−8	46
18	Real Salt Lake	34	13	15	6	53	52	+1	45
19	Minnesota United FC	34	11	12	11	56	58	−2	44
20	LA Galaxy	34	11	12	11	50	57	−7	44

Source: MLS
Rules for classification: 1) points; 2) total wins; 3) total goal differential; 4) total goals scored; 5) fewer disciplinary points; 6) away goal differential; 7) away goals scored; 8) home goals differential; 9) home goals scored; 10) coin toss (2 clubs tied) or drawing of lots (≥3 clubs tied)

=== Leagues Cup ===
Real Salt Lake entered the 2026 Leagues Cup, based on league position from the previous season.

August 4 Group Stage	UANL (Mexico)	1–1 (6–5 p)	(United States) Real Salt Lake	Sandy, Utah
8:00 p.m. MDT	Brunetta 6'; Garza (yellow card) 50'; Lainez (yellow card) 78'	Report	Ruiz 16'; Engel (yellow card) 86'	Stadium: America First Field; Attendance: 16,155; Referee: Selvin Brown
	Penalties
	Brunetta (penalty scored); Gorriarán (penalty scored); Aguirre (penalty scored); Araújo (penalty scored); Franco (penalty scored); Garza (penalty scored)		(penalty scored) Sanabria; (penalty scored) Solans; (penalty scored) Luna; (penalty scored) Caliskan; (penalty scored) Engel; (penalty missed) Booth

August 8 Group Stage	Real Salt Lake (United States)	4–0	(Mexico) Atlante	Sandy, Utah
8:00 p.m. MDT	Solans 17'; Booth 50'; Engel 54'; Luna (yellow card) 79'; Katranis (yellow card) 85'; Ruiz 90'	Report	Pizzuto (yellow card) 36'; Jiménez (yellow card) 79'	Stadium: America First Field; Attendance: 19,510; Referee: Lizzet García
Note: Game was originally scheduled against Mazatlán until the team was disbanded and replaced by Atlante.

August 11 Group Stage	Real Salt Lake (United States)	3–0	(Mexico) Juárez	Sandy, Utah
7:30 p.m. MDT	Guilavogui 29' (pen.); Ruiz (yellow card) 40'; Solans 53', (yellow card) 74'; Rodrigues 68'; Yedlin (yellow card) 74'	Report	Torres (yellow card) 33'; Murillo (yellow card) 38'; Sepúlveda (yellow card) 80'	Stadium: America First Field; Attendance: 14,099; Referee: César Arturo Ramos

August 25 Quarterfinals	León (Mexico)	3–0	(United States) Real Salt Lake	Commerce City, Colorado
8:30 p.m. MDT	Cambindo 21', 72', (yellow card) 72'; Vegas 66'	Report	Yedlin (yellow card) 9'; Engel (yellow card) 78'	Stadium: Dick's Sporting Goods Park; Attendance: 7,150; Referee: Steven Madrigal

== Statistics ==
=== Squad appearances ===
As of August 18, 2026

No	Pos	Nat	Player	Total		MLS Regular Season		Leagues Cup		MLS Cup Playoffs	
No	Pos	Nat	Player	Apps	Starts	Apps	Starts	Apps	Starts	Apps	Starts
Goalkeepers
1	GK	(Brazil)	Rafael Cabral	21	21	18	18	3	3	0	0
24	GK	(United States)	Max Kerkvliet	0	0	0	0	0	0	0	0
31	GK	(United States)	Mason Stajduhar	0	0	0	0	0	0	0	0
Defenders
2	DF	(United States)	DeAndre Yedlin	14	13	12	11	2	2	0	0
3	DF	(Trinidad and Tobago)	Kobi Henry	0	0	0	0	0	0	0	0
4	DF	(Denmark)	Lukas Engel	13	13	11	11	2	2	0	0
15	DF	(United States)	Justen Glad	12	12	12	12	0	0	0	0
21	DF	(Colombia)	Juan José Arias	5	3	2	1	3	2	0	0
26	DF	(United States)	Philip Quinton	18	14	15	12	3	2	0	0
29	DF	(United States)	Sam Junqua	15	8	14	7	1	1	0	0
37	DF	(United States)	Luis Rivera	0	0	0	0	0	0	0	0
41	DF	(Mexico)	Juan Gio Villa	0	0	0	0	0	0	0	0
98	DF	(Greece)	Alexandros Katranis	8	5	7	4	1	1	0	0
Midfielders
6	MF	(Netherlands)	Stijn Spierings	18	15	15	12	3	3	0	0
7	MF	(Argentina)	Pablo Ruiz	7	2	4	0	3	2	0	0
8	MF	(Uruguay)	Juan Manuel Sanabria	18	16	15	14	3	2	0	0
10	MF	(United States)	Diego Luna	16	12	13	10	3	2	0	0
12	MF	(Georgia (country))	Saba Lobjanidze	6	1	4	0	2	1	0	0
14	MF	(United States)	Emeka Eneli	0	0	0	0	0	0	0	0
23	MF	(United States)	Zach Booth	14	8	11	6	3	2	0	0
27	MF	(United States)	Griffin Dillon	10	4	10	3	0	0	0	0
30	MF	(United States)	Owen Anderson	0	0	0	0	0	0	0	0
34	MF	(United States)	Luca Moisa	3	3	3	3	0	0	0	0
38	MF	(Chile)	Antonio Riquelme	0	0	0	0	0	0	0	0
39	MF	(United States)	Aiden Hezarkhani	17	8	15	8	2	0	0	0
40	MF	(United States)	Omar Marquez	0	0	0	0	0	0	0	0
92	MF	(Germany)	Noel Caliskan	21	18	18	17	3	1	0	0
Forwards
9	FW	(Guinea)	Morgan Guilavogui	17	14	14	11	3	3	0	0
11	FW	(Poland)	Dominik Marczuk	11	2	10	1	1	1	0	0
17	FW	(Nigeria)	Victor Olatunji	17	3	15	2	2	1	0	0
19	FW	(Australia)	Ariath Piol	2	2	2	2	0	0	0	0
22	FW	(Spain)	Sergi Solans	21	15	18	14	3	1	0	0
36	FW	(Spain)	Jesús Barea	3	0	3	0	0	0	0	0
44	FW	(United States)	Chance Cowell	0	0	0	0	0	0	0	0
70	FW	(Brazil)	Lineker Rodrigues	5	3	3	2	2	1	0	0
	FW	(Canada)	Van Parker	0	0	0	0	0	0	0	0
Other players (Departed during season, short-term loan, etc.)
	FW	(United States)	Zavier Gozo	16	16	16	16	0	0	0	0
	MF	(Colombia)	Nelson Palacio	0	0	0	0	0	0	0	0
	FW	(Mexico)	Diego Rocio	0	0	0	0	0	0	0	0
	FW	(United States)	Tyler Wolff	0	0	0	0	0	0	0	0
	FW	(United States)	Marcos Zambrano	0	0	0	0	0	0	0	0

=== Goals ===
As of August 18, 2026

Goals
Rank	Player	Nation	Total	MLS Regular Season	Leagues Cup	MLS Cup Playoffs
1	Sergi Solans	(Spain)	10	8	2	
2	Zavier Gozo	(United States)	6	6		
3	Diego Luna	(United States)	4	4		
4	Zach Booth	(United States)	2	1	1	
4	Lukas Engel	(Denmark)	2	1	1	
4	Morgan Guilavogui	(Guinea)	2	1	1	
4	Aiden Hezarkhani	(United States)	2	2		
4	Pablo Ruiz	(United States)	2		2	
9	Victor Olatunji	(Nigeria)	1	1		
9	Ariath Piol	(Australia)	1	1		
9	Lineker Rodrigues	(Brazil)	1		1	
9	Juan Manuel Sanabria	(Uruguay)	1	1		
9	Stijn Spierings	(Netherlands)	1	1		

=== Assists ===
As of August 18, 2026

Assists
Rank	Player	Nation	Total	MLS Regular Season	Leagues Cup	MLS Cup Playoffs
1	Morgan Guilavogui	(Guinea)	8	6	2	
2	Diego Luna	(United States)	6	4	2	
2	Juan Manuel Sanabria	(Uruguay)	6	6		
4	Noel Caliskan	(Germany)	5	4	1	
4	Zavier Gozo	(United States)	5	5		
6	Justen Glad	(United States)	3	3		
6	Sergi Solans	(Spain)	3	3		
6	DeAndre Yedlin	(United States)	3	2	1	
9	Saba Lobjanidze	(Georgia (country))	2	2		
9	Philip Quinton	(United States)	2	2		
9	Stijn Spierings	(Netherlands)	2	2		
12	Rafael Cabral	(Brazil)	1	1		
12	Sam Junqua	(United States)	1	1		
12	Alexandros Katranis	(Greece)	1	1		
12	Luca Moisa	(United States)	1	1		

=== Clean Sheets ===
As of August 18, 2026

Shutouts
Rank	Player	Nation	Total	MLS Regular Season	Leagues Cup	MLS Cup Playoffs
1	Rafael Cabral	(Brazil)	4	2	2	
