= 2024 Real Salt Lake season =

American soccer team season

Real Salt Lake
2024 season
- Head coach: Pablo Mastroeni
- Stadium: America First Field
- Major League Soccer: Conference: 3rd Overall: 6th
- MLS Cup Playoffs: Round one
- Leagues Cup: Group stage
- U.S. Open Cup: Round of 32
- Rocky Mountain Cup: Lost
- Top goalscorer: League: All: Chicho Arango (17 goals)
- Highest home attendance: 21,570 vs LAG
- Lowest home attendance: 19,346 vs MIN
- Average home league attendance: 20,048
- Biggest win: 4 goals (2 occasions): RSL 5-1 ATX; CHI 0-4 RSL
- Biggest defeat: 3 goals (2 occasions): PDX 3-0 RSL; HOU 4-1 RSL
Home colors	Away colors

The 2024 Real Salt Lake season was the team's 20th season in Major League Soccer, the top division of the American soccer pyramid. The team also competed in both the 2024 U.S. Open Cup and 2024 Leagues Cup. Real Salt Lake played their home games at America First Field in the Salt Lake City suburb of Sandy, and were managed by Pablo Mastroeni in his third full season with the club.

The season ended with the club recording its highest-ever single-season points total (59) and a 3rd place finish in the Western Conference, ensuring qualification to the 2024 MLS Cup Playoffs. The club would lose in the first round to Minnesota United FC.

For his performances in this season, midfielder Diego Luna would be named as the MLS Young Player of the Year.

== Club ==
=== Roster ===
As of April 19, 2024

No.	Name	Nationality	Positions	Date of birth (age)	Signed from	Seasons with club (year signed)
2	Andrew Brody	United States	DF	May 3, 1995 (age 30)	(United States) Real Monarchs	4 (2021)
3	Bryan Oviedo	Costa Rica	DF	February 18, 1990 (age 36)	(Denmark) FC Copenhagen	3 (2022)
4	Brayan Vera	Colombia	DF	January 15, 1999 (age 27)	(Colombia) América de Cali	2 (2023)
6	Braian Ojeda	Paraguay	MF	June 27, 2000 (age 25)	(England) Nottingham Forest	3 (2022)
7	Pablo Ruíz	Argentina	MF	December 20, 1998 (age 27)	(Chile) San Luis	7 (2018)
8	Diego Luna	United States	MF	September 3, 2003 (age 22)	(United States) El Paso Locomotive	3 (2022)
9	Chicho Arango (DP)	Colombia	FW	March 9, 1995 (age 30)	(Mexico) C.F. Pachuca	2 (2023)
11	Andrés Gómez	Colombia	FW	September 12, 2002 (age 23)	(Colombia) Millonarios F.C.	2 (2023)
12	Matthew Bell	Jamaica	MF	August 7, 2002 (age 23)	(United States) Marshall Thundering Herd	1 (2024)
13	Nelson Palacio	Colombia	MF	June 16, 2001 (age 24)	(Colombia) Atlético Nacional	2 (2023)
14	Emeka Eneli	United States	DF	October 18, 1999 (age 26)	(United States) Cornell Big Red	2 (2023)
15	Justen Glad (HGP)	United States	DF	February 28, 1997 (age 29)	(United States) Real Salt Lake Academy (HGP)	11 (2014)
16	Maikel Chang	Cuba	MF	April 18, 1991 (age 34)	(United States) Real Monarchs	5 (2020)
17	Fidel Barajas	Mexico	MF	April 6, 2006 (age 19)	(United States) Charleston Battery	1 (2024)
18	Zac MacMath	United States	GK	August 7, 1991 (age 34)	(Canada) Vancouver Whitecaps FC	5 (2020)
19	Bode Hidalgo	United States	FW	February 22, 2002 (age 24)	(United States) Real Monarchs	4 (2021)
20	Erik Holt (HGP)	United States	DF	September 6, 1996 (age 29)	(United States) Real Salt Lake Academy (HGP)	6 (2019)
21	Axel Kei (HGP)	Ivory Coast	FW	December 30, 2007 (age 18)	(United States) Real Salt Lake Academy (HGP)	3 (2022)
23	Ilijah Paul (GA)	United States	FW	July 26, 2002 (age 23)	(United States) Washington Huskies	2 (2023)
24	Tomas Gomez	United States	GK	May 20, 1993 (age 32)	(United States) Real Monarchs	3 (2022)
25	Matt Crooks	England	MF	January 20, 1994 (age 32)	(England) Middlesbrough F.C.	1 (2024)
26	Philip Quinton	United States	DF	November 16, 1999 (age 26)	(United States) Columbus Crew	1 (2024)
27	Bertin Jacquesson (GA)	France	FW	November 30, 2001 (age 24)	(United States) Pittsburgh Panthers	2 (2023)
29	Anderson Julio	Ecuador	FW	May 31, 1996 (age 29)	(Mexico) Atlético San Luis	4 (2021)
30	Marcelo Silva	Uruguay	DF	March 21, 1989 (age 36)	(Spain) Real Zaragoza	8 (2017)
32	Zack Farnsworth (HGP)	United States	DF	July 13, 2002 (age 23)	(United States) Real Salt Lake Academy (HGP)	4 (2021)
33	Tommy Silva (HGP)	United States	DF	February 21, 2002 (age 24)	(United States) UCLA Bruins (HGP)	1 (2024)
34	Luca Moisa (HGP)	United States	MF	April 20, 2008 (age 17)	(United States) Real Monarchs (HGP)	1 (2024)
35	Gavin Beavers (HGP)	United States	GK	April 29, 2005 (age 20)	(United States) Real Monarchs (HGP)	3 (2022)
36	Kevin Bonilla	United States	DF	September 20, 2001 (age 24)	(United States) Portland Pilots	1 (2024)
37	Luis Rivera (HGP)	United States	DF	December 1, 2007 (age 18)	(United States) Real Monarchs	2 (2023)
38	Jude Wellings (HGP)	United States	MF	April 26, 2006 (age 19)	(United States) Real Monarchs (HGP)	3 (2022)
34	Zavier Gozo (HGP)	United States	FW	March 27, 2007 (age 18)	(United States) Real Monarchs (HGP)	1 (2024)
98	Alexandros Katranis	Greece	DF	May 4, 1998 (age 27)	(Poland) Piast Gliwice	1 (2024)

=== Transfers ===
As of April 19, 2024'

==== In ====
Player	Position	Previous Club	Fees/Notes	Date	Ref.
(United States) Tommy Silva	DF	(United States) UCLA Bruins	Homegrown player	January 5, 2024	
(United States) Kevin Bonilla	DF	(United States) Portland Pilots	2024 MLS SuperDraft	January 9, 2024	
(Mexico) Fidel Barajas	MF	(United States) Charleston Battery	Undisclosed	January 11, 2024	
(Greece) Alexandros Katranis	DF	(Poland) Piast Gliwice	Undisclosed	February 2, 2024	
(England) Matt Crooks	MF	(England) Middlesbrough F.C.	Undisclosed	February 12, 2024	
(Jamaica) Matthew Bell	MF	(United States) Marshall Thundering Herd	2024 MLS SuperDraft	February 19, 2024	
(United States) Zavier Gozo	FW	(United States) Real Monarchs	Homegrown player	February 20, 2024	
(United States) Luca Moisa	MF	(United States) Real Monarchs	Homegrown player	February 20, 2024	
(United States) Philip Quinton	DF	(United States) Columbus Crew	$200,000 GAM	April 19, 2024	
(Germany) Noel Caliskan	MF	(United States) Real Monarchs		June 22, 2024	
(United States) Benji Michel	FW	(Portugal) Arouca		July 19, 2024	
(Australia) Lachlan Brook	FW	(Australia) Western Sydney Wanderers		July 23, 2024	
(Jamaica) Javain Brown	DF	(Canada) Vancouver Whitecaps FC		July 31, 2024	
(Portugal) Diogo Goncalves	MF	(Denmark) F.C. Copenhagen		August 9, 2024	
(Poland) Dominik Marczuk	MF	(Poland) Jagiellonia Bialystok		August 14, 2024	

==== Out ====
Player	Position	Next Club	Fees/Notes	Date
(United States) Julio Benitez	MF		Option Declined	November 17, 2023
(United States) Scott Caldwell	MF	Retired		November 17, 2023
(Croatia) Damir Kreilach	MF	(Canada) Vancouver Whitecaps FC	Option Declined	November 17, 2023
(United States) Danny Musovski	FW	(United States) Seattle Sounders FC	Contract expired	November 17, 2023
(Germany) Jasper Löffelsend	MF	(United States) Colorado Rapids	$100K GAM, int'l spot, SuperDraft pick	January 10, 2024
(Venezuela) Jefferson Savarino	FW	(Brazil) Botafogo	Undisclosed	January 13, 2024
(Mexico) Fidel Barajas	FW	(Mexico) Guadalajara	Undisclosed	July 2, 2024
(Costa Rica) Bryan Oviedo	DF	(Costa Rica) Alajuelense	Waived	August 15, 2024
(Colombia) Andrés Gómez	FW	(France) Stade Rennais		August 17, 2024

=== Loans ===
==== In ====
Player	Position	Loaned From	Fees/Notes	Date
(Germany) Noel Caliskan	MF	(United States) Real Monarchs	Short-term call-up	February 21, 2024

==== Out ====
Player	Position	Loaned To	Fees/Notes	Date
(Guatemala) Rubio Rubín	FW	(Mexico) Querétaro		January 14, 2024
(Jamaica) Kevon Lambert	MF	(United States) San Antonio FC	Loaned for full 2024 season	February 16, 2024
(Haiti) Delentz Pierre	DF	(United States) Colorado Springs Switchbacks	Loaned for full 2024 season	February 16, 2024

== Competitions ==
=== Preseason ===
February 3 Atlantic Cup	Real Salt Lake	1–2	Brøndby IF	Faro/Loulé, Portugal
9:00 am MDT	Julio 16'	Report	Vallys 35'; Suzuki 41'	Stadium: Estádio Algarve

February 6 Atlantic Cup	Real Salt Lake	1–0	Fredrikstad FK	Lagos, Portugal
12 pm MDT	Julio 36'	Report		Stadium: Estádio Municipal de Lagos

February 9 Atlantic Cup	Real Salt Lake	3–0	KÍ Klaksvik	Parchal, Portugal
6:00 am MDT	Julio 38'; Ruiz 52'; Barajas 80'	Report		Stadium: Estádio Municipal Bela Vista

February 14 Friendly	Real Salt Lake	1–1	Toronto FC	Santa Barbara, California
	Goal	Report	Bernardeschi

=== MLS regular season ===
==== Matches ====
February 21 1	Inter Miami CF	2–0	Real Salt Lake	Fort Lauderdale, Florida
6 pm MT	Taylor 39'; D. Gómez (yellow card) 68', (goal) 83'	Report	Ruiz (yellow card) 15'	Stadium: Chase Stadium; Attendance: 21,137; Referee: Cristian Campo Hernandez

February 24 2	St. Louis City SC	1–1	Real Salt Lake	St. Louis, Missouri
6:30 pm MT	Pompeu (yellow card) 24'; Adeniran 78'	Report	Arango 74'	Stadium: CityPark; Attendance: 22,500; Referee: Lorenzo Hernandez

March 2 3	Real Salt Lake	3–0	Los Angeles FC	Sandy, Utah
2 pm MT	Gómez 18', 41'; Ojeda (yellow card) 37' (yellow-red card) 86'; Arango 45+5', (yellow card) 59'	Report	Atuesta (yellow card) 35'; Murillo (yellow card) 50'; Bogusz (yellow card) 68'	Stadium: America First Field; Attendance: 19,509; Referee: Aleksandar Zhelyazkov

March 9 4 RMC	Real Salt Lake	1–2	Colorado Rapids	Sandy, Utah
7:30 pm MT	Eneli 22'; Hidalgo (yellow card) 40'; Vera (yellow card) 87'; Luna (yellow card) 90+'	Report	Navarro 43' (pen.); Löffelsend (yellow card) 58'; Bassett 70'	Stadium: America First Field; Attendance: 20,147; Referee: Atahan Yara

March 23 5	Vancouver Whitecaps FC	1–2	Real Salt Lake	Vancouver, British Columbia
5:30 pm MT	Kreilach 33'	Report	Katranis (yellow card) 47', (goal) 76'; Julio 70'; Vera (yellow card) 90+7'; MacMath (yellow card) 90+10'	Stadium: BC Place; Attendance: 22,178; Referee: Chris Grabas

March 30 6	Real Salt Lake	3–1	St. Louis City SC	Sandy, Utah
7:30 pm MT	Hidalgo (yellow card) 28'; Arango 70', 84', 90+1'	Report	Vassilev 3'; Markanich (yellow card) 30'; Parker (yellow card) 90+9'	Stadium: America First Field; Attendance: 19,357; Referee: Drew Fischer

April 6 7	Minnesota United FC	1–1	Real Salt Lake	St. Paul, Minnesota
6:30 pm MT	Rosales (yellow card) 40' (red card) 89'; Trapp (yellow card) 45+1'; Oluwaseyi 87'	Report	Arango 24'; Katranis (yellow card) 64'; MacMath (yellow card) 82'; Eneli (yellow card) 90+2'	Stadium: Allianz Field; Attendance: 19,568; Referee: Mark Allatin

April 13 8	Real Salt Lake	0–0	Columbus Crew	Sandy, Utah
7:30 pm MT	Crooks (yellow card) 13'; Ojeda (yellow card) 45+3'; Eneli (yellow card) 46'; Vera (yellow card) 57'; Arango (yellow card) 65'; Katranis (yellow card) 90+1'	Report	Quinton (yellow card) 22'; Arfsten (yellow card) 45+6'; Habroune (yellow card) 59'	Stadium: America First Field; Attendance: 20,033; Referee: Ramy Touchan

April 20 9	Chicago Fire FC	0–4	Real Salt Lake	Chicago, Illinois
6:30 pm MT	Acosta (yellow card) 15'	Report	Gómez 24', (yellow card) 31'; Arango 33', 37'; Luna 90+3'	Stadium: Soldier Field; Attendance: 14,247; Referee: Marcos de Oliveira

April 27 10	Philadelphia Union	1–2	Real Salt Lake	Chester, Pennsylvania
5:30 pm MT	Gazdag 50'; Glesnes (yellow card) 57'; Carranza (yellow card) 78'; Bedoya (yellow card) 90+8'	Report	Gómez 34', (yellow card) 75'; Arango (yellow card) 39'; Katranis (yellow card) 49', (goal) 89'; Vera (yellow card) 57'; Crooks (yellow card) 59'	Stadium: Subaru Park; Attendance: 19,048; Referee: Malik Badawi

May 4 11	Real Salt Lake	1–0	Sporting Kansas City	Sandy, Utah
7:30 pm MT	Eneli (yellow card) 14'; Vera (yellow card) 47'; Arango 81', (yellow card) 90'	Report	Rodríguez (yellow card) 90+4'	Stadium: America First Field; Attendance: 20,001; Referee: Timothy Ford

May 11 12	LA Galaxy	2–2	Real Salt Lake	Carson, California
8:30 pm MT	Aude (yellow card) 18'; Pec 54'; Berry 90+4'	Report	Arango 20', 40'; Crooks (yellow card) 23'	Stadium: Dignity Health Sports Park; Attendance: 25,220; Referee: Rubiel Vazquez

May 15 13	Real Salt Lake	2–0	Seattle Sounders FC	Sandy, Utah
7:30 pm MT	A. Gómez 27', (yellow card) 86'; Luna 58'; Barajas (yellow card) 90+2'	Report	Baker (yellow card) 55'; C. Roldan (yellow card) 85'	Stadium: America First Field; Attendance: 19,268; Referee: Ismir Pekmic

May 18 14 RMC	Real Salt Lake	5–3	Colorado Rapids	Sandy, Utah
7:30 pm MT	Arango 23', 85'; A. Gómez 40', 88', (yellow card) 90'; Crooks (yellow card) 51'; Vera (yellow card) 65'; Eneli (yellow card) 79'; Julio 90+6'	Report	Bassett 5'; Navarro 19'; Steffen (yellow card) 32'; Mihailovic 56'; Yapi (yellow card) 90+9'	Stadium: America First Field; Attendance: 20,213; Referee: Jon Freemon

May 25 15	FC Dallas	3–3	Real Salt Lake	Frisco, Texas
6:30 pm MT	Fraser (yellow card) 38'; Illarramendi 45+4'; Delgado 57'; Arriola 59'; Paes (yellow card) 80'; Norris (yellow card) 81'; Ibeagha (yellow card) 87'	Report	Luna 61'; Julio 73'; Palacio 90+8'	Stadium: Toyota Stadium; Attendance: 19,096; Referee: Abdou Ndiaye

May 29 16	Seattle Sounders FC	1–1	Real Salt Lake	Seattle, Washington
8:30 pm MT	Rusnák 68'; Vargas (yellow card) 87'; Baker-Whiting (yellow card) 90+4'	Report	Oviedo (yellow card) 67'; Crooks (yellow card) 75'; A. Gómez 90+9'	Stadium: Lumen Field; Attendance: 29,244; Referee: Sergii Boiko

June 1 17	Real Salt Lake	5–1	Austin FC	Sandy, Utah
7:30 pm MT	Arango 16', 45+5', 71'; Julio 24', 31'; Palacio (yellow card) 83'; Vera (yellow card) 84'	Report	Pereira (yellow card) 45+1'; Ring (yellow card) 54', (goal) 90+2'; Biro (yellow card) 82'	Stadium: America First Field; Attendance: 21,078; Referee: Alexis Da Silva

June 15 18	CF Montréal	0–0	Real Salt Lake	Montreal, Quebec
5:30 pm MT	Yankov (yellow card) 22'; Campbell (yellow card) 49'; Saliba (yellow card) 50'; Cóccaro (yellow card) 63'; Sosa (yellow card) 74'	Report	Luna (yellow card) 72'	Stadium: Saputo Stadium; Attendance: 19,619; Referee: Filip Dujic

June 19 19	Sporting Kansas City	3–4	Real Salt Lake	Kansas City, Kansas
6:30 pm MT	Afrifa 28'; Agada 70', 90+5'; Bassong (yellow card) 90+2'	Report	A. Gómez 14', 51'; Julio 33'; Vera (yellow card) 77'; Crooks 84'	Stadium: Children's Mercy Park; Attendance: 16,414; Referee: Mark Allatin

June 22 20	Real Salt Lake	0–1	LA Galaxy	Sandy, Utah
7:30 pm MT	Oviedo (yellow card) 55'; Gómez (yellow card) 78'	Report	Yamane (yellow card) 59'; Pec 74'	Stadium: America First Field; Attendance: 21,570; Referee: Jair Marrufo

July 3 21	Real Salt Lake	3–2	Houston Dynamo FC	Sandy, Utah
7:30 pm MT	Gómez 22'; Luna 42'; Ojeda 67', (yellow card) 77'; Eneli (yellow card) 90+2'	Report	Blessing (yellow card) 5'; Aliyu 8'; Brody 55' (o.g.)	Stadium: America First Field; Attendance: 21,522; Referee: Allen Chapman

July 6 22	Real Salt Lake	5–2	Atlanta United FC	Sandy, Utah
7:30 pm MT	Crooks 1'; Luna (yellow card) 57', (goal) 84'; Ojeda 59'; Arango 68'; Katranis 78'	Report	Lobzhanidze 31'; Williams (yellow card) 67'; Ríos 80'; Fortune (yellow card) 89'	Stadium: America First Field; Attendance: 20,396; Referee: Rubiel Vazquez

July 13 23	Portland Timbers	3–0	Real Salt Lake	Portland, Oregon
8:00 pm MT	Mora 3', (yellow card) 23'; Chará (yellow card) 7'; Rodríguez (yellow card) 8'; Moreno 48'; Bravo (yellow card) 86'; Evander 90'	Report	Arango (yellow card) 23'; Gómez (yellow card) 23'; Ojeda (yellow card) 37'; Crooks (yellow card) 56'; Luna (yellow card) 63'	Stadium: Providence Park; Attendance: 23,014; Referee: Joe Dickerson

July 17 24	Los Angeles FC	1–1	Real Salt Lake	Los Angeles, California
8:30 pm MT	Olivera 5'; Kamara (yellow card) 41'; Hollingshead (yellow card) 60'	Report	Luna (yellow card) 8'; Vera 33'; Katranis (yellow card) 66'; Chang (yellow card) 71'; Palacio (yellow card) 74'; Glad (yellow card) 90+3'	Stadium: BMO Stadium; Attendance: 22,163; Referee: Guido Gonzales, Jr.

July 20 25 RMC	Colorado Rapids	3–2	Real Salt Lake	Commerce City, Colorado
7:30 pm MT	Bombito (yellow card) 23'; Lewis 35'; Vines 39'; Yapi (yellow card) 74'; Bassett 88'	Report	Gómez 9', 49'; Luna (yellow card) 88'	Stadium: Dick's Sporting Goods Park; Referee: Ramy Touchan

August 24 26	Real Salt Lake	0–2	San Jose Earthquakes	Sandy, Utah
7:30 pm MT	Brook (yellow card) 81'	Report	Espinoza 20'; Pellegrino 33'; Gruezo (yellow card) 37'; Daniel (yellow card) 87'	Stadium: America First Field; Attendance: 21,015; Referee: Ricardo Fierro

August 31 27	Real Salt Lake	2–0	New England Revolution	Sandy, Utah
7:30 pm MT	Ojeda (yellow card) 45+2'; Julio 45+3'; Quinton 56'	Report	Lima (yellow card) 55'	Stadium: America First Field; Attendance: 20,475; Referee: Fotis Bazakos

September 14 28	Houston Dynamo FC	4–1	Real Salt Lake	Houston, Texas
6:30 pm MT	Steres (yellow card) 24'; Bassi 27'; Ponce (yellow card) 39', (goal) 81'; Dorsey 45+3'; Kowalczyk 75'	Report	Arango (yellow card) 32'; Sviatchenko 49' (o.g.); Katranis (yellow card) 63'; Glad (yellow card) 90+4'	Stadium: Shell Energy Stadium; Attendance: 15,862; Referee: Jon Freemon

September 18 29	Real Salt Lake	3–2	FC Dallas	Sandy, Utah
7:30pm MT	Vera 11' (pen.); Julio 24', 62'; Crooks (yellow card) 90'; Eneli (yellow card) 90+10'	Report	Ferreira 45+1'; Velasco 88' (pen.)	Stadium: America First Field; Attendance: 19,436; Referee: Sergii Demianchuk

September 21 30	Real Salt Lake	3–3	Portland Timbers	Sandy, Utah
7:30 pm MT	Marczuk 10'; Luna 22'; Katranis (yellow card) 72'; Gonçalves 90'	Report	Williamson (yellow card) 48'; Miller (yellow card) 55'; Evander (yellow card) 57', (goal) 76'; Antony 62'; Rodríguez 90+2'	Stadium: America First Field; Attendance: 20,778; Referee: Tori Penso

September 28 31	Austin FC	2–2	Real Salt Lake	Austin, Texas
6:30 pm MT	Obrian 82'; Biro 89'	Report	Crooks 48'; Glad (yellow card) 59'; Gonçalves 65' (pen.); Chang (yellow card) 90+6'	Stadium: Q2 Stadium; Attendance: 20,738; Referee: Lukasz Szpala

October 2 32	Real Salt Lake	0–0	Minnesota United FC	Sandy, Utah
7:30 pm MT	Vera (yellow card) 32' (red card) 90+3'; Arango (yellow card) 90'	Report	Díaz (yellow card) 5'; Dotson (yellow card) 24'; Yeboah (yellow card) 34'; Boxall (yellow card) 89'	Stadium: America First Field; Attendance: 19,346; Referee: Ricardo Montero

October 5 33	San Jose Earthquakes	0–1	Real Salt Lake	San Jose, California
8:30 pm MT		Report	Katranis (yellow card) 45'; Julio (yellow card) 53'; Luna 78'; MacMath (yellow card) 85'; Glad (yellow card) 90+5'	Stadium: PayPal Park; Attendance: 16,322; Referee: Mark Allatin

October 19 34	Real Salt Lake	2–1	Vancouver Whitecaps FC	Sandy, Utah
7:00 pm MT	Brown (yellow card) 29'; Katranis (yellow card) 33'; Luna 73'; Boehmer 83' (o.g.)	Report	Picault (yellow card) 13'; Gauld 58'; Blackmon (yellow card) 70'; Adekugbe (yellow card) 72'; Ahmed (yellow card) 85'; Berhalter (yellow card) 90+2'	Stadium: America First Field; Attendance: 20,359; Referee: Armando Villarreal

=== MLS Cup playoffs ===
==== Round One ====
October 29 First leg	Real Salt Lake	0–0 (4–5 p)	Minnesota United FC	Sandy, Utah
7:00 PM MT		Report	Díaz (yellow card) 8'; Trapp (yellow card) 80'	Stadium: America First Field; Attendance: 19,195; Referee: Pierre-Luc Lauzière
	Penalties
	Arango (penalty scored); Gonçalves (penalty scored); Glad (penalty missed); Julio (penalty scored); Eneli (penalty scored); Ojeda (penalty missed)		(penalty scored) Yeboah; (penalty scored) Trapp; (penalty missed) Boxall; (penalty scored) Jeong Sang-bin; (penalty scored) Oluwaseyi; (penalty scored) Díaz

November 2 Second leg	Minnesota United FC	1–1 (3–1 p)	Real Salt Lake	Saint Paul, Minnesota
7:00 PM MT	Rosales 53'	Report	Eneli 75'; Crooks (yellow card) 90+9'	Stadium: Allianz Field; Attendance: 19,912; Referee: Tori Penso
	Penalties
	Yeboah (penalty scored); Dotson (penalty scored); Trapp (penalty missed); Jeong Sang-bin (penalty scored)		(penalty scored) Arango; (penalty missed) Gonçalves; (penalty missed) Crooks; (penalty missed) Luna
Note: Minnesota United FC won the series 2–0.

==== Standings ====
===== Western Conference table =====
Pos	Team	Pld	W	L	T	GF	GA	GD	Pts	Qualification
1	Los Angeles FC	34	19	8	7	63	43	+20	64	MLS Cup Round One
2	LA Galaxy	34	19	8	7	69	50	+19	64	MLS Cup Round One
3	Real Salt Lake	34	16	7	11	65	48	+17	59	MLS Cup Round One
4	Seattle Sounders FC	34	16	9	9	51	35	+16	57	MLS Cup Round One
5	Houston Dynamo FC	34	15	10	9	47	39	+8	54	MLS Cup Round One
6	Minnesota United FC	34	15	12	7	58	49	+9	52	MLS Cup Round One
7	Colorado Rapids	34	15	14	5	61	60	+1	50	MLS Cup Round One
8	Vancouver Whitecaps FC	34	13	13	8	52	49	+3	47	MLS Cup Wild Card
9	Portland Timbers	34	12	11	11	65	56	+9	47	MLS Cup Wild Card
10	Austin FC	34	11	14	9	39	48	−9	42	
11	FC Dallas	34	11	15	8	54	56	−2	41	
12	St. Louis City SC	34	8	13	13	50	63	−13	37	
13	Sporting Kansas City	34	8	19	7	51	66	−15	31	
14	San Jose Earthquakes	34	6	25	3	41	78	−37	21	

Source: MLS
Rules for classification: 1) points; 2) total wins; 3) total goal differential; 4) total goals scored; 5) fewer disciplinary points; 6) away goal differential; 7) away goals scored; 8) home goals differential; 9) home goals scored; 10) coin toss (2 clubs tied) or drawing of lots (≥3 clubs tied)

===== Overall table =====
Pos	Team	Pld	W	L	T	GF	GA	GD	Pts	Qualification
4	LA Galaxy (C)	34	19	8	7	69	50	+19	64	CONCACAF Champions Cup
5	FC Cincinnati	34	18	11	5	58	48	+10	59	CONCACAF Champions Cup
6	Real Salt Lake	34	16	7	11	65	48	+17	59	CONCACAF Champions Cup
7	Seattle Sounders FC	34	16	9	9	51	35	+16	57	CONCACAF Champions Cup
8	Houston Dynamo FC	34	15	10	9	47	39	+8	54	

Source: MLS
Rules for classification: 1) points; 2) total wins; 3) total goal differential; 4) total goals scored; 5) fewer disciplinary points; 6) away goal differential; 7) away goals scored; 8) home goals differential; 9) home goals scored; 10) coin toss (2 clubs tied) or drawing of lots (≥3 clubs tied)
(C) MLS Cup champions

=== Leagues Cup ===
The Leagues Cup will occur between July 26 and August 25, with all MLS teams competing. Real Salt Lake will enter in the group stage as a Tier 2 ranked team, based on 2023 standings.

Pos	Team	Pld	W	PW	PL	L	GF	GA	GD	Pts	Qualification	HOU	ATL	RSL
1	(United States Soccer Federation) Houston Dynamo FC	2	1	0	0	1	3	1	+2	3	Advance to knockout stage	—	0–1	3–0
2	(Mexican Football Federation) Atlas	2	1	0	0	1	2	2	0	3	Advance to knockout stage	—	—	—
3	(United States Soccer Federation) Real Salt Lake	2	1	0	0	1	2	4	−2	3		—	2–1	—

Source: Leagues Cup
Rules for classification: Tiebreakers

August 1 GS	Real Salt Lake (United States)	2–1	(Mexico) Atlas	Sandy, Utah
7:00 p.m. MDT	Hidalgo (yellow card) 34'; Julio 45+2'; Palacio 79'	Report	Reyes 26'; Ríos (yellow card) 88'	Stadium: America First Field; Attendance: 20,956; Referee: Jon Freemon

August 5 GS	Houston Dynamo FC (United States)	3–0	(United States) Real Salt Lake	Houston, Texas
7:00 p.m. MDT	Herrera 7'; Micael 24'; Glad 42' (o.g.); Ponce (yellow card) 62'	Report		Stadium: Shell Energy Stadium; Attendance: 11,062; Referee: Keylor Herrera

=== U.S. Open Cup ===
Real Salt Lake will enter the U.S. Open Cup in the Round of 32.

May 8 Round of 32	New Mexico United	4–2	(Utah) Real Salt Lake	Albuquerque, New Mexico
7:00 pm MDT	Bailey 17', 19', (yellow card) 41'; Maples (yellow card) 30'; Herbert (yellow card) 35'; Hernandez 45+4', (yellow card) 74'; Houssou (yellow card) 69'; Reyes 85'	Report	Hidalgo (yellow card) 16'; Luna (yellow card) 34', (goal) 49'; Barajas 35'; Katranis (yellow card) 84'	Stadium: Isotopes Park; Attendance: 5,266; Referee: Malik Badawi

== Statistics ==
=== Squad appearances ===
As of December 10, 2024

No	Pos	Nat	Player	Total		MLS Regular Season		Leagues Cup		US Open Cup		MLS Cup Playoffs	
No	Pos	Nat	Player	Apps	Starts	Apps	Starts	Apps	Starts	Apps	Starts	Apps	Starts
Goalkeepers
18	GK	(United States)	Zac MacMath	25	25	23	23	0	0	0	0	2	2
35	GK	(United States)	Gavin Beavers	14	14	11	11	2	2	1	1	0	0
81	GK	(United States)	Tomas Gomez	0	0	0	0	0	0	0	0	0	0
Defenders
2	DF	(United States)	Andrew Brody	37	24	33	23	2	0	1	1	1	0
3	DF	(Costa Rica)	Bryan Oviedo	15	6	15	6	0	0	0	0	0	0
4	DF	(Colombia)	Brayan Vera	27	27	24	24	2	2	0	0	1	1
15	DF	(United States)	Justen Glad	31	29	26	25	2	2	1	0	2	2
19	DF	(United States)	Bode Hidalgo	28	18	25	15	2	2	1	1	0	0
20	DF	(United States)	Erik Holt	0	0	0	0	0	0	0	0	0	0
26	DF	(United States)	Philip Quinton	20	16	19	15	0	0	1	1	0	0
30	DF	(Uruguay)	Marcelo Silva	3	2	3	2	0	0	0	0	0	0
32	DF	(United States)	Zack Farnsworth	0	0	0	0	0	0	0	0	0	0
33	DF	(United States)	Tommy Silva	2	1	1	0	0	0	1	1	0	0
36	DF	(United States)	Kevin Bonilla	0	0	0	0	0	0	0	0	0	0
37	DF	(United States)	Luis Rivera	0	0	0	0	0	0	0	0	0	0
91	DF	(Jamaica)	Javain Brown	8	6	6	4	0	0	0	0	2	2
98	DF	(Greece)	Alexandros Katranis	34	27	29	23	2	2	1	0	2	2
Midfielders
6	MF	(Paraguay)	Braian Ojeda	38	36	33	31	2	2	1	1	2	2
7	MF	(Argentina)	Pablo Ruíz	3	2	3	2	0	0	0	0	0	0
8	MF	(United States)	Diego Luna	36	31	31	26	2	2	1	1	2	2
10	MF	(Portugal)	Diogo Goncalves	11	6	9	6	0	0	0	0	2	0
11	MF	(Poland)	Dominik Marczuk	10	7	8	5	0	0	0	0	2	2
12	MF	(Jamaica)	Matthew Bell	1	0	1	0	0	0	0	0	0	0
13	MF	(Colombia)	Nelson Palacio	28	8	23	5	2	1	1	1	2	1
14	MF	(United States)	Emeka Eneli	38	34	33	31	2	1	1	0	2	2
16	MF	(Cuba)	Maikel Chang	24	3	22	3	1	0	0	0	1	0
17	MF	(Australia)	Lachlan Brook	7	3	7	3	0	0	0	0	0	0
25	MF	(England)	Matt Crooks	33	27	29	23	2	2	0	0	2	2
34	MF	(United States)	Luca Moisa	0	0	0	0	0	0	0	0	0	0
38	MF	(United States)	Jude Wellings	0	0	0	0	0	0	0	0	0	0
92	MF	(Germany)	Noel Caliskan	6	2	5	2	1	0	0	0	1	0
Forwards
9	FW	(Colombia)	Chicho Arango	34	27	30	26	1	0	1	0	2	1
21	FW	(Ivory Coast)	Axel Kei	0	0	0	0	0	0	0	0	0	0
23	FW	(United States)	Ilijah Paul	0	0	0	0	0	0	0	0	0	0
27	FW	(France)	Bertin Jacquesson	1	0	0	0	0	0	1	0	0	0
28	FW	(United States)	Benji Michel	4	0	2	0	2	0	0	0	0	0
29	FW	(Ecuador)	Anderson Julio	38	16	33	13	2	2	1	0	2	1
72	FW	(United States)	Zavier Gozo	2	1	1	0	0	0	1	1	0	0
Other players (Departed during season, short-term loan, etc.)
11	FW	(Colombia)	Andrés Gómez	25	24	23	22	2	2	0	0	0	0
14	FW	(Guatemala)	Rubio Rubin	0	0	0	0	0	0	0	0	0	0
17	MF	(Mexico)	Fidel Barajas	18	6	17	5	0	0	1	1	0	0
22	DF	(Haiti)	Delentz Pierre	0	0	0	0	0	0	0	0	0	0
31	MF	(Jamaica)	Kevon Lambert	0	0	0	0	0	0	0	0	0	0

=== Goals ===
As of December 10, 2024

Goals
Rank	Player	Nation	Total	MLS Regular Season	Leagues Cup	US Open Cup	MLS Cup Playoffs
1	Chicho Arango	(Colombia)	17	17			
2	Andrés Gómez	(Colombia)	13	13			
3	Anderson Julio	(Ecuador)	10	9	1		
4	Diego Luna	(United States)	9	8		1	
5	Matt Crooks	(England)	3	3			
5	Alexandros Katranis	(Greece)	3	3			
7	Emeka Eneli	(United States)	2	1			1
7	Diogo Gonçalves	(Portugal)	2	2			
7	Braian Ojeda	(Paraguay)	2	2			
7	Nelson Palacio	(Colombia)	2	1	1		
7	Brayan Vera	(Colombia)	2	2			
12	Dominik Marczuk	(Poland)	1	1			
12	Philip Quinton	(United States)	1	1			
12	Fidel Barajas	(Mexico)	1			1	

=== Assists ===
As of December 10, 2024

Assists
Rank	Player	Nation	Total	MLS Regular Season	Leagues Cup	US Open Cup	MLS Cup Playoffs
1	Chicho Arango	(Colombia)	13	12			1
2	Diego Luna	(United States)	12	12			
3	Andrés Gómez	(Colombia)	10	9	1		
4	Matt Crooks	(England)	6	5			1
4	Braian Ojeda	(Paraguay)	6	6			
6	Alexandros Katranis	(Greece)	5	5			
7	Emeka Eneli	(United States)	3	3			
7	Anderson Julio	(Ecuador)	3	2		1	
9	Fidel Barajas	(Mexico)	2	2			
9	Andrew Brody	(United States)	2	2			
9	Maikel Chang	(Cuba)	2	2			
9	Bryan Oviedo	(Costa Rica)	2	2			
9	Brayan Vera	(Colombia)	2	2			
14	Gavin Beavers	(United States)	1	1			
14	Justen Glad	(United States)	1		1		
14	Diogo Goncalves	(Portugal)	1	1			
14	Bode Hidalgo	(United States)	1	1			
14	Dominik Marczuk	(Poland)	1	1			
14	Nelson Palacio	(Colombia)	1	1			
14	Zavier Gozo	(United States)	1			1	

=== Clean Sheets ===
As of December 10, 2024

Shutouts
Rank	Player	Nation	Total	MLS Regular Season	Leagues Cup	US Open Cup	MLS Cup Playoffs
1	Zac MacMath	(United States)	7	6			1
2	Gavin Beavers	(United States)	3	3			
