= 2026 MLS Cup playoffs =

2026 edition of the MLS playoffs

Tournament details
- Country: United States; Canada
- Dates: November 19 – December 18
- Teams: 18

Tournament statistics
- Matches played: 5
- Goals scored: 14 (2.8 per match)
- Attendance: 75,784 (15,157 per match)
- Top goal scorer(s): Evander (FC Cincinnati); Joaquín Valiente (FC Dallas); 2 goals each
- All statistics correct as of November 21, 2026.

The 2026 MLS Cup playoffs (branded as the Audi 2026 MLS Cup Playoffs for sponsorship reasons) is the post-season championship of Major League Soccer (MLS), the top soccer league in the United States and Canada. It is the 31st edition of the MLS Cup playoffs, following the conclusion of the 2026 season. The playoffs began on November 19 and will conclude with MLS Cup 2026 on December 18.

Inter Miami CF enter the playoffs as the defending MLS Cup champions. Nashville SC enter as Supporters' Shield and Eastern Conference regular season champions, while Vancouver Whitecaps FC enter as Western Conference regular season champions. The 2026 playoffs marked the first time since 2009 where no teams from the New York metropolitan area qualified.

== Format ==
Since the 2023 edition, the MLS Cup playoffs have been contested by a field of 18 teams—the top nine teams from each conference. The top seven teams in each conference automatically qualified for round one, while the eighth and ninth-placed teams in each conference played a single wild card match to determine who drew the best-ranked team in their conference, with only a penalty shoot-out occurring if the game was tied.

The first round will comprise a best-of-three format, with higher seeds playing against lower seeds. The round will not use an aggregate score, and tied matches will proceed directly to a penalty shoot-out to determine the winner. The remaining three rounds—the conference semifinals, conference finals, and MLS Cup—will be single-elimination matches played with extra time and a penalty shoot-out if still tied.

The team with the better regular season record will host in the first and third (should it be necessary) match(es) of the best-of-three series in round one, where the team with the lower regular season record will host the second best-of-three match. The semi-finals and finals will be hosted by whichever team has the higher seed. All matches will be broadcast globally on Apple TV, a streaming service operated by Apple. Select matches will be available on Fox Sports channels in the US.

== Qualified teams ==
The playoffs will be contested by 18 teams. The date listed indicates when each team qualified for the playoffs.

Eastern Conference

- Charlotte FC (October 28)
- Chicago Fire FC (October 17)
- FC Cincinnati (October 31)
- Columbus Crew (November 1)
- Inter Miami CF (October 14)
- Nashville SC (September 19)
- New England Revolution (October 14)
- Orlando City SC (November 1)
- Philadelphia Union (October 28)

Western Conference

- FC Dallas (October 14)
- Houston Dynamo FC (October 17)
- Los Angeles FC (October 25)
- Portland Timbers (November 7)
- Real Salt Lake (November 7)
- San Jose Earthquakes (October 17)
- Seattle Sounders FC (November 7)
- St. Louis City SC (October 14)
- Vancouver Whitecaps FC (October 10)

== Conference standings ==
Eastern Conference

MLS Eastern Conference table (2026)
Pos	Team	Pld	Pts
1	Nashville SC	34	77
2	Inter Miami CF	34	60
3	New England Revolution	34	58
4	Chicago Fire FC	34	55
5	Charlotte FC	34	54
6	Philadelphia Union	34	50
7	Columbus Crew	34	47
8	Orlando City SC	34	46
9	FC Cincinnati	34	46

Source: MLS

Western Conference

MLS Western Conference table (2026)
Pos	Team	Pld	Pts
1	Vancouver Whitecaps FC	34	64
2	FC Dallas	34	58
3	St. Louis City SC	34	54
4	San Jose Earthquakes	34	52
5	Houston Dynamo FC	34	51
6	Los Angeles FC	34	47
7	Portland Timbers	34	46
8	Seattle Sounders FC	34	46
9	Real Salt Lake	34	45

Source: MLS

== Bracket ==
The higher seeded teams host single-elimination matches, with the MLS Cup host determined by overall points in the Supporters' Shield table. During the best-of-three round, the team with higher seed hosts the first match (and the third match, if required).

Wild card single match
E8	Orlando City SC	1
E9	FC Cincinnati	3
W8	Seattle Sounders FC	1 (2)
W9	Real Salt Lake (p)	1 (4)

Round one best-of-three series
E1	Nashville SC	0
E9	FC Cincinnati	1
E4	Chicago Fire FC
E5	Charlotte FC
E2	Inter Miami CF	0
E7	Columbus Crew	3
E3	New England Revolution	2
E6	Philadelphia Union	0
W1	Vancouver Whitecaps FC
W9	Real Salt Lake
W4	San Jose Earthquakes
W5	Houston Dynamo FC
W2	FC Dallas	3
W7	Portland Timbers	0
W3	St. Louis City SC
W6	Los Angeles FC

Conference semifinals single match
Eastern Conference
Western Conference

Conference finals single match

MLS Cup single match

== Wild card round ==
Home team	Score	Away team
Eastern Conference
Orlando City SC	1–3	FC Cincinnati
Western Conference
Seattle Sounders FC	1–1 (2–4 p)	Real Salt Lake

=== Eastern Conference ===
November 19
7:30 pm EST

Orlando City SC	1–3	FC Cincinnati
M. Ojeda 26'	Report	Evander 43' (pen.), 50'; Gidi 85'

Inter.co Stadium, Orlando, Florida
Attendance: 17,147
Referee: Rubiel Vazquez

=== Western Conference ===
November 19
7:00 pm PST

Seattle Sounders FC	1–1	Real Salt Lake
Rusnák 36'	Report	Guilavogui 63'
Penalties
Joveljić (penalty missed); Rusnák (penalty missed); Rothrock (penalty scored); Brunell (penalty scored)	2–4	(penalty scored) Solans; (penalty scored) Engel; (penalty scored) Hezarkhani; (penalty scored) Quinton

Lumen Field, Seattle, Washington
Attendance: 29,628
Referee: Jon Freemon

== Round one ==
Team 1	Series	Team 2	Game 1	Game 2	Game 3
Eastern Conference
Nashville SC	v	FC Cincinnati	0–1	Nov 28	Dec 2
Inter Miami CF	v	Columbus Crew	0–3	Nov 27	Dec 2
New England Revolution	v	Philadelphia Union	2–0	Nov 28	Dec 2
Chicago Fire FC	v	Charlotte FC	Nov 22	Nov 28	Dec 2
Western Conference
Vancouver Whitecaps FC	v	Real Salt Lake	Nov 22	Nov 27	Dec 2
FC Dallas	v	Portland Timbers	3–0	Nov 28	Dec 2
St. Louis City SC	v	Los Angeles FC	Nov 23	Nov 28	Dec 2
San Jose Earthquakes	v	Houston Dynamo FC	Nov 24	Nov 28	Dec 2

=== Eastern Conference ===
November 22
3:00 pm CST

Nashville SC	0–1	FC Cincinnati
	Report	Yazbek 7' (o.g.)

Geodis Park, Nashville, Tennessee
Referee: Fotis Bazakos
November 28
6:30 pm EST

FC Cincinnati	v	Nashville SC
	Report

TQL Stadium, Cincinnati, Ohio
December 2
CST

Nashville SC	v	FC Cincinnati
	Report

Geodis Park, Nashville, Tennessee

November 21
6:00 pm EST

Inter Miami CF	0–3	Columbus Crew
	Report	Tapia 9' (pen.), 58'; Habroune 52'

Nu Stadium, Miami, Florida
Referee: Allen Chapman
November 27
8:00 pm EST

Columbus Crew	v	Inter Miami CF
	Report

ScottsMiracle-Gro Field, Columbus, Ohio
December 2
EST

Inter Miami CF	v	Columbus Crew
	Report

Nu Stadium, Miami, Florida

November 21
2:00 pm EST

New England Revolution	2–0	Philadelphia Union
Harriel 10' (o.g.); Miller 73'	Report

Gillette Stadium, Foxborough, Massachusetts
Attendance: 18,084
Referee: Lorenzo Hernandez
November 28
4:30 pm EST

Philadelphia Union	v	New England Revolution
	Report

Subaru Park, Chester, Pennsylvania
December 2
EST

New England Revolution	v	Philadelphia Union
	Report

Gillette Stadium, Foxborough, Massachusetts

November 22
5:30 pm CST

Chicago Fire FC	v	Charlotte FC
	Report

SeatGeek Stadium, Bridgeview, Illinois
Referee: Filip Dujic
November 28
12:30 pm EST

Charlotte FC	v	Chicago Fire FC
	Report

Bank of America Stadium, Charlotte, North Carolina
December 2
CST

Chicago Fire FC	v	Charlotte FC
	Report

SeatGeek Stadium, Bridgeview, Illinois

=== Western Conference ===
November 22
6:30 pm PCT

Vancouver Whitecaps FC	v	Real Salt Lake
	Report

BC Place, Vancouver, British Columbia
Referee: Chris Penso
November 27
8:00 pm MST

Real Salt Lake	v	Vancouver Whitecaps FC
	Report

America First Field, Sandy, Utah
December 2
PCT

Vancouver Whitecaps FC	v	Real Salt Lake
	Report

BC Place, Vancouver, British Columbia

November 21
3:00 pm CST

FC Dallas	3–0	Portland Timbers
Valiente 53', 55'; Sarver 90+4'	Report

Toyota Stadium, Frisco, Texas
Attendance: 10,925
Referee: Alexis Da Silva
November 28
7:30 pm PST

Portland Timbers	v	FC Dallas
	Report

Providence Park, Portland, Oregon
December 2
CST

FC Dallas	v	Portland Timbers
	Report

Toyota Stadium, Frisco, Texas

November 23
7:00 pm CST

St. Louis City SC	v	Los Angeles FC
	Report

Energizer Park, St. Louis, Missouri
November 28
5:30 pm PST

Los Angeles FC	v	St. Louis City SC
	Report

BMO Stadium, Los Angeles, California
December 2
CST

St. Louis City SC	v	Los Angeles FC
	Report

Energizer Park, St. Louis, Missouri

November 24
7:00 pm PST

San Jose Earthquakes	v	Houston Dynamo FC
	Report

PayPal Park, San Jose, California
November 28
1:30 pm CST

Houston Dynamo FC	v	San Jose Earthquakes
	Report

Shell Energy Stadium, Houston, Texas
December 2
PST

San Jose Earthquakes	v	Houston Dynamo FC
	Report

PayPal Park, San Jose, California

== Conference semifinals ==
The higher-seeded team as determined by regular season ranking will host the match.

Home team	Score	Away team
Eastern Conference
	Dec 5–6	
	Dec 5–6	
Western Conference
	Dec 5–6	
	Dec 5–6	

=== Eastern Conference ===
December 5–6

v

December 5–6

v

=== Western Conference ===
December 5–6

v

December 5–6

v

== Conference finals ==
The higher-seeded team as determined by regular season ranking will host the match.

Home team	Score	Away team
Eastern Conference
	Dec 11–12	
Western Conference
	Dec 11–12	

=== Eastern Conference ===
December 11–12

v

=== Western Conference ===
December 11–12

v

== MLS Cup 2026 ==
The higher-ranked finalist in the overall Supporters' Shield table will host the match.

December 18, 2026

v
