= Zavier Gozo =

American soccer player

Personal information
- Full name: Zavier Didier Tapei Gozo
- Date of birth: March 22, 2007 (age 19)
- Place of birth: West Valley City, Utah, US
- Height: 5 ft 11 in (1.80 m)
- Positions: Winger; forward

Team information
- Current team: Crystal Palace
- Number: 12

Youth career
- Comba FC
- La Roca FC
- 2021–2022: Real Salt Lake

Senior career*
Years	Team	Apps	(Gls)
2022–2025	Real Monarchs	10	(1)
2023	→ Real Salt Lake (loan)	1	(0)
2024–2026	Real Salt Lake	42	(10)
2024–2025	→ Real Monarchs (loan)	17	(5)
2026–	Crystal Palace	2	(0)

International career^{‡}
2022	United States U15	3	(0)
2022	United States U16	3	(2)
2025	United States U19	3	(0)
2024–	United States U20	16	(3)
2025–	United States U23	2	(0)
2026–	United States	1	(0)
Medal record
Men's football
Representing United States
CONCACAF U-20 Championship
Runner-up	2024 Mexico
- * Club domestic league appearances and goals as of 05:34, 22 October 2026 (UTC) ‡ National team caps and goals as of September 26, 2026

Zavier Didier Tapei Gozo (born March 22, 2007) is an American professional soccer player who plays as a winger or forward for Premier League club Crystal Palace and the United States national team.

== Club career ==
=== Real Salt Lake ===
Gozo was a youth product of Comba FC and La Roca FC, before signing with the academy of Real Salt Lake in 2021. On December 14, 2022, he signed his first professional contract with Real Monarchs, an affiliate of Real Salt Lake. On October 13, 2023, Gozo was called up to RSL for his first Major League Soccer match. He debuted with RSL in a 2–2 Major League Soccer tie with LA Galaxy on October 15. On February 20, 2024, Gozo signed a contract with RSL in the MLS until 2027, with an option to extend until 2029.

=== Crystal Palace ===
On August 18, 2026, Gozo signed with Premier League club Crystal Palace on a five-year deal. He made his league debut for the club, coming on as 68th-minute substitute in a 4–1 loss to Manchester City on August 28.

== International career ==
Born in the United States, Gozo was born to an Ivorian father and American mother. He was part of the United States U20s that finished as runners-up at the 2024 CONCACAF U-20 Championship.

In September 2026, Gozo was called up for the first time to the senior United States national team by former head coach Mauricio Pochettino, as one of a 28 man squad for friendly matches against Peru, Chile, Mexico and Canada on September 26 and 29 and October 3 and 6, 2026 respectively.

== Career statistics ==
=== Club ===
As of match played October 21, 2026

Appearances and goals by club, season and competition
Club	Season	League			National cup (Note: Includes U.S. Open Cup, FA Cup)		League cup (Note: Includes EFL Cup)		Continental		Other		Total	
Club	Season	Division	Apps	Goals	Apps	Goals	Apps	Goals	Apps	Goals	Apps	Goals	Apps	Goals
Real Monarchs	2023	MLS Next Pro	10	1	―		―		―		―		10	1
Real Salt Lake (loan)	2023	MLS	1	0	0	0	―		―		0	0	1	0
Real Salt Lake	2024	MLS	1	0	1	0	―		―		0	0	2	0
Real Salt Lake	2025	MLS	25	4	―		―		2 (Note: Appearances in CONCACAF Champions Cup)	0	4 (Note: Three appearances in Leagues Cup, one appearance in MLS Cup playoffs)	0	31	4
Real Salt Lake	2026	MLS	16	6	―		―		―		―		16	6
Real Salt Lake	RSL total		43	10	1	0	—		2	0	4	0	50	10
Real Monarchs (loan)	2024	MLS Next Pro	16	5	―		―		―		―		16	5
Real Monarchs (loan)	2025	MLS Next Pro	1	0	―		―		―		―		1	0
Real Monarchs (loan)	Total		17	5	—		—		—		—		17	5
Crystal Palace	2026–27	Premier League	2	0	0	0	1	0	0	0	—		3	0
Career total			72	11	1	0	1	0	2	0	4	0	80	11

=== International ===
As of match played September 26, 2026

Appearances and goals by national team and year
National team	Year	Apps	Goals
United States	2026	1	0
Total		1	0

== Personal life ==
Gozo is a member of The Church of Jesus Christ of Latter-day Saints.

== Honors ==
Individual

- MLS All-Star: 2026
