= Gavin Beavers =

American soccer player (born 2005)

Personal information
- Full name: Gavin Lee Beavers
- Date of birth: April 29, 2005 (age 21)
- Place of birth: Henderson, Nevada, U.S.
- Height: 6 ft 5 in (1.96 m)
- Position: Goalkeeper

Team information
- Current team: Brøndby
- Number: 13

Youth career
- Real Salt Lake

Senior career*
Years	Team	Apps	(Gls)
2021–2024	Real Monarchs	21	(0)
2022–2024	Real Salt Lake	18	(0)
2025–	Brøndby	3	(0)

International career^{‡}
2022	United States U17	1	(0)
2022–2024	United States U19	1	(0)
2024	United States U20	4	(0)
- * Club domestic league appearances and goals as of November 28, 2024 ‡ National team caps and goals as of June 10, 2025

Gavin Lee Beavers (born April 29, 2005) is an American professional soccer player who plays as a goalkeeper for Danish Superliga club Brøndby IF.

== Club career ==
Beavers is a product of the Real Salt Lake youth academy. He made his senior debut for Real Monarchs, Real Salt Lake's USL Championship affiliate, on June 26, 2021, starting in the 1–1 draw. At the age of 16, Beavers became the youngest ever goalkeeper in the league's history. On September 3, 2021, Beavers signed a professional deal with Real Monarchs.

On January 12, 2022, Beavers signed a homegrown player contract with Real Salt Lake's first team roster in Major League Soccer.

On January 22, 2025, Brøndby announced the signing of Beavers on a contract running until June 2028. He made his debut for the club on April 18, 2025 in a Danish Superliga match against Nordsjælland, following the suspension of both first- and second-choice goalkeepers Patrick Pentz and Thomas Mikkelsen, who had each received a red card in the previous fixture against FC Copenhagen. Beavers kept a clean sheet in a goalless draw.

== Career statistics ==
=== Club ===
As of match played February 25, 2026

Appearances and goals by club, season and competition
Club	Season	League			National cup		Continental		Other		Total	
Club	Season	Division	Apps	Goals	Apps	Goals	Apps	Goals	Apps	Goals	Apps	Goals
Real Monarchs	2021	USL	2	0	—		—		—		2	0
Real Monarchs	2022	MLS Next Pro	15	0	—		—		—		15	0
Real Monarchs	2023	MLS Next Pro	3	0	—		—		—		3	0
Real Monarchs	2024	MLS Next Pro	1	0	—		—		—		1	0
Real Monarchs	Total		21	0	—		—		—		21	0
Real Salt Lake	2023	MLS	7	0	4	0	—		1 (Note: Appearance(s) in Leagues Cup)	0	12	0
Real Salt Lake	2024	MLS	11	0	1	0	—		2	0	12	0
Real Salt Lake	Total		18	0	5	0	—		3	0	26	0
Brøndby IF	2024–25	Danish Superliga	1	0	0	0	—		—		1	0
Brøndby IF	2025–26	Danish Superliga	2	0	0	0	—		—		2	0
Total		Danish Superliga	3	0	0	—		—		3	0	
Career total			42	0	5	0	0	0	3	0	50	0
