= United States men's national under-19 soccer team =

National under-19 soccer team

United States Under-19
- Nickname(s): Team USA; The Stars and Stripes; The Yanks
- Association: United States; Soccer Federation
- Confederation: CONCACAF (North America)
- Head coach: Gonzalo Segares
- FIFA code: USA
First colors	Second colors
- Website: ussoccer.com/u-19

The United States U-19 men's national soccer team is overseen by the United States Soccer Federation.

== Recent results and fixtures ==
The following is a list of match results in the last 12 months, as well as any future matches that have been scheduled.

Win Draw Loss Fixture

=== 2025 ===
November 12 UEFA U-19 Youth Tournament	United States	2–1	Germany	Rhyl, Wales
4:30 pm BST	Dillis 25', 75'	Report	Neininger 37'	Stadium: Hops & Barley Community Stadium

November 15 UEFA U-19 Youth Tournament	Wales	1–1	United States	Wrexham, Wales
2:30 pm BST	Bradbury 14'; Kasvosve (yellow card) 38'; Clarke (yellow card) 69'	Report	Miller (yellow card) 22'; Willey (yellow card) 45+1'; Shore 67'; Pierre (yellow card) 90+4'	Stadium: Racecourse Ground

November 18 UEFA U-19 Youth Tournament	United States	1–0	Japan	Wrexham, Wales
11:00 am BST	Pita 81'	Report		Stadium: Racecourse Ground

=== 2026 ===
March 28 friendly	Wales	0–4	United States	Oliva, Spain
		Report	Sullivan; Morales; Brunell; Ellis	Stadium: Oliva Nova Sports Center

September 29 friendly	Wales	0–2	United States	Marbella, Spain
		Report	Dayes; (o.g.)	Stadium: Banús Football Center

October 2 friendly	England	v	United States	Marbella, Spain
				Stadium: Marbella Football Center

October 5 friendly	Norway	3–4	United States	Marbella, Spain
		Report	Reed, Adams; LeBlanc	Stadium: Banús Football Center

== Players ==
=== Current squad ===
20 players were called up for the September/October 2026 friendlies.

Caps and goals updated as of match on November 15, 2025 vs. Wales U-19.

No.	Pos.	Player	Date of birth (age)	Caps	Goals	Club
	GK	William Lodmell	February 5, 2008 (age 18)	0	0	(Portuguese Football Federation) Sporting CP Academy
	GK	Aidan Stokes	January 14, 2008 (age 18)	0	0	(United States Soccer Federation) New York Red Bulls II
	DF	Parker Amoo-Mensah	February 29, 2008 (age 18)	0	0	(United States Soccer Federation) Orlando City B
	DF	Andrei Chirilă	August 15, 2008 (age 18)	0	0	(United States Soccer Federation) FC Cincinnati 2
	DF	Brandon Dayes	December 17, 2008 (age 17)	0	0	(United States Soccer Federation) Louisville City
	DF	Matthew Henrique Dos Santos	June 5, 2008 (age 18)	0	0	(United States Soccer Federation) New York Red Bulls
	DF	Jacob Hall	December 9, 2008 (age 17)	0	0	(United States Soccer Federation) Chelsea Academy
	DF	Ryan Hartley	February 13, 2008 (age 18)	0	0	(United States Soccer Federation) Ventura County FC
	MF	Máximo Carrizo	February 28, 2008 (age 18)	0	0	(United States Soccer Federation) New York City FC
	MF	Kellan LeBlanc	May 17, 2008 (age 18)	0	0	(United States Soccer Federation) Philadelphia Union II
	MF	Luca Moisa	April 20, 2008 (age 18)	0	0	(United States Soccer Federation) Real Salt Lake
	MF	Cristiano Oliveira	March 30, 2008 (age 18)	0	0	(United States Soccer Federation) New England Revolution
	MF	Alexander Shaw	April 3, 2008 (age 18)	0	0	(United States Soccer Federation) Inter Miami
	MF	Jude Terry	October 8, 2008 (age 18)	0	0	(United States Soccer Federation) LAFC
	FW	Chase Adams	April 17, 2008 (age 18)	0	0	(United States Soccer Federation) Columbus Crew
	FW	Dennis Nelich	March 3, 2008 (age 18)	0	0	(United States Soccer Federation) New York Red Bulls
	FW	Eric Preston	January 31, 2008 (age 18)	0	0	(United States Soccer Federation) Ventura County FC
	FW	Theo Reed	November 14, 2008 (age 17)	0	0	(United States Soccer Federation) Philadelphia Union Academy
	FW	Damyan Villanueva	August 22, 2008 (age 18)	0	0	(United States Soccer Federation) Chicago Fire Academy
	FW	Gabriel Wesseh	June 8, 2008 (age 18)	0	0	(Norwegian Football Federation) Fredrikstad FK

=== Recent call-ups ===
The following players have been called up in the past 12 months.

- June 2026 friendly.
- March 2026 friendlies.
- January 2026 training camp.
- November 2025 friendlies.

Pos.	Player	Date of birth (age)	Caps	Goals	Club	Latest call-up
GK	Giorgio De Marzi	April 18, 2007 (age 19)	0	0	(Italy) Roma	June 2026 friendly
GK	Lucas McPartlin	June 16, 2007 (age 19)	0	0	(United States) St. Louis City 2	June 2026 friendly
GK	Zackory Campagnolo	March 12, 2007 (age 19)	1	0	(United States) Colorado Rapids 2	March 2026 friendlies
GK	Jacob Molinaro	January 16, 2007 (age 19)	0	0	(United States) Sporting Kansas City II	January 2026 training camp
GK	Jackson Smith	December 22, 2007 (age 18)	0	0	(United States) North Carolina State	January 2026 training camp
GK	Kayne Rizvanovich	October 26, 2007 (age 18)	1	0	(United States) Minnesota United Academy	November 2025 friendlies
DF	Tristan Brown	October 17, 2006 (age 19)	1	0	(United States) Columbus Crew	June 2026 friendly
DF	Dominik Chong-Qui	December 27, 2006 (age 19)	1	0	(United States) Atlanta United FC	June 2026 friendly
DF	Christopher Cupps	May 26, 2008 (age 18)	0	0	(United States) Chicago Fire FC II	June 2026 friendly
DF	Braden Dunham	October 3, 2007 (age 19)	0	0	(United States) Furman	June 2026 friendly
DF	Ramiz Hamouda	May 26, 2008 (age 18)	0	0	(United States) Birmingham Legion FC	June 2026 friendly
DF	Harbor Miller	June 21, 2007 (age 19)	5	1	(United States) LA Galaxy	June 2026 friendly
DF	Javaun Mussenden	September 5, 2007 (age 19)	0	0	(United States) New England Revolution II	June 2026 friendly
DF	Andrew Baiera	February 28, 2007 (age 19)	2	0	(United States) New York City FC	March 2026 friendlies
DF	Jose Magana Jr.	January 7, 2007 (age 19)	0	0	(United States) Ventura County FC	March 2026 friendlies
DF	Neil Pierre	19 October 2007 (age 18)	5	0	(Denmark) Lyngby	March 2026 friendlies
DF	Joshua Torquato	July 24, 2007 (age 19)	0	0	(United States) FC Dallas	March 2026 friendlies
DF	Nicholas De Almeida	February 20, 2007 (age 19)	0	0	(United States) Inter Miami CF II	January 2026 training camp
DF	Gustavo Gonzalez	June 24, 2007 (age 19)	0	0	(United States) UC Irvine	January 2026 training camp
DF	Omar Robbana	September 13, 2007 (age 19)	0	0	(United States) Vermont	January 2026 training camp
DF	Chris Applewhite	August 23, 2006 (age 20)	1	0	(United States) Nashville SC	November 2025 friendlies
DF	Chibuike Ukaegbu	April 28, 2007 (age 19)	3	0	(United States) Sacramento Republic FC	November 2025 friendlies
MF	Snyder Brunell	March 27, 2007 (age 19)	1	0	(United States) Seattle Sounders	June 2026 friendly
MF	Colin Guske	January 29, 2007 (age 19)	3	0	(United States) Orlando City SC	June 2026 friendly
MF	Santiago Morales	February 9, 2007 (age 19)	1	0	(United States) Inter Miami CF	June 2026 friendly
MF	Axel Perez	January 15, 2007 (age 19)	0	0	(Spain) Castellón B	June 2026 friendly
MF	Cooper Sanchez	March 26, 2008 (age 18)	0	0	(United States) Atlanta United	June 2026 friendly
MF	Jonathan Shore	April 13, 2007 (age 19)	4	1	(United States) New York City FC	June 2026 friendly
MF	Ervin Torres	November 14, 2007 (age 18)	3	0	(United States) Austin FC	March 2026 friendlies
MF	Mateo Clark	April 25, 2007 (age 19)	0	0	(United States) Whitecaps FC 2	January 2026 training camp
MF	Eric Izoita	September 8, 2007 (age 19)	0	0	(United States) Portland Timbers Academy	January 2026 training camp
MF	Javaun Mussenden	September 5, 2007 (age 19)	0	0	(United States) New England Revolution II	January 2026 training camp
MF	Jack Pymm	March 9, 2007 (age 19)	0	0	(United States) Stanford	January 2026 training camp
MF	Blake Willey	April 28, 2007 (age 19)	1	0	(United States) Sacramento Republic FC	November 2025 friendlies
FW	Nimfasha Berchimas	February 22, 2008 (age 18)	0	0	(United States) Charlotte FC	June 2026 friendly
FW	Marvin Dills	April 25, 2007 (age 19)	1	0	(Germany) Eintracht Frankfurt	June 2026 friendly
FW	Justin Ellis	14 May 2007 (age 19)	1	0	(United States) Orlando City SC	June 2026 friendly
FW	Aiden Hezarkhani	June 28, 2007 (age 19)	0	0	(United States) Real Salt Lake	June 2026 friendly
FW	Dániel Pintér	6 June 2007 (age 19)	0	0	(United States) Inter Miami CF	June 2026 friendly
FW	Rubén Ramos	22 January 2007 (age 19)	2	0	(United States) LA Galaxy	June 2026 friendly
FW	Colton Swan	May 3, 2007 (age 19)	0	0	(United States) Charleston Battery	June 2026 friendly
FW	Mathis Albert	May 21, 2009 (age 17)	0	0	(Germany) Borussia Dortmund	March 2026 friendlies
FW	Cavan Sullivan	September 28, 2009 (age 17)	0	0	(United States) Philadelphia Union	March 2026 friendlies
FW	Jaidyn Contreras	September 26, 2007 (age 19)	0	0	(United States) North Texas SC	January 2026 training camp
FW	James Lane	November 9, 2007 (age 18)	0	0	(United States) Los Angeles FC Academy	January 2026 training camp
FW	Darius Randell	August 25, 2007 (age 19)	0	0	(United States) Minnesota United FC	January 2026 training camp
FW	Santiago Pita	1 June 2007 (age 19)	1	0	(United States) Atlanta United 2	November 2025 friendlies
FW	Dylan Vanney	November 29, 2007 (age 18)	1	0	(United States) Ventura County FC	November 2025 friendlies

- PRE - Withdrawn prior to competition
- INJ - Withdrawn for injury

== Competitive record ==
=== Pan American Games ===
Pan American Games
Year	Host	Result	Pos	Pld	W	D	L	F	A	Squad
1951–1983		See United States men's national soccer team								
1987–1995		See United States men's national under-20 soccer team								
1999	Canada	See United States men's national under-23 soccer team								
2003	Dominican Republic	did not participate								
2007	Brazil	See United States men's national under-18 soccer team								
2011	Mexico	did not participate								
2015	Canada	did not participate								
2019	Peru	did not participate								
2023	Chile	Fourth place	4th	5	2	0	3	5	7	Squad
2027	Colombia	to be determined								
Total		—		5	2	0	3	5	7	—

== Honors ==
- Slovenia Nations Cup
  - Winners (1): 2022

== Head coaches ==
Name	Years	Ref.
Brad Friedel	2016–2017	
Curt Onalfo (interim)	2019	
Marko Mitrović	2022–2023	
Michael Nsien	2023–2025	
Rob Valentino	2025	
Gonzalo Segares	2026–	

== See also ==
- United States Soccer Federation
- United States men's national soccer team
- United States men's national under-17 soccer team
- United States men's national under-20 soccer team
- United States men's national under-23 soccer team
