= Dominik Marczuk =

Polish footballer (born 2003)

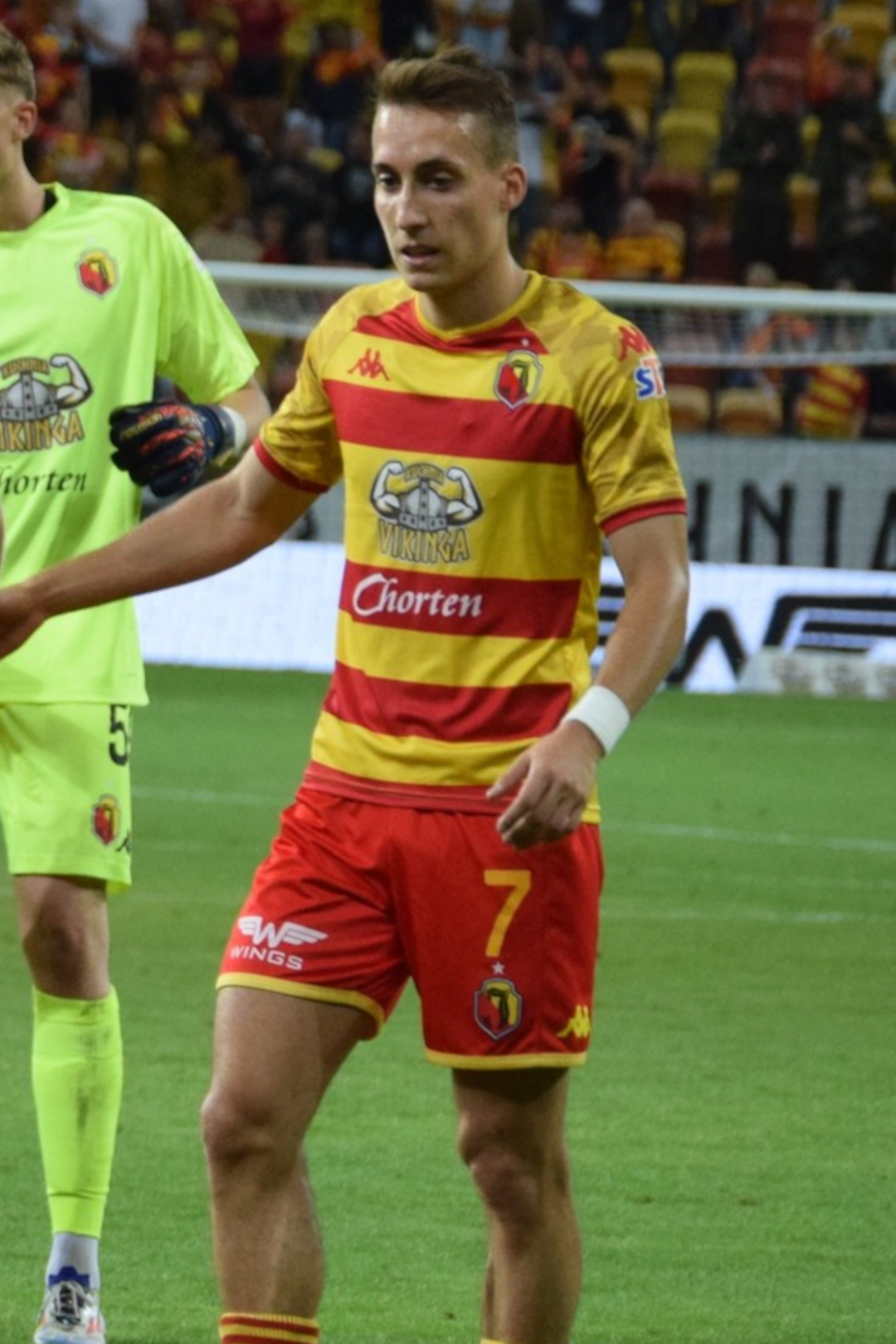
- Marczuk with Jagiellonia Białystok in 2024

Personal information
- Date of birth: 1 November 2003 (age 23)
- Place of birth: Międzyrzec Podlaski, Poland
- Height: 1.78 m (5 ft 10 in)
- Positions: Right winger; right wing-back

Team information
- Current team: Real Salt Lake
- Number: 11

Youth career
- –2017: Huragan Międzyrzec Podlaski
- 2017–2018: Górnik Łęczna
- 2018–2019: TOP 54 Biała Podlaska

Senior career*
Years	Team	Apps	(Gls)
2019–2020	Podlasie Biała Podlaska	19	(0)
2020–2023	Stal Rzeszów	60	(5)
2023–2024	Jagiellonia Białystok	37	(6)
2024–	Real Salt Lake	43	(4)
2025	→ FC Cincinnati (loan)	5	(0)

International career^{‡}
2021	Poland U19	5	(1)
2021–2023	Poland U20	4	(1)
2023–2025	Poland U21	12	(2)
2024	Poland	1	(1)
- * Club domestic league appearances and goals as of 14:19, 25 October 2026 (UTC) ‡ National team caps and goals as of 20:58, 22 August 2025 (UTC)

Dominik Marczuk (born 1 November 2003) is a Polish professional footballer who plays as a right winger or right wing-back for Major League Soccer club Real Salt Lake.

== Club career ==
Born in Międzyrzec Podlaski, Marczuk joined Górnik Łęczna's academy in 2017, but started his senior career with Podlasie Biała Podlaska as a 16-year-old.

=== Stal Rzeszów ===
After a season in the III liga, he joined Stal Rzeszów in the upper division, playing a central role in making them gain promotion in I liga.

=== Jagiellonia Białystok ===
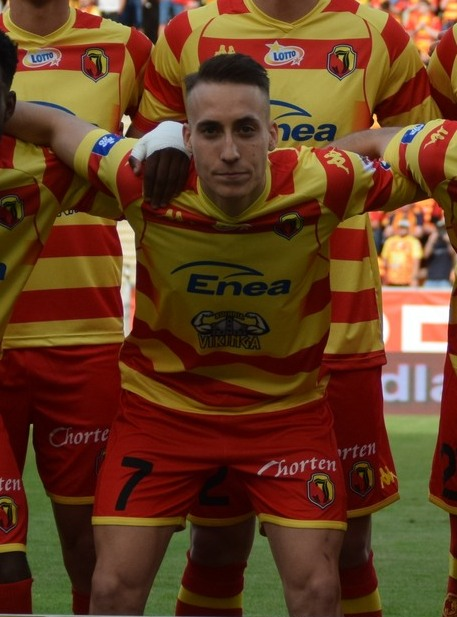
Marczuk in 2024 lining up for Jagiellonia Białystok

In the summer of 2023, he joined Ekstraklasa club Jagiellonia Białystok as a free agent on a three-year deal. He made his debut on 22 July 2023 in a 0–3 loss to Raków Częstochowa. He scored his first goal for the team on 27 August 2023, in a 4–1 win over Górnik Zabrze.

He enjoyed an impressive start to his top division career, which included delivering a hat-trick of assists in a 3–2 comeback home win against Radomiak Radom on 17 September 2023, which saw him voted as player of the round. Marczuk appeared in all 34 league matches during the 2023–24 season, recording six goals and ten assists, as Jagiellonia were crowned champions for the first time in the club's history. At the conclusion of the season, he was voted the Ekstraklasa Young Player of the Season.

=== Real Salt Lake ===
On 14 August 2024, Major League Soccer side Real Salt Lake announced the signing of Marczuk until the end of 2028, after exercising his €1.5 million release clause. He made his debut in his new club in a 2–0 victory over New England Revolution, which took place on 1 September.

==== Loan to FC Cincinnati ====
On 22 August 2025, Marczuk was loaned to Eastern Conference club FC Cincinnati for the remainder of the 2025 season in exchange for a first-round pick in the 2026 MLS SuperDraft. On 26 November, the team announced that Marczuk would return to Real Salt Lake.

== International career ==
Marczuk is a youth international for Poland, having played with the under-19 and under-20 by 2021. He made his debut for the U21s on 12 October 2023 in a 2–2 draw against Slovakia.

He received his first senior team call-up for matches against Estonia and Wales on 21 and 26 March 2024. Eight months later, on 15 November, Marczuk made his full international debut and scored a late consolation goal in a 5–1 away UEFA Nations League defeat against Portugal.

== Career statistics ==
=== Club ===
As of match played 24 October 2026

Appearances and goals by club, season and competition
Club	Season	League			National cup (Note: Includes Polish Cup)		Continental		Other		Total	
Club	Season	Division	Apps	Goals	Apps	Goals	Apps	Goals	Apps	Goals	Apps	Goals
Podlasie Biała Podlaska	2019–20	III liga, group IV	17	0	—		—		—		17	0
Podlasie Biała Podlaska	2020–21	III liga, group IV	2	0	—		—		—		2	0
Podlasie Biała Podlaska	Total		19	0	—		—		—		19	0
Stal Rzeszów	2020–21	II liga	17	0	—		—		—		17	0
Stal Rzeszów	2021–22	II liga	25	3	2	1	—		—		27	4
Stal Rzeszów	2022–23	I liga	18	2	1	0	—		—		19	2
Stal Rzeszów	Total		60	5	3	1	—		—		63	6
Jagiellonia Białystok	2023–24	Ekstraklasa	34	6	5	1	—		—		39	7
Jagiellonia Białystok	2024–25	Ekstraklasa	3	0	0	0	4 (Note: Appearances in UEFA Champions League)	0	—		7	0
Jagiellonia Białystok	Total		37	6	5	1	4	0	—		46	7
Real Salt Lake	2024	Major League Soccer	8	1	0	0	—		2 (Note: Appearances in MLS Cup playoffs)	0	10	1
Real Salt Lake	2025	Major League Soccer	17	1	0	0	2 (Note: Appearances in CONCACAF Champions Cup)	0	2 (Note: Appearances in Leagues Cup)	0	21	1
Real Salt Lake	2026	Major League Soccer	18	2	0	0	—		2	0	20	2
Real Salt Lake	Total		43	4	0	0	2	0	6	0	51	4
FC Cincinnati (loan)	2025	Major League Soccer	5	0	—		—		0	0	5	0
Career total			164	15	8	2	6	0	6	0	184	17

=== International ===
As of match played 14 November 2024

Appearances and goals by national team and year
National team	Year	Apps	Goals
Poland	2024	1	1
Total		1	1

As of match played 14 November 2024
Scores and results list Poland's goal tally first, score column indicates score after each Marczuk goal.

List of international goals scored by Dominik Marczuk
No.	Date	Venue	Opponent	Score	Result	Competition
1	14 November 2024	Estádio do Dragão, Porto, Portugal	Portugal	1–5	1–5	2024–25 UEFA Nations League A

== Honours ==
Stal Rzeszów

- II liga: 2021–22

Jagiellonia Białystok

- Ekstraklasa: 2023–24

Individual

- Ekstraklasa Young Player of the Season: 2023–24
- Ekstraklasa Player of the Month: March 2024
- Ekstraklasa Young Player of the Month: October 2023, March 2024
- Polish Union of Footballers' Ekstraklasa Team of the Season: 2023–24
- Polish Union of Footballers' Ekstraklasa Young Player of the Season: 2023–24
- Polish Union of Footballers' Ekstraklasa Discovery of the Season: 2023–24
