= Snyder Brunell =

American soccer player (born 2007)

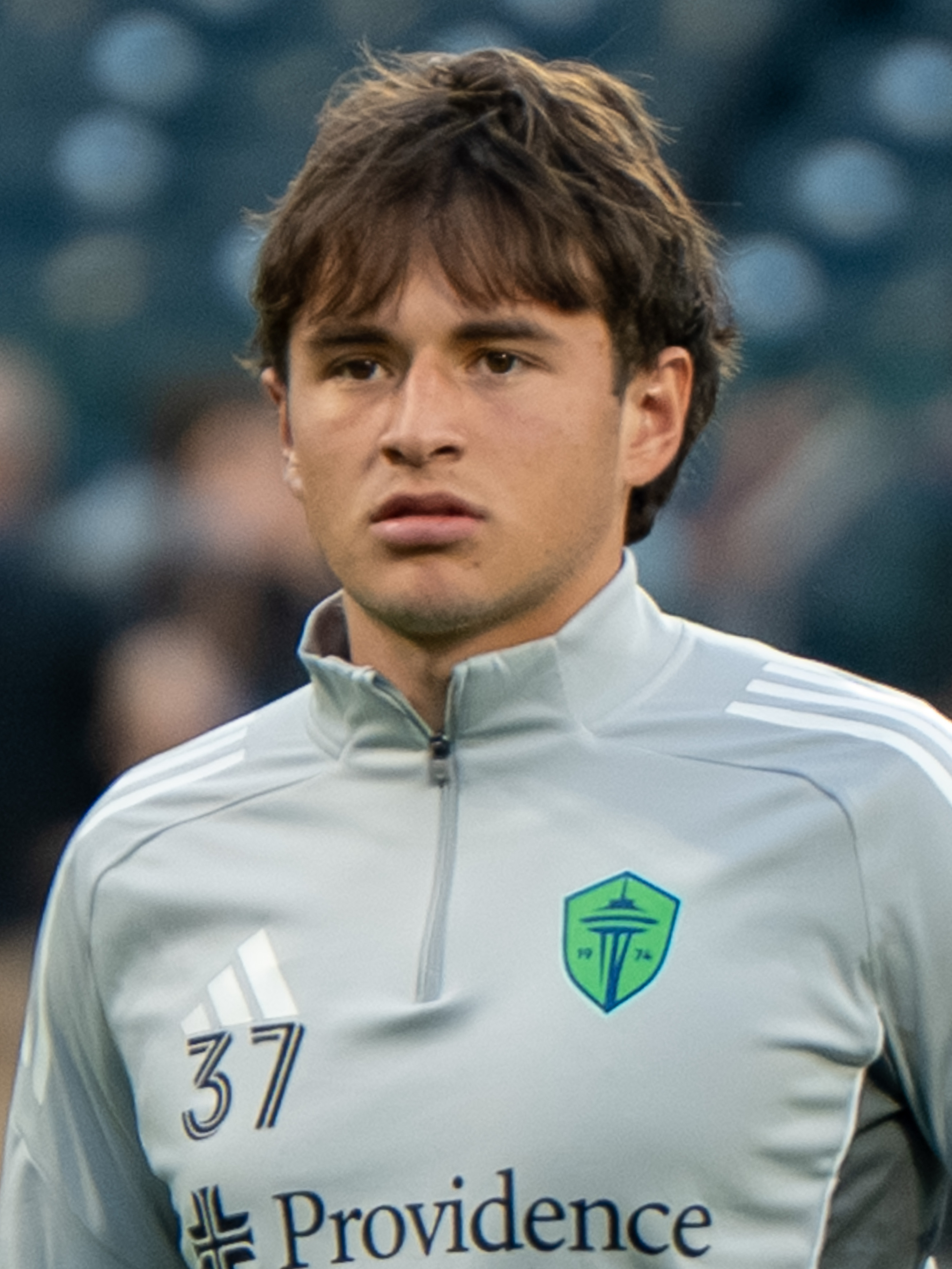
- Brunell with the Seattle Sounders in 2025

Personal information
- Date of birth: March 27, 2007 (age 19)
- Place of birth: Plano, Texas, U.S.
- Height: 1.78 m (5 ft 10 in)
- Position: Midfielder

Team information
- Current team: Seattle Sounders FC
- Number: 37

Youth career
- 2017–2021: Crossfire Premier SC
- 2021–2023: Seattle Sounders FC

Senior career*
Years	Team	Apps	(Gls)
2022–2025	Tacoma Defiance	57	(7)
2024–	Seattle Sounders FC	19	(2)

International career^{‡}
2025–	United States U18	5	(0)
2025–	United States U19	5	(0)
- * Club domestic league appearances and goals as of 17:36, September 18, 2025 (UTC) ‡ National team caps and goals as of November 15, 2025

Snyder Brunell (born March 27, 2007) is an American professional soccer player who plays as a midfielder for Major League Soccer team Seattle Sounders FC.

== Club career ==
Born in Plano, Texas, Brunell moved near Redmond, Washington, at the age of 9 and began playing soccer with the Crossfire Premier academy. He joined Seattle Sounders youth academy in 2021, and in 2023 began playing with their reserve side Tacoma Defiance in the MLS Next Pro. On December 11, 2023, he signed a professional contract with Tacoma Defiance for the 2024 season.

He made his senior and professional debut for Seattle Sounders FC in a 2–1 U.S. Open Cup win over Phoenix Rising on May 23, 2024. On July 29, 2025, he signed a professional contract with the Sounders as a Homegrown Player until 2028, with a club option until 2029. He scored in his Major League Soccer debut, a 4–0 win over LA Galaxy on August 11, 2025. He was on the bench as the Seattle Sounders beat Inter Miami in the 2025 Leagues Cup final on August 31, 2025.

== International career ==
Brunell was born in the United States to an American father and Mexican-American mother. He was first called up to a training camp for the United States U16s in Portland, Oregon, in October 2023. In March 2024, he was called up to play for the United States U17s for a training camp. He was called up to the United States U18s in their winning campaign in the UEFA Friendship Cup in June 2025. He was called up to the United States U19s for a training camp in September 2025.

== Honors ==
Seattle Sounders

- Leagues Cup: 2025 Leagues Cup
