= United States men's national under-18 soccer team =

National under-18 soccer team

United States Under-18
- Nickname(s): The Stars and Stripes; The Yanks
- Association: United States Soccer Federation
- Confederation: CONCACAF
- Sub-confederation: NAFU (North America)
- Head coach: Jeremy Hall
- FIFA code: USA
First colors	Second colors
- Website: ussoccer.com/u-18

The United States U-18 men's national soccer team is controlled by the United States Soccer Federation. The U.S. under-18 men's national team serves as a transition for players between the under-17 and the under-20 national teams. Though the team does not compete in a world championship, it competes in international tournaments and holds several domestic training camps throughout the year.

== Results and schedule ==
The following is a list of match results in the last 12 months, as well as any future matches that have been scheduled.

Legend Win Draw Lose Fixture

=== 2026 ===
March 26 2026 Torneio Internacional de Lisboa	Iceland	1–2	United States	Lisbon, Portugal
7:00 am EDT	Gunnleifsson	Report	Adams; Shaw

March 28 2026 Torneio Internacional de Lisboa	Morocco	2–1	United States	Lisbon, Portugal
2:00 pm EDT	Anane 35'; Benzahra 75'		Hamouda 90+5'	Stadium: Cidade do Futebol; Referee: Sérgio Jesus

March 31 2026 Torneio Internacional de Lisboa	Portugal	1–1	United States	Lisbon, Portugal
9:00 am EDT	Semedo 11'		Preston 89'	Stadium: Cidade do Futebol; Referee: Rui Mónica

== Players ==
=== Current squad ===
20 players were called up for the June 2026 friendlies

Caps and goals are current as of June 10, 2025, after match against Portugal.

No.	Pos.	Player	Date of birth (age)	Caps	Goals	Club
	GK	William Lodmell	February 5, 2008 (age 18)	0	0	(Portuguese Football Federation) Sporting CP Academy
	GK	Graham Syrett	January 21, 2008 (age 18)	0	0	(United States Soccer Federation) Charlotte FC Academy
	GK	Aidan Stokes	January 14, 2008 (age 18)	0	0	(United States Soccer Federation) New York Red Bulls II
	DF	Andrei Chirilă	August 15, 2008 (age 18)	0	0	(United States Soccer Federation) FC Cincinnati 2
	DF	Jordan Griffin	October 25, 2008 (age 17)	0	0	(United States Soccer Federation) Philadelphia Union II
	DF	Jacob Hall	December 9, 2008 (age 17)	0	0	(United States Soccer Federation) Chelsea Academy
	DF	Ryan Hartley	February 13, 2008 (age 18)	0	0	(United States Soccer Federation) Ventura County FC
	DF	Stone Marion	February 8, 2008 (age 18)	0	0	(United States Soccer Federation) St. Louis City 2
	DF	Enrique Martinez	June 12, 2008 (age 18)	0	0	(United States Soccer Federation) Ventura County FC
	DF	Juan Villa	January 3, 2008 (age 18)		0	(United States Soccer Federation) Real Salt Lake Academy
	MF	Máximo Carrizo	February 28, 2008 (age 18)	0	0	(United States Soccer Federation) New York City FC
	FW	Kellan LeBlanc	May 17, 2008 (age 18)	0	0	(United States Soccer Federation) Philadelphia Union II
	FW	Luca Moisa	April 20, 2008 (age 18)	0	0	(United States Soccer Federation) Real Salt Lake
	MF	Alexander Shaw	April 3, 2008 (age 18)	0	0	(United States Soccer Federation) Inter Miami
	MF	Jude Terry	October 8, 2008 (age 17)	0	0	(United States Soccer Federation) LAFC
	MF	Mateo Tsakiris	March 5, 2008 (age 18)	0	0	(United States Soccer Federation) unattached
	MF	Axel Uriostegui	January 28, 2008 (age 18)	2	1	(United States Soccer Federation) Real Salt Lake Academy
	FW	Chase Adams	April 17, 2008 (age 18)	0	0	(United States Soccer Federation) Columbus Crew
	FW	Leo Flores Gonzalez	April 8, 2008 (age 18)	0	0	(United States Soccer Federation) Seattle Sounders Academy
	FW	Jamir Johnson	July 7, 2008 (age 18)	0	0	(United States Soccer Federation) Orange County SC
	FW	Cristiano Oliveira	March 30, 2008 (age 18)	0	0	(United States Soccer Federation) New England Revolution

=== Recent call-ups ===
The following players have been called up in the past 12 months:

- 2026 Torneio Internacional de Lisboa
- January 2026 training camp.

Pos.	Player	Date of birth (age)	Caps	Goals	Club	Latest call-up
GK	William Mackay	March 21, 2008 (age 18)	0	0	(United States) Real Salt Lake Academy	2026 Torneio Internacional de Lisboa
GK	Kendall Starks	March 12, 2008 (age 18)	0	0	(United States) Colorado Rapids 2	January 2026 training camp
DF	Christopher Cupps	May 26, 2008 (age 18)	0	0	(United States) Chicago Fire FC II	2026 Torneio Internacional de Lisboa
DF	Brandon Dayes	December 17, 2008 (age 17)	0	0	(United States) Louisville City	2026 Torneio Internacional de Lisboa
DF	Ramiz Hamouda	May 26, 2008 (age 18)	0	0	(United States) Birmingham Legion FC	2026 Torneio Internacional de Lisboa
DF	Camron Estala	March 18, 2008 (age 18)	0	0	(United States) Real Salt Lake Academy	January 2026 training camp
DF	Micah Harris	February 7, 2008 (age 18)	0	0	(United States) Houston Dynamo Academy	January 2026 training camp
DF	Kruz Held	June 21, 2008 (age 18)	0	0	(United States) Chicago Fire Academy	January 2026 training camp
MF	Cristiano Oliveira	March 30, 2008 (age 18)	0	0	(United States) New England Revolution	2026 Torneio Internacional de Lisboa
MF	Cooper Sanchez	March 26, 2008 (age 18)	0	0	(United States) Atlanta United	2026 Torneio Internacional de Lisboa
MF	Evan Lim	April 5, 2008 (age 18)	0	0	(United States) New York City FC Academy	January 2026 training camp
MF	Logan Moniz	June 1, 2008 (age 18)	0	0	(United States) Boston Bolts	January 2026 training camp
MF	Daniel Nunez	December 4, 2008 (age 17)	0	0	(United States) Portland Timbers 2	January 2026 training camp
MF	Lukas Robbins	June 24, 2008 (age 18)	0	0	(United States) Nashville SC Academy	January 2026 training camp
FW	Nimfasha Berchimas	February 22, 2008 (age 18)	0	0	(United States) Charlotte	2026 Torneio Internacional de Lisboa
FW	Peyton Presson	January 13, 2008 (age 18)	0	0	(Austria) LASK	2026 Torneio Internacional de Lisboa
FW	Eric Preston	January 31, 2008 (age 18)	0	0	(United States) Ventura County	2026 Torneio Internacional de Lisboa
FW	Oliver Tan	April 1, 2008 (age 18)	0	0	(Portugal) Famalicão Academy	2026 Torneio Internacional de Lisboa
FW	Lionel Gitau	March 1, 2008 (age 18)	0	0	(United States) Houston Dynamo FC Academy	January 2026 training camp
FW	Theo Reed	(17)	0	0	(United States) Philadelphia Union Academy	January 2026 training camp

- PRE: Preliminary squad
- ^{INJ} = Injured

== Head coach history ==
- (United States) Mitch Murray (1996–1999)
- (United States) George Gelnovatch (1999–2003)
- (United States) Bob Jenkins (2004–2008)
- (United States) Mike Matkovich (2009–2011)
- (United States) Richie Williams (2011–2012)
- (Spain) Javier Pérez (2012–2015)
- (United States) Omid Namazi (2016–2018)
- (United States) Marlon LeBlanc (2025)
- (United States) Jeremy Hall (2026–)

== Competitive record ==
=== Pan American Games ===
Pan American Games
Year	Host	Result	Pos	Pld	W	D	L	F	A	Squad
1951–1983		See United States men's national soccer team								
1987–1995		See United States men's national under-20 soccer team								
1999–2003		See United States men's national under-23 soccer team								
2007	Brazil	Group stage	7th	3	1	0	2	4	7	Squad
2011—2019		See United States men's national under-23 soccer team								
2023		See United States men's national under-19 soccer team								
Total		—		3	1	0	2	4	7	—

== See also ==
- United States men's national soccer team
- United States men's national under-23 soccer team
- United States men's national under-20 soccer team
- United States men's national under-19 soccer team
- United States men's national under-17 soccer team
