= Griffin Dillon =

American soccer player (born 2003)

Personal information
- Full name: Griffin Dillon
- Date of birth: April 25, 2003 (age 23)
- Place of birth: San Diego, California, United States
- Height: 5 ft 11 in (1.80 m)
- Position: Midfielder

Team information
- Current team: Real Salt Lake
- Number: 27

Youth career
- La Roca FC

College career
| Years | Team | Apps | (Gls) |
| 2021–2022 | Maryland Terrapins | 35 | (3) |

Senior career*
| Years | Team | Apps | (Gls) |
| 2021 | Real Monarchs | 7 | (0) |
| 2023–2025 | Real Monarchs | 72 | (6) |
| 2026– | Real Salt Lake | 0 | (0) |
- * Club domestic league appearances and goals as of February 7, 2026

Griffin Dillon (born April 25, 2003) is an American soccer player who plays as a midfielder for Real Salt Lake in the MLS.

== Club career ==
Born in San Diego, California, Dillon began his career with La Roca Football Club, a youth development club side in his home state. At one point, Dillon was La Roca's captain. In December 2020, Dillon committed verbally that he would attend the University of Maryland and play college soccer with the Maryland Terrapins as part of their incoming class of 2021. In 2021, Dillon joined Real Monarchs, the USL Championship side of Major League Soccer club Real Salt Lake. He made his senior debut for the club on May 14, 2021, against LA Galaxy II, coming on as a halftime substitute during a 2–0 defeat.

On February 2, 2023, Dillon left college after two seasons to re-join Real Monarchs.

On January 9, 2026, Dillon signed a first team contract with Real Salt Lake.

== Career statistics ==
As of match played October 7, 2021

Appearances and goals by club, season and competition
| Club | Season | League | | | National Cup | | Continental | | Total | |
| Club | Season | Division | Apps | Goals | Apps | Goals | Apps | Goals | Apps | Goals |
|---|---|---|---|---|---|---|---|---|---|---|
| Real Monarchs | 2021 | USL Championship | 7 | 0 | — | | — | | 7 | 0 |
| Career total | | | 7 | 0 | 0 | 0 | 0 | 0 | 7 | 0 |

== Personal ==
Dillon has two brothers, one who is currently playing and father who played college soccer. His brother Trevor plays for Utah Tech University while his father Mark played for the Marquette Golden Eagles.
