= Sergi Solans =

Spanish footballer (born 2003)

Personal information
- Full name: Sergi Solans Ormo
- Date of birth: 26 February 2003 (age 23)
- Place of birth: Lleida, Spain
- Height: 1.85 m (6 ft 1 in)
- Position: Forward

Team information
- Current team: Real Salt Lake
- Number: 22

Youth career
- –2022: Girona

College career
Years	Team	Apps	(Gls)
2024	Oregon State Beavers	16	(14)
2025	UCLA Bruins	19	(16)

Senior career*
Years	Team	Apps	(Gls)
2022–2024	Girona B	17	(3)
2022–2023	→ Peralada (loan)	25	(11)
2024	Lane United	4	(1)
2025	Asheville City	4	(0)
2026–	Real Salt Lake	19	(9)
- * Club domestic league appearances and goals as of 09:47, 20 August 2026 (UTC)

Sergi Solans Ormo (born 26 February 2003) is a Spanish professional footballer who plays as a forward for Real Salt Lake.

== Early life ==
Solans was born on 26 February 2003. Born in Lleida, Spain, he is a native of the city. Growing up, he attended Oregon State University in the United States. Following his stint there, he attended the University of California, Los Angeles in the United States.

== Career ==
As a youth player, Solans joined the youth academy of Spanish side Girona FC. During the summer of 2022, he was loaned to CF Peralada.

Subsequently, he signed for American side Lane United FC in 2024, before signing for American side Asheville City SC in 2025. Ahead of the 2026 season, he signed for American side Real Salt Lake.

== Style of play ==
Solans plays as a forward. Spanish newspaper Diario AS wrote in 2026 that he "stands at 1.83 meters tall, with mobility in attack and a proven goal-scoring record".
