= Chase Adams =

American soccer player (born 2008)

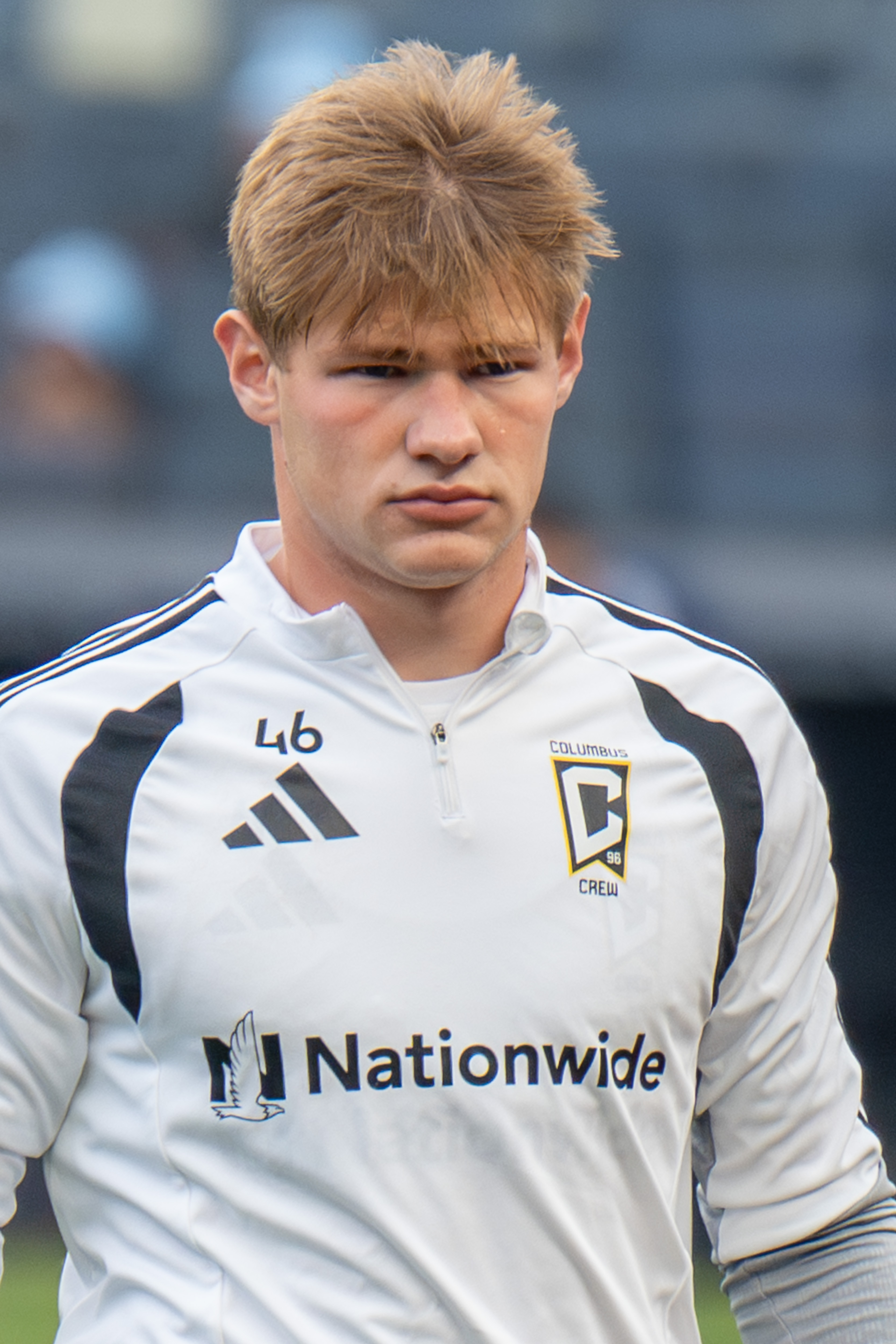
- Adams with Columbus Crew in 2026

Personal information
- Full name: Chase Mesner Adams
- Date of birth: April 17, 2008 (age 18)
- Place of birth: Naperville, Illinois, U.S.
- Height: 5 ft 11 in (1.80 m)
- Position: Forward

Team information
- Current team: Columbus Crew
- Number: 46

Youth career
- –2023: Galaxy SC
- 2023–2024: Columbus Crew

Senior career*
Years	Team	Apps	(Gls)
2024–	Columbus Crew 2	41	(18)
2026–	Columbus Crew	4	(1)

International career^{‡}
2023	United States U15	6	(5)
2024	United States U16	2	(0)
2024–	United States U17	5	(11)
- * Club domestic league appearances and goals as of 03:15, 16 August 2026 (UTC) ‡ National team caps and goals as of February 11, 2025

Chase Mesner Adams (born April 17, 2008) is an American professional soccer player who plays as a forward for Major League Soccer club Columbus Crew.

== Early life ==
Adams was born on April 17, 2008, in Naperville, Illinois. Adams attended Naperville Central High School in Illinois, where he played on the soccer team, helping them win their first state title.

== Club career ==
As a youth player, Adams played for local club Galaxy SC before joining the Columbus Crew Academy, and was promoted to the club's reserve team in 2024. During his first season with the reserves, he made nineteen league appearances and scored 9 goals. He helped the team make a semi-final playoff run contributing one goal in three playoff appearances.

On January 7, 2026, it was announced that Adams had signed a first-team contract with the Crew.

== International career ==
Adams is a United States youth international. During the summer of 2023, he helped the United States boys' national under-15 soccer team win the 2023 CONCACAF Boys' Under-15 Championship. On February 10, 2025, Adams scored 10 goals for the United States U17's against the U.S. Virgin Islands in a 22–0 win.
