= Nelson Palacio =

Colombian footballer (born 2001)

Personal information
- Full name: Nelson Daniel Palacio Ruiz
- Date of birth: 16 June 2001 (age 25)
- Place of birth: Apartadó, Colombia
- Height: 1.80 m (5 ft 11 in)
- Position: Midfielder

Team information
- Current team: Toronto FC
- Number: 8

Youth career
- 2007–2020: Atlético Nacional

Senior career*
Years	Team	Apps	(Gls)
2020–2023	Atlético Nacional	71	(2)
2020–2021	→ Valledupar (loan)	34	(0)
2023–2026	Real Salt Lake	44	(1)
2023	→ Real Monarchs	3	(0)
2025–2026	→ FC Zürich (loan)	32	(0)
2026–	Toronto FC	0	(0)

International career
2023	Colombia	1	(0)
- * Club domestic league appearances and goals as of 26 May 2026

Nelson Daniel Palacio Ruiz (born 16 June 2001) is a Colombian professional footballer who plays as a midfielder for Major League Soccer club Toronto FC. He has also played for the Colombia national team.

== Club career ==
Palacio is a youth product of Atlético Nacional since the age of 6, and worked his way up their youth categories. He began his senior career on loan with Valledupar in the Categoría Primera B from 2020 to 2021. He returned to Atlético Nacional in 2021, eventually helping them win a Copa Colombia, Categoría Primera A and Superliga Colombiana.

== International career ==
Palacio was called up to the Colombia national team for a set of friendlies in March 2023. He made his debut with Colombia as a late substitute in a 2–2 friendly tie with South Korea on 24 March 2023.

== Honours ==
Atlético Nacional

- Copa Colombia: 2021
- Categoría Primera A: 2022 Apertura
- Superliga Colombiana: 2023
