= Aiden Hezarkhani =

American soccer player (born 2007)

Personal information
- Full name: Aiden Hezarkhani
- Date of birth: June 28, 2007 (age 19)
- Place of birth: Irvine, California, United States
- Height: 5 ft 10 in (1.77 m)
- Position: Midfielder

Team information
- Current team: Real Salt Lake
- Number: 39

Youth career
- 2022–2023: Irvine Strikers
- 2023–2024: Real Salt Lake

Senior career*
Years	Team	Apps	(Gls)
2024–	Real Monarchs	37	(8)
2025–	Real Salt Lake	15	(2)

International career^{‡}
2024–	United States U18	3	(1)
- * Club domestic league appearances and goals as of June 9, 2026 ‡ National team caps and goals as of June 9, 2026

Aiden Hezarkhani (born June 28, 2007) is an American professional soccer player who plays as a midfielder for Major League Soccer club Real Salt Lake.

== Club career ==
Born in Irvine, California, Hezarkhani began his career with local club Irvine Strikers FC, before joining the RSL Academy in 2024. Hezarkhani signed his first professional contract with MLS Next Pro side Real Monarchs on July 20, 2024, having made his professional debut on April 28, 2024, against Vancouver Whitecaps 2.

On January 16, 2025, ahead of the 2025 season, Real Salt Lake announced the signing of Hezarkhani on an MLS contract. He made his first appearance for RSL in a 2–0 loss to the LA Galaxy on May 31, 2025, before getting his first start for the club on February 21, 2026, in the club's 2026 season opener at the Vancouver Whitecaps. Hezarkhani would score his first career goal for the club on February 28, in a 2–1 home win over Seattle Sounders FC.

== International career ==
In September 2024, Hezarkhani was called up to the United States men's national under-18 soccer team for a youth tournament in Niigata, Japan. In March 2026, Hezarkhani was called up for the U.S. U-19 training camp in Alicante, Spain. In May 2026, he was called up for the U.S. U-19 training camp in Atlanta.

== Career statistics ==
As of match played May 23, 2026

Appearances and goals by club, season and competition
Club	Season	League			National Cup		Continental		Total	
Club	Season	Division	Apps	Goals	Apps	Goals	Apps	Goals	Apps	Goals
Real Monarchs	2024	MLS Next Pro	15	2	—		—		15	2
Real Monarchs	2025	MLS Next Pro	22	6	—		—		22	6
Real Salt Lake	2025	Major League Soccer	2	0	—		—		2	0
Real Salt Lake	2026	Major League Soccer	13	2	—		—		13	2
Career total			52	10	0	0	0	0	52	10
