= Noel Caliskan =

German footballer (born 2000)

Personal information
- Date of birth: 29 August 2000 (age 26)
- Place of birth: Cologne, Germany
- Height: 5 ft 11 in (1.80 m)
- Position: Midfielder

Team information
- Current team: Real Salt Lake
- Number: 92

Youth career
- 2012–2017: 1. FC Köln
- 2017–2019: Fortuna Düsseldorf

College career
Years	Team	Apps	(Gls)
2019–2022	Loyola Marymount Lions	65	(9)

Senior career*
Years	Team	Apps	(Gls)
2020	SpVg Frechen 20	5	(2)
2021	Flint City Bucks	4	(1)
2023	Portland Timbers 2	6	(3)
2023	Portland Timbers	4	(0)
2024–2025	Real Monarchs	24	(2)
2024–	Real Salt Lake	52	(2)
- * Club domestic league appearances and goals as of 5 September 2026

Noel Caliskan (Turkish: Çalışkan; born 29 August 2000) is a German professional footballer who plays as a midfielder for Major League Soccer club Real Salt Lake.

== Youth, college and amateur career ==
At the youth level, Caliskan played with the academy team of 1. FC Köln between 2012 and 2017, before spending two seasons with the youth team of Fortuna Düsseldorf between 2017 and 2019. In 2019, Caliskan moved to the United States to play college soccer at Loyola Marymount University in Los Angeles. In four seasons with the Lions, Caliskan registered nine goals and 13 assists in 65 appearances. He also received numerous honors, including West Coast Conference Midfielder of the Year in back-to-back seasons in 2021 and 2022, WCC Offensive Player of the Year in 2021, WCC Player of the Year in 2020, WCC Freshman of the Year in 2019, and was a MAC Hermann Trophy semifinalist following his junior season. Caliskan was named to the All-WCC First Team in his last three seasons with the Lions and was honored on the All-WCC Second Team his freshman year.

In the summer of 2020, Caliskan returned to Germany to compete with amateur side SpVG Frechen 20, who played in the Mittelrheinliga. During the summer of 2021, Caliskan remained in the United States and made four appearances for USL League Two side Flint City Bucks.

== Professional career ==
On 21 December 2022, Caliskan was selected 15th overall in the 2023 MLS SuperDraft by Portland Timbers. On 2 March 2023, Caliskan signed with Portland's MLS Next Pro side Portland Timbers 2. After netting three goals in four appearances for Timbers 2, Caliskan joined the club's first team roster on a short-term deal. He then subsequently signed a permanent deal with the Major League Soccer side on 28 April 2023. Caliskan was released by Portland following their 2023 season.

On 21 February 2024, Caliskan signed with Real Monarchs of MLS Next Pro. He was immediately signed on a short-term deal to Real Salt Lake's roster for their fixture against Inter Miami CF on the same day, where he appeared as a 73rd-minute substitute.

== Personal life ==
Noel's father was Mahmut Caliskan who was a Turkish professional footballer.
