= Luca Moisa =

American soccer player (born 2008)

Personal information
- Date of birth: 20 April 2008 (age 18)
- Place of birth: Las Vegas, Nevada, United States
- Height: 5 ft 9 in (1.75 m)
- Position: Central midfielder

Team information
- Current team: Real Salt Lake
- Number: 34

Youth career
- –2021: Heat FC
- 2021–2022: Real Salt Lake

Senior career*
Years	Team	Apps	(Gls)
2022–	Real Monarchs	52	(2)
2024–	Real Salt Lake	5	(0)

International career
2023	United States U15	6	(2)
2024	United States U16	2	(1)
2024–2025	United States U17	10	(0)
2026–	United States U18		
- * Club domestic league appearances and goals as of 6 September 2026

Luca Moisa (born 20 April 2008) is an American professional soccer player who plays as a central midfielder for Major League Soccer club Real Salt Lake.

== Honours ==
United States U15

- CONCACAF Boys' Under-15 Championship: 2023
