= Philip Quinton =

American soccer player (born 1999)

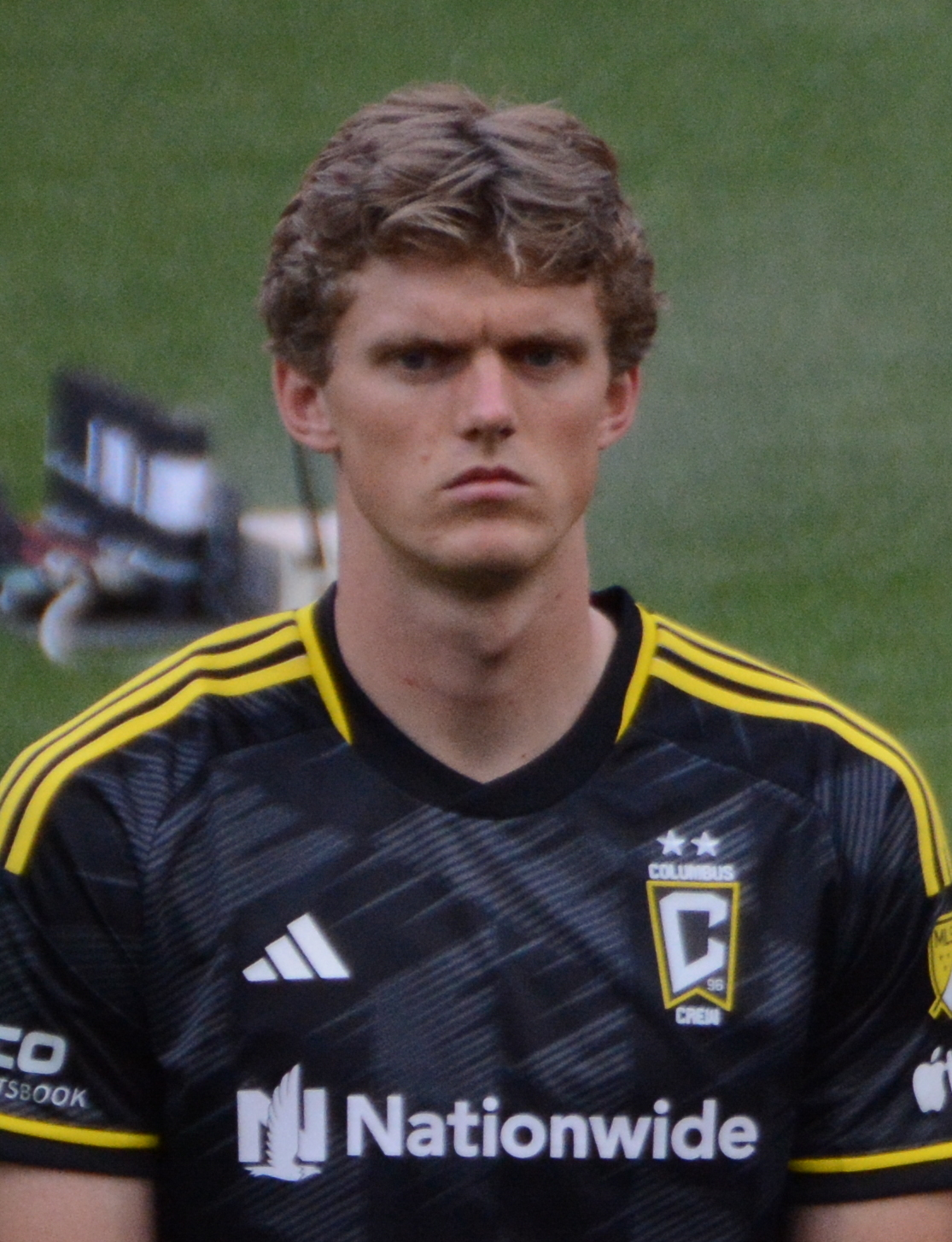
- Quinton with Columbus Crew in 2023

Personal information
- Full name: Philip Kane Quinton
- Date of birth: November 16, 1999 (age 27)
- Place of birth: Columbus, Ohio, United States
- Height: 1.96 m (6 ft 5 in)
- Position: Defender

Team information
- Current team: Real Salt Lake
- Number: 26

Youth career
- –2018: FC Portland

College career
Years	Team	Apps	(Gls)
2018–2021	Notre Dame Fighting Irish	58	(2)

Senior career*
Years	Team	Apps	(Gls)
2021	Portland Timbers U23s	1	(0)
2022–2024	Columbus Crew 2	28	(0)
2023–2024	Columbus Crew	13	(1)
2024–	Real Salt Lake	60	(1)
2025	→ Real Monarchs	1	(0)
- * Club domestic league appearances and goals as of 02:06, 19 October 2026 (UTC)

Philip Kane Quinton (born November 16, 1999) is an American professional soccer player who plays as a defender for Real Salt Lake in Major League Soccer.

== Early years ==
=== Youth ===
Born in Columbus, Ohio, Quinton grew up in Portland, Oregon, attending Grant High School. At high school, Quinton was team captain of the team along with co-captain, Eli Roberts as they went on to be state semifinalists, earning First-Team All-Conference and Second-Team All-State accolades in his senior year, as well been named a letterwinner.

Whilst at high school, Quinton also played club soccer at the FC Portland academy, helping the club to be State Cup champions in 2013, State Cup finalists in 2012 and 2014 and State Cup semifinalists in both 2016 and 2017.

=== College ===
In 2018, Quinton committed to playing college soccer at the University of Notre Dame, choosing Notre Dame over Dartmouth College. In four seasons with the Fighting Irish, Quinton made 58 appearances, scoring two goals and adding two assists.

During his college career, he was a four-time ACC Honor Roll, CoSIDA Second Team Academic All-American, 2021 ACC All-Tournament Team, and 2021 All-ACC Third Team. While at college, Quinton made a single appearance for Portland Timbers U23s during their 2021 season in the USL League Two.

== Club career ==
On January 11, 2022, Quinton was selected 25th overall in the 2022 MLS SuperDraft by Columbus Crew, who traded $50,000 of General Allocation Money to acquire the pick from Real Salt Lake.

On March 17, 2022, Quinton signed a professional deal with MLS Next Pro side Columbus Crew 2 ahead of their inaugural season.

On April 19, 2022, Quinton signed a short-team deal with Columbus' Major League Soccer team ahead of their Lamar Hunt U.S. Open Cup fixture against Detroit City, where he appeared on the bench. Following the 2022 season, he was released by Columbus. However, in February 2023, Quinton re-signed with Columbus Crew on an MLS contract. Quinton scored his first professional goal on March 25, 2023, in a 6–1 victory versus Atlanta United.

On April 19, 2024, Quinton was traded to Real Salt Lake in exchange for a deal worth up to $200,000 in General Allocation Money.

== Personal life ==
Quinton's older brother Pieter is an Olympic rower and won a bronze medal in the Men's Eight for Team USA at the 2024 Summer Olympics in Paris, France.

== Honors ==
Columbus Crew 2

- MLS Next Pro: 2022

Columbus Crew

- MLS Cup: 2023
