= 2020 Tacoma Defiance season =

Tacoma Defiance
2020 season
- Head coach: Wade Webber
- Stadium: Cheney Stadium
- USL Championship: Group A: 3rd
- USL Playoffs: Did not qualify
- Top goalscorer: League: Alec Díaz; All: Alec Díaz
- Highest home attendance: League: 2,178 (March 3 vs. RNO)
- Lowest home attendance: League:
- Average home league attendance: League: 2,178
- Biggest win: POR 0–4 TAC (Aug. 3)
- Biggest defeat: POR 3–0 TAC (Sept. 9)
| Home colors | Away colors |

The 2020 Tacoma Defiance season was the club's sixth year of existence, formerly as Seattle Sounders FC 2, and their sixth season in the USL Championship, the second tier of the United States Soccer Pyramid. It was their third season in Tacoma, Washington. The Defiance are majority owned by Seattle Sounders FC.

== Roster ==
Note: Flags indicate national team as defined under FIFA eligibility rules; some limited exceptions apply. Players may hold more than one non-FIFA nationality. Squad correct as of December 15, 2020.

| No. | Pos. | Nation | Player |
|---|---|---|---|
| 1 | GK | USA | Trey Muse |
| 16 | DF | USA | Alex Roldan |
| 31 | GK | USA | Christian Herrera |
| 32 | FW | PUR | Alec Díaz |
| 33 | DF | USA | Sam Rogers |
| 34 | FW | USA | Danny Robles |
| 37 | FW | USA | Shandon Hopeau |
| 38 | MF | USA | Azriel Gonzalez |
| 39 | MF | USA | Marlon Vargas |
| 40 | MF | USA | Chris Hegardt |
| 42 | MF | USA | Alex Villanueva |
| 43 | MF | USA | Sota Kitahara |
| 45 | MF | USA | Ethan Dobbelaere ( on loan from Seattle Sounders FC) |
| 48 | DF | USA | Joshua Hardin |
| 49 | MF | USA | Reed Baker-Whiting |
| 52 | DF | USA | Eric Kinzner |
| 61 | GK | USA | Jamie Lowell |
| 74 | DF | USA | Taylor Mueller |
| 75 | MF | USA | Danny Leyva |
| 80 | MF | USA | Ray Serrano |
| 81 | DF | ENG | Danny Reynolds |
| 84 | MF | USA | Josh Atencio |
| 87 | FW | USA | Alfonso Ocampo-Chavez ( on loan from Seattle Sounders FC) |
| 90 | MF | USA | Chino Pérez |
| 92 | DF | FRA | Abdoulaye Cissoko |
| 97 | MF | USA | Collin Fernandez |
| 98 | MF | ENG | Antonee Burke-Gilroy |
| 99 | FW | USA | Justin Dhillon |

1. Signed to first team contract with Sounders FC.
2. Sounders FC Academy player.

== Competitions ==
=== Preseason ===
| February 6, 2020 | Vancouver Whitecaps FC | 4–0 | Tacoma Defiance |
| (PDT) |
Note: closed door 114 min match

| February 12, 2020 | LA Galaxy II | – | Tacoma Defiance | Carson, California |
| (PDT) | | | | Stadium: Dignity Health Sports Park |

=== Friendlies ===
| | – |
| (PDT) |

=== USL regular season ===
==== Standings — Group A ====
| Pos | Team | Pld | W | D | L | GF | GA | GD | Pts | PPG | Qualification |
|---|---|---|---|---|---|---|---|---|---|---|---|
| 1 | Reno 1868 FC | 16 | 11 | 3 | 2 | 43 | 21 | +22 | 36 | 2.25 | Advance to USL Championship Playoffs |
| 2 | Sacramento Republic FC | 16 | 8 | 6 | 2 | 27 | 17 | +10 | 30 | 1.88 | Advance to USL Championship Playoffs |
| 3 | Tacoma Defiance | 16 | 4 | 2 | 10 | 25 | 32 | −7 | 14 | 0.88 | |
| 4 | Portland Timbers 2 | 16 | 3 | 0 | 13 | 20 | 50 | −30 | 9 | 0.56 | |

Source: USL

==== Results summary ====
| Overall | | | | | | | | Home | | | | | | Away | | | | | |
| Pld | W | D | L | GF | GA | GD | Pts | W | D | L | GF | GA | GD | W | D | L | GF | GA | GD |
|---|---|---|---|---|---|---|---|---|---|---|---|---|---|---|---|---|---|---|---|
| 16 | 4 | 2 | 10 | 25 | 32 | −7 | 14 | 3 | 0 | 3 | 9 | 8 | +1 | 1 | 2 | 7 | 16 | 24 | −8 |

Last updated: October 3, 2020.
Source: USL Championship

==== Results by matchday ====
| Matchday | 1 | 2 | 3 | 4 | 5 | 6 | 7 | 8 | 9 | 10 | 11 | 12 | 13 | 14 | 15 | 16 |
|---|---|---|---|---|---|---|---|---|---|---|---|---|---|---|---|---|
| Stadium | H | H | A | H | A | A | A | A | A | A | A | A | A | H | H | H |
| Result | L | L | D | W | W | L | L | L | L | L | L | D | L | W | W | L |

A = Away; H = Home; W = Win; D = Draw; L = Loss

==== Matches ====
Win Draw Loss Upcoming fixture

| March 6, 2020 USL 1 | Tacoma Defiance | 1–3 | Reno 1868 FC | Tacoma, Washington |
| 7:00 p.m. (PST) | Hegardt 26'; Daley (yellow card) 38'; Atencio (yellow card) 86' | Report | Skahan 56'; François 74'; Fuentes 87' | Stadium: Cheney Stadium; Attendance: 2,178; Referee: Ismir Pekmic |

| March 11, 2020 USL 2 | Tacoma Defiance | 1–2 | San Diego Loyal SC | Tacoma, Washington |
| 7:00 p.m. (PDT) | Mueller (yellow card) 38'; Dhillon 56' | Report | Atuahene 31', 85', (yellow card) 89'; Stoneman (yellow card) 57'; Kempin (yellow card) 90+2' | Stadium: Cheney Stadium; Attendance: 0 Referee: Luis Guardia |
Note: Played behind closed doors due to the coronavirus pandemic.

| July 13, 2020 USL 3 | Sacramento Republic FC | 3–3 | Tacoma Defiance | Sacramento, California |
| 7:00 p.m. (PDT) | Formella 8' (pen.), 37'; Hillard-Arce 23'; Villareal (yellow card) 84'; Skundrich (yellow card) 90+1' | Report | Díaz 1'; Daley 57'; Serrano 81' | Stadium: Papa Murphy's Park; Referee: Elijio Arreguin |

| July 18, 2020 USL 4 | Tacoma Defiance | 3–0 | Portland Timbers 2 | Tacoma, Washington |
| 7:00 p.m. (PDT) | Díaz 14'; Kitahara (yellow card) 21'; Burke-Gilroy (yellow card) 52'; Robles 58'; Reynolds (yellow card) 60'; Pérez 64'; Baker-Whiting (yellow card) 80' | Report | Ornstil (yellow card) 45'; Velásquez (yellow card) 60'; Krolicki (yellow card) 60'; Clapier (yellow card) 74' | Stadium: Cheney Stadium; Referee: Adorae Monroy |

| August 3, 2020 USL 5 | Portland Timbers 2 | 0–4 | Tacoma Defiance | Portland, Oregon |
| 6:00 p.m. (PDT) | Dúran (yellow card) 30'; Anguiano (yellow card) 45'; Calixtro (yellow card) 73' | Report | Díaz 23', 47'; Mueller 40', (yellow card) 53'; Daley (yellow card) 70'; Pérez 72'; Ocampo-Chavez (yellow card) 90' | Stadium: Providence Park; Referee: Isaiah Vlad |

| August 8, 2020 USL 6 | Reno 1868 FC | 2–1 | Tacoma Defiance | Reno, Nevada |
| 7:30 p.m. (PDT) | Kikanovic 20'; Hertzog 32' (pen.), (yellow card) 32'; Rivas (yellow card) 48'; Ycaza (yellow card) 90+3' | Report | Robles 24'; Herrera (yellow card) 31'; Cissoko (yellow card) 40' | Stadium: Greater Nevada Field; Referee: Nicholas Marin |

| August 15, 2020 USL 7 | Sacramento Republic FC | 3–1 | Tacoma Defiance | Sacramento, California |
| 8:00 p.m. (PDT) | Formella 14', 41'; Iwasa 33'; Belmar (yellow card) 54'; McCrary (yellow card) 84' | Report | Hinds (yellow card) 42'; Rogers 50' | Stadium: Papa Murphy's Park; Referee: Ricardo Fierro |

| August 19, 2020 USL 8 | Las Vegas Lights FC | 3–1 | Tacoma Defiance | Las Vegas, Nevada |
| 7:30 p.m. (PDT) | Burgos 19'; Dally 30'; Sandoval 67' | Report | Cissoko (yellow card) 68'; Gonzalez 84' | Stadium: Cashman Field; Referee: Karen Callado |
Note: This match was originally scheduled for 8/12 but was moved due to COVID cases on the Lights squad

| September 4, 2020 USL 10 | Real Monarchs SLC | 1–0 | Tacoma Defiance | Herriman, Utah |
| 7:00 p.m. (PDT) | Arriaga 26'; Davis (yellow card) 90+6' | Report | | Stadium: Zions Bank Stadium; Referee: Brandon Stevis |

| September 9, 2020 USL 9 | Portland Timbers 2 | 3–0 | Tacoma Defiance | Portland, Oregon |
| 7:00 p.m. (PDT) | Gonzalez 18', 24'; Calixtro 21' (pen.); Ornstil (yellow card) 80' | Report | Fernandez (yellow card) 68' | Stadium: Providence Park; Referee: Baboucarr Jallow |
Note: A covered person within the Portland Timbers 2 organization has shown symptoms for COVID-19 so the match has been postponed. Match rescheduled from 8/30 to 9/9.

| September 17, 2020 USL 12 | Reno 1868 FC | 3–2 | Tacoma Defiance | Reno, Nevada |
| 6:30 p.m. (PDT) | Gleadle 5'; Hertzog (yellow card) 19'; Ycaza 52'; Langsdorf 57' | Report | Kinzner (yellow card) 37'; Serrano (yellow card) 40', (goal) 75'; Kitahara (yellow card) 47'; Cissoko 56'; Hegardt (yellow card) 65'; Gonzalez (yellow card) 90' | Stadium: Greater Nevada Field; Referee: Joseph Salinas |
Note: Due to positive COVID-19 tests in the Reno squad this match was moved from October 3. Due to a positive test in the Defiance squad the matched was moved from 9/16.

| September 20, 2020 USL 13 | Sacramento Republic FC | 3–3 | Tacoma Defiance | Sacramento, California |
| 7:30 p.m. (PDT) | Keinan (yellow card) 45+4'; Bijev 48'; Skundrich (yellow card) 56'; Belmar 60' (pen.); López 90'; Sargis (yellow card) 90+4' | Report | Pérez 3'; Kitahara (yellow card) 15'; Díaz 66', (yellow card) 80'; Serrano 86' | Stadium: Papa Murphy's Park; Referee: Nicholas Marin |
Note: Due to a positive COVID-19 test in the Defiance organization the match was moved from 9/19.

| September 24, 2020 USL 11 | Portland Timbers 2 | 3–1 | Tacoma Defiance | Portland, Oregon |
| 7:00 p.m. (PDT) | González Asensi 12', 75' (pen.); Hanson (yellow card) 35'; Epps 49' | Report | Robles 47' | Stadium: Providence Park; Referee: Baboucarr Jallow |
Note: Match rescheduled from September 12 due to air quality issues in the Pacific Northwest.

| September 27, 2020 USL 14 | Tacoma Defiance | 2–1 | Portland Timbers 2 | Tacoma, Washington |
| 1:30 p.m. (PDT) | Dobbelaere 28'; Hegardt (yellow card) 76'; Gonzalez 85' | Report | Anguiano (yellow card) 43'; Velásquez (yellow card) 45+1'; Hanson (yellow card) 62'; Stanley (yellow card) 71'; Gonzalez 87' (o.g.) | Stadium: Cheney Stadium; Referee: Farhad Dadkho |

| September 30, 2020 USL 15 | Tacoma Defiance | 1–0 | Sacramento Republic FC | Tacoma, Washington |
| 7:00 p.m. (PDT) | Mueller (yellow card) 66'; Díaz 71', (yellow card) 90+4' | Report | Chavez (yellow card) 42'; Penagos (yellow card) 90' | Stadium: Cheney Stadium; Referee: Brandon Stevis |

| October 3, 2020 USL 16 | Tacoma Defiance | 1–2 | Reno 1868 FC | Tacoma, Washington |
| 7:00 p.m. (PDT) | Ocampo-Chavez 16'; Robles (yellow card) 89' | Report | Richards 35'; Langsdorf 62'; Partida (yellow card) 89'; Rivas (yellow card) 90+1' | Stadium: Cheney Stadium; Referee: Farhad Dadkho |
Note: Originally schedule as a match in Tacoma on 7/23 that match was postponed due to positive COVID-19 tests in the Reno squad and then move/switch with the away match with Reno.

=== U.S. Open Cup ===
Due to their ownership by a higher division professional club (Seattle Sounders FC), Tacoma is one of 15 teams expressly forbidden from entering the Cup competition.

== Statistics ==
=== Appearances and goals ===
Numbers after plus-sign(+) denote appearances as a substitute.

| No. | Pos | Nat | Player | Total | | Regular season | | Playoffs | |
| No. | Pos | Nat | Player | Apps | Goals | Apps | Goals | Apps | Goals |
|---|---|---|---|---|---|---|---|---|---|
| 1 | GK | (United States) USA | Trey Muse | 2 | 0 | 2 | 0 | 0 | 0 |
| 16 | DF | (United States) USA | Alex Roldan | 1 | 0 | 1 | 0 | 0 | 0 |
| 31 | DF | (United States) USA | Nick Hinds | 7 | 0 | 6+1 | 0 | 0 | 0 |
| 32 | FW | (Puerto Rico) PUR | Alec Díaz | 12 | 5 | 9+3 | 5 | 0 | 0 |
| 33 | DF | (United States) USA | Sam Rogers | 8 | 1 | 8 | 1 | 0 | 0 |
| 34 | MF | (United States) USA | Danny Robles | 13 | 3 | 11+2 | 3 | 0 | 0 |
| 37 | FW | (United States) USA | Shandon Hopeau | 2 | 0 | 2 | 0 | 0 | 0 |
| 38 | MF | (United States) USA | Azriel Gonzalez | 15 | 2 | 7+8 | 2 | 0 | 0 |
| 39 | MF | (United States) USA | Marlon Vargas | 14 | 0 | 9+5 | 0 | 0 | 0 |
| 40 | MF | (United States) USA | Chris Hegardt | 10 | 1 | 5+5 | 1 | 0 | 0 |
| 42 | DF | (United States) USA | Alex Villanueva | 8 | 0 | 5+3 | 0 | 0 | 0 |
| 43 | MF | (United States) USA | Sota Kitahara | 13 | 0 | 12+1 | 0 | 0 | 0 |
| 45 | MF | (United States) USA | Ethan Dobbelaere | 5 | 1 | 4+1 | 1 | 0 | 0 |
| 48 | DF | (United States) USA | Joshua Hardin | 1 | 0 | 0+1 | 0 | 0 | 0 |
| 49 | MF | (United States) USA | Reed Baker-Whiting | 7 | 0 | 3+4 | 0 | 0 | 0 |
| 52 | DF | (United States) USA | Eric Kinzner | 2 | 0 | 2 | 0 | 0 | 0 |
| 60 | GK | (United States) USA | Conrad Lee | 0 | 0 | 0 | 0 | 0 | 0 |
| 64 | GK | (United States) USA | Christian Herrera | 6 | 0 | 6 | 0 | 0 | 0 |
| 65 | GK | (United States) USA | Eric Klenofsky | 7 | 0 | 7 | 0 | 0 | 0 |
| 74 | DF | (United States) USA | Taylor Mueller | 14 | 1 | 14 | 1 | 0 | 0 |
| 75 | MF | (United States) USA | Danny Leyva | 1 | 0 | 1 | 0 | 0 | 0 |
| 80 | MF | (United States) USA | Ray Serrano | 12 | 3 | 5+7 | 3 | 0 | 0 |
| 81 | DF | (England) ENG | Danny Reynolds | 11 | 0 | 6+5 | 0 | 0 | 0 |
| 84 | MF | (United States) USA | Josh Atencio | 2 | 0 | 2 | 0 | 0 | 0 |
| 87 | MF | (United States) USA | Alfonso Ocampo-Chavez | 12 | 1 | 6+6 | 1 | 0 | 0 |
| 89 | MF | (Australia) AUS | Jesse Daley | 4 | 1 | 4 | 1 | 0 | 0 |
| 90 | MF | (United States) USA | Jesús Pérez | 13 | 3 | 4+9 | 3 | 0 | 0 |
| 92 | DF | (France) FRA | Abdoulaye Cissoko | 11 | 1 | 8+3 | 1 | 0 | 0 |
| 97 | MF | (United States) USA | Collin Fernandez | 8 | 0 | 4+4 | 0 | 0 | 0 |
| 98 | DF | (England) ENG | Antonee Burke-Gilroy | 13 | 0 | 11+2 | 0 | 0 | 0 |
| 99 | FW | (United States) USA | Justin Dhillon | 1 | 1 | 1 | 1 | 0 | 0 |

- Last updated: October 3, 2020

=== Top scorers ===
| Rank | Position | Number | Name | Regular season | Playoffs | Total |
|---|---|---|---|---|---|---|
| 1 | FW | 32 | (Puerto Rico) Alec Díaz | 5 | 0 | 5 |
| 4 | FW | 34 | (United States) Danny Robles | 3 | 0 | 3 |
| 4 | MF | 80 | (United States) Ray Serrano | 3 | 0 | 3 |
| 4 | MF | 90 | (United States) Chino Pérez | 3 | 0 | 3 |
| 5 | MF | 38 | (United States) Azriel Gonzalez | 2 | 0 | 2 |
| 6 | DF | 33 | (United States) Sam Rogers | 1 | 0 | 1 |
| 6 | MF | 40 | (United States) Chris Hegardt | 1 | 0 | 1 |
| 6 | MF | 45 | (United States) Ethan Dobbelaere | 1 | 0 | 1 |
| 6 | MF | 74 | (United States) Taylor Mueller | 1 | 0 | 1 |
| 6 | MF | 87 | (United States) Alfonso Ocampo-Chavez | 1 | 0 | 1 |
| 6 | MF | 89 | (Australia) Jesse Daley | 1 | 0 | 1 |
| 6 | DF | 92 | (France) Abdoulaye Cissoko | 1 | 0 | 1 |
| 6 | FW | 99 | (United States) Justin Dhillon | 1 | 0 | 1 |

- Last updated: October 3, 2020

=== Top assists ===
| Rank | Position | Number | Name | Regular Season | Playoffs | Total |
|---|---|---|---|---|---|---|
| 1 | FW | 34 | (United States) Danny Robles | 3 | 0 | 3 |
| 1 | DF | 81 | (England) Danny Reynolds | 3 | 0 | 3 |
| 3 | FW | 32 | (Puerto Rico) Alec Díaz | 2 | 0 | 2 |
| 3 | MF | 39 | (United States) Marlon Vargas | 2 | 0 | 2 |
| 3 | FW | 87 | (United States) Alfonso Ocampo-Chavez | 2 | 0 | 2 |
| 3 | MF | 98 | (England) Antonee Burke-Gilroy | 2 | 0 | 2 |
| 7 | FW | 37 | (United States) Shandon Hopeau | 1 | 0 | 1 |
| 7 | MF | 40 | (United States) Chris Hegardt | 1 | 0 | 1 |
| 7 | MF | 90 | (United States) Chino Pérez | 1 | 0 | 1 |
| 7 | MF | 98 | (United States) Azriel Gonzalez | 1 | 0 | 1 |

- Last updated: October 3, 2020

=== Disciplinary record ===
| No. | Pos | Player | Regular Season | | | Playoffs | | | Total | | |
| No. | Pos | Player | Booked | (yellow card) (yellow-red card) | Sent off (straight red) | Booked | (yellow card) (yellow-red card) | Sent off (straight red) | Booked | (yellow card) (yellow-red card) | Sent off (straight red) |
| 31 | DF | (United States) Nick Hinds | 1 | 0 | 0 | 0 | 0 | 0 | 1 | 0 | 0 |
| 32 | FW | (Puerto Rico) Alec Díaz | 1 | 0 | 0 | 0 | 0 | 0 | 1 | 0 | 0 |
| 32 | FW | (United States) Danny Robles | 1 | 0 | 0 | 0 | 0 | 0 | 1 | 0 | 0 |
| 38 | MF | (United States) Azriel Gonzalez | 1 | 0 | 0 | 0 | 0 | 0 | 1 | 0 | 0 |
| 40 | MF | (United States) Chris Hegardt | 2 | 0 | 0 | 0 | 0 | 0 | 2 | 0 | 0 |
| 43 | MF | (United States) Sota Kitahara | 3 | 0 | 0 | 0 | 0 | 0 | 3 | 0 | 0 |
| 49 | MF | (United States) Reed Baker-Whiting | 1 | 0 | 0 | 0 | 0 | 0 | 1 | 0 | 0 |
| 52 | DF | (United States) Eric Kinzner | 1 | 0 | 0 | 0 | 0 | 0 | 1 | 0 | 0 |
| 64 | GK | (United States) Christian Herrera | 1 | 0 | 0 | 0 | 0 | 0 | 1 | 0 | 0 |
| 74 | DF | (United States) Taylor Mueller | 2 | 0 | 0 | 0 | 0 | 0 | 2 | 0 | 0 |
| 80 | MF | (United States) Ray Serrano | 1 | 0 | 0 | 0 | 0 | 0 | 1 | 0 | 0 |
| 81 | DF | (England) Danny Reynolds | 1 | 0 | 0 | 0 | 0 | 0 | 1 | 0 | 0 |
| 84 | MF | (United States) Josh Atencio | 1 | 0 | 0 | 0 | 0 | 0 | 1 | 0 | 0 |
| 87 | FW | (United States) Alfonso Ocampo-Chavez | 1 | 0 | 0 | 0 | 0 | 0 | 1 | 0 | 0 |
| 89 | DF | (Australia) Jesse Daley | 2 | 0 | 0 | 0 | 0 | 0 | 2 | 0 | 0 |
| 92 | DF | (France) Abdoulaye Cissoko | 2 | 0 | 0 | 0 | 0 | 0 | 2 | 0 | 0 |
| 97 | MF | (United States) Collin Fernandez | 1 | 0 | 0 | 0 | 0 | 0 | 1 | 0 | 0 |
| 98 | MF | (England) Antonee Burke-Gilroy | 1 | 0 | 0 | 0 | 0 | 0 | 1 | 0 | 0 |
| Total | | | 24 | 0 | 0 | 0 | 0 | 0 | 24 | 0 | 0 |

- Last updated: October 3, 2020

== Honors and awards ==
=== Team of the Week ===
| Week | Position | Player | Ref |
|---|---|---|---|
| 4 | FW | (Puerto Rico) Alec Díaz | |
| 4 | Bench | (United States) Danny Robles | |
| 7 | FW | (Puerto Rico) Alec Díaz | |
| 15 | DF | (England) Danny Reynolds | |

== Transfers ==
For transfers in, dates listed are when Tacoma Defiance officially signed the players to the roster. Transactions where only the rights to the players are acquired are not listed. For transfers out, dates listed are when Defiance officially removed the players from its roster, not when they signed with another club. If a player later signed with another club, his new club will be noted, but the date listed here remains the one when he was officially removed from Tacoma Defiance roster.

=== In ===
| No. | Pos. | Player | Transferred from | Fee/notes | Date | Source |
|---|---|---|---|---|---|---|
| 74 | DF | (United States) Taylor Mueller | (United States) Charleston Battery | Free transfer | December 12, 2019 | |
| 97 | MF | (United States) Collin Fernandez | (United States) Saint Louis FC | Free transfer | January 14, 2020 | |
| 51 | DF | (England) Danny Reynolds | (United States) UNC Wilmington | Seattle Sounders FC MLS SuperDraft 2nd round Pick (#35) | February 7, 2020 | |
| 90 | MF | (United States) Jesús Pérez | (United States) UIC | New York City FC MLS SuperDraft 1st round Pick (#22) | February 19, 2020 | |
| 52 | DF | (United States) Eric Kinzner | (United States) Sounders FC Academy | | July 13, 2020 | |
| 64 | GK | (United States) Christian Herrera | (United States) Oakland Roots SC | On loan through until September 12 | July 13, 2020 | |
| 49 | MF | (United States) Reed Baker-Whiting | (United States) Sounders FC Academy | | July 23, 2020 | |
| 87 | FW | (United States) Alfonso Ocampo-Chavez | (United States) Seattle Sounders FC | loan through end of season | August 3, 2020 | |
| 42 | DF | (United States) Alex Villanueva | (United States) Sounders FC Academy | | August 19, 2020 | |
| 65 | GK | (United States) Eric Klenofsky | (Canada) Toronto FC II | On loan through end of season | September 2, 2020 | |
| 45 | MF | (United States) Ethan Dobbelaere | (United States) Seattle Sounders FC | On loan through end of season | September 3, 2020 | |
| 31 | GK | (United States) Christian Herrera | (United States) Oakland Roots SC | Signed after end of loan | December 15, 2020 | |
| 88 | MF | (United States) Carlos Anguiano | (United States) Portland Timbers 2 | Free | December 15, 2020 | |
| | MF | (United States) Sota Kitahara | (United States) Sounders FC Academy | | December 15, 2020 | |

=== Out ===
| No. | Pos. | Player | Transferred to | Fee/notes | Date | Source |
|---|---|---|---|---|---|---|
| 71 | DF | (United States) Aleks Berkolds | (United States) Reno 1868 FC | Option declined | November 21, 2019 | |
| 88 | DF | (United States) Matt Nance | | Option declined | November 21, 2019 | |
| 96 | DF | (Mexico) Ever Rubio | (United States) Colorado Springs Switchbacks FC | Option declined | November 21, 2019 | |
| 90 | MF | (Mexico) Herbert Robinson García | (Mexico) Deportivo CAFESSA Jalisco | Option declined | November 21, 2019 | |
| 73 | DF | (The Gambia) Modou Ndow | (Czech Republic) MFK Vyškov | End of loan | November 21, 2019 | |
| 36 | DF | (Haiti) Denso Ulysse | (United States) Inter Miami CF | Free transfer | November 21, 2019 | |
| 78 | MF | (Democratic Republic of the Congo) Ben Numbi | (Czech Republic) MFK Vyškov | End of loan | November 21, 2019 | |
| 84 | MF | (United States) Josh Atencio | (United States) Seattle Sounders FC | Signed Homegrown contract | June 15, 2020 | |
| 37 | FW | (United States) Shandon Hopeau | (United States) Seattle Sounders FC | Signed Homegrown contract | June 30, 2020 | |
| 89 | MF | (Australia) Jesse Daley | (Australia) Brisbane Roar FC | Requested release | August 12, 2020 | |
| 64 | GK | (United States) Christian Herrera | (United States) Oakland Roots SC | Recalled from loan | September 3, 2020 | |
