= 2019 Tacoma Defiance season =

Tacoma Defiance
2019 season
- General manager: Marc Nicholls
- Head coach: Chris Little
- Stadium: Cheney Stadium
- USL Championship: Conference: 17th
- USL Playoffs: DNQ
- Top goalscorer: Justin Dhillon
- Highest home attendance: League: 5,185 (October 19 vs. Austin Bold FC)
- Lowest home attendance: League: 1,396 (April 1 vs. Sacramento Republic)
- Average home league attendance: League: 2,636
- Biggest win: 5–1 (August 30 vs. San Antonio)
- Biggest defeat: 0–5 (April 13 at Las Vegas) (July 12 at Real Monarchs) (September 10 at Reno)
Home colors	Away colors

The 2019 Tacoma Defiance season was the club's fifth year of existence, previously for the last four seasons as Seattle Sounders FC 2, and their fifth season in the USL Championship, the second tier of the United States Soccer Pyramid. It was the team's second season playing in the Tacoma, Washington. The Defiance are majority owned by Seattle Sounders FC.

== Roster ==
Note: Flags indicate national team as defined under FIFA eligibility rules; some limited exceptions apply. Players may hold more than one non-FIFA nationality. Squad correct as of October 16, 2019.

No.	Pos.	Nation	Player
1	GK	USA	Trey Muse
3	DF	USA	Jonathan Campbell
5	DF	CMR	Nouhou Tolo
12	DF	USA	Saad Abdul-Salaam
16	MF	USA	Alex Roldan
17	FW	USA	Will Bruin
21	MF	MTQ	Jordy Delem
23	MF	USA	Henry Wingo
29	DF	PAN	Román Torres
31	DF	USA	Nick Hinds
32	FW	PUR	Alec Díaz
33	DF	USA	Sam Rogers
34	FW	USA	Danny Robles
35	GK	USA	Bryan Meredith
36	DF	HAI	Denso Ulysse
37	FW	USA	Shandon Hopeau
38	MF	USA	Azriel Gonzalez
39	MF	USA	Marlon Vargas
40	DF	USA	Enrique Montana
41	DF	USA	Khai Brisco
42	MF	USA	Alex Villanueva
43	MF	USA	Sota Kitahara
44	MF	USA	Ethan Dobbelaere
45	MF	USA	Blake Malone
46	MF	USA	Peter Kingston
47	DF	USA	Conner Drought
48	MF	USA	Chris Hegardt
49	DF	USA	Bryson Hankins
50	MF	USA	Gabe Threadgold
56	FW	USA	Austin Brummett
65	GK	USA	Jamie Lowell
66	GK	USA	Sam Fowler
67	GK	USA	Jacob Castro
70	MF	KEN	Handwalla Bwana
71	DF	USA	Aleks Berkolds
73	DF	GAM	Modou Ndow
75	MF	USA	Danny Leyva
78	MF	COD	Ben Numbi
80	MF	USA	Ray Serrano
84	MF	USA	Josh Atencio
87	FW	USA	Alfonso Ocampo-Chavez
88	DF	USA	Matt Nance
89	MF	AUS	Jesse Daley
90	MF	MEX	Herbert Robinson García
96	DF	MEX	Everardo Rubio
98	MF	ENG	Antonee Burke-Gilroy
99	FW	USA	Justin Dhillon

1. Signed to first team contract with Sounders FC.
2. Sounders FC Academy player.

=== Out on loan ===
Note: Flags indicate national team as defined under FIFA eligibility rules; some limited exceptions apply. Players may hold more than one non-FIFA nationality. Squad correct as of September 6, 2019.

No.	Pos.	Nation	Player
—	DF	FRA	Abdoulaye Cissoko (on season long loan to San Diego 1904 FC)

== Competitions ==
=== Preseason ===
	Tacoma Defiance	–	Gonzaga Bulldogs
(PDT)
Note: Match results not publicized.

February 16, 2019	Tacoma Defiance	2–2 (a.e.t.)	Vancouver Whitecaps U-23	Tukwila, WA
(PDT)	Goal	Report	Guilherme 30'; Alade 63'	Stadium: Starfire Sports Complex
Note: Teams played 15 minutes of extra time.

March 3, 2019	Seattle Redhawks	3–0	Tacoma Defiance	Seattle, WA
7:00 pm (PDT)				Stadium: Championship Field

=== Friendlies ===
	–
(PDT)

=== USL regular season ===
==== Standings ====
Pos	Team	Pld	W	D	L	GF	GA	GD	Pts
14	Portland Timbers 2	34	10	8	16	65	71	−6	38
15	OKC Energy FC	34	9	11	14	45	58	−13	38
16	Tulsa Roughnecks	34	8	10	16	45	69	−24	34
17	Tacoma Defiance	34	8	7	19	42	82	−40	31
18	Colorado Springs Switchbacks	34	7	6	21	31	65	−34	27

Source: USL Championship Standings
Rules for classification: 1) total wins; 2) total goal differential; 3) total goals scored; 4) points earned against top four Conference finishers; 5) disciplinary points; 6) coin toss or drawing of lots

==== Results summary ====
Overall								Home						Away					
Pld	W	D	L	GF	GA	GD	Pts	W	D	L	GF	GA	GD	W	D	L	GF	GA	GD
34	8	7	19	42	82	−40	31	7	3	7	30	31	−1	1	4	12	12	51	−39

Last updated: October 19, 2019.
Source: USL Championship

==== Results by matchday ====
Matchday	1	2	3	4	5	6	7	8	9	10	11	12	13	14	15	16	17	18	19	20	21	22	23	24	25	26	27	28	29	30	31	32	33	34
Stadium	H	H	A	H	H	A	A	A	A	A	H	H	H	A	H	A	A	A	A	H	H	H	A	H	H	A	A	H	A	H	A	H	A	H
Result	W	L	L	L	W	L	L	L	L	L	L	D	D	D	L	L	D	D	L	W	L	W	L	L	W	L	L	L	L	D	W	W	D	W

A = Away; H = Home; W = Win; D = DrawW; L = Loss

==== Matches ====
Win Draw Loss Upcoming fixture

March 8, 2019 USL 1	Tacoma Defiance	1–0	Rio Grande Valley FC Toros	Tacoma, Washington
7:00 pm (PST)	Díaz 49'; Atencio (yellow card) 68'; Ndow (yellow card) 84'	Preview	Coronado (yellow card) 77'	Stadium: Cheney Stadium; Attendance: 3,432; Referee: Alejandro Mariscal

March 16, 2019 USL 2	Tacoma Defiance	0–3	LA Galaxy II	Tacoma, Washington
7:00 pm (PDT)	Rydstrand (yellow card) 79'	Report	Harvey (yellow card) 29'; Williams 24', 60'; Walker 41'; Acheampong (yellow card) 68'	Stadium: Cheney Stadium; Attendance: 2,911; Referee: Victor Rivas

March 23, 2019 USL 3	Tulsa Roughnecks FC	4–0	Tacoma Defiance	Tulsa, Oklahoma
1:00 pm (PDT)	Hedrick 8'; Altamirano 20'; Lobo 44', 57'	Preview	Rydstrand (yellow card) 23'	Stadium: ONEOK Field; Attendance: 2,489; Referee: Thomas Snyder

March 29, 2019 USL 4	Tacoma Defiance	1–2	New Mexico United	Tacoma, Washington
7:00 pm (PDT)	Gonzalez 2'; Ndow (yellow card) 27'	Preview	Frater (yellow card) 17', (goal) 77'; Moar (yellow card) 23'; Williams 37'	Stadium: Cheney Stadium; Attendance: 1,837; Referee: Dejan Susak

April 1, 2019 USL 5	Tacoma Defiance	2–1	Sacramento Republic FC	Tacoma, Washington
7:00 pm (PDT)	Leyva (yellow card) 22'; Wingo 50'; Bruin 78'	Report	Keinan (yellow card) 55'; Iwasa 88' (pen.)	Stadium: Cheney Stadium; Attendance: 1,396; Referee: Alejandro Aguilera

April 10, 2019 USL 6	Orange County SC	4–0	Tacoma Defiance	Irvine, California
7:00 pm (PDT)	Jones 28'; Forrester (yellow card) 50'; Leonardo 71'; Seaton 85'; Vinicius 89'	Report		Stadium: Champions Soccer Stadium at OC Great Park; Attendance: 1,558; Referee: Fotis Bazakos

April 13, 2019 USL 7	Las Vegas Lights FC	5–0	Tacoma Defiance	Las Vegas, Nevada
7:30 pm (PDT)	Tabortetaka 11', 50'; Parra 23' (pen.), 32', 60', (yellow card) 61'	Report	Daley (yellow card) 28' (yellow-red card) 63'; Campbell (yellow card) 56'	Stadium: Cashman Field; Attendance: 7,805; Referee: Elijio Arreguin

April 20, 2019 USL 8	Phoenix Rising FC	4–0	Tacoma Defiance	Scottsdale, Arizona
7:30 pm (PDT)	Flemmings 34', 44'; Johnson 37'; Asante 53'; Blackmon (yellow card) 90'	Report	Hinds (yellow card) 45+1'; Ulysse (yellow card) 65'	Stadium: Phoenix Rising Soccer Complex; Attendance: 6,534; Referee: Guido Gonzales, Jr.

April 26, 2019 USL 9	San Antonio FC	3–0	Tacoma Defiance	San Antonio, Texas
5:30 pm (PDT)	Jamieson IV 9'; Barmby 19', 24'; Eboussi (red card) 60'; Restrepo (yellow card) 69'	Preview	Kingston (yellow card) 42'	Stadium: Toyota Field; Attendance: 6,357; Referee: Luis Guardia

May 4, 2019 USL 10	OKC Energy FC	2–1	Tacoma Defiance	Oklahoma City, Oklahoma
5:30 pm (PDT)	Brown 13', 70' da Fonte (yellow card) 42'	Preview	Daley (yellow card) 16'; Gonzalez 40'; Hinds (yellow card) 47'; Rydstrand (yellow card) 68'	Stadium: Taft Stadium; Attendance: 3,338; Referee: Matthew Thompson

May 12, 2019 USL 11	Tacoma Defiance	1–4	Portland Timbers 2	Tacoma, Washington
1:30 pm (PDT)	Dhillon 42'; Hinds (yellow card) 88'	Report	Langsdorf 24'; Williamson (yellow card) 38'; Asprilla 49' (pen.), 61'; Hurtado 59'	Stadium: Cheney Stadium; Attendance: 1,927; Referee: Alejandro Mariscal

May 18, 2019 USL 12	Tacoma Defiance	1–1	Reno 1868 FC	Tacoma, Washington
7:00 pm (PDT)	Dhillon 1'; Daley (yellow card) 57'	Recap	Brown 84'	Stadium: Cheney Stadium; Attendance: 2,121; Referee: Dejean Susak
Note: Dhillon's goal at 8 seconds was the fastest scored in USL Championship history

May 26, 2019 USL 13	Tacoma Defiance	3–3	Fresno FC	Tacoma, Washington
1:30 pm (PDT)	Wingo (yellow card) 31'; Hopeau 52'; Dhillon 90'	Report	Lawal 38'; Daly 48' (o.g.); Basuljevic 54'; Chavez 81'	Stadium: Cheney Stadium; Attendance: 1,788; Referee: Mark Allatin

May 29, 2019 USL 14	LA Galaxy II	2–2	Tacoma Defiance	Carson, California
7:30 pm (PDT)	Vera (yellow card) 40'; DePuy (yellow card) 41'; Fiddes (yellow card) 42'; Remero (yellow card) 42'; Koreniuk (yellow card) 82'; López 87'; Iloski 90'	Report	Dhillon 4', (yellow card) 75'; Daley 21'; Ulysse (yellow card) 23'; Ocampo-Chavez (yellow card) 42'; Gonzalez (yellow card) 43'	Stadium: Dignity Health Sports Park; Attendance: 681; Referee: Malik Badawi

June 1, 2019 USL 15	Tacoma Defiance	1–2	El Paso Locomotive FC	Tacoma, Washington
7:00 pm (PDT)	Rogers (yellow card) 24'; Dhillon 42'; Daley (yellow card) 55'; Rydstrand (yellow card) 70'	Report	Kiesewetter 31'; Herrera (yellow card) 62'; Rezende 68'; Ross (yellow card) 75'	Stadium: Cheney Stadium; Attendance: 2,202; Referee: Joseph Salinas

June 8, 2019 USL 16	Colorado Springs Switchbacks FC	3–0	Tacoma Defiance	Colorado Springs, Colorado
5:00 pm (PDT)	Burt 23', (yellow card) 45+3'; Yaro (yellow card) 34'; Dorsey 71'; Jome 87'	Report	Gonzalez (yellow card) 51'; Berkolds (yellow card) 89'	Stadium: Weidner Field; Attendance: 3,547; Referee: Greg Dopka

June 15, 2019 USL 17	Austin Bold FC	1–1	Tacoma Defiance	Austin, Texas
5:30 pm (PDT)	Kléber 61'; Báez (yellow card) 90'	Report	Dhillon 37'; Daley (yellow card) 82'; Gonzalez (red card) 88'	Stadium: Bold Stadium; Attendance: 2,755; Referee: Matthew Thompson

July 6, 2019 USL 18	Rio Grande Valley FC	0–0	Tacoma Defiance	Edinburg, Texas
5:30 pm (PDT)	Junqua (yellow card) 42'	Report	Hinds (yellow card) 58'; Atencio (yellow card) 69'; Daley (yellow card) 78'; Vargas (yellow card) 90+6'	Stadium: H-E-B Park; Attendance: 3,228; Referee: Calin Radosav

July 12, 2019 USL 19	Real Monarchs SLC	5–0	Tacoma Defiance	Herriman, Utah
7:00 pm (PDT)	Chang 8'; Martínez 36', (yellow card) 62', (goal) 67', 76'; Blake 83'	Report		Stadium: Zions Bank Stadium; Attendance: 1,919; Referee: Michael Radchuk

July 24, 2019 USL 20	Tacoma Defiance	4–1	Las Vegas Lights FC	Tacoma, Washington
7:00 pm (PDT)	Dhillon 31'; Ocampo-Chavez 47', 66'; Burke-Gilroy (yellow card) 73'; Hopeau 85'	Report	Sandoval (yellow card) 4'; Torre 36', (red card) 75'; Parra (yellow card) 45+2'; Olsen (yellow card) 69'; Gonzalez (red card) 70'; Ochoa (red card) 86'; Preston (yellow card) 90+4'	Stadium: Cheney Stadium; Attendance: 2,208; Referee: Lukasz Szpala

July 27, 2019 USL 21	Tacoma Defiance	0–2	OKC Energy FC	Tacoma, Washington
7:00 pm (PDT)		Report	Gordon (yellow card) 15'; Ross (yellow card) 53'; Hyland 77'; Harris 89'	Stadium: Cheney Stadium; Attendance: 2,291; Referee: Farhad Dadkho

August 9, 2019 USL 22	Tacoma Defiance	2–1	Orange County SC	Tacoma, Washington
7:00 pm (PDT)	Hopeau 43'; Berkolds (yellow card) 45'; Vargas 52', (yellow card) 55'; Hinds (yellow card) 62'	Report	Seaton 11', (yellow card) 89'; Orozco (yellow card) 23'; Quinn (yellow card) 44'; Leonardo (yellow card) 47'	Stadium: Cheney Stadium; Attendance: 3,222; Referee: Kevin Broadley

August 17, 2019 USL 23	El Paso Locomotive FC	2–0	Tacoma Defiance	El Paso, Texas
6:30 pm (PDT)	Partida 32'; Makinde (yellow card) 48'; N'Toko (red card) 62'; Salgado 70'	Report	Berkolds (yellow card) 9'; Rubio (yellow card) 37'; Atencio (yellow card) 58'; Dhillon (yellow card) 61'	Stadium: Southwest University Park; Attendance: 6,222; Referee: Marco Vega

August 27, 2019 USL 24	Tacoma Defiance	2–4	Phoenix Rising FC	Tacoma, Washington
7:00 pm (PDT)	Hopeau 26' (pen.); Bwana 72'	Report	Musa (yellow card) 1'; Jahn 2', 83'; Lambert (yellow card) 67'; Asante 81'; Flemmings 84'	Stadium: Cheney Stadium; Attendance: 2,710; Referee: Alejandro Mariscal

August 30, 2019 USL 25	Tacoma Defiance	5–1	San Antonio FC	Tacoma, Washington
7:00 pm (PDT)	Dhillon (yellow card) 9', (goal) 17', 90'; Robles 29'; Ocampo-Chavez 75' (pen.); Dobbelaere 80'; Daley (yellow card) 86'	Report	Barmby (yellow card) 31'; Hernández (yellow card) 74'; Restrepo (yellow card) 86'; Yaro 88'	Stadium: Cheney Stadium; Attendance: 2,880; Referee: Elijio Arreguin

September 7, 2019 USL 26	Sacramento Republic FC	3–0	Tacoma Defiance	Sacramento, California
7:30 pm (PDT)	Skundrich (yellow card) 11'; Enevoldsen 13', 75'; Taintor (yellow card) 18'; Iwasa 45+2'	Report	Vargas (yellow card) 33'; Hegardt (yellow card) 90+4'	Stadium: Papa Murphy's Park; Attendance: 10,218; Referee: Luis Guardia

September 10, 2019 USL 27	Reno 1868 FC	5–0	Tacoma Defiance	Reno, Nevada
7:00 pm (PDT)	Musovski 4', 26', 30', 41'; Casiple 27'; Seymore (yellow card) 74'	Report	Dhillon (penalty missed) 47'	Stadium: Greater Nevada Field; Attendance: 3,616; Referee: Victor Rivas

September 17, 2019 USL 28	Tacoma Defiance	1–4	Real Monarchs SLC	Tacoma, Washington
7:00 pm (PDT)	Ocampo-Chavez (yellow card) 4', (goal) 60'; Leyva (yellow card) 4' (yellow-red card) 64'; Rubio (yellow card) 44' (yellow-red card) 44'; Berkolds (yellow card) 90+2'	Report	Coffee 32'; Chang 55', 73' (pen.); Brown (yellow card) 58'; Plewa (yellow card) 63'; Blake (yellow card) 81'; Cálix 89'; Powder (yellow card) 90+2'	Stadium: Cheney Stadium; Attendance: 2,016; Referee: Mark Allatin

September 20, 2019 USL 29	Portland Timbers 2	6–3	Tacoma Defiance	Portland, Oregon
7:30 pm (PDT)	Hurtado 3'; Asprilla 22', 48' (pen.), (yellow card) 58'; Sierakowski 40'; Williamson 45'; Anguiano 83'	Report	Roldan 42'; Daley (yellow card) 44'; Dhillon (yellow card) 53', (goal) 53'; Ocampo-Chavez 90+1'	Stadium: Providence Park; Attendance: 1,504; Referee: Matthew Thompson

September 28, 2019 USL 30	Tacoma Defiance	1–1	Tulsa Roughnecks FC	Tacoma, Washington
7:00 pm (PDT)	Leyva (yellow card) 33'; Hinds (yellow card) 53'; Hopeau 86'	Report	Uzo (yellow card) 36' (yellow-red card) 75', (goal) 60'; Marlon (yellow card) 72'	Stadium: Cheney Stadium; Attendance: 3,327; Referee: Reyna Fonseca

October 5, 2019 USL 31	Fresno FC	1–4	Tacoma Defiance	Fresno, California
7:30 pm (PDT)	Samura (yellow card) 52'; Chaney 83'; Alihodžić (yellow card) 90+1'	Report	Villanueva (yellow card) 28'; Dhillon 31', 64'; Daley (yellow card) 53'; Ocampo-Chavez 69' (yellow card) 69'; Leyva 75'	Stadium: Chukchansi Park; Attendance: 3,819; Referee: Eric Tattersall

October 12, 2019 USL 32	Tacoma Defiance	2–0	Colorado Springs Switchbacks FC	Tacoma, Washington
7:00 pm (PDT)	Daley (yellow card) 55'; Burke-Gilroy (yellow card) 61'; Atencio 90+3'; Robles 90+4'	Report	Robinson (yellow card) 10'; Reaves (yellow card) 26'	Stadium: Cheney Stadium; Attendance: 3,351; Referee: Danielle Chesky

October 16, 2019 USL 33	New Mexico United	1–1	Tacoma Defiance	Albuquerque, New Mexico
6:00 pm (PDT)	Wehan 8'; Frater (yellow card) 63'	Report	Gonzalez 7'; Rubio (yellow card) 88'	Stadium: Isotopes Park; Attendance: 9,323; Referee: Yusri Rudolf

October 19, 2019 USL 34	Tacoma Defiance	3–1	Austin Bold FC	Tacoma, Washington
7:00 pm (PDT)	Gonzalez 21'; Vargas 77'; Daley 79'; Hegardt (yellow card) 88'; Rogers (yellow card) 89'	Report	de Villardi (yellow card) 61'; Tyrpak 82'	Stadium: Cheney Stadium; Attendance: 5,185; Referee: Malik Badawi

=== U.S. Open Cup ===
Due to their ownership by a higher division professional club (Seattle Sounders FC), Tacoma is one of 13 teams expressly forbidden from entering the Cup competition.

== Statistics ==
=== Appearances and goals ===
Numbers after plus-sign(+) denote appearances as a substitute.

No.	Pos	Nat	Player	Total		Regular season		Playoffs	
No.	Pos	Nat	Player	Apps	Goals	Apps	Goals	Apps	Goals
1	GK	(United States) USA	Trey Muse	22	0	21+1	0	0	0
3	DF	(United States) USA	Jonathan Campbell	12	0	12	0	0	0
5	DF	(Cameroon) CMR	Nouhou Tolo	1	0	1	0	0	0
12	DF	(United States) USA	Saad Abdul-Salaam	3	0	3	0	0	0
16	MF	(United States) USA	Alex Roldan	6	1	6	1	0	0
17	FW	(United States) USA	Will Bruin	1	1	1	1	0	0
21	MF	(Martinique) MTQ	Jordy Delem	1	0	1	0	0	0
23	DF	(United States) USA	Henry Wingo	7	1	7	1	0	0
29	DF	(Panama) PAN	Román Torres	1	0	1	0	0	0
31	DF	(United States) USA	Nick Hinds	27	0	22+5	0	0	0
32	FW	(Puerto Rico) PUR	Alec Díaz	16	1	8+8	1	0	0
33	DF	(United States) USA	Sam Rogers	20	0	18+2	0	0	0
34	FW	(United States) USA	Danny Robles	24	2	16+8	2	0	0
35	GK	(United States) USA	Bryan Meredith	8	0	8	0	0	0
36	DF	(Haiti) HAI	Denso Ulysse	15	0	12+3	0	0	0
37	FW	(United States) USA	Shandon Hopeau	28	5	25+3	5	0	0
38	MF	(United States) USA	Azriel Gonzalez	18	4	13+5	4	0	0
39	MF	(United States) USA	Marlon Vargas	24	2	13+11	2	0	0
40	DF	(United States) USA	Enrique Montana	1	0	1	0	0	0
42	MF	(United States) USA	Alex Villanueva	5	0	4+1	0	0	0
43	MF	(United States) USA	Sota Kitahara	2	0	2	0	0	0
44	MF	(United States) USA	Ethan Dobbelaere	7	1	2+5	1	0	0
46	MF	(United States) USA	Peter Kingston	3	0	3	0	0	0
47	DF	(United States) USA	Connor Drought	1	0	1	0	0	0
48	MF	(United States) USA	Chris Hegardt	6	0	3+3	0	0	0
49	DF	(United States) USA	Bryson Hankins	1	0	1	0	0	0
50	FW	(United States) USA	Gabe Threadgold	1	0	0+1	0	0	0
56	FW	(United States) USA	Austin Brummett	2	0	1+1	0	0	0
65	GK	(United States) USA	Jamie Lowell	2	0	2	0	0	0
66	GK	(United States) USA	Sam Fowler	1	0	1	0	0	0
67	GK	(United States) USA	Jacob Castro	2	0	2	0	0	0
70	MF	(Kenya) KEN	Handwalla Bwana	6	1	6	1	0	0
71	DF	(United States) USA	Aleks Berkolds	23	0	22+1	0	0	0
72	MF	(Sweden) SWE	Joel Rydstrand	16	0	11+5	0	0	0
73	DF	(The Gambia) GAM	Modou Ndow	5	0	4+1	0	0	0
75	MF	(United States) USA	Danny Leyva	14	1	12+2	1	0	0
78	MF	(Democratic Republic of the Congo) COD	Ben Numbi	1	0	0+1	0	0	0
80	MF	(United States) USA	Ray Serrano	8	0	2+6	0	0	0
84	MF	(United States) USA	Josh Atencio	25	1	23+2	1	0	0
87	FW	(United States) USA	Alfonso Ocampo-Chavez	17	6	13+4	6	0	0
88	DF	(United States) USA	Matt Nance	7	0	6+1	0	0	0
89	MF	(Australia) AUS	Jesse Daley	23	2	20+3	2	0	0
90	MF	(Mexico) MEX	Herbert Robinson García	6	0	1+5	0	0	0
96	DF	(Mexico) MEX	Everardo Rubio	8	0	6+2	0	0	0
98	MF	(England) ENG	Antonee Burke-Gilroy	22	0	18+4	0	0	0
99	FW	(United States) USA	Justin Dhillon	24	12	19+5	12	0	0

- Last updated: October 19, 2019

=== Top scorers ===
Rank	Position	Number	Name	Regular season	Playoffs	Total
1	FW	99	(United States) Justin Dhillon	12	0	12
2	FW	87	(United States) Alfonso Ocampo-Chavez	6	0	6
3	FW	37	(United States) Shandon Hopeau	5	0	5
4	MF	38	(United States) Azriel Gonzalez	4	0	4
5	FW	34	(United States) Danny Robles	2	0	2
5	MF	89	(Australia) Jesse Daley	2	0	2
15	MF	16	(United States) Alex Roldan	1	0	1
15	FW	17	(United States) Will Bruin	1	0	1
15	DF	23	(United States) Henry Wingo	1	0	1
15	FW	32	(Puerto Rico) Alec Díaz	1	0	1
15	MF	39	(United States) Marlon Vargas	2	0	2
15	MF	44	(United States) Ethan Dobbelaere	1	0	1
15	MF	70	(Kenya) Handwalla Bwana	1	0	1
15	MF	75	(United States) Danny Leyva	1	0	1
15	MF	84	(United States) Josh Atencio	1	0	1

- Last updated: October 19, 2019

=== Top assists ===
Rank	Position	Number	Name	Regular Season	Playoffs	Total
1	DF	31	(United States) Nick Hinds	4	0	4
2	FW	37	(United States) Shandon Hopeau	4	0	4
2	DF	38	(United States) Azriel Gonzalez	3	0	3
3	MF	70	(Kenya) Handwalla Bwana	2	0	2
3	FW	87	(United States) Alfonso Ocampo-Chavez	2	0	2
3	MF	89	(Australia) Jesse Daley	2	0	2
3	FW	99	(United States) Justin Dhillon	2	0	2
8	DF	12	(United States) Saad Abdul-Salaam	1	0	1
8	FW	17	(United States) Will Bruin	1	0	1
8	MF	39	(United States) Marlon Vargas	1	0	1
8	MF	42	(United States) Alex Villanueva	1	0	1

- Last updated: October 19, 2019

=== Disciplinary record ===
No.	Pos	Player	Regular Season			Playoffs			Total		
No.	Pos	Player	Yellow card	(yellow card) (yellow-red card)	Red card	Yellow card	(yellow card) (yellow-red card)	Red card	Yellow card	(yellow card) (yellow-red card)	Red card
3	DF	(United States) Jonathan Campbell	1	0	0	0	0	0	1	0	0
23	DF	(United States) Henry Wingo	1	0	0	0	0	0	1	0	0
31	DF	(United States) Nick Hinds	6	0	0	0	0	0	6	0	0
32	FW	(Puerto Rico) Alec Díaz	1	0	0	0	0	0	1	0	0
33	DF	(United States) Sam Rogers	2	0	0	0	0	0	2	0	0
36	DF	(Haiti) Denso Ulysse	2	0	0	0	0	0	2	0	0
38	MF	(United States) Azriel Gonzalez	2	0	1	0	0	0	2	0	1
39	MF	(United States) Marlon Vargas	3	0	0	0	0	0	3	0	0
43	MF	(United States) Alex Villanueva	1	0	0	0	0	0	1	0	0
46	MF	(United States) Peter Kingston	1	0	0	0	0	0	1	0	0
48	MF	(United States) Chris Hegardt	2	0	0	0	0	0	2	0	0
71	DF	(United States) Aleks Berkolds	4	0	0	0	0	0	4	0	0
72	MF	(Sweden) Joel Rydstrand	4	0	0	0	0	0	4	0	0
73	DF	(The Gambia) Modou Ndow	2	0	0	0	0	0	2	0	0
75	MF	(United States) Danny Leyva	2	1	0	0	0	0	2	1	0
84	MF	(United States) Josh Atencio	3	0	0	0	0	0	3	0	0
87	FW	(United States) Alfonso Ocampo-Chavez	4	0	0	0	0	0	4	0	0
89	DF	(Australia) Jesse Daley	9	1	0	0	0	0	9	1	0
96	DF	(Mexico) Everardo Rubio	2	1	0	0	0	0	2	1	0
98	MF	(England) Antonee Burke-Gilroy	3	0	0	0	0	0	3	0	0
99	FW	(United States) Justin Dhillon	4	0	0	0	0	0	4	0	0
Total			59	3	1	0	0	0	59	3	1

- Last updated: October 19, 2019

== Honors and awards ==
=== Goal of the Week ===
Week	Position	Player	Opponent	Ref
11	FW	(United States) Justin Dhillon	Reno 1868 FC	

=== Team of the Week ===
Week	Position	Player	Ref
1	Bench	(United States) Shandon Hopeau	
11	Bench	(United States) Trey Muse	
12	Bench	(United States) Shandon Hopeau	
13	Bench	(United States) Justin Dhillon	
26	FW	(United States) Justin Dhillon	
26	Bench	(United States) Shandon Hopeau	
31	FW	(United States) Justin Dhillon	
31	Bench	(United States) Alfonso Ocampo-Chavez	
33	GK	(United States) Trey Muse	

=== USL 20 under 20 ===
Rank	Position	Player	Age	Ref
8	MF	(United States) Danny Leyva	16	
17	FW	(United States) Alfonso Ocampo-Chavez	17	

== Transfers ==
For transfers in, dates listed are when Tacoma Defiance officially signed the players to the roster. Transactions where only the rights to the players are acquired are not listed. For transfers out, dates listed are when Defiance officially removed the players from its roster, not when they signed with another club. If a player later signed with another club, his new club will be noted, but the date listed here remains the one when he was officially removed from Tacoma Defiance roster.

=== In ===
No.	Pos.	Player	Transferred from	Fee/notes	Date	Source
48	FW	(Puerto Rico) Alec Díaz	(United States) Sounders Academy via Pacific Northwest Soccer Club	Signed for 2019 roster	October 2, 2018	
49	FW	(United States) Danny Robles	(United States) Sounders Academy via Pacific Northwest Soccer Club	Signed for 2019 roster	October 2, 2018	
40	MF	(United States) Danny Leyva	(United States) Sounders Academy via Barcelona USA Academy	Signed for 2019 roster	October 16, 2018	
73	DF	(The Gambia) Modou Ndow	(Czech Republic) On loan from MFK Vyškov	Signed for 2019 roster	December 21, 2018	
78	MF	(Democratic Republic of the Congo) Ben Numbi	(Czech Republic) On loan from MFK Vyškov	Signed for 2019 roster	December 21, 2018	
84	MF	(United States) Josh Atencio	(United States) Sounders Academy	Signed for 2019 roster	January 22, 2019	
71	DF	(United States) Aleks Berkolds	(United States) San Diego State	Sounders MLS SuperDraft 3rd Round Pick (#68)	March 4, 2019	
88	DF	(United States) Matt Nance	(United States) Xavier University		March 4, 2019	
72	MF	(Sweden) Joel Rydstrand	(United States) Creighton University	Sounders MLS SuperDraft 2nd Round Pick (#44)	March 4, 2019	
99	FW	(United States) Justin Dhillon	(United States) LA Galaxy II	free	March 15, 2019	
96	DF	(Mexico) Everardo Rubio	(Mexico) Murciélagos F.C. B		May 31, 2019	
90	MF	(Mexico) Herbert Robinson García	(Mexico) Coyotes de Tlaxcala		September 6, 2019	
	DF	(France) Abdoulaye Cissoko	(United States) San Diego Zest FC	Signed and then loaned to San Diego 1904 FC through 2019	September 6, 2019	

=== Out ===
No.	Pos.	Player	Transferred to	Fee/notes	Date	Source
96	DF	(United States) Jalen Markey	(United States) Miami FC	Option declined	November 14, 2018	
34	DF	(Nigeria) Ibrahim Usman		Option declined	November 14, 2018	
71	FW	(United States) David Olsen		Out of contract	November 14, 2018	
92	DF	(Cameroon) Rodrigue Ele		Out of contract	November 14, 2018	
77	MF	(Panama) Francisco Narbón	(Panama) Plaza Amador	Out of contract	November 14, 2018	
74	FW	(Mexico) David Estrada	(United States) New Mexico United	Released granted	December 18, 2018	
75	MF	(United States) Danny Leyva	(United States) Seattle Sounders FC	Signed Homegrown Player contract with first team	April 9, 2019	
87	FW	(United States) Alfonso Ocampo-Chavez	(United States) Seattle Sounders FC	Signed Homegrown Player contract with first team	May 1, 2019	
99	FW	(United States) Justin Dhillon	(United States) Seattle Sounders FC	Signed contract with first team	June 28, 2019	
72	MF	(Sweden) Joel Rydstrand	(Spain) San Roque	Released granted	August 27, 2019	
