= 2020 Portland Timbers 2 season =

Portland Timbers 2
2020 season
- Head coach: Cameron Knowles
- Stadium: Hillsboro Stadium; Hillsboro, Oregon (Capacity: 7,600 (expandable to 10,000))
- USL Championship: Group A: 4th Conference: 18th Overall: 34th
- USL Championship Playoffs: Did not qualify
- Biggest win: POR 3–0 TAC (Sept. 9)
- Biggest defeat: RNO 7–1 POR (Sept. 5)

The 2020 Portland Timbers 2 season was the sixth season for Portland Timbers 2 in the USL Championship, the second-tier professional soccer league in the United States and Canada.

== Competitions ==
=== Preseason ===
Win Draw Loss Upcoming fixture

=== USL Championship ===
==== Standings — Group A ====
Pos	Team	Pld	W	D	L	GF	GA	GD	Pts	PPG	Qualification
1	Reno 1868 FC	16	11	3	2	43	21	+22	36	2.25	Advance to USL Championship Playoffs
2	Sacramento Republic FC	16	8	6	2	27	17	+10	30	1.88	Advance to USL Championship Playoffs
3	Tacoma Defiance	16	4	2	10	25	32	−7	14	0.88	
4	Portland Timbers 2	16	3	0	13	20	50	−30	9	0.56	

Source: USL

==== Results summary ====
March 7 1	Phoenix Rising FC	6–1	Portland Timbers 2	Scottsdale, Arizona
7:30 PM PDT	Dadashov 13', 24', 65'; Flemmings 31'; Lambert (yellow card) 75'; Whelan (yellow card) 85'; Kunga 90'; Asante 90+3'	Report; Report	Conechny 45+2'; Bonilla (yellow card) 79'	Stadium: Casino Arizona Field; Attendance: 6,585; Referee: Jonathan Bilinski

July 18 2	Tacoma Defiance	3–0	Portland Timbers 2	Tacoma, Washington
7:00 PM PDT	Diaz 14'; Kitahara (yellow card) 21'; Burke-Gilroy (yellow card) 52'; Robles 58'; Reynolds (yellow card) 60'; Pérez 64'; Baker-Whiting (yellow card) 80'	Report	Ornstil (yellow card) 45'; Velásquez (yellow card) 60'; Krolicki (yellow card) 60'; Clapier (yellow card) 74'	Stadium: Cheney Stadium; Referee: Adorae Monroy

July 29 3	Portland Timbers 2	1–4	Reno 1868 FC	Portland, Oregon
7:30 PM PDT	Kiner (yellow card) 55'; Ornstil (yellow card) 68' (yellow-red card) 83'; Dúran 73'; Anguiano (yellow card) 81'	Report	François 40', 90' (pen.); Alfaro (yellow card) 44'; Rivas 52'; Richards (yellow card) 59'; Langsdorf 82'	Stadium: Providence Park; Referee: Farhad Dadkho

August 3 4	Portland Timbers 2	0–4	Tacoma Defiance	Portland, Oregon
6:00 PM PDT	Dúran (yellow card) 30'; Anguiano (yellow card) 45'; Calixtro (yellow card) 73'	Report	Diaz 23', 47'; Mueller 40', (yellow card) 53'; Daley (yellow card) 70'; Pérez 72'; Ocampo-Chavez (yellow card) 90'	Stadium: Providence Park; Referee: Isaiah Vlad

August 8 5	Portland Timbers 2	0–1	Sacramento Republic	Portland, Oregon
7:00 PM PDT	Molloy (yellow card) 52'; Krolicki (yellow card) 54'; Hanson (yellow card) 84'	Report	Leeker 12' (o.g.); Mahoney (yellow card) 82' (yellow-red card) 90+2'; Sargis (yellow card) 90+6'	Stadium: Providence Park; Referee: Adorae Monroy

August 15 6	Reno 1868 FC	5–2	Portland Timbers 2	Reno, Nevada
7:30 PM PDT	Hertzog 25', 45+1'; Rivas 28', (yellow card) 69'; Bone 38'; Langsdorf 64'	Report	Gonzalez 72'; Kiner (yellow card) 73' (yellow-red card) 90+1'; Epps 76'; Ornstil (yellow card) 74'	Stadium: Greater Nevada Field; Referee: Elijio Arreguin

August 22 7	Sacramento Republic FC	2–1	Portland Timbers 2	Sacramento, California
TBA PM PDT	Lopez (yellow card) 45+2'; Skundrich 60'; Iwasa 69'; Apollon (yellow card) 82'	Report	González Asensi 23'; Molloy (yellow card) 75'	Stadium: Papa Murphy's Park; Referee: Nicholas Marin

August 26 8	Portland Timbers 2	2–3	LA Galaxy II	Portland, Oregon
5:00 PM PDT	Stanley (yellow card) 52'; Ornstil 69'; Molloy 90+9'	Report	Williams 13', (yellow card) 60', (goal) 90+5'; Alvarado Jr. (yellow card) 21'; Saldana (yellow card) 40'; Neal (yellow card) 72'; Perez 78'	Stadium: Providence Park; Referee: Farhad Dadkho

August 30 9	Portland Timbers 2	v	Tacoma Defiance	Portland, Oregon
6:00 PM PDT				Stadium: Providence Park
Note: Match postponed due to positive covid-19 test in the Timbers 2 organization.

September 2 10	Portland Timbers 2	1–2	Sacramento Republic	Portland, Oregon
12:00 PM PDT	Epps (yellow card) 80'; Clapier 90+2'	Report	Skundrich (yellow card) 49'; Lopez (yellow card) 72'; Gomez (yellow card) 81'; Penagos 87'; Chavez 90+6'	Stadium: Providence Park; Referee: Farhad Dadkho

September 5 11	Reno 1868 FC	7–1	Portland Timbers 2	Reno, Nevada
7:00 PM PDT	Bone 2', 11'; Hertzog 20' (pen.); Langsdorf 35'; François 49'; Richards 65'; Kikanovic 77'	Report	Anguiano (red card) 55'; Clapier 74'	Stadium: Greater Nevada Field; Referee: Ricardo Fierro

September 9 9	Portland Timbers 2	3–0	Tacoma Defiance	Portland, Oregon
6:00 PM PDT	Gonzalez 18', 24'; Calixtro 21' (pen.); Ornstil (yellow card) 80'	Report	Fernandez (yellow card) 68'	Stadium: Providence Park; Referee: Baboucarr Jallow
Note: Re-schedule of postponed August 30 match.

September 12 12	Portland Timbers 2	P–P	Tacoma Defiance	Portland, Oregon
TBA PM PDT				Stadium: Providence Park
Note: Match postponed due to air quality in Portland.

September 16 13	Real Monarchs	1–2	Portland Timbers 2	Herriman, Utah
TBA PM PDT	Coffee 28'; Jasso (yellow card) 53'	Report	Epps 60', (yellow card) 86'; González Asensi 79'; Molloy (yellow card) 85'	Stadium: Zions Bank Stadium; Referee: Malik Badawi

September 20 14	Portland Timbers 2	2–5	Reno 1868 FC	Portland, Oregon
6:00 PM PDT	Ornstil (yellow card) 45+4'; Epps 57'; González Asensi 79'	Report	François 19', 81'; Langsdorf 37'; Gleadle 45'; Apodaca 88'	Stadium: Providence Park; Referee: Brandon Stevis

September 24 12	Portland Timbers 2	3–1	Tacoma Defiance	Portland, Oregon
7:00 PM PDT	González Asensi 12', 75' (pen.); Hanson (yellow card) 35'; Epps 49'	Report	Robles 47'	Stadium: Providence Park; Referee: Baboucarr Jallow
Note: Re-schedule of postponed Sept. 12 match.

September 27 15	Tacoma Defiance	2–1	Portland Timbers 2	Tacoma, Washington
1:30 PM PDT	Dobbelaere 28'; Hegardt (yellow card) 76'; Gonzalez 85'	Report	Anguiano (yellow card) 43'; Velásquez (yellow card) 45+1'; Hanson (yellow card) 62'; Stanley (yellow card) 71'; Gonzalez 88' (o.g.)	Stadium: Cheney Stadium; Referee: Farhad Dadkho

October 3 16	Sacramento Republic FC	4–0	Portland Timbers 2	Sacramento, California
7:30 PM PDT	Formella 2', 4'; Villarreal 9', (yellow card) 42'; Belmar (yellow card) 16'; McCrary (yellow card) 22'; Bijev 25'; Keinan (yellow card) 67'; Barahona (yellow card) 85'; F. López (yellow card) 90'	Report	Hanson (yellow card) 45+4'; Krolicki (yellow card) 45+6'	Stadium: Papa Murphy's Park; Referee: Nicholas Marin

=== U.S. Open Cup ===
Due to their ownership by a higher division professional club (Portland Timbers), Timbers 2 is one of 15 teams expressly forbidden from entering the Cup competition.
