= 2021 Tacoma Defiance season =

Tacoma Defiance
2021 season
- Head coach: Wade Webber
- Stadium: Cheney Stadium
- Highest home attendance: League: 1,993 (9/22 v. SAC)
- Lowest home attendance: League: 811 (10/13 v. LV)
- Average home league attendance: League: 1,118
- Biggest win: OC 0–3 TAC (8/18); TAC 4–1 OC (10/9)
- Biggest defeat: PHX 3–0 TAC (6/12)
Home colors	Away colors

The 2021 Tacoma Defiance season was the seventh season of the Tacoma Defiance, an American soccer team that played in the USL Championship, the second tier of soccer in the country. It was the fourth season since the club was renamed from Seattle Sounders FC 2 and relocated to Tacoma, Washington. Defiance is majority owned by Seattle Sounders FC, a Major League Soccer team, and serves as their reserve and development squad.

== Roster ==
Note: Flags indicate national team as defined under FIFA eligibility rules; some limited exceptions apply. Players may hold more than one non-FIFA nationality. Squad correct as of August 11, 2021.

No.	Pos.	Nation	Player
18	GK	USA	Spencer Richey
26	GK	USA	Andrew Thomas
31	GK	USA	Christian Herrera
32	FW	PUR	Alec Díaz
34	MF	USA	Danny Robles
35	DF	USA	Alex Villanueva
36	DF	USA	Issa Rayyan
39	MF	USA	Marlon Vargas
41	DF	USA	Cody Baker
43	MF	USA	Sota Kitahara
45	MF	USA	Ethan Dobbelaere
49	MF	USA	Reed Baker-Whiting
72	DF	USA	Eric Kinzner
73	MF	USA	Obed Vargas
74	DF	USA	Taylor Mueller
75	MF	USA	Danny Leyva
80	MF	USA	Ray Serrano
81	DF	USA	Randy Mendoza
82	DF	USA	Joe Hafferty
87	FW	USA	Alfonso Ocampo-Chavez
88	MF	USA	Carlos Anguiano
92	DF	FRA	Abdoulaye Cissoko
94	DF	COL	Jimmy Medranda
97	MF	USA	Juan Alvarez
98	FW	USA	Samuel Adeniran
99	MF	USA	Tom Brewitt

1. Signed to first team contract with Sounders FC.
2. Sounders FC Academy player.

=== Out on loan ===
Note: Flags indicate national team as defined under FIFA eligibility rules; some limited exceptions apply. Players may hold more than one non-FIFA nationality. Squad correct as of August 28, 2021.

No.	Pos.	Nation	Player
38	MF	USA	Azriel Gonzalez (On loan to FC Edmonton)

== Competitions ==
=== Preseason ===
March 25, 2021 Closed-door scrimmage	Seattle Sounders FC	–	Tacoma Defiance	Tukwilla, WA
				Stadium: Starfire Sports

=== Friendlies ===
	–
(PDT)

=== USL regular season ===
==== Results summary ====
Overall								Home						Away					
Pld	W	D	L	GF	GA	GD	Pts	W	D	L	GF	GA	GD	W	D	L	GF	GA	GD
32	10	9	13	37	41	−4	39	8	4	4	24	16	+8	2	5	9	13	25	−12

Last updated: October 30, 2021.
Source: USL Championship, Soccerway

==== Results by matchday ====
Matchday	1	2	3	4	5	6	7	8	9	10	11	12	13	14	15	16	17	18	19	20	21	22	23	24	25	26	27	28	29	30	31	32
Stadium	A	H	H	A	A	A	A	H	H	A	A	A	H	H	H	H	A	A	A	H	H	A	A	H	H	A	H	H	A	H	H	A
Result	D	W	W	L	L	L	L	D	W	L	D	D	W	D	D	W	W	W	L	W	L	L	L	L	L	L	W	L	D	D	W	D

Source: USL Championship
A = Away; H = Home; W = Win; D = Draw; L = Loss

==== Matches ====
Win Draw Loss Upcoming fixture

May 9, 2021 USL 1	LA Galaxy II	1–1	Tacoma Defiance	Carson, California
(PDT)	Gonzalez (yellow card) 13'; Vazquez (yellow card) 48'; Hernandez 78'; Lambe (yellow card) 80'	Report	Mueller (yellow card) 35'; O. Vargas (yellow card) 37'; Rayyan (yellow card) 63'; Anguiano (yellow card) 77'; Cissoko 90+6' (pen.)	Stadium: Dignity Health Sports Park; Referee: Ricardo Fierro

May 13, 2021 USL 2	Tacoma Defiance	3–1	San Diego Loyal SC	Tacoma, Washington
7:00 PM (PDT)	Villanueva (yellow card) 22'; Kinzner (yellow card) 36'; Anguiano 44'; Kitahara (yellow card) 66'; Díaz 73'; Mendoza (yellow card) 75'; Serrano (yellow card) 89'; Robles 90+3'	Report	Metcalf 51'; Vancaeyezeele (yellow card) 61'; Martin (yellow card) 90+2'	Stadium: Cheney Stadium; Attendance: 1,222; Referee: Chris Ruska

May 16, 2021 USL 3	Tacoma Defiance	1–0	Orange County SC	Tacoma, Washington
(PDT)	Ocampo-Chavez 21', (yellow card) 63'; Mendoza (yellow card) 75'	Report	Kiernan (yellow card) 56'; Kuningas (yellow card) 63'; Wehan (yellow card) 68'; McCabe (yellow card) 83'	Stadium: Cheney Stadium; Attendance: 1,214; Referee: Mark Allatin

June 5, 2021 USL 5	Las Vegas Lights FC	2–0	Tacoma Defiance	Las Vegas, Nevada
7:30 pm (PDT)	Jennings 19'; Duke (yellow card) 56', (goal) 74'	Report	Kinzner (yellow card) 49'	Stadium: Cashman Field; Referee: Joseph Salinas

June 12, 2021 USL 6	Phoenix Rising FC	3–0	Tacoma Defiance	Chandler, Arizona
7:30 pm (PDT)	Asante 40', 55'; Calistri (yellow card) 48'; Schmitt 80'; Kelly (yellow card) 89'	Report		Stadium: Wild Horse Pass; Attendance: 7,316; Referee: Malik Badawi

June 16, 2021 USL 7	Colorado Springs Switchbacks FC	4–2	Tacoma Defiance	Colorado Springs, Colorado
7:30 pm (PDT)	Ngalina 32', 89'; Beckford 36'; Barry 80'; Anderson (yellow card) 82'	Report	M. Vargas 11'; Brewitt (yellow card) 66'; Díaz 85'	Stadium: Weidner Field; Attendance: 5,164; Referee: John Griggs

June 23, 2021 USL 8	Tacoma Defiance	1–1	Real Monarchs	Tacoma, Washington
7:00 pm (PDT)	Kinzner (yellow card) 45+1'; O. Vargas (yellow card) 49'; Anguiano (yellow card) 64'; Mueller (yellow card) 72'; Mendoza (yellow card) 83'; Adeniran 90+1'	Report	Johnson 8'; Powder (yellow card) 18'; Conteh (yellow card) 34'; Iloski (yellow card) 54'	Stadium: Cheney Stadium; Attendance: 857; Referee: Ricardo Fierro

June 27, 2021 USL 9	Tacoma Defiance	2–0	LA Galaxy II	Tacoma, Washington
1:30 pm (PDT)	Serrano 52', 60'	Report	Harvey (yellow card) 41'	Stadium: Cheney Stadium; Attendance: 924; Referee: Luis Guardia

July 3, 2021 USL 10	Las Vegas Lights FC	1–0	Tacoma Defiance	Las Vegas, Nevada
7:30 pm (PDT)	Musovski 5'; Uche (yellow card) 48'; Traore (yellow card) 82'	Report	Rayyan (yellow card) 67'; Anguiano (yellow card) 77'; Mendoza (yellow card) 88'	Stadium: Cashman Field; Referee: Gerald Flores

July 6, 2021 USL 11	Orange County SC	0–0	Tacoma Defiance	Irvine, California
7:00 pm (PDT)	Smith (yellow card) 52'; Markkanen (yellow card) 65'; Wehan (yellow card) 87'; Cavillo (yellow card) 90+1'	Report	Anguiano (yellow card) 41'; Díaz (yellow card) 88'; Gonzalez (yellow card) 90+3'	Stadium: Championship Soccer Stadium; Attendance: 2,454; Referee: Chris Ruska

July 11, 2021 USL 12	LA Galaxy II	1–1	Tacoma Defiance	Carson, California
17:00	Drack (yellow card) 44'; Mendoza 55' (o.g.)	Report	Ocampo-Chavez 16'; Robles (yellow card) 78'	Stadium: Dignity Health Sports Park; Referee: Mark Allatin

July 29, 2021 USL 13	Tacoma Defiance	2–1	San Diego Loyal SC	Tacoma, Washington
7:00 pm (PDT)	Brewitt (yellow card) 45'; Gonzalez 50'; Anguiano 65'; Kinzner (red card) 88'	Report	Adams (yellow card) 20'; Moshobane 55'; Stoneman (yellow card) 59'; Hackworth (red card) 88'	Stadium: Cheney Stadium; Attendance: 970; Referee: Elton Garcia

August 1, 2021 USL 14	Tacoma Defiance	0–0	New Mexico United	Tacoma, Washington
1:30 pm (PDT)	Mendoza (yellow card) 7'	Report	Moreno (yellow card) 5'; Yearwood (yellow card) 41'; Beigl (yellow card) 68'	Stadium: Cheney Stadium; Attendance: 1,317; Referee: Matthew Franz

August 5, 2021 USL 15	Tacoma Defiance	1–1	Sacramento Republic FC	Tacoma, Washington
7:00 pm (PDT)	Villanueva (yellow card) 59'; Mendoza 82'; Anguiano (yellow card) 90+2'	Report	Kiesewetter 18'; Alashe (yellow card) 65'; Pennanen (yellow card) 90+1'	Stadium: Cheney Stadium; Attendance: 926; Referee: Joshua Encarnación

August 8, 2021 USL 16	Tacoma Defiance	3–1	Oakland Roots SC	Tacoma, Washington
1:30 pm (PDT)	Adeniran 25', 45+1' (pen.); Alvarez 45+4'; Mendoza (yellow card) 77'	Report	Hernández (yellow card) 45'; Enríquez (yellow card) 50'; Fall 55'	Stadium: Cheney Stadium; Attendance: 1,007; Referee: Adorae Monroy

August 14, 2021 USL 17	San Diego Loyal SC	1–2	Tacoma Defiance	San Diego, California
17:00	Hertzog 21', (yellow card) 31'; Martin (yellow card) 25'	Report	Ragen (yellow card) 27'; Mueller (yellow card) 35'; Brewitt (yellow card) 36'; Herrera (yellow card) 41'; Villanueva 65'; Serrano (yellow card) 67'; Anguiano 71'	Stadium: Torero Stadium; Attendance: 3,310; Referee: Matthew Corrigan

August 18, 2021 USL 18	Orange County SC	0–3	Tacoma Defiance	Irvine, California
7:00 pm (PDT)	Powers (yellow card) 43'; Alston (yellow card) 51'; Mines (yellow card) 82'	Report	Herrera (yellow card) 12'; Ragen 17'; Anguiano (yellow card) 24'; Adeniran 44'; M. Vargas 90'	Stadium: Championship Soccer Stadium; Attendance: 2,111; Referee: Kevin Broadley

August 28, 2021 USL 19	Oakland Roots SC	3–1	Tacoma Defiance	Livermore, California
7:30 PM PDT (UTC-07)	Greene (yellow card) 5', (goal) 13'; Fall (penalty missed) 54'; Mbumba 57'; Bokila 82', (yellow card) 90'	Report	Ragen (yellow card) 18'; Brewitt 45+3'; Mueller (yellow card) 72'; Anguiano (yellow card) 84'	Stadium: Las Positas College; Attendance: 4,118; Referee: Elijio Arreguin

September 2, 2021 USL 20	Tacoma Defiance	2–1	Las Vegas Lights FC	Tacoma, Washington
7:00 pm (PDT)	Brewitt 36', (yellow card) 66'; Adeniran 86'; Anguiano (yellow card) 89'	Report	Iloski 62'	Stadium: Cheney Stadium; Attendance: 844; Referee: Lorenzo Hernandez

September 5, 2021 USL 21	Tacoma Defiance	1–3	Phoenix Rising FC	Tacoma, Washington
1:30 pm (PDT)	Adeniran 35', (yellow card) 83'; Atencio (yellow card) 37' (yellow-red card) 59'; Herrera (yellow card) 89'	Report	Mattocks 4', 32'; King (yellow card) 35'; Musa (yellow card) 42'; Lambert (yellow card) 80'; Schmitt (yellow card) 80'; Moar 90' (pen.)	Stadium: Cheney Stadium; Attendance: 1,185; Referee: Lorenzo Hernandez

September 15, 2021 USL 22	Oakland Roots SC	3–1	Tacoma Defiance	Livermore, California
8:00 PM PDT (UTC-07)	Mfeka 10', 53'; Fall 40', (yellow card) 51'; Takahashi (yellow card) 77'; Hernández (yellow card) 87'	Report	Serrano 32'; Brewitt (yellow card) 49'; Villanueva (yellow card) 70'	Stadium: Las Positas College; Referee: Corbyn May

September 19, 2021 USL 23	San Diego Loyal SC	1–0	Tacoma Defiance	San Diego, California
17:00	Yaro 31'	Report	Adeniran (yellow card) 82'	Stadium: Torero Stadium; Attendance: 3,800; Referee: Brandon Stevis

September 22, 2021 USL 24	Tacoma Defiance	0–1	Sacramento Republic FC	Tacoma, Washington
7:00 pm (PDT)	Serrano (yellow card) 2'; Ragen (yellow card) 37'; M. Vargas (yellow card) 65'; Brewitt (yellow card) 90'	Report	Weah (yellow card) 45'; Fernandes (yellow card) 58'; Casey (yellow card) 69'; Formella 78'; Kibunguchy (yellow card) 90+1'	Stadium: Cheney Stadium; Attendance: 1,993; Referee: Mark Allatin

September 25, 2021 USL 25	Tacoma Defiance	1–2	Phoenix Rising FC	Tacoma, Washington
7:00 pm (PDT)	Serrano (yellow card) 43'; Adeniran 80'	Report	Bakero 78'; Moar 90', (yellow card) 90+3'	Stadium: Cheney Stadium; Attendance: 1,370; Referee: Brad Jensen

October 2, 2021 USL 26	Sacramento Republic FC	3–1	Tacoma Defiance	Sacramento, California
7:30 PM PDT (UTC-07)	Iwasa 8'; Formella (yellow card) 43'; Fernandes (yellow card) 59', (goal) 77'; Cuello 66'	Report	Robles (yellow card) 30'; Villanueva 72'; Adeniran (yellow card) 79'	Stadium: Heart Health Park; Attendance: 9,168; Referee: Ricardo Fierro

October 6, 2021 USL 4	Austin Bold FC	1–0	Tacoma Defiance	Austin, Texas
6:00 PM (PDT)	Gordon 62'; Okugo (yellow card) 78'	Report		Stadium: Bold Stadium; Attendance: 1,144; Referee: Luis Guardia
Note: Rescheduled from May 30, 2021, following an earlier postponement due to inclement weather.

October 9, 2021 USL 27	Tacoma Defiance	4–1	Orange County SC	Tacoma, Washington
7:00 PM (PDT)	Kinzner (yellow card) 4'; Adeniran 46', 52', 90+3'; Díaz 90'	Report	Calvillo (yellow card) 41'; Mines 60'; Powers (yellow card) 77'	Stadium: Cheney Stadium; Attendance: 942; Referee: John Matto

October 13, 2021 USL 28	Tacoma Defiance	0–1	Las Vegas Lights FC	Tacoma, Washington
7:00 pm (PDT)		Report	El-mesmari 46'; Molina (yellow card) 81'	Stadium: Cheney Stadium; Attendance: 811; Referee: Matthew Thompson

October 17, 2021 USL 29	Sacramento Republic FC	0–0	Tacoma Defiance	Sacramento, California
2:00 PM PDT (UTC-07)	Foster (yellow card) 15'; Iwasa (yellow card) 72'; Fernandes (yellow card) 89'	Report	Mendoza (yellow card) 42'	Stadium: Heart Health Park; Attendance: 9,983; Referee: Brandon Stevis

October 20, 2021 USL 30	Tacoma Defiance	0–0	Oakland Roots SC	Tacoma, Washington
1:30 pm (PDT)		Report	Amarikwa (yellow card) 41'; Ornstil (yellow card) 90'; Mbumba (yellow card) 90+2'	Stadium: Cheney Stadium; Attendance: 833; Referee: Malik Badawi

October 24, 2021 USL 31	Tacoma Defiance	3–2	LA Galaxy II	Tacoma, Washington
1:30 PM	Serrano 10', (yellow card) 74'; Mueller (yellow card) 45+2'; Adeniran 54', 70'; Brewitt (yellow card) 89'	Report	Hernandez (yellow card) 17'; Judd 63', 73'	Stadium: Starfire Sports Complex; Attendance: 1,475; Referee: Matthew Corrigan

October 30, 2021 USL 32	Phoenix Rising FC	1–1	Tacoma Defiance	Chandler, Arizona
7:30 PM	Rodríguez 70'; Schmitt (yellow card) 88'; Lambert (yellow card) 89'	Report	Adeniran 30', (yellow card) 80'; Vargas (yellow card) 38'; Brewitt (yellow card) 71'; Mueller (yellow card) 90+3'	Stadium: Phoenix Rising Soccer Complex at Wild Horse Pass; Attendance: 7,436; Referee: Luis Arroyo

=== U.S. Open Cup ===
Due to their ownership by a higher division professional club (Seattle Sounders FC), Tacoma is one of 15 teams expressly forbidden from entering the Cup competition.

== Statistics ==
=== Appearances and goals ===
Numbers after plus-sign(+) denote appearances as a substitute.

No.	Pos	Nat	Player	Total		Regular season		Playoffs	
No.	Pos	Nat	Player	Apps	Goals	Apps	Goals	Apps	Goals
30	GK	(United States) USA	Stefan Cleveland	1	0	1	0	0	0
32	FW	(Puerto Rico) PUR	Alec Díaz	1	0	0+1	0	0	0
34	MF	(United States) USA	Danny Robles	0	0	0	0	0	0
35	DF	(United States) USA	Alex Villanueva	1	0	1	0	0	0
36	DF	(United States) USA	Issa Rayyan	1	0	1	0	0	0
38	MF	(United States) USA	Azriel Gonzalez	1	0	1	0	0	0
39	MF	(United States) USA	Marlon Vargas	1	0	1	0	0	0
72	DF	(United States) USA	Eric Kinzner	1	0	0+1	0	0	0
64	GK	(United States) USA	Christian Herrera	0	0	0	0	0	0
74	DF	(United States) USA	Taylor Mueller	1	0	1	0	0	0
76	MF	(United States) USA	Reed Baker-Whiting	1	0	1	0	0	0
77	MF	(United States) USA	Sota Kitahara	0	0	0	0	0	0
80	MF	(United States) USA	Ray Serrano	1	0	0+1	0	0	0
80	MF	(United States) USA	Carlos Anguiano	0	0	0	0	0	0
81	DF	(United States) USA	Randy Mendoza	1	0	0+1	0	0	0
92	DF	(France) FRA	Abdoulaye Cissoko	1	1	1	1	0	0
97	FW	(United States) USA	Juan Alvarez	1	0	1	0	0	0
	MF	(United States) USA	Joe Hafferty	0	0	0	0	0	0
	MF	(United States) USA	Obed Vargas	0	0	0	0	0	0
	FW	(United States) USA	Samuel Adeniran	0	0	0	0	0	0

- Last updated: May 10, 2020

=== Top scorers ===
Rank	Position	Number	Name	Regular season	Playoffs	Total

- Last updated: October 26, 2020

=== Top assists ===
Rank	Position	Number	Name	Regular Season	Playoffs	Total

- Last updated: October 26, 2020

=== Disciplinary record ===
No.	Pos	Player	Regular Season			Playoffs			Total		
No.	Pos	Player	Booked	(yellow card) (yellow-red card)	Sent off (straight red)	Booked	(yellow card) (yellow-red card)	Sent off (straight red)	Booked	(yellow card) (yellow-red card)	Sent off (straight red)
32	FW	(Puerto Rico) Alec Díaz	1	0	0	0	0	0	1	0	0
34	MF	(United States) Danny Robles	1	0	0	0	0	0	1	0	0
36	DF	(United States) Issa Rayyan	2	0	0	0	0	0	2	0	0
38	MF	(United States) Azriel Gonzalez	1	0	0	0	0	0	1	0	0
45	DF	(United States) Alex Villanueva	1	0	0	0	0	0	1	0	0
72	DF	(United States) Eric Kinzner	3	0	0	0	0	0	3	0	0
73	MF	(United States) Obed Vargas	2	0	0	0	0	0	2	0	0
74	DF	(United States) Taylor Mueller	2	0	0	0	0	0	2	0	0
77	MF	(United States) Sota Kitahara	1	0	0	0	0	0	1	0	0
80	MF	(United States) Ray Serrano	1	0	0	0	0	0	1	0	0
81	DF	(United States) Randy Mendoza	4	0	0	0	0	0	4	0	0
87	MF	(United States) Alfonso Ocampo-Chavez	1	0	0	0	0	0	1	0	0
88	MF	(United States) Carlos Anguiano	4	0	0	0	0	0	4	0	0
99	MF	(England) Tom Brewitt	1	0	0	0	0	0	1	0	0
Total			25	0	0	0	0	0	25	0	0

- Last updated: July 11, 2021

== Honors and awards ==
=== Team of the Week ===
Week	Player	Opponent	Position	Ref
3	(France) Abdoulaye Cissoko	LA Galaxy II	DF	
4	(United States) Issa Rayyan	San Diego Loyal SC	DF	
10	(United States) Ray Serrano	LA Galaxy II	MF	

== Transfers ==
For transfers in, dates listed are when Tacoma Defiance officially signed the players to the roster. Transactions where only the rights to the players are acquired are not listed. For transfers out, dates listed are when Defiance officially removed the players from its roster, not when they signed with another club. If a player later signed with another club, his new club will be noted, but the date listed here remains the one when he was officially removed from Tacoma Defiance roster.

=== In ===
No.	Pos.	Player	Transferred from	Fee/notes	Date	Source
43	MF	(United States) Sota Kitahara	(United States) Sounders FC Academy		December 15, 2020	
64	GK	(United States) Christian Herrera	(United States) Oakland Roots SC		December 15, 2020	
66	MF	(United States) Carlos Anguiano	(United States) Portland Timbers 2		December 15, 2020	
98	FW	(United States) Samuel Adeniran	(Germany) Atlas Delmenhorst		March 15, 2021	
99	MF	(England) Tom Brewitt	(England) Morecambe FC		March 15, 2021	
81	DF	(United States) Randy Mendoza	(United States) Stumptown AC		March 15, 2021	
36	DF	(United States) Issa Rayyan	(United States) Philadelphia Union II		March 15, 2021	
82	DF	(United States) Joe Hafferty	(United States) Sounders FC Academy		May 16, 2021	

=== Out ===
No.	Pos.	Player	Transferred to	Fee/notes	Date	Source
87	FW	(United States) Alfonso Ocampo-Chavez	(United States) Seattle Sounders FC	Returned via season ending loan	October 4, 2020	
45	MF	(United States) Ethan Dobbelaere	(United States) Seattle Sounders FC	Returned via season ending loan	October 4, 2020	
65	GK	(United States) Eric Klenofsky	(Canada) Toronto FC II	Returned via season ending loan	October 4, 2020	
31	DF	(United States) Nick Hinds	(United States) Nashville SC	Option declined	October 5, 2020	
97	MF	(United States) Collin Fernandez	(United States) Austin Bold FC	Option declined	December 15, 2020	
98	MF	(England) Antonee Burke-Gilroy	(Australia) Altona Magic SC	Option declined	December 15, 2020	
81	DF	(England) Danny Reynolds	(United States) Southern States SC	Option declined	December 15, 2020	
90	MF	(United States) Chino Pérez	(Republic of Ireland) Dundalk	Option declined	December 15, 2020	
33	DF	(United States) Sam Rogers	(United States) OKC Energy FC	Out of contract	December 15, 2020	
21	MF	(United States) Reed Baker-Whiting	(United States) Seattle Sounders FC	Homegrown player signing	May 11, 2021	
92	GK	(France) Abdoulaye Cissoko	(United States) Seattle Sounders FC	Homegrown player signing	May 21, 2021	
38	MF	(United States) Azriel Gonzalez	(Canada) FC Edmonton	On loan until the end of season	August 11, 2021	
