= Danny Leyva =

American soccer player (born 2003)

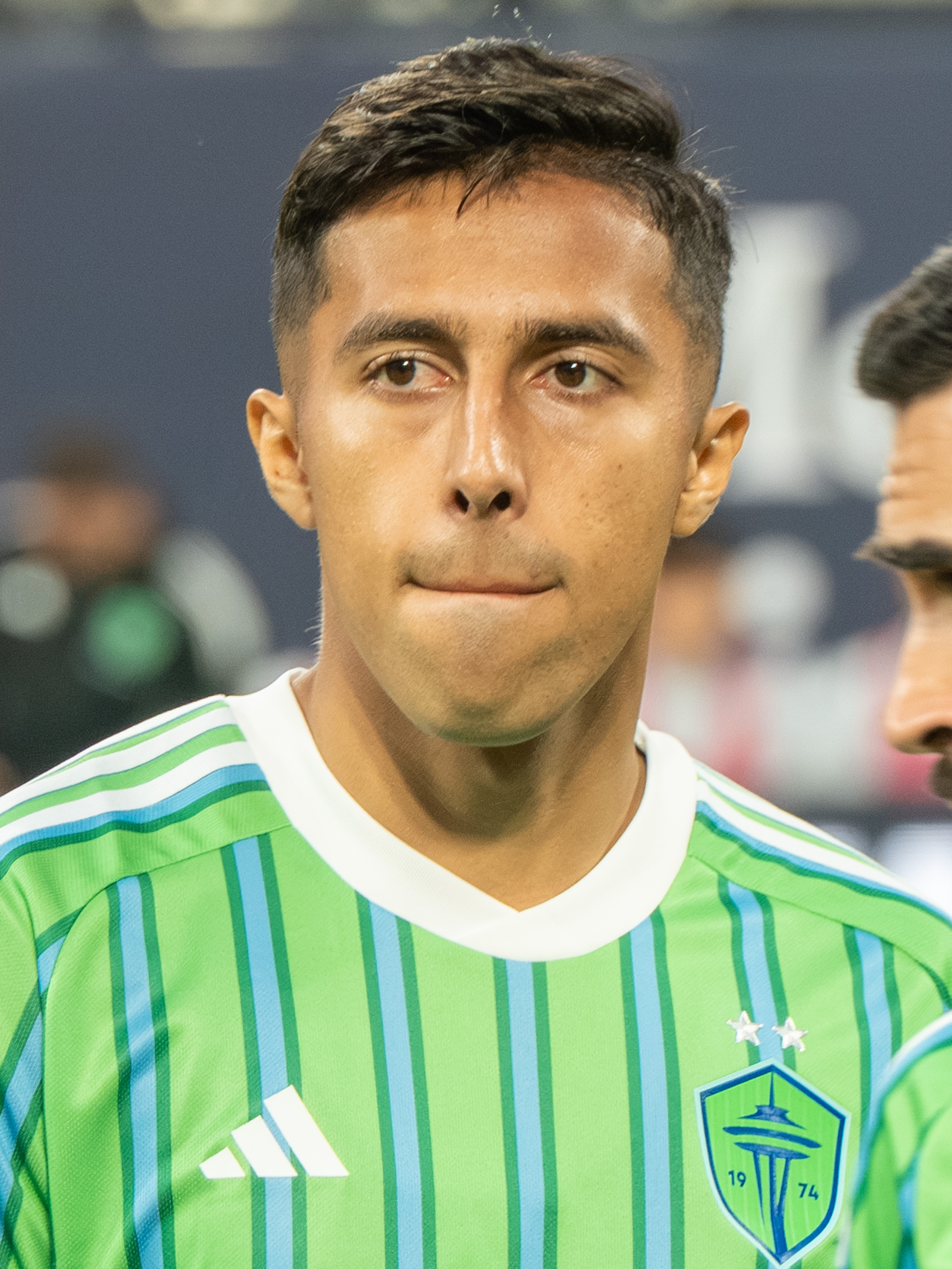
- Leyva with the Seattle Sounders in 2025

Personal information
- Full name: Daniel Ulises Leyva
- Date of birth: May 5, 2003 (age 23)
- Place of birth: Las Vegas, Nevada, United States
- Height: 1.79 m (5 ft 10 1/2 in)
- Position: Defensive midfielder

Team information
- Current team: Necaxa
- Number: 6

Youth career
- 2017–2019: Seattle Sounders

Senior career*
Years	Team	Apps	(Gls)
2018–2023	Tacoma Defiance	40	(3)
2019–2025	Seattle Sounders	86	(0)
2023	→ Colorado Rapids (loan)	16	(0)
2026–	Necaxa	33	(1)

International career^{‡}
2018	United States U16	5	(1)
2019	United States U17	10	(0)
2021	United States U20	2	(0)
2023–	United States U23	5	(1)
- * Club domestic league appearances and goals as of November 6, 2026 ‡ National team caps and goals as of November 16, 2021

Daniel Ulises Leyva (born May 5, 2003) is an American professional soccer player who plays as a defensive midfielder for Necaxa of Liga MX after starting his career with Major League Soccer club Seattle Sounders.

== Club career ==
Leyva was raised in Las Vegas, Nevada; his father Ulises had played in the youth academy of América in Mexico City, but left the sport to pursue a career in civil engineering. Leyva played for the Barcelona USA Academy in Las Vegas before joining the Seattle Sounders FC Academy at the age of 13. Leyva was placed on Seattle's under-15 team ahead of the 2017–18 season, but was later moved to the under-17 squad.

=== Seattle Sounders ===
He made his debut for the Sounders reserve team in the United Soccer League (USL) on September 29, 2018, during a 3–1 loss to San Antonio FC, becoming the second-youngest player in league history. Leyva signed a full USL contract with the team the following month and began training with the senior team during the 2019 preseason, appearing in friendlies against the Portland Timbers and Club Nacional. Leyva signed a homegrown contract with Seattle Sounders FC on April 9, 2019, becoming the youngest player in the team's history. He made his first-team debut on June 5, 2019, as a late substitute during an away loss to the Montreal Impact, becoming the third-youngest player in the league's history. Leyva played in 12 matches during the 2022 season and had two assists as a temporary replacement for injured midfielders João Paulo and Obed Vargas until they returned mid-season.

==== Loan to Colorado Rapids ====
On April 24, 2023, the Sounders loaned Leyva to the Colorado for the rest of the season in exchange for a future MLS SuperDraft pick and $92,000 in general allocation money.

=== Necaxa ===
On December 8, 2025, the Sounders announced that Leyva would be transferred immediately to Necaxa of Liga MX for an undisclosed fee.

== International career ==
In October 2019, Leyva was named to the United States squad for the 2019 FIFA U-17 World Cup in Brazil.

Leyva, who has only played for U.S. youth national teams, is also eligible to be called up by Mexico.

== Personal life ==
Born in the United States, Leyva is of Mexican descent.

== Career statistics ==
=== Club ===
As of match played on November 6, 2026

Appearances and goals by club, season and competition
Club	Season	League			National cup		Continental		Global		Other		Total	
Club	Season	Division	Apps	Goals	Apps	Goals	Apps	Goals	Apps	Goals	Apps	Goals	Apps	Goals
Tacoma Defiance	2018	USL	1	0	—		—		—		—		1	0
Tacoma Defiance	2019	USL	14	1	—		—		—		—		14	1
Tacoma Defiance	2020	USL	1	0	—		—		—		—		1	0
Tacoma Defiance	2021	USL	6	0	—		—		—		—		6	0
Tacoma Defiance	2022	MLS Next Pro	9	1	—		—		—		—		9	1
Tacoma Defiance	2023	MLS Next Pro	2	0	—		—		—		—		2	0
Tacoma Defiance	2024	MLS Next Pro	5	1	—		—		—		—		5	1
Tacoma Defiance	2025	MLS Next Pro	2	0	—		—		—		—		2	0
Tacoma Defiance	Total		40	3	—		—		—		—		40	3
Seattle Sounders	2019	MLS	6	0	1	0	—		—		—		7	0
Seattle Sounders	2020	MLS	2	0	—		1 (Note: Appearance(s) in CONCACAF Champions League)	0	—		—		3	0
Seattle Sounders	2021	MLS	24	0	—		—		—		—		24	0
Seattle Sounders	2022	MLS	19	0	1	0	2	0	—		—		22	0
Seattle Sounders	2023	MLS	3	0	—		—		1 (Note: Appearances in FIFA Club World Cup)	0	—		4	0
Seattle Sounders	2024	MLS	14	0	2	0	—		—		1 (Note: Appearances in Leagues Cup)	0	17	0
Seattle Sounders	2025	MLS	18	0	—		2	0	1	0	5	0	26	0
Seattle Sounders	Total		86	0	4	0	5	0	2	0	6	0	103	0
Colorado Rapids (loan)	2023	MLS	16	0	2	0	—		—		1	0	19	0
Necaxa	2026–27	Liga MX	17	0	—		—		—		—		17	0
Necaxa	2026–27	Liga MX	16	1	—		—		—		3	0	19	1
Necaxa	Total		33	1	—		—		—		3	0	36	1
Career total			175	4	6	0	5	0	2	0	8	0	196	4

== Honors ==
Seattle Sounders

- MLS Cup: 2019
- CONCACAF Champions League: 2022

Individual

- CONCACAF U-17 Championship Best XI: 2019
