= Josh Atencio =

American soccer player (born 2002)

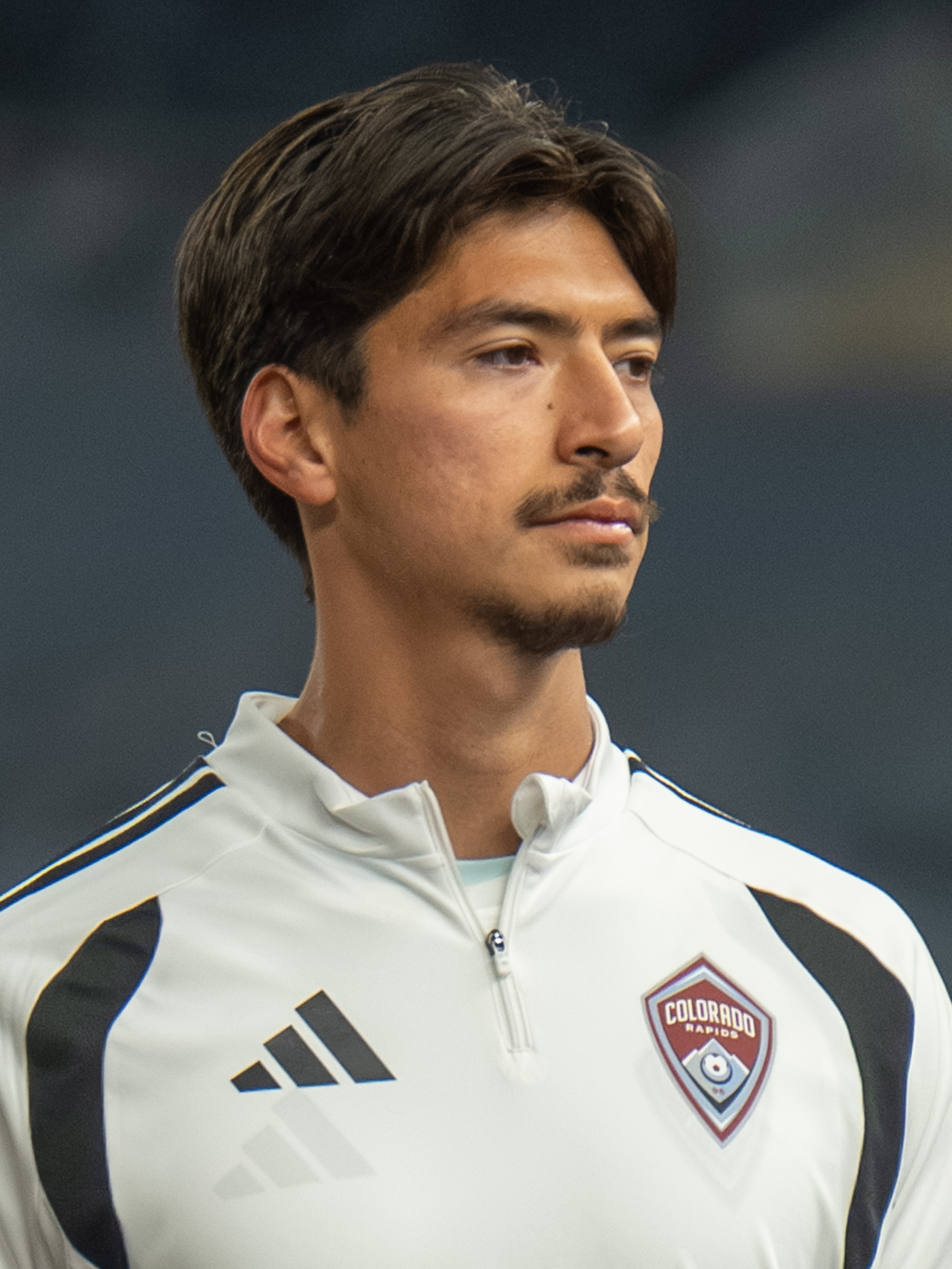
- Atencio with the Colorado Rapids in 2026

Personal information
- Full name: Joshua Ryan Atencio
- Date of birth: January 31, 2002 (age 24)
- Place of birth: Bellevue, Washington, U.S.
- Height: 6 ft 1 in (1.85 m)
- Position: Midfielder

Team information
- Current team: Colorado Rapids
- Number: 12

Youth career
- 2016–2020: Seattle Sounders FC

Senior career*
Years	Team	Apps	(Gls)
2018–2023	Tacoma Defiance	45	(3)
2020–2024	Seattle Sounders FC	91	(1)
2025–	Colorado Rapids	42	(1)

International career^{‡}
2017	United States U15	5	(0)
2017–2018	United States U17	5	(0)
2024	United States U23	2	(0)
2024–	United States	1	(0)
- * Club domestic league appearances and goals as of August 1, 2026 ‡ National team caps and goals as of August 2, 2024

Joshua Ryan Atencio (/əˈtɛnsioʊ/ ə-TEN-see-oh; born January 31, 2002) is an American professional soccer player who plays as a midfielder for Major League Soccer club Colorado Rapids and the United States national team. He spent his first five professional seasons with Seattle Sounders FC from 2020 to 2024.

== Career ==
Atencio joined the Seattle Sounders FC academy in 2016. He made his debut for USL club Seattle Sounders FC 2 in August 2018. Atencio signed a professional contract for the 2019 season.

On June 15, 2020, Atencio signed a Homegrown Players contract with the Seattle Sounders. Since then he has played as a substitute and occasional starter, appearing in the majority of games in 2021 and 2022. On April 8, 2023, Atencio scored his first MLS goal, a long-distance strike in a 3–0 home victory over St. Louis City SC. He suffered an injury to his right adductor and spent several months recovering during the 2023 season, where he saw inconsistent playing time. By the end of the regular season, Atencio had returned to the starting lineup. He signed a four-year contract extension with the Sounders in January 2024.

In a February 15, 2025 transaction one week prior to the start of a new campaign, Atencio was acquired by the Colorado Rapids from the Sounders for $1.3 million in General Allocation Money (GAM) split evenly across two seasons and an additional $300,000 in conditional GAM based on performance.

== International career ==
Born in the United States, Atencio is of Mexican descent. He is a youth international for the United States having played up to the United States U17s, and was called up to the United States U23s in November 2023.

Atencio made his debut for the senior United States national team on January 20, 2024, in a friendly against Slovenia.

He was selected as an alternate for Team USA at the 2024 Paris Olympics, and played after Gianluca Busio was injured.

== Career statistics ==
=== Club ===
As of match played December 8, 2024

Appearances and goals by club, season and competition
Club	Season	League			Playoffs		National cup		Continental		Other		Total	
Club	Season	Division	Apps	Goals	Apps	Goals	Apps	Goals	Apps	Goals	Apps	Goals	Apps	Goals
Seattle Sounders FC 2	2018	USL	2	1	—		—		—		—		2	1
Tacoma Defiance	2019	USL	25	1	—		—		—		—		25	1
Tacoma Defiance	2020	USL	2	0	—		—		—		—		2	0
Tacoma Defiance	2021	USL	2	0	—		—		—		—		2	0
Tacoma Defiance	Total		31	2	—		—		—		—		31	2
Seattle Sounders FC	2020	MLS	5	0	—		—		—		1 (Note: Appearance in the MLS is Back Tournament knockout stage)	0	6	0
Seattle Sounders FC	2021	MLS	24	0	1	0	—		—		2 (Note: Appearance(s) in Leagues Cup)	0	27	0
Seattle Sounders FC	2022	MLS	18	0	—		1	0	—		—		19	0
Seattle Sounders FC	2023	MLS	22	1	4	0	2	0	—		3 (Note: One appearance in FIFA Club World Cup, two appearances in Leagues Cup)	0	31	1
Seattle Sounders FC	2024	MLS	22	0	2	0	2	1	—		2	0	28	1
Seattle Sounders FC	Total		91	1	7	0	5	1	—		8	0	111	2
Tacoma Defiance	2022	MLS Next Pro	7	0	—		—		—		—		7	0
Tacoma Defiance	2023	MLS Next Pro	7	1	—		—		—		—		7	1
Tacoma Defiance	Total		14	1	—		—		—		—		14	1
Colorado Rapids	2025	MLS	0	0	0	0	—		0	0	—		0	0
Career total			136	4	7	0	5	1	0	0	8	0	156	5

=== International ===
As of match played January 20, 2024

Appearances and goals by national team and year
National team	Year	Apps	Goals
United States	2024	1	0
Total		1	0
