= Alex Roldán =

Salvadoran footballer (born 1996)

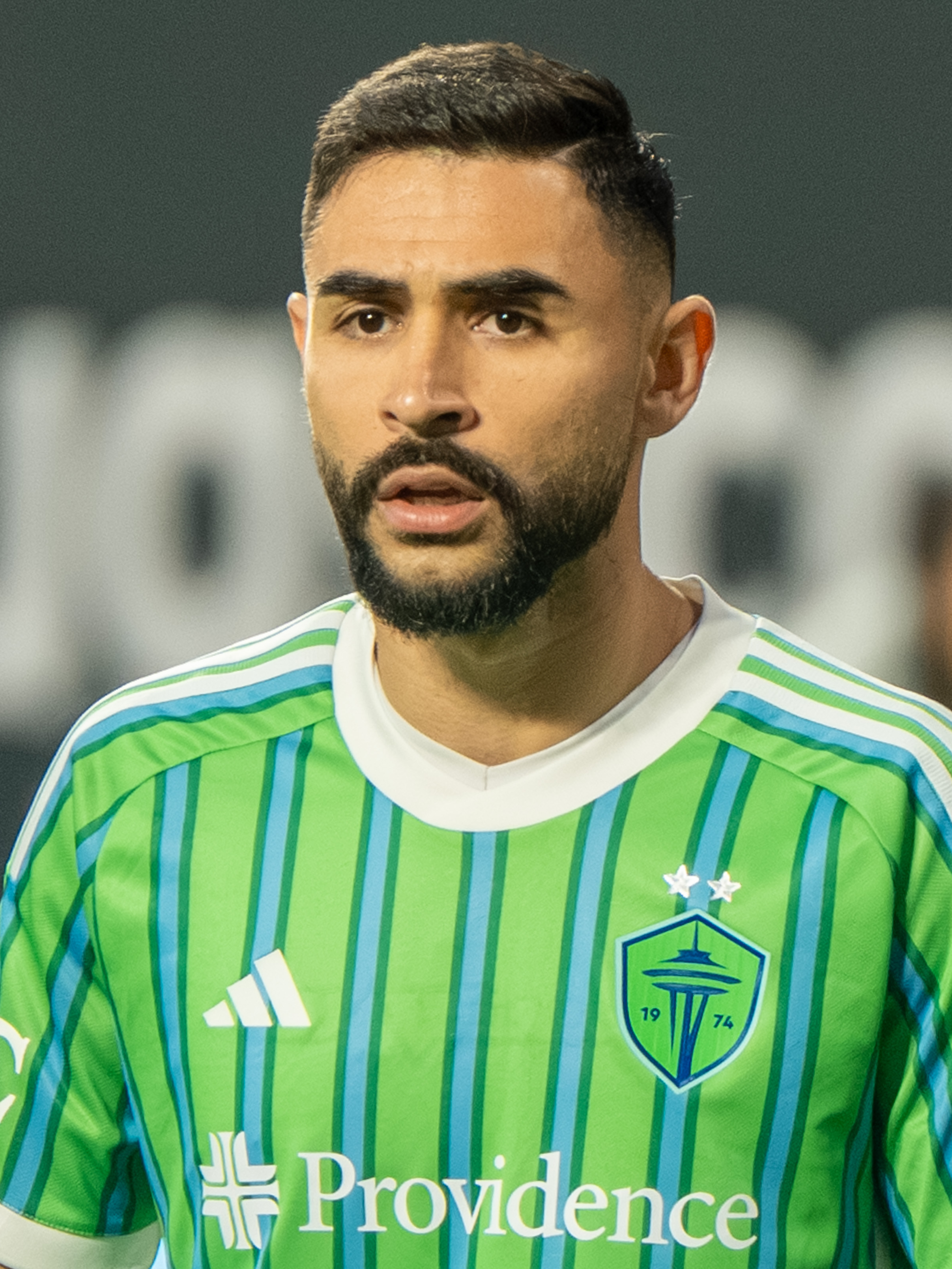
- Roldán with Seattle Sounders FC in 2025

Personal information
- Full name: Alexander Roldán León
- Date of birth: July 28, 1996 (age 30)
- Place of birth: Artesia, California, U.S.
- Height: 1.77 m (5 ft 10 in)
- Position: Right-back

Team information
- Current team: Seattle Sounders FC
- Number: 16

College career
| Years | Team | Apps | (Gls) |
| 2014–2017 | Seattle Redhawks | 82 | (18) |

Senior career*
| Years | Team | Apps | (Gls) |
| 2016 | Washington Crossfire | 13 | (0) |
| 2017 | OSA FC | | |
| 2018– | Seattle Sounders FC | 221 | (4) |
| 2018–2020 | → Tacoma Defiance (loan) | 15 | (2) |

International career^{‡}
| 2021–2023 | El Salvador | 25 | (3) |
- * Club domestic league appearances and goals as of 03:17, November 2, 2026 (UTC) ‡ National team caps and goals as of September 10, 2023

Alexander Roldán León (born July 28, 1996) is a professional footballer who plays as a right-back for Major League Soccer club Seattle Sounders FC. Born in the United States, he played for the El Salvador national team.

== Club career ==
=== College and amateur ===
Roldan attended El Rancho High School in Pico Rivera, California. He played soccer for The Dons helping them to the playoffs all four years and winning a state championship. With his time with The Dons, he earned first-team all-league three times, and was named league MVP in after his senior season.

Roldan spent his college career at the Seattle University, the cross-town rivals of the University of Washington, where his brother Cristian played. In his four seasons with the Redhawks, Roldan made a total of 82 appearances and tallied 18 goals and 17 assists.

Roldan also played in the National Premier Soccer League for OSA FC.

=== Professional ===
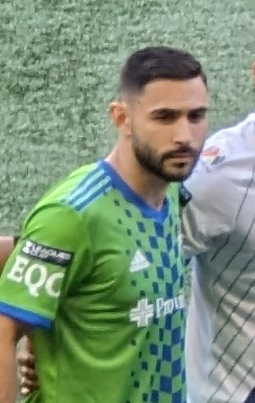
Roldán with Seattle Sounders FC in 2023.

On January 19, 2018, Roldan was selected 22nd overall in the 2018 MLS SuperDraft by Seattle Sounders FC. He signed with the club in February 2018. Alex assisted his brother Cristian in his first-ever MLS career start against Sporting Kansas City; they became the fifth set of brothers in MLS history to earn a goal/assist together. They also became the seventh pair of brothers in MLS history, including the first for the Sounders, to start together in a league match.

Roldan was primarily a reserve midfielder for two seasons; Seattle did not renew his contract at the end of the 2019 season. He was re-signed by the Sounders on February 17, 2020, following a switch to right-back. Roldan played three matches during the shortened regular season and replaced Kelvin Leerdam during the MLS Cup Playoffs as the Sounders made it to a second consecutive MLS Cup final.

Roldan had a breakout run at the beginning of the 2021 MLS season, where he became starting right-back for the Sounders. Throughout the first six matches of the regular season, Roldan recorded two assists and played every minute. During a MLS match against San Jose Earthquakes, goalkeeper Stefan Frei left the match due to injury after the Sounders had used their available substitution windows; a field player was required to step into the goalkeeper position. Roldan appeared in goal for the remaining five minutes of stoppage time, an occasion that has only occurred twelve times in MLS history, and recorded a shutout.

In 2025, Roldan played a key role in the Sounders’ cup-winning run in the Leagues Cup, scoring one goal and adding two assists in the final, against Inter Miami, and being named Man of the Match.

== International career ==
Eligible for the United States, Guatemala and El Salvador, it was reported in May 2021 that Roldan had turned down an approach from Guatemala. In June 2021 El Salvador head coach Hugo Pérez confirmed that Roldan had agreed to represent El Salvador. On June 18, he was named to El Salvador's provisional squad for the 2021 CONCACAF Gold Cup. On July 1, he was named to the final squad. On July 11 he made his international debut as a substitute in El Salvador's first group stage match against Guatemala, where he also got his first goal, scoring the first in a 2–0 victory.

== Personal life ==
Roldan was born to an immigrant father from Guatemala and mother from El Salvador, Cesar and Ana respectively, and has two older brothers, Cesar Jr., who works as a trainer for the LA Galaxy, and Cristian, a midfielder for the Seattle Sounders FC.

He married Stacy Marquez in December 2023.

== Career statistics ==
=== Club ===
As of match played November 19, 2026

Appearances and goals by club, season and competition
| Club | Season | League | | | National cup | | Continental | | Other | | Total | |
| Club | Season | Division | Apps | Goals | Apps | Goals | Apps | Goals | Apps | Goals | Apps | Goals |
|---|---|---|---|---|---|---|---|---|---|---|---|---|
| Seattle Sounders FC 2 | 2018 | USL | 8 | 1 | — | | — | | — | | 8 | 1 |
| Tacoma Defiance | 2019 | USL | 6 | 1 | — | | — | | — | | 6 | 1 |
| Tacoma Defiance | 2020 | USL | 1 | 0 | — | | — | | — | | 1 | 0 |
| Tacoma Defiance | Total | | 15 | 2 | 0 | 0 | 0 | 0 | 0 | 0 | 15 | 2 |
| Seattle Sounders FC | 2018 | MLS | 19 | 0 | 1 | 0 | 1 (Note: Appearance(s) in CONCACAF Champions League/Cup) | 0 | — | | 21 | 0 |
| Seattle Sounders FC | 2019 | MLS | 9 | 0 | 1 | 0 | — | | — | | 10 | 0 |
| Seattle Sounders FC | 2020 | MLS | 18 | 0 | — | | 1 | 0 | 4 (Note: Appearances in MLS Cup playoffs) | 0 | 23 | 0 |
| Seattle Sounders FC | 2021 | MLS | 29 | 1 | — | | — | | 4 (Note: Three appearances in Leagues Cup, one appearance in MLS Cup playoffs) | 0 | 33 | 1 |
| Seattle Sounders FC | 2022 | MLS | 32 | 1 | 0 | 0 | 8 | 0 | — | | 40 | 1 |
| Seattle Sounders FC | 2023 | MLS | 28 | 1 | 0 | 0 | — | | 7 (Note: One appearance in FIFA Club World Cup, two appearances in Leagues Cup, four appearances in MLS Cup playoffs) | 0 | 35 | 1 |
| Seattle Sounders FC | 2024 | MLS | 29 | 1 | 4 | 1 | — | | 9 (Note: Five appearances and one goal in Leagues Cup, four appearances in MLS Cup playoffs) | 1 | 42 | 3 |
| Seattle Sounders FC | 2025 | MLS | 29 | 0 | — | | 4 | 0 | 12 (Note: Three appearances in FIFA Club World Cup, six appearances and one goal in Leagues Cup, three appearances in MLS Cup playoffs) | 1 | 45 | 1 |
| Seattle Sounders FC | 2026 | MLS | 28 | 0 | — | | 4 | 0 | 4 (Note: Three appearances in Leagues Cup, one appearance in MLS Cup playoffs) | 0 | 36 | 0 |
| Seattle Sounders FC | Total | | 221 | 4 | 6 | 1 | 18 | 0 | 40 | 2 | 285 | 7 |
| Career total | | | 236 | 6 | 6 | 1 | 18 | 0 | 40 | 2 | 300 | 9 |

=== International ===
As of match played September 10, 2023

Appearances and goals by national team and year
| National team | Year | Apps | Goals |
|---|---|---|---|
| El Salvador | 2021 | 12 | 2 |
| El Salvador | 2022 | 4 | 0 |
| El Salvador | 2023 | 9 | 1 |
| Total | | 25 | 3 |

As of match played June 20, 2023. El Salvador score listed first, score column indicates score after each Roldán goal.

List of international goals scored by Alex Roldán
| No. | Date | Venue | Cap | Opponent | Score | Result | Competition |
|---|---|---|---|---|---|---|---|
| 1 | July 11, 2021 | Toyota Stadium, Frisco, United States | 1 | Guatemala | 1–0 | 2–0 | 2021 CONCACAF Gold Cup |
| 2 | November 12, 2021 | Estadio Cuscatlán, San Salvador, El Salvador | 11 | Jamaica | 1–1 | 1–1 | 2022 FIFA World Cup qualification |
| 3 | June 20, 2023 | Daejeon World Cup Stadium, Daejeon, South Korea | 20 | South Korea | 1–1 | 1–1 | Friendly |

== Honours ==
Seattle Sounders

- MLS Cup: 2019
- CONCACAF Champions League: 2022
- Leagues Cup: 2025

Individual

- MLS All-Star: 2021
