= Austin Brummett =

American soccer player (born 2004)

Personal information
- Full name: Austin Brummett
- Date of birth: February 12, 2004 (age 22)
- Place of birth: Bow, New Hampshire, United States
- Height: 1.83 m (6 ft 0 in)
- Position: Forward

Team information
- Current team: Houston Dynamo 2

Youth career
- 2015–2017: Seacoast United Phantoms
- 2017–2019: Seattle Sounders FC

College career
Years	Team	Apps	(Gls)
2022–2024	San Diego State Aztecs	52	(14)
2025	UConn Huskies	20	(10)

Senior career*
Years	Team	Apps	(Gls)
2019–2020	Tacoma Defiance	2	(0)
2021–2022	New York Red Bulls II	24	(1)
2026–	Houston Dynamo 2	25	(13)

International career
2019	United States U15	3	(1)
- * Club domestic league appearances and goals as of September 20, 2026

Austin Brummett (born February 12, 2004) is an American college soccer player who plays as a forward for Houston Dynamo 2. Prior to UConn, Brumett played collegiatelly for San Diego State as well as in the USL Championship for Tacoma Defiance and the New York Red Bulls II.

== Career ==
Born in Bow, New Hampshire, Brummett played for Seacoast United before joining the Seattle Sounders FC Academy in 2017. He was called up to the national under-15 team in 2018, alongside teammate Juan Alvarez.

Brummett was signed by the Sounders' reserve team, the Tacoma Defiance of the USL Championship, in March 2019. On April 20, 2019, he made his professional debut for the Tacoma Defiance as a 55th–minute substitute against Phoenix Rising as Tacoma lost 4–0. At the age of 15, Brummett is the youngest player to debut in the USL Championship.

In February 2021, Brummett moved to New York Red Bulls II.

Ahead of the 2022 NCAA Division I men's soccer season, Brummett signed a National Letter of Intent to play college soccer at San Diego State University.

== Career statistics ==
As of April 22, 2019

Club	Season	League			Cup		Continental		Total	
Club	Season	Division	Apps	Goals	Apps	Goals	Apps	Goals	Apps	Goals
Tacoma Defiance	2019	USL Championship	1	0	—	—	—	—	1	0
Career total			1	0	0	0	0	0	1	0
