= Joel Rydstrand =

Swedish footballer

Personal information
- Date of birth: 10 August 1995 (age 31)
- Place of birth: Uppsala, Sweden
- Height: 1.75 m (5 ft 9 in)
- Position: Midfielder

Youth career
- Almunge IK
- Sirius

College career
Years	Team	Apps	(Gls)
2015–2018	Creighton Bluejays	82	(7)

Senior career*
Years	Team	Apps	(Gls)
2013–2014	Sirius	7	(1)
2014	→ BKV Norrtälje (loan)	11	(1)
2016–2017	Lane United	11	(1)
2019	Tacoma Defiance	16	(0)
2019–2023	San Roque	99	(1)
2023–2024	Antequera	8	(0)
2024–2025	Águilas	47	(1)
- * Club domestic league appearances and goals as of 4 May 2025

Joel Rydstrand (born 10 August 1995) is a Swedish professional footballer.

== Career ==
=== Early career ===
After playing with Sirius in his native Sweden, Rystrand moved to the United States to play four years of college soccer at Creighton University between 2015 and 2018, making 82 appearances, scoring 7 goals and tallying 23 assists.

While at college, Rystrand appeared for USL PDL side Lane United.

=== Professional ===
On 11 January 2019, Rydstrand was selected 44th overall in the 2019 MLS SuperDraft by Seattle Sounders FC.

On 4 March 2019, Rydstrand signed with Seattle's USL Championship affiliate side Tacoma Defiance for their 2019 season. Rydstrand was released by the Sounders organization on August 27 after having "expressed a desire to return to his home country." Through 16 appearances, Rydstrand totaled 1,111 minutes and notched one assist.

On 27 August 2019, Rystrand made the move to Spain, joining San Roque.
