= Alfonso Ocampo-Chavez =

American soccer player

Personal information
- Full name: Alfonso Ocampo-Chavez
- Date of birth: March 25, 2002 (age 24)
- Place of birth: Merced, California, United States
- Height: 5 ft 9 in (1.75 m)
- Position: Forward

Youth career
- 2013–2016: Merced Atlas Soccer Academy
- 2016–2019: Seattle Sounders FC

Senior career*
Years	Team	Apps	(Gls)
2017–2022	Tacoma Defiance	67	(18)
2019–2022	Seattle Sounders FC	3	(0)
2021	→ FC Pinzgau Saalfelden (loan)	13	(1)
2023	Austin FC	0	(0)
2023	→ Austin FC II (loan)	22	(4)

International career^{‡}
2017	United States U15	5	(2)
2017–2019	United States U17	22	(9)
Medal record
Seattle Sounders FC
First place	MLS Cup	2019
- * Club domestic league appearances and goals as of 18:15, September 25, 2023 (UTC) ‡ National team caps and goals as of October 13, 2019

Alfonso Ocampo-Chavez (born March 25, 2002) is an American professional soccer player who plays as a forward.

== Youth career ==
Ocampo-Chavez was raised in Merced, California to Mexican parents, playing in the Merced Atlas Soccer Academy program. He signed a contract in 2016 to join the Seattle Sounders FC Academy at the age of 14, shortly after entering the U.S. youth national team system and training with the national under-14 team.

He was transferred to the Sounders' under-17 team and played in the Generation Adidas Cup, scoring four goals against other MLS academy teams.

== Professional career ==
=== Seattle Sounders FC 2 ===
Ocampo-Chavez made his professional debut on July 8, 2017, playing for USL club Seattle Sounders FC 2 on July 8, 2017, in a 4–1 defeat to Real Monarchs. He was signed to a full-time USL contract with the team in August 2018. In the 2019 Generation Adidas Cup, he led the Sounders team to the final by scoring six goals in five matches, including a hat-trick against the West Ham United Academy in the semifinal.

=== Seattle Sounders FC ===
Ocampo-Chavez signed a first-team MLS contract with the Sounders on May 1, 2019, after making three appearances for the Tacoma Defiance. Following the 2022 season, Ocampo-Chavez was released by Seattle.

==== FC Pinzgau Saalfelden (loan) ====
On July 17, 2021, he was loaned to FC Pinzgau Saalfelden.

=== Austin FC ===
On November 17, 2022, his MLS rights were claimed by Austin FC off the waivers list. On November 29, 2022, he signed a one-year deal with Austin. On November 17, 2023, Austin FC announced they would not exercise the 2024 option for Ocampo-Chavez.

==== Austin FC II (loan) ====
At the beginning of the 2023 season, Ocampo-Chavez was loaned to Austin FC II for their inaugural season in MLS Next Pro. He appeared in 22 games and scored four goals for Austin FC II, who won the 2023 MLS Next Pro Cup.

== International career ==
In October 2019, Ocampo-Chavez was named to the United States squad for the 2019 FIFA U-17 World Cup in Brazil.

Ocampo-Chavez who has only played for U.S. youth national teams, also holds the option to be called up by Mexico.

== Career statistics ==
=== Club ===
As of matches played through October 15, 2023

Appearances and goals by club, season and competition
Club	Season	League			National cup		Continental		Other		Total	
Club	Season	Division	Apps	Goals	Apps	Goals	Apps	Goals	Apps	Goals	Apps	Goals
Seattle Sounders FC 2	2017	USL	1	0	—		—		—		1	0
Seattle Sounders FC 2	2018	USL	3	0	—		—		—		3	0
Tacoma Defiance	2019	USL	17	6	—		—		—		17	6
Seattle Sounders FC	2019	MLS	3	0	0	0	—		—		3	0
Tacoma Defiance	2020	USL	13	1	—		—		—		13	1
Tacoma Defiance	2021	USL	10	2	—		—		—		10	2
Tacoma Defiance	2022	MLS Next Pro	24	9	—		—		2 (Note: Appearance(s) in MLSNP Playoffs)	0	26	9
Tacoma Defiance	Total		71	18	—		—		2	0	73	18
FC Pinzgau Saalfelden (loan)	2021–22	Austrian Regionalliga	13	1	–		–		–		13	1
FC Pinzgau Saalfelden (loan)	Total		13	1	—		—		—		13	1
Austin FC	2023	MLS	0	0	0	0	0	0	0	0	0	0
Austin FC II (loan)	2023	MLS Next Pro	22	4	—		—		3	0	25	4
Career total			106	24	0	0	0	0	5	0	112	24

== Honors ==
Austin FC II

- MLS Next Pro Cup: Champions: 2023

Seattle Sounders FC

- MLS Cup: 2019
