= Williams Velásquez =

Venezuelan footballer (born 1997)

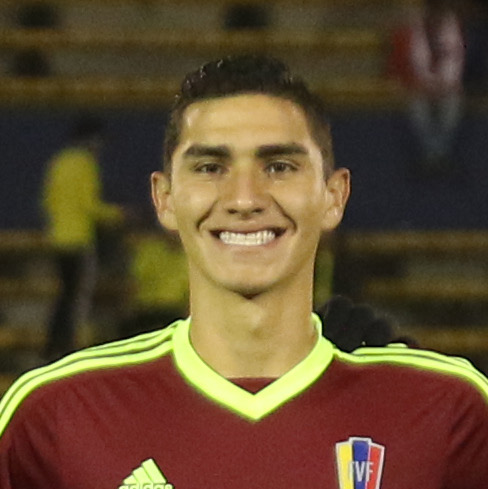

Personal information
- Full name: Williams Daniel Velásquez Reyes
- Date of birth: 22 April 1997 (age 29)
- Place of birth: Caracas, Venezuela
- Height: 1.88 m (6 ft 2 in)
- Position: Centre-back

Team information
- Current team: Universidad Central
- Number: 4

Youth career
- –2016: Estudiantes de Caracas

Senior career*
Years	Team	Apps	(Gls)
2016–2017	Estudiantes de Caracas	13	(0)
2017–2022	Watford	0	(0)
2017–2018	→ Valladolid B (loan)	21	(0)
2018	→ CE Sabadell (loan)	0	(0)
2019	→ JEF United Chiba (loan)	1	(0)
2020	→ Portland Timbers 2 (loan)	4	(0)
2022–	Universidad Central	47	(0)

International career^{‡}
2017	Venezuela U20	14	(1)
- * Club domestic league appearances and goals as of 10 March 2026 ‡ National team caps and goals as of 4 June 2017

Williams Daniel Velásquez Reyes (born 22 April 1997) is a Venezuelan footballer who plays as a defender for Universidad Central.

== International career ==
Velásquez was called up to the Venezuela under-20 side for the 2017 FIFA U-20 World Cup.

== Career statistics ==
=== Club ===
As of 25 May 2018

Club performance		League		Cup		Continental		Total	
Club	Season	Apps	Goals	Apps	Goals	Apps	Goals	Apps	Goals
Estudiantes de Caracas	2016	13	0	1	0	0	0	14	0
Estudiantes de Caracas	Total	13	0	1	0	0	0	14	0
Real Valladolid B	2017–18	21	0	0	0	0	0	21	0
Real Valladolid B	Total	21	0	0	0	0	0	21	0
Career total		34	0	1	0	0	0	35	0

== Honours ==
Venezuela U20

- FIFA U-20 World Cup: Runner-up 2017
- South American Youth Football Championship: Third Place 2017
