= Modou Ndow =

Gambian footballer

Personal information
- Date of birth: February 10, 2000 (age 26)
- Place of birth: The Gambia
- Height: 1.93 m (6 ft 4 in)
- Position: Defender

Team information
- Current team: Wallidan FC
- Number: 15

Senior career*
Years	Team	Apps	(Gls)
20??–2019	Wallidan FC		
2019	MFK Vyškov	0	(0)
2019	→ Tacoma Defiance (loan)	5	(0)
2020–	Wallidan FC		
2020	→ Al-Merrikh (loan)		
- * Club domestic league appearances and goals as of October 25, 2019

Modou Ndow (born 10 February 2000) is a Gambian footballer who plays for Wallidan FC.

== Career ==
On 22 December 2018 it was confirmed that Ndow had joined Seattle Sounders FC, renamed as Tacoma Defiance from 2019, for the whole 2019 season, on loan from MFK Vyškov.

In January 2020, he appeared to be back at Wallidan FC, as the club announced on Facebook, that he had been loaned out to Sudanese club Al-Merrikh SC. He appeared to be back at Wallidan FC in 2021.
