= Juan Alvarez (soccer) =

American soccer player

Personal information
- Full name: Juan Alvarez
- Date of birth: August 30, 2004 (age 22)
- Place of birth: Walla Walla, Washington, United States
- Height: 5 ft 6 in (1.68 m)
- Position: Midfielder

Team information
- Current team: West Virginia Mountaineers
- Number: 37

Youth career
- Pacific Northwest SC
- 2016–2021: Seattle Sounders FC

College career
Years	Team	Apps	(Gls)
2025–	West Virginia Mountaineers	0	(0)

Senior career*
Years	Team	Apps	(Gls)
2021	Seattle Sounders FC	0	(0)
2021–2023	Tacoma Defiance	44	(3)
2023	→ Pinzgau Saalfelden (loan)	4	(0)

International career
2020	United States U17	3	(0)
- * Club domestic league appearances and goals as of April 4, 2023

Juan Alvarez (born August 30, 2004) is an American professional soccer player who plays as a midfielder for West Virginia Mountaineers.

== Early life ==
Alvarez was born in Walla Walla, Washington.

== Club career ==
Alvarez began his career with Pacific Northwest Soccer Club before joining the youth setup at Major League Soccer club Seattle Sounders FC in 2016. In March 2021, it was reported that Alvarez would join the Seattle Sounders FC first team bubble for the club's pre-season. On April 10, 2021, Alvarez scored his first goal with the first team, a second half strike against San Diego Loyal at Lumen Field in a 1–0 victory.

On May 7, 2021, Alvarez signed a contract with Tacoma Defiance, an affiliate club of Seattle Sounders FC. He made his professional debut for the club in the USL Championship on May 9, 2021, against LA Galaxy II. Alvarez started the match and played the whole first half as Tacoma drew 1–1.

On July 7, 2021, Alvarez was loaned to Seattle Sounders FC on a 4-day hardship deal. He made the bench but did not appear in the Sounders' win against Houston Dynamo on July 8.

== International career ==
Alvarez has been selected into the United States squads at the under-15 and under-17 levels. He made his debut for the under-17s on February 19, 2020, in a friendly against Spain, coming on as a substitute in the 2–1 defeat.

== Career statistics ==
As of match played June 6, 2022

Appearances and goals by club, season and competition
Club	Season	League			National Cup		Continental		Total	
Club	Season	Division	Apps	Goals	Apps	Goals	Apps	Goals	Apps	Goals
Tacoma Defiance	2021	USL Championship	21	1	—		—		21	1
Tacoma Defiance	2022	MLS Next Pro	11	0	—		—		11	0
Tacoma Defiance	Career total		32	1	0	0	0	0	32	1
