= Everardo Rubio =

Mexican footballer (born 1996)

Personal information
- Full name: Jesús Everardo Rubio Quintero
- Date of birth: 24 December 1996 (age 29)
- Place of birth: Culiacán, Sinaloa, Mexico
- Height: 6 ft 0 in (1.83 m)
- Position: Centre-back

Team information
- Current team: Cartaginés

Youth career
- 2008–2014: Murcielagos

Senior career*
Years	Team	Apps	(Gls)
2014–2019	Murcielagos	88	(5)
2019	Tacoma Defiance	8	(0)
2020	Colorado Springs Switchbacks	12	(0)
2021	Chalatenango	14	(0)
2021–2023	Santos de Guápiles	32	(1)
2022–2023	→ Tijuana (loan)	3	(0)
2023–2025	Herediano	66	(8)
2025	→ Comunicaciones (loan)	19	(0)
2025–	Cartaginés	0	(0)
- * Club domestic league appearances and goals as of 15 May 2025

Jesús Everardo Rubio Quintero (born 24 December 1996) is a Mexican professional footballer who plays as a centre-back for Liga FPD club Herediano.

At club level, Rubio began his professional career with Murciélagos in 2015 in the Ascenso MX, also later playing for Murcielagos in Liga Premier before moving to Tacoma Defiance in 2019.

== Club career ==
=== Deportivo Guamuchil ===
Rubio joined the youth teams of Deportivo Guamuchil F.C. as a child before earning first team call-ups for the 2011–12 Tercera División de México season at just 16 year old.

=== Murcielagos ===
Rubio was eventually promoted with Murcielagos in 2014 playing in Liga Premier. With the team moving up to Ascenso MX in 2015, he began playing regularly at only 18 years old, mostly as defensive minded left-back.

=== Tacoma Defiance ===
After playing the 2018–19 season as captain of Murcielagos, with 28 appearances and 5 goals, Rubio was signed by Tacoma Defiance in the summer 2019 for the remaining part of the 2019 USL Championship season.

=== Colorado Springs Switchbacks FC ===
Rubio joined USL Championship side Colorado Springs Switchbacks FC in January 2020. While the start of the 2020 season was delayed by months due to the Covid pandemic, Rubio quickly established himself as a starter and finished the season as leader in anticipations and clearances per match.

=== Chalatenango ===
With the uncertainty around a delayed start in the USL 2021 season, Rubio opted to move to Chalatenango, signing initially until the end of the 2020–21 season. After just one tournament, Rubio signed on loan with Santos de Guápiles in June 2021.

=== Santos de Guápiles ===
At Santos, Rubio become immediately one of Costa Rica league toughest centrebacks due to his aerial power and man marking. Santos was semifinalist in his first tournament with the club and also qualified for Concacaf Champions League 2022.

== Career statistics ==
=== Club ===
As of 29 April 2023

Club	Season	League			Cup		Continental		Other		Total	
Club	Season	Division	Apps	Goals	Apps	Goals	Apps	Goals	Apps	Goals	Apps	Goals
Murcielagos	2015–16	Ascenso MX	15	0	7	0	–		–		6	1
Murcielagos	2017–18	Ascenso MX	5	0	–		–		—		5	0
Murcielagos	Total		20	0	7	0	–		–		27	0
Tacoma Defiance	2019	USL Championship	8	0	–		–		–		8	0
Colorado Springs Switchbacks	2020	USL Championship	12	0	–		–		–		12	0
Chalatenango	2020–21	La Primera	14	0	–		–		–		14	0
Santos de Guápiles	2021–22	Liga FPD	32	1	–		7 (Note: Appearance in CONCACAF League) (Note: Appearances in CONCACAF Champions League)	0	–		39	1
Tijuana (loan)	2022–23	Liga MX	3	0	–		–		—		3	0
Career total			89	1	7	0	7	0	0	0	103	1

== Style of play ==
Rubio began his professional career as a defensive-minded left-back.

== Personal life ==
Rubio was born and raised in the small town of Mocorito in the state of Sinaloa. He is married with one child. Rubio is also a guitar player and songwriter of Regional Mexican corrido (narrative ballad) music in his spare time.
