= Marlon Vargas =

American soccer player (born 2001)

Personal information
- Date of birth: January 12, 2001 (age 25)
- Place of birth: Bakersfield, California, United States
- Height: 5 ft 4 in (1.63 m)
- Position: Midfielder

Team information
- Current team: New Mexico United
- Number: 8

Youth career
- 2015–2016: Central California Aztecs
- 2016–2019: Seattle Sounders

Senior career*
Years	Team	Apps	(Gls)
2018–2022	Tacoma Defiance	88	(16)
2023–2024	Colorado Rapids 2	49	(15)
2023	→ Colorado Rapids (loan)	1	(0)
2024	→ New Mexico United (loan)	8	(1)
2025–	New Mexico United	26	(3)
2026	→ Union Omaha (loan)	8	(2)
- * Club domestic league appearances and goals as of September 10, 2026

Marlon Vargas (born January 12, 2001) is an American soccer player who plays as a midfielder for New Mexico United in the USL Championship.

== Club career ==
He joined the academy of Major League Soccer's Seattle Sounders FC in 2016 and signed a professional contract with the team's reserve side two years later. Vargas played regularly for the reserves, later renamed Tacoma Defiance, and led the team in scoring during the 2022 season. With his 12 goals and six assists, he was also named to the MLS Next Pro Best XI at the end of the season.

On September 11, 2024 New Mexico United announced the loan signing of Marlon Vargas for the remainder of the 2024 USL Championship season. He tallied his first goal for New Mexico on October 26 vs Memphis 901 FC.

On January 9, 2025 New Mexico United announced they had signed Vargas to a full contract for the 2025 USL Championship season.

On June 29, 2026 Union Omaha of USL League One announced they had acquired Vargas on loan from New Mexico Untied. Vargas was recalled by New Mexico United in September 2026.

== Honors ==
Individual

- MLS Next Pro Best XI: 2022
