= Danny Robles =

American soccer player (born 2002)

Personal information
- Full name: Daniel Robles
- Date of birth: January 4, 2002 (age 24)
- Place of birth: Burien, Washington, United States
- Height: 5 ft 5 in (1.65 m)
- Position: Attacking midfielder

Team information
- Current team: Tacoma Defiance
- Number: 34

Youth career
- PacNW
- 2015–2018: Seattle Sounders

Senior career*
Years	Team	Apps	(Gls)
2018–2021	Tacoma Defiance	65	(6)
2022	Northern Colorado Hailstorm	27	(2)
2023	Ballard FC	16	(7)
2023–2024	Northern Colorado Hailstorm	29	(2)
2025–	Tacoma Defiance	0	(0)

International career
2018	United States U17	5	(0)
- * Club domestic league appearances and goals as of January 30, 2025

Daniel "Danny" Robles (born January 4, 2002) is an American professional soccer player who plays for Tacoma Defiance in MLS Next Pro.

== Career ==
Robles joined the Seattle Sounders FC academy in 2015. He made his debut for USL club Seattle Sounders FC 2 on September 5, 2018, appearing as a half-time substitute in a 4–4 draw with Tulsa Roughnecks.

Robles signed a professional contract with Seattle Sounders FC 2 ahead of their 2019 season.

Robles signed with new USL League One club Northern Colorado Hailstorm on February 25, 2022, ahead of their inaugural season.

Robles spent the summer of 2023 playing with Ballard FC, who won the 2023 USL League Two championship.

Following his time with Ballard, Robles was re-signed by Northern Colorado Hailstorm on August 15, 2023.

Robles returned to the Sounders organization in January 2025, signing with Tacoma Defiance, now in MLS Next Pro.
