= Alec Díaz =

Puerto Rican footballer (born 2001)

- Díaz with Toronto FC II in 2022

Personal information
- Date of birth: December 7, 2001 (age 24)
- Place of birth: San Juan, Puerto Rico
- Height: 1.75 m (5 ft 9 in)
- Position: Forward

Team information
- Current team: Colorado Rapids 2
- Number: 47

Youth career
- 2010–2013: Eastside FC
- 2013–2015: Pacific Northwest SC
- 2015–2018: Seattle Sounders FC

Senior career*
Years	Team	Apps	(Gls)
2018–2021	Tacoma Defiance (Note: Seattle Sounders 2 changed its name to Tacoma Defiance in 2019)	65	(14)
2022–2023	Toronto FC II	31	(7)
2024	Colorado Rapids 2	26	(4)

International career^{‡}
2020	Puerto Rico U20	3	(2)
2019–	Puerto Rico	11	(2)
- * Club domestic league appearances and goals as of November 2, 2024 ‡ National team caps and goals as of June 30, 2025

Alec Díaz (born December 7, 2001) is a Puerto Rican footballer who plays as a forward who currently plays for the Puerto Rico national team.

== Early life ==
Díaz began playing soccer at age three or four. He played youth soccer with Pacific Northwest SC(PacNW). He also played at the state level for Washington.

In 2015, he joined the Seattle Sounders FC Academy via the Sounders Discovery Program. At the U16 level, he helped them win the Youdan Trophy in 2016 defeating FC Basel. In 2018, he won the USSDA National Championship with the U17 Sounders, scoring 36 goals in 38 matches across all competitions and also scored the winning goal to win the Generation Adidas Cup over the New York Red Bulls Academy.

== Club career ==
In 2018, he signed a USL Academy contract with Seattle Sounders FC 2 (later renamed to Tacoma Defiance). He made his USL debut on September 5, 2018, appearing as a 59th-minute substitute in a 4–4 draw against the Tulsa Roughnecks. He scored his first professional goal on October 10 against the Colorado Springs Switchbacks. Díaz signed a professional contract with Seattle Sounders FC 2 ahead of their 2019 season. In his first full professional season, he scored one goal in 16 appearances. In 2020, he ranked in the top 10 in the league in combined goals and assists per 90 minutes, the only teenager in the top 10. On August 3, 2020, he scored a brace in a 4-0 victory over Portland Timbers 2. He was later named to the USL Team of the Week, following the performance.

In March 2022, he joined Toronto FC II of MLS Next Pro. On September 15, 2023, he scored a brace with two goals in two minutes against New York City FC II.

In March 2024, he signed with Colorado Rapids 2 for the 2024 season. He made his debut on March 17, recording his first assist for the club in a match against St. Louis City 2. He scored his first goal on March 21 in a 2024 U.S. Open Cup match in a 3–0 victory over Azteca FC.

== International career ==
In January 2019, Díaz was called up to a training camp for the United States U18.

In September 2019, Díaz was called up to the Puerto Rico national team ahead of a friendly match against Honduras and CONCACAF Nations League match against Guatemala. He made his debut against Honduras on September 5, 2019.

In February 2020, he was called up for the Puerto Rico U-20 national team for the first round of the 2020 CONCACAF U-20 Championship qualifying tournament. He appeared in all three matches, including scoring two goals against the Cayman Islands U20.
