= Sota Kitahara =

American soccer player

Personal information
- Date of birth: January 11, 2003 (age 23)
- Place of birth: Edmonds, Washington, United States
- Height: 5 ft 9 in (1.75 m)
- Position: Midfielder

Youth career
- 2016–2022: Seattle Sounders FC

Senior career*
Years	Team	Apps	(Gls)
2019–2022	Tacoma Defiance	26	(1)
2021	→ FC Pinzgau Saalfelden (loan)	17	(0)
2023–2024	Seattle Sounders FC	3	(0)
2023–2024	→ Tacoma Defiance (loan)	16	(1)

International career
2019	United States U16		
- * Club domestic league appearances and goals as of June 6, 2024

Sota Kitahara (北原 壮太, Kitahara Sōta, born January 11, 2003) is an American soccer player who last played as a midfielder for Major League Soccer club Seattle Sounders FC.

== Club career ==
He was raised in Edmonds, Washington, and graduated from Edmonds-Woodway High School after joining the Sounders academy. He played for USL Championship side Tacoma Defiance from 2019 to 2022.

On July 17, 2021, he was loaned to FC Pinzgau Saalfelden. Kitahara signed with the senior team for the Sounders on October 28, 2022. He made his debut as a substitute in the opening match of the 2023 regular season and started in two U.S. Open Cup matches. Kitahara was also loaned back to the Defiance for their first season in MLS Next Pro. His contract option for the 2025 season was declined by the Sounders on December 4, 2024.
