= Azriel González =

American soccer player (born 2001)

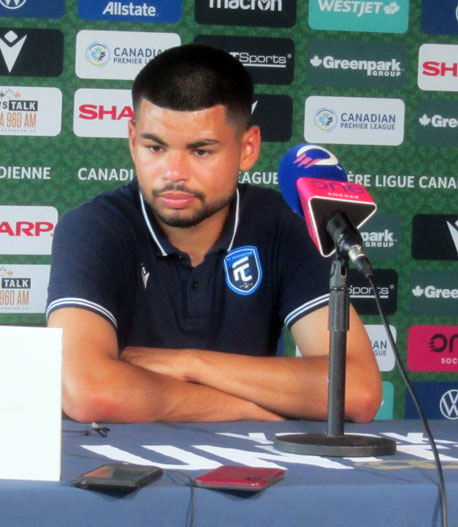
- González in 2022

Personal information
- Date of birth: May 24, 2001 (age 25)
- Place of birth: Las Vegas, Nevada, United States
- Height: 5 ft 9 in (1.75 m)
- Position: Winger

Youth career
- –2015: Heat FC
- 2015–2017: Seattle Sounders FC

Senior career*
Years	Team	Apps	(Gls)
2017–2021	Tacoma Defiance (Note: In 2017 and 2018, the Tacoma Defiance were known as Seattle Sounders 2)	69	(10)
2021	→ FC Edmonton (loan)	16	(5)
2022	York United	0	(0)
2022	→ FC Edmonton (loan)	23	(3)
2023	Las Vegas Lights	21	(3)
2024	Spokane Velocity	13	(1)
- * Club domestic league appearances and goals as of November 24, 2024

Azriel González (born May 24, 2001) is an American professional soccer player.

== Early life ==
González has been with the Seattle Sounders FC academy since 2015 when he was 13. In his first full season in the academy in 2016, González scored 12 goals and 6 assists in 18 matches for the U-16s. In that same season, the team won the Youdan Trophy, a tournament held in Sheffield, England, with González earning Golden Boot honors after scoring five goals and two assists in five matches.

== Club career ==
On April 25, 2017, González made his debut for USL club Seattle Sounders FC 2 (later renamed Tacoma Defiance) in a 3–2 defeat to San Antonio FC. He was subbed in at the 71st minute but was sent off after receiving a straight red card for a two-footed, sliding challenge in stoppage time. On June 3, 2017, he logged his first assist, the game-winning goal, in a 3–0 victory over LA Galaxy II. On July 17, 2017, he officially signed with Sounders FC 2, moving from the Seattle Sounders FC's academy to their USL team. He became the youngest player in club history to sign a professional contract. On July 20, 2017, González made his first professional start, playing the full 90 minutes, in a 2–0 defeat to Swope Park Rangers. On July 23, 2017, after making his second professional start, he was substituted off in the 43rd minute after he sustained a right lateral ankle sprain.

The 2017 season marked the first time that González had trained with Sounders' first team. González spent time with the first team during its preseason, training in Seattle and traveling with the team to Tucson, Arizona for preseason friendlies. He again joined the Sounders' first team with preseason training in Chula Vista, California before the start of the 2018 season with a number of other academy players.

On August 11, 2021, he joined FC Edmonton of the Canadian Premier League on loan.

In April 2022, González signed a one-year contract with York United, which included club options, and was immediately loaned to FC Edmonton. In December 2022, York United declined González's option for 2023.

González was announced as a new signing for USL Championship side Las Vegas Lights on January 25, 2023.

On May 24, 2024, González signed with USL League One side Spokane Velocity for the remainder of the season. Spokane opted not to renew his contract following their 2024 season.

== International career ==
González has represented the United States a number of times playing at the U-16 level.

== Style of play ==
A quick, skillful and creative player, González is capable of playing in several offensive positions. He is usually deployed as a winger or as an attacking midfielder, and has even been used as a lone striker. His club manager Ezra Hendrickson described him as "a gifted and motivated player with great instincts and technical abilities" and later described González as "an excellent finisher and very good at 1v1 defending". When describing himself, he stated, "I'm a player that tries to take players on and am confident with the ball".
