= 2023 Seattle Sounders FC season =

American soccer team season

Seattle Sounders FC
2023 season
- General manager: Craig Waibel
- Head coach: Brian Schmetzer
- Stadium: Lumen Field
- Major League Soccer: Conference: 2nd Overall: 7th
- MLS Cup playoffs: Conference semifinals
- U.S. Open Cup: Round of 32
- FIFA Club World Cup: Second round
- Leagues Cup: Group stage
- Top goalscorer: League: Jordan Morris (11); All: Jordan Morris (14)
- Highest home attendance: League: 42,054 (June 3 vs. Portland)
- Lowest home attendance: League: 30,011 (Mar. 4 vs. Salt Lake)
- Average home league attendance: 32,161
- Biggest win: League: 4–0 vs. Colorado (Feb. 26)
- Biggest defeat: League: 1–4 at Portland (Apr. 15)
Home colors	Away colors

The 2023 season was the 40th season of Seattle Sounders FC, a professional soccer team based in Seattle, Washington, United States. It was their 15th year in Major League Soccer (MLS), the top flight of American soccer, and the 40th season played by a professional team bearing the Sounders name, which originated in 1974 with the first incarnation of the franchise. The team was under the management of Brian Schmetzer in his seventh full MLS season as head coach of the Sounders.

Seattle had won the 2022 CONCACAF Champions League and qualified for the FIFA Club World Cup, which was played in early February. Following a preseason camp in Spain, the team traveled to Morocco and played Egypt's Al Ahly in the second round, where they lost 1–0. The Sounders returned to the United States and played in the MLS regular season from February to October; they finished second in the Western Conference and qualified for the MLS Cup Playoffs for the first time since the 2021 season. In the playoffs, the Sounders eliminated FC Dallas in a best-of-three series but lost to defending champions Los Angeles FC in the Western Conference Semifinals.

The team entered the 2023 U.S. Open Cup in the third round and defeated San Diego Loyal SC of the USL Championship before losing to the LA Galaxy in the round of 32. The Sounders also played in the 2023 Leagues Cup, which featured every MLS and Liga MX team, and finished third in their group behind CF Monterrey and Real Salt Lake. Jordan Morris led the team in scoring with 14 goals across all competitions. At their home stadium Lumen Field, the Sounders drew an average attendance of 32,161 during the regular season, the third-best figure in MLS.

== Background ==
Early in the 2022 season, the Sounders won the CONCACAF Champions League by defeating UNAM of Liga MX. They became the first Major League Soccer team to win the CONCACAF Champions League and third to win an international CONCACAF competition. The season ended with the team missing the MLS Cup Playoffs for the first time since joining the league, snapping a 13-year streak—among the longest in professional North American sports at the time. Four Sounders players were called up to international teams for the 2022 FIFA World Cup: forward Jordan Morris and midfielder Cristian Roldan for the United States; defender Nouhou for Cameroon; and defender Xavier Arreaga for Ecuador.

The 2023 season was the first with jersey sponsor Providence Health & Services. The choice of Providence as sponsor was criticized by fans and several organizations, including the Emerald City Supporters and the Sounders FC Alliance Council, due to the healthcare system's policies on abortion and transgender care, as well as its treatment of low-income patients. A new secondary kit to honor Bruce Lee was unveiled during preseason; it was primarily red with a dragon pattern as an homage to his final film, Enter the Dragon, and included the seal of Lee's Jeet Kune Do martial art. It was also the first under a broadcast contract with Apple TV+, which offered all league matches through its MLS Season Pass streaming platform. The club's television play-by-play commentator, Keith Costigan, joined Apple's national broadcast team while other members moved to the retained radio broadcast or other roles. A limited number of MLS matches were also broadcast on U.S. television by Fox Sports, including six that featured the Sounders.

== Summary ==
=== Preseason and FIFA Club World Cup ===
Following the end of the 2022 season, general manager Garth Lagerwey departed Seattle to become president of Atlanta United FC. He was replaced by technical director Craig Waibel on November 30. During the offseason, the Sounders exercised their contract options on most of their roster with the exception of forward Will Bruin and midfielder Alfonso Ocampo-Chavez; defender Jimmy Medranda was also released into free agency. The club had 11 players with guaranteed contracts through the 2023 season, including most of their veteran squad. In late December, the club acquired forward Héber through a trade with New York City FC. Seattle also signed two Homegrown Players, midfielder Sota Kitahara and goalkeeper Jacob Castro. The club's two SuperDraft picks, forward Eythor Bjørgolfsson and defender Blake Bowen, were signed by reserve side Tacoma Defiance after training with the first team.

The Sounders opened their training camp at Starfire Sports in Tukwila on January 4, 2023, with a full roster of healthy outfield players following the return of João Paulo and Obed Vargas from their 2022 injuries. The team played several intra-squad scrimmages during their Seattle training camp due to difficulty finding MLS and USL Championship teams with open schedules. The Sounders moved to Marbella, Spain, in late January as part of preparations for the FIFA Club World Cup hosted in Morocco the following month. There, the club was split into separate teams for scrimmages on January 28 against two European teams: a scoreless draw with Wolfsberger AC of Austria and a 3–2 loss to Swedish side Hammarby IF.

Seattle entered the Club World Cup in the second round and lost 1–0 to Egypt's Al Ahly, conceding a deflected goal in the 88th minute. They were the first MLS team to play in the Club World Cup and earned $1 million in prize money as a participant. The team were eliminated from the tournament, but a month later qualified for the expanded 2025 FIFA Club World Cup as one of four CONCACAF entrants—all recent Champions League winners. Following their return from Morocco, the Sounders played a closed-door scrimmage against Louisville City FC of the USL Championship and won 2–1 with a set of rotated lineups. Several players remained in limited training through the end of February due to injuries and fatigue, including Vargas and striker Raúl Ruidíaz.

=== February and March ===
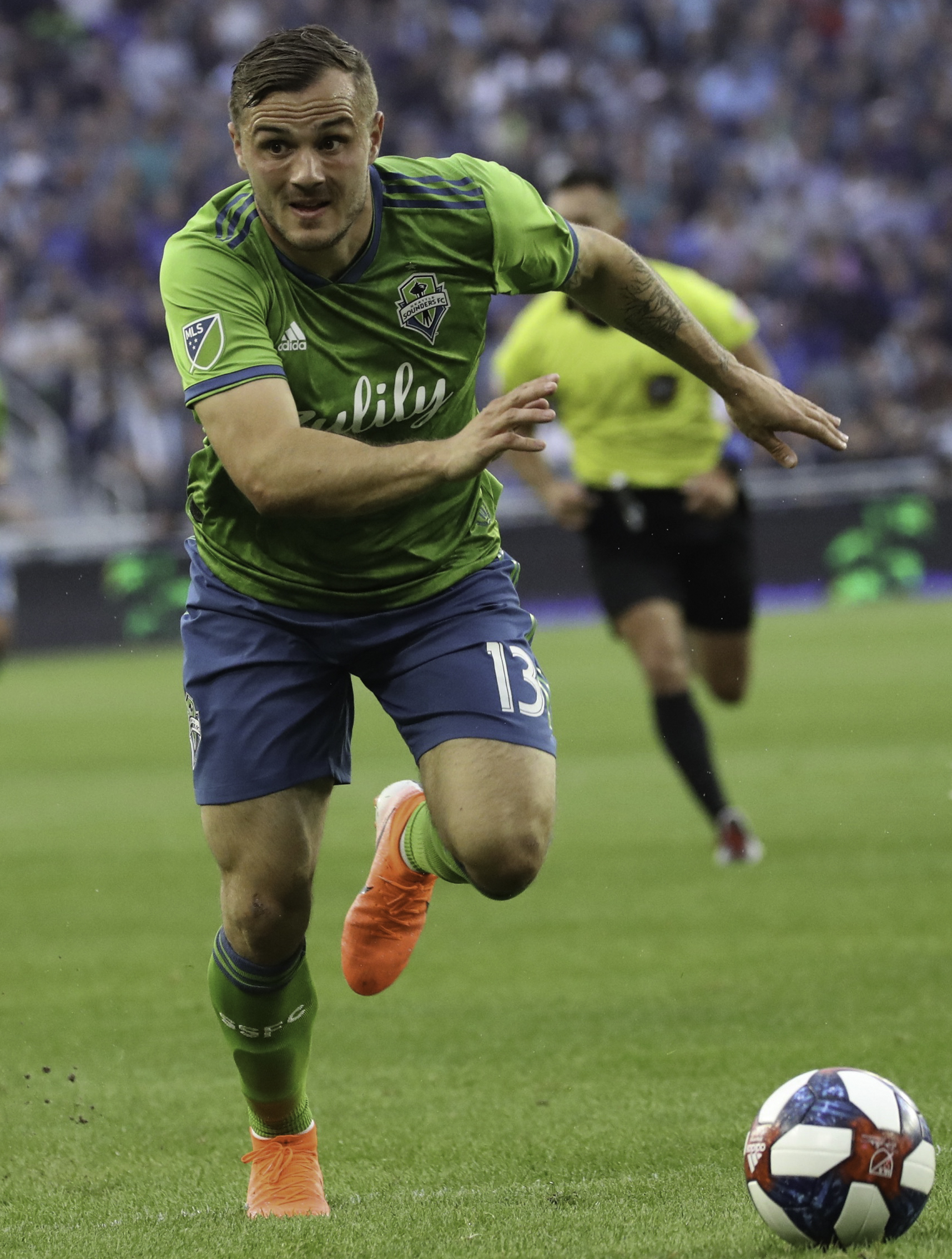
Jordan Morris (pictured in 2019) became the first Sounders player to score four goals in an MLS match

The Sounders opened their MLS regular season campaign on February 26 at home against the Colorado Rapids. The team earned a 4–0 win—Cristian Roldan scored the opening goal of the season and was followed by Jordan Morris' pair of headers. Héber also scored in his MLS debut for the club. Morris and Héber scored a goal each in the following week's 2–0 victory over Real Salt Lake at home. Héber later suffered a hamstring injury during training and was replaced in the starting lineup by Fredy Montero, who had returned to the Sounders on a renewed one-year contract. Seattle's first away match of the season ended in a 1–0 loss to FC Cincinnati despite the home side earning a red card. A late equalizing goal by Yeimar Gómez Andrade was called off by the video assistant referee due to a foul in the build-up.

The team earned their third home shutout in a scoreless draw with reigning MLS Cup 2022 champions Los Angeles FC. Ruidíaz returned to the starting lineup, but was substituted early due to injury concerns. The Sounders played against Sporting Kansas City with several positional changes due to the absence of six players who had been called up to international teams. Jordan Morris became the first Sounders player to score four goals—all assisted by Léo Chú—in the club's 4–1 victory, their first on the road since July 2022. Morris was moved from the wing to the center forward position to compensate for the loss of Ruidíaz and Héber, but their recovery left the Sounders with more offensive options. In an interview, manager Brian Schmetzer stated that "Sounders fans should be happy because we've got a really freakin' good team."

=== April ===
Morris scored his fifth consecutive goal for the club in a 2–1 win over the LA Galaxy at Dignity Health Sports Park in Carson, California. The goal was assisted by Chú, who also scored from outside the 18-yard box in the first half. The Galaxy cut the lead by a goal and made several unsuccessful attempts to score an equalizer; the team appealed for a penalty following an alleged handball by Nouhou in stoppage time, but were denied. Goalkeeper Stefan Frei finished the match with seven saves and tied Osvaldo Alonso for the most MLS starts in club history at 322 matches. Brian Schmetzer also became the third-fastest coach in MLS history to reach 100 wins, having done so in 212 matches. During a home match the following week, the Sounders earned a 3–0 victory over expansion team St. Louis City SC to replace them atop the Western Conference. Josh Atencio scored his first career MLS goal, while Raúl Ruidíaz returned as a substitute and scored his first goal since September 2022.

The Sounders traveled to Portland and faced their local rivals, the Timbers, without starting midfielders Cristian Roldan and Albert Rusnák, who were both injured. Ruidíaz scored the opening goal of the match in the 58th minute, but the Timbers scored four goals to earn their fourth consecutive win against the Sounders. After the match, Schmetzer called the result an "emotional punch to the jaw" and said that the Sounders "have to get back to understanding that this is a rivalry"; he also attributed the shift in momentum to his substitution of Léo Chú for Héber and uncharacteristic defensive mistakes. Ruidíaz suffered a hamstring strain during the match and was later ruled out for four to five weeks; Cristian Roldan, still under concussion protocols, and left-back Nouhou were also unavailable for the next match at home against Minnesota United FC. Rusnák scored his first goal of the season in the 1–0 victory over Minnesota in the 79th minute, ending a defensive deadlock that had limited scoring chances for the Sounders.

The club entered the U.S. Open Cup in the third round along with other lower-ranked MLS teams and hosted San Diego Loyal SC of the second-division USL Championship at Starfire Sports in Tukwila. The Sounders fielded a lineup of reserves with eight players making their 2023 debuts—including several players from reserve side Tacoma Defiance on temporary contracts—to rest starters for upcoming league matches. The hosts took a 2–0 lead over San Diego in the opening half-hour, but conceded a penalty in the 53rd minute that was converted by Joe Corona. The Sounders reclaimed their two-goal lead but conceded twice—a free kick from Corona and a long-distance strike by Kyle Adams in stoppage time—to finish regulation time at 3–3. In extra time, Reed Baker-Whiting scored from outside the box for Seattle, but San Diego's Jackson Kasanzu headed an equalizer shortly after entering as a substitute. Kasanzu conceded a penalty in stoppage time that was converted by Fredy Montero for his second goal of the game as the Sounders won 5–4 and advanced in the U.S. Open Cup for the first time since 2017.

=== May ===
The Sounders returned to MLS play with a scoreless draw against Real Salt Lake in Utah, where the team had only won once in fifteen previous regular season matches. Defender Kelyn Rowe started the match and left in stoppage time with a knee injury; he had replaced Nouhou after the latter contracted malaria. Defiance defender Cody Baker was signed to a short-term contract to replace Rowe ahead of the next match at home against Sporting Kansas City, which the Sounders would play without the injured Roldan and Ruidíaz, as well as João Paulo for yellow card accumulation. Sporting Kansas City earned their first win of the season after scoring twice in the opening half-hour; Montero earned a penalty for the Sounders in the second half that was converted by Lodeiro, but the team lost 2–1, their first loss and non-shutout at home in 2023. The Sounders were eliminated from the U.S. Open Cup in the round of 32, played a few days later, by losing 3–1 on the road to the LA Galaxy. The club fielded six reserve and youth players alongside Fredy Montero and Xavier Arreaga, but conceded two goals to Memo Rodríguez in the second half. Paul Rothrock scored his second goal of the tournament for the Sounders from a header in the 68th minute, shortly after Rodríguez's first goal.

A few days after their elimination from the U.S. Open Cup, the team traveled to play the Houston Dynamo with both Baker and Rothrock signing an additional short-term contract to fill in for injured first-team players. The match was disrupted in the first half by a weather delay and included two red cards shown to Dynamo players; the sole goal in the 1–0 away victory was scored by Rothrock in the 87th minute. A total of eight players who appeared during the match against the Dynamo had been developed in the Sounders academy, setting a club record. The Sounders returned home to play Austin FC, who snapped an eight-match winless streak with a 2–1 midweek win at Lumen Field; after several substitutions, Fredy Montero scored for Seattle in the 79th minute and the team unsuccessfully pushed for an equalizer. The Sounders then lost 2–0 on the road to Vancouver Whitecaps FC, conceding a goal to Pedro Vite in the first half and an own goal by Stefan Frei in the second; the result dropped the team to second in the Western Conference.

The Sounders began a three-match homestand with a 1–0 win against the New York Red Bulls, who they played for the first time in four years. Morris scored the lone goal of the match in the 22nd minute, but was substituted three minutes later due to a groin injury; Seattle maintained a shutout despite losing João Paulo, who was sent off after receiving a second yellow card in the second half. In a midweek home match, the Sounders lost 1–0 to the San Jose Earthquakes, who broke a 14-match away winless streak. Jeremy Ebobisse scored early in the second half as the hosts made 23 shots that forced eight saves out of Earthquakes goalkeeper Daniel. The team finished May still atop the Western Conference standings and only one home win in four matches at Lumen Field.

=== June and July ===
On June 3, the Sounders and women's team OL Reign held a doubleheader event at Lumen Field, their shared home venue, against their respective Portland rivals. The clubs sold 42,054 tickets to the doubleheader, which began with a scoreless draw between the Sounders and Timbers; it was the 100th MLS shutout for Frei and also marked the return of Cristian Roldan following his concussion. After the match, Schmezter stated that the team had "dropped points" but he "believe[d] in the process that we have" especially as players returned from injuries; the Sounders had only scored four goals over an eight-match stretch that included four losses. The team then traveled to play Charlotte FC with Roldan and Ruidíaz returning to the starting lineup for the first time since early April. The Sounders took the lead three times through a first-half goal by Roldan and a brace from Ruidíaz, but the match ended in a 3–3 draw.

The team took a break from play during the mid-June international window and lost Jordan Morris, Cristian Roldan, and Alex Roldán to national team call-ups ahead of the CONCACAF Gold Cup. The Sounders played mid-week on the road against Los Angeles FC and lost 1–0 after conceding a goal in the first minute and struggled to find a chance to equalize. They returned home and played Orlando City SC to a scoreless draw to continue their month-long winless streak; Ruidíaz was absent for the match to attend a family funeral. The five-match winless streak for the Sounders ended on July 1 with a 1–0 win at home against the Houston Dynamo, who again had a player sent off. Rusnák scored the lone goal of the match in the 67th minute.

The Sounders traveled to Vancouver for their next match but would play with goalkeeper Stefan Cleveland replacing Stefan Frei, who had a concussion during training. The team won 3–2 after trailing twice against the Whitecaps and not earning a penalty for a potential handball in the box. Léo Chú scored two equalizing goals in the 60th and 76th minutes from set-pieces that were assisted by defender Jackson Ragen's headers. The winning goal was created in stoppage time by Chú's cross into the box, which was deflected to reach Yeimar Gómez Andrade, who scored from inside the box. In their second away match of the week, the Sounders lost 2–0 to the San Jose Earthquakes, who won the Heritage Cup as a result. San Jose scored from a penalty kick in the 19th minute and a volley shot off a corner kick in the second half, while Seattle were limited to two shots on goal. The Sounders returned home to face FC Dallas with their full contingent of starting players after the conclusion of the Gold Cup. The teams played to a 1–1 draw that began with an own goal by Dallas defender Sam Junqua and was followed by a Bernard Kamungo header to equalize in the first half. Seattle entered the Leagues Cup break at fourth place in the Western Conference.

==== Leagues Cup ====
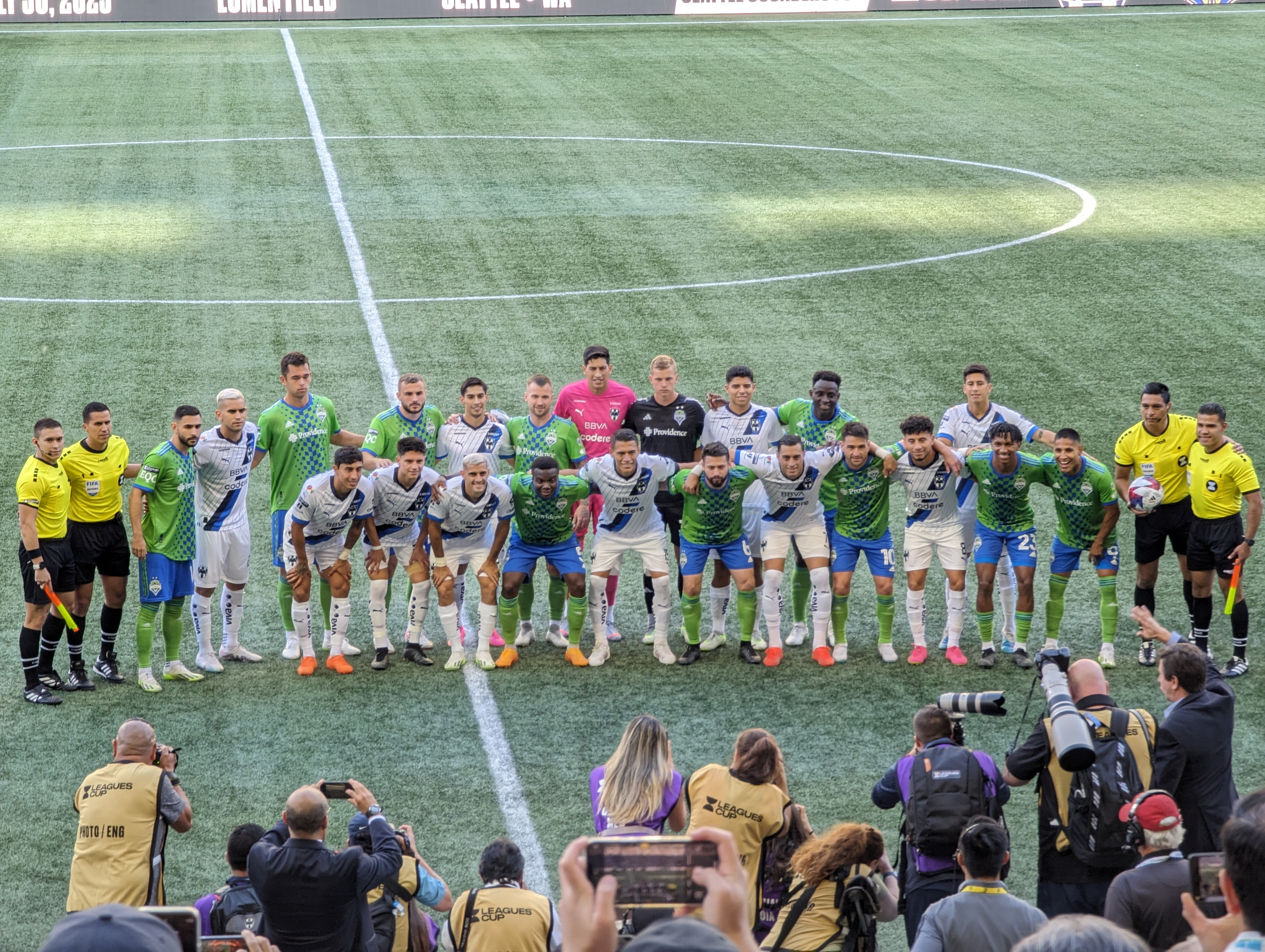
The starting lineups for the Sounders and Liga MX club C.F. Monterrey in their 2023 Leagues Cup group stage match on July 30.

In July and August, MLS play halted for the Leagues Cup, an international competition with Liga MX clubs hosted in the United States and Canada. The Sounders were drawn into group West 2 alongside Real Salt Lake and Liga MX's Monterrey. They opened the tournament on the road with a loss to Real Salt Lake after a scoreless first half. The Sounders made several half-time substitutions and called for a penalty early, but instead conceded from a counter-attack while disputing the referee's non-call. Real Salt Lake defender Marcelo Silva was shown a red card in the 60th minute for a foul, but the hosts won 3–0. The Sounders hosted Monterrey in the final matchday of the group stage and scored two goals in the first ten minutes, but then conceded four goals—including a hat-trick by Germán Berterame—to lose 4–2. The team were eliminated from the Leagues Cup and finished third in group West 2; their next match would be 20 days later in mid-August.

=== August and September ===
The Sounders returned to regular season play on August 20 by hosting Atlanta United FC at Lumen Field under hazy conditions due to nearby wildfires. The team lost 2–0 as Atlanta's Giorgos Giakoumakis scored in the 11th and 65th minutes to beat Stefan Frei, who had been named captain and set a new club record for appearances in all competitions with his 340th match. The Sounders had several chances in the second half, but were unable to convert them. In their next match, on the road against Minnesota United FC, the Sounders made several positional changes and earned a draw. Both goals in the 1–1 draw were created through headers by Yeimar—a 17th-minute goal for the Sounders and an own goal in the second half—and Frei made three saves in the last minutes of the game.

The team ended their six-match run without a win by defeating Austin FC 2–1 during an away game at the end of August. The Sounders took the lead early in the second half through Jordan Morris while Frei made several saves to prevent Austin from scoring a second goal; both Morris's goal and a Frei save minutes later were reviewed by the video assistant referee but allowed to stand. The winning goal was scored at the beginning of stoppage time by Albert Rusnák after he received a rebound from an earlier shot by Obed Vargas. The Sounders then hosted the Portland Timbers in their penultimate Cascadia Cup fixture of the season; the home side took a 2–0 lead in the first half through goals by Raúl Ruidíaz and Léo Chú, who was sent off in the 53rd minute for his second yellow card of the match. The Timbers equalized through a pair of goals three minutes apart, but were held to a 2–2 draw after several saves from Frei. The two goals were the most the Sounders had scored at Lumen Field since April but extended a six-year home winless streak against the Timbers.

The Sounders began a three-match road trip by playing FC Dallas to a 1–1 draw that saw the return of Cristian Roldan following his concussion treatments. Dallas took the lead in the first half, but Alex Roldán's volley off a cross by Reed Baker-Whiting in the 57th minute tied the score. The team traveled to play the Colorado Rapids later in the week and won 2–1 to maintain their second-place rank in the Western Conference. Chú returned from his suspension to score the opening goal in the 34th minute, which was followed by Rusnák's header in the second half from a Cristian Roldan cross; the Rapids scored in the 80th minute, but were unable to find an equalizer and lost to the Sounders at home for the first time since 2018. After a one-week bye, they finished the road trip with a scoreless draw against Nashville SC. Héber's goal for the Sounders in the 58th minute was disallowed after video review due to an offside.

=== October ===
The team clinched a playoff berth on October 4 with their 2–1 defeat of the LA Galaxy, their first home win since July. The Sounders took the lead in the ninth minute through a header from Jordan Morris, but conceded an equalizer early in the second half; Cristian Roldan scored the winning goal in stoppage time off a throw-in by Alex Roldan that was headed towards him by Josh Atencio. Seattle's final home regular season match was played three days later against Vancouver Whitecaps FC with 33,666 in attendance. It finished in a scoreless draw as Vancouver goalkeeper Yohei Takaoka made five saves. The result dropped the Sounders to third in the Western Conference.

On Decision Day, the Sounders defeated conference leaders St. Louis City SC 2–0 on the road and clinched second in the Western Conference; with a loss, the team could have finished as low as sixth. Both goals were scored in the first half, beginning with Rusnák's shot from distance in the 23rd minute, which was followed by Reed Baker-Whiting's attempt that was deflected by Tim Parker as an own goal. St. Louis were awarded a penalty kick for a foul by Cristian Roldan on Niko Gioacchini in the 66th minute, but it was rescinded after video review due to the lack of contact.

Seattle finished the regular season with a 14–9–11 record and were undefeated in their final nine matches. Stefan Frei set a team record for the most shutouts in a season at 14, surpassing his total in the 2017 season. Jordan Morris was the top goalscorer during the regular season with 11 goals in 26 matches. The Sounders had an average attendance of 32,161 spectators per home match, the third highest in the league.

=== November: MLS Cup Playoffs ===
As the second-place team in the Western Conference, the Sounders were paired with seventh-placed FC Dallas in the first round of the playoffs, which would be played as a best-of-three series. The team hosted the opening match at Lumen Field and won 2–0 with Rusnák's penalty kick before half-time and a header by Morris off Nouhou's cross in the 74th minute. Stefan Frei made four saves to keep a shutout after several turnovers gave Dallas opportunities to shoot on goal. In the second game, the Sounders lost 3–1 after a penalty kick was awarded to Dallas by the video assistant referee in the 13th minute and a second goal five minutes later. Morris scored after half-time and had another goal that was ruled offside; a foul on Ruidíaz in the 75th minute was recommended for a potential penalty kick by the video assistant referee but was not awarded. A berth in the Conference Semifinals was clinched on November 10 with a 1–0 home victory, giving the Sounders a 2–1 result in the best-of-three series. Rusnák scored the lone goal of the match in the 36th minute amid several Seattle chances that missed or were saved by Dallas goalkeeper Maarten Paes.

The playoffs paused for three weeks due to an international break and resumed with the Conference Semifinals. The Sounders hosted defending MLS Cup champions Los Angeles FC in the Western Conference Semifinals on November 26 and lost 1–0 after they conceded a goal to Denis Bouanga in the 30th minute. The Sounders had the majority of chances to score but failed to beat goalkeeper Maxime Crépeau, who made seven saves. Referee Ted Unkel was criticized by media and fans for his officiating during the match, particularly missed calls that would have been in Seattle's favor. The defeat marked the end of a 19-match unbeaten streak at home in the playoffs for the Sounders and was their first home playoff loss since 2013.

== Non-competitive matches ==
Key

Win Draw Loss Void Upcoming fixture

=== Preseason matches ===
January 28	Seattle Sounders FC	0–0	Wolfsberg	Marbella, Spain
4:30 a.m. PST	Nouhou (yellow card) 85'	Report		Stadium: Dama de Noche Football Pitches; Attendance: 0 (Behind closed doors)

January 28	Seattle Sounders FC	2–3	Hammarby	Marbella, Spain
7:30 a.m. PST	Montero 39'; Minoungou 72'	Report	Đukanović 45+1'; Erabi 57', 87'	Stadium: Dama de Noche Football Pitches; Attendance: 0 (Behind closed doors)

February 18	Seattle Sounders FC	2–1	Louisville City FC	Tukwila, Washington
10:30 a.m. PST	Héber 6'; Roldan 21'	Report	Mares 74'	Stadium: Starfire Sports; Attendance: 0 (Behind closed doors)

== Competitions ==
Key

Win Draw Loss Void Upcoming fixture

=== FIFA Club World Cup ===
The 19th edition of the FIFA Club World Cup took place from February 1 to 11 in Morocco. The Sounders entered in the second round and were drawn against the winner of the first match, to be played between the OFC champion Auckland City FC of New Zealand and the CAF Champions League runners-up Al Ahly of Egypt. The winner of the second round match would play Real Madrid CF, the winners of the UEFA Champions League.

February 4 Second round	Seattle Sounders FC (United States)	0–1	(Egypt) Al Ahly	Tangier, Morocco
9:00 a.m. PST		Report	Tau (yellow card) 59'; Afsha 88'	Stadium: Ibn Batouta Stadium; Attendance: 30,589; Referee: Anthony Taylor (England)

=== Major League Soccer ===
==== League tables ====
MLS Western Conference table (2023)
Pos	Team	Pld	W	L	T	GF	GA	GD	Pts	Qualification
1	St. Louis City SC	34	17	12	5	62	45	+17	56	Qualification for round one and the CONCACAF Champions Cup round one
2	Seattle Sounders FC	34	14	9	11	41	32	+9	53	Qualification for round one
3	Los Angeles FC	34	14	10	10	54	39	+15	52	Qualification for round one
4	Houston Dynamo FC	34	14	11	9	51	38	+13	51	Qualification for round one
5	Real Salt Lake	34	14	12	8	48	50	−2	50	Qualification for round one

Source: MLS
Rules for classification: 1) points; 2) total wins; 3) total goal differential; 4) total goals scored; 5) fewer disciplinary points; 6) away goal differential; 7) away goals scored; 8) home goals differential; 9) home goals scored; 10) coin toss (2 clubs tied) or drawing of lots (≥3 clubs tied)

Overall MLS standings table
Pos	Team	Pld	W	L	T	GF	GA	GD	Pts	Qualification
5	Philadelphia Union	34	15	9	10	57	41	+16	55	Qualification for the CONCACAF Champions Cup round one (Note: As 2023 Leagues Cup third place)
6	New England Revolution	34	15	9	10	58	46	+12	55	Qualification for the CONCACAF Champions Cup round one (Note: As second highest-ranked club in 2023 MLS Supporters' Shield not already qualified)
7	Seattle Sounders FC	34	14	9	11	41	32	+9	53	Qualification for the U.S. Open Cup round of 32 (Note: As one of the top seven teams in the overall table to not qualify for the 2024 CONCACAF Champions Cup)
8	Los Angeles FC	34	14	10	10	54	39	+15	52	Qualification for the U.S. Open Cup round of 32
9	Houston Dynamo FC (U)	34	14	11	9	51	38	+13	51	Qualification for the CONCACAF Champions Cup round one and the U.S. Open Cup round of 32 (Note: Qualified for both the Champions Cup and U.S. Open Cup as 2023 U.S. Open Cup champions)

Source: MLS
Rules for classification: 1) points; 2) total wins; 3) total goal differential; 4) total goals scored; 5) fewer disciplinary points; 6) away goal differential; 7) away goals scored; 8) home goals differential; 9) home goals scored; 10) coin toss (2 clubs tied) or drawing of lots (≥3 clubs tied)
(U) U.S. Open Cup winner

==== Results summary ====
Overall								Home						Away					
Pld	W	D	L	GF	GA	GD	Pts	W	D	L	GF	GA	GD	W	D	L	GF	GA	GD
34	14	11	9	41	32	+9	53	7	6	4	19	11	+8	7	5	5	22	21	+1

Last updated: October 21, 2023.
Source: MLS

Results by matchday
Matchday	1	2	3	4	5	6	7	8	9	10	11	12	13	14	15	16	17	18	19	20	21	22	23	24	25	26	27	28	29	30	31	32	33	34
Stadium	H	H	A	H	A	A	H	A	H	A	H	A	H	A	H	H	H	A	A	H	H	A	A	H	H	A	A	H	A	A	A	H	H	A
Result	W	W	L	D	W	W	W	L	W	D	L	W	L	L	W	L	D	D	L	D	W	W	L	D	L	D	W	D	D	W	D	W	D	W
Position	1	1	6	6	4	3	2	5	4	3	3	3	3	5	3	4	5	6	9	8	8	6	8	10	11	10	9	8	9	8	9	8	9	7

Source: MLS
A = Away; H = Home; W = Win; D = Draw; L = Loss

==== Regular season ====
The Major League Soccer schedule was released on December 20, 2022. The Sounders played 34 matches—mostly against opponents from the Western Conference—during the regular season from February 26 to October 21.

February 26 1	Seattle Sounders FC	4–0	Colorado Rapids	Seattle, Washington
5:00 p.m. PST	Roldan 25'; Morris 45', 83'; Héber 53'	Report	Cabral (yellow card) 87'	Stadium: Lumen Field; Attendance: 30,032; Referee: Alex Chilowicz

March 4 2	Seattle Sounders FC	2–0	Real Salt Lake	Seattle, Washington
7:30 p.m. PST	Morris 35'; Héber 58'; Nouhou (yellow card) 73'; Léo Chú (yellow card) 86'	Report	Ojeda (yellow card) 62'	Stadium: Lumen Field; Attendance: 30,011; Referee: Victor Rivas

March 11 3	FC Cincinnati	1–0	Seattle Sounders FC	Cincinnati, Ohio
4:30 p.m. PST	Barreal (yellow card) 24'; Acosta (yellow card) 39'; Brenner 63'; Hagglund (red card) 83'	Report	João Paulo (yellow card) 57'; Yeimar (yellow card) 90+2'	Stadium: TQL Stadium; Attendance: 25,513; Referee: Joseph Dickerson

March 18 4	Seattle Sounders FC	0–0	Los Angeles FC	Seattle, Washington
1:00 p.m. PDT	João Paulo (yellow card) 35'; Nouhou (yellow card) 43'; Rusnák (yellow card) 45'; A. Roldán (yellow card) 56'	Report	Long (yellow card) 43'; Murillo (yellow card) 43'; Acosta (yellow card) 48'; Bouanga (yellow card) 84'	Stadium: Lumen Field; Attendance: 32,515; Referee: Ismail Elfath

March 25 5	Sporting Kansas City	1–4	Seattle Sounders FC	Kansas City, Kansas
5:30 p.m. PDT	Agada 5'; Sweat (yellow card) 53' (yellow-red card) 63'	Report	Morris 23', 54', 69', 77'	Stadium: Children's Mercy Park; Attendance: 18,629; Referee: Alex Chilowicz

April 1 6	LA Galaxy	1–2	Seattle Sounders FC	Carson, California
4:30 p.m. PDT	Delgado (yellow card) 58'; Neal 63'; Cáceres (yellow card) 90+5'	Report	Morris 21'; Léo Chú 35'; Ragen (yellow card) 61'; João Paulo (yellow card) 73'; Lodeiro (yellow card) 85'	Stadium: Dignity Health Sports Park; Attendance: 22,008; Referee: Allen Chapman

April 8 7	Seattle Sounders FC	3–0	St. Louis City SC	Seattle, Washington
7:30 p.m. PDT	Atencio 65'; Ruidíaz 71'; Nerwinski 89' (o.g.)	Report	Bartlett (yellow card) 6'; Parker (yellow card) 84'	Stadium: Lumen Field; Attendance: 31,789; Referee: Rubiel Vazquez

April 15 8 (Cascadia)	Portland Timbers	4–1	Seattle Sounders FC	Portland, Oregon
7:30 p.m. PDT	Chará (yellow card) 58'; Asprilla 71'; Fogaça 76'; Niezgoda 81'; Mosquera 89'	Report	João Paulo (yellow card) 44'; A. Roldán (yellow card) 54'; Ruidíaz 58'	Stadium: Providence Park; Attendance: 25,218; Referee: Drew Fischer

April 22 9	Seattle Sounders FC	1–0	Minnesota United FC	Seattle, Washington
7:30 p.m. PDT	Rusnák 79'; Yeimar (yellow card) 81'	Report	Jeong (yellow card) 43'; Boxall (yellow card) 56'	Stadium: Lumen Field; Attendance: 30,025; Referee: Armando Villarreal

April 29 10	Real Salt Lake	0–0	Seattle Sounders FC	Sandy, Utah
6:30 p.m. PDT	João Paulo (yellow card) 8'; A. Roldán (yellow card) 72'; Rusnák (yellow card) 90+4'	Report	Savarino (yellow card) 9'; Oviedo (yellow card) 36'; Glad (yellow card) 53'; Ruiz (yellow card) 62' (yellow-red card) 90+3'; Ojeda (yellow card) 69'	Stadium: America First Field; Attendance: 20,714; Referee: Nima Saghafi

May 7 11	Seattle Sounders FC	1–2	Sporting Kansas City	Seattle, Washington
1:30 p.m. PDT	A. Roldán (yellow card) 8'; Lodeiro 66' (pen.); Rusnák (yellow card) 81'	Report	Thommy 4'; Walter (yellow card) 12'; Pulido 31'; Ndenbe (yellow card) 65'; Russell (yellow card) 90+5'	Stadium: Lumen Field; Attendance: 31,620; Referee: Victor Rivas

May 13 12	Houston Dynamo FC	0–1	Seattle Sounders FC	Houston, Texas
5:30 p.m. PDT	Bassi (red card) 21'; Herrera (yellow card) 58' (yellow-red card) 78'; Bartlow (yellow card) 90+6'	Report	Lodeiro (yellow card) 62'; Ragen (yellow card) 64'; Rothrock 87'	Stadium: Shell Energy Stadium; Attendance: 14,061; Referee: Rubiel Vazquez
Note: The match was paused in the 9th minute due to a weather delay and resumed at 6:50 p.m. PDT.

May 17 13	Seattle Sounders FC	1–2	Austin FC	Seattle, Washington
7:30 p.m. PDT	Montero 79'	Report	Finlay 36'; Zardes 57'; Pereira (yellow card) 74'; Bruin (yellow card) 90+1'	Stadium: Lumen Field; Attendance: 30,026; Referee: Rosendo Mendoza

May 20 14 (Cascadia)	Vancouver Whitecaps FC	2–0	Seattle Sounders FC	Vancouver, British Columbia
7:30 p.m. PDT	Vite (yellow card) 10', (goal) 44'; Ahmed (yellow card) 34'; Frei 58' (o.g.); Córdova (yellow card) 90+3'	Report	Léo Chú (yellow card) 41'; Rusnák (yellow card) 49'; Atencio (yellow card) 70'	Stadium: BC Place Stadium; Attendance: 19,108; Referee: Joe Dickerson

May 27 15	Seattle Sounders FC	1–0	New York Red Bulls	Seattle, Washington
7:30 p.m. PDT	Morris 22'; João Paulo (yellow card) 45+1' (yellow-red card) 75'; Baker (yellow card) 55'; Ragen (yellow card) 83'	Report	Barlow (yellow card) 9'; Yearwood (yellow card) 27'; Ndam (yellow card) 90+2'	Stadium: Lumen Field; Attendance: 31,032; Referee: Jon Freemon

May 31 16 (Heritage)	Seattle Sounders FC	0–1	San Jose Earthquakes	Seattle, Washington
7:30 p.m. PDT	A. Roldán (yellow card) 19'; Ragen (yellow card) 43'; Atencio (yellow card) 86'	Report	Ebobisse 48'; Marie (yellow card) 66'; Yueill (yellow card) 77'	Stadium: Lumen Field; Attendance: 30,013; Referee: Ramy Touchan

June 3 17 (Cascadia)	Seattle Sounders FC	0–0	Portland Timbers	Seattle, Washington
1:30 p.m. PDT	Ragen (yellow card) 90+2'	Report	Chará (yellow card) 7'; Bravo (yellow card) 70'; Paredes (yellow card) 79'	Stadium: Lumen Field; Attendance: 42,054; Referee: Allen Chapman
Note: Part of a doubleheader with OL Reign and Portland Thorns FC.

June 10 18	Charlotte FC	3–3	Seattle Sounders FC	Charlotte, North Carolina
4:30 p.m. PDT	Lindsey 17'; Westwood 53'; Jones (yellow card) 62'; Vargas (yellow card) 64'; Agyemang (yellow card) 86', (goal) 89'	Report	C. Roldan 11'; Ruidíaz 36', 70'; Nouhou (yellow card) 78'	Stadium: Bank of America Stadium; Attendance: 31,563; Referee: Lukasz Szpala

June 21 19	Los Angeles FC	1–0	Seattle Sounders FC	Los Angeles, California
7:30 p.m. PDT	Bogusz 1'; Opoku (yellow card) 35'	Report	Lodeiro (yellow card) 61'	Stadium: BMO Stadium; Attendance: 22,125; Referee: Ted Unkel

June 24 20	Seattle Sounders FC	0–0	Orlando City SC	Seattle, Washington
7:30 p.m. PDT	Ragen (yellow card) 20'; Baker (yellow card) 61'; Lodeiro (yellow card) 90+3'	Report	Torres (yellow card) 41'; Araújo (yellow card) 59'	Stadium: Lumen Field; Attendance: 30,693; Referee: Pierre-Luc Lauziere

July 1 21	Seattle Sounders FC	1–0	Houston Dynamo FC	Seattle, Washington
7:30 p.m. PDT	Cissoko (yellow card) 18'; Baker (yellow card) 54'; Rusnák 67'	Report	Micael (yellow card) 61' (yellow-red card) 62'; Caicedo (yellow card) 89'; Sviatchenko (yellow card) 90+4'	Stadium: Lumen Field; Attendance: 31,840; Referee: Rosendo Mendoza

July 8 22 (Cascadia)	Vancouver Whitecaps FC	2–3	Seattle Sounders FC	Vancouver, British Columbia
7:30 p.m. PDT	Veselinović 24'; Gauld 72'; Blackmon (yellow card) 75'; Laborda (yellow card) 82' (yellow-red card) 89'	Report	Ruidíaz (yellow card) 48'; Léo Chú 60', 76'; Lodeiro (yellow card) 79'; Yeimar 90+1'	Stadium: BC Place Stadium; Attendance: 16,399; Referee: Ramy Touchan

July 12 23 (Heritage)	San Jose Earthquakes	2–0	Seattle Sounders FC	San Jose, California
7:30 p.m. PDT	Espinoza 19' (pen.); Trauco 65'	Report	Nouhou (yellow card) 41'; Léo Chú (yellow card) 45+4'	Stadium: PayPal Park; Attendance: 13,577; Referee: Fotis Bazakos

July 15 24	Seattle Sounders FC	1–1	FC Dallas	Seattle, Washington
7:30 p.m. PDT	Junqua 32' (o.g.); Rusnák (yellow card) 87'	Report	Kamungo 42'; Geovane Jesus (yellow card) 44'; Lletget (yellow card) 47'; Ntsabeleng (yellow card) 82'; Quignon (yellow card) 86'	Stadium: Lumen Field; Attendance: 32,753; Referee: Nima Saghafi

August 20 25	Seattle Sounders FC	0–2	Atlanta United FC	Seattle, Washington
7:30 p.m. PDT	Yeimar (yellow card) 8'	Report	Giakoumakis 11', 65'; Almada (yellow card) 26'; Mosquera (yellow card) 64'	Stadium: Lumen Field; Attendance: 31,149; Referee: Allen Chapman

August 27 26	Minnesota United FC	1–1	Seattle Sounders FC	St. Paul, Minnesota
1:30 p.m. PDT	Yeimar 56' (o.g.)	Report	Yeimar 17'	Stadium: Allianz Field; Attendance: 19,812; Referee: Timothy Ford

August 30 27	Austin FC	1–2	Seattle Sounders FC	Austin, Texas
5:30 p.m. PDT	Zardes (yellow card) 46'; Valencia (yellow card) 53'; Driussi 72'	Report	Ragen (yellow card) 37'; Morris 48'; Nouhou (yellow card) 87'; Rusnák 90'	Stadium: Q2 Stadium; Attendance: 20,738; Referee: Drew Fischer

September 2 28 (Cascadia)	Seattle Sounders FC	2–2	Portland Timbers	Seattle, Washington
7:30 p.m. PDT	Ruidíaz 9'; Léo Chú 30', (yellow card) 31' (yellow-red card) 53'; João Paulo (yellow card) 76'	Report	Asprilla 67', (yellow card) 68'; Evander 70'; Blanco (yellow card) 82'; Župarić (yellow card) 90+4'	Stadium: Lumen Field; Attendance: 37,031; Referee: Jon Freemon

September 16 29	FC Dallas	1–1	Seattle Sounders FC	Frisco, Texas
5:30 p.m. PDT	Obrian 15', (yellow card) 79'; Arriola (yellow card) 41'	Report	A. Roldán 57'	Stadium: Toyota Stadium; Attendance: 19,096; Referee: Allen Chapman

September 20 30	Colorado Rapids	1–2	Seattle Sounders FC	Commerce City, Colorado
6:30 p.m. PDT	Bassett 80'	Report	Léo Chú 34'; Nouhou (yellow card) 40'; Rusnák 56'	Stadium: Dick's Sporting Goods Park; Attendance: 12,548; Referee: Filip Dujic

September 30 31	Nashville SC	0–0	Seattle Sounders FC	Nashville, Tennessee
5:30 p.m. PDT	Godoy (yellow card) 31'; Mukhtar (yellow card) 60'; Lovitz (yellow card) 90+2'	Report		Stadium: Geodis Park; Attendance: 28,291; Referee: Chris Penso

October 4 32	Seattle Sounders FC	2–1	LA Galaxy	Seattle, Washington
7:30 p.m. PDT	Morris 9'; C. Roldan 90+6'	Report	Leerdam (yellow card) 38'; Costa 54'	Stadium: Lumen Field; Attendance: 30,495; Referee: Victor Rivas

October 7 33 (Cascadia)	Seattle Sounders FC	0–0	Vancouver Whitecaps FC	Seattle, Washington
7:30 p.m. PDT	C. Roldan (yellow card) 34'; Léo Chú (yellow card) 56'; Yeimar (yellow card) 73'	Report	Laborda (yellow card) 63'; Schöpf (yellow card) 66'; Laryea (yellow card) 90+1'	Stadium: Lumen Field; Attendance: 33,666; Referee: Nima Saghafi

October 21 34 (Decision Day)	St. Louis City SC	0–2	Seattle Sounders FC	St. Louis, Missouri
6:00 p.m. PDT	Parker (yellow card) 75'	Report	Yeimar (yellow card) 18'; Rusnák 23'; C. Roldan (yellow card) 32'; Parker 38' (o.g.); Ragen (yellow card) 71'; Léo Chú (yellow card) 80'; Atencio (yellow card) 87'; Lodeiro (yellow card) 90+5'	Stadium: CityPark; Attendance: 22,423; Referee: Jair Marrufo

==== MLS Cup Playoffs ====
The 2023 edition of the MLS Cup Playoffs was contested by the top nine teams in each conference beginning on October 25 and culminating with the MLS Cup final on December 9. The top seven teams in the conference qualified for Round One, a best-of-three series, along with the winner of a wild card match between the eighth and ninth seeds. The remaining rounds were single-elimination matches.

===== Round One =====
October 30 Game 1	Seattle Sounders FC	2–0	FC Dallas	Seattle, Washington
6:00 p.m. PDT	Rusnák 43' (pen.); Ragen (yellow card) 52'; Morris 74'	Report	Ferreira (yellow card) 45+3'; Tafari (yellow card) 81'	Stadium: Lumen Field; Attendance: 30,741; Referee: Joseph Dickerson

November 4 Game 2	FC Dallas	3–1	Seattle Sounders FC	Frisco, Texas
6:00 p.m. PDT	Arriola 6', (yellow card) 30'; Ferreira 18' (pen.); Pomykal (yellow card) 60'; Illarramendi (yellow card) 71'; Obrian 89'	Report	Nouhou (yellow card) 10'; Yeimar (yellow card) 21'; Morris 48'; Atencio (yellow card) 52'	Stadium: Toyota Stadium; Attendance: 19,096; Referee: Rosendo Mendoza

November 10 Game 3	Seattle Sounders FC	1–0	FC Dallas	Seattle, Washington
7:00 p.m. PST	Rusnák 36'	Report	Obrian (yellow card) 35'; Twumasi (yellow card) 71'; Arriola (yellow card) 85'	Stadium: Lumen Field; Attendance: 33,048; Referee: Fotis Bazakos
Note: Seattle Sounders FC won the series 2–1.

===== Conference Semifinals =====
November 26	Seattle Sounders FC	0–1	Los Angeles FC	Seattle, Washington
6:30 p.m. PST	Nouhou (yellow card) 20'; Atencio (yellow card) 40'; João Paulo (yellow card) 66'	Report	Bouanga 30'; Crépeau (yellow card) 84'; Palacios (yellow card) 86'; Chiellini (yellow card) 90'	Stadium: Lumen Field; Attendance: 33,649; Referee: Ted Unkel

=== U.S. Open Cup ===
The Sounders entered the 2023 U.S. Open Cup in the third round as part of the lower tranche of MLS teams, as determined by their final position in the 2022 regular season. The third round's matchups were decided in a regionalized draw on April 6.

April 26 R3	Seattle Sounders FC	5–4 (a.e.t.)	San Diego Loyal SC	Tukwila, Washington
7:00 p.m. PDT	Montero 15', 120+4' (pen.); Dobbelaere 26'; Arreaga (yellow card) 52'; Rothrock 55'; Kitahara (yellow card) 88'; Uderitz (yellow card) 92'; Baker-Whiting 101'	Report	Corona 53' (pen.), 73', (yellow card) 54'; Adams 90+3'; Kasanzu 115'	Stadium: Starfire Sports Stadium; Attendance: 3,728; Referee: Cristian Campo Hernández

May 10 Ro32	LA Galaxy	3–1	Seattle Sounders FC	Carson, California
7:30 p.m. PDT	Aude 4'; Hernández (yellow card) 41'; Rodríguez 66', 84'; Edwards (yellow card) 80'; Brugman (yellow card) 87'	Report	Baker (yellow card) 54'; Rothrock 68'; João Paulo (yellow card) 86'	Stadium: Dignity Health Sports Park; Attendance: 8,412; Referee: Matt Geringer

=== Leagues Cup ===
The 2023 Leagues Cup, an expanded version of the inter-league competition between MLS and Liga MX hosted in the United States and Canada, began on July 21. All MLS matches were paused until the end of the tournament on August 19. The Sounders were drawn into group West 2 alongside Real Salt Lake and Liga MX's Monterrey; the schedule for the tournament was announced on March 9, 2023. MLS teams played a minimum of two matches in the tournament, of which they hosted at least one.

July 22 GS	Real Salt Lake (United States)	3–0	(United States) Seattle Sounders FC	Sandy, Utah
6:30 p.m. PDT	Oviedo (yellow card) 33'; Arango (yellow card) 45+2', (goal) 51'; Savarino 48'; Silva (red card) 60'; Vera (yellow card) 81'; Rubín 88'	Report	Yeimar (yellow card) 45+2'	Stadium: America First Field; Attendance: 10,507; Referee: Guillermo Pacheco Larios

July 30 GS	Seattle Sounders FC (United States)	2–4	(Mexico) Monterrey	Seattle, Washington
6:00 p.m. PDT	Lodeiro 2'; Morris 6'; Lodeiro (yellow card) 37'; Ragen (yellow card) 72'; Yeimar (red card) 86'	Report	Moreno (yellow card) 1'; Berterame 31', 45+2' (pen.), 63'; Cortizo 48'	Stadium: Lumen Field; Attendance: 33,508; Referee: Bryan López

==== Group stage standings ====
Pos	Team	Pld	W	PW	PL	L	GF	GA	GD	Pts	Qualification	MON	RSL	SEA
1	(Mexico) Monterrey	2	2	0	0	0	7	2	+5	6	Advance to knockout stage	—	3–0	4–2
2	(United States) Real Salt Lake	2	1	0	0	1	3	3	0	3	Advance to knockout stage	—	—	3–0
3	(United States) Seattle Sounders FC	2	0	0	0	2	2	7	−5	0		—	—	—

Source: Leagues Cup
Rules for classification: Tiebreakers

== Players ==
For the 2023 season, the Sounders were permitted a maximum of 30 signed players on the first team, of which 10 roster positions were designated for supplemental and reserve players. A base salary cap of $5.21 million applied to the non-supplemental players with exceptions for certain categories, including the club's three designated players—Nicolás Lodeiro, Raúl Ruidíaz, and Albert Rusnák—who each counted for a reduced amount. Seattle's player wages at the end of the season totaled approximately $19.2 million, ranking seventh among MLS teams. The Sounders were allocated eight international slots that could be filled by players from outside the United States who did not have a green card. By the end of preseason, the team had three remaining open slots and two occupied slots; the other three were sold to other teams.

=== Roster ===
As of August 15, 2023

Note: Flags indicate national team as defined under FIFA eligibility rules. Players may hold more than one non-FIFA nationality. Squad includes all players who had first team contracts or appearances during the 2023 season across all competitions. Ages listed for each player is calculated from February 26, 2023, the first matchday of the MLS regular season.

Seattle Sounders FC first team roster
No.	Name	Nationality	Position	Age	Signed	Previous club	Notes
3	Xavier Arreaga	Ecuador	DF	28	2019	Barcelona S.C. (ECU)	
5	Nouhou Tolo	Cameroon	DF	25	2017	Seattle Sounders FC 2 (USA)	
6	João Paulo	Brazil	MF	31	2020	Botafogo (BRA)	
7	Cristian Roldan	United States	MF	27	2015	Washington Huskies (USA)	
9	Raúl Ruidíaz	Peru	FW	32	2018	Morelia (MEX)	DP
10	Nicolás Lodeiro (c)	Uruguay	MF	33	2016	Boca Juniors (ARG)	DP
11	Albert Rusnák	Slovakia	MF	28	2022	Real Salt Lake (USA)	DP
12	Fredy Montero	Colombia	FW	35	2021	Vancouver Whitecaps FC (CAN)	
13	Jordan Morris	United States	FW	28	2016	Stanford Cardinal (USA)	HGP
16	Alex Roldán	El Salvador	DF	26	2018	Seattle Redhawks (USA)	
19	Héber	Brazil	FW	31	2023	New York City FC (USA)	
21	Reed Baker-Whiting	United States	MF	17	2021	Tacoma Defiance (USA)	HGP
22	Kelyn Rowe	United States	MF	31	2021	New England Revolution (USA)	
23	Léo Chú	Brazil	MF	22	2021	Grêmio (BRA)	International
24	Stefan Frei	Switzerland	GK	36	2014	Toronto FC (CAN)	
25	Jackson Ragen	United States	DF	24	2022	Tacoma Defiance (USA)	
26	Andrew Thomas	Russia	GK	24	2021	Stanford Cardinal (USA)	
28	Yeimar Gómez Andrade	Colombia	DF	30	2020	Unión de Santa Fe (ARG)	International
29	Jacob Castro	United States	GK	23	2023	San Diego State Aztecs (USA)	HGP
30	Stefan Cleveland	United States	GK	28	2020	Chicago Fire (USA)	
32	Hal Uderitz	United States	DF	23	2023	Tacoma Defiance (USA)	Short-term loan
33	Cody Baker	United States	DF	19	2023	Tacoma Defiance (USA)	HGP
35	Paul Rothrock	United States	MF	24	2023	Tacoma Defiance (USA)	
38	Eythor Bjørgolfsson	Norway	FW	22	2023	Tacoma Defiance (USA)	Short-term loan
39	Stuart Hawkins	United States	DF	16	2023	Tacoma Defiance (USA)	HGP
45	Ethan Dobbelaere	United States	MF	20	2020	Tacoma Defiance (USA)	HGP
73	Obed Vargas	United States	MF	17	2021	Tacoma Defiance (USA)	HGP
77	Sota Kitahara	United States	MF	20	2023	Tacoma Defiance (USA)	HGP
84	Josh Atencio	United States	MF	21	2020	Tacoma Defiance (USA)	HGP
92	Abdoulaye Cissoko	France	DF	23	2021	Tacoma Defiance (USA)	
99	Dylan Teves	United States	FW	22	2022	Washington Huskies (USA)	HGP

==== Other players ====
As of May 10, 2023

Players called up to the first team from Tacoma Defiance for matches outside the regular season and playoffs, such as the U.S. Open Cup and Leagues Cup, are listed here.

Temporary Seattle Sounders FC players
No.	Name	Nationality	Position	Age	Previous club	Notes
31	Travian Sousa	United States	DF	21	Tacoma Defiance (USA)	Called up for U.S. Open Cup
93	Georgi Minoungou	Ivory Coast	MF	20	Tacoma Defiance (USA)	Called up for U.S. Open Cup

==== On loan ====
Seattle Sounders FC players on loan
No.	Name	Nationality	Position	Age	Signed	On loan to	Notes
26	Andrew Thomas	Russia	GK	24	2021	New Mexico United (USA)	Loaned until the end of the USLC season
75	Danny Leyva	United States	MF	19	2019	Colorado Rapids (USA)	HGP; loaned until the end of the season

=== Appearances and goals ===
A total of 27 players made at least one appearance for the Sounders during the 2023 season across all competitions. Midfielder Nicolás Lodeiro and defender Yeimar Gómez Andrade appeared in the most matches (40); Stefan Frei made the most appearances as goalkeeper, at 38 matches. Jordan Morris was the team's leading goalscorer in 2023 with 14 goals, while captain Nicolás Lodeiro had the most assists at 11 in the regular season and playoffs.

Player statistics (all competitions)
No.	Player	Nat.	Pos.	Regular season		Playoffs		Leagues Cup		U.S. Open Cup		Club World Cup		Total		Discipline	
No.	Player	Nat.	Pos.	Apps	Goals	Apps	Goals	Apps	Goals	Apps	Goals	Apps	Goals	Apps	Goals	A yellow rectangle, denoting the yellow penalty card shown to a player being cautioned	A red rectangle, denoting the red penalty card shown to a player being sent off
3	Xavier Arreaga	(Ecuador) ECU	DF	14	0	0	0	0	0	2	0	0	0	16	0	0	0
5	Nouhou Tolo	(Cameroon) CMR	DF	28	0	4	0	2	0	0	0	1	0	35	0	8	0
6	João Paulo	(Brazil) BRA	MF	31	0	4	0	2	0	1	0	1	0	39	0	8	1
7	Cristian Roldan	(United States) USA	MF	16	3	4	0	1	0	0	0	1	0	22	3	2	0
9	Raúl Ruidíaz	(Peru) PER	FW	18	5	3	0	2	0	0	0	1	0	24	5	1	0
10	Nicolás Lodeiro	(Uruguay) URU	MF	33	1	4	0	1	1	1	0	1	0	40	2	6	0
11	Albert Rusnák	(Slovakia) SVK	MF	32	5	4	2	2	0	0	0	1	0	39	7	5	0
12	Fredy Montero	(Colombia) COL	FW	17	1	0	0	0	0	2	2	1	0	20	3	0	0
13	Jordan Morris	(United States) USA	FW	26	11	4	2	2	1	0	0	1	0	33	14	0	0
16	Alex Roldán	(El Salvador) ESA	DF	28	1	4	0	2	0	0	0	1	0	35	1	5	0
19	Héber	(Brazil) BRA	FW	22	2	0	0	2	0	0	0	1	0	25	2	0	0
21	Reed Baker-Whiting	(United States) USA	MF	19	0	1	0	1	0	2	1	0	0	23	1	0	0
22	Kelyn Rowe	(Ecuador) ECU	MF	9	0	1	0	0	0	1	0	0	0	11	0	0	0
23	Léo Chú	(Brazil) BRA	MF	32	5	4	0	2	0	1	0	0	0	39	5	6	1
24	Stefan Frei	(Switzerland) SUI	GK	32	0	4	0	1	0	0	0	1	0	38	0	0	0
25	Jackson Ragen	(United States) USA	DF	32	0	4	0	2	0	0	0	1	0	39	0	9	0
26	Andrew Thomas	(Russia) RUS	GK	0	0	0	0	0	0	0	0	0	0	0	0	0	0
28	Yeimar Gómez Andrade	(Colombia) COL	DF	33	2	4	0	2	0	0	0	1	0	40	2	7	1
29	Jacob Castro	(United States) USA	GK	0	0	0	0	0	0	0	0	0	0	0	0	0	0
30	Stefan Cleveland	(United States) USA	GK	2	0	0	0	1	0	2	0	0	0	5	0	0	0
31	Travian Sousa	(United States) USA	DF	8	0	0	0	0	0	2	0	0	0	10	0	0	0
32	Hal Uderitz	(United States) USA	DF	8	0	0	0	0	0	1	0	0	0	9	0	0	0
33	Cody Baker	(United States) USA	DF	12	0	0	0	1	0	2	0	0	0	15	0	3	0
35	Paul Rothrock	(United States) USA	MF	4	1	0	0	0	0	2	2	0	0	6	3	0	0
38	Eythor Bjørgolfsson	(Norway) NOR	FW	0	0	0	0	0	0	1	0	0	0	1	0	0	0
39	Stuart Hawkins	(United States) USA	DF	0	0	0	0	0	0	0	0	0	0	0	0	0	0
45	Ethan Dobbelaere	(United States) USA	MF	3	0	0	0	0	0	2	1	0	0	5	1	0	0
73	Obed Vargas	(United States) USA	MF	22	0	2	0	2	0	1	0	0	0	27	0	0	0
77	Sota Kitahara	(United States) USA	MF	1	0	0	0	0	0	2	0	0	0	3	0	0	0
84	Josh Atencio	(United States) USA	MF	22	1	4	0	2	0	2	0	1	0	31	1	5	0
92	Abdoulaye Cissoko	(France) FRA	DF	2	0	0	0	1	0	2	0	0	0	5	0	1	0
93	Georgi Minoungou	(Ivory Coast) CIV	MF	0	0	0	0	0	0	1	0	0	0	1	0	0	0
99	Dylan Teves	(United States) USA	FW	13	0	0	0	1	0	2	0	0	0	16	0	0	0

== Coaching staff ==
As of October 29, 2022

Technical staff
Head coach	Brian Schmetzer (USA)
Assistant coach	Preki (USA)
Director of goalkeeping	Tom Dutra (USA)
Assistant coach	Freddy Juarez (USA)
Assistant coach	Andy Rose (ENG)

== Transfers ==
The MLS season has two transfer windows during which teams could register new players from outside of the league and those who required an International Transfer Certificate. The primary window was scheduled from January 31 to April 24; it was followed by a secondary window from July 5 to August 2 and a roster freeze date of September 15. Between the transfer windows, teams are allowed to sign free agents or other U.S.-based players, including those traded between MLS teams for other players, general allocation money, or various league slots.

For transfers in, dates listed are when Seattle Sounders FC officially signed the players to the roster. Transactions where only the rights to the players are acquired are not listed. For transfers out, dates listed are when Seattle Sounders FC officially removed the players from its roster, not when they signed with another club. If a player later signed with another club, his new club will be noted, but the date listed here remains the one when he was officially removed from the Seattle Sounders FC roster.

=== In ===
No.	Pos.	Player	Previous team	Notes	Date
77	FW	Sota Kitahara (USA)	Tacoma Defiance (USA)	Homegrown signing	October 28, 2022
29	GK	Jacob Castro (USA)	San Diego State Aztecs (USA)	Homegrown signing through 2023	December 13, 2022
19	FW	Héber (BRA)	New York City FC (USA)	Trade for $400,000 in general allocation money (GAM) and $150,000 in potential GAM based on performance	December 29, 2022
33	DF	Cody Baker (USA)	Tacoma Defiance (USA)	Short-term loan Signed full contract on May 16	May 2023; May 16, 2023 (full contract)
35	MF	Paul Rothrock (USA)	Tacoma Defiance (USA)	Short-term loan Signed full contract on August 15	May 13, 2023; August 15, 2023 (full contract)
32	DF	Hal Uderitz (USA)	Tacoma Defiance (USA)	Short-term loan	July 1, 2023
39	DF	Stuart Hawkins (USA)	Tacoma Defiance (USA)	Homegrown signing through 2026 with options for 2027 and 2028	September 13, 2023

==== Draft picks ====
Draft picks were not automatically signed to the team roster. Only those who are signed to a contract were listed as transfers in. Only trades involving draft picks and executed after the start of the 2023 MLS SuperDraft are listed in the notes.

2023 MLS SuperDraft picks for Seattle Sounders FC
Player	Round	Pick	Pos.	Previous team	Notes
Eythor Bjørgolfsson (NOR)	2nd	38	FW	Kentucky Wildcats (USA)	Signed with Tacoma Defiance.
Blake Bowen (USA)	3rd	59	DF	San Diego State Aztecs (USA)	Signed with Tacoma Defiance.

=== Out ===
No.	Pos.	Player	New team	Notes	Date
17	FW	Will Bruin (USA)	Austin FC (USA)	Option declined	October 25, 2022
87	FW	Alfonso Ocampo-Chavez (USA)	Austin FC (USA)	Option declined	October 25, 2022
94	DF	Jimmy Medranda (COL)	Columbus Crew (USA)	Out of contract	October 25, 2022
14	FW	Samuel Adeniran (USA)	St. Louis City SC (USA)	Trade for $100,000 in general allocation money	December 15, 2022
75	MF	Danny Leyva (USA)	Colorado Rapids (USA)	On loan until end of season; traded for 2025 MLS SuperDraft pick and $92,000 in general allocation money	April 24, 2023
26	GK	Andrew Thomas (RUS)	New Mexico United (USA)	On loan until end of the USLC season	September 1, 2023

== Player awards ==
Two Sounders players were finalists for MLS's year-end individual awards: Yeimar Gómez Andrade for Defender of the Year and João Paulo for Comeback Player of the Year for his recovery from a 2022 anterior cruciate ligament injury. Stefan Frei, who had the most shutouts in the 2023 regular season, was not nominated for Goalkeeper of the Year. No Sounders players won league awards or were named to the MLS Best XI. Frei was named the Sounders' most valuable player and humanitarian of the year in the team's annual awards, which were announced in December 2023.

=== MLS Player of the Matchday ===
Week	Player	Opponent
5	(United States) Jordan Morris	Sporting Kansas City
24	(Brazil) Léo Chú	Vancouver Whitecaps FC

=== MLS Goal of the Matchday ===
Week	Player	Opponent	Score (Result)
7	Josh Atencio (USA)	St. Louis City SC	1–0 (3–0)

=== MLS Team of the Matchday ===
Week	Player(s)	Opponent(s)
1	XI: Jordan Morris; Bench: Nouhou, Cristian Roldan	Colorado Rapids
2	XI: Alex Roldán; Bench: Jordan Morris	Real Salt Lake
5	XI: Jordan Morris, Léo Chú	Sporting Kansas City
6	XI: Léo Chú; Bench: Stefan Frei, Jordan Morris	LA Galaxy
7	XI: Josh Atencio	St. Louis City SC
9	XI: João Paulo	Minnesota United FC
12	XI: Alex Roldán	Houston Dynamo
17	XI: Nouhou	Portland Timbers
18	XI: Raúl Ruidíaz	Charlotte FC
24	XI: Léo Chú, Jackson Ragen; Coach: Brian Schmetzer	Vancouver Whitecaps FC
29	XI: Stefan Frei; Bench: Nicolás Lodeiro	Austin FC
32	XI: Reed Baker-Whiting	FC Dallas
35	Bench: Reed Baker-Whiting	Nashville SC
36	XI: Cristian Roldan; Bench: João Paulo	LA Galaxy
38	XI: Jackson Ragen	St. Louis City SC

== Aftermath ==
The Sounders finished the season with the best defense in MLS but one of the worst scoring records, blamed on an inability to finish goalscoring chances. The team is expected to make several major offseason transactions to replace players who have left or had their contracts expire. Among the departures was captain Nicolás Lodeiro, who became a free agent and signed with Orlando City SC during the offseason. The 2024 season marks the club's 50th anniversary and includes the use of a new crest and the opening of the Sounders FC Center at Longacres, a new training facility in Renton, Washington.
