= Léo Chú =

Brazilian footballer (born 2000)

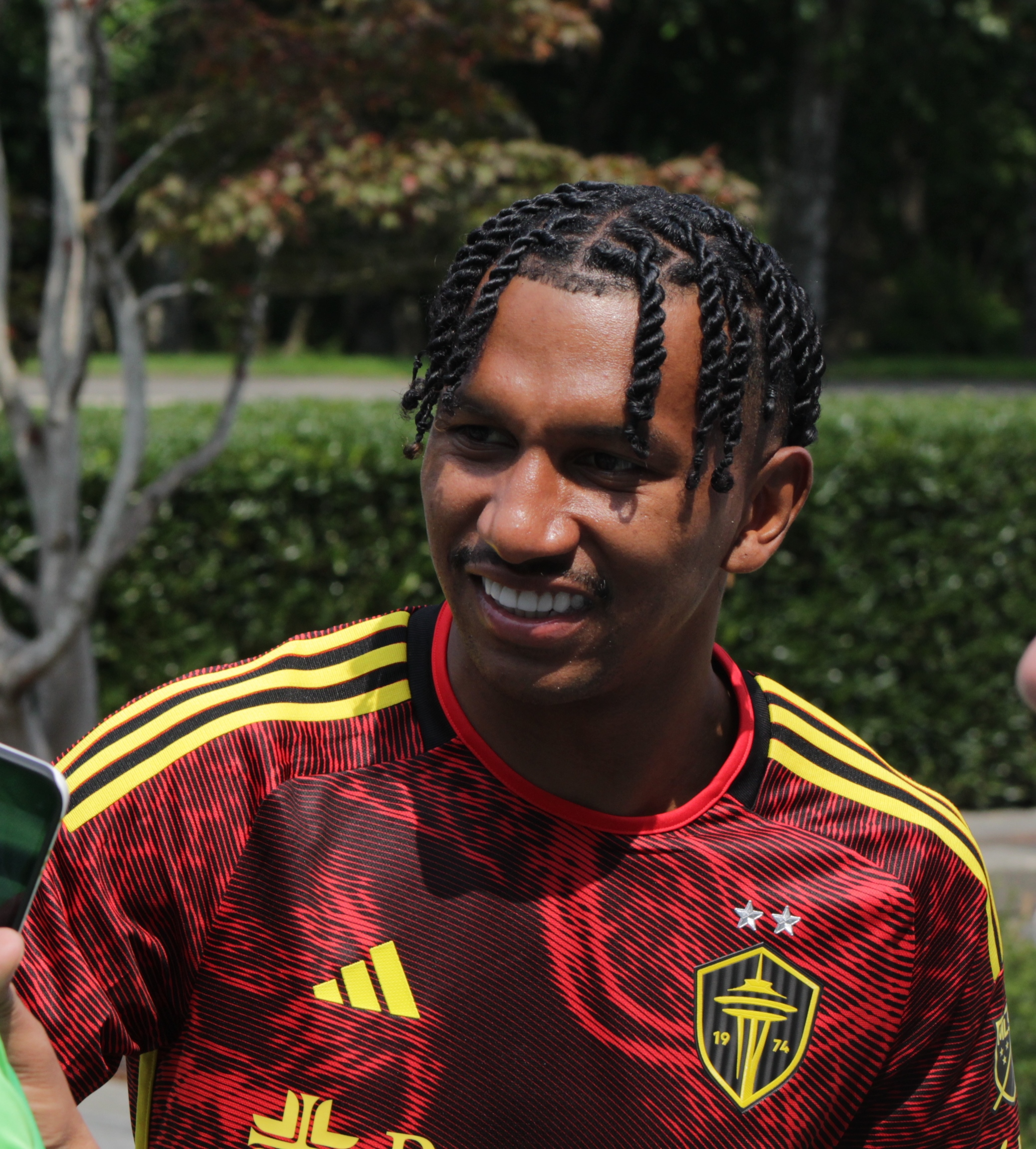
- Chú with Seattle in 2024

Personal information
- Full name: Leonardo Alves Chú Franco
- Date of birth: 6 April 2000 (age 26)
- Place of birth: Porto Alegre, Brazil
- Height: 1.78 m (5 ft 10 in)
- Position: Winger

Team information
- Current team: Avaí (on loan from Alverca)
- Number: 7

Youth career
- 2010–2019: Grêmio

Senior career*
Years	Team	Apps	(Gls)
2020–2021	Grêmio	4	(0)
2020–2021	→ Ceará (loan)	22	(3)
2021–2024	Seattle Sounders FC	79	(7)
2025	FC Dallas	4	(1)
2025–	Alverca	0	(0)
2026	→ Athletic (loan)	2	(0)
2026–	→ Avaí (loan)	8	(0)
- * Club domestic league appearances and goals as of 18 November 2026

Leonardo Alves Chú Franco (born 6 April 2000), known as Léo Chú, is a Brazilian professional footballer who plays as a winger for Avaí on loan from Alverca.

== Club career ==
=== Grêmio ===
Léo Chú was born in Porto Alegre, Rio Grande do Sul, and joined Grêmio's youth setup at the age of ten. On 5 February 2020, he renewed his contract until the end of 2024.

==== Ceará (loan) ====
On 10 February 2020, Léo Chú was loaned to fellow Série A side Ceará until the end of the season. He made his senior debut twelve days later, coming on as a second-half substitute for Wescley in a 1–0 Campeonato Cearense home win against Caucaia.

Léo Chú made his top tier debut occurred on 12 October 2020, as he started in a 2–1 home success over Corinthians. He scored his first goal in the category on 25 November, netting the equalizer in a 1–1 home draw against São Paulo.

==== 2021 season ====
Back to Grêmio for the 2021 campaign, Léo Chú made his debut for the club on 14 March, starting in a 2–0 Campeonato Gaúcho away win against Esportivo. Late in the month, he scored the equalizer in a 2–2 draw at São Luiz-RS.

=== Seattle Sounders FC ===
On August 5, 2021, Léo Chú signed with Seattle Sounders FC of Major League Soccer. He made his debut for the club on September 14, coming on as a substitute and providing an assist to Raúl Ruidíaz's goal in stoppage time to win a Leagues Cup semifinal against Santos Laguna. Chú made his MLS debut on September 29 against the San Jose Earthquakes with another substitute appearance.

He set a club record with four assists—all to Jordan Morris—in a 4–1 defeat of Sporting Kansas City in March 2023.

=== FC Dallas ===
On January 7, 2025, Chú was traded to FC Dallas by Seattle Sounders FC alongside $2 million in general allocation money, and an international roster slot, for striker Jesús Ferreira.

=== Alverca ===
On 12 July 2025, Chú was signed by Primeira Liga side Alverca for an undisclosed fee.

== Career statistics ==
As of 1 December 2024

Club	Season	League			State League		Cup		Continental		Other		Total	
Club	Season	Division	Apps	Goals	Apps	Goals	Apps	Goals	Apps	Goals	Apps	Goals	Apps	Goals
Ceará	2020	Série A	22	3	2	0	5	0	—		1 (Note: Appearance(s) in Copa do Nordeste)	0	30	3
Grêmio	2021	Série A	0	0	9	2	0	0	3 (Note: Two appearances in Copa Libertadores, one appearance in Copa Sudamericana)	0	—		12	2
Seattle Sounders FC	2021	MLS	8	1	–	–	1	0	0		0	0	8	1
Seattle Sounders FC	2022	MLS	25	0	–	–	–	–	–	–	–	–	25	0
Seattle Sounders FC	2023	MLS	36	5	–	–	–	–	–	–	–	–	36	5
Seattle Sounders FC	2024	MLS	15	1	–	–	–	–	–	–	–	–	15	1
Career total			106	10	11	2	6	0	3	0	1	0	126	12

== Honours ==
Grêmio

- Campeonato Gaúcho: 2021
- Recopa Gaúcha: 2021

Seattle Sounders FC

- CONCACAF Champions League: 2022
