= Yeimar Gómez Andrade =

Colombian footballer (born 1992)

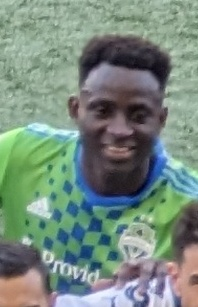
- Gómez with Seattle Sounders FC in 2023

Personal information
- Full name: Yeimar Pastor Gómez Andrade
- Date of birth: 30 June 1992 (age 34)
- Place of birth: Tadó, Colombia
- Height: 1.87 m (6 ft 2 in)
- Position: Centre-back

Team information
- Current team: Seattle Sounders FC
- Number: 28

Senior career*
Years	Team	Apps	(Gls)
2013–2016	Rosario Central	21	(0)
2013–2014	→ Tiro Federal (loan)	27	(2)
2016	→ Arsenal (loan)	2	(0)
2016–2017	Independiente Rivadavia	40	(1)
2017–2020	Unión Santa Fe	64	(5)
2020–	Seattle Sounders FC	147	(7)

International career^{‡}
2022	Colombia	1	(0)
- * Club domestic league appearances and goals as of 21:07, 25 March 2025 (UTC) ‡ National team caps and goals as of 11:50, 19 January 2022 (UTC)

Yéimar Pastor Gómez Andrade (born 30 June 1992) is a Colombian professional footballer who plays as a centre-back for Major League Soccer club Seattle Sounders FC.

== Early life ==
Yeimar was born on 30 June 1992 in Tadó, a small municipality in Chocó, Colombia. Growing up, he was often cared for by his older sister or relatives while his parents, Jairo and Celestina, worked long hours at a local mine. Yeimar spent his childhood in Tadó playing football and basketball; when he was six or seven, he began playing football for a local school as a defender.

During his youth, he was inspired by famous football defenders including Luis Amaranto Perea, Rio Ferdinand, and Nemanja Vidić. His first opportunity to train with a professional club came when he joined Boyacá Chicó F.C. as a youth. When Yeimar was 14, he left Colombia upon the invitation of a teammate and began trying out for clubs in Argentina including Miter de Pérez and Newell's Old Boys.

== Club career ==
=== Rosario Central ===
In 2009, Yeimar joined Rosario Central's youth academy at the age of seventeen. From 2011 to 2013, he made 29 appearances in the fourth division of the Argentine Football Association. He also made 28 appearances during the 2012–2013 season of the Rosarina Football Association. Yeimar was then loaned to Tiro Federal in 2013. During their 2013–2014 season in the third division of Argentine football, Yeimar made his professional debut and ended the season with 27 appearances and two goals.

Yeimar returned to Rosario Central in 2014. During the 2014 season, Yeimar made four appearances in the Argentine Primera División and played in two Copa Argentina matches. In 2015, Yeimar made seventeen appearances in the Primera Division, fifteen of which were as a starter; he also made two appearances in Copa Argentina. Due to his rough style of defending, he got the nickname patabrava and was the subject of a fan-made song derived from "Bailando". In January 2016, Rosario Central loaned Yeimar to Arsenal de Sarandí. There, Yeimar had two appearances in the Primera Division for the 2016 season.

=== Independiente Rivadavia ===
In the summer of 2016, Yeimar left Arsenal and joined Independiente Rivadavia. During the club's 2016–2017 season, he made forty appearances as a starter in Nacional B, the second division of Argentine football, and scored two goals. He also made one appearance for the club in Copa Argentina.

=== Unión de Santa Fe ===
In July 2017, Yeimar joined Unión de Santa Fe. During his first season with club, Yeimar made 25 appearances as a starter in the Primera Division and scored one goal in addition to making two appearances for the club in Copa Argentina. Yeimar started in the club's 1–0 victory at home against Independiente on 12 May 2018. The win qualified the Unión for the 2019 Copa Sudamericana, their first in club history. In the 2018–19 season, Yeimar made 24 appearances as a starter and scored two goals while also making two appearances in Copa Argentina. He also had the record for the most interceptions and clearances out of any player in the 2018–2019 season.

Yeimar made two appearances in the 2019 Copa Sudamericana against Independiente del Valle from Ecuador. The Unión won their first match at home against the Independiente in a 2–0 shutout where Yeimar was recognized for his ability to shutdown the other team's offense. In the second away match, the Unión lost to Independiente 2–0 with one of the goals coming from an own goal by Yeimar; the Unión failed to advance to the second round of the tournament after losing a penalty shootout to break the tied aggregate score.

On 15 October 2019, Yeimar signed a new contract with the Unión for a term ending June 2022. Yeimar made 15 appearances and scored two goals in the Unión's 2019–2020 season in addition to one appearance in Copa Argentina. On 22 January 2020, the Unión announced Yeimar was transferring to Seattle Sounders FC of Major League Soccer. During Yeimar's career with the Unión, he played a total of 74 games and scored five goals.

=== Seattle Sounders FC ===
On 5 February 2020, Yeimar signed with Seattle Sounders FC of Major League Soccer. His first season with the team was interrupted by the COVID-19 pandemic, which left him unable to bring his family to the United States.

== International career ==
Yeimar made his debut for the Colombia national team on 16 January 2022 in a 2–1 home win over Honduras.

== Career statistics ==
=== Club ===
As of match played 26 November 2023

Appearances and goals by club, season and competition
Club	Season	League			National cup		League cup		Continental		Other		Total	
Club	Season	Division	Apps	Goals	Apps	Goals	Apps	Goals	Apps	Goals	Apps	Goals	Apps	Goals
Tiro Federal (loan)	2013–14	Torneo Argentino A	27	2	0	0	—		—		—		27	2
Rosario Central	2014	Argentine Primera División	4	0	2	0	—		0	0	—		6	0
Rosario Central	2015	Argentine Primera División	17	0	2	0	—		—		—		19	0
Rosario Central	Total		21	0	4	0	0	0	0	0	0	0	25	0
Arsenal (loan)	2016	Argentine Primera División	2	0	0	0	—		—		—		2	0
Independiente Rivadavia	2016–17	Primera B Nacional	40	1	1	0	—		—		—		41	1
Unión Santa Fe	2017–18	Argentine Primera División	25	1	2	0	—		—		—		27	1
Unión Santa Fe	2018–19	Argentine Primera División	24	2	2	0	—		—		—		26	2
Unión Santa Fe	2019–20	Argentine Primera División	15	2	1	0	3	0	2 (Note: Appearance(s) in Copa Sudamericana)	0	—		21	2
Unión Santa Fe	Total		64	5	5	0	3	0	2	0	0	0	74	5
Seattle Sounders FC	2020	MLS	19	2	—		—		1 (Note: Appearance(s) in CONCACAF Champions League)	0	4 (Note: Appearance(s) in MLS Cup playoffs)	0	24	2
Seattle Sounders FC	2021	MLS	33	1	—		3 (Note: Appearance(s) in Leagues Cup)	0	—		1	0	37	1
Seattle Sounders FC	2022	MLS	28	1	0	0	—		5	0	—		34	1
Seattle Sounders FC	2023	MLS	33	2	0	0	2	0	—		4	0	39	2
Seattle Sounders FC	Total		113	6	0	0	5	0	6	0	9	0	133	6
Career total			267	14	10	0	8	0	8	0	9	0	302	14

=== International ===
As of match played 16 January 2022

Appearances and goals by national team and year
National team	Year	Apps	Goals
Colombia	2022	1	0
Total		1	0

== Honours ==
Seattle Sounders FC

- CONCACAF Champions League: 2022
- Leagues Cup: 2025

Individual

- MLS All-Star: 2021
- MLS Best XI: 2021, 2024
