= Andrew Thomas (soccer, born 1998) =

American soccer player (born 1998)

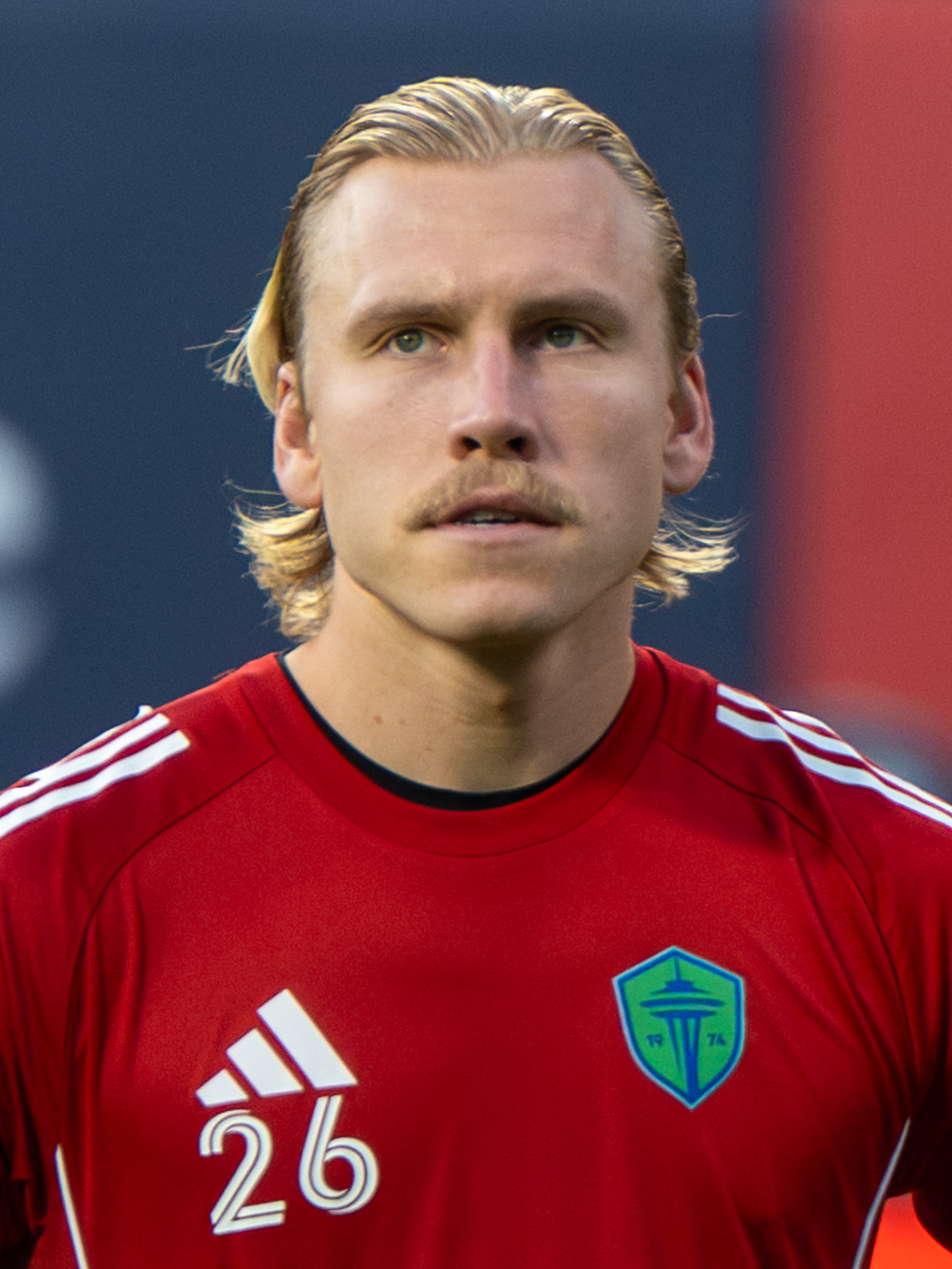
- Thomas with the Seattle Sounders in 2025

Personal information
- Full name: Andrew Delmos Thomas
- Date of birth: September 1, 1998 (age 28)
- Place of birth: Moscow, Russia
- Height: 1.88 m (6 ft 2 in)
- Position: Goalkeeper

Team information
- Current team: Seattle Sounders FC
- Number: 26

Youth career
- 2008–2017: Watford

College career
Years	Team	Apps	(Gls)
2017–2020	Stanford Cardinal	55	(0)

Senior career*
Years	Team	Apps	(Gls)
2016–2017	Watford	0	(0)
2016	→ Wealdstone (loan)	1	(0)
2019	San Francisco City	2	(0)
2021–	Seattle Sounders FC	45	(0)
2021–2023	→ Tacoma Defiance (loan)	45	(0)
2023	→ New Mexico United (loan)	8	(0)
- * Club domestic league appearances and goals as of August 12, 2026

Andrew Delmos Thomas (born September 1, 1998) is a professional soccer player who plays as a goalkeeper for Major League Soccer club Seattle Sounders FC. Born in Russia and raised in England, he was called up to the United States under-23s.

== Early life ==
Thomas was born in Moscow, Russia, to an American father and a Russian mother, but his family moved to London at a young age; as such, he holds citizenship for Russia, the United States, and the United Kingdom. Thomas attended the Merchant Taylors' School, Northwood.

Alongside football, Thomas was a keen cricketer, who played for the Middlesex County Cricket Club youth team from 10 years old, as well as representing the England cricket team at under-17s level.

== Career ==
=== Youth ===
In 2008, Thomas joined the Watford academy aged 9, going on to help their under-18's to the Professional Development League South Championship in 2016, keeping nine consecutive clean sheets. On October 21, 2016, Thomas moved on a short-term emergency loan to Wealdstone, making a single appearance for the National League South club. Thomas opted to leave the club following this season to move to the United States.

=== College and amateur ===
In 2017, Thomas moved to the United States to study and play college soccer at Stanford University. He redshirted his freshman season, but went on to make 55 appearances for the Cardinal over three seasons, helping the team become Pac-12 Champions in 2018 and 2020. During his time at Stanford, Thomas also earned accolades including three-time United Soccer Coaches All-Far West Region, three-time All-Pac-12 First Team, Pac-12 All-Academic First Team in 2018, United Soccer Coaches All-America Third Team in 2019, and the NCAA Elite 90 Award in 2019.

During his 2019 season, Thomas also appeared for USL League Two side San Francisco City, making two appearances for the club.

=== Professional ===
Due to the COVID-19 pandemic affecting the college soccer season, Thomas wasn't eligible for the 2021 MLS SuperDraft in January 2021. However, on May 20, 2021 it was announced that Thomas, Jacob Montes and Spencer Glass would all be made available to MLS clubs via the waiver process. The following day, Seattle Sounders FC acquired the top spot in the waivers process from Chicago Fire in exchange for $50,000 in General Allocation Money, and subsequently selected Thomas.

In June 2021, Thomas joined Seattle's USL Championship affiliate side Tacoma Defiance on loan, starting for the club during a 2–0 win over LA Galaxy II. He had three shutouts in his first seven matches, but was unable to finish the season after the discovery of a fractured vertebra. Thomas played 12 matches with the Defiance during the 2022 season before he underwent surgery to address another back injury. He made his full return on March 26, 2023, and played 15 matches for Tacoma in MLS Next Pro.

Thomas was loaned to New Mexico United of the USL Championship on September 1, 2023, for the remainder of the USL season. He played eight matches for New Mexico United as they qualified for the playoffs. Thomas returned to the Sounders for the 2024 season and made his MLS debut in the first match of the regular season against Los Angeles FC. He made four saves in the 2–1 loss; he had been a replacement for Stefan Frei, who missed the match with an injury. Thomas earned his first MLS shutout on March 2 at home against Austin FC in a scoreless draw. He finished the 2024 season with 15 appearances across all competitions.

He made several starts during the 2025 regular season after Frei had a head collision with a Columbus Crew player in July 2025. Thomas retained his starting spot for the entirety of the 2025 Leagues Cup, where he won the Best Goalkeeper Award and had four shutouts as the Sounders won the tournament title. Frei returned as starter in regular season play. Thomas was substituted for Frei in the first round of the MLS Cup playoffs just prior to a penalty shootout to decide the winner of the third match against Minnesota United FC. Thomas dislocated a finger during the first kick of the shootout, but received treatment and made several saves; in the final round, he missed his kick, which eliminated the Sounders from the playoffs.

Thomas became the starting goalkeeper for the Sounders at the beginning of the 2026 season in regular season matches, while Frei would start in cup competitions. In the first seven matches of the season, played primarily on the road, he had five clean sheets and a save percentage of 88.5%.

== International ==
Thomas is eligible to represent England, the United States, and Russia. In 2019, he was twice called up to United States under-23 training camp but never appeared for the team.

== Career statistics ==
=== Club ===
As of match played August 12, 2026

Appearances and goals by club, season, and competition
Club	Season	League			National cup		Continental		Other		Total	
Club	Season	Division	Apps	Goals	Apps	Goals	Apps	Goals	Apps	Goals	Apps	Goals
Wealdstone (loan)	2015–16	Football Conference	1	0	—		—		—		1	0
Seattle Sounders FC	2021	MLS	0	0	—		—		0	0	0	0
Seattle Sounders FC	2022	MLS	0	0	0	0	0	0	—		0	0
Seattle Sounders FC	2023	MLS	0	0	0	0	—		0	0	0	0
Seattle Sounders FC	2024	MLS	7	0	4	0	—		4	0	15	0
Seattle Sounders FC	2025	MLS	9	0	2	0	1	0	7	0	19	0
Seattle Sounders FC	2026	MLS	17	0	0	0	0	0	0	0	17	0
Seattle Sounders FC	Total		33	0	6	0	1	0	11	0	51	0
Tacoma Defiance (loan)	2021	USL Championship	7	0	—		—		0	0	7	0
Tacoma Defiance (loan)	2022	MLS Next Pro	12	0	—		—		0	0	12	0
Tacoma Defiance (loan)	2023	MLS Next Pro	15	0	0	0	—		—		15	0
Tacoma Defiance (loan)	2024	MLS Next Pro	2	0	—		—		0	0	2	0
Tacoma Defiance (loan)	Total		45	0	—		—		1	0	46	0
New Mexico United (loan)	2023	USL Championship	8	0	—		—		1 (Note: Includes appearance in USL Championship playoffs.)	0	9	0
Career total			86	0	6	0	1	0	13	0	106	0

== Honours ==
Seattle Sounders FC

- Leagues Cup: 2025

Individual

- Leagues Cup Best Goalkeeper: 2025
