= Reed Baker-Whiting =

American soccer player (born 2005)

- Baker-Whiting with Nashville SC in 2026

Personal information
- Date of birth: March 31, 2005 (age 21)
- Place of birth: Seattle, Washington, US
- Height: 5 ft 11 in (1.80 m)
- Positions: Right-back; left-back; midfielder

Team information
- Current team: Nashville SC
- Number: 27

Youth career
- 2016–2022: Seattle Sounders FC

Senior career*
Years	Team	Apps	(Gls)
2020–2021	Tacoma Defiance	46	(3)
2021–2025	Seattle Sounders FC	47	(0)
2026–	Nashville SC	14	(1)

International career^{‡}
2019	United States U15	3	(0)
2022	United States U17	1	(0)
2022–2023	United States U19	7	(1)
2024–2025	United States U20	11	(0)
2025–	United States U23	1	(0)
2026–	United States	1	(0)
- * Club domestic league appearances and goals as of December 7, 2024 ‡ National team caps and goals as of November 17, 2026

Reed Baker-Whiting (born March 31, 2005) is an American professional soccer player who plays as a right-back, left-back, or midfielder for Major League Soccer club Nashville SC and the United States national team.

== Career ==
In July 2020, Baker-Whiting signed with Tacoma Defiance.

In May 2021, Baker-Whiting signed with Seattle Sounders FC. He made his MLS debut for the Sounders on May 16 as a substitute against Los Angeles FC. He was 16 years and 46 days old, making him among the youngest players to play in league history.

On February 18, 2026, Baker-Whiting was traded to Nashville SC. In October 2026, he placed seventeenth in the 2026 22 Under 22 rankings.

== International Career ==
In November 2026, Baker-Whiting received a first senior call-up to the United States roster for the CONCACAF Nations League Quarterfinals against Haiti.

== Career statistics ==
=== Club ===
As of match played December 7, 2024

Appearances and goals by club, season and competition
Club	Season	League			National cup		Continental		Other		Total	
Club	Season	Division	Apps	Goals	Apps	Goals	Apps	Goals	Apps	Goals	Apps	Goals
Tacoma Defiance	2020	USL	7	0	—		—		—		7	0
Tacoma Defiance	2021	USL	16	0	—		—		—		16	0
Tacoma Defiance	2022	MLS Next Pro	15	1	—		—		—		15	1
Tacoma Defiance	2023	MLS Next Pro	8	2	—		—		—		8	2
Tacoma Defiance	Total		46	3	0	0	0	0	0	0	46	3
Seattle Sounders FC	2021	MLS	4	0	—		—		—		4	0
Seattle Sounders FC	2022	MLS	2	0	—		—		—		2	0
Seattle Sounders FC	2023	MLS	19	0	2	1	—		2	0	23	1
Seattle Sounders FC	2024	MLS	22	0	1	0	—		8	0	31	0
Seattle Sounders FC	Total		47	0	3	1	0	0	10	0	60	1
Career total			93	3	3	1	0	0	10	0	106	4

=== International ===
As of match played November 17, 2026

Appearances and goals by national team and year
National team	Year	Apps	Goals
United States	2026	1	0
Total		1	0

== Honors ==
Seattle Sounders FC

- CONCACAF Champions League: 2022
- Leagues Cup: 2025

Nashville SC

- Supporters' Shield: 2026
