= 2021 Seattle Sounders FC season =

American soccer team season

Seattle Sounders FC
2021 season
- General manager: Garth Lagerwey
- Head coach: Brian Schmetzer
- Stadium: Lumen Field
- Major League Soccer: Conference: 2nd Overall: 3rd
- MLS Cup playoffs: First round
- U.S. Open Cup: Canceled
- Leagues Cup: Runners-up
- Top goalscorer: League: Raúl Ruidíaz (17); All: Raúl Ruidíaz (19)
- Highest home attendance: League: 45,737 (Aug. 29 vs. Portland)
- Lowest home attendance: League: 7,042 (Apr. 16 vs. Minnesota)
- Average home league attendance: League: 25,618
- Biggest win: 4–0 vs. Minnesota (Apr. 16); 6–2 at Portland (Aug. 15)
- Biggest defeat: 0–3 at Los Angeles (Oct. 26)
Home colors	Away colors

The 2021 Seattle Sounders FC season was the club's thirty-eighth year of existence, and their thirteenth season in Major League Soccer, the top flight of American soccer. The team was under the management of Brian Schmetzer in his fifth full MLS season as head coach of the Sounders. Seattle were the reigning Western Conference champions and lost to Columbus Crew SC in the MLS Cup 3–0.

Due to the COVID-19 pandemic, the capacity of Lumen Field was limited to 7,000 in March and increase in stages. The stadium's full capacity was restored in July with the addition of COVID-19 testing and vaccination requirements.

The Sounders finished second in the Western Conference and qualified for the 2022 CONCACAF Champions League as a result. They were also runners-up in the 2021 Leagues Cup, losing to Club León in the final.

== Background ==
The Sounders lost the MLS Cup at Mapfre Stadium to Columbus Crew SC 3–0. The team is set to play in the Leagues Cup, along with regular MLS and U.S. Open Cup matches.

== Summary ==
The Sounders released or traded several key players, including six who were at the MLS Cup, during the 2020–21 offseason as part of roster moves. The team began their preseason training camp at Starfire Sports in late March and played scrimmages against their USL affiliate, Tacoma Defiance, and the Portland Timbers. A third match against Phoenix Rising FC was cancelled due to the spread of COVID-19 among their players. The Sounders were scheduled to continue their preseason in the Los Angeles area, playing friendlies against USL clubs LA Galaxy II and San Diego Loyal, but remained in Seattle. The team won two friendlies on April 10 against San Diego at Lumen Field, which was open to 200 healthcare workers in attendance.

Coach Brian Schmetzer switched the team from their traditional 4–2–3–1 formation to a 3–5–2 or a 3–4–1–2 to address several roster issues, namely the absence of Jordan Morris and Nicolás Lodeiro due to injuries. The Sounders opened the MLS season by winning or drawing in their first 13 matches—setting an MLS record for the longest unbeaten streak to open a season. A reduced capacity of 7,000 seats was permitted for home matches at Lumen Field; the tickets were primarily distributed to existing season ticket holders.

== Final roster ==
Note: Flags indicate national team as defined under FIFA eligibility rules; some limited exceptions apply. Players may hold more than one non-FIFA nationality. Squad correct as of August 5, 2021.

No.	Pos.	Nation	Player
3	DF	ECU	Xavier Arreaga
5	DF	CMR	Nouhou Tolo
6	MF	BRA	João Paulo (DP)
7	MF	USA	Cristian Roldan
8	MF	MTQ	Jordy Delem
9	FW	PER	Raúl Ruidíaz (DP)
10	MF	URU	Nicolás Lodeiro (DP)
11	DF	AUS	Brad Smith
12	FW	COL	Fredy Montero
13	FW	USA	Jordan Morris (HGP)
16	DF	ESA	Alex Roldan
17	FW	USA	Will Bruin
18	GK	USA	Spencer Richey
20	MF	FRA	Nicolas Benezet
21	MF	USA	Reed Baker-Whiting
22	MF	USA	Kelyn Rowe
23	MF	BRA	Léo Chú
24	GK	SUI	Stefan Frei
26	GK	RUS	Andrew Thomas
27	DF	USA	Shane O'Neill
28	DF	COL	Yeimar Gómez
30	GK	USA	Stefan Cleveland
45	MF	USA	Ethan Dobbelaere (HGP)
75	MF	USA	Danny Leyva (HGP)
84	MF	USA	Josh Atencio (HGP)
92	DF	FRA	Abdoulaye Cissoko
94	DF	COL	Jimmy Medranda

=== Out on loan ===
Note: Flags indicate national team as defined under FIFA eligibility rules; some limited exceptions apply. Players may hold more than one non-FIFA nationality. Squad correct as of July 16, 2021.

No.	Pos.	Nation	Player
1	GK	USA	Trey Muse (HGP on loan to San Diego Loyal SC)
37	MF	USA	Shandon Hopeau (HGP on loan to San Antonio FC)
87	FW	USA	Alfonso Ocampo-Chavez (HGP; on loan to FC Pinzgau Saalfelden until December 31, 2021)

== Competitions ==
Win Draw Loss Void Upcoming fixture

=== Preseason ===
March 25, 2021 Closed-door scrimmage	Seattle Sounders FC	5–1	Tacoma Defiance	Tukwila, Washington
				Stadium: Starfire Sports Complex

March 30, 2021 Closed-door scrimmage	Seattle Sounders FC	1–1	Portland Timbers	Tukwila, Washington
(PST)	Montero 62'	Report	Asprilla 85'	Stadium: Starfire Sports Complex; Attendance: 0

March 30, 2021 Closed-door scrimmage	Seattle Sounders FC	0–0	Portland Timbers	Tukwila, Washington
(PST)		Report		Stadium: Starfire Sports Complex; Attendance: 0

April 4, 2021 Closed-door scrimmage	Seattle Sounders FC	NP	Phoenix Rising FC	Tukwila, Washington
				Stadium: Starfire Sports Complex
Note: Cancelled due to COVID-19 concerns.

April 10, 2021 Closed-door scrimmage	Seattle Sounders FC	1–0	San Diego Loyal SC	Seattle, Washington
4 pm (PST)	Alvarez 71'			Stadium: Lumen Field; Attendance: 200

April 10, 2021 Closed-door scrimmage	Seattle Sounders FC	1–0	San Diego Loyal SC	Seattle, Washington
7:08 pm (PST)	Bruin			Stadium: Lumen Field; Attendance: 200

=== Major League Soccer ===
==== League tables ====
===== Western Conference =====
Pos	Team	Pld	W	L	T	GF	GA	GD	Pts	
1	Colorado Rapids	34	17	7	10	51	35	+16	61	Qualification for the conference semifinals and the CONCACAF Champions League
2	Seattle Sounders FC	34	17	8	9	53	33	+20	60	Qualification for the first round and the CONCACAF Champions League
3	Sporting Kansas City	34	17	10	7	58	40	+18	58	Qualification for the first round
4	Portland Timbers	34	17	13	4	56	52	+4	55	Qualification for the first round
5	Minnesota United FC	34	13	11	10	42	44	−2	49	Qualification for the first round

Source: MLS
Rules for classification: 1) points; 2) total wins; 3) total goal differential; 4) total goals scored; 5) fewer disciplinary points; 6) away goal differential; 7) away goals scored; 8) home goals differential; 9) home goals scored; 10) coin toss (2 clubs tied) or drawing of lots (≥3 clubs tied)

===== Overall =====
Pos	Team	Pld	W	L	T	GF	GA	GD	Pts	
1	New England Revolution (S)	34	22	5	7	65	41	+24	73	Qualification for the CONCACAF Champions League (Note: As Supporters' Shield winners (USA2))
2	Colorado Rapids	34	17	7	10	51	35	+16	61	Qualification for the CONCACAF Champions League (Note: As 2021 MLS Western Conference regular season champions (USA3))
3	Seattle Sounders FC	34	17	8	9	53	33	+20	60	Qualification for the CONCACAF Champions League (Note: As highest-ranked U.S. based Division I club (based on 2021 MLS regular season record) not already qualified (USA4))
4	Sporting Kansas City	34	17	10	7	58	40	+18	58	
5	Portland Timbers	34	17	13	4	56	52	+4	55	

Source: MLS
Rules for classification: 1) points; 2) total wins; 3) total goal differential; 4) total goals scored; 5) fewer disciplinary points; 6) away goal differential; 7) away goals scored; 8) home goals differential; 9) home goals scored; 10) coin toss (2 clubs tied) or drawing of lots (≥3 clubs tied)
(S) Supporters' Shield winners

==== Results ====
Overall								Home						Away					
Pld	W	D	L	GF	GA	GD	Pts	W	D	L	GF	GA	GD	W	D	L	GF	GA	GD
34	17	9	8	53	33	+20	60	8	5	4	28	15	+13	9	4	4	25	18	+7

Last updated: November 7, 2021.
Source: MLS

Matchday	1	2	3	4	5	6	7	8	9	10	11	12	13	14	15	16	17	18	19	20	21	22	23	24	25	26	27	28	29	30	31	32	33	34
Stadium	H	A	H	A	A	H	H	H	A	H	H	A	H	A	A	H	H	H	A	A	A	H	H	H	A	A	A	H	A	A	H	A	H	A
Result	W	D	W	W	W	W	D	D	W	W	D	D	W	L	W	L	L	D	W	W	W	L	W	L	W	W	W	W	L	D	L	L	D	D

Source: MLS
A = Away; H = Home; N = Neutral; W = Win; D = Draw; L = Loss; C = Canceled

April 16, 2021 1	Seattle Sounders FC	4–0	Minnesota United FC	Seattle, Washington
6:30 p.m. (PST)	Arreaga (yellow card) 44'; João Paulo 49'; Ruidíaz 70', 73'; Montero 86'; C. Roldan (yellow card) 90'	Report	Reynoso (yellow card) 32'; Gasper (yellow card) 76'	Stadium: Lumen Field; Attendance: 7,042; Referee: Joseph Dickerson

April 24, 2021 2	Los Angeles FC	1–1	Seattle Sounders FC	Los Angeles, California
3:00 p.m. (PST)	Atuesta 1'; Blessing (yellow card) 88'	Report	Smith 54'; Arreaga (yellow card) 78'; Dobbelaere (yellow card) 83'; A. Roldan (yellow card) 85'	Stadium: Banc of California Stadium; Attendance: 4,900; Referee: Armando Villarreal

May 2, 2021 3	Seattle Sounders FC	3–0	LA Galaxy	Seattle, Washington
6:00 p.m. (PST)	Ruidíaz 20', 90+3'; Smith 23'	Report		Stadium: Lumen Field; Attendance: 7,148; Referee: Jair Marrufo

May 9, 2021 4	Portland Timbers	1–2	Seattle Sounders FC	Portland, Oregon
12:00 p.m. (PST)	Loría (yellow card) 21'; Tuiloma 90+4'	Report	Tolo (yellow card) 17'; Ruidíaz 63' (pen.); Montero 79'; Delem (yellow card) 90+4'	Stadium: Providence Park; Referee: Chris Penso

May 12, 2021 5	San Jose Earthquakes	0–1	Seattle Sounders FC	San Jose, California
7:30 p.m. (PST)	Wondolowski (yellow card) 73'; Abecasis (yellow card) 80'	Report	C. Roldan 18'; Ruidíaz (yellow card) 39'; Frei (yellow card) 78'	Stadium: PayPal Park; Attendance: 5,000; Referee: Baldomero Toledo

May 16, 2021 6	Seattle Sounders FC	2–0	Los Angeles FC	Seattle, Washington
6:00 p.m. (PST)	João Paulo (yellow card) 45'; Yeimar (yellow card) 52'; Arreaga 57'; Smith 73'	Report	Murillo (yellow card) 78'	Stadium: Lumen Field; Attendance: 7,173; Referee: Joe Dickerson

May 23, 2021 7	Seattle Sounders FC	1–1	Atlanta United FC	Seattle, Washington
1:30 p.m. (PST)	Ruidíaz 6'; Tolo (yellow card) 31'; Arreaga (yellow card) 68'; A. Roldan (yellow card) 90+2'		López (yellow card) 2'; Hyndman (yellow card) 32'; Martínez 86' (pen.); Rossetto (yellow card) 90+1'	Stadium: Lumen Field; Attendance: 11,011; Referee: Kevin Stott

May 30, 2021 8	Seattle Sounders FC	0–0	Austin FC	Seattle, Washington
6:30 p.m. (PST)	Arreaga (yellow card) 2'	Report	Lima (yellow card) 24'; Stroud (yellow card) 45+2'	Stadium: Lumen Field; Attendance: 12,895; Referee: Rosendo Mendoza

June 19, 2021 9	LA Galaxy	1–2	Seattle Sounders FC	Carson, California
7:30 p.m. (PST)	Kljestan 21' (pen.)	Report	Yeimar 41'; Ruidíaz 49'	Stadium: Dignity Health Sports Park; Attendance: 23,165; Referee: Drew Fischer

June 23, 2021 10	Seattle Sounders FC	2–1	Real Salt Lake	Seattle, Washington
7:00 p.m. (PST)	C. Roldan 58'; Ruidíaz (yellow card) 76' (goal) 88' (pen.)	Report	Luiz (yellow card) 39'; Rusnák 79' (pen.); Ochoa (yellow card) 88'; Ruíz (yellow card) 90+6'	Stadium: Lumen Field; Attendance: 24,652; Referee: Ted Unkel

June 26, 2021 11	Seattle Sounders FC	2–2	Vancouver Whitecaps FC	Seattle, Washington
6:00 p.m. (PST)	Ruidíaz 40'; Medranda 71'	Report	Cavallini (yellow card) 22' (goal) 56'; Alexandre (yellow card) 45+4'; Dájome 49'; Crépeau (yellow card) 89'	Stadium: Lumen Field; Attendance: 25,603; Referee: Guido Gonzales Jr.

July 4, 2021 12	Colorado Rapids	1–1	Seattle Sounders FC	Commerce City, Colorado
6:00 p.m. (PST)	Rubio (yellow card) 21'; Wilson (yellow card) 26'; Barrios 58'	Report	Yeimar (yellow card) 34'; A. Roldan 41'; O'Neill (yellow card) 45+2'	Stadium: Dick's Sporting Goods Park; Attendance: 17,104; Referee: Kevin Stott

July 7, 2021 13	Seattle Sounders FC	2–0	Houston Dynamo FC	Seattle, Washington
6:00 p.m. (PST)	Yeimar (yellow card) 33'; Leyva (yellow card) 51'; Rowe 62'; Ruidíaz 90+4'	Report	Picault (yellow card) 80'	Stadium: Lumen Field; Attendance: 27,421; Referee: Robert Sibiga

July 18, 2021 14	Minnesota United FC	1–0	Seattle Sounders FC	Saint Paul, Minnesota
1:00 p.m. (PST)	Lod 81'	Report	Leyva (yellow card) 13'; Yeimar (yellow card) 18'; Arreaga (yellow card) 63'	Stadium: Allianz Field; Attendance: 19,679; Referee: Alan Kelly

July 22, 2021 15	Austin FC	0–1	Seattle Sounders FC	Austin, Texas
6:30 p.m. (PST)	Jiménez (yellow card) 57'; Domínguez (yellow card) 85'	Report	Adeniran (yellow card) 34'; Ruidíaz 67', (yellow card) 90+4'	Stadium: Q2 Stadium; Attendance: 20,738; Referee: Alex Chilowicz

July 25, 2021 16	Seattle Sounders FC	1–3	Sporting Kansas City	Seattle, Washington
6:00 p.m. (PST)	Leyva (yellow card) 29'; Montero 51'; João Paulo (yellow card) 84'	Report	Russell 31'; Sallói 42'; Duke 72'; Zusi (yellow card) 80'	Stadium: Lumen Field; Attendance: 32,790; Referee: Ramy Touchan

July 31, 2021 17 Heritage Cup	Seattle Sounders FC	0–1	San Jose Earthquakes	Seattle, Washington
2:00 p.m. (PST)	Medranda (yellow card) 31'; João Paulo (yellow card) 53'; Atencio (yellow card) 90+3'	Report	Espinoza 45+1'; Abecasis (yellow card) 49'; Cowell (yellow card) 62'; Cardoso (yellow card) 90+4'	Stadium: Lumen Field; Attendance: 32,704; Referee: Joseph Dickerson

August 4, 2021 18	Seattle Sounders FC	1–1	FC Dallas	Seattle, Washington
7:00 p.m. (PST)	Montero 72'; Smith (yellow card) 87'	Report	Jara 90+1'	Stadium: Lumen Field; Attendance: 31,628; Referee: Fotis Bazakos

August 15, 2021 19 Cascadia Cup	Portland Timbers	2–6	Seattle Sounders FC	Portland, Oregon
7:00 p.m. (PST)	Blanco 32'; Fochive 52'; Mabiala (yellow card) 54'; Zuparic (yellow card) 66'; Paredes (yellow card) 76'	Report	Montero 13', 29'; Ruidíaz 55', 72'; João Paulo (yellow card) 69'; Medranda 77'; Benezet 90+4'	Stadium: Providence Park; Attendance: 25,218; Referee: Jair Marrufo

August 18, 2021 20	FC Dallas	0–1	Seattle Sounders FC	Frisco, Texas
5:30 p.m. (PST)	Cerrillo (yellow card) 40'; Acosta (yellow card) 78'; Jara (yellow card) 90+3'	Report	Ruidíaz 63'	Stadium: Toyota Stadium; Attendance: 11,535; Referee: Robert Sibiga

August 21, 2021 21	Columbus Crew SC	1–2	Seattle Sounders FC	Columbus, Ohio
2:30 p.m. (PST)	Wright-Phillips 77'; Espinoza (yellow card) 85'	Report	Ruidíaz (yellow card) 79'; Arreaga 88'; Bruin 89'	Stadium: Lower.com Field; Attendance: 19,401; Referee: Joseph Dickerson

August 29, 2021 22 Cascadia Cup	Seattle Sounders FC	0–2	Portland Timbers	Seattle, Washington
7:30 p.m. (PST)		Report	Van Rankin (yellow card) 44'; Blanco 58'; Valeri (yellow card) 76'; Mora 90+5'	Stadium: Lumen Field; Attendance: 45,737; Referee: Alan Kelly

September 11, 2021 23	Seattle Sounders FC	1–0	Minnesota United FC	Seattle, Washington
2:00 p.m. (PST)	João Paulo 22'; Yeimar (yellow card) 37'; O'Neill (yellow card) 90+4'	Report	Alonso (yellow card) 47'; Hunou (yellow card) 49'; Gasper (yellow card) 77'; Hayes (yellow card) 85'	Stadium: Lumen Field; Attendance: 33,130; Referee: Alex Chilowicz

September 18, 2021 24	Real Salt Lake	1–0	Seattle Sounders FC	Sandy, Utah
6:30 p.m. (PST)	Everton Luiz (yellow card) 33'; Kreilach (yellow card) 41', (goal) 48'; Herrera (yellow card) 53'; Julio (yellow card) 85'	Report	Cissoko (yellow card) 45'	Stadium: Rio Tinto Stadium; Attendance: 19,850; Referee: Ismail Elfath

September 26, 2021 25	Sporting Kansas City	1–2	Seattle Sounders FC	Kansas City, Kansas
3:00 p.m. (PST)	Russell 60'; Zusi (yellow card) 90+4'	Report	Tolo (yellow card) 16'; C. Roldan 31'; Yeimar (yellow card) 53'; Bruin 55'; A. Roldan (yellow card) 86'	Stadium: Children's Mercy Park; Attendance: 19,248; Referee: Joseph Dickerson

September 29, 2021 26 Heritage Cup	San Jose Earthquakes	1–3	Seattle Sounders FC	San Jose, California
7:30 p.m. (PST)	Judson (yellow card) 27'; O'Neill 51' (o.g.)	Report	Ruidíaz 25', (yellow card) 38', (goal) 42' (pen.); C. Roldan 49'; A. Roldan (yellow card) 83'	Stadium: PayPal Park; Attendance: 11,361; Referee: Allen Chapman

October 3, 2021 27	Seattle Sounders FC	3–0	Colorado Rapids	Seattle, Washington
7:00 p.m. (PST)	C. Roldan 2'; Medranda 22'; João Paulo 45+1'	Report	Wilson (yellow card) 24'; Barrios (yellow card) 49'; Rubio (yellow card) 54'; Esteves (red card) 61'; Namli (yellow card) 77'	Stadium: Lumen Field; Attendance: 31,425; Referee: Chris Penso

October 9, 2021 28 Cascadia Cup	Seattle Sounders FC	4–1	Vancouver Whitecaps FC	Seattle, Washington
6:00 p.m. (PST)	O'Neill 5'; Benezet 14', (yellow card) 43'; Yeimar (yellow card) 42'; Bruin 55'; Chú 90'	Report	Gaspar (yellow card) 35'; White 45+1'; Gauld (yellow card) 72'	Stadium: Lumen Field; Attendance: 31,842; Referee: Ted Unkel

October 16, 2021 29	Houston Dynamo FC	2–1	Seattle Sounders FC	Houston, Texas
5:30 p.m. (PST)	Urruti 14'; Quintero 20'; Figueroa (yellow card) 79'; Corona (yellow card) 90+2'	Report	Medranda 41'; Arreaga (yellow card) 54'; João Paulo (yellow card) 90+4'	Stadium: BBVA Stadium; Attendance: 14,265; Referee: Nima Saghafi

October 20, 2021 30	Colorado Rapids	1–1	Seattle Sounders FC	Commerce City, Colorado
7:00 PM MDT	Badji 66'	Report	Medranda (yellow card) 63'; Roldan 75'; O'Neill (yellow card) 88'	Stadium: Dick's Sporting Goods Park; Attendance: 9,316; Referee: Drew Fischer

October 23, 2021 31	Seattle Sounders FC	1–2	Sporting Kansas City	Seattle, Washington
6:00 p.m. (PST)	João Paulo (yellow card) 35'; Rowe (yellow card) 51'; A. Roldan (yellow card) 55'; Benezet 58'; Yeimar (yellow card) 76'; Montero (yellow card) 89'	Report	Walter 4'; Melia (yellow card) 56'; Kinda (yellow card) 63'; Espinoza (yellow card) 74'; Russell 79'	Stadium: Lumen Field; Attendance: 32,139; Referee: Ismail Elfath

October 26, 2021 32	Los Angeles FC	3–0	Seattle Sounders FC	Los Angeles, California
7:30 p.m. (PST)	Rodríguez 21'; Blessing 45+3'; Arango 51', (yellow card) 70'; Palacios (yellow card) 79'; Fall (yellow card) 90+4'	Report	Nouhou (yellow card) 66'	Stadium: Banc of California Stadium; Attendance: 22,030; Referee: Kevin Stott

November 1, 2021 33	Seattle Sounders FC	1–1	LA Galaxy	Seattle, Washington
7:00 p.m. (PDT)	Ruidíaz 51' (pen.); Rowe (yellow card) 66'	Report	Hernández 19'; Bond (yellow card) 81'; Grandsir (yellow card) 90+1'; Steres (yellow card) 90+4'	Stadium: Lumen Field; Attendance: 32,781; Referee: Joseph Dickerson

November 7, 2021 34 Cascadia Cup	Vancouver Whitecaps FC	1–1	Seattle Sounders FC	Vancouver, British Columbia
6:00 p.m. (PST)	Gauld 20'	Report	Montero 8' (pen.); Nouhou (yellow card) 31'; Yeimar (yellow card) 35'; Leyva (yellow card) 80'	Stadium: BC Place; Attendance: 25,117; Referee: Fotis Bazakos

=== MLS Cup Playoffs ===
November 23, 2021 First round	Seattle Sounders FC	0–0 (5–6 p)	Real Salt Lake	Seattle, Washington
7:30 p.m. (PST)	Benezet (yellow card) 53'; Ruidíaz (yellow card) 108'	Report	Ochoa (yellow card) 50'; Luiz (yellow card) 72'; Glad (yellow card) 82'	Stadium: Lumen Field; Attendance: 34,012; Referee: Joseph Dickerson
	Penalties
	Ruidíaz (penalty scored); João Paulo (penalty scored); Cissoko (penalty scored); A. Roldan (penalty scored); Lodeiro (penalty scored); Rowe (penalty missed)		(penalty scored) Herrera; (penalty scored) Ruíz; (penalty scored) Kreilach; (penalty scored) Wood; (penalty scored) Silva; (penalty scored) Glad
Note: Real Salt Lake advanced on penalties 6–5

=== Leagues Cup ===
August 10, 2021 Quarterfinals	Seattle Sounders FC (United States)	3–0	(Mexico) UANL	Seattle, Washington
7:00 p.m. (PST)	Ruidíaz 23' (pen.); Rowe (yellow card) 58'; Montero 64'; Lodeiro (yellow card) 67', (goal) 70'	Report	Reyes (yellow card) 88'	Stadium: Lumen Field; Attendance: 17,077; Referee: John Pitti (Panama)

September 14, 2021 Semifinals	Seattle Sounders FC (United States)	1–0	(Mexico) Santos Laguna	Seattle, Washington
7:00 p.m. (PST)	Montero (yellow card) 39'; Arreaga (yellow card) 71'; Ruidíaz 90+3'	Report	Gorriarán (yellow card) 74'	Stadium: Lumen Field; Attendance: 12,201; Referee: Keylor Herrera (Costa Rica)

September 22, 2021 Final	Seattle Sounders FC (United States)	2–3	(Mexico) León	Paradise, Nevada
7:00 p.m. (PST)	Arreaga (yellow card) 10'; João Paulo (yellow card) 15'; Ruidíaz (yellow card) 27'; C. Roldan 48', (yellow card) 82'; Benezet 90+2'	Report	Colombatto (yellow card) 23'; Mena 61', 81' (pen.); Gigliotti 85'; Montes (yellow card) 90+3'	Stadium: Allegiant Stadium; Attendance: 24,824; Referee: Iván Cisneros (El Salvador)

=== U.S. Open Cup ===
May 18–19 Round of 16	Cancelled
(PDT)
Note: Cancelled due to COVID-19 pandemic

== Statistics ==
=== Appearances and goals ===
Numbers after plus-sign(+) denote appearances as a substitute.

No.	Pos	Nat	Player	Total		Regular season		U.S. Open Cup		Playoffs		Leagues Cup	
No.	Pos	Nat	Player	Apps	Goals	Apps	Goals	Apps	Goals	Apps	Goals	Apps	Goals
Goalkeepers
18	GK	(United States) USA	Spencer Richey	2	0	2	0	0	0	0	0	0	0
24	GK	(Switzerland) SUI	Stefan Frei	20	0	17	0	0	0	1	0	2	0
26	GK	(Russia) RUS	Andrew Thomas	0	0	0	0	0	0	0	0	0	0
30	GK	(United States) USA	Stefan Cleveland	16	0	15	0	0	0	0	0	1	0
Defenders
3	DF	(Ecuador) ECU	Xavier Arreaga	30	2	25+1	2	0	0	1	0	3	0
5	DF	(Cameroon) CMR	Nouhou	19	0	16+3	0	0	0	0	0	0	0
11	DF	(Australia) AUS	Brad Smith	31	3	20+7	3	0	0	1	0	2+1	0
16	DF	(El Salvador) ESA	Alex Roldan	33	1	26+3	1	0	0	0+1	0	3	0
27	DF	(United States) USA	Shane O'Neill	31	1	19+8	1	0	0	1	0	3	0
28	DF	(Colombia) COL	Yeimar Gómez Andrade	37	1	29+4	1	0	0	1	0	3	0
35	DF	(United States) USA	Alex Villanueva [TAC]	2	0	0+2	0	0	0	0	0	0	0
92	DF	(France) FRA	Abdoulaye Cissoko	16	0	12+2	0	0	0	0+1	0	0+1	0
94	DF	(Colombia) COL	Jimmy Medranda	28	4	15+10	4	0	0	0	0	1+2	0
Midfielders
6	MF	(Brazil) BRA	João Paulo	35	3	28+3	3	0	0	1	0	3	0
7	MF	(United States) USA	Cristian Roldan	32	7	27+1	6	0	0	1	0	3	1
8	MF	(Martinique) MTQ	Jordy Delem	4	0	1+3	0	0	0	0	0	0	0
10	MF	(Uruguay) URU	Nicolás Lodeiro	11	1	4+5	0	0	0	0+1	0	0+1	1
20	MF	(France) FRA	Nicolas Benezet	16	4	7+6	3	0	0	1	0	0+2	1
21	MF	(United States) USA	Reed Baker-Whiting	4	0	2+2	0	0	0	0	0	0	0
22	MF	(United States) USA	Kelyn Rowe	38	1	24+10	1	0	0	1	0	3	0
23	MF	(Brazil) BRA	Léo Chú	9	1	0+8	1	0	0	0	0	0+1	0
45	MF	(United States) USA	Ethan Dobbelaere	7	0	2+5	0	0	0	0	0	0	0
73	MF	(United States) USA	Obed Vargas [TAC]	1	0	1	0	0	0	0	0	0	0
75	MF	(United States) USA	Danny Leyva	24	0	8+16	0	0	0	0	0	0	0
84	MF	(United States) USA	Josh Atencio	27	0	18+6	0	0	0	0+1	0	0+2	0
Forwards
9	FW	(Peru) PER	Raúl Ruidíaz	30	19	24+2	17	0	0	0+1	0	3	2
12	FW	(Colombia) COL	Fredy Montero	33	8	15+14	7	0	0	1	0	3	1
13	FW	(United States) USA	Jordan Morris	3	0	2	0	0	0	1	0	0	0
17	FW	(United States) USA	Will Bruin	27	3	16+8	3	0	0	0	0	0+3	0
98	FW	(United States) USA	Samuel Adeniran [TAC]	3	0	1+2	0	0	0	0	0	0	0
Players transferred/loaned out during the season
87	FW	(United States) USA	Alfonso Ocampo-Chavez	0	0	0	0	0	0	0	0	0	0

- Last updated: November 23, 2021
- Source: Team Stats

[TAC] – Defiance player^{[A]}

=== Top scorers ===
Rank	Position	Number	Name	MLS	U.S. Open Cup	Playoffs	Leagues Cup	Total
1	FW	9	(Peru) Raúl Ruidíaz	17	0	0	2	19
2	FW	12	(Colombia) Fredy Montero	7	0	0	1	8
3	MF	7	(United States) Cristian Roldan	6	0	0	1	7
4	MF	20	(France) Nicolas Benezet	3	0	0	1	4
4	DF	94	(Colombia) Jimmy Medranda	4	0	0	0	4
6	MF	6	(Brazil) João Paulo	3	0	0	0	3
6	DF	11	(Australia) Brad Smith	3	0	0	0	3
6	FW	17	(United States) Will Bruin	3	0	0	0	3
9	DF	3	(Ecuador) Xavier Arreaga	2	0	0	0	2
10	MF	10	(Uruguay) Nicolás Lodeiro	0	0	0	1	1
10	DF	16	(El Salvador) Alex Roldan	1	0	0	0	1
10	MF	22	(United States) Kelyn Rowe	1	0	0	0	1
10	MF	23	(Brazil) Léo Chú	1	0	0	0	1
10	DF	27	(United States) Shane O'Neill	1	0	0	0	1
10	DF	28	(Colombia) Yeimar Gómez Andrade	1	0	0	0	1

- Last updated: November 23, 2021
- Source: Team Stats

=== Top assists ===
Rank	Position	Number	Name	MLS	U.S. Open Cup	Playoffs	Leagues Cup	Total
1	MF	6	(Brazil) João Paulo	8	0	0	1	9
2	MF	7	(United States) Cristian Roldan	1	0	0	2	3
2	DF	11	(Australia) Brad Smith	3	0	0	0	3
2	FW	12	(Colombia) Fredy Montero	3	0	0	0	3
2	DF	16	(El Salvador) Alex Roldan	3	0	0	0	3
2	DF	94	(Colombia) Jimmy Medranda	3	0	0	0	3
7	FW	17	(United States) Will Bruin	2	0	0	0	2
8	DF	5	(Cameroon) Nouhou	1	0	0	0	1
8	FW	9	(Peru) Raúl Ruidíaz	1	0	0	0	1
8	MF	84	(United States) Josh Atencio	1	0	0	0	1

- Last updated: August 21, 2021

=== Disciplinary record ===
No.	Pos.	Player	MLS			U.S. Open Cup			MLS Playoffs			Leagues Cup			Total		
No.	Pos.	Player	Yellow card	(yellow card) (yellow-red card)	Red card	Yellow card	(yellow card) (yellow-red card)	Red card	Yellow card	(yellow card) (yellow-red card)	Red card	Yellow card	(yellow card) (yellow-red card)	Red card	Yellow card	(yellow card) (yellow-red card)	Red card
3	DF	(Ecuador) Xavier Arreaga	5	0	0	0	0	0	0	0	0	0	0	0	5	0	0
5	DF	(Cameroon) Nouhou	2	0	0	0	0	0	0	0	0	0	0	0	2	0	0
6	MF	(Brazil) João Paulo	5	0	0	0	0	0	0	0	0	0	0	0	5	0	0
7	MF	(United States) Cristian Roldan	1	0	0	0	0	0	0	0	0	0	0	0	1	0	0
8	MF	(Martinique) Jordy Delem	1	0	0	0	0	0	0	0	0	0	0	0	1	0	0
9	FW	(Peru) Raúl Ruidíaz	4	0	0	0	0	0	0	0	0	0	0	0	4	0	0
10	MF	(Uruguay) Nicolás Lodeiro	0	0	0	0	0	0	0	0	0	1	0	0	1	0	0
11	DF	(Australia) Brad Smith	1	0	0	0	0	0	0	0	0	0	0	0	1	0	0
16	DF	(El Salvador) Alex Roldan	2	0	0	0	0	0	0	0	0	0	0	0	2	0	0
22	MF	(United States) Kelyn Rowe	0	0	0	0	0	0	0	0	0	1	0	0	1	0	0
27	DF	(United States) Shane O'Neill	1	0	0	0	0	0	0	0	0	0	0	0	1	0	0
28	DF	(Colombia) Yeimar Gómez Andrade	4	0	0	0	0	0	0	0	0	0	0	0	4	0	0
45	MF	(United States) Ethan Dobbelaere	1	0	0	0	0	0	0	0	0	0	0	0	1	0	0
75	MF	(United States) Danny Leyva	3	0	0	0	0	0	0	0	0	0	0	0	3	0	0
84	MF	(United States) Josh Atencio	1	0	0	0	0	0	0	0	0	0	0	0	1	0	0
94	DF	(Colombia) Jimmy Medranda	1	0	0	0	0	0	0	0	0	0	0	0	1	0	0
98	FW	(United States) Samuel Adeniran [TAC]	1	0	0	0	0	0	0	0	0	0	0	0	1	0	0
Total			33	0	0	0	0	0	0	0	0	2	0	0	35	0	0

- Last updated: August 21, 2021
- Source: Disciplinary Stats

== Honors and awards ==
=== MLS Team of the Week ===
Week	Player	Opponent	Position	Ref
1	(Peru) Raúl Ruidíaz	Minnesota United FC	FW	
1	(United States) Josh Atencio	Minnesota United FC	Bench	
2	(Australia) Brad Smith	Los Angeles FC	DF	
3	(Peru) Raúl Ruidíaz	LA Galaxy	FW	
3	(Australia) Brad Smith	LA Galaxy	DF	
4	(Peru) Raúl Ruidíaz	Portland Timbers	Bench	
5	(Ecuador) Xavier Arreaga	San Jose Earthquakes, Los Angeles FC	DF	
5	(El Salvador) Alex Roldan	San Jose Earthquakes, Los Angeles FC	DF	
5	(United States) Cristian Roldan	San Jose Earthquakes, Los Angeles FC	MF	
5	(United States) Brian Schmetzer	San Jose Earthquakes, Los Angeles FC	Coach	
6	(Cameroon) Nouhou	Atlanta United FC	Bench	
8	(Colombia) Yeimar Gómez Andrade	LA Galaxy	DF	
9	(United States) Cristian Roldan	Real Salt Lake	MF	
10	(Brazil) João Paulo	Vancouver Whitecaps FC	Bench	
11	(El Salvador) Alex Roldan	Colorado Rapids	Bench	
12	(Brazil) João Paulo	Houston Dynamo	MF	
12	(United States) Kelyn Rowe	Houston Dynamo	Bench	
14	(Peru) Raúl Ruidíaz	Austin FC	FW	
14	(United States) Josh Atencio	Austin FC	DF	
17	(Brazil) João Paulo	FC Dallas	Bench	
19	(Peru) Raúl Ruidíaz	Portland Timbers	FW	
19	(Colombia) Fredy Montero	Portland Timbers	Bench	
20	(Peru) Raúl Ruidíaz	FC Dallas	FW	
21	(Ecuador) Xavier Arreaga	Columbus Crew	DF	
21	(Brazil) João Paulo	Columbus Crew	Bench	
24	(Brazil) João Paulo	Minnesota United FC	MF	
24	(Switzerland) Stefan Frei	Minnesota United FC	Bench	
27	(Brazil) João Paulo	Sporting Kansas City	MF	
28	(United States) Cristian Roldan	San Jose Earthquakes	MF	
28	(Peru) Raúl Ruidíaz	San Jose Earthquakes	FW	
28	(Colombia) Yeimar Gómez Andrade	San Jose Earthquakes	Bench	
29	(United States) Cristian Roldan	Colorado Rapids	MF	
29	(Brazil) João Paulo	Colorado Rapids	MF	
31	(Brazil) Léo Chú	Colorado Rapids	MF	
34	(Switzerland) Stefan Frei	LA Galaxy	Bench	

Italics indicates MLS Player of the Week

=== MLS Goal of the Week ===
Week	Player	Opponent	Ref
1	(Brazil) João Paulo	Minnesota United FC	
5	(United States) Cristian Roldan	San Jose Earthquakes	
14	(Peru) Raúl Ruidíaz	Austin FC	
19	(Colombia) Jimmy Medranda	Portland Timbers	
20	(Peru) Raúl Ruidíaz	FC Dallas	
29	(Brazil) João Paulo	Colorado Rapids	

=== MLS Save of the Year ===
Player	Opponent	Ref
Stefan Frei	Real Salt Lake	

=== MLS Best XI ===
Player	Position	Ref
Raúl Ruidíaz	Forward	
João Paulo	Midfielder	
Yeimar Gómez Andrade	Defender	

== Transfers ==
For transfers in, dates listed are when Sounders FC officially signed the players to the roster. Transactions where only the rights to the players are acquired are not listed. For transfers out, dates listed are when Sounders FC officially removed the players from its roster, not when they signed with another club. If a player later signed with another club, his new club will be noted, but the date listed here remains the one when he was officially removed from Sounders FC roster.

=== In ===
No.	Pos.	Player	Transferred from	Fee/notes	Date	Source
6	MF	(Brazil) João Paulo	(Brazil) Botafogo	Undisclosed	January 21, 2021	
11	MF	(United States) Kelyn Rowe	(United States) New England Revolution	Free Transfer	January 29, 2021	
18	GK	(United States) Spencer Richey	(United States) FC Cincinnati	Free Transfer	February 3, 2021	
12	FW	(Colombia) Fredy Montero	(Canada) Vancouver Whitecaps FC	Free Transfer	March 4, 2021	
21	MF	(United States) Reed Baker-Whiting	(United States) Tacoma Defiance	Signed HGP Deal	May 12, 2021	
26	GK	(Russia) Andrew Thomas	(United States) Stanford University	Off waivers. Seattle acquired the top spot in the waivers process from Chicago Fire FC for $50,000 in General Allocation Money (GAM).	May 21, 2021	
92	DF	(France) Abdoulaye Cissoko	(United States) Tacoma Defiance		May 21, 2021	
20	MF	(France) Nicolas Benezet	(United States) Colorado Rapids	$50,000 in GAM	August 5, 2021	
23	MF	(Brazil) Léo Chú	(Brazil) Grêmio	U22 Initiative signing; $2.5 million transfer fee	August 5, 2021	

=== Draft picks ===
Draft picks are not automatically signed to the team roster. Only those who are signed to a contract will be listed as transfers in. Only trades involving draft picks and executed after the start of 2021 MLS SuperDraft will be listed in the notes.

Date	Player	Number	Position	Previous club	Notes	Ref
January 21, 2021	(United States) T. J. Bush	01	GK	(United States) James Madison University	MLS SuperDraft 3rd Round Pick (#80)	

=== Out ===
No.	Pos.	Player	Transferred to	Fee/notes	Date	Source
99	FW	(United States) Justin Dhillon	(United States) San Antonio FC	Option declined	December 14, 2020	
11	MF	(United States) Miguel Ibarra	(United States) San Diego Loyal SC	Option declined	December 14, 2020	
33	DF	(Trinidad and Tobago) Joevin Jones	(United States) Inter Miami CF	Option declined	December 14, 2020	
18	DF	(Suriname) Kelvin Leerdam	(United States) Inter Miami CF	Out of contract	December 14, 2020	
4	MF	(Sweden) Gustav Svensson	(China) Guangzhou City	Out of contract	December 14, 2020	
29	DF	(Panama) Román Torres	(Costa Rica) Cartagines	Out of contract	December 14, 2020	
6	MF	(Brazil) João Paulo	(Brazil) Botafogo	End of loan	December 14, 2020	
13	FW	(United States) Jordan Morris	(Wales) Swansea City	On loan	January 22, 2021	
11	GK	(United States) Trey Muse	(United States) San Diego Loyal SC	On loan	February 2, 2021	
37	MF	(United States) Shandon Hopeau	(United States) San Antonio FC	On loan	April 15, 2021	
87	FW	(United States) Alfonso Ocampo-Chavez	(Austria) FC Pinzgau Saalfelden	On loan	July 16, 2021	

=== Other transactions ===
- On July 17, 2021, Samuel Adeniran and Obed Vargas of the Tacoma Defiance were signed to short-term agreements under the "extreme hardship" rule due to a lack of available Sounders players.

== Notes ==
A. ^{a} Players who are under contract with Tacoma Defiance.
