= Raúl Ruidíaz =

Peruvian footballer (born 1990)

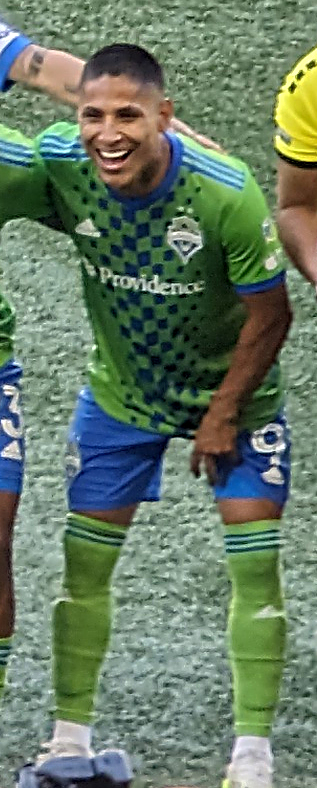
- Ruidíaz with Seattle Sounders FC in 2023

Personal information
- Full name: Raúl Mario Ruidíaz Misitich
- Date of birth: 25 July 1990 (age 36)
- Place of birth: Villa María del Triunfo, Peru
- Height: 1.69 m (5 ft 7 in)
- Position: Striker

Team information
- Current team: Atlético Grau
- Number: 9

Youth career
- 1998–2008: Universitario

Senior career*
Years	Team	Apps	(Gls)
2008–2011	Universitario	66	(13)
2008–2009	→ U América (loan)	11	(3)
2012	Universidad de Chile	15	(8)
2012–2015	Coritiba	18	(2)
2013–2014	→ Universitario (loan)	64	(35)
2015	Melgar	14	(2)
2015–2017	Universitario	22	(22)
2016–2017	→ Morelia (loan)	34	(20)
2017–2018	Morelia	38	(20)
2018–2024	Seattle Sounders FC	139	(72)
2025–	Atlético Grau	40	(11)

International career^{‡}
2011–2023	Peru	54	(4)
Medal record
Men's football
Representing Peru
Copa América
Runner-up	2019 Brazil
Third place	2011 Argentina
- * Club domestic league appearances and goals as of 29 December 2025 ‡ National team caps and goals as of 12 September 2023

Raúl Mario Ruidíaz Misitich (Spanish pronunciation: [raˈul rujˈðiaθ misiˈtitʃ]; born 25 July 1990) is a Peruvian professional footballer who plays as a striker for Liga 1 club Atlético Grau.

His nickname, "The Flea", stems from his small frame and his ability to get past defenders with great ball control. Ruidíaz began his career at Universitario de Deportes in Peru and later played for Chilean Primera División club Universidad de Chile and Monarcas Morelia in Liga MX between stints with Universitario. He joined Seattle Sounders FC in 2018 and became their all-time top goalscorer in Major League Soccer play during his seven seasons with the club.

== Club career ==
=== Universitario ===
Ruidíaz grew up in the Lima neighbourhood of Villa María del Triunfo. He is of maternal Croatian descent. He made his first steps in club football at Primera División club Universitario de Deportes aged eight. In January 2008, the player was promoted to the first adult team and immediately loaned to América Cochahuayco, the club's filial team, directed by the coach Héctor Chumpitaz, a historic football player of the Peruvian national team in the 1982 World Cup. His first professional goal was against Hijos de Acosvinchos. After the arrival of Jorge Gonzáles, he began to play as a striker.

Ruidíaz made his professional debut in the Peruvian First Division on 4 October 2009 against Total Chalaco in the Monumental, at the age of 19. The coach at the time, Juan Reynoso, decided to play him from the start of the match, which finished 2–1 in favor of Universitario. He finished the season by scoring 3 goals in 7 games in the Peruvian 2009 Championship and also won his first National title with Universitario de Deportes. Ruidíaz has often been called pequeño Messi (little Messi) in his home country, mainly because of his ability to charge a player one on one, as well as his unique technical skills. Ruidiaz was listed among the greatest talents of South American football by O Globo Brazilian newspaper in 2010.

=== Universidad de Chile ===
On 20 January 2012, Ruidíaz was appointed as new player of the Primera División club Universidad de Chile. Despite some early success with his new club, Raul's lack of match fitness and the emergence of young talented strikers at the club Ruidíaz fell out of favour with the Universidad de Chile manager towards the end of the season. On 15 July 2012, Ruidíaz and club Universidad de Chile had mutually agreed to release him.

=== Morelia ===
After participating in the Copa América Centenario, Ruidíaz signed for Mexican club Monarcas Morelia on a season-long loan deal for a reported fee of €105,000. He was presented to the media in Morelia on 1 July 2016 and was given the number 9 shirt. Ruidíaz made his Liga MX debut on 15 July 2016 replacing Diego Valdés in a 2–0 away loss to Tijuana. The following week, in Morelia's home opener, Ruidíaz scored his first goal in a 2–2 draw against Querétaro. On 1 August 2016, Ruidíaz scored a hat-trick in a 4–2 away win against Santos Laguna. Ruidíaz ended the season with 11 goals which made him the season's top scorer along with Tijuana's Dayro Moreno.

Before Morelia's Clausura 2017 home opener against Tijuana, Ruidíaz was honored with a commemorative plaque at Estadio Morelos for being the club's first Liga MX scoring champion. Ruidíaz later scored the second goal in Morelia's 2–0 opening match victory over Tijuana. Later that night, it was announced Morelia signed Ruidíaz to a permanent three-year transfer. Later in the season Ruidíaz scored his second hat-trick for Morelia in a 4–0 win over UNAM. In the final game of the season, Ruidíaz scored a crucial game-winning goal in a 2–1 away victory over Monterrey. The goal helped Morelia avoid relegation, helped the team qualify to the liguilla and helped Ruidíaz win his second straight Liga MX scoring title.

=== Seattle Sounders FC ===
On 6 June 2018, it was reported that Ruidíaz would be signing a contract with MLS side Seattle Sounders FC. The signing was made official on 29 June, as the club announced Ruidiaz as a Designated Player. He set club records for being the fastest to score 10 goals in MLS play (in 14 games), and scoring in the most consecutive appearances (8 games).

On 10 November 2019, Ruidíaz scored Seattle's final goal in a 3–1 home win over Toronto FC in the MLS Cup Final.

In the 2022 CONCACAF Champions League Final, he scored two goals in a 3–0 win in the second leg against UNAM, in which his club secured their first title in the competition by winning 5–2 on aggregate. This was the first time (and as of March 2025, still the only time) that an MLS team has won the CONCACAF Champions League.

Ruidíaz became the top goalscorer across all competitions in the team's MLS era on March 23, 2024, surpassing Fredy Montero's 79-goal record with the Sounders.

On 4 December 2024, the Sounders announced that Ruidíaz would not return for an eighth season after his contract was not renewed.

=== Atlético Grau ===
On 3 April 2025, Atlético Grau of the Peruvian Primera División signed Ruidíaz to a one-year contract.

== International career ==
=== 2011: Debut and first Copa América ===
Ruidíaz made his international debut on 7 June 2011 in a 0–0 draw against Japan in Niigata in the Kirin Cup. In the same month, Ruidíaz was called up by coach Sergio Markarián to represent Peru in the Copa América held in Argentina, Ruidíaz was a member of the Peruvian squad that finished 3rd, after a 4–1 victory over Venezuela, Ruidíaz made only one appearance in the tournament in a match against Chile in which Peru lost 1–0.

=== 2016–2018: Second Copa América and first FIFA World Cup ===
Ruidíaz was named as a member of Peru's 23-man squad for the Copa América Centenario in 2016. In Peru's third group match against Brazil on 12 June 2016, Ruidíaz scored a controversial goal, a winner in the 75th minute by guiding the ball into the net with his arm. After a lengthy discussion between the referee and his assistant, the goal was allowed to stand, and Brazil went on to lose 1–0, resulting in their elimination from the tournament. The result sent Peru through to the knockout stage as winners of Group B.

In May 2018, he was named in Peru's provisional 24 man squad for the 2018 World Cup in Russia.

== Career statistics ==
=== Club ===
As of match played 30 November 2024

Appearances and goals by club, season and competition
Club	Season	League			National cup (Note: Includes Copa do Brasil, Copa MX, U.S. Open Cup)		Continental		Other		Total	
Club	Season	Division	Apps	Goals	Apps	Goals	Apps	Goals	Apps	Goals	Apps	Goals
Universitario	2009	Liga 1	9	3	—		0	0	—		9	3
Universitario	2010	Liga 1	35	7	—		2 (Note: Appearances in Copa Libertadores)	0	—		37	7
Universitario	2011	Liga 1	22	3	0	0	6 (Note: Appearances in Copa Sudamericana)	4	—		28	7
Universitario	Total		66	13	0	0	8	4	0	0	74	17
U América FC (loan)	2009	Liga 2			—		—		—			
Universidad de Chile	2012	Chilean Primera División	15	8	—		9	0	—		24	8
Coritiba	2012	Série A	8	0	3	0	—		4 (Note: Appearances in Campeonato Paranaense)	0	15	0
Universitario (loan)	2013	Liga 1	39	21	0	0	—		—		39	21
Universitario (loan)	2014	Liga 1	25	14	10	4	6	1	—		41	19
Universitario (loan)	Total		64	35	10	4	6	1	0	0	80	40
Melgar	2015	Liga 1	14	2	6	3	—		—		20	5
Universitario	2015	Liga 1	13	12	0	0	2	1	—		14	13
Universitario	2016	Liga 1	9	10	0	0	—		—		9	10
Universitario	Total		22	22	0	0	2	1	0	0	24	23
Morelia (loan)	2016–17	Liga MX	34	20	0	0	—		—		34	20
Morelia	2017–18	Liga MX	38	20	1	1	—		—		39	21
Seattle Sounders FC	2018	MLS	14	10	0	0	—		2 (Note: Appearances in MLS Cup playoffs)	3	16	13
Seattle Sounders FC	2019	MLS	22	11	0	0	—		4	4	26	15
Seattle Sounders FC	2020	MLS	17 (Note: Includes three appearances and one goal in MLS is Back Tournament group stage)	12	—		2 (Note: Appearances in CONCACAF Champions League)	0	5 (Note: One appearance in MLS is Back Tournament knockout stage, four appearances and two goals in MLS Cup playoffs)	2	24	14
Seattle Sounders FC	2021	MLS	26	17	—		—		4 (Note: Three appearances and two goals in Leagues Cup, one appearance in MLS Cup playoffs)	2	30	19
Seattle Sounders FC	2022	MLS	18	9	0	0	6	3	—		24	12
Seattle Sounders FC	2023	MLS	18	5	0	0	—		6 (Note: One appearance in FIFA Club World Cup, two appearances in Leagues Cup, three appearances in MLS Cup playoffs)	0	24	5
Seattle Sounders FC	2024	MLS	24	8	2	0	—		6 (Note: Two appearances in Leagues Cup, four appearances in MLS Cup playoffs)	0	32	8
Seattle Sounders FC	Total		139	72	2	0	8	3	27	11	176	86
Career total			399	192	22	8	33	9	31	11	486	220

=== International ===
As of match played 12 September 2023

Appearances and goals by national team and year
National team	Year	Apps	Goals
Peru	2011	3	0
Peru	2012	3	0
Peru	2013	1	0
Peru	2014	2	0
Peru	2015	1	0
Peru	2016	12	3
Peru	2017	4	0
Peru	2018	10	1
Peru	2019	7	0
Peru	2020	3	0
Peru	2021	4	0
Peru	2022	2	0
Peru	2023	2	0
Total		54	4

As of match played 27 March 2018
Scores and results list Peru's goal tally first, score column indicates score after each Ruidíaz goal.

List of international goals scored by Raúl Ruidíaz
No.	Date	Venue	Opponent	Score	Result	Competition
1	24 March 2016	Estadio Nacional, Lima, Peru	Venezuela	2–2	2–2	2018 FIFA World Cup qualification
2	28 May 2016	Robert F. Kennedy Memorial Stadium, Washington D.C., United States	El Salvador	1–0	3–1	Friendly
3	12 June 2016	Gillette Stadium, Foxborough, United States	Brazil	1–0	1–0	Copa América Centenario
4	27 March 2018	Red Bull Arena, Harrison, United States	Iceland	2–1	3–1	Friendly

== Honours ==
Universitario de Deportes

- Torneo Descentralizado: 2009, 2013

Universidad de Chile

- Primera División de Chile: 2012 Apertura

Seattle Sounders FC

- MLS Cup: 2019
- CONCACAF Champions League: 2022

Peru

- Copa América runner-up: 2019; third place: 2011

Individual

- Peruvian Primera División top scorer: 2013
- Liga MX Golden Boot: Apertura 2016, Clausura 2017
- Liga MX Best XI: Apertura 2016, Clausura 2017
- Liga MX Best Forward: 2016–17
- Liga MX Balón de Oro: 2016–17
- MLS Cup Playoffs top scorer: 2019
- MLS Best XI: 2020, 2021
- MLS All-Star: 2021, 2022
- CONCACAF Champions League Best XI: 2022

== See also ==
- List of Seattle Sounders FC players
