= 2026 Seattle Sounders FC season =

American soccer team season

Seattle Sounders FC
2026 season
- General manager: Craig Waibel
- Head coach: Brian Schmetzer
- Stadium: Lumen Field
- Major League Soccer: Conference: 8th Overall: 16th
- MLS Cup playoffs: Wild card round
- CONCACAF Champions Cup: Quarterfinals
- Leagues Cup: League phase
- Highest home attendance: League: 40,171 vs. LAFC (Nov. 7)
- Lowest home attendance: League: 28,587 vs. Kansas City (Oct. 1)
- Average home league attendance: 31,936
- Biggest win: League: 4–1 vs. St. Louis (Apr. 18); 3–0 at New England (Oct. 10)
- Biggest defeat: League: 1–5 vs. Portland (Jul. 16); 1–5 at Vancouver (Nov. 1)
Home colors	Away colors	Third colors

The 2026 season is the 18th season for Seattle Sounders FC in Major League Soccer (MLS), the top flight of professional club soccer in the United States. It is the 43rd season for a professional team bearing the Sounders name, which had originated in 1974 with the first incarnation of the franchise. The team remained under the management of Brian Schmetzer in his tenth full MLS season as head coach of the Sounders.

The Sounders played 34 matches in the MLS regular season and also qualified for the 2026 CONCACAF Champions Cup as winners of the 2025 Leagues Cup. The team also played in the 2026 edition of the Leagues Cup. During the 2025 season, Seattle finished fifth in the Western Conference standings and qualified for the MLS Cup playoffs, where they were eliminated in the first round by Minnesota United FC. The Sounders also played in the 2025 FIFA Club World Cup and the 2025 CONCACAF Champions Cup.

The team drew an average attendance of 31,936 spectators to regular season matches at Lumen Field. The 2026 season was the last full season under the spring–autumn format used by MLS since it began play in 1996. The league plans to use a autumn–spring schedule beginning in late 2027 with a long winter break.

== Summary ==
=== Preseason ===
The Sounders opened their 2026 preseason training camp on January 12 and retained most of their roster from the 2025 season. Among the new signings are midfielders Nikola Petković, who was loaned from Charlotte FC, and two players from reserve team Tacoma Defiance—forward Yu Tsukanome and midfielder Sebastian Gomez. Homegrown midfielder Obed Vargas left the team during preseason to sign with Atlético Madrid of La Liga.

On January 18, the team traveled to Quinta do Lago in Portugal for one week of training and one friendly match at Estádio Algarve. They lost 2–0 to Brøndby IF and traveled on January 26 to the Marbella Football Center in Spain for the remainder of their overseas preseason. The Sounders won their first friendly against IF Brommapojkarna and played two full-length matches on February 5—defeating Hammarby IF and losing to FC Metalist 1925 Kharkiv. The Sounders returned to Seattle in early February and won two friendlies against Louisville City FC at their home training facility.

=== Regular season ===
Following their season opener against the Colorado Rapids in late February, the Sounders played five regular season matches on the road while Lumen Field underwent preparations for the 2026 FIFA World Cup. The stadium's normal FieldTurf surface was covered with a temporary grass field that is planned to be used during the World Cup and other events until July. The team returned to Lumen Field on April 15 for a CONCACAF Champions Cup match against Tigres UANL, which was played on the grass surface. The Sounders maintained a home unbeaten streak through all competitions that had begun after the 2025 FIFA Club World Cup and continued into the 2026 season. It ended after 22 matches with a 2–0 loss to the LA Galaxy on May 16—the final home match before the World Cup break.

The Sounders had 18 days of rest before resuming training to prepare for the second half of the season. The team's training facility was used by the Belgium national team as their base camp during the World Cup. The Sounders lost 2–1 to Belgium in a 60-minute training scrimmage on June 17; Sounders players also appeared at various watch parties and events during the tournament. The MLS season resumed on July 16 with a rivalry match against Portland Timbers at Lumen Field, where the Sounders lost 5–1 with several key players missing due to injuries. The team ended their eight-match losing streak in league matches with a 1–1 draw against FC Cincinnati on August 22. The lineup had shifted several times due to additional player injuries and a schedule that included multiple midweek matches.

In the first round of the Leagues Cup, the Sounders traveled to play Toluca FC in the tournament's first match hosted in Mexico. They lost 3–0 despite Stefan Frei making 15 saves in his return to the team. The team returned to Seattle to host Querétaro FC and won 3–0 with a modified lineup; Sebastian Gomez made his first start and scored his first goal for the Sounders. The Sounders were eliminated from the Leagues Cup with a 2–1 loss to Chivas de Guadalajara and finished with three points in the tournament table. On August 25, the team traded $6 million to Sporting Kansas City to sign Serbian striker Dejan Joveljić to a four-year Designated Player contract. To comply with roster rules, Albert Rusnák's contract was modified to fall below the Designated Player threshold and open a slot. It was the first Sounders signing during the summer transfer window for an outside player since Léo Chú was acquired in 2021.

The Sounders broke their winless streak on September 23 by defeating Real Salt Lake, their first victory in four months. The team followed with three consecutive victories and entered playoff contention, but then failed to win their next five matches and entered Decision Day in tenth place. In their final regular season match, played at home, the Sounders defeated Los Angeles FC 2–0 and qualified for the playoffs. The team finished their season in eight place in the Western Conference with a record of 12 wins, 12 losses, and 10 draws.

== Non-competitive matches ==
=== Preseason ===
The preseason schedule was released by Seattle Sounders FC on January 22, 2026.

January 23	Seattle Sounders FC	0–2	Brøndby IF	Faro–Loulé, Portugal
5:00 am PST		Report	Tahirović 29'; Divković 90+1' (pen.)	Stadium: Estádio Algarve

January 31	Seattle Sounders FC	3–0	IF Brommapojkarna	Marbella, Spain
5:00 am PST	Kossa-Rienzi 31'; Ferreira 85', 97'	Report		Stadium: Marbella Football Center
Note: Match was played over three periods, each 45 minutes long

February 5	Seattle Sounders FC	3–1	Hammarby IF	Marbella, Spain
4:00 am PST	De Rosario 8', 65'; Ferreira 63'	Report	Vasić 22'; Winther (yellow card) 41'	Stadium: Marbella Football Center

February 5	Seattle Sounders FC	0–3	FC Metalist 1925 Kharkiv	Marbella, Spain
7:00 am PST		Report	Kalitvintsev 12'; Kalyuzhnyi 24'; Mba 54'	Stadium: Marbella Football Center

February 15	Seattle Sounders FC	3–1	Louisville City FC	Renton, Washington
11:30 am PST	Rusnák 30' (pen.); De Rosario 83', 90'	Report	Brunell 45+1' (o.g.)	Stadium: Providence Swedish Performance Center & Clubhouse

February 15	Seattle Sounders FC	5–0	Louisville City FC	Renton, Washington
1:00 pm PST	Gomez; Rothrock 32'; Minoungou 62'; Petković 80'; Kingston 81'	Report		Stadium: Providence Swedish Performance Center & Clubhouse

== Competitions ==
=== Major League Soccer ===
==== League tables ====
MLS Western Conference table (2026)
Pos	Team	Pld	W	L	T	GF	GA	GD	Pts	Qualification
6	Los Angeles FC	34	12	11	11	52	40	+12	47	Qualification for round one
7	Portland Timbers	34	13	14	7	62	61	+1	46	Qualification for round one
8	Seattle Sounders FC	34	12	12	10	44	46	−2	46	Qualification for the wild card round
9	Real Salt Lake	34	13	15	6	53	52	+1	45	Qualification for the wild card round
10	Minnesota United FC	34	11	12	11	56	58	−2	44	

Source: MLS
Rules for classification: 1) points; 2) total wins; 3) total goal differential; 4) total goals scored; 5) fewer disciplinary points; 6) away goal differential; 7) away goals scored; 8) home goals differential; 9) home goals scored; 10) coin toss (2 clubs tied) or drawing of lots (≥3 clubs tied)

Overall MLS standings table
Pos	Team	Pld	W	L	T	GF	GA	GD	Pts
14	Portland Timbers	34	13	14	7	62	61	+1	46
15	Orlando City SC	34	13	14	7	63	78	−15	46
16	Seattle Sounders FC	34	12	12	10	44	46	−2	46
17	FC Cincinnati	34	12	12	10	67	75	−8	46
18	Real Salt Lake	34	13	15	6	53	52	+1	45

Source: MLS
Rules for classification: 1) points; 2) total wins; 3) total goal differential; 4) total goals scored; 5) fewer disciplinary points; 6) away goal differential; 7) away goals scored; 8) home goals differential; 9) home goals scored; 10) coin toss (2 clubs tied) or drawing of lots (≥3 clubs tied)

==== Regular season ====
The MLS regular season schedule was released on November 20, 2025. The Sounders played 34 matches—17 at home and 17 away—primarily against the 14 other teams in the Western Conference; the team played only six opponents from the Eastern Conference. The regular season included a six-week break for the 2026 FIFA World Cup in May and June. The Sounders had five consecutive away matches from February to April while Lumen Field underwent preparations to host the World Cup, including the installation of a grass pitch to temporarily replace the artificial turf.

February 22 1	Seattle Sounders FC	2−0	Colorado Rapids	Seattle, Washington
6:00 pm PST	Rusnák 15'; A. Roldán (yellow card) 61'; Rothrock 62'	Report	R. Navarro (yellow card) 23'; Cobb (yellow card) 30'; Sealy (yellow card) 40'; Cannon (yellow card) 42'	Stadium: Lumen Field; Attendance: 31,606; Referee: Malik Badawi

February 28 2	Real Salt Lake	2–1	Seattle Sounders FC	Sandy, Utah
4:30 pm PST	Quinton (yellow card) 6'; Hezarkhani 23'; Piol 47'; Gozo (yellow card) 60'; Marczuk (yellow card) 90+2'	Report	C. Roldan 62'	Stadium: America First Field; Attendance: 20,660; Referee: Tori Penso

March 7 3	St. Louis City SC	0–1	Seattle Sounders FC	St. Louis, Missouri
5:30 pm PST	Durkin (yellow card) 33'	Report	A. Roldán (yellow card) 44'; Kossa-Rienzi 47'; Dotson (yellow card) 74'; Arriola (yellow card) 81'	Stadium: Energizer Park; Attendance: 22,423; Referee: Tim Ford

March 15 4 (HC)	San Jose Earthquakes	0–1	Seattle Sounders FC	San Jose, California
4:00 pm PDT	Tsakiris (yellow card) 86'	Report	Nouhou (yellow card) 10'; Rothrock 20'; Petković (yellow card) 46'; Musovski (yellow card) 56'; Kingston (yellow card) 59'	Stadium: PayPal Park; Attendance: 18,251; Referee: Victor Rivas

March 22 5	Minnesota United FC	0−0	Seattle Sounders FC	Saint Paul, Minnesota
11:30 am PDT	Díaz (yellow card) 47'	Report	Petković (yellow card) 38'; Lopez (yellow card) 38'; Ragen (yellow card) 67'	Stadium: Allianz Field; Attendance: 19,637; Referee: Jon Freemon

April 4 6	Houston Dynamo FC	0–1	Seattle Sounders FC	Houston, Texas
5:30 pm PDT	Andrade (yellow card) 38'	Report	Rothrock (yellow card) 54', (goal) 83'; Ragen (yellow card) 72'	Stadium: Shell Energy Stadium; Attendance: 17,253; Referee: Ismail Elfath
Note: The kickoff was delayed by 30 minutes due to inclement weather in the Houston area.

April 18 7	Seattle Sounders FC	4−1	St. Louis City SC	Seattle, Washington
6:30 pm PDT	C. Roldan 22', 37'; Rusnák 49' (pen.); De Rosario 86'	Report	Löwen 90+2'	Stadium: Lumen Field; Attendance: 30,596; Referee: Chris Penso

April 25 8	Seattle Sounders FC	2–1	FC Dallas	Seattle, Washington
7:30 pm PDT	Ferreira 15'; Morris 30'; Kingston (yellow card) 82'	Report	Simmonds (yellow card) 27'; Norris 40', (yellow card) 89'; Delgado (yellow card) 45+3'; Abubakar (yellow card) 52'	Stadium: Lumen Field; Attendance: 31,785; Referee: Tori Penso

May 2 9	Sporting Kansas City	1–1	Seattle Sounders FC	Kansas City, Kansas
11:30 am PDT	Joveljić 16'	Report	Rothrock 2'; Ragen (yellow card) 31'; Dotson (yellow card) 90'	Stadium: Sporting Park; Attendance: 16,378; Referee: Sergii Demianchuk

May 9 10	Seattle Sounders FC	1–1	San Diego FC	Seattle, Washington
7:30 pm PDT	Ferreira (yellow card) 51'; Brunell (yellow card) 56'; C. Roldan (yellow card) 57'; Musovski 80'	Report	Ingvartsen 18'; Mighten (yellow card) 75'; Verhoeven (yellow card) 78'	Stadium: Lumen Field; Attendance: 31,528; Referee: Armando Villarreal

May 13 11 (HC)	Seattle Sounders FC	3–2	San Jose Earthquakes	Seattle, Washington
6:30 pm PDT	Rusnák 43' (pen.); Ferreira 55'; De Rosario 89'	Report	Fernandez 2'; Roberts (yellow card) 45+2'; Judd (yellow card) 58', (goal) 69'	Stadium: Lumen Field; Attendance: 28,726; Referee: Filip Dujic

May 16 12	Seattle Sounders FC	0–2	LA Galaxy	Seattle, Washington
6:00 pm PDT	Kingston (yellow card) 44'	Report	Haak (yellow card) 12'; Pec 23'; Yamane (yellow card) 45+4'; Marcinkowski (yellow card) 89'; Cerrillo (yellow card) 89'; Nascimento 90+2'	Stadium: Lumen Field; Attendance: 32,659; Referee: Joe Dickerson

May 24 13	Los Angeles FC	1–0	Seattle Sounders FC	Los Angeles, California
6:00 pm PDT	Tillman 86'	Report		Stadium: BMO Stadium; Attendance: 22,146; Referee: Ramy Touchan

July 16 14 (CC)	Seattle Sounders FC	1–5	Portland Timbers	Seattle, Washington
7:30 pm PDT	Ragen (yellow card) 41'; Rothrock (yellow card) 49'; Dotson 87'	Report	Kelsy 19', 63'; Miller 56'; Bassett 60'; Aravena 90+8'	Stadium: Lumen Field; Attendance: 35,383; Referee: Rosendo Mendoza

July 22 15	Austin FC	3–1	Seattle Sounders FC	Austin, Texas
5:30 pm PDT	Ilie 12'; Šabović (yellow card) 60'; Uzuni 86', (yellow card) 87'; Ramírez 90+1'	Report	Rothrock 26'; Ragen (yellow card) 59' (yellow-red card) 90+4'	Stadium: Q2 Stadium; Attendance: 20,738; Referee: Ricardo Montero

July 25 16	Philadelphia Union	1–0	Seattle Sounders FC	Chester, Pennsylvania
4:30 pm PDT	Iloski 31'	Report	Dotson (yellow card) 12'	Stadium: Subaru Park; Attendance: 18,520; Referee: Tim Ford

August 1 17 (CC)	Portland Timbers	2–1	Seattle Sounders FC	Portland, Oregon
7:30 pm PDT	Miller (yellow card) 30'; Kelsy 41', (yellow card) 45+5'; Bye 82'		Kingston (yellow card) 25'; Kossa-Rienzi 27'; Gomez (yellow card) 71'	Stadium: Providence Park; Attendance: 24,686; Referee: Joe Dickerson

August 16 18 (CC)	Seattle Sounders FC	0–2	Vancouver Whitecaps FC	Seattle, Washington
6:00 pm PDT	Ragen (yellow card) 57'; Nouhou (yellow card) 76'; Rothrock (yellow card) 86'	Report	Elloumi 77'; Müller 82'	Stadium: Lumen Field; Attendance: 30,026; Referee: Armando Villarreal

August 19 19	Seattle Sounders FC	1–2	Austin FC	Seattle, Washington
6:30 pm PDT	Kossa-Rienzi (yellow card) 48'; Hawkins 90'	Report	F. Torres 66'; Biro 87'	Stadium: Lumen Field; Attendance: 28,836; Referee: Allen Chapman

August 22 20	FC Cincinnati	1–1	Seattle Sounders FC	Cincinnati, Ohio
4:30 pm PDT	Evander 24'; Ramírez (yellow card) 64'	Report	Sailor (yellow card) 38'; Kingston (yellow card) 75'; Kossa-Rienzi 83'	Stadium: TQL Stadium; Attendance: 25,513; Referee: Drew Fischer

August 29 21	Seattle Sounders FC	2–2	Chicago Fire FC	Seattle, Washington
1:30 pm PDT	Joveljić 12', 48'; Brunell (yellow card) 51'	Report	Haile-Selassie 38'; Lewandowski 82'	Stadium: Lumen Field; Attendance: 38,287; Referee: Ismail Elfath

September 5 22	Seattle Sounders FC	0–0	New York Red Bulls	Seattle, Washington
5:30 pm PDT	Rothrock (yellow card) 81'	Report	Donkor (yellow card) 45+3'; Che (yellow card) 50'; Bazán (yellow card) 63'	Stadium: Lumen Field; Attendance: 31,691; Referee: Ricardo Fierro

September 12 23	LA Galaxy	1–1	Seattle Sounders FC	Carson, California
7:30 pm PDT	Reus 44' (pen.)	Report	Arriola 81'; Kingston (yellow card) 90+5'; Dotson (yellow card) 90+8'	Stadium: Dignity Health Sports Park; Attendance: 20,489; Referee: Marcos de Oliveira

September 19 24	Colorado Rapids	3–3	Seattle Sounders FC	Commerce City, Colorado
6:30 pm PDT	Whittaker 28', 76'; Phillip 55', (yellow card) 69'; Yapi (yellow card) 79'	Report	C. Roldan 49'; Joveljić 79'; Clark 90+3'	Stadium: Dick's Sporting Goods Park; Attendance: 17,092; Referee: Elijio Arreguin

September 23 25	Seattle Sounders FC	2–0	Real Salt Lake	Seattle, Washington
6:30 pm PDT	Kossa-Rienzi (yellow card) 10'; Arriola (yellow card) 41'; Musovski 48'; Brunell (yellow card) 55'; Rusnák 73'	Report	Henry (yellow card) 57'; Yedlin (yellow card) 87'	Stadium: Lumen Field; Attendance: 28,649; Referee: Joe Dickerson
Note: Rescheduled from April 12 due to Seattle's involvement in CONCACAF Champions Cup.

September 26 26	Seattle Sounders FC	3–1	Minnesota United FC	Seattle, Washington
5:30 pm PDT	Morris 16'; Dotson 35', (yellow card) 71'; Arriola 83'; Hawkins (yellow card) 86'	Report	Díaz (yellow card) 28'; Markanich 57'; Gene (yellow card) 58'	Stadium: Lumen Field; Attendance: 32,331; Referee: Nabil Bensalah

October 1 27	Seattle Sounders FC	2–1	Sporting Kansas City	Seattle, Washington
6:30 pm PDT	Gomez 51'; Nouhou (yellow card) 61'; C. Roldan 90'	Report	André Luiz 44'; Bartlett (yellow card) 90+1'	Stadium: Lumen Field; Attendance: 28,587; Referee: Jair Marrufo
Note: Originally scheduled for September 9 and moved due to a conflict with a Seattle Seahawks game.

October 10 28	New England Revolution	0–3	Seattle Sounders FC	Foxborough, Massachusetts
4:30 pm PDT	Sands (yellow card) 24'	Report	Dotson 15', (yellow card) 56'; C. Roldan (yellow card) 19'; Joveljić 74'; Arriola 81'	Stadium: Gillette Stadium; Attendance: 20,467; Referee: Tori Penso

October 14 29	FC Dallas	1–0	Seattle Sounders FC	Frisco, Texas
5:30 pm PDT	Kaick 63'; Delgado (yellow card) 81'; Daniel (yellow card) 90+8'	Report		Stadium: Toyota Stadium; Attendance: 10,925; Referee: Jon Freemon

October 17 30	Seattle Sounders FC	1–1	CF Montréal	Seattle, Washington
7:30 pm PDT	Dotson (yellow card) 14'; Gomez 66'	Report	Synchuk 13'; Alexis (yellow card) 33'; Loturi (yellow card) 52'	Stadium: Lumen Field; Attendance: 33,007; Referee: Fotis Bazakos

October 24 31	San Diego FC	2–2	Seattle Sounders FC	San Diego, California
7:30 pm PDT	Dreyer 60'; Bakambu 90+6' (pen.)	Report	Joveljić 50', (yellow card) 53'; Gomez 55'; A. Roldán (yellow card) 59'	Stadium: Snapdragon Stadium; Attendance: 21,954; Referee: Allen Chapman

October 28 32	Seattle Sounders FC	0–1	Houston Dynamo FC	Seattle, Washington
7:30 pm PDT	Kingston (yellow card) 65'	Report	Halter 26'; Resch (yellow card) 88'	Stadium: Lumen Field; Attendance: 29,036; Referee: Lorenzo Hernandez

November 1 33 (CC)	Vancouver Whitecaps FC	5–1	Seattle Sounders FC	Vancouver, British Columbia
1:30 pm PST	White 1', 53'; Gauld 9'; Laborda 43'; Caicedo (yellow card) 45+2'; Ćetković 79'	Report	Ferreira (yellow card) 45+3'; Morris 62'	Stadium: BC Place; Attendance: 32,111; Referee: Alexis Da Silva

November 7 34	Seattle Sounders FC	2–1	Los Angeles FC	Seattle, Washington
4:00 pm PST	Rusnák 2'; Gomez 31'; Ragen (yellow card) 76'; Kossa-Rienzi (yellow card) 90'; Kingston (yellow card) 90+3'	Report	Palencia (yellow card) 73'; Segura 81'	Stadium: Lumen Field; Attendance: 40,171; Referee: Filip Dujic

=== MLS Cup Playoffs ===
==== Wild card round ====
November 19 Wild card	Seattle Sounders FC	1–1 (2–4 p)	Real Salt Lake	Seattle, Washington
7:00 pm PST	Rusnák 36'; Kim Kee-hee (yellow card) 45+2'; C. Roldan (yellow card) 76'	Report	Marczuk (yellow card) 34'; Guilavogui (yellow card) 41', (goal) 63'	Stadium: Lumen Field; Attendance: 29,628; Referee: Jon Freemon
	Penalties
	Joveljić (penalty missed); Rusnák (penalty missed); Rothrock (penalty scored); Brunell (penalty scored)		(penalty scored) Solans; (penalty scored) Engel; (penalty scored) Hezarkhani; (penalty scored) Quinton

=== CONCACAF Champions Cup ===
The Sounders played in the CONCACAF Champions Cup, the regional club championship for North America, Central America, and the Caribbean, for the ninth season since entering MLS. The team qualified for the tournament as winners of the 2025 Leagues Cup and were granted a bye to the round of 16. Due to preparations for the 2026 FIFA World Cup at Lumen Field, the Sounders hosted their round of 16 match at One Spokane Stadium in Spokane, Washington.

==== Round of 16 ====
March 12 First leg	Vancouver Whitecaps FC (Canada)	0–3	(United States) Seattle Sounders FC	Vancouver, British Columbia
7:00 pm PDT		Report	Arriola 45', 58'; Rothrock 70'	Stadium: BC Place; Attendance: 12,446; Referee: César Ramos (Mexico)

March 18 Second leg	Seattle Sounders FC (United States)	2–1 (5–1 agg.)	(Canada) Vancouver Whitecaps FC	Spokane, Washington
8:00 pm PDT	Brunell (yellow card) 45+2'; Musovski 79'; Rothrock 83'; Frei (yellow card) 89'	Report	Laborda (yellow card) 4'; Jackson (yellow card) 15'; Badwal 24'; Priso (yellow card) 77'; Berhalter (yellow card) 81'	Stadium: One Spokane Stadium; Attendance: 5,126; Referee: Oshane Nation (Jamaica)

==== Quarterfinals ====
April 8 First leg	Tigres UANL (Mexico)	2–0	(United States) Seattle Sounders FC	San Nicolás de los Garza, Nuevo León
6:00 pm PDT	Herrera (yellow card) 21', (goal) 51'; Aguirre (yellow card) 57'; Gorriarán (yellow card) 58'; Ragen 76' (o.g.)	Report	Nouhou (yellow card) 45+2'; C. Roldan (yellow card) 58'; Kingston (yellow card) 90+1'	Stadium: Estadio Universitario; Attendance: 37,641; Referee: Juan Gabriel Calderón (Costa Rica)

April 15 Second leg	Seattle Sounders FC (United States)	3–1 (3–3 (a) agg.)	(Mexico) Tigres UANL	Seattle, Washington
8:30 pm PDT	Rusnák 11', 82'; Musovski 48', (yellow card) 76'	Report	Lainez (yellow card) 27'; Joaquim 31'; Garza (yellow card) 90+3'; Sánchez (yellow card) 90+6'	Stadium: Lumen Field; Attendance: 20,036; Referee: Ismael Cornejo (El Salvador)

=== Leagues Cup ===
The Sounders were one of 18 MLS teams that qualified for the 2026 Leagues Cup based on their performance during the 2025 regular season. The tournament began in early August and concluded in late September with the same format as the 2025 Leagues Cup: three matches in the first phase against teams from Liga MX and a knockout round for the top four teams from each league. The Sounders opened their Leagues Cup run with the competition's first match to be played in Mexico.

==== League phase ====
Pos	Team	Pld	W	PW	PL	L	GF	GA	GD	Pts
14	Inter Miami CF	3	1	0	0	2	7	7	0	3
15	New York City FC	3	1	0	0	2	4	4	0	3
16	Seattle Sounders FC	3	1	0	0	2	4	5	−1	3
17	Philadelphia Union	3	1	0	0	2	3	4	−1	3
18	Vancouver Whitecaps FC	3	0	0	1	2	2	5	−3	1

Source: Leagues Cup

August 5 1	Toluca (Mexico)	3–0	(United States) Seattle Sounders FC	Toluca, Mexico
7:00 pm PDT	Gallardo 4'; Helinho 64'; Viñas 90+3'	Report		Stadium: Nemesio Diez Stadium; Attendance: 23,467; Referee: Iván Barton (El Salvador)

August 9 2	Seattle Sounders FC (United States)	3–0	(Mexico) Querétaro	Seattle, Washington
2:00 pm PDT	Gomez 4'; Musovski 41'; Anchor (yellow card) 44'; Rusnák 68'	Report	Dueñas (yellow card) 45'; Homenchenko (yellow card) 60'	Stadium: Lumen Field; Attendance: 28,306; Referee: Luis Enrique Santander (Mexico)

August 12 3	Seattle Sounders FC (United States)	1–2	(Mexico) Guadalajara	Seattle, Washington
7:30 pm PDT	Sandnes 13'	Report	Rey (yellow card) 45', (goal) 61'; Sandoval 72'	Stadium: Lumen Field; Attendance: 22,031; Referee: Marco Ortíz (Mexico)

== Players ==
For the 2026 season, the Sounders are permitted a maximum of 30 signed players on the first team, of which 20 players are part of the senior roster and 10 positions are designated for supplemental and reserve players. Additional homegrown players are eligible to be signed to off-roster slots and are able to appear in MLS matches through short-term agreements. The senior players count towards a base salary cap of $6.4 million with exceptions for certain categories, including up to three Designated Players, who counted for a set amount in the cap. The Sounders chose the Designated Player model for roster construction and have two unused under-22 initiative slots.

The Sounders had $2 million in available general allocation money after the summer transfer window that could be used for trades or contract modifications.

=== Roster ===
As of September 15, 2026

Note: Flags indicate national team as defined under FIFA eligibility rules. Players may hold more than one non-FIFA nationality. Squad includes all players who had first team contracts or appearances during the 2026 season across all competitions. Ages listed for each player is calculated from February 21, 2026, the first matchday of the MLS regular season.

Seattle Sounders FC first team roster
No.	Name	Nationality	Position	Age	Signed	Contract ends	Previous club	Notes
4	Ryan Sailor	United States	DF	27	2026	2026	Inter Miami CF (USA)	
5	Nouhou Tolo	Cameroon	DF	28	2017	2029	Seattle Sounders FC 2 (USA)	
7	Cristian Roldan (c)	United States	MF	30	2015	2027	Washington Huskies (USA)	
9	Caden Clark	United States	MF	22	2026	2026	D.C. United (USA)	U-22
9	Dejan Joveljić	Serbia	FW	26	2026	2030	Sporting Kansas City (USA)	DP
10	Pedro de la Vega	Argentina	MF	25	2024	2027	Lanús (ARG)	DP
11	Albert Rusnák	Slovakia	MF	31	2022	2029	Real Salt Lake (USA)	DP (until Aug. 25)
13	Jordan Morris	United States	FW	31	2016	2027	Stanford Cardinal (USA)	DP; HGP
14	Paul Rothrock	United States	MF	27	2023	2029	Tacoma Defiance (USA)	
16	Alex Roldán	El Salvador	DF	29	2018	2029	Seattle Redhawks (USA)	
17	Paul Arriola	United States	MF	31	2025	2027	FC Dallas (USA)	
19	Danny Musovski	United States	FW	30	2024	2028	Real Salt Lake (USA)	
20	Kim Kee-hee	South Korea	DF	36	2025	2026	Ulsan Hyundai FC (KOR)	International
24	Stefan Frei	Switzerland	GK	39	2014	2027	Toronto FC (CAN)	
25	Jackson Ragen	United States	DF	27	2022	2027	Tacoma Defiance (USA)	
26	Andrew Thomas	Russia	GK	27	2021	2027	Stanford Cardinal (USA)	
27 (Note: Ferreira's number was changed from 9 to 27 on August 25, 2026.)	Jesús Ferreira	United States	FW	25	2025	2027	FC Dallas (USA)	
28	Yeimar Gómez Andrade	Colombia	DF	33	2020	2026	Unión de Santa Fe (ARG)	
30	Edson Carli	United States	FW	18	2026	2026	Tacoma Defiance (USA)	Short-term agreement
31	Hassani Dotson	United States	MF	28	2026	2028	Minnesota United FC (USA)	
32	Xavi Gnaulati	United States	MF	21	2026	2026	Tacoma Defiance (USA)	Short-term agreement
33	Cody Baker	United States	DF	22	2025	2026	Tacoma Defiance (USA)	HGP; loaned out
35	Antino Lopez	United States	DF	23	2026	2026	Tacoma Defiance (USA)	
36	Yu Tsukanome	Japan	FW	25	2026	2026	Tacoma Defiance (USA)	International; loaned out
37	Snyder Brunell	United States	MF	18	2025	2028	Tacoma Defiance (USA)	HGP
39	Stuart Hawkins	United States	DF	19	2023	2026	Tacoma Defiance (USA)	HGP
40	Mark O'Neill	United States	DF	23	2026	2026	Tacoma Defiance (USA)	Short-term agreement
42	Rafael Jauregui	United States	MF	21	2026	2026	Tacoma Defiance (USA)	Short-term agreement
44	Nikola Petković	Serbia	MF	22	2026	2026	Charlotte FC (USA)	U-22; International; on loan
45	Peter Kingston	United States	MF	24	2026	2026	Tacoma Defiance (USA)	
50	Max Anchor	Canada	GK	21	2026	2026	Vancouver Whitecaps FC (CAN)	
53	Gallatin Sandnes	United States	DF	17	2026	2026	Tacoma Defiance (USA)	Short-term agreement
84	Charlie Gaffney	United States	MF	22	2026	2026	Tacoma Defiance (USA)	Short-term agreement
85	Kalani Kossa-Rienzi	United States	MF	23	2025	2030	Tacoma Defiance (USA)	
90	Sebastian Gomez	United States	MF	19	2026	2029	Tacoma Defiance (USA)	HGP
95	Osaze De Rosario	Guyana	FW	24	2025	2029	Tacoma Defiance (USA)	Loaned out

== Coaching staff ==
As of January 2026

Technical staff
Head coach	Brian Schmetzer (USA)
Assistant coach	Preki (USA)
Director of goalkeeping	Tom Dutra (USA)
Assistant coach	Freddy Juarez (USA)
Assistant coach	Ricardo Clark (USA)

== Transfers ==
The MLS season has two normal transfer windows during which teams can register new players from outside of the league and those who required an International Transfer Certificate. The primary window is open from January 26 to March 26; a secondary window is scheduled from July 13 to September 2. Teams are required to have their rosters compliant with league rules by February 20 and will be unable to make changes beyond the roster freeze on October 9. Between the transfer windows, teams are allowed to sign free agents or other U.S.-based players, including those traded between MLS teams for other players, general allocation money, or various league slots.

For transfers in, dates listed are when Seattle Sounders FC officially signed the player to the roster. Transactions where only the rights to the players are acquired are not listed. For transfers out, dates listed are when Seattle Sounders FC officially removed the players from its roster, not when they signed with another club. If a player later signed with another club, his new club will be noted, but the date listed here remains the one when he was officially removed from the Seattle Sounders FC roster.

=== In ===
Incoming transfers for Seattle Sounders FC
Player	No.	Pos.	Previous team	Notes	Date
Hassani Dotson (USA)	31	MF	Minnesota United FC (USA)	Free agent signed through the 2027–28 season with club options	December 16, 2025
Max Anchor (CAN)	50	GK	Vancouver Whitecaps FC (CAN)	Claimed off end-of-year waivers and signed to one-year contract with club options	December 17, 2025
Ryan Sailor (USA)	4	DF	Inter Miami CF (USA)	Signed to one-year contract with club option	December 17, 2025
Nikola Petković (SER)	44	MF	Charlotte FC (USA)	One-year loan from Charlotte FC in exchange for a third-round pick in the 2027 MLS SuperDraft and up to $250,000 in general allocation money	January 8, 2026
Sebatian Gomez (USA)	90	MF	Tacoma Defiance (USA)	Signed to four-year Homegrown Player contract with club option	January 13, 2026
Yu Tsukanome (JPN)	36	FW	Tacoma Defiance (USA)	Signed to one-year contract with club option	January 13, 2026
Peter Kingston (USA)	45	MF	Tacoma Defiance (USA)	Short-term agreement under "extreme hardship" rule	March 14, 2026
Antino Lopez (USA)	35	DF	Tacoma Defiance (USA)	Short-term agreement under "extreme hardship" rule	March 14, 2026
Antino Lopez (USA)	35	DF	Tacoma Defiance (USA)	Signed to one-year contract with club options	March 17, 2026
Peter Kingston (USA)	45	MF	Tacoma Defiance (USA)	Signed to one-year contract with club options	April 3, 2026
Dejan Joveljić (SRB)	9	FW	Sporting Kansas City (USA)	Traded for $6 million; signed four-year Designated Player contract with club option	August 25, 2026
Caden Clark (USA)	8	MF	D.C. United (USA)	Traded for second round pick in the 2028 MLS SuperDraft pick and $50,000 in 2027 general allocation money if retained by Seattle	September 3, 2026

=== Out ===
Outgoing transfers for Seattle Sounders FC
Player	No.	Pos.	New team	Notes	Date
Leo Burney (USA)	4	DF	Drogheda United (IRE)	Option declined	November 26, 2025
Jacob Castro (USA)	29	GK	Rhode Island FC (USA)	Option declined	November 26, 2025
Ryan Kent (ENG)	77	MF		Option declined	November 26, 2025
Travian Sousa (USA)	3	DF	Akademisk Boldklub (DEN)	Option declined	November 26, 2025
Jonathan Bell (JAM)	15	DF	Austin FC (USA)	Out of contract	November 26, 2025
João Paulo (BRA)	6	MF	Retired	Out of contract	November 26, 2025
Danny Leyva (USA)	75	MF	Club Necaxa (MEX)	Transferred for undisclosed amount	December 8, 2025
Obed Vargas (MEX)	18	MF	Atlético Madrid (ESP)	Transferred for undisclosed amount with a sell-on percentage	February 2, 2026
Reed Baker-Whiting (USA)	21	MF	Nashville SC (USA)	Traded for $800,000 in guaranteed compensation and $300,000 if performance metrics are met with a sell-on percentage	February 18, 2026
Georgi Minoungou (USA)	93	MF	Colorado Rapids (USA)	Traded for $2 million in general allocation money over two years with a sell-on percentage	March 27, 2026
Cody Baker (USA)	33	DF	New England Revolution (USA)	Loaned until end of the 2026 season in exchange for 2027 MLS SuperDraft first-round pick with sell-on clause	July 15, 2026
Yu Tsukanome (JPN)	36	FW	Pittsburgh Riverhounds SC (USA)	Loaned until end of the 2026 season	July 28, 2026
Osaze De Rosario (GUY)	95	FW	Sønderjyske Fodbold (DEN)	Loaned until June 2027 with right to recall in January 2027	September 1, 2026

=== Draft picks ===
Draft picks were not automatically signed to the team roster. Only those who are signed to a contract were listed as transfers in. Only trades involving draft picks and executed after the start of the 2026 MLS SuperDraft are listed in the notes.

2026 MLS SuperDraft picks for Seattle Sounders FC
Player	Nationality	Round	Pick	Pos.	Previous team	Notes
Joe Dale	United States	2nd	51	MF	Washington Huskies (USA)	
Stockton Short	United States	3rd	81	GK	Utah Tech Trailblazers (USA)	

=== Other transactions ===
- On January 16, 2026, Seattle Sounders FC sold two international roster slots to the New York Red Bulls for $350,000 in 2026 general allocation money and $50,000 in 2027 general allocation money.
- On January 16, 2026, Seattle Sounders FC sold two international roster slots to Charlotte FC for $300,000 in 2026 general allocation money and $100,000 in 2027 general allocation money.
- On October 9, 2026, Seattle Sounders FC sold one international roster slot to Real Salt Lake for $50,000 in 2026 general allocation money.

== Player awards ==
=== MLS All-Star Game ===
Player	No.	Position	Ref.
Jackson Ragen	1st	Defender	

=== MLS Team of the Matchday ===
Week	Player(s)	Opponent(s)	Ref.
1	Bench: Paul Rothrock	Colorado Rapids	
3	XI: Kalani Kossa-Rienzi	St. Louis City SC	
4	XI: Andrew Thomas; Coach: Brian Schmetzer	San Jose Earthquakes	
5	Bench: Nouhou	Minnesota United FC	
6	Bench: Paul Rothrock	Houston Dynamo FC	
8	XI: Cristian Roldan	St. Louis City SC	
10	Bench: Jordan Morris	FC Dallas	
13	XI: Nouhou	San Jose Earthquakes	
23	XI: Dejan Joveljić	Chicago Fire FC	
27	Bench: Albert Rusnák	Colorado Rapids	
28	Bench: Albert Rusnák	Minnesota United FC	
29	Bench: Paul Arriola	New England Revolution	
