= 2024 Seattle Sounders FC season =

American soccer team season

Seattle Sounders FC
2024 season
- General manager: Craig Waibel
- Head coach: Brian Schmetzer
- Stadium: Lumen Field
- Major League Soccer: Conference: 4th Overall: 7th
- MLS Cup playoffs: Conference finals
- U.S. Open Cup: Semifinals
- Leagues Cup: Quarterfinals
- Top goalscorer: League: Jordan Morris (13); All: Jordan Morris (18)
- Highest home attendance: League: 36,341 vs. Portland (Oct. 19)
- Lowest home attendance: League: 29,244 vs. Real Salt Lake (May 29)
- Average home league attendance: League: 30,754
- Biggest win: League: 5–0 vs. Montréal (Apr. 6)
- Biggest defeat: League: 0–3 vs. LAFC (Jul. 20)
Home colors	Away colors

The 2024 season was the sixteenth season for Seattle Sounders FC in Major League Soccer (MLS), the top flight of professional club soccer in the United States. It was the 41st season for a professional team bearing the Sounders name, which had originated in 1974 with the first incarnation of the franchise. The team remained under the management of Brian Schmetzer in his eighth full MLS season as head coach of the Sounders.

The club finished with an overall record of 22 wins, 13 losses, and 12 draws in their 47 competitive matches in 2024, which included regular season, Leagues Cup, U.S. Open Cup, and MLS Cup playoffs matches. The Sounders finished as runners-up in the Western Conference Final in the playoffs and semifinalists in the U.S. Open Cup. In their final 11 matches of the season (including four playoff matches), the team conceded only six goals.

== Background ==
The Sounders finished second in the Western Conference during the 2023 regular season and qualified for the MLS Cup playoffs after missing the 2022 edition. The team were eliminated in the Conference Semifinals by Los Angeles FC, which ended a 19-match home unbeaten streak in the playoffs. Throughout the year, Seattle had one of the best defenses in MLS but were unable to produce many goals, especially during the absence of Cristian Roldan. The roster had not changed significantly during the year due to salary cap constraints and largely was retained from the 2022 season.

The 2024 season was the first for the Sounders under their updated logo, unveiled in September 2023 as part of the club's 50th anniversary celebrations. It was also the first season at their new headquarters and training facility, the Sounders FC Center at Longacres in Renton, which opened in February 2024 and replaced the Starfire Sports complex in nearby Tukwila. The new facility, shared with the Tacoma Defiance and academy teams, includes four full-size fields, a dedicated kitchen and lounge, and a players' clubhouse.

== Summary ==
=== Preseason ===
The team was expected to undergo major roster changes after the expiration of contracts for key players according to Craig Waibel, who entered his second year as general manager. Among the departures was former captain and midfielder Nicolás Lodeiro, who has a Designated Player contract that expires during the offseason. He entered free agency on December 12, 2023. Seattle's two other Designated Players, Raúl Ruidíaz and Albert Rusnák, have contracts that run through the season.

On December 4, 2023, the club announced that they would retain 22 players from the 2023 roster and declined the contract options for backup goalkeeper Stefan Cleveland, midfielder Ethan Dobbelaere, and forward Héber. Goalkeeper Stefan Frei signed a new two-year contract the following day. The Sounders selected three players in the 2024 MLS SuperDraft, including two from colleges in the Pacific Northwest, and acquired defender Jonathan Bell in the Re-Entry Draft. Bell was signed on January 12 alongside forward Braudílio Rodrigues, a former Tacoma Defiance player. With the return of Danny Leyva from his loan to the Colorado Rapids, the Sounders entered preseason with three young center midfielders who would compete to play alongside João Paulo. On January 24, the team announced the signing of Argentinian forward Pedro de la Vega to four-year Young Designated Player contract—the first in Sounders history.

The Sounders opened their training camp in the Seattle area on January 16 and then traveled to Marbella Football Center Spain for preseason friendlies and additional training. The team played their first preseason opponent, Serbian club FK TSC, on January 31 and won 3–2 over the course of two hour-long scrimmages with two different lineups. The Sounders then defeated Swedish side IFK Norrköping and lost to Danish side Odense BK in two matches; all three matches in Marbella were played without the team's starting defenders due to injuries and national team call-ups. The team returned to Seattle and opened the new Longacres training facility on February 13. The Sounders played their final preseason friendlies against Sacramento Republic FC and reserves from the Tacoma Defiance at Longacres on February 17; the team lost the first match against Sacramento and won the second match, which was split between Sacramento and Tacoma players. Following the matches, Schmetzer said that the Sounders "didn't play up to their potential" but said that new signing Pedro de la Vega's abilities "are as advertised".

=== February–April ===
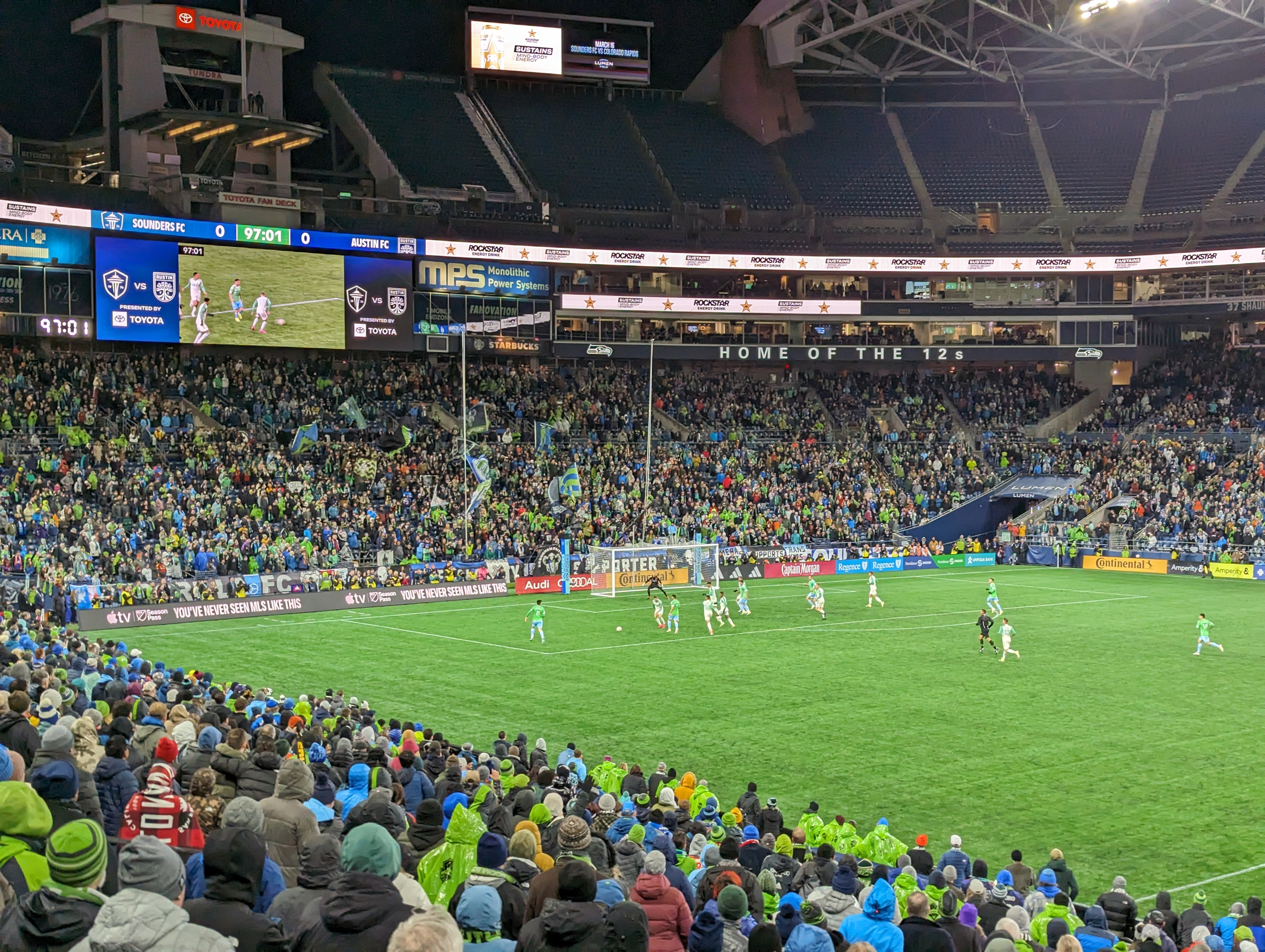
The first home match of the season for Seattle Sounders FC, a scoreless draw with Austin FC

The first match of the season, against MLS Cup runners-up Los Angeles FC, was played on the road due to the installation of new FieldTurf at Lumen Field. The Sounders traveled without several injured starters, including goalkeeper Stefan Frei, defender Yeimar Gómez Andrade, and midfielder Albert Rusnák. The team played with a modified two-forward formation and conceded two goals by the 55th minute; back-up goalkeeper Andrew Thomas made four saves in his debut. Pedro de la Vega scored from a penalty kick in the 72nd minute that was awarded by the video assistant referee for a foul on Jordan Morris; the match ended in a 2–1 loss for Seattle.

Former captain and midfielder Osvaldo Alonso returned to retire with the Sounders and signed a one-day contract on February 29, 2024. The team's home opener ended as a scoreless draw with Austin FC; the Sounders outshot their opponent 24–3 but were unable to score from their chances. Pedro de la Vega left early in the second half with a right hamstrung injury, which the Sounders later announced would prevent him from playing for six to eight weeks. The team traveled across the country to face the Philadelphia Union at Subaru Park, but the match was suspended in the sixth minute due to the waterlogged field. After an evaluation, the match was postponed to a later date; the Union's planned trip to Mexico for the CONCACAF Champions Cup made a next-day rematch infeasible. Back at home, the Sounders faced the Colorado Rapids in a match that ended with a 1–1 draw. The Sounders then experienced consecutive losses on the road with a 3–2 loss to the San Jose Earthquakes and a 1–0 loss to the LA Galaxy. With a record of 0 wins, 3 loses, and 2 draws, it was also the Sounders' worst season start since 2018 when they began with 0 wins, 3 loses, and 1 draw.

The Sounders began April at home with their first win of the season in a 5–0 defeat of CF Montréal. Striker Raúl Ruidíaz, who had scored two goals and one assist against Montreal, was named Player of the Matchday for his performance. On the road, the Sounders faced off against FC Dallas for a match ending in a scoreless draw while Frei made his 300th regular season appearance. The Sounders experienced another pair of consecutive losses after losing 2–0 at home to the Vancouver Whitecaps, their Cascadia Cup rivals, and 2–1 on the road against D.C. United. On April 23, the Sounders traded defender Xavier Arreaga to the New England Revolution in exchange for a 2025 international roster slot and $75,000 in general allocation money. The Sounders returned to Subaru Park to face the Union in a continuation of the match that had been previously suspended in March. During the first half, the Sounders took the lead with a brace from Ruidíaz and a goal from Obed Vargas, the first of his MLS career. Early in the second half, defensive errors allowed the Union to score two goals but the Sounders held on for a 3–2 win.

=== May–July ===
Back at home in May, the Sounders faced the LA Galaxy in a rematch that ended in a scoreless draw despite the Sounders outshooting the Galaxy 11–3. In a midweek match at the Starfire Sports Complex, the Sounders advanced to the round of 16 in the U.S. Open Cup after defeating Louisville City FC on penalties. Thomas, who had been signed to a new three-year contract on May 6, made the match-winning penalty kick. On the road in a rivalry match against the Portland Timbers, the Sounders won 2–1, ending a run of six losses against the Timbers. The Sounders then traveled to play Real Salt Lake in a midweek fixture that ended in a 2–0 loss for Seattle. Back at home, the Sounders were held to a 1–1 draw against Vancouver in a match that featured the return of Pedro de la Vega who had been dealing with hamstring injuries since the first two games of the year. In the round of 16 for the U.S. Open Cup, the Sounders defeated USL Championship club Phoenix Rising FC 2–1 at Starfire. Following a 2–1 win away against St. Louis City SC, the Sounders improved their standings to place them above the playoffs qualification line. At home, Rusnák scored his first goal of the season in a 1–1 draw against Real Salt Lake.

In June, the Sounders lost 2–1 on the road against Sporting Kansas City after conceding a late goal. The Sounders celebrated their fiftieth anniversary in a home match against Minnesota United FC. They won 2–0 with goal contributions from Morris and forward Paul Rothrock, his first of the season. On the road, the Sounders were held to a 2–2 draw against the Houston Dynamo FC that saw defender Jackson Ragen score his first goal of his MLS career. The Sounders then began a three-game homestand with a 3–2 victory over FC Dallas that featured a brace from Morris. Rusnák then scored his own brace against Chicago Fire FC by converting penalties for a 2–1 win, putting Seattle above the playoff line in ninth place. Prior to the match against Chicago Fire, Schmetzer announced Ruidíaz and Nouhou had been banned from training with the team for a week due to an "internal matter".

== Non-competitive matches ==
Key

Win Draw Loss Void Upcoming fixture

=== Preseason matches ===
January 31	Seattle Sounders FC	1–1	FK TSC	Marbella, Spain
6:00 am PST	Minoungou 34'	Report	Đakovac 1'	Stadium: Marbella Football Center
Note: 60-minute scrimmage

January 31	Seattle Sounders FC	2–1	FK TSC	Marbella, Spain
7:00 am PST	Teves 23'; Rusnák 60'	Report	Milosavljević (yellow card) 11'; Kuveljić 44'	Stadium: Marbella Football Center
Note: 60-minute scrimmage

February 4	Seattle Sounders FC	3–0	IFK Norrköping	Marbella, Spain
3:30 am PST	Rusnák 6'; Léo Chú 39'; Teves 98'	Report		Stadium: Marbella Football Center
Note: 135-minute match

February 8	Seattle Sounders FC	0–3	Odense BK	Marbella, Spain
4:00 am PST	Baker (yellow card) 48'	Recap; Press release	Al Hajj 36' (pen.); Paulsen (yellow card) 64'; Kjerrumgaard 65'; Owusu 85'	Stadium: La Quinta Football Center

February 8	Seattle Sounders FC	1–2	Odense BK	Marbella, Spain
5:30 am PST	Ruidíaz 85'	Recap; Press release	Muçolli 7'; Fenger 11'; McCoy (yellow card) 51'	Stadium: La Quinta Football Center

February 17	Seattle Sounders FC	0–1	Sacramento Republic FC	Renton, Washington
10:00 am PST		Report	Cicerone 44'	Stadium: Sounders FC Center at Longacres

February 17	Seattle Sounders FC	4–0	Sacramento Republic FC	Renton, Washington
11:30 am PST	De la Vega 31'; Ruidíaz 45'; Bell 63'; Aquino 88'	Report		Stadium: Sounders FC Center at Longacres
Note: Sacramento was replaced by Tacoma Defiance players for the second half of the match.

== Competitions ==
In addition to league play, the Sounders also participated in several cup competitions. In July and August, MLS play halted for the Leagues Cup, an international competition with Liga MX clubs hosted in the United States and Canada. Seattle was one of eight MLS clubs that played in the U.S. Open Cup based on the 2023 Supporters' Shield standings; other MLS teams were represented by MLS Next Pro squads as part of a compromise between MLS and U.S. Soccer. MLS had previously announced their intention to not send any senior MLS squads to the competition due to fixture congestion and other factors.

=== Major League Soccer ===
==== League tables ====
MLS Western Conference table (2024)
Pos	Team	Pld	W	L	T	GF	GA	GD	Pts	Qualification
2	LA Galaxy	34	19	8	7	69	50	+19	64	Qualification for round one and the Leagues Cup
3	Real Salt Lake	34	16	7	11	65	48	+17	59	Qualification for round one and the Leagues Cup
4	Seattle Sounders FC	34	16	9	9	51	35	+16	57	Qualification for round one and the Leagues Cup
5	Houston Dynamo FC	34	15	10	9	47	39	+8	54	Qualification for round one and the Leagues Cup
6	Minnesota United FC	34	15	12	7	58	49	+9	52	Qualification for round one and the Leagues Cup

Source: MLS
Rules for classification: 1) points; 2) total wins; 3) total goal differential; 4) total goals scored; 5) fewer disciplinary points; 6) away goal differential; 7) away goals scored; 8) home goals differential; 9) home goals scored; 10) coin toss (2 clubs tied) or drawing of lots (≥3 clubs tied)

Overall MLS standings table
Pos	Team	Pld	W	L	T	GF	GA	GD	Pts	Qualification
5	FC Cincinnati	34	18	11	5	58	48	+10	59	Qualification for the CONCACAF Champions Cup round one (Note: As highest-ranked club in 2024 MLS Supporters' Shield not already qualified)
6	Real Salt Lake	34	16	7	11	65	48	+17	59	Qualification for the CONCACAF Champions Cup round one (Note: As second highest-ranked club in 2024 MLS Supporters' Shield not already qualified)
7	Seattle Sounders FC	34	16	9	9	51	35	+16	57	Qualification for the CONCACAF Champions Cup round one (Note: As third highest-ranked club in 2024 MLS Supporters' Shield not already qualified)
8	Houston Dynamo FC	34	15	10	9	47	39	+8	54	Qualification for the U.S. Open Cup round of 32 (Note: As one of the best U.S. teams in the overall table to not qualify for the 2025 CONCACAF Champions Cup)
9	Orlando City SC	34	15	12	7	59	50	+9	52	Qualification for the U.S. Open Cup round of 32

Source: MLS
Rules for classification: 1) points; 2) total wins; 3) total goal differential; 4) total goals scored; 5) fewer disciplinary points; 6) away goal differential; 7) away goals scored; 8) home goals differential; 9) home goals scored; 10) coin toss (2 clubs tied) or drawing of lots (≥3 clubs tied)

==== Results summary ====
Overall								Home						Away					
Pld	W	D	L	GF	GA	GD	Pts	W	D	L	GF	GA	GD	W	D	L	GF	GA	GD
34	16	9	9	51	35	+16	57	8	7	2	25	14	+11	8	2	7	26	21	+5

Last updated: October 19, 2024.
Source: MLS

Results by matchday
Matchday	1	2	3	4	5	6	7	8	9	10	11	12	13	14	15	16	17	18	19	20	21	22	23	24	25	26	27	28	29	30	31	32	33	34
Stadium	A	H	A	H	A	A	H	A	H	A	H	A	A	H	A	H	A	A	H	A	H	H	H	A	H	H	A	A	H	H	H	A	A	H
Result	L	D	W	D	L	L	W	D	L	L	D	W	L	D	W	D	L	W	D	W	W	W	W	W	L	W	L	W	W	D	W	W	W	D
Position	11	11	12	13	14	14	12	12	12	13	11	10	10	10	9	10	10	9	10	10	9	7	7	6	7	5	8	5	5	5	5	3	3	4

Source: MLS
A = Away; H = Home; W = Win; D = Draw; L = Loss

==== Regular season ====
The 2024 regular season schedule was released on December 20, 2023. The Sounders played 34 matches during the regular season from February 24 to October 19. Of those regular season matches, 28 were played against teams in the Western Conference; the six matches against teams from the Eastern Conference were all played before the Leagues Cup break in July.

February 24 1	Los Angeles FC	2–1	Seattle Sounders FC	Los Angeles, California
1:30 pm PST	Tillman 45', (yellow card) 89'; Bogusz 55'; Long (yellow card) 72'	Report	C. Roldan (yellow card) 37'; Nouhou (yellow card) 66'; De la Vega 72' (pen.)	Stadium: BMO Field; Attendance: 22,214; Referee: Wesley Costa

March 2 2	Seattle Sounders FC	0–0	Austin FC	Seattle, Washington
7:30 pm PST	Arreaga (yellow card) 22'; Morris (yellow card) 83'	Report	Valencia (yellow card) 48'; Kolmanič (yellow card) 57'; Ring (yellow card) 57'; Wolff (yellow card) 89'	Stadium: Lumen Field; Attendance: 30,067; Referee: Rafael Santos

March 9 3	Philadelphia Union	v	Seattle Sounders FC	Chester, Pennsylvania
4:30 pm PST		Report		Stadium: Subaru Park
Note: Match began on March 9 at 4:30 pm PST but entered a weather delay in the 6th minute and was later postponed to April 30 at 4:30 pm PDT.

March 16 4	Seattle Sounders FC	1–1	Colorado Rapids	Seattle, Washington
12:30 pm PDT	Ruidíaz 11' (pen.); Nouhou (yellow card) 42'; Atencio (yellow card) 48' (yellow-red card) 57'; Leyva (yellow card) 86'	Report	Steffen (yellow card) 12'; Cabral 88', (yellow card) 90+2'	Stadium: Lumen Field; Attendance: 30,036; Referee: Trevor Wiseman

March 23 5 (HC)	San Jose Earthquakes	3–2	Seattle Sounders FC	San Jose, California
7:30 pm PDT	Vítor Costa 42'; Espinoza 43'; Ebobisse 82'; Skahan (yellow card) 90+3'	Report	Teves (yellow card) 52'; Ragen (yellow card) 65'; Ruidíaz 72' (pen.); Musovski 81'	Stadium: PayPal Park; Attendance: 16,109; Referee: Gabriele Ciampi

March 30 6	LA Galaxy	1–0	Seattle Sounders FC	Carson, California
7:30 pm PDT	Pec 4'	Report	A. Roldán (yellow card) 60'; Ruidíaz (yellow card) 68'; Nouhou (yellow card) 90+3'	Stadium: Dignity Health Sports Park; Attendance: 22,736; Referee: Ismail Elfath

April 6 7	Seattle Sounders FC	5–0	CF Montréal	Seattle, Washington
7:30 pm PDT	Ruidíaz 20', 27'; Ragen (yellow card) 45+4'; Morris 48'; A. Roldán 81'; Teves 90+7'	Report	Waterman (yellow card) 26'; Saliba (yellow card) 42' (yellow-red card) 53'; Zouhir (yellow card) 90+2'; Campbell (yellow card) 90+3'	Stadium: Lumen Field; Attendance: 30,013; Referee: Filip Dujic

April 13 8	FC Dallas	0–0	Seattle Sounders FC	Frisco, Texas
5:30 pm PDT	Sealy (yellow card) 45'; Arriola (yellow card) 73'	Report		Stadium: Toyota Stadium; Attendance: 19,096; Referee: Alexis Da Silva

April 20 9 (CC)	Seattle Sounders FC	0–2	Vancouver Whitecaps FC	Seattle, Washington
7:30 pm PDT	Ragen (red card) 43'; Musovski (yellow card) 70'; C. Roldan (red card) 75'	Report	Veselinović (yellow card) 45+6'; Gauld 58'; White 71', (yellow card) 79'; Cubas (yellow card) 85'	Stadium: Lumen Field; Attendance: 30,550; Referee: Ramy Touchan

April 27 10	D.C. United	2–1	Seattle Sounders FC	Washington, D.C.
4:30 pm PDT	McVey (yellow card) 5'; Benteke 32' (pen.), 44'; Bartlett (yellow card) 38'; Stroud (yellow card) 42'; Hopkins (yellow card) 67'; Rodríguez (yellow card) 82'	Report	Chú 14'; Frei (red card) 28'; Morris (yellow card) 41'	Stadium: Audi Field; Attendance: 18,223; Referee: Rosendo Mendoza

April 30 3	Philadelphia Union	2–3	Seattle Sounders FC	Chester, Pennsylvania
4:30 pm PDT	McGlynn 56'; Uhre (yellow card) 45+10'; Gazdag 57'	Report	Ruidíaz 13', 37' (pen.); Vargas 22'; Ragen (yellow card) 27'; Nouhou (yellow card) 59'	Stadium: Subaru Park; Attendance: 18,525; Referee: Joe Dickerson
Note: Match began on March 9 at 4:30 pm PST but entered a weather delay in the 6th minute and was later postponed to April 30 at 4:30 pm PDT.

May 5 11	Seattle Sounders FC	0–0	LA Galaxy	Seattle, Washington
3:45 pm PDT	Morris (yellow card) 75'	Report	Paintsil (yellow card) 81'; Cerrillo (yellow card) 83'	Stadium: Lumen Field; Attendance: 31,102; Referee: Drew Fisher

May 12 12 (CC)	Portland Timbers	1–2	Seattle Sounders FC	Portland, Oregon
1:30 pm PDT	Mora 15'; Župarić (yellow card) 66'	Report	C. Roldan 19'; Ruidíaz 50'; Nouhou (yellow card) 54'	Stadium: Providence Park; Attendance: 25,218; Referee: Allen Chapman

May 15 13	Real Salt Lake	2–0	Seattle Sounders FC	Sandy, Utah
6:30 pm PDT	A. Gómez 27', (yellow card) 86'; Luna 58'; Barajas (yellow card) 90+2'	Report	Baker (yellow card) 55'; C. Roldan (yellow card) 85'	Stadium: America First Field; Attendance: 19,268; Referee: Ismir Pekmic

May 18 14 (CC)	Seattle Sounders FC	1–1	Vancouver Whitecaps FC	Seattle, Washington
7:30 pm PDT	Morris 9'; Vargas (yellow card) 36'; João Paulo (yellow card) 43'; Nouhou (yellow card) 89' (yellow-red card) 90+4'	Report	Laborda (yellow card) 77'; Gauld 90+5'	Stadium: Lumen Field; Attendance: 30,102; Referee: Victor Rivas

May 25 15	St. Louis City SC	1–2	Seattle Sounders FC	St. Louis, Missouri
5:30 pm PDT	Vassilev (yellow card) 35'; Blom (yellow card) 39'; Durkin (yellow card) 48'; Totland 82'	Report	Hiebert 66' (o.g.); Morris 69'; Kossa-Rienzi (yellow card) 80'; Yeimar (yellow card) 85'	Stadium: CityPark; Attendance: 22,500; Referee: Lukasz Szpala

May 29 16	Seattle Sounders FC	1–1	Real Salt Lake	Seattle, Washington
7:30 pm PDT	Rusnák 68'; Vargas (yellow card) 87'; Baker-Whiting (yellow card) 90+4'	Report	Oviedo (yellow card) 67'; Crooks (yellow card) 75'; A. Gómez 90+9'	Stadium: Lumen Field; Attendance: 29,244; Referee: Sergii Boiko

June 8 17	Sporting Kansas City	2–1	Seattle Sounders FC	Kansas City, Kansas
5:30 pm PDT	Russell 19', (yellow card) 71'; Davis (yellow card) 45+2'; Vargas 85'; Shelton (yellow card) 90+4'	Report	Morris 12'; Baker-Whiting (yellow card) 61' (yellow-red card) 73'; Yeimar (yellow card) 71'	Stadium: Children's Mercy Park; Attendance: 18,177; Referee: Guido Gonzales Jr.

June 15 18	Seattle Sounders FC	2–0	Minnesota United FC	Seattle, Washington
7:30 pm PDT	Morris 28'; Rothrock 57'	Report	Tapias (yellow card) 27'; Clark (yellow card) 59'; Nyeman (red card) 90'	Stadium: Lumen Field; Attendance: 31,026; Referee: Rosendo Mendoza

June 19 19	Houston Dynamo FC	2–2	Seattle Sounders FC	Houston, Texas
7:30 pm PDT	Aliyu (yellow card) 6'; Blessing 30', 40'; Raines (yellow card) 89'; Steres (yellow card) 90+3'	Report	Rothrock 57'; Ragen 63'; Ruidíaz (yellow card) 90+4'	Stadium: Shell Energy Stadium; Attendance: 15,096; Referee: Drew Fischer

June 22 20	Seattle Sounders FC	3–2	FC Dallas	Seattle, Washington
7:30 pm PDT	Ruidíaz 78'; Vargas (yellow card) 80'; Morris 88', 90+4'	Report	Musa (yellow card) 27', (goal) 70'; Delgado 66'; Sealy (yellow card) 89'	Stadium: Lumen Field; Attendance: 30,093; Referee: Malik Badawi

June 29 21	Seattle Sounders FC	2–1	Chicago Fire FC	Seattle, Washington
7:30 pm PDT	Rusnák 57' (pen.), 90+3' (pen.), (yellow card) 90+4'; Ragen (yellow card) 77'	Report	Haile-Selassie 30'; Pineda (yellow card) 42'; Dean (yellow card) 56'	Stadium: Lumen Field; Attendance: 30,045; Referee: Joe Dickerson

July 6 22	Seattle Sounders FC	2–0	New England Revolution	Seattle, Washington
7:30 pm PDT	Morris 15', (yellow card) 90+4'; Rusnák 81'	Report	Arreaga (yellow card) 23'; Polster (yellow card) 89'	Stadium: Lumen Field; Attendance: 30,017; Referee: Ismir Pekmic

July 13 23	Austin FC	0–1	Seattle Sounders FC	Austin, Texas
5:30 pm PDT	Hines-Ike (yellow card) 58' (yellow-red card) 77'	Report	Yeimar (yellow card) 34'; Morris 63'	Stadium: Q2 Stadium; Attendance: 20,738; Referee: Jair Marrufo

July 17 24	Seattle Sounders FC	2–0	St. Louis City SC	Seattle, Washington
7:30 pm PDT	Parker 27' (o.g.); Bell 49'; Rothrock (yellow card) 90+2'	Report	Durkin (yellow card) 4'; Totland (yellow card) 38'	Stadium: Lumen Field; Attendance: 30,032; Referee: Alexis Da Silva

July 20 25	Seattle Sounders FC	0–3	Los Angeles FC	Seattle, Washington
7:30 pm PDT	Nouhou (yellow card) 14'; João Paulo (yellow card) 45+9'; Rothrock (yellow card) 55'	Report	Bouanga 16' (pen.), 74'; Bogusz 26', (yellow card) 62'; Murillo (yellow card) 85'	Stadium: Lumen Field; Attendance: 32,905; Referee: Allen Chapman

August 24 26	Minnesota United FC	2–3	Seattle Sounders FC	St. Paul, Minnesota
3:30 pm PDT	Yeboah 24' (pen.), 56'; Tapias (yellow card) 72'	Report	Nouhou (yellow card) 10'; Morris 11'; Ragen 28'; Rusnák 75'	Stadium: Allianz Field; Attendance: 19,751; Referee: Guido Gonzales Jr.

August 31 27 (CC)	Portland Timbers	1–0	Seattle Sounders FC	Portland, Oregon
7:30 pm PDT	Mosquera 55'	Report		Stadium: Providence Park; Attendance: 25,218; Referee: Lukasz Szpala

September 7 28	Columbus Crew	0–4	Seattle Sounders FC	Columbus, Ohio
4:30 pm PDT	Romero (red card) 45+3'	Report	De la Vega (yellow card) 29'; Rusnák 45+6', 67', 70'; Morris 60'	Stadium: Lower.com Field; Attendance: 20,523; Referee: Rosendo Mendoza
Note: Originally scheduled for June 1 and moved due to the 2024 CONCACAF Champions Cup final.

September 15 29	Seattle Sounders FC	2–0	Sporting Kansas City	Seattle, Washington
4:15 pm PDT	Ragen 19'; Baker-Whiting (yellow card) 29'; Rothrock 40'	Report	Sallói (yellow card) 37'; Bassong (yellow card) 46'	Stadium: Lumen Field; Attendance: 31,898; Referee: Drew Fischer

September 18 30 (HC)	Seattle Sounders FC	2–2	San Jose Earthquakes	Seattle, Washington
7:30 pm PDT	Morris 21', 39'	Report	Pellegrino 15'; López (yellow card) 20'; Espinoza (yellow card) 38'; Gruezo (yellow card) 51'; Marie 89'	Stadium: Lumen Field; Attendance: 29,326; Referee: Victor Rivas

September 28 31	Seattle Sounders FC	1–0	Houston Dynamo FC	Seattle, Washington
7:30 pm PDT	Rothrock 22'; Yeimar (yellow card) 63'	Report	Dorsey (yellow card) 28'; Escobar (yellow card) 50'; Carrasquilla (yellow card) 78'	Stadium: Lumen Field; Attendance: 30,015; Referee: Allen Chapman

October 2 32 (CC)	Vancouver Whitecaps FC	0–3	Seattle Sounders FC	Vancouver, British Columbia
7:30 pm PDT	Adekugbe (yellow card) 13'; Schöpf (yellow card) 39'; Picault (yellow card) 46' (yellow-red card) 88'; Priso (yellow card) 90+1'	Report	Minoungou 14'; Rusnák 65' (pen.); Rothrock 67'	Stadium: BC Place; Attendance: 17,361; Referee: Chris Penso

October 5 33	Colorado Rapids	0–1	Seattle Sounders FC	Commerce City, Colorado
7:30 pm PDT		Report	Yeimar (yellow card) 27'; Rusnák 48'; Ragen (yellow card) 65'	Stadium: Dick's Sporting Goods Park; Attendance: 18,096; Referee: Timothy Ford

October 19 34 (CC)	Seattle Sounders FC	1–1	Portland Timbers	Seattle, Washington
6:00 pm PDT	Nouhou (yellow card) 23'; Yeimar 37'; Rothrock (yellow card) 59'; Vargas (yellow card) 65' (yellow-red card) 69'; Rusnák (yellow card) 69'	Report	Antony 68'; Rodríguez (yellow card) 90+5'	Stadium: Lumen Field; Attendance: 36,341; Referee: Ismir Pekmic

=== MLS Cup Playoffs ===
==== Round One ====
October 28 Game 1	Seattle Sounders FC	0–0 (5–4 p)	Houston Dynamo FC	Seattle, Washington
5:50 pm PDT	João Paulo (yellow card) 61'; Ragen (yellow card) 62'; Leyva (yellow card) 72'; Rothrock (yellow card) 83'	Report	Herrera (yellow card) 55'; Carrasquilla (red card) 66'	Stadium: Lumen Field; Attendance: 30,026; Referee: Ted Unkel
	Penalties
	Ruidíaz (penalty scored); Rusnák (penalty scored); Ragen (penalty scored); C. Roldan (penalty scored); A. Roldán (penalty scored)		(penalty scored) Ponce; (penalty scored) Dorsey; (penalty scored) Kowalczyk; (penalty missed) Sviatchenko; (penalty scored) Steres

November 3 Game 2	Houston Dynamo FC	1–1 (6–7 p)	Seattle Sounders FC	Houston, Texas
3:30 pm PST	Escobar (yellow card) 63'; Herrera (yellow card) 65' (red card) 66'; Artur (yellow card) 79'; Dorsey (yellow card) 85'; C. Roldan 90+3' (o.g.)	Report	Nouhou (yellow card) 85'; C. Roldan 87'	Stadium: Shell Energy Stadium; Attendance: 18,859; Referee: Armando Villarreal
	Penalties
	Ponce (penalty scored); Dorsey (penalty scored); Kowalczyk (penalty scored); Ferreira (penalty scored); Steres (penalty scored); Raines (penalty scored); Schmitt (penalty missed)		(penalty scored) C. Roldan; (penalty scored) Ragen; (penalty scored) A. Roldán; (penalty scored) Leyva; (penalty scored) Ruidíaz; (penalty scored) Minoungou; (penalty scored) Vargas

Seattle Sounders FC advances with a 2–0 record.

==== Conference Semifinals ====
November 23 Conf. Semifinal	Los Angeles FC	1–2 (a.e.t.)	Seattle Sounders FC	Los Angeles, California
7:30 pm PST	Chanot (yellow card) 42'; Hollingshead 50'; Bogusz (yellow card) 77'	Report	Chanot 59' (o.g.); Yeimar (yellow card) 95'; Morris 109'; João Paulo (yellow card) 112'	Stadium: BMO Stadium; Attendance: 22,301; Referee: Guido Gonzales Jr.

==== Conference Finals ====
November 30 Conf. Final	LA Galaxy	1–0	Seattle Sounders FC	Carson, California
7:00 pm PST	Joveljic 85'	Report	De la Vega (yellow card) 55'; C. Roldan (yellow card) 61'; Nouhou (yellow card) 74'; Ragen (yellow card) 90+6'	Stadium: Dignity Health Sports Park; Attendance: 26,327; Referee: Drew Fischer

=== U.S. Open Cup ===
On March 1, 2024, the Sounders were confirmed as one of eight MLS clubs that would enter the 2024 U.S. Open Cup in the round of 32 with their full senior squad, while other MLS clubs were represented by their MLS Next Pro counterparts. Seattle qualified as one of the top seven clubs in the 2023 regular season standings that is not participating in the 2024 CONCACAF Champions Cup.

May 8 Round of 32	Seattle Sounders FC	2–2 (a.e.t.) (5–4 p)	Louisville City FC	Tukwila, Washington
7:30 pm PDT	Rothrock 41'; Musovski 63'	Report	Charpie (yellow card) 61'; Totsch 67' (pen.); Dia (yellow card) 78'; Gonzalez 89'; Adams (yellow card) 90'	Stadium: Starfire Sports; Attendance: 3,207; Referee: Cristian Campo Hernandez
	Penalties
	Musovski (penalty missed); Leyva (penalty scored); Lopez (penalty scored); Léo Chú (penalty missed); Brunell (penalty scored); De Rosario (penalty missed); Kossa-Rienzi (penalty scored); Thomas (penalty scored)		(penalty missed) Totsch; (penalty missed) Wynder; (penalty scored) Ordoñez; (penalty scored) Davila; (penalty scored) McCabe; (penalty missed) Gleadle; (penalty scored) Wilson; (penalty missed) Adams

May 22 Round of 16	Seattle Sounders FC	2–1	Phoenix Rising FC	Tukwila, Washington
7:30 pm PDT	A. Roldán 68' (pen.); Kossa-Rienzi 88'	Report	Cabral 45+5' (pen.); Stenberg (yellow card) 66'; Azócar (yellow card) 71'	Stadium: Starfire Sports; Attendance: 3,314; Referee: Lukasz Szpala

July 9 Quarterfinals	Sacramento Republic FC	1–2	Seattle Sounders FC	Sacramento, California
8:00 pm PDT	Ross (yellow card) 5'; Herrera 49'; Parano (yellow card) 51'; Gurr (yellow card) 56'	Report	Atencio 16'; Morris 31'	Stadium: Heart Health Park; Attendance: 11,569; Referee: Ted Unkel

August 28 Semifinals	Seattle Sounders FC	0–1	Los Angeles FC	Tukwila, Washington
7:30 pm PDT	Yeimar (yellow card) 50'; De la Vega (yellow card) 83'	Report	Long (yellow card) 45+1'; Bouanga 83' (pen.), (yellow card) 90+4'; Palencia (yellow card) 90+3'	Stadium: Starfire Sports; Attendance: 4,109; Referee: Ricardo Fierro
Note: Originally scheduled for August 27.

=== Leagues Cup ===
The 2024 Leagues Cup, the second edition of the expanded inter-league competition between MLS and Liga MX hosted in the United States and Canada, began on July 26. All MLS matches were paused until the end of the tournament on August 25. The Sounders were drawn into group West 6 alongside Minnesota United FC and Liga MX's Club Necaxa; the competition's schedule was released on March 14, 2024. MLS teams played a minimum of two matches in the tournament, of which they hosted at least one; matches did not include extra time and proceed directly into a penalty shootout if tied after regulation time.

==== Group stage ====
Pos	Team	Pld	W	PW	PL	L	GF	GA	GD	Pts	Qualification	NEC	SEA	MIN
1	(Mexican Football Federation) Necaxa	2	1	0	0	1	3	2	+1	3	Advance to knockout stage	—	—	—
2	(United States Soccer Federation) Seattle Sounders FC	2	1	0	0	1	3	3	0	3	Advance to knockout stage	1–3	—	2–0
3	(United States Soccer Federation) Minnesota United FC	2	1	0	0	1	1	2	−1	3		1–0	—	—

Source: Leagues Cup
Rules for classification: Tiebreakers

July 26 GS	Seattle Sounders FC (United States)	2–0	(United States) Minnesota United FC	Seattle, Washington
7:00 pm PDT	Nouhou (yellow card) 43'; Morris 87'; Rothrock 90+4'	Report	Harvey (yellow card) 41'; Dotson (red card) 65'	Stadium: Lumen Field; Attendance: 28,526; Referee: Joe Dickerson

August 4 GS	Seattle Sounders FC (United States)	1–3	(Mexico) Club Necaxa	Seattle, Washington
7:30 pm PDT	Vargas 8'	Report	Palavecino 24', (yellow card) 63'; Cambindo 44'; Garnica (yellow card) 70'; Rosero 90+2'	Stadium: Lumen Field; Attendance: 26,513; Referee: Oshane Nation

==== Knockout stage ====
August 8 Round of 32	Seattle Sounders FC (United States)	3–1	(United States) LA Galaxy	Seattle, Washington
7:30 pm PDT	Yeimar 4'; Ragen 7', (yellow card) 45'; João Paulo (yellow card) 19'; A. Roldán 45+4'; Rothrock (yellow card) 52'; Vargas (yellow card) 66'; Baker-Whiting (yellow card) 84'	Report	Cerrillo 44'; Puig (yellow card) 80'; Gabriel Pec 83'; Paintsil (yellow card) 90+2'	Stadium: Lumen Field; Attendance: 17,242; Referee: Lukasz Szpala

August 12 Round of 16	Seattle Sounders FC (United States)	4–0	(Mexico) Pumas UNAM	Seattle, Washington
7:30 pm PDT	C. Roldan (yellow card) 29'; Rothrock 32'; Vargas (yellow card) 37'; Morris 58', 90+5' (pen.); Rusnák 71' (pen.); Leyva (yellow card) 87'	Report	Duarte (yellow card) 28'; Ruvalcaba (yellow card) 45'; Huerta (yellow card) 69'; Magallán (yellow card) 89' (yellow-red card) 90+2'; Pussetto (yellow card) 90+4'	Stadium: Lumen Field; Attendance: 23,189; Referee: Joe Dickerson

August 17 Quarterfinals	Seattle Sounders FC (United States)	0–3	(United States) Los Angeles FC	Seattle, Washington
8:00 pm PDT	C. Roldan (yellow card) 60'	Report	Hollingshead 14'; Kamara 25'; Bouanga 53'	Stadium: Lumen Field; Attendance: 19,643; Referee: César Ramos

== Players ==
For the 2024 season, the Sounders were permitted a maximum of 30 signed players on the first team, of which 10 roster positions were designated for supplemental and reserve players. Additional homegrown players are eligible to be signed to off-roster slots and are able to appear in MLS matches through short-term agreements. A base salary cap of $5.47 million applied to the non-supplemental players with exceptions for certain categories, including up to three Designated Players who counted for a set amount in the cap. The Sounders were also allocated six international slots that were filled by players from outside the United States who did not have a green card. Two of these slots were traded in January 2024 to Los Angeles FC for general allocation money to be used in 2025.

=== Roster ===
As of May 8, 2024

Note: Flags indicate national team as defined under FIFA eligibility rules. Players may hold more than one non-FIFA nationality. Squad includes all players who had first team contracts or appearances during the 2024 season across all competitions. Ages listed for each player is calculated from February 24, 2024, the first matchday of the MLS regular season.

Seattle Sounders FC first team roster
No.	Name	Nationality	Position	Age	Signed	Contract ends	Previous club	Notes
3	Xavier Arreaga	Ecuador	DF	29	2019	—	Barcelona S.C. (ECU)	
4	Nathan	Brazil	DF	28	2024	2024	San Jose Earthquakes (USA)	International
5	Nouhou Tolo	Cameroon	DF	26	2017	2025	Seattle Sounders FC 2 (USA)	
6	João Paulo	Brazil	MF	32	2020	2024	Botafogo (BRA)	
7	Cristian Roldan	United States	MF	28	2015	2027	Washington Huskies (USA)	
8	Josh Atencio	United States	MF	22	2020	2027	Tacoma Defiance (USA)	HGP
9	Raúl Ruidíaz	Peru	FW	33	2018	2024	Morelia (MEX)	DP
10	Pedro de la Vega	Argentina	MF	23	2024	2027	Lanús (ARG)	Young DP; International
11	Albert Rusnák	Slovakia	MF	29	2022	2024	Real Salt Lake (USA)	DP
13	Jordan Morris	United States	FW	29	2016	2027	Stanford Cardinal (USA)	HGP
14	Paul Rothrock	United States	MF	25	2023	2024	Tacoma Defiance (USA)	
15	Jonathan Bell	Jamaica	DF	26	2024	2024	St. Louis City SC (USA)	
16	Alex Roldán	El Salvador	DF	27	2018	2026	Seattle Redhawks (USA)	
17	Danny Musovski	United States	FW	28	2024	2025	Real Salt Lake (USA)	
18	Obed Vargas	Mexico	MF	18	2021	2025	Tacoma Defiance (USA)	HGP
21	Reed Baker-Whiting	United States	MF	18	2021	2024	Tacoma Defiance (USA)	HGP
23	Léo Chú	Brazil	MF	23	2021	2024	Grêmio (BRA)	
24	Stefan Frei (c)	Switzerland	GK	37	2014	2025	Toronto FC (CAN)	
25	Jackson Ragen	United States	DF	25	2022	2024	Tacoma Defiance (USA)	
26	Andrew Thomas	Russia	GK	25	2021	2027	Stanford Cardinal (USA)	
27	Braudílio Rodrigues	Portugal	FW	24	2024	2024	Tacoma Defiance (USA)	International
28	Yeimar Gómez Andrade	Colombia	DF	31	2020	2025	Unión de Santa Fe (ARG)	
29	Jacob Castro	United States	GK	24	2023	2024	San Diego State Aztecs (USA)	HGP
33	Cody Baker	United States	DF	20	2023	2026	Tacoma Defiance (USA)	HGP
35	Antino Lopez	United States	DF	20	2024	2024	Tacoma Defiance (USA)	Short-term loan
37	Snyder Brunell	United States	MF	15	2024	2024	Tacoma Defiance (USA)	Short-term loan
39	Stuart Hawkins	United States	DF	17	2023	2026	Tacoma Defiance (USA)	HGP
75	Danny Leyva	United States	MF	20	2019	2026	Tacoma Defiance (USA)	HGP
77	Sota Kitahara	United States	MF	21	2023	2024	Tacoma Defiance (USA)	HGP
85	Kalani Kossa-Rienzi	United States	MF	20	2024	2024	Tacoma Defiance (USA)	Short-term loan
93	Georgi Minoungou	Ivory Coast	MF	20	2024	2024	Tacoma Defiance (USA)	International
95	Osaze De Rosario	Guyana	FW	21	2024	2024	Tacoma Defiance (USA)	Short-term loan
99	Dylan Teves	United States	FW	23	2022	2024	Washington Huskies (USA)	HGP

== Coaching staff ==
As of January 2024

Technical staff
Head coach	Brian Schmetzer (USA)
Assistant coach	Preki (USA)
Director of goalkeeping	Tom Dutra (USA)
Assistant coach	Freddy Juarez (USA)
Assistant coach	Andy Rose (ENG)

== Transfers ==
For transfers in, dates listed are when Seattle Sounders FC officially signed the player to the roster. Transactions where only the rights to the players are acquired are not listed. For transfers out, dates listed are when Seattle Sounders FC officially removed the players from its roster, not when they signed with another club. If a player later signed with another club, his new club will be noted, but the date listed here remains the one when he was officially removed from the Seattle Sounders FC roster.

=== In ===
Incoming transfers for Seattle Sounders FC
Player	No.	Pos.	Previous team	Notes	Date
Danny Leyva (USA)	75	MF	Colorado Rapids (USA)	Loan expired	November 28, 2023
Nathan (BRA)	4	DF	San Jose Earthquakes (USA)	One-year contract with option for 2025	January 11, 2024
Jonathan Bell (JAM)	15	DF	St. Louis City SC (USA)	Acquired through 2023 MLS Re-Entry Draft on December 14, 2023.	January 12, 2024
Braudílio Rodrigues (POR)	27	FW	Tacoma Defiance (USA)	One-year contract with options for 2025 and 2026; college priority rights traded from New York City FC for natural third-round pick in 2025 MLS SuperDraft	January 12, 2024
Pedro de la Vega (ARG)	10	MF	Lanús (ARG)	Four-year contract with option for 2028; Young DP contract	January 24, 2024
Danny Musovski (USA)	17	FW	Real Salt Lake (USA)	Two-year contract with option for 2026	February 1, 2024
Georgi Minoungou (CIV)	93	FW	Tacoma Defiance (USA)	Four-year contract with option for 2029; originally a loan	August 28, 2024

==== Draft picks ====
Draft picks were not automatically signed to the team roster. Only those who are signed to a contract were listed as transfers in. Only trades involving draft picks and executed after the start of the 2024 MLS SuperDraft are listed in the notes.

2024 MLS SuperDraft picks for Seattle Sounders FC
Player	Round	Pick	Pos.	Previous team	Notes
Kalani Kossa-Rienzi (USA)	1st	23	DF	Washington Huskies (USA)	
Antino Lopez (USA)	2nd	52	DF	Duke Blue Devils (USA)	
Buba Fofanah (SLE)	3rd	81	FW	Portland Pilots (USA)	

=== Out ===
Outgoing transfers for Seattle Sounders FC
Player	No.	Pos.	New team	Notes	Date
Stefan Cleveland (USA)	30	GK	Austin FC (USA)	Option declined	December 4, 2023
Ethan Dobbelaere (USA)	45	MF	D.C. United (USA)	Option declined	December 4, 2023
Héber (BRA)	19	FW	Cangzhou Mighty Lions (CHN)	Option declined	December 4, 2023
Abdoulaye Cissoko (FRA)	92	DF	Memphis 901 FC (USA)	Out of contract	December 4, 2023
Nicolás Lodeiro (URU)	10	MF	Orlando City SC (USA)	Out of contract	December 4, 2023
Fredy Montero (COL)	12	FW	Deportivo Cali (COL)	Out of contract	December 4, 2023
Kelyn Rowe (USA)	22	MF	Retired	Out of contract	December 4, 2023
Xavier Arreaga (ECU)	3	DF	New England Revolution (USA)	Traded for 2025 international roster slot and up to $75,000 in general allocation money	April 23, 2024

== Player awards ==
=== MLS Best XI ===
Player	Position	Number
Yeimar Gómez Andrade	DF	2nd

=== MLS Player of the Matchday ===
Week	Player	Position	Opponent
8	Raúl Ruidíaz	FW	CF Montréal
31	Albert Rusnák	MF	Columbus Crew

=== MLS Goal of the Week ===
Week	Player	Opponent	Score (Result)
8	Raúl Ruidíaz	CF Montréal	1–0 (5–0)

=== MLS Team of the Matchday ===
Week	Player(s)	Opponent(s)
5	Bench: Andrew Thomas	Colorado Rapids
8	XI: Raúl Ruidíaz, Alex Roldán; Bench: Albert Rusnák	CF Montréal
13	Bench: Cristian Roldan	Portland Timbers
21	XI: Jackson Ragen	Houston Dynamo FC
22	XI: Jordan Morris, Albert Rusnák	FC Dallas
23	XI: Albert Rusnák	Chicago Fire FC
25	XI: Albert Rusnák; Bench: Stefan Frei	New England Revolution
26	Bench: Obed Vargas	Austin FC
27	XI: Jon Bell	St. Louis City SC
29	XI: Albert Rusnák; Bench: Jackson Ragen	Minnesota United FC
31	XI: Jordan Morris, Albert Rusnák, Cristian Roldan; Bench: Josh Atencio	Columbus Crew
32	XI: Jackson Ragen; Bench: Paul Rothrock	Sporting Kansas City
33	XI: Jordan Morris	San Jose Earthquakes
35	XI: Yeimar Gómez Andrade	Houston Dynamo FC
36	XI: Albert Rusnák	Vancouver Whitecaps FC
37	Bench: Obed Vargas	Colorado Rapids
38	Bench: Yeimar Gómez Andrade	Portland Timbers
