= List of Seattle Sounders FC seasons =

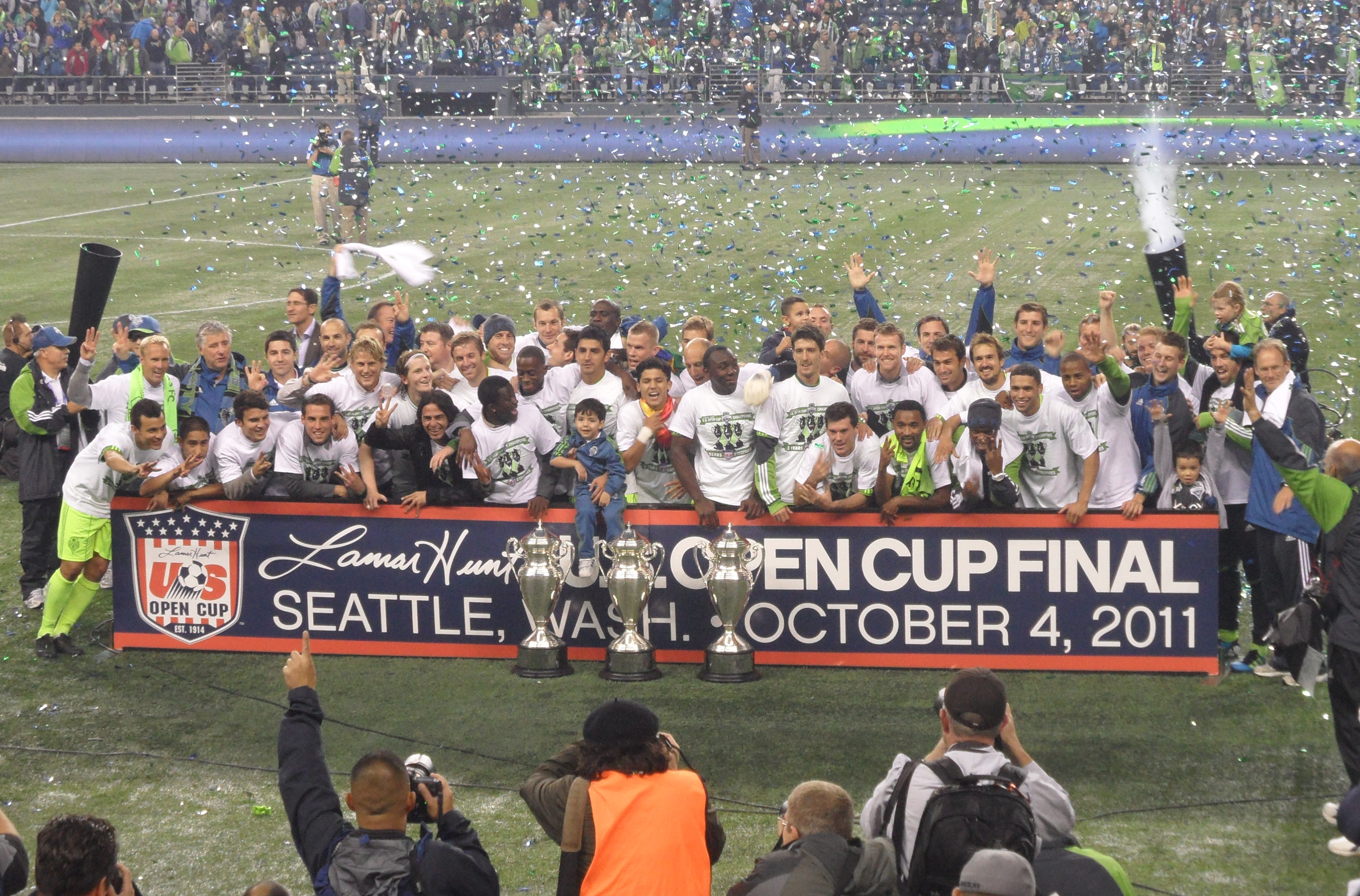
Seattle Sounders FC players with the 2009, 2010, and 2011 U.S. Open Cup trophies

Seattle Sounders FC is a soccer team based in Seattle, Washington, that competes in Major League Soccer (MLS), the most senior soccer league in the United States. The club was established in 2007 as an MLS expansion team, succeeding an existing second-division team of the same name, and began play in 2009 as a member of the Western Conference. The MLS regular season typically runs from February to October and the best-performing team is awarded the Supporters' Shield; the top nine teams from each conference qualify for the MLS Cup Playoffs, a postseason tournament that culminates in the MLS Cup.

In addition to league play, the Sounders are able to compete in the annual U.S. Open Cup tournament organized by the United States Soccer Federation and the Leagues Cup contested by teams from MLS and Liga MX of Mexico. The league and cup tournaments serve as qualifiers for the following year's CONCACAF Champions Cup (formerly the CONCACAF Champions League), an annual international competition between league and cup champions in North America, Central America, and the Caribbean. The CONCACAF Champions Cup winner then qualifies for the next FIFA Club World Cup, which is held annually but will switch to every four years beginning in 2025.

The Sounders are one of the most successful clubs in MLS history, having won nine major trophies since entering the league in 2009. They won three consecutive U.S. Open Cup titles from 2009 to 2011 and a fourth in 2014, becoming the second MLS club to do so. The club earned their first Supporters' Shield in 2014, completing a double, and won the MLS Cup in 2016 and 2019 during a run of four finals in five years. They won the CONCACAF Champions League in 2022, becoming the first MLS club to win the competition under its modern format and qualify for the FIFA Club World Cup. The Sounders won the Leagues Cup in 2025 and became the first MLS team to win all five of the major North American soccer competitions. Sigi Schmid was the club's head coach from the inaugural MLS season in 2009 until July 2016; he was replaced by Brian Schmetzer, initially as interim coach and later as full head coach. American striker Jordan Morris is the club's all-time top scorer with 95 goals in all competitions; he joined the club in 2016 and surpassed Raúl Ruidíaz's tally of 86 goals in 2025.

As of the end of the 2026 season, the club has played 18 seasons in MLS with 268 wins, 180 losses, and 144 draws in regular season play—a winning percentage of 0.574. The Sounders qualified for the MLS Cup Playoffs in their first 13 seasons—tied for the MLS record at the time and the second longest among the major sports leagues in the United States behind the National Hockey League's Pittsburgh Penguins. The Sounders led MLS attendance in their first eight years in the league, averaging over 30,000 per season, until they were surpassed by Atlanta United FC in 2017; the club achieved their highest season attendance in 2015 with 44,247 per match. As of 2025, the 278 regular season matches at Lumen Field in Seattle have averaged 36,508 spectators and drawn over 10.1 million total people; the club has hosted 29 playoff matches that drew an average of 34,451 spectators. The most-attended home Sounders match was the 2025 Leagues Cup final, which set a tournament record with 69,314 spectators. The team also set the tournament record for the CONCACAF Champions League with 68,741 spectators in the second leg of the 2022 final.

== Key ==
Key to competitions

- Major League Soccer (MLS) – The top-flight of soccer in the United States, established in 1996.
- U.S. Open Cup (USOC) – The premier knockout cup competition in U.S. soccer, first contested in 1914 and open to all registered teams.
- Leagues Cup (LC) – An inter-league competition hosted by MLS teams against clubs from Liga MX in Mexico since 2020.
- CONCACAF Champions Cup (CCC) – The premier club competition in North American soccer since 1962. It was named the Champions' Cup until 2008 and the CONCACAF Champions League from 2008 to 2023.
- Campeones Cup (CC) – A super cup match between the winners of the MLS Cup and Mexico's Campeón de Campeones, established in 2018.
- MLS is Back Tournament (MiB) – A club tournament for MLS teams held once during the 2020 season, which had been disrupted by the COVID-19 pandemic.
- FIFA Club World Cup (CWC) – The premier intercontinental club tournament organized by FIFA since 2000 between the winners of continental competitions, such as CONCACAF Champions Cup.

Key to colors and symbols

1st or W	Winners
2nd or RU	Runners-up
3rd	Third place
Last	Last place
♦	League top scorer
Italics	Ongoing competition

Key to cup record

- DNE = Did not enter
- DNQ = Did not qualify
- NH = Competition not held or canceled
- QR = Qualifying round
- PR = Preliminary round
- GS = Group stage
- R1 = First round
- R2 = Second round
- R3 = Third round
- R4 = Fourth round
- R5 = Fifth round
- Ro16 = Round of 16
- Ro32 = Round of 32
- QF = Quarterfinals or Conference Semifinals
- SF = Semifinals or Conference Finals
- F = Final
- RU = Runners-up
- W = Winners

== Seasons ==
Results of Seattle Sounders FC league and cup competitions by season
Season	League											Position		Playoffs	USOC	LC	CCC	Other		Average attendance (Note: Average attendance is calculated from league matches only and excludes matches played behind closed doors.)	Top goalscorer(s) (Note: Top goalscorer(s) includes all goals scored in MLS, the MLS Cup Playoffs, U.S. Open Cup, MLS is Back Tournament, Leagues Cup, CONCACAF Champions League, FIFA Club World Cup, and other competitive matches.)	
Season	Div	League	Pld	W	L	D	GF	GA	GD	Pts	PPG	Conf.	Overall	Playoffs	USOC	LC	CCC	Competition	Result	Average attendance	Player(s)	Goals
2009	1	MLS	30	12	7	11	38	29	+9	47	1.57	3rd	4th	QF	W	—	DNQ	—	—	30,943	Fredy Montero	13
2010	1	MLS	30	14	10	6	39	35	+4	48	1.60	4th	6th	QF	W	—	GS	—	—	36,173	Fredy Montero	12
2011	1	MLS	34	18	7	9	56	37	+19	63	1.85	2nd	2nd	QF	W	—	QF	—	—	38,496	Fredy Montero	18
2012	1	MLS	34	15	8	11	51	33	+18	56	1.65	3rd	7th	SF	RU	—	SF	—	—	43,144	Eddie Johnson Fredy Montero	17
2013	1	MLS	34	15	12	7	42	42	0	52	1.53	4th	6th	QF	R3	—	DNQ	—	—	44,038	Eddie Johnson	12
2014	1	MLS	34	20	10	4	65	50	+15	64	1.88	1st	1st	SF	W	—	DNQ	—	—	43,734	Obafemi Martins	19
2015	1	MLS	34	15	13	6	44	36	+8	51	1.50	4th	6th	QF	R4	—	QF	—	—	44,247	Obafemi Martins	15
2016	1	MLS	34	14	14	6	44	43	+1	48	1.41	4th	7th	W	QF	—	DNQ	—	—	42,636	Jordan Morris	12
2017	1	MLS	34	14	9	11	52	39	+13	53	1.56	2nd	7th	RU	Ro16	—	DNQ	—	—	43,666	Clint Dempsey	12
2018	1	MLS	34	18	11	5	52	37	+15	59	1.74	2nd	4th	QF	R4	—	QF	—	—	40,641	Raúl Ruidíaz	13
2019	1	MLS	34	16	10	8	52	49	+3	56	1.65	2nd	4th	W	R4	—	DNQ	—	—	40,247	Raúl Ruidíaz	15
2020 (Note: The 2020 season was shortened due to the COVID-19 pandemic; league standings were determined using points per game due to an uneven number of matches played. The three group stage matches during the MLS is Back Tournament counted towards regular season standings, while knockout stage matches did not.)	1	MLS	22	11	5	6	44	23	+21	39	1.77	2nd	6th	RU	NH (Note: The 2020 and 2021 editions of the U.S. Open Cup were canceled due to the COVID-19 pandemic.)	—	Ro16	Campeones Cup MLS is Back Tournament	NH Ro16	36,603 (Note: Attendance figures for the 2020 season do not reflect matches played without spectators due to the COVID-19 pandemic. The figures were calculated from the two home matches played in March 2020 that drew 40,126 and 33,080 spectators.)	Raúl Ruidíaz	14
2021	1	MLS	34	17	8	9	53	33	+20	60	1.76	2nd	3rd	R1	NH	RU	DNQ	—	—	25,125 (Note: From March to July 2021, seating capacity at Lumen Field was restricted due to the COVID-19 pandemic.)	Raúl Ruidíaz	19
2022	1	MLS	34	12	17	5	47	46	+1	41	1.21	11th	21st	DNQ	Ro32	—	W	—	—	33,607	Nicolás Lodeiro Raúl Ruidíaz	12
2023	1	MLS	34	14	9	11	41	32	+9	53	1.56	2nd	7th	QF	Ro32	GS	DNQ	FIFA Club World Cup	R2	32,161	Jordan Morris	14
2024	1	MLS	34	16	9	9	51	35	+16	57	1.68	4th	7th	SF	SF	QF	DNQ	—	—	30,754	Jordan Morris	13
2025	1	MLS	34	15	9	10	58	48	+10	55	1.62	5th	10th	R1	DNQ	W	Ro16	FIFA Club World Cup	GS	30,993	Danny Musovski	18
2026	1	MLS	34	12	12	10	44	46	−2	46	1.35	8th	15th	TBD	DNQ	GS	QF	—	—	31,936	Albert Rusnák Cristian Roldan Paul Rothrock Dejan Joveljić	5
Total (as of 2026)			592	268	180	144	873	693	+180	948	1.6	W (1)	W (1)	W (2)	W (4)	W (1)	W (1)	—	—	33,265	Jordan Morris	95

== See also ==
- List of Seattle Sounders (1974–1983) seasons
- List of Seattle Sounders (1994–2008) seasons
- List of Tacoma Defiance seasons
