= Jackson Ragen =

American soccer player (born 1998)

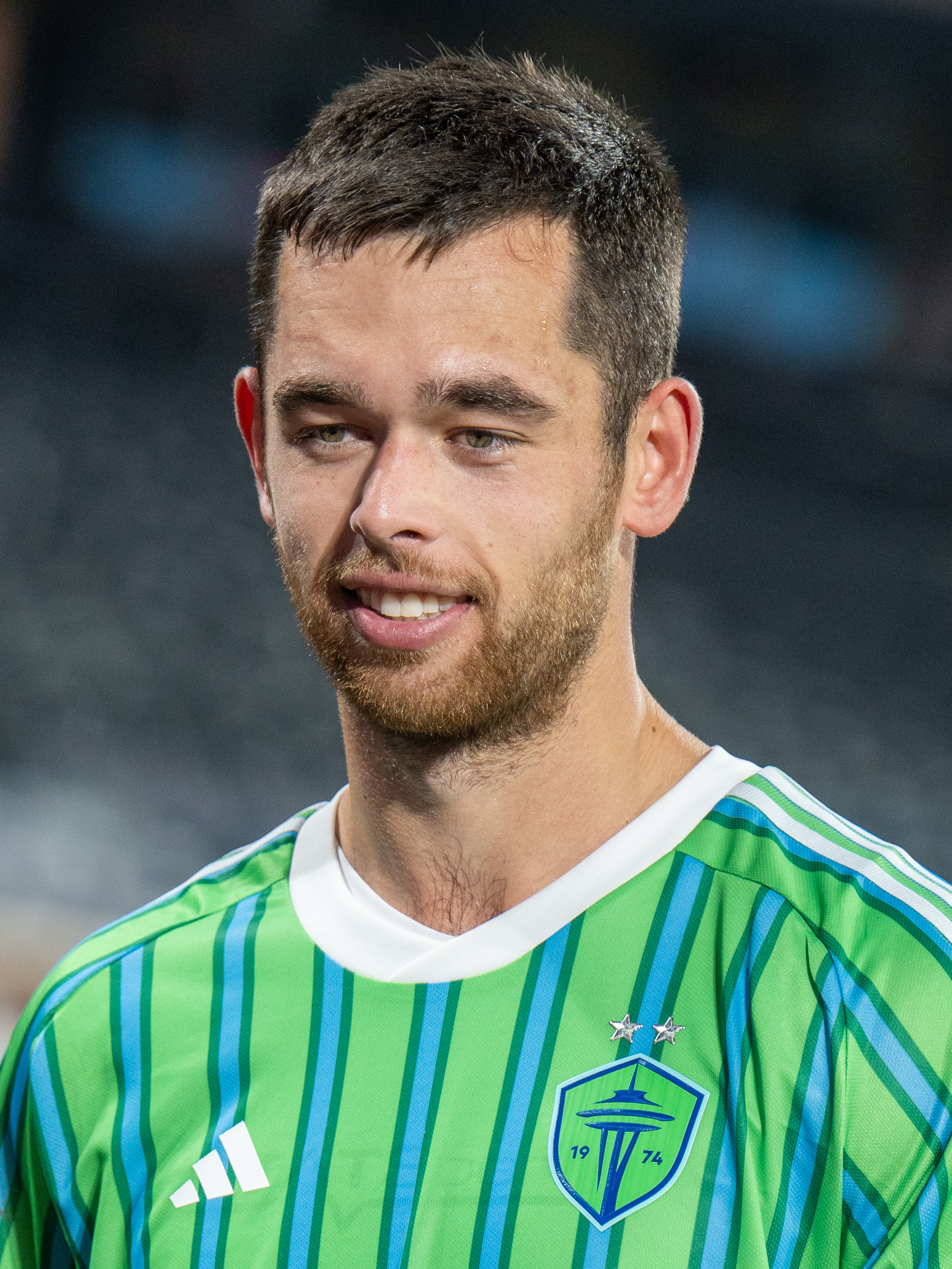
- Ragen with Seattle Sounders FC in 2025

Personal information
- Full name: Jackson Cameron Ragen
- Date of birth: September 24, 1998 (age 28)
- Place of birth: Seattle, Washington, U.S.
- Height: 6 ft 6 in (1.98 m)
- Position: Defender

Team information
- Current team: Seattle Sounders FC
- Number: 25

Youth career
- 2008–2016: Seattle United
- 2016–2017: Seattle Sounders FC (loan)

College career
Years	Team	Apps	(Gls)
2017–2021	Michigan Wolverines	69	(10)

Senior career*
Years	Team	Apps	(Gls)
2017	Seattle Sounders FC 2	3	(0)
2019	OSA FC	2	(0)
2021	Tacoma Defiance	16	(1)
2022–	Seattle Sounders FC	124	(5)
2022	→ Tacoma Defiance (loan)	2	(0)
- * Club domestic league appearances and goals as of March 16, 2025

Jackson Cameron Ragen (born September 24, 1998) is an American professional soccer player who plays as a defender for Major League Soccer club Seattle Sounders FC.

== Career ==
Ragen began his youth career with a neighborhood rec team, where he played with future Sounders teammate Paul Rothrock. Ragen moved to play club soccer with Seattle United from 2008 to 2016. He played high school soccer at University Prep, earning all-state honors as a sophomore and junior before joining the Seattle Sounders FC Academy for one year. On February 3, 2017, it was announced that Ragen signed to play college soccer at the University of Michigan. He made his debut for USL club Seattle Sounders FC 2 in a goalless draw against San Antonio FC. Despite making three appearances for S2, he was still eligible to play in college.

On August 28, 2017, Ragen made his collegiate debut for the Wolverines in a 1–1 draw against Valparaiso. On September 24, he scored his first collegiate goal in a 3–1 victory over Northwestern.

In 2019, Ragen appeared for National Premier Soccer League side OSA FC.

He was drafted in the second round of the 2021 MLS SuperDraft by Chicago Fire FC. Regan opted to remain at college to play out his senior season, which was delayed due to the COVID-19 pandemic.

On April 9, 2021, Ragen was named the Big Ten Conference Men's Soccer Defensive Player of the Year for the 2020 season.

On August 8, 2021, Ragen signed a deal with USL Championship side Tacoma Defiance.

On February 14, 2022, Seattle Sounders FC acquired Ragen's MLS rights from Chicago Fire in exchange for a 3rd round 2023 MLS SuperDraft pick, and signed him to their roster.

== International career ==
In January 2024 he was selected for the senior United States squad for a match against Slovenia, but had to withdraw due to injury.

== Career statistics ==
=== Club ===
As of match played on April 6, 2024

Club statistics
Club	Season	League			National cup (Note: Includes U.S. Open Cup)		Continental (Note: Includes CONCACAF Champions Cup)		Other (Note: Includes MLS Cup playoffs, Leagues Cup)		Total	
Club	Season	Division	Apps	Goals	Apps	Goals	Apps	Goals	Apps	Goals	Apps	Goals
Seattle Sounders 2	2017	USL Championship	3	0	—		—		—		3	0
Tacoma Defiance	2021	USL Championship	16	1	—		—		—		16	1
Seattle Sounders FC	2022	Major League Soccer	23	0	1	0	6	0	—		30	0
Seattle Sounders FC	2023	Major League Soccer	32	0	—		—		7	0	39	0
Seattle Sounders FC	2024	Major League Soccer	33	3	3	0	—		9	1	45	4
Seattle Sounders FC	2025	Major League Soccer	24	2	—		0	0	0	0	0	0
Seattle Sounders FC	2026	Major League Soccer	12	0	—		0	0	0	0	0	0
Total		124	5	4	0	6	0	16	1	114	4	
Tacoma Defiance (loan)	2022	MLS Next Pro	2	0	—		—		—		2	0
Career totals			109	4	4	0	6	0	16	1	135	5

== Honors ==
Seattle Sounders FC

- CONCACAF Champions League: 2022
- Leagues Cup: 2025

Individual

- MLS All-Star: 2026
