= Cody Baker =

American soccer player (born 2004)

Personal information
- Full name: Cody Baker
- Date of birth: January 7, 2004 (age 22)
- Place of birth: Issaquah, Washington, United States
- Height: 5 ft 10 in (1.78 m)
- Position: Defender

Team information
- Current team: New England Revolution
- Number: 15

Youth career
- 2018–2021: Seattle Sounders FC

Senior career*
Years	Team	Apps	(Gls)
2021–	Tacoma Defiance	35	(1)
2023–	Seattle Sounders FC	25	(0)
2025	→ Sacramento Republic FC (loan)	6	(0)
2026–	→ New England Revolution (loan)	0	(0)
- * Club domestic league appearances and goals as of October 30, 2025

Cody Baker (born January 7, 2004) is an American professional soccer player who plays as a center-back or right-back for Major League Soccer club New England Revolution, on loan from Seattle Sounders FC.

== Early life ==
Baker was born in Issaquah, Washington.

== Club career ==
Baker joined the youth academy of Major League Soccer club Seattle Sounders FC in 2018. While in the academy, Baker began as a center-back before converting to right-back. In March 2021, Baker was named by Sounders FC head coach Brian Schmetzer as one of the academy players who could be called up to the first team: "I would say that Cody Baker is another one on my list. He’s been a surprise. He might not quite be ready, but he’s going to be ready".

On May 13, 2021, Baker made his professional debut for Sounders FC's USL Championship affiliate Tacoma Defiance against San Diego Loyal, coming on as a 79th-minute substitute in a 3–1 victory.

On July 21, 2021, Baker signed a professional contract with Tacoma.

=== Seattle Sounders FC ===
He was among four Tacoma players called up by Seattle Sounders FC for a 2023 U.S. Open Cup match against San Diego Loyal SC on April 26, 2023. Baker played the entire match and provided an assist to fellow Tacoma signing Paul Rothrock for a goal in the 55th minute. He signed a short-term agreement with the Sounders the following month and made his MLS debut as a substitute against Sporting Kansas City on May 7. Baker earned his first MLS start the following week against the Houston Dynamo and signed a four-year Homegrown Player contract with the Sounders on May 16.

On September 8, 2025, Baker was loaned to USL Championship club Sacramento Republic FC for the rest of the season. The Sounders stated that the loan was meant to provide more playing time. He was loaned to the New England Revolution on July 15, 2026, for the remainder of the 2026 season in exchange for a 2027 MLS SuperDraft first-round pick.

== Career statistics ==
=== Club ===
As of match played November 8, 2021

Appearances and goals by club, season and competition
Club	Season	League			National cup		Continental		Other		Total	
Club	Season	Division	Apps	Goals	Apps	Goals	Apps	Goals	Apps	Goals	Apps	Goals
Tacoma Defiance	2021	USL Championship	18	0	—		—		—		18	0
Career total			18	0	0	0	0	0	0	0	18	0
