= Kalani Kossa-Rienzi =

American soccer player (born 2002)

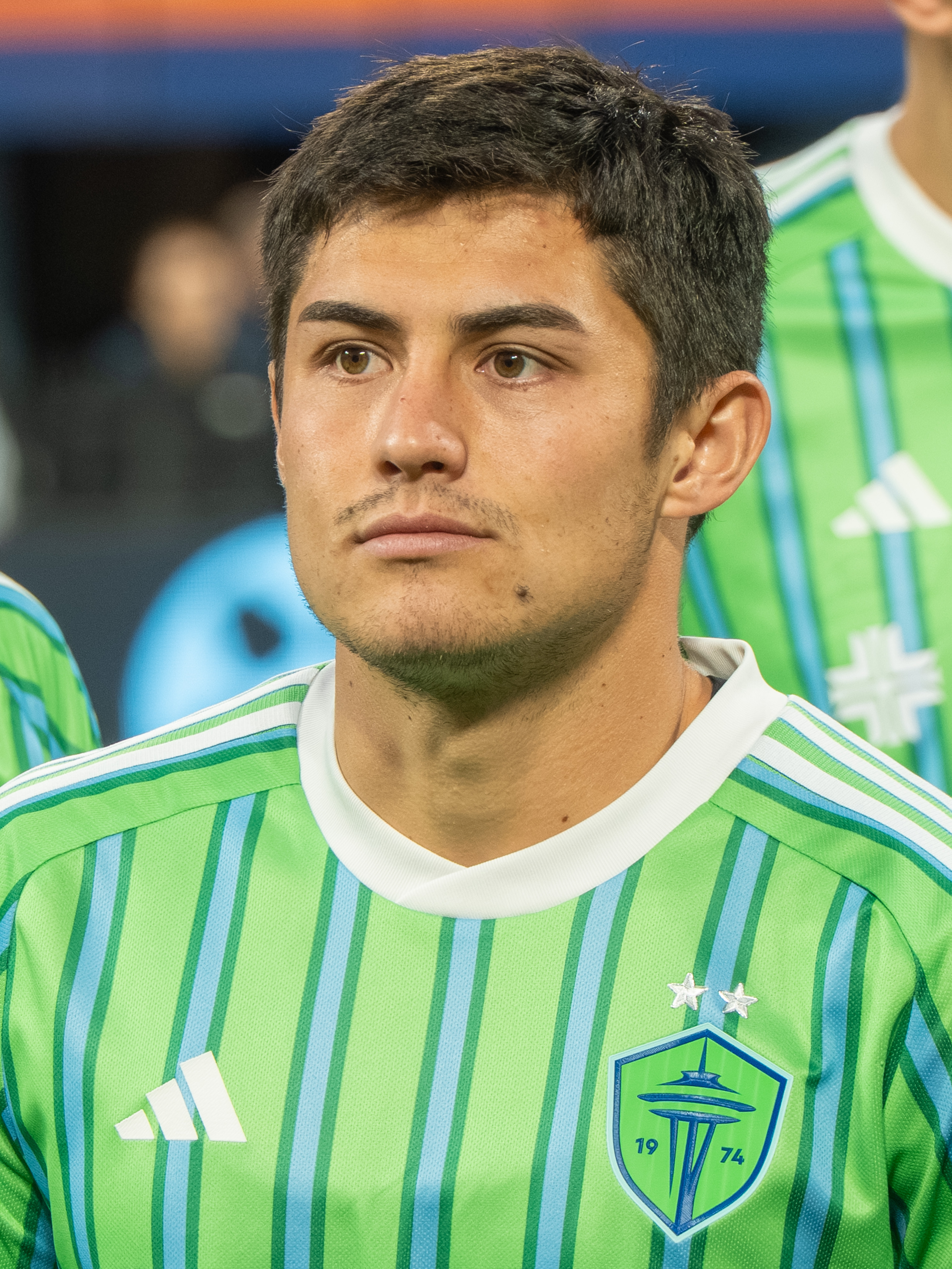
- Kossa-Rienzi with the Seattle Sounders in 2025

Personal information
- Date of birth: June 27, 2002 (age 24)
- Place of birth: Berkeley, California, United States
- Height: 5 ft 7 in (1.70 m)
- Positions: Midfielder; defender

Team information
- Current team: Seattle Sounders FC
- Number: 85

Youth career
- Mavericks SC

College career
Years	Team	Apps	(Gls)
2020–2023	Washington Huskies	76	(6)

Senior career*
Years	Team	Apps	(Gls)
2023	Crossfire Red	4	(5)
2024–2025	Tacoma Defiance	25	(0)
2024–2025	→ Seattle Sounders FC (loan)	3	(1)
2025–	Seattle Sounders FC	34	(4)
- * Club domestic league appearances and goals as of March 8, 2025

Kalani Kossa-Rienzi (born June 27, 2002) is an American soccer player who plays for Seattle Sounders FC in Major League Soccer.

== Early life ==
Kossa-Rienzi played youth soccer with Mavericks SC. He attended Berkeley High School, where he was named the WACC-Foothill Player of the Year, the North Coast Section Player of the Year, an All-USA Second Team selection, and an All-American, as a junior. Kossa-Rienzi is of Chinese and Canadian descent.

== College career ==
In 2020, Kossa-Rienzi began attending the University of Washington, where he played for the men's soccer team. He recorded an assist in his collegiate debut on February 4, 2021, against the Northwest Eagles. On September 24, 2021, he scored his first collegiate goal in a 2–0 victory over the Portland Pilots. At the end of his sophomore season, he was named an All-Pac 12 Honorable Mention. In 2022, he was named to the All-Pac 12 First Team and the All-Far West Region Second Team. Ahead of his senior season, he was named to the Pac-12 All-Preseason Team. At the end of the season, he was named to the All-Pac 12 First Team and the All West Region Second Team. He was also invited to the MLS College Showcase. Over his four seasons, he scored six goals and added 11 assists in 76 appearances.

== Club career ==
In 2023, Kossa-Rienzi played with the Crossfire Red in the National Premier Soccer League.

At the 2024 MLS SuperDraft, Kossa-Rienzi was selected in the first round (23rd overall) by the Seattle Sounders FC. After participating in pre-season with the first team, he signed a contract with their second team, Tacoma Defiance, in MLS Next Pro in March 2024. During the 2024 season, he went on short-term loans with the Seattle Sounders first team, making his first start on May 22 in a U.S. Open Cup match against Phoenix Rising FC in which he scored his first goal for the club, which was the winning goal in a 2–1 victory to help the club advance to the quarter-finals. In March 2025, he signed additional short-term loans with the first team. On March 8, 2025, he scored his first MLS goal in a victory over Los Angeles FC. On March 10, 2025, he signed an MLS contract with the first team for the remainder of the season, with options for 2026 and 2027.

== Career statistics ==
As of March 8, 2025

Club	Season	League			Playoffs		National cup		Other		Total	
Club	Season	Division	Apps	Goals	Apps	Goals	Apps	Goals	Apps	Goals	Apps	Goals
Crossfire Red	2023	National Premier Soccer League	4	5	3	3	1	0	–		8	8
Tacoma Defiance	2024	MLS Next Pro	25	0	2	0	–		–		27	0
Seattle Sounders FC (loan)	2024	Major League Soccer	1	0	0	0	2	1	0	0	3	1
Seattle Sounders FC (loan)	2025	Major League Soccer	2	1	0	0	0	0	0	0	2	1
Seattle Sounders FC (loan)	Total		3	0	0	0	3	1	0	0	5	1
Career total			32	6	5	3	3	1	0	0	38	10
