= Peter Kingston (soccer) =

American soccer player (born 2001)

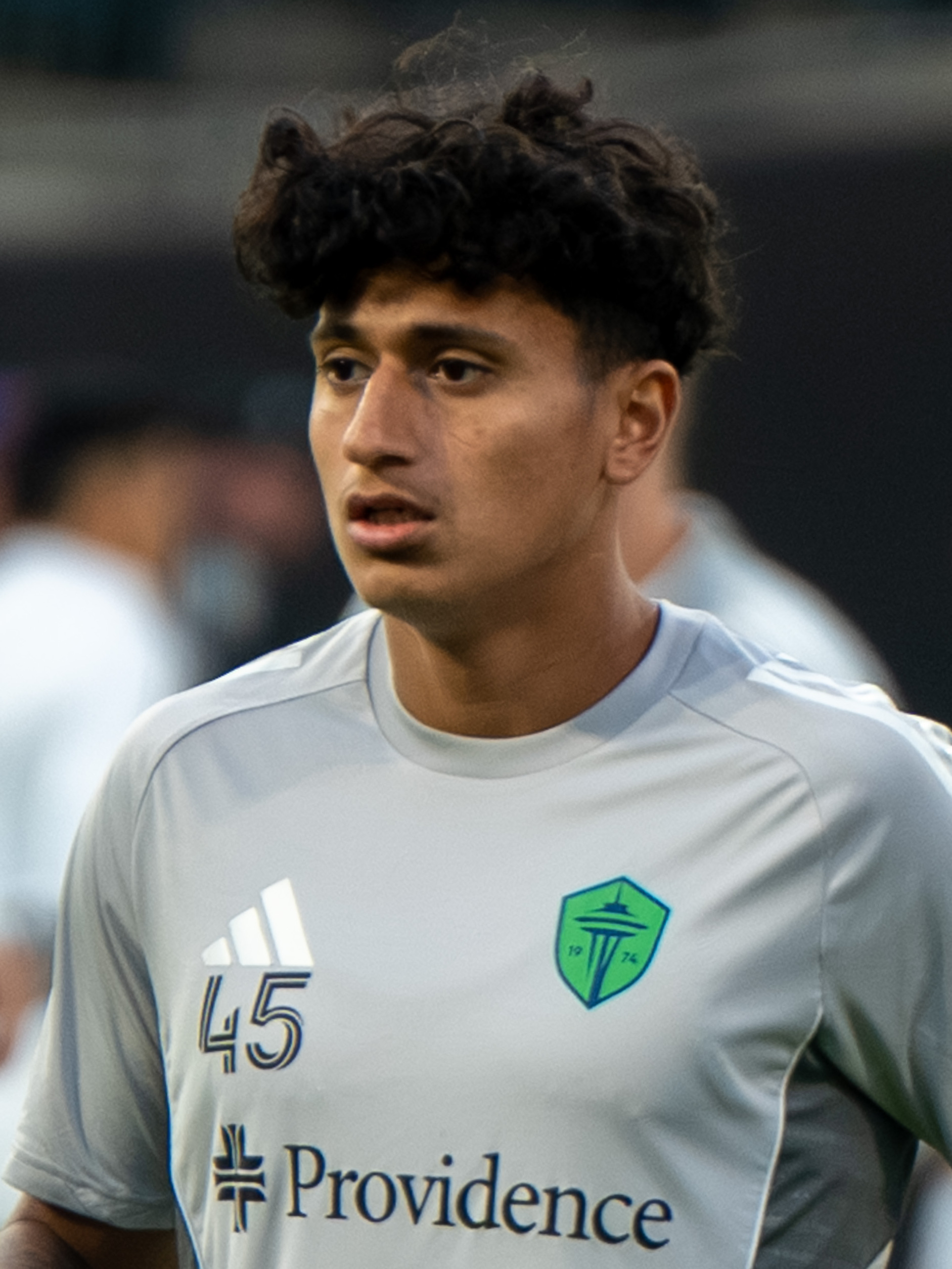
- Kingston with the Seattle Sounders in 2025

Personal information
- Date of birth: July 14, 2001 (age 25)
- Place of birth: Kirkland, Washington, United States
- Height: 5 ft 10 in (1.78 m)
- Position: Midfielder

Team information
- Current team: Seattle Sounders FC
- Number: 45

Youth career
- 2014–2019: Seattle Sounders FC

College career
Years	Team	Apps	(Gls)
2020–2023	Seattle Redhawks	42	(0)
2024	Washington Huskies	21	(6)

Senior career*
Years	Team	Apps	(Gls)
2018–2019	Tacoma Defiance	5	(0)
2022–2024	Ballard FC	11	(1)
2025–2026	Tacoma Defiance	30	(2)
2025–	Seattle Sounders FC	3	(0)
- * Club domestic league appearances and goals as of May 12, 2023

Peter Kingston (born July 14, 2001) is an American professional soccer player who plays for Major League Soccer club Seattle Sounders FC.

== Career ==
Kingston joined the Seattle Sounders FC academy in 2015. He made his debut for USL club Seattle Sounders FC 2 in August 2018.

In 2020, Kingston attended Seattle University to play college soccer.

After featuring for the inaugural Ballard FC roster during the 2022 USL League Two season, Kingston returned to the club for the 2023 season. He scored the winning goal for Ballard FC in the USL League Two Championship, which was played in Tukwila, Washington. Kingston returned for a third season with Ballard FC in 2024 and moved into the center midfield.

He was signed by the Tacoma Defiance, the reserve team for the Sounders in MLS Next Pro, on March 3, 2025. Kingston was called up to the Sounders as an emergency signing in October 2025 and made his Major League Soccer debut against Real Salt Lake, playing the final ten minutes of a 1–0 victory at Lumen Field.

On April 3, 2026, Kingston signed with Seattle Sounders FC until the end of the 2026 season, with club options through the 2027–28 MLS season.
