= One-day contract =

Type of professional sports contract

In major professional sports leagues in the United States and Canada, a one-day contract is an employment contract between a team and a former player who is about to retire and out of contract, in which the player symbolically rejoins the team for one day. The one-day contract provides a formal occasion for the player to announce their retirement and exchange thanks with teammates, management, and fans. The player signs the contract in public, typically at a press conference. It is most associated with the National Football League, and with players who spent the bulk and most successful part of their career with one team, before transferring elsewhere near its end; in such cases, the one-day contract allows players to finish their career back at the team with which they were most associated.

An early example of a one-day contract was signed on August 24, 2006, by Jerry Rice with the San Francisco 49ers, his team from 1985 to 2000. The contract was for a symbolic amount of $1,985,806.49, which Rice did not collect. The figure combined his debut season (1985), jersey number (80), retirement year (2006), and team (49ers). When Tom Brady announced his retirement in February 2023, Robert Kraft, owner of the New England Patriots for whom Brady played from 2000 to 2020, hoped to offer him a one-day contract. Although Brady was honored in Boston with a halftime ceremony in September 2023 and Patriots Hall of Fame induction in June 2024, he signed no one-day contract; media speculated that the omission might be due to ill feeling from his 2020 departure, or a lingering hope to un-retire.
