= Sebastian Gomez (soccer, born 2006) =

American soccer player (born 2006)

Personal information
- Full name: Sebastian Sol de Mayo Gomez
- Date of birth: May 21, 2006 (age 20)
- Place of birth: Boca Raton, Florida, United States
- Height: 5 ft 8 in (1.73 m)
- Position: Attacking midfielder

Team information
- Current team: Seattle Sounders FC
- Number: 90

Youth career
- –2019: Seattle Celtic
- 2019–2020: Seattle United
- 2020–2024: Seattle Sounders FC

Senior career*
Years	Team	Apps	(Gls)
2023–2026	Tacoma Defiance	62	(9)
2026–	Seattle Sounders FC	21	(4)

International career
2020	United States U14		
2026–	United States U23		
- * Club domestic league appearances and goals as of 22:39, 19 November 2026

Sebastian Sol de Mayo Gomez (born May 21, 2006) is an American soccer player who plays as an attacking midfielder for Seattle Sounders FC in Major League Soccer.

== Club career ==
=== Youth ===
Gomez began his youth career at local club Seattle Celtic as a seven year old before joining Seattle Sounders FC Academy in 2020.

In July 2022 he was awarded the MLS Next Goal of the Year award.

=== Tacoma Defiance ===
After impressing for the Sounders under-17 team, Gomez was called up to the Tacoma Defiance squad at the beginning of the 2023 season. He made his first appearance in a pre-season game against Whitecaps FC 2 on March 10, and his MLS Next Pro début two weeks later at St. Louis City coming on as a substitute for Braudílio Rodrigues. On April 23, Gomez made his first start, against Houston Dynamo 2 at SaberCats Stadium. He registered his first assist against Minnesota United FC 2.

It was announced Gomez officially signed with Tacoma on February 27, 2024. He made his first appearance of the season against Colorado Rapids 2, recording an assist for Faysal Bettache with an adroit dummy. He contributed a goal and assist as Defiance beat Ventura County to progress in MLS Next Pro playoffs.

In January 2025, Gomez travelled with the Seattle Sounders FC first team for their pre-season tour of Marbella, starting the team's first friendly against Puskás Akadémia. On March 21 he made his US Open Cup début, providing an assist for Yu Tsukanome in the 48th minute. He scored his first hat-trick against Ventura County on August 8, finishing the season with 5 goals and 7 assists in all competitions.

On October 11, he was called up to the Sounders first team squad for a match against Real Salt Lake but did not make an appearance from the bench.

=== Seattle Sounders FC ===
On January 13, 2026, it was announced Gomez signed a first team contract until 2029. He started the club’s first pre-season match, a 2-0 loss to Brøndby at Estádio Algarve. He made his MLS début on May 26 at Lumen Field in a 2-0 defeat against LA Galaxy and his first senior start on August 9th in a Leagues Cup match at home to Liga MX side Querétaro, providing a goal and an assist earning him the Man of the Match award.

== International career ==
Gomez was born in Florida to a Canadian mother and Nicaraguan father. In 2020 he was called up to the United States U14 squad but did not make an appearance due to the COVID-19 pandemic. In a 2024 article, La Prensa stated that Gomez would consider representing Nicaragua and wanted to keep his options open. He is also eligible to represent Canada and the United States. In September 2026 La Prensa reported Nicaragua head coach Juan Cruz Real had made contact with Gomez regarding his selection for the upcoming CONCACAF Nations League fixtures against Curaçao, Costa Rica, and The Dominican Republic respectively.

In November 2026 Gomez was named in Steve Cherundolo's United States U23 Squad for their training camp in Spain.

== Style of play ==
Gomez is an advanced playmaker and is most effectively deployed as a Number 10. He is known for his intelligence, touch, and creativity and stated he wanted to entertain.

== Career statistics ==
As of matches played November 19, 2026

Appearances and goals by club, season and competition
Club	Season	League			National Cup (Note: Includes appearances in the U.S. Open Cup)		Continental		Other		Total	
Club	Season	Division	Apps	Goals	Apps	Goals	Apps	Goals	Apps	Goals	Apps	Goals
Tacoma Defiance	2023	MLS Next Pro	7	0	0	0	0	0	0	0	7	0
Tacoma Defiance	2024	MLS Next Pro	18	4	0	0	0	0	2 (Note: Appearances in the MLS Next Pro playoffs)	1	20	5
Tacoma Defiance	2025	MLS Next Pro	28	5	4	0	0	0	0	0	32	5
Tacoma Defiance	Total		52	9	4	0	0	0	2	1	58	10
Seattle Sounders FC	2025	Major League Soccer	0	0	0	0	0	0	0	0	0	0
Seattle Sounders FC	2026	Major League Soccer	21	4	0	0	0	0	4 (Note: Three appearances in the Leagues Cup and one appearance in the MLS Cup Playoffs)	1	25	5
Seattle Sounders FC	Career total		75	13	4	0	0	0	6	2	84	15

== Honours ==
Seattle Sounders FC Academy

- 2022 Generation Adidas Cup.

Individual

- MLS Next Goal of the Week. March 18, 2022.
- MLS Next Goal of the Year 2022 Presented by Allstate.
