= Stuart Hawkins =

American soccer player (born 2006)

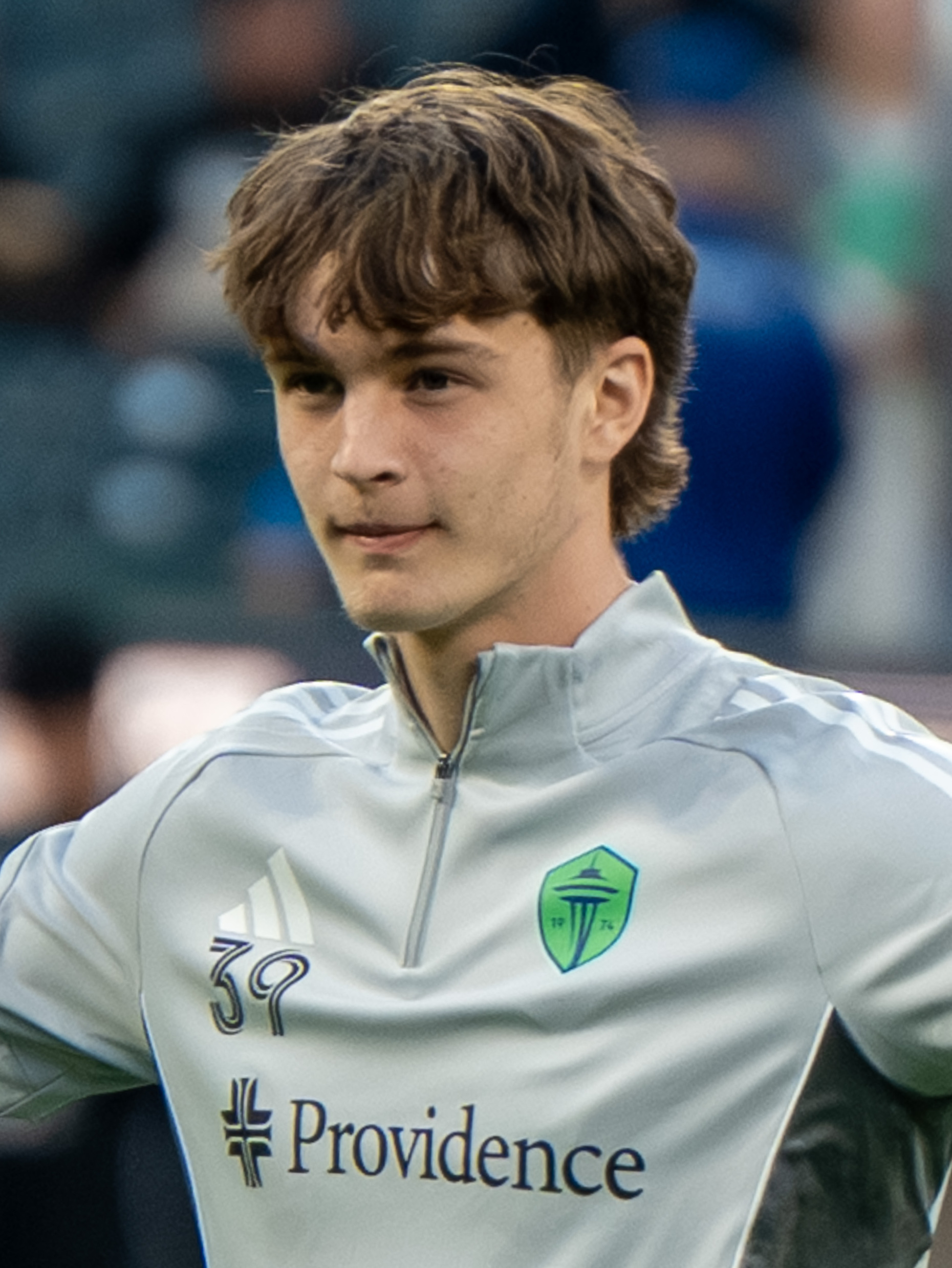
- Hawkins with the Seattle Sounders in 2025

Personal information
- Full name: Stuart Russell Hawkins
- Date of birth: September 18, 2006 (age 20)
- Place of birth: Gig Harbor, Fox Island, Washington, United States
- Height: 1.90 m (6 ft 3 in)
- Position: Center-back

Team information
- Current team: Seattle Sounders
- Number: 39

Youth career
- 2018–2022: Seattle Sounders

Senior career*
Years	Team	Apps	(Gls)
2022–	Tacoma Defiance	55	(3)
2024–	Seattle Sounders	11	(1)

International career^{‡}
2022–2023	United States U17	20	(0)
2024	United States U19	3	(0)
2024–	United States U20	5	(0)
- * Club domestic league appearances and goals as of 19:29, September 2, 2025 (UTC) ‡ National team caps and goals as of November 15, 2025

Stuart Russell Hawkins (born September 18, 2006) is an American professional soccer player who plays as a center-back for Major League Soccer team Seattle Sounders.

== Club career ==
Hawkins Started at Harbor Premier before playing at PAC NW, before joining Washington Premier before finally joining the youth academy of Seattle Sounders FC at the age of 12. On June 23, 2022, he signed a MLS Next Pro contract with their affiliate club Tacoma Defiance. On September 14, 2023, he signed his first professional contract with Seattle Sounders FC until 2026, with options to extend for 2027 and 2028 as a Homegrown Player.

Hawkins made his senior and professional debut for Seattle Sounders FC in a U.S. Open Cup penalty shootout win over Louisville City FC on May 9, 2024.

== International career ==
Hawkins was called up to the United States U17s for the 2023 FIFA U-17 World Cup. He played for the United States U20s at the 2024 CONCACAF U-20 Championship.

== Honors ==
Seattle Sounders

- Leagues Cup: 2025 Leagues Cup
