= 2027 MLS SuperDraft =

College draft for soccer teams

2026 MLS SuperDraft

General information
- Sport: Soccer
- Date: December 21, 2026
- Network: MLS Season Pass

Overview
- 90 total selections in 3 rounds
- League: Major League Soccer
- Teams: 30

The 2026 MLS SuperDraft is the upcoming 27th edition of the MLS SuperDraft, a sports draft to select amateur, usually collegiate, soccer players that are not affiliated with an MLS club, or college soccer players that had their homegrown player rights relinquished by their parent MLS club. The draft will be held on December 21, 2026, marking the fifth year in a row that the draft was held in December. Despite the draft being held in 2026, the draft retained the 2027 branding.

== Format ==
Historically, the MLS SuperDraft has closely resembled that of the NFL draft:

1. Any expansion teams receive the first picks. There are no expansion teams this year, so the last-place MLS team will receive the first pick
2. Non-playoff clubs receive the next picks in reverse order of prior season finish.
3. Teams that made the MLS Cup playoffs are then ordered by which round of the playoffs they are eliminated.
4. The winners of the MLS Cup are given the last selection, and the losers the penultimate selection.

== Player selection ==
Player key
*	Denotes player who has been selected for an MLS Best XI team						
^	Member of 2026 Generation Adidas class						
†	Player who was named to an MLS Best XI and Generation Adidas						
Signed key
11	Denotes player who signed for a MLS team (Division I)						
3	Denotes player who signed for a USL Championship team (Division II)						
34	Denotes player who signed for a MLS Next Pro, USL League One or NISA team (Division III)						
0	Denotes player who signed for a team outside the United States soccer league system						
22	Denotes player who returned to college team						
Positions key
GK	Goalkeeper	DF	Defender	MF	Midfielder	FW	Forward

=== First round ===
P	MLS team	Player	Year	Pos.	College	Conference	Academy team(s)	Other team(s)	Signed
1	CF Montréal								
2	Sporting Kansas City								
3	D.C. United								
4	Atlanta United								
5	Austin FC								
6	San Diego FC								
7	Toronto FC								
8	New York City FC								
9	New York Red Bulls								
10	Colorado Rapids								
11	LA Galaxy								
12	Minnesota United FC								
13									
14									
15									
16									
17									
18									
19									
20									
21									
22									
23									
24									
25									
26									
27									
28									
29									
30									
