= Paul Rothrock =

American soccer player (born 1999)

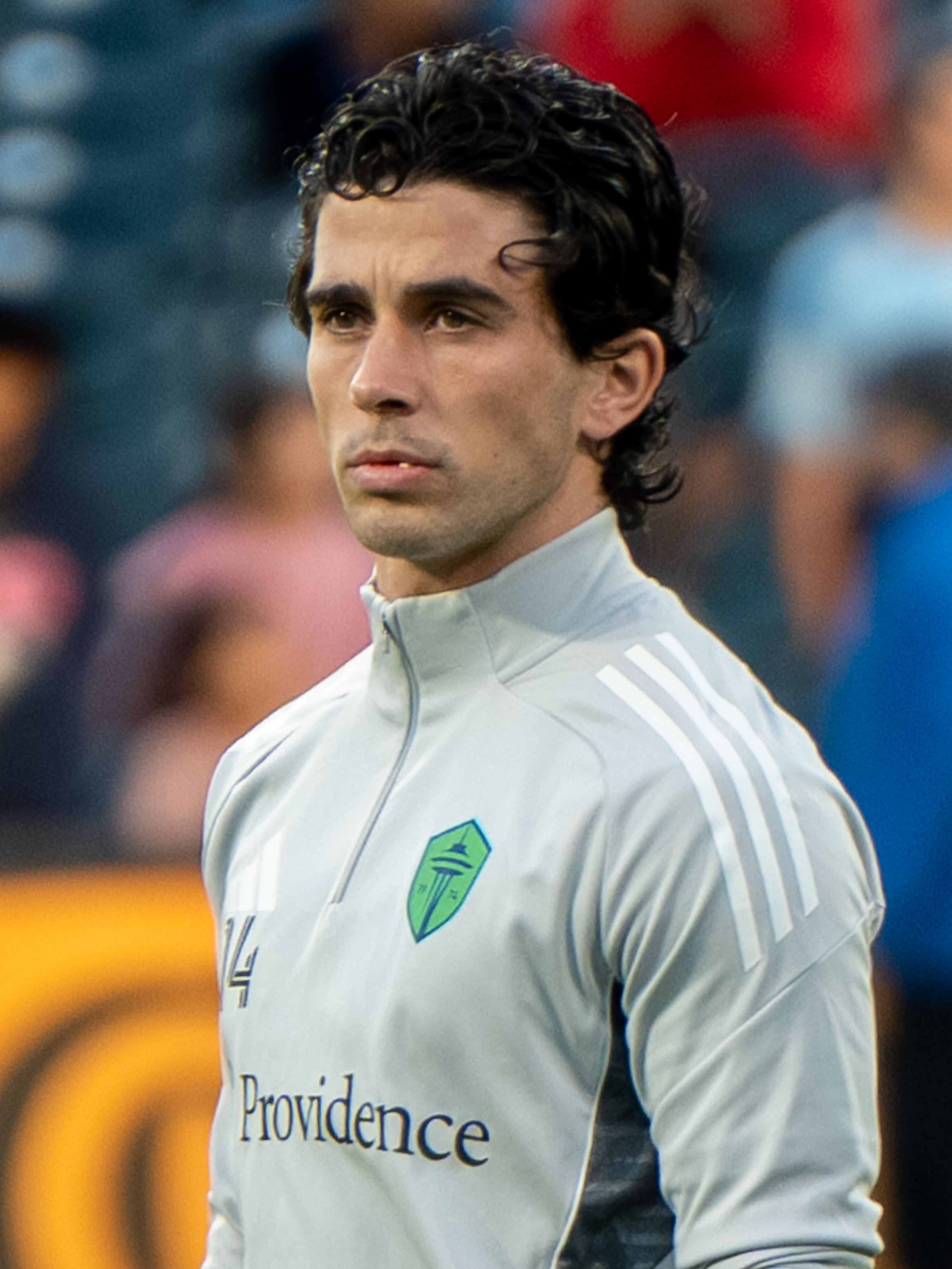
- Rothrock with the Seattle Sounders in 2025

Personal information
- Date of birth: January 9, 1999 (age 27)
- Place of birth: Seattle, Washington, U.S.
- Height: 1.75 m (5 ft 9 in)
- Positions: Midfielder; forward

Team information
- Current team: Seattle Sounders FC
- Number: 14

Youth career
- 2014–2016: Seattle United
- 2016–2017: Seattle Sounders FC

College career
Years	Team	Apps	(Gls)
2017–2018	Notre Dame Fighting Irish	13	(1)
2019–2020	Georgetown Hoyas	36	(6)

Senior career*
Years	Team	Apps	(Gls)
2017	Seattle Sounders FC 2	1	(1)
2019	OSA Seattle FC	3	(0)
2021–2022	Toronto FC II	29	(11)
2022	→ Toronto FC (loan)	2	(0)
2023	Tacoma Defiance	18	(3)
2023	→ Seattle Sounders FC (loan)	1	(1)
2023–	Seattle Sounders FC	75	(14)
2023–2024	→ Tacoma Defiance (loan)	5	(5)

International career
2017	United States U18	1	(0)
- * Club domestic league appearances and goals as of March 16, 2026

Paul Rothrock (born January 9, 1999) is an American professional soccer player who plays for Major League Soccer club Seattle Sounders FC. He was part of the Sounders academy system as a youth player and played college soccer for the Notre Dame Fighting Irish and Georgetown Hoyas. Rothrock was drafted by Toronto FC in 2021 and played for their reserve team Toronto FC II for two seasons before transferring to the Tacoma Defiance, the reserve squad of the Sounders, in 2023.

== Early life ==
Born and raised in Seattle's Capitol Hill neighborhood, Rothrock spent most of his youth career with Seattle United, a partner club of the Seattle Sounders Academy, leading them to two Washington State Cup titles, two Far West Regional titles, and two appearances in the U.S. Youth Soccer national finals. In his U18 season, he joined the Sounders Academy, helping the squad to a third-place finish in the USSDA National Playoffs.

Rothrock attended Lakeside School in Seattle, where he was a two-time all-state player and tallied 43 career assists. He spent several years playing with future Sounders teammate Jackson Ragen, who he had met at age seven while playing for a neighborhood rec soccer team.

== College career ==
On February 2, 2017, it was announced that Rothrock signed a letter of intent to play college soccer at the University of Notre Dame. He did not play for the Fighting Irish during his freshman season and had few appearances in his sophomore year.

After the 2018 NCAA Division I men's soccer season, Rothrock transferred to Georgetown. He had his first assist for Georgetown on August 30, 2019, in a 3–1 victory against Syracuse. He scored his first goal in a 5–1 win against UCLA on September 9, 2019. After his senior season in 2020–21 was cancelled due to the COVID-19 pandemic, he decided to turn professional.

== Club career ==
He made his debut for USL club Seattle Sounders FC 2 on July 8, 2017, and scored his first goal in a 4–1 defeat to Real Monarchs. During his 2019 collegiate season, Rothrock played with National Premier Soccer League side OSA Seattle FC, making 3 appearances.

He was drafted in the third round of the 2021 MLS SuperDraft by Toronto FC. On May 18, he signed with their second team, Toronto FC II of USL League One. He made his debut for TFCII on May 26 against FC Tucson. He scored his first goal on October 1 against North Carolina FC. On October 17, he scored a brace in a 2–1 victory against Chattanooga Red Wolves SC. On May 4, 2022, he signed a short-term four-day loan with the first team, Toronto FC, ahead of their Major League Soccer match against the FC Cincinnati. He signed an additional four-day loan on May 7. He made his MLS debut on May 8, as a late game substitute. He signed another short-term loan on May 14.

In January 2023, he signed with the Tacoma Defiance (the successor to Seattle Sounders FC 2) in MLS Next Pro. Through his first three games, he assisted four of the team's six goals. He scored his first goal on April 30 against LA Galaxy II. On April 26, 2023, he joined the first team, Seattle Sounders FC, on a short-term loan for their U.S. Open Cup match, scoring on his club debut. In May, he signed a second short-term loan with the club, where he again scored in another Open Cup match on May 10 against the LA Galaxy. He then made his league debut for the club on May 13, where he scored his first MLS goal in a 1–0 victory over the Houston Dynamo. He became the first Sounders player to score in each of his first three appearances, as well as the first player to score while on a short-term loan. In August 2023, he signed a first team contract with the club for the remainder of the 2023 season, with club options for 2024 and 2025. At the time of his signing, he had been leading Tacoma in goals and assists throughout the 2023 season.

== International career ==
In 2017, he was called up to a national team camp for the United States U18 team, making one appearance for them.

== Personal life ==
Rothrock lives on a houseboat on Seattle's Portage Bay. He has four sisters, including a twin.

== Career statistics ==
As of match played on September 18, 2024

Club	Season	League			Playoffs		National cup		Other		Total	
Club	Season	Division	Apps	Goals	Apps	Goals	Apps	Goals	Apps	Goals	Apps	Goals
Seattle Sounders FC 2	2017	USL	1	1	—		—		—		1	1
OSA Seattle FC	2019	NPSL	3	0	0	0	—		—		3	0
Toronto FC II	2021	USL League One	12	4	—		—		—		12	4
Toronto FC II	2022	MLS Next Pro	17	7	2	1	—		—		19	8
Toronto FC II	Total		29	11	2	1	0	0	0	0	31	12
Toronto FC (loan)	2022	Major League Soccer	2	0	—		0	0	—		2	0
Tacoma Defiance	2023	MLS Next Pro	21	7	0	0	—		—		21	7
Seattle Sounders FC (loan)	2023	Major League Soccer	1	1	0	0	2	2	0	0	3	3
Seattle Sounders FC	2023	Major League Soccer	3	0	0	0	0	0	0	0	3	0
Seattle Sounders FC	2024	Major League Soccer	21	3	0	0	4	1	5	2	30	6
Seattle Sounders FC	Total		25	4	0	0	6	3	5	2	36	9
Tacoma Defiance (loan)	2024	MLS Next Pro	2	1	0	0	—		—		2	1
Career total			83	24	2	1	6	3	5	2	96	30

== Honors ==
Seattle Sounders FC

- Leagues Cup: 2025
