= Jimmy Medranda =

Colombian footballer (born 1994)

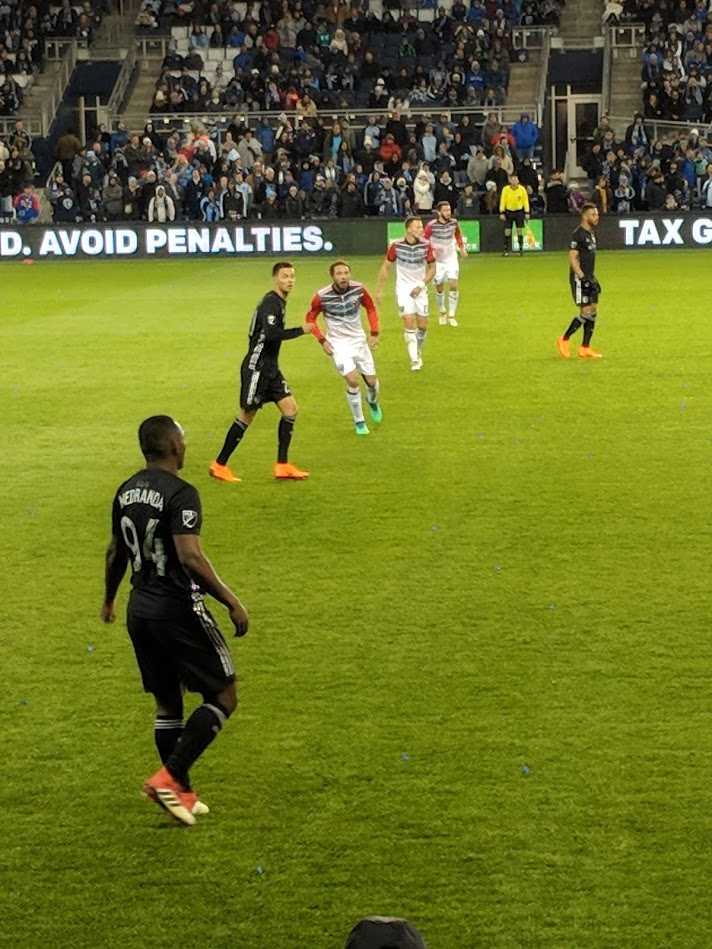
- Jimmy Medranda (foreground) playing against DC United in 2018

Personal information
- Full name: Jimmy Gerardo Medranda Obando
- Date of birth: February 7, 1994 (age 32)
- Place of birth: Mosquera, Colombia
- Height: 5 ft 5 in (1.65 m)
- Positions: Full back; midfielder

Youth career
- 2006–2012: Deportivo Pereira

Senior career*
| Years | Team | Apps | (Gls) |
| 2012–2013 | Deportivo Pereira | 9 | (1) |
| 2013 | → Sporting Kansas City (loan) | 1 | (0) |
| 2014–2019 | Sporting Kansas City | 95 | (5) |
| 2014 | → Oklahoma City Energy (loan) | 9 | (0) |
| 2016–2019 | → Swope Park Rangers | 4 | (0) |
| 2020 | Nashville SC | 1 | (0) |
| 2020–2022 | Seattle Sounders FC | 48 | (4) |
| 2021–2022 | → Tacoma Defiance | 2 | (0) |
| 2023 | Columbus Crew | 10 | (1) |
| 2023 | Columbus Crew 2 | 1 | (0) |
| 2024 | Deportivo Cali | 1 | (0) |
| 2025 | San Antonio FC | 25 | (2) |
- * Club domestic league appearances and goals as of 13:20, 31 October 2025 (UTC)

Jimmy Gerardo Medranda Obando (born February 7, 1994) is a Colombian professional footballer who plays as a defender or midfielder.

== Career ==
=== Deportivo Pereira ===
Medranda joined the youth program of Colombian club Deportivo Pereira at the age of 12 before eventually earning promotion to the first team at the age of 18. He made two league appearances in Categoría Primera B during the 2012 season in addition to a Copa Colombia appearance.

In 2013, he made seven league appearances, including four starts, and scored one goal in addition to six Copa Colombia appearances.

=== Sporting Kansas City ===
In August 2013, Medranda was loaned to Sporting Kansas City in Major League Soccer. He made his debut with Sporting in a September 3–0 victory over the Columbus Crew.

Sporting made the transfer permanent ahead of the 2014 season.

On November 19, 2019, Medranda was selected by Nashville SC in the 2019 MLS Expansion Draft.

=== Nashville SC ===
Medranda made one appearance with Nashville SC.

=== Seattle Sounders FC ===
On 21 October 2020, Medranda was traded to Seattle Sounders FC, along with $225,000 in General Allocation Money, for Handwalla Bwana.

=== Columbus Crew ===
On 23 December 2022, the Columbus Crew announced they had signed Medranda as a free agent.

=== Deportivo Cali ===
On August 14, 2024, it was announced that Medranda had signed with the club.

=== San Antonio FC ===
On 31 January 2025, it was announced that Medranda signed with San Antonio FC.

== Career statistics ==
=== Club ===
As of match played 24 February 2023

Appearances and goals by club, season and competition
| Club | Season | League | | | National cup | | Continental | | Other | | Total | |
| Club | Season | Division | Apps | Goals | Apps | Goals | Apps | Goals | Apps | Goals | Apps | Goals |
|---|---|---|---|---|---|---|---|---|---|---|---|---|
| Deportivo Pereira | 2012 | Primera B | 2 | 0 | 1 | 0 | — | | — | | 3 | 0 |
| Deportivo Pereira | 2013 | Primera B | 7 | 1 | 6 | 1 | — | | — | | 13 | 2 |
| Deportivo Pereira | Total | | 9 | 1 | 7 | 1 | 0 | 0 | 0 | 0 | 16 | 2 |
| Sporting Kansas City (loan) | 2013 | MLS | 1 | 0 | 0 | 0 | — | | — | | 1 | 0 |
| Sporting Kansas City | 2014 | MLS | 5 | 0 | 0 | 0 | 1 (Note: Appearance(s) in CONCACAF Champions League) | 0 | — | | 6 | 0 |
| Sporting Kansas City | 2015 | MLS | 7 | 0 | 0 | 0 | 0 | 0 | — | | 7 | 0 |
| Sporting Kansas City | 2016 | MLS | 28 | 1 | 2 | 0 | 1 | 0 | 1 (Note: Appearance(s) in MLS Cup Playoffs) | 0 | 32 | 1 |
| Sporting Kansas City | 2017 | MLS | 33 | 2 | 5 | 0 | — | | 1 | 0 | 39 | 2 |
| Sporting Kansas City | 2018 | MLS | 12 | 2 | 0 | 0 | — | | — | | 12 | 2 |
| Sporting Kansas City | 2019 | MLS | 10 | 0 | 1 | 0 | — | | — | | 11 | 0 |
| Sporting Kansas City | Total | | 96 | 5 | 8 | 0 | 2 | 0 | 2 | 0 | 108 | 5 |
| Oklahoma City Energy (loan) | 2014 | USL | 9 | 0 | 0 | 0 | — | | — | | 9 | 0 |
| Swope Park Rangers (loan) | 2016 | USL | 1 | 0 | — | | — | | — | | 1 | 0 |
| Swope Park Rangers (loan) | 2019 | USL | 3 | 0 | — | | — | | — | | 3 | 0 |
| Swope Park Rangers (loan) | Total | | 4 | 0 | 0 | 0 | 0 | 0 | 0 | 0 | 4 | 0 |
| Nashville SC | 2020 | MLS | 1 | 0 | 0 | 0 | — | | — | | 1 | 0 |
| Seattle Sounders FC | 2020 | MLS | 2 | 0 | 0 | 0 | — | | 1 | 0 | 3 | 0 |
| Seattle Sounders FC | 2021 | MLS | 25 | 4 | 0 | 0 | 3 (Note: Appearance(s) in the Leagues Cup) | 0 | — | | 28 | 4 |
| Seattle Sounders FC | 2022 | MLS | 21 | 0 | 1 | 0 | 1 | 0 | — | | 23 | 0 |
| Seattle Sounders FC | Total | | 48 | 4 | 1 | 0 | 4 | 0 | 1 | 0 | 54 | 4 |
| Tacoma Defiance | 2021 | USL | 1 | 0 | — | | — | | — | | 1 | 0 |
| Tacoma Defiance | 2022 | MLSNP | 1 | 0 | — | | — | | — | | 1 | 0 |
| Career total | | | 170 | 10 | 16 | 1 | 6 | 0 | 3 | 0 | 195 | 11 |

== Honours ==
Sporting Kansas City

- MLS Cup: 2013
- U.S. Open Cup: 2015, 2017

Seattle Sounders FC

- CONCACAF Champions League: 2022

Columbus Crew

- MLS Cup: 2023
