= João Paulo (footballer, born 1991) =

Brazilian footballer

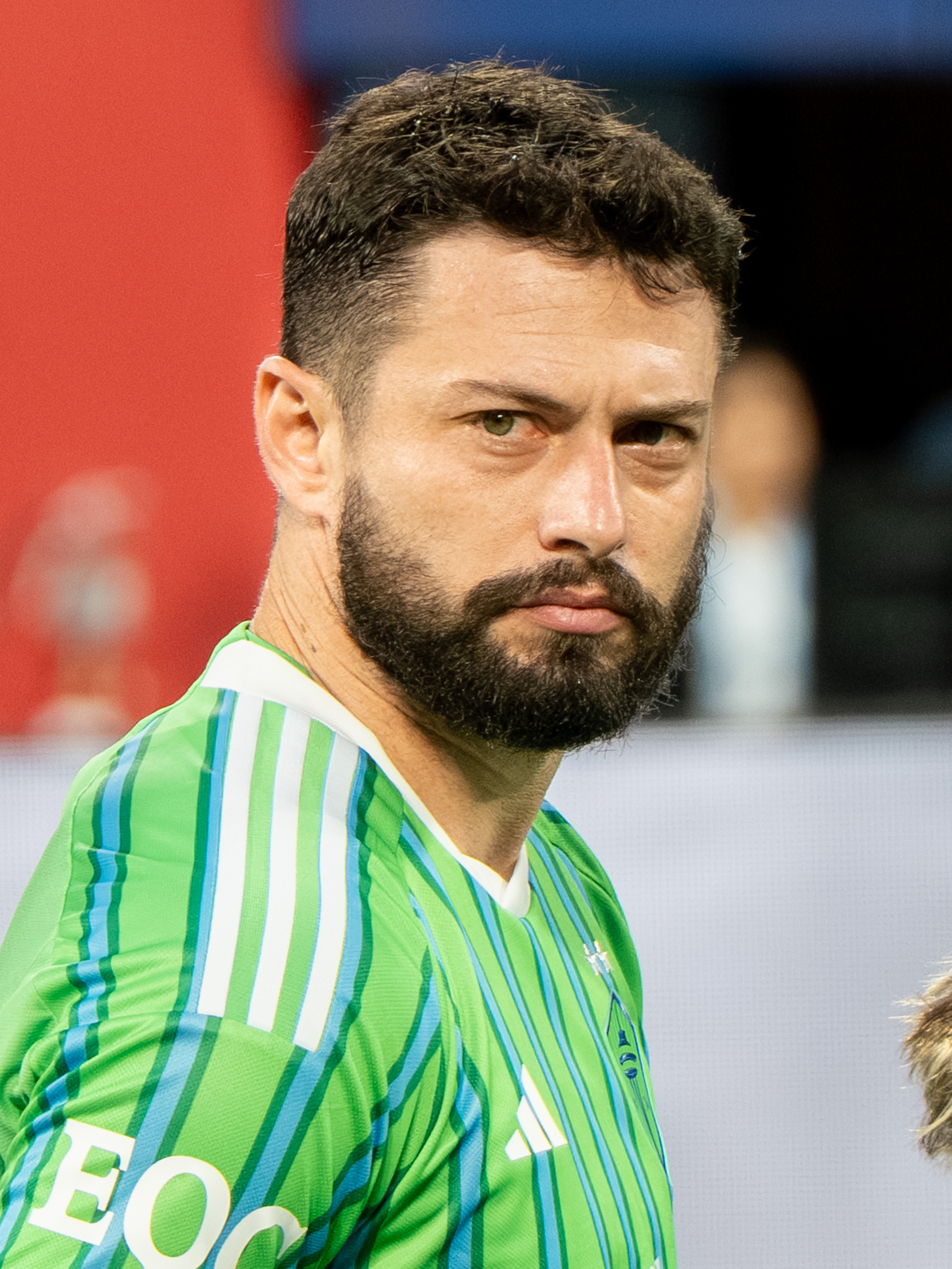
- Paulo with Seattle Sounders FC in 2025

Personal information
- Full name: João Paulo Mior
- Date of birth: 8 March 1991 (age 35)
- Place of birth: Serafina Corrêa, Rio Grande do Sul, Brazil
- Height: 1.70 m (5 ft 7 in)
- Position: Midfielder

Team information
- Current team: Tacoma Defiance (assistant coach)

Youth career
- 2004–2006: Gaúcho
- 2007–2009: Internacional

Senior career*
Years	Team	Apps	(Gls)
2010–2015	Internacional	39	(1)
2013	→ Atlético Goianiense (loan)	45	(6)
2014	→ Goiás (loan)	12	(0)
2015	→ Santa Cruz (loan)	45	(3)
2016	Santa Cruz	44	(3)
2017–2021	Botafogo	93	(6)
2020	→ Seattle Sounders FC (loan)	23	(2)
2021–2025	Seattle Sounders FC	85	(4)

Managerial career
- 2026–: Tacoma Defiance (assistant)
- * Club domestic league appearances and goals as of 11:26, 11 January 2025 (UTC)

João Paulo Mior (born 8 March 1991), known as João Paulo, is a Brazilian former professional footballer who played as a central midfielder. Since 2026, he has been an assistant coach with Tacoma Defiance of MLS Next Pro in the United States.

== Career ==
João Paulo played youth futsal until the age of 14, when he switched to football on a full-time basis. He made his professional debut for Internacional in the 2010 Campeonato Gaúcho and he spent three seasons with the club. He was then loaned out to Atlético Goianiense in 2013, Goiás in 2014, and Santa Cruz in 2015. João Paulo transferred permanently to Santa Cruz in 2016 before being signed by Botafogo, where he played for three seasons and made 68 appearances, scoring five goals.

=== Seattle Sounders FC ===
On 31 January 2020, João Paulo was signed on loan by Seattle Sounders FC of Major League Soccer to a Designated Player contract. He made his debut in two 2020 CONCACAF Champions League fixtures, playing both legs in the Round of 16 against Honduran club C.D. Olimpia. During the first leg in San Pedro Sula, João Paulo scored the opening goal in a 2–2 draw; in the second leg, he scored Seattle's second goal in another 2–2 draw and converted his penalty in the shootout, but the Sounders were unable to advance. In his first MLS season with the club, which was shortened due to the COVID-19 pandemic, João Paulo made 19 appearances, including 17 starts, scoring two goals and recording five assists as a deep-lying playmaker.

His loan was made permanent by Seattle on 21 January 2021. João Paulo scored the club's first goal of the 2021 season, a volley from outside the penalty area against Minnesota United FC, which was voted MLS Goal of the Week. He played 31 matches for the Sounders during the regular season and scored three total goals, including another Goal of the Week winner in October against the Colorado Rapids. João Paulo was named to the five-candidate shortlist for the Landon Donovan MVP Award for his 11 assists and defensive performances, which helped the Sounders qualify for the playoffs despite a depleted roster.

João Paulo scored his first goal of the 2022 season against Minnesota—his third against the club—during a 2–1 away victory on 2 April. He played through Seattle's run to the 2022 CONCACAF Champions League Final, where he started in both legs as the Sounders won their first continental title. João Paulo left the final's second leg in the first half with an anterior cruciate ligament tear that left him unable to play for the rest of the year. His role in midfield was initially replaced with 16-year-old youth product Obed Vargas, who he had mentored, but Vargas suffered a back injury a month later. The lack of available defensive midfielders on the team was a factor in Seattle missing the MLS Cup Playoffs for the first time in their history.

On 16 November 2025, João Paulo announced that he would leave the club and enter free agency. He played 119 matches across all competitions for the Sounders and scored six goals. On 21 January 2026, João Paulo announced his retirement on Instagram.

== Coaching career ==
On 2 February 2026, the Tacoma Defiance announced João Paulo as an assistant coach for the team, which serves as the reserve side for the Sounders and plays in MLS Next Pro.

== Career statistics ==
As of match played 30 November 2024

Appearances and goals by club, season and competition
Club	Season	League			State League		Cup		Continental		Other		Total	
Club	Season	Division	Apps	Goals	Apps	Goals	Apps	Goals	Apps	Goals	Apps	Goals	Apps	Goals
Internacional	2010	Série A	0	0	3 (Note: Appearance(s) in Campeonato Gaúcho)	0	—		—		—		3	0
Internacional	2011	Série A	14	0	1	0	—		—		—		15	0
Internacional	2012	Série A	4	0	14	1	—		4 (Note: Appearances in Copa Libertadores)	0	—		22	1
Internacional	2013	Série A	—		3	0	—		—		—		3	0
Internacional	Total		18	0	21	1	—		4	0	—		43	1
Atlético Goianiense (loan)	2013	Série B	35	4	10 (Note: Appearances in Campeonato Goiano)	2	3	0	—		—		48	6
Goiás (loan)	2014	Série A	5	0	7	0	1	0	0	0	—		13	0
Santa Cruz (loan)	2015	Série B	34	1	11 (Note: Appearances in Campeonato Pernambucano)	2	—		3 (Note: Appearances in Copa Sudamericana)	0	—		48	3
Santa Cruz	2016	Série A	34	2	10	1	3	0	—		10 (Note: Appearances in Copa do Nordeste)	0	57	6
Botafogo	2017	Série A	30	2	6 (Note: Appearances in Campeonato Carioca)	0	6	0	13	1	—		55	3
Botafogo	2018	Série A	2	0	12	0	1	0	—		—		15	0
Botafogo	2019	Série A	36	3	7	1	2	0	4	0	—		49	4
Botafogo	Total		68	5	25	1	9	0	17	1	—		119	7
Seattle Sounders FC (loan)	2020	MLS	23	2	—		—		2 (Note: Appearances in CONCACAF Champions League)	2	4 (Note: Appearances in MLS Cup Playoffs)	0	25	4
Seattle Sounders FC	2021	MLS	32	3	—		—		—		4 (Note: Three appearances in Leagues Cup, one appearance in MLS Cup Playoffs)	0	36	3
Seattle Sounders FC	2022	MLS	6	1	—		0	0	6	0	—		12	1
Seattle Sounders FC	2023	MLS	31	0	—		1	0	—		7 (Note: One appearance in FIFA Club World Cup, four appearances in MLS Cup Playoffs, two appearances in Leagues Cup)	0	39	0
Seattle Sounders FC	2024	MLS	21	0	—		2	0	—		9 (Note: Five appearances in Leagues Cup, four appearances in MLS Cup Playoffs)	0	32	0
Seattle Sounders FC	Total		80	4	—		3	0	6	0	20	0	119	4
Career total			307	18	83	7	19	0	32	3	34	0	480	31

== Personal life ==
João Paulo has been a fan of American football since his childhood and supports the Pittsburgh Steelers. He is the nephew of former Gremio player Casemiro Mior.

== Honours ==
Internacional

- Recopa Sudamericana: 2011

Santa Cruz

- Campeonato Pernambucano: 2015, 2016
- Copa do Nordeste: 2016

Botafogo

- Campeonato Carioca: 2018

Seattle Sounders FC

- CONCACAF Champions League: 2022

Individual

- MLS All-Star: 2021
- MLS Best XI: 2021
