= Ethan Dobbelaere =

American soccer player

Personal information
- Full name: Ethan Christopher Dobbelaere
- Date of birth: November 14, 2002 (age 23)
- Place of birth: Seattle, Washington, United States
- Height: 5 ft 10 in (1.78 m)
- Position: Midfielder

Youth career
- 2015–2020: Seattle Sounders FC

Senior career*
| Years | Team | Apps | (Gls) |
| 2019–2023 | Tacoma Defiance | 37 | (5) |
| 2020–2023 | Seattle Sounders FC | 17 | (0) |
| 2022 | → MFK Vyškov (loan) | 0 | (0) |

International career^{‡}
| 2019 | United States U17 | 3 | (0) |
- * Club domestic league appearances and goals as of April 2, 2023 ‡ National team caps and goals as of October 13, 2019

Ethan Christopher Dobbelaere (born November 14, 2002) is an American professional soccer player who plays as a midfielder.

== Professional career ==
An academy product, Dobbelaere signed with the Seattle Sounders FC first team on June 15, 2020.

Dobbelaere was loaned to Czech club MFK Vyškov on February 5, 2022.

On December 15, 2023, he was picked up by D.C. United on waivers.

== Career statistics ==
=== Club ===
As of match played May 10, 2023

Appearances and goals by club, season and competition
| Club | Season | League | | | National cup | | Other | | Total | |
| Club | Season | Division | Apps | Goals | Apps | Goals | Apps | Goals | Apps | Goals |
|---|---|---|---|---|---|---|---|---|---|---|
| Tacoma Defiance | 2019 | USL | 7 | 1 | — | | — | | 7 | 1 |
| Tacoma Defiance | 2020 | USL | 6 | 1 | — | | — | | 6 | 1 |
| Tacoma Defiance | 2021 | USL | 14 | 0 | — | | — | | 14 | 0 |
| Tacoma Defiance | 2022 | MLS Next Pro | 10 | 3 | — | | — | | 10 | 3 |
| Tacoma Defiance | Total | | 37 | 5 | 0 | 0 | 0 | 0 | 37 | 5 |
| Seattle Sounders FC | 2020 | MLS | 1 | 0 | — | | — | | 1 | 0 |
| Seattle Sounders FC | 2021 | MLS | 7 | 0 | — | | — | | 7 | 0 |
| Seattle Sounders FC | 2022 | MLS | 8 | 0 | 1 | 0 | — | | 9 | 0 |
| Seattle Sounders FC | 2023 | MLS | 1 | 0 | 2 | 1 | — | | 3 | 1 |
| Seattle Sounders FC | Total | | 17 | 0 | 3 | 1 | 0 | 0 | 20 | 1 |
| D.C. United | 2024 | MLS | 0 | 0 | 0 | 0 | 0 | 0 | 0 | 0 |
| D.C. United | Total | | 17 | 0 | 3 | 1 | 0 | 0 | 20 | 1 |
| Career total | | | 54 | 5 | 3 | 1 | 0 | 0 | 57 | 6 |
