= 2020 Seattle Sounders FC season =

American soccer team season

Seattle Sounders FC
2020 season
- General manager: Garth Lagerwey
- Head coach: Brian Schmetzer
- Stadium: CenturyLink Field
- Major League Soccer: Conference: 2nd Overall: 6th
- MLS Cup playoffs: Runners-up
- U.S. Open Cup: Canceled
- CONCACAF Champions League: Round of 16
- Campeones Cup: Canceled
- MLS is Back Tournament: Round of 16
- Top goalscorer: League: Raúl Ruidíaz (12); All: Raúl Ruidíaz (14)
- Highest home attendance: League: 40,126 (Mar. 1 vs. Chicago) (Note: Only two home matches—on March 1 and March 7—were played in front of fans; the Sounders played behind closed doors for the rest of the regular season and playoffs due to the COVID-19 pandemic.)
- Lowest home attendance: League: 33,080 (Mar. 7 vs. Columbus)
- Average home league attendance: League: 36,603 (Open matches only)
- Biggest win: League: 7–1 vs. San Jose (Sep. 10)
- Biggest defeat: League: 1–4 at Los Angeles (July 27); Playoffs: 0–3 at Columbus (Dec. 12)
Home colors	Away colors

The 2020 season was Seattle Sounders FC's twelfth season in Major League Soccer (MLS), the top flight of professional club soccer in the United States. It was the 37th season played by a professional team bearing the Sounders name, which had originated in 1974 with the first incarnation of the franchise. The team was under the management of Brian Schmetzer, who was in his fourth full MLS season as head coach of the Sounders.

The Sounders were the reigning MLS Cup champions, having defeated Toronto FC 3–1 in the 2019 final at their home stadium, CenturyLink Field (renamed Lumen Field in November 2020). The season began with two home matches but was suspended on March 12, 2020, due to the COVID-19 pandemic; the second Sounders match had reduced attendance due to the pandemic's spread in the Seattle metropolitan area. MLS resumed with a special tournament in July hosted in the Orlando area, and teams returned home a month later to play in matches behind closed doors. The Sounders only played 22 regular season matches, mostly against opponents in the Western Conference, due to a shortened schedule and several canceled matches. The 2020 Campeones Cup was canceled along with the 2020 U.S. Open Cup.

Seattle qualified for the 2020 MLS Cup Playoffs as the second-placed team in the Western Conference, determined by points per game due to the unbalanced number of games played by MLS teams during the season. The Sounders defeated Los Angeles FC, FC Dallas, and Minnesota United FC at home to win a second consecutive conference championship and qualify for MLS Cup 2020, where they lost 3–0 to Columbus Crew SC.

== Background ==
Seattle Sounders FC were announced as an MLS expansion team in 2007 and joined the league two years later; the team were the third to use the Sounders name, which had originated with an earlier team in the former North American Soccer League in 1974. During their first eleven seasons in MLS, the club won two MLS Cup championships, one Supporters' Shield, and four U.S. Open Cup titles, making them one of the most successful in American soccer. The Sounders had also qualified for the MLS Cup Playoffs during each season, setting an MLS record, and also led the league in average attendance for several years. Brian Schmetzer, formerly an assistant coach for the Sounders under Sigi Schmid, was hired as interim head coach in July 2016 and took the job on a permanent basis later that year as he guided the team to their first MLS Cup. The team finished the 2019 season with the second-best record in the Western Conference and won their second MLS Cup title after defeating Toronto FC at CenturyLink Field.

The team debuted a new primary jersey for the season, named "Forever Green", that adds wave-like stripes in several shades of green to the main Rave Green kit used since 2009. The jersey also incorporates three white stripes added for all MLS jerseys to reflect the league's 25th season along with the flag of Cascadia and an outline of the state of Washington. The Sounders retained their 2019 secondary jersey, named "Nightfall", a black-and-pink design that was inspired by a sunset at CenturyLink Field during a 2014 match. The 2020 season also marked the second year of a sponsorship agreement with online retailer Zulily, who had their logo displayed on both jerseys. WaFd Bank was announced as the team's first sleeve patch sponsor in July 2020 and had their logo displayed on both shoulders through the end of the season.

== Summary ==
=== Roster moves ===
The club initially retained 19 players over the offseason and lost several significant players, including winger Víctor Rodríguez, winner of the MLS Cup 2019 most valuable player award; and starting defenders Román Torres and Kim Kee-hee. Backup goalkeeper Bryan Meredith also left the Sounders after he was selected by Inter Miami CF in the 2019 MLS Expansion Draft. At the start of training camp in early January, the Sounders had 21 signed first-team players and were still engaged in talks with several others, but they lacked replacements in defense and for Rodríguez. General manager Garth Lagerwey stated that the club had yet to make major roster decisions due to the ongoing negotiations between the league and the MLS Players Association over a new collective bargaining agreement, which would affect the salary cap. Schmetzer also led a scouting trip to Argentina in December 2019 as part of preparations for the season.

On January 31, 2020, the Sounders announced that they had signed Brazilian midfielder João Paulo, on loan from Botafogo, to a Designated Player contract. The club also signed defenders Yeimar Gómez Andrade, Miguel Ibarra, and Shane O'Neill to replace Torres, Kee-hee, and left-back Brad Smith, who returned to AFC Bournemouth following the end of his loan. Existing midfielder Alex Roldán was also shifted to right-back and signed to a new contract after his option was initially declined during the offseason. The team also added John Hutchinson and Henry Brauner as development coaches during preseason and retained most of their existing technical staff.

=== Preseason and CONCACAF Champions League ===
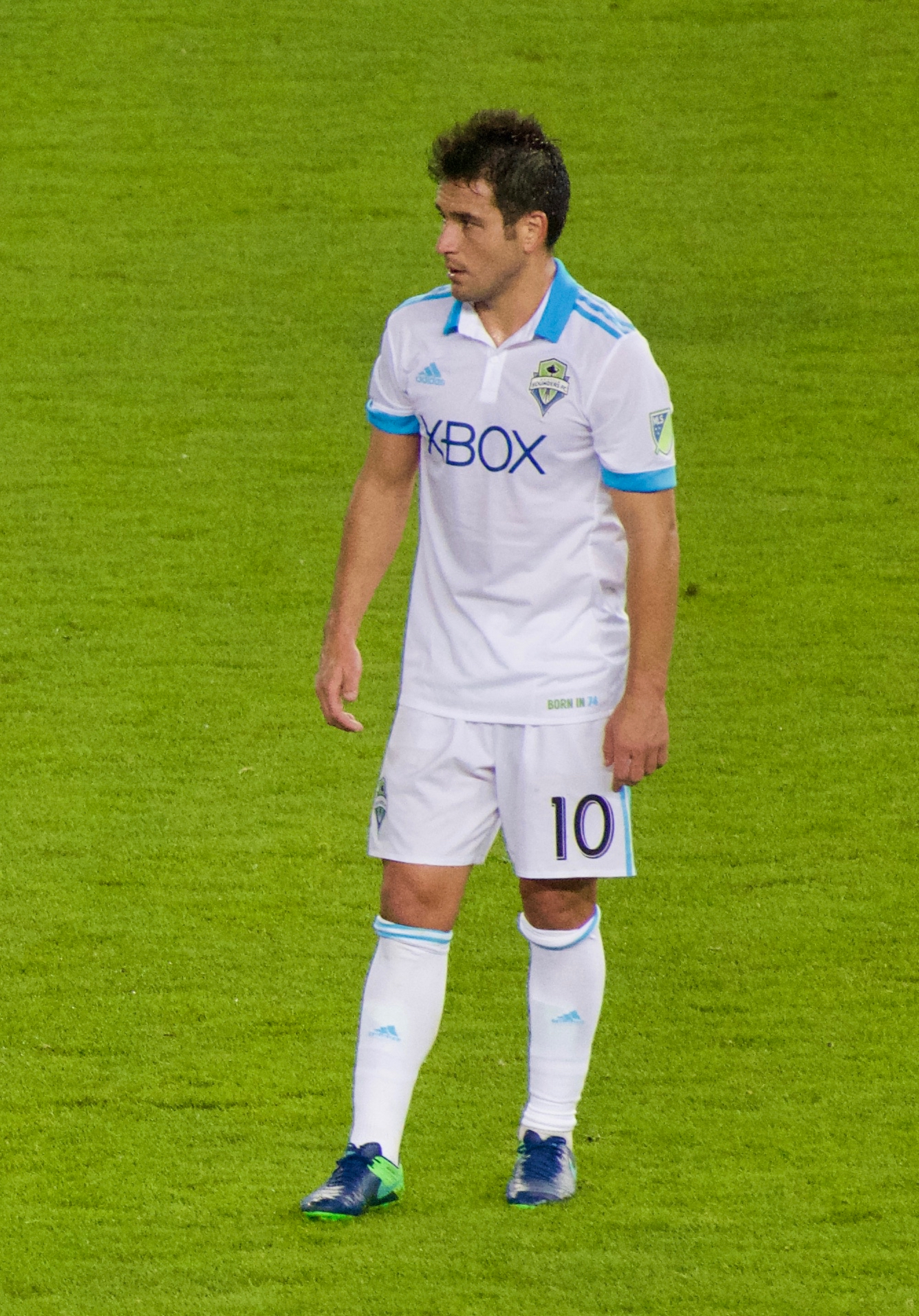
Midfielder Nicolás Lodeiro (pictured in 2017) was absent during part of preseason and the CONCACAF Champions League round of 16.

The club opened their preseason training camp at Starfire Sports on January 14 amid snowy conditions. Several young, unsigned players were called up to the training camp, as well as members of the Seattle Sounders FC Academy and reserve team Tacoma Defiance; key members of the team, including Jordan Morris and Cristian Roldan, were absent from the training camp due to international callups. After four days, the Sounders traveled to Long Beach, California, to open a twelve-day training camp that would also include a pair of friendlies and other scrimmages. The team were defeated 1–0 by Uruguay's Peñarol in their first friendly and won 3–2 against Loyola Marymount University a week later in an extended scrimmage.

The Sounders returned to Seattle to play the Sacramento Republic FC of the second-division USL Championship on February 5 at CenturyLink Field. The hosts won 6–2 during the 117-minute match, which was divided between the first team for 72 minutes and a combination of reserves and trialists for the remaining 45 minutes. The team departed the following day to begin a second travelling camp based in Mexico City as part of preparations for the CONCACAF Champions League. In Mexico City, the Sounders played two friendlies on February 12 against local teams, drawing 2–2 with Atlético Zacatepec using most of their starting lineup and defeating the under-20 reserves for UNAM Pumas 2–1. Midfielder and captain Nicolás Lodeiro was absent from part of the preseason camps while undergoing treatment for tendinitis in Uruguay and remained unavailable to begin the season.

In the Champions League's round of 16, the club faced Honduran side C.D. Olimpia, who hosted the first leg in San Pedro Sula. The visiting Sounders took a 2–0 lead early in the second half with goals from João Paulo, making his debut for Seattle, and Jordan Morris; several yellow cards were issued by referee Juan Calderón during a scuffle that followed a controversial challenge by Justin Arboleda on goalkeeper Stefan Frei in the first half. Arboleda went on to score twice in the second half to complete a 2–2 draw for Olimpia. The Sounders conceded early in the second leg, but goals from João Paulo and Cristian Roldan gave the hosts a 2–1 lead in the second half; a volleyed goal by Carlos Pineda in the 86th minute equalized the match's score at 2–2 and aggregate score at 4–4 with no away goals advantage. After a scoreless extra time, the Sounders lost 2–4 in the penalty shootout and were eliminated from the Champions League.

=== March and COVID-19 suspension ===
Under the original 34-match regular season schedule, the Sounders would face each team in the Western Conference twice and play the remaining ten matches against teams from the Eastern Conference in 2020. As the league had expanded to 26 teams, the now-unbalanced schedule would no longer have teams playing every other MLS team during the season; the Sounders were not expected to play against FC Cincinnati, Orlando City SC, and the Philadelphia Union during the 2020 regular season. The team's first regular season match was played at CenturyLink Field on March 1 against the Chicago Fire, which the Sounders won 2–1 in front of 40,126 spectators. The hosts conceded early in the second half, but halftime substitute Jordan Morris scored two goals, the latter in stoppage time; he also had an earlier assist on a goal by Cristian Roldan that was ruled offside by the referee.

The March 1 match was played amid a local outbreak of COVID-19, which had been detected in the Seattle metropolitan area in late January; the first U.S. death attributed to the disease and a state of emergency declared by Governor Jay Inslee were announced the day before the match. The Sounders announced further precautions, including the deployment of hand sanitizer stations at the stadium, that would carry over into the next match. The second match, a 1–1 draw with the Columbus Crew on March 7, had an attendance of 33,080—the lowest for an MLS regular season game in Seattle since 2009. A stadium concessions worker tested positive for COVID-19 after a Seattle Sea Dragons game, but public health authorities permitted the Sounders match to be held with full capacity. The club remained in contact with local health officials over the following week and prepared several contingency plans to address the COVID-19 outbreak, including postponement or playing without spectators.

The Sounders announced on March 11 that their next home match against FC Dallas, originally scheduled for March 21, would be postponed due to a statewide ban on large gatherings. The following day, MLS suspended the season for a month due to the impact of the pandemic; the Sounders, who had been scheduled to fly to Houston for an away match, also canceled all operations until further notice. The U.S. Open Cup was also postponed—and later canceled entirely along with the Campeones Cup, which the Sounders were scheduled to host on August 12. The team began holding videoconference practice and conditioning sessions, as well as weekly chat sessions, over Zoom while preparing for the resumption of league activity. Players were also shipped a "care package" that included a soccer ball, hand sanitizer, and basic exercise equipment. Sounders majority owner Adrian Hanauer also announced a $500,000 investment into a club relief fund for businesses, workers, and non-profits in Seattle that were affected by the lack of matches at CenturyLink Field. Season ticket holders were given the choice of a refund for the remaining home matches, a credit for future matches in 2020 or 2021, or an early renewal for 2021 using the 2020 season as credit.

=== MLS is Back in Orlando ===
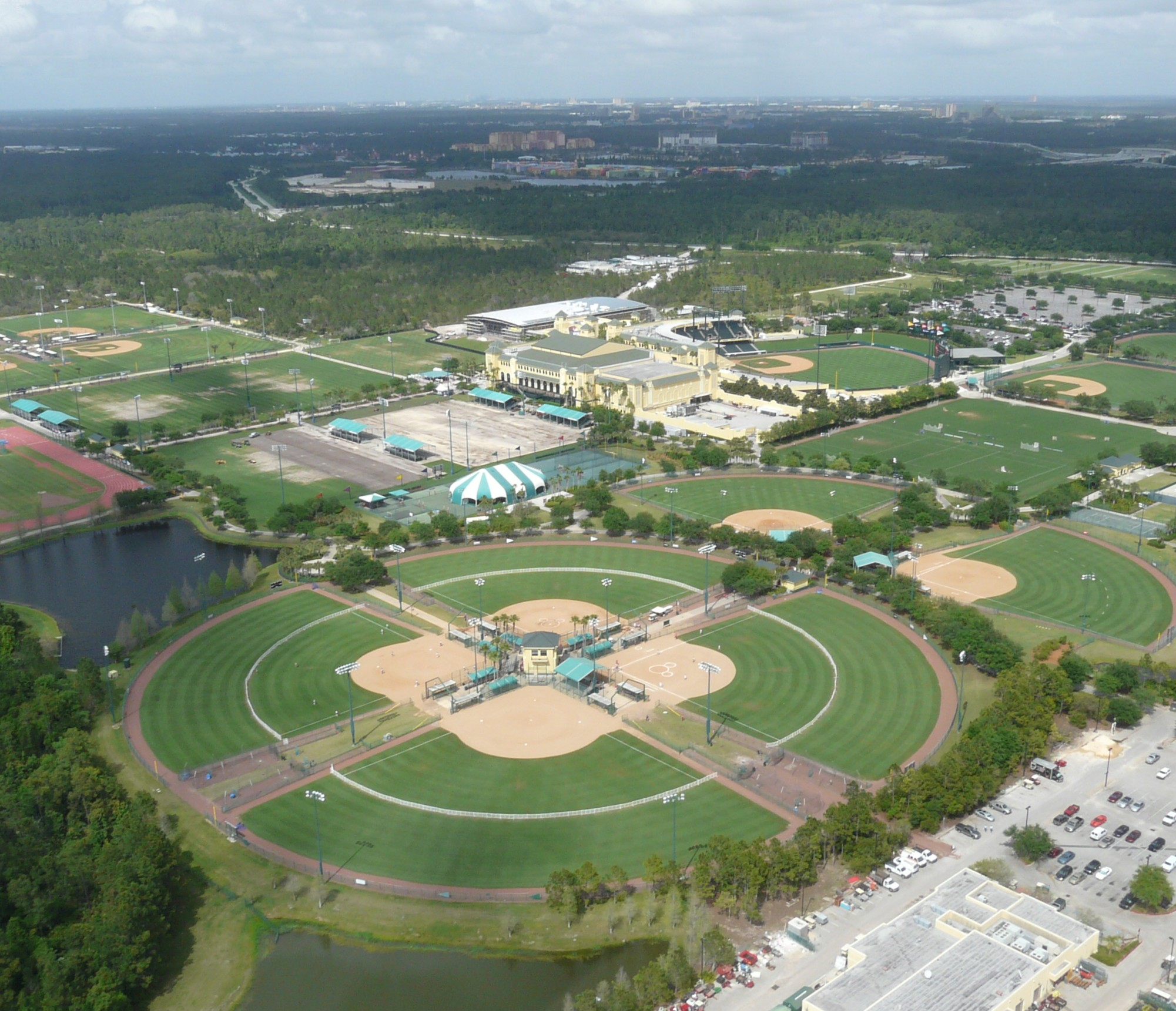
Aerial view of the ESPN Wide World of Sports Complex near Orlando, Florida, host venue of the MLS is Back Tournament

MLS permitted clubs to begin voluntary workouts and in-person sessions in early May with health and safety protocols in place. The Sounders resumed individualized training sessions at Starfire Sports on May 18 with outdoor social distancing, limited use of indoor facilities, daily temperature and symptom screenings, and use of personal protective equipment. The sessions resumed two weeks later than most MLS teams due to stricter local regulations, which also limited group training to passing balls between delineated areas. Among the participants was Jordan Morris, who has type 1 diabetes and would have been at greater risk of complications from COVID-19. Midfielder Harry Shipp, a seven-year league veteran who had been with the club since 2017, announced his retirement from professional soccer in June to pursue a business degree.

During the same month, the league announced that the season would resume through the MLS is Back Tournament, a leaguewide competition that would be hosted behind closed doors the following month. During the tournament, which was played at the ESPN Wide World of Sports Complex near Orlando, Florida, participating players and staff were isolated in a "bubble", wore masks and socially distanced except while playing, underwent frequent temperature checks and COVID-19 testing, and quarantined upon arrival. Each player was assigned their own room, and each team was given an entire hotel floor; players and staff were not permitted to leave the "bubble" at the Walt Disney World Resort, which included access to restaurants and convention space. A rising number of positive COVID-19 cases in Florida and among MLS players prompted the Emerald City Supporters to organize a small protest at the final Sounders training session before their flight to join the tournament.

The Sounders were drawn into Group B along with FC Dallas, the San Jose Earthquakes, and Vancouver Whitecaps FC; the three group stage matches would count towards regular season standings, while the knockout round would not. FC Dallas withdrew from the tournament upon arrival due to a COVID-19 outbreak in their squad and were replaced in the group by the Chicago Fire. The Sounders played through the tournament without midfielder João Paulo due to a quad injury but saw the return of captain Nicolás Lodeiro.

The team drew 0–0 with the Earthquakes in the opener, during which Frei made eight saves to preserve a shutout. The team then lost 2–1 to the Fire during a match that required extra preparations for players due to the 9 a.m. start time, including a modified sleep schedule. Seattle advanced to the knockout round by finishing second in Group B with four points; Morris earned a penalty kick and scored a goal as the team won 3–0 in their final group stage match against Vancouver, who lost goalkeeper Maxime Crépeau to a broken thumb in the second half. The Sounders were eliminated in the round of 16 with a 4–1 loss to Los Angeles FC, who took advantage of a brace by Diego Rossi and several defensive mistakes. Seattle's goal in the 75th minute was scored by Will Bruin, who was playing his first match in 13 months following an anterior cruciate ligament injury.

=== Regular season resumption ===
Map of August–November regular season venues for the 2020 Sounders season

The Sounders returned from Orlando at the end of July and began preparing for the resumption of the regular season at home venues tentatively scheduled for the following month. The remaining schedule was to be played against Western Conference teams in regional blocs to reduce travel and was released in several phases because it was uncertain if further matches could be played as planned. Home matches at CenturyLink Field would remain behind closed doors due to state and local regulations with tarps over empty seats and recorded audio from previous matches to simulate a matchday environment for players and the television broadcast. Signs and banners from several supporters groups, including prominent social justice slogans, were also installed in the Brougham End. The Cascadia Cup, contested by the Sounders alongside rivals Portland and Vancouver, was not awarded during the 2020 season following a decision by supporters groups to exclude matches without fans in attendance. The club also announced a new broadcast contract with Amazon to simulcast locally televised matches on their Prime Video platform for residents of Washington state; the streaming deal had been negotiated in March, but its implementation was delayed due to the COVID-19 pandemic.

The team traveled on August 23 to face the Portland Timbers, who had won the MLS is Back Tournament, and won 3–0 behind closed doors at Providence Park with two goals and an assist by Ruidíaz. As part of a multi-sport strike by professional athletes in the United States to protest the shooting of Jacob Blake in Wisconsin, the Sounders refused to play against the LA Galaxy. The away match was postponed as a result of the protest, which also affected other MLS matches. In their first home match since March, Seattle defeated Los Angeles FC 3–1 using their full starting lineup and rose to second in the Western Conference. Ruidíaz scored from a volleyed strike in the eleventh minute which was followed by two goals in the second half by Morris scored a minute apart. The Sounders traveled two days later to play Real Salt Lake, who were permitted to admit over 4,000 spectators into Rio Tinto Stadium, and took the lead twice through a penalty scored by Lodeiro and later a header by defender Yeimar for his first career MLS goal. Salt Lake equalized after each goal and earned a 2–2 draw with Seattle, who were using a rotated lineup to rest players.

The Sounders returned to CenturyLink Field for a three-match home stand that would feature rematches against several recent opponents, beginning with the Portland Timbers. Seattle conceded early but found an equalizer through Kelvin Leerdam before halftime; however, a late goal by Felipe Mora gave Portland a 2–1 victory. The second match, played under hazy conditions due to smoke from nearby wildfires, was a 7–1 win against the San Jose Earthquakes that set several records. The Sounders became the fastest MLS team to score five goals, doing so in 33 minutes, and tied the record for most goals in the first half; the team also set a franchise record for the most goals scored in a single match. Raúl Ruidíaz and Joevin Jones scored two goals each and also assisted on other goals scored by Jordan Morris, Leerdam, and João Paulo. The Sounders then faced Los Angeles FC and took the lead in the first half through two penalty kicks converted by Lodeiro five minutes apart; one of the penalties was awarded following video review of a handball. Ruidíaz then added a strike in the 82nd minute to give the hosts a 3–0 victory and take them to first place in the Western Conference.

The final two matches of September were played on the road and required same-day flights to Portland and Los Angeles. The Sounders signed two returning defenders, Brad Smith from free agency and Román Torres in a trade with Inter Miami CF, to add depth and options to rotate players for midweek matches. The team lost 1–0 to the Timbers, who took an early lead through Yimmi Chará; Portland goalkeeper Steve Clark made six saves as the Sounders had a majority of possession and chances in the second half while unsuccessfully searching for an equalizer. Ruidíaz was suspended for the following match by the MLS Disciplinary Committee for his reaction to a challenge by Pablo Bonilla during the Portland match. A brace from Cristian Roldan and another goal by Jordan Morris helped the Sounders defeat the Galaxy 3–1 to maintain their place atop the conference heading into October.

=== October and November ===
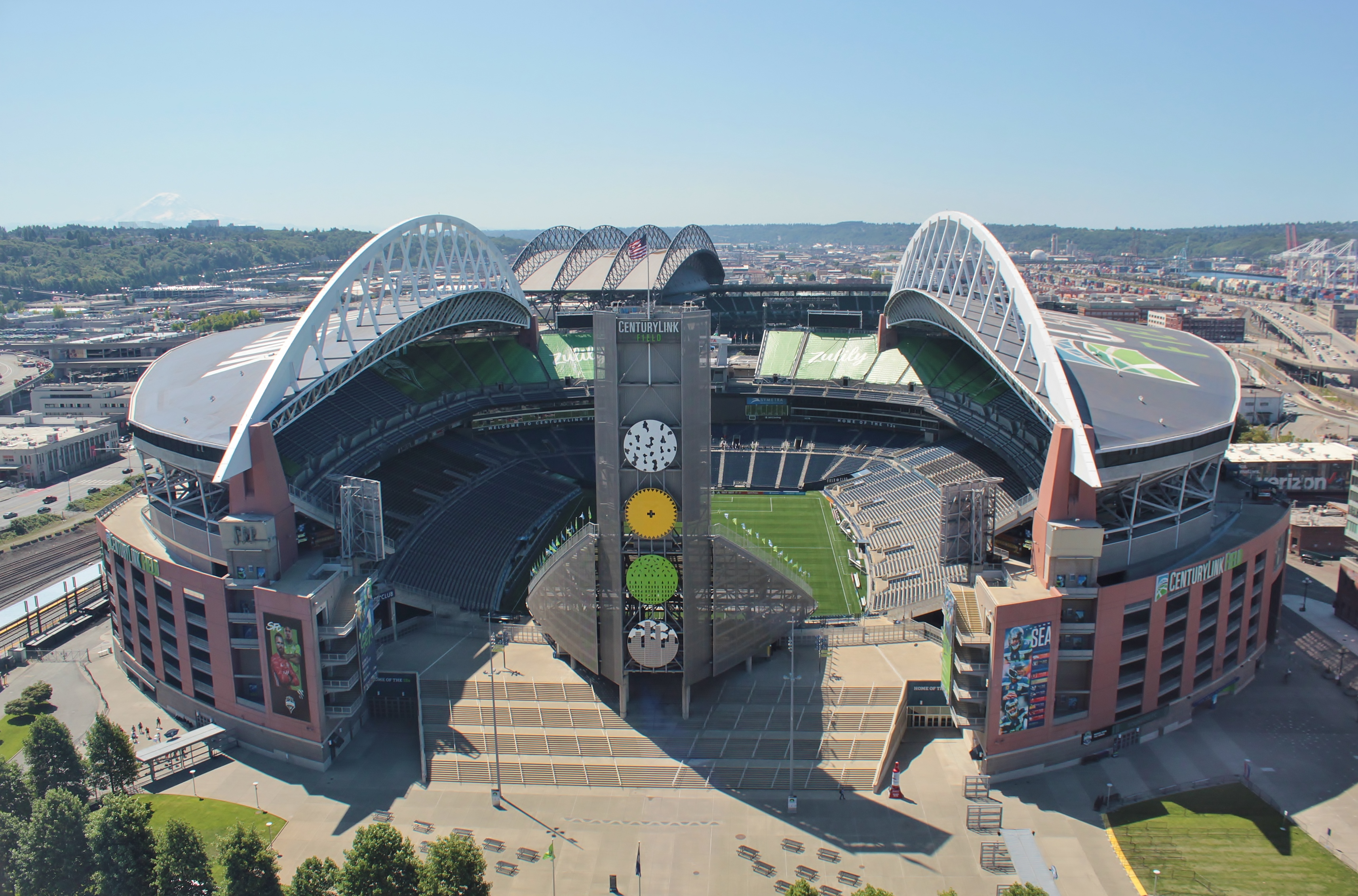
The Sounders played home matches at CenturyLink Field (renamed Lumen Field in November) without spectators for the rest of the 2020 season.

Three players—Ruidíaz, midfielder Gustav Svensson, and defender Xavier Arreaga—were called up to their national teams in October and were expected to miss up to five MLS matches due to a required ten-day quarantine period. On October 3, the Sounders hosted Vancouver Whitecaps FC and were kept scoreless in the first half but won 3–1 through a trio of goals scored during a twelve-minute span in the second half. João Paulo, an own goal from Érik Godoy, and a Ruidíaz header contributed to the home side's victory, while the Whitecaps converted a penalty kick that was called for a foul committed by Yeimar; a red card was initially issued to Yeimar before it was rescinded through video review. The Sounders won 2–1 in their next home match four days later against Real Salt Lake, with goals from Morris at close range and a Yeimar header off a free kick; Nouhou's own goal in the 68th minute was the only shot on target for the visitors.

Four days later, the Sounders played away to Los Angeles FC for the first time in 2020 and lost 3–1 as both sides fielded lineups without players called up to national teams. Danny Musovski scored twice and assisted another goal for LAFC, and Lodeiro converted a long-range free kick; the Sounders had 18 shots but were unable to finish most of their chances. A home match against the Colorado Rapids on October 14 was initially postponed due to a COVID-19 outbreak in the Rapids squad; it was later canceled along with four other unplayed fixtures for Colorado. Earlier that week, Ruidíaz tested positive for COVID-19 while with the Peru national team and was placed in quarantine with an unclear timeline for his return to Seattle. The Sounders then faced the San Jose Earthquakes on the road and finished the match with a scoreless draw; both sides managed few chances to score in what was described as a "defensive battle" in contrast to the earlier 7–1 match, which had only one save from each goalkeeper. In their fourth meeting of the season, Seattle and Portland played to a 1–1 draw at CenturyLink Field after several missed chances to score were followed by a late goal from Will Bruin in stoppage time.

Several key players, including Ruidíaz and Svensson, returned from national team duty for a match against Vancouver Whitecaps FC that was played at Providence Park in Portland, Oregon, due to travel restrictions imposed at the Canadian border. The Sounders were limited to one shot on goal in the first half but won 2–0 after Ruidíaz scored and assisted on a Lodeiro goal; the result also allowed the team to clinch their 12th consecutive berth in the MLS Cup Playoffs to maintain their league record. The Sounders then traveled to play the Colorado Rapids on November 1 in the Denver area, their longest away trip of the season. They lost 3–1, eliminating them from Supporters' Shield contention. Seattle had conceded first but Morris scored an equalizer in the 22nd minute; Colorado then scored two goals from long distance and shut down several attempts by the visitors in the second half. Three days later, the Sounders earned a 1–1 draw with the LA Galaxy after Ruidíaz scored in stoppage time; the away fixture replaced the August match that had been postponed due to player protests. Seattle played on Decision Day at home against the San Jose Earthquakes and scored four goals in the second half to earn a 4–1 victory. The Sounders finished the 2020 regular season as the second seed in the Western Conference behind Sporting Kansas City, as determined by points per game because teams did not play the same number of matches, and had only one loss at home.

=== Playoffs ===
The 2020 playoffs began in late November after a 12-day break for international matches; MLS waived its quarantine requirement for players who returned on charter flights. The Sounders, playing at the newly renamed Lumen Field, opened the first round against Los Angeles FC, who lost four starting players after they tested positive for COVID-19 while playing for their national teams. In the fifth match of the season between the two teams, the Sounders took a 1–0 lead at halftime from an early Lodeiro goal; the scoreline was preserved by Stefan Frei, who saved a penalty taken by Carlos Vela to keep a shutout. Ruidíaz and Morris, who were both involved in the first goal, each scored in the second half to give the hosts a 3–1 victory that mirrored the scoreline of the 2019 Western Conference Final between Seattle and LAFC. In the Conference Semifinals, Sounders hosted sixth-seeded FC Dallas in their first meeting since the 2019 playoffs, and won 1–0. The Sounders produced nine shots but were stymied by the Dallas defense for most of the match; defender Shane O'Neill scored the lone goal of the match, the second in his MLS career, from a header off a Lodeiro corner kick in the 49th minute.

The Sounders then hosted the Western Conference Final on December 8 against fourth-seeded Minnesota United FC, who had defeated top-seeded Kansas City in an upset victory four days earlier. Seattle clinched their fourth Western Conference championship with a 3–2 comeback victory that also extended their home winning streak in the playoffs to 15 matches. Minnesota took a 2–0 lead through their star midfielder Emanuel Reynoso, who scored in the first half and assisted on Bakaye Dibassy's header in the 67th minute. Substitute forward Will Bruin scored in the 75th minute from a rebound on a Ruidíaz shot that had been blocked by a defender; he was then followed by Ruidíaz, who scored the equalizer in the 89th minute from a deflected corner kick. Defender Gustav Svensson, who had missed the first two playoff matches due to a positive COVID-19 test, scored the winning header in stoppage time off a Lodeiro corner kick.

In their fourth MLS Cup final in five years, the Sounders traveled to face the Columbus Crew, the only conference semifinalist they had played earlier in the season. The final was played in front of 1,500 spectators at Mapfre Stadium, which was expected to be permanently closed the following year. Three Crew players—Darlington Nagbe, Pedro Santos, and Vito Wormgoor—were declared "medically not cleared to play" due to COVID-19, and Sounders defender Xavier Arreaga remained home for the birth of his child. The hosts scored twice from set-pieces within six minutes in the first half and another in the second—all involving midfielder Lucas Zelarayán—to defeat the Sounders 3–0. Schmetzer made half-time substitutions to add attackers, but the team only forced two saves out of Columbus's goalkeeper and were denied a third MLS Cup championship.

== Non-competitive matches ==
Key

Win Draw Loss Void Upcoming fixture

=== Preseason ===
January 22 Closed-door scrimmage	Seattle Sounders FC	0–1	Peñarol	Long Beach, California
11:00 a.m. (PST)		Report	Urretaviscaya 37'	Stadium: George Allen Field; Attendance: 0

January 29 Closed-door scrimmage	Seattle Sounders FC	3–2	Loyola Marymount University	Los Angeles, California
10:50 a.m. (PST)	Ruidíaz 14'; Delem 55'; Bwana 98'	Report	23'; 43'	Stadium: Sullivan Field; Attendance: 0
Note: 105-minute scrimmage

February 5 Closed-door scrimmage	Seattle Sounders FC	6–2	Sacramento Republic FC	Seattle, Washington
11:00 a.m. (PST)	Ruidíaz 2'; Shipp 9'; Morris 35'; Dhillon 78', 97'; A. Roldan 117'	Report	Werner 72'; Iwasa 96'	Stadium: CenturyLink Field; Attendance: 0
Note: 120-minute scrimmage

February 12 Closed-door scrimmage	Seattle Sounders FC	2–2	Club Atlético Zacatepec	Mexico City, Mexico
8:30 a.m. (PST)	Leyva (red card) 8'; Ruidíaz 2'; Morris 33'	Report	Castillo 63'; Barboza 83' (pen.)	Stadium: Centro Alto Rendimiento; Attendance: 0

February 12 Closed-door scrimmage	Seattle Sounders FC	2–1	Club Universidad Nacional U-20	Mexico City, Mexico
10:30 a.m. (PST)	Bwana 20'; Robles 61'	Report	40'	Stadium: Centro Alto Rendimiento; Attendance: 0

== Competitions ==
Key

Win Draw Loss Void Upcoming fixture

=== Major League Soccer ===
==== League tables ====
Pos	Team	Pld	W	L	T	GF	GA	GD	Pts	PPG	Qualification
1	Sporting Kansas City	21	12	6	3	38	25	+13	39	1.86	Qualification for the first round and the Leagues Cup
2	Seattle Sounders FC	22	11	5	6	44	23	+21	39	1.77	Qualification for the first round and the Leagues Cup
3	Portland Timbers	23	11	6	6	46	35	+11	39	1.70	Qualification for the first round and the CONCACAF Champions League (Note: As MLS is Back Tournament winners)
4	Minnesota United FC	21	9	5	7	36	26	+10	34	1.62	Qualification for the first round
5	Colorado Rapids	18	8	6	4	32	28	+4	28	1.56	Qualification for the first round

Source: MLS
Rules for classification: 1) points per game; 2) total wins per match played; 3) total goal differential per match played; 4) total goals scored per match played; 5) fewest disciplinary points per match played; 6) away goal differential per away match played; 7) away goals scored per away match played; 8) home goal differential per home match played; 9) home goals scored per home match played; 10) coin toss or drawing of lots.
Notes:

2020 MLS overall standings
Pos	Team	Pld	W	L	T	GF	GA	GD	Pts	PPG	
4	Columbus Crew SC (C)	23	12	6	5	36	21	+15	41	1.78	Qualification for the CONCACAF Champions League (Note: As MLS Cup 2020 champions (USA1))
5	Orlando City SC	23	11	4	8	40	25	+15	41	1.78	Qualification for the Leagues Cup (Note: As fourth place in Eastern Conference (MLS2))
6	Seattle Sounders FC	22	11	5	6	44	23	+21	39	1.77	Qualification for the Leagues Cup (Note: As second place in Western Conference (MLS3))
7	New York City FC	23	12	8	3	37	25	+12	39	1.70	Qualification for the Leagues Cup (Note: As fifth place in Eastern Conference (MLS4))
8	Portland Timbers (M)	23	11	6	6	46	35	+11	39	1.70	Qualification for the CONCACAF Champions League (Note: As MLS is Back Tournament winners (USA3))

Source: MLS
Rules for classification: 1) points per game; 2) total wins per match played; 3) total goal differential per match played; 4) total goals scored per match played; 5) fewest disciplinary points per match played; 6) away goal differential per away match played; 7) away goals scored per away match played; 8) home goal differential per home match played; 9) home goals scored per home match played; 10) coin toss or drawing of lots.
(C) Champions; (M) MLS is Back Tournament champions

==== Results summary ====
Overall								Home						Away					
Pld	W	D	L	GF	GA	GD	Pts	W	D	L	GF	GA	GD	W	D	L	GF	GA	GD
22	11	6	5	44	23	+21	39	8	3	1	30	10	+20	3	3	4	14	13	+1

Last updated: November 8, 2020.
Source: MLS

Result by matchday
Matchday	1	2	3	4	5	6	7	8	9	10	11	12	13	14	15	16	17	18	19	20	21	22	23
Stadium	H	H	N	N	N	A	A	H	A	H	H	H	A	A	H	H	A	H	A	H	A	A	H
Result	W	D	D	L	W	W	D	W	D	L	W	W	L	W	W	W	L	C	D	D	W	L	W

Source: MLS
A = Away; H = Home; N = Neutral; W = Win; D = Draw; L = Loss; C = Canceled

==== Match results ====
March 1 MLS 1	Seattle Sounders FC	2–1	Chicago Fire FC	Seattle, Washington
12:00 p.m. (PST)	Morris 62', 90+3'; Delem (yellow card) 80'; João Paulo (yellow card) 86'	Report	Berić 46'; Herbers (yellow card) 72'	Stadium: CenturyLink Field; Attendance: 40,126; Referee: Alex Chilowicz

March 7 MLS 2	Seattle Sounders FC	1–1	Columbus Crew SC	Seattle, Washington
7:00 p.m. (PST)	Jones (yellow card) 36'; Ruidíaz 79' (pen.); João Paulo (yellow card) 85'	Report	Zardes 33'; Díaz (yellow card) 62'	Stadium: CenturyLink Field; Attendance: 33,080; Referee: Jair Marrufo

March–July: MLS season suspended due to COVID-19 pandemic

July 10 MLS 3 (Note: Group stage matches during the MLS is Back Tournament counted as part of the regular season standings, but knockout matches did not.)	Seattle Sounders FC	0–0	San Jose Earthquakes	Bay Lake, Florida
6:00 p.m. (PDT)	Arreaga (yellow card) 24'	Report	Thompson (yellow card) 19'	Stadium: ESPN Wide World of Sports Complex; Attendance: 0 (behind closed doors); Referee: Drew Fischer

July 14 MLS 4	Chicago Fire FC	2–1	Seattle Sounders FC	Bay Lake, Florida
6:00 a.m. (PDT)	Herbers (yellow card) 22'; Berić 52'; Pineda 84'	Report	Hopeau (yellow card) 41'; Yeimar (yellow card) 60'; Bwana 77'; Ruidíaz (yellow card) 90'	Stadium: ESPN Wide World of Sports Complex; Attendance: 0 (behind closed doors); Referee: Rosendo Mendoza

July 19 MLS 5	Seattle Sounders FC	3–0	Vancouver Whitecaps FC	Bay Lake, Florida
7:30 p.m. (PDT)	Lodeiro 16' (pen.); Morris 34'; Leerdam (yellow card) 40'; Ruidíaz 51'	Report	Khmiri (yellow card) 16'; Reyna (yellow card) 30'	Stadium: ESPN Wide World of Sports Complex; Attendance: 0 (behind closed doors); Referee: Robert Sibiga

August 23 MLS 6	Portland Timbers	0–3	Seattle Sounders FC	Portland, Oregon
7:00 p.m. (PDT)		Report	Ruidíaz 72', 83'; Leerdam 85'	Stadium: Providence Park; Attendance: 0 Referee: Jair Marrufo
Note: Match was not eligible for Cascadia Cup due to lack of fans in attendance.

August 30 MLS 8	Seattle Sounders FC	3–1	Los Angeles FC	Seattle, Washington
7:00 p.m. (PDT)	Ruidíaz 11'; Leerdam (yellow card) 28'; Morris 48', 49'; O'Neill (yellow card) 64'	Report	Kaye (yellow card) 42'; Rossi 60'; Blessing (yellow card) 69'	Stadium: CenturyLink Field; Attendance: 0 (behind closed doors); Referee: Kevin Stott

September 2 MLS 9	Real Salt Lake	2–2	Seattle Sounders FC	Sandy, Utah
6:30 p.m. (PDT)	Herrera (yellow card) 28'; Kreilach (yellow card) 45+2'; Glad 50'; Ruíz 85'; Baird (yellow card) 90'	Report	Arreaga (yellow card) 18'; Lodeiro 29' (pen.); Yeimar 69'; João Paulo (yellow card) 80'	Stadium: Rio Tinto Stadium; Attendance: 4,026; Referee: Malik Badawi

September 6 MLS 10	Seattle Sounders FC	1–2	Portland Timbers	Seattle, Washington
7:00 p.m. (PDT)	Leerdam 42'; C. Roldan (yellow card) 45+4'; Bruin (yellow card) 76'	Report	Williamson 9', (yellow card) 90'; Villafaña (yellow card) 49'; Duvall (yellow card) 79'; Mora 83'; D. Chará (yellow card) 86'	Stadium: CenturyLink Field; Attendance: 0 (behind closed doors); Referee: Ismail Elfath
Note: Match was not eligible for Cascadia Cup due to lack of fans in attendance.

September 10 MLS 11	Seattle Sounders FC	7–1	San Jose Earthquakes	Seattle, Washington
7:00 p.m. (PDT)	Morris 4'; Ruidíaz 12', 33'; Leerdam 15'; Jones 20', 59'; João Paulo 48'	Report	Ríos (yellow card) 30'; Wondolowski 71' (pen.)	Stadium: CenturyLink Field; Attendance: 0 (behind closed doors); Referee: Allen Chapman

September 18 MLS 12	Seattle Sounders FC	3–0	Los Angeles FC	Seattle, Washington
7:00 p.m. (PDT)	Lodeiro 29' (pen.), 33' (pen.), (yellow card) 71'; Arreaga (yellow card) 63'; Ruidíaz 82'; Yeimar (yellow card) 84'	Report	Cifuentes (yellow card) 54'; Najar (yellow card) 90+4'	Stadium: CenturyLink Field; Attendance: 0 (behind closed doors); Referee: Joseph Dickerson

September 23 MLS 13	Portland Timbers	1–0	Seattle Sounders FC	Portland, Oregon
7:00 p.m. (PDT)	Y. Chará 13'; Bonilla (yellow card) 55'; Williamson (yellow card) 76'; Clark (yellow card) 90+6'	Report	Nouhou (yellow card) 36'; Ruidíaz (yellow card) 56'; A. Roldan (yellow card) 90'	Stadium: Providence Park; Attendance: 0 (behind closed doors); Referee: Allen Chapman
Note: Match was not eligible for Cascadia Cup due to lack of fans in attendance. The MLS Disciplinary Committee issued a suspension to Raúl Ruidíaz on review of the match.

September 27 MLS 14	LA Galaxy	1–3	Seattle Sounders FC	Carson, California
7:30 p.m. (PDT)	Araujo (yellow card) 40'; Lletget 88'	Report	C. Roldan 12', 61'; Morris 38'	Stadium: Dignity Health Sports Park; Attendance: 0 (behind closed doors); Referee: Jair Marrufo

October 3 MLS 15	Seattle Sounders FC	3–1	Vancouver Whitecaps FC	Seattle, Washington
7:00 p.m. (PDT)	João Paulo 46', (yellow card) 49'; Godoy 52' (o.g.); Ruidíaz 58'; Yeimar (yellow card) 65'	Report	Bikel (yellow card) 26', (red card) 68'; Cavallini (yellow card) 52'; Montero 65' (pen.)	Stadium: CenturyLink Field; Attendance: 0 (behind closed doors); Referee: Timothy Ford
Note: Match was not eligible for Cascadia Cup due to lack of fans in attendance.

October 7 MLS 16	Seattle Sounders FC	2–1	Real Salt Lake	Seattle, Washington
7:00 p.m. (PDT)	Delem (yellow card) 26'; Morris 28'; Yeimar 61'; O'Neill (yellow card) 70'	Report	Nouhou 68' (o.g.); Besler (yellow card) 76'	Stadium: CenturyLink Field; Attendance: 0 (behind closed doors); Referee: David Gantar

October 11 MLS 17	Los Angeles FC	3–1	Seattle Sounders FC	Los Angeles, California
4:00 p.m. (PDT)	Musovski 15', 84'; Ginella (yellow card) 19', (goal) 65'; El Monir (yellow card) 88'	Report	Lodeiro (yellow card) 74', (goal) 77'; João Paulo (yellow card) 80'	Stadium: Banc of California Stadium; Attendance: 0 (behind closed doors); Referee: Ramy Touchan

October 14 MLS 18	Seattle Sounders FC	N.P.	Colorado Rapids	Seattle, Washington
7:00 p.m. (PDT)		Preview (Archived)		Stadium: CenturyLink Field
Note: The match was initially postponed due to COVID-19 within the Rapids squad, but MLS later announced on October 29 that postponed matches with the Rapids would not be rescheduled.

October 18 MLS 19	San Jose Earthquakes	0–0	Seattle Sounders FC	San Jose, California
7:30 p.m. (PDT)	Judson (yellow card) 53'	Report	Yeimar (yellow card) 76'	Stadium: Earthquakes Stadium; Attendance: 0 (behind closed doors); Referee: Kevin Stott

October 22 MLS 20	Seattle Sounders FC	1–1	Portland Timbers	Seattle, Washington
7:30 p.m. (PDT)	Bruin 90+3'	Report	Flores 10'; Williamson (yellow card) 90+3'	Stadium: CenturyLink Field; Attendance: 0 (behind closed doors); Referee: Ismail Elfath
Note: Match was not eligible for Cascadia Cup due to lack of fans in attendance. Match rescheduled from October 24.

October 27 MLS 21	Vancouver Whitecaps FC	0–2	Seattle Sounders FC	Portland, Oregon
7:00 p.m. (PDT)	Cavallini (yellow card) 62'; Dájome 84'; Cornelius (yellow card) 90'	Report	Ruidíaz 54'; Lodeiro 60'	Stadium: Providence Park; Attendance: 0 (behind closed doors); Referee: Fotis Bazakos
Note: Match played in Portland due to travel restrictions between Canada and the United States during the COVID-19 pandemic. Match was not eligible for Cascadia Cup due to lack of fans in attendance.

November 1 MLS 22	Colorado Rapids	3–1	Seattle Sounders FC	Commerce City, Colorado
6:00 p.m. (PST)	Shinyashiki 11'; Rosenberry 42'; Bassett 75'	Report	Morris 22', (yellow card) 73'; Yeimar (yellow card) 35'	Stadium: Dick's Sporting Goods Park; Attendance: 0 (behind closed doors); Referee: Ismir Pekmic

November 4 MLS 7	LA Galaxy	1–1	Seattle Sounders FC	Carson, California
8:00 p.m. (PST)	Kljestan (yellow card) 20'; Chicharito 78'; Lletget (yellow card) 84'; Bingham (yellow card) 90+3'	Report	Arreaga (yellow card) 24'; O'Neill (yellow card) 72'; Ruidíaz 90+3'	Stadium: Dignity Health Sports Park; Attendance: 0 (behind closed doors); Referee: Silviu Petrescu
Note: Rescheduled from August 24 due to a player protest.

November 8 MLS 23	Seattle Sounders FC	4–1	San Jose Earthquakes	Seattle, Washington
3:30 p.m. (PST)	Lodeiro 52'; Ruidíaz 54'; Morris 74'; López 80' (o.g.)	Report	López 57'	Stadium: CenturyLink Field; Attendance: 0 (behind closed doors); Referee: Jair Marrufo

=== MLS Cup Playoffs ===
The MLS Cup Playoffs retained the single-elimination format that debuted in 2019 but was temporarily expanded to 18 teams—ten from the Eastern Conference and eight from the Western Conference as determined by points per game. A play-in round was added for the four lowest-ranked Eastern Conference entrants; the rest of the playoff matches were played between November 21 and December 12 with hosting determined by overall finish on the table.

November 24 First round	Seattle Sounders FC	3–1	Los Angeles FC	Seattle, Washington
7:30 p.m. (PST)	Lodeiro 18', (yellow card) 88'; Ruidíaz 66'; Morris 80'	Report	Atuesta 77'; El-Munir (yellow card) 90+2'	Stadium: Lumen Field; Attendance: 0 (behind closed doors); Referee: Kevin Stott

December 1 Conference Semifinal	Seattle Sounders FC	1–0	FC Dallas	Seattle, Washington
6:30 p.m. (PST)	O'Neill 49'; João Paulo (yellow card) 69'	Report	Bressan (yellow card) 58'; Santos (yellow card) 74'	Stadium: Lumen Field; Attendance: 0 (behind closed doors); Referee: Robert Sibiga

December 7 Conference Final	Seattle Sounders FC	3–2	Minnesota United FC	Seattle, Washington
6:30 p.m. (PST)	A. Roldan (yellow card) 9'; O'Neill (yellow card) 27'; Bruin 75'; Ruidíaz 89'; Svensson 90+3'	Report	Reynoso 29'; Dibassy (yellow card) 62', (goal) 67'	Stadium: Lumen Field; Attendance: 0 (behind closed doors); Referee: Ismail Elfath

December 12 MLS Cup 2020	Columbus Crew SC	3–0	Seattle Sounders FC	Columbus, Ohio
5:30 p.m. (PST)	Zelarayán 25', 82'; Etienne 31'	Report	João Paulo (yellow card) 27'; Smith (yellow card) 49'	Stadium: Mapfre Stadium; Attendance: 1,500; Referee: Jair Marrufo

=== CONCACAF Champions League ===
==== Round of 16 ====
February 20 First leg	Olimpia (Honduras)	2–2	(United States) Seattle Sounders FC	San Pedro Sula, Honduras
7:00 p.m. (PST)	Paz (yellow card) 19'; Troglio (yellow card) 23'; Arboleda (yellow card) 25' (goal) 63', 81'	Report	João Paulo 6'; Arreaga (yellow card) 22'; Frei (yellow card) 25'; Morris 54'	Stadium: Estadio Olímpico Metropolitano; Referee: Juan Gabriel Calderón (Costa Rica)

February 27 Second leg	Seattle Sounders FC (United States)	2–2 (4–4 agg.) (2–4 p)	(Honduras) Olimpia	Seattle, Washington
7:00 p.m. (PST)	Nouhou (yellow card) 8'; C. Roldan 21'; João Paulo 64'; Delem (yellow card) 90+2'	Report	Mejía (yellow card) 2'; Oliva 4'; Arboleda (yellow card) 37'; Pineda (yellow card) 69', (goal) 86'; Bengtson (yellow card) 79'	Stadium: CenturyLink Field; Attendance: 34,016; Referee: Iván Barton (El Salvador)
	Penalties
	Ruidíaz (penalty scored); João Paulo (penalty scored); C. Roldan (penalty missed); Leerdam (penalty missed)		(penalty scored) Arboleda; (penalty scored) Benguché; (penalty scored) Rodriguez; (penalty scored) Leverón

=== U.S. Open Cup ===
The Sounders were scheduled to enter the 2020 U.S. Open Cup in the round of 32 on May 19 or May 20 along with the twelve highest seeded teams as determined by the 2019 standings and participation in the CONCACAF Champions League. The tournament was suspended by the United States Soccer Federation on March 13, 2020, and later canceled entirely on August 17 due to the COVID-19 pandemic.

May 19/20 Round of 32	N.P.
Note: The first three rounds were temporarily suspended on March 13, 2020, due to the COVID-19 pandemic. The 2020 tournament was canceled on August 17, 2020.

=== Campeones Cup ===
As defending MLS Cup champions, the Sounders qualified to host the Campeones Cup, an exhibition match scheduled to be played on August 12 at CenturyLink Field. The opponent was to be the winner of the 2020 Campeón de Campeones, a Mexican super cup contested by the winners of the Liga MX Apertura and Clausura seasons. The match was canceled on May 19, 2020, along with the MLS All-Star Game and Leagues Cup, to prevent fixture congestion for the restarted regular season during the COVID-19 pandemic.

August 12	Seattle Sounders FC (United States)	N.P.	(Mexico) Campeón de Campeones winner	Seattle, Washington
				Stadium: CenturyLink Field
Note: Canceled due to COVID-19 pandemic.

=== MLS is Back Tournament ===
==== Group stage ====
July 10 Matchday 1 (MLS 3)	Seattle Sounders FC	0–0	San Jose Earthquakes	Bay Lake, Florida
6:00 p.m. (PDT)	Arreaga (yellow card) 24'	Report	Thompson (yellow card) 19'	Stadium: ESPN Wide World of Sports Complex; Attendance: 0 (behind closed doors); Referee: Drew Fischer

July 14 Matchday 2 (MLS 4)	Chicago Fire FC	2–1	Seattle Sounders FC	Bay Lake, Florida
6:00 a.m. (PDT)	Herbers (yellow card) 22'; Berić 52'; Pineda 84'	Report	Hopeau (yellow card) 41'; Yeimar (yellow card) 60'; Bwana 77'; Ruidíaz (yellow card) 90'	Stadium: ESPN Wide World of Sports Complex; Attendance: 0 (behind closed doors); Referee: Rosendo Mendoza

July 19 Matchday 3 (MLS 5)	Seattle Sounders FC	3–0	Vancouver Whitecaps FC	Bay Lake, Florida
7:30 p.m. (PDT)	Lodeiro 16' (pen.); Morris 34'; Leerdam (yellow card) 40'; Ruidíaz 51'	Report	Khmiri (yellow card) 16'; Reyna (yellow card) 30'	Stadium: ESPN Wide World of Sports Complex; Attendance: 0 (behind closed doors); Referee: Robert Sibiga

Group B results
Pos	Team	Pld	W	D	L	GF	GA	GD	Pts	Qualification
1	San Jose Earthquakes	3	2	1	0	6	3	+3	7	Advance to knockout stage
2	Seattle Sounders FC	3	1	1	1	4	2	+2	4	Advance to knockout stage
3	Vancouver Whitecaps FC	3	1	0	2	5	7	−2	3	Advance to knockout stage
4	Chicago Fire	3	1	0	2	2	5	−3	3	

Source: MLS

==== Knockout stage ====
July 27 Round of 16	Seattle Sounders FC	1–4	Los Angeles FC	Bay Lake, Florida
8:00 p.m. (PDT)	Bruin 75'	Report	Rossi 14' (pen.), 82'; Blessing 39'; Rodríguez 89'	Stadium: ESPN Wide World of Sports Complex; Attendance: 0 (behind closed doors); Referee: Jair Marrufo

== Players ==
For the 2020 season, the Sounders were permitted a maximum of 30 signed players on the first team, of which 10 roster positions were designated for supplemental and reserve players. A base salary cap of $4.9 million applied to the non-supplemental players with exceptions for the club's three designated players—João Paulo, Nicolás Lodeiro, and Raúl Ruidíaz—who each counted for a reduced amount. The Sounders also had eight available international slots that were filled by players from outside the United States who did not have a green card; the main roster at the start of the season had players who represented 13 nationalities.

=== Roster ===
Note: Flags indicate national team as defined under FIFA eligibility rules. Players may hold more than one non-FIFA nationality. Squad includes all players who had first team contracts or appearances during the 2020 season. Age listed for each player is calculated from December 12, 2020, the final matchday of the season.

Seattle Sounders FC first team roster
No.	Name	Nationality	Position	Age	Signed	Previous club	Base salary	Notes
1	Trey Muse	United States	GK	21	2019	Indiana Hoosiers (USA)	$73,763	HGP
2	Brad Smith	Australia	DF	26	2020	AFC Bournemouth (ENG)	$81,375	
3	Xavier Arreaga	Ecuador	DF	26	2019	Barcelona S.C. (ECU)	$393,600	International
4	Gustav Svensson	Sweden	MF	33	2017	Guangzhou R&F (CHN)	$570,000	International
5	Nouhou Tolo	Cameroon	DF	23	2017	Seattle Sounders FC 2 (USA)	$88,200	International
6	João Paulo	Brazil	MF	29	2020	Botafogo (BRA)	$1,000,000	DP; on loan
7	Cristian Roldan	United States	MF	25	2015	Washington Huskies (USA)	$660,000	
8	Jordy Delem	Martinique	MF	27	2017	Seattle Sounders FC 2 (USA)	$160,000	
9	Raúl Ruidíaz	Peru	FW	30	2018	Morelia (MEX)	$2,040,000	DP, International
10	Nicolás Lodeiro (c)	Uruguay	MF	31	2016	Boca Juniors (ARG)	$2,120,000	DP
11	Miguel Ibarra	United States	MF	30	2020	Minnesota United FC (USA)	$210,000	
13	Jordan Morris	United States	FW	26	2016	Stanford Cardinal (USA)	$1,000,000	HGP
16	Alex Roldán	El Salvador	DF	24	2018	Seattle Redhawks (USA)	$81,375	
17	Will Bruin	United States	FW	31	2017	Houston Dynamo (USA)	$425,000	
18	Kelvin Leerdam	Suriname	DF	30	2017	Vitesse (NED)	$650,000	
19	Harry Shipp	United States	MF	29	2017	Montréal Impact (CAN)	Not listed	
24	Stefan Frei	Switzerland	GK	34	2014	Toronto FC (CAN)	$500,000	
27	Shane O'Neill	United States	DF	27	2020	Orlando City SC (USA)	$81,375	
28	Yeimar Gómez Andrade	Colombia	DF	28	2020	Unión de Santa Fe (ARG)	$275,000	International
29	Román Torres	Panama	DF	34	2020	Inter Miami CF (USA)	$263,000	
30	Stefan Cleveland	United States	GK	26	2020	Chicago Fire (USA)	$81,375	
33	Joevin Jones	Trinidad and Tobago	DF	29	2019	Darmstadt 98 (GER)	$482,004	International
37	Shandon Hopeau	United States	MF	22	2020	Tacoma Defiance (USA)	$63,547	HGP
45	Ethan Dobbelaere	United States	MF	18	2020	Tacoma Defiance (USA)	$63,547	HGP
70	Handwalla Bwana	Kenya	FW	21	2018	Washington Huskies (USA)	$81,375	HGP
75	Danny Leyva	United States	MF	17	2019	Tacoma Defiance (USA)	$63,547	HGP
84	Josh Atencio	United States	MF	18	2020	Tacoma Defiance (USA)	$63,547	HGP
87	Alfonso Ocampo-Chavez	United States	MF	18	2019	Tacoma Defiance (USA)	$63,547	HGP
94	Jimmy Medranda	Colombia	DF	26	2020	Nashville SC (USA)	$170,504	
99	Justin Dhillon	United States	FW	25	2019	Tacoma Defiance (USA)	$81,375	HGP

==== On loan ====
Seattle Sounders FC players on loan
No.	Name	Nationality	Position	Age	Signed	Base salary	On loan to	Notes
15	Emanuel Cecchini	Argentina	MF	23	2019	$333,000	Unión de Santa Fe (ARG)	Until the end of the season

=== Appearances and goals ===
A total of 27 players made at least one appearance for the Sounders during the 2020 season across all competitions. Four players made appearances in all 29 of the team's matches: goalkeeper Stefan Frei, defender Nouhou Tolo, midfielder Cristian Roldan, and forward Jordan Morris. Of those Frei played all available minutes, and Roldan had the most minutes of any outfield player: 1,890 minutes during the regular season and 630 minutes in other competitions. Raúl Ruidíaz was the team's leading goalscorer in 2020 with 14 goals; captain Nicolás Lodeiro had the most assists at 13 in the regular season and playoffs.

Player statistics (all competitions)
No.	Player	Nationality	Pos.	Regular season		Playoffs		MLS is Back (knockout)		Champions League		Total		Discipline	
No.	Player	Nationality	Pos.	Apps	Goals	Apps	Goals	Apps	Goals	Apps	Goals	Apps	Goals	A yellow rectangle, denoting the yellow penalty card shown to a player being cautioned	A red rectangle, denoting the red penalty card shown to a player being sent off
1	Trey Muse	(United States) USA	GK	0	0	0	0	0	0	0	0	0	0	0	0
2	Brad Smith	(Australia) AUS	DF	5	0	4	0	0	0	0	0	9	0	1	0
3	Xavier Arreaga	(Ecuador) ECU	DF	14	0	0	0	1	0	2	0	17	0	5	0
4	Gustav Svensson	(Sweden) SWE	MF	12	0	2	1	1	0	0	0	15	1	0	0
5	Nouhou Tolo	(Cameroon) CMR	DF	22	0	4	0	1	0	2	0	29	0	1	0
6	João Paulo	(Brazil) BRA	MF	19	2	4	0	0	0	2	2	25	4	7	0
7	Cristian Roldan	(United States) USA	MF	22	2	4	0	1	0	2	1	29	3	1	0
8	Jordy Delem	(Martinique) MTQ	MF	17	0	1	0	0	0	2	0	20	0	3	0
9	Raúl Ruidíaz	(Peru) PER	FW	17	12	4	2	1	0	2	0	24	14	2	0
10	Nicolás Lodeiro	(Uruguay) URU	MF	20	7	4	1	1	0	0	0	25	8	3	0
11	Miguel Ibarra	(United States) USA	MF	12	0	0	0	0	0	1	0	13	0	0	0
13	Jordan Morris	(United States) USA	FW	22	10	4	1	1	0	2	1	29	12	1	0
16	Alex Roldán	(El Salvador) ESA	DF	18	0	4	0	0	0	1	0	23	0	2	0
17	Will Bruin	(United States) USA	FW	15	1	2	1	1	1	0	0	18	3	1	0
18	Kelvin Leerdam	(Suriname) SUR	DF	21	3	3	0	1	0	2	0	27	3	2	0
19	Harry Shipp	(United States) USA	MF	2	0	0	0	0	0	0	0	2	0	0	0
24	Stefan Frei	(Switzerland) SUI	GK	22	0	4	0	1	0	2	0	29	0	1	0
27	Shane O'Neill	(United States) USA	DF	18	0	4	1	1	0	2	0	25	1	4	0
28	Yeimar Gómez Andrade	(Colombia) COL	DF	19	2	4	0	0	0	1	0	24	2	5	0
29	Román Torres	(Panama) PAN	DF	3	0	2	0	0	0	0	0	5	0	0	0
30	Stefan Cleveland	(United States) USA	GK	0	0	0	0	0	0	0	0	0	0	0	0
33	Joevin Jones	(Trinidad and Tobago) TTO	DF	13	2	4	0	1	0	2	0	20	2	1	0
37	Shandon Hopeau	(United States) USA	MF	5	0	0	0	1	0	0	0	6	0	1	0
45	Ethan Dobbelaere	(United States) USA	MF	1	0	0	0	1	0	0	0	2	0	0	0
70	Handwalla Bwana	(Kenya) KEN	FW	5	1	1	0	1	0	0	0	7	1	0	0
75	Danny Leyva	(United States) USA	MF	2	0	0	0	0	0	1	0	3	0	0	0
84	Josh Atencio	(United States) USA	MF	5	0	0	0	1	0	0	0	6	0	0	0
87	Alfonso Ocampo-Chavez	(United States) USA	MF	0	0	0	0	0	0	0	0	0	0	0	0
94	Jimmy Medranda	(Colombia) COL	DF	2	0	1	0	0	0	0	0	3	0	0	0
99	Justin Dhillon	(United States) USA	FW	1	0	0	0	0	0	1	0	2	0	0	0

== Coaching staff ==
Technical staff
Position	Name	Nationality
Head coach	Brian Schmetzer	United States
Assistant coach	Preki	United States
Assistant coach	Gonzalo Pineda	Mexico
Assistant coach	Djimi Traoré	Mali
Director of goalkeeping	Tom Dutra	United States

== Transfers ==
The MLS season had two transfer windows during which teams were able to register new players from outside of the league and those who required an International Transfer Certificate. The primary window from February 12 to May 5 was scheduled to be followed by the secondary window from July 7 to August 5; due to the COVID-19 pandemic, the secondary window was split into a two-day window from July 6–7 for the MLS is Back Tournament and a longer window from August 12 to October 29 for the rest of the regular season. Rosters were finalized on October 21, the final day of the regular season. Between the transfer windows, teams are allowed to sign free agents or other U.S.-based players, including those traded between MLS teams for other players, general allocation money, or various league slots.

For transfers in, dates listed are when the Sounders officially signed the players to the roster. Transactions where only the rights to the players are acquired are not listed. For transfers out, dates listed are when the Sounders officially removed the players from the roster, not when they signed with another club. If a player later signed with another club, his new club will be noted, but the date listed here remains the one when he was officially removed from the Seattle Sounders FC roster.

=== In ===
Incoming transfers for Seattle Sounders FC
No.	Player	Nat.	Pos.	Previous team	Notes	Date
30	Stefan Cleveland	United States	GK	Chicago Fire FC (USA)	Traded for First Round pick (26th overall) in the 2020 MLS SuperDraft and received Second Round pick (35th overall) in the 2020 MLS SuperDraft.	November 26, 2019
27	Shane O'Neill	United States	DF	Orlando City SC (USA)	Free transfer	January 14, 2020
6	João Paulo	Brazil	MF	Botafogo (BRA)	On loan until end of season with an option for 2021	January 31, 2020
28	Yeimar Gómez Andrade	Colombia	DF	Unión de Santa Fe (ARG)	Undisclosed fee	February 5, 2020
11	Miguel Ibarra	United States	MF	Minnesota United FC (USA)	Free transfer	February 20, 2020
45	Ethan Dobbelaere	United States	MF	Seattle Sounders FC Academy (USA)	Homegrown Player	June 15, 2020
84	Josh Atencio	United States	MF	Tacoma Defiance (USA)	Homegrown Player	June 15, 2020
37	Shandon Hopeau	United States	MF	Tacoma Defiance (USA)	Homegrown Player	June 30, 2020
2	Brad Smith	Australia	DF	AFC Bournemouth (ENG)	Free transfer	September 17, 2020
29	Román Torres	Panama	DF	Inter Miami CF (USA)	Traded for a conditional first round selection in the 2021 MLS SuperDraft.	September 28, 2020
94	Jimmy Medranda	Colombia	DF	Nashville SC (USA)	Traded for Handwalla Bwana and received $225,000 in general allocation money with a potential $25,000 bonus.	October 21, 2020

==== Draft picks ====
Draft picks were not automatically signed to the team roster. Only those who are signed to a contract were listed as transfers in. Only trades involving draft picks and executed after the start of the 2020 MLS SuperDraft are listed in the notes.

2020 MLS SuperDraft picks for Seattle Sounders FC
Player	Nationality	Round	Pick	Pos.	Previous team	Notes
Danny Reynolds	England	2nd	35	DF	UNC Wilmington Seahawks (USA)	Signed with Tacoma Defiance in February.
Timo Mehlich	Germany	2nd	52	MF	UNLV Rebels (USA)	Signed contract with Rio Grande Valley FC before draft.
Julian Avila-Good	Canada	3rd	78	MF	Seattle Redhawks (USA)	

=== Out ===
Outgoing transfers for Seattle Sounders FC
No.	Player	Nat.	Pos.	New team	Notes	Date
35	Bryan Meredith	United States	GK	Inter Miami CF (USA)	Selected with the 9th pick of the MLS Expansion Draft.	November 19, 2019
3	Jonathan Campbell	United States	DF	Retired	Option declined	November 20, 2019
12	Saad Abdul-Salaam	United States	DF	FC Cincinnati (USA)	Option declined, selected in second stage of the Re-Entry Draft.	November 20, 2019
29	Román Torres	Panama	DF	Inter Miami CF (USA)	Option declined	November 20, 2019
8	Víctor Rodríguez	Spain	MF	Elche CF (ESP)	Option declined	November 20, 2019
23	Luis Silva	Mexico	FW	Unknown	Option declined	November 20, 2019
20	Kim Kee-hee	South Korea	DF	Ulsan Hyundai FC (KOR)	Out of contract	November 20, 2019
11	Brad Smith	Australia	DF	AFC Bournemouth (ENG)	Out of contract (end of loan)	November 20, 2019
15	Emanuel Cecchini	Argentina	MF	Unión de Santa Fe (ARG)	On loan through the end of the year	January 31, 2020
19	Harry Shipp	United States	MF	None	Retired	June 16, 2020
87	Alfonso Ocampo-Chavez	United States	MF	Tacoma Defiance (USA)	On loan until end of USL season	August 3, 2020
45	Ethan Dobbelaere	United States	MF	Tacoma Defiance (USA)	On loan until end of USL season	September 3, 2020
70	Handwalla Bwana	Kenya	MF	Nashville SC (USA)	Traded for Jimmy Medranda and $225,000 in general allocation money with a potential $25,000 bonus.	October 21, 2020

== Player awards ==
The attacking trio of Nicolás Lodeiro, Jordan Morris, and Raúl Ruidíaz were named to the 2020 MLS Best XI at the end of the regular season; the Sounders were one of two teams, along with Supporters' Shield winners Philadelphia Union, to have three players in the Best XI. Ruidíaz also finished as runner-up for the MLS Golden Boot with 12 regular season goals; Lodeiro's 10 assists were tied for most in the league. Lodeiro and Morris were finalists for the Landon Donovan MVP Award and finished third and fourth, respectively, in voting.

The Sounders announced their team awards, decided through votes from the team's players and technical staff, in December 2020. Morris was named the team's most valuable player, and Yeimar Gómez Andrade earned Defender of the Year. Cristian Roldan won Humanitarian of the Year for his work in several charity causes as well as initiatives to increase voter turnout and 2020 census participation; he was also a finalist for the MLS Humanitarian of the Year Award.

=== MLS Best XI ===
Player	Position	Number
Nicolás Lodeiro	MF	1st
Jordan Morris	FW	1st
Raúl Ruidíaz	FW	1st

=== MLS Player of the Week ===
Week	Player	Position	Opponent
1	Jordan Morris	FW	Chicago Fire FC
6	Raúl Ruidíaz	FW	Portland Timbers
11	Jordan Morris	FW	San Jose Earthquakes

=== MLS Goal of the Week ===
Week	Player	Opponent	Score (Result)
7 & 8	Raúl Ruidíaz	Los Angeles FC	1–0 (3–1)

=== MLS Team of the Week ===
Week	Player	Position (Note: Positions for the MLS Team of the Week may differ from the player's listed position.)	Opponent(s)
1	Jordan Morris	FW	Chicago Fire FC
MiB R3	Jordan Morris (2)	MF	Vancouver Whitecaps FC
6	Raúl Ruidíaz	FW	Portland Timbers
7 & 8	Jordan Morris (3)	MF	Los Angeles FC
11	Jordan Morris (4)	MF	San Jose Earthquakes
11	Joevin Jones	MF	San Jose Earthquakes
11	Raúl Ruidíaz (2)	FW	San Jose Earthquakes
12	Nicolás Lodeiro	MF	Los Angeles FC
14	Jordan Morris (5)	MF	Portland Timbers, LA Galaxy
14	Cristian Roldan	MF	Portland Timbers, LA Galaxy
15	João Paulo	MF	Vancouver Whitecaps FC
15	Cristian Roldan (2)	Bench	Vancouver Whitecaps FC
16	Nicolás Lodeiro (2)	MF	Real Salt Lake
16	Yeimar Gómez Andrade	DF	Real Salt Lake
21	Raúl Ruidíaz (3)	FW	Vancouver Whitecaps FC
23	Nicolás Lodeiro (3)	Bench	LA Galaxy
24	Nicolás Lodeiro (4)	Bench	San Jose Earthquakes

== Aftermath ==
Several analysts described the 2020 roster for the Sounders as the best in the team's history and able to compete for a potential championship; they finished the regular season with the second-best goal differential in MLS and third-most goals scored. During the playoffs, Brian Schmetzer said that they felt "like we've had three preseasons" due to disruptions in the schedule and that "just too many weird things that have happened and it's been tough." Following the MLS Cup, which he described as "a failure", Schmetzer said he was "very proud" of the team's performance during the season. The Seattle Times said that the Sounders "didn't play to [their] potential consistently until the postseason" and that the team's defense had "shown weakness" in the playoffs, which was exploited by Columbus.

Following the end of the season, the Sounders closed their COVID-19 relief fund after it had raised and distributed $1.1 million in grants to 785 people and 134 businesses affected by the pandemic and lack of fan traffic for home matches. During the offseason, Schmetzer signed a multi-year contract extension to remain as head coach, and sporting director and head scout Chris Henderson left the club to join Inter Miami CF. The team also lost several veteran players after their contracts had expired and planned to use more homegrown and young players to replace them through the 2021 season. Jordan Morris was loaned for six months to Welsh side Swansea City AFC in the EFL Championship, but he only played five matches before a second career anterior cruciate ligament injury in February 2021. Morris returned to Seattle for surgery and eight months of recovery, later appearing at the end of the regular season.

The Sounders began the 2021 season with a 13-match unbeaten run and finished second in the Western Conference but were eliminated in the first round of the playoffs in a penalty shootout. The club had also qualified for the 2021 Leagues Cup, a single-elimination tournament against clubs from Liga MX, as one of the top two teams in the 2020 MLS standings without a CONCACAF Champions League berth. The Sounders advanced to the final, played in the Las Vegas area, and finished as runners-up to Mexico's Club León. The 2021 season also saw the return of fans to Lumen Field for home matches, beginning with a reduced capacity of 7,000 in March and later increasing to normal capacity in July. Fans were required to present proof of COVID-19 vaccination or a negative test to enter the stadium as part of state guidelines. As of 2023, the 2020 season is the most recent MLS Cup appearance for the Sounders.
