= Xavier Arreaga =

Ecuadorian footballer (born 1994)

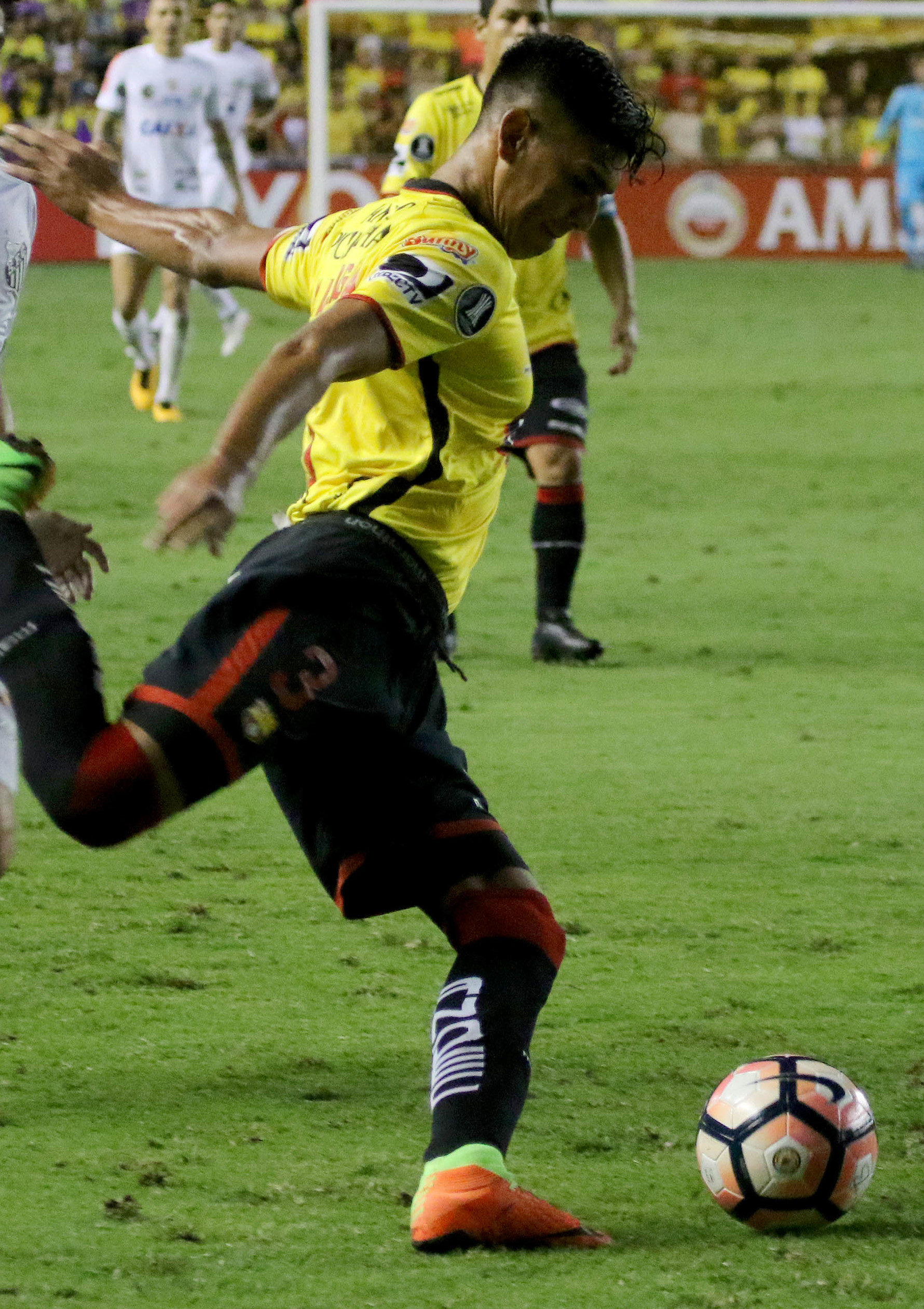
- Arreaga with Barcelona in 2017

Personal information
- Full name: Xavier Ricardo Arreaga Bermello
- Date of birth: 28 September 1994 (age 32)
- Place of birth: Guayaquil, Ecuador
- Height: 1.84 m (6 ft 0 in)
- Position: Defender

Team information
- Current team: Barcelona SC
- Number: 3

Youth career
- 2005–2012: Unión Española de Guayaquil
- 2012: Halley

Senior career*
Years	Team	Apps	(Gls)
2012	Halley	12	(0)
2012–2015	Manta	55	(3)
2015–2019	Barcelona SC	79	(8)
2019–2024	Seattle Sounders FC	101	(3)
2023	→ Tacoma Defiance (loan)	1	(0)
2024	New England Revolution	23	(0)
2025–	Barcelona SC	17	(1)

International career^{‡}
2017–	Ecuador	20	(1)
- * Club domestic league appearances and goals as of 20 August 2025 ‡ National team caps and goals as of 2 February 2022

Xavier Ricardo Arreaga Bermello (born 28 September 1994) is an Ecuadorian professional footballer who plays as a defender for Barcelona S.C. and the Ecuador national team.

He has won a MLS Cup with Seattle Sounders FC in 2019, and was named in the 2022 CONCACAF Champions League Best XI.

== Career ==
Arreaga made his debut for Ecuador on 20 November 2018 in a match against Panama.

After four seasons with Barcelona S.C. in the Ecuadorian Serie A, Arreaga was signed by the Sounders on 7 May 2019. He joined the team later that month as a replacement for retiring defender Chad Marshall and made his debut on 26 May 2019 against Sporting Kansas City.

On April 23, 2024, Arreaga was traded to the New England Revolution in return for a 2025 international roster spot and $75,000 in General Allocation Money "if certain performance metrics are met." He made his first appearance, and first start, for the Revolution on April 27, 2024, in a 4–1 loss to Inter Miami CF. Arreaga was named to the MLS matchday 22 "Team of the Matchday" alongside head coach Caleb Porter and teammate Giacomo Vrioni following the Revolution's 2–1 victory over FC Cincinnati on June 22.

New England declined Arreaga's contract option following their 2024 season.

== International career ==
Arreaga was selected in the 23-man Ecuador squad for the 2019 Copa América.

Arreaga was selected in the 28 player Ecuador squad for the 2021 Copa América.

Arreaga was named in the Ecuadorian squad for the 2022 FIFA World Cup.

== Career statistics ==
=== Club ===
As of match played 1 May 2024

Appearances and goals by club, season and competition
Club	Season	League			National cup		Continental		Other		Total	
Club	Season	Division	Apps	Goals	Apps	Goals	Apps	Goals	Apps	Goals	Apps	Goals
Manta	2014	Ecuadorian Serie A	12	0	—		—		—		12	0
Manta	2015	Ecuadorian Serie B	43	3	—		—		—		43	3
Manta	Total		55	3	—		—		—		55	3
Barcelona SC	2016	Ecuadorian Serie A	8	2	—		—		—		8	2
Barcelona SC	2017	Ecuadorian Serie A	30	3	—		9 (Note: Appearance(s) in Copa Libertadores)	0	—		39	3
Barcelona SC	2018	Ecuadorian Serie A	31	3	—		—		—		31	3
Barcelona SC	2019	Ecuadorian Serie A	10	0	0	0	2	1	—		12	1
Barcelona SC	Total		79	8	0	0	11	1	—		90	9
Seattle Sounders FC	2019	MLS	14	0	0	0	—		3 (Note: Appearance(s) in MLS Cup Playoffs)	1	17	1
Seattle Sounders FC	2020	MLS	11	0	—		2 (Note: Appearance(s) in CONCACAF Champions League)	0	4 (Note: Appearance(s) in MLS is Back)	0	17	0
Seattle Sounders FC	2021	MLS	26	2	—		—		3 (Note: Appearance(s) in Leagues Cup)	0	29	2
Seattle Sounders FC	2022	MLS	27	1	0	0	8	0	—		35	1
Seattle Sounders FC	2023	MLS	14	0	2	0	—		0	0	16	0
Seattle Sounders FC	2024	MLS	6	0	—		—		—		6	0
Seattle Sounders FC	Total		98	3	2	0	10	0	10	1	120	4
Career total			232	14	2	0	21	1	10	1	265	16

3 leagues cup 2021

=== International ===
As of 28 March 2023

Ecuador
Year	Apps	Goals
2018	1	0
2019	5	0
2020	4	1
2021	4	0
2022	4	0
2023	2	0
Total	20	1

List of international goals scored by Xavier Arreaga
No.	Date	Venue	Opponent	Score	Result	Competition
1	17 November 2020	Estadio Rodrigo Paz Delgado, Quito, Ecuador	Colombia	4–0	6–1	2022 FIFA World Cup qualification

== Honours ==
Barcelona S.C.

- Ecuadorian Serie A: 2016

Seattle Sounders FC

- MLS Cup: 2019
- CONCACAF Champions League: 2022

Individual

- CONCACAF Champions League Best XI: 2022
