= 2022 Seattle Sounders FC season =

American soccer team season

Seattle Sounders FC
2022 season
- General manager: Garth Lagerwey
- Head coach: Brian Schmetzer
- Stadium: Lumen Field
- Major League Soccer: Conference: 11th Overall: 21st
- MLS Cup playoffs: Did not qualify
- U.S. Open Cup: Round of 32
- CONCACAF Champions League: Winners
- Top goalscorer: League: Raúl Ruidíaz (9 goals); All: Nicolás Lodeiro; Raúl Ruidíaz (12 each)
- Highest home attendance: All: 68,741 (vs. UNAM, May 4, CCL Final); League: 47,722 (July 9 vs. Portland)
- Lowest home attendance: CCL: 28,932 (vs. Motagua Feb. 24); League: 30,013 (vs. Nashville Feb. 27)
- Average home league attendance: League: 33,607
- Biggest win: All: 5–0 vs. Motagua (Feb. 17, CCL); League: 4–0 vs. Vancouver (June 14)
- Biggest defeat: 0–3 vs. Portland (July 9)
Home colors	Away colors

The 2022 season was Seattle Sounders FC's 14th in Major League Soccer (MLS), the top flight of American club soccer. It was the 39th season played by a professional team bearing the Sounders name. The team was under the management of Brian Schmetzer in his sixth full MLS season as head coach of the Sounders.

In early May, the Sounders won the CONCACAF Champions League title after defeating UNAM of the Liga MX 5–2 in aggregate scoring, becoming the first team in Major League Soccer to win the CONCACAF Champions League. The season ended with the team missing the MLS Cup Playoffs for the first time in the league, snapping a 13-year streak that was the longest active streak in MLS history. The Sounders last missed the playoffs in 2006 as a second-division club in the USL First Division. The team also failed to win in their final nine road matches from July through the end of the season.

== Summary ==
During the offseason, the Sounders hired former player Andy Rose as an assistant coach, joining Freddy Juarez, who had been signed in August 2021, and Preki. The team opened their preseason camp in late January, with first scrimmages on January 20.

The Sounders won the 2022 CONCACAF Champions League (CCL) with an undefeated record, including a 3–0 win in the second leg of the final against Pumas UNAM of Liga MX. The second leg of the final at Lumen Field broke a tournament attendance record with 68,741 spectators. During their concurrent MLS matches, the team had a 2–5–1 record and dropped to 13th place in the Western Conference. The Sounders missed the MLS Cup Playoffs for the first time since entering the league in 2009, breaking a 13-year streak; their performance was attributed to player injuries from the CCL run.

== Roster ==
As of February 15, 2022

No.	Name	Nationality	Position	Date of birth (age)	Previous club
3	Xavier Arreaga (INTL)	Ecuador	DF	September 28, 1994 (age 32)	(Ecuador) Barcelona S.C.
5	Nouhou (INTL)	Cameroon	DF	June 23, 1997 (age 29)	(United States) Tacoma Defiance
6	João Paulo (INTL)	Brazil	MF	March 8, 1991 (age 35)	(Brazil) Botafogo
7	Cristian Roldan	United States	MF	June 3, 1995 (age 31)	(United States) Washington Huskies
9	Raúl Ruidíaz (DP)	Peru	FW	July 25, 1990 (age 36)	(Mexico) Atlético Morelia
10	Nicolás Lodeiro (DP)	Uruguay	MF	March 21, 1989 (age 37)	(Argentina) Boca Juniors
11	Albert Rusnák (DP)	Slovakia	MF	July 7, 1994 (age 32)	(United States) Real Salt Lake
12	Fredy Montero	Colombia	FW	July 26, 1987 (age 39)	(Canada) Vancouver Whitecaps FC
13	Jordan Morris (HG)	United States	FW	October 26, 1994 (age 32)	(United States) Stanford Cardinal
14	Samuel Adeniran	United States	FW	September 30, 1998 (age 28)	(United States) Tacoma Defiance
16	Alex Roldán	El Salvador	MF	July 28, 1996 (age 30)	(United States) Tacoma Defiance
17	Will Bruin	United States	FW	October 24, 1989 (age 37)	(United States) Houston Dynamo FC
21	Reed Baker-Whiting (HG)	United States	MF	March 31, 2005 (age 21)	(United States) Tacoma Defiance
22	Kelyn Rowe	United States	MF	December 2, 1991 (age 34)	(United States) New England Revolution
23	Léo Chú (INTL)	Brazil	MF	June 4, 2000 (age 26)	(Brazil) Grêmio
24	Stefan Frei	United States	GK	April 20, 1986 (age 40)	(Canada) Toronto FC
25	Jackson Ragen	United States	DF	September 24, 1998 (age 28)	(United States) Tacoma Defiance
26	Andrew Thomas	Russia	GK	September 1, 1998 (age 28)	(United States) Stanford Cardinal
28	Yeimar Gómez Andrade (INTL)	Colombia	DF	June 30, 1992 (age 34)	(Argentina) Unión de Santa Fe
30	Stefan Cleveland	United States	GK	May 24, 1994 (age 32)	(United States) Chicago Fire FC
45	Ethan Dobbelaere (HG)	United States	MF	November 14, 2002 (age 23)	(United States) Tacoma Defiance
73	Obed Vargas	United States	MF	August 5, 2005 (age 21)	(United States) Tacoma Defiance
75	Danny Leyva (HG)	United States	MF	May 5, 2003 (age 23)	(United States) Tacoma Defiance
84	Josh Atencio (HG)	United States	MF	January 31, 2002 (age 24)	(United States) Tacoma Defiance
87	Alfonso Ocampo-Chavez (HG)	United States	FW	March 25, 2002 (age 24)	(United States) Tacoma Defiance
92	Abdoulaye Cissoko	France	DF	December 27, 1999 (age 26)	(United States) Tacoma Defiance
94	Jimmy Medranda	Colombia	DF	February 7, 1994 (age 32)	(United States) Nashville SC
99	Dylan Teves (HG)	United States	MF	May 14, 2000 (age 26)	(United States) Washington Huskies

=== Coaching staff ===
As of January 20, 2022

Technical staff
Head coach	(United States) Brian Schmetzer
Assistant coach	(United States) Preki
Director of goalkeeping	(United States) Tom Dutra
Assistant coach	(United States) Freddy Juarez
Assistant coach	(England) Andy Rose

== Transfers ==
For transfers in, dates listed are when Sounders FC officially signed the players to the roster. Transactions where only the rights to the players are acquired are not listed. For transfers out, dates listed are when Sounders FC officially removed the players from its roster, not when they signed with another club. If a player later signed with another club, his new club will be noted, but the date listed here remains the one when he was officially removed from Sounders FC roster.

=== In ===
No.	Pos.	Player	Transferred from	Fee/notes	Date	Source
14	FW	(United States) Samuel Adeniran	(United States) Tacoma Defiance	Free Transfer	December 14, 2021	
73	MF	(United States) Obed Vargas	(United States) Tacoma Defiance	Free Transfer	December 14, 2021	
99	MF	(United States) Dylan Teves	(United States) University of Washington	Homegrown Signing	January 11, 2022	
18	MF	(Slovakia) Albert Rusnák	(United States) Real Salt Lake	Designated Player	January 13, 2022	
25	DF	(United States) Jackson Ragen	(United States) Tacoma Defiance	College Protected Period	February 14, 2022	
36	GK	(United States) Wallis Lapsley	(United States) Tacoma Defiance	Short Term Extreme Hardship Contract	March 20, 2022	
45	MF	(United States) Ethan Dobbelaere	(Czech Republic) MFK Vyškov	Loan Recall	May 7, 2022	

==== Draft picks ====
Draft picks are not automatically signed to the team roster. Only those who are signed to a contract will be listed as transfers in. Only trades involving draft picks and executed after the start of 2022 MLS SuperDraft will be listed in the notes.

Date	Player	Position	School	Notes	Ref
January 11, 2022	(France) Achille Robin	DF	(United States) University of Washington	MLS SuperDraft 2nd Round Pick (#43)	
January 11, 2022	(United States) Hal Uderitz	MF	(United States) Seattle University	MLS SuperDraft 3rd Round Pick (#76)	

=== Out ===
No.	Pos.	Player	Transferred to	Fee/notes	Date	Source
20	MF	(France) Nicolas Benezet		Option declined	December 1, 2021	
8	MF	(Martinique) Jordy Delem		Option declined	December 1, 2021	
37	MF	(United States) Shandon Hopeau		Option declined	December 1, 2021	
1	GK	(United States) Trey Muse	(United States) Loudoun United	Option declined	December 1, 2021	
27	DF	(United States) Shane O'Neill	(Canada) Toronto FC	Free transfer	December 20, 2021	
18	GK	(United States) Spencer Richey	(United States) Chicago Fire FC	Free transfer	December 22, 2021	
11	DF	(Australia) Brad Smith	(United States) D.C. United	Traded for $750,000 in GAM	January 27, 2022	
45	MF	(United States) Ethan Dobbelaere	(Czech Republic) MFK Vyškov	Loan through May 31, 2022	February 5, 2022	

== Competitions ==
Win Draw Loss Void Upcoming fixture

=== Preseason ===
The Seattle Sounders announced their pre-season schedule on January 22, 2022. Seattle competed against its rival, the Portland Timbers, in a friendly match in Tuscan as part of the Desert Showcase which was hosted by FC Tucson. The club also participated in the Coachella Valley Invitational with its host, LA Galaxy.

January 26 Desert Showcase	Seattle Sounders FC	0–0	Portland Timbers	Tucson, Arizona
6:00 p.m. (PST)		Recap		Stadium: Kino North Stadium; Attendance: 2,018; Referee: Victor Rivas
Note: This match was originally scheduled to have the Sounders competing with Real Salt Lake but RSL opted out of the match, citing scheduling conflicts and technical considerations.

February 1	Seattle Sounders FC	1–1	Colorado Rapids	Tucson, Arizona
9:45 a.m. (PST)	Ruidíaz 70'	Recap	Esteves 40'	Stadium: Kino Sports Complex; Attendance: 0 (Closed-door scrimmage)
Note: 75-minute scrimmage.

February 1	Seattle Sounders FC	0–2	Colorado Rapids	Tucson, Arizona
		Recap	Yapi 7', 21' (pen.)	Stadium: Kino Sports Complex; Attendance: 0 (Closed-door scrimmage)
Note: 75-minute scrimmage.

February 10 Coachella Valley Invitational	Seattle Sounders FC	1–1	LA Galaxy	Indio, California
11:00 AM PST	Ruidíaz 41'	Report	Joveljić 48'	Stadium: Empire Polo Club; Attendance: 0 (Closed-door scrimmage)

February 10 Coachella Valley Invitational	Seattle Sounders FC	2–4	LA Galaxy II	Indio, California
1:00 PM PST	Montero 21'; Adeniran 29'	SEA Tweet; LAG Tweet	Davila 40'; Salazar 49', 57'; Cobian 72'	Stadium: Empire Polo Club; Attendance: 0 (Closed-door scrimmage)

=== Major League Soccer ===
==== League tables ====
===== Western Conference =====
Pos	Team	Pld	W	L	T	GF	GA	GD	Pts	Qualification
9	Vancouver Whitecaps FC (Note: Canadian clubs could not qualify for the 2023 CONCACAF Champions League through the MLS regular season or playoffs.)	34	12	15	7	40	57	−17	43	Qualification for the CONCACAF Champions League (Note: as 2022 Canadian Championship winners.)
10	Colorado Rapids	34	11	13	10	46	57	−11	43	
11	Seattle Sounders FC	34	12	17	5	47	46	+1	41	
12	Sporting Kansas City	34	11	16	7	42	54	−12	40	
13	Houston Dynamo FC	34	10	18	6	43	56	−13	36	

Source: MLS
Rules for classification: 1) points; 2) total wins; 3) total goal differential; 4) total goals scored; 5) fewer disciplinary points; 6) away goal differential; 7) away goals scored; 8) home goals differential; 9) home goals scored; 10) coin toss (2 clubs tied) or drawing of lots (≥3 clubs tied)

===== Overall =====
Pos	Team	Pld	W	L	T	GF	GA	GD	Pts
19	Charlotte FC	34	13	18	3	44	52	−8	42
20	New England Revolution	34	10	12	12	47	50	−3	42
21	Seattle Sounders FC	34	12	17	5	47	46	+1	41
22	Sporting Kansas City	34	11	16	7	42	54	−12	40
23	Atlanta United FC	34	10	14	10	48	54	−6	40

Source: MLS
Rules for classification: 1) points; 2) total wins; 3) total goal differential; 4) total goals scored; 5) fewer disciplinary points; 6) away goal differential; 7) away goals scored; 8) home goals differential; 9) home goals scored; 10) coin toss (2 clubs tied) or drawing of lots (≥3 clubs tied)

==== Results ====
Overall								Home						Away					
Pld	W	D	L	GF	GA	GD	Pts	W	D	L	GF	GA	GD	W	D	L	GF	GA	GD
34	12	5	17	47	46	+1	41	9	3	5	29	19	+10	3	2	12	18	27	−9

Last updated: October 9, 2022.
Source: MLS

Matchday	1	2	3	4	5	6	7	8	9	10	11	12	13	14	15	16	17	18	19	20	21	22	23	24	25	26	27	28	29	30	31	32	33	34
Stadium	H	A	H	A	A	H	A	A	H	A	A	H	H	H	H	H	A	H	A	A	H	A	H	A	H	A	A	A	H	H	A	H	A	H
Result	L	L	W	D	W	D	L	L	W	L	W	W	L	W	D	W	L	W	L	L	L	W	L	W	L	L	D	L	L	W	W	L	L	D

Source: MLS
W = Win; D = Draw; L = Loss

== Match results ==
=== MLS regular season ===
The MLS schedule was released on December 15, 2021. Several matches were later rescheduled to accommodate CONCACAF Champions League fixtures.

February 27 1	Seattle Sounders FC	0–1	Nashville SC	Seattle, Washington
5:00 PM PST	Arreaga (yellow card) 18'; Nouhou (yellow card) 90+5'	Report	Godoy 80'	Stadium: Lumen Field; Attendance: 30,013; Referee: Alex Chilowicz

March 5 2	Real Salt Lake	1–0	Seattle Sounders FC	Sandy, Utah
3:00 PM PST	Wood 46'; Caldwell (yellow card) 70'; Löeffelsend (yellow card) 90+1'	Report	Rusnák (yellow card) 48'; Rowe (yellow card) 73'	Stadium: Rio Tinto Stadium; Attendance: 20,017; Referee: Nima Saghafi

March 12 3	Seattle Sounders FC	3–2	LA Galaxy	Seattle, Washington
12:30 PM PST	Morris 17'; Vargas (yellow card) 29'; João Paulo (yellow card) 38'; Montero 45+2' (pen.); Nouhou (yellow card) 46'; Arreaga 72'; Bruin (yellow card) 90'; A. Roldan (yellow card) 90+1'	Report	Hernández 6'; DePuy (yellow card) 44'; Cabral (yellow card) 45+4'; Douglas Costa 48'	Stadium: Lumen Field; Attendance: 33,200; Referee: Allen Chapman

March 20 4	Austin FC	1–1	Seattle Sounders FC	Austin, Texas
1:30 PM PDT	Fagúndez 70'		Bruin 43'; Ragen (yellow card) 58'; A. Roldán (yellow card) 77'	Stadium: Q2 Stadium; Attendance: 20,738; Referee: Lukasz Szpala

April 2 5	Minnesota United FC	1–2	Seattle Sounders FC	Saint Paul, Minnesota
5:00 PM PDT	Trapp (yellow card) 43'; Lod (yellow card) 56'; Boxall (yellow card) 62'; Rosales (yellow card) 74'; Reynoso 82' (pen.), (yellow card) 90+4'	Report	João Paulo 38'; Kallman 49' (o.g.); Ragen (yellow card) 71'; Rowe (yellow card) 90+5'	Stadium: Allianz Field; Attendance: 19,615; Referee: Ismail Elfath

April 16 6	Seattle Sounders FC	0–1	Inter Miami CF	Seattle, Washington
7:00 PM PDT		Report	Jean Mota (yellow card) 32'; McVey (yellow card) 40'; Robinson 41'; Gregore (yellow card) 90'; Adams (yellow card) 90+2'	Stadium: Lumen Field; Attendance: 32,126; Referee: Joseph Dickerson

April 23 7 Heritage Cup	San Jose Earthquakes	4–3	Seattle Sounders FC	San Jose, California
7:30 PM PDT	Nathan (yellow card) 11'; Espinoza 45+2', 64', 90+4'; Yueill 65'; Remedi (yellow card) 67'; Calvo (yellow card) 67'	Report	Lodeiro 14'; C. Roldan 20'; Morris 57'; Vargas (yellow card) 83'	Stadium: PayPal Park; Attendance: 12,467; Referee: Ted Unkel

May 7 8	FC Dallas	2–0	Seattle Sounders FC	Frisco, Texas
5:30 PM PDT	Ferreira 65'; Arriola (yellow card) 86' (goal) 88'	Report	Vargas (yellow card) 45+1'	Stadium: Toyota Stadium; Attendance: 19,096; Referee: Allen Chapman

May 15 9	Seattle Sounders FC	3–1	Minnesota United FC	Seattle, Washington
1:00 PM PDT	Vargas (yellow card) 10'; Arreaga (yellow card) 42'; Ruidíaz 50' (pen.); C. Roldan 74'; Yeimar (yellow card) 90+2'; Lodeiro 90+4'	Report	Lod 34'; Trapp (yellow card) 49'; Fisher (yellow card) 52'; Arriaga (yellow card) 55'; Reynoso (yellow card) 68'	Stadium: Lumen Field; Attendance: 32,613; Referee: Joseph Dickerson

May 18 10	Houston Dynamo FC	0–1	Seattle Sounders FC	Houston, Texas
5:30 PM PDT	Carrasquilla (yellow card) 11' (yellow-red card) 54'	Report	Ruidíaz 28'; Rowe (yellow card) 47'; A. Roldán (yellow card) 79' (yellow-red card) 82'	Stadium: PNC Stadium; Attendance: 11,093; Referee: Rubiel Vazquez

May 22 11	Colorado Rapids	1–0	Seattle Sounders FC	Commerce City, Colorado
5:00 PM PDT	Lewis 50'; Rosenberry (yellow card) 53'; Acosta (yellow card) 71'	Report	Vargas (yellow card) 45+1'; Yeimar (yellow card) 46'	Stadium: Dick's Sporting Goods Park; Attendance: 14,923

May 29 12	Seattle Sounders FC	2–1	Charlotte FC	Seattle, Washington
6:30 PM PDT	Morris 72'; Ruidiaz 80'; Morris (yellow card) 87'; Tolo (yellow card) 90+2'	Report	Bender 20'; Mora (yellow card) 35'; Shinyashiki (yellow card) 45+2'	Stadium: Lumen Field; Attendance: 32,763; Referee: Rosendo Mendoza

June 14 13 Cascadia Cup	Seattle Sounders FC	4–0	Vancouver Whitecaps FC	Seattle, Washington
7:30 PM PDT	Lodeiro 5' (pen.); Ruidiaz 28', 54'; A. Roldan 89'	Report	Cubas (yellow card) 65'; Alexandre (yellow card) 79'	Stadium: Lumen Field; Attendance: 31,165; Referee: Lukasz Szpala
Note: Originally scheduled to be played April 30, but was postponed due to the Sounders advancing in the 2022 CONCACAF Champions League

June 18 14	Seattle Sounders FC	1–1	Los Angeles FC	Seattle, Washington
12:00 PM PDT	Rusnák 58'; Lodeiro (yellow card) 77'; C. Roldan (yellow card) 81'	Report	Cifuentes (yellow card) 16'; Arango 79'	Stadium: Lumen Field; Attendance: 34,642; Referee: Allen Chapman

June 25 15	Seattle Sounders FC	3–0	Sporting Kansas City	Seattle, Washington
12:00 PM PDT	Bruin 8'; Morris (yellow card) 64'; Morris 71'; C. Roldan 76'	Report		Stadium: Lumen Field; Attendance: 33,380; Referee: Alex Chilowicz

June 29 16	Seattle Sounders FC	1–2	CF Montréal	Seattle, Washington
7:00 PM PDT	Morris 3'; Rowe (yellow card) 43'; Ragen (yellow card) 90+4'	Report	Toye 18', 62'; Wanyama (yellow card) 35'; Quioto (yellow card) 90+1'	Stadium: Lumen Field; Attendance: 32,375; Referee: Joseph Dickerson

July 2 17	Toronto FC	0–2	Seattle Sounders FC	Toronto, Canada
4:30 PM PDT	Salcedo (yellow card) 31'		Chú (yellow card) 14'; Tolo (yellow card) 34'; Teves 39'; Montero 60'; Lodeiro (yellow card) 70'; Leyva (yellow card) 90+2'	Stadium: BMO Field; Attendance: 23,594; Referee: Silviu Petrescu

July 9 18 Cascadia Cup	Seattle Sounders FC	0–3	Portland Timbers	Seattle, Washington
1:30 PM PDT	Ragen (yellow card) 45+2' (yellow-red card) 46'; C. Roldan (yellow card) 70'; Tolo (yellow card) 81'	Report	Williamson (yellow card) 6'; Niezgoda 24'; Y. Chará (yellow card) 57'; Moreno 82' (pen.); Asprilla 85' (yellow card) 85'; D. Chará (yellow card) 87'	Stadium: Lumen Field; Attendance: 47,722; Referee: Chris Penso

July 13 19	Nashville SC	1–0	Seattle Sounders FC	Nashville, Tennessee
5:30 PM PDT	Mukhtar 44'; Muyl (yellow card) 45+2'; Miller (yellow card) 89'	Report		Stadium: Geodis Park; Attendance: 26,927; Referee: Rubiel Vazquez

July 16 20	Chicago Fire FC	1–0	Seattle Sounders FC	Chicago, Illinois
5:00 PM PDT	Czichos 23'	Report	Rowe (yellow card) 25'	Stadium: Soldier Field; Attendance: 13,601; Referee: Pierre-Luc Lauziere

July 23 21	Seattle Sounders FC	2–1	Colorado Rapids	Seattle, Washington
7:00 PM PDT	Rowe (yellow card) 22' (yellow-red card) 47'; Morris 43'; Lodeiro 71' (pen.)	Report	Lewis 3' (yellow card) 87'; Acosta (yellow card) 32'; Vallecilla (yellow card) 43'; Barrios (yellow card) 56'; Yapi (yellow card) 90+1'	Stadium: Lumen Field; Attendance: 32,476; Referee: Rosendo Mendoza

July 29 22	Los Angeles FC	2–1	Seattle Sounders FC	Los Angeles, California
8:00 PM PDT	Opoku 35'; Vela 43'; Palacios (yellow card) 45'	Report	Murillo 14' (o.g.); Montero (yellow card) 76'; Arreaga (yellow card) 81'	Stadium: Banc of California Stadium; Attendance: 22,111; Referee: Joe Dickerson

August 2 23	Seattle Sounders FC	1–0	FC Dallas	Seattle, Washington
7:00 PM PDT	Yeimar (yellow card) 24'; Lodeiro 39' (pen.)	Report	Paes (yellow card) 39'	Stadium: Lumen Field; Attendance: 32,207; Referee: Allen Chapman

August 6 24	Atlanta United FC	2–1	Seattle Sounders FC	Atlanta, Georgia
12:00 PM PDT	Cisneros 23'; Sánchez Purata (yellow card) 89'; Gutman 90+4'	Report	C. Roldan 68'; A. Roldan (yellow card) 82'; Lodeiro (yellow card) 90+2'	Stadium: Mercedes-Benz Stadium; Attendance: 68,586; Referee: Armando Villarreal

August 14 25	Seattle Sounders FC	1–2	Real Salt Lake	Seattle, Washington
7:00 PM PDT	Yeimar (yellow card) 59'; Rusnák 62'; C. Roldan (yellow card) 70'	Report	Córdova 32'; Brody 64'; Chang (yellow card) 66'; Ruiz (yellow card) 90'	Stadium: Lumen Field; Attendance: 33,093; Referee: Timothy Ford

August 19 26	LA Galaxy	3–3	Seattle Sounders FC	Carson, California
7:00 PM PDT	Hernández 10'; Vázquez 42'; Grandsir (yellow card) 49'; Vázquez (yellow card) 58'; Joveljić 90+2'	Report	Rowe 53'; Ruidíaz 61'; Morris 73'; Lodeiro (yellow card) 74'; Leyva (yellow card) 90+1'; Medranda (yellow card) 90+6'	Stadium: Dignity Health Sports Park; Attendance: 23,278; Referee: Victor Rivas

August 26 27 Cascadia Cup	Portland Timbers	2–1	Seattle Sounders FC	Portland, Oregon
7:00 PM PDT	Blanco (yellow card) 11'; Asprilla 41'; Williamson (yellow card) 45+2'; Blanco 51'; McGraw (yellow card) 78'	Report	Yeimar 8'; Lodeiro (yellow card) 20'; Leyva (yellow card) 23'	Stadium: Providence Park; Attendance: 25,218; Referee: Geoff Gamble

August 31 28	Orlando City SC	3–2	Seattle Sounders FC	Orlando, Florida
4:30 PM PDT	Torres 53'; Carlos (yellow card) 61'; Kara 68' (pen.); Moutinho (yellow card) 90'; Smith 90+1'	Report	Rusnák 26'; A. Roldán (yellow card) 36'; Ruidíaz 52'	Stadium: Exploria Stadium; Referee: Alex Chilowicz

September 4 29	Seattle Sounders FC	2–1	Houston Dynamo FC	Seattle, Washington
6:00 PM PDT	Tolo 59'; Montero 76'; Montero (yellow card) 77'; Rusnák (yellow card) 85'	Report	Steres 26'; Dorsey (yellow card) 63'	Stadium: Lumen Field; Attendance: 33,621; Referee: Silviu Petrescu

September 10 30	Seattle Sounders FC	3–0	Austin FC	Seattle, Washington
5:00 PM PDT	Ruidíaz 12', 34'; Atencio (yellow card) 25'; A. Roldán (yellow card) 58'; Gabrielsen 68' (o.g.)	Report	Valencia (yellow card) 67'	Stadium: Lumen Field; Attendance: 34,721; Referee: Marcos de Oliveira

September 17 31 Cascadia Cup	Vancouver Whitecaps FC	2–1	Seattle Sounders FC	Vancouver, Canada
7:00 PM PDT	Vite 37'; Gressel 37'	Report	A. Roldán (yellow card) 25'; Lodeiro (yellow card) 81'; Bruin 89'	Stadium: BC Place; Attendance: 19,722; Referee: Ramy Touchan

September 27 32	Seattle Sounders FC	1–1	FC Cincinnati	Seattle, Washington
7:00 PM PDT	Ragen (yellow card) 53'; Montero 58'; Rowe (red card); Bruin (yellow card) 83'	Report	Brenner 24'; Nwobodo (yellow card) 69'; Acosta (yellow card) 72'	Stadium: Lumen Field; Attendance: 31,291; Referee: Rubiel Vazquez
Note: Originally scheduled to be played April 6, but was postponed due to the Sounders advancing in the 2022 CONCACAF Champions League

October 2 33	Sporting Kansas City	1–0	Seattle Sounders FC	Kansas City, Kansas
2:00 PM PDT	Thommy (yellow card) 28'; Agada 41'	Report	Arreaga (yellow card) 49'; Atencio (yellow card) 77'	Stadium: Children's Mercy Park; Attendance: 19,439; Referee: Ted Unkel

October 9 34 Heritage Cup	Seattle Sounders FC	2–2	San Jose Earthquakes	Seattle, Washington
2:00 PM PDT	Lodeiro 1', 49'; Rusnák (yellow card) 42'	Report	Ebobisse 4'; Rodrigues (yellow card) 52'; Cowell 75'	Stadium: Lumen Field; Attendance: 33,910; Referee: Marcos de Oliveira

=== U.S. Open Cup ===
The Sounders entered the 2022 U.S. Open Cup in the Round of 32 on May 11, 2022, by virtue of finishing second in the 2021 Western Conference. The draw occurred on April 22, 2022.

May 11 Round of 32	Seattle Sounders FC (Washington (state))	2–2 (a.e.t.) (9–10 p)	(California) San Jose Earthquakes	Tukwila, Washington
7:00 PM (PDT)	Medranda (yellow card) 26' (goal) 54'; Ragen (yellow card) 63'; Montero (yellow card) 68' (goal) 77'; Adeniran (yellow card) 95'; Cissoko (yellow card) 120+2'		Skahan 10' (pen.) (yellow card) 30'; Kikanovic (yellow card) 48'; Calvo (yellow card) 49'; Cowell 50'; Ågren (yellow card) 62'; Beason (yellow card) 72'	Stadium: Starfire Sports Complex; Attendance: 3,773; Referee: Esad Omanovic
	Penalties
	Montero (penalty scored); Cissoko (penalty scored); Chú (penalty missed); Teves (penalty scored); Adeniran (penalty scored); Rowe (penalty scored); Ragen (penalty scored); Atencio (penalty scored); Vargas (penalty scored); Nouhou (penalty scored); Cleveland (penalty missed)		(penalty scored) Espinoza; (penalty missed) Yueill; (penalty scored) Ebobisse; (penalty scored) Calvo; (penalty scored) Monteiro; (penalty scored) M. López; (penalty scored) Beason; (penalty scored) Skahan; (penalty scored) Ågren; (penalty scored) Remedi; (penalty scored) Bersano

=== CONCACAF Champions League ===
The Sounders qualified to the round of 16 of the 2022 CONCACAF Champions League by virtue of their second-place finish in the 2021 Western Conference. The round of 16 draw occurred on December 15.

==== Round of 16 ====
February 17 First leg	Motagua (Honduras)	0–0	(United States) Seattle Sounders FC	Tegucigalpa, Honduras
6:00 PM (PST)	Baldunciel (yellow card) 58'	Report	Rowe (yellow card) 77'	Stadium: Estadio Tiburcio Carías Andino; Attendance: 0 Referee: Luis Enrique Santander
Note: Following several security incidents that occurred during the first leg of the 2021 CONCACAF League Final, the CONCACAF Disciplinary Committee decided that FC Motagua must play its next three CONCACAF Club Competition home games behind closed doors. This included home matches in the CONCACAF League or CONCACAF Champions League.

February 24 Second leg	Seattle Sounders FC (United States)	5–0 (5–0 agg.)	(Honduras) Motagua	Seattle, Washington
7:30 PM (PST)	Lodeiro 33'; C. Roldan 47'; Morris 56'; Rowe 62'; Chú 74'; Arreaga (yellow card) 85'		Cr. Meléndez (yellow card) 4'	Stadium: Lumen Field; Attendance: 28,932; Referee: Iván Barton

==== Quarter-finals ====
March 8 First leg	Seattle Sounders FC (United States)	3–0	(Mexico) León	Seattle, Washington
7:00 PM (PST)	Nouhou (yellow card) 18'; Montero 31' (pen.), 39'; Morris 90'	Report	Tesillo (yellow card) 86'	Stadium: Lumen Field; Attendance: 29,196; Referee: Bryan López

March 17 Second leg	León (Mexico)	1–1 (1–4 agg.)	(United States) Seattle Sounders FC	León, Mexico
5:30 PM (PDT)	Kagelmacher (yellow card) 64'; Ambríz 90+1'	Report	Montero 45+3' (pen.); Nouhou (yellow card) 57'; Vargas (yellow card) 72'	Stadium: Estadio León; Attendance: 23,572; Referee: José Torres

==== Semi-finals ====
April 6 First leg	Seattle Sounders FC (United States)	3–1	(United States) New York City FC	Seattle, Washington
7:00 PM (PDT)	Rusnák 16'; Morris 34'; Lodeiro 68' (pen.); Arreaga (yellow card) 80'	Report	Andrade 27'; Morales (yellow card) 79'	Stadium: Lumen Field; Attendance: 31,074; Referee: Luis Enrique Santander

April 13 Second leg	New York City FC (United States)	1–1 (2–4 agg.)	(United States) Seattle Sounders FC	Harrison, New Jersey
6:00 PM (PDT)	Castellanos (yellow card) 2'; Rodríguez 51' (yellow card) 90+1'; Callens (yellow card) 90+6'	Report	Ruidíaz 21'; Ragen (yellow card) 45+1'; Frei (yellow card) 84'	Stadium: Red Bull Arena; Attendance: 6,413; Referee: Daneon Parchment
Note: New York City FC's home stadium, Yankee Stadium, as well as its second choice venue, Citi Field, are unavailable because they are not CONCACAF approved venues, requiring the match to be played at Red Bull Arena.

==== Final ====
April 27 First leg	UNAM (Mexico)	2–2	(United States) Seattle Sounders FC	Mexico City, Mexico
7:30 PM (PDT)	Dinenno 38' (pen.) 48'; Talavera (yellow card) 90+8'; Corozo (yellow card) 90+8'; López (yellow card) 90+10'		Yeimar (yellow card) 35'; Lodeiro 77' (pen.) 90+9' (pen.); C. Roldan (yellow card) 83'	Stadium: Estadio Olímpico Universitario; Attendance: 42,617; Referee: Iván Barton

May 4 Second leg	Seattle Sounders FC (United States)	3–0 (5–2 agg.)	(Mexico) UNAM	Seattle, Washington
7:00 PM (PDT)	Ruidíaz 45', 80'; Rusnák (yellow card) 57'; Lodeiro 88' (yellow card) 89'	Report	Galindo (yellow card) 6'; López (yellow card) 34'	Stadium: Lumen Field; Attendance: 68,741; Referee: Saíd Martínez

== Statistics ==
No.	Pos	Nat	Player	Total		MLS		U.S. Open Cup		CONCACAF Champions League	
No.	Pos	Nat	Player	Apps	Goals	Apps	Goals	Apps	Goals	Apps	Goals
Goalkeepers
24	GK	(Switzerland) SUI	Stefan Frei	10	0	4	0	0	0	6	0
26	GK	(Russia) RUS	Andrew Thomas	0	0	0	0	0	0	0	0
30	GK	(United States) USA	Stefan Cleveland	2	0	2	0	0	0	0	0
Defenders
3	DF	(Ecuador) ECU	Xavier Arreaga	12	1	6	1	0	0	6	0
5	DF	(Cameroon) CMR	Nouhou	10	0	3+2	0	0	0	4+1	0
16	DF	(El Salvador) ESA	Alex Roldan	12	0	5+1	0	0	0	6	0
25	DF	(United States) USA	Jackson Ragen	9	0	3+1	0	0	0	3+2	0
28	DF	(Colombia) COL	Yeimar Gómez Andrade	6	0	2+1	0	0	0	3	0
92	DF	(France) FRA	Abdoulaye Cissoko	6	0	2+3	0	0	0	0+1	0
94	DF	(Colombia) COL	Jimmy Medranda	2	0	1	0	0	0	0+1	0
Midfielders
6	MF	(Brazil) BRA	João Paulo	10	1	5	1	0	0	4+1	0
7	MF	(United States) USA	Cristian Roldan	12	1	4+2	0	0	0	6	1
10	MF	(Uruguay) URU	Nicolás Lodeiro	7	2	1+2	0	0	0	4	2
18	MF	(Slovakia) SVK	Albert Rusnák	12	1	5+1	0	0	0	6	1
21	MF	(United States) USA	Reed Baker-Whiting	1	0	1	0	0	0	0	0
22	MF	(United States) USA	Kelyn Rowe	12	1	3+3	0	0	0	3+3	1
45	MF	(United States) USA	Ethan Dobbelaere	0	0	0	0	0	0	0	0
73	MF	(United States) USA	Obed Vargas	12	0	4+2	0	0	0	3+3	0
75	MF	(United States) USA	Danny Leyva	4	0	1+1	0	0	0	0+2	0
84	MF	(United States) USA	Josh Atencio	2	0	1+1	0	0	0	0	0
99	MF	(United States) USA	Dylan Teves	0	0	0	0	0	0	0	0
Forwards
9	FW	(Peru) PER	Raúl Ruidíaz	6	1	0+2	0	0	0	4	1
12	FW	(Colombia) COL	Fredy Montero	10	4	3+2	1	0	0	2+3	3
13	FW	(United States) USA	Jordan Morris	11	4	3+2	1	0	0	6	3
14	FW	(United States) USA	Samuel Adeniran	2	0	1	0	0	0	0+1	0
17	FW	(United States) USA	Will Bruin	7	1	3+1	1	0	0	0+3	0
23	FW	(Brazil) BRA	Léo Chú	6	1	3+2	0	0	0	0+1	1
87	FW	(United States) USA	Alfonso Ocampo-Chavez	0	0	0	0	0	0	0	0
Players transferred/loaned out during the season
36	GK	(United States) USA	Wallis Lapsley	0	0	0	0	0	0	0	0

Last updated: April 17, 2022.
Source: Sounders FC

=== Top scorers ===
Rank	Position	Number	Name	MLS	MLS Playoffs	U.S. Open Cup	CONCACAF Champions League	Total
1	FW	9	(Peru) Raúl Ruidíaz	9	0	0	3	12
1	MF	10	(Uruguay) Nicolás Lodeiro	7	0	0	5	12
3	FW	13	(United States) Jordan Morris	7	0	0	3	10
4	FW	12	(Colombia) Fredy Montero	4	0	1	3	8
5	MF	7	(United States) Cristian Roldan	4	0	0	1	5
6	MF	11	(Slovakia) Albert Rusnák	3	0	0	1	4
7	FW	17	(United States) Will Bruin	3	0	0	0	3
8	MF	22	(United States) Kelyn Rowe	1	0	0	1	2
9	DF	3	(Ecuador) Xavier Arreaga	1	0	0	0	1
9	MF	6	(Brazil) João Paulo	1	0	0	0	1
9	DF	16	(El Salvador) Alex Roldan	1	0	0	0	1
9	MF	99	(United States) Dylan Teves	1	0	0	0	1
9	DF	28	(Colombia) Yeimar Gómez Andrade	1	0	0	0	1
9	DF	5	(Cameroon) Nouhou	1	0	0	0	1
9	FW	23	(Brazil) Léo Chú	0	0	0	1	1
9	MF	94	(Colombia) Jimmy Medranda	0	0	1	0	1

- Last updated: October 10, 2022

=== Top assists ===
Rank	Position	Number	Name	MLS	MLS Playoffs	U.S. Open Cup	CONCACAF Champions League	Total
1	MF	7	(United States) Cristian Roldan	1	0	0	4	5
2	MF	10	(Uruguay) Nicolás Lodeiro	1	0	0	1	2
3	DF	5	(Cameroon) Nouhou	0	0	0	1	1
3	MF	11	(Slovakia) Albert Rusnák	0	0	0	1	1
3	DF	16	(El Salvador) Alex Roldan	1	0	0	0	1

- Last updated: April 17, 2022

== Honors and awards ==
=== MLS Team of the Week ===
Week	Player	Opponent	Position	Ref
3	(Ecuador) Xavier Arreaga	LA Galaxy	Bench	
4	(United States) Cristian Roldan	Austin FC	MF	
5	(Brazil) João Paulo	Minnesota United FC	MF	

=== MLS Goal of the Week ===
Week	Player	Opponent	Ref
5	(Brazil) João Paulo	Minnesota United FC	
11	(United States) Cristian Roldan	Minnesota United FC	
12	(Peru) Raúl Ruidíaz	Houston Dynamo FC	

=== CONCACAF Champions League Best XI ===
Leg	Player	Opponent	Position	Ref
Round of 16 2nd leg	(United States) Cristian Roldan	Motagua	MF	
Quarterfinals 1st leg	(Colombia) Fredy Montero	Club León	FW	
Quarterfinals 1st leg	(United States) Cristian Roldan	Club León	MF	
Quarterfinals 2nd leg	(Colombia) Fredy Montero	Club León	MF	
Semifinals 1st leg	(Peru) Raúl Ruidíaz	New York City FC	FW	
Semifinals 1st leg	(Uruguay) Nicolás Lodeiro	New York City FC	MF	
Semifinals 1st leg	(United States) Jordan Morris	New York City FC	MF	
Semifinals 1st leg	(Slovakia) Albert Rusnák	New York City FC	MF	
Semifinals 1st leg	(United States) Jackson Ragen	New York City FC	DF	
Semifinals 1st leg	(El Salvador) Alex Roldan	New York City FC	DF	
Semifinals 1st leg	(Switzerland) Stefan Frei	New York City FC	GK	
Semifinals 2nd leg	(Peru) Raúl Ruidíaz	New York City FC	FW	
Semifinals 2nd leg	(United States) Cristian Roldan	New York City FC	MF	
Semifinals 2nd leg	(Ecuador) Xavier Arreaga	New York City FC	DF	
Semifinals 2nd leg	(Cameroon) Nouhou	New York City FC	DF	
Semifinals 2nd leg	(Switzerland) Stefan Frei	New York City FC	GK	
