= 2017 Seattle Sounders FC 2 season =

Seattle Sounders FC 2
2017 season
- General manager: Kurt Schmid
- Head coach: Ezra Hendrickson
- Stadium: Starfire Sports Complex
- USL: Conference: 12th
- USL Playoffs: DNQ
- Top goalscorer: League: Zach Mathers (10); All: Zach Mathers (10)
- Highest home attendance: 1,307 (6/3 vs. LA)
- Lowest home attendance: 951 (7/20 vs. SPR)
- Average home league attendance: 1,034
- Biggest win: SEA 3–0 LA (6/3); SEA 3–0 VAN (8/13)
- Biggest defeat: RNO 6–0 SEA (5/20)
Home colors	Away colors	Third colors

The 2017 Seattle Sounders FC 2 season was the club's third year of existence, and their third season in the United Soccer League, the second tier of the United States Soccer Pyramid. Including previous Seattle Sounders franchises, it was the 37th season of a soccer team playing in the Seattle metro area.

== Roster ==
Note: Flags indicate national team as defined under FIFA eligibility rules; some limited exceptions apply. Players may hold more than one non-FIFA nationality. Squad correct as of September 14, 2017.

No.	Pos.	Nation	Player
1	GK	USA	Tyler Miller
5	DF	CMR	Nouhou Tolo
12	FW	USA	Seyi Adekoya
23	MF	USA	Henry Wingo
30	FW	ANT	Javorn Stevens
31	MF	USA	Lorenzo Ramos
32	MF	USA	Zach Mathers
34	DF	USA	Brian Nana-Sinkam
35	GK	USA	Bryan Meredith
36	DF	HAI	Denso Ulysse
37	FW	USA	Shandon Hopeau
40	MF	USA	Azriel Gonzalez
41	MF	AUS	Jamie Dimitroff
42	MF	USA	Kei Tomozawa
43	MF	USA	Paul Rothrock
44	DF	USA	Stirling Russell II
45	MF	COL	Camilo Santiago
47	DF	USA	Christian Koontz
51	FW	USA	Milo Barton
52	DF	USA	Jake Morris
53	DF	USA	Sam Rogers
54	DF	USA	Joe Hafferty
58	DF	USA	Ethan Lotenero
59	DF	USA	Jackson Ragen
60	GK	USA	Trey Muse
61	GK	USA	Cody Lang
64	GK	USA	Sam Fowler
70	MF	CMR	Guy Serge Edoa
71	FW	USA	David Olsen
73	DF	USA	Riley Grant
77	MF	PAN	Francisco Narbón
78	MF	ZAM	Charles Renken
88	MF	USA	Ray Saari
92	DF	CMR	Rodrigue Ele
96	DF	AUS	Steve Whyte
99	FW	CMR	Felix Chenkam
—	GK	USA	Cody Lang

Signed to first team contract with Sounders FC.
Sounders FC Academy player.

== Competitions ==
=== USL regular season ===
==== Standings ====
Pos	Team	Pld	W	D	L	GF	GA	GD	Pts
10	Orange County SC	32	11	10	11	43	47	−4	43
11	Rio Grande Valley Toros	32	9	8	15	37	50	−13	35
12	Seattle Sounders 2	32	9	4	19	42	61	−19	31
13	LA Galaxy II	32	8	5	19	32	64	−32	29
14	Vancouver Whitecaps 2	32	5	9	18	32	52	−20	24

Source: 2017 USL standings
Rules for classification: 1) total wins; 2) total goal differential; 3) total goals scored; 4) points earned against top four Conference finishers; 5) disciplinary points; 6) coin toss or drawing of lots

==== Results summary ====
Overall								Home						Away					
Pld	W	D	L	GF	GA	GD	Pts	W	D	L	GF	GA	GD	W	D	L	GF	GA	GD
32	9	4	19	42	61	−19	31	5	3	8	25	25	0	4	1	11	17	36	−19

Source: USL

==== Results by matchday ====
Matchday	1	2	3	4	5	6	7	8	9	10	11	12	13	14	15	16	17	18	19	20	21	22	23	24	25	26	27	28	29	30	31	32
Stadium	H	H	A	A	H	H	A	H	A	A	H	H	A	H	A	A	A	H	H	A	A	H	H	A	H	A	H	H	H	A	A	A
Result	L	W	L	W	L	L	W	W	D	L	D	W	L	W	L	W	L	L	L	L	L	L	W	W	L	L	D	D	L	L	L	L

Source: USL
A = Away; H = Home; W = Win; D = Draw; L = Loss

==== Matches ====
Win Draw Loss Upcoming fixture

March 26, 2017 USL 1	Seattle Sounders FC 2	1–2	Sacramento Republic FC	Tukwila, Washington
14:00 (PDT)	Nana-Sinkam 5'; Narbón (yellow card) 39'	Recap; Boxscore	Ochoa (yellow card) 61', (goal) 65'; Barrera (yellow card) 71'; Klimenta 83'	Stadium: Starfire Sports Complex; Attendance: 1,115; Referee: Baboucarr Jallow

April 2, 2017 USL 2	Seattle Sounders FC 2	2–1	Portland Timbers 2	Tukwila, Washington
14:00 (PDT)	Saari (yellow card) 53'; Adekoya 64'; Mathers 66'	Recap; Boxscore	Bijev 51'; Damraoui (yellow card) 61'; Batista (yellow card) 63'; Clarke (yellow card) 71'; Brett (yellow card) 81'	Stadium: Starfire Sports Complex; Attendance: 965; Referee: Chipalo Street

April 8, 2017 USL 3	Vancouver Whitecaps FC 2	3–0	Seattle Sounders FC 2	Vancouver, British Columbia
15:00 (PDT)	Wynne 13'; Seiler (yellow card) 57'; Amanda (yellow card) 77'; Thoma 86'; McKendry 90+4'	Recap; Boxscore	Parra (yellow card) 23'	Stadium: McLeod Athletic Park; Attendance: 738; Referee: Alain Ruch

April 15, 2017 USL 4	LA Galaxy II	1–2	Seattle Sounders FC 2	Carson, California
19:30 (PDT)	Zanga (yellow card) 16'; Zubak 45'; Juarez (yellow card) 51'; Diallo (yellow card) 54'; Arellano (yellow card) 70'; Fujii (yellow card) 72'	Recap; Boxscore	Chenkam 7' (yellow card) 19'; Nouhou 12'; Saari (yellow card) 46'	Stadium: StubHub Center – Track Stadium; Attendance: 977; Referee: Michael Radchuk

April 22, 2017 USL 5	Seattle Sounders FC 2	1–3	Real Monarchs SLC	Tukwila, Washington
19:00 (PDT)	Chenkam (yellow card) 27'; Olsen 48'; Saari (yellow card) 55'; Parra (yellow card) 80'	Recap; Boxscore	Hoffman 35' (pen.); Hernández 67'; Besler 73'; Leal (yellow card) 80'; Minter (yellow card) 84'	Stadium: Starfire Sports Complex; Attendance: 973; Referee: Katja Koroleva

April 25, 2017 USL 6	Seattle Sounders FC 2	2–3	San Antonio FC	Tukwila, Washington
19:30 (PDT)	Mathers (yellow card) 52', (goal) 75' (pen.); Rogers 55'; Ulysse (yellow card) 72'; Parra (yellow card) 81'; Gonzalez (red card) 90+2'	Recap; Boxscore	Ajeakwa 13'; Herivaux (yellow card) 16'; Forbes 24'; Cochrane (yellow card) 28'; Ibeagha (yellow card) 61'; Vega 69'; Elizondo (yellow card) 90'	Stadium: Starfire Sports Complex; Attendance: 972; Referee: Edvin Jurisevic

April 29, 2017 USL 7	Colorado Springs Switchbacks FC	2–3	Seattle Sounders FC 2	Colorado Springs, Colorado
17:00 (PDT)	Eboussi (red card) 18'; Malcolm (yellow card) 30'; Perez 40'; Burt 70'; Kacher (yellow card) 83'	Recap; Boxscore	Nana-Sinkam (yellow card) 23'; Parra 21' (pen.); Chenkam 51', 54'; Narbón (yellow card) 90+5'	Stadium: Weidner Field; Attendance: 1,482; Referee: Victor Rivas

May 5, 2017 USL 8	Seattle Sounders FC 2	2–0	Portland Timbers 2	Tukwila, Washington
19:30 (PDT)	Parra 6' (pen.), 52', (yellow card) 55'; Narbón (yellow card) 38'; Ele (yellow card) 39'	Recap; Boxscore	Batista (yellow card) 64'; Damraoui (yellow card) 72'	Stadium: Starfire Sports Complex; Attendance: 1,146; Referee: Farhad Dadkho

May 13, 2017 USL 9	San Antonio FC	0–0	Seattle Sounders FC 2	San Antonio, Texas
17:30 (PDT)	Reed (yellow card) 30'; Newnam (yellow card) 45+1'; Castillo (yellow card) 81'; Araujo (yellow card) 90+2'	Recap; Boxscore	Ulysse (yellow card) 37'; Saari (yellow card) 87'; Ele (yellow card) 90+2'	Stadium: Toyota Field; Attendance: 8,005; Referee: Rosendo Mendoza

May 20, 2017 USL 10	Reno 1868 FC	6–0	Seattle Sounders FC 2	Reno, Nevada
19:30 (PDT)	Kelly 28', 32' (pen.), 35' (pen.); Mfeka 44'; Casiple 48'; Ockford (yellow card) 80', (goal) 90+2'	Recap; Boxscore	Ele (yellow card) 30' (yellow-red card) 34'	Stadium: Greater Nevada Field; Attendance: 5,711; Referee: Chipalo Street

May 28, 2017 USL 11	Seattle Sounders FC 2	2–2	Sacramento Republic FC	Tukwila, Washington
14:00 (PDT)	Mathers (yellow card) 30'; Nana-Sinkam 78'; Olsen 86'	Recap; Boxscore	James (yellow card) 45+3'; Hall (yellow card) 49'; Caesar 59'; Christian (yellow card) 77'; Blackwood 90+3'	Stadium: Starfire Sports Complex; Attendance: 995; Referee: Malik Badawi

June 3, 2017 USL 12	Seattle Sounders FC 2	3–0	LA Galaxy II	Tukwila, Washington
19:00 (PDT)	Parra (yellow card) 37', (goal) 61', 74'; Saari 69'	Recap; Boxscore	Castellanos (yellow card) 68'; Engola (yellow card) 70'; Zanga (yellow card) 80'; Vera (yellow card) 90+1'	Stadium: Starfire Sports Complex; Attendance: 1,307; Referee: Baboucarr Jallow

June 10, 2017 USL 13	Rio Grande Valley FC Toros	3–1	Seattle Sounders FC 2	Edinburg, Texas
17:30 (PDT)	James 16', (yellow card) 19'; Luna 62'; Magalhaes 65'	Recap; Boxscore	Grant 45+2', (yellow card) 64'; Olsen (yellow card) 74'; Dimitroff (yellow card) 85'	Stadium: H-E-B Park; Attendance: 7,999; Referee: Timothy Ford

June 19, 2017 USL 14	Seattle Sounders FC 2	3–2	OKC Energy FC	Tukwila, Washington
19:30 (PDT)	Mathers 13', 39' (pen.); Parra (yellow card) 33'; Saari (yellow card) 35' (yellow-red card) 90+4'; Olsen 90'	Recap; Boxscore	M. González (red card) 38'; Andrews (yellow card) 54'; Dixon 70'; Daly (yellow card) 76'; Guzmán (yellow card) 78'; Craven 86' (pen.)	Stadium: Starfire Sports Complex; Attendance: 963; Referee: Chipalo Street

June 24, 2017 USL 15	Orange County SC	4–3	Seattle Sounders FC 2	Irvine, California
17:00 (PDT)	Meeus 10'; Koontz 18' (o.g.); Alvarez 24'; Stevanovic (yellow card) 59'; Villalobos 80'	Recap; Boxscore	Grant (yellow card) 17'; Nana-Sinkam 47'; Ramos (yellow card) 64'; Mathers 72' (pen.); Renken 87'; Santiago (yellow card) 90+5'	Stadium: Orange County Great Park; Attendance: 2,083; Referee: Joseph Dickerson

July 1, 2017 USL 16	Vancouver Whitecaps FC 2	0–2	Seattle Sounders FC 2	Vancouver, British Columbia
15:00 (PDT)	Ma. Baldisimo (yellow card) 18'; Norman (yellow card) 37'; Bartman (yellow card) 39' de Wit (yellow card) 90+2'	Recap; Boxscore	Saari 31'; Mathers 60'	Stadium: McLeod Athletic Park; Attendance: 923; Referee: Juan Márquez

July 8, 2017 USL 17	Real Monarchs SLC	4–1	Seattle Sounders FC 2	Sandy, Utah
18:00 (PDT)	Saucedo 31', 73'; Hoffman 40'; Lachowecki 45+2'	Recap; Boxscore	Koontz (yellow card) 15'; Rothrock 77'; Tomozawa (yellow card) 79'	Stadium: Rio Tinto Stadium; Attendance: 1,637; Referee: Daniel Radford

July 16, 2017 USL 18	Seattle Sounders FC 2	1–2	Orange County SC	Tukwila, Washington
14:00 (PDT)	Olsen 30'; Ele (yellow card) 41'; Ramos (yellow card) 65'	Recap; Boxscore	Fernandes 16'; Etim 37'	Stadium: Starfire Sports Complex; Attendance: 1,112; Referee: Younes Marrakchi

July 20, 2017 USL 19	Seattle Sounders FC 2	0–2	Swope Park Rangers	Tukwila, Washington
19:30 (PDT)	Renken (yellow card) 36'	Recap; Boxscore	Musa (yellow card) 31'; Moloto 47'; Storm (yellow card) 61'; Selbol 47'	Stadium: Starfire Sports Complex; Attendance: 951; Referee: Katja Koroleva

July 23, 2017 USL 20	Sacramento Republic FC	2–0	Seattle Sounders FC 2	Sacramento, California
20:00 (PDT)	Caesar 16'; Christian (yellow card) 46'; Heath (yellow card) 56'; Blackwood 60'; Ochoa (yellow card) 69'	Recap; Boxscore	Saari (yellow card) 49'; Ragen (yellow card) 71'; Narbón (yellow card) 90+2'	Stadium: Bonney Field; Attendance: 11,569; Referee: Timothy Ford

July 29, 2017 USL 21	Colorado Springs Switchbacks FC	2–1	Seattle Sounders FC 2	Colorado Springs, Colorado
17:00 (PDT)	Malcolm 21'; Narbón 33' (o.g.); Kim (yellow card) 52'; Armstrong (yellow card) 88'	Recap; Boxscore	Mathers 51'	Stadium: Weidner Field; Attendance: 4,042; Referee: Malik Badawi

August 6, 2017 USL 22	Seattle Sounders FC 2	3–4	Rio Grande Valley FC Toros	Tukwila, Washington
18:30 (PDT)	Chenkam 10'; Mathers 36'; Narbón 42'; Koontz (yellow card) 54'; Saari (yellow card) 57'	Recap; Boxscore	Murphy 23'; Bilyeu (yellow card) 49'; James 52'; Escalante 61'; Holland 68'; Casner (yellow card) 83'	Stadium: Starfire Sports Complex; Attendance: 965; Referee: Levi Rippy

August 13, 2017 USL 23	Seattle Sounders FC 2	3–0	Vancouver Whitecaps FC 2	Tukwila, Washington
18:30 (PDT)	Parra 21', (yellow card) 21'; Mathers 38', (yellow card) 69'; Chenkam 51'	Recap; Boxscore	Bevan (red card) 84'	Stadium: Starfire Sports Complex; Attendance: 969; Referee: Chipalo Street

August 17, 2017 USL 24	Portland Timbers 2	1–2	Seattle Sounders FC 2	Portland, Oregon
19:30 (PDT)	Clarke (yellow card) 28'; Tuiloma (yellow card) 56', (goal) 63'; Batista (yellow card) 58'	Recap; Boxscore	Koontz (yellow card) 31'; Rogers 58', (yellow card) 76'; Wingo 72'; Edoa (yellow card) 83'	Stadium: Providence Park; Attendance: 2,200; Referee: Michael Radchuk

August 30, 2017 USL 25	Seattle Sounders FC 2	0–1	Tulsa Roughnecks FC	Tukwila, Washington
19:30 (PDT)	Mathers (yellow card) 76'	Recap; Boxscore	Fernandez (yellow card) 19'; Rivas (yellow card) 70'; Ugarte 72'	Stadium: Starfire Sports Complex; Attendance: 1,011; Referee: Jeff Arthurholtz

September 2, 2017 USL 26	Phoenix Rising FC	2–0	Seattle Sounders FC 2	Scottsdale, Arizona
19:30 (PDT)	Cortez (yellow card) 43'; Dia 78'; Johnson 90+4'	Recap; Boxscore	Alfaro (yellow card) 10'; Chenkam (yellow card) 28'; Delem (yellow card) 83'	Stadium: Phoenix Rising Soccer Complex; Attendance: 6,150; Referee: Farhad Dadkho

September 9, 2017 USL 27	Seattle Sounders FC 2	1–1	Reno 1868 FC	Tukwila, Washington
19:00 (PDT)	Mathers 1'; Ele (yellow card) 24'	Recap; Boxscore	Ockford (yellow card) 21'; Brown 38'; Pelosi (yellow card) 85'	Stadium: Starfire Sports Complex; Attendance: 1,129; Referee: Mike Hohnholz

September 16, 2017 USL 28	Seattle Sounders FC 2	1–1	Colorado Springs Switchbacks FC	Tukwila, Washington
19:00 (PDT)	Wingo 21'; Nana-Sinkam (yellow card) 34'; Adekoya (yellow card) 72'	Recap; Boxscore	Argueta (yellow card) 29'; Jones 45'	Stadium: Starfire Sports Complex; Attendance: 1,004; Referee: Benjamin Oakley

September 20, 2017 USL 29	Seattle Sounders FC 2	0–1	Phoenix Rising FC	Tukwila, Washington
19:30 (PDT)	Delem (yellow card) 42', (red card) 64'; Ulysse (yellow card) 84'	Recap; Boxscore	Vásquez (yellow card) 33' (yellow-red card) 60'; Riggi 44'; Johnson (yellow card) 75'	Stadium: Starfire Sports Complex; Attendance: 966; Referee: Katja Koroleva

October 7, 2017 USL 30	Tulsa Roughnecks FC	1–0	Seattle Sounders FC 2	Tulsa, Oklahoma
17:00 (PDT)	Fernandez (yellow card) 11' (yellow-red card) 45+3'; Thierjung 14'; Ugarte (yellow card) 29'	Preview	Wingo (yellow card) 19'; Chenkam (yellow card) 49'; Nana-Sinkam (yellow card) 73'; Alfaro (yellow card) 86'	Stadium: ONEOK Field; Attendance: 3,023; Referee: José Lara

October 11, 2017 USL 31	Swope Park Rangers	2–1	Seattle Sounders FC 2	Kansas City, Missouri
17:30 (PDT)	Moloto 48'; Selbol 54' (pen.); Storm (yellow card) 66'; Barnathan (yellow card) 80'	Preview	Mathers 28', (yellow card) 79'; Olsen (yellow card) 87'	Stadium: Swope Soccer Village; Attendance: 937; Referee: Tim Wagner

October 15, 2017 USL 32	OKC Energy FC	3–1	Seattle Sounders FC 2	Oklahoma City, Oklahoma
15:00 (PDT)	Wallace (yellow card) 18'; Wojcik 43'; González 49'; Angulo 56'	Preview	Narbón (yellow card) 39'; Hopeau 84'; Ele (yellow card) 88'	Stadium: Taft Stadium; Attendance: 4,851; Referee: Kevin Broadley

== Statistics ==
=== Appearances and goals ===
Numbers after plus-sign(+) denote appearances as a substitute.

No.	Pos	Nat	Player	Total		Regular season		Playoffs	
No.	Pos	Nat	Player	Apps	Goals	Apps	Goals	Apps	Goals
1	GK	(United States) USA	Tyler Miller	19	0	19	0	0	0
5	DF	(Cameroon) CMR	Nouhou Tolo	6	1	6	1	0	0
11	MF	(United States) USA	Aaron Kovar	2	0	2	0	0	0
12	FW	(United States) USA	Seyi Adekoya	12	1	5+7	1	0	0
15	DF	(Mexico) MEX	Tony Alfaro	2	0	2	0	0	0
16	MF	(Scotland) SCO	Calum Mallace	3	0	3	0	0	0
19	MF	(United States) USA	Harry Shipp	2	0	2	0	0	0
21	DF	(Martinique) MTQ	Jordy Delem	4	0	4	0	0	0
23	MF	(United States) USA	Henry Wingo	10	2	8+2	2	0	0
30	FW	(Antigua and Barbuda) ANT	Javorn Stevens	9	0	1+8	0	0	0
31	MF	(United States) USA	Lorenzo Ramos	21	0	13+8	0	0	0
32	MF	(United States) USA	Zach Mathers	21	10	20+1	10	0	0
34	DF	(United States) USA	Brian Nana-Sinkam	25	3	24+1	3	0	0
35	GK	(United States) USA	Bryan Meredith	8	0	8	0	0	0
36	DF	(Haiti) HAI	Denso Ulysse	14	0	13+1	0	0	0
37	FW	(United States) USA	Shandon Hopeau	15	0	11+4	0	0	0
40	MF	(United States) USA	Azriel Gonzalez	8	0	2+6	0	0	0
41	MF	(Australia) AUS	Jamie Dimitroff	5	0	0+5	0	0	0
42	MF	(United States) USA	Kei Tomozawa	1	0	0+1	0	0	0
43	MF	(United States) USA	Paul Rothrock	1	0	0+1	0	0	0
45	MF	(Colombia) COL	Camilo Santiago	2	0	1+1	0	0	0
47	MF	(United States) USA	Christian Koontz	7	0	7	0	0	0
48	MF	(United States) USA	Cameron Martin	1	0	1	0	0	0
49	FW	(United States) USA	Alfonso Ocampo-Chavez	1	0	1	0	0	0
51	FW	(United States) USA	Milo Barton	6	0	3+3	0	0	0
53	DF	(United States) USA	Sam Rogers	23	2	23	2	0	0
54	DF	(United States) USA	Joe Hafferty	1	0	0+1	0	0	0
57	MF	(United States) USA	Dylan Teves	2	0	1+1	0	0	0
58	DF	(United States) USA	Ethan Lotenero	1	0	1	0	0	0
59	DF	(United States) USA	Jackson Ragen	3	0	1+2	0	0	0
60	GK	(United States) USA	Trey Muse	0	0	0	0	0	0
64	GK	(United States) USA	Sam Fowler	2	0	2	0	0	0
68	DF	(United States) USA	Khai Brisco	5	0	5	0	0	0
70	MF	(Cameroon) CMR	Guy Serge Edoa	9	0	1+8	0	0	0
71	FW	(United States) USA	David Olsen	24	4	21+3	4	0	0
73	DF	(United States) USA	Riley Grant	12	1	10+2	1	0	0
77	MF	(Panama) PAN	Francisco Narbón	22	1	20+2	1	0	0
78	MF	(United States) USA	Charles Renken	15	1	10+5	1	0	0
80	FW	(United States) USA	Victor Mansaray	2	0	0+2	0	0	0
88	MF	(United States) USA	Ray Saari	24	2	23+1	2	0	0
92	DF	(Cameroon) CMR	Rodrigue Ele	14	0	14	0	0	0
96	DF	(Australia) AUS	Steve Whyte	5	0	5	0	0	0
99	FW	(Cameroon) CMR	Felix Chenkam	16	5	12+4	5	0	0
	GK	(United States) USA	Cody Lang	1	0	0+1	0	0	0
Players who left the club during the season:
38	MF	(United States) USA	Irvin Parra	20	6	18+2	6	0	0

- Last updated: September 20, 2017

=== Top scorers ===
Place	Position	Number	Name	Regular season	Playoffs	Total
1	MF	32	(United States) Zach Mathers	11	0	11
2	MF	38	(United States) Irvin Parra	6	0	6
3	FW	99	(Cameroon) Felix Chenkam	5	0	5
4	FW	71	(United States) David Olsen	4	0	4
5	DF	34	(United States) Brian Nana-Sinkam	3	0	3
6	MF	23	(United States) Henry Wingo	2	0	2
6	DF	53	(United States) Sam Rogers	2	0	2
6	MF	88	(United States) Ray Saari	2	0	2
9	DF	5	(Cameroon) Nouhou Tolo	1	0	1
9	FW	12	(United States) Seyi Adekoya	1	0	1
9	FW	37	(United States) Shandon Hopeau	1	0	1
9	DF	43	(United States) Paul Rothrock	1	0	1
9	MF	73	(United States) Riley Grant	1	0	1
9	DF	77	(Panama) Francisco Narbón	1	0	1
9	DF	78	(Zambia) Charles Renken	1	0	1
Total				42	0	42

- Source: USL

=== Disciplinary record ===
No.	Pos	Player	Regular Season			Playoffs			Total		
No.	Pos	Player	Yellow card	(yellow card) (yellow-red card)	Red card	Yellow card	(yellow card) (yellow-red card)	Red card	Yellow card	(yellow card) (yellow-red card)	Red card
12	FW	(United States) Seyi Adekoya	1	0	0	0	0	0	1	0	0
15	DF	(Mexico) Tony Alfaro	1	0	0	0	0	0	1	0	0
21	DF	(Martinique) Jordy Delem	2	0	1	0	0	0	2	0	1
31	DF	(United States) Lorenzo Ramos	2	0	0	0	0	0	2	0	0
32	MF	(United States) Zach Mathers	4	0	0	0	0	0	4	0	0
34	DF	(United States) Brian Nana-Sinkam	2	0	0	0	0	0	2	0	0
36	DF	(Haiti) Denso Ulysse	3	0	0	0	0	0	3	0	0
38	MF	(United States) Irvin Parra	7	0	0	0	0	0	7	0	0
40	MF	(United States) Azriel Gonzalez	0	0	1	0	0	0	0	0	1
41	MF	(Australia) Jamie Dimitroff	1	0	0	0	0	0	1	0	0
42	MF	(United States) Kei Tomozawa	1	0	0	0	0	0	1	0	0
45	MF	(Colombia) Camilo Santiago	1	0	0	0	0	0	1	0	0
47	DF	(United States) Christian Koontz	3	0	0	0	0	0	3	0	0
53	DF	(United States) Sam Rogers	1	0	0	0	0	0	1	0	0
59	DF	(United States) Jackson Ragen	1	0	0	0	0	0	1	0	0
70	MF	(Cameroon) Guy Serge Edoa	1	0	0	0	0	0	1	0	0
71	FW	(United States) David Olsen	1	0	0	0	0	0	1	0	0
73	DF	(United States) Riley Grant	2	0	0	0	0	0	2	0	0
77	MF	(Panama) Francisco Narbón	4	0	0	0	0	0	4	0	0
78	MF	(Zambia) Charles Renken	1	0	0	0	0	0	1	0	0
88	MF	(United States) Ray Saari	6	1	0	0	0	0	6	1	0
92	DF	(Cameroon) Rodrigue Ele	4	1	0	0	0	0	4	1	0
99	FW	(Cameroon) Felix Chenkam	3	0	0	0	0	0	3	0	0
Total			52	2	2	0	0	0	52	2	2

- Last updated: September 20, 2017

== Honors and awards ==
=== Player of the Week ===
Week	Position	Player	Ref
11	FW	(United States) Irvin Parra	

=== Save of the Week ===
Week	Result	Player	Ref
1	Nominated	(United States) Bryan Meredith	
8	Nominated	(United States) Tyler Miller	

=== Save of the Month ===
Month	Result	Player	Ref
May	Nominated	(United States) Tyler Miller	

=== Team of the Week ===
Week	Position	Player	Ref
4	DF	(Cameroon) Nouhou Tolo	
6	FW	(Cameroon) Felix Chenkam	
11	FW	(United States) Irvin Parra	
