= 2018 Seattle Sounders FC 2 season =

Seattle Sounders FC 2
2018 season
- General manager: TBA
- Head coach: John Hutchinson
- Stadium: Cheney Stadium
- USL: Conference: 16th place
- USL Playoffs: DNQ
- Top goalscorer: David Estrada
- Highest home attendance: League: 6,049 (March 16 vs. Portland Timbers 2)
- Lowest home attendance: League: 2,090 (April 11 vs. Real Monarchs SLC)
- Average home league attendance: League: 3,370
Home colors	Away colors

The 2018 Seattle Sounders FC 2 season was the club's fourth year of existence, and their fourth season in the United Soccer League, the second tier of the American soccer pyramid. It was also their first season since they relocated to Tacoma, Washington.

== Roster ==
Note: Flags indicate national team as defined under FIFA eligibility rules; some limited exceptions apply. Players may hold more than one non-FIFA nationality. Squad correct as of September 29, 2018.

No.	Pos.	Nation	Player
5	DF	CMR	Nouhou Tolo
15	DF	MEX	Tony Alfaro
16	MF	USA	Alex Roldan
19	MF	USA	Harry Shipp
21	MF	MTQ	Jordy Delem
23	MF	USA	Henry Wingo
25	GK	USA	Calle Brown
27	FW	USA	Lamar Neagle
30	DF	USA	Jordan McCrary
31	DF	USA	Nick Hinds
33	DF	USA	Sam Rogers
34	DF	NGA	Ibrahim Usman
35	GK	USA	Bryan Meredith
36	DF	HAI	Denso Ulysse
37	FW	USA	Shandon Hopeau
38	MF	USA	Azriel Gonzalez
40	MF	USA	Danny Leyva
41	DF	USA	Khai Brisco
42	MF	USA	Cameron Martin
43	MF	USA	Dylan Teves
44	MF	USA	Rudy Stretch
45	MF	USA	Blake Malone
46	MF	USA	Peter Kingston
48	FW	PUR	Alec Díaz
49	FW	USA	Danny Robles
50	MF	USA	Marlon Vargas
51	MF	USA	Gabe Threadgold
53	DF	USA	Enrique Montana
55	MF	USA	Leo Burney
56	MF	USA	Josh Atencio
57	MF	USA	Gio Miglietti
58	DF	USA	Sakari Carter
59	DF	USA	Jake Morris
60	GK	USA	Sam Fowler
62	FW	USA	Conrad Lee
68	GK	USA	Jacob Castro
70	MF	KEN	Handwalla Bwana
71	FW	USA	David Olsen
74	FW	MEX	David Estrada
77	MF	PAN	Francisco Narbón
80	MF	USA	Ray Serrano
87	FW	USA	Alfonso Ocampo-Chavez
89	MF	AUS	Jesse Daley
90	DF	CRC	Waylon Francis
92	DF	CMR	Rodrigue Ele
96	DF	USA	Jalen Markey
98	MF	ENG	Antonee Burke-Gilroy
99	FW	CMR	Felix Chenkam

Signed to first team contract with Sounders FC.
Sounders FC Academy player.

== Competitions ==
=== Preseason ===
February 24, 2018	Seattle Sounders FC 2	3–0	Gonzaga University	Tukwila, Washington
13:30 (PST)				Stadium: Starfire Sports Complex

March 3, 2018	Portland Timbers 2	2–0	Seattle Sounders FC 2	Portland, Oregon
(PST)

March 10, 2018	Seattle University	1–0	Seattle Sounders FC 2	Seattle, Washington
19:00 (PST)	Ruiz			Stadium: Seattle University Championship Field
Note: Match was called close to the end of the first half due to the lights at the stadium going out.

=== Friendlies ===
April 28, 2018	University of Washington	0–0	Seattle Sounders FC 2	Seattle, Washington
12:00 (PDT)				Stadium: Husky Soccer Stadium

=== USL regular season ===
==== Standings ====
Pos	Team	Pld	W	D	L	GF	GA	GD	Pts
13	Rio Grande Valley Toros	34	8	14	12	36	42	−6	38
14	LA Galaxy II	34	10	7	17	60	67	−7	37
15	Las Vegas Lights FC	34	8	7	19	50	74	−24	31
16	Seattle Sounders FC 2	34	6	7	21	40	71	−31	25
17	Tulsa Roughnecks	34	3	12	19	36	77	−41	21

Source: 2018 USL standings
Rules for classification: 1) total wins; 2) total goal differential; 3) total goals scored; 4) points earned against top four Conference finishers; 5) disciplinary points; 6) coin toss or drawing of lots

==== Results summary ====
Overall								Home						Away					
Pld	W	D	L	GF	GA	GD	Pts	W	D	L	GF	GA	GD	W	D	L	GF	GA	GD
34	6	7	21	40	71	−31	25	5	5	7	26	28	−2	1	2	14	14	43	−29

Last updated: October 13, 2018.
Source: USL

==== Results by matchday ====
Matchday	1	2	3	4	5	6	7	8	9	10	11	12	13	14	15	16	17	18	19	20	21	22	23	24	25	26	27	28	29	30	31	32	33	34
Stadium	H	A	H	A	H	H	A	H	H	A	A	H	A	A	H	H	A	A	H	A	H	A	A	H	H	H	A	H	A	A	H	A	H	A
Result	W	L	L	L	L	W	D	L	L	D	L	W	L	L	L	L	L	L	W	L	W	L	L	D	D	D	L	L	L	L	D	L	D	W

Source: USL
A = Away; H = Home; W = Win; D = Draw; L = Loss

==== Matches ====
Win Draw Loss Upcoming fixture

March 16, 2018 USL 1	Seattle Sounders FC 2	2–1	Portland Timbers 2	Tacoma, Washington
19:00 (PDT)	Alfaro (yellow card) 28'; Chenkam 43' (pen.); Hinds 45'; Ulysse (yellow card) 78'	Recap; Boxscore	Williams 30'	Stadium: Cheney Stadium; Attendance: 6,049; Referee: Victor Rivas

March 24, 2018 USL 2	Swope Park Rangers	4–2	Seattle Sounders FC 2	Overland Park, Kansas
17:30 (PDT)	Kuzain (yellow card) 17'; Belmar 21', 61'; Saravia 35'; Storm 52'; Benitez (yellow card) 64'	Recap; Boxscore	Estrada 19', 56'; Bwana (yellow card) 33'; Roldan (yellow card) 74'	Stadium: Shawnee Mission South District Stadium; Attendance: 1,134; Referee: Jon Freemon

March 28, 2018 USL 3	Seattle Sounders FC 2	0–1	Fresno FC	Tacoma, Washington
19:00 (PDT)	Saari (yellow card) 30'; Ulysse (yellow card) 90'+2'	Recap; Boxscore	Johnson 82'; Ellis-Hayden (yellow card) 85'	Stadium: Cheney Stadium; Attendance: 2,884; Referee: Daniel Radford

April 7, 2018 USL 4	Sacramento Republic FC	1–0	Seattle Sounders FC 2	Sacramento, California
19:30 (PDT)	Taintor (red card) 20'; Partain (yellow card) 70'; Moffat 71' (pen.)	Recap; Boxscore	Ele (yellow card) 32' (yellow-red card) 44'; Ulysse (red card) 63'; Narbón (yellow card) 70'	Stadium: Papa Murphy's Park; Attendance: 11,569; Referee: Michael Radchuk
Note: Ele's second yellow was rescinded by the USL Disciplinary Committee.

April 11, 2018 USL 5	Seattle Sounders FC 2	1–3	Real Monarchs SLC	Tacoma, Washington
19:00 (PDT)	Estrada 19'; Felix Chenkam (yellow card) 90'+2'	Recap; Boxscore	Kacher 4', 65'; Adams (yellow card) 49'; Hoffman 77'; Velasquez (yellow card) 88'	Stadium: Cheney Stadium; Attendance: 2,090; Referee: Alan Kelly

April 14, 2018 USL 6	Seattle Sounders FC 2	3–2	Rio Grande Valley FC	Tacoma, Washington
17:00 (PDT)	Chenkam 1', 66'; Rogers (yellow card) 50'; Gonzalez 82'	Recap; Boxscore	Luke (yellow card) 9'; Zaldívar 22'; Wharton (yellow card) 32'; Delgado 45'+1'	Stadium: Cheney Stadium; Attendance: 2,798; Referee: Levi Rippy

April 21, 2018 USL 7	Colorado Springs Switchbacks FC	0–0	Seattle Sounders FC 2	Colorado Springs, Colorado
17:00 (PDT)	Vercollone (yellow card) 49' (yellow-red card) 62'	Recap; Boxscore	Saari (yellow card) 16' (yellow-red card) 59'	Stadium: Weidner Field; Attendance: 2,534; Referee: Rosendo Mendoza

May 6, 2018 USL 8	Seattle Sounders FC 2	1–2	Sacramento Republic FC	Tacoma, Washington
13:30 (PDT)	Ulysse (yellow card) 31'; Chenkam 61'; Meredith 82' (o.g.)	Boxscore	Taintor 41'	Stadium: Cheney Stadium; Attendance: 2.652; Referee: Farhad Dadkho

May 12, 2018 USL 9	Seattle Sounders FC 2	0–1	Portland Timbers 2	Tacoma, Washington
17:00 (PDT)	Ele (yellow card) 11'; Narbón (yellow card) 62'	Boxscore	Williamson (yellow card) 49', (goal) 90'+2'; Jadama (yellow card) 56'	Stadium: Cheney Stadium; Attendance: 4,602; Referee: Elijio Arreguin

May 19, 2018 USL 10	Reno 1868 FC	1–1	Seattle Sounders FC 2	Reno, Nevada
19:00 (PDT)	Van Ewijk 60'	Boxscore	Carter (yellow card) 16'; Neagle (yellow card) 45'; Narbón (yellow card) 49'; Estrada 71'	Stadium: Greater Nevada Field; Attendance: 5,759; Referee: Lukasz Szpala

June 2, 2018 USL 11	Fresno FC	4–0	Seattle Sounders FC 2	Fresno, California
19:00 (PDT)	Caffa 27' (pen.); Kamdem (yellow card) 45'+3'; Chaney 52', (yellow card) 55'; Johnson 54', 84'	Boxscore	Hinds (yellow card) 12'; Daley (yellow card) 56'	Stadium: Chukchansi Park; Attendance: 5,382; Referee: Elton García

June 10, 2018 USL 12	Seattle Sounders FC 2	2–1	OKC Energy FC	Tacoma, Washington
13:30 (PDT)	Usman (yellow card) 45'; Estrada 83', 85'; Olsen (yellow card) 90'+3'	Boxscore	Beckie (yellow card) 7'; Dixon 76'; Alhassan (yellow card) 75'	Stadium: Cheney Stadium; Attendance: 3,305; Referee: Rosendo Mendoza

June 16, 2018 USL 13	Las Vegas Lights FC	4–1	Seattle Sounders FC 2	Las Vegas, Nevada
20:00 (PDT)	Ochoa 17', 35', (yellow card) 31'; Haiqui (yellow card) 19', (goal) 43'; Mathers 49'	Boxscore	Saari 45'+1', (yellow card) 85'	Stadium: Cashman Field; Attendance: 6,785; Referee: Alejandro Mariscal

July 1, 2018 USL 14	LA Galaxy II	5–3	Seattle Sounders FC 2	Carson, California
17:30 (PDT)	Acheampong 26'; López 28', (yellow card) 51'; Alvarez 49', 62'; Méndez 60'	Boxscore	Daley (yellow card) 3', (goal) 45'; Saari 14', (yellow card) 40'; Alfaro (yellow card) 34'; Ulysse (yellow card) 59'; Estrada 80'	Stadium: StubHub Center; Attendance: 1,714; Referee: Joseph Salinas

July 5, 2018 USL 15	Seattle Sounders FC 2	0–2	Swope Park Rangers	Tacoma, Washington
19:00 (PDT)	Saari (yellow card) 64'	Boxscore	Hernandez 10'; Silva (red card) 21'; Storm (yellow card) 33'; Lewis (yellow card) 53'; Barry 65'; Dick (yellow card) 90'+1'	Stadium: Cheney Stadium; Attendance: 2.367; Referee: Joseph Dickerson

July 8, 2018 USL 16	Seattle Sounders FC 2	1–2	Reno 1868 FC	Tacoma, Washington
13:30 (PDT)	Estrada 18', (yellow card) 46'; Ele (yellow card) 37'; Brisco (yellow card) 58'	Boxscore	Mfeka (yellow card) 23' (yellow-red card) 42'; Casiple 59' (pen.); Brown 70'; Marie (yellow card) 75'	Stadium: Cheney Stadium; Attendance: 2,778; Referee: Mike Hohnholz

July 14, 2018 USL 17	Real Monarchs SLC	2–0	Seattle Sounders FC 2	Herriman, Utah
19:00 (PDT)	Adams (yellow card) 17', (goal) 26'; Velasquez 70'; Kacher (yellow card) 73'; Chang (yellow card) 84'	Boxscore	Daley (yellow card) 54'; Burke-Gilroy (yellow card) 80'	Stadium: Zions Bank Stadium; Attendance: 835; Referee: Farhad Dadkho

July 20, 2018 USL 18	Phoenix Rising FC	1–0	Seattle Sounders FC 2	Scottsdale, Arizona
19:00 (PDT)	Cortez 56'; Musa (yellow card) 70'	Preview	Burke-Gilroy (yellow card) 48'; Ulysse (yellow card) 53'; Usman (yellow card) 83'; Hinds (yellow card) 86'	Stadium: Phoenix Rising Soccer Complex; Attendance: 7,381; Referee: Ismir Pekmic

July 26, 2018 USL 19	Seattle Sounders FC 2	3–0	Las Vegas Lights FC	Tacoma, Washington
19:00 (PDT)	Burke-Gilroy 2'; Ele (yellow card) 57'; Miglietti (yellow card) 62'; Estrada 68' (pen.); Neagle 72'	Preview	Alatorre (yellow card) 19' (yellow-red card) 45'; Huiqui (yellow card) 21'; Alvarez (red card) 45+2'	Stadium: Cheney Stadium; Attendance: 3,259; Referee: Mark Allatin

August 4, 2018 USL 20	Saint Louis FC	2-0	Seattle Sounders FC 2	Fenton, Missouri
17:30 (PDT)	Greig 3'; Ledbetter 34'; Da Silva (yellow card) 42'	Preview	Ele (yellow card) 21'; Daley (yellow card) 51'; Neagle (yellow card) 70'; Alfaro (yellow card) 90+2'	Stadium: Toyota Stadium; Attendance: 4,134; Referee: Lorant Varga

August 11, 2018 USL 21	Seattle Sounders FC 2	3–2	San Antonio FC	Tacoma, Washington
19:00 (PDT)	Wingo 5', 45+3'; Hopeau 68'; Hinds (yellow card) 72'; Olsen (yellow card) 75' (yellow-red card) 77'	Boxscore	Daley 13' (o.g.); Guzmán 24'; Lopez (yellow card) 31'; King (yellow card) 45+2'; Ward (yellow card) 73'; Rodriguez (yellow card) 79'; Hedrick (yellow card) 83'	Stadium: Cheney Stadium; Attendance: 4,761; Referee: Jon Freemon

August 19, 2018 USL 22	Portland Timbers 2	4–1	Seattle Sounders FC 2	Portland, Oregon
19:00 (PDT)	Barmby (yellow card) 1'; Langsdorf 34', 68'; Zambrano 61'; Diz 78'	Preview	Brisco (yellow card) 54'; Atencio 76'; Ele (yellow card) 87'	Stadium: Providence Park; Attendance: 1,145; Referee: Bardhyl Pashaj

August 25, 2018 USL 23	OKC Energy FC	3–0	Seattle Sounders FC 2	Oklahoma City, Oklahoma
17:30 (PDT)	Volesky 28'; Jahn 56'; Bustos 78', (yellow card) 79'	Preview	Ele (yellow card) 2'; Alfaro (yellow card) 52'; Daley (yellow card) 55'; Olsen (yellow card) 62'	Stadium: Taft Stadium; Attendance: 4,732; Referee: Luis Guardia

August 29, 2018 USL 24	Seattle Sounders FC 2	1–1	Saint Louis FC	Tacoma, Washington
19:00 (PDT)	Wingo (yellow card) 35'; Burke-Gilroy 37'	Preview	Greig 27'; Fall (yellow card) 86'	Stadium: Cheney Stadium; Attendance: 3,051; Referee: Daniel Radford

September 2, 2018 USL 25	Seattle Sounders FC 2	1–1	Orange County SC	Tacoma, Washington
13:30 (PDT)	Daley 12', (yellow card) 63'; Usman (yellow card) 52'; Burke-Gilroy (yellow card) 59'; Roldan (yellow card) 63'	Report	Crognale 57'; Alston (yellow card) 70'	Stadium: Cheney Stadium; Attendance: 2,526; Referee: Alejandro Mariscal

September 5, 2018 USL 26	Seattle Sounders FC 2	4–4	Tulsa Roughnecks FC	Tacoma, Washington
19:00 (PDT)	Neagle 45+1' (pen.); Wingo 59'; Estrada 82'; Ulysse (yellow card) 87'; Hopeau 90+4'	Report	Ferreira 16', 54', 56', (yellow card) 90'; Rivas 39' (pen.), (yellow card) 77'; Cerda (yellow card) 85'	Stadium: Cheney Stadium; Attendance: 2,465; Referee: Mark Allatin

September 8, 2018 USL 27	Sacramento Republic FC	3–0	Seattle Sounders FC 2	Sacramento, California
19:30 (PDT)	Iwasa 20'; Eissele 58', 64' (pen.); Klimenta (yellow card) 76'	Report	Alfaro (yellow card) 30' (yellow-red card) 63'; Olsen (yellow card) 90+2'	Stadium: Papa Murphy's Park; Attendance: 11,569; Referee: Thomas Snyder

September 15, 2018 USL 28	Seattle Sounders FC 2	0–1	Phoenix Rising FC	Tacoma, Washington
19:00 (PDT)	Ulysse (yellow card) 38'; Markey (yellow card) 62'; Hopeau (yellow card) 69'	Preview	Cortez 16'; Awako (yellow card) 89'	Stadium: Cheney Stadium; Attendance: 5,392; Referee: Greg Dopka

September 22, 2018 USL 29	Rio Grande Valley FC	3–0	Seattle Sounders FC 2	Edinburg, Texas
17:30 (PDT)	Wharton 5'; Bird 41'; Perea 76'	Preview	Gonzalez (yellow card) 32'	Stadium: H-E-B Park; Attendance: 4,468; Referee: Elijio Arreguin

September 29, 2018 USL 30	San Antonio FC	3–1	Seattle Sounders FC 2	San Antonio, Texas
17:30 (PDT)	Laing 19'; Bryant 26', (yellow card) 62'; Castillo (yellow card) 78'; Pecka (yellow card) 85'; Lopez (yellow card) 86'; Rodriguez 90'+2'	Report	Gonzalez 45'; Daley (yellow card) 43'; Ele (red card) 72'	Stadium: Toyota Field; Attendance: 7,614; Referee: Lorant Varga

October 3, 2018 USL 31	Seattle Sounders FC 2	2–2	LA Galaxy II	Tacoma, Washington
19:00 (PDT)	Roldan 31'; Neagle 34'; Alfaro (yellow card) 73'	Report	Acheampong (yellow card) 26'; Appiah 39'; F. López 80'; Engola (yellow card) 84'; Araujo (yellow card) 90'+3'	Stadium: Cheney Stadium; Attendance: 3,087; Referee: Sergii Demianchuk

October 6, 2018 USL 32	Orange County SC	2–1	Seattle Sounders FC 2	Irvine, California
19:00 (PDT)	Chaplow 62'; Quinn 90'+4' (pen.)	Report	Burke-Gilroy (yellow card) 13'; Daley (yellow card) 22'; Gonzalez 60'; Malone (yellow card) 85'; Vargas (yellow card) 90'+3'	Stadium: Champions Soccer Stadium at OC Great Park; Attendance: 4,206; Referee: Omeed Azadpour

October 10, 2018 USL 33	Seattle Sounders FC 2	2–2	Colorado Springs Switchbacks FC	Tacoma, Washington
19:00 (PDT)	Neagle 45', (yellow card) 76'; Díaz 81'	Report	Hunter (yellow card) 33'; Robinson 51'; Malcolm 52'; Ajeakwa (yellow card) 61'	Stadium: Cheney Stadium; Attendance: 3,219; Referee: Michael Radchuk

October 13, 2018 USL 34	Tulsa Roughnecks FC	1–4	Seattle Sounders FC 2	Tulsa, Oklahoma
17:00 (PDT)	Tavares 42'; Gamble (yellow card) 48'; Muñoz (yellow card) 53'	Boxscore	Markey (yellow card) 8'; Díaz 21'; Estrada 46'; Burke-Gilroy 63'; Olsen 87'	Stadium: ONEOK Field; Attendance: 3,018; Referee: José Lara

== Statistics ==
=== Appearances and goals ===
Numbers after plus-sign(+) denote appearances as a substitute.

No.	Pos	Nat	Player	Total		Regular season		Playoffs	
No.	Pos	Nat	Player	Apps	Goals	Apps	Goals	Apps	Goals
5	DF	(Cameroon) CMR	Nouhou Tolo	1	0	1	0	0	0
15	DF	(Mexico) MEX	Tony Alfaro	14	0	14	0	0	0
16	MF	(United States) USA	Alex Roldan	8	1	6+2	1	0	0
19	MF	(United States) USA	Harry Shipp	1	0	1	0	0	0
21	MF	(Martinique) MTQ	Jordy Delem	4	0	4	0	0	0
23	MF	(United States) USA	Henry Wingo	12	2	12	2	0	0
25	GK	(United States) USA	Calle Brown	21	0	21	0	0	0
27	FW	(United States) USA	Lamar Neagle	8	4	8	4	0	0
30	DF	(United States) USA	Jordan McCrary	4	0	4	0	0	0
31	DF	(United States) USA	Nick Hinds	26	1	18+8	1	0	0
33	DF	(United States) USA	Sam Rogers	11	0	11	0	0	0
34	DF	(Nigeria) NGA	Ibrahim Usman	26	0	20+6	0	0	0
35	GK	(United States) USA	Bryan Meredith	9	0	9	0	0	0
36	DF	(Haiti) HAI	Denso Ulysse	28	0	28	0	0	0
37	FW	(United States) USA	Shandon Hopeau	28	2	22+6	2	0	0
38	MF	(United States) USA	Azriel Gonzalez	18	3	10+8	3	0	0
40	MF	(United States) USA	Danny Leyva	1	0	1	0	0	0
41	DF	(United States) USA	Khai Brisco	14	0	10+4	0	0	0
42	MF	(United States) USA	Cameron Martin	7	0	3+4	0	0	0
43	MF	(United States) USA	Dylan Teves	10	0	7+3	0	0	0
44	MF	(United States) USA	Rudy Stretch	2	0	1+1	0	0	0
45	DF	(United States) USA	Blake Malone	6	0	6	0	0	0
46	MF	(United States) USA	Peter Kingston	2	0	2	0	0	0
48	FW	(Puerto Rico) PUR	Alec Díaz	5	2	3+2	2	0	0
49	FW	(United States) USA	Danny Robles	1	0	0+1	0	0	0
50	MF	(United States) USA	Marlon Vargas	9	0	7+2	0	0	0
51	MF	(United States) USA	Gabe Threadgold	4	0	3+1	0	0	0
53	DF	(United States) USA	Enrique Montana	1	0	0+1	0	0	0
55	MF	(United States) USA	Leo Burney	3	0	3	0	0	0
56	MF	(United States) USA	Josh Atencio	2	1	1+1	1	0	0
57	MF	(United States) USA	Gio Miglietti	7	0	4+3	0	0	0
58	DF	(United States) USA	Sakari Carter	1	0	1	0	0	0
59	MF	(United States) USA	Jake Morris	3	0	1+2	0	0	0
60	GK	(United States) USA	Sam Fowler	2	0	2	0	0	0
62	FW	(United States) USA	Conrad Lee	0	0	0	0	0	0
68	GK	(United States) USA	Jacob Castro	2	0	2	0	0	0
70	MF	(Kenya) KEN	Handwalla Bwana	4	0	4	0	0	0
71	FW	(United States) USA	David Olsen	21	1	15+6	1	0	0
74	FW	(United States) USA	David Estrada	33	11	16+17	11	0	0
77	MF	(Panama) PAN	Francisco Narbón	11	0	10+1	0	0	0
80	MF	(United States) USA	Ray Serrano	3	0	1+2	0	0	0
87	FW	(United States) USA	Alfonso Ocampo-Chavez	3	0	2+1	0	0	0
89	MF	(Australia) AUS	Jesse Daley	22	2	19+3	2	0	0
90	DF	(Costa Rica) CRC	Waylon Francis	1	0	1	0	0	0
92	DF	(Cameroon) CMR	Rodrigue Ele	23	0	22+1	0	0	0
96	DF	(United States) USA	Jalen Markey	6	0	3+3	0	0	0
98	MF	(England) ENG	Antonee Burke-Gilroy	19	3	14+5	3	0	0
99	FW	(Cameroon) CMR	Felix Chenkam	11	4	8+3	4	0	0
Players who left the club during the season:
88	MF	(United States) USA	Ray Saari	12	2	11+1	2	0	0

- Last updated: October 13, 2018

=== Top scorers ===
Rank	Position	Number	Name	Regular season	Playoffs	Total
1	FW	74	(United States) David Estrada	11	0	11
2	FW	27	(United States) Lamar Neagle	4	0	4
2	FW	99	(Cameroon) Felix Chenkam	4	0	4
4	MF	23	(United States) Henry Wingo	3	0	3
4	FW	38	(United States) Azriel Gonzalez	3	0	3
4	MF	98	(England) Antonee Burke-Gilroy	3	0	3
7	FW	37	(United States) Shandon Hopeau	2	0	2
7	FW	48	(Puerto Rico) Alec Díaz	2	0	2
7	MF	88	(United States) Ray Saari	2	0	2
7	MF	89	(Australia) Jesse Daley	2	0	2
11	MF	16	(United States) Alex Roldan	1	0	1
11	MF	31	(United States) Nick Hinds	1	0	1
11	MF	56	(United States) Josh Atencio	1	0	1
11	FW	71	(United States) David Olsen	1	0	1
Total				40	0	40

- Last updated: October 13, 2018
- Source: USL

=== Disciplinary record ===
No.	Pos	Player	Regular Season			Playoffs			Total		
No.	Pos	Player	Booked	(yellow card) (yellow-red card)	Sent off (straight red)	Booked	(yellow card) (yellow-red card)	Sent off (straight red)	Booked	(yellow card) (yellow-red card)	Sent off (straight red)
15	DF	(Mexico) Tony Alfaro	5	1	0	0	0	0	5	1	0
16	MF	(United States) Alex Roldan	2	0	0	0	0	0	2	0	0
23	MF	(United States) Henry Wingo	1	0	0	0	0	0	1	0	0
27	FW	(United States) Lamar Neagle	3	0	0	0	0	0	3	0	0
31	DF	(United States) Nick Hinds	3	0	0	0	0	0	3	0	0
33	DF	(United States) Sam Rogers	1	0	0	0	0	0	1	0	0
34	DF	(Nigeria) Ibrahim Usman	4	0	0	0	0	0	4	0	0
36	DF	(Haiti) Denso Ulysse	7	0	1	0	0	0	7	0	1
37	MF	(United States) Shandon Hopeau	1	0	0	0	0	0	1	0	0
38	MF	(United States) Azriel Gonzalez	1	0	0	0	0	0	1	0	0
41	DF	(United States) Khai Brisco	2	0	0	0	0	0	2	0	0
45	MF	(United States) Blake Malone	1	0	0	0	0	0	1	0	0
50	MF	(United States) Marlon Vargas	1	0	0	0	0	0	1	0	0
57	MF	(United States) Gio Miglietti	1	0	0	0	0	0	1	0	0
58	DF	(United States) Sakari Carter	1	0	0	0	0	0	1	0	0
70	MF	(Kenya) Handwalla Bwana	1	0	0	0	0	0	1	0	0
71	FW	(United States) David Olsen	3	1	0	0	0	0	3	1	0
74	FW	(United States) David Estrada	1	0	0	0	0	0	1	0	0
77	MF	(Panama) Francisco Narbón	3	0	0	0	0	0	3	0	0
88	MF	(United States) Ray Saari	4	1	0	0	0	0	4	1	0
89	MF	(Australia) Jesse Daley	8	0	0	0	0	0	8	0	0
92	DF	(Cameroon) Rodrigue Ele	7	0	1	0	0	0	7	0	1
96	DF	(United States) Jalen Markey	2	0	0	0	0	0	2	0	0
98	MF	(England) Antonee Burke-Gilroy	4	0	0	0	0	0	4	0	0
99	FW	(Cameroon) Felix Chenkam	1	0	0	0	0	0	1	0	0
Total			68	3	2	0	0	0	68	3	2

- Last updated: October 13, 2018

== Honors and awards ==
=== Team of the Week ===
Week	Position	Player	Ref
1	MF	(United States) Nick Hinds	
5	FW	(United States) Felix Chenkam	
13	FW	(Mexico) David Estrada	
13	Bench	(United States) Sakari Carter	
20	Bench	(England) Antonee Burke-Gilroy	
22	MF	(United States) Henry Wingo	

=== USL 20 under 20 ===
Rank	Position	Player	Age	Ref
7	DF	(Haiti) Denso Ulysse	19	
15	DF	(United States) Sam Rogers	19	
19	DF	(Cameroon) Rodrigue Ele	20	

== Transfers ==
For transfers in, dates listed are when Sounders FC 2 officially signed the players to the roster. Transactions where only the rights to the players are acquired are not listed. For transfers out, dates listed are when Sounders FC 2 officially removed the players from its roster, not when they signed with another club. If a player later signed with another club, his new club will be noted, but the date listed here remains the one when he was officially removed from Sounders FC 2 roster.

=== In ===
No.	Pos.	Player	Transferred from	Fee/notes	Date	Source
31	DF	(United States) Nick Hinds	(United States) University of Akron		January 22, 2018	
34	DF	(Nigeria) Ibrahim Usman	(Nigeria) Eco FC		February 14, 2018	
80	MF	(United States) Ray Serrano	(United States) Sounders Academy via Barca Academy AZ		February 14, 2018	
74	FW	(Mexico) David Estrada	(United States) Charlotte Independence	Free (also a Sounders Academy coach)	March 14, 2018	
87	FW	(United States) Alfonso Ocampo-Chavez	(United States) via Sounders Academy		April 10, 2018	
89	MF	(Australia) Jesse Daley	(Australia) Queensland Lions FC		May 1, 2018	
98	MF	(England) Antonee Burke-Gilroy	(Australia) Newcastle Jets		May 1, 2018	
50	FW	(United States) Marlon Vargas	(United States) Sounders Academy Central via California Aztecs		May 14, 2018	

=== Out ===
No.	Pos.	Player	Transferred to	Fee/notes	Date	Source
99	FW	(Cameroon) Felix Chenkam	(United States) Seattle Sounders FC	Free	May 25, 2018	
88	MF	(United States) Ray Saari	(United States) Sacramento Republic FC	Released	September 13, 2018	
