= 2018 Seattle Sounders FC season =

American soccer team season

Seattle Sounders FC
2018 season
- General manager: Garth Lagerwey
- Head coach: Brian Schmetzer
- Stadium: CenturyLink Field
- Major League Soccer: Conference: 2nd Overall: 4th
- MLS Cup playoffs: Western semifinals
- U.S. Open Cup: Fourth round
- CONCACAF Champions League: Quarterfinals
- Top goalscorer: League: Raúl Ruidíaz (10); All: Raúl Ruidíaz (13)
- Highest home attendance: League: 47,521 (June 30 vs. Portland Timbers)
- Lowest home attendance: League: 39,465 (June 9 vs. D.C. United)
- Average home league attendance: League: 40,641
- Biggest win: League: 5–0 vs. LA Galaxy (Aug. 18)
- Biggest defeat: League: 0–3 at Dallas (Mar. 18)
Home colors	Away colors

The 2018 Seattle Sounders FC season was the club's tenth season in Major League Soccer, the United States' top-tier of professional soccer. The Sounders finished their previous season as MLS Cup runners-up, losing 2–0 to Toronto FC. The 2018 season was Brian Schmetzer's second full MLS season as head coach of the Sounders.

== Background ==
=== Roster ===
Note: Flags indicate national team as defined under FIFA eligibility rules; some limited exceptions apply. Players may hold more than one non-FIFA nationality. Squad correct as of June 30, 2018.

No.	Pos.	Nation	Player
4	MF	SWE	Gustav Svensson
5	DF	CMR	Nouhou Tolo
6	MF	CUB	Osvaldo Alonso
7	MF	USA	Cristian Roldan
8	MF	ESP	Víctor Rodríguez
9	FW	PER	Raúl Ruidíaz (DP)
10	MF	URU	Nicolás Lodeiro (DP)
11	DF	AUS	Brad Smith (On loan from A.F.C. Bournemouth)
13	FW	USA	Jordan Morris (HGP)
14	DF	USA	Chad Marshall
15	DF	MEX	Tony Alfaro
16	MF	USA	Alex Roldan
17	FW	USA	Will Bruin
18	DF	NED	Kelvin Leerdam
19	MF	USA	Harry Shipp (HGP)
20	DF	KOR	Kim Kee-hee
21	MF	MTQ	Jordy Delem
23	MF	USA	Henry Wingo (HGP)
24	GK	SUI	Stefan Frei
25	GK	USA	Calle Brown
27	FW	USA	Lamar Neagle
29	DF	PAN	Román Torres
30	DF	USA	Jordan McCrary
35	GK	USA	Bryan Meredith
70	MF	KEN	Handwalla Bwana (HGP)
90	DF	CRC	Waylon Francis

=== Out on loan ===
Note: Flags indicate national team as defined under FIFA eligibility rules; some limited exceptions apply. Players may hold more than one non-FIFA nationality. Squad correct as of July 15, 2018.

No.	Pos.	Nation	Player
11	MF	USA	Aaron Kovar (HGP; on loan to Los Angeles FC)
99	FW	CMR	Felix Chenkam (on season long loan to Seattle Sounders FC 2)

== Competitions ==
Win Draw Loss Upcoming fixture

=== Preseason ===
==== Friendlies ====
January 28, 2018	Seattle Sounders FC	3–1	Club Tijuana U-20's	Chula Vista, California
10:00 (PST)	Bwana 2'; Dempsey 42'; Rodríguez 49'	Recap	85'	Stadium: Chula Vista Elite Athlete Training Center

February 3, 2018	Portland Timbers	1–2	Seattle Sounders FC	Tucson, Arizona
17:00 PST	Adi (yellow card) 20'; Guzmán (yellow card) 22'; Valeri 25'	Recap	Roldan 9'; Delem (yellow card) 32'; Bwana 68'; Mathers (yellow card) 73'	Stadium: Kino Sports Complex; Referee: Baldomero Toledo
Note: View Match

February 4, 2018	Columbus Crew SC	2–1	Seattle Sounders FC	Tucson, Arizona
11:00 PST	Biros 5'; Jahn 78'	Recap	Rodríguez 28'; Saari (yellow card) 81'	Stadium: University of Arizona Mulcahy Soccer Stadium

February 7, 2018	California United FC II	0–6	Seattle Sounders FC	Tucson, Arizona
15:00 PST		Report	Marshall 15', 34'; Lodeiro 31' (pen.); Roldan 36'; Morris 59', 62'
Note: 45-minute first half, 30-minute second half

February 8, 2018	California United FC II	1–5	Seattle Sounders FC	Tucson, Arizona
9:00 PST	56'	Report	Eikrem 16', 50'; Bruin 36', 37'; Nouhou 51'
Note: 45-minute first half, 30-minute second half

February 15, 2018	Reno 1868 FC	1–0	Seattle Sounders FC	Davis, California
13:30 PST	Calvillo 34'			Stadium: Aggie Soccer Field

February 15, 2018	Sacramento Republic FC	1–3	Seattle Sounders FC	Sacramento, California
19:30 PST	Eissele 47'		Morris 2', 78'; Wingo 28'	Stadium: Papa Murphy's Park; Attendance: 9,094
Note: View Match

=== Major League Soccer ===
==== League tables ====
===== Western Conference =====
Pos	Team	Pld	W	L	T	GF	GA	GD	Pts	Qualification
1	Sporting Kansas City	34	18	8	8	65	40	+25	62	MLS Cup Conference Semifinals
2	Seattle Sounders FC	34	18	11	5	52	37	+15	59	MLS Cup Conference Semifinals
3	Los Angeles FC	34	16	9	9	68	52	+16	57	MLS Cup Knockout Round
4	FC Dallas	34	16	9	9	52	44	+8	57	MLS Cup Knockout Round
5	Portland Timbers	34	15	10	9	54	48	+6	54	MLS Cup Knockout Round

Source: MLS

===== Overall =====
Pos	Team	Pld	W	L	T	GF	GA	GD	Pts	Qualification
2	Atlanta United FC (C)	34	21	7	6	70	44	+26	69	CONCACAF Champions League
3	Sporting Kansas City	34	18	8	8	65	40	+25	62	CONCACAF Champions League
4	Seattle Sounders FC	34	18	11	5	52	37	+15	59	
5	Los Angeles FC	34	16	9	9	68	52	+16	57	
6	FC Dallas	34	16	9	9	52	44	+8	57	

Source: MLS
Rules for classification: 1) points; 2) total wins; 3) total goal differential; 4) total goals scored; 5) disciplinary points; 6) away goals scored; 7) away goal differential; 8) coin toss or drawing of lots
(C) MLS Cup Champion

==== Results ====
Overall								Home						Away					
Pld	W	D	L	GF	GA	GD	Pts	W	D	L	GF	GA	GD	W	D	L	GF	GA	GD
34	18	5	11	52	37	+15	59	10	2	5	33	15	+18	8	3	6	19	22	−3

Last updated: September 29, 2018.
Source: MLS

Matchday	1	2	3	4	5	6	7	8	9	10	11	12	13	14	15	16	17	18	19	20	21	22	23	24	25	26	27	28	29	30	31	32	33	34
Stadium	H	A	H	A	H	A	H	A	A	H	A	H	A	H	H	A	A	A	H	A	H	A	H	H	A	H	A	H	A	H	H	A	A	H
Result	L	L	L	D	W	L	D	W	L	L	L	W	L	D	L	W	D	D	W	W	W	W	W	W	W	W	W	L	L	W	W	W	W	W

Source: MLS
A = Away; H = Home; W = Win; D = Draw; L = Loss

March 4, 2018 MLS 1	Seattle Sounders FC	0–1	Los Angeles FC	Seattle, Washington
14:00 (PST)	Alfaro (yellow card) 79' (yellow-red card) 83'; Nouhou (yellow card) 90'+4'	Recap; Boxscore	Rossi 11'; Feilhaber (yellow card) 69'	Stadium: CenturyLink Field; Attendance: 40,070; Referee: Jose Carlos Rivero

March 18, 2018 MLS 2	FC Dallas	3–0	Seattle Sounders FC	Frisco, Texas
14:00 (PDT)	Lamah 20', 63'; Urruti 58'; Nedyalkov (yellow card) 65'	Recap; Boxscore	Dempsey (red card) 37'; Svensson (yellow card) 45'+2'; Leerdam (yellow card) 65'; Kim (yellow card) 76'; Neagle (yellow card) 89'	Stadium: Toyota Stadium; Attendance: 13,310; Referee: Chris Penso

March 31, 2018 MLS 3	Seattle Sounders FC	0–1	Montreal Impact	Seattle, Washington
19:00 (PDT)	Leerdam (red card) 40'; Torres (yellow card) 71'	Recap; Boxscore	Lovitz (yellow card) 41'; Krolicki (yellow card) 47'; Vargas 60'; Piette (yellow card) 83'	Stadium: CenturyLink Field; Attendance: 39,469; Referee: Ismail Elfath

April 15, 2018 MLS 4	Sporting Kansas City	2–2	Seattle Sounders FC	Kansas City, Kansas
13:00 (PDT)	Sánchez 34' (pen.); Espinoza (yellow card) 53'; Zusi 78'; Medranda (yellow card) 90'+7'	Recap; Boxscore	McCrary (yellow card) 24'; C. Roldan (yellow card) 44', (goal) 73'; Bruin 45'+3'; Alonso (yellow card) 85'	Stadium: Children's Mercy Park; Attendance: 18,508; Referee: Drew Fischer

April 22, 2018 MLS 5	Seattle Sounders FC	3–1	Minnesota United FC	Seattle, Washington
13:00 (PDT)	Svensson 23'; Bruin 25'; Nouhou (yellow card) 58'; Leerdam (yellow card) 87'; Delem 90'+5'	Recap; Boxscore	Ramirez 66'	Stadium: CenturyLink Field; Attendance: 39,477; Referee: Armando Villarreal

April 29, 2018 MLS 6	Los Angeles FC	1–0	Seattle Sounders FC	Los Angeles, California
18:00 (PDT)	Kaye (yellow card) 63'; Ciman 90'+3'	Recap; Boxscore	Alonso (yellow card) 15'; C. Roldan (yellow card) 82'	Stadium: Banc of California Stadium; Attendance: 22,000; Referee: Kevin Stott

May 5, 2018 MLS 7	Seattle Sounders FC	0–0	Columbus Crew SC	Seattle, Washington
13:00 (PDT)	Alonso (yellow card) 30'	Recap; Boxscore	Santos (red card) 15'; Trapp (yellow card) 54'	Stadium: CenturyLink Field; Attendance: 39,515; Referee: Hilario Grajeda

May 9, 2018 MLS 8	Toronto FC	1–2	Seattle Sounders FC	Toronto, Ontario
16:30 (PDT)	Osorio 40'; Bradley (yellow card) 81'; Giovinco (yellow card) 90'	Recap; Boxscore	Bruin 25', (yellow card) 55'; Alfaro (yellow card) 44'; Bwana 54'; Delem (yellow card) 88'	Stadium: BMO Field; Attendance: 26,089; Referee: Ted Unkel

May 13, 2018 MLS 9	Portland Timbers	1–0	Seattle Sounders FC	Portland, Oregon
13:00 (PDT)	Ridgewell (yellow card) 44'; Blanco 86', (yellow card) 90'+6'	Recap; Boxscore	Delem (yellow card) 34'; A. Roldan (yellow card) 76'; Wingo (yellow card) 82'	Stadium: Providence Park; Attendance: 21,144; Referee: Robert Sibiga

May 26, 2018 MLS 10	Seattle Sounders FC	0–1	Real Salt Lake	Seattle, Washington
14:00 (PDT)	Eikrem (yellow card) 18'; Nouhou (yellow card) 37'	Recap; Boxscore	Sunny (yellow card) 24'; Glad (yellow card) 42'; Beckerman (yellow card) 45'; Saucedo 61'	Stadium: CenturyLink Field; Attendance: 39,508; Referee: Baldomero Toledo

June 2, 2018 MLS 11	Real Salt Lake	2–0	Seattle Sounders FC	Sandy, Utah
18:30 (PDT)	Leerdam (yellow card) 10'; Delem (yellow card) 25'	Recap; Boxscore	Baird 57'; Glad (yellow card) 87'; Silva 90'+1'	Stadium: Rio Tinto Stadium; Attendance: 18,556; Referee: Kevin Stott

June 9, 2018 MLS 12	Seattle Sounders FC	2–1	D.C. United	Seattle, Washington
19:00 (PDT)	Lodeiro 57'; Alonso (yellow card) 70'; Wolff 83'	Recap; Boxscore	Mattocks 53'	Stadium: CenturyLink Field; Attendance: 39,465; Referee: Sorin Stoica

June 13, 2018 MLS 13	New York Red Bulls	2–1	Seattle Sounders FC	Harrison, New Jersey
17:00 (PDT)	Royer 37'; Wright-Phillips 52'	Recap; Boxscore	McCrary (yellow card) 74'; Shipp (yellow card) 76', (goal) 87'; C. Roldan (yellow card) 90'+1'	Stadium: Red Bull Arena; Attendance: 15,553; Referee: Allen Chapman

June 23, 2018 MLS 14	Seattle Sounders FC	1–1	Chicago Fire	Seattle, Washington
19:00 (PDT)	Dempsey 22'; C. Roldan (yellow card) 87'; Nouhou (yellow card) 90'+1'	Recap; Boxscore	Katai 9'; Schweinsteiger (yellow card) 44'; Campbell (yellow card) 61'; Collier (yellow card) 85'	Stadium: CenturyLink Field; Attendance: 39,513; Referee: Armando Villarreal

June 30, 2018 MLS 15 Cascadia Cup	Seattle Sounders FC	2–3	Portland Timbers	Seattle, Washington
13:30 (PDT)	Rodríguez 51'; Marshall 68'; Nouhou (yellow card) 85'; Dempsey (yellow card) 89'; Kim (yellow card) 90'	Recap; Boxscore	Mabiala 48', 74'; Armenteros 57'; Valentin (yellow card) 87'	Stadium: CenturyLink Field; Attendance: 47,521; Referee: Ismail Elfath

July 4, 2018 MLS 16	Colorado Rapids	1–2	Seattle Sounders FC	Commerce City, Colorado
18:00 (PDT)	Nicholson 40', (yellow card) 65'; Boli (yellow card) 43'; Castillo (yellow card) 48'; Badji (yellow card) 66'; Azira (yellow card) 70'; Mason (yellow card) 87'	Recap; Boxscore	Bruin 19', 59'; Wolff (yellow card) 90'+5'	Stadium: Dick's Sporting Goods Park; Attendance: 16,374; Referee: Fotis Bazakos

July 7, 2018 MLS 17	New England Revolution	0–0	Seattle Sounders FC	Foxborough, Massachusetts
16:30 (PDT)	Fagundez (yellow card) 41'; Rowe (yellow card) 81'	Recap; Boxscore	Lodeiro (yellow card) 42'; Delem (yellow card) 90'+3'; Nouhou (yellow card) 90'+4'	Stadium: Gillette Stadium; Attendance: 16,484; Referee: Nima Saghafi

July 15, 2018 MLS 18	Atlanta United FC	1–1	Seattle Sounders FC	Atlanta, Georgia
11:00 (PDT)	González Pírez (yellow card) 15'; Escobar (yellow card) 45'; Martínez 48'; Parkhurst (yellow card) 56'	Recap; Boxscore	McCrary (yellow card) 26' (yellow-red card) 63'; Lodeiro 45' (pen.), (yellow card) 90'+4'	Stadium: Mercedes-Benz Stadium; Attendance: 72,243; Referee: Baldomero Toledo

July 21, 2018 MLS 19 Cascadia Cup	Seattle Sounders FC	2–0	Vancouver Whitecaps FC	Seattle, Washington
13:00 (PDT)	Lodeiro 5' (pen.), 31'; Nouhou (yellow card) 17'	Recap; Boxscore	Henry (yellow card) 16'; Waston (yellow card) 63'; Kamara (yellow card) 74'; Juárez (yellow card) 77' (red card) 77'	Stadium: CenturyLink Field; Attendance: 41,849; Referee: Chris Penso

July 25, 2018 MLS 20 Heritage Cup	San Jose Earthquakes	0–1	Seattle Sounders FC	San Jose, California
19:30 (PDT)	Luis Felipe (yellow card) 38'	Recap; Boxscore	Ruidíaz 62'	Stadium: Avaya Stadium; Attendance: 16,478; Referee: Kevin Stott

July 29, 2018 MLS 21	Seattle Sounders FC	3–1	New York City FC	Seattle, Washington
14:00 (PDT)	C. Roldan 36'; Svensson 51'; Shipp 86'	Recap; Boxscore	Medina 68'	Stadium: CenturyLink Field; Attendance: 39,528; Referee: Jair Marrufo

August 4, 2018 MLS 22	Minnesota United FC	1–2	Seattle Sounders FC	Minneapolis, Minnesota
17:00 (PDT)	Quintero 19'; Ibarra (yellow card) 90+1'	Recap; Boxscore	Francis (yellow card) 78'; Lodeiro 90+1' (pen.), (yellow card) 90+2'; Bruin 90+7'	Stadium: TCF Bank Stadium; Attendance: 24,482; Referee: Drew Fischer

August 12, 2018 MLS 23	Seattle Sounders FC	2–1	FC Dallas	Seattle, Washington
17:00 (PDT)	Marshall 41'; Svensson (yellow card) 51'; Lodeiro 63'; Kee-hee (yellow card) 78'	Recap; Boxscore	Badji 52'; Cannon (yellow card) 80'; Ziegler (red card) 90+1'	Stadium: CenturyLink Field; Attendance: 39,522; Referee: Ted Unkel

August 18, 2018 MLS 24	Seattle Sounders FC	5–0	LA Galaxy	Seattle, Washington
13:00 (PDT)	Marshall 3'; Shipp 18'; Carrasco 50' (o.g.); C. Roldan 59'; Ruidíaz 67'	Recap; Boxscore		Stadium: CenturyLink Field; Attendance: 44,213; Referee: Mark Geiger

August 26, 2018 MLS 25 Cascadia Cup	Portland Timbers	0–1	Seattle Sounders FC	Portland, Oregon
18:30 (PDT)	Chará (yellow card) 22'; Blanco (yellow card) 65'; Asprilla (yellow card) 87'	Recap; Boxscore	Smith (yellow card) 65'; Cascante 76' (o.g)	Stadium: Providence Park; Attendance: 21,144; Referee: Chris Penso

September 1, 2018 MLS 26	Seattle Sounders FC	3–1	Sporting Kansas City	Seattle, Washington
13:00 (PDT)	Ruidíaz 12'; Kee-hee (yellow card) 27'; Zusi 52' (o.g); Lodeiro 56' (pen.); Marshall (red card) 81'; Frei (yellow card) 82'	Recap; Boxscore	Rubio 2', (yellow card) 32'; Sánchez (yellow card) 43'; Opara (yellow card) 45+1'	Stadium: CenturyLink Field; Attendance: 39,530; Referee: Baldomero Toledo
Note: Marshall's red card was rescinded by an independent panel

September 15, 2018 MLS 27 Cascadia Cup	Vancouver Whitecaps FC	1–2	Seattle Sounders FC	Vancouver, British Columbia
19:00 (PDT)	Kamera 45'+4', (yellow card) 90'+6'; Teibert (yellow card) 48'	Recap; Boxscore	Ruidíaz 21', 42'; Alonso (yellow card) 41'; Leerdam (yellow card) 59'	Stadium: BC Place; Attendance: 27,863; Referee: Robert Sibiga

September 19, 2018 MLS 28	Seattle Sounders FC	0–1	Philadelphia Union	Seattle, Washington
20:00 (PDT)		Recap; Boxscore	Jones (yellow card) 52'; Elliott (yellow card) 78' (yellow-red card) 89'; Picault 90'+3'	Stadium: CenturyLink Field; Attendance: 39,536; Referee: Ismail Elfath

September 23, 2018 MLS 29	LA Galaxy	3–0	Seattle Sounders FC	Carson, California
16:00 (PDT)	Ibrahimović 9' (pen.); Feltscher (yellow card) 31'; Kamara 40'; Boateng 52'; Steres (yellow card) 75'	Recap; Boxscore		Stadium: StubHub Center; Attendance: 25,503; Referee: José Carlos Rivero

September 29, 2018 MLS 30	Seattle Sounders FC	4–0	Colorado Rapids	Seattle, Washington
13:00 (PDT)	Ruidíaz 22', 73'; Alonso (yellow card) 33'; Ludeiro 52' (pen.); Rodríguez 80'	Recap; Boxscore	Ford (yellow card) 25'; Smith (yellow card) 38'; Price (yellow card) 40'; Martinez (yellow card) 54'	Stadium: CenturyLink Field; Attendance: 40,042; Referee: Nima Saghafi

October 8, 2018 MLS 31	Seattle Sounders FC	4–1	Houston Dynamo	Seattle, Washington
19:30 (PDT)	Bruin 18'; C. Roldan 34'; Rodríguez 64', 73'	Recap; Boxscore	Cabezas (yellow card) 55'; Leonardo (yellow card) 76'; Beasley 87'	Stadium: CenturyLink Field; Attendance: 39,518; Referee: Drew Fischer

October 17, 2018 MLS 32	Orlando City SC	1–2	Seattle Sounders FC	Orlando, Florida
16:30 (PDT)	Dwyer 57'; Ascues (yellow card) 90'+2'	Recap; Boxscore	Rodríguez 3'; Bwana 13'; Delem (yellow card) 78'; A. Roldan (yellow card) 90'+5'	Stadium: Orlando City Stadium; Attendance: 22,344; Referee: Mark Geiger

October 21, 2018 [ Recap] MLS 33	Houston Dynamo	2–3	Seattle Sounders FC	Houston, Texas
14:00 (PDT)	K. Garcia 63'; B. García (yellow card) 74'; Manotas 89'	Recap; Boxscore	Marshall 26'; Svensson 49'; Nouhou (yellow card) 72'; Ruidíaz 89'	Stadium: BBVA Compass Stadium; Attendance: 19,127; Referee: David Gantar

October 28, 2018 MLS 34 Heritage Cup	Seattle Sounders FC	2–1	San Jose Earthquakes	Seattle, Washington
13:30 (PDT)	Ruidíaz 79', 90+3', (yellow card) 90+4'	Recap; Boxscore	Cavillo (yellow card) 53'; Marshall 64' (o.g.)	Stadium: CenturyLink Field; Attendance: 42,617; Referee: Hilario Grajeda

=== MLS Cup Playoffs ===
==== Western Conference Semifinals ====
November 4, 2018 Leg 1	Portland Timbers	2–1	Seattle Sounders FC	Portland, Oregon
2:30 pm (PST)	Ebobisse 17'; Blanco 29'	Preview	Ruidíaz 10'; Svensson (yellow card) 85'	Stadium: Providence Park; Attendance: 21,144; Referee: Ted Unkel

November 8, 2018 Leg 2	Seattle Sounders FC	3–2 (a.e.t.) (4–4 agg.) (2–4 p)	Portland Timbers	Seattle, Washington
7:30 pm (PST)	Ruidíaz 68', 90'+3', (yellow card) 114'; Alonso (yellow card) 70'; Lodeiro 97' (pen.)	Preview	Flores (yellow card) 41'; Blanco 78'; Asprilla 93'; Valeri (yellow card) 96'	Stadium: CenturyLink Field; Attendance: 39,542; Referee: Jair Marrufo
	Penalties
	Ruidíaz (penalty scored); Bruin (penalty missed); Alonso (penalty missed); Bwana (penalty scored)		(penalty scored) Melano; (penalty scored) Valeri; (penalty scored) Blanco; (penalty missed) Ridgewell; (penalty scored) Asprilla

=== CONCACAF Champions League ===
==== Round of 16 ====
February 22, 2018 First leg	Santa Tecla (El Salvador)	2–1	(United States) Seattle Sounders FC	Santa Tecla, El Salvador
19:00 (PST)	Mayén 67', 76' (pen.), (yellow card) 90'+4'	Recap; Boxscore	Lodeiro 15'; Delem (yellow card) 68'	Stadium: Estadio Las Delicias; Referee: Melvin Matamoros (Honduras)

March 1, 2018 Second leg	Seattle Sounders FC (United States)	4–0 (5–2 agg.)	(El Salvador) Santa Tecla	Seattle, Washington, U.S.
19:00 (PST)	Bruin 48'; Svensson (yellow card) 60'; Lodeiro 69'; Dempsey (yellow card) 75'; Marshall 81'; Eikrem 84'	Recap; Boxscore	Quintanilla (yellow card) 3'; Cornejo (yellow card) 14'; Mayén (yellow card) 53'	Stadium: CenturyLink Field; Attendance: 35,549; Referee: Walter López (Guatemala)

==== Quarter-finals ====
March 7, 2018 First leg	Seattle Sounders FC (United States)	1–0	(Mexico) Guadalajara	Seattle, Washington, U.S.
19:00 (PST)	Torres (yellow card) 17'; Dempsey 78'; McCrary (yellow card) 85'	Recap; Boxscore	Cota (yellow card) 42'; Cisneros (yellow card) 68'; Pulido (yellow card) 71'	Stadium: CenturyLink Field; Attendance: 42,885; Referee: Mario Escobar (Guatemala)

March 14, 2018 Second leg	Guadalajara (Mexico)	3–0 (3–1 agg.)	(United States) Seattle Sounders FC	Zapopan, Mexico
19:00 (PDT)	Alanís 50'; López 55'; Pineda (yellow card) 72'; Hernández (yellow card) 77'; Godínez 80'	Recap; Boxscore	Francis (yellow card) 11'; Dempsey (yellow card) 72'; McCrary (yellow card) 77'	Stadium: Estadio Akron; Referee: Óscar Moncada (Honduras)

=== U.S. Open Cup ===
June 6, 2018 Fourth round	Sacramento Republic FC	2–1 (a.e.t.)	Seattle Sounders FC	Sacramento, California
20:00 (PDT)	Iwasa 60'; Bijev (yellow card) 84'; Hall (yellow card) 85'; Matjašič 115'	Recap; Boxscore	Chenkam (yellow card) 11'; Roldan (yellow card) 62'; Ele (yellow card) 81'; Shipp 90+1'; Olsen (yellow card) 110'	Stadium: Papa Murphy's Park; Attendance: 5,619; Referee: Joseph Dickerson

== Statistics ==
=== Appearances and goals ===
Numbers after plus-sign(+) denote appearances as a substitute.

No.	Pos	Nat	Player	Total		Regular season		U.S. Open Cup		Playoffs		Champions League	
No.	Pos	Nat	Player	Apps	Goals	Apps	Goals	Apps	Goals	Apps	Goals	Apps	Goals
4	MF	(Sweden) SWE	Gustav Svensson	30	3	23+1	3	0	0	2	0	3+1	0
5	DF	(Cameroon) CMR	Nouhou	31	0	23+5	0	0	0	2	0	1	0
6	MF	(Cuba) CUB	Osvaldo Alonso	27	0	21+4	0	0	0	2	0	0	0
7	MF	(United States) USA	Cristian Roldan	39	4	34	4	0	0	1	0	4	0
8	MF	(Spain) ESP	Víctor Rodríguez	21	5	14+5	5	0	0	2	0	0	0
9	FW	(Peru) PER	Raúl Ruidíaz	16	13	13+1	10	0	0	2	3	0	0
10	MF	(Uruguay) URU	Nicolás Lodeiro	32	11	27	8	0	0	2	1	3	2
11	DF	(Australia) AUS	Brad Smith	6	0	6	0	0	0	0	0	0	0
13	FW	(United States) USA	Jordan Morris	1	0	0	0	0	0	0	0	1	0
14	DF	(United States) USA	Chad Marshall	35	5	30	4	0	0	1	0	4	1
15	DF	(Mexico) MEX	Tony Alfaro	7	0	3+1	0	1	0	0	0	2	0
16	MF	(United States) USA	Alex Roldan	22	0	7+13	0	0+1	0	0	0	0+1	0
17	FW	(United States) USA	Will Bruin	34	8	19+10	7	0	0	0+1	0	3+1	1
18	DF	(Netherlands) NED	Kelvin Leerdam	29	0	24+2	0	0	0	2	0	0+1	0
19	MF	(United States) USA	Harry Shipp	25	4	15+4	3	0+1	1	1+1	0	2+1	0
20	DF	(South Korea) KOR	Kim Kee-hee	32	0	28+1	0	0	0	2	0	0+1	0
21	MF	(Martinique) MTQ	Jordy Delem	18	1	10+6	1	1	0	0	0	1	0
23	MF	(United States) USA	Henry Wingo	10	0	2+3	0	1	0	0	0	2+2	0
24	GK	(Switzerland) SUI	Stefan Frei	39	0	33	0	0	0	2	0	4	0
25	GK	(United States) USA	Calle Brown	0	0	0	0	0	0	0	0	0	0
27	FW	(United States) USA	Lamar Neagle	10	0	0+6	0	1	0	0	0	0+3	0
29	DF	(Panama) PAN	Román Torres	16	0	7+6	0	0	0	1	0	2	0
30	DF	(United States) USA	Jordan McCrary	20	0	10+5	0	0	0	0+1	0	4	0
31	DF	(United States) USA	Nick Hinds [S2]	1	0	0	0	1	0	0	0	0	0
35	GK	(United States) USA	Bryan Meredith	2	0	1	0	1	0	0	0	0	0
37	FW	(United States) USA	Shandon Hopeau [S2]	1	0	0	0	1	0	0	0	0	0
70	FW	(Kenya) KEN	Handwalla Bwana	14	2	7+5	2	0	0	0+1	0	1	0
71	FW	(United States) USA	David Olsen [S2]	1	0	0	0	0+1	0	0	0	0	0
90	DF	(Costa Rica) CRC	Waylon Francis	16	0	5+6	0	1	0	0+1	0	3	0
92	DF	(Cameroon) CMR	Rodrigue Ele [S2]	1	0	0	0	1	0	0	0	0	0
99	FW	(Cameroon) CMR	Felix Chenkam	1	0	0	0	1	0	0	0	0	0
Players who left the club during the season:
2	FW	(United States) USA	Clint Dempsey	17	2	9+5	1	0	0	0	0	3	1
12	FW	(United States) USA	Seyi Adekoya	0	0	0	0	0	0	0	0	0	0
22	MF	(Norway) NOR	Magnus Wolff Eikrem	17	2	7+8	1	0	0	0	0	1+1	1
63	GK	(United States) USA	Zac Lubin	0	0	0	0	0	0	0	0	0	0

- Last updated: November 9, 2018
- Source: Team Stats

[S2] – S2 player^{[A]}

=== Top scorers ===
Rank	Position	Number	Name	MLS	MLS Playoffs	U.S. Open Cup	CONCACAF Champions League	Total
1	FW	9	(Peru) Raúl Ruidíaz	10	3	0	0	13
2	MF	10	(Uruguay) Nicolás Lodeiro	8	1	0	2	11
3	FW	17	(United States) Will Bruin	7	0	0	1	8
4	MF	8	(Spain) Víctor Rodríguez	5	0	0	0	5
4	DF	14	(United States) Chad Marshall	4	0	0	1	5
6	MF	7	(United States) Cristian Roldan	4	0	0	0	4
6	FW	19	(United States) Harry Shipp	3	0	1	0	4
8	MF	4	(Sweden) Gustav Svensson	3	0	0	0	3
9	FW	2	(United States) Clint Dempsey	1	0	0	1	2
9	MF	22	(Norway) Magnus Wolff Eikrem	1	0	0	1	2
9	FW	70	(Kenya) Handwalla Bwana	2	0	0	0	2
12	MF	21	(Martinique) Jordy Delem	1	0	0	0	1

- Last updated: November 9, 2018
- Source: Team Stats

=== Top assists ===
Rank	Position	Number	Name	MLS	MLS Playoffs	U.S. Open Cup	CONCACAF Champions League	Total
1	MF	10	(Uruguay) Nicolás Lodeiro	16	0	0	2	18
2	MF	7	(United States) Cristian Roldan	9	1	0	0	10
3	MF	8	(Spain) Víctor Rodríguez	6	0	0	0	6
4	FW	17	(United States) Will Bruin	5	0	0	0	5
4	DF	18	(Netherlands) Kelvin Leerdam	5	0	0	0	5
6	MF	19	(United States) Harry Shipp	3	0	0	0	3
6	MF	6	(Cuba) Osvaldo Alonso	3	0	0	0	3
6	FW	2	(United States) Clint Dempsey	1	0	0	2	3
9	DF	11	(Australia) Brad Smith	1	0	0	0	1
9	FW	70	(Kenya) Handwalla Bwana	1	0	0	0	1
9	DF	90	(Costa Rica) Waylon Francis	1	0	0	0	1
9	MF	22	(Norway) Magnus Wolff Eikrem	1	0	0	0	1
9	MF	16	(United States) Alex Roldan	1	0	0	0	1
9	FW	9	(Peru) Raúl Ruidíaz	1	0	0	0	1
9	DF	5	(Cameroon) Nouhou	1	0	0	0	1
9	MF	4	(Sweden) Gustav Svensson	1	0	0	0	1
9	DF	14	(United States) Chad Marshall	1	0	0	0	1
9	MF	16	(United States) Henry Wingo	0	0	0	1	1

- Last updated: November 9, 2018
- Source: Team Stats

=== Disciplinary record ===
No.	Pos.	Player	MLS			MLS Playoffs			U.S. Open Cup			CONCACAF Champions League			Total		
No.	Pos.	Player	Booked	(yellow card) (yellow-red card)	Sent off (straight red)	Booked	(yellow card) (yellow-red card)	Sent off (straight red)	Booked	(yellow card) (yellow-red card)	Sent off (straight red)	Booked	(yellow card) (yellow-red card)	Sent off (straight red)	Booked	(yellow card) (yellow-red card)	Sent off (straight red)
2	FW	(United States) Clint Dempsey	1	0	1	0	0	0	0	0	0	2	0	0	3	0	1
4	MF	(Sweden) Gustav Svensson	2	0	0	1	0	0	0	0	0	1	0	0	4	0	0
5	DF	(Cameroon) Nouhou	8	0	0	0	0	0	0	0	0	0	0	0	8	0	0
6	MF	(Cuba) Osvaldo Alonso	6	0	0	1	0	0	0	0	0	0	0	0	7	0	0
7	MF	(United States) Cristian Roldan	4	0	0	0	0	0	0	0	0	0	0	0	4	0	0
9	FW	(Peru) Raúl Ruidíaz	1	0	0	1	0	0	0	0	0	0	0	0	2	0	0
10	MF	(Uruguay) Nicolás Lodeiro	3	0	0	0	0	0	0	0	0	0	0	0	3	0	0
11	DF	(Australia) Brad Smith	1	0	0	0	0	0	0	0	0	0	0	0	1	0	0
14	DF	(United States) Chad Marshall	0	0	1	0	0	0	0	0	0	0	0	0	0	0	1
15	DF	(Mexico) Tony Alfaro	2	1	0	0	0	0	0	0	0	0	0	0	2	1	0
16	MF	(United States) Alex Roldan	2	0	0	0	0	0	1	0	0	0	0	0	3	0	0
17	FW	(United States) Will Bruin	1	0	0	0	0	0	0	0	0	0	0	0	1	0	0
18	DF	(Netherlands) Kelvin Leerdam	4	0	1	0	0	0	0	0	0	0	0	0	4	0	1
19	FW	(United States) Harry Shipp	1	0	0	0	0	0	0	0	0	0	0	0	1	0	0
20	DF	(South Korea) Kim Kee-Hee	4	0	0	0	0	0	0	0	0	0	0	0	4	0	0
21	MF	(Martinique) Jordy Delem	5	0	0	0	0	0	0	0	0	1	0	0	6	0	0
22	MF	(Norway) Magnus Wolff Eikrem	2	0	0	0	0	0	0	0	0	0	0	0	2	0	0
23	MF	(United States) Henry Wingo	1	0	0	0	0	0	0	0	0	0	0	0	1	0	0
24	GK	(Switzerland) Stefan Frei	1	0	0	0	0	0	0	0	0	0	0	0	1	0	0
27	FW	(United States) Lamar Neagle	1	0	0	0	0	0	0	0	0	0	0	0	1	0	0
29	DF	(Panama) Roman Torres	1	0	0	0	0	0	0	0	0	1	0	0	2	0	0
30	DF	(United States) Jordan McCrary	2	1	0	0	0	0	0	0	0	2	0	0	4	1	0
71	FW	(United States) David Olsen [S2]	0	0	0	0	0	0	1	0	0	0	0	0	1	0	0
90	DF	(Costa Rica) Waylon Francis	1	0	0	0	0	0	0	0	0	1	0	0	2	0	0
92	DF	(Cameroon) Rodrigue Ele [S2]	0	0	0	0	0	0	1	0	0	0	0	0	1	0	0
99	FW	(Cameroon) Felix Chenkam	0	0	0	0	0	0	1	0	0	0	0	0	1	0	0
Total			54	2	3	3	0	0	4	0	0	8	0	0	69	2	3

- Last updated: November 9, 2018
- Source: Disciplinary Stats

== Honors and awards ==
=== MLS Team of the Week ===
Week	Player	Opponent	Position	Ref
7	(United States) Cristian Roldan	Sporting Kansas City	Bench	
8	(Cuba) Osvaldo Alonso	Minnesota United FC	MF	
11	(Sweden) Gustav Svensson	Toronto FC, Portland Timbers	DF	
15	(Uruguay) Nicolás Lodeiro	D.C. United	FW	
16	(Switzerland) Stefan Frei	New York Red Bulls	Bench	
18	(Uruguay) Nicolás Lodeiro	Portland Timbers	Bench	
19	(Switzerland) Stefan Frei	Colorado Rapids, New England Revolution	GK	
20	(Cameroon) Nouhou	Atlanta United FC	Bench	
21	(Uruguay) Nicolás Lodeiro	Vancouver Whitecaps FC	MF	
21	(South Korea) Kim Kee-hee	Vancouver Whitecaps FC	DF	
21	(United States) Cristian Roldan	Vancouver Whitecaps FC	Bench	
22	(Switzerland) Stefan Frei	San Jose Earthquakes, New York City FC	GK	
22	(South Korea) Kim Kee-hee	San Jose Earthquakes, New York City FC	DF	
23	(Cuba) Osvaldo Alonso	Minnesota United FC	MF	
24	(Uruguay) Nicolás Lodeiro	FC Dallas	MF	
24	(United States) Chad Marshall	FC Dallas	DF	
25	(Uruguay) Nicolás Lodeiro	LA Galaxy	MF	
25	(United States) Chad Marshall	LA Galaxy	DF	
26	(South Korea) Kim Kee-hee	Portland Timbers	DF	
26	(Cuba) Osvaldo Alonso	Portland Timbers	Bench	
27	(Cuba) Osvaldo Alonso	Sporting Kansas City	MF	
27	(Australia) Brad Smith	Sporting Kansas City	DF	
29	(Peru) Raúl Ruidíaz	Vancouver Whitecaps FC	FW	
29	(Switzerland) Stefan Frei	Vancouver Whitecaps FC	Bench	
29	(Netherlands) Kelvin Leerdam	Vancouver Whitecaps FC	Bench	
31	(Uruguay) **Nicolás Lodeiro**	Colorado Rapids	MF	
31	(Peru) Raúl Ruidíaz	Colorado Rapids	Bench	
32	(United States) Cristian Roldan	Houston Dynamo	Bench	
32	(United States) Will Bruin	Houston Dynamo	Bench	
34	(Uruguay) **Nicolás Lodeiro**	Orlando City SC, Houston Dynamo	MF	
34	(United States) Chad Marshall	Orlando City SC, Houston Dynamo	DF	
35	(Peru) Raúl Ruidíaz	San Jose Earthquakes	FW	

Bold indicates Audi Player Index Spotlight

=== MLS Coach of the Week ===
Week	Coach	Opponent	Ref
22	(United States) Brian Schmetzer	San Jose Earthquakes, New York City FC	

=== MLS Goal of the Week ===
Week	Player	Opponent	Ref
23	(United States) Will Bruin	Minnesota United FC	
34	(Spain) Víctor Rodríguez	Orlando City SC	

=== MLS Best XI ===
Player	Position	Ref
Chad Marshall	Defender	

=== MLS Save of the Year ===
Player	Opponent	Ref
Stefan Frei	Colorado Rapids July 4	

== Transfers ==
For transfers in, dates listed are when Sounders FC officially signed the players to the roster. Transactions where only the rights to the players are acquired are not listed. For transfers out, dates listed are when Sounders FC officially removed the players from its roster, not when they signed with another club. If a player later signed with another club, his new club will be noted, but the date listed here remains the one when he was officially removed from Sounders FC roster.

=== In ===
No.	Pos.	Player	Transferred from	Fee/notes	Date	Source
90	DF	(Costa Rica) Waylon Francis	(United States) Columbus Crew	Traded for $50,000 GAM	December 14, 2017	
70	MF	(Kenya) Handwalla Bwana	(United States) University of Washington	Signed HGP Deal	January 11, 2018	
22	MF	(Norway) Magnus Wolff Eikrem	(Sweden) Malmö FF	Free Transfer	January 30, 2018	
16	MF	(United States) Alex Roldan	(United States) Seattle University	Draft Pick	February 13, 2018	
30	DF	(United States) Jordan McCrary	(Canada) Toronto FC II	Free Transfer	February 13, 2018	
25	GK	(United States) Calle Brown	(United States) Houston Dynamo	Free Transfer	February 20, 2018	
20	DF	(South Korea) Kim Kee-hee	(China) Shanghai Shenhua	Free Transfer	February 27, 2018	
99	FW	(Cameroon) Felix Chenkam	(United States) Seattle Sounders FC 2	Free	May 25, 2018	
9	FW	(Peru) Raúl Ruidíaz	(Mexico) Monarcas Morelia	DP contract	June 29, 2018	
63	GK	(United States) Zac Lubin	(United States) Phoenix Rising FC	On loan	June 30, 2018	
11	DF	(Australia) Brad Smith	(England) A.F.C. Bournemouth	On loan	August 8, 2018	

==== Draft picks ====
Draft picks are not automatically signed to the team roster. Only those who are signed to a contract will be listed as transfers in. Only trades involving draft picks and executed after the start of 2018 MLS SuperDraft will be listed in the notes.

Date	Player	Number	Position	Previous club	Notes	Ref
January 19, 2017	Alex Roldan	16	MF	Seattle University	MLS SuperDraft 1st Round Pick (#22)	
January 19, 2017	Markus Fjørtoft	68	DF	Duke University	MLS SuperDraft 2nd Round Pick (#45)	
January 21, 2017	Chris Bared		DF	Villanova University	MLS SuperDraft 3rd Round Pick (#68)	

=== Out ===
No.	Pos.	Player	Transferred to	Fee/notes	Date	Source
16	MF	(Scotland) Calum Mallace	(United States) Los Angeles FC	Option declined; Selected #47 in 2017 MLS Re-Entry Draft	December 12, 2017	
3	MF	(United States) Brad Evans	(United States) Sporting Kansas City	Out of contract	December 12, 2017	
33	FW	(Trinidad and Tobago) Joevin Jones	(Germany) Darmstadt	Out of contract	December 12, 2017	
1	GK	(United States) Tyler Miller	(United States) Los Angeles FC	Selected #1 in 2017 MLS Expansion Draft	December 12, 2017	
11	MF	(United States) Aaron Kovar	(United States) Los Angeles FC	Out on Loan	January 24, 2018	
91	DF	(Jamaica) Oniel Fisher	(United States) D.C. United	$50,000 GAM	February 7, 2018	
32	MF	(United States) Zach Mathers	(United States) Las Vegas Lights FC	Waived	March 2, 2018	
12	FW	(United States) Seyi Adekoya	(Denmark) Vendsyssel FF	Mutual Termination	April 3, 2018	
22	MF	(Norway) Magnus Wolff Eikrem	(Norway) Molde FK	Waived	July 20, 2018	
2	FW	(United States) Clint Dempsey		Retired	August 29, 2018	

== Notes ==
A. ^{a} Players who are under contract with Seattle Sounders FC 2.
