= List of Seattle Sounders FC draft picks =

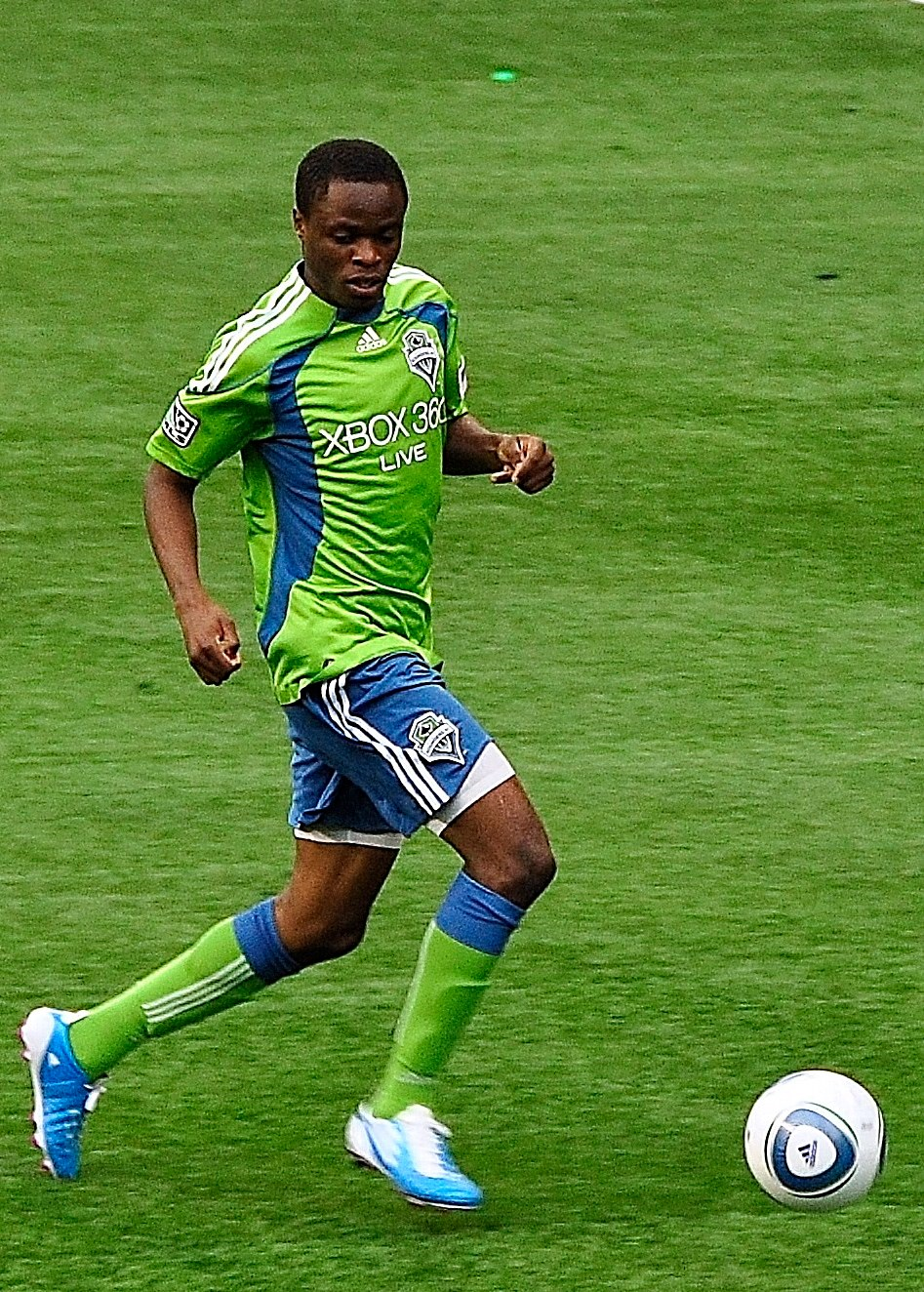
Steve Zakuani was selected first overall in the 2009 MLS SuperDraft by the Sounders

Seattle Sounders FC is a professional American soccer team based in Seattle, Washington, that competes in Major League Soccer (MLS), the top-flight league in the United States soccer league system. They joined the league as an expansion team in 2009 and play their home matches at Lumen Field, a multipurpose stadium near Downtown Seattle. The MLS team are the third to use the Sounders name, following the original franchise that played in the North American Soccer League from 1974 to 1983 and a second club that played in various second-division leagues from 1994 to 2008.

The team have participated in every edition of the MLS SuperDraft, the league's annual college player draft, since they joined MLS. The use of a draft is similar to other major sports leagues in the United States and Canada, but uncommon in soccer. The draft order is determined by the previous season's standings and progress in the MLS Cup Playoffs. Expansion teams receive the earliest picks, followed by returning teams with the worst win–loss records; for playoff teams, the order is determined by the round they were eliminated in, followed by points per game during the regular season. Draft picks are tradeable for players, other picks, or forms of compensation such as general allocation money or international roster slots.

Since the 2024 MLS SuperDraft, players from American colleges have been eligible for the draft beginning in their sophomore year; the league previously restricted draft eligibility to players in their senior year unless they had signed a Generation Adidas contract. Non-collegiate international players are also allowed to be selected if they are nominated by clubs for the league's draft-eligible list. A team has priority rights to sign a selected player until the end of the following year following the draft; players who return to college or sign for a professional team elsewhere after their selection are not allowed to enter a later draft.

The Sounders were granted the first overall pick in the 2009 MLS SuperDraft due to their status as an expansion team and selected 20-year-old forward Steve Zakuani from the University of Akron. The number and rounds and picks in the SuperDraft have fluctuated based on the needs of teams and the expansion of MLS, which grew from 15 teams in 2009 to 30 teams in 2025. The SuperDraft was cut from four rounds to two by 2012 due to the reintroduction of the supplemental draft, which replaced the later rounds. The supplemental draft was eliminated in 2014 and replaced by a single, expanded version of the SuperDraft with four rounds that was used until a reduction to three rounds in 2021.

The SuperDraft was held concurrently with the annual convention of the National Soccer Coaches Association of America until the draft became a virtual conference in 2020. It had declined in importance by the late 2010s as the development of young players had shifted to team academies and the signing of homegrown players. Teams had also skipped all their picks in later rounds or traded away their picks; the Sounders had traded their lone first-round picks in several years and only selected one player in the 2021 draft. In the most recent draft in December 2025, the Sounders selected midfielder Joe Dale from Washington and goalkeeper Stockton Short from Utah Tech.

== Draft history by year ==
Seattle Sounders FC draft history by year
Draft	Rounds	Original draft order (Note: Draft orders change based on trades and other factors. This is the original draft order based on the previous season's record.)	Total selections	First-round pick(s)
2009	4	1st (Note: Seattle Sounders FC was awarded the first pick in the 2009 MLS SuperDraft due to their status as an expansion team.)	4	Steve Zakuani (1st overall)
2010	4	11th	3	David Estrada (11th overall)
2011	3	11th	5	—
2012	2	15th	2	Andrew Duran (15th overall)
2013	2	15th	2	Eriq Zavaleta (10th overall)
2014	4	13th	4	Damion Lowe (8th overall)
2015	4	19th	6	Cristian Roldan (16th overall)
2016	4	15th	4	—
2017	4	22nd	5	Brian Nana-Sinkam (22nd overall)
2018	4	22nd	3	Alex Roldán (22nd overall)
2019	4	20th	3	Tucker Bone (20th overall)
2020	4	26th	3	—
2021	3	26th	1	—
2022	3	20th	2	—
2023	3	9th	2	—
2024	3	23rd	3	Kalani Kossa-Rienzi (23rd overall)
2025	3	28th	3	Ryan Baer (28th overall)
2025	2	21st	2	—

== Key ==
Key
†	Indicates the player signed a Generation Adidas contract prior to the draft

== 2009 MLS SuperDraft ==
Seattle Sounders FC's selections in the 2009 MLS SuperDraftSource: MLS, FBref
Round	Pick #	Overall	Name	Nationality	Position (Note: Position reflects their listing in FBref and may not be representative of a player's position on a college or professional team.)	College
1	1	1	Steve Zakuani †	DR Congo	Forward	Akron
2	1	16	Evan Brown	United States	Defender	Wake Forest
3	1	31	Jared Karkas	United States	Defender	Azusa Pacific
4	1	46	Mike Fucito	United States	Defender	Harvard

== 2010 MLS SuperDraft ==
Seattle Sounders FC's selections in the 2010 MLS SuperDraftSource: MLS, FBref
Round	Pick #	Overall	Name	Nationality	Position	College
1	11	11	David Estrada	United States	Forward/Midfielder	UCLA
2	11	27	Mike Seamon	United States	Midfielder	Villanova
4	11	59	Jamel Wallace	United States	Defender	San Diego State

== 2011 MLS SuperDraft ==
Seattle Sounders FC's selections in the 2011 MLS SuperDraftSource: MLS, FBref
Round	Pick #	Overall	Name	Nationality	Position	College
2	2	20	Michael Tetteh †	Ghana	Defender/Midfielder	UC Santa Barbara
2	3	21	Leone Cruz	United States	Defender	Southern Methodist
2	9	27	Servando Carrasco	United States	Midfielder	California
2	11	29	Bryan Meredith	United States	Goalkeeper	Monmouth
3	11	47	Alex Caskey	United States	Midfielder	Davidson

== 2012 MLS SuperDraft ==
Seattle Sounders FC's selections in the 2012 MLS SuperDraftSource: MLS, FBref
Round	Pick #	Overall	Name	Nationality	Position	College
1	15	15	Andrew Duran	United States	Defender	Creighton
2	15	34	Babayele Sodade	United States	Forward	UA Birmingham

== 2013 MLS SuperDraft ==
Seattle Sounders FC's selections in the 2013 MLS SuperDraftSource: MLS, FBref
Round	Pick #	Overall	Name	Nationality	Position	College
1	10	10	Eriq Zavaleta †	El Salvador	Defender	Indiana
2	16	35	Dylan Remick	United States	Defender	Brown

== 2014 MLS SuperDraft ==
Seattle Sounders FC's selections in the 2014 MLS SuperDraftSource: MLS, FBref
Round	Pick #	Overall	Name	Nationality	Position	College
1	8	8	Damion Lowe †	Jamaica	Defender	Hartford
2	2	21	Jimmy Ockford	United States	Defender	Louisville
3	17	55	Stefano Rijssel	Suriname	Forward/Midfielder	MLS Caribbean Combine (Note: Non-collegiate international player)
4	20	77	Fábio Pereira	Brazil	Midfielder	Michigan

== 2015 MLS SuperDraft ==
Seattle Sounders FC's selections in the 2015 MLS SuperDraftSource: MLS, FBref
Round	Pick #	Overall	Name	Nationality	Position	College
1	16	16	Cristian Roldan †	United States	Midfielder	Washington
2	12	33	Tyler Miller	United States	Goalkeeper	Northwestern
2	19	40	Oniel Fisher	Jamaica	Defender/Midfielder	New Mexico
3	6	48	Andy Craven	United States	Forward	North Carolina
4	13	75	Charlie Lyon	United States	Defender	Marquette
4	18	80	Andy Bevin	United States	Midfielder	West Virginia

== 2016 MLS SuperDraft ==
Seattle Sounders FC's selections in the 2016 MLS SuperDraftSource: MLS, FBref
Round	Pick #	Overall	Name	Nationality	Position	College
2	7	27	Tony Alfaro	United States	Defender	Cal State Dominguez Hills
2	15	35	Zach Mathers	United States	Midfielder	Duke
3	13	54	Emir Alihodžić	Bosnia and Herzegovina	Midfielder	Omaha
3	15	76	Michael Nelson	United States	Goalkeeper	Old Dominion

== 2017 MLS SuperDraft ==
Seattle Sounders FC's selections in the 2017 MLS SuperDraftSource: MLS, FBref
Round	Pick #	Overall	Name	Nationality	Position	College
1	22	22	Brian Nana-Sinkam	England	Defender	Stanford
2	22	44	Dominic Oduro	Ghana	Midfielder	FC Nordsjælland
3	12	56	Bakie Goodman	United States	Midfielder	Georgetown
3	22	66	Jake Stovall	United States	Defender	Wright State
4	22	88	Kyle Bjornethun	United States	Defender	Seattle

== 2018 MLS SuperDraft ==
Seattle Sounders FC's selections in the 2018 MLS SuperDraftSource: MLS, FBref
Round	Pick #	Overall	Name	Nationality	Position	College
1	22	22	Alex Roldán	El Salvador	Defender/Midfielder	Seattle
2	22	45	Markus Fjørtoft	Norway	Defender	Duke
3	22	68	Chris Bared	United States	Defender	Villanova

== 2019 MLS SuperDraft ==
Seattle Sounders FC's selections in the 2019 MLS SuperDraftSource: MLS, FBref
Round	Pick #	Overall	Name	Nationality	Position	College
1	20	20	Tucker Bone	United States	Midfielder	Air Force
2	20	44	Joel Rydstrand	Sweden	Midfielder	Creighton
3	20	68	Aleks Berkolds	United States	Defender	San Diego State

== 2020 MLS SuperDraft ==
Seattle Sounders FC's selections in the 2020 MLS SuperDraftSource: MLS, FBref
Round	Pick #	Overall	Name	Nationality	Position	College
2	9	35	Danny Reynolds	England	Defender	UNC Wilmington
2	26	52	Timo Mehlich	Germany	Midfielder	UNLV
3	26	78	Julian Avila-Good	Canada	Defender	Seattle

== 2021 MLS SuperDraft ==
Seattle Sounders FC's selections in the 2021 MLS SuperDraftSource: MLS, FBref
Round	Pick #	Overall	Name	Nationality	Position	College
3	26	80	TJ Bush	United States	Goalkeeper	James Madison

== 2022 MLS SuperDraft ==
Seattle Sounders FC's selections in the 2022 MLS SuperDraftSource: MLS, FBref
Round	Pick #	Overall	Name	Nationality	Position	College
2	15	43	Achille Robin	France	Defender	Washington
3	20	76	Hal Uderitz	United States	Midfielder	Seattle

== 2023 MLS SuperDraft ==
Seattle Sounders FC's selections in the 2023 MLS SuperDraftSource: MLS, FBref
Round	Pick #	Overall	Name	Nationality	Position	College
2	9	38	Eythor Bjørgolfsson	Norway	Forward	Kentucky
3	1	59	Blake Bowen	United States	Defender	San Diego State

== 2024 MLS SuperDraft ==
Seattle Sounders FC's selections in the 2024 MLS SuperDraftSource: MLS, FBref
Round	Pick #	Overall	Name	Nationality	Position	College
1	23	23	Kalani Kossa-Rienzi	United States	Defender	Washington
2	23	52	Antino Lopez	United States	Defender	Duke
3	23	81	Buba Fofanah	Sierra Leone	Forward	Portland

== 2025 MLS SuperDraft ==
Seattle Sounders FC's selections in the 2025 MLS SuperDraftSource: MLS, FBref
Round	Pick #	Overall	Name	Nationality	Position	College
1	28	28	Ryan Baer	United States	Midfielder	West Virginia
2	28	58	Demian Alvarez	United States	Defender	Seattle
3	16	76	Trace Terry	United States	Forward	Bowling Green State

== 2026 MLS SuperDraft ==
Seattle Sounders FC's selections in the 2026 MLS SuperDraftSource: MLS, FBref
Round	Pick #	Overall	Name	Nationality	Position	College
2	21	51	Joe Dale	United States	Midfielder	Washington Huskies
3	21	81	Stockton Short	United States	Goalkeeper	Utah Tech Trailblazers
