= Riley Grant =

American soccer player (born 1995)

Personal information
- Full name: Riley Neal Grant
- Date of birth: January 27, 1995 (age 31)
- Place of birth: Cleveland, Ohio, United States
- Height: 6 ft 1 in (1.85 m)
- Position: Defender

Youth career
- 2005–2009: Ohio Select FC
- 2009–2012: Everest SC
- 2012–2013: Internationals SC

College career
| Years | Team | Apps | (Gls) |
| 2013 | Akron Zips | 11 | (0) |
| 2014–2016 | Penn State Nittany Lions | 53 | (2) |

Senior career*
| Years | Team | Apps | (Gls) |
| 2016 | AFC Cleveland | 7 | (3) |
| 2017 | Seattle Sounders FC 2 | 12 | (1) |
| 2018 | Cleveland SC | 7 | (1) |
| 2018 | Enosis Neon Paralimni | 1 | (0) |
- * Club domestic league appearances and goals as of 8 December 2018

Riley Neal Grant (born January 27, 1995) is an American soccer player who plays as a defender. Previously, he played professionally for Seattle Sounders FC 2, and also appeared for AFC Cleveland and Cleveland SC, where he was used as a forward.

== Youth and college ==
Born in Cleveland, Ohio, Grant was a three-year letterwinner at Copley High School, playing with the Indians through his junior year. Although a steady contributor his first two years, he broke out as a junior, notching 16 goals and eight assists. Grant was named second-team All-Ohio, as well as all-Suburban League and all-Northeast Region. He did not play with Copley as a senior, instead choosing to play club soccer with Internationals SC in the U.S. Soccer Development Academy. Grant was rated as a four-star recruit, according to Top Drawer Soccer, and committed to play for the Akron Zips and new head coach Jared Embick.

Grant found playing time hard to come by in what turned out to be his lone season at Akron, appearing in only half of the Zips' games on the year. His 11 appearances did include playing in both games at the MAC Tournament, but he did not make an appearance in the NCAA Tournament as the Zips were eliminated in the second round. Following his freshman year, Grant announced his departure from Akron and transferred to Penn State. In his inaugural season with the Nittany Lions, he appeared 18 times and scored his first collegiate goal, coming in a 6–2 victory over Penn on September 24, 2014. Grant also added the game-winning assist in a victory over his former team, Akron, on November 5. As a junior, he started all 18 matches for the Nittany Lions, moving into a more attacking role than what he had seen as a sophomore. Grant scored what would be his final collegiate goal on October 3, 2015, helping Penn State to a 2–0 victory over Rutgers. He finished out his Penn State career with 17 appearances as a senior, ending his time with the Nittany Lions with two goals and five assists from 53 appearances.

=== AFC Cleveland ===
Following his junior year at Penn State, Grant played in the NPSL with his hometown club, AFC Cleveland. He officially signed with the Royals on May 3, 2016, just eight days before the start of the season. Grant went on to make eight appearances in all competitions for Cleveland, tallying three goals. Although he did not make an appearance during the playoffs, the Royals went on to win the NPSL championship, topping Sonoma County Sol in the championship match.

== Club career ==
=== Seattle Sounders FC 2 ===
On March 22, 2017, Grant signed his first professional contract, joining USL club Seattle Sounders FC 2. He was one of seven players signed on the day by S2, becoming the club's tenth player, and fourth defender, under contract for the year. Grant made his professional and club debut four days later, starting in the season-opening 2–1 defeat against Sacramento Republic. He notched his only goal for the club on June 10, a header two minutes into first half stoppage time against Rio Grande Valley FC Toros, although S2 would go on to lose the match 3–1. In late July, Grant was released by S2 after falling out of the rotation in the defense. He departed the club with one goal in 12 appearances.

=== Cleveland SC ===
Grant returned to his hometown of Cleveland for the 2018 season, dropping out of the professional game by signing with NPSL expansion club Cleveland SC. He was initially announced as part of the club's preliminary roster on April 11, 2018, then was confirmed as part of the official roster on April 24. Grant was set to be one of two former professional players to join the club for its first season, alongside Bradley Ruhaak, but Ruhaak left the club before the start of the season and instead joined Michigan Bucks. Grant made his Cleveland debut on June 3, starting away to FC Buffalo in a scoreless draw. On June 24, he scored his first goal for the club, providing the third strike in a 4–0 takedown of Syracuse FC. Grant did not appear during the playoffs as Cleveland was eliminated in the Midwest semifinals; he finished the season having scored once in seven appearances for CSC.

== Career statistics ==
As of September 2, 2018

| Club | Season | League | | | Playoffs | | Cup (Note: Appearance in the U.S. Open Cup) | | Continental | | Total | |
| Club | Season | Division | Apps | Goals | Apps | Goals | Apps | Goals | Apps | Goals | Apps | Goals |
|---|---|---|---|---|---|---|---|---|---|---|---|---|
| AFC Cleveland | 2016 | NPSL | 7 | 3 | 0 | 0 | 1 | 0 | – | | 8 | 3 |
| Seattle Sounders FC 2 | 2017 | USL | 12 | 1 | – | | – | | – | | 12 | 1 |
| Cleveland SC | 2018 | NPSL | 7 | 1 | 0 | 0 | – | | – | | 7 | 1 |
| Enosis Neon Paralimni | 2018–19 | Cypriot First Division | 1 | 0 | – | | 0 | 0 | – | | 1 | 0 |
| Career total | | | 27 | 5 | 0 | 0 | 1 | 0 | 0 | 0 | 28 | 5 |

== Honors ==
AFC Cleveland

- National Premier Soccer League: 2016
- Midwest Region (Playoffs): 2016
- Great Lakes Conference (Playoffs): 2016
- Great Lakes Conference (Regular Season): 2016
