= Ibrahim Usman =

Nigerian footballer

Personal information
- Full name: Ibrahim Usman
- Date of birth: 23 July 1999 (age 27)
- Place of birth: Lagos, Nigeria
- Height: 1.81 m (5 ft 11 in)
- Position: Left-back

Youth career
- –2018: ECO Lagos

Senior career*
Years	Team	Apps	(Gls)
2018	Seattle Sounders FC 2	26	(0)
2019–2020	Gazélec Ajaccio	5	(0)
2020–202?	Prince Kazeem FC		

International career
- Nigeria U20
- * Club domestic league appearances and goals as of 08:40, 28 April 2020 (UTC)

Ibrahim Usman (born 23 July 1999) is a Nigerian professional footballer.

== Career ==
On 14 February 2018, Usman signed with the Seattle Sounders FC 2 of the United Soccer League from ECO FC Lagos.
