= Steve Whyte =

Australian soccer player

Personal information
- Date of birth: 24 July 1996 (age 30)
- Place of birth: Australia
- Height: 1.84 m (6 ft 1/2 in)
- Position: Midfielder

Team information
- Current team: Hume City

Youth career
- The Entrance Bateau Bay
- 2012–2017: Central Coast Mariners

Senior career*
Years	Team	Apps	(Gls)
2014–2017	CCM Academy	70	(6)
2017	Central Coast Mariners	0	(0)
2017	Seattle Sounders FC 2	7	(0)
2018–2022	Olympic FC	123	(18)
2023–2025	Melbourne Knights	55	(0)
2025-	Hume City		
- * Club domestic league appearances and goals as of 20 November 2025

Steve Whyte in an Australian professional footballer who plays for Melbourne Knights in the National Premier Leagues Victoria.

Whyte played youth football for Central Coast Mariners, before moving overseas to Seattle in 2017, where he made his professional debut.

In 2018 Whyte returned to Australia to link up with his former Central Coast Mariners coach Ben Cahn at Olympic FC.

== Playing career ==
Whyte signed with Seattle Sounders FC 2 in the United Soccer League in August 2017, having linked with the club through former Mariner and now S2 assistant coach John Hutchinson.
