= Lorenzo Ramos =

American soccer player

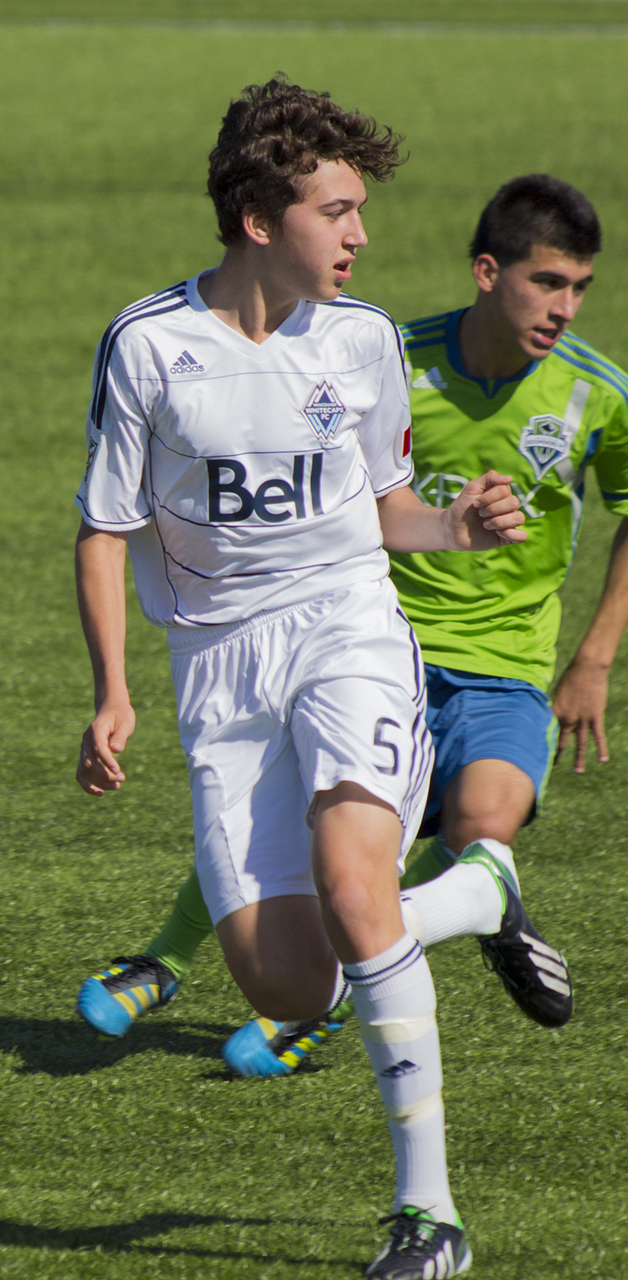
- Lorenzo Ramos playing for Seattle Sounders FC in 2013.

Personal information
- Full name: Lorenzo Ramos Garcia
- Date of birth: January 29, 1997 (age 29)
- Place of birth: Fife, Washington, United States
- Height: 1.75 m (5 ft 9 in)
- Position: Midfielder

Youth career
- 2011–2015: Seattle Sounders FC

Senior career*
Years	Team	Apps	(Gls)
2015–2017	Seattle Sounders FC 2	51	(1)
2019	Los Angeles Force		
- * Club domestic league appearances and goals as of 17:25, 21 October 2017 (UTC)

Lorenzo Ramos Garcia (born January 29, 1997) is an American soccer player who plays as a midfielder.

== Professional career ==
Ramos joined the Seattle Sounders FC Academy since 2011. On April 11, 2015, he made his professional debut for Seattle Sounders FC 2, a USL affiliate club of Seattle Sounders FC. He came on as a sub in the final minute of S2's 2–1 victory over Portland Timbers 2.
