= Francisco Narbón =

Panamanian footballer (born 1995)

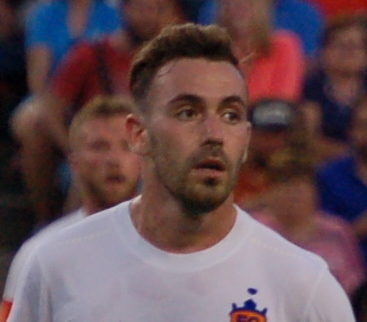
- Narbón playing for FC Cincinnati in 2016

Personal information
- Full name: Francisco Javier Narbón Cuadra
- Date of birth: 11 February 1995 (age 31)
- Place of birth: Panama City, Panama
- Height: 1.78 m (5 ft 10 in)
- Positions: Defender; defensive midfielder; midfielder

Team information
- Current team: Plaza Amador
- Number: 59

Youth career
- 2011–2013: Shattuck-Saint Mary's
- 2013–2014: Chepo

College career
Years	Team	Apps	(Gls)
2014	James Madison Dukes	16	(0)

Senior career*
Years	Team	Apps	(Gls)
2016	FC Cincinnati	4	(0)
2017–2018	Seattle Sounders FC 2	35	(1)
2019–	Plaza Amador	27	(3)

International career
2011	Panama U17	9	(0)
2013–2015	Panama U20	8	(1)
2014–2016	Panama U23	7	(0)
2014–Today	Panama	4	(0)
- * Club domestic league appearances and goals as of 15:29, 22 September 2019 (UTC)

Francisco Javier Narbón Cuadra (born 11 February 1995) is a Panamanian footballer who plays for Plaza Amador and the Panama national football team.

== Career ==
=== Youth and college ===
Narbón spent his youth career with the Shattuck-Saint Mary's Soccer Academy as well as Chepo before signing a letter of intent to play college soccer at James Madison University. He made 16 appearances in his freshman year with the Dukes. He was considered rookie of the year and player of the match in various occasions.

=== Professional ===
On 7 December 2015, it was announced that Narbón had signed for United Soccer League expansion club FC Cincinnati.

Narbón signed with Seattle Sounders FC 2 of the USL Championship on 24 March 2017. During a match against Swope Park Rangers on 5 July 2018, he fractured his right tibia and fibula following a tackle. Narbón underwent surgery in Seattle and later signed with Plaza Amador in Panama.

=== International ===
He played for Panama at the 2011 FIFA U-17 World Cup in Mexico as well as at the 2015 FIFA U-20 World Cup in New Zealand.

On 6 August 2014, Narbon made his senior national team debut for Panama in a 3–0 defeat to Peru. He was also called up for Panama's final two matches of the 2014 Copa Centroamericana, but didn't feature in any of them.
