= Felix Chenkam =

Cameroonian footballer

Personal information
- Full name: Felix Emmanuel Cédric Chenkam Nganle
- Date of birth: 28 December 1998 (age 27)
- Place of birth: Douala, Cameroon
- Height: 1.80 m (5 ft 11 in)
- Position: Forward

Team information
- Current team: Union Namur

Senior career*
Years	Team	Apps	(Gls)
- Union Douala
2016	Rainbow Bamenda		
2017–2018	→ Seattle Sounders FC 2 (loan)	28	(9)
2018	Seattle Sounders FC	0	(0)
2019	MFK Vyškov	0	(0)
2019–2020	Union Douala	-	(-)
2020–2022	Salerm Puente Genil	1	(2)
2022	Viveiro CF	-	(-)
2022–2023	RAS Monceau	-	(-)
2023–	Union Namur	9	(2)

International career^{‡}
2016–2017	Cameroon U20	4	(1)
- * Club domestic league appearances and goals as of 10 December 2023 ‡ National team caps and goals as of 20 April 2017

Felix Emmanuel Cédric Chenkam Nganle (born 28 December 1998), commonly known as Felix Chenkam, is a Cameroonian footballer who plays as a forward for Union Namur.

== Club career ==
Chenkam began his career in Cameroon, playing with Union Douala and Rainbow Bamenda, before signing with Seattle Sounders FC 2 in the United Soccer League in March 2017.

Chenkam made his Sounders 2 debut on 26 March 2017, coming on as a substitute in the 73rd minute of the season opening 2–1 loss to Sacramento. Chenkam's first start and first goal with S2 both came on 15 April 2017 in a 2–1 win over Los Angeles.

Chenkam's contract option was declined by Seattle on 19 November 2018. In October 2019, Chenkam returned to Union Douala.

In 2020, Chenkam joined Salerm Puente Genil on a free transfer. He then joined Viveiro CF in January 2022.

He left Spain just six months later to join amateur Belgian side RAS Monceau.

On July 15, 2023, he joined Belgian third-tier side Union Namur.

== International career ==
Chenkam was selected to represent the Cameroon U20s at the 2017 Africa U-20 Cup of Nations in Zambia after helping them qualify by scoring a goal in a 3–0 win over Libya on 10 July 2016. Chenkam made 3 substitute appearances at the tournament, as Cameroon was knocked out of the tournament at the group stage.

== Career statistics ==
Club	Season	League			Playoffs			Domestic Cup			Continental Cup			Total		
Club	Season	Apps	Goals	Assists	Apps	Goals	Assists	Apps	Goals	Assists	Apps	Goals	Assists	Apps	Goals	Assists
Seattle Sounders FC 2
Seattle Sounders FC 2	2017	7	3	0	0	0	0	-	-	-	-	-	-	7	3	0
Sounders FC 2 total		7	3	0	0	0	0	-	-	-	-	-	-	7	3	0
Career total		7	3	0	0	0	0	0	0	0	0	0	0	7	3	0

Stats accurate as of 1 June 2017
