= Denso Ulysse =

Haitian footballer (born 1998)

Personal information
- Date of birth: 20 November 1998 (age 27)
- Place of birth: Gonaïves, Haiti
- Height: 1.73 m (5 ft 8 in)
- Position: Defender

Team information
- Current team: Real Hope FA

Senior career*
Years	Team	Apps	(Gls)
2017	Real du Cap		
2017–2019	Tacoma Defiance	58	(0)
2020	Inter Miami	0	(0)
2021	Richmond Kickers	2	(0)
2022	Northern Colorado Hailstorm	9	(0)
2025–	Real Hope FA	0	(0)

International career^{‡}
2016	Haiti U20		
2017	Haiti U23		
- * Club domestic league appearances and goals as of 10:20, 9 October 2022 (UTC) ‡ National team caps and goals as of 20:10, 11 June 2017 (UTC)

Denso Ulysse (born 20 November 1998) is a Haitian footballer who plays as a defender for Real Hope FA.

== Club career ==
Ulysse joined the Seattle Sounders FC Academy from Haitian side Real Hope Football Academy du Cap-Haïtien in March 2017. He was signed to reserve side Seattle Sounders FC 2 and made his debut on 25 April 2017 in a 3–2 home defeat to San Antonio FC, coming on as a 60th-minute substitute for Henry Wingo.

Denso was signed by Major League Soccer expansion side Inter Miami CF on December 23, 2019.

On September 9, 2021, Denso signed with the Richmond Kickers of USL League One.

Ulysse moved to new USL League One club Northern Colorado Hailstorm on 25 February 2022, ahead of their inaugural season. Following the 2022 season, Northern Colorado declined his contract option.
