= Shandon Hopeau =

American soccer player (born 1998)

Personal information
- Full name: Shandon Hopeau
- Date of birth: December 1, 1998 (age 27)
- Place of birth: Kapolei, Hawaii, United States
- Height: 5 ft 10 in (1.78 m)
- Position: Midfielder

Youth career
- –2015: Hawaii Rush
- 2016–2017: Seattle Sounders FC

Senior career*
Years	Team	Apps	(Gls)
2016–2020	Tacoma Defiance	72	(8)
2019	→ Seattle Sounders FC (loan)	1	(0)
2020–2021	Seattle Sounders FC	1	(0)
2021	→ San Antonio FC (loan)	11	(0)
- * Club domestic league appearances and goals as of November 7, 2021

Shandon Hopeau (born December 1, 1998) is an American soccer player who currently plays as a midfielder.

== Career ==
=== Youth ===
Hopeau, from Kapolei, Hawaii, began his youth career with Hawaii Rush Soccer Club.

In 2014, Hopeau was invited to participate in the Real Madrid Select camp, an invitation only soccer camp for the top 36 youth players around the world.

While playing for the Kapolei High School boys soccer team, Hopeau was named the 2015 and 2016 OIA West player of the year.

After being noticed as a standout with his Hawaii Rush club team, Hopeau joined the Sounders Academy in 2016 after the Sounders claimed the state of Hawaii as a homegrown territory, making him eligible to sign as a homegrown player. He ended up being the leading scorer on the Sounders academy team. Hopeau impressed enough at the academy level to earn two appearances, including one start, as an amateur with the Sounders FC second team in 2016.

=== Professional ===
Hopeau signed his first professional contract on March 22, 2017, joining Seattle Sounders FC 2 ahead of the 2017 USL season. Hopeau was the first Sounders Academy player from Hawaii to sign a professional contract with the team. Hopeau made his professional debut on March 26, 2017, starting in S2's season-opening 2–1 loss to Sacramento.

On June 30, 2020, Hopeau signed a Homegrown Players contract with the Seattle Sounders from the Tacoma Defiance where he had played in Tacoma's first two matches of the 2020 USL Championship season.

In April 2021, Hopeau joined San Antonio FC on loan ahead of the 2021 season.

Following the 2021 season, Seattle declined their contract option on Hopeau.

== Career statistics ==
Club	Season	League			Playoffs			Domestic Cup			Continental Cup			Total		
Club	Season	Apps	Goals	Assists	Apps	Goals	Assists	Apps	Goals	Assists	Apps	Goals	Assists	Apps	Goals	Assists
Seattle Sounders FC 2	2016	2	0	0	0	0	0	0	0	0	0	0	0	2	0	0
Seattle Sounders FC 2	2017	9	0	1	0	0	0	0	0	0	0	0	0	9	0	1
Seattle Sounders FC 2 total		11	0	1	0	0	0	0	0	0	0	0	0	11	0	1
Career total		11	0	1	0	0	0	0	0	0	0	0	0	11	0	1

Stats accurate as of June 1, 2017
