= Calle Brown =

American soccer player

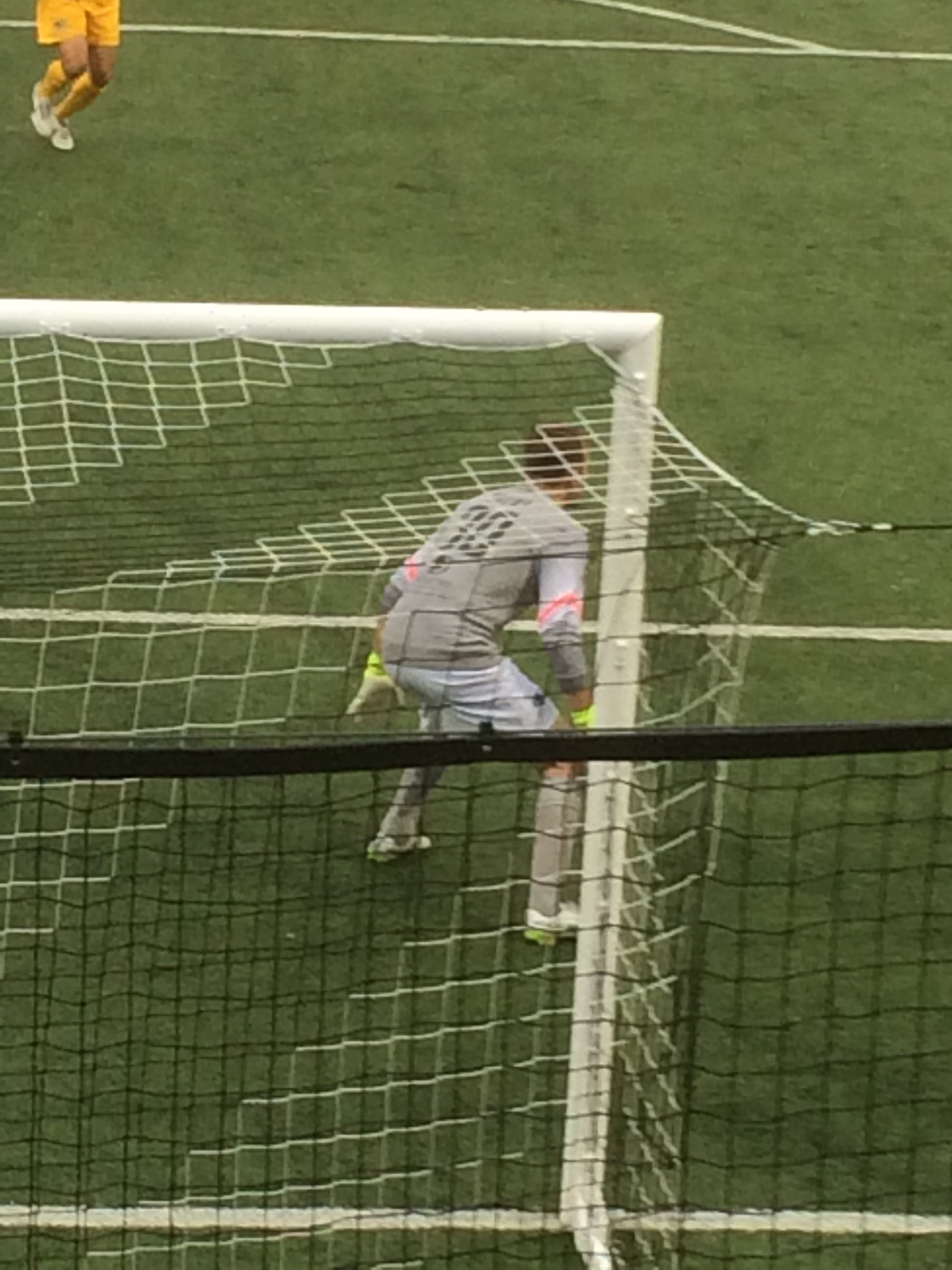
- Brown on Riverhounds debut

Personal information
- Date of birth: July 1, 1992 (age 34)
- Place of birth: Leesburg, Virginia, U.S.
- Height: 6 ft 4 in (1.93 m)
- Position: Goalkeeper

College career
Years	Team	Apps	(Gls)
2010–2014	Virginia Cavaliers		

Senior career*
Years	Team	Apps	(Gls)
2011	Northern Virginia Royals	7	(0)
2014	Northern Virginia Royals	5	(0)
2015	Pittsburgh Riverhounds	14	(0)
2016–2017	Houston Dynamo	0	(0)
2016–2017	→ Rio Grande Valley FC Toros (loan)	19	(0)
2018	Seattle Sounders FC	0	(0)
2018	→ Seattle Sounders FC 2 (loan)	21	(0)
2019	Loudoun United	15	(0)
2021–	Northern Virginia	?	
- * Club domestic league appearances and goals as of December 9, 2023

Calle Brown (born July 1, 1992) is an American soccer player who plays as a goalkeeper for Northern Virginia FC in USL League Two.

== Career ==
=== College and semi-professional ===
Brown played college soccer for the Virginia Cavaliers from 2010 to 2014. In 2013, he quit the team due to a lack of playing time after being beaten out for the starting role. However, he returned to the team and was named starter in 2014. In total, Brown made 30 appearances for the Cavaliers. In 2014, he led the team to the NCAA Division I national championship. He was named the tournament's most valuable defensive player after recording shutouts against the University of Maryland-Baltimore County in the semifinal and UCLA in the championship game. In 2011 and 2014, Brown also played for the Northern Virginia Royals of the semi-professional Premier Development League. He made seven appearances and five appearances for the club in 2011 and 2014, respectively.

=== Professional ===
On March 13, 2015, it was announced that Brown had signed for the Pittsburgh Riverhounds of the USL. Brown was seen as a potential starter for the club while Ryan Thompson, the club's regular starter, missed time while away on international duty with Jamaica. Brown made his professional debut on May 16, 2015, against the Richmond Kickers as Thompson was ruled out because of a back injury and was set to leave for international duty the following day. He made several stops in the eventual 1–1 draw with his only goal allowed coming off of a defensive error. Brown finished his first professional season with 14 league appearances for the Riverhounds and another in the club's 2015 Lamar Hunt U.S. Open Cup extra time- defeat to D.C. United. He was also the Riverhounds' goalkeeper in their first round exit of the 2015 USL playoffs as the club was defeated 2–4 in extra time.

In October 2015, Brown announced that he would be joining the Houston Dynamo of Major League Soccer for the 2016 season. The deal was officially announced by the club on December 17, 2015.

Following his release from Houston, Brown joined Seattle Sounders FC on February 20, 2018.

Brown signed with hometown club Loudoun United FC on February 12, 2019. He was released after the 2019 season.

In 2021, he returned to Northern Virginia FC after nearly two years without a club.

== Career statistics ==
As of November 5, 2017

Season	Club	League	Division	League		Cup (Note: Includes appearances in the U.S. Open Cup)		Continental		Total	
Season	Club	League	Division	Apps	Goals	Apps	Goals	Apps	Goals	Apps	Goals
2011	Northern Virginia Royals	PDL	IV	7	0	0	0	0	0	7	0
2014	Northern Virginia Royals	PDL	IV	5	0	0	0	0	0	5	0
2015	Pittsburgh Riverhounds	USL	III	15	0	1	0	0	0	16	0
2016	Rio Grande Valley FC Toros	USL	III	7	0	0	0	0	0	7	0
2017	Rio Grande Valley FC Toros	USL	II	12	0	0	0	0	0	12	0
Career total				46	0	1	0	0	0	47	0
