= Brian Nana-Sinkam =

American soccer player (born 1995)

Personal information
- Date of birth: January 1, 1995 (age 31)
- Place of birth: Lancaster, Pennsylvania, United States
- Height: 1.83 m (6 ft 0 in)
- Position: Defender

Youth career
- 2009–2013: PA Classics

College career
Years	Team	Apps	(Gls)
2013–2016	Stanford Cardinal	71	(1)

Senior career*
Years	Team	Apps	(Gls)
2015–2016	Burlingame Dragons	11	(1)
2017	Seattle Sounders FC 2	26	(3)
- * Club domestic league appearances and goals as of October 12, 2017

Brian Nana-Sinkam (born December 31, 1994) is an American soccer player who played for Seattle Sounders FC 2 in the USL.

== Career ==
Nana-Sinkam spent his youth career with PA Classics from 2009 to 2013 before signing a letter of intent to play college soccer at Stanford University. He made a total of 71 appearances for the Cardinal and finished his career with one goal and two assists.

He also played in the Premier Development League for Burlingame Dragons FC.

On January 13, 2017, Nana-Sinkam was drafted in the first round (22nd overall) of the 2017 MLS SuperDraft by Seattle Sounders FC. However, he did not make the final cut in preseason. He signed with USL affiliate club Seattle Sounders FC 2 on March 22. Four days later, he made his professional debut and scored in a 2–1 defeat to Sacramento Republic.
