= Seyi Adekoya =

American former soccer player

Personal information
- Full name: Adeseyi Shinobu Adeyinka Adekoya
- Date of birth: December 5, 1995 (age 30)
- Place of birth: Seattle, Washington, United States
- Height: 5 ft 11 in (1.80 m)
- Position: Forward

Youth career
- 2011–2013: Crossfire Premier
- 2013–2014: Seattle Sounders FC

College career
Years	Team	Apps	(Gls)
2014–2016	UCLA Bruins	55	(20)

Senior career*
Years	Team	Apps	(Gls)
2016	Golden State Force	5	(1)
2017–2018	Seattle Sounders FC	2	(0)
2017	→ Seattle Sounders FC 2 (loan)	13	(1)
2018–2020	Vendsyssel FF	22	(3)
2020	Balzan	4	(1)
2020–2021	Thisted	3	(1)
2021	Phoenix Rising	4	(0)
2021	→ OKC Energy (loan)	12	(1)
- * Club domestic league appearances and goals as of November 5, 2021

Adeseyi "Seyi" Shinobu Adeyinka Adekoya (/ˈʃeɪ ˌædəˈkɔɪ.ə/ SHAY-yee AD-e-KOY-a; born December 5, 1995) is an American former soccer player who played as a forward.

== Career ==
=== Youth, college and amateur ===
A product of Lakeside School (Seattle), Adekoya spent his youth career with Crossfire Premier from 2011 to 2013 and with the Seattle Sounders FC academy from 2013 to 2014 before signing a letter of intent to play college soccer at UCLA. He made a total of 55 appearances for the Bruins and finished with 20 goals and eight assists.

He also played in the Premier Development League for FC Golden State Force.

=== Professional ===
On January 17, 2017, Adekoya signed a homegrown player contract with Seattle Sounders FC, making him the ninth homegrown signing in club history. On March 26, 2017, he made his professional debut for USL affiliate club Seattle Sounders FC 2 in a 2–1 loss to Sacramento Republic. Adekoya scored his first professional goal on April 2, 2017, playing for Sounders FC 2 in a 2–1 win over Timbers 2. Adekoya made his first start for Seattle Sounders FC on May 31, 2017, in a 3–0 defeat to the Columbus Crew. His release from the team was announced on April 3, 2018.

In June 2018, Adekoya moved to Danish Superliga side Vendsyssel FF. In January 2020, Adekoya moved to Maltese Premier League side Balzan. He returned to Denmark in October 2020, signing a contract until December 2020 for third-tier Danish 2nd Division club Thisted FC. On April 1, 2021, Adekoya joined USL Championship club Phoenix Rising FC. On August 6, 2021, Adekoya moved on loan to USL Championship side OKC Energy for the remainder of the season.
