= David Olsen (soccer) =

American soccer player

Personal information
- Full name: David Quinn Olsen
- Date of birth: February 5, 1996 (age 30)
- Place of birth: Seattle, Washington, U.S.
- Height: 1.83 m (6 ft 0 in)
- Position: Forward

Youth career
- 2006–2011: Crossfire Premier
- 2011–2014: Seattle Sounders FC

College career
Years	Team	Apps	(Gls)
2014	San Diego State Aztecs	19	(7)
2015–2016	Seattle Redhawks	38	(20)

Senior career*
Years	Team	Apps	(Gls)
2015–2016	Seattle Sounders FC U-23	17	(4)
2017–2018	Seattle Sounders FC 2	47	(5)
2022–2023	Richmond Kickers	16	(0)
- * Club domestic league appearances and goals as of October 18, 2023

David Quinn Olsen (born February 5, 1996) is an American soccer player who is currently a free agent.

== Career ==
=== Youth, college and amateur ===
Olsen spent with youth career with the Crossfire Premier Academy and the Seattle Sounders FC Academy before signing a letter of intent to play college soccer at San Diego State University. In 2014, he made 19 appearances for the Aztecs and tallied seven goals and 1 assists.

On March 30, 2015, it was announced that Olsen had decided to transfer to Seattle University. He made a total of 30 appearances for the Redhawks and tallied 20 goals and five assists.

He also played in the Premier Development League for Seattle Sounders FC U-23.

=== Professional ===
On March 24, 2017, Olsen signed a professional contract with USL club Seattle Sounders FC 2. He made his professional debut two days later in a 2–1 defeat to Sacramento Republic.

Following a break from the professional game due to injury, Olsen returned to playing with USL League One club Richmond Kickers announcing he'd joined ahead of their 2022 season. His contract was renewed for the 2023 season, but was released at the end of 2023 season.
