= Zach Mathers =

American soccer player (born 1994)

Personal information
- Full name: Zachary Robert Mathers
- Date of birth: April 14, 1994 (age 32)
- Place of birth: Fort Worth, Texas, United States
- Height: 1.80 m (5 ft 11 in)
- Position: Midfielder

Youth career
- 2009–2012: Solar Chelsea FC

College career
Years	Team	Apps	(Gls)
2012–2015	Duke Blue Devils	71	(14)

Senior career*
Years	Team	Apps	(Gls)
2013	Orange County Blues U-23		
2016	Seattle Sounders FC 2	24	(3)
2017–2018	Seattle Sounders FC	0	(0)
2017	→ Seattle Sounders FC 2 (loan)	24	(11)
2018	Las Vegas Lights	5	(1)
- * Club domestic league appearances and goals as of 17:17, 4 July 2018 (UTC)

Zachary Robert Mathers (born April 14, 1994) is an American soccer player.

== Career ==
=== College ===
Mathers spent his entire college career at Duke University. He made a total of 71 appearances for the Blue Devils and tallied 14 goals and 18 assists.

=== Professional ===
On January 14, 2016, Mathers was selected in the second round (35th overall) of the 2016 MLS SuperDraft by Seattle Sounders FC. However, he was cut during preseason and on March 9, he signed a professional contract with USL affiliate club Seattle Sounders FC 2. He made his professional debut on March 25 in a 1–0 defeat against Sacramento Republic. He played his first game for Seattle Sounders FC in the US Open Cup in a 2–0 win against the Kitsap Pumas on June 15, 2016. On March 2, 2018, Mathers was waived by Seattle Sounders FC.
