= 2015 Seattle Sounders FC 2 season =

Seattle Sounders FC 2
2015 season
- General manager: Andrew Opatkiewicz
- Head coach: Ezra Hendrickson
- Stadium: Starfire Sports Complex
- USL: Conference: 6th
- USL Playoffs: First round
- U.S. Open Cup: Fourth round
- Top goalscorer: League: Pablo Rossi (6); All: Pablo Rossi (9)
- Highest home attendance: 2,951 (Mar 21 vs. Sacramento)
- Lowest home attendance: League: 1,789 (June 25 vs. Real Monarchs); All: 1,737 (May 27 vs. Portland 2)
- Average home league attendance: League: 2,210; All: 2,126
Home colors	Away colors	Third colors

The 2015 Seattle Sounders FC 2 season was the club's first year of existence, and their first season in the United Soccer League, the third tier of the United States soccer pyramid. Including previous Seattle Sounders franchises, it was the 35th season of a soccer team playing in the Seattle metro area.

== Roster ==
Note: Flags indicate national team as defined under FIFA eligibility rules; some limited exceptions apply. Players may hold more than one non-FIFA nationality. Squad correct as of May 27, 2015.

No.	Pos.	Nation	Player
7	MF	USA	Cristian Roldan
11	MF	USA	Aaron Kovar
13	MF	COL	Andrés Correa
15	DF	USA	Dylan Remick
17	FW	USA	Darwin Jones
21	DF	USA	Jimmy Ockford
22	GK	USA	Charlie Lyon
25	DF	USA	Aaron Long
30	MF	GAM	Amadou Sanyang (Captain)
31	DF	JAM	Damion Lowe
32	MF	USA	Duncan McCormick
39	FW	VIN	Oalex Anderson
44	DF	USA	Nick Miele
45	MF	CAN	Giuliano Frano
47	GK	USA	R. J. Noll
49	GK	USA	Saif Kerawala
50	FW	SLE	Nate Tongovula
51	DF	USA	Kasey French
52	MF	USA	Lorenzo Ramos
53	DF	USA	Tosh Samkange
54	MF	USA	Diego Silvas
55	MF	ARG	Pablo Rossi
66	FW	NGA	Qudus Lawal
80	MF	USA	Victor Mansaray
88	FW	USA	Sam Garza
89	MF	BRA	Sérgio
91	DF	JAM	Oniel Fisher
99	FW	USA	Andy Craven

== Competitions ==
=== USL regular season ===
==== Standings ====
Pos	Team	Pld	W	D	L	GF	GA	GD	Pts	Qualification
4	Sacramento Republic	28	13	7	8	43	31	+12	46	First round
5	LA Galaxy II	28	14	3	11	39	31	+8	45	First round
6	Seattle Sounders 2	28	13	3	12	45	42	+3	42	First round
7	Tulsa Roughnecks	28	11	6	11	49	46	+3	39	
8	Portland Timbers 2	28	11	2	15	38	45	−7	35	

Source: 2015 USL schedule
Rules for classification: 1) head-to-head; 2) total wins; 3) total goal differential; 4) total goals scored; 5) disciplinary points; 6) away goals scored; 7) away goal differential; 8) home goals scored; 9) home goal differential; 10) coin toss or drawing of lots

==== Results summary ====
Overall								Home						Away					
Pld	W	D	L	GF	GA	GD	Pts	W	D	L	GF	GA	GD	W	D	L	GF	GA	GD
28	13	3	12	45	42	+3	42	11	0	3	30	18	+12	2	3	9	15	24	−9

Last updated: September 23, 2015.
Source: USL

==== Results by matchday ====
Matchday	1	2	3	4	5	6	7	8	9	10	11	12	13	14	15	16	17	18	19	20	21	22	23	24	25	26	27	28
Stadium	H	H	H	A	A	A	H	A	H	A	A	H	H	A	H	A	A	H	A	H	A	H	H	A	A	A	H	H
Result	W	W	W	L	L	D	W	L	W	W	D	L	W	L	W	W	L	W	D	W	L	L	W	L	L	L	L	W
Position	1	1	1	1	3	3	1	3	1	1	1	1	1	5	4	2	2	2	2	2	1	3	3	4	5	7	7	6

Updated to match(es) played on September 12, 2015. Source: USL
A = Away; H = Home; W = Win; D = Draw; L = Loss

==== Matches ====
March 21, 2015 USL 1	Seattle Sounders FC 2	4–2	Sacramento Republic FC	Tukwila, Washington
19:30 (PDT)	Craven 49'; Garza 70'; Rossi 76'; Roldan 89'	Report	Braun (yellow card) 59', (goal) 64'; Foran (yellow card) 65'; Kiffe (yellow card) 75'; Guzman 90+'	Stadium: Starfire Sports Complex; Attendance: 2,951; Referee: Baboucarr Jallow

March 29, 2015 USL 2	Seattle Sounders FC 2	4–0	Whitecaps FC 2	Tukwila, Washington
16:00 (PDT)	Jones 17', 37', 50'; Craven 26'; Correa (yellow card) 76'	Report	Parker (yellow card) 29'; McKendry (yellow card) 53'	Stadium: Starfire Sports Complex; Attendance: 2,407; Referee: Josh Wilkens

April 11, 2015 USL 3	Seattle Sounders FC 2	2–1	Portland Timbers 2	Tukwila, Washington
19:30 (PDT)	Rossi 47' (pen.); Frano 88', (yellow card) 74'	Report	Delbridge 30'; Payne (yellow card) 51'; Winchester (yellow card) 90'	Stadium: Starfire Sports Complex; Attendance: 2,304; Referee: Chipalo Street

April 16, 2015 USL 4	Tulsa Roughnecks	4–3	Seattle Sounders FC 2	Tulsa, Oklahoma
17:00 (PDT)	Bardsley 2'; Galbraith-Knapp 20'; Davoren (yellow card) 22'; Ochoa (yellow card) 39'; Miller 69'; Cordeiro 78'; Lorei (yellow card) 87'; Bell (yellow card) 89'	Report	Lawal 9', 10'; Ockford 25'; Frano (yellow card) 62'; Fisher (yellow card) 77'	Stadium: ONEOK Field; Attendance: 4,025; Referee: Nima Saghafi

April 18, 2015 USL 5	Oklahoma City Energy FC	2–1	Seattle Sounders FC 2	Oklahoma City, Oklahoma
17:00 (PDT)	Sanchez 38'; König 86'	Report	Jones 33'; Sanyang (yellow card) 45'	Stadium: Taft Stadium; Attendance: 6,800; Referee: Leszek Stalmach

April 26, 2015 USL 6	Whitecaps FC 2	1–1	Seattle Sounders FC 2	Vancouver, British Columbia
15:00 (PDT)	Earnshaw 16', (yellow card) 28'	Report	Miele 24'; Kovar (yellow card) 28'; Lowe (yellow card) 84'	Stadium: Thunderbird Stadium; Attendance: 2,056; Referee: Juan Marquez

May 1, 2015 USL 7	Seattle Sounders FC 2	2–1	Orange County Blues FC	Tukwila, Washington
19:30 (PDT)	Garza 66'; Rossi 84' (pen.)	Report	Slager 32'; Filipovic (yellow card) 68'	Stadium: Starfire Sports Complex; Attendance: 2,043; Referee: Ekaterina Koroleva

May 9, 2015 USL 8	Sacramento Republic	3–0	Seattle Sounders FC 2	Sacramento, California
20:00 (PDT)	Vukovic 19'; Daly (yellow card) 27'; López 62'; Gabelgic 78'	Report	Frano (yellow card) 27' (yellow-red card) 65'; Lowe (yellow card) 33'; McCormick (yellow card) 58'	Stadium: Bonney Field; Attendance: 11,242; Referee: Victor Rivas

May 15, 2015 USL 9	Seattle Sounders FC 2	3–1	Oklahoma City Energy FC	Tukwila, Washington
19:30 (PDT)	Lim (yellow card) 5'; Mansaray (yellow card) 36'; Craven 56', 80'; Anderson 79'	Report	Townsend (yellow card) 35'; Dalgaard 49'; König (yellow card) 83'	Stadium: Starfire Sports Complex; Attendance: 2,118; Referee: Younes Marrakchi

May 22, 2015 USL 10	Portland Timbers 2	0–2	Seattle Sounders FC 2	Portland, Oregon
19:00 (PDT)	Payne (yellow card) 28'; Casiple (yellow card) 30'; Belmar (yellow card) 38'; Delbridge (red card) 90'	Report	Lowe 38'; Craven 55'; Kovar (yellow card) 90'	Stadium: Merlo Field; Attendance: 3,095; Referee: Juan Colazo

May 30, 2015 USL 11	Orange County Blues FC	1–1	Seattle Sounders FC 2	Irvine, California
19:00 (PDT)	Crettenand 70'; Suggs (red card) 76'	Report	Jones 31'; Frano (yellow card) 71'; Fisher (yellow card) 72'; Garza (yellow card) 90'	Stadium: Anteater Stadium; Attendance: 1,052; Referee: Ramon Hernandez

June 5, 2015 USL 12	Seattle Sounders FC 2	1–5	Tulsa Roughnecks	Tukwila, Washington
19:30 (PDT)	Rossi 23'	Report	Black 10', 34'; Lucas 40'; Nwabueze 78'; Ochoa 88'	Stadium: Starfire Sports Complex; Attendance: 2,166; Referee: Chipalo Street

June 11, 2015 USL 13	Seattle Sounders FC 2	1–0	LA Galaxy II	Tukwila, Washington
19:30 (PDT)	Correa (yellow card) 8'; Kovar 73'; Mota (yellow card) 89'	Report	Diallo (yellow card) 28'; Bowen (yellow card) 49'; McBean (yellow card) 81'; Fuji (yellow card) 90'	Stadium: Starfire Sports Complex; Attendance: 2,059; Referee: Levi Rippy

June 20, 2015 USL 14	Arizona United SC	2–1	Seattle Sounders FC 2	Scottsdale, Arizona
18:30 (PDT)	Top 60'; Tan 63'; Morrison (yellow card) 81'	Report	Miele 19'; McCormick (yellow card) 33' (red card) 59'; Garza (yellow card) 54'; Frano (yellow card) 66'; Sanyang (yellow card) 89'; Craven (yellow card) 90+'	Stadium: Scottsdale Stadium; Attendance: 3,144; Referee: Andrew Musashe

June 25, 2015 USL 15	Seattle Sounders FC 2	1–0	Real Monarchs	Tukwila, Washington
19:30 (PDT)	Sanyang (yellow card) 42'; Rossi 57'	Report	Welshman (yellow card) 38'	Stadium: Starfire Sports Complex; Attendance: 1,789; Referee: Marco Vega

June 29, 2015 USL 16	Portland Timbers 2	0–2	Seattle Sounders FC 2	Portland, Oregon
19:00 (PDT)		Report	Garza 45+'; Rossi 86'	Stadium: Merlo Field; Attendance: 2,932; Referee: Josh Wilkens

July 4, 2015 USL 17	Whitecaps FC 2	3–1	Seattle Sounders FC 2	Vancouver, British Columbia
15:00 (PDT)	Dean 41'; Blasco 89', 90'	Report	Garza (yellow card) 32'; Lowe (yellow card) 63'; Mota 67'	Stadium: Thunderbird Stadium; Attendance: 1,409; Referee: Juan Marquez

July 12, 2015 USL 18	Seattle Sounders FC 2	4–0	Arizona United SC	Tukwila, Washington
17:30 (PDT)	Anderson 2', 14'; Long 37'; Rossi 58', (yellow card) 68'	Report	Dillon (yellow card) 33'; Granger (yellow card) 36'	Stadium: Starfire Sports Complex; Attendance: 2,051; Referee: Farhad Dadkho

July 18, 2015 USL 19	Colorado Springs Switchbacks FC	1–1	Seattle Sounders FC 2	Colorado Springs, Colorado
18:00 (PDT)	King 8'; Harada (yellow card) 37'; Bejarano (yellow card) 50'; Argueta (yellow card) 89'	Report	Lowe (yellow card) 44'; Mota 60' (yellow card) 87'	Stadium: Sand Creek Stadium; Attendance: 3,563; Referee: Mark Sauro

July 24, 2015 USL 20	Seattle Sounders FC 2	2–0	Portland Timbers 2	Tukwila, Washington
19:30 (PDT)	Frano 25'; McCormick (yellow card) 26'; Anderson 31'; Parsemain (yellow card) 54'; Sanyang (yellow card) 63'; Long (yellow card) 65'; Garza (yellow card) 76'	Report	Delbridge (yellow card) 24'; Winchester (yellow card) 72'; Fatawu Safiu (yellow card) 88'	Stadium: Starfire Sports Complex; Attendance: 2,469; Referee: Levi Rippy

August 1, 2015 USL 21	Sacramento Republic	2–0	Seattle Sounders FC 2	Sacramento, California
20:00 (PDT)	Stewart 36', 83'	Report	Sanyang (red card) 76'; Rossi (yellow card) 87'	Stadium: Bonney Field; Referee: Vincent Apple-Chiarella

August 8, 2015 USL 22	Seattle Sounders FC 2	0–3	Whitecaps FC 2	Tukwila, Washington
19:30 (PDT)	Sérgio Mota (yellow card) 31'	Report	Bustos 47' 56'; Nitti (yellow card) 61'; Lewis 77'; Seymore (yellow card) 86'; Richey (yellow card) 90'	Stadium: Starfire Sports Complex; Attendance: 2,247; Referee: Jeff Arthurholtz

August 19, 2015 USL 23	Seattle Sounders FC 2	3–2	Colorado Springs Switchbacks FC	Tukwila, Washington
19:30 (PDT)	Samuel 51' 86'; Lowe (yellow card) 63'; Mota 78'	Report	Gonzalez 18'; Stan Schrock (yellow card) 53'; King 90'	Stadium: Starfire Sports Complex; Attendance: 2,021; Referee: Josh Wilkens

August 23, 2015 USL 24	LA Galaxy II	1–0	Seattle Sounders FC 2	Carson, California
18:00	McBean 44'; Olivera (yellow card) 52'	Report	Frano (red card) 62'; Fairclough (yellow card) 79'	Stadium: StubHub Center; Attendance: 1,056; Referee: Victor Rivas

August 28, 2015 USL 25	Real Monarchs SLC	2–1	Seattle Sounders FC 2	Sandy, Utah
18:00 (PDT)	Velazco 22'; Fairclough (yellow card) 41'; Tavares 45'	Report	Rossi 72'	Stadium: Rio Tinto Stadium; Attendance: 13,979; Referee: Adam Zarrin

September 5, 2015 USL 26	Austin Aztex	2–1	Seattle Sounders FC 2	Austin, Texas
19:30 (PDT)	Cuero 14'; Gall 34'; Caesar (yellow card) 65'; Rocha (yellow card) 66'	Report	Correa (yellow card) 20'; Garza 43' (yellow card) 45'; Sanyang (yellow card) 45'; Lowe (yellow card) 65'	Stadium: House Park; Attendance: 5,055; Referee: Mike Arrington

September 11, 2015 USL 27	Seattle Sounders FC 2	0–1	Orange County Blues FC	Tukwila, Washington
19:30 (PDT)	Frano (yellow card) 69'	Report	Suggs (yellow card) 34'; Blanco (yellow card) 45'; Cortez 57'	Stadium: Starfire Sports Complex; Attendance: 2,268; Referee: Michael Lavergne

September 17, 2015 USL 28	Seattle Sounders FC 2	3–2	Austin Aztex	Tukwila, Washington
19:30 (PDT)	Sérgio 9'; Fairclough 45+1'; Azira (yellow card) 55'; Miele 84'	Report	Caeser 12'; Gall 38'; Rocha (yellow card) 57'	Stadium: Starfire Sports Complex; Attendance: 2,207; Referee: Jeff Arthurholtz

=== USL Playoffs ===
September 25, 2015 First round	Colorado Springs Switchbacks FC	2–0	Seattle Sounders FC 2	Colorado Springs, Colorado
19:00 (MDT)	Gonzalez 14'; Greer 22'; Burt (yellow card) 78'; Gorrick (yellow card) 88'; Phillips (yellow card) 90+'	Report	Fairclough (yellow card) 5'; Lowe (yellow card) 49'	Stadium: Sand Creek Stadium; Attendance: 2,532; Referee: Rosendo Mendoza

=== U.S. Open Cup ===
May 20, 2015 Second Round	Seattle Sounders FC 2 (Washington (state))	4–2 (a.e.t.)	(Washington (state)) Kitsap Pumas	Tukwila, Washington
19:30 (PDT)	Mansaray 26'; Rossi 45', 93'; Garza (yellow card) 79'; Frano (yellow card) 98'; Craven 120+6'	Report	Ramos 66', 90'; Jammeh (yellow card) 67'; Jansen (yellow card) 81'; DeZorzi (yellow card) 92' (yellow-red card) 102'	Stadium: Starfire Sports Complex; Attendance: 1,766; Referee: Ekatarina Koroleva

May 27, 2015 Third Round	Seattle Sounders FC 2 (Washington (state))	2–1 (a.e.t.)	(Oregon) Portland Timbers 2	Tukwila, Washington
13:00 (PDT)	Craven (yellow card) 62', (goal) 66'; Garza (yellow card) 94'; Rossi 104'	Report	Clark 54'; O'Rourke (yellow card) 74'; Besler (yellow card) 86'; Clarke (yellow card) 90'; Rose (yellow card) 107'	Stadium: Starfire Sports Complex; Attendance: 1,737; Referee: Farhad Dadkho

June 16, 2015 Fourth Round	Real Salt Lake (Utah)	2–1	(Washington (state)) Seattle Sounders FC 2	Sandy, Utah
19:00 (PDT)	Stertzer (yellow card) 52'; Plata 63'; Morales 71'	Seattle Report; MLS Report	Garza 45+4'; Mansaray (yellow card) 70'; Sanyang (yellow card) 89' (yellow-red card) 90+3'; Mota (yellow card) 90+3'	Stadium: Rio Tinto Stadium; Attendance: 8,208; Referee: Bernhard Hosu

== Recognition ==
USL Player of the Week

Week	Player	Opponent	Link
1	(Argentina) Pablo Rossi	Sacramento Republic	
2	(United States) Darwin Jones	Whitecaps FC 2	

USL Team of the Week

Week	Players	Opponent	Link
1	(United States) Andy Craven	Sacramento Republic	
1	(Canada) Giuliano Frano	Sacramento Republic	
1	(Argentina) Pablo Rossi	Sacramento Republic	
2	(United States) Darwin Jones	Whitecaps FC 2	
4	(Canada) Giuliano Frano	Portland Timbers 2	
6	(United States) Nick Miele	Whitecaps FC 2	
9	(United States) Andy Craven	Oklahoma City Energy FC	
10	(Jamaica) Damion Lowe	Portland Timbers 2	
11	(United States) Nick Miele	Orange County Blues FC	
