= 2016 Seattle Sounders FC season =

American soccer team season

Seattle Sounders FC
2016 season
- General manager: Garth Lagerwey
- Head coach: Sigi Schmid (until July 26); Brian Schmetzer (after July 26, interim)
- Stadium: CenturyLink Field
- Major League Soccer: Conference: 4th Overall: 7th
- MLS Cup playoffs: Winners
- U.S. Open Cup: Quarterfinals
- CONCACAF Champions League (15–16): Quarterfinals
- Top goalscorer: League: Jordan Morris (12); All: Jordan Morris (14)
- Highest home attendance: 53,302 (Aug. 21 vs. Portland)
- Lowest home attendance: League: 39,269 (Sept. 28 vs. Chicago); All: 36,151 (Oct. 27 vs. Kansas City, Playoffs)
- Average home league attendance: League: 42,636; All: 42,040
- Biggest win: League: 5–0 vs. Dallas (Jul. 13)
- Biggest defeat: League: 0–3 at Kansas City (Jul. 24)
Home colors	Away colors	Third colors

The 2016 season was the eighth season for Seattle Sounders FC in Major League Soccer (MLS), the top flight of professional club soccer in the United States. The team were managed by Sigi Schmid until his firing in late July; he was replaced by Brian Schmetzer on an interim basis. The Sounders won their first MLS Cup in the 2016 final against Toronto FC, which ended in a penalty shootout after a scoreless draw.

== Roster ==
Note: Flags indicate national team as defined under FIFA eligibility rules; some limited exceptions apply. Players may hold more than one non-FIFA nationality. Squad correct as of July 28, 2016.

No.	Pos.	Nation	Player
1	GK	USA	Tyler Miller
2	FW	USA	Clint Dempsey (DP)
3	DF	USA	Brad Evans
4	DF	ENG	Tyrone Mears
6	MF	CUB	Osvaldo Alonso
7	MF	USA	Cristian Roldan (GA)
8	MF	SWE	Erik Friberg
9	FW	USA	Herculez Gomez
10	MF	URU	Nicolás Lodeiro (DP)
11	MF	USA	Aaron Kovar (HGP)
12	MF	USA	Michael Farfan
13	FW	USA	Jordan Morris (HGP)
14	DF	USA	Chad Marshall
15	DF	USA	Dylan Remick
16	FW	PAR	Nelson Valdez (DP)
17	FW	USA	Darwin Jones (HGP)
18	MF	USA	Nathan Sturgis
20	DF	USA	Zach Scott
21	MF	URU	Álvaro Fernández
22	GK	USA	Charlie Lyon
23	MF	AUT	Andreas Ivanschitz
24	GK	SUI	Stefan Frei
25	DF	MEX	Tony Alfaro
29	DF	PAN	Román Torres
33	DF	TRI	Joevin Jones
39	FW	VIN	Oalex Anderson
80	FW	USA	Victor Mansaray (HGP)
91	DF	JAM	Oniel Fisher

== Competitions ==
=== Preseason ===
Win Draw Loss Upcoming fixture

==== Scrimmages ====
February 3, 2016	FC Tucson	0–1	Seattle Sounders FC	Tucson, Arizona, U.S.
19:00 (PST)		Report	Kovar 34'	Stadium: Kino North Stadium

February 14, 2016	UCLA Bruins	1–5	Seattle Sounders FC	Los Angeles, California, U.S.
13:00 (PST)	Adekoya	Report	Morris; Jones; Ivanschitz; Kovar	Stadium: Drake Stadium

February 17, 2016	Seongnam FC	1–2	Seattle Sounders FC	Los Angeles, California, U.S.
	Goal	Report	Mathers; Jones 27'

February 17, 2016	LA Galaxy	0–4	Seattle Sounders FC	Carson, California, U.S.
19:00 (PST)	Cole (yellow card) 58'; Rogers (yellow card) 60'	Report	Ivanschitz 23', 57'; Marshall 26'; Dempsey 47' (yellow card) 70'	Stadium: StubHub Center

==== Desert Friendlies ====
February 3, 2016	Vancouver Whitecaps FC	2–1	Seattle Sounders FC	Tucson, Arizona, U.S.
16:00 (PST)	Aird (yellow card) 30'; Mattocks 51', 90'	Report	Jones 76'; Lowe (yellow card) 84'	Stadium: Kino Grandstand Field; Attendance: 760

February 6, 2016	Portland Timbers	2–1	Seattle Sounders FC	Tucson, Arizona, U.S.
18:00 (PST)	Peay (yellow card) 52'; McInerney 66', 84'	Report	Jones 53'	Stadium: Kino North Stadium; Attendance: 3,112

February 9, 2016	Celaya F.C.	2–1	Seattle Sounders FC	Tucson, Arizona, U.S.
18:00 (PST)	Gordillo 3'; Mañón 16'; Restrepo (yellow card) 66'	Report	Valdez 54'; Mathers (yellow card) 83'	Stadium: Kino North Stadium; Attendance: 1,316

=== Major League Soccer ===
==== League tables ====
===== Western Conference =====
Pos	Team	Pld	W	L	T	GF	GA	GD	Pts	Qualification
2	Colorado Rapids	34	15	6	13	39	32	+7	58	MLS Cup Conference Semifinals
3	LA Galaxy	34	12	6	16	54	39	+15	52	MLS Cup Knockout Round
4	Seattle Sounders FC	34	14	14	6	44	43	+1	48	MLS Cup Knockout Round
5	Sporting Kansas City	34	13	13	8	42	41	+1	47	MLS Cup Knockout Round
6	Real Salt Lake	34	12	12	10	44	46	−2	46	MLS Cup Knockout Round

Source: MLS

===== Overall =====
Pos	Team	Pld	W	L	T	GF	GA	GD	Pts	Qualification
5	Toronto FC	34	14	9	11	51	39	+12	53	CONCACAF Champions League
6	LA Galaxy	34	12	6	16	54	39	+15	52	
7	Seattle Sounders FC (C)	34	14	14	6	44	43	+1	48	CONCACAF Champions League
8	Sporting Kansas City	34	13	13	8	42	41	+1	47	
9	Real Salt Lake	34	12	12	10	44	46	−2	46	

Source: MLS
Rules for classification: 1) points; 2) total wins; 3) total goal differential; 4) total goals scored;
(C) MLS Cup Champion

==== Results summary ====
Overall								Home						Away					
Pld	W	D	L	GF	GA	GD	Pts	W	D	L	GF	GA	GD	W	D	L	GF	GA	GD
34	14	6	14	44	43	+1	48	10	2	5	22	12	+10	4	4	9	22	31	−9

Last updated: October 23, 2016.
Source: MLS

==== Results by matchday ====
Matchday	1	2	3	4	5	6	7	8	9	10	11	12	13	14	15	16	17	18	19	20	21	22	23	24	25	26	27	28	29	30	31	32	33	34
Stadium	H	A	H	H	A	H	A	H	H	A	H	A	A	A	H	A	H	H	A	A	H	A	H	H	A	A	A	H	A	H	A	H	A	H
Result	L	L	L	W	D	W	L	W	W	L	L	L	W	L	L	D	L	W	L	L	D	W	W	W	D	L	D	W	W	W	W	D	L	W

Updated to match(es) played on October 23, 2016. Source: MLS
A = Away; H = Home; W = Win; D = Draw; L = Loss

==== Matches ====
March 6, 2016 MLS 1	Seattle Sounders FC	0–1	Sporting Kansas City	Seattle, Washington
16:00 (PDT)	Fisher (red card) 41'	Report; Boxscore	Coelho 73'; Zusi (yellow card) 76'; Espinoza (yellow card) 77'	Stadium: CenturyLink Field; Attendance: 39,525; Referee: Alan Kelly

March 12, 2016 MLS 2	Real Salt Lake	2–1	Seattle Sounders FC	Sandy, Utah
13:00 (PDT)	Sunny 43'; Beckerman (yellow card) 73'; Olave 86'	Report; Boxscore	Friberg (yellow card) 13'; Alonso 28'; Scott (yellow card) 35'; Jones (yellow card) 38'; Dempsey (yellow card) 88'	Stadium: Rio Tinto Stadium; Attendance: 19,282; Referee: Juan Guzman

March 19, 2016 MLS 3 Cascadia Cup	Seattle Sounders FC	1–2	Vancouver Whitecaps FC	Seattle, Washington
19:00 (PDT)	Ivanschitz (yellow card) 44' (goal) 52'; Mears (yellow card) 71'; Marshall (yellow card) 73'	Report; Boxscore	Morales 10' (pen.) (yellow card) 51' (goal) 74' (pen.); Rivero (yellow card) 35'; Pérez (yellow card) 82'	Stadium: CenturyLink Field; Attendance: 40,012; Referee: Mark Geiger

April 2, 2016 MLS 4	Seattle Sounders FC	1–0	Montreal Impact	Seattle, Washington
19:00 (PDT)	Ivanschitz (yellow card) 67'; Dempsey 79'	Report; Boxscore	Camara (yellow card) 64'; Ontivero (yellow card) 75'; Toia (yellow card) 78'	Stadium: CenturyLink Field; Attendance: 39,705; Referee: Baldomero Toledo

April 10, 2016 MLS 5	Houston Dynamo	1–1	Seattle Sounders FC	Houston, Texas
13:00 (PDT)	Barnes 35'; Anibaba (yellow card) 41'	Report; Boxscore	Jones (yellow card) 55'; Marshall 90+4'	Stadium: BBVA Compass Stadium; Attendance: 20,975; Referee: Ismail Elfath

April 16, 2016 MLS 6	Seattle Sounders FC	2–1	Philadelphia Union	Seattle, Washington
19:00 (PDT)	Marshall 41'; Remick (yellow card) 55'; Morris 71'; Valdez (yellow card) 88'; Alonso (yellow card) 90+5'	Report; Boxscore	Alberg (red card) 32' 53'; Fabinho (yellow card) 34'; Le Toux 73'; Fernandes (yellow card) 87'	Stadium: CenturyLink Field; Attendance: 39,620; Referee: Drew Fischer

April 23, 2016 MLS 7	Colorado Rapids	3–1	Seattle Sounders FC	Commerce City, Colorado
18:00 (PDT)	Badji (yellow card) 1'; Williams (yellow card) 14'; Jones 20' (yellow card) 20'; Miller (yellow card) 47'; Solignac 51'; Doyle 86'	Report; Boxscore	Morris 63'; Evans (red card) 86' 86'	Stadium: Dick's Sporting Goods Park; Attendance: 17,294; Referee: Jorge Gonzalez

April 30, 2016 MLS 8	Seattle Sounders FC	1–0	Columbus Crew	Seattle, Washington
13:00 (PDT)	Alonso (yellow card) 27'; Friberg (yellow card) 82'; Morris 88'	Report; Boxscore	Francis (yellow card) 86'; Finlay (yellow card) 87'	Stadium: CenturyLink Field; Attendance: 39,473; Referee: Juan Guzman

May 7, 2016 MLS 9 Heritage Cup	Seattle Sounders FC	2–0	San Jose Earthquakes	Seattle, Washington
19:00 (PDT)	Dempsey 26'; Alonso (yellow card) 43'; Morris 89'	Report; Boxscore		Stadium: CenturyLink Field; Attendance: 39,570; Referee: Alan Kelly

May 14, 2016 MLS 10	FC Dallas	2–0	Seattle Sounders FC	Frisco, Texas
18:00 (PDT)	Díaz 3' (pen.); Barrios 80'	Report; Boxscore		Stadium: Toyota Stadium; Attendance: 14,630; Referee: Ricardo Salazar

May 21, 2016 MLS 11	Seattle Sounders FC	0–1	Colorado Rapids	Seattle, Washington
19:00 (PDT)		Report; Boxscore	Sjöberg 43'; Jones (yellow card) 44'; Burch (yellow card) 60'; Williams (yellow card) 79'	Stadium: CenturyLink Field; Attendance: 41,028; Referee: Ismail Elfath

May 28, 2016 MLS 12	New England Revolution	2–1	Seattle Sounders FC	Foxborough, Massachusetts
16:30 (PDT)	Nguyen 24' (pen.); Fagúndez (yellow card) 35'; Femi 80'	Report; Boxscore	Kovar 7'	Stadium: Gillette Stadium; Attendance: 21,456; Referee: Fotis Bazakos

June 1, 2016 MLS 13	D.C. United	0–2	Seattle Sounders FC	Washington, D.C.
17:00 (PDT)	Espíndola (yellow card) 73'	Report; Boxscore	Ivanschitz (yellow card) 38'; Kovar (yellow card) 64'; Morris 79'; Jones 83'	Stadium: RFK Stadium; Attendance: 15,174; Referee: Jose Carlos Rivero

June 19, 2016 MLS 14	New York Red Bulls	2–0	Seattle Sounders FC	Harrison, New Jersey
16:30 (PDT)	Felipe (yellow card) 4'; Wright-Phillips (yellow card) 7'; Grella 18', 59'; Lade (yellow card) 79'; Collin (yellow card) 82'	Report; Boxscore	Alonso (yellow card) 4'; Friberg (yellow card) 86'	Stadium: Red Bull Arena; Attendance: 21,102; Referee: Chris Penso

June 25, 2016 MLS 15	Seattle Sounders FC	0–2	New York City FC	Seattle, Washington
14:00 (PDT)		Report; Boxscore	Lampard 38'; McNamara (yellow card) 42'; Iraola (yellow card) 75'; Matarrita 87'	Stadium: CenturyLink Field; Attendance: 47,537; Referee: Alan Kelly

July 2, 2016 MLS 16	Toronto FC	1–1	Seattle Sounders FC	Toronto, Ontario
16:30 (PDT)	Delgado (yellow card) 44'; Hamilton 60'; Beitashour (yellow card) 90+2'	Report; Boxscore	Morris 61'	Stadium: BMO Field; Attendance: 26,750; Referee: Kevin Stott

July 9, 2016 MLS 17	Seattle Sounders FC	0–1	LA Galaxy	Seattle, Washington
12:00 (PDT)		Report; Boxscore	Keane 15'; Romney (yellow card) 69'	Stadium: CenturyLink Field; Attendance: 40,813; Referee: Baldomero Toledo

July 13, 2016 MLS 18	Seattle Sounders FC	5–0	FC Dallas	Seattle, Washington
19:30 (PDT)	Dempsey 6' (pen.) (red card) 33'; Ivanschitz 18'; Morris 22'; Jones 61'; Roldan 73'	Report; Boxscore	Figueroa (red card) 4'; Ortiz (yellow card) 33'	Stadium: CenturyLink Field; Attendance: 40,101; Referee: Ricardo Salazar

July 17, 2016 MLS 19 Cascadia Cup	Portland Timbers	3–1	Seattle Sounders FC	Portland, Oregon
12:00 (PDT)	Jewsbury (yellow card) 11'; Valeri 44', 50'; Adi 64'	Report; Boxscore	Jones (yellow card) 37'; Marshall 59'; Alonso (yellow card) 66'	Stadium: Providence Park; Attendance: 21,144; Referee: Jair Marrufo

July 24, 2016 MLS 20	Sporting Kansas City	3–0	Seattle Sounders FC	Kansas City, Kansas
12:00 (PDT)	Dwyer 21', 79'; Espinoza (yellow card) 23'; Peterson 45+3'; Mustivar (yellow card) 65'	Report; Boxscore	Gomez (yellow card) 43'; Jones (yellow card) 57'	Stadium: Children's Mercy Park; Attendance: 18,563; Referee: Robert Sibiga

July 31, 2016 MLS 21	Seattle Sounders FC	1–1	LA Galaxy	Seattle, Washington
13:00 (PDT)	Roldan 49'	Report; Boxscore	Van Damme (yellow card) 65'; Lletget 78'	Stadium: CenturyLink Field; Attendance: 48,458; Referee: Drew Fischer

August 7, 2016 MLS 22	Orlando City SC	1–3	Seattle Sounders FC	Orlando, Florida
16:00 (PDT)	Hines 7' (yellow card) 58'; Nocerino (yellow card) 33'; Mateos (yellow card) 84'	Report; Boxscore	Dempsey 14', 37', 48'; Roldan (yellow card) 64'; Alonso (yellow card) 73'; Lodeiro (yellow card) 74'; Scott (yellow card) 76'	Stadium: Citrus Bowl; Attendance: 28,247; Referee: Allen Chapman

August 14, 2016 MLS 23	Seattle Sounders FC	2–1	Real Salt Lake	Seattle, Washington
16:00 (PDT)	Lodeiro 24'; Morris 37'	Report; Boxscore	Plata 62'; Glad (yellow card) 90+4'	Stadium: CenturyLink Field; Attendance: 39,491; Referee: Kevin Stott

August 21, 2016 MLS 24 Cascadia Cup	Seattle Sounders FC	3–1	Portland Timbers	Seattle, Washington
18:30 (PDT)	Ivanschitz (yellow card) 37'; Jones (yellow card) 40'; Dempsey 61' (pen.), 80'; Roldan 83'; Lodeiro (yellow card) 84'	Report; Boxscore	Chará (yellow card) 42'; Adi 90+3'	Stadium: CenturyLink Field; Attendance: 53,302; Referee: Alan Kelly

August 24, 2016 MLS 25	Houston Dynamo	1–1	Seattle Sounders FC	Houston, Texas
18:00 (PDT)	Wenger 75'	Report; Boxscore	Roldan (yellow card) 50'; Lodeiro 90+4'	Stadium: BBVA Compass Stadium; Attendance: 16,125; Referee: Armando Villarreal

August 28, 2016 MLS 26 Cascadia Cup	Portland Timbers	4–2	Seattle Sounders FC	Portland, Oregon
14:00 (PDT)	Andriuškevičius 16'; Adi 21'; Melano 29'; Taylor 44'	Boxscore	Lodeiro (yellow card) 25'; Ivanschitz (yellow card) 45+1' (goal) 47'; Morris 51'; Jones (yellow card) 78'; Valdez (yellow card) 90+1'	Stadium: Providence Park; Attendance: 21,144; Referee: Hilario Grajeda

September 10, 2016 MLS 27 Heritage Cup	San Jose Earthquakes	1–1	Seattle Sounders FC	San Jose, California
19:30 (PDT)	Wondolowski 20'; Stewart (yellow card) 44'; Dawkins (yellow card) 58'; Wynne (yellow card) 69'; Quintero (yellow card) 84'	Report; Boxscore	Alonso (yellow card) 54'; Lodeiro 80'	Stadium: Avaya Stadium; Attendance: 18,000; Referee: Baldomero Toledo

September 17, 2016 MLS 28 Cascadia Cup	Seattle Sounders FC	1–0	Vancouver Whitecaps FC	Seattle, Washington
13:00 (PDT)	Morris 81'; Mears (yellow card) 90+1'; Valdez (yellow card) 90+1'	Report; Boxscore	Techera (yellow card) 39'; Edgar (yellow card) 90+3'	Stadium: CenturyLink Field; Attendance: 47,111; Referee: Jair Marrufo

September 25, 2016 MLS 29	LA Galaxy	2–4	Seattle Sounders FC	Carson, California
13:00 (PDT)	Keane 20', 85' (pen.), (yellow card) 59'	Report; Boxscore	Van Damme 35' (o.g.); Morris 63', 73'; Valdez (yellow card) 66'; Alonso 78'; Lodeiro (yellow card) 81'; Torres (yellow card) 86'	Stadium: StubHub Center; Attendance: 25,819; Referee: Armando Villarreal

September 28, 2016 MLS 30	Seattle Sounders FC	1–0	Chicago Fire	Seattle, Washington
19:30 (PDT)	Marshall 24'; Lodeiro (yellow card) 58'	Report; Boxscore	Cociș (yellow card) 75'	Stadium: CenturyLink Field; Attendance: 39,269; Referee: Hilario Grajeda

October 2, 2016 MLS 31 Cascadia Cup	Vancouver Whitecaps FC	1–2	Seattle Sounders FC	Vancouver, British Columbia
17:00 (PDT)	Morales 25' (pen.) (red card) 53'; Barnes (yellow card) 32'; Pérez (yellow card) 80'	Report; Boxscore	Alonso 39'; Fisher (yellow card) 46'; Evans 81' (pen.) (red card) 84'	Stadium: BC Place; Attendance: 24,837; Referee: Ricardo Salazar

October 12, 2016 MLS 32	Seattle Sounders FC	0–0	Houston Dynamo	Seattle, Washington
19:30 (PDT)	Alonso (red card) 64'	Report; Boxscore	Clark (yellow card) 43'; Bruin (yellow card) 64'	Stadium: CenturyLink Field; Attendance: 39,772; Referee: Drew Fischer

October 16, 2016 MLS 33	FC Dallas	2–1	Seattle Sounders FC	Frisco, Texas
16:00 (PDT)	Gruezo (yellow card) 40'; Urruti (yellow card) 45+1' (goal) 79'; Ruiz 89'; Barrios (yellow card) 90+7'	Report; Boxscore	Lodeiro 41'; Mears (yellow card) 57'	Stadium: Toyota Stadium; Attendance: 14,468; Referee: Mark Geiger

October 23, 2016 MLS 34	Seattle Sounders FC	2–1	Real Salt Lake	Seattle, Washington
13:00 (PDT)	Fernández 3'; Roldan 31'; Marshall (yellow card) 37'; Friberg (yellow card) 40'	Report; Boxscore	Mulholland 4'; Plata (yellow card) 8'; Beckerman (yellow card) 48'; Wingert (yellow card) 78'	Stadium: CenturyLink Field; Attendance: 50,022; Referee: Baldomero Toledo

=== MLS Cup Playoffs ===
==== Knockout round ====
October 27, 2016	Seattle Sounders FC	1–0	Sporting Kansas City	Seattle, Washington
19:00 (PDT)	Alonso (yellow card) 32'; Valdez 88'	Report; Boxscore	Sinovic (yellow card) 63'; Feilhaber (yellow card) 71'; Espinoza (yellow card) 90+3'	Stadium: CenturyLink Field; Attendance: 36,151; Referee: Ismail Elfath

==== Western Conference Semifinals ====
October 30, 2016 Leg 1	Seattle Sounders FC	3–0	FC Dallas	Seattle, Washington
18:30 (PDT)	Valdez 50'; Lodeiro 55', 58'	Report; Boxscore	Figueroa (yellow card) 85'	Stadium: CenturyLink Field; Attendance: 37,073; Referee: Ricardo Salazar

November 6, 2016 Leg 2	FC Dallas	2–1 (2–4 agg.)	Seattle Sounders FC	Frisco, Texas
18:00 (PDT)	Akindele 25'; Harris (yellow card) 27'; Urruti 56'	Report; Boxscore	Roldan (yellow card) 27'; Lodeiro 54'; Frei (yellow card) 67'	Stadium: Toyota Stadium; Attendance: 14,878; Referee: Hilario Grajeda

==== Western Conference Finals ====
November 22, 2016 Leg 1	Seattle Sounders FC	2–1	Colorado Rapids	Seattle, Washington
19:00 (PDT)	Morris 20'; Lodeiro 61' (pen.)	Report; Boxscore	Doyle 13' (yellow card) 58'; Burch (yellow card) 34'; Cronin (yellow card) 67'	Stadium: CenturyLink Field; Attendance: 42,774; Referee: Chris Penso

November 27, 2016 Leg 2	Colorado Rapids	0–1 (1–3 agg.)	Seattle Sounders FC	Commerce City, Colorado
13:00 (PDT)	Burch (yellow card) 68'	Report; Boxscore	Torres (yellow card) 14'; Morris 56'	Stadium: Dick's Sporting Goods Park; Attendance: 17,695; Referee: Ricardo Salazar

==== MLS Cup Final ====
December 10, 2016	Toronto FC	0–0 (a.e.t.) (4–5 p)	Seattle Sounders FC	Toronto, Ontario
17:00 (PDT)	Bradley (yellow card) 90+3'	Report; Boxscore	Marshall (yellow card) 45+1'; Jones (yellow card) 72'	Stadium: BMO Field; Attendance: 36,045; Referee: Alan Kelly; MVP: Stefan Frei
	Penalties
	Altidore (penalty scored); Bradley (penalty missed); Cheyrou (penalty scored); Johnson (penalty scored); Moor (penalty scored); Morrow (penalty missed)		(penalty scored) Evans; (penalty scored) Ivanschitz; (penalty missed) Fernández; (penalty scored) Jones; (penalty scored) Lodeiro; (penalty scored) Torres

=== U.S. Open Cup ===
June 15, 2016 Fourth round	Seattle Sounders FC (MLS)	2–0	Kitsap Pumas (PDL)	Tukwila, Washington
19:30 (PDT)	Roldan 71'; Jones 90+1'	Report; Boxscore	Haddadi (yellow card) 10'; Keitz (yellow card) 60'	Stadium: Starfire Sports Complex; Attendance: 3,515; Referee: Chipalo Street

June 28, 2016 Round of 16	Real Salt Lake (MLS)	1–1 (a.e.t.) (1–4 p)	Seattle Sounders FC (MLS)	Sandy, Utah
19:00 (PDT)	Plata 43' (pen.); Morales (yellow card) 93'	Report; Boxscore	Gomez (yellow card) 42'; Valdez 51'	Stadium: Rio Tinto Stadium; Attendance: 17,087; Referee: Alex Chilowicz
	Penalties
	Martínez (penalty scored); Plata (penalty missed); Beckerman (penalty missed)		(penalty scored) Gomez; (penalty scored) Morris; (penalty scored) Scott; (penalty scored) Friberg

July 20, 2016 Quarterfinals	LA Galaxy (MLS)	4–2	Seattle Sounders FC (MLS)	Carson, California
19:30 (PDT)	Gordon 17'; Leonardo (yellow card) 31'; Giovani 77'; Lletget 85', 88'	Report; Boxscore	Farfan 4'; Remick (yellow card) 32'; Alfaro (yellow card) 57'; Gomez 58'	Stadium: StubHub Center; Attendance: 3,409; Referee: Alex Chilowicz

=== CONCACAF Champions League ===
==== 2015–16 ====
===== Quarterfinals =====
February 23, 2016 First leg	Seattle Sounders FC (United States)	2–2	(Mexico) América	Seattle, Washington, U.S.
19:00 (PDT)	Dempsey 44', 52'; Alonso (yellow card) 62'; Ivanschitz (yellow card) 90+1'	Report; Boxscore	Quintero 45'; Sambueza (yellow card) 58'; Peralta 70'; Aguilar (yellow card) 90+2'	Stadium: CenturyLink Field; Attendance: 42,836; Referee: Oscar Reyna

March 2, 2016 Second leg	América (Mexico)	3–1 (5–3 agg.)	(United States) Seattle Sounders FC	Mexico City, Mexico
17:00 (PDT)	Quintero 42'; Peralta 45+1'; Andrade 50'; Aguilar (yellow card) 66'	Report; Boxscore	Aguilar 41' (o.g.)	Stadium: Estadio Azteca; Referee: Valdin Legister

=== Mid-season friendlies ===
July 5, 2016 Friendly	Seattle Sounders FC (United States)	3–0	(England) West Ham United	Seattle, Washington
19:30 (PDT)	Alfaro (yellow card) 20'; Gomez 42' (pen.); Kovar (yellow card) 43'; Morris 70', 72'	Report	Browne (yellow card) 38'; Henry (yellow card) 88'	Stadium: CenturyLink Field; Attendance: 38,585; Referee: Chipalo Street

== Statistics ==
=== Appearances and goals ===
Last updated on December 11, 2016.

No.	Pos	Nat	Player	Total		Regular season		U.S. Open Cup		Playoffs		Champions League	
No.	Pos	Nat	Player	Apps	Goals	Apps	Goals	Apps	Goals	Apps	Goals	Apps	Goals
1	GK	(United States) USA	Tyler Miller	4	0	1	0	3	0	0	0	0	0
2	FW	(United States) USA	Clint Dempsey	19	10	17	8	0	0	0	0	2	2
3	DF	(United States) USA	Brad Evans	31	1	21+2	1	0+1	0	0+5	0	2	0
4	DF	(England) ENG	Tyrone Mears	40	0	32	0	0	0	6	0	2	0
6	MF	(Cuba) CUB	Osvaldo Alonso	40	3	32	3	0	0	6	0	2	0
7	MF	(United States) USA	Cristian Roldan	44	5	28+5	4	2+1	1	6	0	0+2	0
8	MF	(Sweden) SWE	Erik Friberg	34	0	18+7	0	0+2	0	5	0	2	0
9	FW	(United States) USA	Herculez Gomez	26	1	9+12	0	2+1	1	0+2	0	0	0
10	MF	(Uruguay) URU	Nicolás Lodeiro	19	8	13	4	0	0	6	4	0	0
11	MF	(United States) USA	Aaron Kovar	20	1	10+6	1	2	0	0	0	0+2	0
12	MF	(United States) USA	Michael Farfan	2	1	0+1	0	1	1	0	0	0	0
13	FW	(United States) USA	Jordan Morris	44	14	32+2	12	0+2	0	6	2	2	0
14	DF	(United States) USA	Chad Marshall	38	4	30	4	0	0	6	0	2	0
15	DF	(United States) USA	Dylan Remick	14	0	6+5	0	3	0	0	0	0	0
16	FW	(Paraguay) PAR	Nelson Valdez	33	3	8+16	0	1	1	5+1	2	2	0
17	FW	(United States) USA	Darwin Jones	5	0	0+2	0	1	0	0	0	0+2	0
18	MF	(United States) USA	Nathan Sturgis	3	0	0	0	3	0	0	0	0	0
20	DF	(United States) USA	Zach Scott	20	0	10+4	0	3	0	2+1	0	0	0
21	MF	(Uruguay) URU	Álvaro Fernández	13	1	8+2	1	0	0	1+2	0	0	0
22	GK	(United States) USA	Charlie Lyon	0	0	0	0	0	0	0	0	0	0
23	MF	(Austria) AUT	Andreas Ivanschitz	33	3	25+3	3	0	0	1+2	0	2	0
24	GK	(Switzerland) SUI	Stefan Frei	41	0	33	0	0	0	6	0	2	0
25	DF	(Mexico) MEX	Tony Alfaro	9	0	1+5	0	3	0	0	0	0	0
29	DF	(Panama) PAN	Román Torres	13	0	8+1	0	0	0	4	0	0	0
32	MF	(United States) USA	Zach Mathers [S2]	3	0	0	0	3	0	0	0	0	0
33	DF	(Trinidad and Tobago) TRI	Joevin Jones	43	3	29+4	2	0+2	1	6	0	2	0
39	FW	(Saint Vincent and the Grenadines) VIN	Oalex Anderson	17	0	2+13	0	2	0	0	0	0	0
80	FW	(United States) USA	Victor Mansaray	0	0	0	0	0	0	0	0	0	0
91	DF	(Jamaica) JAM	Oniel Fisher	12	0	2+4	0	3	0	0+3	0	0	0
Players out on loan:
5	DF	(United States) USA	Jimmy Ockford	0	0	0	0	0	0	0	0	0	0
31	DF	(Jamaica) JAM	Damion Lowe	0	0	0	0	0	0	0	0	0	0
Players who left the club during the season:
99	FW	(United States) USA	Andy Craven	1	0	0	0	0+1	0	0	0	0	0

[S2] - S2 player^{[A]}

== Transfers ==
For transfers in, dates listed are when Sounders FC officially signed the players to the roster. Transactions where only the rights to the players are acquired are not listed. For transfers out, dates listed are when Sounders FC officially removed the players from its roster, not when they signed with another club. If a player later signed with another club, his new club will be noted, but the date listed here remains the one when he was officially removed from Sounders FC roster.

=== In ===
No.	Pos.	Player	Transferred from	Fee/notes	Date	Source
1	GK	(United States) Tyler Miller	(United States) Seattle Sounders FC 2	Free	December 21, 2015	
	MF	(United States) Jordan Schweitzer	(United States) Denver Pioneers	Signed HGP deal	January 7, 2016	
33	DF	(Trinidad and Tobago) Joevin Jones	(United States) Chicago Fire	Trade	January 14, 2016	
12	MF	(United States) Michael Farfan	(United States) D.C. United	Free	January 20, 2016	
13	FW	(United States) Jordan Morris	(United States) Stanford	Signed HGP deal	January 21, 2016	
18	MF	(United States) Nathan Sturgis	(United States) Houston Dynamo	Free	February 23, 2016	
39	FW	(Saint Vincent and the Grenadines) Oalex Anderson	(United States) Seattle Sounders FC 2	Free	March 1, 2016	
25	DF	(United States) Tony Alfaro	(United States) Cal State Dominguez Hills	Draft pick	March 8, 2016	
9	FW	(United States) Herculez Gomez	(Canada) Toronto FC	Free	March 24, 2016	
10	MF	(Uruguay) Nicolás Lodeiro	(Argentina) Boca Juniors	Undisclosed (~$6M)	July 27, 2016	
21	MF	(Uruguay) Álvaro Fernández	(Argentina) Gimnasia (LP)	Undisclosed	July 28, 2016	

==== Draft picks ====
Draft picks are not automatically signed to the team roster. Only those who are signed to a contract will be listed as transfers in. Only trades involving draft picks and executed after the start of 2015 MLS SuperDraft will be listed in the notes.

Date	Player	Number	Position	Previous club	Notes	Ref
January 14, 2016	(United States) Tony Alfaro	25	DF	(United States) Cal State Dominguez Hills	MLS SuperDraft 2nd Round Pick (#27); Pick acquired from Toronto FC through Philadelphia Union and Orlando City SC in exchange for defender Eriq Zavaleta.	
January 14, 2016	(United States) Zach Mathers		MF	(United States) Duke	MLS SuperDraft 2nd Round Pick (#35)	
January 19, 2016	(Bosnia and Herzegovina) Emir Alihodzic		MF	(United States) Nebraska	MLS SuperDraft 3rd Round Pick (#54); Pick acquired from D.C. United in exchange for midfielder Alex Caskey.	
January 19, 2016	(United States) Michael Nelson		DF	(United States) Old Dominion	MLS SuperDraft 4th Round Pick (#76)	

=== Out ===
No.	Pos.	Player	Transferred to	Fee/notes	Date	Source
42	MF	(Uganda) Micheal Azira	(United States) Colorado Rapids	Waived, Second pick in 2015 MLS Waiver Draft	December 2, 2015	
19	FW	(United States) Chad Barrett	(United States) San Jose Earthquakes	Waived	December 2, 2015	
13	DF	(Colombia) Andrés Correa	(Colombia) Boyacá Chicó F.C.	Waived	December 2, 2015	
12	DF	(Costa Rica) Leo González	(Costa Rica) Herediano	Waived	December 2, 2015	
1	GK	(United States) Troy Perkins	Retired	Waived	December 2, 2015	
8	MF	(Mexico) Gonzalo Pineda	Retired	Waived	December 2, 2015	
18	MF	(Brazil) Thomás	(Brazil) Joinville Esporte Clube	Waived	December 2, 2015	
5	MF	(England) Andy Rose	(England) Coventry City	Free Transfer	December 2, 2015	
27	FW	(United States) Lamar Neagle	(United States) D.C. United	Traded for general and targeted allocation money	December 7, 2015	
10	MF	(Guatemala) Marco Pappa	(United States) Colorado Rapids	Waived, Traded for allocation money	December 15, 2015	
9	FW	(Nigeria) Obafemi Martins	(China) Shanghai Shenhua	Undisclosed Fee	February 25, 2016	
	MF	(United States) Jordan Schweitzer	(United States) Seattle Sounders FC 2	Waived	March 1, 2016	
5	DF	(United States) Jimmy Ockford	(United States) New York Cosmos	Out on Loan	March 1, 2016	
31	DF	(Jamaica) Damion Lowe	(United States) Minnesota United FC	Out on Loan	March 8, 2016	
99	FW	(United States) Andy Craven	(United States) Oklahoma City Energy FC	Waived	August 4, 2016	

== See also ==
- Seattle Sounders FC
- 2016 in American soccer
- 2016 Major League Soccer season

== Notes ==
A. ^{a} Player who were under contract with Seattle Sounders FC 2.
