= List of Tacoma Defiance seasons =

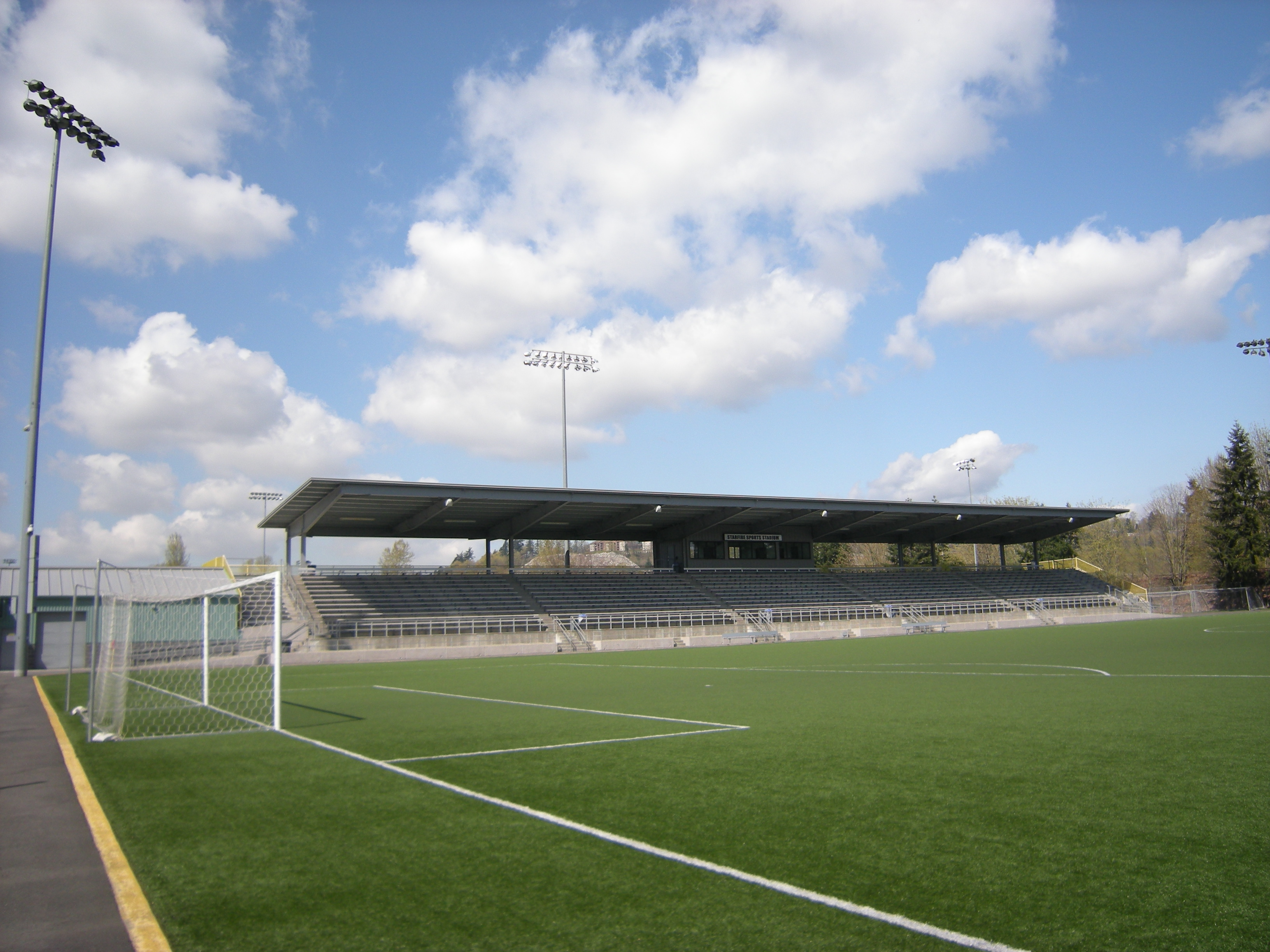
Starfire Stadium is the home venue of the Tacoma Defiance.

The Tacoma Defiance are an American soccer team based in Tukwila, Washington, part of the Seattle metropolitan area. They compete in the Western Conference of MLS Next Pro, a third-division men's league, as the reserve team of Major League Soccer (MLS) club Seattle Sounders FC. The team, originally named Seattle Sounders FC 2 (S2), were established in 2014 as part of an agreement between MLS and the United Soccer League (USL) to host reserve teams in the second-division league (later renamed the USL Championship). The Sounders previously had a reserve team in the MLS Reserve League from 2011 to 2014. S2 played at Starfire Stadium in Tukwila, the training facility for the Sounders, beginning in the 2015 season.

S2 were relocated in 2018 to Cheney Stadium in Tacoma, Washington, after the Tacoma Rainiers baseball team were also added to the ownership group a year earlier. The team was then renamed to the Defiance in 2019. The MLS–USL agreement was terminated in 2021 and the Defiance were moved the following season into MLS Next Pro, a new third-division league for reserve teams. The team also moved back to Starfire Stadium in Tukwila due to scheduling conflicts with the baseball season and the abandonment of plans to build a soccer-specific stadium with National Women's Soccer League club OL Reign.

The regular season for MLS Next Pro clubs has 28 matches and runs for 30 weeks from March to October; the league does not have draws and instead has tied matches proceed into a penalty shootout to decide the result. Teams earn three points for a win, two points for a shootout win, one point for a shootout loss, and no points for a loss. The top nine teams in each conference qualify for the playoffs, a single-elimination knockout tournament that decides the season's champion. The higher-seeded team in each round hosts the match and, if applicable, picks from the remaining opponents in the lower seeds.

In addition to league play, MLS Next Pro clubs can participate in the U.S. Open Cup, an annual knockout tournament organized by the United States Soccer Federation that is open to all eligible teams in the country. In their inaugural season, S2 advanced to the fourth round of the 2015 U.S. Open Cup and were eliminated in the same round as their parent team. From 2016 to 2023, reserve teams that were owned by another participant in a higher division were barred from participating in the U.S. Open Cup; the policy was reversed after MLS withdrew most of its teams from the competition in 2024. As of 2025, MLS clubs that qualified for continental competitions are able to instead send their MLS Next Pro team to represent them in the U.S. Open Cup.

== Key ==
Key to competitions

- USL Championship (USLC) – A second-division league in U.S. men's soccer formed in 2011 that adopted its current name in 2019. It was named USL Pro from 2011 to 2014 and United Soccer League (USL) from 2015 to 2018.
- MLS Next Pro (MLSNP) – A third-division league in U.S. men's soccer founded in 2021 that primarily comprises reserve teams for Major League Soccer (MLS) teams.
- U.S. Open Cup (USOC) – The premier knockout cup competition in U.S. soccer, first contested in 1914 and open to all registered teams.

Key to colors and symbols

1st or W	Winners
2nd or RU	Runners-up
3rd	Third place
Last	Last place
♦	League top scorer
Italics	Ongoing competition

Key to cup record

- DNE = Did not enter
- DNQ = Did not qualify
- NH = Competition not held or canceled
- QR = Qualifying round
- PR = Preliminary round
- GS = Group stage
- WC = Wildcard or Play-in Round
- R1 = First round or Conference Quarterfinals
- R2 = Second round
- R3 = Third round

Key to cup record (cont.)

- R4 = Fourth round
- R5 = Fifth round
- Ro16 = Round of 16
- Ro32 = Round of 32
- QF = Quarterfinals or Conference Semifinals
- SF = Semifinals or Conference Finals
- F = Final
- RU = Runners-up
- W = Winners

== Seasons ==
Results of Tacoma Defiance league and cup competitions by season
Season	League												Position		Playoffs	USOC	Top goalscorer(s) (Note: Top goalscorer(s) includes all goals scored in the regular season, playoffs, U.S. Open Cup, and other competitive matches.)		Refs.
Season	Div	League	Pld	W	SW (Note: MLS Next Pro uses a penalty shootout to decide matches that are tied after regulation time. Teams receive one point for a shootout loss and two points for a shootout win.)	L	D (Note: Includes shootout wins)	GF	GA	GD	Pts	PPG	Conf.	Overall	Playoffs	USOC	Player(s)	Goals	Refs.
2015	2	USL	28	13	—	12	3	45	42	+3	42	1.50	6th	9th	R1	R4	Pablo Rossi	11	
2016	2	USL	30	9	—	13	8	35	50	−15	35	1.17	12th	20th	DNQ	DNE	Darwin Jones	7	
2017	2	USL	32	9	—	19	4	42	61	−19	31	0.97	12th	26th	DNQ	DNE	Zach Mathers	11	
2018	2	USL	34	6	—	21	7	40	71	−31	25	0.74	16th	30th	DNQ	DNE	David Estrada	11	
2019	2	USLC	34	8	—	19	7	42	82	−40	31	0.91	17th	33rd	DNQ	DNE	Justin Dhillon	12	
2020	2	USLC	16 (Note: Due to the COVID-19 pandemic, the 2020 USL Championship season was shortened to 16 matches played from July to October within limited geographic regions. The Defiance played two matches prior to the season's suspension in March that were counted in the standings, leaving 14 remaining matches.)	4	—	10	2	25	32	−7	14	0.88	12th	26th	DNQ	NH (Note: The 2020 and 2021 editions of the U.S. Open Cup were canceled due to the COVID-19 pandemic.)	Alec Díaz	6	
2021	2	USLC	32	10	—	13	9	37	41	−4	39	1.22	11th	21st	DNQ	NH	Samuel Adeniran	13	
2022	3 (Note: In 2022, the Tacoma Defiance joined 19 other reserve teams affiliated with MLS clubs in the inaugural season of MLS Next Pro, a third-division league run by MLS. In doing so, they voluntarily moved down a tier in the U.S. league system.)	MLSNP	24	14	3	6	4	57	25	+32	49	2.04	2nd	3rd	SF	DNE	Marlon Vargas	13	
2023	3	MLSNP	28	14	6	5	9	57	36	+21	57	2.04	2nd	3rd	R1	DNE	Braudílio Rodrigues	17	
2024	3	MLSNP	28	13	2	10	5	59	53	+6	46	1.64	4th	8th	QF	DNE	Chris Aquino	11	
2025	3	MLSNP	28	10	2	14	4	62	67	−5	36	1.29	12th	23rd	DNQ	Ro32	Yu Tsukanome	18	
2026	3	MLSNP	28	8	3	12	5	40	44	−4	41	1.46	9th	20th	WC	DNE	Mark Bronnik	13	
