= Nate Tongovula =

Sierra Leonean footballer (born 1996)

Personal information
- Full name: Nathaniel Tongovula
- Date of birth: 7 September 1996 (age 30)
- Place of birth: Freetown, Sierra Leone
- Position: Forward

Senior career*
| Years | Team | Apps | (Gls) |
| 2013–2015 | Port Authority | | |
| 2015 | Seattle Sounders FC 2 | 4 | (0) |

International career^{‡}
| 2013– | Sierra Leone U20 | | |
- * Club domestic league appearances and goals as of 23 July 2015 ‡ National team caps and goals as of 13 July 2015

Nathaniel Tongovula (born 7 September 1996) is a Sierra Leonean footballer who plays as a forward.

== Career ==
=== Club ===
Tongovula previously played for Ports Authority F.C. of the Sierra Leone National Premier League. While playing in his homeland, Tongovula was known by the nickname Anderson. To open the 2013 SLNPL season, a Sierra Leone journalist stated that Tongovula "stole the show displaying his skills with the ball" as Port Authority drew with FC Johansen. In Port Authority's next match, he scored his first goal of the season as the team won 3–1 against the Republic of Sierra Leone Armed Forces FC which put Port Authority in the league lead early in the season. In June 2014, he was invited for a trial with Sporting Kansas City of Major League Soccer and was granted a three-year American entry visa. In February 2015, he went on trial with the Seattle Sounders FC 2, the reserve squad of the Seattle Sounders FC, another MLS club. Around this time, Tongovula's agent and former coach were the subject of controversy as Ports Authority claimed that they were allegedly not informed of the player's trial with Seattle and that Tongovula's parents had been presented with an agency agreement which was not registered with the SLFA. Tongovula eventually signed with Sounders 2 and was part of the team's senior squad while also playing with the academy team beginning with its 2014–2015 season. He made his league debut for the club on 5 June 2015 coming on as an 80th-minute substitute for Sam Garza against the Tulsa Roughnecks. Tongovula made his Lamar Hunt U.S. Open Cup debut in the second round of the 2015 edition against the Kitsap Pumas. He started the match and provided an assist to Pablo Rossi as Seattle earned the 4–2 victory.

=== International ===
Tongovula has represented Sierra Leone at the youth level, including during its 2015 African U-20 Championship qualification campaign. He has been called up to the senior squad, including in May 2014 for a 2015 Africa Cup of Nations qualification match against Swaziland.
