= Tyler Miller =

American soccer player (born 1993)

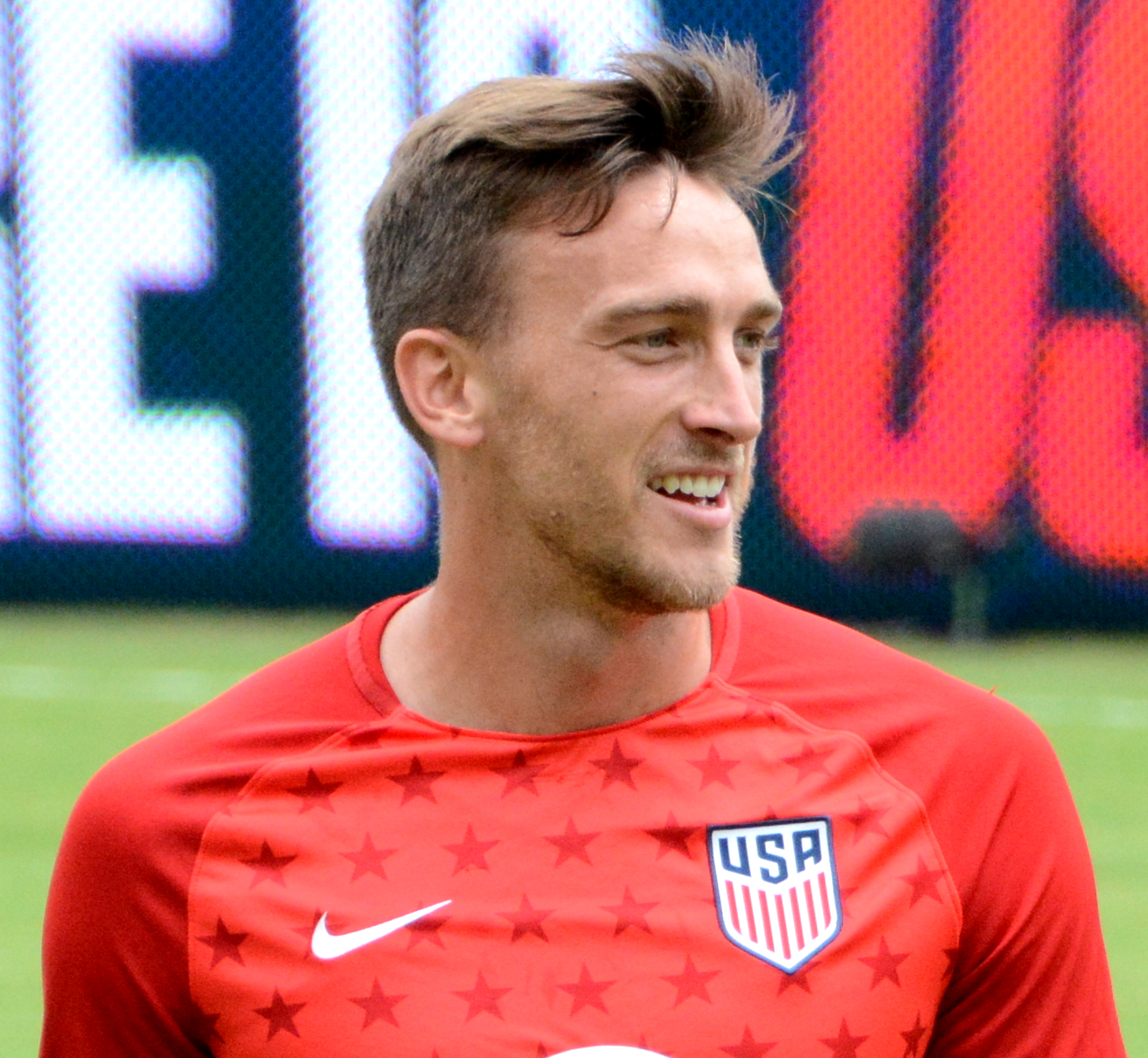
- Miller with the United States in 2019

Personal information
- Full name: Tyler Austin Miller
- Date of birth: March 12, 1993 (age 33)
- Place of birth: Woodbury, New Jersey, U.S.
- Height: 6 ft 4 in (1.93 m)
- Position: Goalkeeper

Team information
- Current team: Charlotte FC
- Number: 21

College career
Years	Team	Apps	(Gls)
2011–2014	Northwestern Wildcats	77	(0)

Senior career*
Years	Team	Apps	(Gls)
2012	Ocean City Nor'easters	3	(0)
2013–2014	Chicago Fire U-23	8	(0)
2015	SVN Zweibrücken	10	(0)
2015	Seattle Sounders FC 2	1	(0)
2016–2017	Seattle Sounders FC	2	(0)
2016–2017	→ Seattle Sounders FC 2	34	(0)
2018–2019	Los Angeles FC	61	(0)
2020–2022	Minnesota United	38	(0)
2023–2024	D.C. United	30	(0)
2025	Notts County	0	(0)
2025–2026	Bolton Wanderers	3	(0)
2026–	Charlotte FC	0	(0)
2026–	→ Crown Legacy FC	1	(0)

International career^{‡}
2015	United States U23	2	(0)
Medal record
Representing United States
Runner-up	CONCACAF Gold Cup	2019
- * Club domestic league appearances and goals as of 12:21, 25 September 2026 (UTC) ‡ National team caps and goals as of July 13, 2015

Tyler Austin Miller (born March 12, 1993) is an American professional soccer player who plays as a goalkeeper for Major League Soccer club Charlotte FC.

Miller grew up in Woodbury, New Jersey and attended Bishop Eustace Preparatory School.

== Youth and college career ==
Miller was raised in Woodbury, New Jersey, and played for a youth team based in Pittsgrove Township as well as Bishop Eustace Preparatory School. He spent his entire college career at Northwestern University in Illinois and made a total of 77 appearances for the Wildcats. Miller finished with 36 career shutouts, setting a new school record. He majored in communications and minored in English while at Northwestern University and worked for MLS club Chicago Fire as an intern. Miller also trained with the team during his internship.

He also played in the Premier Development League for Ocean City Nor'easters and Chicago Fire U-23.

== Club career ==
=== Seattle Sounders FC ===
On January 15, 2015, Miller was drafted in the second round (33rd overall) of the 2015 MLS SuperDraft by Seattle Sounders FC. Four days later however, Miller signed with German Regionalliga side SVN Zweibrücken where he made 10 appearances. On July 9, 2015, Miller signed with USL club Seattle Sounders FC 2. He made his debut three days later in a 4–0 victory over Arizona United SC.

Miller missed the rest of the USL season while recovering from thumb surgery. He signed a first-team contract with the Sounders at the end of the year. While initially expected to be a bench player, Miller made his first-team debut in the second match of the 2016 season after starter Stefan Frei was ruled out with an injury. The team lost 2–1 to Real Salt Lake during the match, which was played on Miller's birthday. His next match for the Sounders was a 2016 U.S. Open Cup match, also against Real Salt Lake, in which Miller made several saves to win a penalty shootout. He played in two more U.S. Open Cup matches and was on the bench during the team's MLS Cup 2016 victory; Miller also played in several USL matches for Seattle Sounders FC 2. He made one regular season appearance in 2017 but was later called up for a MLS Cup Playoff match against the Houston Dynamo, where Miller kept a clean sheet.

=== Los Angeles FC ===
On December 12, 2017, Miller was selected by Los Angeles FC with the first selection in the 2017 MLS Expansion Draft. On March 4, 2018, Miller debuted in a match against his former team, the Seattle Sounders. He made seven saves to keep a clean sheet as LAFC won 1–0.

Miller went on to play in 33 matches for LAFC in their inaugural season, as Luis López was injured at the start of the year. He earned 10 shutouts in the regular season.

=== Minnesota United ===
On January 16, 2020, Los Angeles FC traded Miller to Minnesota United FC in exchange for $150,000 GAM in 2020 and $50,000 TAM in 2021. The transaction included Minnesota signing Miller to a new contract through the 2022 season with a club option for an additional year. On August 19, 2020, the club announced that Miller had undergone hip surgery and would miss the remainder of the 2020 season. He later returned to the club as a starter for the 2021 season, but was later replaced in 2022 by Dayne St. Clair.

=== D.C. United ===
On November 23, 2022, Miller signed with D.C. United as a free agent ahead of their 2023 season. He became their starting goalkeeper and was assigned to play as a sweeper-keeper by manager Wayne Rooney. Miller was selected by Rooney to play in the 2023 MLS All-Star Game against Arsenal F.C., which was hosted by D.C. United. In August, Miller suffered a torn rotator cuff and underwent season-ending shoulder surgery. D.C. United declined his contract option following their 2024 season.

=== Notts County ===
On 1 April 2025, Miller joined English League Two side Notts County on a deal until the end of the season.

On 20 May 2025, Notts County said the player would be released in June when his contract expired.

=== Bolton Wanderers ===
On 13 August 2025, Miller joined League One side Bolton Wanderers on a deal until the end of the season.

=== Charlotte ===
On 20 January 2026, Miller returned to the United States as he signed for Charlotte on a two and a half year deal for an undisclosed fee.

== International career ==
Miller represented the United States at the under-23 level and played in two friendly matches during preparations for 2015 CONCACAF Men's Olympic Qualifying Championship.

He was first called up to the senior national team by Gregg Berhalter for a training camp in January 2019, along with other MLS players. Miller was later named to the United States roster for the 2019 CONCACAF Gold Cup.

== Career statistics ==
=== Club ===
As of match played July 6, 2024

Appearances and goals by club, season and competition
Club	Season	League			National cup		Continental		Other		Total	
Club	Season	Division	Apps	Goals	Apps	Goals	Apps	Goals	Apps	Goals	Apps	Goals
SVN Zweibrücken	2014–15	Regionalliga	10	0	—		—		—		10	0
Seattle Sounders FC 2	2015	USL	1	0	—		—		—		1	0
Seattle Sounders FC	2016	MLS	1	0	3	0	—		—		4	0
Seattle Sounders FC	2017	MLS	1	0	2	0	—		1 (Note: Appearance(s) in MLS Cup Playoffs)	0	4	0
Seattle Sounders FC	Total		2	0	5	0	—		1	0	8	0
Seattle Sounders FC 2 (loan)	2016	USL	12	0	—		—		—		12	0
Seattle Sounders FC 2 (loan)	2017	USL	22	0	—		—		—		22	0
Seattle Sounders FC 2 (loan)	Total		34	0	—		—		—		34	0
Los Angeles FC	2018	MLS	33	0	4	0	—		1	0	38	0
Los Angeles FC	2019	MLS	28	0	—		—		2	0	30	0
Los Angeles FC	Total		61	0	4	0	—		3	0	68	0
Minnesota United FC	2020	MLS	5	0	—		—		—		5	0
Minnesota United FC	2021	MLS	30	0	—		—		—		30	0
Minnesota United FC	2022	MLS	3	0	2	0	—		—		5	0
Minnesota United FC	Total		38	0	2	0	—		—		40	0
D.C. United	2023	MLS	25	0	0	0	—		0	0	25	0
D.C. United	2024	MLS	5	0	—		—		0	0	5	0
D.C. United	Total		30	0	0	0	—		0	0	30	0
Career total			176	0	11	0	0	0	4	0	191	0

== Honors ==
Seattle Sounders FC

- MLS Cup: 2016

Los Angeles FC

- Supporters' Shield: 2019

Individual

- MLS All-Star: 2023
