= Cristian Roldan =

American soccer player (born 1995)

- Roldan with the United States in 2026

Personal information
- Full name: Cristian Roldan
- Date of birth: June 3, 1995 (age 31)
- Place of birth: Artesia, California, U.S.
- Height: 5 ft 8 in (1.72 m)
- Position: Midfielder

Team information
- Current team: Seattle Sounders FC
- Number: 7

College career
Years	Team	Apps	(Gls)
2013–2014	Washington Huskies	41	(10)

Senior career*
Years	Team	Apps	(Gls)
2013–2014	Washington Crossfire	13	(6)
2015	Seattle Sounders FC 2	1	(1)
2015–	Seattle Sounders FC	333	(42)

International career^{‡}
2015	United States U20	2	(0)
2017–	United States	47	(0)
Medal record
Men's Soccer
Representing United States
CONCACAF Gold Cup
Winner	2017 United States
Winner	2021 United States
Runner-up	2019 United States
- * Club domestic league appearances and goals as of November 7, 2026 ‡ National team caps and goals as of June 6, 2026

Cristian Roldan (born June 3, 1995) is an American professional soccer player who plays as a midfielder for Major League Soccer club Seattle Sounders FC, which he captains, and the United States national team.

Roldan was the 2013 Gatorade National Player of the Year while playing for El Rancho High School in Pico Rivera, California, and played collegiate soccer for the Washington Huskies. He was picked by the Sounders in the 2015 MLS SuperDraft and developed into a regular starting player for the club, with over 300 total appearances as of 2024.

== Early life ==
Roldan was featured in an Adidas commercial as a nine-year-old, selected for his soccer ball juggling skills from 110 kids who tried out for the commercial. Roldan was also named the 2013 Gatorade National Player of the Year in soccer while attending El Rancho High School in Pico Rivera, California.

== Club career ==
=== College and amateur ===
Roldan declined invitations from the LA Galaxy and Chivas USA to join their academy teams and led the El Rancho Dons to an undefeated season with 26 wins. In his junior year, he had 21 goals and 21 assists for El Rancho and also played for youth club Union Independiente. During the 2012–13 season, he scored 54 goals and 30 assists and led El Rancho to a regional high school championship.

Roldan was scouted by the University of Washington at a tournament in San Diego and spent his college career with the Washington Huskies. In his two seasons of college soccer, Roldan made a total of 41 appearances and tallied 10 goals and seven assists as he helped lead the team to a Pac-12 title in 2013. Roldan was named the 2013 Pac-12 Freshman of the Year, beating future Sounders teammate Jordan Morris from the Stanford Cardinal.

During the college offseason, Roldan played in the Premier Development League for the Washington Crossfire. He joined the team in 2013 as part of preparations to join the Huskies. Roldan also played for the Portland Timbers U23s in the 2014 MLS Homegrown Game.

=== Seattle Sounders FC ===
==== 2015: Debut season ====
On January 8, 2015, it was announced that Roldan had left college early to sign a Generation Adidas contract with Major League Soccer. He was expected to be selected early in the 2015 MLS SuperDraft, but was chosen late in the first round with the 16th overall pick by Seattle Sounders FC. The Sounders traded with Real Salt Lake for the draft pick and had scouted Roldan during his offseason training sessions with the team. After making two substitute appearances the first two weeks of the season against the New England Revolution and the San Jose Earthquakes, Roldan made a substitute appearance for USL affiliate club Seattle Sounders FC 2 on March 21 and scored an 89th-minute goal in a 4–2 victory over defending USL champion Sacramento Republic FC. Due to injuries and international call-ups, he made his first MLS start the following week in a goalless draw away to FC Dallas.

==== 2016: First goal ====
Roldan developed into a deep-lying midfielder and earned a regular place in the starting lineup under head coach Sigi Schmid following his performances as an "impact substitute". He was compared to captain and defensive midfielder Osvaldo Alonso, who Roldan regarded as a mentor and ultimately replaced. Roldan scored his first career Major League Soccer goal on July 13, 2016, during a 5–0 win over FC Dallas.

==== 2017: Partnership with Jordan Morris ====
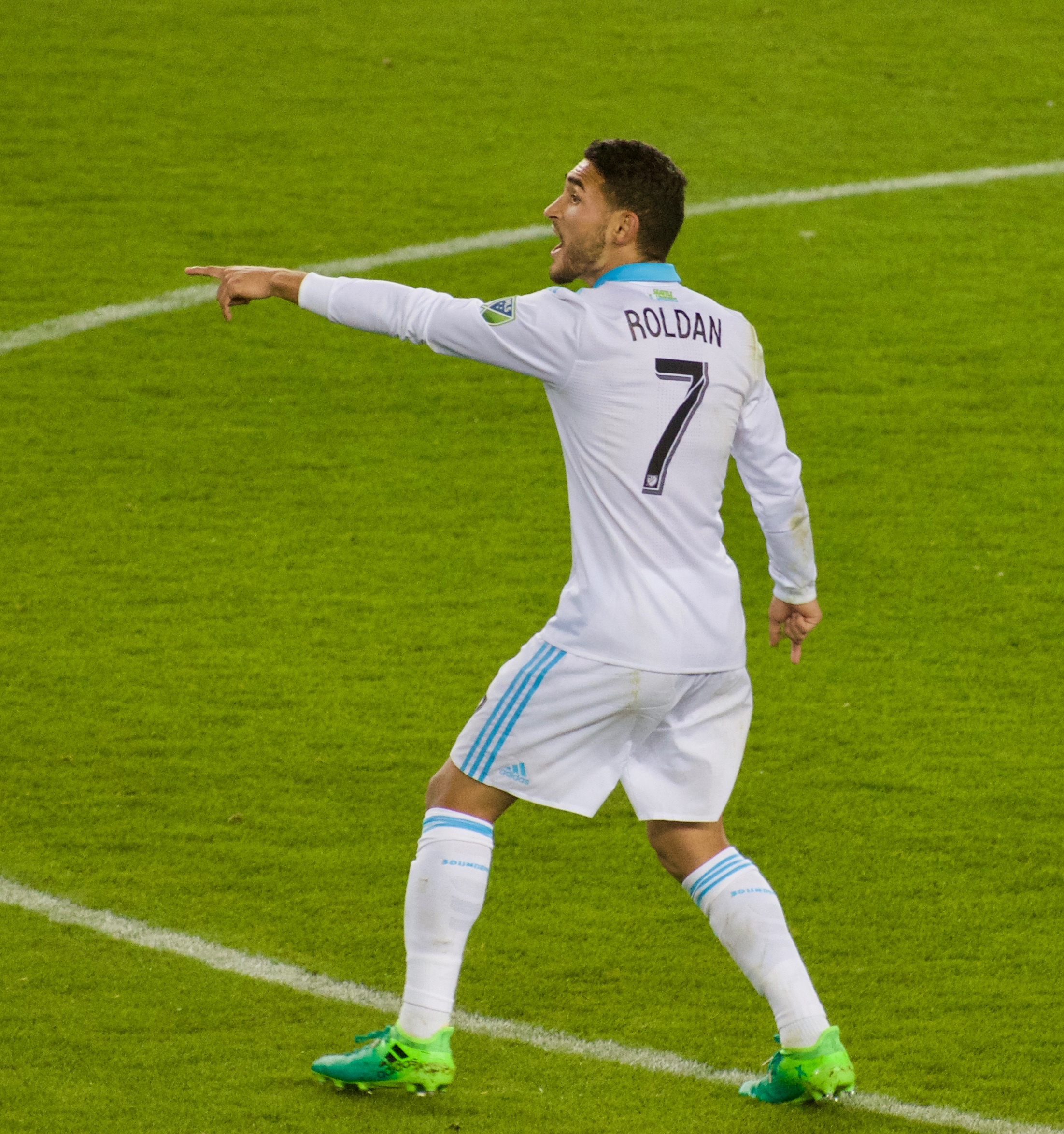
Roldan playing for the Seattle Sounders in 2017

He formed a partnership and personal friendship with fellow rookie Jordan Morris—previously a collegiate rival—that was dubbed "Jorstian Mordan".

==== 2018: First contract extension ====
In December 2018, Roldan agreed to a five-year, $4-million dollar contract extension with the Sounders.

==== 2019: MLS Cup title ====
On November 10, 2019, Roldan featured for Seattle in a 3–1 home win over Toronto FC in MLS Cup 2019; he was involved in the build-up to his team's opening goal, after colliding with Jonathan Osorio, who lost the ball, while Seattle went on to score with Kelvin Leerdam.

==== 2022: Champions League title ====
He also played all eight matches in Seattle's run to the 2022 CONCACAF Champions League title, providing one goal and five assists, and was named to the Team of the Tournament. Roldan underwent groin surgery in August 2022 to treat a sports hernia, his first major injury during his professional career. He returned to the team for their final three matches of the regular season as the Sounders failed to qualify for the playoffs.

==== 2023: Second contract extension ====
He signed a five-year contract extension with the Sounders in January 2023 alongside Morris. Roldan suffered a concussion during a regular season match against St. Louis City SC in April and missed several matches while undergoing treatment; he resumed training in late May. Roldan had a second concussion during a Leagues Cup match in July and underwent more treatment, including sleep monitoring, at a facility in Detroit. He returned to play against FC Dallas on September 16.

== International career ==
=== 2015: Youth level ===
Roldan represented the United States at under-20 level.

=== 2017: Senior debut and first CONCACAF Gold Cup ===
He was also eligible to represent either Guatemala or El Salvador through his parents, and mentioned in an interview that he had been offered senior call-ups from both nations. On July 12, 2017, he was cap-tied to the United States national team by starting their 2017 CONCACAF Gold Cup group stage match against Martinique.

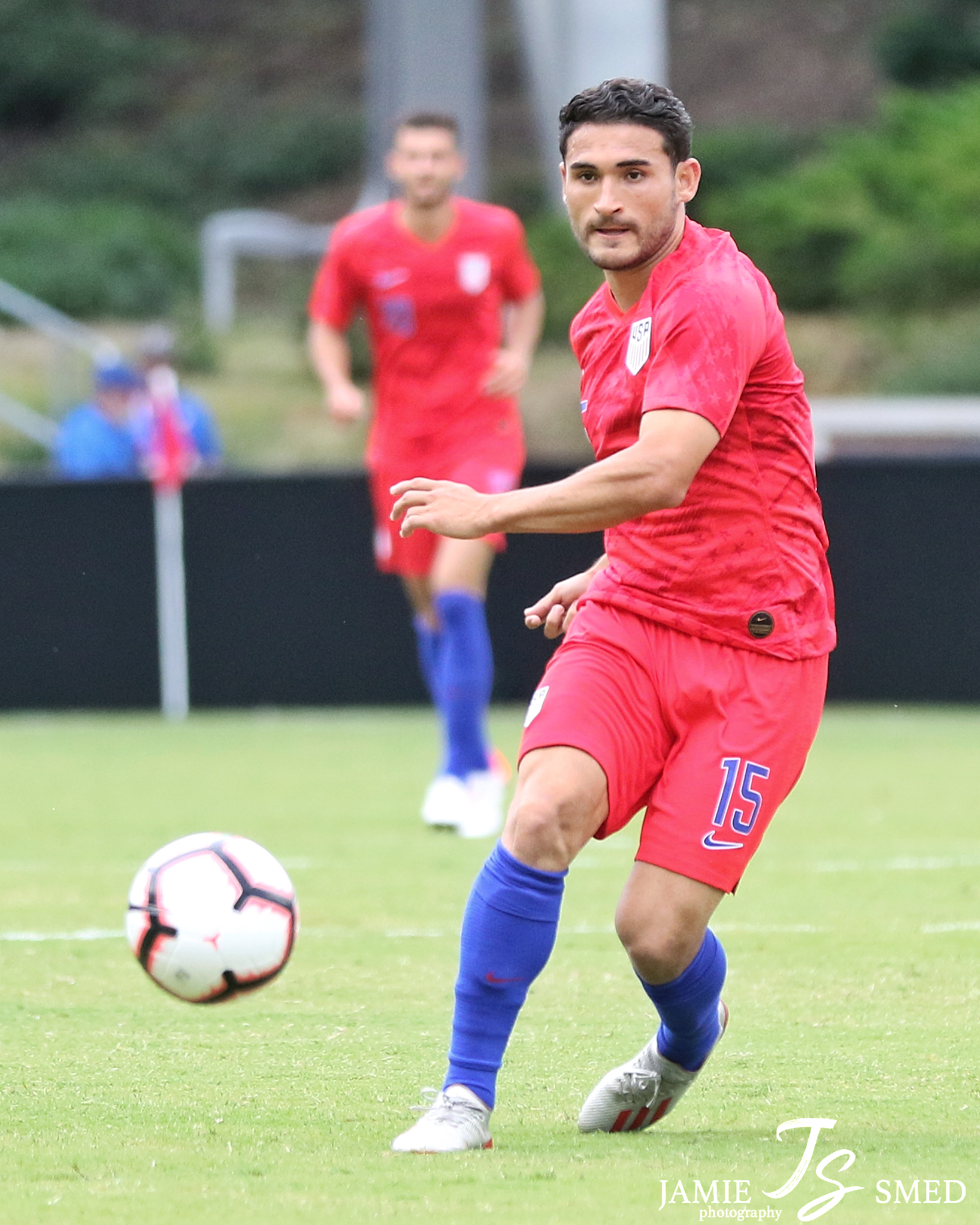
Roldan playing for the United States in 2019

=== 2022: First FIFA World Cup ===
Roldan and Sounders teammate Jordan Morris were called up to the final roster for the 2022 FIFA World Cup. Roldan had played limited minutes during the preceding World Cup qualifying campaign, but was chosen by Gregg Berhalter for his leadership in training and ability to play in several roles.

=== 2026: Second FIFA World Cup ===
On May 26, 2026, Roldan was selected in the 26-man squad for the 2026 FIFA World Cup.

== Personal life ==
Roldan is of Salvadoran and Guatemalan descent, and has an older brother named Cesar Jr., who works as a trainer for the LA Galaxy, and a younger brother Alex who has also played for the Sounders since 2019.

He married physician assistant Ciana Baron on December 31, 2022.

== Career statistics ==
=== Club ===
As of match played November 19, 2026

Appearances and goals by club, season, and competition
Club	Season	League			Playoffs (Note: Includes MLS Cup playoffs)		National cup (Note: Includes U.S. Open Cup)		Continental		Other		Total	
Club	Season	Division	Apps	Goals	Apps	Goals	Apps	Goals	Apps	Goals	Apps	Goals	Apps	Goals
Seattle Sounders FC 2	2015	USL	1	1	—		—		—		—		1	1
Seattle Sounders FC	2015	MLS	22	0	3	0	1	0	6 (Note: Appearances in CONCACAF Champions League/Cup)	0	—		32	0
Seattle Sounders FC	2016	MLS	33	4	6	0	3	1	—		—		42	5
Seattle Sounders FC	2017	MLS	33	6	5	0	0	0	—		—		38	6
Seattle Sounders FC	2018	MLS	34	4	1	0	0	0	4	0	—		39	4
Seattle Sounders FC	2019	MLS	29	6	4	0	0	0	—		—		33	6
Seattle Sounders FC	2020	MLS	22 (Note: Includes three appearances in MLS is Back Tournament group stage)	2	4	0	—		2	1	1 (Note: Appearance in MLS is Back Tournament knockout stage)	0	29	3
Seattle Sounders FC	2021	MLS	28	6	1	0	—		—		3 (Note: Appearances in Leagues Cup)	1	32	7
Seattle Sounders FC	2022	MLS	26	4	—		0	0	8	1	—		34	5
Seattle Sounders FC	2023	MLS	16	3	4	0	0	0	—		2 (Note: One appearance in FIFA Club World Cup, one appearance in Leagues Cup)	0	22	3
Seattle Sounders FC	2024	MLS	33	1	4	1	3	0	—		5	0	45	2
Seattle Sounders FC	2025	MLS	31	1	3	0	—		3	0	9 (Note: Three appearances and one goal in FIFA Club World Cup, six appearances in Leagues Cup)	1	46	2
Seattle Sounders FC	2026	MLS	26	5	1	0	—		4	0	1 (Note: Appearance in Leagues Cup)	0	32	5
Seattle Sounders FC	Total		333	42	36	1	8	1	26	2	21	1	424	47
Career total			334	43	36	1	8	1	26	2	21	1	425	48

=== International ===
As of match played June 6, 2026

Appearances and goals by national team and year
National team	Year	Apps	Goals
United States	2017	1	0
United States	2018	4	0
United States	2019	14	0
United States	2020	0	0
United States	2021	11	0
United States	2022	2	0
United States	2023	5	0
United States	2024	0	0
United States	2025	6	0
United States	2026	4	0
Total		47	0

== Honors ==
Seattle Sounders FC

- MLS Cup: 2016, 2019
- CONCACAF Champions League: 2022
- Leagues Cup: 2025

United States

- CONCACAF Gold Cup: 2017, 2021

Individual

- MLS All-Star: 2021
- CONCACAF Champions League Best XI: 2022
- MLS Best XI: 2025

== See also ==
- List of Seattle Sounders FC players
