= Dylan Remick =

American soccer player (born 1991)

Personal information
- Date of birth: May 19, 1991 (age 35)
- Place of birth: Inverness, Illinois, U.S.
- Height: 1.83 m (6 ft 0 in)
- Position: Defender

Youth career
- –2009: FC United

College career
Years	Team	Apps	(Gls)
2009–2012	Brown Bears	71	(6)

Senior career*
Years	Team	Apps	(Gls)
2012	Worcester Hydra	4	(1)
2013–2016	Seattle Sounders FC	44	(0)
2015–2016	→ Seattle Sounders FC 2 (loan)	4	(0)
2017–2018	Houston Dynamo	14	(2)
2017	→ Rio Grande Valley FC Toros (loan)	1	(0)
Total		67	(3)
- * Club domestic league appearances and goals

Dylan Remick (born May 19, 1991) is an American retired soccer player who played for Seattle Sounders FC and the Houston Dynamo in Major League Soccer. He graduated from Brown University in 2012 and was selected the following year by Seattle in the MLS SuperDraft.

== Career ==
=== College and amateur ===
Remick spent all four years of his college career at Brown University. While at Brown, he was a member of "Los Banditos". He majored in biology and pre-med studies while at Brown.

Remick had played in high school as a centerback, was switched to a leftback in his freshman year at brown. In his freshman year, he made 17 appearances for the Bears and finished the year with two goals and an assist. In 2010, Remick started all 20 games for the Bears and helped lead a defense that shutout 11 teams during the campaign and allowed just one goal in the first 11 games and 12 overall during the season. He went on to be named First Team All-Ivy defender in 2010. In 2011, Remick missed four games due to injury but he did manage to make 16 appearances for the Bears and tallied two goals and two assists. His two goals came in the NCAA Tournament. The first one came in Brown's upset win over ninth seeded St. John's in the second round. The other one came in Brown's 3–2 overtime defeat in the Sweet 16 to Saint Mary's. Remick was named First-team All-Ivy for the second year in a row, as well as First Team All-ECAC honoree and an All-Northeast Region selection. In 2012, Remick appeared in 18 of Brown's 19 games finished with two goals. He was also the team leader in assists with seven and tied for third on the team in points with 11. Remick would again be named First-team All-Ivy in 2012. He was also named Second Team All-American by the NSCAA, making him the first Brown soccer All-American since Jeff Larentowicz in 2004.

Remick also played for Worcester Hydra in the USL Premier Development League.

=== Professional ===
On January 17, 2013, Remick was selected in the second round of the MLS SuperDraft (35th overall) by Seattle Sounders FC. Just over a month later, Remick signed a professional contract with the Sounders prior to the start of the 2013 season.

On May 29, 2013, Remick made his professional debut for the Sounders in a 1–0 defeat to NASL side Tampa Bay Rowdies in the third round of the Lamar Hunt U.S. Open Cup.

On December 12, 2016, the Sounders declined Remick's contract option for the 2017 season.

On December 16, 2016, Remick was selected by Houston Dynamo in the Re-Entry Draft Stage 1. He scored his first career MLS goal on April 1, 2017, a headed shot against the New York Red Bulls in his second start for the Dynamo. On June 14, Remick scored once to help Houston to a 3–2 win over North Carolina FC in a US Open Cup match. In the 2017 MLS Cup Playoffs, Remick scored against the Portland Timbers in the second leg of the conference semifinals to tie the match and give Houston the lead on away goals. Houston would go on to win 2–1 and advance to the Western Conference Finals, where they ultimately lost to the Sounders.

Remick missed the 2018 season after suffering a concussion in preseason. His contract option was declined by the Dynamo in November and Remick announced his retirement from professional soccer on December 2, 2018.

== Personal life ==
Remick was born and raised in Inverness, Illinois, near Chicago. With his twin brother Spencer, he ran in the 1,600-meter relay team at Loyola Academy. While Dylan chose to pursue soccer, Spencer instead became a track runner at the University of Southern California. As of May ‘25, he is married to Mia Cleary, the tallest of the three Cleary sisters.

== Career statistics ==
Appearances and goals by club, season and competition
Club	Season	League			U.S. Open Cup		MLS Playoffs		CONCACAF Champions League		Total	
Club	Season	Division	Apps	Goals	Apps	Goals	Apps	Goals	Apps	Goals	Apps	Goals
Worcester Hydra	2012	USL Premier Development League	4	1	—		—		—		4	1
Seattle Sounders FC	2013	Major League Soccer	1	0	1	0	0	0	0	0	2	0
Seattle Sounders FC	2014	Major League Soccer	13	0	0	0	0	0	—		13	0
Seattle Sounders FC	2015	Major League Soccer	19	0	1	0	0	0	3	0	23	0
Seattle Sounders FC	2016	Major League Soccer	11	0	3	0	0	0	0	0	14	0
Seattle Sounders FC	Total		44	0	5	0	0	0	3	0	52	0
Seattle Sounders 2	2015	United Soccer League	1	0	0	0	—		—		1	0
Seattle Sounders 2	2016	United Soccer League	3	0	—		—		—		3	0
Seattle Sounders 2	Total		4	0	0	0	0	0	0	0	4	0
Houston Dynamo	2017	Major League Soccer	14	1	2	1	3	1	—		19	3
Houston Dynamo	2018	Major League Soccer	0	0	0	0	0	0	—		0	0
Houston Dynamo	Total		14	1	2	1	3	1	0	0	19	3
Rio Grande Valley Toros (loan)	2017	United Soccer League	1	0	—		—		—		1	0
Career total			67	2	7	1	3	1	3	0	80	4

== Honors ==
Seattle Sounders FC

- MLS Cup: 2016
- U.S. Open Cup: 2014

Houston Dynamo

- U.S. Open Cup: 2018
