= Saif Kerawala =

American soccer player (born 1997)

Personal information
- Full name: Saif Amir Kerawala
- Date of birth: June 23, 1997 (age 29)
- Place of birth: Bellevue, Washington, United States
- Height: 1.93 m (6 ft 4 in)
- Position: Goalkeeper

Team information
- Current team: Washington Athletic Club
- Number: 1

Youth career
- 2011–2014: Eastside FC
- 2014–2015: Seattle Sounders

College career
| Years | Team | Apps | (Gls) |
| 2015–2018 | Washington Huskies | 34 | (0) |

Senior career*
| Years | Team | Apps | (Gls) |
| 2015 | Seattle Sounders 2 | 2 | (0) |
| 2016–2019 | Tacoma Defiance | 12 | (0) |
| 2022–2024 | Crossfire Redmond | 10 | (0) |
| 2025–2026 | Washington Athletic | 1 | (0) |
- * Club domestic league appearances and goals as of August 28, 2025

Saif Amir Kerawala (Bengali: সাইফ আমির কেরাওয়ালা, pronounced [saif amir kerao̯aːlaː]; born June 23, 1997) is an American retired soccer player who played as a goalkeeper.

== Early life ==
Kerawala was born in Bellevue, Washington, to a Bangladeshi father of Gujarati descent and an American mother. His paternal grandfather was born in Bombay, British India (present-day Mumbai, India), while his father was born in Khulna, East Pakistan (present-day Bangladesh).

== Career ==
=== Youth career ===
Kerawala began his career with Eastside FC (2011–2014), captaining both his club and high school teams. He then spent one season with the Seattle Sounders Academy in 2014–2015.

=== College career ===
On February 6, 2015, Kerawala signed a letter of intent to play college soccer at the University of Washington. He played for the Huskies from 2015 to 2018, serving as the primary goalkeeper in his redshirt sophomore and junior years. He recorded a 0.92 goals-against average and six shutouts in his redshirt junior season, earning Pac-12 All-Academic honorable mention.

=== Professional career ===
On May 20, 2015, he made his professional debut for Seattle Sounders 2 in a U.S. Open Cup match against Kitsap Pumas, a PDL team. S2 won 4–2 in extra time. He made his second Open Cup appearance a week later in a 2–1 victory over Portland Timbers 2 in extra time. His USL debut came on July 18, 2015, in a 1–1 draw against Colorado Springs Switchbacks. Despite appearing for S2, Kerawala maintained his college eligibility.

From 2016 to 2019, he played for Tacoma Defiance, gaining experience in the USL Championship.

Kerawala joined Crossfire Redmond from 2022 to 2024, competing in the Cascadia Premier League.

As of 2025, he plays for Washington Athletic Club, participating in the U.S. Open Cup.

He announced his retirement from professional football after not being selected for Bangladesh national team for the FIFA ASEAN Cup.

== International career ==
Kerawala was invited by head coach Thomas Dooley to join the Bangladesh national team camp ahead of the 2026 FIFA ASEAN Cup, which he subsequently joined. But he failed to make it into the main squad.
