= Lucas Cordeiro =

Brazilian footballer (born 1991)

Personal information
- Full name: Lucas dos Santos Cordeiro
- Date of birth: November 1, 1991 (age 34)
- Place of birth: Belo Horizonte, Brazil
- Height: 1.88 m (6 ft 2 in)
- Positions: Forward; attacking midfielder

College career
Years	Team	Apps	(Gls)
2011–2014	Oklahoma Wesleyan Eagles		

Senior career*
Years	Team	Apps	(Gls)
2015	Tulsa Roughnecks	20	(4)
2019	FC Wichita	1	(1)
- * Club domestic league appearances and goals as of September 7, 2015

Lucas dos Santos Cordeiro (born November 1, 1991) is a Brazilian professional footballer who plays as a forward.

== Career ==
=== Early career ===
Cordeiro played four years of college soccer at Oklahoma Wesleyan University between 2011 and 2014. In four years with the Eagles, he tallied 48 goals and 51 assists.

=== Professional ===
Cordeiro signed with United Soccer League club Tulsa Roughnecks in March 2015.

On June 23, 2019, Cordeiro made his National Premier Soccer League debut for FC Wichita. He scored a goal in the 85th minute.
