= Aaron Kovar =

American soccer player (born 1993)

Personal information
- Date of birth: August 14, 1993 (age 33)
- Place of birth: Seattle, Washington, U.S.
- Height: 1.78 m (5 ft 10 in)
- Position: Midfielder

Youth career
- 2009–2010: Emerald City FC
- 2010–2012: Seattle Sounders FC

College career
Years	Team	Apps	(Gls)
2012–2013	Stanford Cardinal	36	(5)

Senior career*
Years	Team	Apps	(Gls)
2013	Seattle Sounders FC U-23	5	(0)
2014–2018	Seattle Sounders FC	32	(1)
2014	→ Orange County Blues (loan)	2	(0)
2015	→ Seattle Sounders FC 2 (loan)	17	(1)
2016	→ Seattle Sounders FC 2 (loan)	3	(1)
2017	→ Seattle Sounders FC 2 (loan)	3	(0)
2018	→ Los Angeles FC (loan)	11	(0)
- * Club domestic league appearances and goals as of November 3, 2018

Aaron Kovar (born August 14, 1993) is an American former professional soccer player who played as a midfielder.

== Career ==
=== Early career ===
Kovar was part of Emerald City FC from 2009 to 2010, and then the Seattle Sounders FC Academy between 2010 and 2012, before moving to Stanford University, where he played college soccer for two years. In 2013, Kovar also appeared for Seattle Sounders FC U-23 in the USL PDL.

=== Seattle Sounders FC ===
On January 9, 2014, it was announced that Kovar, along with fellow academy teammate Sean Okoli, had signed a professional contract with the Seattle Sounders FC through the Homegrown Player Rule.

Kovar was loaned to USL Pro club Orange County Blues on June 10, 2014.

In January 2017, Kovar went on trial at English side Coventry City.

=== Los Angeles FC ===
On January 23, 2018, Kovar was loaned by Seattle to MLS expansion side Los Angeles FC for the 2018 season. On May 22, 2018, he scored his first goal for the club in a friendly against Borussia Dortmund in the 77th minute.

== Personal life ==
Kovar is of Irish descent, and holds an Irish passport.
