= Andrés Correa =

Colombian footballer (born 1994)

Personal information
- Full name: Andrés Correa Valencia
- Date of birth: 29 January 1994 (age 32)
- Place of birth: Envigado, Colombia
- Height: 1.75 m (5 ft 9 in)
- Position: Left back

Team information
- Current team: Deportivo Cali
- Number: 3

Youth career
- Independiente Medellín

Senior career*
Years	Team	Apps	(Gls)
2011–2014	Independiente Medellín	10	(0)
2014	→ Fortaleza (loan)	7	(0)
2015	Seattle Sounders FC	0	(0)
2015	→ Seattle Sounders 2 (loan)	16	(0)
2016–2017	Boyacá Chicó	31	(1)
2017–2025	La Equidad	239	(1)
2025–	Deportivo Cali	16	(1)

International career
2011	Colombia U17	9	(0)
2013	Colombia U20	8	(0)
- * Club domestic league appearances and goals as of 12 December 2025

Andrés Correa Valencia (born 29 January 1994) is a Colombian footballer who plays as a left back for Deportivo Cali.

== Career ==
On 10 February 2015, Correa signed with MLS club Seattle Sounders FC. In December 2015, Seattle declined its contract option on Correa.

== Career statistics ==
Club	Division	League			Cup		Continental		Total	
Club	Division	Season	Apps	Goals	Apps	Goals	Apps	Goals	Apps	Goals
Independiente Medellín	Categoría Primera A	2011	0	0	1	0	-		1	0
Independiente Medellín	Categoría Primera A	2012	4	0	4	0	-		8	0
Independiente Medellín	Categoría Primera A	2013	0	0	3	0	-		3	0
Independiente Medellín	Categoría Primera A	2014	6	0	-		-		6	0
Independiente Medellín	Total		10	0	8	0	0	0	18	0
Fortaleza	Categoría Primera A	2014	7	0	-		-		7	0
Seattle Sounders FC	Major League Soccer	2015	0	0	-		0	0	0	0
Seattle Sounders 2	USL Championship	2015	17	0	-		-		17	0
Boyacá Chicó	Categoría Primera A	2016	31	1	1	0	-		32	1
La Equidad	Categoría Primera A	2017	40	0	1	0	-		41	0
La Equidad	Categoría Primera A	2018	18	0	2	0	-		20	0
La Equidad	Categoría Primera A	2019	9	0	-		2	0	11	0
La Equidad	Categoría Primera A	2020	10	0	2	0	-		12	0
La Equidad	Categoría Primera A	2021	28	0	1	0	7	0	36	0
La Equidad	Categoría Primera A	2022	42	0	1	0	1	0	44	0
La Equidad	Categoría Primera A	2023	33	1	2	0	-		35	1
La Equidad	Categoría Primera A	2024	41	0	2	0	-		43	0
La Equidad	Categoría Primera A	2025	2	0	-		-		2	0
La Equidad	Total		254	1	11	0	10	0	275	1
Career Total			288	2	20	0	10	0	318	2
