= Sam Garza =

American soccer player (born 1989)

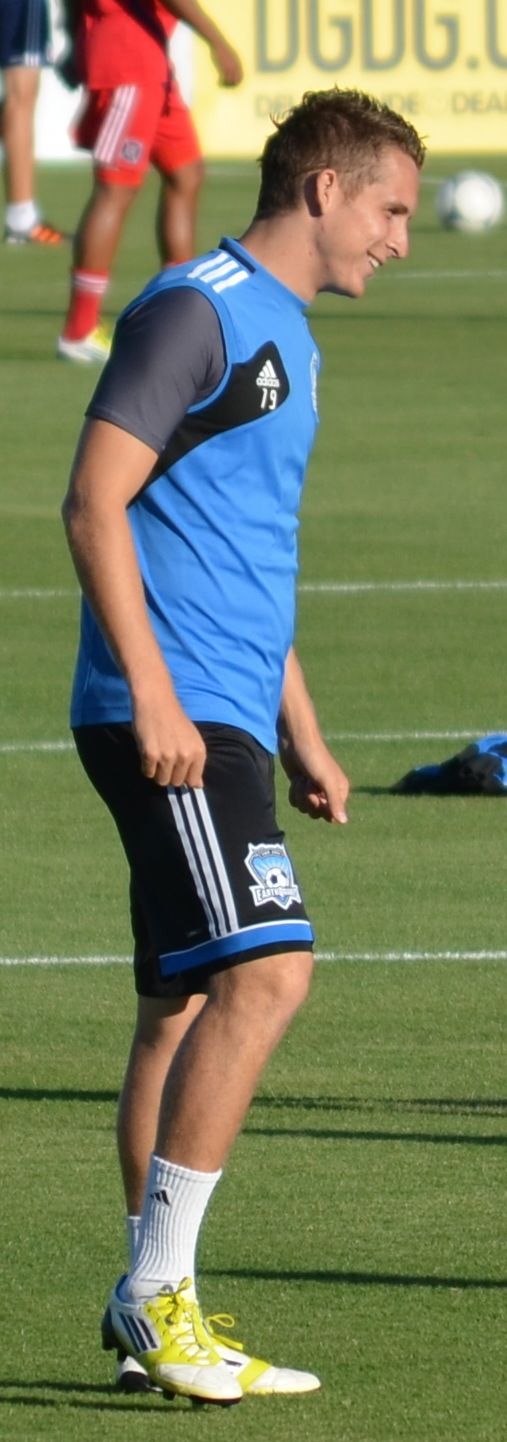
- Garza warming up prior to a game at Buck Shaw Stadium, July 2012

Personal information
- Full name: Samuel Cruz Garza
- Date of birth: October 17, 1989 (age 37)
- Place of birth: Carrollton, Texas, United States
- Height: 5 ft 11 in (1.80 m)
- Position: Forward

Team information
- Current team: Denton Diablos FC

Youth career
- 2005–2008: Edward S. Marcus High School

College career
Years	Team	Apps	(Gls)
2008–2009	Denver Pioneers	20	(4)
2010–2011	UC Santa Barbara Gauchos	44	(17)

Senior career*
Years	Team	Apps	(Gls)
2012–2014	San Jose Earthquakes	12	(0)
2014	→ San Antonio Scorpions (loan)	2	(0)
2014	Arizona United SC	9	(1)
2015	Seattle Sounders FC 2	23	(4)
2016	Arizona United SC	23	(2)
2019–	Denton Diablos FC	9	(8)

International career^{‡}
2008–2009	United States U20	7	(1)
Medal record
Representing United States
Runner-up	CONCACAF U-20 Championship	2009
- * Club domestic league appearances and goals as of August 25, 2019 ‡ National team caps and goals as of September 28, 2016

Samuel Cruz Garza (born October 17, 1989) is an American soccer player for Denton Diablos FC in the National Premier Soccer League.

== Early life and education ==
Garza was born on October 17, 1989, in Carrollton, Texas. After his father's job moved him to New Mexico, he returned to Highland Village, Texas, to attend Edward S. Marcus High School and play on the school's varsity soccer team from 2005 to 2008. Garza would win back-to-back Texas Class 5A State titles with the team and was named as the 2008 Texas Gatorade Player of the Year and a NSCAA All-American.

Garza attended the University of Denver and played college soccer for the Denver Pioneers men's soccer team. He made 20 appearances for the Pioneers and scored 4 goals before tearing his ACL and meniscus early in his sophomore year.

Garza transferred to the University of California, Santa Barbara, joining up with the UC Santa Barbara Gauchos men's soccer team ahead of the 2010 season. He was the first United States U20 team player to join the Gauchos. In his two years at UCSB, Garza made 44 appearances, scoring 17 goals and assisting on 10 others.

== Playing career ==
=== San Jose Earthquakes ===
Following his junior year, Garza was signed by Major League Soccer to a Generation Adidas contract and forwent playing his senior season at UCSB. He was drafted in the first round, sixth overall, by San Jose Earthquakes in the 2012 MLS SuperDraft, two spots behind Gaucho teammate Luis Silva.

=== San Antonio and Arizona ===
In February 2014, San Jose sent Garza on loan to North American Soccer League side San Antonio Scorpions. Garza, on his loan to San Antonio, stated "When I got loaned to San Antonio Scorpions, it was one of the worst times of my life. I was not enjoying my football." He would make 2 appearances for the club before San Jose waived him in July 2014.

Garza joined USL PRO side Arizona United SC for the remainder of the 2014 season. He appeared in 9 games, scoring once. While playing for Arizona United, he caught the attention of Ezra Hendrickson and a conversation with Sigi Schmid ensued, leading Garza to Seattle. At the conclusion of the season, Garza returned home to Texas and set forth a career in coaching and teaching at Marcus High School, becoming the school's varsity head coach in 2019.

=== Seattle Sounders FC 2 ===
Following his conversations at the end of the prior season, Garza went on trial with Seattle Sounders FC 2 of the United Soccer League in February 2015. His trial was successful and he signed with the club in March 2015. He appeared in 23 games, adding 4 goals and 2 assists, but he was not retained for the following season.

=== Return to Arizona ===
Arizona United re-signed Garza in February 2016 for the 2016 USL season. In November 2016, Garza was named as the head coach for the Marcus Marauders Football Club (MMFC), the Boys Soccer team at his alma mater Edward S. Marcus High School, in Flower Mound, Texas.

== International career ==
Garza was a member of the United States men's national under-20 soccer team from 2008 to 2009. His first game was December 20, 2008, against Haiti U20 and he scored his first U20 goal against the Canada U20 team just days later on December 22. He later represented his country at the 2009 CONCACAF U-20 Championship. Garza was named to the U-20 team by Thomas Rongen for the 2009 FIFA U-20 World Cup, but had to be replaced due to his knee injury suffered with Denver Pioneers. He made a total of 7 appearances with 1 goal for the U20 side.
