= Oniel Fisher =

Jamaican footballer (born 1991)

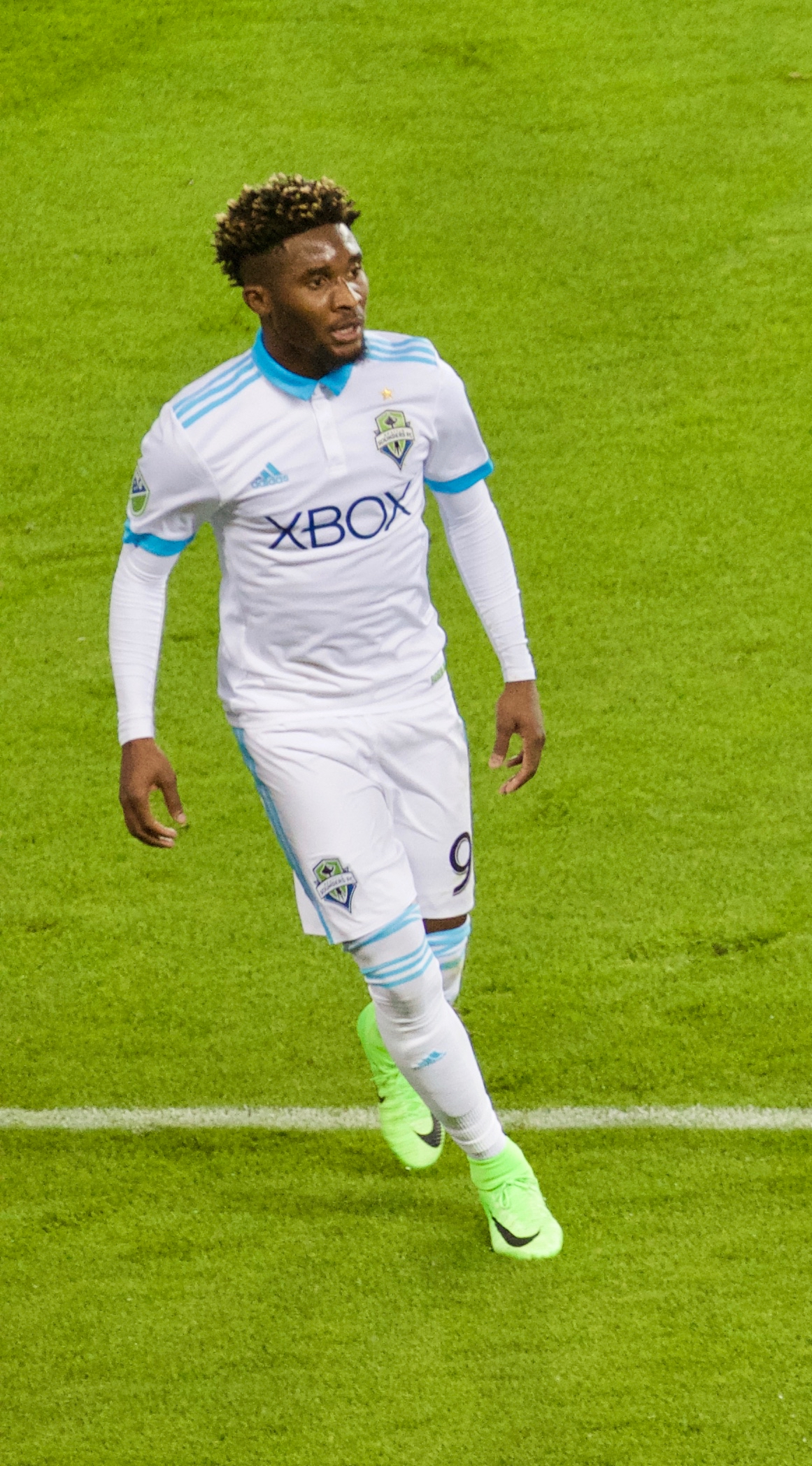
- Fisher with Seattle Sounders FC in 2016

Personal information
- Full name: Oniel David Fisher
- Date of birth: 22 November 1991 (age 34)
- Place of birth: Portmore, Jamaica
- Height: 1.75 m (5 ft 9 in)
- Positions: Right-back; midfielder

Youth career
- 2009–2011: St. George's

College career
Years	Team	Apps	(Gls)
2011–2012	TJC Apaches	20	(6)
2013–2014	New Mexico Lobos	39	(3)

Senior career*
Years	Team	Apps	(Gls)
2012	Jersey Express	1	(0)
2013–2014	New York Red Bulls U-23		
2015–2017	Seattle Sounders FC	27	(0)
2015–2016	→ Seattle Sounders FC 2	23	(0)
2018–2020	D.C. United	39	(1)
2021	LA Galaxy	12	(0)
2022	Minnesota United FC	11	(0)
2022	Minnesota United FC 2	4	(0)
2023	Detroit City	20	(0)

International career^{‡}
2010–2011	Jamaica U20	5	(0)
2010–	Jamaica	26	(1)
Medal record
Men's football
Representing Jamaica
CONCACAF Gold Cup
Runner-up	2017 United States	Team
- * Club domestic league appearances and goals as of 22:45, 19 October 2023 (UTC) ‡ National team caps and goals as of 8:19, 1 November 2026 (UTC)

Oniel David Fisher (born 22 November 1991) is a Jamaican professional footballer who plays as a right-back and midfielder for the Jamaica national team.

== Club career ==
=== Youth, college and amateur ===
Fisher spent his youth career with St. George's College in Jamaica before moving to the U.S. to play college soccer at Tyler Junior College. In his two seasons with the Apaches, he made a total of 20 appearances and tallied six goals and three assists.

In 2013, Fisher transferred to the University of New Mexico, making him Lobo Soccer's first-ever Jamaican student-athlete. In his two seasons with the Lobos, he made a total of 29 appearances and tallied four goals and three assists and helped lead them to the College Cup semifinals in 2013.

Fisher also played in the Premier Development League for Jersey Express and in the National Premier Soccer League for New York Red Bulls U-23.

=== Seattle Sounders FC ===
On 15 January 2015, Fisher was selected in the second round (40th overall) in the 2015 MLS SuperDraft by Seattle Sounders FC and signed a professional contract with the club two months later. On 21 March, he made his professional debut for USL affiliate club Seattle Sounders FC 2 in a 4–2 victory over defending USL champion Sacramento Republic FC. He made his MLS debut the following week in a goalless draw away to FC Dallas.

=== D.C. United ===
Fisher was traded to D.C. United ahead of the 2018 season. He made his debut for D.C. United against Orlando City SC on 3 March 2018. On 15 August 2018, he scored his first goal for the team in the 47th minute in the 4–1 victory against the Portland Timbers. Fisher sustained a knee injury during a game against Montreal Impact on 29 September 2018 and was out for the rest of the season and is not expected to return to the field until 3 November 2019. On 30 January 2019, D.C. United re-signed Fisher after having his option declined after the 2018 season. Fisher missed the entire 2019 season due to his injury.

He returned from his injury on 7 March 2020, entering the game against Inter Miami CF.

He was released by D.C. United on 30 November 2020.

=== LA Galaxy ===
On 15 February 2021, Fisher joined the LA Galaxy. Following the 2021 season, Fisher was released by LA Galaxy.

=== Minnesota United ===
On 2 February 2022, Fisher signed with Minnesota United FC and made his debut in Minnesota's season opener against the Philadelphia Union on 26 February. Following the 2022 season, his contract option was declined by Minnesota.

=== Detroit City FC ===
On 29 March 2023, it was announced Fisher would be joining Detroit City FC on contract for the 2023 season with an option for 2024. He left Detroit following their 2023 season.

== International career ==
On 11 August 2010, Fisher made his international debut for Jamaica in a 3–1 victory over Trinidad and Tobago. He also played for the under-20 national team in the 2011 CONCACAF U-20 Championship.

== Personal life ==
Fisher holds a U.S. green card which qualifies him as a domestic player for MLS roster purposes.

== Career statistics ==
As of 19 March 2017

Appearances and goals by club, season and competition
Club	Season	League		Playoffs		U.S. Open Cup		Champions League		Total	
Club	Season	Apps	Goals	Apps	Goals	Apps	Goals	Apps	Goals	Apps	Goals
Seattle Sounders FC 2	2015	11	0	0	0	–		–		11	0
Seattle Sounders FC 2	2016	12	0	–		–		–		12	0
Seattle Sounders FC 2	Total	23	0	0	0	0	0	0	0	23	0
Seattle Sounders FC	2015	12	0	2	0	1	0	2	0	17	0
Seattle Sounders FC	2016	6	0	3	0	3	0	0	0	12	0
Seattle Sounders FC	2017	9	0	0	0	0	0	0	0	9	0
Seattle Sounders FC	Total	27	0	5	0	4	0	2	0	38	0
Career total		50	0	5	0	4	0	2	0	61	0

=== International goals ===
Scores and results list Jamaica's goal tally first.

Goal	Date	Venue	Opponent	Score	Result	Competition
1.	13 October 2021	Estadio Olímpico Metropolitano, San Pedro Sula, Honduras	Honduras	2–0	2–0	2022 FIFA World Cup qualification

== Honours ==
Seattle Sounders FC

- MLS Cup: 2016
