= Andy Craven =

American soccer player (born 1992)

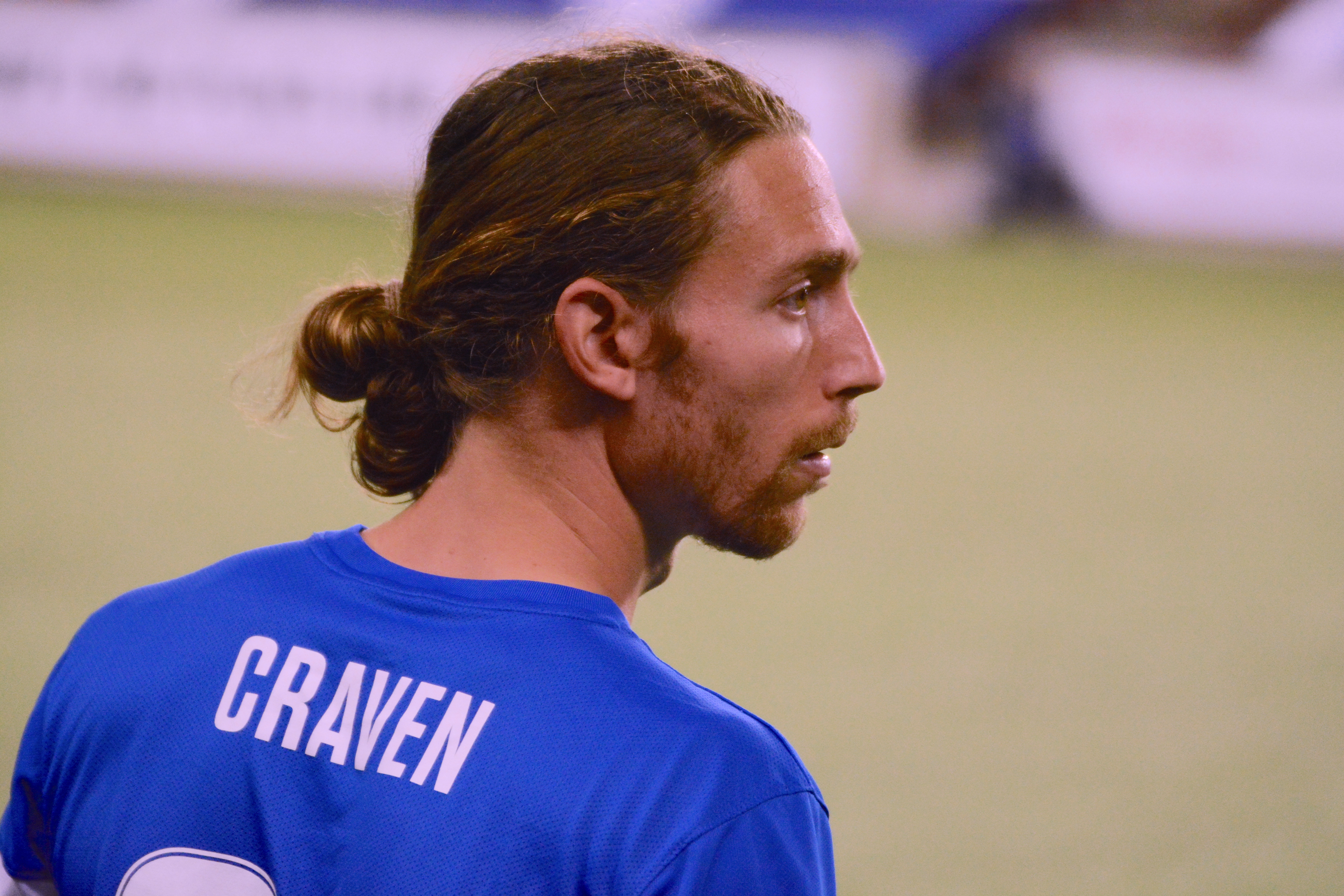
- Craven playing for FC Cincinnati in 2017

Personal information
- Full name: Andrew Murray Craven
- Date of birth: January 21, 1992 (age 34)
- Place of birth: St. Simons Island, Georgia, United States
- Height: 1.80 m (5 ft 11 in)
- Position: Forward

Youth career
- 2007–2009: IMG Academy

College career
Years	Team	Apps	(Gls)
2010–2011	Charleston Cougars	26	(10)
2012–2014	North Carolina Tar Heels	44	(21)

Senior career*
Years	Team	Apps	(Gls)
2011	Chicago Fire U-23	8	(2)
2012	Orange County Blue Star	2	(3)
2015	Seattle Sounders FC 2	14	(5)
2015–2016	Seattle Sounders FC	3	(0)
2016	→ Seattle Sounders FC 2 (loan)	16	(3)
2016	Oklahoma City Energy	10	(0)
2017	FC Cincinnati	3	(0)
2017	Oklahoma City Energy	14	(5)

International career^{‡}
2009	United States U17	6	(0)
- * Club domestic league appearances and goals as of 12:59, 21 October 2017 (UTC) ‡ National team caps and goals as of May 10, 2017

Andrew Murray Craven (born January 21, 1992) is an American soccer player.

== Career ==
=== College and amateur ===
Craven began his college career at the College of Charleston. During his freshman year he lived in the McAlister dorm. In his first season with the Cougars, he made 18 appearances and tallied four goals and one assist on his way to being named Southern Conference Freshman of the Year. In 2011, he got off to a flying start. Scoring six goals in his first eight matches before suffering a season-ending injury. He still went on to be named All-Southern Conference Second Team.

In 2012, Craven transferred to the University of North Carolina. In his first season with the Tar Heels, he made 22 appearances and tallied six goals and five assists. In 2013, he redshirted his senior year after suffering a season-ending injury during preseason. In his final year with the Tar Heels, he made 22 appearances and finished the year with 15 goals and 5 assists.

Craven also played in the Premier Development League for Chicago Fire U-23 and Orange County Blue Star.

=== Professional ===
On January 20, 2015, Craven was selected in the third round (47th overall) of the 2015 MLS SuperDraft by Seattle Sounders FC. However, he was cut from camp and would eventually sign a professional contract with USL affiliate club Seattle Sounders FC 2. He made his professional debut for the club and scored a goal in S2's 4–2 victory over Sacramento Republic FC. On June 27, 2015, Craven earned his chance to be promoted to Sounders FC First Team squad. Craven made his MLS debut for the Sounders the following day, replacing Chad Barrett in the 60th minute of the Sounders 4–1 defeat to the Portland Timbers.

Craven was acquired by FC Cincinnati in January 2017, but after only 3 appearances, he was traded to Oklahoma City Energy FC on May 10.

=== International ===
Craven was a member of the U.S. under-17 national team at the 2009 FIFA U-17 World Cup.
