= Pablo Rossi =

Argentine footballer

Personal information
- Full name: Pablo Rossi
- Date of birth: 5 April 1992 (age 34)
- Place of birth: Rosario, Santa Fe, Argentina
- Height: 1.83 m (6 ft 0 in)
- Position: Midfielder

Team information
- Current team: Deportivo Pereira
- Number: 10

Senior career*
Years	Team	Apps	(Gls)
2012–2013	Atlético de Rafaela	0	(0)
2015	Seattle Sounders FC 2	27	(8)
2016	Comerciantes Unidos	0	(0)
2017	Deportivo Pereira	26	(3)
- * Club domestic league appearances and goals as of 2 January 2018

Pablo Rossi (born 5 April 1992) is an Argentine footballer who plays as a midfielder for Deportivo Pereira.

== Career ==
=== Professional ===
Rossi began his career in the youth system of Atlético de Rafaela. In 2012, he was an unused substitute in a Copa Argentina game against Banfield, a 2–0 win for Atlético de Rafaela. The following year, he was also an unused substitute in another Copa Argentina game against eventual champions, San Lorenzo de Almagro.

On 20 March 2015, following a successful trial period, Rossi signed a professional contract with USL club Seattle Sounders FC 2. He made his professional debut that same day in a 4–2 victory over Sacramento Republic FC, scoring once from a free-kick and assisting another.

In 2017, Rossi signed a contract with Deportivo Pereira to play in the Categoría Primera B.
