= Darwin Jones (soccer) =

American soccer player

Personal information
- Full name: Darwin L. Jones
- Date of birth: April 4, 1992 (age 34)
- Place of birth: Chicago, Illinois, United States
- Height: 1.78 m (5 ft 10 in)
- Position: Forward

Youth career
- 2008–2010: Washington Premier FC
- 2010–2011: Seattle Sounders FC

College career
Years	Team	Apps	(Gls)
2011	Highline CC Thunderbirds	15	(15)
2013–2014	Washington Huskies	37	(15)

Senior career*
Years	Team	Apps	(Gls)
2012–2013	Seattle Sounders FC U-23	10	(4)
2015–2016	Seattle Sounders FC	11	(0)
2015–2016	→ Seattle Sounders FC 2 (loan)	33	(12)
2017	Tampa Bay Rowdies	23	(1)
2018	IFK Värnamo	5	(0)
2018–2021	Orange County SC	64	(15)
- * Club domestic league appearances and goals as of November 8, 2021

Darwin L. Jones (born April 4, 1992) is an American soccer player.

== Career ==
=== Youth, college and amateur ===
Jones spent his youth career with Washington Premier FC and the Seattle Sounders FC Academy before beginning his college career at Highline College. In his only season with the Thunderbirds, Jones tallied 15 goals and 10 assists and led the team to the semifinals of the NWAC.

On February 6, 2012, it was announced that Jones transferred to the University of Washington. However, on August 26, it was reported that Jones did not meet the state of Washington's Direct Transfer Agreement and would not play for the Huskies in 2012. He would join the Huskies in 2013 and in his two seasons with the team, he made a total of 37 appearances and tallied 15 goals and nine assists and helped lead the Huskies to a Pac-12 title in 2013. He was also named First Team All-Pac-12 in back to back seasons.

Jones also played in the Premier Development League for Seattle Sounders FC U-23.

=== Professional ===
On January 9, 2015, Jones signed a homegrown player contract with Seattle Sounders FC, making him the fifth homegrown signing in club history. On March 21, he made his professional debut for USL affiliate club Seattle Sounders FC 2 in a 4–2 victory over defending USL champion Sacramento Republic FC. He made his first professional start the following week and netted his first career hat-trick in a 4–0 victory over Whitecaps FC 2. Jones made his MLS debut on May 16 against Vancouver Whitecaps FC.

In April 2018, Jones moved to IFK Värnamo in Superettan.

In July 2018, Jones joined Orange County SC in USL Championship.
