= Tacoma Defiance =

American soccer team based in Tacoma, Washington

- Nickname: Defiance
- Founded: October 14, 2014; 12 years ago (as Seattle Sounders FC 2)
- Stadium: Starfire Sports Complex
- Capacity: 4,500
- Owner: Seattle Sounders FC
- Head coach: Paulo Nagamura
- League: MLS Next Pro
- 2025: 12th, Western Conference; Playoffs: DNQ
- Website: www.tacdefiance.com
Home colors	Away colors

The Tacoma Defiance, formerly Seattle Sounders FC 2, is an American professional soccer team based in the Puget Sound region in Tukwila, Washington, United States. The team competes in MLS Next Pro, a league in the third tier of the United States soccer league system, as the reserve team of Seattle Sounders FC. Formerly, 20 percent of the club was fan-owned through the non-profit Sounders Community Trust.

The club was established in 2014 as Seattle Sounders FC 2 (S2) and originally played at Starfire Sports in Tukwila. The team moved to Tacoma's Cheney Stadium in 2018 and was rebranded as the Defiance the following season. The club operates out of the Sounders headquarters and training facility at Longacres in Renton, Washington.

== History ==
Seattle Sounders FC announced the creation of their reserve team on October 14, 2014, at an event held at the Chihuly Garden and Glass museum in Seattle. The new team would be named Seattle Sounders FC 2 (shortened to S2) and play in USL Pro, the second tier of American soccer that the Sounders played in until 2009. S2's home matches were to be played at the MLS team's training facility, the Starfire Sports Complex in Tukwila, beginning in the 2015 season. The Sounders intended to primarily use the team to develop young players and split ownership to a non-profit, fan-owned organization called the Sounders Community Trust. A similar reserve team for the Portland Timbers, T2, was also announced on the same day. Sounders assistant coach Ezra Hendrickson was named the team's coach on November 13, 2014.

=== Inaugural season ===
S2 played its inaugural match on March 21, 2015, winning 4–2 over the defending USL champion Sacramento Republic. Andy Craven notched the first goal in team history. Their second game yielded the team's first shutout, a home game against Whitecaps FC 2 that ended 4–0. Darwin Jones scored the team's first hat-trick during the game.

=== Tacoma relocation ===
The owners of the Tacoma Rainiers baseball team had expressed interest in hosting a lower-division soccer team at its ballpark, Cheney Stadium, or a separate soccer stadium as early as 2013. Cheney Field hosted an MLS Reserve League match between the Sounders and Orlando City SC reserve teams in May 2013, which brought an attendance of 2,174. The Rainiers partnered with the Tacoma Stars, an indoor soccer team, and discussed a potential move for S2 with the Sounders organization. The Sounders had previously discussed plans to move their lower-league franchise to the Tacoma area in the 2000s in the event of a successful MLS expansion bid.

On May 6, 2017, the Sounders and Rainiers announced that they had agreed to relocate the reserve team to Tacoma upon completion of a new, 5,000-seat soccer-specific stadium by 2020. After the USL announced its intention to refuse waivers for teams with smaller venues that did not meet full Division II requirements, the Sounders announced in November 2017 that S2 would temporarily play at Cheney Stadium in Tacoma beginning in the 2018 season. The team had previously played in front of crowds of less than 1,000 at Starfire Sports, but debuted at Cheney Stadium with a sellout crowd of 6,049 on March 16, 2018. The team failed to qualify for the USL playoffs, but the first season in Tacoma garnered an average attendance of over 3,000.

The club was re-branded as the Tacoma Defiance on January 30, 2019, following a campaign to solicit suggestions from the public for a new name. The Defiance name was the top choice in the poll and references Point Defiance Park and Tacoma's civic pride. MultiCare Health System was named as the team's jersey sponsor and Reign FC of the National Women's Soccer League also announced a move to Cheney Stadium for the 2019 season. Sounders FC Academy Director Chris Little had been named as the team's new head coach a week earlier, replacing John Hutchinson.

=== MLS Next Pro ===
The club announced on December 6, 2021, that it was joining the inaugural 21-team MLS Next Pro season starting in 2022. As a result of Minor League Baseball rules rendering Cheney unavailable, and the abandonment of the Tacoma soccer stadium project, the Defiance relocated back to Starfire. A proposal to move the team to Spokane, Washington, was considered by the Sounders and a prospective local partner who ultimately chose to create a USL League One team.

== Team colors and crest ==
The former logo of S2

The Tacoma Defiance branding was unveiled on January 30, 2019, replacing the original S2 brand that was inherited from the Sounders. The name references Point Defiance Park, a major park with gardens, a zoo and aquarium complex, and several marinas. The club's crest is a black circle featuring an image of a stylized ship, based on USS Point Defiance, in the foreground and the tentacles of a Giant Pacific octopus surrounding it.

The original team colors for S2 were inherited from the first team, including the Sounders' trademark Rave Green. The crest was a green silhouette of the Sounders crest, itself constructed with symbolism representing the club, fans, and players, with "S2" in the center. The club continues to use the basic silhouette in their secondary mark, with "TAC" in the center to represent Tacoma. A tertiary crest includes the words "Defiantly Tacoma".

== Stadium ==
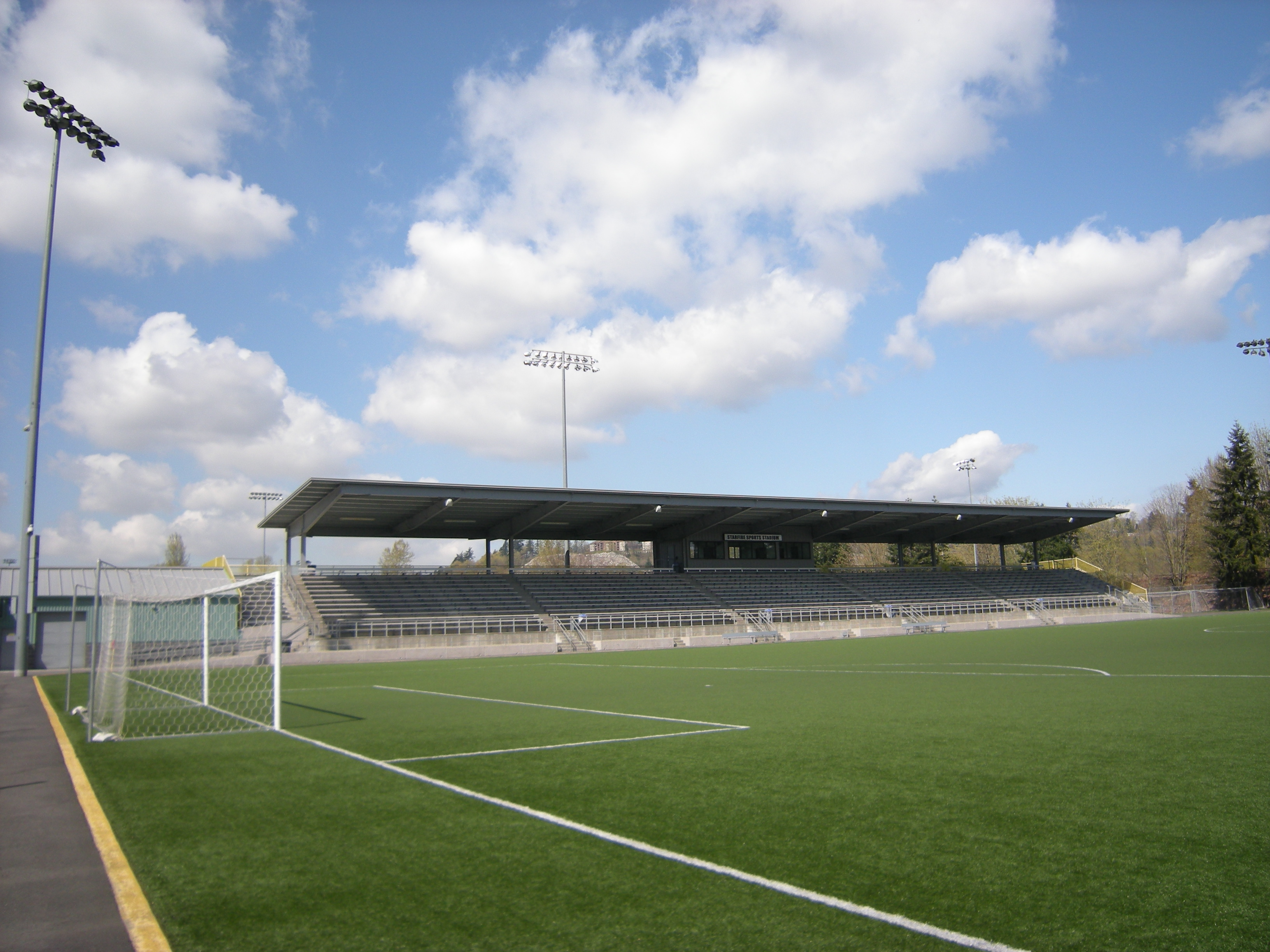
The main stadium at Starfire Sports Complex.

S2 initially played its home matches at Starfire Sports Complex's main stadium, which seats 3,500 spectators and is located in the suburb of Tukwila, Washington. The complex was also used by Seattle Sounders FC for training and non-MLS matches as well as the club's academy teams. The largest attendance for an S2 game at Starfire was 2,951, set on March 21, 2015. By the 2017 season, the team was averaging below 1,000 spectators for matches at Starfire.

In 2018, the team moved to Cheney Stadium in Tacoma, Washington, a 6,000-seat ballpark and the existing home of the minor league baseball team Tacoma Rainiers. For soccer matches, the pitch was aligned to the third base line, the pitcher's mound was removed, and the dirt infield was filled with grass. S2 would continue training at Starfire in Tukwila alongside the first team.

S2 was renamed to the Tacoma Defiance in 2019 amid plans to build a permanent soccer-specific stadium for them and the NWSL's OL Reign, who had also moved to Cheney Stadium. The stadium would seat 5,500 spectators and cost $300 million to develop on city-owned land adjacent to Cheney Stadium. The preliminary plan for the stadium complex, which would open in 2021, was approved by Metro Parks Tacoma in 2018; work on the complex was suspended in 2020 during the COVID-19 pandemic but was later expanded to a larger stadium to meet NWSL requirements. OL Reign later moved back to Lumen Field in Seattle for the 2022 season and left the stadium project.

The Defiance played all but two of their home matches in the inaugural season of MLS Next Pro at Starfire Sports in Tukwila due to a revision to minor league baseball requirements that made the conversion of Cheney Stadium for soccer matches more complicated. The team moved all of their home matches to Starfire for the 2023 season. The Defiance moved their home matches and training facilities to the new Sounders training center in Renton at Longacres in 2024.

== Ownership and team management ==
The ownership of the club is composed of two groups. The majority owner is the Sounders FC organization, with the non-profit Sounders Community Trust owning minority share of 20%. Since 2017, the business operations of the Defiance is under the management of the Tacoma Rainiers, a Triple-A baseball affiliate of the Seattle Mariners, while soccer operations are managed by the Sounders.

Andrew Opatkiewicz was hired as the General Manager in October 2014, having experience with Seattle Wolves FC (now Washington Crossfire). Retired MLS veteran defender and former Assistant Coach and Reserve team coach of Seattle Sounders FC, Ezra Hendrickson, was announced as the head coach of S2 on November 13, 2014.

Opatkiewicz took an indefinite leave of absence from the team in May 2016 and Kurt Schmid, the former Seattle Sounders FC head scout and son of then-coach Sigi Schmid, was named as S2 GM on an interim basis. Prior to the start of the 2017 USL season, Schmid was formally named the S2 GM and John Hutchinson was added as an assistant coach on Hendrickson's staff. Chris Little was named the head coach of S2 shortly before its rebranding as the Defiance in 2019. Little left the organization in February 2021 to become an assistant coach for the Colorado Rapids and was replaced by assistant Wade Webber. Webber left the position in November 2023 and was replaced two months later by Hervé Diese, a former assistant coach for CF Montreal and Angel City FC.

In February 2026, the Defiance named Paulo Nagamura as their new head coach and recently retired Sounders midfielder João Paulo as an assistant coach.

== Players ==
=== Current roster ===
As of March 17, 2026

No.	Pos.	Nation	Player
30	MF	USA	Edson Carli
32	MF	USA	Xavi Gnaulati
34	MF	USA	Danny Robles
38	DF	USA	Kevin Bonilla
40	DF	USA	Mark O'Neill
41	GK	USA	Mohammed Shour
42	MF	USA	Rafael Jauregui
43	MF	USA	Omar Hassan
45	MF	USA	Peter Kingston
46	MF	USA	Joe Dale
47	DF	USA	Demian Alvarez
48	DF	NZL	Codey Phoenix
49	FW	HON	Cris Batiz
53	DF	USA	Gallatin Sanders
55	MF	CRC	Jared Ríos
58	DF	USA	Jasper Winslow
59	MF	JAM	Matthew Bell
78	MF	USA	Joseph Dale
80	DF	USA	Drew Brown
81	FW	USA	Mark Bronnik
84	MF	USA	Charlie Gaffney
97	MF	JPN	Saku Kitafuji

Seattle Sounders FC loan player
Seattle Sounders FC academy player

=== Technical staff ===
As of January 15, 2024

Coaching staff
Head coach	Paulo Nagamura
Assistant coach	João Paulo

=== Head coaches ===
As of 2023 season

Statistics include the regular season and playoffs in the USL Championship and MLS Next Pro.

Coach	Nationality	Start	End	Games	Win	Loss	Draw	Win %
Ezra Hendrickson	Saint Vincent and the Grenadines	November 13, 2014	January 30, 2018	94	33	46	15	35.11
John Hutchinson	Malta	January 30, 2018	January 23, 2019	34	6	21	7	17.65
Chris Little	Scotland	January 23, 2019	February 26, 2021	50	12	29	9	24.00
Wade Webber	United States	February 26, 2021	November 20, 2023	78	39	30	9	50.00

== Statistics ==
=== Most points ===
The following players are the club's top point leaders.
As of October 13, 2018

Rank	Name	Goals^{[A]}	Assists	Points
1	(United States) Zach Mathers	14	9	37
2	(United States) Darwin Jones	12	2	26
3	(United States) Andy Craven	8	7	23
3	(Mexico) David Estrada	11	1	23
5	(United States) Irvin Parra	7	7	21
6	(Cameroon) Felix Chenkam	9	1	19
7	(Argentina) Pablo Rossi	8	2	18
8	(Saint Vincent and the Grenadines) Myron Samuel	5	5	15
9	(United States) Ray Saari	4	6	14
10	(United States) Victor Mansaray	5	3	13

Bolded players are currently on the Sounders FC 2 roster.
^{A} Two points awarded per goal.

== Record ==
Year by Year

Year	Division	League	Regular season W–T–L	Playoffs	U.S. Open Cup	Avg. attendance
**Seattle Sounders FC 2**
2015	3	USL	6th, Western: 13–3–12	Conference 1st Round	4th Round	2,045
2016	3	USL	12th, Western: 9–8–13	did not qualify	Not eligible (MLS Reserve Team)	1,401
2017	2	USL	12th, Western: 9–4–19	did not qualify	Not eligible (MLS Reserve Team)	1,033
2018	2	USL	16th, Western: 6–7–21	did not qualify	Not eligible (MLS Reserve Team)	3,370
**Tacoma Defiance**
2019	2	USLC	17th, Western: 8–7–19	did not qualify	Not eligible (MLS Reserve Team)	2,636
2020	2	USLC	12th, Western: 4–10–2; 3rd, Group A	did not qualify	Not eligible (MLS Reserve Team)	N/A
2021	2	USLC	5th, Western: 10–13–9	did not qualify	Not eligible (MLS Reserve Team)	1,105
2022	3	MLSNP	2nd, Western: 14–4–6	Conference Final	Not eligible (MLS Reserve Team)	N/A
