= 2016 Seattle Sounders FC 2 season =

Seattle Sounders FC 2
2016 season
- General manager: Andrew Opatkiewicz
- Head coach: Ezra Hendrickson
- Stadium: Starfire Sports Complex
- USL: Conference: 12th
- USL Playoffs: DNQ
- Top goalscorer: Darwin Jones (7)
- Highest home attendance: 1,835
- Lowest home attendance: 1,182
- Average home league attendance: 1,401
Home colors	Away colors	Third colors

The 2016 Seattle Sounders FC 2 season was the club's second year of existence, and their second season in the United Soccer League, the third tier of the United States soccer pyramid. Including previous Seattle Sounders franchises, it was the 36th season of a soccer team playing in the Seattle metro area.

== Roster ==
Note: Flags indicate national team as defined under FIFA eligibility rules; some limited exceptions apply. Players may hold more than one non-FIFA nationality. Squad correct as of June 16, 2016.

No.	Pos.	Nation	Player
1	GK	USA	Tyler Miller
11	MF	USA	Aaron Kovar
12	MF	USA	Michael Farfan
15	DF	USA	Dylan Remick
17	FW	USA	Darwin Jones
18	MF	USA	Nathan Sturgis
22	GK	USA	Charlie Lyon
25	DF	MEX	Tony Alfaro
30	MF	GAM	Amadou Sanyang
32	MF	USA	Zach Mathers
34	MF	USA	Jordan Schweitzer
35	DF	CMR	Nouhou Tolo
36	DF	USA	Michael Nelson
39	FW	VIN	Oalex Anderson
40	DF	USA	Nick Hinds
41	MF	USA	Lorenzo Ramos
42	FW	KEN	Handwalla Bwana
45	FW	USA	Harrison Kurtz
50	DF	USA	Tobi Jnohope
51	DF	SEN	Hadid Barry
52	DF	USA	Henry Baldwin
53	MF	JPN	Kei Tomozawa
54	FW	ENG	Milo Barton
70	DF	CAN	Brandon John
77	MF	MTQ	Jordy Delem
80	FW	USA	Victor Mansaray
81	DF	USA	Devon Fisher
88	MF	BIH	Emir Alihodžić
90	MF	CMR	Mark O'Ojong
91	DF	JAM	Oniel Fisher
92	MF	CMR	Willy Kapawa
95	MF	COL	Carlos Patino
97	FW	VIN	Myron Samuel
98	GK	USA	Matt Bersano
—	DF	USA	Jake Morris
—	MF	USA	Jamie Dimitroff
—	MF	USA	George Armstrong
—	FW	USA	Shandon Hopeau
—	MF	USA	John Magnus
—	GK	USA	John David Muse
—	MF	USA	Irvin Parra
—	MF	ANT	Gregory Sutton

== Competitions ==
=== USL regular season ===
==== Standings ====
Pos	Team	Pld	W	D	L	GF	GA	GD	Pts
10	San Antonio FC	30	10	8	12	36	36	0	38
11	Real Monarchs	30	10	6	14	31	41	−10	36
12	Seattle Sounders 2	30	9	8	13	35	50	−15	35
13	Arizona United	30	9	7	14	40	46	−6	34
14	Saint Louis FC	30	8	10	12	42	44	−2	34

Source: 2016 USL Standings
Rules for classification: 1) total wins; 2) total goal differential; 3) total goals scored; 4) points earned against top four Conference finishers; 5) disciplinary points; 6) coin toss or drawing of lots

==== Results summary ====
Overall								Home						Away					
Pld	W	D	L	GF	GA	GD	Pts	W	D	L	GF	GA	GD	W	D	L	GF	GA	GD
30	9	8	13	35	50	−15	35	7	3	5	20	20	0	2	5	8	15	30	−15

Last updated: September 24, 2016.

==== Matches ====
Win Draw Loss Upcoming fixture

March 25, 2016 USL 1	Seattle Sounders FC 2	0–1	Sacramento Republic FC	Tukwila, Washington
19:30 (PDT)		Report	Cazarez (yellow card) 60'; Stewart 63' (pen.); Thompson (yellow card) 67'	Stadium: Starfire Sports Complex; Attendance: 1,277; Referee: Baboucarr Jallow

March 30, 2016 USL 2	Seattle Sounders FC 2	0–2	Arizona United SC	Tukwila, Washington
19:30 (PDT)	O'Ojong (yellow card) 78'; Mathers (yellow card) 89'	Report	Bardsley 15'; Cortez 24'; Granger (yellow card) 42'; Antúnez (yellow card) 49'; Gavin (yellow card) 53'; Costa (yellow card) 90'; Cuevas (yellow card) 90'	Stadium: Starfire Sports Complex

April 3, 2016 USL 3	Seattle Sounders FC 2	0–3	San Antonio FC	Tukwila, Washington
17:00 (PDT)	O'Ojong (yellow card) 34'	Report	Johnson 2', 9'; Okiomah 78'; Chin (yellow card) 78'	Stadium: Starfire Sports Complex; Referee: Chipalo Street

April 12, 2016 USL 4	Seattle Sounders FC 2	2–2	Rio Grande Valley FC Toros	Tukwila, Washington
19:30 (PDT)	Mansaray 20'; O'Ojong (yellow card) 33'; Sturgis (yellow card) 45'; Farfan (yellow card) 75'; Alfaro 84'	Report	Malki 50' (yellow card) 60'; García 53'	Stadium: Starfire Sports Complex; Referee: Farhad Dadkho

April 17, 2016 USL 5	Seattle Sounders FC 2	1–0	Colorado Springs Switchbacks FC	Tukwila, Washington
19:00 (PDT)	Alfaro (yellow card) 15'; Kovar 28'; Fisher (yellow card) 85'	Report	Gonzalez (yellow card) 60'	Stadium: Starfire Sports Complex

April 26, 2016 USL 6	Real Monarchs	0–0	Seattle Sounders FC 2	Sandy, Utah
18:00 (PDT)	Tolo (yellow card); Samuel (yellow card)	Report		Stadium: Rio Tinto Stadium; Attendance: 1,650

May 1, 2016 USL 7	Seattle Sounders FC 2	1–1	Oklahoma City Energy FC	Tukwila, Washington
19:00 (PDT)	Mansaray 20' (yellow card) 71'; Schweitzer (yellow card) 62'; Fisher (yellow card) 78' (yellow-red card) 81'	Report	Dalgaard (yellow card) 56'; Craft (yellow card) 59'; Rideout (yellow card) 90' (goal) 90+5'	Stadium: Starfire Sports Complex

May 8, 2016 USL 8	Seattle Sounders FC 2	1–2	Tulsa Roughnecks FC	Tukwila, Washington
19:00 (PDT)	Anderson 18'	Report	Cennerazzo (yellow card) 21'; Menhebo (yellow card) 24'; Ochoa 8', 35' (yellow card) 39'; Peters (yellow card) 69'; MacLeod (yellow card) 72'	Stadium: Starfire Sports Complex

May 14, 2016 USL 9	Sacramento Republic FC	2–0	Seattle Sounders FC 2	Sacramento, California
19:30 (PDT)	Thompson 32', 46'; Guzmán (yellow card) 33'; Christian (yellow card) 35'	Report		Stadium: Bonney Field; Attendance: 11,569

May 22, 2016 USL 10	Seattle Sounders FC 2	1–1	LA Galaxy II	Tukwila, Washington
17:00 (PDT)	Romney 81'	Report	O'Ojong 43'; Covarrubias (yellow card) 19' (yellow-red card) 26'	Stadium: Starfire Sports Complex; Attendance: 1,831; Referee: Rosendo Mendoza

May 26, 2016 USL 11	Portland Timbers 2	1–0	Seattle Sounders FC 2	Portland, Oregon
19:00 (PDT)	Bijev 25'	Report		Stadium: Providence Park; Attendance: 3,627

June 4, 2016 USL 12	Orange County Blues FC	5–2	Seattle Sounders FC 2	Irvine, California
19:00 (PDT)	Ajeakwa 60'; Popara 64'; Griffiths 71'; Meeus 86' (pen.); Baccielo 90+4'	Report	Craven 48', 56' (pen.); Tolo (yellow card) 70'; Schweitzer (red card) 62'	Stadium: Anteater Stadium

June 9, 2016 USL 13	Seattle Sounders FC 2	3–2	Whitecaps FC 2	Tukwila, Washington
19:30 (PDT)	Craven 41' (pen.); Mansaray (yellow card) 43' (goal) 46'; Ramos 56'; John (yellow card) 77'; Tolo (yellow card) 85'	Report	Levis (yellow card) 41'; Greig (yellow card) 45' (goal) 45+1' (pen.); Frano 72' (yellow card) 85'	Stadium: Starfire Sports Complex; Attendance: 1,314

June 14, 2016 USL 14	Portland Timbers 2	1–2	Seattle Sounders FC 2	Portland, Oregon
19:30 (PDT)	Bodily 67'	Report	Samuel 35'; Magnus 43'; Delem (yellow card) 54'; Kapawa (yellow card) 88'; Mansaray (yellow card) 90'	Stadium: Providence Park; Attendance: 2,536; Referee: Ekaterina Koroleva

June 26, 2016 USL 15	Seattle Sounders FC 2	0–2	Swope Park Rangers	Tukwila, Washington
17:00 (PDT)	Delem (yellow card) 62'	Report	Molano (yellow card) 3'; Kelly (yellow card) 46'; Tyrpak 65'; Grant (yellow card) 85'; Gonzalez 88'	Stadium: Starfire Sports Complex; Attendance: 1,309; Referee: Victor Rivas

July 2, 2016 USL 16	Sacramento Republic FC	2–1	Seattle Sounders FC 2	Sacramento, California
20:00 (PDT)	H. Williams 5' da Fonte 78'; Christian (yellow card) 83' da Fonte (yellow card) 83'; Motagalvan (yellow card) 90'	Report	Nelson (yellow card) 49'; Mathers 70'	Stadium: Bonney Field; Attendance: 11,569

July 6, 2016 USL 17	Saint Louis FC	1–1	Seattle Sounders FC 2	Fenton, Missouri
17:00 (PDT)	Fink 87'	Report	Alihodžić 12'; Jones (yellow card) 80'	Stadium: World Wide Technology Soccer Park; Attendance: 4,400; Referee: Tyler Ploeger

July 10, 2016 USL 18	Seattle Sounders FC 2	2–1	Colorado Springs Switchbacks FC	Tukwila, Washington
17:00 (PDT)	Jones 60'; Mansaray 86'; Samuel (yellow card) 89'	Report	Seth 27'; Greenspan (yellow card) 31' (yellow-red card) 70'	Stadium: Starfire Sports; Attendance: 1,370

July 16, 2016 USL 19	Arizona United SC	2–3	Seattle Sounders FC 2	Peoria, Arizona
19:30 (PDT)	Cortez 29'; Tan 36'; Uzo (yellow card) 88'; Ringhof (yellow card) 90+'; Stagmiller (yellow card) 90+'	Report	Jones 25', 56'; Schweitzer 45' (yellow card) 69'	Stadium: Peoria Sports Complex; Attendance: 1,325; Referee: Marco Veiga

July 24, 2016 USL 20	Seattle Sounders FC 2	1–0	Portland Timbers 2	Tukwila, Washington
17:00 (PDT)	Mathers (yellow card) 74'; O'Ojong 89'	Report	Damraoui (yellow card) 62'	Stadium: Starfire Sports Complex; Attendance: 1,618; Referee: Alejandro Mariscal

August 1, 2016 USL 21	Seattle Sounders FC 2	4-1	Real Monarchs	Tukwila, Washington
19:30 (PDT)	Samuel 33'; Jones 60'; Samuel 86'; Jones 90+2'	Report	Brody 22'	Stadium: Starfire Sports Complex; Attendance: 1,254; Referee: Chipalo Street

August 6, 2016 USL 22	Whitecaps FC 2	1-1	Seattle Sounders FC 2	Vancouver, British Columbia
15:00 (PDT)	Safiu (yellow card) 8'; Haber (yellow card) 30' (goal) 54'; Frano (yellow card) 69'	Report	Mathers 36'; Fisher (yellow card) 63'	Stadium: Thunderbird Stadium; Attendance: 2,284

August 13, 2016 USL 23	Rio Grande Valley FC Toros	6-0	Seattle Sounders FC 2	Edinburg, Texas
17:30 (PDT)	Garcia 44' 45+'; Luna 48'; Bird 82'; Murphy 90+'; Catic 90+'	Report		Stadium: RGVFC Stadium; Attendance: 1,905

August 20, 2016 USL 24	San Antonio FC	1-0	Seattle Sounders FC 2	San Antonio, Texas
17:30 (PDT)	Castillo 51'	Report		Stadium: Toyota Field; Attendance: 6,417; Referee: Kyle Phillips

August 29, 2016 USL 25	Seattle Sounders FC 2	2-1	Portland Timbers 2	Tukwila, Washington
19:30 (PDT)	Parra (yellow card) 30'; Mathers 51' (pen.); Schweitzer 88'	Report	Gallagher (yellow card) 30'; Arboleda 76'	Stadium: Starfire Sports Complex; Attendance: 1,570; Referee: Josh Wilkens

September 2, 2016 USL 26	Seattle Sounders FC 2	2-1	Whitecaps FC 2	Tukwila, Washington
19:30 (PDT)	Delem (yellow card) 9'; Parra 67'; Tolo (yellow card) 79'; Jones 90+4'	Report	Wynne (yellow card) 35'; Safiu (yellow card) 43'; Greig 64' de Wit (yellow card) 90'	Stadium: Starfire Sports Complex; Attendance: 1,534

September 5, 2016 USL 27	Whitecaps FC 2	2-2	Seattle Sounders FC 2	Langley, British Columbia
19:30 (PDT)	Bustos 3', 50' (pen.); Levis (yellow card) 30'; Greig (yellow card) 57'; Haber (yellow card) 63'; Díaz (yellow card) 69'		Schweitzer 21' (yellow card) 49' (goal) 88'; Kapawa (yellow card) 42'; Mathers (red card) 50'; Fisher (yellow card) 60'; Fisher (yellow card) 66'	Stadium: Mcleod Athletic Park; Attendance: 2,200

September 11, 2016 USL 28	Oklahoma City Energy FC	2-2	Seattle Sounders FC 2	Oklahoma City, Oklahoma
16:00 (PDT)	Hyland 11'; Olsson 59'	Report	Mansaray 54'; Alfaro 90+'	Stadium: Taft Stadium

September 17, 2016 USL 29	Colorado Springs Switchbacks FC	2-1	Seattle Sounders FC 2	Colorado Springs, Colorado
18:00 (PDT)	Argueta 8'; Seth 90'	Report	Jones 30'; Tolo (yellow card) 70'	Stadium: Switchbacks Stadium; Attendance: 4,308

September 24, 2016 USL 30	Swope Park Rangers	2-0	Seattle Sounders FC 2	Kansas City, Missouri
17:00 (PDT)	Didic 11'; Pasher 75'	Report	Tolo (red card) 41'; Kapawa (yellow card) 53'	Stadium: Swope Soccer Village; Attendance: 1,590; Referee: Jon Freemon
