= 2019 Seattle Sounders FC season =

American soccer team season

Seattle Sounders FC
2019 season
- General manager: Garth Lagerwey
- Head coach: Brian Schmetzer
- Stadium: CenturyLink Field
- Major League Soccer: Conference: 2nd Overall: 4th
- MLS Cup playoffs: Winners
- U.S. Open Cup: Fourth round
- Top goalscorer: League: Raúl Ruidíaz (11); All: Raúl Ruidíaz (15)
- Highest home attendance: Playoffs: 69,274 (Nov. 10 vs. Toronto, MLS Cup); League: 50,072 (July 21 vs. Portland Timbers)
- Lowest home attendance: League: 37,722 (Apr. 6 vs. Real Salt Lake); USOC: 6,280 (June 12 vs. Portland)
- Average home league attendance: League: 40,247
Home colors	Away colors

The 2019 Seattle Sounders FC season was the club's eleventh season in Major League Soccer, the United States' top-tier of professional soccer. The 2019 season was Brian Schmetzer's third full MLS season as head coach of the Sounders. Seattle-based Zulily became the official jersey sponsor of the Sounders in the 2019 season.

Sounders FC won their second MLS Cup title at the end of the season, playing in front of a franchise-record 69,274 fans at CenturyLink Field.

== Recap ==
In January 2019, the Sounders announced that their USL-affiliated team, Seattle Sounders FC 2, that had moved to Tacoma, Washington would be re-branded as the Tacoma Defiance. In addition, the club announced that Zulily would replace Xbox as the jersey sponsor after signing a multi-year deal.

Long-time midfielder Osvaldo Alonso, who had served as captain and been with the club since its inaugural MLS season, was released into free agency and signed with Minnesota United FC in January 2019. Defender Chad Marshall, who had joined in 2014, announced his retirement from professional soccer on May 22, leaving mid-way through the season.

On August 2, defender Román Torres was suspended for ten matches after testing positive for a performance-enhancing substance by the league.

The Sounders clinched a spot in the 2020 CONCACAF Champions League by virtue of having the 4th best record in the regular season and making it to the Western Conference Finals in the Playoffs; the three other teams in the Conference Finals had also clinched berths in the Champions League or were ineligible (in the case of Toronto FC).

== Roster ==
Note: Flags indicate national team as defined under FIFA eligibility rules; some limited exceptions apply. Players may hold more than one non-FIFA nationality. Squad correct as of August 12, 2019.

No.	Pos.	Nation	Player
1	GK	USA	Trey Muse (HGP)
3	DF	USA	Jonathan Campbell
4	MF	SWE	Gustav Svensson
5	DF	CMR	Nouhou Tolo
7	MF	USA	Cristian Roldan
8	MF	ESP	Víctor Rodríguez
9	FW	PER	Raúl Ruidíaz (DP)
10	MF	URU	Nicolás Lodeiro (DP)
11	DF	AUS	Brad Smith (on loan from A.F.C. Bournemouth)
12	DF	USA	Saad Abdul-Salaam
13	FW	USA	Jordan Morris (HGP)
15	MF	ARG	Emanuel Cecchini (on loan from Málaga CF)
16	MF	USA	Alex Roldan
17	FW	USA	Will Bruin
18	DF	SUR	Kelvin Leerdam
19	MF	USA	Harry Shipp
20	DF	KOR	Kim Kee-hee
21	MF	MTQ	Jordy Delem
23	FW	MEX	Luis Silva
24	GK	SUI	Stefan Frei
25	DF	ECU	Xavier Arreaga (DP)
29	DF	PAN	Román Torres
33	DF	TRI	Joevin Jones
35	GK	USA	Bryan Meredith
70	MF	KEN	Handwalla Bwana (HGP)
75	MF	USA	Danny Leyva (HGP)
87	FW	USA	Alfonso Ocampo-Chavez (HGP)
99	FW	USA	Justin Dhillon

== Competitions ==
Win Draw Loss Upcoming fixture

=== Preseason ===
==== Mobile Mini Sun Cup ====
February 9	Houston Dynamo	3–2	Seattle Sounders FC	Tucson, Arizona
5:00 pm (PST)	Cabezas (yellow card) 31' (goal) 70'; Vera (yellow card) 41'; Struna (red card) 62'; Peña 80'; Hairston 88'	Recap	Lodeiro 14'; Ruidíaz 18'; Vargas (yellow card) 72'; VanAlstine (yellow card) 78'	Stadium: Kino Sports Complex
Note: View Match

February 13	Portland Timbers	2–1	Seattle Sounders FC	Tucson, Arizona
6:00 pm (PST)	Valeri 40' (pen.); Ebobisse 88'; Flores (yellow card) 90'	Preview	Bwana 33'; A. Roldan (yellow card) 36'; Vargas (yellow card) 50'	Stadium: Kino Sports Complex

February 16	Seattle Sounders FC	1–2	FC Dallas	Tucson, Arizona
9:00 am (PST)	Lodeiro (yellow card) 43'; Abdul-Salaam (yellow card) 65'; Nouhou 91'	Preview	Ziegler (yellow card) 18'; Badji 34'; Roberts 80'	Stadium: Kino Sports Complex

==== Other ====
February 2 Friendly	Seattle Sounders FC	1–7	Atlanta United FC	Fullerton, California
11:00 am PST	Serrano 88'	Report	J. Martínez 13', 46'; G. Martínez 30+1' (pen.); Pereira 72', 109'; Williams 95', 101'	Stadium: Titan Stadium; Attendance: 0
Note: Match was played behind closed doors in four 30-minute periods.

February 23 Friendly	San Jose Earthquakes	2–2	Seattle Sounders FC	San Jose, California
12:45 pm PST	Wondolowski 57' (pen.), 61' (pen.); Judson (yellow card) 83'	Report	Leerdam (yellow card) 20' (yellow-red card) 60'; Rodríguez 32', 52'	Stadium: Avaya Stadium; Referee: Ismail Elfath

=== Friendlies ===
February 20	Seattle Sounders FC	0–2	Club Nacional	Seattle, Washington
7:30 pm (PST)	Wingo (yellow card) 42'	Report	Bergessio 19'; Rodríguez 53'; Pereira (yellow card) 69'	Stadium: CenturyLink Field; Attendance: 32,233; Referee: Farhad Dadko

July 17	Seattle Sounders FC	1–3	Borussia Dortmund	Seattle, Washington
7:30 pm (PDT)	Campbell 54'	Report	Wolf 37'; Alcácer 50'; Sancho 77'	Stadium: CenturyLink Field; Attendance: 37,722; Referee: Allen Chapman

=== Major League Soccer ===
==== League tables ====
===== Western Conference =====
2019 MLS Western Conference standings
Pos	Team	Pld	W	L	T	GF	GA	GD	Pts	Qualification
1	Los Angeles FC	34	21	4	9	85	37	+48	72	MLS Cup Conference Semifinals
2	Seattle Sounders FC	34	16	10	8	51	49	+2	56	MLS Cup First Round
3	Real Salt Lake	34	16	13	5	45	41	+4	53	MLS Cup First Round
4	Minnesota United FC	34	15	11	8	52	42	+10	53	MLS Cup First Round
5	LA Galaxy	34	16	15	3	56	55	+1	51	MLS Cup First Round

Source: MLS
Rules for classification: 1) points; 2) total wins; 3) total goal differential; 4) total goals scored; 5) disciplinary points; 6) away goal differential; 7) away goals scored; 8) home goals scored; 9) home goal differential; 10) coin toss or drawing of lots

===== Overall =====
2019 MLS regular season standings
Pos	Team	Pld	W	L	T	GF	GA	GD	Pts	Qualification
2	New York City FC	34	18	6	10	63	42	+21	64	CONCACAF Champions League
3	Atlanta United FC	34	18	12	4	58	43	+15	58	CONCACAF Champions League
4	Seattle Sounders FC (C)	34	16	10	8	52	49	+3	56	CONCACAF Champions League
5	Philadelphia Union	34	16	11	7	58	50	+8	55	
6	Real Salt Lake	34	16	13	5	46	41	+5	53	

Source: MLS
Rules for classification: 1) points; 2) total wins; 3) total goal differential; 4) total goals scored; 5) disciplinary points; 6) away goals scored; 7) away goal differential; 8) coin toss or drawing of lots
(C) MLS Cup champion

==== Results ====
Overall								Home						Away					
Pld	W	D	L	GF	GA	GD	Pts	W	D	L	GF	GA	GD	W	D	L	GF	GA	GD
34	16	8	10	52	49	+3	56	11	4	2	34	21	+13	5	4	8	18	28	−10

Last updated: October 6, 2019.
Source: MLS

Matchday	1	2	3	4	5	6	7	8	9	10	11	12	13	14	15	16	17	18	19	20	21	22	23	24	25	26	27	28	29	30	31	32	33	34
Stadium	H	H	A	A	H	A	H	A	H	H	A	H	H	A	A	A	A	H	A	A	H	H	A	H	H	A	A	A	H	H	H	A	A	H
Result	W	W	W	D	W	L	W	L	D	D	D	W	W	D	L	L	L	W	L	W	W	L	W	L	D	L	D	W	W	W	D	L	W	W

Source: MLS
A = Away; H = Home; W = Win; D = Draw; L = Loss

March 2 MLS 1	Seattle Sounders FC	4–1	FC Cincinnati	Seattle, Washington
7:00 pm (PST)	Leerdam 27'; Morris 33', 43'; Ruidíaz 87'	Recap; Boxscore	Bertone 13'; Adi (yellow card) 46'	Stadium: CenturyLink Field; Attendance: 39,011; Referee: Chris Penso

March 9 MLS 2	Seattle Sounders FC	2–0	Colorado Rapids	Seattle, Washington
7:00 pm (PST)	Leerdam 5', (yellow card) 65'Ruidíaz 8'; Svensson (yellow card) 25'; Morris (yellow card) 52'; C. Roldan (yellow card) 59'; Lodeiro (yellow card) 90+3'	Recap; Boxscore	Rosenberry (yellow card) 17'; Feilhaber (yellow card) 33'	Stadium: CenturyLink Field; Attendance: 37,725; Referee: Baldomero Toledo

March 16 MLS 3	Chicago Fire SC	2–4	Seattle Sounders FC	Bridgeview, Illinois
10:00 am (PDT)	Edwards 56', (yellow card) 64'; Herbers 84', (yellow card) 90+2'	Recap; Boxscore	Rodríguez 8'; Morris 15'; Lodeiro 49' (pen.); C. Roldan (yellow card) 77'; Ruidíaz 88'	Stadium: SeatGeek Stadium; Attendance: 10,032; Referee: Joseph Dickerson

March 30 MLS 4 Cascadia Cup	Vancouver Whitecaps FC	0–0	Seattle Sounders FC	Vancouver, British Columbia
7:00 pm (PDT)	Felipe (yellow card) 90+1'	Recap; Boxscore		Stadium: BC Place; Attendance: 24,803; Referee: Robert Sibiga

April 6 MLS 5	Seattle Sounders FC	1–0	Real Salt Lake	Seattle, Washington
7:00 pm (PDT)	Lodeiro 18'; C. Roldan (yellow card) 73'; Leerdam (yellow card) 78'	Recap; Boxscore	Silva (yellow card) 83'	Stadium: CenturyLink Field; Attendance: 37,722; Referee: Nima Saghafi

April 10 MLS 6	Colorado Rapids	–	Seattle Sounders FC	Commerce City, Colorado
6:00 pm (PDT)		Preview		Stadium: Dick's Sporting Goods Park
Note: Postponed to September 7 due to inclement weather

April 13 MLS 7	Seattle Sounders FC	3–2	Toronto FC	Seattle, Washington
1:00 pm (PDT)	Bruin 24', 66'; Kim (yellow card) 61'; C. Roldan 68'; Lodeiro (yellow card) 81'; Rodríguez (yellow card) 88'	Recap; Boxscore	Altidore 11', 70'	Stadium: CenturyLink Field; Attendance: 37,722; Referee: Allen Chapman

April 21 MLS 8	Los Angeles FC	4–1	Seattle Sounders FC	Los Angeles, California
4:00 pm (PDT)	Vela 12', 55' Atuesta (yellow card) 35', (goal) 39' Ramirez 61'	Recap; Boxscore	Torres (yellow card) 22'; Kim (yellow card) 44'; Shipp 51'; Leerdam (yellow card) 58'; Delem (yellow card) 67'	Stadium: Banc of California Stadium; Attendance: 22,221; Referee: Baldomero Toledo

April 24 MLS 9 Heritage Cup	Seattle Sounders FC	2–2	San Jose Earthquakes	Seattle, Washington
7:30 pm (PDT)	Bwana (yellow card) 35'; Leerdam 65'; Shipp 67'; Lodeiro (yellow card) 77'	Recap; Boxscore	Salinas 34', 53'; Hoesen (yellow card) 70'; Felipe (yellow card) 87'; Wondolowski (yellow card) 90+5'	Stadium: CenturyLink Field; Attendance: 37,722; Referee: Fotis Bazakos

April 28 MLS 10	Seattle Sounders FC	1–1	Los Angeles FC	Seattle, Washington
12:30 pm (PDT)	Morris 1'; Kim (yellow card) 10'; C. Roldan (red card) 18'; Lodeiro (yellow card) 59'; Leerdam (red card) 90+5'	Recap; Boxscore	Vela 4'; Kaye (yellow card) 18'; Blackmon (yellow card) 42'	Stadium: CenturyLink Field; Attendance: 38,581; Referee: Ted Unkel
Note: Roldan's red card was rescinded after an appeal.

May 4 MLS 11	Minnesota United FC	1–1	Seattle Sounders FC	Saint Paul, Minnesota
5:00 pm (PDT)	Opara 26'; Greguš (yellow card) 45'	Recap; Boxscore	C. Roldan 42'	Stadium: Allianz Field; Attendance: 19,832; Referee: Timothy Ford

May 11 MLS 12	Seattle Sounders FC	1–0	Houston Dynamo	Seattle, Washington
7:00 pm (PDT)	C. Roldan 5'; Bruin (yellow card) 78'	Recap; Boxscore	Cerén (yellow card) 28'; DeLaGarza (yellow card) 59'; Fuenmayor (yellow card) 90+2'	Stadium: CenturyLink Field; Attendance: 39,232; Referee: Alex Chilowicz

May 15 MLS 13	Seattle Sounders FC	2–1	Orlando City SC	Seattle, Washington
7:30 pm (PDT)	Ruidíaz 19'; Bwana 68'	Recap; Boxscore	Mueller 75'; Dwyer (yellow card) 79'; Rosell (yellow card) 89'	Stadium: CenturyLink Field; Attendance: 37,722; Referee: David Gantar

May 18 MLS 14	Philadelphia Union	0–0	Seattle Sounders FC	Chester, Pennsylvania
4:30 pm (PDT)	Przybyłko (yellow card) 72'; Picault (yellow card) 83'	Recap; Boxscore	Nouhou (yellow card) 56'; Campbell (yellow card) 86'	Stadium: Talen Energy Stadium; Attendance: 18,540; Referee: Marcos de Oliveira

May 26 MLS 15	Sporting Kansas City	3–2	Seattle Sounders FC	Kansas City, Kansas
3:00 pm (PDT)	Feilhaber (yellow card) 26'; Russell 29', 45+1', 68'; Croizet (yellow card) 34'	Recap; Boxscore	Torres (yellow card) 13'; Lodeiro (yellow card) 60'; Ruidíaz 63'; Leerdam 71'	Stadium: Children's Mercy Park; Attendance: 19,882; Referee: Christopher Penso

June 1 MLS 16	FC Dallas	2–1	Seattle Sounders FC	Frisco, Texas
5:00 pm (PDT)	Acosta (yellow card) 44'; Ferreira (yellow card) 71'; Ondrášek (yellow card) 84'; Gruezo (yellow card) 90+5'	Recap; Boxscore	Arreaga 33' (o.g.); Smith 38' (o.g.); Leerdam (yellow card) 38'; Ruidíaz 65'	Stadium: Toyota Stadium; Attendance: 14,327; Referee: Baldomero Toledo

June 5 MLS 17	Montreal Impact	2–1	Seattle Sounders FC	Montreal, Quebec
4:30 pm (PDT)	Camacho (yellow card) 31'; Taïder 74' (pen.), 78'	Recap; Boxscore	Nouhou (yellow card) 56'; Delem (yellow card) 61'; Rodríguez 64' (pen.)	Stadium: Stade Saputo; Attendance: 13,037; Referee: Nima Saghafi

June 29 MLS 18 Cascadia Cup	Seattle Sounders FC	1–0	Vancouver Whitecaps FC	Seattle, Washington
7:00 pm (PDT)	Leerdam 90+6'	Recap; Boxscore	Reyna (yellow card) 66'; Venuto (yellow card) 90+2'	Stadium: CenturyLink Field; Attendance: 44,489; Referee: Alan Kelly

July 3 MLS 19	New York City FC	3–0	Seattle Sounders FC	New York, New York
4:00 pm (PDT)	Ring (yellow card) 42'; Moralez 58'; Medina 77'; Ofori 87'	Recap; Boxscore	Nouhou (yellow card) 4'; Kim (yellow card) 73'	Stadium: Yankee Stadium; Attendance: 18,217; Referee: Rubiel Vazquez

July 6 MLS 20	Columbus Crew SC	1–2	Seattle Sounders FC	Columbus, Ohio
4:30 pm (PDT)	Santos 13' (pen.), (yellow card) 42'; Guzmán (yellow card) 29'; Artur (yellow card) 79'; Afful (yellow card) 85'; Argudo (yellow card) 90+3'	Recap; Boxscore	Lodeiro 56' (pen.), 90+3', (yellow card) 85'; Leyva (yellow card) 70'	Stadium: Mapfre Stadium; Attendance: 14,183; Referee: Chris Penso

July 14 MLS 21	Seattle Sounders FC	2–1	Atlanta United FC	Seattle, Washington
12:55 pm (PDT)	Ruidíaz 58'; Shipp 71'	Recap; Boxscore	Robinson (yellow card) 22'; Parkhurst (yellow card) 41'; Martínez 65'; Escobar (yellow card) 82'	Stadium: CenturyLink Field; Attendance: 38,232; Referee: Robert Sibiga

July 21 MLS 22 Cascadia Cup	Seattle Sounders FC	1–2	Portland Timbers	Seattle, Washington
6:30 pm (PDT)	Ruidíaz 50'; Leerdam (yellow card) 66'	Recap; Boxscore	Fernández 20', 51', (yellow card) 82'; Moreira (yellow card) 84'; Chara (yellow card) 90+9'	Stadium: CenturyLink Field; Attendance: 50,072; Referee: Drew Fischer

July 27 MLS 23	Houston Dynamo	0–1	Seattle Sounders FC	Houston, Texas
5:00 pm (PDT)	Peña (yellow card) 82'	Recap; Boxscore	Delem (yellow card) 50'; Morris 59'; Shipp (yellow card) 72'	Stadium: BBVA Compass Stadium; Attendance: 15,138; Referee: Nima Saghafi

August 4 MLS 24	Seattle Sounders FC	2–3	Sporting Kansas City	Seattle, Washington
7:00 pm (PDT)	Nouhou (yellow card) 35'; Morris 46', 82'; Abdul-Salaam (yellow card) 55'; Lodeiro (yellow card) 71'	Recap; Boxscore	Gutiérrez 12', 33' (pen.); Sinovic (yellow card) 40'; Gerso (yellow card) 53'; Hurtado 58'; Feilhaber (yellow card) 62'	Stadium: CenturyLink Field; Attendance: 37,722; Referee: Ismail Elfath

August 10 MLS 25	Seattle Sounders FC	3–3	New England Revolution	Seattle, Washington
1:00 pm (PDT)	Shipp 2', 65'; Lodeiro 66'; Kee-hee (yellow card) 89'	Recap; Boxscore	Mancienne 27', (yellow card) 54'; Bou 35'; Farrell (yellow card) 46'; Gil 87' (pen.)	Stadium: CenturyLink Field; Attendance: 38,826; Referee: David Gantar

August 14 MLS 26	Real Salt Lake	3–0	Seattle Sounders FC	Sandy, Utah
7:00 pm (PDT)	Johnson 25'; Luiz (yellow card) 52'; Rusnák 71'; Baird 87'	Recap; Boxscore	Jones (yellow card) 70'	Stadium: Rio Tinto Stadium; Attendance: 17,825; Referee: Armando Villarreal

August 17 MLS 27	LA Galaxy	2–2	Seattle Sounders FC	Carson, California
7:00 pm (PDT)	Steres (red card) 6'; Ibrahimovic 45', 65' (pen.); Skjelvik 82' (o.g.)	Recap; Boxscore	Morris (yellow card) 21'; Ruidíaz 42'	Stadium: Dignity Health Sports Park; Attendance: 26,213; Referee: Robert Sibiga

August 23 MLS 28 Cascadia Cup	Portland Timbers	1–2	Seattle Sounders FC	Portland, Oregon
7:00 pm (PDT)	Valeri 54'	Recap; Boxscore	C. Roldan 22'; Ruidíaz 47'; Leerdam (yellow card) 53'; Jones (yellow card) 65'; Abdul-Salaam (yellow card) 84'; Frei (yellow card) 90+1'	Stadium: Providence Park; Attendance: 25,218; Referee: Jair Marrufo

September 1 MLS 29	Seattle Sounders FC	4–3	LA Galaxy	Seattle, Washington
3:30 pm (PDT)	Ruidíaz 45+2'; Arreaga (yellow card) 47'; C. Roldan 55', 89'; Morris 77'	Recap; Boxscore	González (yellow card) 6'; Polenta (yellow card) 62'; Ibrahimović 66'; Antuna 75'; Skjelvik 81'	Stadium: CenturyLink Field; Attendance: 46,673; Referee: Chris Penso

September 7 MLS 6	Colorado Rapids	2–0	Seattle Sounders FC	Commerce City, Colorado
6:00 pm (PDT)	Shinyashiki 41', 70'	Recap; Boxscore	Cecchini (yellow card) 79'	Stadium: Dick's Sporting Goods Park; Attendance: 16,607; Referee: Kevin Stott
Note: Postponed from April 10 due to inclement weather

September 15 MLS 30	Seattle Sounders FC	4–2	New York Red Bulls	Seattle, Washington
3:00 pm (PDT)	Morris 2'; Lodeiro 23', 90+4'; Delem (yellow card) 38'; Davis 83' (o.g.); C. Roldan (yellow card) 89'	Recap; Boxscore	Long (yellow card) 12', (goal) 27'; Murillo (yellow card) 26'; Gamarra 67'; Wright-Phillips (yellow card) 76'	Stadium: CenturyLink Field; Attendance: 37,722; Referee: Allen Chapman

September 18 MLS 31	Seattle Sounders FC	0–0	FC Dallas	Seattle, Washington
7:30 pm (PDT)	Arreaga (yellow card) 24' (yellow-red card) 86'; Kee-hee (yellow card) 90+11'	Recap; Boxscore	Hollingshead (yellow card) 67'	Stadium: CenturyLink Field; Attendance: 37,722; Referee: Drew Fischer

September 22 MLS 32	D.C. United	2–0	Seattle Sounders FC	Washington, D.C.
5:00 pm (PDT)	Rodríguez 14'; Brillant 54'	Recap; Boxscore	Leerdam (yellow card) 53'	Stadium: Audi Field; Attendance: 18,489; Referee: Alan Kelly

September 29 MLS 33 Heritage Cup	San Jose Earthquakes	0–1	Seattle Sounders FC	San Jose, California
4:30 pm (PDT)	Thompson (red card) 56'	Recap; Boxscore	Arreaga (yellow card) 60' (yellow-red card) 71'; Nouhou (yellow card) 87'; Morris 90+4'	Stadium: Avaya Stadium; Attendance: 18,000; Referee: Ismail Elfath

October 6 MLS 34	Seattle Sounders FC	1–0	Minnesota United FC	Seattle, Washington
1:00 pm (PDT)	Torres 29'	Recap; Boxscore	Opara (yellow card) 23'	Stadium: CenturyLink Field; Attendance: 47,297; Referee: Kevin Stott

=== MLS Cup Playoffs ===
October 19 First round	Seattle Sounders FC	4–3 (a.e.t.)	FC Dallas	Seattle, Washington
12:30 pm (PDT)	Ruidíaz 18'; Morris 22', 74', 113'	Recap; Boxscore	Acosta (yellow card) 25', (goal) 82'; Cannon 39', (yellow card) 44'; Hedges 64'; González (yellow card) 88'	Stadium: CenturyLink Field; Attendance: 37,722; Referee: Nima Saghafi

October 23 Western Conference semifinals	Seattle Sounders FC	2–0	Real Salt Lake	Seattle, Washington
7:0 pm (PDT)	Svensson 64'; Lodeiro 81', (yellow card) 82'	Recap; Boxscore	Onuoha (yellow card) 28'; Luiz (red card) 83'	Stadium: CenturyLink Field; Attendance: 37,722; Referee: Alan Kelly

October 29 Western Conference Final	Los Angeles FC	1–3	Seattle Sounders FC	Los Angeles, California
7:00 pm (PDT)	Atuesta 17'	Recap; Boxscore	Ruidíaz 22', 64'; Lodeiro 26'; Leerdam (yellow card) 81'; Nouhou (yellow card) 90+3'	Stadium: Banc of California Stadium; Attendance: 22,099; Referee: Jair Marrufo

November 10 MLS Cup 2019	Seattle Sounders FC	3–1	Toronto FC	Seattle, Washington
12:00 pm (PST)	Leerdam 57'; Rodríguez 76'; Ruidíaz 90', (yellow card) 90+1'	Recap; Boxscore	Pozuelo (yellow card) 72'; Altidore 90+3'	Stadium: CenturyLink Field; Attendance: 69,274; Referee: Allen Chapman; MVP: Víctor Rodríguez

=== U.S. Open Cup ===
June 12 Fourth round	Seattle Sounders FC	1–2	Portland Timbers	Tacoma, Washington
7:30 pm (PDT)	Roldan (yellow card) 30'; Bruin (yellow card) 45+2'; Rodríguez 44'	Recap; Boxscore	Fernández 6', 50'	Stadium: Cheney Stadium; Attendance: 6,280; Referee: Alex Chilowicz

== Statistics ==
=== Appearances and goals ===
Numbers after plus-sign(+) denote appearances as a substitute.

No.	Pos	Nat	Player	Total		Regular season		U.S. Open Cup		Playoffs	
No.	Pos	Nat	Player	Apps	Goals	Apps	Goals	Apps	Goals	Apps	Goals
1	GK	(United States) USA	Trey Muse	0	0	0	0	0	0	0	0
3	DF	(United States) USA	Jonathan Campbell	5	0	4	0	1	0	0	0
4	MF	(Sweden) SWE	Gustav Svensson	26	1	21+1	0	0	0	4	1
5	DF	(Cameroon) CMR	Nouhou	25	0	9+13	0	1	0	0+2	0
7	MF	(United States) USA	Cristian Roldan	33	6	29	6	0	0	4	0
8	MF	(Spain) ESP	Víctor Rodríguez	21	4	14+3	2	1	1	0+3	1
9	FW	(Peru) PER	Raúl Ruidíaz	26	15	20+2	11	0	0	4	4
10	MF	(Uruguay) URU	Nicolás Lodeiro	32	9	28	7	0	0	4	2
11	DF	(Australia) AUS	Brad Smith	30	0	22+3	0	0+1	0	4	0
12	DF	(United States) USA	Saad Abdul-Salaam	19	0	11+7	0	1	0	0	0
13	FW	(United States) USA	Jordan Morris	30	13	24+2	10	0	0	4	3
14	DF	(United States) USA	Chad Marshall	8	0	8	0	0	0	0	0
15	MF	(Argentina) ARG	Emanuel Cecchini	4	0	1+3	0	0	0	0	0
16	MF	(United States) USA	Alex Roldan	10	0	5+4	0	1	0	0	0
17	FW	(United States) USA	Will Bruin	10	2	4+5	2	1	0	0	0
18	DF	(Suriname) SUR	Kelvin Leerdam	34	7	27+2	6	1	0	4	1
19	MF	(United States) USA	Harry Shipp	26	5	15+10	5	1	0	0	0
20	DF	(South Korea) KOR	Kim Kee-hee	34	0	30	0	0	0	4	0
21	MF	(Martinique) MTQ	Jordy Delem	27	0	17+6	0	0	0	0+4	0
23	MF	(United States) USA	Henry Wingo	7	0	2+4	0	0+1	0	0	0
23	FW	(Mexico) MEX	Luis Silva	6	0	2+3	0	0	0	0+1	0
24	GK	(Switzerland) SUI	Stefan Frei	38	0	34	0	0	0	4	0
25	DF	(Ecuador) ECU	Xavier Arreaga	17	0	12+2	0	0	0	1+2	0
29	DF	(Panama) PAN	Román Torres	21	1	12+5	1	0	0	3+1	0
33	DF	(Trinidad and Tobago) TRI	Joevin Jones	21	0	9+8	0	0	0	4	0
35	GK	(United States) USA	Bryan Meredith	1	0	0	0	1	0	0	0
37	FW	(United States) USA	Shandon Hopeau [TAC]	2	0	0+1	0	0+1	0	0	0
70	FW	(Kenya) KEN	Handwalla Bwana	16	1	6+9	1	1	0	0	0
75	MF	(United States) USA	Danny Leyva	7	0	4+2	0	1	0	0	0
87	FW	(United States) USA	Alfonso Ocampo-Chavez	3	0	1+2	0	0	0	0	0
99	FW	(United States) USA	Justin Dhillon	5	0	3+2	0	0	0	0	0

- Last updated: November 10, 2019
- Source: Team Stats

[TAC] – Defiance player^{[A]}

=== Top scorers ===
Rank	Position	Number	Name	MLS	MLS Playoffs	U.S. Open Cup	Total
1	FW	10	(Peru) Raúl Ruidíaz	11	4	0	15
2	FW	13	(United States) Jordan Morris	10	3	0	13
3	MF	10	(Uruguay) Nicolás Lodeiro	7	2	0	9
4	MF	7	(United States) Cristian Roldan	6	0	0	6
4	DF	18	(Suriname) Kelvin Leerdam	5	1	0	6
6	MF	19	(United States) Harry Shipp	5	0	0	5
7	MF	8	(Spain) Víctor Rodríguez	2	1	1	4
8	FW	17	(United States) Will Bruin	2	0	0	2
11	MF	4	(Sweden) Gustav Svensson	0	1	0	1
11	DF	29	(Panama) Román Torres	1	0	0	1
11	MF	70	(Kenya) Handwalla Bwana	1	0	0	1

- Last updated: November 10, 2019
- Source: Team Stats

=== Top assists ===
Rank	Position	Number	Name	MLS	MLS Playoffs	U.S. Open Cup	Total
1	MF	10	(Uruguay) Nicolás Lodeiro	12	4	0	16
3	DF	11	(Australia) Brad Smith	6	1	0	7
3	FW	13	(United States) Jordan Morris	6	1	0	7
4	FW	9	(Peru) Raúl Ruidíaz	3	3	0	6
5	MF	7	(United States) Cristian Roldan	4	1	0	5
6	MF	4	(Sweden) Gustav Svensson	1	3	0	4
6	DF	33	(Trinidad and Tobago) Joevin Jones	2	2	0	4
8	MF	8	(Spain) Víctor Rodríguez	3	0	0	3
8	MF	19	(United States) Harry Shipp	3	0	0	3
10	MF	18	(Suriname) Kelvin Leerdam	2	0	0	2
11	MF	16	(United States) Alex Roldan	1	0	0	1
11	FW	17	(United States) Will Bruin	1	0	0	1
11	DF	20	(South Korea) Kim Kee-hee	1	0	0	1
11	MF	21	(Martinique) Jordy Delem	1	0	0	1
11	MF	70	(Kenya) Handwalla Bwana	1	0	0	1

- Last updated: November 10, 2019

=== Disciplinary record ===
No.	Pos.	Player	MLS			MLS Playoffs			U.S. Open Cup			Total		
No.	Pos.	Player	Booked	(yellow card) (yellow-red card)	Sent off (straight red)	Booked	(yellow card) (yellow-red card)	Sent off (straight red)	Booked	(yellow card) (yellow-red card)	Sent off (straight red)	Booked	(yellow card) (yellow-red card)	Sent off (straight red)
3	DF	(United States) Jonathan Campbell	1	0	0	0	0	0	0	0	0	1	0	0
4	MF	(Sweden) Gustav Svensson	1	0	0	0	0	0	0	0	0	1	0	0
5	DF	(Cameroon) Nouhou Tolo	5	0	0	1	0	0	0	0	0	6	0	0
7	MF	(United States) Cristian Roldan	4	0	1 (Note: Rescinded)	0	0	0	0	0	0	4	0	1
8	MF	(Spain) Víctor Rodríguez	1	0	0	0	0	0	0	0	0	1	0	0
9	FW	(Peru) Raúl Ruidíaz	0	0	0	1	0	0	0	0	0	1	0	0
10	MF	(Uruguay) Nicolás Lodeiro	7	0	0	1	0	0	0	0	0	8	0	0
12	DF	(United States) Saad Abdul-Salaam	2	0	0	0	0	0	0	0	0	2	0	0
13	FW	(United States) Jordan Morris	2	0	0	0	0	0	0	0	0	2	0	0
15	MF	(Argentina) Emanuel Cecchini	1	0	0	0	0	0	0	0	0	1	0	0
16	MF	(United States) Alex Roldan	0	0	0	0	0	0	1	0	0	1	0	0
17	FW	(United States) Will Bruin	1	0	0	0	0	0	1	0	0	2	0	0
18	DF	(Suriname) Kelvin Leerdam	7	0	1	1	0	0	0	0	0	8	0	1
19	MF	(United States) Harry Shipp	1	0	0	0	0	0	0	0	0	1	0	0
20	DF	(South Korea) Kim Kee-hee	6	0	0	0	0	0	0	0	0	6	0	0
21	MF	(Martinique) Jordy Delem	4	0	0	0	0	0	0	0	0	4	0	0
24	GK	(Switzerland) Stefan Frei	1	0	0	0	0	0	0	0	0	1	0	0
25	DF	(Ecuador) Xavier Arreaga	1	2	0	0	0	0	0	0	0	1	2	0
29	DF	(Panama) Román Torres	2	0	0	0	0	0	0	0	0	2	0	0
22	DF	(Trinidad and Tobago) Joevin Jones	2	0	0	0	0	0	0	0	0	2	0	0
70	MF	(Kenya) Handwalla Bwana	1	0	0	0	0	0	0	0	0	1	0	0
75	MF	(United States) Danny Leyva	1	0	0	0	0	0	0	0	0	1	0	0
Total			51	2	2	4	0	0	2	0	0	58	2	2

- Last updated: November 10, 2019
- Source: Disciplinary Stats

== Honors and awards ==
=== MLS Team of the Week ===
Week	Player	Opponent	Position	Ref
1	(United States) Jordan Morris	FC Cincinnati	FW	
1	(Uruguay) Nicolás Lodeiro	FC Cincinnati	MF	
1	(Spain) Víctor Rodríguez	FC Cincinnati	Bench	
2	(Suriname) Kelvin Leerdam	Colorado Rapids	DF	
3	(Uruguay) Nicolás Lodeiro	Chicago Fire SC	MF	
3	(United States) Jordan Morris	Chicago Fire SC	Bench	
5	(Switzerland) Stefan Frei	Vancouver Whitecaps FC	GK	
7	(United States) Will Bruin	Toronto FC	FW	
9	(Australia) Brad Smith	San Jose Earthquakes & Los Angeles FC	DF	
10	(United States) Cristian Roldan	Minnesota United FC	Bench	
11	(United States) Cristian Roldan	Houston Dynamo	MF	
12	(Australia) Brad Smith	Orlando City SC & Philadelphia Union	Bench	
12	(Switzerland) Stefan Frei	Orlando City SC & Philadelphia Union	Bench	
13	(Suriname) Kelvin Leerdam	Sporting Kansas City	Bench	
17	(Suriname) Kelvin Leerdam	Vancouver Whitecaps FC	DF	
18	(Uruguay) Nicolás Lodeiro	Columbus Crew SC	MF	
19	(United States) Cristian Roldan	Atlanta United FC	MF	
21	(Cameroon) Nouhou Tolo	Houston Dynamo	DF	
25	(United States) Jordan Morris	Portland Timbers	Bench	
26	(United States) Cristian Roldan	LA Galaxy	MF	
27	(Switzerland) Stefan Frei	Colorado Rapids	Bench	
28	(United States) Jordan Morris	New York Red Bulls	FW	
28	(Uruguay) Nicolás Lodeiro	New York Red Bulls	Bench	
30	(United States) Jordan Morris	San Jose Earthquakes	Bench	
31	(Panama) Román Torres	Minnesota United FC	DF	

Bold indicates Audi Player Index Spotlight

Italics indicates MLS Player of the Week

=== MLS Goal of the Week ===
Week	Player	Opponent	Ref
6	(Uruguay) Nicolás Lodeiro	Real Salt Lake	
19	(Peru) Raúl Ruidíaz	Atlanta United FC	
21	(United States) Jordan Morris	Houston Dynamo	

=== MLS awards ===
Player	Award
(United States) Jordan Morris	MLS Comeback Player of the Year
(Spain) Víctor Rodríguez	MLS Cup MVP

Staffmember	Award
(United States) Garth Lagerwey	MLS Sporting Executive of the Year

== Transfers ==
For transfers in, dates listed are when Sounders FC officially signed the players to the roster. Transactions where only the rights to the players are acquired are not listed. For transfers out, dates listed are when Sounders FC officially removed the players from its roster, not when they signed with another club. If a player later signed with another club, his new club will be noted, but the date listed here remains the one when he was officially removed from Sounders FC roster.

=== In ===
No.	Pos.	Player	Transferred from	Fee/notes	Date	Source
3	DF	(United States) Jonathan Campbell	(United States) Chicago Fire	Traded for a fourth-round pick in the 2020 MLS SuperDraft	December 28, 2018	
1	GK	(United States) Trey Muse	(United States) Indiana University	Signed HGP Deal	January 15, 2019	
12	DF	(United States) Saad Abdul-Salaam	(United States) New York City FC	Rights acquired in exchange for $50,000 TAM	February 26, 2019	
75	MF	(United States) Danny Leyva	(United States) Tacoma Defiance	Signed HGP Deal	April 9, 2019	
87	FW	(United States) Alfonso Ocampo-Chavez	(United States) Tacoma Defiance	Signed HGP Deal	May 1, 2019	
33	DF	(Trinidad and Tobago) Joevin Jones	(Germany) SV Darmstadt 98	TAM signing	May 7, 2019	
25	DF	(Ecuador) Xavier Arreaga	(Ecuador) Barcelona S.C.	DP contract	May 7, 2019	
99	FW	(United States) Justin Dhillon	(United States) Tacoma Defiance		June 28, 2019	
15	MF	(Argentina) Emanuel Cecchini	(Spain) Málaga CF	On loan through the end of the 2020 MLS season	August 8, 2019	
23	FW	(Mexico) Luis Silva	(Finland) FC Honka		August 8, 2019	

==== Draft picks ====
Draft picks are not automatically signed to the team roster. Only those who are signed to a contract will be listed as transfers in. Only trades involving draft picks and executed after the start of 2019 MLS SuperDraft will be listed in the notes.

Date	Player	Number	Position	Previous club	Notes	Ref
January 11, 2019	(United States) Tucker Bone	40	MF	(United States) Air Force Academy	MLS SuperDraft 1st Round Pick (#20)	
January 11, 2019	(Sweden) Joel Rydstrand	42	MF	(United States) Creighton University	MLS SuperDraft 2nd Round Pick (#44)	
January 14, 2019	(United States) Aleks Berkolds	59	DF	(United States) San Diego State University	MLS SuperDraft 3rd Round Pick (#68)	

=== Out ===
No.	Pos.	Player	Transferred to	Fee/notes	Date	Source
25	GK	(United States) Calle Brown	(United States) Loudoun United FC	Option declined	November 19, 2018	
15	DF	(Mexico) Tony Alfaro	(Mexico) C.D. Guadalajara	Option declined	November 19, 2018	
99	FW	(Cameroon) Felix Chenkam		Option declined	November 19, 2018	
6	MF	(Cuba) Osvaldo Alonso	(United States) Minnesota United FC	Free agent	November 19, 2018	
27	FW	(United States) Lamar Neagle	(United States) Tacoma Stars	Free agent	November 19, 2018	
11	MF	(United States) Aaron Kovar	Retired	Out of contract	November 19, 2018	
90	DF	(Costa Rica) Waylon Francis	(United States) Columbus Crew SC	Traded for $50,000 in GAM	February 5, 2019	
30	DF	(United States) Jordan McCrary	(United States) Sacramento Republic FC	Waived	February 26, 2019	
14	DF	(United States) Chad Marshall	Retired	Retired due to injury	May 22, 2019	
23	MF	(United States) Henry Wingo	(Norway) Molde FK	Undisclosed Fee	August 12, 2019	

=== Other transactions ===
- On July 10, 2019, the Sounders signed 8-year-old goalkeeper Bheem Goyal to a first-team contract as part of a Make-a-Wish Foundation partnership.
- On August 27, 2019, Seattle Sounders FC received $100,000 in general allocation money from Nashville SC in exchange for the discovery rights for Hany Mukhtar.

== Notes ==
A. ^{a} Players who are under contract with Tacoma Defiance.
