= 2017 Seattle Sounders FC season =

American soccer team season

Seattle Sounders FC
2017 season
- General manager: Garth Lagerwey
- Head coach: Brian Schmetzer
- Stadium: CenturyLink Field
- Major League Soccer: Conference: 2nd Overall: 7th
- MLS Cup playoffs: Runners-up
- U.S. Open Cup: Round of 16
- Top goalscorer: League: Clint Dempsey (12); All: Clint Dempsey (15)
- Highest home attendance: 51,796 (Aug. 27 vs. Portland)
- Lowest home attendance: 39,587 (Nov. 2 vs. Vancouver, Playoffs)
- Average home league attendance: League: 43,666; All: 42,850
- Biggest win: League: 4–0 at Minnesota (Aug. 5)
- Biggest defeat: League: 1–4 at Chicago (May 13)
Home colors	Away colors	Third colors

The 2017 Seattle Sounders FC season was the club's ninth season in Major League Soccer, the United States' top-tier of professional soccer. The Sounders entered the 2017 season as the defending MLS Cup champions. The 2017 season is Brian Schmetzer's first full MLS season as head coach of the Sounders.

== Background ==
=== Roster ===
Note: Flags indicate national team as defined under FIFA eligibility rules; some limited exceptions apply. Players may hold more than one non-FIFA nationality. Squad correct as of August 22, 2017.

No.	Pos.	Nation	Player
1	GK	USA	Tyler Miller
2	FW	USA	Clint Dempsey (DP)
3	DF	USA	Brad Evans
4	MF	SWE	Gustav Svensson
5	DF	CMR	Nouhou
6	MF	CUB	Osvaldo Alonso (DP)
7	MF	USA	Cristian Roldan
8	MF	ESP	Víctor Rodríguez
10	MF	URU	Nicolás Lodeiro (DP)
11	MF	USA	Aaron Kovar (HGP)
12	FW	USA	Seyi Adekoya (HGP)
13	FW	USA	Jordan Morris (HGP)
14	DF	USA	Chad Marshall
15	DF	MEX	Tony Alfaro
16	MF	SCO	Calum Mallace
17	FW	USA	Will Bruin
18	DF	NED	Kelvin Leerdam
19	MF	USA	Harry Shipp
21	MF	MTQ	Jordy Delem
23	MF	USA	Henry Wingo (HGP)
24	GK	SUI	Stefan Frei
27	FW	USA	Lamar Neagle
29	DF	PAN	Román Torres
32	MF	USA	Zach Mathers
33	DF	TTO	Joevin Jones
35	GK	USA	Bryan Meredith
91	DF	JAM	Oniel Fisher

== Competitions ==
Win Draw Loss Upcoming fixture

=== Preseason ===
==== 2017 Desert Friendlies ====
February 4, 2017	Portland Timbers	1–1	Seattle Sounders FC	Tucson, Arizona
17:30 (PST)	Adi 17'; Chará (yellow card) 26'	Report	Oduro (yellow card) 16'; Shipp 71' (pen.)	Stadium: Kino Grandstand Field; Attendance: 4,064; Referee: Alan Kelly
Note: View Match

February 7, 2017	San Jose Earthquakes	1–0	Seattle Sounders FC	Tucson, Arizona
09:30 (PST)	Alashe (yellow card) 33'; Cato 57'; Imperiale (yellow card) 72'	Report		Stadium: Kino Grandstand Field; Referee: Younes Marrakchi
Note: View Match

==== 2017 Carolina Challenge Cup ====
February 18, 2017	Charleston Battery	1–1	Seattle Sounders FC	Charleston, South Carolina
16:00 (PST)	Vázquez (yellow card) 78'; Higashi 90+2'	Report	Mueller 32' (o.g.); Delem (yellow card) 37'; Jones (yellow card) 40'	Stadium: MUSC Health Stadium; Referee: Ted Unkel

February 22, 2017	Atlanta United FC	4–2	Seattle Sounders FC	Charleston, South Carolina
16:30 (PST)	Martínez 1', 46'; Almirón 3' (pen.); Villalba 21' (red card) 66' 69'; González Pírez (yellow card) 36'; Heath (yellow card) 78'; Kratz (yellow card) 78'	Report	Delem (yellow card) 29'; Wingo 62'; Bruin 74'; Lodeiro (yellow card) 84'	Stadium: MUSC Health Stadium

February 25, 2017	Columbus Crew	1–0	Seattle Sounders FC	Charleston, South Carolina
13:30 (PST)	Trapp (yellow card) 15'; Hansen 82'	Report	Alonso (yellow card) 46'; Roldan (yellow card) 89'	Stadium: MUSC Health Stadium

=== Major League Soccer ===
==== League tables ====
===== Western Conference =====
Pos	Team	Pld	W	L	T	GF	GA	GD	Pts	Qualification
1	Portland Timbers	34	15	11	8	60	50	+10	53	MLS Cup Conference Semifinals
2	Seattle Sounders FC	34	14	9	11	52	39	+13	53	MLS Cup Conference Semifinals
3	Vancouver Whitecaps FC	34	15	12	7	50	49	+1	52	MLS Cup Knockout Round
4	Houston Dynamo	34	13	10	11	57	45	+12	50	MLS Cup Knockout Round
5	Sporting Kansas City	34	12	9	13	40	29	+11	49	MLS Cup Knockout Round

Source: MLS

===== Overall =====
Pos	Team	Pld	W	L	T	GF	GA	GD	Pts
5	Columbus Crew	34	16	12	6	53	49	+4	54
6	Portland Timbers	34	15	11	8	60	50	+10	53
7	Seattle Sounders FC	34	14	9	11	52	39	+13	53
8	Vancouver Whitecaps FC	34	15	12	7	50	49	+1	52
9	New York Red Bulls	34	14	12	8	53	47	+6	50

Source: MLS
Rules for classification: 1) points; 2) total wins; 3) total goal differential; 4) total goals scored; 5) disciplinary points; 6) away goals scored; 7) away goal differential; 8) coin toss or drawing of lots

==== Results summary ====
Overall								Home						Away					
Pld	W	D	L	GF	GA	GD	Pts	W	D	L	GF	GA	GD	W	D	L	GF	GA	GD
34	14	11	9	52	39	+13	53	11	5	1	32	12	+20	3	6	8	20	27	−7

Last updated: October 22, 2017.
Source: MLS

==== Results by matchday ====
Matchday	1	2	3	4	5	6	7	8	9	10	11	12	13	14	15	16	17	18	19	20	21	22	23	24	25	26	27	28	29	30	31	32	33	34
Stadium	A	A	H	H	A	A	A	H	H	A	A	H	H	A	H	A	H	A	A	H	H	A	A	H	H	A	H	H	A	A	H	A	H	H
Result	L	D	W	D	D	L	W	D	L	L	L	W	W	L	W	L	D	D	W	W	W	D	W	W	W	D	D	D	D	L	W	L	W	W

Updated to match(es) played on October 15, 2017. Source: MLS
A = Away; H = Home; W = Win; D = Draw; L = Loss

==== Matches ====
March 4, 2017 MLS 1	Houston Dynamo	2–1	Seattle Sounders FC	Houston, Texas
17:30 (PST)	Torres 20' (yellow card) 81'; Quioto 42'	Recap; Boxscore	Marshall (yellow card) 33'; Dempsey 58'; Torres (yellow card) 67'	Stadium: BBVA Compass Stadium; Attendance: 20,758; Referee: Ricardo Salazar

March 11, 2017 MLS 2	Montreal Impact	2–2	Seattle Sounders FC	Montreal, Quebec
16:00 (PST)	Ciman (yellow card) 11'; Mancosu 17' (yellow card) 65'; Piatti 51'	Recap; Boxscore	Lodeiro 83' (pen.); Bruin 90+4'	Stadium: Olympic Stadium; Attendance: 34,373; Referee: Jair Marrufo

March 19, 2017 MLS 3	Seattle Sounders FC	3–1	New York Red Bulls	Seattle, Washington
16:00 (PDT)	Dempsey 28' (pen.) (yellow card) 78'; Morris 66'; Shipp 79'; Fernández (yellow card) 90+2'	Recap; Boxscore	Felipe (yellow card) 25'; Robles (yellow card) 27'; Gulbrandsen (yellow card) 30'; Wright-Phillips 57' (yellow card) 62'	Stadium: CenturyLink Field; Attendance: 45,600; Referee: Baldomero Toledo

March 31, 2017 MLS 4	Seattle Sounders FC	0–0	Atlanta United FC	Seattle, Washington
19:00 (PDT)		Recap; Boxscore	Gressel (yellow card) 20'; Asad (yellow card) 43'	Stadium: CenturyLink Field; Attendance: 40,182; Referee: Robert Sibiga

April 8, 2017 MLS 5 Heritage Cup	San Jose Earthquakes	1–1	Seattle Sounders FC	San Jose, California
19:30 (PDT)	Godoy (yellow card) 33'; Alashe (yellow card) 83'; Wondolowski 90'	Recap; Boxscore	Lodeiro (yellow card) 45+1', (goal) 84'	Stadium: Avaya Stadium; Attendance: 18,000; Referee: Ricardo Salazar

April 14, 2017 MLS 6 Cascadia Cup	Vancouver Whitecaps FC	2–1	Seattle Sounders FC	Vancouver, British Columbia
19:00 (PDT)	Williams (yellow card) 27'; Montero (yellow card) 53' (goal) 65', 80'; Parker (yellow card) 90+3'	Recap; Boxscore	Lodeiro (yellow card) 37'; Shipp (yellow card) 44'; Bruin 89'	Stadium: BC Place; Attendance: 22,120; Referee: Kevin Stott

April 23, 2017 MLS 7	LA Galaxy	0–3	Seattle Sounders FC	Carson, California
13:00 (PDT)	Alessandrini (yellow card) 41'	Recap; Boxscore	Roldan (yellow card) 28'; Dempsey 29'; Cole 35' (o.g.); Morris 44'; Alfaro (yellow card) 84'	Stadium: StubHub Center; Attendance: 24,931; Referee: Ismail Elfath

April 29, 2017 MLS 8	Seattle Sounders FC	3–3	New England Revolution	Seattle, Washington
19:00 (PDT)	Alfaro (yellow card) 44'; Lodeiro 75'; Bruin (yellow card) 80' (goal) 85'; Alonso 88'	Recap; Boxscore	Kobayashi 15'; Agudelo 26', 54'	Stadium: CenturyLink Field; Attendance: 43,230; Referee: Allen Chapman

May 6, 2017 MLS 9	Seattle Sounders FC	0–1	Toronto FC	Seattle, Washington
12:00 (PDT)	Delem (yellow card) 13'; Alonso (yellow card) 46'	Recap; Boxscore	Altidore 23' (pen.); Mavinga (yellow card) 70'	Stadium: CenturyLink Field; Attendance: 41,468; Referee: Jair Marrufo

May 13, 2017 MLS 10	Chicago Fire	4–1	Seattle Sounders FC	Bridgeview, Illinois
18:00 (PDT)	Nikolić 25' (pen.), 76'; Lampson (yellow card) 48'; Accam 60'; Solignac 73'; Vincent (yellow card) 78'	Recap; Boxscore	Frei (yellow card) 26'; Dempsey 28'; Jones (yellow card) 87' (yellow-red card) 89'	Stadium: Toyota Park; Attendance: 20,153; Referee: Jorge Gonzalez

May 17, 2017 MLS 11	Sporting Kansas City	3–0	Seattle Sounders FC	Kansas City, Kansas
17:30 (PDT)	Gerso 56', 58', 69'	Recap; Boxscore	Delem (yellow card) 3'; Alfaro (yellow card) 85'	Stadium: Children's Mercy Park; Attendance: 20,139; Referee: Ted Unkel

May 20, 2017 MLS 12	Seattle Sounders FC	1–0	Real Salt Lake	Seattle, Washington
14:00 (PDT)	Shipp 42'	Recap; Boxscore	Sunny (yellow card) 25'; Beckerman (yellow card) 75'	Stadium: CenturyLink Field; Attendance: 40,588; Referee: Kevin Stott

May 27, 2017 MLS 13 Cascadia Cup	Seattle Sounders FC	1–0	Portland Timbers	Seattle, Washington
12:00 (PDT)	Roldan 4'; Frei (yellow card) 41'	Recap; Boxscore	Okugo (yellow card) 60'	Stadium: CenturyLink Field; Attendance: 47,362; Referee: Mark Geiger

May 31, 2017 MLS 14	Columbus Crew SC	3–0	Seattle Sounders FC	Columbus, Ohio
17:30 (PDT)	Higuaín 10'; Meram 21'; Kamara 59'; Mensah (yellow card) 67'	Recap; Boxscore	Adekoya (yellow card) 3'	Stadium: Mapfre Stadium; Attendance: 12,773; Referee: Dave Gantar

June 4, 2017 MLS 15	Seattle Sounders FC	1–0	Houston Dynamo	Seattle, Washington
19:00 (PDT)	Bruin 69'	Recap; Boxscore	Alex (yellow card) 28'	Stadium: CenturyLink Field; Attendance: 40,258; Referee: Baldomero Toledo

June 17, 2017 MLS 16	New York City FC	2–1	Seattle Sounders FC	New York, New York
10:00 (PDT)	Wallace (yellow card) 35'; Villa 52' (pen.), 77'; White (yellow card) 80'; Okoli (yellow card) 90+4'	Recap; Boxscore	Svensson (yellow card) 28'; Roldan (yellow card) 29', (goal) 40'; Alonso (yellow card) 48'; Marshall (yellow card) 52'	Stadium: Yankee Stadium; Attendance: 25,073; Referee: Robert Sibiga

June 21, 2017 MLS 17	Seattle Sounders FC	1–1	Orlando City SC	Seattle, Washington
19:30 (PDT)	Bruin 19'; Dempsey (yellow card) 75'; Torres (yellow card) 90+3'	Recap; Boxscore	Johnson (yellow card) 78'; Spector (yellow card) 79'; Sutter 90+4'	Stadium: CenturyLink Field; Attendance: 42,333; Referee: Ismail Elfath

June 25, 2017 MLS 18 Cascadia Cup	Portland Timbers	2–2	Seattle Sounders FC	Portland, Oregon
19:30 (PDT)	Powell (yellow card) 10'; Adi 45' (pen.); Asprilla 45+4'; Guzmán (yellow card) 90'	Recap; Boxscore	Jones 27'; Evans (red card) 44'; Dempsey 90+4'	Stadium: Providence Park; Attendance: 21,144; Referee: Ricardo Salazar

July 4, 2017 MLS 19	Colorado Rapids	1–3	Seattle Sounders FC	Commerce City, Colorado
18:00 (PDT)	Williams (yellow card) 23'; Boateng (yellow card) 45+2'; Badji (yellow card) 48', (goal) 78' da Fonte (yellow card) 54'; Gordon (yellow card) 66'	Recap; Boxscore	Dempsey 6', 85'; Bruin 30'	Stadium: Dick's Sporting Goods Park; Attendance: 17,432; Referee: Hilario Grajeda

July 19, 2017 MLS 20	Seattle Sounders FC	4–3	D.C. United	Seattle, Washington
19:30 (PDT)	Bruin 51'; Evans 62'; Svensson 74'; Roldan 78'; Lodeiro (red card) 89'	Recap; Boxscore	Brown 8'; Harkes 27'; Sarvas (yellow card) 33'; Sam 50'	Stadium: CenturyLink Field; Attendance: 42,714; Referee: Kevin Stott

July 23, 2017 MLS 21 Heritage Cup	Seattle Sounders FC	3–0	San Jose Earthquakes	Seattle, Washington
19:30 (PDT)	Roldan 54', 56'; Leerdam 65'	Recap; Boxscore	Yueill (yellow card) 57'; Godoy (yellow card) 60'; Imperiale (yellow card) 87'	Stadium: CenturyLink Field; Attendance: 43,528; Referee: Alan Kelly

July 29, 2017 MLS 22	LA Galaxy	0–0	Seattle Sounders FC	Carson, California
19:00 (PDT)	Jones (yellow card) 42'; Van Damme (yellow card) 45+1' (yellow-red card) 86'; Diallo (yellow card) 80'; Alessandrini (yellow card) 85'	Recap; Boxscore	Jones (yellow card) 83'	Stadium: StubHub Center; Attendance: 25,667; Referee: Armando Villarreal

August 5, 2017 MLS 23	Minnesota United FC	0–4	Seattle Sounders FC	Minneapolis, Minnesota
17:00 (PDT)	Cronin (yellow card) 84'	Recap; Boxscore	Bruin 9'; Dempsey 18', 73'; Morris 71'	Stadium: TCF Bank Stadium; Attendance: 22,649; Referee: José Carlos Rivero

August 12, 2017 MLS 24	Seattle Sounders FC	1–0	Sporting Kansas City	Seattle, Washington
13:00 (PDT)	Dempsey 36'; Lodeiro (yellow card) 45+1'; Torres (yellow card) 66'	Recap; Boxscore	Musa (yellow card) 27'	Stadium: CenturyLink Field; Attendance: 43,530; Referee: Baldomero Toledo

August 20, 2017 MLS 25	Seattle Sounders FC	2–1	Minnesota United FC	Seattle, Washington
19:00 (PDT)	Marshall 31'; Dempsey 90+4' (pen.)	Recap; Boxscore	Finlay 21'; Danladi (yellow card) 25'; Taylor (yellow card) 90+3'	Stadium: CenturyLink Field; Attendance: 40,312; Referee: Ismail Elfath

August 23, 2017 MLS 26 Cascadia Cup	Vancouver Whitecaps FC	1–1	Seattle Sounders FC	Vancouver, British Columbia
19:00 (PDT)	Montero (yellow card) 31', (goal) 64'; Waston (yellow card) 32'; Tchani (yellow card) 52' (yellow-red card) 60'	Recap; Boxscore	Lodeiro 19' (pen.); Nouhou (yellow card) 31'; Alfaro (yellow card) 45'	Stadium: BC Place; Attendance: 22,120; Referee: Ricardo Salazar

August 27, 2017 MLS 27 Cascadia Cup	Seattle Sounders FC	1–1	Portland Timbers	Seattle, Washington
18:30 (PDT)	Roldan 18'; Nouhou (red card) 90+3'	Recap; Boxscore	Blanco (yellow card) 20'; Valeri 45+2' (pen.); Olum (yellow card) 70'	Stadium: CenturyLink Field; Attendance: 51,796; Referee: Mark Geiger

September 10, 2017 MLS 28	Seattle Sounders FC	1–1	LA Galaxy	Seattle, Washington
18:00 (PDT)	Fisher (yellow card) 73'; Alonso (yellow card) 75'; Neagle 85'; Torres (red card) 89'	Recap; Boxscore	Zardes 25', (yellow card) 81'; Jones (yellow card) 33'; Diallo (yellow card) 42'; Alessandrini (yellow card) 55'; Giovani (yellow card) 80'	Stadium: CenturyLink Field; Attendance: 44,697; Referee: Drew Fischer

September 16, 2017 MLS 29	FC Dallas	0–0	Seattle Sounders FC	Frisco, Texas
17:00 (PDT)	Hedges (yellow card) 53'	Recap; Boxscore	Dempsey (yellow card) 60'; Leerdam (yellow card) 67'; Lodeiro (yellow card) 89'; Rodríguez (yellow card) 90+4'	Stadium: Toyota Stadium; Attendance: 15,124; Referee: Hilario Grajeda

September 23, 2017 MLS 30	Real Salt Lake	2–0	Seattle Sounders FC	Sandy, Utah
18:30 (PDT)	Savarino 52'; Mulholland 66'	Recap; Boxscore	Leerdam (yellow card) 57'; Neagle (yellow card) 90+6'	Stadium: Rio Tinto Stadium; Attendance: 19,786; Referee: Sorin Stoica

September 27, 2017 MLS 31 Cascadia Cup	Seattle Sounders FC	3–0	Vancouver Whitecaps FC	Seattle, Washington
19:30 (PDT)	Rodríguez 17'; Alonso (yellow card) 35'; Lodeiro 62'; Dempsey 69'	Recap; Boxscore	Reyna (yellow card) 24'; Waston (yellow card) 26'; Williams (yellow card) 90+1'; Tchani (red card) 90+2'	Stadium: CenturyLink Field; Attendance: 41,868; Referee: Robert Sibiga

October 1, 2017 MLS 32	Philadelphia Union	2–0	Seattle Sounders FC	Chester, Pennsylvania
10:00 (PDT)	Ilsinho (yellow card) 27'; Epps 28'; Alberg 88'	Recap; Boxscore	Delem (yellow card) 11'	Stadium: Talen Energy Stadium; Attendance: 17,431; Referee: Alan Kelly

October 15, 2017 MLS 33	Seattle Sounders FC	4–0	FC Dallas	Seattle, Washington
16:30 (PDT)	Rodríguez 31'; Bruin 64', 67'; Neagle 90+2'	Recap; Boxscore	Morales (yellow card) 8'	Stadium: CenturyLink Field; Attendance: 48,478; Referee: Drew Fischer

October 22, 2017 MLS 34	Seattle Sounders FC	3–0	Colorado Rapids	Seattle, Washington
14:00 MDT	Bruin 9'; Dempsey (red card) 24'; Torres (yellow card) 29'; Roldan (yellow card) 51'; Lodeiro 64' (pen.), 90+4' (yellow card) 90+4'; Jones (yellow card) 90+1'	Recap; Boxscore	Aigner (yellow card) 32'; Ford (yellow card) 60'; Sjöberg (red card) 62'	Stadium: CenturyLink Field; Attendance: 44,370; Referee: Chris Penso

=== MLS Cup Playoffs ===
==== Western Conference Semifinals ====
October 29, 2017 Leg 1	Vancouver Whitecaps FC	0–0	Seattle Sounders FC	Vancouver, British Columbia
17:30 (PDT)	Nosa (yellow card) 45'; Ghazal (yellow card) 79'	Recap; Boxscore	Roldan (yellow card) 87'	Stadium: BC Place; Attendance: 27,837; Referee: Kevin Stott

November 2, 2017 Leg 2	Seattle Sounders FC	2–0 (2–0 agg.)	Vancouver Whitecaps FC	Seattle, Washington
19:30 (PDT)	Lodeiro (yellow card) 9'; Dempsey 56', 88'; Torres (yellow card) 68'	Recap; Boxscore	Techera (yellow card) 38'; Montero (yellow card) 49'; Nosa (yellow card) 58'; Waston (yellow card) 82'	Stadium: CenturyLink Field; Attendance: 39,587; Referee: Baldomero Toledo

==== Western Conference Finals ====
November 21, 2017 Leg 1	Houston Dynamo	0–2	Seattle Sounders FC	Houston, Texas
18:30 (PST)	Anibaba (red card) 28'; Elis (yellow card) 29'; Martínez (yellow card) 44'	Recap; Boxscore	Svensson 11'; Bruin 42'; Nouhou (yellow card) 64'; Torres (yellow card) 88'	Stadium: BBVA Compass Stadium; Attendance: 22,661; Referee: Chris Penso

November 30, 2017 Leg 2	Seattle Sounders FC	3–0 (5–0 agg.)	Houston Dynamo	Seattle, Washington
19:30 (PST)	Rodríguez 22'; Nouhou (yellow card) 36'; Dempsey 57'; Jones (yellow card) 67'; Bruin 73'	Recap; Boxscore	Alexander (yellow card) 29'; Boniek (yellow card) 60'; Martínez (red card) 66'; Torres (yellow card) 80'	Stadium: CenturyLink Field; Attendance: 45,298; Referee: Hilario Grajeda

==== MLS Cup Final ====
December 9, 2017	Toronto FC	2–0	Seattle Sounders FC	Toronto, Ontario
13:00 (PST)	Altidore 67'; Vázquez 90+4' (yellow card) 90+5'	Recap; Boxscore		Stadium: BMO Field; Attendance: 30,584; Referee: Allen Chapman; MVP: Jozy Altidore

=== Mid-season friendlies ===
March 25, 2017	Seattle Sounders FC (United States)	1–1	(Mexico) Club Necaxa	Seattle, WA
19:00 (PDT)	Fernández 83'	Report	Maturana (yellow card) 31'; Díaz 90'	Stadium: CenturyLink Field; Attendance: 38,045; Referee: Tim Ford

July 8, 2017	Seattle Sounders FC (United States)	1–1	(Germany) Eintracht Frankfurt	Seattle, WA
12:00 (PDT)	Dempsey 44'; Nouhou (yellow card) 86'	Report	Hrgota 29'; Besuschkow (yellow card) 39'; Ordóñez (yellow card) 53'; Kamada (yellow card) 67'; Fernandes (yellow card) 74'	Stadium: CenturyLink Field; Attendance: 40,667; Referee: Victor Rivas

=== U.S. Open Cup ===
June 13, 2017 Fourth round	Seattle Sounders FC (1)	2–1	Portland Timbers (1)	Tukwila, Washington
19:30 (PDT)	Kovar 3'; Mathers 54' (pen.)	Report; Boxscore	Williams 38'; Hanson (yellow card) 69'	Stadium: Starfire Sports Complex; Attendance: 3,937; Referee: Allen Chapman

June 28, 2017 Fifth round	San Jose Earthquakes (1)	2–1	Seattle Sounders FC (1)	San Jose, California
19:30 (PDT)	Salinas 6'; Hoesen 84'; Godoy (yellow card) 90+2'	Report; Boxscore	Narbón (red card) 35'; Kovar 48'; Bruin (yellow card) 82'	Stadium: Avaya Stadium; Attendance: 13,442; Referee: Nima Saghafi

== Statistics ==
=== Appearances and goals ===
Numbers after plus-sign(+) denote appearances as a substitute.

No.	Pos	Nat	Player	Total		Regular season		U.S. Open Cup		Playoffs	
No.	Pos	Nat	Player	Apps	Goals	Apps	Goals	Apps	Goals	Apps	Goals
1	GK	(United States) USA	Tyler Miller	4	0	1	0	2	0	1	0
2	FW	(United States) USA	Clint Dempsey	32	15	25+4	12	0	0	3	3
3	DF	(United States) USA	Brad Evans	11	1	6+5	1	0	0	0	0
4	MF	(Sweden) SWE	Gustav Svensson	36	2	30+2	1	0	0	2+2	1
5	DF	(Cameroon) CMR	Nouhou	25	0	10+9	0	2	0	4	0
6	MF	(Cuba) CUB	Osvaldo Alonso	27	1	24+2	1	0	0	0+1	0
7	MF	(United States) USA	Cristian Roldan	37	6	33	6	0	0	4	0
8	MF	(Spain) ESP	Víctor Rodríguez	10	3	5+2	2	0	0	1+2	1
10	MF	(Uruguay) URU	Nicolás Lodeiro	37	7	33	7	0	0	4	0
11	MF	(United States) USA	Aaron Kovar	9	2	1+6	0	2	2	0	0
12	FW	(United States) USA	Seyi Adekoya	3	0	1+1	0	0+1	0	0	0
13	FW	(United States) USA	Jordan Morris	24	3	22+1	3	0	0	0+1	0
14	DF	(United States) USA	Chad Marshall	32	1	27+1	1	0	0	4	0
15	DF	(Mexico) MEX	Tony Alfaro	16	0	8+7	0	1	0	0	0
17	FW	(United States) USA	Will Bruin	36	13	20+11	11	0+1	0	4	2
18	DF	(Netherlands) NED	Kelvin Leerdam	19	1	14+1	1	0	0	4	0
19	MF	(United States) USA	Harry Shipp	22	2	11+7	2	1	0	2+1	0
21	MF	(Martinique) MTQ	Jordy Delem	17	0	9+5	0	1	0	1+1	0
23	MF	(United States) USA	Henry Wingo	14	0	0+11	0	1+1	0	0+1	0
24	GK	(Switzerland) SUI	Stefan Frei	35	0	33	0	0	0	2	0
27	FW	(United States) USA	Lamar Neagle	11	2	0+8	2	0	0	0+3	0
29	DF	(Panama) PAN	Román Torres	26	0	21+2	0	0	0	3	0
32	MF	(United States) USA	Zach Mathers	1	1	0	0	1	1	0	0
33	DF	(Trinidad and Tobago) TTO	Joevin Jones	35	1	28+2	1	1	0	4	0
39	GK	(United States) USA	Bryan Meredith	0	0	0	0	0	0	0	0
53	DF	(United States) USA	Sam Rogers [S2]	2	0	0	0	2	0	0	0
71	FW	(United States) USA	David Olsen [S2]	1	0	0	0	0+1	0	0	0
77	MF	(Panama) PAN	Francisco Narbón [S2]	2	0	0	0	2	0	0	0
88	MF	(United States) USA	Ray Saari [S2]	2	0	0	0	2	0	0	0
91	DF	(Jamaica) JAM	Oniel Fisher	10	0	7+2	0	0+1	0	0	0
92	DF	(Cameroon) CMR	Rodrigue Ele [S2]	1	0	0	0	1	0	0	0
99	FW	(Cameroon) CMR	Felix Chenkam [S2]	1	0	0	0	1	0	0	0
Players who left the club during the season:
8	MF	(Uruguay) URU	Álvaro Fernández	11	0	5+5	0	0+1	0	0	0
38	FW	(United States) USA	Irvin Parra [S2]	2	0	0	0	2	0	0	0
80	FW	(United States) USA	Victor Mansaray	0	0	0	0	0	0	0	0

- Last updated: November 30, 2017
- Source: Team Stats

[S2] – S2 player^{[A]}

=== Top scorers ===
Place	Position	Number	Name	MLS	MLS Cup	U.S. Open Cup	Total
1	FW	2	(United States) Clint Dempsey	12	3	0	15
2	FW	17	(United States) Will Bruin	11	2	0	13
3	MF	10	(Uruguay) Nicolás Lodeiro	7	0	0	7
4	MF	7	(United States) Cristian Roldan	6	0	0	6
5	MF	8	(Spain) Víctor Rodríguez	2	1	0	3
5	FW	13	(United States) Jordan Morris	3	0	0	3
7	MF	4	(Sweden) Gustav Svensson	1	1	0	2
7	MF	11	(United States) Aaron Kovar	0	0	2	2
7	MF	19	(United States) Harry Shipp	2	0	0	2
7	MF	27	(United States) Lamar Neagle	2	0	0	2
11	DF	3	(United States) Brad Evans	1	0	0	1
11	MF	6	(Cuba) Osvaldo Alonso	1	0	0	1
11	DF	14	(United States) Chad Marshall	1	0	0	1
11	DF	18	(Netherlands) Kelvin Leerdam	1	0	0	1
11	MF	32	(United States) Zach Mathers	0	0	1	1
11	DF	33	(Trinidad and Tobago) Joevin Jones	1	0	0	1
Own Goals				1	0	0	1
Total				49	7	3	55

- Last updated: November 30, 2017
- Source: Team Stats

=== Disciplinary record ===
No.	Pos.	Player	MLS			MLS Cup			U.S. Open Cup			Total		
No.	Pos.	Player	Booked	(yellow card) (yellow-red card)	Sent off (straight red)	Booked	(yellow card) (yellow-red card)	Sent off (straight red)	Booked	(yellow card) (yellow-red card)	Sent off (straight red)	Booked	(yellow card) (yellow-red card)	Sent off (straight red)
2	FW	(United States) Clint Dempsey	3	0	1	0	0	0	0	0	0	3	0	1
3	DF	(United States) Brad Evans	0	0	1	0	0	0	0	0	0	0	0	1
4	MF	(Sweden) Gustav Svensson	1	0	0	0	0	0	0	0	0	1	0	0
5	DF	(Cameroon) Nouhou	1	0	1	2	0	0	0	0	0	3	0	1
6	MF	(Cuba) Osvaldo Alonso	3	0	0	0	0	0	0	0	0	3	0	0
7	MF	(United States) Cristian Roldan	3	0	0	1	0	0	0	0	0	4	0	0
8	MF	(Spain) Víctor Rodríguez	1	0	0	0	0	0	0	0	0	1	0	0
10	MF	(Uruguay) Nicolás Lodeiro	5	0	1	1	0	0	0	0	0	6	0	1
12	FW	(United States) Seyi Adekoya	1	0	0	0	0	0	0	0	0	1	0	0
14	DF	(United States) Chad Marshall	2	0	0	0	0	0	0	0	0	2	0	0
15	DF	(Mexico) Tony Alfaro	4	0	0	0	0	0	0	0	0	4	0	0
17	FW	(United States) Will Bruin	1	0	0	0	0	0	1	0	0	2	0	0
18	DF	(Netherlands) Kelvin Leerdam	2	0	0	0	0	0	0	0	0	2	0	0
19	MF	(United States) Harry Shipp	1	0	0	0	0	0	0	0	0	1	0	0
21	MF	(Martinique) Jordy Delem	4	0	0	0	0	0	0	0	0	4	0	0
24	GK	(Switzerland) Stefan Frei	2	0	0	0	0	0	0	0	0	2	0	0
27	FW	(United States) Lamar Neagle	1	0	0	0	0	0	0	0	0	1	0	0
29	DF	(Panama) Roman Torres	4	0	0	2	0	0	0	0	0	6	0	0
33	DF	(Trinidad and Tobago) Joevin Jones	2	1	0	1	0	0	0	0	0	3	1	0
77	MF	(Panama) Francisco Narbón	0	0	0	0	0	0	0	0	1	0	0	1
91	DF	(Jamaica) Oniel Fisher	1	0	0	0	0	0	0	0	0	1	0	0
Players who left the club during the season:
8	MF	(Uruguay) Álvaro Fernández	1	0	0	0	0	0	0	0	0	1	0	0
Total			43	1	4	7	0	0	1	0	1	47	1	4

- Last updated: November 30, 2017
- Source: Disciplinary Stats

== Honors and awards ==
=== MLS Comeback Player of the Year ===
Player	Notes	Ref
(United States) Clint Dempsey	Successful 2017 campaign after an irregular heartbeat sidelined him for the second half of 2016.	

=== MLS Goal of the Week ===
Week	Player	Opponent	Ref
6	(Uruguay) Nicolás Lodeiro	San Jose Earthquakes	

=== MLS Save of the Week ===
Week	Player	Opponent	Ref
6	(Switzerland) Stefan Frei	San Jose Earthquakes	
10	(Switzerland) Stefan Frei	Toronto FC	
30	(Switzerland) Stefan Frei	Vancouver Whitecaps FC	

=== MLS Team of the Week ===
Week	Player	Opponent	Ref
5	(United States) Cristian Roldan	Atlanta United FC	
5	(Sweden) Gustav Svensson	Atlanta United FC	
8	(United States) Clint Dempsey	LA Galaxy	
8	(Uruguay) Nicolás Lodeiro	LA Galaxy	
13	(United States) Chad Marshall	Portland Timbers	
14	(Cuba) Osvaldo Alonso	Columbus Crew SC, Houston Dynamo	
19	(United States) Clint Dempsey	Colorado Rapids	
20	(United States) Cristian Roldan	D.C. United, San Jose Earthquakes	
22	(United States) Clint Dempsey	Minnesota United FC	
22	(Uruguay) Nicolás Lodeiro	Minnesota United FC	
23	(United States) Chad Marshall	Sporting Kansas City	
24	(United States) Chad Marshall	Minnesota United FC	
32	(United States) Will Bruin	FC Dallas	
33	(Panama) Román Torres	Colorado Rapids	
33	(Uruguay) Nicolás Lodeiro	Colorado Rapids	

=== MLS Coach of the Week ===
Week	Coach	Opponent	Ref
19	(United States) Brian Schmetzer	Colorado Rapids	

== Transfers ==
For transfers in, dates listed are when Sounders FC officially signed the players to the roster. Transactions where only the rights to the players are acquired are not listed. For transfers out, dates listed are when Sounders FC officially removed the players from its roster, not when they signed with another club. If a player later signed with another club, his new club will be noted, but the date listed here remains the one when he was officially removed from Sounders FC roster.

=== In ===
No.	Pos.	Player	Transferred from	Fee/notes	Date	Source
35	GK	(United States) Bryan Meredith	(United States) San Jose Earthquakes	Selected with 20th pick in 2016 MLS Re-Entry Draft	December 16, 2016	
19	MF	(United States) Harry Shipp	(Canada) Montreal Impact	Traded for allocation money	December 22, 2016	
17	FW	(United States) Will Bruin	(United States) Houston Dynamo	Traded for allocation money	December 23, 2016	
12	FW	(United States) Seyi Adekoya	(United States) UCLA	Signed HGP Deal	January 18, 2017	
23	MF	(United States) Henry Wingo	(United States) Washington	Signed HGP Deal	January 18, 2017	
5	DF	(Cameroon) Nouhou	(United States) Seattle Sounders FC 2	Free	January 26, 2017	
4	MF	(Sweden) Gustav Svensson	(China) Guangzhou R&F	Free	January 30, 2017	
21	MF	(Martinique) Jordy Delem	(United States) Seattle Sounders FC 2	Free	March 2, 2017	
32	MF	(United States) Zach Mathers	(United States) Seattle Sounders FC 2	Free	March 2, 2017	
18	DF	(Netherlands) Kelvin Leerdam	(Netherlands) SBV Vitesse	Free	July 10, 2017	
8	MF	(Spain) Víctor Rodríguez	(Spain) Sporting de Gijón	Free	August 2, 2017	
27	FW	(United States) Lamar Neagle	(United States) D.C. United	Traded for a fourth-round pick in the 2018 MLS SuperDraft	August 7, 2017	
16	MF	(Scotland) Calum Mallace	(Canada) Montreal Impact	Traded for a fourth-round pick in the 2019 MLS SuperDraft	August 9, 2017	

==== Draft picks ====
Draft picks are not automatically signed to the team roster. Only those who are signed to a contract will be listed as transfers in. Only trades involving draft picks and executed after the start of 2017 MLS SuperDraft will be listed in the notes.

Date	Player	Number	Position	Previous club	Notes	Ref
January 13, 2017	Brian Nana-Sinkam		DF	(United States) Stanford	MLS SuperDraft 1st Round Pick (#22)	
January 13, 2017	Dominic Oduro		DF	(Denmark) FC Nordsjælland	MLS SuperDraft 2nd Round Pick (#35)	
January 17, 2017	Doug Goodman		MF	(United States) Georgetown	MLS SuperDraft 3rd Round Pick (#56); Acquired from D.C. United in exchange for midfielder David Estrada	
January 17, 2017	Jake Stovall		DF	(United States) Wright State	MLS SuperDraft 3rd Round Pick (#66)	
January 17, 2017	Kyle Bjornethun		DF	(United States) Seattle University	MLS SuperDraft 4th Round Pick (#88)	

==== Out ====
No.	Pos.	Player	Transferred to	Fee/notes	Date	Source
39	FW	(Saint Vincent and the Grenadines) Oalex Anderson		Waived	December 12, 2016	
12	MF	(United States) Michael Farfan	Retired	Waived	December 12, 2016	
8	MF	(Sweden) Erik Friberg	(Sweden) BK Häcken	Waived	December 12, 2016	
9	FW	(United States) Herculez Gomez	Retired	Waived	December 12, 2016	
23	MF	(Austria) Andreas Ivanschitz	(Czech Republic) Viktoria Plzeň	Waived	December 12, 2016	
17	FW	(United States) Darwin Jones	(United States) Tampa Bay Rowdies	Waived	December 12, 2016	
31	DF	(Jamaica) Damion Lowe	(United States) Tampa Bay Rowdies	Waived	December 12, 2016	
22	GK	(United States) Charlie Lyon	(United States) Orange County SC	Waived	December 12, 2016	
4	DF	(England) Tyrone Mears	(United States) Atlanta United FC	Waived, Traded for $50k general allocation money	December 12, 2016	
5	DF	(United States) Jimmy Ockford	(United States) Reno 1868 FC	Waived	December 12, 2016	
15	DF	(United States) Dylan Remick	(United States) Houston Dynamo	Waived; Second pick in 2016 MLS Re-Entry Draft	December 12, 2016	
20	DF	(United States) Zach Scott	Retired	Waived	December 12, 2016	
18	MF	(United States) Nathan Sturgis		Waived	December 12, 2016	
16	FW	(Paraguay) Nelson Valdez	(Paraguay) Cerro Porteño	Waived	December 12, 2016	
80	FW	(United States) Victor Mansaray	(United States) FC Cincinnati	Out on Loan	February 6, 2017	
8	MF	(Uruguay) Álvaro Fernández	(Argentina) San Martín	End of Contract	July 10, 2017	
80	FW	(United States) Victor Mansaray	(Sweden) Umeå FC	Waived	August 10, 2017	

=== Staff ===
As of 6 February 2017

Executive
Majority owner	Adrian Hanauer
Minority owners	Joe Roth, Paul Allen, Drew Carey
Chief executive officer	Bart Wiley
General Manager	Garth Lagerwey
Coaching staff
Head coach	Brian Schmetzer
Assistant coach	Djimi Traoré
Assistant coach	Gonzalo Pineda
Goalkeeper coach	Tom Dutra
Head athletic trainer	Chris Cornish
Head Scout	Kurt Schmid

== Notes ==
A. ^{a} Players who are under contract with Seattle Sounders FC 2.
