= Lagerwey =

Lagerwey may refer to:

- Lagerwey Wind, Dutch wind turbine manufacturer
- Engelbertus Lagerwey (1880–1959), bishop of Deventer
- Garth Lagerwey (born 1972), retired American soccer goalkeeper and manager
- John Lagerwey (born 1946), American sinologist
