= Nouhou Tolo =

Cameroonian footballer (born 1997)

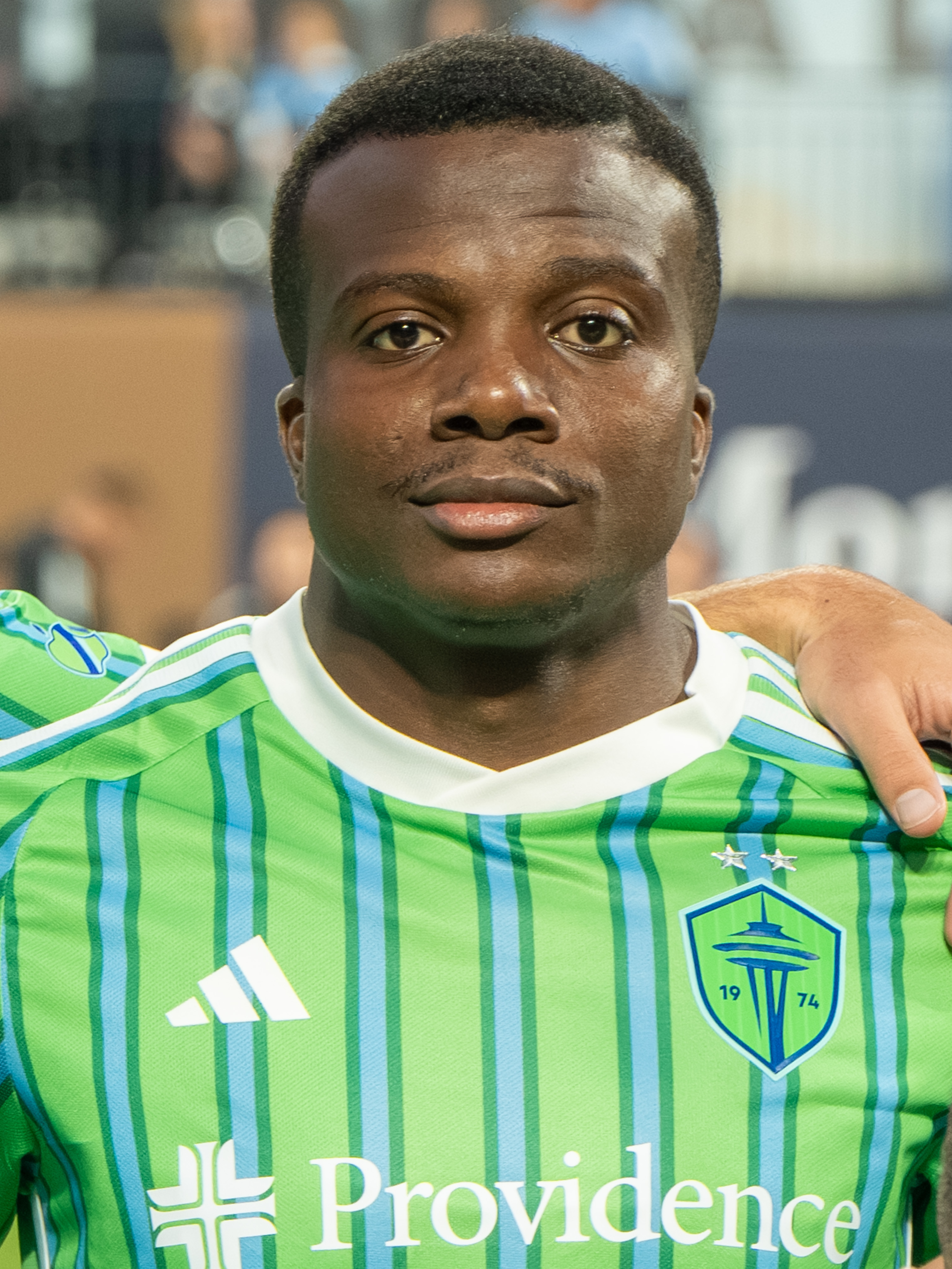
- Nouhou with Seattle Sounders FC in 2025

Personal information
- Full name: Nouhou Tolo
- Date of birth: 23 June 1997 (age 29)
- Place of birth: Douala, Cameroon
- Height: 1.78 m (5 ft 10 in)
- Position: Defender

Team information
- Current team: Seattle Sounders FC
- Number: 5

Senior career*
| Years | Team | Apps | (Gls) |
| 2015 | Rainbow Bamenda | | |
| 2016 | Seattle Sounders FC 2 | 24 | (0) |
| 2017– | Seattle Sounders FC | 222 | (2) |
| 2017–2018 | → Tacoma Defiance (loan) | 8 | (1) |

International career^{‡}
| 2017 | Cameroon U20 | 1 | (0) |
| 2019 | Cameroon U23 | 1 | (0) |
| 2017– | Cameroon | 48 | (1) |
Medal record
Men's football
Representing Cameroon
Africa Cup of Nations
| Third place | 2021 Cameroon |
- * Club domestic league appearances and goals as of 23:13, 18 October 2025 (UTC) ‡ National team caps and goals as of 9 January 2026

Nouhou Tolo (/ˈnuːhuː ˈtoʊloʊ/; born 23 June 1997), sometimes known mononymically as Nouhou, is a Cameroonian professional footballer who plays as a left-back for Major League Soccer club Seattle Sounders FC and captains the Cameroon national team.

Nouhou represented Cameroon at the Africa Cup of Nations in 2021, 2023 and 2025, as well as the 2022 FIFA World Cup.

== Club career ==
Nouhou began his career in 2015 with Rainbow Bamenda, where he played for one season. A contract dispute over who owned his rights between teams in Cameroon initially blocked his transfer to the United States, but in April 2016, Nouhou signed with Seattle Sounders FC 2. He made 24 league appearances and led the team in minutes played.

Nouhou signed with Seattle Sounders FC on 26 January 2017, earning his first team contract after performing well for reserve team S2 in 2016, according to General Manager Garth Lagerwey. Nouhou scored his first professional goal while loaned down to S2 on 15 April 2017, the second goal in a 2–1 away win over LA Galaxy II.

Nouhou made his Seattle Sounders FC debut on 31 May 2017, coming on as a substitute in a 3–0 loss to Columbus Crew. He became a fan favorite amongst Sounders FC supporters, often known for his showmanship during matches. Nouhou was named to the 2021 MLS All-Star Game roster. He scored his first goal for the Sounders against the Houston Dynamo on 4 September 2022. He also registered an assist in the game, earning Man of the Match honors.

== International career ==
In February 2017, Nouhou was called up to represent the Cameroon U20s in the 2017 Africa U-20 Cup of Nations in Zambia. Nouhou made his under-20 debut on 27 February 2017, starting at left back in a 3–1 loss against South Africa in the first group stage game of the tournament.

Nouhou made his debut for the Cameroon national team in a 2018 FIFA World Cup qualification 2–2 tie with Zambia on 11 November 2017.

On 9 November 2022, Nouhou was named in Cameroon's final 26-man squad for the 2022 FIFA World Cup in Qatar. He started all three matches for his country, including their historic 1–0 victory over Brazil.

On 28 December 2023, he was included in the list of twenty-seven Cameroonian players selected by coach Rigobert Song to compete at the 2023 Africa Cup of Nations.

Nouhou was included in the list of Cameroonian players selected by coach David Pagou to participate in the 2025 Africa Cup of Nations.

== Career statistics ==
=== Club ===
As of match played 18 October 2025

Appearances and goals by club, season and competition
| Club | Season | League | | | National cup | | Continental | | Other | | Total | |
| Club | Season | Division | Apps | Goals | Apps | Goals | Apps | Goals | Apps | Goals | Apps | Goals |
|---|---|---|---|---|---|---|---|---|---|---|---|---|
| Seattle Sounders FC 2 | 2016 | USL | 24 | 0 | — | | — | | — | | 24 | 0 |
| Seattle Sounders FC 2 | 2017 | USL | 6 | 1 | — | | — | | — | | 6 | 1 |
| Seattle Sounders FC 2 | 2018 | USL | 1 | 0 | — | | — | | — | | 1 | 0 |
| Seattle Sounders FC 2 | Total | | 31 | 1 | — | | — | | — | | 31 | 1 |
| Tacoma Defiance | 2019 | USL | 1 | 0 | — | | — | | — | | 1 | 0 |
| Seattle Sounders FC | 2017 | MLS | 19 | 0 | 2 | 0 | — | | 5 (Note: Appearance(s) in MLS Cup Playoffs) | 0 | 26 | 0 |
| Seattle Sounders FC | 2018 | MLS | 28 | 0 | — | | 1 (Note: Appearance(s) in CONCACAF Champions League) | 0 | 2 | 0 | 31 | 0 |
| Seattle Sounders FC | 2019 | MLS | 22 | 0 | 1 | 0 | — | | 2 | 0 | 25 | 0 |
| Seattle Sounders FC | 2020 | MLS | 22 | 0 | — | | 2 | 0 | 4 | 0 | 28 | 0 |
| Seattle Sounders FC | 2021 | MLS | 19 | 0 | — | | — | | — | | 19 | 0 |
| Seattle Sounders FC | 2022 | MLS | 30 | 1 | 1 | 0 | 7 | 0 | 0 | 0 | 38 | 1 |
| Seattle Sounders FC | 2023 | MLS | 28 | 0 | 0 | 0 | 0 | 0 | 6 (Note: Two appearances in Leagues Cup, four appearances in MLS Cup Playoffs) | 0 | 34 | 0 |
| Seattle Sounders FC | 2024 | MLS | 27 | 0 | 3 | 0 | — | | 8 (Note: Five appearances in Leagues Cup, three appearances in MLS Cup Playoffs) | 0 | 38 | 0 |
| Seattle Sounders FC | 2025 | MLS | 27 | 1 | 0 | 0 | 4 | 0 | 6 (Note: Two appearances in FIFA Club World Cup, four appearances and one goal in Leagues Cup) | 1 | 37 | 2 |
| Seattle Sounders FC | Total | | 222 | 2 | 7 | 0 | 14 | 0 | 33 | 1 | 276 | 3 |
| Career total | | | 232 | 2 | 7 | 0 | 14 | 0 | 33 | 1 | 308 | 3 |

=== International ===
As of match played 9 January 2026

Appearances and goals by national team and year
| National team | Year | Apps | Goals |
|---|---|---|---|
| Cameroon | 2017 | 1 | 0 |
| Cameroon | 2021 | 5 | 0 |
| Cameroon | 2022 | 15 | 0 |
| Cameroon | 2023 | 5 | 0 |
| Cameroon | 2024 | 11 | 1 |
| Cameroon | 2025 | 7 | 0 |
| Cameroon | 2026 | 2 | 0 |
| Total | | 46 | 1 |

== Personal life ==
Nouhou's family is originally from Mali and he has four siblings. He is Muslim and practiced fasting during Ramadan during his career with the Sounders.

== Honours ==
Seattle Sounders FC

- MLS Cup: 2019
- CONCACAF Champions League: 2022
- Leagues Cup: 2025

Cameroon

- Africa Cup of Nations bronze: 2021

Individual

- MLS All-Star: 2021
- CONCACAF Champions League Best XI: 2022
