= Jordy Delem =

French footballer (born 1993)

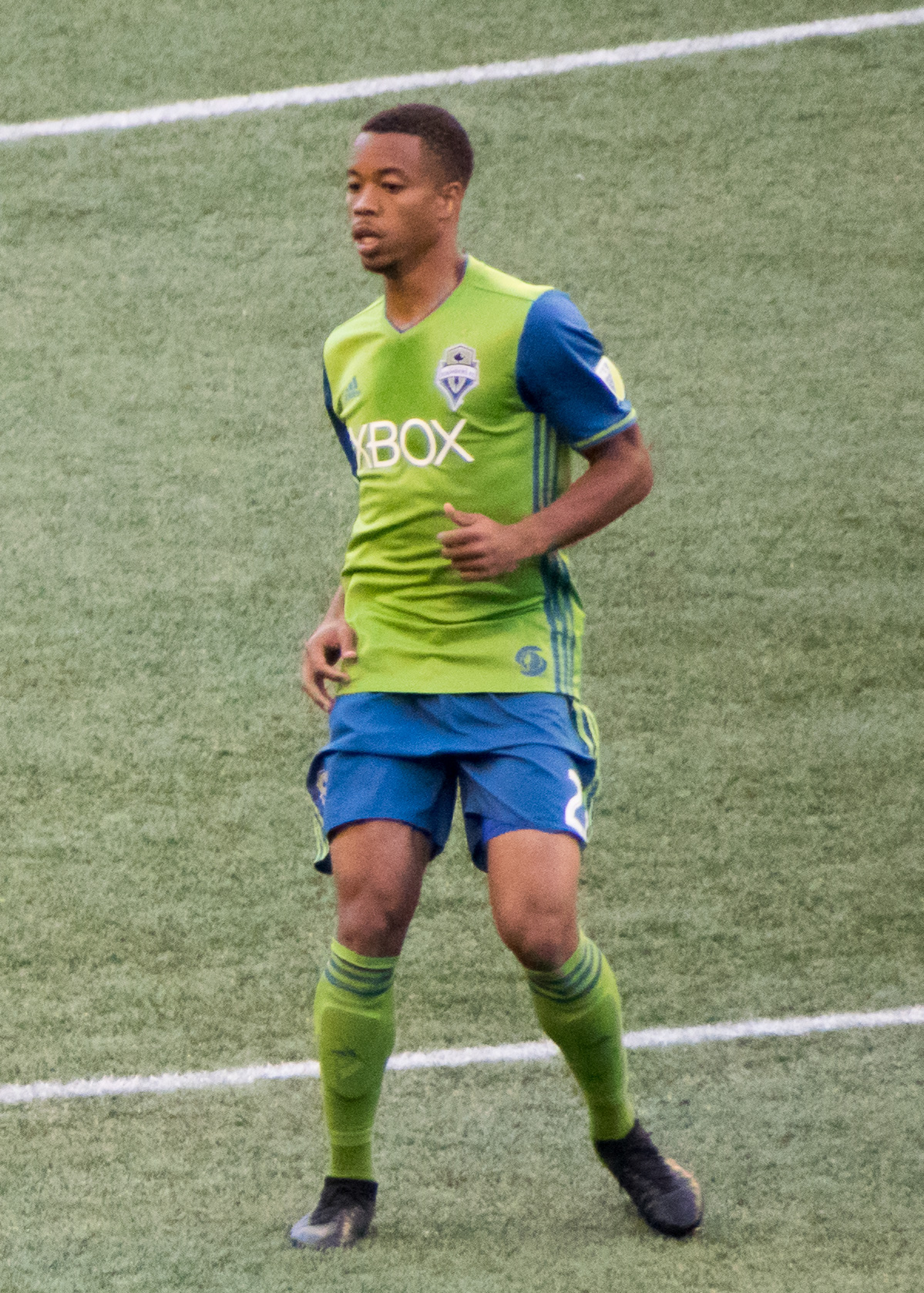
- Delem with Seattle Sounders FC in 2017

Personal information
- Full name: Jordy José Delem
- Date of birth: 18 March 1993 (age 33)
- Place of birth: Le François, Martinique, France
- Height: 1.80 m (5 ft 11 in)
- Position: Midfielder

Senior career*
Years	Team	Apps	(Gls)
2011–2015	Club Franciscain		
2015	Arles-Avignon B	11	(1)
2015–2016	Arles-Avignon	3	(0)
2016	Club Franciscain		
2016	Seattle Sounders FC 2	19	(0)
2017–2021	Seattle Sounders FC	74	(1)
2017–2021	→ Tacoma Defiance (loan)	10	(0)
2022	San Antonio FC	16	(0)

International career^{‡}
2012–2019	Martinique	45	(7)
- * Club domestic league appearances and goals as of 21 October 2022 ‡ National team caps and goals as of 15 November 2019

Jordy José Delem (born 18 March 1993) is a former French professional footballer who played as a midfielder. Besides Martinique, he has played in France and the United States.

== Club career ==
=== Professional ===
Delem started his senior career with Club Franciscain, whom he captained in 2014. In 2015, he joined French team AC Arles-Avignon. On 29 April 2016, he signed with USL club Seattle Sounders FC 2. He made his debut for the club two days later in a 1–1 draw against Oklahoma City Energy.

After making 19 appearances for Sounders 2, Delem signed a first team contract with Seattle Sounders FC on 2 March 2017. Delem made his Sounders debut on 31 March 2017, starting at right back in a 0–0 draw against Atlanta United FC.

Following the 2021 season, Seattle declined their contract option on Delem.

On 19 May 2022, Delem signed with San Antonio FC for the 2022 season.

== International career ==
Delem represented the Martinique national team at the 2013, 2017 and 2019 CONCACAF Gold Cup.

== Career statistics ==
=== Club ===
As of match played 13 May 2021

Appearances and goals by club, season and competition
Club	Season	League			National Cup		Continental		Other		Total	
Club	Season	Division	Apps	Goals	Apps	Goals	Apps	Goals	Apps	Goals	Apps	Goals
Arles-Avignon B	2014–15	Amateur 2	11	1	—		—		—		11	1
Arles-Avignon	2015–16	Amateur	3	0	2	0	—		—		5	0
Seattle Sounders FC 2	2016	USL	19	0	—		—		—		19	0
Seattle Sounders FC 2	2017	USL	5	0	—		—		—		5	0
Seattle Sounders FC 2	2018	USL	4	0	—		—		—		4	0
Tacoma Defiance	2019	USL	1	0	—		—		—		1	0
Tacoma Defiance	Total		29	0	0	0	0	0	0	0	29	0
Seattle Sounders FC	2017	MLS	14	0	1	0	—		2 (Note: Appearance(s) in MLS Cup Playoffs)	0	17	0
Seattle Sounders FC	2018	MLS	16	1	1	0	1 (Note: Appearance(s) in CONCACAF Champions League)	0	—		18	1
Seattle Sounders FC	2019	MLS	23	0	0	0	—		4	0	27	0
Seattle Sounders FC	2020	MLS	17	0	0	0	2	0	1	0	20	0
Seattle Sounders FC	2021	MLS	4	0	0	0	—		—		4	0
Seattle Sounders FC	Total		74	1	2	0	3	0	7	0	86	1
Career total			117	2	4	0	3	0	7	0	131	2

=== International ===
As of match played 14 November 2019

Appearances and goals by national team and year
National team	Year	Apps	Goals
Martinique	2012	14	3
Martinique	2013	1	0
Martinique	2014	8	0
Martinique	2015	1	0
Martinique	2016	6	2
Martinique	2017	5	0
Martinique	2018	3	0
Martinique	2019	7	2
Total		45	7

=== International goals ===
Scores and results list Martinique's goal tally first.

No	Date	Venue	Opponent	Score	Result	Competition
1.	2 May 2012	Stade Omnisports, Le Lamentin, Martinique	Guyana	2–1	2–2	Friendly
2.	5 September 2012	Stade Omnisports, Le Lamentin, Martinique	British Virgin Islands	1–0	16–0	2012 Caribbean Cup qualification
3.	5 September 2012	Stade Omnisports, Le Lamentin, Martinique	British Virgin Islands	10–0	16–0	2012 Caribbean Cup qualification
4.	6 February 2016	Stade Municipal de Vieux-Habitants, Vieux-Habitants, Guadeloupe	Guadeloupe	1–1	1–1	Friendly
5.	7 June 2016	Windsor Park, Roseau, Dominica	Dominica	2–0	4–0	2017 Caribbean Cup qualification
6.	23 June 2019	Bank of America Stadium, Charlotte, United States	Mexico	2–3	2–3	2019 CONCACAF Gold Cup
7.	9 September 2019	Hasely Crawford Stadium, Port of Spain, Trinidad and Tobago	Trinidad and Tobago	2–2	2–2	2019–20 CONCACAF Nations League A

== Honours ==
=== Club ===
Seattle Sounders FC

- MLS Cup: 2019
