= Víctor Rodríguez (Spanish footballer) =

Spanish footballer (born 1989)

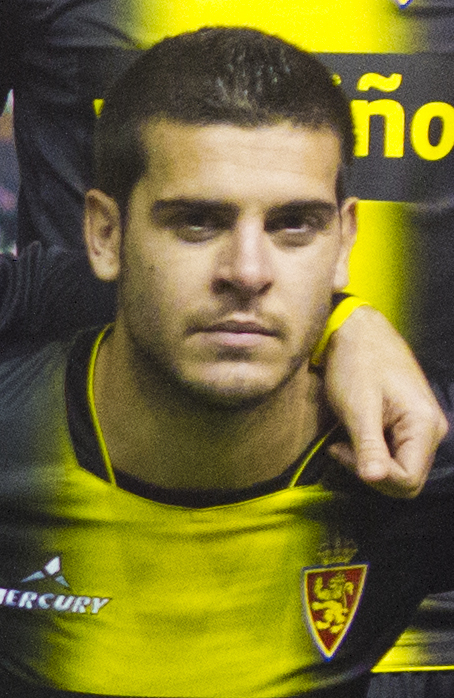
- Rodríguez with Zaragoza in 2012

Personal information
- Full name: Víctor Rodríguez Romero
- Date of birth: 23 July 1989 (age 37)
- Place of birth: Barberà del Vallès, Spain
- Height: 1.70 m (5 ft 7 in)
- Position: Winger

Youth career
- 1998–2002: Barcelona
- 2002–2005: Mercantil
- 2005–2008: Badalona

Senior career*
Years	Team	Apps	(Gls)
2008–2012	Badalona	85	(8)
2008–2009	→ Vilajuïga (loan)	36	(11)
2012	Zaragoza B	1	(0)
2012–2014	Zaragoza	72	(6)
2014–2016	Elche	36	(4)
2015–2016	→ Getafe (loan)	33	(2)
2016–2017	Sporting Gijón	25	(2)
2017–2019	Seattle Sounders	43	(9)
2020–2021	Elche	22	(0)
2022–2023	Odisha	14	(1)
2023–2024	Goa	9	(3)
Total		376	(46)

International career
2015–2016	Catalonia	2	(0)
- * Club domestic league appearances and goals

Víctor Rodríguez Romero (born 23 July 1989) is a Spanish former professional footballer who played as a winger.

== Club career ==
Born in Barberà del Vallès, Barcelona, Catalonia, Rodríguez played four years with FC Barcelona as a youth, sharing teams with future Valencia CF, Barcelona and Spain star Jordi Alba. Both were released for being deemed too small.

Rodríguez then signed for neighbours CF Badalona in the Segunda División B, going on to spend three full seasons at that level with the club. In 2012 he joined Real Zaragoza of La Liga, but initially as a member of the reserve team also in the third tier. He was introduced in the main squad setup by manager Manolo Jiménez shortly after, however, making his league debut on 25 August in a 2–1 away win against RCD Espanyol.

On 21 October 2012, in another 2–1 away victory, now over Granada CF, Rodríguez scored once and also provided the assist in Hélder Postiga's opener. As he had played in the number of first-team games required, he was immediately handed a professional contract, running until June 2015.

Rodríguez returned to the top flight on 7 August 2014, after agreeing to a three-year deal at Elche CF. On 2 August of the following year, he was loaned to Getafe CF of the same league for one year.

On 10 June 2016, after Getafe's relegation, Rodríguez signed a four-year contract with Sporting de Gijón also in the top tier. He met the same fate at the end of the season, then agreed to terminate his contract in order to join a Major League Soccer team, which turned out to be Seattle Sounders FC.

On 10 November 2019, Rodríguez was named the MVP of the MLS Cup final, scoring the Sounders' second goal in a 3–1 home win over Toronto FC. The following 30 January, he returned to his former club Elche.

Rodríguez signed with Odisha FC in the Indian Super League in July 2022. He scored his first league goal on 17 February 2023, in the 3–1 away defeat of NorthEast United FC. He also won that year's Super Cup with the side.

On 20 July 2023, Rodríguez joined FC Goa on a one-year deal. In August 2024, he announced his retirement aged 35.

== International career ==
Rodríguez featured for the Catalonia unofficial team.

== Career statistics ==
Appearances and goals by club, season and competition
Club	Season	League			National cup		Continental		Other		Total	
Club	Season	Division	Apps	Goals	Apps	Goals	Apps	Goals	Apps	Goals	Apps	Goals
Badalona	2009–10	Segunda División B	25	1	0	0	—		—		25	1
Badalona	2010–11	Segunda División B	34	3	0	0	—		3 (Note: Appearances in Segunda División B play-offs)	0	37	3
Badalona	2011–12	Segunda División B	26	4	0	0	—		2	0	28	4
Badalona	Total		85	8	0	0	0	0	5	0	90	8
Vilajuïga (loan)	2008–09	Tercera División	?	?	0	0	—		—		0	0
Zaragoza B	2012–13	Segunda División B	1	0	0	0	—		—		1	0
Zaragoza	2012–13	La Liga	33	1	5 (Note: Appearances in Copa del Rey)	0	—		—		38	1
Zaragoza	2013–14	Segunda División	39	5	0	0	—		—		39	5
Zaragoza	Total		72	6	5	0	0	0	0	0	77	6
Elche	2014–15	La Liga	36	4	2	0	—		—		38	4
Getafe (loan)	2015–16	La Liga	33	2	1	0	—		—		34	2
Sporting Gijón	2016–17	La Liga	25	2	2	0	—		—		27	2
Seattle Sounders	2017	Major League Soccer	7	2	0	0	—		4 (Note: Appearances in MLS Cup playoffs)	1	11	1
Seattle Sounders	2018	Major League Soccer	19	5	0	0	0	0	2	0	21	5
Seattle Sounders	2019	Major League Soccer	17	2	1 (Note: Appearance in U.S. Open Cup)	1	—		3	1	21	4
Seattle Sounders	Total		43	9	1	1	0	0	9	2	53	12
Elche	2019–20	Segunda División	6	0	0	0	—		2 (Note: Appearances in La Liga play-offs)	0	8	0
Elche	2020–21	La Liga	16	0	3	0	—		—		19	0
Elche	Total		22	0	3	0	0	0	2	0	27	0
Odisha	2022–23	Indian Super League	14	1	5 (Note: Appearances in Super Cup)	2	—		1 (Note: Appearance in AFC Cup playoffs)	0	20	3
Goa	2023–24	Indian Super League	9	3	0	0	—		—		9	3
Career total			340	35	19	3	0	0	17	2	376	40

== Honours ==
Seattle Sounders

- MLS Cup: 2019

Odisha

- Super Cup: 2023

Individual

- MLS Cup MVP: 2019
