= Henry Wingo =

American soccer player (born 1995)

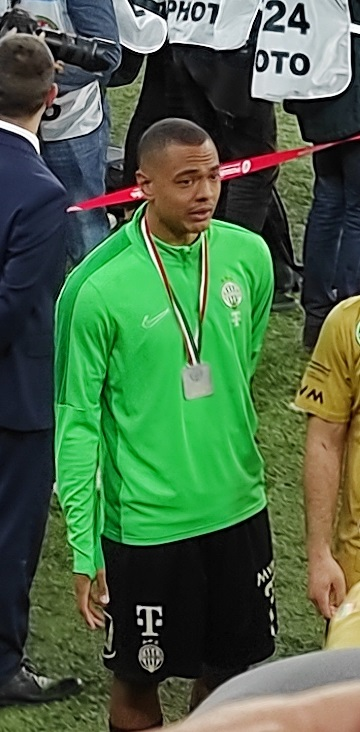
- Wingo with Ferencváros in 2024

Personal information
- Full name: Henry Swenson Wingo
- Date of birth: October 4, 1995 (age 31)
- Place of birth: Seattle, Washington, United States
- Height: 6 ft 0 in (1.83 m)
- Positions: Midfielder; wing-back

Youth career
- 2012–2014: Seattle Sounders FC

College career
Years	Team	Apps	(Gls)
2014–2016	Washington Huskies	58	(2)

Senior career*
Years	Team	Apps	(Gls)
2015	Puget Sound Gunners	2	(0)
2017–2019	Seattle Sounders FC	22	(0)
2017–2019	→ Tacoma Defiance (loan)	31	(6)
2019–2020	Molde	23	(2)
2021–2024	Ferencváros	58	(1)
2024–2026	Toronto FC	11	(0)
- * Club domestic league appearances and goals as of July 1, 2026

Henry Swenson Wingo (born October 4, 1995) is an American professional soccer player who plays as a midfielder or wing-back.

== Early life ==
Wingo spent time as a youth playing for Northwest Nationals and Crossfire FC. Wingo then played for two seasons as part of the Seattle Sounders Academy where he scored 12 goals.

== College career ==
Wingo played for three seasons at the University of Washington. During his time at UW, Wingo scored two goals and added four assists in 58 matches. With his efforts he earned All-Pac-12 Second Team honors in 2015 and 2016.

== Club career ==
=== Pudget Sound Genners ===
Wingo played in the Premier Development League for Puget Sound Gunners.

=== Seattle Sounders FC ===
In January 2017, Wingo was signed as a Homegrown Player by Seattle Sounders FC in Major League Soccer. Wingo made his professional debut on March 4, coming on as a substitute during the first game of the 2017 season in a 2–1 loss to Houston.

=== Molde FK ===
On August 12, 2019, Wingo moved to Norwegian Eliteserien side Molde FK, reuniting him with former Sounder Magnus Wolff Eikrem. He made his debut for the club on October 21, when he came in as an 89th-minute substitute in Molde's 3–1 win against Haugesund. In 1 1/2 seasons with Molde, Wingo made 23 league appearances and scored two goals in the Eliteserien. He made a further 8 appearances for the club in both the UEFA Europa League and the UEFA Champions League.

=== Ferencváros ===
On January 18, 2021, Ferencváros announced through its Twitter account that the club had signed Wingo from Molde. Wingo made his debut for the club on January 27, coming on in the 80th minute in a 3–0 win against Budafoki MTE.

On May 5, 2023, he won the 2022–23 Nemzeti Bajnokság I with Ferencváros, after Kecskemét lost 1–0 to Honvéd at the Bozsik Aréna on the 30th matchday. At the end of the 2023–24 Nemzeti Bajnokság I season, he left the club.

=== Toronto FC ===
After leaving Ferencváros, Wingo subsequently signed with Major League Soccer side Toronto FC on July 18, 2024. On July 3, 2026, Toronto FC bought out the remainder of his contract.

== Personal life ==
Wingo's brother, Teddy, played professionally in Norway for Stryn FK. Henry grew up in Lake Forest Park, Washington, a suburb of Seattle. Since the age of 3, Henry and his brothers Teddy and Connor were raised by their single mother Erica. Henry Wingo attended Shorecrest High School in Shoreline, Washington.

== Career statistics ==
As of match played February 21, 2026

Appearances and goals by club, season and competition
Club	Season	League			National cup (Note: Includes U.S. Open Cup, Norwegian Cup, Magyar Kupa and Canadian Championship)		Continental		Other		Total	
Club	Season	Division	Apps	Goals	Apps	Goals	Apps	Goals	Apps	Goals	Apps	Goals
Seattle Sounders 2	2017	USL Championship	12	2	–		–		–		12	2
Seattle Sounders 2	2018	USL Championship	12	3	–		–		–		12	3
Seattle Sounders 2	2019	USL Championship	7	1	–		–		–		12	3
Seattle Sounders 2	Total		31	6	–		–		–		31	6
Seattle Sounders FC	2017	Major League Soccer	11	0	2	0	–		1 (Note: Appearance in MLS Cup playoffs)	0	14	0
Seattle Sounders FC	2018	Major League Soccer	5	0	1	0	4 (Note: Appearances in CONCACAF Champions League)	0	0	0	10	0
Seattle Sounders FC	2019	Major League Soccer	6	0	1	0	–		0	0	7	0
Seattle Sounders FC	Total		22	0	4	0	4	0	1	0	31	0
Molde	2019	Eliteserien	3	0	0	0	0	0	–		3	0
Molde	2020	Eliteserien	20	2	0	0	8 (Note: Three appearances in UEFA Champions League, five appearances in UEFA Europa League)	0	–		28	2
Molde	Total		23	2	0	0	8	0	–		31	2
Ferencváros	2020–21	NB I	12	0	0	0	0	0	–		12	0
Ferencváros	2021–22	NB I	21	0	3	0	12 (Note: Eight appearances and one goal in UEFA Champions League, four appearances in UEFA Europa League)	1	–		36	1
Ferencváros	2022–23	NB I	14	0	2	0	12 (Note: Three appearances in UEFA Champions League, nine appearances in UEFA Europa League)	0	–		28	0
Ferencváros	2023–24	NB I	11	1	2	0	2 (Note: Appearances in UEFA Europa Conference League)	0	–		15	1
Ferencváros	Total		58	1	7	0	26	1	–		91	2
Toronto FC	2024	Major League Soccer	4	0	1	0	–		2 (Note: Appearances in Leagues Cup)	0	7	0
Toronto FC	2025	Major League Soccer	6	0	0	0	–		–		6	0
Toronto FC	2026	Major League Soccer	1	0	0	0	–		–		1	0
Toronto FC	Total		11	0	1	0	–		2	0	14	0
Career total			145	9	12	0	38	1	3	0	198	10

== Honors ==
Molde

- Eliteserien: 2019

Ferencváros

- Nemzeti Bajnokság I: 2020–21, 2021–22, 2022–23
- Magyar Kupa: 2021–22

Individual

- All-Pac-12 Selection: Second Team 2015, 2016
