= Handwalla Bwana =

Somali footballer (born 1999)

Personal information
- Date of birth: June 25, 1999 (age 27)
- Place of birth: Mombasa, Kenya
- Height: 1.80 m (5 ft 11 in)
- Positions: Attacking midfielder; winger

Team information
- Current team: Real Monarchs on loan from Las Vegas Lights

Youth career
- 2015–2016: Seattle Sounders FC

College career
Years	Team	Apps	(Gls)
2016–2017	Washington Huskies	39	(12)

Senior career*
Years	Team	Apps	(Gls)
2015–2020	Tacoma Defiance (Note: Tacoma Defiance were known as Seattle Sounders FC 2.)	16	(1)
2018–2020	Seattle Sounders FC	32	(4)
2020–2022	Nashville SC	7	(0)
2022	→ Memphis 901 (loan)	4	(1)
2023	Charleston Battery	0	(0)
2024	PDX FC	1	(0)
2025	South Georgia Tormenta	21	(3)
2026–	Las Vegas Lights	2	(0)
2026–	→ Real Monarchs (loan)	0	(0)

International career^{‡}
2025–	Somalia	1	(0)
- * Club domestic league appearances and goals as of 2 September 2026 ‡ National team caps and goals as of 13:33, 11 September 2025 (UTC)

Handwalla Bwana (born June 25, 1999) is a Somali professional footballer who plays as a winger for Real Monarchs in MLS Next Pro on loan from USL Championship club Las Vegas Lights. At the international level he has represented the Somalia national team.

== Early life ==
Bwana was born a Somali refugee in Mombasa, Kenya, spending the first six years of his childhood at a refugee camp in Kakuma in northwestern Kenya. His family resettled in the United States in 2010, initially in Atlanta, but later in Seattle, where he attended Ballard High School.

Bwana said "I fell in love with the game because my dad played it. My dad was a professional in Somalia". Describing how his childhood shaped him as a player, Bwana has stated that "playing with a garbage ball...made me better with my feet".

== Career ==
Bwana joined the Seattle Sounders FC Academy in 2015. On September 11, 2015, Bwana made his professional debut for USL club Seattle Sounders FC 2 in a 1–0 defeat to the Orange County Blues. He spent two seasons at the University of Washington.

Bwana was signed by the Sounders MLS side as a Homegrown Player on January 11, 2018. Bwana made his debut for the club against expansion side Los Angeles FC as a substitute on March 4, 2018, an appearance which included a shot from outside the box that hit the crossbar. He started Seattle's CONCACAF Champions League quarterfinal tie against Mexican club Chivas three days later, but did not appear in the second leg in Guadalajara, as Seattle lost 3–1 on aggregate. Bwana started his first MLS game against FC Dallas on March 18, 2018, a 3–0 defeat. His first goal was on May 9, 2018, the game winner against Toronto FC, and scored again a week later against Orlando City SC.

The Sounders traded Bwana to Nashville SC on October 21, 2020, in exchange for Jimmy Medranda and $225,000 of General Allocation Money. On August 19, 2022, Bwana joined USL Championship side Memphis 901 on loan for the remainder of the 2022 season. On January 10, 2023, Bwana and Nashville mutually agreed to part ways. The following day, the player officially joined USL Championship side Charleston Battery on a free transfer. After missing the entire season due to injury, he left Charleston following the 2023 season. Bwana signed with Tormenta FC of USL League One in January 2025. Due to Tormenta's withdraw from USL League One, Bwana left the club.

On 20 February 2026, Bwana signed for the Las Vegas Lights in the USL Championship. In September 2026, Real Monarchs announced they had acquired Bwana on loan from Las Vegas Lights for the remainder of the 2026 MLS Next Pro season.

== International career ==
Bwana was called up to the Somalia national team for a set of 2026 FIFA World Cup qualification matches in September 2025.

== Career statistics ==
=== Club ===
As of match played 30 November 2020

Appearances and goals by club, season and competition
Club	Season	League			National Cup		Continental		Other		Total	
Club	Season	Division	Apps	Goals	Apps	Goals	Apps	Goals	Apps	Goals	Apps	Goals
Seattle Sounders FC 2	2015	USL	1	0	—		—		—		1	0
Seattle Sounders FC 2	2016	USL	5	0	—		—		—		5	0
Seattle Sounders FC 2	2018	USL	4	0	—		—		—		4	0
Tacoma Defiance	2019	USL	6	1	—		—		—		6	1
Tacoma Defiance	2020	USL	0	0	—		—		—		0	0
Tacoma Defiance	Total		16	1	0	0	0	0	0	0	16	1
Seattle Sounders FC	2018	MLS	12	2	—		1 (Note: Appearance(s) in CONCACAF Champions League)	0	1 (Note: Appearance(s) in MLS Cup Playoffs)	0	14	2
Seattle Sounders FC	2019	MLS	15	1	1	0	—		0	0	16	1
Seattle Sounders FC	2020	MLS	5	1	—		0	0	—		5	1
Seattle Sounders FC	Total		32	4	1	0	1	0	1	0	35	4
Nashville SC	2020	MLS	2	0	—		—		2	0	4	0
Career total			50	5	1	0	1	0	3	0	55	5

== Honours ==
Seattle Sounders FC

- MLS Cup: 2019
