= Michael Nelson (soccer, born 1994) =

American soccer player

Personal information
- Full name: Michael Jared Nelson
- Date of birth: August 8, 1994 (age 32)
- Place of birth: Austin, Texas, United States
- Height: 1.85 m (6 ft 1 in)
- Position: Defender

Team information
- Current team: Seattle Sounders FC 2
- Number: 36

Youth career
- 2010–2012: Lonestar SC

College career
Years	Team	Apps	(Gls)
2012	NC State Wolfpack	10	(0)
2013–2015	Old Dominion Monarchs	54	(4)

Senior career*
Years	Team	Apps	(Gls)
2015	Virginia Beach City FC		
2016	Seattle Sounders FC 2	19	(0)
- * Club domestic league appearances and goals as of October 13, 2016

Michael Jared Nelson (born August 8, 1994) is an American soccer player who played for Seattle Sounders FC 2 in the USL.

== Career ==
=== Youth and college ===
Nelson played club soccer for Lonestar SC before signing a letter of intent to play college soccer at NC State University. However, his time with the Wolfpack was cut short after making 10 appearances in 2012. On October 18, it was announced that Nelson, along with teammates Nader Jaibat, Monbo Bokar and Jonathan Ray, were dismissed from the team following their arrests at a Sports Bar.

Following his dismissal from NC State, Nelson transferred to Old Dominion University. He made a total of 54 appearances for the Monarchs and tallied four goals and four assists. In 2015, he was named First Team NSCAA All-Southeast, First Team All-C-USA and Second Team VaSID All-State.

=== Professional ===
On January 19, 2016, Nelson was drafted in the fourth round (76th overall) of the 2016 MLS SuperDraft by Seattle Sounders FC. However, he didn't make the team and on March 9, he signed a professional contract with USL affiliate club Seattle Sounders FC 2. He made his professional debut on April 17 in a 1–0 victory over Colorado Springs Switchbacks.
