= Willy Kapawa =

Cameroonian footballer (born 1993)

Personal information
- Full name: Willy Edgar Yapewouo Kapawa
- Date of birth: 24 June 1993 (age 33)
- Place of birth: Douala, Cameroon
- Height: 1.84 m (6 ft 0 in)
- Position: Centre-back

Team information
- Current team: Dynamic Herb Cebu
- Number: 92

Youth career
- Summer Little
- DAGA Young Stars

Senior career*
Years	Team	Apps	(Gls)
2013–2016	Lion Blessé		
2016–2017	Seattle Sounders FC 2	14	(0)
2017	Sounders Reserves		
2017–2019	Baltimore Celtic		
2019–2021	Maryland Bobcats		
2023–2026	Khosilot Farkhor	51	(0)
2026–	Dynamic Herb Cebu	4	(0)
- * Club domestic league appearances and goals as of 13:58, 13 March 2026 (UTC)

Willy Edgar Yapewouo Kapawa (born 24 June 1993) is a Cameroonian professional footballer who plays as a centre-back or centre midfielder for Philippines Football League club Cebu.

== Club career ==
=== Cameroon ===
Kapawa was born and grew up in Douala, Cameroon. Starting football from age 5, he played first in Summer Little Academy before playing for youth club Daga Young Stars. After playing in various youth tournaments abroad, starting in 2013 he played for the senior team of Lion Blessé. In 2015, with Kapawa playing, the club was promoted to the Elite One.

=== United States ===
In 2016, Kapawa moved to the United States, signing for Tacoma Defiance, then called Seattle Sounders 2. After a season and fourteen appearances, he was transferred to the reserves of the senior team. In 2017, he left after his contract expired.

Later that year, Kapawa transferred to Baltimore Celtic Soccer Club, where he stayed for two years. For two years after that he played with National Independent Soccer Association side Maryland Bobcats (then called World Class Premier Elite FC), eventually becoming the team's captain.

=== Tajikistan ===
Kapawa wouldn't play football for two years, before earning a move to Tajikistan in 2023, signing with Khosilot Farkhor of the Tajikistan Higher League, Tajikistan's highest division of football. He played with the club for three years and made 51 appearances, before departing at the start of 2026 upon the expiration of his contract.

=== Philippines ===
After leaving Khosilot, Kapawa moved to Dynamic Herb Cebu based in the Philippines Football League as one of the club's winter signings. He made his debut in the club's first home game of the season, where they won over Philippine Army.

== International career ==
=== Cameroon U20 ===
In 2011, Kapawa was called up the under-20 Cameroon national team for a training camp before the 2011 African U-20 Championship. Though he didn't make the final cut, he joined the team again later in the year in preparation for the 2011 FIFA U-20 World Cup.
