= Garth Lagerwey =

American soccer executive and former player

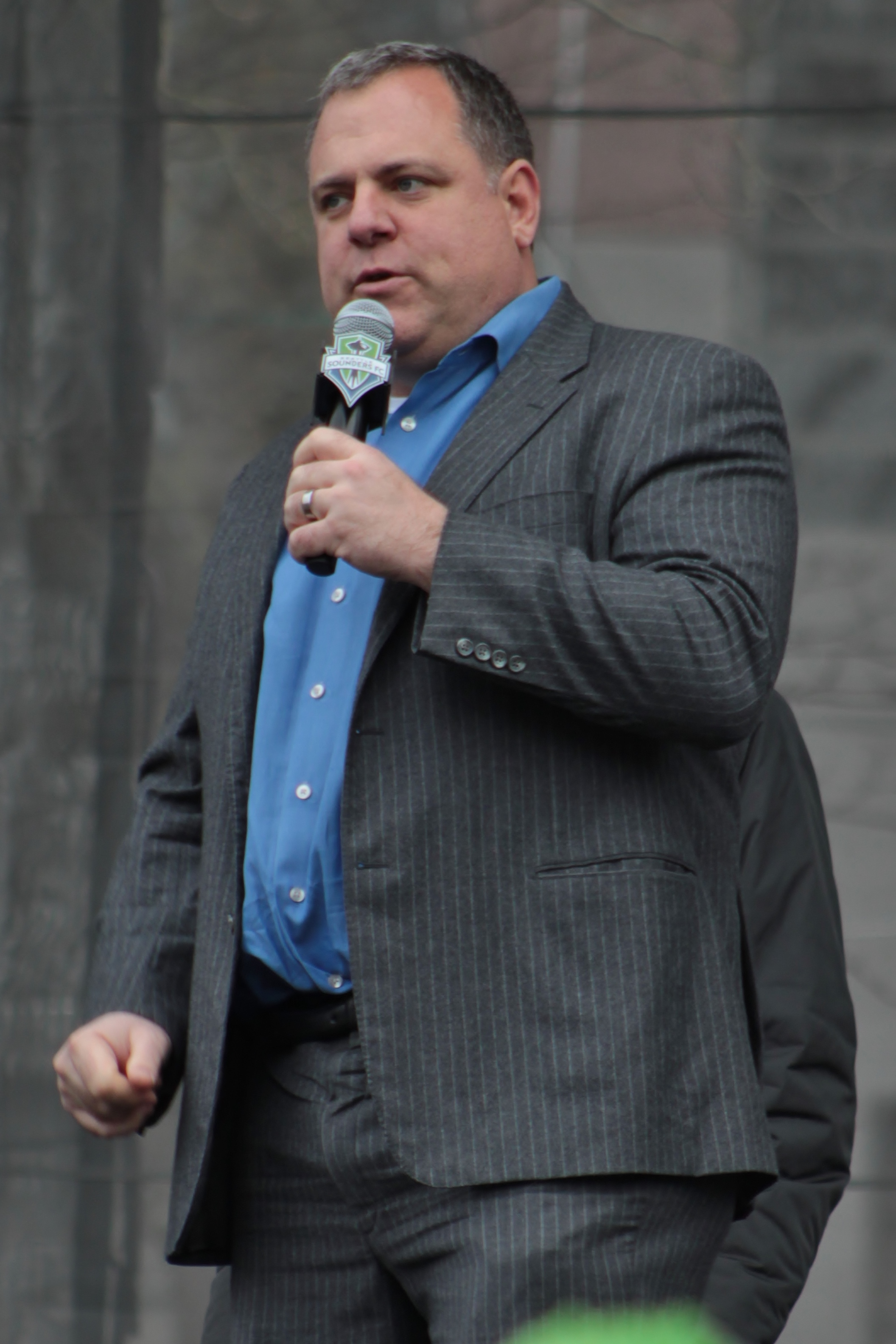
- Lagerwey in 2016

Personal information
- Full name: Garth E. Lagerwey
- Date of birth: December 12, 1972 (age 53)
- Place of birth: Elmhurst, Illinois, U.S.
- Height: 6 ft 0 in (1.83 m)
- Position: Goalkeeper

Youth career
- 1990–1991: SC Freiburg

College career
Years	Team	Apps	(Gls)
1991–1994	Duke Blue Devils		

Senior career*
Years	Team	Apps	(Gls)
1993	Raleigh Flyers		
1994	New Orleans		
1995	Hampton Roads Mariners		
1996	Kansas City Wiz	23	(0)
1997–1998	Dallas Burn	10	(0)
1997	→ Hershey Wildcats (loan)	3	(0)
1998	→ New Orleans (loan)	1	(0)
1999–2000	Miami Fusion	18	(0)
2000	→ MLS Pro 40 (loan)	4	(0)
- * Club domestic league appearances and goals

Garth Lagerwey (born December 12, 1972) is an American retired soccer player who played five seasons in Major League Soccer as a goalkeeper. He became the general manager of Real Salt Lake in 2007 and stayed with the club before departing in 2015 for Seattle Sounders FC, where he served as general manager and president of soccer for seven years. Lagerwey worked for Atlanta United FC as its president and CEO from November 2022 until 2025.

== Youth ==
Lagerwey grew up in Elmhurst, Illinois, a suburb of Chicago, and played club soccer with the Chicago Magic. He attended York High School, where he was a two time all-state soccer goalkeeper. After graduating from high school in 1990, he moved to Germany and signed with SC Freiburg, spending a season with the reserve team before returning to the United States. Lagerwey entered Duke University and played on the men's soccer team from 1991 to 1994. He graduated in 1995 with a bachelor's degree in history.

== Playing career ==
In 1993, Lagerwey spent the collegiate off-season with the Raleigh Flyers in the USISL. He then played the 1994 season with the New Orleans Riverboat Gamblers, also in the USISL. In 1995, he signed with the Hampton Roads Mariners.

In February 1996, D.C. United selected Lagerwey in the 15th round (150th overall) of the 1996 MLS Inaugural Player Draft. United then traded him to the Kansas City Wiz in exchange for Jeff Causey. Lagerwey was Kansas City's starting goalkeeper for much of the season, playing 23 games. In 1997, he moved to the Dallas Burn where he played only ten games over two seasons before being waived on October 31, 1998. In 1997, the Burn sent him on loan to the Hershey Wildcats and in 1998, he went on loan to the Gamblers. The Colorado Rapids selected Lagerwey in the November 1998 waiver draft, but was waived on February 23, 1999. He then signed with the Miami Fusion where he played mostly as a backup, but still entered 18 games to replace Jeff Cassar during injury spells. The team waived him at the end of the 2000 season. Lagerwey retired from playing in 2000, having made 51 appearances in his five-year MLS career.

== Media and law ==
In 2000, Lagerwey became a guest columnist with Sports Illustrated while playing in Miami. He graduated from the Georgetown University Law School in 2004 and was hired as an attorney with Latham & Watkins. Lagerwey also worked as a television and radio commentator for D.C. United from 2001 to 2007 and later the New England Revolution.

== Management ==
On September 19, 2007, Real Salt Lake (RSL) announced Lagerwey was hired as the team's senior vice president and general manager, reuniting with Duke University teammate Jason Kreis, who had been named head coach in May. He was hired by Dave Checketts through his attempt to sell a stake in the St. Louis Blues hockey team, which was handled by Latham & Watkins. At 35 years old, Lagerwey became the youngest general manager in MLS. RSL went on to qualify for their first playoffs and win an MLS Cup title in 2009. The club then finished as runners-up in the 2010–11 CONCACAF Champions League and MLS Cup 2013.

Lagerwey left RSL in December 2014 after seven seasons and moved to conference rivals Seattle Sounders FC amid other offers from MLS clubs. He was retained by club members in their 2018 and 2022 votes by large margins. Since 2015, the Sounders have won two MLS Cup titles and the 2022 CONCACAF Champions League. In 2022, Lagerwey won the Best Executive Award at the World Football Summit.

On November 22, 2022, Atlanta United FC announced that it had hired Lagerwey as its president and CEO, replacing Darren Eales after his departure for Newcastle United F.C. The announcement came a week after Lagerwey was retained by a vote of Sounders club members. Lagerwey held the role into 2025, when he did not return to the position after two rounds of medical leave for cancer treatment. In March 2026, Lagerwey returned to Atlanta United's stadium cancer-free.
