= Peter Klein =

Peter Klein may refer to:

- Peter Klein (athlete) (born 1959), West German sprinter
- Peter D. Klein (born 1940), American professor of philosophy
- Peter W. Klein (born 1970), American journalist and documentary filmmaker
- Peter G. Klein (born 1966), American professor of economics
- Peter Klein (tenor) (1907–1992), German tenor
- Peter Klein (CFO), Microsoft executive
- Peter Klein (impresario) (born 1945), American impresario
