= Amy Hood =

American businesswoman (born 1971)

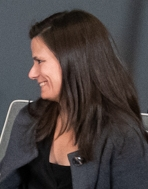
- Hood in 2021
- Born: August 9, 1971 (age 55)
- Education: Duke University (BA); Harvard University (MBA)
- Title: Chief Financial Officer of Microsoft
- Term: December 2013–present
- Predecessor: Peter Klein

Amy Hood (born August 9, 1971) is an American business executive and has been the executive vice president and chief financial officer of Microsoft since 2013. Hood is the first female chief financial officer in Microsoft's history.

== Early life and education ==
For the first 12 years of her life, Hood grew up in Morehead, Kentucky and then in Nashville, Tennessee. Her father was a medical doctor, and her mother taught nursing. She has a sister who is a pediatrician. She was on the math team in school.

Hood holds a bachelor's degree in economics from Duke University in 1994 and an MBA from Harvard University.

== Career ==
Hood joined Microsoft in 2002, holding positions in the investor relations group. She also served as chief of staff in the Server and Tools Business, as well as running the strategy and business development team in the Business division. Previously, she worked at Goldman Sachs in various roles, including investment banking and capital markets groups.

On 8 May 2013, Microsoft announced Hood would be replacing Peter Klein as the company's chief financial officer, making her the first female to hold the role in the company's history. She was characterized as operationally-focused and capable of managing costs. In her role, she has overseen over 57 deals, including the $7.5 billion acquisition of GitHub in 2018. She was credited for shifting funding away from the company's legacy divisions such as Windows to its cloud computing division. It was also reported that one of Hood's main responsibilities was to create positive organizational culture at Microsoft and is known for regularly speaking to new Microsoft employees.

In 2019, Hood's compensation reached nearly $20.3 million, with $19.1 million as stock awards and incentives. She was the company's second-highest-paid executive for the year. By 2025, her annual compensation was reportedly $25.79 million.

== Accolades ==
Hood was ranked 63rd in the Forbes's list of World's 100 Most Powerful Women in 2023, 28th in 2021, and 23rd in 2023. She was ranked 17th on Fortune's list of Most Powerful Women in 2023 and 17th in 2025. In the same year, Hood was also cited as part of Barrons's annual list of 100 Most Influential Women in US Finance.

== Personal life ==
Hood is married to Max Kleinman, a former partner at Accenture. Hood and her husband are also minority owners of Major League Soccer's Seattle Sounders FC.
