= Seattle Sounders FC =

American professional soccer club based in Seattle

- Nicknames: The Sounders; The Rave Green
- Founded: November 13, 2007 (Note: The Major League Soccer (MLS) club was formed in 2007 and began play in 2009. Previous incarnations of the club competed from 1974 to 1983 in the North American Soccer League and from 1994 to 2008 in various second division leagues.)
- Stadium: Lumen Field; Seattle, Washington
- Capacity: 37,722 (Note: Expandable to 68,740.)
- Owner: Adrian Hanauer
- General manager: Craig Waibel
- Head coach: Brian Schmetzer
- League: Major League Soccer
- 2026: Western Conference: 8th Overall: 16th Playoffs: Wild card round
- Website: soundersfc.com
Home colors	Away colors	Third colors

Seattle Sounders FC is an American professional soccer club based in Seattle. The Sounders compete in Major League Soccer (MLS) as a member of the Western Conference. The club was established on November 13, 2007, and began play in 2009 as an MLS expansion team. The Sounders are a phoenix club, replacing the second-division franchise that played in the American Professional Soccer League (APSL), A-League, and USL First Division (USL-1) from 1994 to 2008, and carrying the same name as the original Sounders franchise that competed in the North American Soccer League (NASL) from 1974 to 1983.

The club's majority owner is Adrian Hanauer, and its minority owners are the estate of Paul Allen, Drew Carey, and 14 families from the Seattle area. Former USL-1 Sounders coach and assistant coach Brian Schmetzer took over as head coach in July 2016 after the departure of Sigi Schmid. The Sounders play their home league matches at Lumen Field, with a reduced capacity of 37,722 seats for most matches. Along with several organized groups, a 53-member marching band called "Sound Wave" supports the club at each home match. Seattle has longstanding rivalries with fellow Pacific Northwest clubs Portland Timbers and Vancouver Whitecaps FC, with whom it competes for the Cascadia Cup.

The Sounders played their inaugural match on March 19, 2009, winning 3–0 over the New York Red Bulls. Seattle has been among the league's most successful teams, winning the U.S. Open Cup four times, the Supporters' Shield in 2014, and the MLS Cup in 2016 and 2019. From its MLS inception until 2022, the team qualified for the MLS Cup playoffs—formerly the longest record in league history—and competed in the CONCACAF Champions League seven times, becoming the first MLS team to win the modern version of the competition in 2022. The Sounders were the first MLS team to participate in the FIFA Club World Cup.

The team set a new MLS record for average attendance in each of its first five seasons. The Sounders are ranked as one of the most valuable franchises in North America. Its former players have included U.S. international Clint Dempsey, long-time captain Osvaldo Alonso, and all-time assist leader Nicolás Lodeiro. The team's top goalscorer is Jordan Morris, who joined the Sounders in 2016 and surpassed Raúl Ruidíaz's record in 2025. Since 2024, the Sounders are affiliated with sister team Seattle Reign FC of the National Women's Soccer League. The Sounders also operate a players' academy and the lower-division Tacoma Defiance, which have produced homegrown players, including forward Jordan Morris and defender DeAndre Yedlin.

== History ==
Even before the first cities in the United States were chosen to host Major League Soccer teams, Seattle was considered a viable location for a professional team. In 1994, as the U.S. was preparing to host the FIFA World Cup, more than 30 cities were pursuing the rights to an MLS team, Seattle being among them. However, despite the strong soccer fan base in Seattle, the absence of a soccer-only stadium was a drawback to establishing an MLS team. Cities seeking consideration for an inaugural MLS team were also expected to secure 10,000 assurances from fans for season tickets. By the June 3, 1994, deadline for MLS team bids, Seattle's soccer organizers had secured fewer than 1,500 such assurances. These low numbers were a result of competition between the ticket campaign for the MLS expansion team and for the American Professional Soccer League (APSL) Sounders expansion team.

In a June 14, 1994, announcement, Seattle was not included among the first seven cities to be awarded an MLS team. Five more teams were to be announced later in the year, and to improve their chances this time, the city's soccer organizers began working with the University of Washington to secure use of Husky Stadium as an interim stadium while they pursued the construction of a permanent soccer-specific facility. In November 1994, the start of the first MLS season was postponed until 1996, and it was noted that the absence of an "adequate grass-field facility" in the area and the presence of the new APSL Seattle Sounders team had thwarted Seattle's MLS bid. In the end, Seattle was not among the cities chosen to establish a team during the first season of MLS.

In 1996, as Seattle Seahawks owner Paul Allen worked with the city to build a new football stadium for his team, the potential of an MLS expansion team that could be a co-tenant helped drive public support for the effort. Many of the state's voters supported the referendum to construct Seahawks Stadium because it was also expected to be a professional soccer venue. While the stadium problem was being resolved, a new issue emerged. By 2000, MLS was moving away from league-operated teams to investor-operated teams, so wealthy individuals would need to step forward for Seattle to obtain an MLS expansion team.

In 2003, Seattle was again listed as a possibility for an MLS expansion team when the ten-team league announced plans to expand into new markets. In 2004, MLS commissioner Don Garber indicated that Seattle had been "very close" to receiving the expansion team ultimately awarded to Salt Lake. Adrian Hanauer, then-owner of the United Soccer League's (USL) Sounders (formerly the APSL Sounders), was in discussions with MLS about an estimated payment of $1 million to secure rights to a Seattle franchise for 2006. However, when Seattle was passed over again in 2006, Hanauer announced that he would not be able to secure an expansion team without the help of more investors willing to cover the increasing MLS franchise fees which had grown beyond $10 million.

=== Expansion and inaugural season ===
In 2007, Hanauer teamed up with Hollywood producer Joe Roth to make another bid for MLS expansion into Seattle, at a cost of $30 million. Paul Allen, whose First and Goal company operated Qwest Field (now Lumen Field), joined the ownership group that same year, making the bid the most promising yet for Seattle. The group competed with two rival bids for the rights to an MLS team in Seattle that had been launched by California-based investors. In a press conference at the Columbia Center on November 13, 2007, it announced that Seattle had been awarded an MLS expansion team that would be owned by Hanauer, Roth, Allen, and TV personality Drew Carey. The announcement marked the return of top-level soccer to Seattle for the first time since the dissolution of its North American Soccer League (NASL) team in 1983. The announcement also meant that the Seattle Sounders of the USL First Division would play its final season the year before the new MLS franchise was formed.

"Seattle Sounders FC" was announced as the team name on April 7, 2008, along with the team logo, colors and badge design, in a presentation held at the Space Needle. All 22,000 season ticket packages offered by the club for its inaugural season were sold, giving them the most season ticket holders in MLS. Sigi Schmid was introduced as the club's first head coach on December 16, 2008, after leaving the Columbus Crew following their MLS Cup victory.

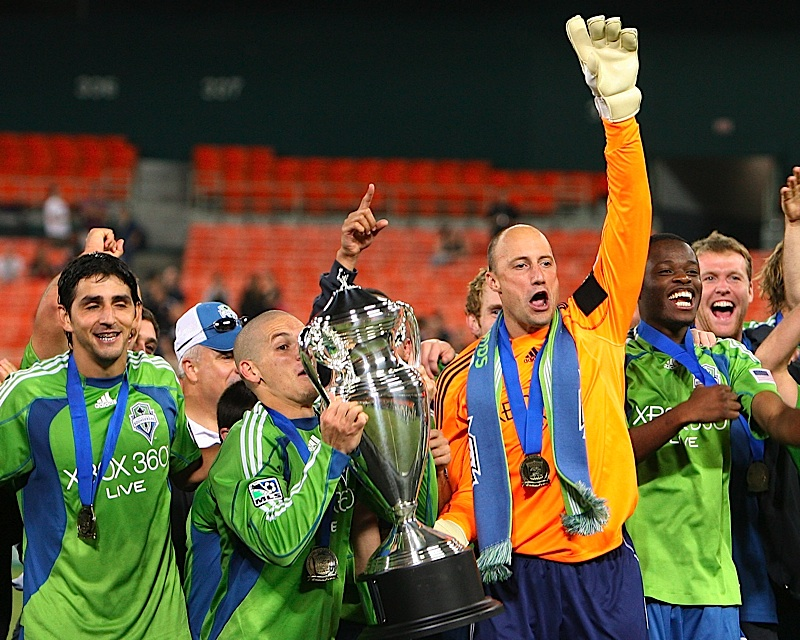
Players celebrate after winning the 2009 U.S. Open Cup.

Seattle Sounders FC entered MLS as the league's 15th team and played its first home match on March 19, 2009, in front of a sold-out crowd of 32,523, defeating the New York Red Bulls 3–0. During the pre-match ceremonies, the first Golden Scarf was awarded to MLS Commissioner Don Garber. Seattle was the first MLS expansion team to win its first three matches, and they did so with a shutout in each. The club set a state record for attendance at a soccer match on August 5, 2009, when 66,848 attended a friendly match with FC Barcelona, a record which was later broken when they hosted Manchester United in front of 67,052 fans, and later in the 2019 MLS Cup against Toronto FC with 69,274 in attendance before being once again broken in the 2025 Leagues Cup final against Inter Miami CF with an attendance of 69,314.

On September 2, 2009, the Sounders became the second MLS expansion team in league history (Chicago was the first) to win the U.S. Open Cup tournament in its first season. They did so by defeating D.C. United 2–1 on the road at RFK Stadium. In winning the U.S. Open Cup tournament, they qualified for the preliminary round of the 2010–11 CONCACAF Champions League.

On October 17, 2009, the Sounders became the third MLS expansion team in league history to qualify for the playoffs in its first season. They clinched a playoff berth with a come-from-behind victory over the Kansas City Wizards 3–2 at Kansas City. Seattle finished the regular season with a record of 12 wins, 7 losses, and 11 draws. The club set a new MLS record for average attendance with 30,943 fans per match. Its inaugural season came to an end in the 2009 MLS Cup Playoffs with a loss in the conference semifinals to the Houston Dynamo by a 1–0 aggregate score in a two-legged series. During the 2009 season, all 15 Sounders MLS regular season home matches, its home playoff match, and its four home U.S. Open Cup matches (played at the Starfire Sports Complex) were sold out.

=== Early years (2010–2013) ===
Before the first match of the Sounders' second season, the club increased the number of season ticket holders to 32,000. The first match of the season was played at Qwest Field, with Seattle hosting a new MLS expansion team, the Philadelphia Union. The Sounders won 2–0 on goals from Brad Evans and Fredy Montero. However, Seattle followed the win by losing 8 of its next 14 matches. In the latter half of the regular season, Seattle reversed its fortune. The team won 10 of its last 15 matches, and clinched a playoff berth for the second consecutive year with a 2–1 win on October 10, 2010, at Kansas City. They finished the season with 14 wins, 10 losses, and 6 ties. In the playoffs, the Sounders were eliminated in the conference semifinals by the Los Angeles Galaxy on a 3–1 aggregate score. The club broke its own single-season attendance record, averaging 36,173 fans per match, and again sold out every league match.

The Sounders also competed in two additional competitions during the 2010 season – the CONCACAF Champions League and the U.S. Open Cup. In the Champions League, Seattle progressed through the preliminary round, beating Isidro Metapán 2–1 on aggregate, but was eliminated in the group stage. In the U.S. Open Cup, Seattle won matches at Portland and at home against the Los Angeles Galaxy and Chivas USA before reaching the final, which they hosted at Qwest Field against the Columbus Crew. On October 5, 2010, Seattle won the U.S. Open Cup final, 2–1, becoming the first team since 1983 to repeat as U.S. Open Cup champions. The final was played in front of a U.S. Open Cup record crowd of 31,311, and the victory ensured Seattle's return to the Champions League in 2011.

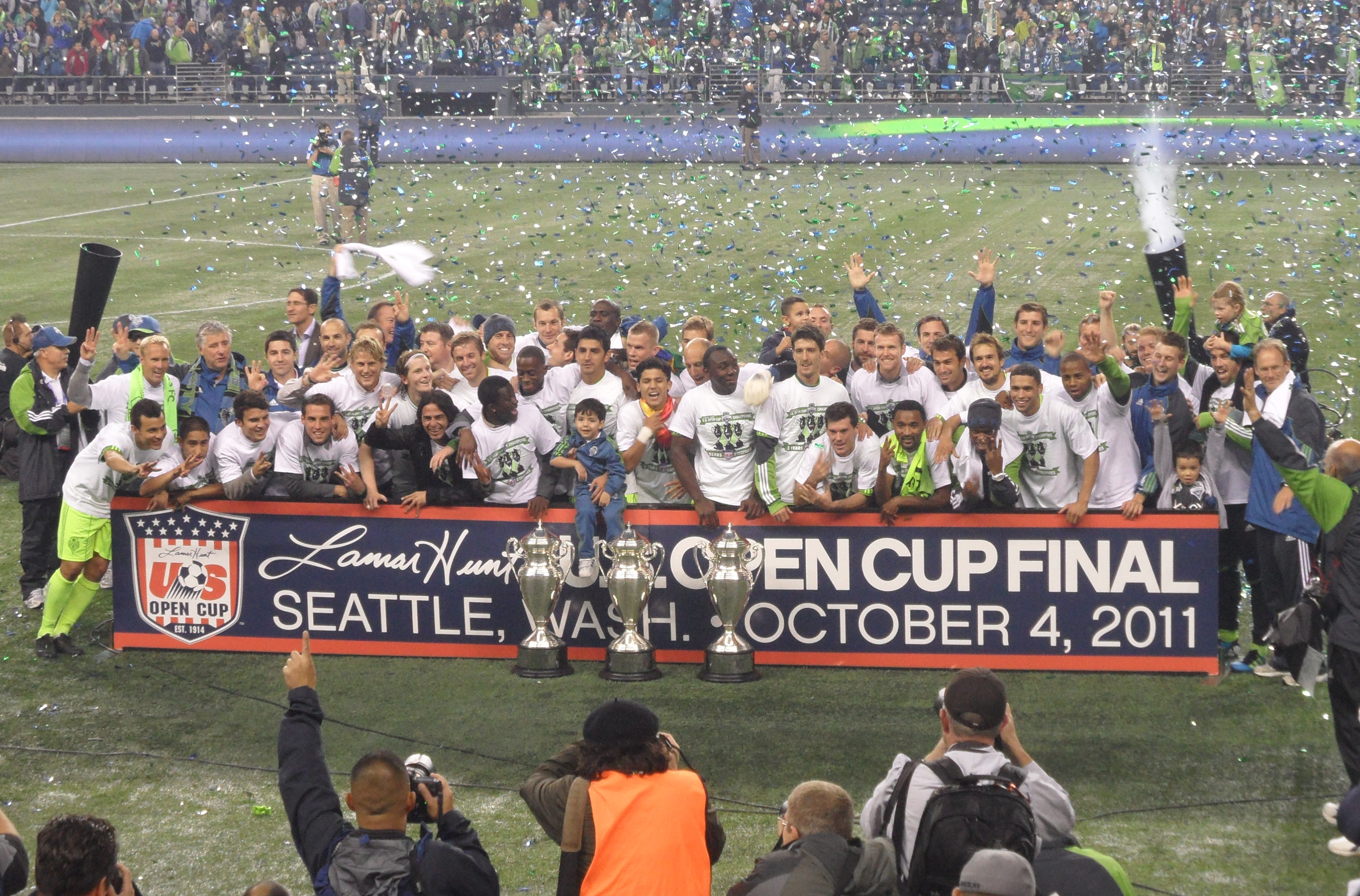
Sounders FC players with the 2009, 2010, and 2011 U.S. Open Cup trophies

The Sounders began the 2011 season by hosting the opening match of the MLS season for the third straight year, losing 1–0 to the Los Angeles Galaxy. The season also saw the entrance of the Portland Timbers and Vancouver Whitecaps FC into MLS, allowing for the revival of the Cascadia Cup; the Sounders won the cup with an unbeaten record against both clubs. On April 22, 2011, in a match against the Colorado Rapids, Seattle's star midfielder Steve Zakuani suffered a broken leg in a challenge by the Rapids' Brian Mullan, which ended his season. Despite setbacks and a slow start to the season (the club won just 3 of its first 10 matches), the Sounders went on to finish the season with the second-best record in the league at 18 wins, 9 draws, 7 losses, and qualified for the playoffs for a third consecutive year. On October 4, 2011, Seattle won its third consecutive U.S. Open Cup, becoming the first club to do so in 42 years, as they defeated the Chicago Fire 2–0 in front of another tournament record crowd of 35,615 at CenturyLink Field. In the MLS playoffs, Seattle lost its Western Conference semifinal series 3–2 on aggregate to Real Salt Lake. The club lost the first leg 3–0 in Salt Lake, and could only net two goals in the second leg at home.

Sounders midfielder Mauro Rosales was recognized by the league as the 2011 Newcomer of the Year. In 2011, Seattle again broke its own league record for average attendance at 38,496. On October 15, 2011, the club hosted the third-largest crowd ever for a single MLS match, as 64,140 people attended the final regular season home match against the San Jose Earthquakes, billed as a sendoff for goalkeeper Kasey Keller. In the 2011–12 CONCACAF Champions League, Seattle became only the second MLS team in history to win a competitive match in Mexico, defeating C.F. Monterrey 1–0 on August 23, 2011. The club finished second in its group and advanced to the quarterfinals, losing 7–3 on aggregate to eventual runners-up Santos Laguna after taking a 2–1 lead at home and losing 6–1 in Mexico.

Seattle opened the 2012 season with a run of five straight wins in April and May, but fell into a month-long, nine-match winless streak in June. The winless streak ended in a match on July 7, which saw the return of Steve Zakuani from rehabilitation, against the Colorado Rapids. Seattle reached the U.S. Open Cup Final for the fourth consecutive year, becoming the first team to do so since 1937, but lost to Sporting Kansas City in a penalty shootout after a 1–1 draw. In Champions League group play, the team advanced to the knockout round with four straight wins, each including a goal from Sammy Ochoa. The Sounders finished third in the Western Conference and qualified for the playoffs, where they advanced out of the first round for the first time in the team's history. In the Conference Championship, Seattle fell 3–0 to Los Angeles in the first leg and came within one goal of tying the series on aggregate, winning the second leg 2–1 but losing 4–2 on aggregate after conceding an away goal. The 2012 season ended without a major trophy for the Sounders, for the first time in their MLS history, and the team failed to qualify for the 2013–14 CONCACAF Champions League. The top scorer in league play was 28-year-old striker Eddie Johnson, who scored 14 goals in his first season with the club; he earned Comeback Player of the Year honors for his performance, which came after an unsuccessful stint with multiple European clubs.

During the 2013 preseason, the Sounders signed their first homegrown player, right back DeAndre Yedlin, veteran defender Djimi Traoré, and forward Obafemi Martins, who paid his release clause to his Spanish club. Longtime forward Fredy Montero left Seattle on loan to Colombian club Millonarios F.C. in January and, by July, was loaned to Sporting CP in Portugal with an option to buy; Montero was sold permanently to Sporting in 2014. The Sounders began the 2013 season with the knockout round of the 2012–13 Champions League, facing Mexican club Tigres UANL in the quarterfinals. After losing 1–0 in the away leg and conceding an away goal in the return leg, the Sounders scored three unanswered goals in the second half to win 3–1 and advance to the semifinals. With the win, the Sounders became the first MLS team to eliminate a Mexican team in the knockout stage of CONCACAF Champions League. Seattle once again played Santos Laguna in the semifinal, but failed to advance after losing 1–0 at home and drawing 1–1 in Torreón. The Sounders continued their five-year streak of setting a new MLS average attendance record, reaching 44,038 in 2013.

The Sounders began the MLS season with a run of five matches without a win, the worst start in the team's history, due to injuries to key players. The Sounders failed to advance in the U.S. Open Cup after losing to second-division Tampa Bay Rowdies in the third round, marking the end of the team's seven-year streak of appearances in the later rounds. As players returned to the team, Seattle improved to a six-win, four-loss record in 14 matches by late June. In August 2013, the Sounders completed the signing of U.S. national team captain Clint Dempsey from Tottenham Hotspur for $9 million, the largest transfer deal in the league's history, and a record salary of $32 million over four years. The team's continued run of wins put them into Supporters' Shield contention in September, coming within one point of the league-leading Red Bulls, but fell to fourth place in the conference after a run of four straight losses in October. The Sounders beat the Colorado Rapids 2–0 in the knockout round, and drew rivals Portland in the conference semifinal. Seattle fell 2–1 to the Timbers in the home leg and were defeated 3–2 in Portland, knocking the Sounders out in a performance that failed to live up to expectations.

The Sounders continued to break the MLS average attendance record for the fourth and fifth consecutive year in 2012 and 2013, with an average of 43,144 and 44,038, respectively. The higher attendances were helped by the opening of additional sections in the Hawks' Nest, as well as the opening of the upper deck of CenturyLink Field for select regular matches. The August 25, 2013, home match against the Portland Timbers drew a crowd of 67,385, the second-largest standalone attendance in league history.

=== Dempsey/Martins years and first Supporters' Shield (2014–2015) ===
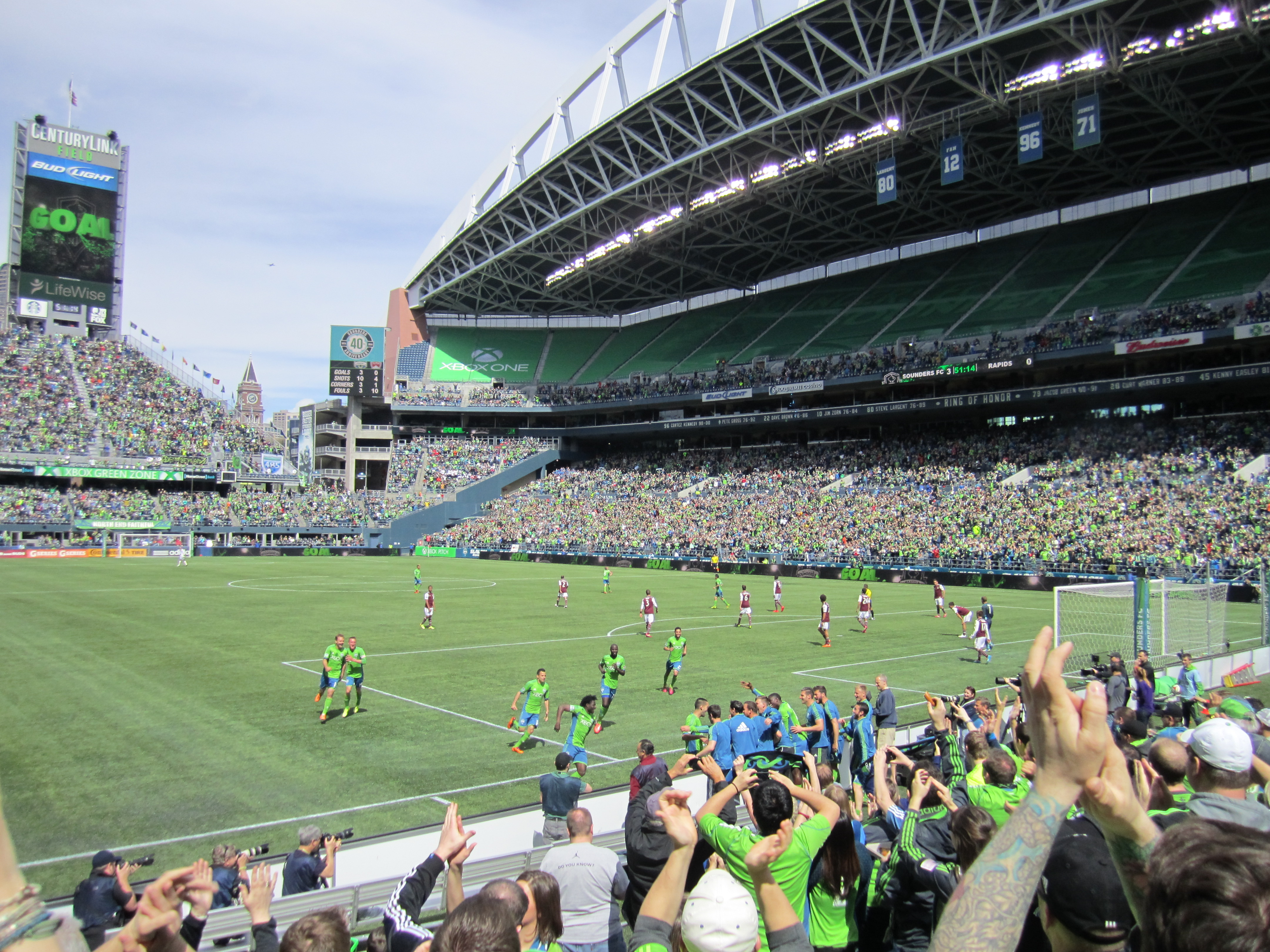
Sounders players celebrating a goal against the Colorado Rapids, 2014

After a disappointing 2013 season, the Sounders replaced starting goalkeeper Michael Gspurning with Toronto's Stefan Frei. Several veteran players, including Eddie Johnson, Patrick Ianni, Jhon Kennedy Hurtado, Mauro Rosales, and Steve Zakuani, left the club as part of a major restructure; Brad Evans was named as club captain. Marco Pappa, an experienced MLS player and Guatemalan international, was added to the team. Homegrown player DeAndre Yedlin was transferred to Tottenham Hotspur but was loaned back to Seattle until the end of the MLS season.

The Sounders advanced to the 2014 Lamar Hunt U.S. Open Cup Final and defeated the Philadelphia Union in extra time, to win their fourth trophy of the tournament. On October 25, 2014, the final game of the 2014 regular season, the Sounders defeated the LA Galaxy 2–0 to secure and win their first Supporters' Shield.

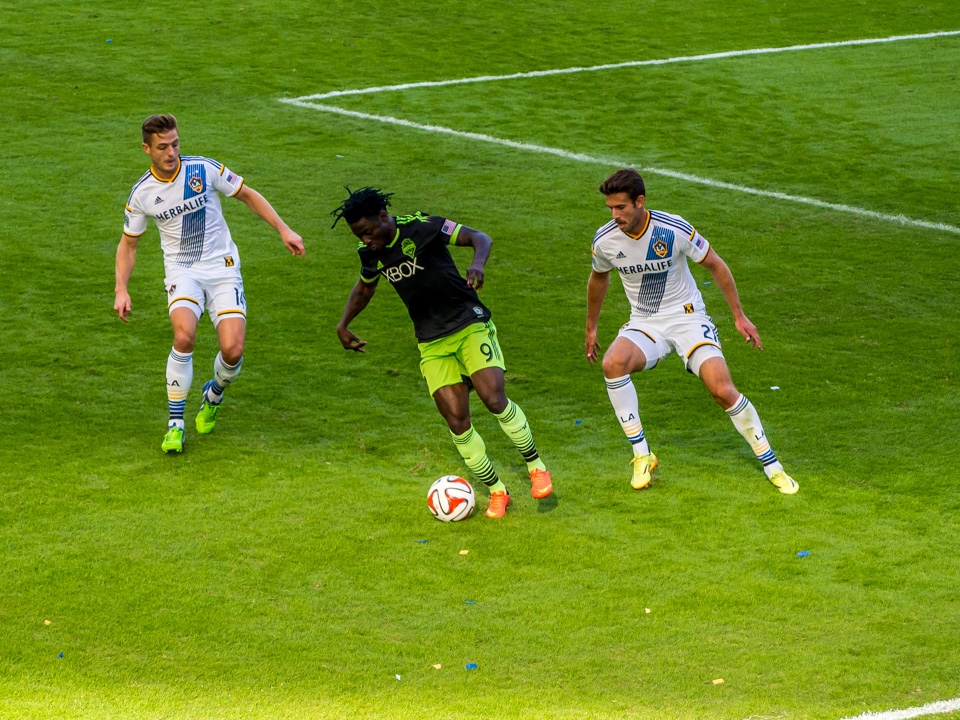
Obafemi Martins dribbling between two L.A. Galaxy defenders, 2014

Entering the playoffs as the top seed, Seattle defeated FC Dallas on the away goals rule and advanced to the Western Conference Championship to face the LA Galaxy once again. The Sounders tied the Galaxy on aggregate score but lost on the away goals rule after losing 1–0 away and winning 2–1 at home. LA would go on to win the MLS Cup.

Former Real Salt Lake general manager Garth Lagerwey was hired by the club in January 2015, replacing Adrian Hanauer. Seattle was unable to repeat their successes in the 2014 season. The season started with several key wins that saw the team at the top of the Western Conference by June. During a 2015 Lamar Hunt U.S. Open Cup match against the Portland Timbers on June 16, however, Obafemi Martins left the game with a groin injury and Clint Dempsey was suspended after tearing a referee's pocketbook, though he would be called away for the 2015 CONCACAF Gold Cup.

The injury and suspension of the team's main attacking duo led to poor performances over the summer, with Seattle winning only one match in nine games. By late August, Martins had recovered and led the team to an eight-match unbeaten streak to secure a playoff spot, finishing fourth in the Western Conference. The Sounders had also successfully topped their group in the 2015–16 CONCACAF Champions League, beating the Vancouver Whitecaps and Club Deportivo Olimpia, with two wins, one draw, and one loss. Paraguayan international Nelson Haedo Valdez was signed as the club's newest Designated Player, and was joined by fellow international signings Andreas Ivanschitz and Román Torres in August 2015; Erik Friberg also returned to the club after his stint in Europe.

During the playoff's opening knockout round, the Sounders defeated the LA Galaxy 3–2, ending a "curse" for the club, who had lost to LA in each of the three previous playoff matchups. The playoff run would end in the next round, the Western Conference semifinals against FC Dallas, during a penalty shootout after both teams were tied on aggregate score after extra time in Frisco, Texas. In November 2015, Adrian Hanauer was made majority owner of the club, succeeding Joe Roth. The club set a new attendance record during the 2015 season, with an average attendance of 44,247.

=== Schmetzer era and first MLS Cup (2016–2018) ===
Prior to the 2016 season, Obafemi Martins abruptly left the club to sign with Shanghai Greenland Shenhua F.C. in the Chinese Super League, a move that would hamper the Sounders' offense during the season. The move was mitigated somewhat by the signing of homegrown product Jordan Morris. Lagerwey also traded Marco Pappa and Lamar Neagle to other clubs in the offseason.

During the first half of the 2016 season, the Sounders failed to meet expectations, placing near the bottom of the league with 6 wins, 12 losses, and 2 draws. Following a 3–0 loss on July 24 to Sporting Kansas City, in which the Sounders had only one shot, Schmid left the club on mutual terms and was replaced by long-time assistant coach Brian Schmetzer. The same day, the club announced their signing of Uruguayan midfielder Nicolás Lodeiro on a designated player contract, as well as the return of former designated player Álvaro Fernández. Despite the sluggish start as well as the loss of midfielder Clint Dempsey, who was forced in August to stop playing after evaluations for an irregular heartbeat, the Sounders rose from ninth place to fourth place in the Western Conference and qualified for the 2016 MLS Cup Playoffs, with eight wins, two losses, and four draws. Schmetzer was named as permanent head coach as a result.

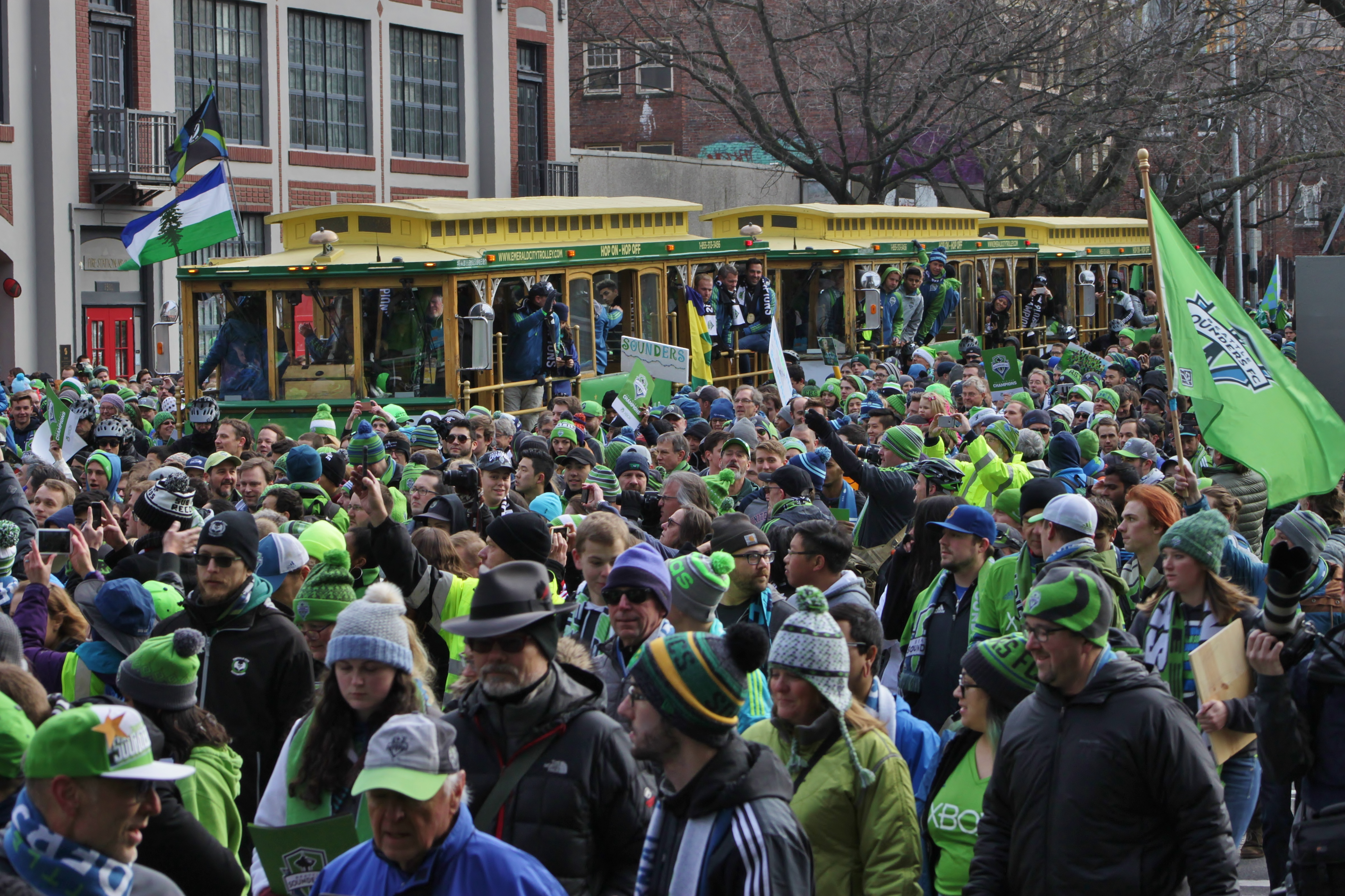
The victory parade for the Sounders after MLS Cup 2016

At the end of the regular season, Jordan Morris was named the MLS Rookie of the Year after scoring the most goals of any American rookie in MLS (12), and Nicolás Lodeiro was named MLS Newcomer of the Year for his 4 goals and 8 assists in 13 appearances. The Sounders advanced from the Knockout Round of the playoffs through a 1–0 win over Sporting Kansas City, and beat FC Dallas 4–2 on aggregate to return to the Conference Final. The Sounders then defeated the Colorado Rapids 3–1 on aggregate in the final, clinching a spot in their first-ever MLS Cup. On December 10, 2016, the Sounders defeated Toronto FC 5–4 in a penalty shootout, to win MLS Cup 2016, their first MLS championship in franchise history, going the whole match without a shot on goal. The team's performance was called a "cinderella season" and hailed as one of the most dramatic MLS seasons to date.

The Sounders began their title defense with the signings of two academy graduates and several veteran players from MLS and abroad. Dempsey also returned from his hiatus and scored in his first match before being called up to the U.S. national team for World Cup qualification. The season began with only five wins in the first 17 matches, but was followed by a 13-match unbeaten streak and additional wins to clinch a second-place spot in the Western Conference. In the playoffs, the Sounders beat the Vancouver Whitecaps and Houston Dynamo to win the Western Conference and return to the MLS Cup, once again facing Toronto at BMO Field. Seattle lost 2–0 to Toronto, who clinched the first domestic treble in MLS history.

Seattle began the 2018 season with a run to the quarterfinals of the CONCACAF Champions League, where they lost 3–1 on aggregate to eventual champions C.D. Guadalajara. During the Round of 16, Jordan Morris injured his ACL and was deemed unfit to play for the rest of the season. Without Morris and several injured starting players, the Sounders lost nine of their first 15 matches and were placed bottom of the Western Conference by June. The club signed a new Designated Player, Peruvian forward Raúl Ruidíaz, that month and began a long unbeaten streak that resulted in a playoff position in late August.

On September 1, the club broke the MLS record for most consecutive wins in the post-shootout era, having won eight consecutive matches. They then extended that win streak to nine games as they beat Vancouver 2–1 on September 15, before eventually losing to the Philadelphia Union on September 19. The Sounders finished second in the Western Conference with 18 wins, 11 losses, and 5 draws. With 14 wins in the final 16 matches of the season, the Sounders completed the best half season in league history. Minority owner Paul Allen died from complications related to non-Hodgkin lymphoma on October 15, 2018, leaving his stake in the Sounders to an estate executed by his sister Jody Allen. Seattle then faced the Portland Timbers in the Conference Semifinals, losing the away leg 2–1 and winning the home leg 3–2 to tie the series on aggregate after extra time. In the ensuing penalty shootout, Portland won 4–2; the home leg is considered to be one of the best playoff matches in league history due to its dramatic finish.

=== Second MLS Cup title and pandemic (2019–2021) ===
The 2019 season began with the loss of team captain and inaugural season player Osvaldo Alonso, who was released into free agency and signed with Minnesota United FC before the season began. Defender Chad Marshall, who had joined in 2014, announced his retirement from professional soccer on May 22, leaving unexpectedly mid-way through the season. Despite the loss of these two players, in addition to the suspension of Román Torres for ten matches for testing positive for a performance-enhancing substance in August, the Sounders finished 2nd in the Western Conference and 4th in the overall league table. They qualified for a berth in the 2020 CONCACAF Champions League and earned a record 11th appearance in the MLS Cup Playoffs, which would use single-elimination matches for the first time in league history.

The Sounders defeated FC Dallas 4–3 in the first round with a hat-trick from Jordan Morris, who had been named MLS Comeback Player of the Year following his return from an ACL tear. The team then won against Real Salt Lake at home and traveled away to play in the Conference Finals against Supporters' Shield winners Los Angeles FC, where they won 3–1. Seattle hosted the MLS Cup final against Toronto FC, playing them for the third time in four years, and won 3–1 to clinch their second championship. The match drew an attendance of 69,274, setting records for the team and any sporting event at CenturyLink Field.

Seattle opened the 2020 season with the CONCACAF Champions League, where they lost in the round of 16 to C.D. Olimpia in a penalty shootout after a 4–4 aggregate draw. The Sounders played two regular season matches at home before MLS suspended all activities on March 12, 2020, due to the worsening COVID-19 pandemic, which had been affecting the Seattle area for several weeks. The league returned in the MLS is Back Tournament, played in the Orlando area, and the Sounders earned a 1–1–1 record in group play. They advanced to the round of 16, where they lost 4–1 to Los Angeles FC. The team then resumed hosting matches with no spectators at CenturyLink Field (renamed Lumen Field near the end of the season) and primarily played against West Coast teams due to limited travel.

The Sounders cancelled an away match against the LA Galaxy in August to join a multi-sport boycott to protest racial injustice. They later set a franchise record for largest margin of victory with a 7–1 home win against the San Jose Earthquakes on September 10. The team clinched their 12th consecutive playoff berth and finished second in the Western Conference. In the playoffs, the Sounders defeated Los Angeles FC and FC Dallas to host Minnesota United FC in the Western Conference Final. Minnesota took a 2–0 lead in the second half, but Seattle responded with three goals in the final 18 minutes to complete a comeback victory and secure a fourth MLS Cup appearance in five years. The Sounders faced the Columbus Crew in the 2020 MLS Cup final and lost 3–0 in front of 1,500 spectators at Mapfre Stadium on December 12—the latest calendar date to host a league match.

Seattle opened the 2021 season with a 13-match unbeaten streak, setting a new MLS record in the process, despite missing Nicolas Lodeiro, Jordan Morris, Stefan Frei, and Raul Ruidiaz to long-term injuries. Manager Brian Schmetzer switched to a 3–5–2 formation that led to only eight conceded goals during the streak. The Sounders retained the Cascadia Cup with a 2–1–1 record, including a 6–2 away victory over the Portland Timbers. The team also won twice against Mexican clubs UANL and Santos Laguna in the 2021 Leagues Cup and advanced to the final, where they lost 3–2 to Club León in Las Vegas. Seattle maintained their first-place position in the Western Conference despite several losses in the summer, but fell into a winless streak over the final six matches of the season to finish second in the West. They qualified for the playoffs but were eliminated in the first round by Real Salt Lake in a penalty shootout.

=== Champions League title and first Club World Cup (2022–2024) ===
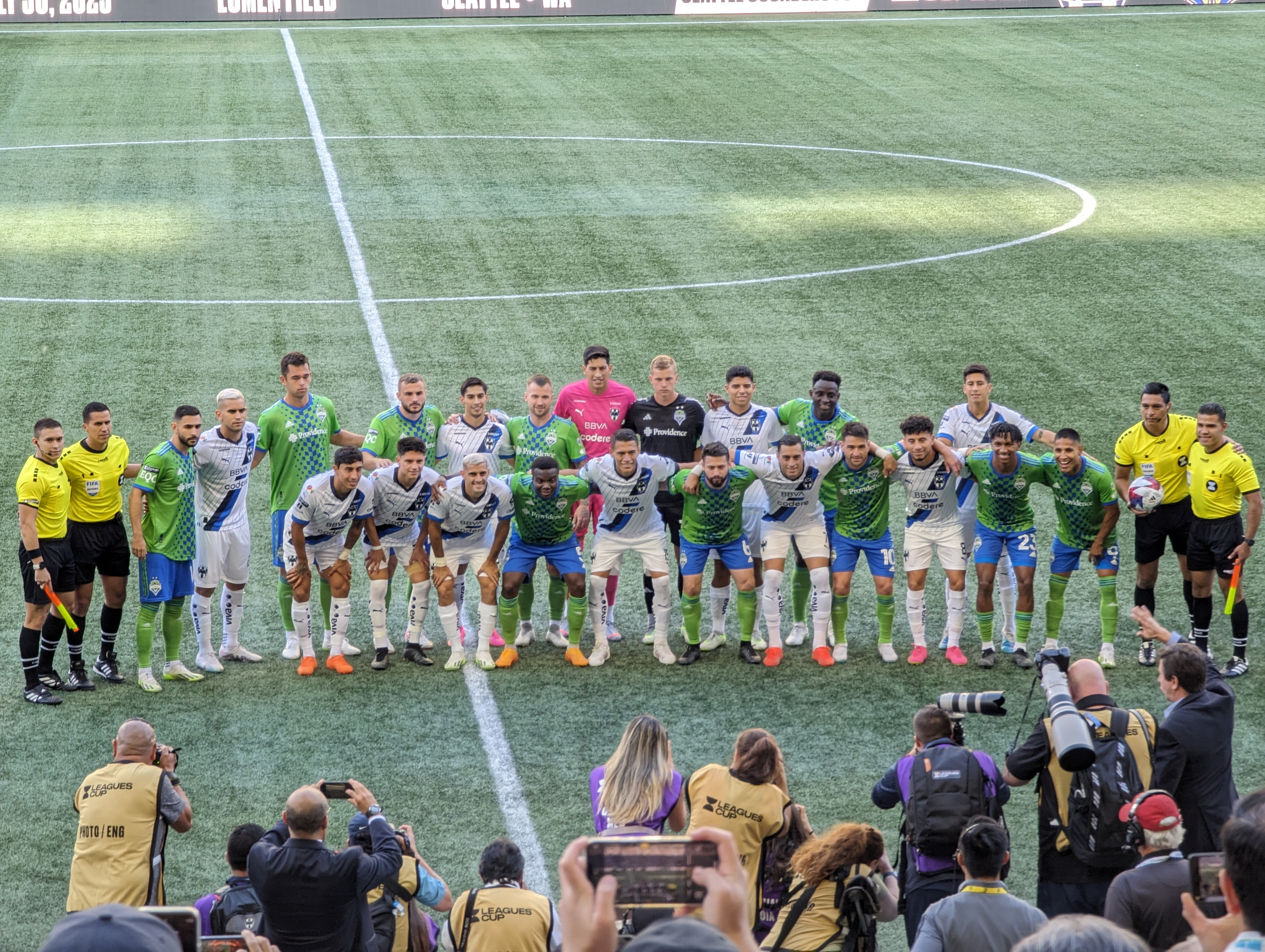
The starting lineups for the Sounders and C.F. Monterrey during their 2023 Leagues Cup match

The team qualified for the 2022 CONCACAF Champions League as the best-performing MLS club without their own berth, replacing the slot reserved for the cancelled U.S. Open Cup. In the round of 16, the Sounders were held to a scoreless draw to F.C. Motagua in Honduras but defeated them 5–0 in the second leg at home. Seattle then faced Club León in a rematch of the Leagues Cup Final, winning 3–0 at home in the first leg and drawing 1–1 in the second leg to advance to the semifinals. The team played MLS Cup 2021 champions New York City FC in the semifinals, winning 3–1 at home in the first leg and drawing 1–1 in the second leg to advance 4–2 on aggregate. The Sounders advanced to their first Champions League final and faced Mexican club UNAM, who hosted the first leg. The two teams drew 2–2 and returned to Seattle, where the Sounders won 3–0 in front of 68,741, setting a competition attendance record. The Sounders became the first MLS club to win the CONCACAF Champions League with their 5–2 aggregate victory. As CONCACAF champions, Seattle became the first MLS club to participate in the FIFA Club World Cup.

The Sounders entered the U.S. Open Cup in the Round of 32 and drew 2–2 with the San Jose Earthquakes. The ensuing penalty shootout took 11 rounds and was won 10–9 by San Jose. The club resumed league play, where they had fallen to 13th place in the Western Conference, and used rotated lineups to balance a congested schedule; by early July, they had improved to fourth in the West. Further injuries and players missing due to national team call-ups and suspensions caused the team to lose most of their matches over the following two months. With a loss to Sporting Kansas City on the penultimate matchday of the season, the Sounders were eliminated from playoff contention. This marked the first time the club had failed to qualify for the MLS Cup Playoffs and ended a 13-year streak—the longest active streak in MLS and second-longest in major North American sports.

On November 22, 2022, Lagerwey departed the club after a seven-year tenure to assume the role of President and CEO at Atlanta United FC. The Sounders announced their appointment of Craig Waibel as the club's new general manager and Chief Soccer Officer on November 30. He had been hired by the club in 2021 to serve as sporting director. The team began their 2023 preseason in Seattle before a training camp in Marbella, Spain, to prepare for the 2022 FIFA Club World Cup in Morocco. The Sounders entered in the second round against Egypt's Al Ahly, the runners-up in the 2021–22 CAF Champions League, and lost 1–0 to a late goal. The club also qualified for the expanded 2025 edition of the tournament due to their 2022 CONCACAF Champions League title. The team finished second in the Western Conference during the 2023 regular season, behind expansion team St. Louis City SC, and returned to the MLS Cup Playoffs on a nine-match unbeaten streak. They were eliminated in the Conference Semifinals by Los Angeles FC at home, their first playoff loss in Seattle since 2013.

The Sounders debuted a new logo in September 2023 as part of the club's 50th anniversary celebrations the following year. A new training facility and team headquarters, the Sounders FC Center at Longacres in Renton, opened at the start of the 2024 season to replace the Starfire Sports Complex. The club signed Argentinian winger Pedro de la Vega to a four-year Designated Player contract in January 2024. Ruidíaz became the top goalscorer in the team's MLS history on March 23, 2024, surpassing the 79-goal record set by Fredy Montero. Outside of league play, the Sounders were eliminated in the U.S. Open Cup semifinals and Leagues Cup quarterfinals in the same month, both in losses to Los Angeles FC. The team qualified for the playoffs and defeated Los Angeles FC, who were the top seed in the Western Conference, but were eliminated in the Western Conference Final by the LA Galaxy.

=== Second Club World Cup appearance and Leagues Cup title (2025–present) ===
The team made their eighth appearance in the CONCACAF Champions Cup (renamed from the Champions League) to begin the 2025 season. They had qualified based on their performance during the 2024 regular season, as other teams had used different pathways to reach the competition. The Sounders defeated Antigua of Guatemala and advanced to the round of 16, where they were eliminated by Mexican club Cruz Azul. The second leg in Mexico City was marred by a season-ending injury to Paul Arriola, who had joined the Sounders during the offseason alongside former FC Dallas teammate Jesús Ferreira. The 4–1 loss also marked the end of a thirteen-match unbeaten streak in CONCACAF competition, which was a record for an MLS club.

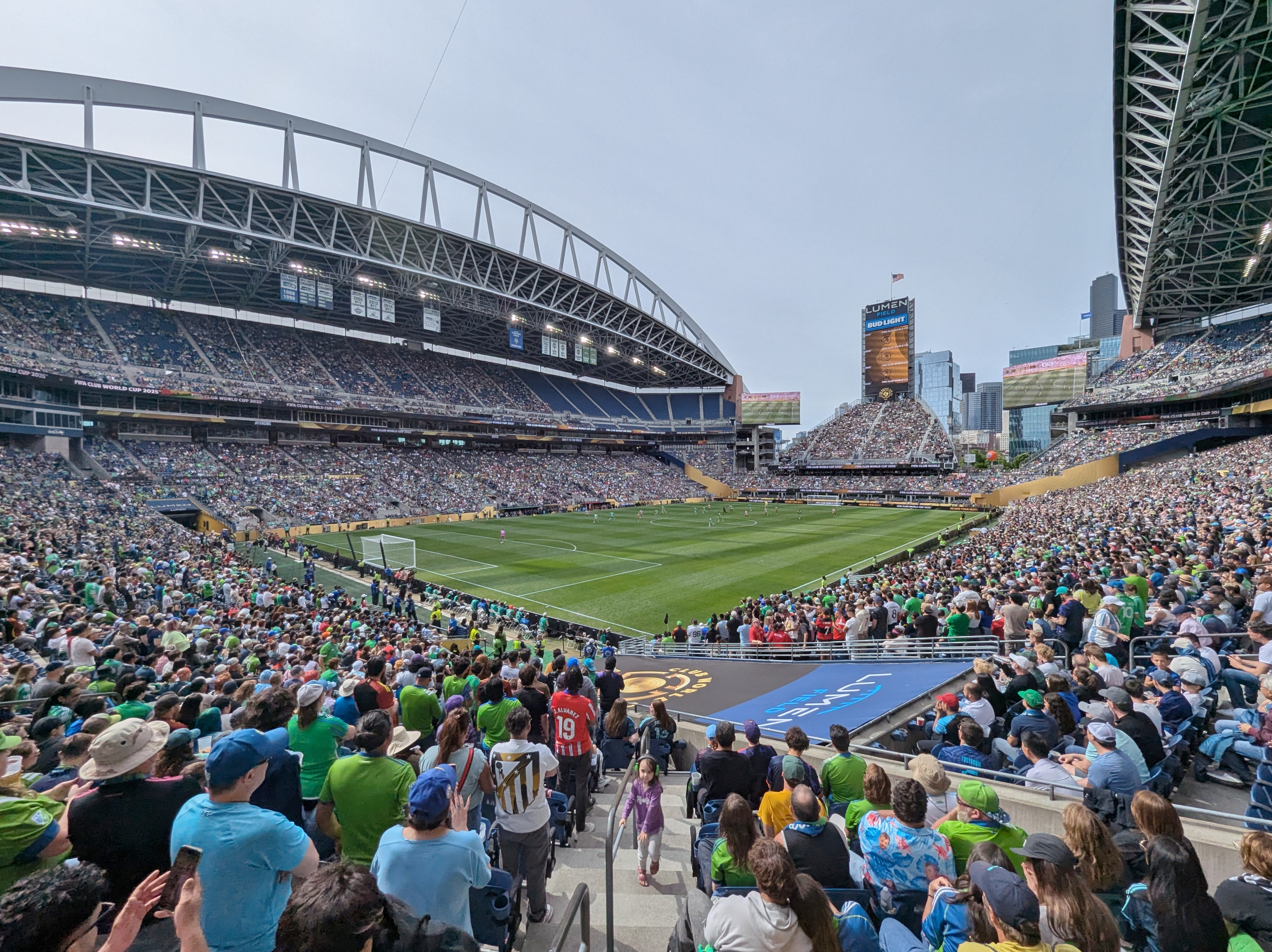
Lumen Field during a 2025 FIFA Club World Cup match between the Sounders and Atlético Madrid

The Sounders hosted its three group stage matches during the 2025 FIFA Club World Cup at Lumen Field, where a temporary grass surface was installed over the turf for the tournament. The team opened the tournament against Botafogo, the reigning Copa Libertadores champion from Brazil, and lost 2–1 after they had attempted a late comeback. Cristian Roldan scored the first goal by an American team in the tournament's history. Spanish side Atlético Madrid then defeated the Sounders 3–1 in front of 51,636 spectators at Lumen Field, with the lone goal from the home team scored by Albert Rusnák. The team were eliminated from the competition in a 0–2 loss to Paris Saint-Germain, the reigning UEFA Champions League winner, and finished at the bottom of their group. The Sounders received praise from their opponents for their performance in the Club World Cup, but were unable to capitalize on scoring chances during the three matches.

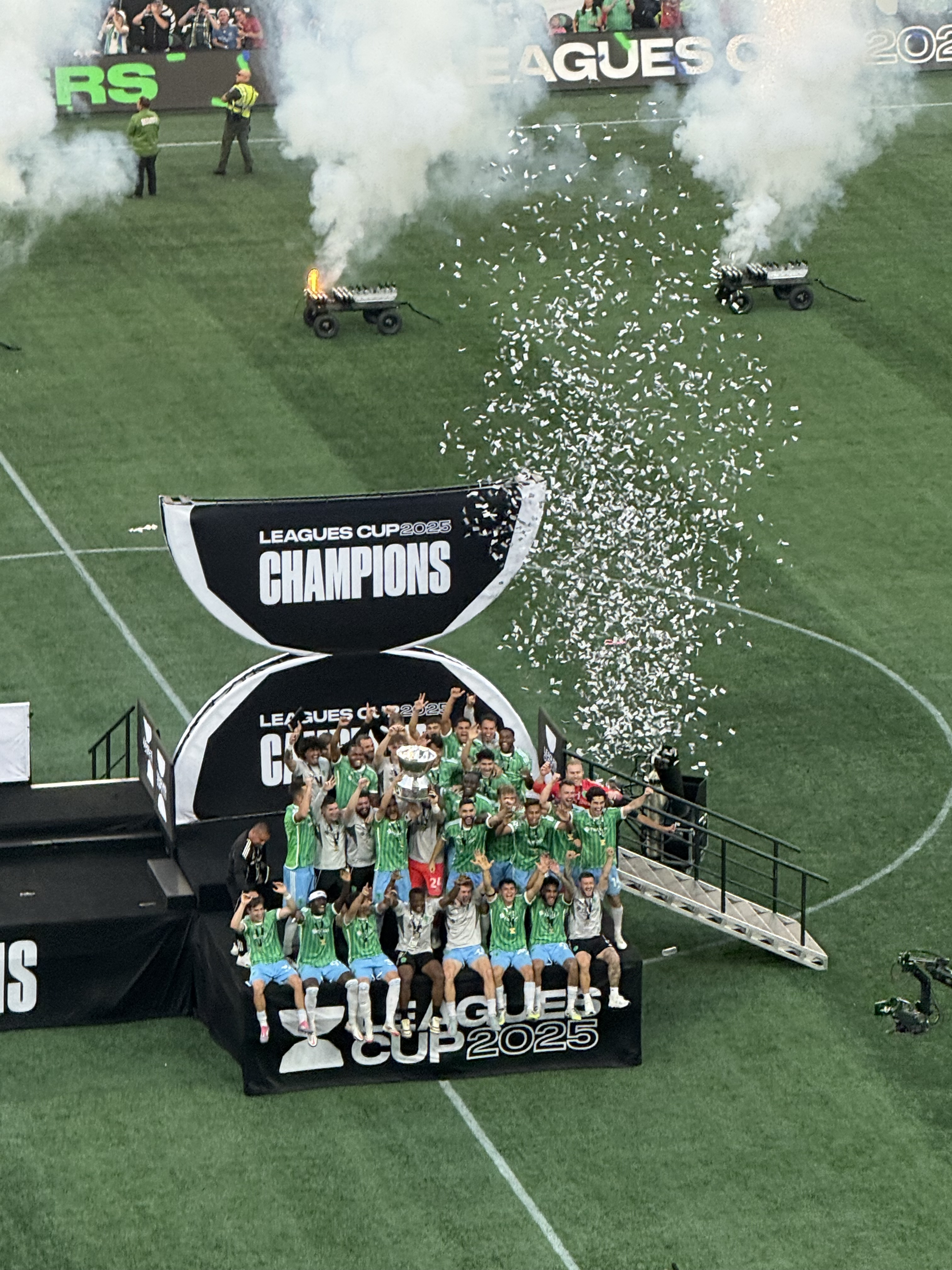
Sounders lifting the 2025 Leagues Cup trophy

The team returned to MLS play and were unbeaten in six league matches. The Sounders opened the 2025 Leagues Cup with a 7–0 win against Cruz Azul, the reigning CONCACAF Champions Cup winners, by scoring seven goals in the second half. The match set a record for the largest margin of victory in the club's modern era as well as for any MLS team against Liga MX opposition. The Sounders would win the Leagues Cup, defeating Lionel Messi and Inter Miami 3–0 in the final at Lumen Field in front of a crowd of 69,314. The three goals in the match were scored by Osaze De Rosario, Alex Roldan, and Paul Rothrock. This title would also be a milestone for the club, as they became the first United States based soccer club to win all continental and domestic trophies available.

== Club colors and crest ==
The former logo of Seattle Sounders FC, used from 2008 to 2023

The original badge design resembles a heraldic shield, and consists of two layers which represent "the partnership between the ownership, the community, the players and the fans". The logo incorporates the Space Needle, an internationally recognized Seattle landmark. The official team colors are Sounder Blue, signifying the waters of Puget Sound; Rave Green, representing the forests of the Pacific Northwest; and Cascade Shale, representing the Cascade Range to the east of Seattle. Fans chose a name for the team in an online poll held between March 27 and 31, 2008. The initial list of possibilities – Seattle FC, Seattle Republic and Seattle Alliance – deliberately did not include Seattle Sounders in order to provide a "fresh" start. Despite the names having been selected through fan research and internal committees, the omission of the traditional Sounders name embittered many in the Seattle community.

In response to the backlash, the team added a fourth write-in option for the team name, allowing for any name to be suggested on the ballot. Of the more than 14,500 votes received in choosing the new team name, 49% of the votes included some form of the name "Sounders". Upon announcing the name of the club, Hanauer acknowledged the significance of keeping with tradition: "The team playing at the highest level in our region has always been called Sounders. Starting with the NASL and then the USL 1st Division, we now have the chance to create a separate and distinct identity with the new MLS team." The NASL team was originally named in a public contest, with "Sounders" announced as the winner on January 22, 1974.

The Sounders have usually played in a rave green primary jersey with varying colors and designs for their secondary and third kits. The club's third kits in early years used bright colors, such as "electricity yellow" and cyan, but were later replaced with more muted colors; they primarily saw use during non-league matches. A throwback kit was introduced as a secondary jersey in 2017 and features the NASL Sounders logo and a design inspired by white jerseys used by the pre-MLS incarnations of the team. The secondary jersey was changed in 2019 to a black-and-pink design inspired by a colorful sunset during a 2014 match against the Portland Timbers. It was followed in 2021 by a dark purple jersey with orange and yellow accents to evoke the style of Seattle musician Jimi Hendrix; the jersey was designed in partnership with his family and features Hendrix's signature. An updated secondary kit inspired by martial artist and actor Bruce Lee—who lived in Seattle and is buried in the city—was released in 2023, the 50th anniversary of his death. The jersey is primarily red with a stylized dragon on the front and includes yellow and black accents as well as the symbols of Jeet Kune Do and Lee's signature.

A new logo and brand design was unveiled on September 26, 2023, ahead of the 2024 season—the club's 50th anniversary. It used colors and elements from previous Sounders logos around a simplified version of the shield, which contained the Space Needle and omitted all text except for 1974, the year of the club's founding. A set of secondary and tertiary logos were also added, including an orca, the "SFC" wordmark, and a carnation—which are traditionally given by Sounders players to fans at the end of the final home match of the season. An updated wordmark for the Sounders incorporates a wave-like element to reference the 1974 logo. The rebrand was developed by the club and design consultants through fan surveys and input from community members. The first home jersey under the rebrand, named the Anniversary Kit, was unveiled ahead of the 2024 season and features aqua pinstripes on a green background; several elements were inspired by jerseys from earlier incarnations of the Sounders. The 2025 secondary jersey, named the "Salish Sea Kit", uses shades of blue that are arranged in triangular Salish weaving patterns designed in collaboration with three artists from Coast Salish tribes. The jersey includes the Southern Lushootseed phrase x̌ax̌aʔ ti qʷuʔ and its English translation ("water is sacred") on the front and a stylized orca tail on the back. A throwback jersey, the "Orca Kit", was introduced in July 2025 as part of a collaboration with Adidas and MLS for certain teams. It is primarily purple with light blue and white waves on the sleeves; the jersey was designed to resemble the kit used by the Sounders in the 1995 A-League season, where they won their first league championship.

=== Sponsorship ===
The team's ownership revealed the first Sounders jersey on May 28, 2008, and announced Microsoft as the team's sponsor in a five-year deal worth approximately $20 million. As part of the agreement, Xbox branding appeared on the front of the Sounders' jerseys and throughout the stadium, beginning with the Xbox 360 and Xbox Live and later replaced with the Xbox One (simply shown as "XBOX"). Despite hiring a consultant to explore other jersey partnerships in 2012, the Microsoft sponsorship was repeatedly extended with a one-year contract in 2013, for the following season, and 2014, lasting through the end of the 2016 season. The second extension came amid rumors that Emirates was interested in a sponsorship as part of their marketing campaign in Seattle. The jersey has been modified several times to include promotions for Xbox games, including Halo 5 and Gears of War 4.

The Sounders contracted talent firm WME-IMG to explore new jersey sponsorship and other advertising opportunities in 2017, shortly before the expiration of the Microsoft contract. On January 17, 2019, the team announced that Seattle-based online retailer Zulily would become the jersey sponsor in a multiyear jersey deal at an undisclosed fee. Zulily also took over sponsorship of the NWSL's Seattle Reign, but naming rights to the pitch at CenturyLink Field was not part of the contract. The club's first sleeve patch sponsor, WaFd Bank, was announced in July 2020 ahead of the MLS is Back Tournament. In 2021, the Sounders announced a multi-year partnership with the Puyallup Tribe of Indians to sponsor the right sleeve on kits, with the Emerald Queen Casino on primary kits and the tribe's emblem on secondary kits.

Providence Health & Services was announced as the club's new jersey sponsor at a Renton event on January 20, 2023. The 10-year sponsorship was brokered by Oak View Group and signed for an undisclosed amount. The choice of Providence as sponsor was criticized by fans and several organizations, including the Emerald City Supporters and the Sounders FC Alliance Council, due to the healthcare system's policies on abortion, transgender care, and treatment of low-income patients. The jersey sponsorship will cease at the end of the 2027 season through the use of an early opt-out clause.

Period	Kit manufacturer	Shirt sponsor	Sleeve sponsor
2009–2018	Adidas	Xbox	—
2019	Adidas	Zulily	—
2020	Adidas	Zulily	WaFd Bank
2021–2022	Adidas	Zulily	Emerald Queen Casino
2023–present	Adidas	Providence	Emerald Queen Casino

== Stadium ==
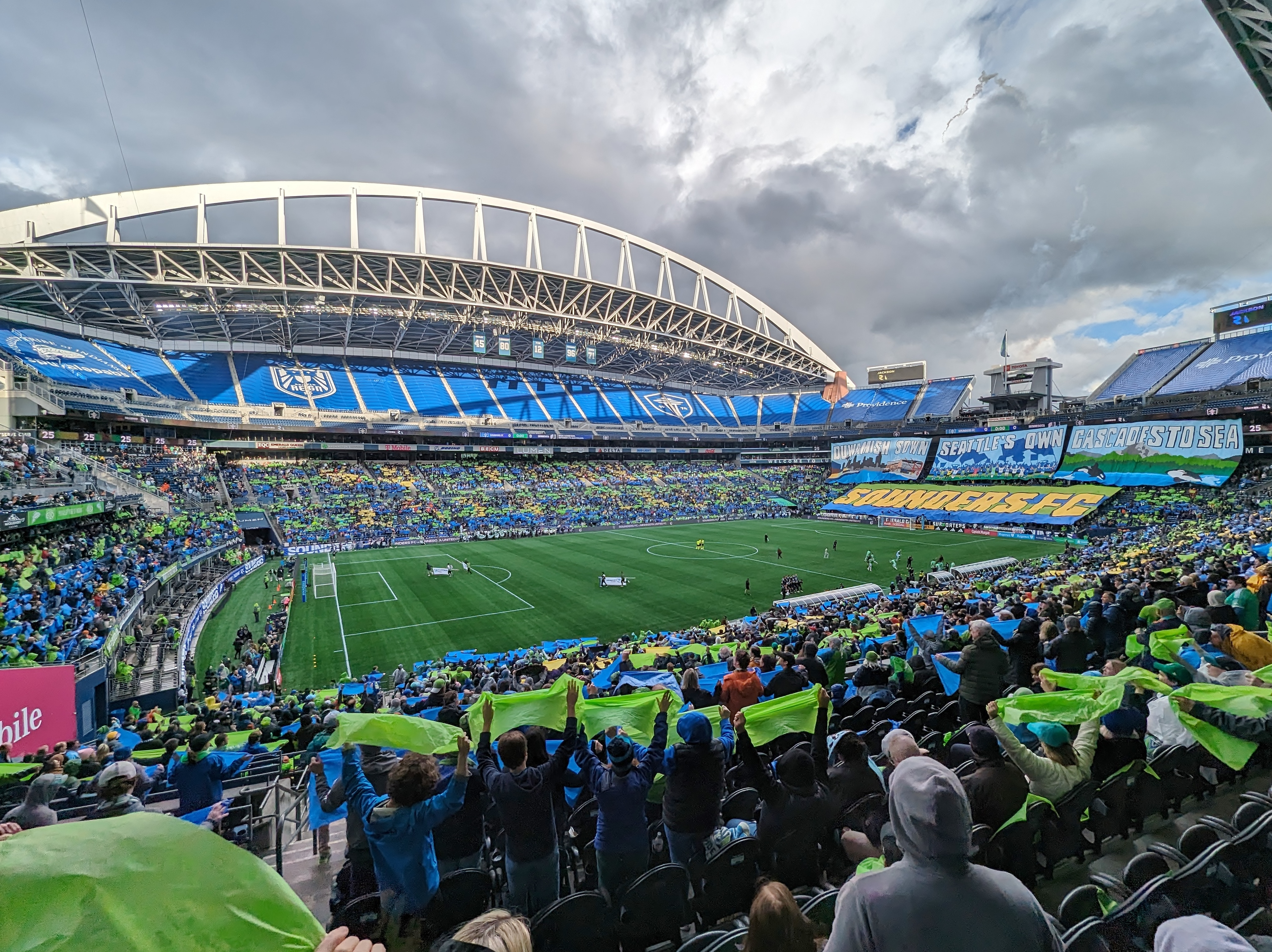
Supporters in the lower bowl of Lumen Field

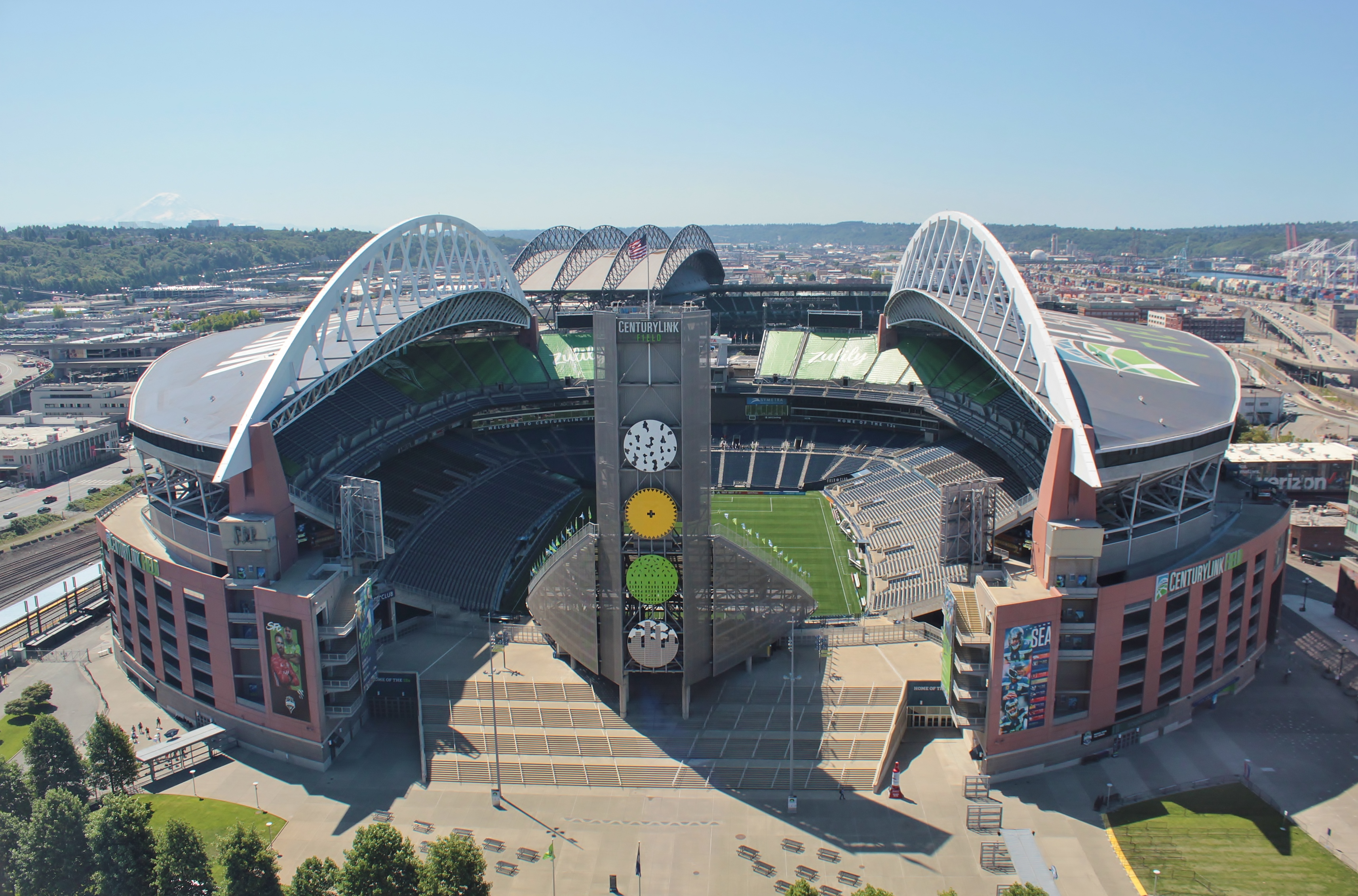
Overhead view of Lumen Field in soccer configuration

Seattle Sounders FC plays home matches at Lumen Field in Seattle, also home to the Seattle Seahawks. Former Sounders minority owner, the late Paul Allen, was also the owner of the Seahawks, who have a 30-year lease on CenturyLink Field. Because of this relationship, the Sounders made use of Lumen Field without paying rent. In 2015, the team announced an extension of their lease with First & Goal Inc. for use of Lumen Field that would remain through the 2028 season. For Sounders matches, the field was called "The Xbox Pitch at CenturyLink Field" as part of the sponsorship deal with Microsoft from 2009 to 2018. The field was renamed in 2022 to the "Emerald Queen Casino Pitch at Lumen Field".

Lumen Field is a 69,000-seat stadium designed for both teams. The Sounders artificially limit the stadium's capacity for MLS matches, with certain seating sections covered with tarpaulins to provide "a more intimate atmosphere". However, the club does open the entire stadium for international friendly matches and some league matches. The team's original business plan expected only 12,000 tickets per game. Based on high initial demand, capacity for the stadium was limited to 24,500 for the beginning of the inaugural 2009 season. However, owing to continued high demand, capacity has been increased multiple times, to 38,500 for the 2012 season and to 39,115 for the 2015 season and 37,722 in 2019.

The Sounders have opened additional sections at Lumen Field for international friendlies, MLS Cup finals, and select regular season matches. The final home match of the 2011 season, coinciding with the retirement of goalkeeper Kasey Keller, drew 64,140 spectators and was the first Sounders regular season match to open the stadium to full capacity. The following season had three full-capacity matches, including a fixture against the Portland Timbers in October with 66,452 spectators, the second-largest stand-alone attendance in MLS history. The record was surpassed during the following year's home match against the Portland Timbers in August with 67,385 in attendance. The Sounders set a new attendance record with MLS Cup 2019, which was played in front of 69,274 at Lumen Field.

The 2020 season was suspended after two matches due to the COVID-19 pandemic, after which the Sounders played home matches behind closed doors. The following season saw capacity gradually increase from 7,000 in March to normal capacity in June, along with required proof of vaccination or a negative COVID-19 test to comply with state guidelines. The largest attendance during the pandemic era came during a doubleheader with OL Reign against their respective Portland opponents in August 2021, which drew 45,737 people for the MLS fixture. The Sounders would set a new attendance record in the 2025 Leagues Cup final against Lionel Messi and Inter Miami with 69,314 in attendance—surpassing all other sporting events in the stadium's history.

While the Sounders currently play on FieldTurf, Lumen Field has previously had temporary natural grass installed for international soccer events. In 2012, an updated FieldTurf surface was installed and certified by FIFA with a 2-star quality rating, the highest possible rating. If an MLS rule change requires natural grass playing surfaces, the field will be permanently replaced with natural grass. A new turf surface, based on the Revolution 360 brand developed by FieldTurf, was installed in early 2016 as part of the extended lease after noticeable wear on the former surface.

From 2008 to 2024, the team's training facilities and offices were located at the Starfire Sports Complex in Tukwila. Starfire remains used to host U.S. Open Cup matches due to its smaller size. Sounders representatives have said they prefer the more intimate atmosphere for smaller cup matches. Another alternate venue in the area is T-Mobile Park (formerly Safeco Field), a baseball stadium adjacent to Lumen Field; it was considered for a potential 2018 CONCACAF Champions League match if the Sounders had advanced to the semifinals due to a scheduling conflict with another event at Lumen Field. A new training facility, named the Providence Swedish Performance Center & Clubhouse, opened in February 2024 at an office park in Renton at the site of the former Longacres horse racetrack. It was announced in 2022 and features 300,000 square feet (28,000 m^{2}) of office space, four training fields, and a public clubhouse. Providence was announced as the naming rights sponsor for the facility in April 2024. The Providence Swedish Performance Center & Clubhouse was the base camp facility for River Plate alongside the Sounders during the 2025 FIFA Club World Cup and the Belgium national team during the 2026 FIFA World Cup.

The Sounders ownership group have proposed the construction of a smaller soccer-specific stadium at Longacres that would be ready after the expiration of the Lumen Field lease in 2032. The team had previously commissioned a study for a soccer-specific stadium at the site of Memorial Stadium on the Seattle Center campus in 2015, among other sites.

== Supporters ==
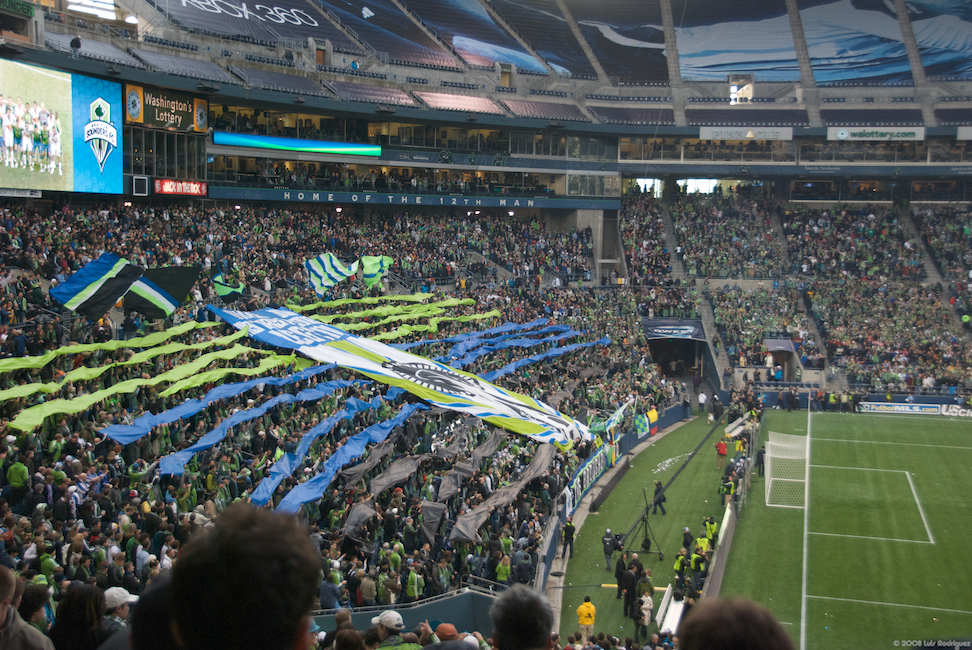
Emerald City Supporters unveil a tifo prior to the club's inaugural match.

The Sounders FC Alliance was established at the request of minority owner Drew Carey, who was named its chairman. Based on the fan association at FC Barcelona, members of the Alliance have the ability to vote on the removal of the general manager and on other team decisions. Season ticket holders become automatic members, while non-season ticket holders may buy into the Alliance for a fee. Membership benefits include voting privileges, an invitation to the annual meeting and other team perks. Members may also be elected to the Sounders FC Alliance Council by receiving at least 25 nominations from other members on an annual basis. The first vote on retaining or replacing Sounders general manager Adrian Hanauer was held in late 2012. After 13,775 votes registered, Hanauer was retained by the Alliance.

Carey also requested that the Sounders have their own marching band, the first of its kind in MLS. This led to the creation of Sound Wave, a 53-member marching band consisting of brass and marching percussion. The band plays music from multiple genres, such as Latin, rock and pop, and sits on the north end of Lumen Field. The March to the Match, in which fans march from Occidental Park to Lumen Field before each home match, has been accompanied by Sound Wave. The club's fight song is "Salute to the Olympians" by Henry Mancini, which had been adopted by the NASL Sounders in 1974 and later used by the USL Sounders.

Besides the Alliance, there are four recognized, independent supporters groups for the Sounders. Emerald City Supporters (ECS), which formed in 2005 to support the USL Sounders, is the largest supporter group and sits in the south end of the stadium (nicknamed the "Brougham End") in sections 121–123. The Eastside Supporters, established in 2010 to recognize fans from the Eastside region, are located in section 150. Gorilla FC, an anti-fascist supporters group that fundraises for charitable causes in the Puget Sound region, is based in section 120. The North End Faithful sit in the north end of the stadium.

== Rivalries ==
The Seattle–Portland and Seattle–Vancouver rivalries formed among the respective NASL teams in the mid-1970s and carried on through to the USL and MLS. In 2004, the fan-based Cascadia Cup was created to formalize the competition between the Seattle, Portland, and Vancouver USL teams. The trophy is exchanged by the three teams' supporters groups and is based on the results of certain regular season matches. The Cascadia Cup was contested without Seattle for two seasons after the Sounders entered MLS in 2009, but Portland and Vancouver were awarded expansion teams that began play in 2011.

The fan-created Heritage Cup competition with the San Jose Earthquakes began in the 2009 MLS season. MLS teams that carry on the names of their NASL predecessors are eligible to compete, but the Timbers and Whitecaps declined to participate. The winner is determined by league results over the final two matches in regular season play, followed by aggregate score if teams are tied. The rivalry cup's trophy was commissioned by the Soccer Silicon Valley Community Foundation and designed by a San Jose Earthquakes fan in collaboration with Sounders supporters.

Although there is no official rivalry between the Sounders and Los Angeles Galaxy, the two teams have met several times in the MLS Cup Playoffs. The relationship between former head coaches Bruce Arena and Sigi Schmid, the two most successful in league history, also played a factor in the clubs' rivalry. Schmid later served as the Galaxy's head coach from 2017 to 2018, shortly after his departure from the Sounders.

== Ownership and team management ==
Seattle Sounders FC head coaches

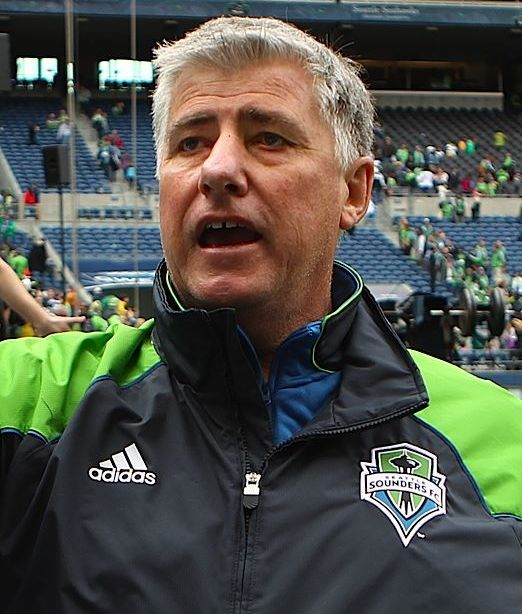
Sigi Schmid, 2009–2016

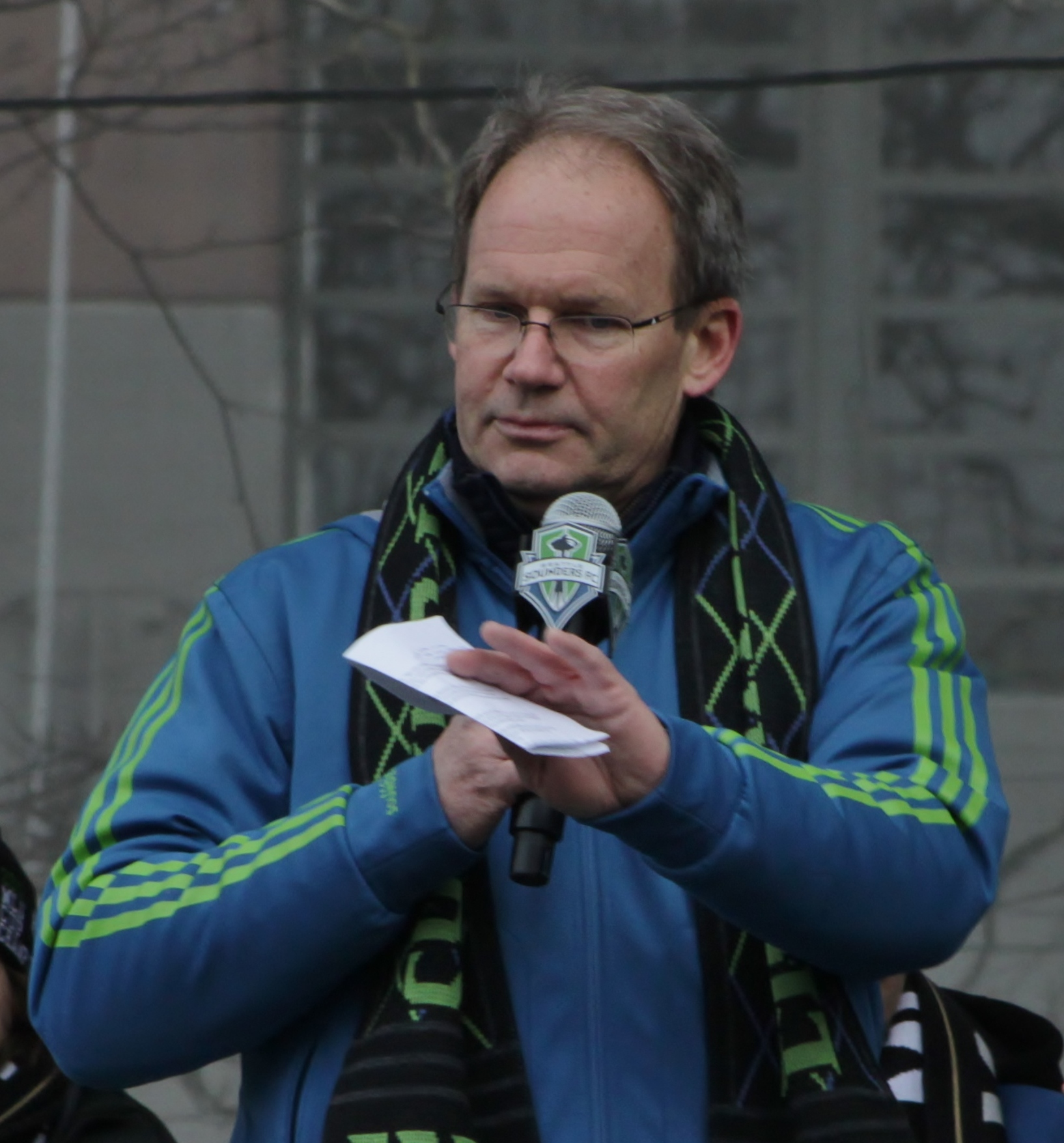
Brian Schmetzer, 2016–present

The ownership group of the club is composed of three owners and an ownership group composed of 17 families. The majority owner is Adrian Hanauer, the former owner of the now defunct USL-1 team Seattle Sounders. Independent minority owners include the estate of Paul Allen, Microsoft co-founder and owner of the Seattle Seahawks and Portland Trail Blazers, owned by Jody Allen; and Drew Carey, comedian and game show host. Seattle Reign FC of the National Women's Soccer League has been owned by the Sounders and the Carlyle Group since 2024; Hanauer and his mother Lenore were previously minority owners of the team from 2019 to 2020, though there was no affiliation between the two clubs. Paul Allen's partnership allowed for the team to share certain resources with the Seahawks, including over half of the team's full-time staff, with merged ticket, marketing, and financial operations. This arrangement ended on April 30, 2014, with the Sounders becoming a fully independent business operation.

Joe Roth was the majority owner from 2007 to 2015, when he ceded the role to Hanauer, who was replaced as general manager earlier that year. Roth departed the club's ownership group in 2019. He was replaced by Seattle Futbol Club LLC, formed by 11 families with ties to the Seattle area including former Microsoft executive Terry Myerson and his wife Katie Myerson, Russell Wilson, Ciara, Macklemore and Tricia Davis, Satya Nadella and Anu Nadella, Amy Hood and Max Kleinman, Joe Belfiore and Kristina Belfiore, S. Somasegar and Akila Somasegar, Chee Chew and Christine Chew, David Nathanson and Sabina Nathanson, Brian McAndrews and Elise Holschuh, and Mark Agne and Tomoko Agne. Myerson arranged for the investment through his connections and negotiations that took 15 months to complete. The expanded ownership group will have an executive board to decide on club matters. Peter Tomozawa and Donna LeDuc joined the new minority ownership group shortly afterwards, with Tomozawa taking over as president of business operations. In October 2020, Seattle Kraken team president Tod Leiweke and his wife, Tara, were announced as additional part-owners of the team. Retired baseball player Ken Griffey Jr. and his wife, Melissa, also joined the ownership group the following month. The team gained three additional part-owners in August 2023, comprising the families of Amazon executive Adam Selipsky, system integration consultant Rick Cantu, and real estate developer Jay Stein.

Brian Schmetzer is the Sounders' current head coach. He was promoted to interim head coach from his role as assistant coach after Sigi Schmid parted ways with the club on mutual terms in July 2016. Schmetzer was made permanent head coach in November 2016, following the team's qualification for that year's playoffs. The club's assistant coaches are Preki, Freddy Juarez, and Ricardo Clark; until 2021, the other assistant coaches under Schmetzer were Gonzalo Pineda (later head coach of Atlanta United FC) and Djimi Traoré. Tom Dutra was hired in 2008 as the club's goalkeeper coach.

Garth Lagerwey was hired from Real Salt Lake in January 2015 as the club's general manager and President of Soccer, replacing Adrian Hanauer. He left the club in November 2022 and was replaced by Craig Waibel, another former member of Real Salt Lake's staff. Prior to his appointment, Waibel was serving as the club's technical director, having replaced former MLS player and Everett native Chris Henderson in January 2021; Henderson had served in the role from January 24, 2009, until he left the club to join Inter Miami CF. Former Sounders defender Taylor Graham was hired as the club's Vice President of Business Operations in 2012, replacing longtime Seattle Seahawks executive Gary Wright. Tacoma native Hugh Weber was hired as the club's President of Business Operations in February 2023, replacing Tomozawa, who was named CEO of Seattle's organizing committee for the 2026 FIFA World Cup; Tomozawa kept his ownership stake in the club despite his departure from club operations.

SportsBusiness Journal and SportsBusiness Daily recognized Seattle Sounders FC as the Professional Sports Team of the Year in 2009 because of the team's record-setting success in attendance, as well as making the playoffs in its inaugural season. Former Seahawks and Sounders CEO Tod Leiweke was recognized by the Puget Sound Business Journal as the newspaper's 2009 Executive of the Year. Gary Wright was named MLS Executive of the Year in 2009. In 2012, he was named Seattle Sports Star Executive of the Year.

A 2015 study by Forbes ranked the Sounders number one in the league in terms of annual revenues ($50 million) and operating income ($10 million). Consequently, the Sounders were also ranked as the most valuable franchise ($245 million) in MLS – a 717% increase over the expansion fee it paid to join the league. The financial success of the team is driven in large part by their high attendance figures and local popularity. In 2019, the club announced that they would become carbon neutral by reducing emissions and purchasing offsets. They were the first professional soccer team in North America to make a commitment to carbon neutrality.

=== Reserves ===
The Sounders organization announced in 2014 that it would field a second-division reserve team in the United Soccer League, managed by the team and partially owned by members of a fan-owned group. The team, initially named Seattle Sounders FC 2 (S2), began play at the Starfire Sports Complex in 2015, under the management of former assistant coach Ezra Hendrickson. In 2017, the Sounders announced that the team would move to Cheney Stadium in Tacoma, with business operations transferred to the Tacoma Rainiers baseball club, ahead of a planned rebrand and soccer-specific stadium that had been planned to open in 2020. The team was renamed the Tacoma Defiance ahead of the 2019 season and began playing more matches in Tacoma. They moved to MLS Next Pro, a new reserve league for MLS teams, in 2022 following the end of the USL Championship's affiliation agreement.

=== Academy system ===
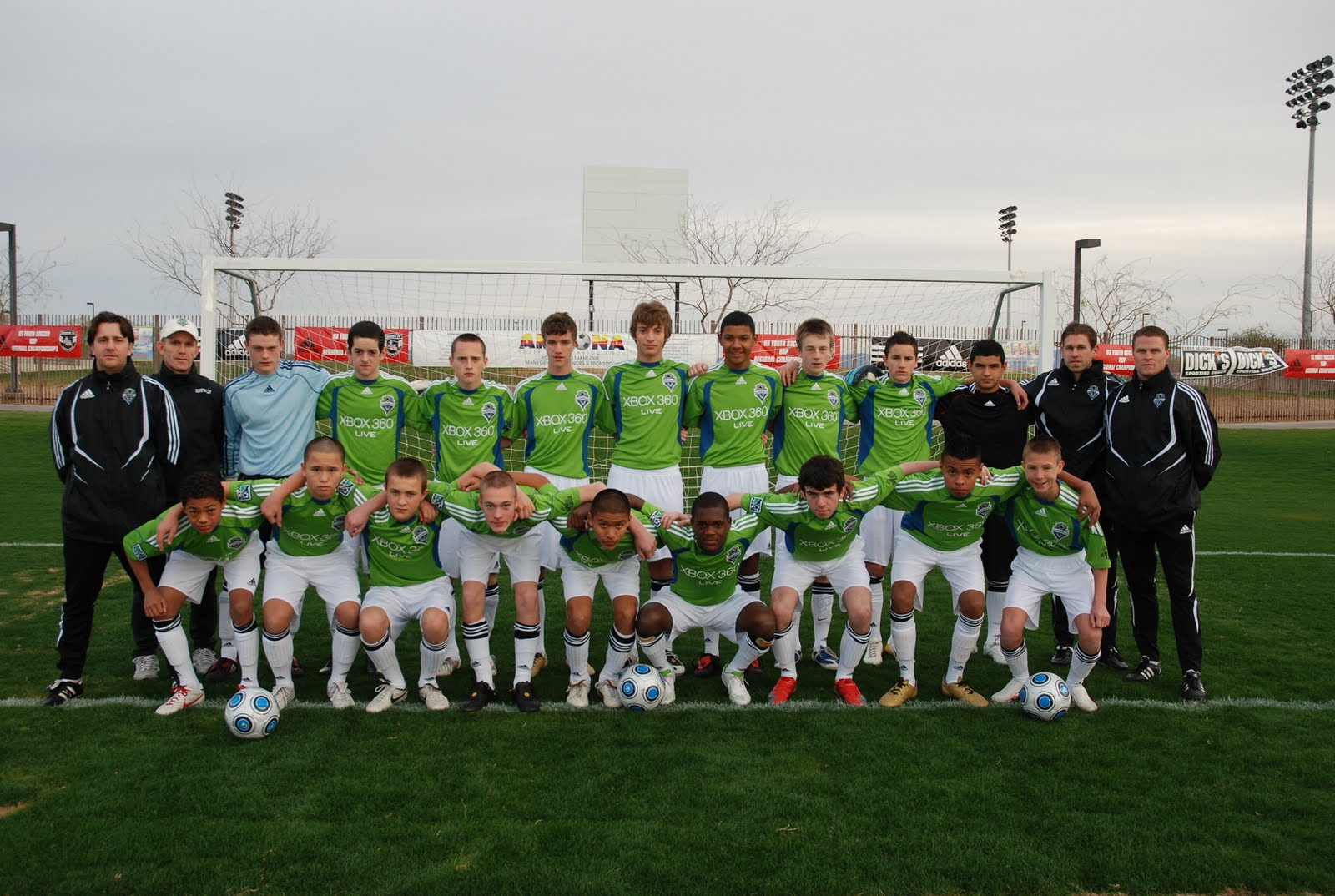
Sounders FC Youth, 2010

The Sounders established their affiliated academy team in 2010, and hired manager Dick McCormick and technical director Darren Sawatzky to develop local players. The academy fields teams in four age levels in the U.S. Soccer Development Academy system, and is affiliated with youth clubs in Washington, North Carolina, and Central California. Several academy products have been signed by the Sounders under the MLS Homegrown Player Rule, including DeAndre Yedlin, Sean Okoli, Jordan Morris, and Henry Wingo.

=== Affiliated teams ===
In January 2012, the Sounders announced a partnership for the Tacoma Tide, an amateur team in the USL Premier Development League, to rebrand as Seattle Sounders FC U-23 and appoint Darren Sawatzky as head coach. This team would field former academy players during their summers off from university teams. This branding agreement was terminated by the Sounders in January 2020.

From 2000 until 2020, the Sounders had a licensing agreement with an amateur women's team, Seattle Sounders Women, that first played at Memorial Stadium and then moved to the Starfire Sports Complex. The team was sold to the Tacoma Tides ownership group in 2006, but retained the Sounders name. This agreement was kept after the men's team joined MLS and was terminated by the Sounders in January 2020, leading the women's side to join the umbrella of amateur organization Sound FC. A beach soccer team, also named the Sounders, was fielded for the 2011 and 2012 editions of the Mundialito de Clubes.

In June 2024, the Sounders announced their acquisition of National Women's Soccer League side Seattle Reign FC as managing partner alongside the Carlyle Group. The front office for the Reign will move to Longacres and share facilities with the Sounders.

== Broadcasting ==
Beginning with the 2023 season, all MLS matches would be streamed worldwide by Apple on MLS Season Pass with most matches behind a paywall and some available for free. The league-wide deal replaces existing television and streaming contracts, including local partnerships for the Sounders and national broadcasts on linear and cable television.

From 2014 to 2022, television rights in English for regionally-broadcast matches were held by Fox owned-and-operated station KCPQ and sister station KZJO within the Seattle market. English television broadcasts were called by Keith Costigan alongside former Sounders goalkeeper Kasey Keller for color commentary and former Sounders midfielder Steve Zakuani for analysis. Previously, matches aired on KING-TV and KONG from 2009 to 2013. Matches were televised in Spanish on Univision station KUNS, anchored by Jaime Mendez with analysts Diego Arrioja and Jhon Kennedy Hurtado. In 2018, the team renewed its agreements with KCPQ and KZJO; in addition, the team announced a new streaming deal with YouTube TV for exclusive rights to stream the team's matches within Washington state. This replaced a previous syndication deal with Root Sports Northwest. In 2020, the team switched its streaming rights to Amazon Prime Video.

On radio, Sounders matches are called in English on 950 KJR AM by Danny Jackson with analysis from Brad Evans. Prior to the 2023 season, the commentary crew included Matt Johnson with analysis from Wade Webber, Steve Zakuani, and Pete Fewing. The station also airs a weekly show dedicated to the Sounders on Tuesdays. KKMO (El Rey 1360 AM) broadcasts matches and a weekly show in Spanish with commentary from Mario Rodriguez, Carlos Tapia, and Felipe Maqueda.

Former Seattle SuperSonics announcer Kevin Calabro and former U.S. soccer star Greg Vanney called the play-by-play for the local broadcasts during the Sounders' inaugural season in 2009. For the 2010 and 2011 seasons, they were replaced by former BBC cricket and general sport commentator Arlo White, who called English-language broadcasts without a partner. In 2012, White was hired by NBC Sports Network to be the voice of their soccer coverage. That led to BBC commentator Ross Fletcher becoming the club's television and radio play-by-play commentator beginning with the 2012 season, working alongside Kasey Keller as the color commentator. Fletcher left the club at the end of the 2015 season and was replaced by Keith Costigan.

== Players and staff ==
=== Roster ===
As of September 4, 2026

Note: Flags indicate national team as defined under FIFA eligibility rules; some limited exceptions apply. Players may hold more than one non-FIFA nationality.

No.	Pos.	Nation	Player
4	DF	USA	Ryan Sailor
5	DF	CMR	Nouhou Tolo
7	MF	USA	Cristian Roldan (captain)
8	MF	USA	Caden Clark
9	FW	SRB	Dejan Joveljić (DP)
10	MF	ARG	Pedro de la Vega (DP)
11	MF	SVK	Albert Rusnák
13	FW	USA	Jordan Morris (HGP & DP)
14	MF	USA	Paul Rothrock
16	DF	ESA	Alex Roldán
17	MF	USA	Paul Arriola
19	FW	MKD	Danny Musovski
20	DF	KOR	Kim Kee-hee
24	GK	SUI	Stefan Frei

No.	Pos.	Nation	Player
25	DF	USA	Jackson Ragen
26	GK	USA	Andrew Thomas
27	FW	USA	Jesús Ferreira
28	DF	COL	Yeimar Gómez Andrade
31	MF	USA	Hassani Dotson
35	DF	USA	Antino Lopez
37	MF	USA	Snyder Brunell (HG)
39	DF	USA	Stuart Hawkins (HG)
44	MF	SRB	Nikola Petković (on loan from Charlotte FC)
45	MF	USA	Peter Kingston
50	GK	CAN	Max Anchor
85	DF	USA	Kalani Kossa-Rienzi
90	MF	USA	Sebastian Gomez (HG)

=== Out on loan ===
Note: Flags indicate national team as defined under FIFA eligibility rules; some limited exceptions apply. Players may hold more than one non-FIFA nationality.

No.	Pos.	Nation	Player
33	DF	USA	Cody Baker (HG; on loan to New England Revolution)
36	FW	JPN	Yu Tsukanome (on loan to Pittsburgh Riverhounds)
95	FW	GUY	Osaze De Rosario (on loan to Sønderjyske)

=== Head coaches ===
Name	Nation	Tenure
Sigi Schmid	Germany	December 16, 2008 – July 26, 2016
Brian Schmetzer	United States	July 26, 2016 – November 1, 2016 (interim); November 2, 2016 – present

=== General managers ===
Name	Nation	Tenure
Adrian Hanauer	United States	2007–2015
Garth Lagerwey	United States	2015–2022
Craig Waibel	United States	2022–present

=== Sporting directors ===
Name	Nation	Tenure
Chris Henderson	United States	2008–2021
Craig Waibel	United States	2021–2022
Henry Brauner	Philippines	2023–present

=== Staff ===
As of January 13, 2026

Ownership and senior management
Majority owner	Adrian Hanauer (representing Hanauer Futból LLC)
Minority owner	Jody Allen (representing Vulcan Sports and Entertainment)
Minority owner	Drew Carey
Minority owner	Terry Myerson
Minority owner	Katie Myerson
Minority owner	Russell Wilson
Minority owner	Ciara
Minority owner	Macklemore
Minority owner	Tricia Davis
Minority owner	Tod Leiweke
Minority owner	Tara Leiweke
Minority owner	Satya Nadella
Minority owner	Anu Nadella
Minority owner	Ken Griffey Jr.
Minority owner	Melissa Griffey
Minority owner	Amy Hood
Minority owner	Max Kleinman
Minority owner	Joe Belfiore
Minority owner	Kristina Belfiore
Minority owner	Soma Somasegar
Minority owner	Akila Somasegar
Minority owner	Chee Chew
Minority owner	Christine Chew
Minority owner	David Nathanson
Minority owner	Sabina Nathanson
Minority owner	Brian McAndrews
Minority owner	Elise Holschuh
Minority owner	Mark Agne
Minority owner	Tomoko Agne
Minority owner	Peter Tomozawa
Minority owner	Donna LeDuc
Minority owner	Adam Selipsky
Minority owner	Rick Cantu
Minority owner	Jamie Cantu
Minority owner	Jay Stein
General manager and chief soccer officer	Craig Waibel
President of business operations	Hugh Weber
Sporting director and vice president of soccer	Henry Brauner
Director of development	Wade Webber
Head of professional player development	Craig Dalrymple
Coaching staff
Head coach	Brian Schmetzer
Assistant coach	Preki
Director of goalkeeping	Tom Dutra
Assistant coach	Freddy Juarez
Assistant coach	Ricardo Clark

== Honors ==
Domestic
Competitions	Titles	Seasons
MLS Cup	2	2016, 2019
Supporters' Shield	1	2014
U.S. Open Cup	4	2009, 2010, 2011, 2014
Western Conference (Playoffs)	4	2016, 2017, 2019, 2020
Western Conference (Regular Season)	1	2014
International
Competitions	Titles	Seasons
CONCACAF Champions League	1	2022
Leagues Cup	1^{s}	2025

Notes

- record
- ^{s} shared record

=== Awards ===
- MLS Fair Play Award: 2017
- CONCACAF Champions League Fair Play Award: 2022

== Team records ==
=== Year-by-year ===
Notes

== Player records ==
=== Top goalscorers ===
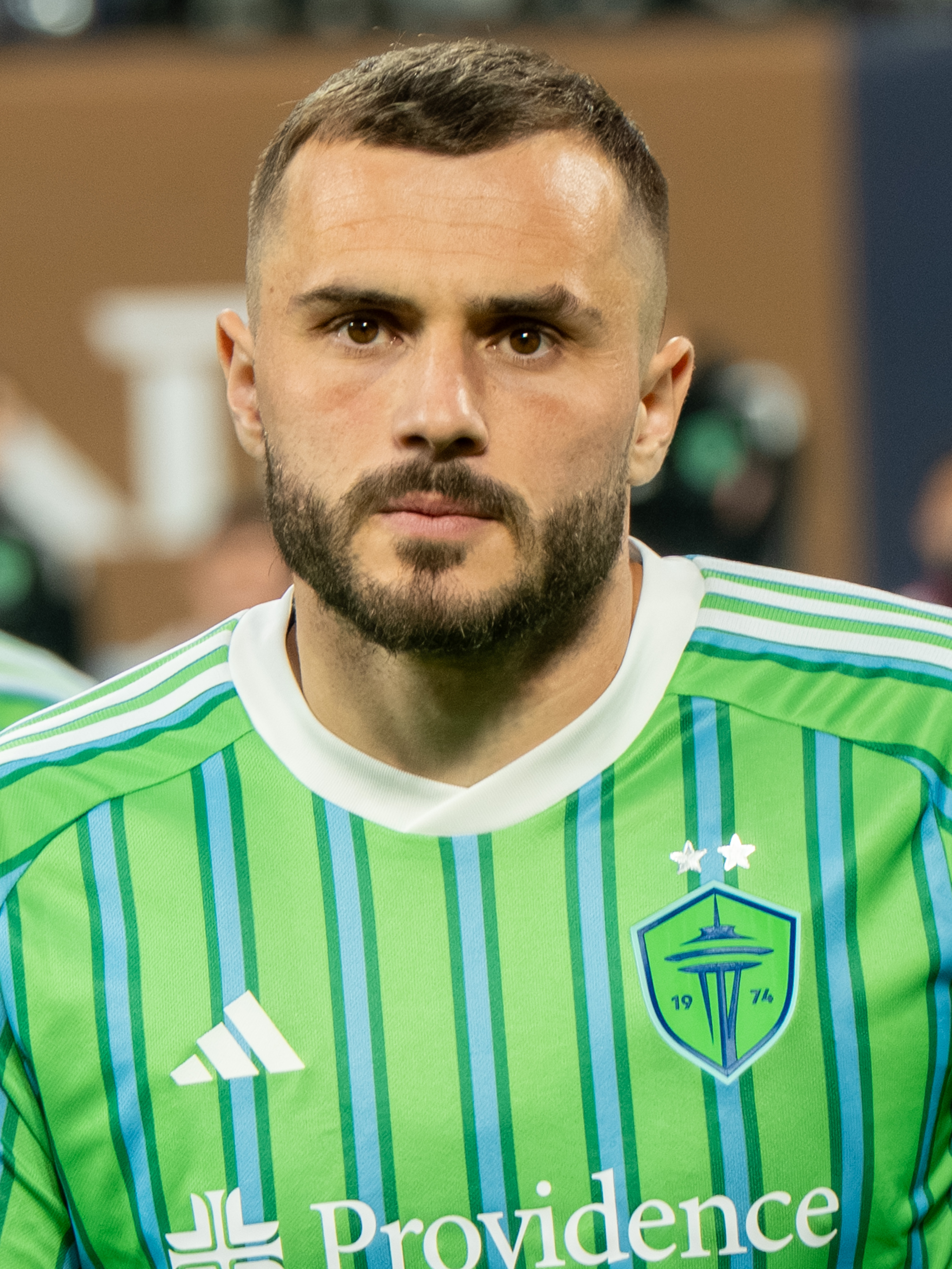
Jordan Morris is the team's all-time leading goalscorer

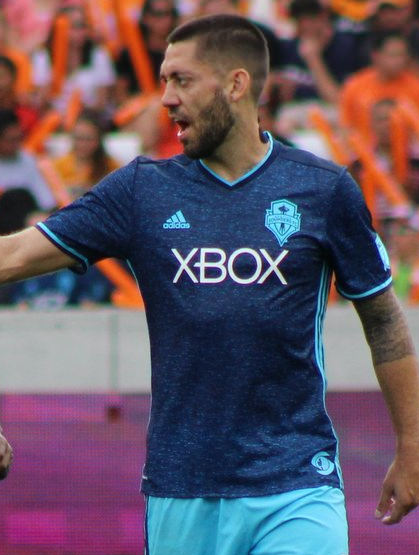
Clint Dempsey has the fifth-most goals in Sounders history

As of November 12, 2025

Leading career goal scorers
#	Name	Seattle career	Total	MLS regular season	Playoffs	U.S. Open Cup	Champions Cup	Leagues Cup	Club World Cup
1	(United States) **Jordan Morris**	2016–present	**91**	71	9	1	4	4	0
2	(Peru) Raúl Ruidíaz	2018–2024	**86**	72	9	0	3	2	0
3	(Colombia) Fredy Montero	2009–2014; 2021–2023	**79**	59	0	10	9	1	0
4	(Uruguay) Nicolás Lodeiro	2016–2023	**58**	41	8	0	7	2	0
5	(United States) Clint Dempsey	2013–2018	**57**	47	6	1	3	0	0
6	(United States) **Cristian Roldan**	2015–present	**44**	37	1	1	2	1	1
7	(Nigeria) Obafemi Martins	2013–2016	**43**	40	0	3	0	0	0
8	(Slovakia) **Albert Rusnák**	2022–present	**35**	28	3	0	2	1	1
9	(United States) Lamar Neagle	2009; 2011; 2013–2015; 2017–2018	**33**	27	1	1	4	0	0
10	(United States) Will Bruin	2017–2022	**32** (Note: Includes goal in MLS is Back Tournament knockout stage)	28	3	0	1	0	0

Bold signifies a current Sounders player

=== Most appearances ===
As of November 12, 2025

Most appearances (all competitions)
#	Name	Seattle career	Total	MLS regular season (Note: Includes appearances in the MLS is Back Tournament knockout stage)	Playoffs	U.S. Open Cup	Champions Cup	Leagues Cup	Club World Cup
1	(Switzerland) **Stefan Frei**	2014–present	422	352	39	3	20	4	4
2	(United States) **Cristian Roldan**	2015–present	392	308	35	7	23	15	4
3	(Cuba) Osvaldo Alonso	2009–2018	339	277	25	15	22	0	0
4	(Cameroon) **Nouhou**	2015–present	281	223	23	7	14	11	3
5	(United States) **Jordan Morris**	2016–present	271	214	27	4	17	7	2
6	(United States) Brad Evans	2009–2017	249	200	21	13	15	0	0
6	(El Salvador) **Alex Roldán**	2018–present	249	193	16	6	14	16	4
8	(Colombia) Fredy Montero	2009–2014; 2021–2023	247	191	11	16	25	3	1
9	(Uruguay) Nicolás Lodeiro	2016–2023	231	192	26	1	9	2	1
10	(Colombia) **Yeimar Gómez Andrade**	2018–present	209	167	15	2	10	14	1

Bold signifies a current Sounders player
