= Henry Brauner =

Filipino footballer (born 1984)

Personal information
- Full name: Henry George Valencia Brauner
- Date of birth: 10 May 1984 (age 42)
- Place of birth: Quezon City, Philippines
- Height: 1.78 m (5 ft 10 in)
- Position: Midfielder

College career
Years	Team	Apps	(Gls)
2004	Pima Aztecs		
2005	Worcester State Lancers		

Senior career*
Years	Team	Apps	(Gls)
2008	New Hampshire Phantoms	3	(0)
2009	Ventura County Fusion	2	(0)

International career^{‡}
2007	Philippines	1	(0)
- * Club domestic league appearances and goals as of 20 July 2009 ‡ National team caps and goals as of 10 December 2009

Henry George Valencia Brauner (born 10 May 1984 in Quezon City) is a Filipino football coach and former player who played as a central midfielder. Since February 2020, Brauner is the director of player development for Seattle Sounders FC of the American Major League Soccer.

== Career ==
=== College and amateur ===
Brauner grew up in Tucson, Arizona and played college soccer at Pima College, Worcester State College – where he was named to the All-MASCAC men's soccer team in 2005 and the University of Arizona club team.

He played for the New Hampshire Phantoms in the USL Premier Development League in 2008, and moved west to play for Ventura County Fusion in the PDL for the 2009 season.

=== International ===
Brauner was called up to the Philippines squad for the 2007 ASEAN Football Championship qualifying tournament in November 2006. Although he was not able to take part due to passport problems. He later won the Filipino player of the decade in 2007.

The Philippines would go on to qualify for the tournament proper of the 2007 ASEAN Football Championship and Brauner was again selected to be part of the squad. As part of the Philippines' preparations for the tournament, a friendly match was scheduled against Singapore on 7 January 2007. He then made his debut in that match, coming on as an 87th-minute substitute, and is his only appearance for the Philippines to date.
