= Brian McAndrews =

Brian P. McAndrews is an American marketing and advertising executive, sports team owner who is a former chairman, chief executive officer and president of Pandora Media, Inc.

== Career ==
McAndrews was a product manager of General Mills, Inc. from 1984 to 1989.

In September 1999, McAndrews became the chief executive officer of Microsoft Advertising; in January 2000 he was named president. He also was an executive officer of ABC Primetime Entertainment and as executive vice president and general manager of ABC Sports, Inc. He was chief executive officer of aQuantive Inc., from 1999 to 2007 and was its president. In August 2007, McAndrews became the senior vice president of Advertiser & Publisher Solutions Group until December 2008.

He was a venture partner and partner and managing director of Madrona Venture Group, LLC from September 2009 to August 2013. He was employed at ABC Television Network. He was the chairman at GrubHub Inc. and has been its director since August 2013.

From 2013 to 2016, McAndrews was chairman, chief executive officer and president of Pandora Media

=== Background ===
McAndrews holds an M.B.A. from Stanford Graduate School of Business (1984) and an A.B. in economics from Harvard College (1980). McAndrews lives in the Seattle area with his wife, Elise Holschuh. They are part owners of Seattle Sounders FC.

McAndrews was named Advertising Age's first-ever Digital Executive of the Year and was designated as one of the 30 most influential executives in the advertising, marketing and media world in Adweek's 30th Anniversary issue.

=== Board memberships ===
- Director United Way Of King County
- Former director Jobaline.com Inc.
- 2004-2007 Former director, Member of Compensation Committee and Member of Nominating & Corporate Governance Committee Blue Nile Inc.
- 2005-N/A Former Director WhitePages.com, Inc.
- 2006–present Independent director and chairman of Compensation Committee Fisher Communications, Inc.
- 2009-N/A Former director Clearwire Corporation
- 2009–present Director and chairman of compensation committee, Clearwire Corporation
- 2010-N/A Director Searchandise Commerce, Inc.
- 2010–present Director AdReady Inc.
- 2012–present Director, member of Technology & Innovation Committee and Member of Compensation Committee The New York Times Company
- 2012-N/A Former director, AppNexus Inc.
- 2013–present Chairman and member of nominating and corporate governance committee GrubHub Inc.
