= Hugh Weber =

American sports executive

Hugh Weber is an American sports executive currently serving as the CEO of the Edmonton Oilers. Weber was president of business operations for Seattle Sounders FC from 2023 through 2026. He previously served as president of the New Jersey Devils and its parent company Harris Blitzer Sports & Entertainment (HBSE) from 2013 to 2022. He previously served in the same position for the NBA's New Orleans Hornets. A native of Tacoma, Washington, Weber graduated from the University of Puget Sound, where he was also a member of their track team.
