= Peter G. Klein =

American Austrian School economist (born 1966)

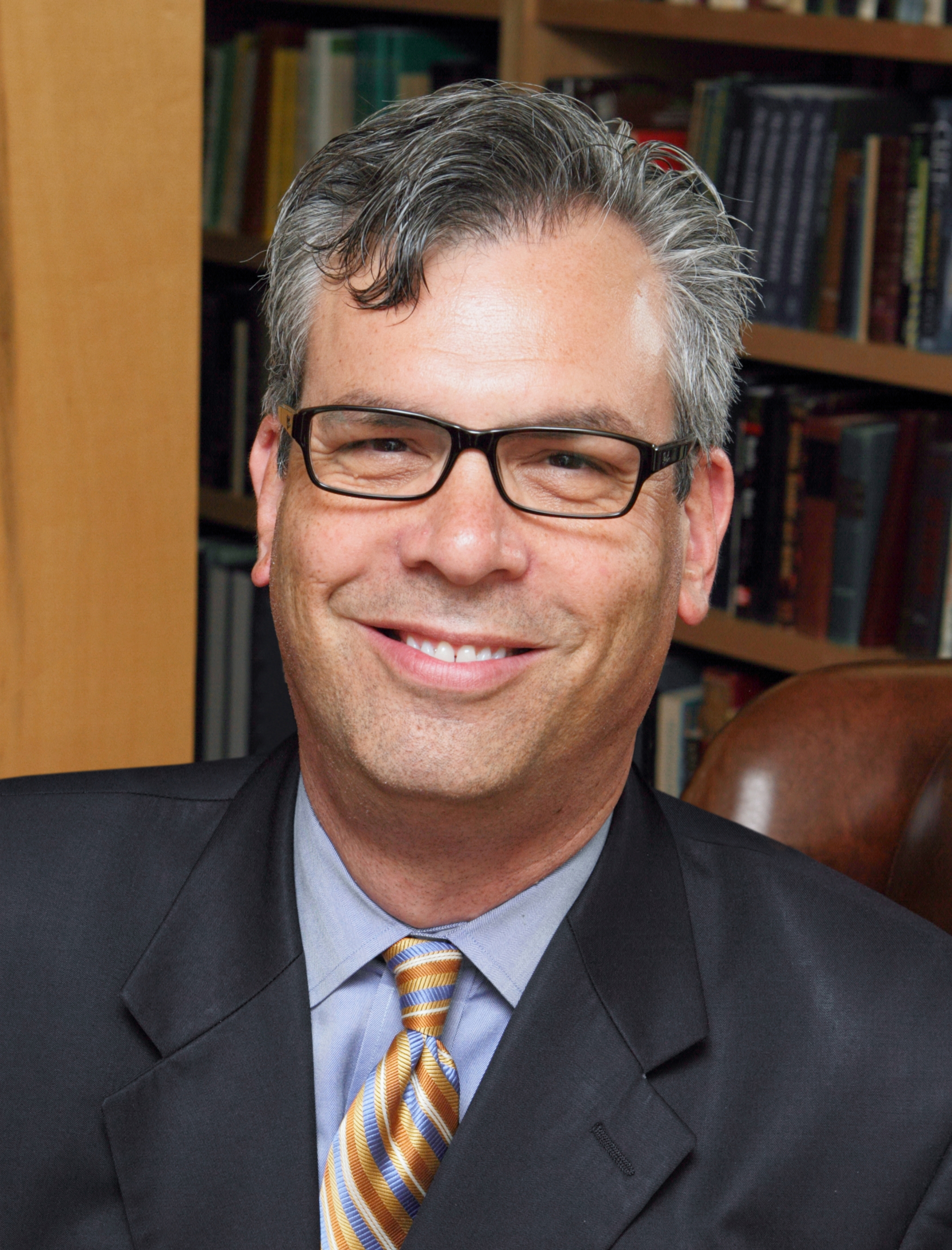
- Born: 1966 (age 59–60)

Academic background
- Education: UC Berkeley (PhD) 1995; University of North Carolina (B.A.) 1988
- Doctoral advisor: Oliver E. Williamson
- Influences: Friedrich Hayek, Oliver E. Williamson, Carl Menger, Friedrich von Wieser, Ludwig von Mises

Academic work
- Discipline: Managerial economics, Entrepreneurial econ, Innovation econ, Industrial econ
- School or tradition: Austrian School
- Institutions: Baylor University (2015-present); University of Missouri (2002–2015); University of Georgia (1995–2002); UC Berkeley (1989–94)
- Website: Information at IDEAS / RePEc

Peter Gordon Klein is an American economist. He holds the W. W. Caruth Endowed Chair and is a professor of entrepreneurship at Baylor University's Hankamer School of Business, where he is also chair of the Department of Entrepreneurship and Corporate Innovation. Klein is Academic Director of the Baugh Center for Entrepreneurship and Free Enterprise and Carl Menger Research Fellow at the Mises Institute. He serves as associated editor for Strategic Entrepreneurship Journal and associate editor of The Independent Review. His 2012 book Organizing Entrepreneurial Judgment (with Nicolai Foss, Cambridge University Press) won the 2014 Foundation for Economic Education Best Book Prize and has been translated into Polish and Persian.

== Specialization ==
Klein specializes in organizational economics, strategy, and entrepreneurship, with applications to corporate diversification, organizational design, and innovation. His books include Entrepreneurship and the Firm: Austrian Perspectives on Economic Organization (edited with Nicolai J. Foss, Edward Elgar, 2002), The Fortunes of Liberalism, volume 4 of The Collected Works of F. A. Hayek (University of Chicago Press, 1992), The Capitalist and the Entrepreneur: Essays on Organizations and Markets (Mises Institute, 2010), and Organizing Entrepreneurial Judgment: A New Approach to the Firm (with Nicolai J. Foss, Cambridge University Press, 2011).

Klein was a senior economist at the Council of Economic Advisers in the Clinton administration during the 2000–2001 academic year.

In 2012, he authored an article entitled "Entrepreneurs and Creative Destruction" in The 4% Solution: Unleashing the Economic Growth America Needs, published by the George W. Bush Presidential Center.

== Education ==
He received his Ph.D. in economics from the University of California, Berkeley, studying under 2009 Nobel Laureate Oliver E. Williamson, and his B.A. from the University of North Carolina at Chapel Hill.

== Teaching ==
Klein taught previously at the University of California, Berkeley, the University of Georgia, the Copenhagen Business School, Norwegian School of Economics, the Olin Business School at Washington University in St. Louis and Truman School of Public Affairs at the University of Missouri. Klein is currently the faculty advisor for Baylor's Young American's For Liberty chapter. He holds an honorary professorship at the Beijing Information Science and Technology University.
