= Peter Klein (CFO) =

American businessman

- Born: c. 1964 (age 61–62)
- Education: BA, Yale University; MBA, University of Washington (1990)
- Occupation: Chief Financial Officer at Microsoft
- Children: 2

Peter Klein is an American businessman mostly known for holding the chief financial officer position at Microsoft Corporation. On April 18, 2013, Microsoft announced Klein would be leaving the company at the end of Microsoft's current fiscal year.

He started at Microsoft in 2002 as the CFO of Microsoft's Server & Tools Business Group. He then served as the corporate vice president and CFO of Microsoft's Business Division (MBD), overseeing the financial performance of the division which includes the Microsoft Office System, Unified Communications, Microsoft Business Solutions, among others. After the departure of Chris Liddell in 2009, he was appointed the company's CFO, a position he held for 4 years, before resigning in 2013. He was succeeded by Amy Hood. After leaving Microsoft, Klein joined the board of F5.

Klein holds a bachelor's degree from Yale University and a Master of Business Administration from the University of Washington.
