= 2025 Seattle Sounders FC season =

American soccer team season

Seattle Sounders FC
2025 season
- General manager: Craig Waibel
- Head coach: Brian Schmetzer
- Stadium: Lumen Field
- Major League Soccer: Conference: 5th Overall: 10th
- MLS Cup playoffs: Round one
- CONCACAF Champions Cup: Round of 16
- FIFA Club World Cup: Group stage
- Leagues Cup: Winners
- Top goalscorer: League: Danny Musovski (14); All: Danny Musovski (18)
- Highest home attendance: League: 32,913 vs. Portland (Oct. 4); All: 69,314 vs. Miami (Aug. 31, Leagues Cup)
- Lowest home attendance: League: 30,041 vs. San Diego (May 28); All: 17,265 vs. Santos Laguna (Aug. 3, Leagues Cup)
- Average home league attendance: League: 30,993
- Biggest win: League: 4–0 at LA Galaxy (Aug. 10); All: 7–0 vs. Cruz Azul (July 31, Leagues Cup)
- Biggest defeat: League: 0–4 at LAFC (May 14)
Home colors	Away colors	Third colors

The 2025 season was the 17th season for Seattle Sounders FC in Major League Soccer (MLS), the top flight of professional club soccer in the United States. It was the 42nd season for a professional team bearing the Sounders name, which had originated in 1974 with the first incarnation of the franchise. The team remained under the management of Brian Schmetzer in his ninth full MLS season as head coach of the Sounders.

The Sounders played a total of 50 matches in MLS competitions, domestic cups, and two international tournaments organized by FIFA and CONCACAF. They qualified for the 2025 CONCACAF Champions Cup based on their 2024 regular season finish and entered in the first round. The team also played in the 2025 FIFA Club World Cup, which they qualified for as winners of the 2022 CONCACAF Champions League. The team played three group stage matches at their home stadium, Lumen Field in Seattle, Washington, and did not advance to the knockout stage.

The team won the 2025 Leagues Cup by defeating Inter Miami CF 3–0 in the final match, which was played at Lumen Field. It was their first Leagues Cup title and represented the final North American trophy that the club had yet to win. The Sounders finished fifth in the Western Conference standings during the regular season and qualified for the MLS Cup playoffs. They were eliminated in the first round by Minnesota United FC after a penalty shootout in the third and final match of the series. Across all competitions, the Sounders had a record of 23 wins, 13 losses, and 14 draws; Danny Musovski was the top goalscorer for the team with 18 goals in all competitions. The Sounders had an average home attendance of 30,993 during the regular season.

== Background ==
The Sounders are one of the most successful MLS teams, with two MLS Cup titles in four appearances since the hiring of head coach Brian Schmetzer in 2016. The team also won the 2022 CONCACAF Champions League and qualified for the 2023 FIFA Club World Cup under his tenure, which led to a multi-year contract extension in 2024. The Sounders played a total of 47 matches during the 2024 season across several competitions and finished with an overall record of 22 wins, 13 losses, and 12 draws. They spent the first half of the regular season with a losing record until adjustments to the formation; the Sounders had the best record during the latter half of the MLS season and conceded the fewest goals of any team during the regular season. The team relied heavily on homegrown players and did not sign new players during the summer transfer window despite limited playing time for their winter signings. The Sounders were eliminated in the semifinals of the U.S. Open Cup and quarterfinals of the Leagues Cup by Los Angeles FC, but defeated them in the MLS Cup Playoffs. The team were eliminated from the playoffs by the eventual league champion LA Galaxy in the Western Conference Final.

== Summary ==
=== Preseason ===
On December 4, 2024, the Sounders exercised contract options on six players and declined options on three others. Among the departures was Raúl Ruidíaz, the top goalscorer in the team's MLS era, who played seven seasons with the club. The Sounders announced a major trade with FC Dallas on January 8, 2025, to acquire American forward Jesús Ferreira in exchange for Brazilian midfielder Léo Chú, an international roster slot, and up to $2.3 million in conditional general allocation money. Under the three-year contract, Ferreira did not initially occupy a Designated Player slot. General manager Craig Waibel also announced that Jordan Morris would use a Designated Player slot due to meeting performance bonuses in his contract, while Albert Rusnák was re-signed to a new Designated Player contract. Midfielder João Paulo returned on a one-year contract with an option for a second year. On January 13, the Sounders signed midfielder Paul Arriola from FC Dallas in a trade for their 2026 MLS SuperDraft first-round pick and up to $300,000 in general allocation money.

The team's preseason training camp began in Renton on January 13, only 45 days after their final match of the 2024 playoffs. The Sounders entered preseason with no players listed as injured; Jesús Ferreira joined the team early from the United States national team, where he departed training camp to regain fitness after an earlier hamstring injury. The team traveled to the Marbella Football Center in Spain on January 20 to begin the second stage of their preseason, which included matches against European clubs. The initial preseason roster included 26 players signed to the first team and several callups from reserve team Tacoma Defiance. Korean defender Kim Kee-hee, who played for the Sounders in 2019, returned with the signing of a one-year contract on January 28.

During their first friendlies in Spain, the Sounders defeated Puskás Akadémia FC of Hungary and Aalborg BK of Denmark. The final two matches of the three-week camp were played against Swedish sides IFK Norrköping and Hammarby IF on the same day; both ended in draws. The team returned to the Longacres training facility on February 6 and played their final preseason friendly against Louisville City FC of the USL Championship. The Sounders won 4–0 with a brace from midfielder Pedro de la Vega in the first scrimmage and a 3–0 win in the second scrimmage. Midfielder Josh Atencio was traded to the Colorado Rapids on February 15 for $1.3 million in general allocation money to be split between two seasons.

The club introduced a new secondary jersey for the 2025 season, named the "Salish Sea Kit", in February 2025. It uses several shades of blue arranged in triangular Salish weaving patterns with light blue and green accents. The jersey was designed in collaboration with three Coast Salish artists from local tribes: Connie McCloud of the Puyallup Tribe, Gail White Eagle of the Muckleshoot Tribe, and Danielle Morsette of the Suquamish Tribe. The jersey included the Southern Lushootseed phrase x̌ax̌aʔ ti qʷuʔ and its English translation ("water is sacred") on the front and a stylized orca tail on the back. It was the first Sounders jersey to be primarily blue since the Pacific Blue kit used in the 2016 and 2017 seasons. A blue-and-white throwback kit, named the "Orca Kit", was introduced in July to commemorate the 30th anniversary of the 1995 A-League championship won by the Sounders' previous incarnation.

=== February–June: Champions Cup and regular season ===
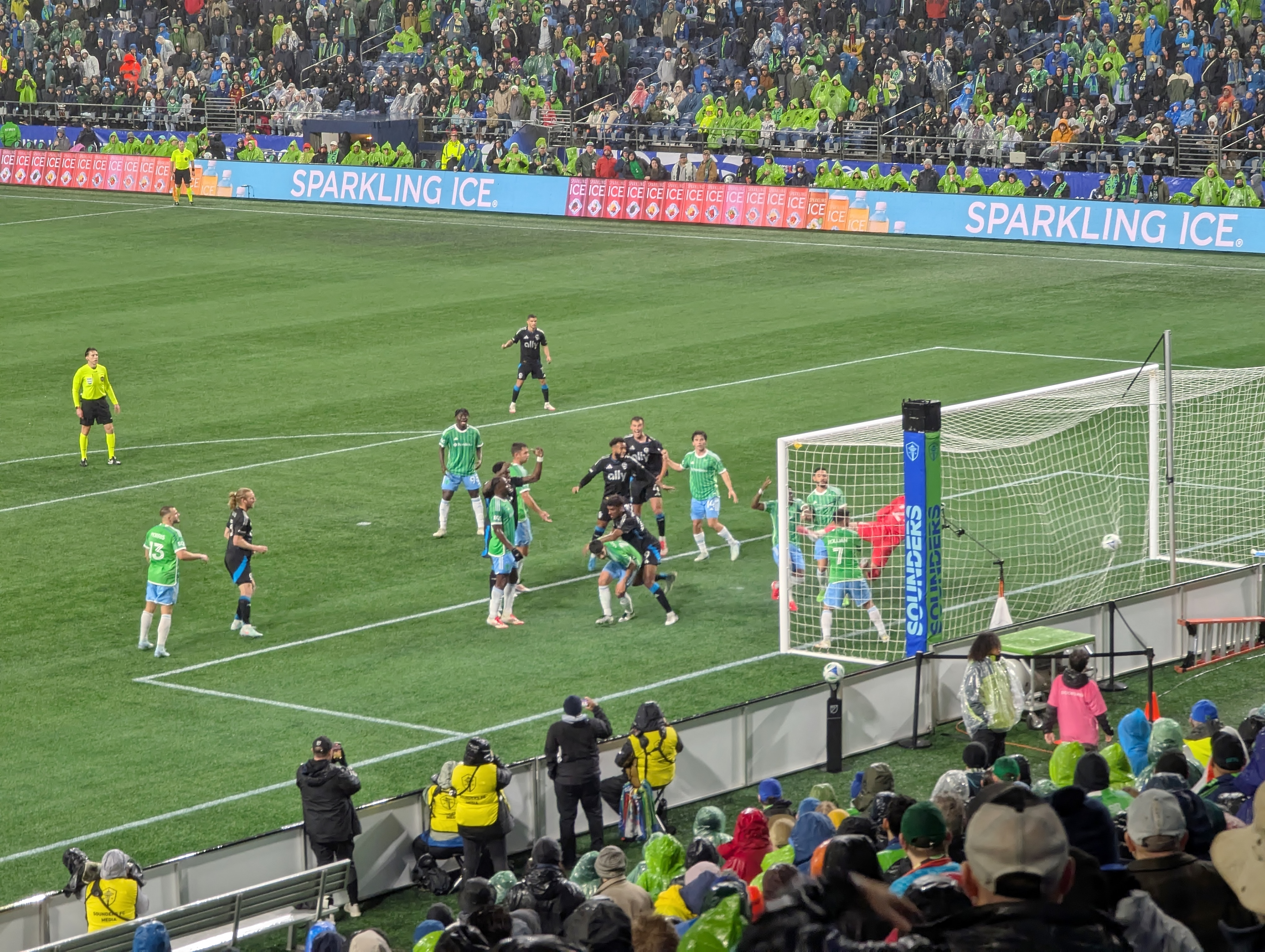
The first regular season goal conceded by the Sounders against Charlotte FC, February 22

The Sounders opened their season on February 19 with the first round of 2025 CONCACAF Champions Cup, their eighth appearance in the competition, against Guatemalan club Antigua GFC. They won 3–1 in the away leg with Paul Arriola scoring in the third minute, followed by Pedro de la Vega and Albert Rusnák in the second half; it was the team's first away victory in Central America since 2012. The Sounders returned to Seattle for their first match of the MLS regular season, which they hosted three days later against Charlotte FC. The teams drew 2–2 with two goals from Jordan Morris and an own goal in stoppage time by Yeimar Gómez Andrade. The brace from Morris allowed him to match Raúl Ruidíaz's club-record 86 goals. In the second leg against Antigua GFC, the Sounders won 3–1 at home with Arriola scoring again and a brace from de la Vega.

In their first away match of the regular season, the team traveled to Real Salt Lake and were held scoreless in a 2–0 loss at America First Field in Sandy, Utah. The Sounders extended their winless streak in regular season play that began in 2011 after defender Nouhou scored an own goal early in the match and the team conceded a 79th minute goal to Forster Ajago. The Sounders returned to Seattle four days later for the first leg of their Champions Cup round of 16 series against Cruz Azul, one of the most successful Liga MX teams. They played to a scoreless draw while several starting players for Cruz Azul were rested. The team earned their first win of the regular season with a rotated lineup that defeated Los Angeles FC 5–2. Loaned defender Kalani Kossa-Rienzi opened the scoring in the 11th minute and was followed by four goals in the second half. Jordan Morris scored his 87th goal across all competitions for the Sounders, surpassing the all-time record across all three iterations of the club.

The Sounders were eliminated from the Champions Cup after losing 4–1 in their second leg against Cruz Azul, which was played at the Estadio Olímpico Universitario in Mexico City. During the match, Arriola tore his left anterior cruciate ligament, while Morris injured his hamstring. The team's unbeaten streak in CONCACAF play ended at 13 matches, which set the record for longest in MLS history. The Sounders returned to MLS play with a four-match winless streak that included three shutouts, among them a 3–0 loss to expansion side San Diego FC. Arriola was placed on the season-ending injury list to free up space in the salary cap to sign another midfielder; his replacement, English winger Ryan Kent, was signed on March 31 outside of the normal transfer window.

Danny Musovski, who had become the starting striker after Jordan Morris was injured twice, scored in five consecutive matches, of which the Sounders won four and drew once to begin a stretch of road games. After a loss and a draw on the road, the Sounders returned to Lumen Field and won a pair of matches but conceded their first home loss to Minnesota United FC. The match had been preceded by a protest by the team's players, who sought a share of prize money for the FIFA Club World Cup. Majority owner Adrian Hanauer declined to comment, but confronted the team's players according to media reports. The Sounders ended their first half of league play with a 3–0 loss to Vancouver Whitecaps FC, who fielded several reserve players due to cases of food poisoning after the Champions Cup final. Through the first half of the season, the team mostly played in a 3–4–3 formation that used pairs of wide midfielders and attacking midfielders to control the attacking third.

=== Club World Cup and unbeaten streak ===
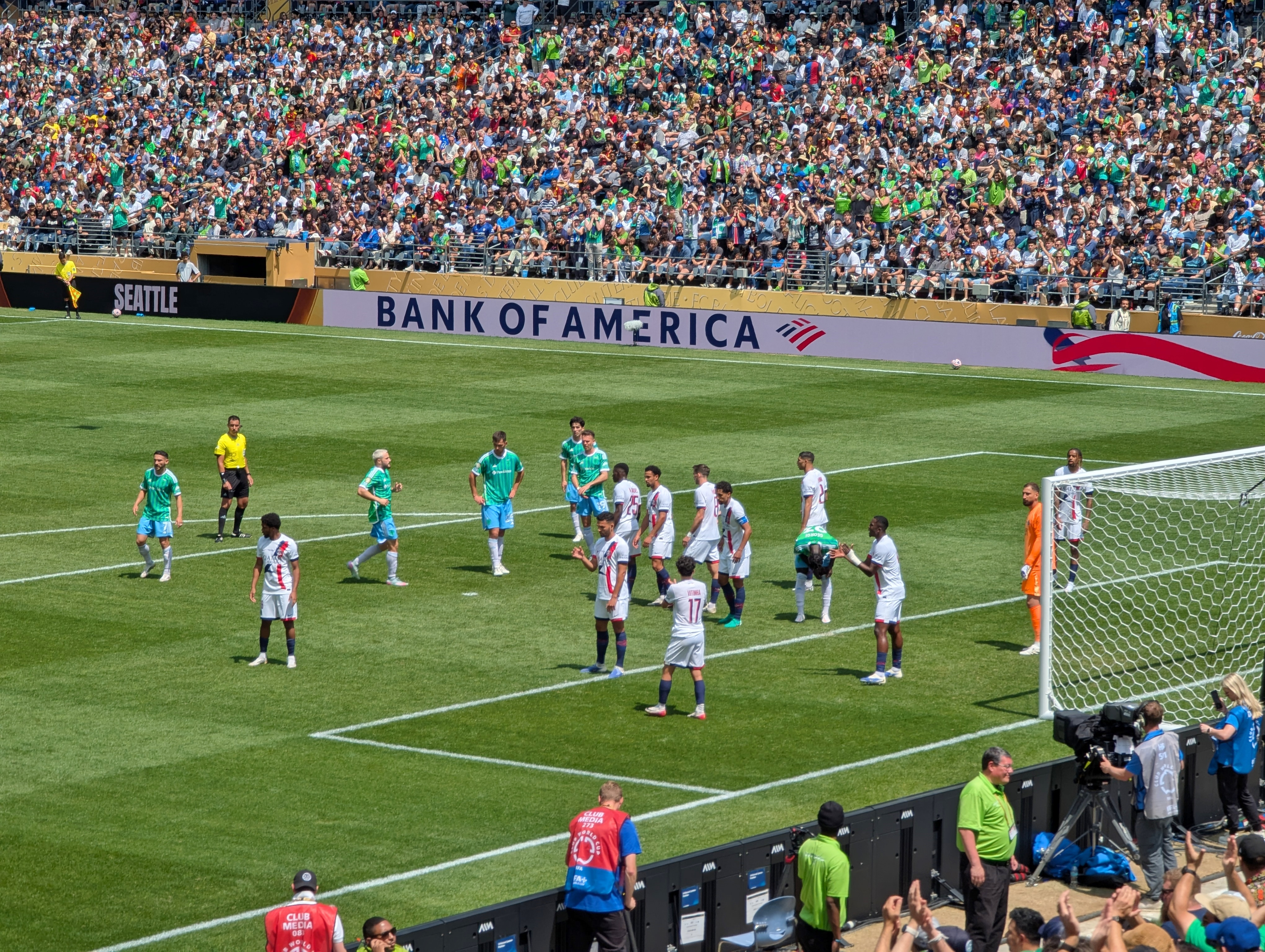
The Sounders prepare to take a corner kick against Paris Saint-Germain during the 2025 FIFA Club World Cup

The team qualified for the expanded FIFA Club World Cup as winners of the 2022 CONCACAF Champions League and Seattle was named one of the host cities for the 32-team tournament. The Sounders were drawn into Group B, labeled the "group of death", alongside Botafogo of Brazil (winners of the Copa Libertadores), Atlético Madrid of Spain, and Paris Saint-Germain of France (winners of the UEFA Champions League). The MLS regular season was paused for the duration of the Club World Cup's group stage in June; the artificial surface at Lumen Field was covered by a temporary grass pitch for the six matches it hosted during the tournament. The Sounders opened the group stage with a 2–1 loss to Botafogo after they conceded two goals in the first half. Cristian Roldan became the first MLS player to score in the Club World Cup with his header in the 75th minute, but the team were unable to score an equalizer despite a 23–12 advantage in shots.

The Sounders made five changes to the starting lineup and were defeated 3–1 by Atlético Madrid in the second match, which featured three goals in an eight-minute span. Pablo Barrios opened the scoring for Atlético Madrid in the 11th minute, but the home side had several scoring chances in the first half. Axel Witsel extended the lead in the 47th minute, but Albert Rusnák broke the shutout with a deflected shot in the 50th minute. Barrios scored his second goal of the match in the 55th minute. The Sounders were eliminated from the Club World Cup with a 2–0 loss to Paris Saint-Germain in their third group stage match, having needed a four-goal win and a favorable result in another match to advance to the knockout stage. Khvicha Kvaratskhelia scored with his shoulder on a deflected shot in the 35th minute and was followed by a finish by Achraf Hakimi in the 66th minute. The Sounders earned $9.55 million in prize money as group stage participants from CONCACAF and distributed $1.4 million to players per an agreement between MLS and the MLS Players Association. The team had an average of 44,138 spectators for its three Club World Cup matches, with Atlético Madrid and Paris Saint-Germain both drawing over 50,000.

The team received praise for their Club World Cup performance, including from Paris Saint-Germain manager Luis Enrique, and returned to MLS play at seventh place in the Western Conference. The Sounders were undefeated through the end of July with six matches evenly split between wins and draws despite injuries to several key players. The first three matches of the run were marred by a series of red cards issued to the team's players, including an incident in which defender Nouhou threw a ball at a fan in Kansas City, Kansas, and was suspended for two matches. Goalkeeper Stefan Frei left in stoppage time of a match against the Columbus Crew with a concussion after an accidental collision with Amar Sejdić; he missed several matches during his six-week recovery and was replaced by backup goalkeeper Andrew Thomas. The unbeaten streak ended at ten matches across all competitions with a 1–0 away loss to Minnesota United FC on August 16.

=== Leagues Cup title and regular season finish ===
The Sounders were one of eighteen MLS teams to play in the 2025 Leagues Cup, an international tournament held by MLS and Liga MX of Mexico. As a result, the team did not play in the 2025 U.S. Open Cup and were instead be represented by reserve team Tacoma Defiance. They opened the three-match Leagues Cup league stage with a 7–0 defeat of Cruz Azul at Lumen Field, setting a record for the largest margin of victory for an MLS team against a Liga MX opponent. All seven goals were scored in the second half, with two from Pedro de la Vega; his second goal, a volley in the opening minute of stoppage time, was nominated for a FIFA Puskás Award. The Sounders then won 2–1 against Santos Laguna in the second match, which ended with the winning goal scored by winger Georgi Minoungou shortly before he was ejected for a second yellow card during his celebration. Seattle finished the league phase with a 2–1 defeat of Club Tijuana in the third matchday after they had conceded in the first half's stoppage time. The Sounders were the only team to win all three matches in the league phase and finished atop the MLS table.

Seattle played to a scoreless draw against Club Puebla in the quarterfinals and won 4–3 in the penalty shootout, during which Andrew Thomas made two saves. Danny Musovski, the team's starting striker, was sent off during a dispute with the referee and suspended for the remainder of the tournament; rookie Osaze De Rosario was the starter in the final two matches for the team. The Sounders qualified for the Leagues Cup final with a 2–0 win against the LA Galaxy, who hosted the semifinal due to their seeding as MLS Cup 2024 champions. Seattle hosted the final against Inter Miami CF at Lumen Field and drew a tournament-record crowd of 69,314 spectators. The Sounders won 3–0 with goals from De Rosario, Alex Roldán, and Paul Rothrock. The post-match ceremony was delayed after a fight broke out between players and staff from both teams; Luis Suárez spat on a Sounders staffer and was subsequently suspended. It was the team's first Leagues Cup title and the final North American trophy that the club had yet to win.

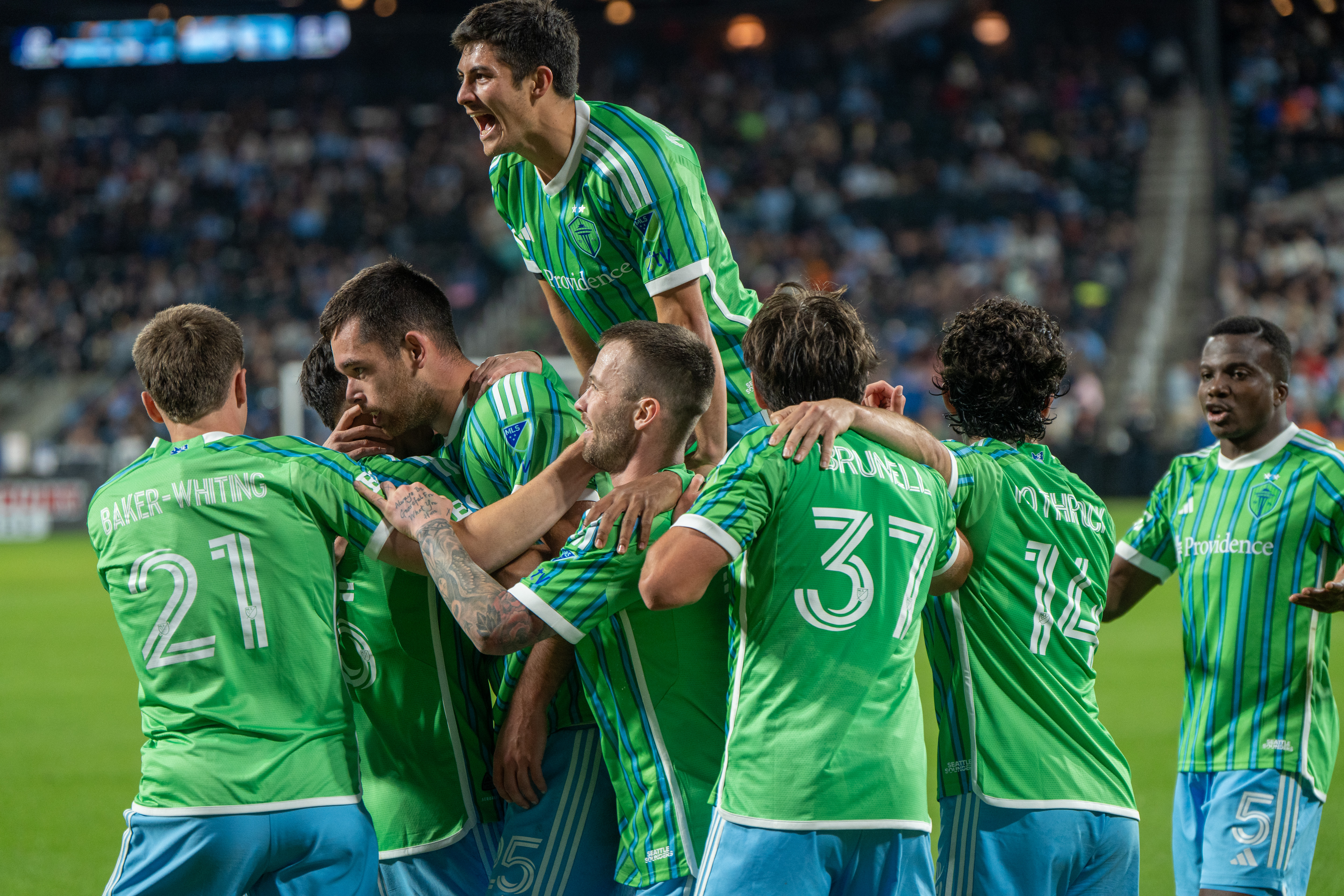
The Sounders celebrate a goal scored by Jackson Ragen during the regular season finale against New York City FC.

Between the quarterfinals and semifinals of the Leagues Cup, the team defeated Sporting Kansas City 5–2 in their sole regular season match. Musovski became the eighth player to score a hat-trick in MLS play for the Sounders. After the Leagues Cup final and a two-week break for national team competitions, the Sounders returned to play the remaining seven matches of the regular season. The team drew 2–2 with the LA Galaxy at home and were defeated 3–1 by Inter Miami CF in Fort Lauderdale, Florida, in a rematch of the Leagues Cup final. The Sounders were winless through September, which ended with a 2–2 draw with Vancouver, but qualified for the MLS Cup playoffs while awaiting the return of several key players from their injuries. The team won at home against the Portland Timbers for the first time in eight years with a 1–0 score as all three Designated Players started for the first time since July. Due to their lack of available outfield players, the team signed three reserve players from the Tacoma Defiance under the "extreme hardship" rules set by MLS. The Sounders finished the regular season with a 2–1 win against New York City FC at Citi Field in New York City, but lost Pedro de la Vega to a knee injury.

=== Playoffs exit and aftermath ===
The Sounders finished fifth in the Western Conference and entered the MLS Cup playoffs in the best-of-three round against Minnesota United FC, who were the fourth seed and held home-field advantage. The first leg, hosted by Minnesota United FC, was a scoreless draw that ended with a 3–2 win in the penalty shootout for the home team. The Sounders returned to Lumen Field for the second leg and opened the match with three goals in the first half but conceded two goals to Minnesota in stoppage time for a half-time score of 3–2. The team held the score and added a goal from Paul Rothrock in the 86th minute to win 4–2. The deciding third leg, played once again in Minnesota, began with two goals in the opening eight minutes for the Sounders; a red card was shown to Minnesota's Joseph Rosales before half-time, which gave Seattle an advantage in numbers. The team conceded three goals to Minnesota United FC, but Jordan Morris scored in the 88th minute to preserve a 3–3 draw; goalkeeper Stefan Frei was substituted for backup Andrew Thomas for the penalty shootout. Thomas dislocated his finger during the first round of the shootout, but continued and made several saves; the match ended in the tenth round with Minnesota goalkeeper Dayne St. Clair scoring and Thomas missing his follow-up.

The team were eliminated from the playoffs and had an overall record of 23 wins, 13 losses, and 14 draws during the 2025 season. The Sounders scored 87 goals, setting a new team record, and Danny Musovski was the top goalscorer for the team with 18 goals in all competitions. The team had one loss in their 17 home matches during the regular season, which matched a franchise record. Midfielder Cristian Roldan was named to the MLS Best XI and called up to the United States national team based on his performance with the Sounders during the season. The Sounders had an average home attendance of 30,993 during the regular season, ranking third among MLS teams behind Atlanta United FC and Charlotte FC. They were also the only MLS team to not pay a transfer fee for a foreign transaction during the 2025 season.

During the 2025–26 offseason, the Sounders released several key players into free agency or declined contract options. João Paulo announced his departure after six seasons, while homegrown player Danny Leyva was signed by Club Necaxa in Liga MX. Stefan Frei and Paul Rothrock, who both became free agents, were signed to new contracts. The Sounders entered the 2026 season with a modified scheduled to accommodate renovations to Lumen Field for the 2026 FIFA World Cup. The team participated in the 2026 CONCACAF Champions Cup due to their Leagues Cup title as well as the 2026 Leagues Cup.

== Non-competitive matches ==
=== Preseason ===
The preseason schedule was released by Seattle Sounders FC on January 21, 2025.

January 23	Seattle Sounders FC	2–0	Puskás Akadémia FC	Marbella, Spain
7:00 am PST	De la Vega 20'; Morris 31'	Report		Stadium: Marbella Football Center

January 31	Seattle Sounders FC	5–3	Aalborg BK	Marbella, Spain
6:00 am PST	De la Vega 42'; Rusnák 54'; Brunell 77'; Ferreira 103'; Vargas 134'	Report	Jørgensen 30'; Adedeji 122'; Helenius 131'	Stadium: Banús Football Center
Note: Played as three 45-minute periods.

February 5	Seattle Sounders FC	3–3	IFK Norrköping	Marbella, Spain
4:00 am PST	Rothrock 21'; João Paulo 29'; Sousa 55'	Report	Nyman 12', 26', 33'	Stadium: La Quinta Football Center

February 5	Seattle Sounders FC	2–2	Hammarby IF	Marbella, Spain
7:00 am PST	Ragen (yellow card) 20'; Ferreira 41'; A. Roldán 45'; Nouhou (yellow card) 73'	Report	J. Karlsson (yellow card) 24'; Boudah 60', (yellow card) 74'; Strand 89'	Stadium: Marbella Football Center

February 12	Seattle Sounders FC	4–0	Louisville City FC	Renton, Washington
10:30 am PST	De la Vega 23', 79'; C. Roldan 24'; Yeimar 39'	Report		Stadium: Providence Swedish Performance Center & Clubhouse; Attendance: 0 (closed doors)

February 12	Seattle Sounders FC	3–0	Louisville City FC	Renton, Washington
12:00 pm PST	Hawkins 28'; Not listed 52' (o.g.); Musovski 82'	Report		Stadium: Providence Swedish Performance Center & Clubhouse; Attendance: 0 (closed doors)

== Competitions ==
The Sounders played a total of 50 matches during the 2025 season due to their participation in multiple competitions. In addition to their MLS regular season play, the team participated in the 2025 CONCACAF Champions Cup beginning in February, the 2025 FIFA Club World Cup in June and July, and the 2025 Leagues Cup in July and August. The Sounders did not participate in the 2025 U.S. Open Cup, which is limited to 16 entrants from MLS, and was instead represented by their MLS Next Pro affiliate, Tacoma Defiance.

=== Major League Soccer ===
==== League tables ====
MLS Western Conference table (2025)
Pos	Team	Pld	W	L	T	GF	GA	GD	Pts	Qualification
3	Los Angeles FC	34	17	8	9	65	40	+25	60	Qualification for round one
4	Minnesota United FC	34	16	8	10	56	39	+17	58	Qualification for round one
5	Seattle Sounders FC	34	15	9	10	58	48	+10	55	Qualification for round one
6	Austin FC	34	13	13	8	37	45	−8	47	Qualification for round one
7	FC Dallas	34	11	12	11	52	55	−3	44	Qualification for round one

Source: MLS
Rules for classification: 1) points; 2) total wins; 3) total goal differential; 4) total goals scored; 5) fewer disciplinary points; 6) away goal differential; 7) away goals scored; 8) home goals differential; 9) home goals scored; 10) coin toss (2 clubs tied) or drawing of lots (≥3 clubs tied)

Overall MLS standings table (2025)
Pos	Team	Pld	W	L	T	GF	GA	GD	Pts	Qualification
8	Minnesota United FC	34	16	8	10	56	39	+17	58	
9	New York City FC	34	17	12	5	50	44	+6	56	
10	Seattle Sounders FC (L)	34	15	9	10	58	48	+10	55	Qualification for the CONCACAF Champions Cup round of 16 (Note: As winners of Leagues Cup)
11	Nashville SC (U)	34	16	12	6	58	45	+13	54	Qualification for the CONCACAF Champions Cup round one (Note: As winners of U.S. Open Cup)
12	Columbus Crew	34	14	8	12	55	51	+4	54	

Source: MLS
Rules for classification: 1) points; 2) total wins; 3) total goal differential; 4) total goals scored; 5) fewer disciplinary points; 6) away goal differential; 7) away goals scored; 8) home goals differential; 9) home goals scored; 10) coin toss (2 clubs tied) or drawing of lots (≥3 clubs tied)
(L) Leagues Cup winners; (U) U.S. Open Cup winners

==== Results summary ====
Overall								Home						Away					
Pld	W	D	L	GF	GA	GD	Pts	W	D	L	GF	GA	GD	W	D	L	GF	GA	GD
34	15	10	9	58	48	+10	55	10	6	1	38	20	+18	5	4	8	20	28	−8

Last updated: October 11, 2025.
Source: MLS

Results by Matchday
Matchday	1	2	3	4	5	6	7	8	9	10	11	12	13	14	15	16	17	18	19	20	21	22	23	24	25	26	27	28	29	30	31	32	33	34
Stadium	H	A	H	A	H	A	A	A	H	A	H	A	A	A	H	H	H	A	H	H	A	H	H	A	A	A	H	H	H	A	A	H	H	A
Result	D	L	W	L	D	D	L	W	W	D	W	W	L	D	W	W	L	L	W	D	W	D	W	D	W	L	W	D	L	L	D	W	W	W
Conf. Position	7	12	8	10	12	11	12	10	8	9	7	5	6	6	5	4	4	6	5	5	4	5	4	4	4	4	4	4	4	5	5	5	5	5

Source: MLS
A = Away; H = Home; W = Win; D = Draw; L = Loss

==== Regular season ====
The MLS regular season schedule was released on December 19, 2024. The Sounders played 34 matches—17 at home and 17 away—primarily against the 14 other teams in the Western Conference; the team played six opponents from the Eastern Conference. The regular season included a break for the FIFA Club World Cup and CONCACAF Gold Cup in June but continued through the Leagues Cup in August, unlike previous seasons.

February 22 1	Seattle Sounders FC	2–2	Charlotte FC	Seattle, Washington
7:30 pm PST	Nouhou (yellow card) 2'; Morris 19', 49'	Report	Malanda 35'; Abada (yellow card) 59'; Yeimar 90+3' (o.g.)	Stadium: Lumen Field; Attendance: 30,055; Referee: Filip Dujic

March 1 2	Real Salt Lake	2–0	Seattle Sounders FC	Sandy, Utah
1:30 pm PST	Nouhou 8' (o.g.); Brown (yellow card) 56'; Ajago 79', (yellow card) 90+4'	Report	Nouhou (yellow card) 25'	Stadium: America First Field; Attendance: 18,853; Referee: Ricardo Fierro

March 8 3	Seattle Sounders FC	5–2	Los Angeles FC	Seattle, Washington
1:45 pm PST	Kossa-Rienzi 11'; Rothrock 57'; Morris 77'; C. Roldan 84'; Rusnák 90+4'	Report	Ordaz 38'; Tafari (yellow card) 69'; Martínez 90+2'	Stadium: Lumen Field; Attendance: 30,107; Referee: Drew Fischer

March 15 4	St. Louis City SC	1–0	Seattle Sounders FC	St. Louis, Missouri
5:30 pm PDT	Löwen 15'; Kessler (yellow card) 72'; Becher (yellow card) 81'	Report	Ragen (yellow card) 14'; Ferreira (yellow card) 45+1'; Vargas (yellow card) 64'; A. Roldán (yellow card) 83'	Stadium: Energizer Park; Attendance: 22,422; Referee: Fotis Bazakos

March 22 5	Seattle Sounders FC	0–0	Houston Dynamo FC	Seattle, Washington
7:30 pm PDT		Report	Bassi (yellow card) 69'; Urso (yellow card) 71'; Steres (yellow card) 78'; Escobar (yellow card) 79'	Stadium: Lumen Field; Attendance: 31,293; Referee: Allen Chapman

March 29 6 (HC)	San Jose Earthquakes	1–1	Seattle Sounders FC	San Jose, California
7:30 pm PDT	Leroux 32'; Espinoza (yellow card) 35'; Bouda (yellow card) 59'	Report	Rusnák 80'; Ragen (yellow card) 90+2'	Stadium: PayPal Park; Attendance: 15,228; Referee: Guido Gonzales Jr.

April 5 7	San Diego FC	3–0	Seattle Sounders FC	San Diego, California
7:30 pm PDT	Tverskov 2'; Godoy 41'; Lozano 45+3'; Negri (yellow card) 60'; De la Torre (yellow card) 64'; Mighten (yellow card) 80'	Report	Leyva (yellow card) 68'	Stadium: Snapdragon Stadium; Attendance: 28,228; Referee: Malik Badawi

April 12 8	FC Dallas	0–1	Seattle Sounders FC	Frisco, Texas
5:30 pm PDT	Kaick (yellow card) 8'; Norris (yellow card) 28'; Acosta (yellow card) 63'; Show (yellow card) 64'	Report	Musovski 17', (yellow card) 25'; Leyva (yellow card) 66'	Stadium: Toyota Stadium; Attendance: 11,004; Referee: Filip Dujic

April 19 9	Seattle Sounders FC	3–0	Nashville SC	Seattle, Washington
4:30 pm PDT	Musovski 19'; De la Vega 30'; Rothrock 34'; Vargas (yellow card) 37'; Kossa-Rienzi (yellow card) 51'; Kim (yellow card) 56'; João Paulo (yellow card) 82'	Report		Stadium: Lumen Field; Attendance: 31,867; Referee: Ricardo Fierro

April 26 10	Colorado Rapids	1–1	Seattle Sounders FC	Commerce City, Colorado
6:30 pm PDT	Travis (yellow card) 38'; Mihailovic 54'; Larraz (yellow card) 83'	Report	Musovski (yellow card) 20', (goal) 45'; Yeimar (yellow card) 69'	Stadium: Dick's Sporting Goods Park; Attendance: 16,312; Referee: Alexis Da Silva

May 3 11	Seattle Sounders FC	4–1	St. Louis City SC	Seattle, Washington
7:30 pm PDT	A. Roldán (yellow card) 29'; Rusnák 33' (pen.); Vargas (yellow card) 35', (goal) 61'; Rothrock (yellow card) 43'; Musovski 81'; Nouhou 90+1'	Report	Hartel 29' (pen.); Teuchert (yellow card) 41'; Hiebert (yellow card) 66'	Stadium: Lumen Field; Attendance: 31,236; Referee: Lorenzo Hernandez

May 10 12	Houston Dynamo FC	1–3	Seattle Sounders FC	Houston, Texas
5:30 pm PDT	Raines (yellow card) 10'; Awodesu 32', (red card) 38'; Artur (yellow card) 37'	Report	Musovski 22', (yellow card) 45'; Yeimar (yellow card) 34'; Kim (yellow card) 45+10'; Rusnák 46', 58'; De Rosario (yellow card) 84'	Stadium: Shell Energy Stadium; Attendance: 19,802; Referee: Victor Rivas

May 14 13	Los Angeles FC	4–0	Seattle Sounders FC	Los Angeles, California
7:30 pm PDT	Tillman (yellow card) 12'; Ünder 26'; Smolyakov (yellow card) 45+3'; Ebobisse 51'; Bouanga 80'; Yeboah 86'	Report	Nouhou (yellow card) 34'; De Rosario (yellow card) 56'; João Paulo (yellow card) 84'	Stadium: BMO Stadium; Attendance: 22,120; Referee: Pierre-Luc Lauzière

May 17 14 (CC)	Portland Timbers	1–1	Seattle Sounders FC	Portland, Oregon
6:30 pm PDT	Ayala (yellow card) 23'; K. Miller (yellow card) 34'; Moreno 36'	Report	Rusnák 30'; Nouhou (yellow card) 50'	Stadium: Providence Park; Attendance: 25,218; Referee: Rosendo Mendoza

May 24 15	Seattle Sounders FC	1–0	FC Dallas	Seattle, Washington
12:00 pm PDT	Rusnák 86' (pen.), (yellow card) 87'	Report	Ramiro (yellow card) 10'; Abubakar (yellow card) 44'; Musa (yellow card) 85'; Kaick (yellow card) 90+5'; Urhoghide (yellow card) 90+5'	Stadium: Lumen Field; Attendance: 30,575; Referee: Allen Chapman

May 28 16	Seattle Sounders FC	1–0	San Diego FC	Seattle, Washington
5:30 pm PDT	Rothrock (yellow card) 27'; Ferreira 58'; Kossa-Rienzi (yellow card) 84'	Report	Verhoeven (yellow card) 81'	Stadium: Lumen Field; Attendance: 30,041; Referee: Ismir Pekmic

June 1 17	Seattle Sounders FC	2–3	Minnesota United FC	Seattle, Washington
3:00 pm PDT	Kossa-Rienzi 55'; Romero 83' (o.g.); Musovski (yellow card) 90+1'	Report	Gressel (yellow card) 19'; Pereyra (yellow card) 40'; Oluwaseyi 51', 58'; Lod 54' (pen.), (yellow card) 90+6'; Markanich (yellow card) 69'	Stadium: Lumen Field; Attendance: 31,491; Referee: Lukasz Szpala

June 8 18 (CC)	Vancouver Whitecaps FC	3–0	Seattle Sounders FC	Vancouver, British Columbia
6:00 pm PDT	Badwal 40'; Rios 70'; Kreilach 88' (pen.)	Report	Nouhou (red card) 52'; Bell (red card) 55'	Stadium: BC Place; Attendance: 24,276; Referee: Ricardo Fierro

June 28 19	Seattle Sounders FC	2–0	Austin FC	Seattle, Washington
7:30 pm PDT	Ferreira 45+2'; Musovski 54'; Baker-Whiting (yellow card) 76' (yellow-red card) 89'; João Paulo (yellow card) 90+2'	Report	Šabović (yellow card) 53'; Svatok (yellow card) 57'; Biro (yellow card) 74'	Stadium: Lumen Field; Attendance: 30,101; Referee: Tim Ford

July 6 20	Seattle Sounders FC	1–1	Columbus Crew	Seattle, Washington
2:00 pm PDT	Rothrock 43'; Ragen (yellow card) 46'; C. Roldan (yellow card) 71'; Kossa-Rienzi (yellow card) 87' (yellow-red card) 90+2'	Report	Rossi 27', (yellow card) 90+6'; Farsi (yellow card) 78'; Moreira (yellow card) 85'	Stadium: Lumen Field; Attendance: 30,552; Referee: Ismir Pekmic

July 12 21	Sporting Kansas City	2–3	Seattle Sounders FC	Kansas City, Kansas
5:30 pm PDT	Suleymanov (yellow card) 36'; Joveljić 67' (pen.); García (yellow card) 78'; Muñóz 90+6' (pen.)	Report	Morris 15'; Rusnák 27' (pen.), (yellow card) 82'; Bell (yellow card) 40'; C. Roldan (yellow card) 45+6'; Ferreira 45+8'; Vargas (yellow card) 81'; Nouhou (red card) 90+4'	Stadium: Children's Mercy Park; Attendance: 16,717; Referee: Elijio Arreguin

July 16 22	Seattle Sounders FC	3–3	Colorado Rapids	Seattle, Washington
6:30 pm PDT	Vargas 16'; Rusnák 43', 47'; C. Roldan (yellow card) 72'; Ferreira (yellow card) 72'; Kim (yellow card) 83'; Ragen (yellow card) 83'	Report	Ronan (yellow card) 31'; Mihailovic 50' (pen.); C. Bassett 53' (pen.); Yapi 75', (yellow card) 80'; Maxsø (yellow card) 76'; Awaziem (yellow card) 90+2'; Larraz (yellow card) 90+6'	Stadium: Lumen Field; Attendance: 30,049; Referee: Lorenzo Hernandez

July 19 23 (HC)	Seattle Sounders FC	3–2	San Jose Earthquakes	Seattle, Washington
5:30 pm PDT	Musovski 28', 54'; De la Vega 69'; Baker-Whiting (yellow card) 90+3'	Report	Judd 26'; Arango 64'; Espinoza (yellow card) 88'; Leroux (yellow card) 90'; Roberts (yellow card) 90+8'	Stadium: Lumen Field; Attendance: 30,129; Referee: Drew Fischer

July 26 24	Atlanta United FC	2–2	Seattle Sounders FC	Atlanta, Georgia
4:30 pm PDT	Gregersen (yellow card) 5'; Yeimar 7' (o.g.); Muyumba (yellow card) 73'; Miranchuk 90+9'	Report	De la Vega 54'; Baker-Whiting (yellow card) 72'; Ragen (yellow card) 88'; De Rosario 90+5'	Stadium: Mercedes-Benz Stadium; Attendance: 40,409; Referee: Ramy Touchan

August 10 25	LA Galaxy	0–4	Seattle Sounders FC	Carson, California
7:00 pm PDT		Report	Aude 25' (o.g.); Musovski 37', 54'; Brunell 85'	Stadium: Dignity Health Sports Park; Attendance: 18,748; Referee: Allen Chapman

August 16 26	Minnesota United FC	1–0	Seattle Sounders FC	Saint Paul, Minnesota
5:30 pm PDT	Romero (yellow card) 24'; Pereyra 73', (yellow card) 81'	Report	Yeimar (yellow card) 57'	Stadium: Allianz Field; Attendance: 19,432; Referee: Malik Badawi

August 24 27	Seattle Sounders FC	5–2	Sporting Kansas City	Seattle, Washington
6:00 pm PDT	Kossa-Rienzi 11'; Musovski 45+1', 50', 75' (pen.); Brunell 61'	Report	Toye 36'; Baker 53' (o.g.); Afrifa (yellow card) 85'	Stadium: Lumen Field; Attendance: 30,184; Referee: Chris Penso

September 13 28	Seattle Sounders FC	2–2	LA Galaxy	Seattle, Washington
5:30 pm PDT	Ferreira 5'; Ragen (yellow card) 6'; Baker-Whiting (yellow card) 36'; Musovski 41'	Report	Yoshida 44'; Yamane 87'	Stadium: Lumen Field; Attendance: 31,952; Referee: Rosendo Mendoza

September 16 29	Inter Miami CF	3–1	Seattle Sounders FC	Fort Lauderdale, Florida
4:30 pm PDT	Alba 12', (yellow card) 78'; Messi 41'; Fray 52'; Silvetti (yellow card) 83'	Report	Vargas 69'	Stadium: Chase Stadium; Attendance: 19,934; Referee: Guido Gonzales Jr.

September 21 30	Austin FC	2–1	Seattle Sounders FC	Austin, Texas
5:30 pm PDT	Rubio 42'; Uzuni 90+6'	Report	Musovski (yellow card) 2'; Rothrock (yellow card) 28'; Minoungou 46'; Ferreira (yellow card) 90+2'	Stadium: Q2 Stadium; Attendance: 20,738; Referee: Jair Marrufo
Note: Match originally scheduled for September 20.

September 27 31 (CC)	Seattle Sounders FC	2–2	Vancouver Whitecaps FC	Seattle, Washington
7:30 pm PDT	Rothrock (yellow card) 40'; Nouhou (yellow card) 45+2'; Ragen 54'; Rusnák 55'	Report	Laborda (yellow card) 4', (goal) 69'; White 52'	Stadium: Lumen Field; Attendance: 32,750; Referee: Malik Badawi

October 4 32 (CC)	Seattle Sounders FC	1–0	Portland Timbers	Seattle, Washington
7:30 pm PDT	De la Vega 16'; Rusnák (red card) 90+6'	Report	Smith (yellow card) 78'	Stadium: Lumen Field; Attendance: 32,913; Referee: Rubiel Vazquez

October 11 33	Seattle Sounders FC	1–0	Real Salt Lake	Seattle, Washington
6:30 pm PDT	Rothrock 4'; Musovski (yellow card) 88'	Report	Vera (yellow card) 13'; Cruz (yellow card) 30'; Glad (yellow card) 55'; Katranis (yellow card) 71'	Stadium: Lumen Field; Attendance: 31,587; Referee: Ricardo Montero
Note: Originally scheduled for August 30, but moved due to Seattle Sounders FC's participation in the 2025 Leagues Cup final.

October 18 34	New York City FC	1–2	Seattle Sounders FC	New York City, New York
3:00 pm PDT	O'Toole (yellow card) 45+2'; Haak (yellow card) 45+4'; Freese (yellow card) 45+8'; Fernández 82'	Report	Morris 61'; Rusnák (yellow card) 64'; Ragen 87'	Stadium: Citi Field; Attendance: 24,832; Referee: Chris Penso

=== MLS Cup Playoffs ===
==== Round One ====
October 27 Round One	Minnesota United FC	0–0 (3–2 p)	Seattle Sounders FC	Saint Paul, Minnesota
6:00 pm PDT	St. Clair (yellow card) 10'; Hlongwane (yellow card) 30'; Boxall (yellow card) 65'; Triantis (yellow card) 83'; Pereyra (yellow card) 90+3'	Report		Stadium: Allianz Field; Attendance: 16,945; Referee: Alexis Da Silva
	Penalties
	Yeboah (penalty scored); Triantis (penalty scored); Pereyra (penalty scored); Gressel (penalty missed)		(penalty scored) Rusnák; (penalty missed) Á. Roldán; (penalty scored) Ragen; (penalty missed) C. Roldan; (penalty missed) Leyva

November 3 Round One	Seattle Sounders FC	4–2	Minnesota United FC	Seattle, Washington
7:45 pm PST	Vargas 8', 86', (yellow card) 29'; Morris 21'; Musovski 41'	Report	Romero (yellow card) 25'; Triantis 45+1'; Lod 45+5'; Duggan (yellow card) 90+5'	Stadium: Lumen Field; Attendance: 30,085; Referee: Pierre-Luc Lauzière

November 8 Round One	Minnesota United FC	3–3 (7–6 p)	Seattle Sounders FC	Saint Paul, Minnesota
1:00 pm PST	Pereyra 19', (yellow card) 26'; Rosales (red card) 41'; Boxall (yellow card) 45+6'; Díaz 62', (yellow card) 67'; Markanich 71'; St. Clair (yellow card) 90'	Report	Rusnák 5'; Musovski 8'; Yeimar (yellow card) 18'; Morris 88'	Stadium: Allianz Field; Attendance: 18,645; Referee: Victor Rivas
	Penalties
	Pereyra (penalty missed); Triantis (penalty scored); Gene (penalty scored); Duggan (penalty scored); Boxall (penalty scored); Harvey (penalty scored); Markanich (penalty missed); Dotson (penalty missed); Hlongwane (penalty scored); St. Clair (penalty scored)		(penalty scored) Rusnák; (penalty missed) Morris; (penalty scored) Ragen; (penalty scored) Kent; (penalty scored) Rothrock; (penalty scored) Minoungou; (penalty missed) Vargas; (penalty missed) De Rosario; (penalty scored) Á. Roldán; (penalty missed) Thomas

Minnesota United FC win the series 2–1.

=== CONCACAF Champions Cup ===
The Sounders played in the CONCACAF Champions Cup, the regional club championship for North America, Central America, and the Caribbean, for the eighth season since entering MLS. The team qualified for the tournament based on the 2024 MLS Supporters' Shield standings using a seed vacated by the LA Galaxy after they won MLS Cup 2024. The Sounders were placed into Pot 1 as one of the top eight clubs in the CONCACAF Club Rankings for the round one draw.

==== Round one ====
February 19 First leg	Antigua (Guatemala)	1–3	(United States) Seattle Sounders FC	Antigua, Guatemala
5:00 pm PST	Santis 24', (yellow card) 81'; Gálvez (yellow card) 35'; Hernández (yellow card) 10'	Report	Arriola 3'; De la Vega 61'; Nouhou (yellow card) 90+1'; Rusnák 90+5'	Stadium: Estadio Pensativo; Attendance: 2,200; Referee: Katia García (Mexico)

February 26 Second leg	Seattle Sounders FC (United States)	3–1	(Guatemala) Antigua	Seattle, Washington
7:30 pm PST	De la Vega 24', 88'; Arriola 53'; Musovski (yellow card) 68'	Report	Gálvez 45+2'; Morán (yellow card) 58'; Rosales (yellow card) 65'; Bradley (yellow card) 66'; Fernández (yellow card) 81'	Stadium: Lumen Field; Attendance: 24,714; Referee: Selvin Brown (Honduras)

==== Round of 16 ====
March 5 First leg	Seattle Sounders FC (United States)	0–0	(Mexico) Cruz Azul	Seattle, Washington
7:30 pm PST	Rusnák (yellow card) 40'	Report	Fernández (yellow card) 45+3'; Faravelli (yellow card) 90+1'	Stadium: Lumen Field; Attendance: 27,844; Referee: Julio Luna (Guatemala)

March 11 Second leg	Cruz Azul (Mexico)	4–1 (4–1 agg.)	(United States) Seattle Sounders FC	Mexico City, Mexico
4:30 pm PDT	C. Rodríguez 33', (yellow card) 45+4'; Rotondi (yellow card) 38'; Sepúlveda 71' (pen.); Bogusz (yellow card) 80'; Romero 85'; Sánchez 88'	Report	Vargas (yellow card) 50'; Musovski 75'	Stadium: Estadio Olímpico Universitario; Attendance: 7,473; Referee: Oshane Nation (Jamaica)

=== FIFA Club World Cup ===
The Sounders played in the 2025 FIFA Club World Cup, the first edition of the expanded worldwide club competition, having qualified as winners of the 2022 CONCACAF Champions League. They hosted their group stage matches at Lumen Field in Seattle.

==== Group stage (Group B) ====
The draw for the group stage was held on December 5, 2024. Seattle Sounders FC was placed in pot 4, but automatically assigned to Group B for scheduling purposes.

Pos	Team	Pld	W	D	L	GF	GA	GD	Pts	Qualification
1	(France) Paris Saint-Germain	3	2	0	1	6	1	+5	6 (Note: Tied on head-to-head points (3). Head-to-head goal difference: Paris Saint-Germain +3, Botafogo 0, Atlético Madrid –3.)	Advance to knockout stage
2	(Brazil) Botafogo	3	2	0	1	3	2	+1	6	Advance to knockout stage
3	(Spain) Atlético Madrid	3	2	0	1	4	5	−1	6	
4	(United States) Seattle Sounders FC	3	0	0	3	2	7	−5	0	

Source: FIFA
Rules for classification: Group stage tiebreakers
Notes:

June 15	Botafogo (Brazil)	2–1	(United States) Seattle Sounders FC	Seattle, Washington
7:00 pm PDT	Cunha 28'; Igor Jesus 44'; Barboza (yellow card) 61'; Correa (yellow card) 64'	Report	Nouhou (yellow card) 36'; C. Roldan 75'; Ragen (yellow card) 87'	Stadium: Lumen Field; Attendance: 30,151; Referee: Glenn Nyberg (Sweden)

June 19	Seattle Sounders FC (United States)	1–3	(Spain) Atlético Madrid	Seattle, Washington
3:00 pm PDT	Rusnák 50'; Rothrock (yellow card) 63'	Report	Barrios 11', 55'; De Paul (yellow card) 42'; Witsel 47'; Gallagher (yellow card) 77'	Stadium: Lumen Field; Attendance: 51,636; Referee: Yael Falcón (Argentina)

June 23	Seattle Sounders FC (United States)	0–2	(France) Paris Saint-Germain	Seattle, Washington
12:00 pm PDT		Report	Kvaratskhelia 35'; Neves (yellow card) 44'; Hakimi 66'	Stadium: Lumen Field; Attendance: 50,628; Referee: Cristián Garay (Chile)

=== Leagues Cup ===
==== League phase ====
Pos	Team	Pld	W	PW	PL	L	GF	GA	GD	Pts	Qualification
1	Seattle Sounders FC	3	3	0	0	0	11	2	+9	9	Advance to knockout stage
2	Inter Miami CF	3	2	1	0	0	7	4	+3	8	Advance to knockout stage
3	LA Galaxy	3	2	0	1	0	10	3	+7	7	Advance to knockout stage
4	Orlando City SC	3	2	0	1	0	9	3	+6	7	Advance to knockout stage
5	Portland Timbers	3	2	0	1	0	6	1	+5	7	

Source: Leagues Cup

The 2025 Leagues Cup, which ran concurrently with the regular season from July 29 to August 31, included 18 teams from MLS and 18 teams from Liga MX in a modified format from the previous edition, which had included all MLS teams. The top nine MLS teams in each conference based on the 2024 regular season standings qualified for the tournament. The Sounders were placed in the second tier of the Western group and played against three Liga MX opponents in the first phase.

July 31 1	Cruz Azul (Mexico)	0–7	(United States) Seattle Sounders FC	Seattle, Washington
7:30 pm PDT	Ditta (yellow card) 32'; Rivero (yellow card) 41'; Paradela (yellow card) 64'	Report	Musovski (yellow card) 32'; Yeimar 48'; Vargas 50'; Ferreira 58'; De Rosario 69', (yellow card) 71'; De la Vega 76', 90+1'; Nouhou 88'	Stadium: Lumen Field; Attendance: 22,697; Referee: Víctor Cáceres (Mexico)

August 3 2	Seattle Sounders FC (United States)	2–1	(Mexico) Santos Laguna	Seattle, Washington
7:30 pm PDT	Ortega 8' (o.g.); Minoungou (yellow card) 65' (yellow-red card) 74', (goal) 72'	Report	Ortega (yellow card) 20'; Lozano (yellow card) 82'; Palacios (yellow card) 88'; Dájome 90+6'	Stadium: Lumen Field; Attendance: 17,265; Referee: Steffon Dewar (Jamaica)

August 6 3	Seattle Sounders FC (United States)	2–1	(Mexico) Tijuana	Seattle, Washington
8:00 pm PDT	Kossa-Rienzi (yellow card) 45+7'; De Rosario 56'; A. Roldán (yellow card) 72'; Musovski 87'	Report	Blanco (yellow card) 37'; Castañeda 45+4'; Mejía (yellow card) 77'; Reyes (yellow card) 83'; Vega (yellow card) 85'; Gómez (yellow card) 87'; Franco (red card) 90+4'	Stadium: Lumen Field; Attendance: 17,949; Referee: Katja Koroleva (United States)

==== Knockout stage ====
August 20 Quarterfinals	Seattle Sounders FC (United States)	0–0 (4–3 p)	(Mexico) Puebla	Seattle, Washington
8:00 pm PDT	Musovski (yellow card) 76' (yellow-red card) 76'	Report	Organista (yellow card) 69'; Díaz (yellow card) 84'; Marín (yellow card) 90+4'	Stadium: Lumen Field; Attendance: 18,362; Referee: Juan Gabriel Calderón (Costa Rica)
	Penalties
	C. Roldan (penalty missed); A. Roldán (penalty scored); Ragen (penalty scored); Ferreira (penalty scored); Vargas (penalty scored)		(penalty missed) Marín; (penalty scored) Lozano; (penalty scored) Organista; (penalty scored) Monárrez; (penalty missed) Díaz

August 27 Semifinals	LA Galaxy (United States)	0−2	(United States) Seattle Sounders FC	Carson, California
7:45 pm PDT	Fagúndez (yellow card) 16'; Cuevas (yellow card) 20'; Aude (yellow card) 35'; Gabriel Pec (yellow card) 62'; Yoshida (yellow card) 75'	Report	De la Vega 7'; Rothrock (yellow card) 35'; De Rosario 57'; C. Roldán (yellow card) 67'; Nouhou (red card) 80'	Stadium: Dignity Health Sports Park; Attendance: 16,255; Referee: Adonai Escobedo (Mexico)

August 31 Final	Seattle Sounders FC (United States)	3–0	(United States) Inter Miami CF	Seattle, Washington
5:00 pm PDT	De Rosario 26'; A. Roldán 84' (pen.); Rothrock 89'	Report	Busquets (yellow card) 69'; Bright (yellow card) 82'	Stadium: Lumen Field; Attendance: 69,314; Referee: Juan Gabriel Calderón (Costa Rica)

== Players ==
For the 2025 season, the Sounders were permitted a maximum of 30 signed players on the first team, of which 10 roster positions were designated for supplemental and reserve players. Additional homegrown players are eligible to be signed to off-roster slots and are able to appear in MLS matches through short-term agreements. The senior players in the first 20 roster positions count towards a base salary cap of $5.95 million with exceptions for certain categories, including up to three Designated Players, who counted for a set amount in the cap. The Sounders chose the Designated Player model for roster construction and have three unused under-22 initiative slots.

The Sounders had $4.2 million in available general allocation money during the winter transfer window that could be used for trades or contract modifications. By May, the team had $1.15 million in remaining general allocation money.

=== Roster ===
As of September 8, 2025

Note: Flags indicate national team as defined under FIFA eligibility rules. Players may hold more than one non-FIFA nationality. Squad includes all players who had first team contracts or appearances during the 2025 season across all competitions. Ages listed for each player is calculated from February 22, 2025, the first matchday of the MLS regular season.

Seattle Sounders FC first team roster
No.	Name	Nationality	Position	Age	Signed	Contract ends	Previous club	Notes
5	Nouhou Tolo	Cameroon	DF	27	2017	2025	Seattle Sounders FC 2 (USA)	
6	João Paulo	Brazil	MF	33	2020	2025	Botafogo (BRA)	
7	Cristian Roldan	United States	MF	29	2015	2027	Washington Huskies (USA)	
9	Jesús Ferreira	United States	FW	24	2025	2027	FC Dallas (USA)	
10	Pedro de la Vega	Argentina	MF	24	2024	2027	Lanús (ARG)	Young DP; International
11	Albert Rusnák	Slovakia	MF	30	2022	2026	Real Salt Lake (USA)	DP
13	Jordan Morris	United States	FW	30	2016	2027	Stanford Cardinal (USA)	DP; HGP
14	Paul Rothrock	United States	MF	26	2023	2025	Tacoma Defiance (USA)	
15	Jonathan Bell	Jamaica	DF	27	2024	2025	St. Louis City SC (USA)	
16	Alex Roldán	El Salvador	DF	28	2018	2026	Seattle Redhawks (USA)	
17	Paul Arriola	United States	MF	30	2025	2027	FC Dallas (USA)	
18	Obed Vargas	Mexico	MF	19	2021	2025	Tacoma Defiance (USA)	HGP
19	Danny Musovski	United States	FW	29	2024	2025	Real Salt Lake (USA)	
20	Kim Kee-hee	South Korea	DF	35	2025	2026	Ulsan Hyundai FC (KOR)	International
21	Reed Baker-Whiting	United States	MF	19	2021	2025	Tacoma Defiance (USA)	HGP
24	Stefan Frei (c)	Switzerland	GK	38	2014	2025	Toronto FC (CAN)	
25	Jackson Ragen	United States	DF	26	2022	2027	Tacoma Defiance (USA)	
26	Andrew Thomas	Russia	GK	26	2021	2027	Stanford Cardinal (USA)	
28	Yeimar Gómez Andrade	Colombia	DF	32	2020	2025	Unión de Santa Fe (ARG)	
29	Jacob Castro	United States	GK	25	2023	2025	San Diego State Aztecs (USA)	HGP
35	Antino Lopez	United States	DF	22	2025	2025	Tacoma Defiance (USA)	Short-term agreement
37	Snyder Brunell	United States	MF	17	2025	2028	Tacoma Defiance (USA)	HGP
39	Stuart Hawkins	United States	DF	18	2023	2026	Tacoma Defiance (USA)	HGP
41	Mohammed Shour	United States	GK	17	2025	2025	Tacoma Defiance (USA)	Short-term agreement
45	Peter Kingston	United States	MF	23	2025	2025	Tacoma Defiance (USA)	Short-term agreement
75	Danny Leyva	United States	MF	21	2019	2026	Tacoma Defiance (USA)	HGP
77	Ryan Kent	England	MF	28	2025	2025	Fenerbahçe SK (TUR)	
85	Kalani Kossa-Rienzi	United States	MF	22	2025	2025	Tacoma Defiance (USA)	Originally a short-term loan
93	Georgi Minoungou	Ivory Coast	MF	20	2024	2028	Tacoma Defiance (USA)	International
95	Osaze De Rosario	United States	FW	23	2025	2025	Tacoma Defiance (USA)	

==== On loan ====
As of September 8, 2025

Seattle Sounders FC players on loan
No.	Name	Nationality	Position	Age	Loan began	Loan ends	Loaned to	Notes
3	Travian Sousa	United States	DF	23	2025	2025	FC Tulsa (USA)	
4	Leo Burney	United States	DF	23	2025	2025	Tacoma Defiance (USA)	HGP
33	Cody Baker	United States	DF	21	2025	2025	Sacramento Republic FC (USA)	HGP

=== Appearances and goals ===
A total of 28 players made at least one appearance for the Sounders during the 2025 season across all competitions. Forward Jesús Ferreira and midfielder Paul Rothrock tied for the most appearances overall at 48 matches. Stefan Frei made the most appearances as goalkeeper at 35 matches. Danny Musovski was the team's leading goalscorer in 2025 with 18 goals across all competitions.

Player statistics (all competitions)
No.	Player	Nat.	Pos.	Regular season		Playoffs		Leagues Cup		Champions Cup		Club World Cup		Total		Discipline	
No.	Player	Nat.	Pos.	Apps	Goals	Apps	Goals	Apps	Goals	Apps	Goals	Apps	Goals	Apps	Goals	A yellow rectangle, denoting the yellow penalty card shown to a player being cautioned	A red rectangle, denoting the red penalty card shown to a player being sent off
3	Travian Sousa	(United States) USA	DF	0	0	0	0	0	0	0	0	0	0	0	0	0	0
4	Leo Burney	(United States) USA	DF	0	0	0	0	0	0	0	0	0	0	0	0	0	0
5	Nouhou Tolo	(Cameroon) CMR	DF	27	1	3	0	4	1	4	0	2	0	40	2	7	3
6	João Paulo	(Brazil) BRA	MF	11	0	0	0	0	0	2	0	1	0	14	0	2	0
7	Cristian Roldan	(United States) USA	MF	31	1	3	0	6	0	3	0	3	1	46	2	4	0
9	Jesús Ferreira	(United States) USA	FW	32	4	3	0	6	1	4	0	3	0	48	5	3	0
10	Pedro de la Vega	(Argentina) ARG	MF	26	4	0	0	6	3	3	3	2	0	37	10	0	0
11	Albert Rusnák	(Slovakia) SVK	MF	29	11	3	1	3	0	3	1	3	1	41	14	4	1
13	Jordan Morris	(United States) USA	FW	17	5	3	2	0	0	4	0	1	0	25	7	0	0
14	Paul Rothrock	(United States) USA	MF	33	4	3	0	5	1	4	0	3	0	48	5	6	0
15	Jonathan Bell	(Jamaica) JAM	DF	21	0	0	0	0	0	1	0	3	0	25	0	1	1
16	Alex Roldán	(El Salvador) ESA	DF	29	0	3	0	6	1	4	0	3	0	45	1	3	0
17	Paul Arriola	(United States) USA	MF	2	0	0	0	0	0	4	2	0	0	6	2	0	0
18	Obed Vargas	(Mexico) MEX	MF	26	3	3	2	6	1	3	0	3	0	42	6	6	0
19	Danny Musovski	(United States) USA	FW	31	14	3	2	4	1	3	1	3	0	44	18	8	1
20	Kim Kee-hee	(South Korea) KOR	DF	15	0	0	0	5	0	0	0	1	0	21	0	3	0
21	Reed Baker-Whiting	(United States) USA	MF	14	0	0	0	3	0	0	0	2	0	19	0	4	0
24	Stefan Frei	(Switzerland) SUI	GK	26	0	3	0	0	0	3	0	3	0	35	0	0	0
25	Jackson Ragen	(United States) USA	DF	24	2	3	0	6	0	4	0	3	0	40	2	8	0
26	Andrew Thomas	(Russia) RUS	GK	8	0	1	0	6	0	1	0	0	0	16	0	0	0
28	Yeimar Gómez Andrade	(Colombia) COL	DF	24	0	3	0	5	1	4	0	0	0	36	1	4	0
29	Jacob Castro	(United States) USA	GK	0	0	0	0	0	0	0	0	0	0	0	0	0	0
33	Cody Baker	(United States) USA	DF	3	0	0	0	0	0	0	0	0	0	3	0	0	0
35	Antino Lopez	(United States) USA	DF	0	0	0	0	0	0	0	0	0	0	0	0	0	0
37	Snyder Brunell	(United States) USA	MF	6	2	0	0	2	0	0	0	0	0	8	2	0	0
39	Stuart Hawkins	(United States) USA	DF	4	0	0	0	0	0	0	0	0	0	4	0	0	0
41	Mohammed Shour	(United States) USA	GK	0	0	0	0	0	0	0	0	0	0	0	0	0	0
45	Peter Kingston	(United States) USA	MF	1	0	0	0	0	0	0	0	0	0	1	0	0	0
75	Danny Leyva	(United States) USA	MF	16	0	2	0	5	0	2	0	1	0	26	0	3	0
77	Ryan Kent	(England) ENG	MF	15	0	1	0	2	0	0	0	3	0	21	0	0	0
85	Kalani Kossa-Rienzi	(United States) USA	MF	15	3	1	0	4	0	2	0	2	0	24	3	4	1
93	Georgi Minoungou	(Ivory Coast) CIV	MF	6	1	2	0	3	1	4	0	2	0	17	2	3	1
95	Osaze De Rosario	(Guyana) GUY	FW	12	1	2	0	6	4	0	0	1	0	21	5	3	0

== Coaching staff ==
As of January 2025

Technical staff
Head coach	Brian Schmetzer (USA)
Assistant coach	Preki (USA)
Director of goalkeeping	Tom Dutra (USA)
Assistant coach	Freddy Juarez (USA)
Assistant coach	Andy Rose (ENG)

== Transfers ==
The MLS season has two normal transfer windows during which teams can register new players from outside of the league and those who required an International Transfer Certificate. The primary window was open from January 31 to April 23, while a secondary window ran from July 24 to August 21. All participants in the FIFA Club World Cup, including the Sounders, were granted an additional window by FIFA in early June to register new players. Teams were required to have their rosters compliant with league rules by February 21 and were unable to make changes beyond the roster freeze on September 12. Between the transfer windows, teams were allowed to sign free agents or other U.S.-based players, including those traded between MLS teams for other players, general allocation money, or various league slots.

For transfers in, dates listed are when Seattle Sounders FC officially signed the player to the roster. Transactions where only the rights to the players were acquired are not listed. For transfers out, dates listed are when Seattle Sounders FC officially removed the players from its roster, not when they signed with another club. If a player later signed with another club, his new club was noted, but the date listed here remains the one when he was officially removed from the Seattle Sounders FC roster.

=== In ===
Incoming transfers for Seattle Sounders FC
Player	No.	Pos.	Previous team	Notes	Date	Ref.
Leo Burney (USA)	4	DF	Pennsylvania Quakers (USA)	Homegrown Player	December 11, 2024	
Travian Sousa (USA)	3	DF	Tacoma Defiance (USA)		December 11, 2024	
Jesús Ferreira (USA)	9	FW	FC Dallas (USA)	Traded for Léo Chú, an international roster slot, $1 million in 2025 general allocation money, $500,000 in 2026 general allocation money, and up to $800,000 in allocation money	January 8, 2025	
Paul Arriola (USA)	17	MF	FC Dallas (USA)	Traded for 2026 MLS SuperDraft first-round pick and up to $300,000 in general allocation money	January 8, 2025	
Kim Kee-hee (KOR)	20	DF	Ulsan HD FC (KOR)	One-year contract with option for 2026	January 28, 2025	
Kalani Kossa-Rienzi (USA)	85	DF	Tacoma Defiance (USA)	One-year contract with options for 2026 and 2027; originally a short-term loan agreement in February	March 10, 2025	
Ryan Kent (ENG)	77	MF	Fenerbahçe SK (TUR)	One-year contract with option for 2026	March 31, 2025	
Osaze De Rosario (GUY)	95	FW	Tacoma Defiance (USA)	One-year contract with options for 2026 and 2027	May 8, 2025	
Snyder Brunell (USA)	37	MF	Tacoma Defiance (USA)	Four-year contract with club option for 2029	July 29, 2025	
Mohammed Shour (USA)	41	GK	Tacoma Defiance (USA)	Short-term agreement	August 3, 2025	
Sebastian Gomez (USA)	90	MF	Tacoma Defiance (USA)	Short-term agreement under "extreme hardship" rule	October 12, 2025	
Peter Kingston (USA)	45	MF	Tacoma Defiance (USA)	Short-term agreement under "extreme hardship" rule	October 12, 2025	
Antino Lopez (USA)	35	DF	Tacoma Defiance (USA)	Short-term agreement under "extreme hardship" rule	October 12, 2025	

=== Out ===
Outgoing transfers for Seattle Sounders FC
Player	No.	Pos.	New team	Notes	Date	Ref.
Sota Kitahara (USA)	77	MF		Option declined	December 4, 2024	
Nathan (BRA)	4	DF	Cuiabá (BRA)	Option declined	December 4, 2024	
Raúl Ruidíaz (PER)	9	FW	Atlético Grau (PER)	Out of contract	December 4, 2024	
Dylan Teves (USA)	99	FW	Washington Athletic Club (USA)	Option declined	December 4, 2024	
Léo Chú (BRA)	23	FW	FC Dallas (USA)	Traded to FC Dallas for Jesús Ferreira, an international roster slot, and general allocation money	January 8, 2025	
Braudílio Rodrigues (POR)	27	MF	Lexington SC (USA)	Waived	January 22, 2025	
Josh Atencio (USA)	8	MF	Colorado Rapids (USA)	Traded for $650,000 in 2025 general allocation money, $650,000 in 2026 general allocation money, and $300,000 in additional general allocation money based on performance.	February 15, 2025	
Cody Baker (USA)	33	DF	Sacramento Republic FC (USA)	On loan until the end of the USL Championship season	September 8, 2025	
Travian Sousa (USA)	3	DF	FC Tulsa (USA)	On loan until the end of the USL Championship season	September 8, 2025	

=== Draft picks ===
Draft picks were not automatically signed to the team roster. Only those who are signed to a contract were listed as transfers in. Only trades involving draft picks and executed after the start of the 2025 MLS SuperDraft are listed in the notes.

2025 MLS SuperDraft picks for Seattle Sounders FC
Player	Nationality	Round	Pick	Pos.	Previous team
Ryan Baer	United States	1st	28	MF	West Virginia Mountineers (USA)
Demian Alvarez	United States	2nd	58	DF	Seattle Redhawks (USA)
Trace Terry	United States	3rd	76	FW	Bowling Green Falcons (USA)

=== Other transactions ===
- On December 12, 2024, Seattle Sounders FC sold two international roster slots to San Diego FC for $250,000 in 2025 general allocation money.
- On December 20, 2024, Seattle Sounders FC sold two international roster slots to the New York Red Bulls for $300,000 in 2025 general allocation money and $50,000 in 2026 general allocation money.
- On February 19, 2025, Seattle Sounders FC transferred their discovery rights for Matheus Nascimento to the LA Galaxy for $50,000 in general allocation money and an additional $150,000 in 2026 general allocation money if the Galaxy sign him to a permanent contract.

== Player awards ==
The Sounders announced their team awards, as decided through a vote of the players, at the end of the regular season. Cristian Roldan won the most valuable player award for the second time; Jackson Ragen was named defender of the year; Danny Musovski won the golden boot with 17 goals across all competitions prior to the playoffs; and Stefan Frei was named humanitarian of the year for the sixth season for his work with the Seattle Children's Hospital and the nonprofit organization Kick Childhood Cancer.

=== MLS Best XI ===
Player	No.	Position	Ref.
Cristian Roldan	1st	Midfielder	

=== MLS All-Star Game ===
Player	No.	Position	Ref.
Obed Vargas	1st	Midfielder	

=== MLS Player of the Matchday ===
Week	Player	Position	Opponent	Ref.
30	Danny Musovski	Forward	Sporting Kansas City	

=== MLS Team of the Matchday ===
Week	Player(s)	Opponent(s)	Ref.
1	Bench: Jordan Morris	Charlotte FC	
3	XI: Albert Rusnák; Bench: Kalani Kossa-Rienzi, Paul Rothrock; Coach: Brian Schmetzer	Los Angeles FC	
6	Bench: Albert Rusnák	San Jose Earthquakes	
8	Bench: Obed Vargas	FC Dallas	
9	Bench: Yeimar Gómez Andrade, Jesús Ferreira	Nashville SC	
11	XI: Nouhou Tolo; Bench: Obed Vargas, Ryan Kent	St. Louis City SC	
12	XI: Albert Rusnák	Houston Dynamo FC	
14	Bench: Albert Rusnák	Portland Timbers	
15	Bench: Albert Rusnák	FC Dallas	
16	XI: Stefan Frei; Bench: Jesús Ferreira	San Diego FC	
21	XI: Jesús Ferreira	Austin FC	
24	Bench: Albert Rusnák	Sporting Kansas City	
25	XI: Albert Rusnák	Colorado Rapids	
26	XI: Danny Musovski; Bench: Pedro de la Vega	San Jose Earthquakes	
28	XI: Danny Musovski; Bench: Alex Roldán	LA Galaxy	
30	XI: Danny Musovski; Bench: Danny Leyva	Sporting Kansas City	
33	Bench: Danny Musovski	LA Galaxy	
37	Bench: Albert Rusnák	Vancouver Whitecaps FC	
38	Bench: Pedro de la Vega	Portland Timbers	
39	XI: Jackson Ragen	New York City FC	

=== Leagues Cup ===
Player	Award
Pedro de la Vega	Best Player
Andrew Thomas	Best Goalkeeper
