= 2025 FIFA Club World Cup Group B =

Soccer tournament group stage

Group B stadiums

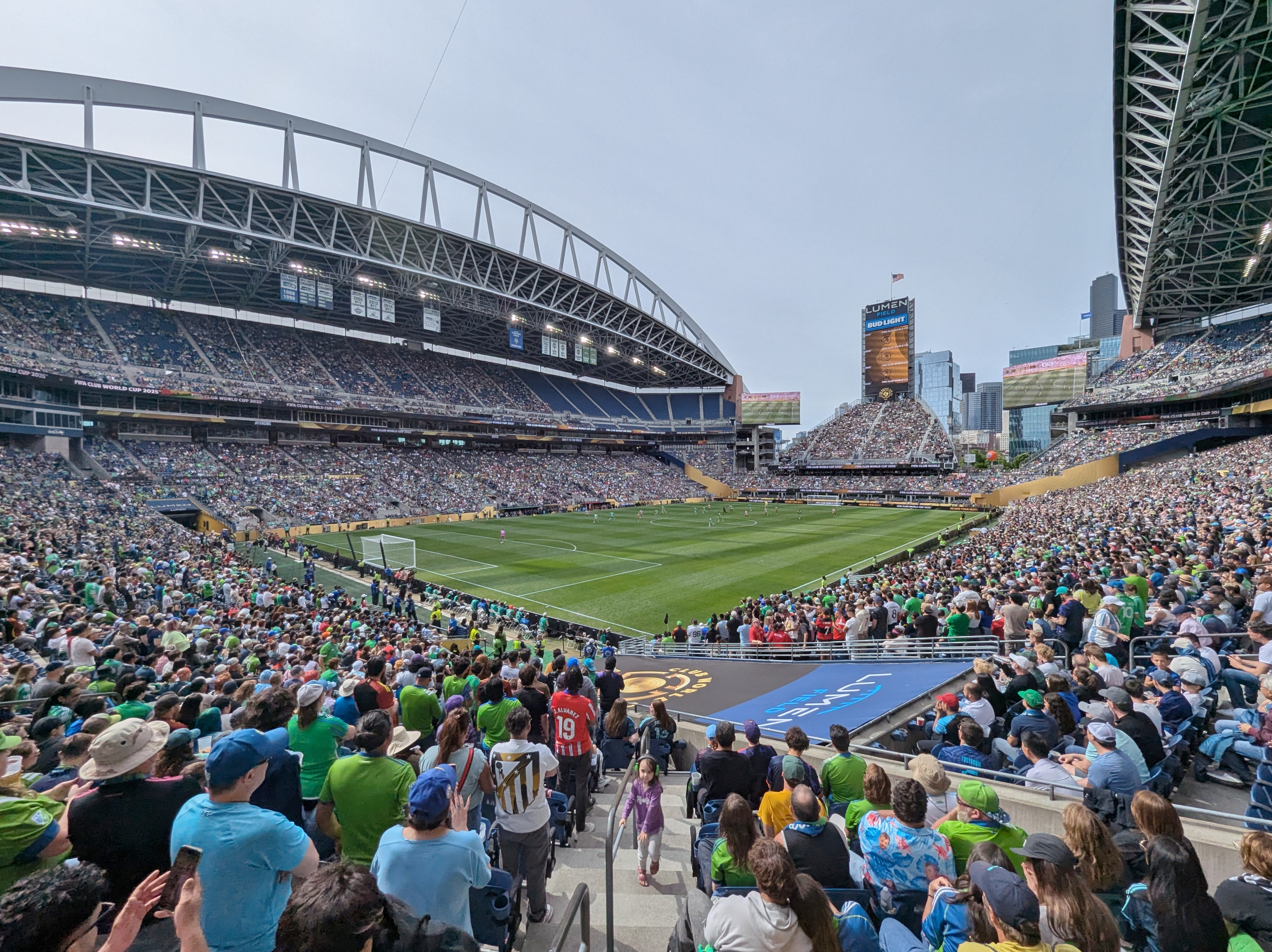
Lumen Field in Seattle, Washington

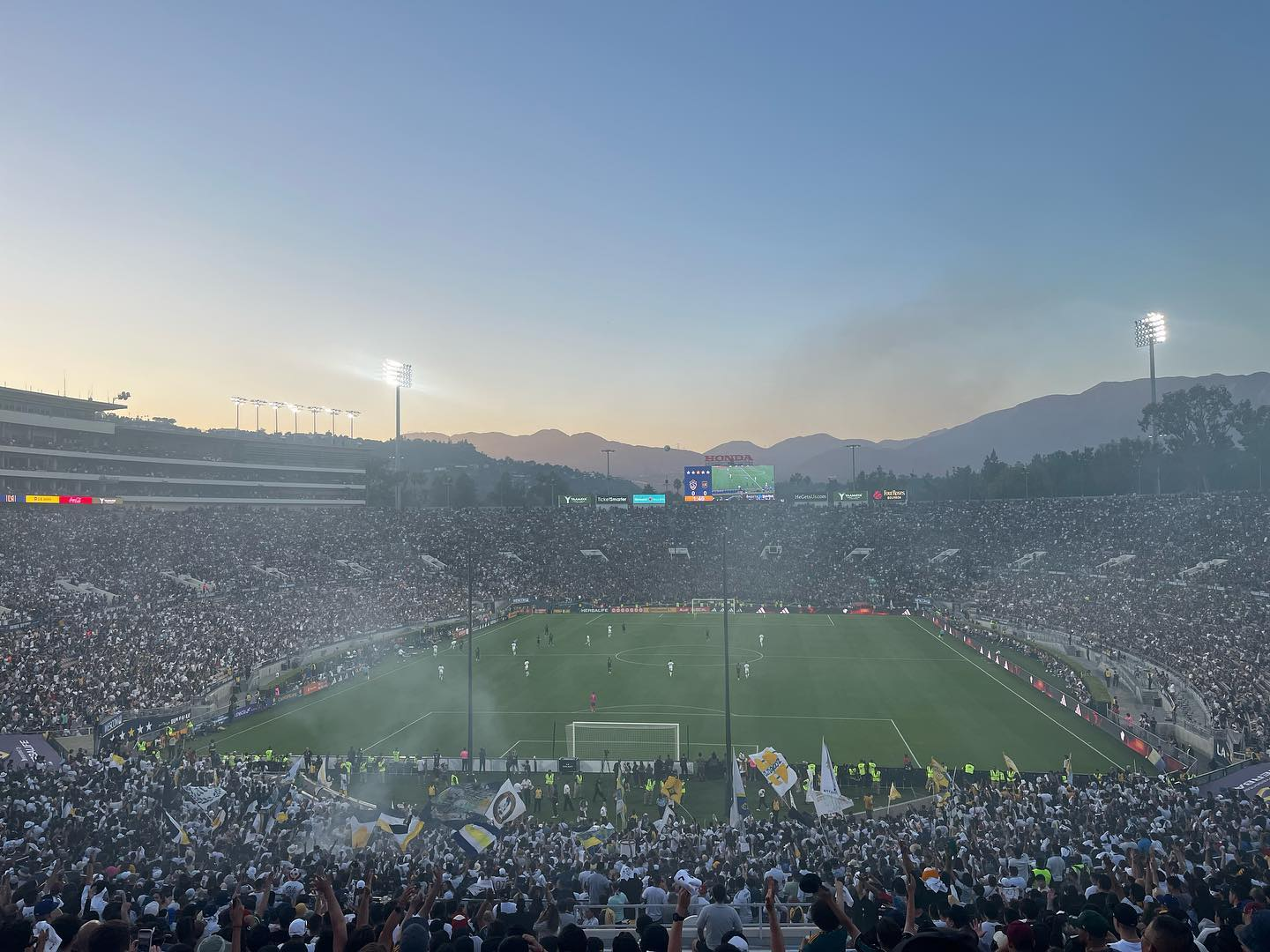
The Rose Bowl in Pasadena, California

Group B was one of eight groups in the 2025 FIFA Club World Cup, an international club soccer tournament organized by FIFA. It comprised four teams: Paris Saint-Germain of France; Atlético Madrid of Spain; Botafogo of Brazil; and Seattle Sounders FC of the United States. Teams qualified by winning the respective continental club championships of their confederation or through a ranking of their performance in competitions. Only two clubs per country were allowed to qualify unless three or four won their respective continental club championship. The 2025 edition of the FIFA Club World Cup was the first in the tournament's history to be played under its quadrennial format with 32 teams.

The tournament was hosted by the United States and all matches in Group B were played at two West Coast venues—Lumen Field in Seattle, Washington; and the Rose Bowl in Pasadena, California, near Los Angeles. A temporary hybrid grass pitch was installed at Lumen Field for the tournament instead of using the stadium's normal artificial turf. The Sounders were automatically placed in Group B during the tournament draw due to their status as a host team. Following the draw in December 2024, Group B was labeled the tournament's "group of death" due to the strength of the teams. The group's matches began on June 15 and concluded on June 23.

Group B had the highest total attendance of the tournament, with 289,725 spectators and an average of 48,288 at the six matches.

== Teams ==
The four teams in Group B were decided by the FIFA Club World Cup draw held by FIFA on December 5, 2024, in the Miami area. The 32 participants were divided into four pots based on their confederation and ranking within FIFA's club ranking system. Each of the eight groups would receive one team from each pot. Teams from the same confederation could not be drawn into the same group except for those from UEFA, which had twelve slots; teams from the same national association were not able to be drawn into the same group. For scheduling purposes, Seattle Sounders FC were automatically placed in Group B but remained in their assigned Pot 4 position.

2025 FIFA Club World Cup Group B draw
Draw position	Team	Association	Pot	Confederation	Method of qualification	Date of qualification	Appearance	Last appearance	Previous best performance
B1	Paris Saint-Germain	France	1	UEFA	UEFA four-year ranking (2nd among eligible)	December 17, 2023	1st	—N/a	—N/a
B2	Atlético Madrid	Spain	2	UEFA	UEFA four-year ranking (6th among eligible)	April 16, 2024	1st	—N/a	—N/a
B3	Botafogo	Brazil	3	CONMEBOL	Winners of the 2024 Copa Libertadores	November 30, 2024	1st	—N/a	—N/a
B4	Seattle Sounders FC	United States	4	CONCACAF	Winners of the 2022 CONCACAF Champions League	March 14, 2023 (Note: Qualification was confirmed on this date by FIFA.)	2nd	2022	Second round (2022)

== Standings ==
Pos	Team	Pld	W	D	L	GF	GA	GD	Pts	Qualification
1	(France) Paris Saint-Germain	3	2	0	1	6	1	+5	6 (Note: Tied on head-to-head points (3). Head-to-head goal difference: Paris Saint-Germain +3, Botafogo 0, Atlético Madrid –3.)	Advance to knockout stage
2	(Brazil) Botafogo	3	2	0	1	3	2	+1	6	Advance to knockout stage
3	(Spain) Atlético Madrid	3	2	0	1	4	5	−1	6	
4	(United States) Seattle Sounders FC	3	0	0	3	2	7	−5	0	

Source: FIFA
Rules for classification: Group stage tiebreakers
Notes:

In the round of 16:

- The winners of Group B, Paris Saint-Germain, advanced to play the runners-up of Group A, Inter Miami CF.
- The runners-up of Group B, Botafogo, advanced to play the winners of Group A, Palmeiras.

== Matches ==
Matches took place from June 15 to 23. All times listed are in the local Pacific Daylight Time (UTC−7).

=== Paris Saint-Germain vs Atlético Madrid ===
The opening match of Group B was contested by Paris Saint-Germain and Atlético Madrid, who both qualified through UEFA's four-year club ranking. They had previously met in one competitive match, a league phase match in the 2024–25 UEFA Champions League, which Atlético Madrid won 2–1 at the Parc des Princes in Paris.

June 15, 2025
12:00 pm PDT

Paris Saint-Germain (France)	4–0	(Spain) Atlético Madrid
Fabián 19'; Vitinha 45+1'; Mayulu 87'; Lee Kang-in 90+7' (pen.)	Report

Rose Bowl, Pasadena
Attendance: 80,619
Referee: István Kovács (Romania)

Paris Saint-Germain	Atlético Madrid

GK	1	(Italy) Gianluigi Donnarumma
RB	2	(Morocco) Achraf Hakimi
CB	5	(Brazil) Marquinhos (c)	(yellow card) 62'
CB	51	(Ecuador) Willian Pacho
LB	25	(Portugal) Nuno Mendes		(substituted off) 79'
DM	17	(Portugal) Vitinha
CM	87	(Portugal) João Neves
CM	8	(Spain) Fabián Ruiz	(yellow card) 28'	(substituted off) 72'
RF	14	(France) Désiré Doué		(substituted off) 80'
CF	9	(Portugal) Gonçalo Ramos		(substituted off) 66'
LF	7	(Georgia (country)) Khvicha Kvaratskhelia		(substituted off) 72'
Substitutions:
MF	24	(France) Senny Mayulu		(substituted on) 66'
MF	33	(France) Warren Zaïre-Emery		(substituted on) 72'
MF	19	(South Korea) Lee Kang-in		(substituted on) 72'
DF	21	(France) Lucas Hernandez		(substituted on) 79'
FW	49	(France) Ibrahim Mbaye		(substituted on) 80'
Manager:
(Spain) Luis Enrique

GK	13	(Slovenia) Jan Oblak (c)
RB	14	(Spain) Marcos Llorente
CB	24	(Spain) Robin Le Normand	(yellow card) 25'
CB	15	(France) Clément Lenglet	(yellow card) 20' (yellow-red card) 78'
LB	21	(Spain) Javi Galán		(substituted off) 62'
RM	22	(Argentina) Giuliano Simeone	(yellow card) 29'	(substituted off) 62'
CM	5	(Argentina) Rodrigo De Paul		(substituted off) 62'
CM	8	(Spain) Pablo Barrios		(substituted off) 70'
LM	12	(Brazil) Samuel Lino		(substituted off) 46'
CF	7	(France) Antoine Griezmann
CF	19	(Argentina) Julián Alvarez
Substitutions:
MF	6	(Spain) Koke	(yellow card) 48'	(substituted on) 46'
DF	23	(Mozambique) Reinildo Mandava	(yellow card) 64'	(substituted on) 62'
MF	4	(England) Conor Gallagher		(substituted on) 62'
FW	10	(Argentina) Ángel Correa	(yellow card) 63'	(substituted on) 62'
FW	9	(Norway) Alexander Sørloth		(substituted on) 70'
Manager:
(Argentina) Diego Simeone

Man of the Match:
Vitinha (Paris Saint-Germain)

Assistant referees:
Mihai Marius Marica (Romania)
Ferencz Tunyogi (Romania)
Fourth official:
Gustavo Tejera (Uruguay)
Video assistant referee:
Bastian Dankert (Germany)
Assistant video assistant referee:
Ivan Bebek (Croatia)
Support video assistant referee:
Rob Dieperink (Netherlands)

=== Botafogo vs Seattle Sounders FC ===
June 15, 2025
7:00 pm PDT

Botafogo (Brazil)	2–1	(United States) Seattle Sounders FC
Jair Cunha 28'; Igor Jesus 44'	Report	C. Roldan 75'

Lumen Field, Seattle
Attendance: 30,151
Referee: Glenn Nyberg (Sweden)

Botafogo	Seattle Sounders FC

GK	12	(Brazil) John
RB	2	(Brazil) Vitinho
CB	32	(Brazil) Jair Cunha
CB	20	(Argentina) Alexander Barboza	(yellow card) 61'
LB	13	(Brazil) Alex Telles		(substituted off) 69'
RM	7	(Brazil) Artur
CM	26	(Brazil) Gregore
CM	17	(Brazil) Marlon Freitas (c)		(substituted off) 85'
LM	10	(Venezuela) Jefferson Savarino		(substituted off) 69'
CF	39	(Uruguay) Gonzalo Mastriani		(substituted off) 46'
CF	99	(Brazil) Igor Jesus		(substituted off) 85'
Substitutions:
FW	30	(Argentina) Joaquín Correa	(yellow card) 64'	(substituted on) 46'
FW	98	(Brazil) Arthur Cabral		(substituted on) 69'
DF	66	(Brazil) Cuiabano		(substituted on) 69'
MF	5	(Brazil) Danilo Barbosa		(substituted on) 85'
MF	23	(Uruguay) Santiago Rodríguez		(substituted on) 85'
Manager:
(Portugal) Renato Paiva

GK	24	(Switzerland) Stefan Frei (c)
RB	16	(El Salvador) Alex Roldán
CB	20	(South Korea) Kim Kee-hee		(substituted off) 46'
CB	25	(United States) Jackson Ragen	(yellow card) 87'
LB	5	(Cameroon) Nouhou Tolo	(yellow card) 36'	(substituted off) 46'
CM	18	(Mexico) Obed Vargas
CM	7	(United States) Cristian Roldan
RW	9	(United States) Jesús Ferreira		(substituted off) 71'
AM	11	(Slovakia) Albert Rusnák
LW	77	(England) Ryan Kent		(substituted off) 71'
CF	19	(United States) Danny Musovski		(substituted off) 84'
Substitutions:
DF	15	(Jamaica) Jon Bell		(substituted on) 46'
MF	21	(United States) Reed Baker-Whiting		(substituted on) 46'
FW	14	(United States) Paul Rothrock		(substituted on) 71'
FW	10	(Argentina) Pedro de la Vega		(substituted on) 71'
FW	95	(Guyana) Osaze De Rosario		(substituted on) 84'
Manager:
(United States) Brian Schmetzer

Man of the Match:
Igor Jesus (Botafogo)

Assistant referees:
Mahbod Beigi (Sweden)
Andreas Söderkvist (Sweden)
Fourth official:
Campbell-Kirk Kawana-Waugh (New Zealand)
Video assistant referee:
Marco Di Bello (Italy)
Assistant video assistant referee:
Bram Van Driessche (Belgium)
Support video assistant referee:
Shaun Evans (Australia)

=== Seattle Sounders FC vs Atlético Madrid ===
June 19, 2025
3:00 pm PDT

Seattle Sounders FC (United States)	1–3	(Spain) Atlético Madrid
Rusnák 50'	Report	Barrios 11', 55'; Witsel 47'

Lumen Field, Seattle
Attendance: 51,636
Referee: Yael Falcón (Argentina)

Seattle Sounders FC	Atlético Madrid

GK	24	(Switzerland) Stefan Frei (c)
RB	85	(United States) Kalani Kossa-Rienzi		(substituted off) 79'
CB	25	(United States) Jackson Ragen
CB	15	(Jamaica) Jon Bell
LB	21	(United States) Reed Baker-Whiting
CM	7	(United States) Cristian Roldan
CM	18	(Mexico) Obed Vargas
RW	10	(Argentina) Pedro de la Vega		(substituted off) 60'
AM	11	(Slovakia) Albert Rusnák		(substituted off) 79'
LW	14	(United States) Paul Rothrock	(yellow card) 63'	(substituted off) 66'
CF	19	(United States) Danny Musovski		(substituted off) 60'
Substitutions:
FW	9	(United States) Jesús Ferreira		(substituted on) 60'
FW	77	(England) Ryan Kent		(substituted on) 60'
DF	16	(El Salvador) Alex Roldán		(substituted on) 66'
MF	6	(Brazil) João Paulo		(substituted on) 79'
FW	93	(Ivory Coast) Georgi Minoungou		(substituted on) 79'
Manager:
(United States) Brian Schmetzer

GK	13	(Slovenia) Jan Oblak
RB	14	(Spain) Marcos Llorente
CB	2	(Uruguay) José María Giménez		(substituted off) 46'
CB	24	(Spain) Robin Le Normand
LB	21	(Spain) Javi Galán
RM	22	(Argentina) Giuliano Simeone
CM	5	(Argentina) Rodrigo De Paul	(yellow card) 42'	(substituted off) 65'
CM	6	(Spain) Koke (c)		(substituted off) 70'
LM	8	(Spain) Pablo Barrios
CF	9	(Norway) Alexander Sørloth		(substituted off) 65'
CF	19	(Argentina) Julián Alvarez		(substituted off) 82'
Substitutions:
MF	20	(Belgium) Axel Witsel		(substituted on) 46'
FW	7	(France) Antoine Griezmann		(substituted on) 65'
MF	4	(England) Conor Gallagher	(yellow card) 77'	(substituted on) 65'
FW	10	(Argentina) Ángel Correa		(substituted on) 70'
DF	16	(Argentina) Nahuel Molina		(substituted on) 82'
Manager:
(Argentina) Diego Simeone

Man of the Match:
Pablo Barrios (Atlético Madrid)

Assistant referees:
Maximiliano Del Yesso (Argentina)
Facundo Rodríguez (Argentina)
Fourth official:
Campbell-Kirk Kawana-Waugh (New Zealand)
Video assistant referee:
Hernán Mastrángelo (Argentina)
Assistant video assistant referee:
Juan Soto (Venezuela)
Support video assistant referee:
Leodán González (Uruguay)

=== Paris Saint-Germain vs Botafogo ===
June 19, 2025
6:00 pm PDT

Paris Saint-Germain (France)	0–1	(Brazil) Botafogo
	Report	Igor Jesus 36'

Rose Bowl, Pasadena
Attendance: 53,699
Referee: Drew Fischer (Canada)

Paris Saint-Germain	Botafogo

GK	1	(Italy) Gianluigi Donnarumma
RB	2	(Morocco) Achraf Hakimi (c)
CB	4	(Brazil) Lucas Beraldo
CB	51	(Ecuador) Willian Pacho
LB	21	(France) Lucas Hernandez	(substituted off) 55'
DM	17	(Portugal) Vitinha
CM	33	(France) Warren Zaïre-Emery	(substituted off) 55'
CM	24	(France) Senny Mayulu	(substituted off) 55'
RF	14	(France) Désiré Doué	(substituted off) 79'
CF	9	(Portugal) Gonçalo Ramos	(substituted off) 55'
LF	7	(Georgia (country)) Khvicha Kvaratskhelia
Substitutions:
MF	8	(Spain) Fabián Ruiz	(substituted on) 55'
FW	29	(France) Bradley Barcola	(substituted on) 55'
DF	25	(Portugal) Nuno Mendes	(substituted on) 55'
MF	87	(Portugal) João Neves	(substituted on) 55'
MF	19	(South Korea) Lee Kang-in	(substituted on) 79'
Manager:
(Spain) Luis Enrique

GK	12	(Brazil) John
RB	2	(Brazil) Vitinho
CB	32	(Brazil) Jair Cunha
CB	20	(Argentina) Alexander Barboza
LB	13	(Brazil) Alex Telles		(substituted off) 68'
DM	26	(Brazil) Gregore	(yellow card) 57'
CM	25	(Brazil) Allan		(substituted off) 86'
CM	17	(Brazil) Marlon Freitas (c)
RF	7	(Brazil) Artur		(substituted off) 77'
CF	99	(Brazil) Igor Jesus
LF	10	(Venezuela) Jefferson Savarino		(substituted off) 68'
Substitutions:
MF	23	(Uruguay) Santiago Rodríguez		(substituted on) 68'
DF	66	(Brazil) Cuiabano	(yellow card) 89'	(substituted on) 68'
MF	8	(Argentina) Álvaro Montoro		(substituted on) 77'
MF	28	(Brazil) Newton		(substituted on) 86'
Manager:
(Portugal) Renato Paiva

Man of the Match:
Igor Jesus (Botafogo)

Assistant referees:
Micheal Barwegen (Canada)
Lyes Arfa (Canada)
Fourth official:
Gustavo Tejera (Uruguay)
Video assistant referee:
Shaun Evans (Australia)
Assistant video assistant referee:
Guillermo Pacheco (Mexico)
Support video assistant referee:
Marco Di Bello (Italy)

=== Seattle Sounders FC vs Paris Saint-Germain ===
June 23, 2025
12:00 pm PDT

Seattle Sounders FC (United States)	0–2	(France) Paris Saint-Germain
	Report	Kvaratskhelia 35'; Hakimi 66'

Lumen Field, Seattle
Attendance: 50,628
Referee: Cristián Garay (Chile)

Seattle Sounders FC	Paris Saint-Germain

GK	24	(Switzerland) Stefan Frei (c)
RB	16	(El Salvador) Alex Roldán
CB	25	(United States) Jackson Ragen
CB	15	(Jamaica) Jon Bell	(substituted off) 72'
LB	5	(Cameroon) Nouhou Tolo
CM	18	(Mexico) Obed Vargas	(substituted off) 87'
CM	7	(United States) Cristian Roldan
RW	77	(England) Ryan Kent	(substituted off) 57'
AM	11	(Slovakia) Albert Rusnák	(substituted off) 72'
LW	14	(United States) Paul Rothrock
CF	9	(United States) Jesús Ferreira	(substituted off) 57'
Substitutions:
DF	85	(United States) Kalani Kossa-Rienzi	(substituted on) 57'
FW	19	(United States) Danny Musovski	(substituted on) 57'
FW	93	(Ivory Coast) Georgi Minoungou	(substituted on) 72'
MF	75	(United States) Danny Leyva	(substituted on) 72'
FW	13	(United States) Jordan Morris	(substituted on) 87'
Manager:
(United States) Brian Schmetzer

GK	1	(Italy) Gianluigi Donnarumma
RB	2	(Morocco) Achraf Hakimi
CB	5	(Brazil) Marquinhos (c)
CB	51	(Ecuador) Willian Pacho
LB	25	(Portugal) Nuno Mendes
DM	17	(Portugal) Vitinha
CM	87	(Portugal) João Neves	(yellow card) 44'	(substituted off) 64'
CM	8	(Spain) Fabián Ruiz
RF	14	(France) Désiré Doué		(substituted off) 83'
CF	24	(France) Senny Mayulu		(substituted off) 77'
LF	7	(Georgia (country)) Khvicha Kvaratskhelia		(substituted off) 64'
Substitutions:
MF	33	(France) Warren Zaïre-Emery		(substituted on) 64'
FW	29	(France) Bradley Barcola		(substituted on) 64'
FW	9	(Portugal) Gonçalo Ramos		(substituted on) 77'
FW	49	(France) Ibrahim Mbaye		(substituted on) 83'
Manager:
(Spain) Luis Enrique

Man of the Match:
Achraf Hakimi (Paris Saint-Germain)

Assistant referees:
Miguel Rocha (Chile)
José Retamal (Chile)
Fourth official:
Campbell-Kirk Kawana-Waugh (New Zealand)
Video assistant referee:
Juan Lara (Chile)
Assistant video assistant referee:
Nicolás Gallo (Colombia)
Support video assistant referee:
Ivan Bebek (Croatia)

=== Atlético Madrid vs Botafogo ===
June 23, 2025
12:00 pm PDT

Atlético Madrid (Spain)	1–0	(Brazil) Botafogo
Griezmann 87'	Report

Rose Bowl, Pasadena
Attendance: 22,992
Referee: César Ramos (Mexico)

Atlético Madrid	Botafogo

GK	13	(Slovenia) Jan Oblak (c)
RB	14	(Spain) Marcos Llorente
CB	24	(Spain) Robin Le Normand
CB	15	(France) Clément Lenglet
LB	21	(Spain) Javi Galán
RM	22	(Argentina) Giuliano Simeone	(substituted off) 59'
CM	5	(Argentina) Rodrigo De Paul	(substituted off) 65'
CM	8	(Spain) Pablo Barrios	(substituted off) 84'
LM	4	(England) Conor Gallagher	(substituted off) 46'
CF	9	(Norway) Alexander Sørloth	(substituted off) 84'
CF	19	(Argentina) Julián Alvarez
Substitutions:
FW	7	(France) Antoine Griezmann	(substituted on) 46'
FW	10	(Argentina) Ángel Correa	(substituted on) 59'
MF	6	(Spain) Koke	(substituted on) 65'
DF	16	(Argentina) Nahuel Molina	(substituted on) 84'
MF	12	(Brazil) Samuel Lino	(substituted on) 84'
Manager:
(Argentina) Diego Simeone

GK	12	(Brazil) John
RB	2	(Brazil) Vitinho		(substituted off) 74'
CB	32	(Brazil) Jair Cunha
CB	20	(Argentina) Alexander Barboza
LB	13	(Brazil) Alex Telles		(substituted off) 65'
DM	26	(Brazil) Gregore	(yellow card) 90+5'
CM	25	(Brazil) Allan		(substituted off) 59'
CM	17	(Brazil) Marlon Freitas (c)
RF	7	(Brazil) Artur		(substituted off) 74'
CF	99	(Brazil) Igor Jesus
LF	10	(Venezuela) Jefferson Savarino		(substituted off) 65'
Substitutions:
MF	28	(Brazil) Newton		(substituted on) 59'
DF	66	(Brazil) Cuiabano		(substituted on) 65'
MF	8	(Argentina) Álvaro Montoro		(substituted on) 65'
DF	4	(Uruguay) Mateo Ponte		(substituted on) 74'
MF	23	(Uruguay) Santiago Rodríguez		(substituted on) 74'
Manager:
(Portugal) Renato Paiva

Man of the Match:
Antoine Griezmann (Atlético Madrid)

Assistant referees:
Alberto Morín (Mexico)
Marco Bisguerra (Mexico)
Fourth official:
Gustavo Tejera (Uruguay)
Video assistant referee:
Guillermo Pacheco (Mexico)
Assistant video assistant referee:
Erick Miranda (Mexico)
Support video assistant referee:
Tatiana Guzmán (Nicaragua)

== Discipline ==
Fair play points would have been used as tiebreakers if the overall and head-to-head records of teams were tied. These were calculated based on yellow and red cards received in all group matches as follows:

- first yellow card: −1 point;
- indirect red card (second yellow card): −3 points;
- direct red card: −4 points;
- yellow card and direct red card: −5 points;

Only one of the above deductions was applied to a player in a single match.

Team	Match 1				Match 2				Match 3				Points
Team	Booked	(yellow card) (yellow-red card)	Sent off (straight red)	(yellow card) (red card)	Booked	(yellow card) (yellow-red card)	Sent off (straight red)	(yellow card) (red card)	Booked	(yellow card) (yellow-red card)	Sent off (straight red)	(yellow card) (red card)	Points
(France) Paris Saint-Germain	2								1				−3
(United States) Seattle Sounders	2				1								−3
(Brazil) Botafogo	2				2				1				−5
(Spain) Atlético Madrid	5	1			2								−10
