= Leo Burney =

American soccer player (born 2001)

Personal information
- Date of birth: November 2, 2001 (age 25)
- Place of birth: Bellingham, Washington, United States
- Height: 1.91 m (6 ft 3 in)
- Position: Defender

Team information
- Current team: Drogheda United
- Number: 5

Youth career
- –2010: Blue Arrows
- 2010–2015: Seattle United
- 2015–2020: Seattle Sounders FC

College career
Years	Team	Apps	(Gls)
2021–2024	Penn Quakers	69	(11)

Senior career*
Years	Team	Apps	(Gls)
2018	Seattle Sounders FC 2	3	(0)
2022–2024	Ballard FC	39	(1)
2024–2025	Seattle Sounders FC	0	(0)
2025	→ Tacoma Defiance (loan)	17	(1)
2026–	Drogheda United	25	(3)
- * Club domestic league appearances and goals as of 17:48, 10 November 2026 (UTC)

Leo Burney (born November 2, 2001) is an American soccer player who plays for League of Ireland First Division club Drogheda United.

== Career ==
Burney started his youth career with local side Blue Arrows before joining Seattle United in 2010. He joined the Seattle Sounders FC academy in 2015. He made his debut for USL club Seattle Sounders FC 2 in August 2018.

In the summer of 2022, Burney joined the inaugural roster for USL League Two club Ballard FC. He rejoined the team for the 2023 season and helped the team to the league championship.

While at the University of Pennsylvania, Burney was named to the All-Ivy League First Team all four years, and was twice named Ivy League Defensive Player of the Year in 2022 and 2024.

In December 2024, Burney signed with the Seattle Sounders FC first team for the 2025 season, with club options for the next three years.

On 25 November 2025, it was announced that he would be leaving Seattle Sounders after the club declined the option on his contract.

On 10 January 2026, Burney signed for League of Ireland Premier Division club Drogheda United. He scored 3 goals in 28 appearances in all competitions in 2026, as the club was relegated following a 2–1 defeat to UCD in the Promotion/Relegation Playoff.

== Career statistics ==
As of match played on 8 November 2026

Appearances and goals by club, season and competition
Club	Season	League			National Cup (Note: Includes appearances in the U.S. Open Cup, FAI Cup)		Continental		Other		Total	
Club	Season	Division	Apps	Goals	Apps	Goals	Apps	Goals	Apps	Goals	Apps	Goals
Seattle Sounders	2025	Major League Soccer	0	0	0	0	0	0	0	0	0	0
Tacoma Defiance (Loan)	2025	MLS Next Pro	17	1	2	0	–		0	0	19	1
Drogheda United	2026	LOI Premier Division	25	3	1	0	–		2 (Note: One appearance in the Leinster Senior Cup and one appearance in the 2026 League of Ireland play-offs)	0	28	3
Career total			42	4	3	0	0	0	2	0	47	4

== Honours ==
=== Team ===
Sounders Academy

- 2018 Generation Adidas Cup.

Ballard FC

- 2023 USL League Two.

=== Individual ===
- Ivy League Defensive Player of the Year. 2022, 2024.
