= Ryan Kent =

English footballer (born 1996)

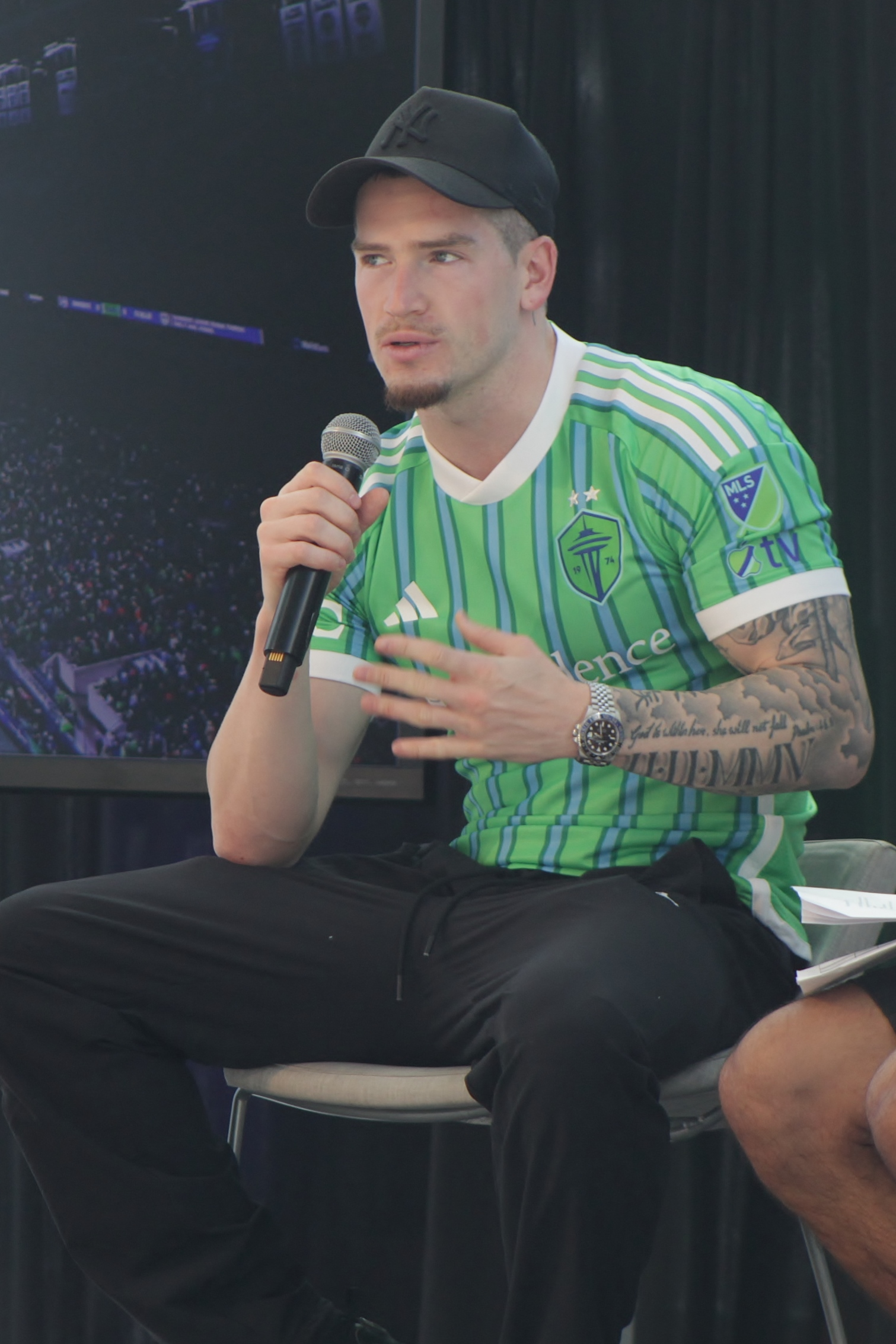
- Kent with Seattle Sounders FC in 2025

Personal information
- Full name: Ryan Kent
- Date of birth: 11 November 1996 (age 29)
- Place of birth: Oldham, England
- Height: 5 ft 9 in (1.76 m)
- Position: Left winger

Youth career
- 2004–2015: Liverpool

Senior career*
Years	Team	Apps	(Gls)
2015–2019	Liverpool	1	(0)
2015–2016	→ Coventry City (loan)	17	(1)
2016–2017	→ Barnsley (loan)	44	(3)
2017–2018	→ SC Freiburg (loan)	6	(0)
2018	→ Bristol City (loan)	10	(0)
2018–2019	→ Rangers (loan)	27	(6)
2019–2023	Rangers	113	(22)
2023–2024	Fenerbahçe	8	(0)
2025–2026	Seattle Sounders FC	11	(0)

International career
2013–2014	England U18	2	(2)
2015	England U20	6	(1)
- * Club domestic league appearances and goals as of 28 June 2025

Ryan Kent (born 11 November 1996) is an English professional footballer who plays as a forward or winger. He is currently a free agent.

A graduate of the Liverpool academy, Kent made his single first-team appearance for the club in January 2016, after a loan spell with Coventry City. He spent the 2016–17 season on loan at Barnsley and won the club's Young Player of the Season award. After a loan spell with German club Freiburg in 2017, he departed on loan once again, joining Bristol City. Kent signed for Scottish club Rangers permanently in September 2019, after winning the PFA Scotland Young Player of the Year award while playing for them on loan in the 2018–19 season.

He spent five seasons with Rangers and played in over 150 total matches across all competitions, including in the UEFA Champions League and UEFA Europa League. Kent signed with Turkish side Fenerbahçe in 2023 and played for just over a year before his contract was terminated by mutual agreement in late 2024. After several months without a club, he arrived in the United States and had been signed with the Sounders.

Kent is a former England youth international, having represented the nation at under-18 and under-20 levels.

== Club career ==
=== Liverpool ===
==== Early career ====
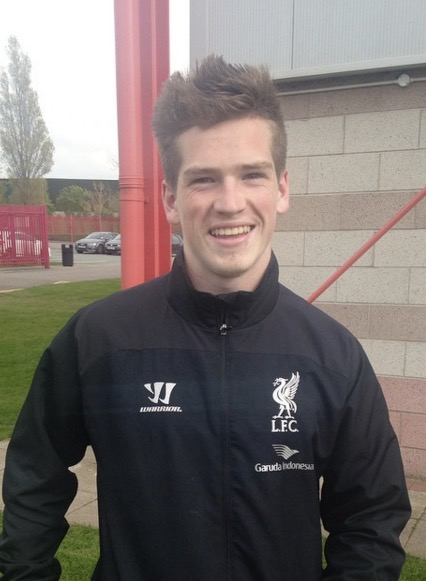
Kent after a Liverpool U18 match in 2015

Oldham-born Kent joined Liverpool at the age of seven and progressed through the Liverpool academy to become a regular member of the U21 squad. After an impressive end to the 2014–15 campaign for the reserves his performances were rewarded with a new four-and-a-half-year contract in March 2015. This was followed by a call-up to the first-team squad for their 2015 pre-season tour with the player being named in Liverpool's 30-man squad for their tour of Thailand, Australia and Malaysia. On 17 July 2015 Kent made his first-team debut when he came off the bench in the 2–1 win over Australian A-League side Brisbane Roar and was handed a first-team squad number for the Reds.

==== Loans to Coventry City and Barnsley ====
Liverpool received a number of offers to take Kent on loan after the player impressed in preseason. Kent eventually joined Coventry City in September 2015, on a youth loan deal for four months until 16 January 2016. He made his professional debut while at Coventry City, as a substitute on 12 September 2015 in a 1–0 League One loss to Scunthorpe United. On 3 November, Kent played and scored in a 4–3 win over Barnsley. The next day it was announced that he would return to Liverpool during the upcoming international break to be assessed by new Liverpool manager Jürgen Klopp. On 5 January 2016, he was recalled by Liverpool and was named in the first-team to make his competitive debut for them, starting the FA Cup third round match away to Exeter City. The match ended 2–2 with Kent being withdrawn from the action after 57 minutes.

On 26 July 2016, Kent was loaned to Barnsley for the season. He scored his first goal for them in a 4–0 win against Rotherham United on 27 August 2016. Kent was named Barnsley's Young Player of the Season at the club's end of season awards.

==== Loans to Freiburg and Bristol City ====
On 10 August 2017, after an impressive preseason, Kent signed a new long-term contract with Liverpool, and was loaned out to Freiburg for the season on the last day of the summer transfer window. After making just six appearances, Kent's loan spell at Freiburg was terminated and he returned to parent club Liverpool on 8 January.

On 12 January 2018, Kent joined Bristol City on loan until the end of the season. His stint with the Robins was unsuccessful, as he played just 10 league games, failing to find the back of the net in any. It was later reported that Bristol City would be fined £300,000 by Liverpool due to Kent's lack of playing time.

=== Rangers ===
==== 2018–19: Initial loan spell ====
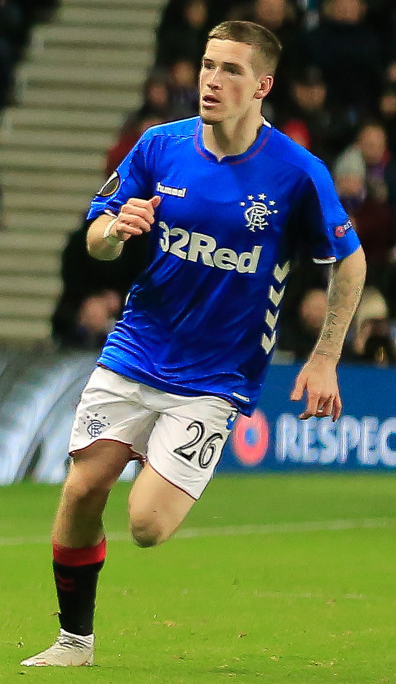
Kent playing for Rangers in 2018

On 22 July 2018, Kent joined Rangers on season-long loan for the 2018–19 season. He made his debut on 26 July 2018 in the Europa League 1-0 victory against NK Osijek. He made his SPFL debut on 5 August 2018, in a 1–1 draw against Aberdeen. His first goal for the club came on 15 September 2018, in a 4-0 victory against Dundee. On 31 March 2019, Kent scored in the Old Firm derby against Celtic in a 2–1 loss. During the match Kent became involved in an altercation with Celtic captain Scott Brown, who was shoved to the ground. Kent was charged by the Scottish FA retrospectively. He received a two match ban after losing his appeal. He made 43 appearances in all competitions, scoring six goals and making nine assists for the club. On 7 April, Kent won the 'Young Player of The Year Award for the 2018–19 season for Rangers at the club's end of season awards. On 5 May 2019, Kent won the 2018–19 PFA Scotland Young Player of the Year after his performance for Rangers. He was also voted in the PFA Scotland Team of the Year for the 2018–19 season.

Kent returned to Liverpool for the 2019–20 pre-season with manager Jürgen Klopp wanting to assess Kent's development, with Rangers manager Steven Gerrard advising he wanted Kent to re-sign for Rangers on loan. Kent was also subject of interest from Leeds United, with Leeds head coach Marcelo Bielsa also personally scouting Kent for Liverpool's pre-season friendly against Bradford City. Kent was involved in pre-season friendlies involving Bradford City, Borussia Dortmund, Sporting CP and Sevilla. Klopp singled out Kent for praise after his performance against Sevilla, saying: "Ryan had sensational moments in the Sevilla game – one-on-one situations are his big strength. He is a wonderful kid, a wonderful player."

==== 2019–2023: Permanent transfer ====
Kent signed for Rangers permanently on 3 September 2019 on a four-year contract. Rangers paid Liverpool an initial transfer fee of £6.5 million, with further payments potentially due for future performance or Kent being sold.

Rangers confirmed on 23 May 2023 that Kent would leave the club at the end of the 2022–23 season.

=== Fenerbahçe ===
On 12 June 2023, Kent signed a four-year deal with Turkish club Fenerbahçe. He scored his first goal for the club in a 5–0 UEFA Europa Conference League second qualifying round win against Zimbru Chișinău on 26 July 2023. Later that year, on 13 August, he made his Süper Lig debut against Gaziantep FK at the Şükrü Saracoğlu Stadium, Fenerbahçe won 2–1.

On 17 October 2024, Fenerbahçe announced that Kent's contract with the club had been terminated by mutual agreement.

=== Seattle Sounders FC ===
On 31 March 2025, Kent signed a one-year contract with Seattle Sounders FC of Major League Soccer for the remainder of the 2025 season. He was sought by the club to replace midfielder Paul Arriola, who had a season-ending injury a few weeks prior. Kent's contract included an option for the 2026 season. He made his MLS debut on 19 April as a late substitute against Nashville SC.

== International career ==
Kent scored two goals in two appearances for the England under-18 team. He made six appearances and scored one goal for the England under-20 team.

== Style of play ==
Kent plays as a winger, comfortable on both flanks, but mainly playing as a left winger, he can also play as a second striker or an attacking midfielder. He is known for his dribbling ability running with the ball, especially with 'one-on-one situations', as well as his workrate and crossing ability.

== Career statistics ==
As of match played 3 May 2025

Appearances and goals by club, season and competition
Clubs	Season	League			National cup (Note: Includes FA Cup, Scottish Cup and Turkish Cup)		League cup (Note: Includes EFL Cup and Scottish League Cup)		Continental		Total	
Clubs	Season	Division	Apps	Goals	Apps	Goals	Apps	Goals	Apps	Goals	Apps	Goals
Liverpool	2015–16	Premier League	0	0	1	0	0	0	0	0	1	0
Liverpool	Total		0	0	1	0	0	0	0	0	1	0
Coventry City (loan)	2015–16	League One	17	1	0	0	0	0	0	0	17	1
Barnsley (loan)	2016–17	Championship	44	3	2	0	1	0	—		47	3
SC Freiburg (loan)	2017–18	Bundesliga	6	0	0	0	—		—		6	0
Bristol City (loan)	2017–18	Championship	10	0	0	0	1	0	—		11	0
Rangers (loan)	2018–19	Scottish Premiership	27	6	4	0	3	0	9 (Note: Appearances in UEFA Europa League)	0	43	6
Rangers	2019–20	Scottish Premiership	21	7	2	0	2	0	8	1	33	8
Rangers	2020–21	Scottish Premiership	37	10	2	0	1	0	12	3	52	13
Rangers	2021–22	Scottish Premiership	26	2	3	0	1	0	16 (Note: Two appearances in UEFA Champions League, fourteen appearances and one goal in UEFA Europa League)	1	46	3
Rangers	2022–23	Scottish Premiership	29	3	4	0	2	0	9 (Note: Appearances in UEFA Champions League)	0	44	3
Rangers	Total		140	28	15	0	9	0	54	5	218	33
Fenerbahçe	2023–24	Süper Lig	8	0	0	0	—		10 (Note: Appearances in UEFA Europa Conference League)	1	18	1
Fenerbahçe	2024–25	Süper Lig	0	0	0	0	—		1	0	1	0
Fenerbahçe	Total		8	0	0	0	0	0	11	1	19	1
Seattle Sounders FC	2025	Major League Soccer	3	0	—		—		0 (Note: Appearances in CONCACAF Champions Cup and Leagues Cup)	0	3	0
Career total			228	32	18	0	12	0	65	6	323	38

== Honours ==
Rangers

- Scottish Premiership: 2020–21
- Scottish Cup: 2021–22
- UEFA Europa League runner-up: 2021–22

Individual

- Barnsley Young Player of the Season: 2016–17
- PFA Scotland Young Player of the Year: 2018–19
- PFA Scotland Team of the Year: 2018–19 Scottish Premiership, 2020–21 Scottish Premiership
- Rangers Young Player of the Year: 2018–19
- UEFA Europa League Team of the Season: 2021–22
