= José Gálvez (footballer) =

Guatemalan footballer

Personal information
- Full name: José Miguel Gálvez Ruiz
- Date of birth: 24 May 1999 (age 27)
- Place of birth: Guatemala City, Guatemala
- Height: 1.73 m (5 ft 8 in)
- Position: Defender

Youth career
- 2015–2017: Estudiantes
- 2017–2018: Huracán de San Rafael
- 2018–2019: Godoy Cruz

Senior career*
Years	Team	Apps	(Gls)
2019–2025	Antigua	109	(4)
2020–2021	→ Quiché (loan)		
2021	→ Iztapa (loan)	11	(0)
2025–2026	Comunicaciones	2	(0)
- * Club domestic league appearances and goals as of 20:00, 10 August 2025 (UTC)

José Miguel Gálvez Ruiz (born 24 May 1999), commonly known as Tito, is a Guatemalan professional footballer who plays as a defender.

== Early life ==
In 2017, Gálvez joined Huracán de San Rafael.

== Club career ==
=== Comunicaciones ===
On 30 May 2025, Gálvez officially signed for Comunicaciones.

== International career ==
On 29 September 2018, Gálvez was called up to the Guatemala U20 team.
