= Obed Vargas =

Footballer (born 2005)

Personal information
- Full name: Obed Gómez Vargas
- Date of birth: August 5, 2005 (age 21)
- Place of birth: Anchorage, Alaska, U.S.
- Height: 5 ft 9 in (1.75 m)
- Position: Central midfielder

Team information
- Current team: Atlético Madrid
- Number: 3

Youth career
- Cook Inlet SC
- 2019–2021: Seattle Sounders FC

Senior career*
Years	Team	Apps	(Gls)
2021	Tacoma Defiance	28	(0)
2021–2026	Seattle Sounders FC	92	(4)
2026–	Atlético Madrid	12	(0)

International career^{‡}
2022	United States U20	9	(0)
2023	United States U23	2	(1)
2024–	Mexico U20	5	(0)
2024–	Mexico U23	3	(0)
2024–	Mexico	13	(0)
- * Club domestic league appearances and goals as of 23:26, May 24, 2026 (UTC) ‡ National team caps and goals as of 6 October 2026

Obed Gómez Vargas (born August 5, 2005) is a professional footballer who plays as a central midfielder for La Liga club Atlético Madrid. Born in the United States, he represents the Mexico national team.

Vargas joined the academy of Seattle Sounders FC in Major League Soccer (MLS) and signed a contract for their reserve team, Tacoma Defiance, in 2021. He made his MLS debut that same year at the age of 15 years old and later became a regular starter for the Sounders, where he played for five seasons. In 2026, he joined Spanish side Atlético Madrid.

== Youth career ==
Born in Anchorage, Alaska, Vargas began his career with Cook Inlet Soccer Club; he also traveled to Arizona to play in youth tournaments where he was later scouted. He moved to Washington and joined the youth academy for Major League Soccer club Seattle Sounders FC at the age of 14.

== Club career ==
=== Seattle Sounders FC ===
Vargas played in the academy of Seattle Sounders FC for two seasons before signing a professional contract with Sounders FC reserve side Tacoma Defiance on May 7, 2021. Two days later, he made his senior debut for Tacoma Defiance in the USL Championship against LA Galaxy II. Vargas started and played 66 minutes as the match ended in a 1–1 draw.

He made his MLS debut for Seattle on July 22, 2021, as one of several Tacoma Defiance players called up to the Sounders for a match against Austin FC to replace injured players. At 15 years and 351 days old, Vargas was the third-youngest player in MLS history. He signed a formal Homegrown Player contract with the Sounders in December and became a starter for the team in the first matches of the 2022 season, playing in two CONCACAF Champions League fixtures. Head coach Brian Schmetzer described Vargas' play style as similar to that of Cristian Roldan's rookie season, adding he was "going to be a tremendous player for our club". He was an early substitute in the second leg of the 2022 CONCACAF Champions League final, which the Sounders won 3–0 at home.

Vargas made 13 appearances through late June, when a stress facture in his back prevented him from continuing with the team. He was also unable to join the under-20 national team in the CONCACAF U-20 Championship. Vargas returned for the 2023 season but played in few matches, including only 24 minutes in the MLS Cup playoffs. He regained the starting position in midfield for the 2024 season and scored his first career MLS goal on April 30, 2024, against the Philadelphia Union, in a match that was originally started a month earlier but postponed due to heavy rain. Vargas played over 3,000 minutes for the Sounders in the 2024 season and was ranked seventh in the MLS 22 Under 22 list at the end of the regular season. He was suspended for the first match of the 2024 playoffs after receiving two yellow card in a match against the Portland Timbers.

During the 2025 regular season, Vargas started in 26 matches and finished second on the team in minutes played. He was a starter for Seattle's three matches in the 2025 FIFA Club World Cup group stage and played for the team's entire 2025 Leagues Cup run, where the Sounders won the title. Vargas was named to the roster for the 2025 MLS All-Star Game and played in the match; he was also ranked first in the 2025 MLS 22 Under 22 list. Vargas was also a finalist for the 2025 MLS Young Player of the Year Award. In his five seasons with the Sounders, Vargas scored 8 goals in 130 appearances across all competitions.

=== Atlético Madrid ===
On February 2, 2026, La Liga club Atlético Madrid announced the signing of Vargas on a four-and-a-half-year contract in the closing hours of the transfer window. He had rejected an earlier offer from Club América of Liga MX to pursue a career in the European leagues. Vargas previously stated that Atlético Madrid had been his favorite team as a child; he also played against them in the 2025 FIFA Club World Cup. He made his debut for Atlético as a substitute in the 79th minute of a Copa del Rey quarterfinal match against Real Betis. He recorded his first goal contribution for Atlético Madrid on May 2nd 2026, providing an assist in a 2–0 victory over Valencia.

== International career ==
=== Youth ===
Vargas was eligible to represent both Mexico and the United States at the international level. In March 2020, Vargas was selected to participate in the United States national under-15 team camp. He was called up by the United States national under-20 team in January 2022. On October 8, 2023, Vargas was called up to the United States national under-23 team ahead of friendlies against Mexico national under-23 and Japan national under-23 teams.

On May 21, 2024, Vargas completed a one-time switch from the United States to Mexico. On June 20, Vargas was called up to the Mexico national under-20 team ahead of friendlies against the Liga TDP, Cruz Azul under-23 and Atlético Morelia teams in preparation for the 2024 CONCACAF U-20 Championship. On August 29, Vargas was called up to the Mexico national under-23 team ahead of two friendlies against the Panama national under-23 team scheduled for September 6 and 10.

In 2025, Vargas was called up by coach Eduardo Arce to represent Mexico at the FIFA U-20 World Cup held in Chile.

=== Senior ===
Upon completing his FIFA one-time switch, in early October 2024, Vargas receives his first call-up, by Javier Aguirre, to the senior national team for October 11 and 15 for friendly matches against Spanish club Valencia CF and the United States respectively. Vargas is the first Alaskan to ever play for a national team. On October 15, Vargas makes his senior Mexico debut entering in the 83rd minute for Jesús Angulo in a friendly match against the United States, which Mexico won 2–0.

Vargas was named in the 26-man squad for the 2026 FIFA World Cup, hosted on home soil. He was one of two U.S.-born players on the squad, along with Illinois-born Brian Gutiérrez.

== Personal life ==
Vargas is of Mexican descent, with his parents hailing from Michoacán, and holds dual U.S. and Mexican citizenship. He is set to receive Spanish citizenship during 2026, being eligible due to his mother holding Spanish citizenship. His father Obed Ayala Vargas played for the youth academy of Monarcas Morelia; his younger brother and two sisters also play football.

== Career statistics ==
=== Club ===
As of match played on 24 May 2026

Appearances and goals by club, season and competition
Club	Season	League			National cup (Note: Includes U.S. Open Cup, Copa del Rey)		Continental		Other		Total	
Club	Season	Division	Apps	Goals	Apps	Goals	Apps	Goals	Apps	Goals	Apps	Goals
Tacoma Defiance	2021	USL Championship	28	0	—		—		—		28	0
Seattle Sounders FC	2021	Major League Soccer	1	0	—		—		0	0	1	0
Seattle Sounders FC	2022	Major League Soccer	13	0	1	0	7 (Note: Appearances in CONCACAF Champions League/Cup)	0	—		21	0
Seattle Sounders FC	2023	Major League Soccer	22	0	1	0	—		4 (Note: Two appearances in Leagues Cup, two appearances in MLS Cup playoffs)	0	27	0
Seattle Sounders FC	2024	Major League Soccer	30	1	2	0	—		8 (Note: Five appearances and one goal in Leagues Cup, three appearances in MLS Cup playoffs)	1	40	2
Seattle Sounders FC	2025	Major League Soccer	26	3	—		3	0	12 (Note: Three appearances in FIFA Club World Cup, six appearances and one goal in Leagues Cup, three appearances and two goals in MLS Cup playoffs)	3	41	6
Seattle Sounders FC	Total		92	4	4	0	10	0	24	4	130	8
Atlético Madrid	2025–26	La Liga	12	0	1	0	0	0	—		13	0
Career total			132	4	5	0	10	0	24	4	171	8

=== International ===
As of match played on 6 October 2026

Appearances and goals by national team and year
National team	Year	Apps	Goals
Mexico	2024	1	0
Mexico	2025	1	0
Mexico	2026	11	0
Total		13	0

== Honours ==
Seattle Sounders FC

- CONCACAF Champions League: 2022
- Leagues Cup: 2025

Atlético Madrid

- Copa del Rey runner-up: 2025–26

Individual

- MLS All-Star: 2025
- IFFHS Men's Youth (U20) CONCACAF Best XI: 2025
