= Travian Sousa =

American soccer player (born 2001)

Personal information
- Full name: Travian Anthony Sousa
- Date of birth: September 19, 2001 (age 25)
- Place of birth: Lathrop, California, United States
- Height: 5 ft 11 in (1.80 m)
- Position: Left-back

Team information
- Current team: AB
- Number: 21

Youth career
- –2016: Ballistic United SC
- 2016–2019: Sacramento Republic FC
- 2019–2020: Hamburger SV

Senior career*
Years	Team	Apps	(Gls)
2019–2020	Hamburger SV II	2	(0)
2021	Sporting Kansas City II	0	(0)
2021	Oakland Roots	2	(0)
2022–2024	Tacoma Defiance	61	(3)
2025	Seattle Sounders FC	0	(0)
2025	→ FC Tulsa (loan)	7	(0)
2026–	AB	13	(2)

International career^{‡}
- United States U19
2019	United States U20	1	(0)
- * Club domestic league appearances and goals as of June 18, 2026 ‡ National team caps and goals as of October 12, 2021

Travian Anthony Sousa (born September 19, 2001) is an American professional soccer player who plays as a left-back for Danish 2nd Division for AB.

== Club career ==
=== Youth ===
Sousa played in the US Soccer Development Academy for Sacramento Republic after joining them from Ballistic United SC in 2016. In total, Sousa made 82 appearances in the USSDA, scoring a total of 24 goals.

=== Hamburger SV ===
In July 2019, Sousa moved to Germany, joining the Hamburger SV acacdemy. Sousa went on to make 14 appearances with the team's U-19s in the A-Junioren Bundesliga, tallying four assists. Sousa also made two appearances for Hamburger SV II in the Regionalliga Nord. He left Hamburg in October 2020, reportedly having his contract terminated for "disciplinary reasons", but the player saying the decision was "mutual" between both player and club.

=== Sporting Kansas City II ===
On January 29, 2021, Sousa returned to the United States, joining USL Championship club Sporting Kansas City II. Sousa and Kansas City mutually agreed to terminate his contract with the club on September 23, 2021, without him making an appearance for the club.

=== Oakland Roots ===
On September 28, 2021, Sousa returned to California, signing with USL Championship side Oakland Roots. He made his debut for Oakland on October 6, 2021, appearing as a 90th-minute substitute in a 2–1 win over Sacramento Republic. Sousa's contract option wasn't picked up by Oakland following their 2021 season.

=== Tacoma Defiance ===
On March 18, 2022, it was announced that Sousa had signed with MLS Next Pro club Tacoma Defiance.

=== Seattle Sounders FC ===
Sousa joined the Seattle Sounders FC first team on December 11, 2024. He was loaned to FC Tulsa of the USL Championship on September 8, 2025, for the remainder of the season.

=== AB ===
In January 2026 it was confirmed, that Sousa had joined Danish 2nd Division for AB.

== International career ==
Sousa has been a regular member of the United States at various youth levels.

== Personal ==
Sousa holds dual American and Portuguese citizenship.

== Career statistics ==
As of May 7, 2023

Club	Season	League			National cup		Continental		Other		Total	
Club	Season	Division	Apps	Goals	Apps	Goals	Apps	Goals	Apps	Goals	Apps	Goals
Hamburger SV II	2019–20	Regionalliga Nord	2	0	–		–		–		2	0
Oakland Roots	2021	USL Championship	2	0	–		–		1	0	3	0
Tacoma Defiance	2022	MLS Next Pro	16	2	–		–		–		16	2
Tacoma Defiance	2023	MLS Next Pro	6	0	–		–		–		6	0
Tacoma Defiance	Total		22	2	–		–		–		22	2
Career total			26	2	0	0	0	0	1	0	27	2
