= Pedro de la Vega =

Argentine footballer (born 2001)

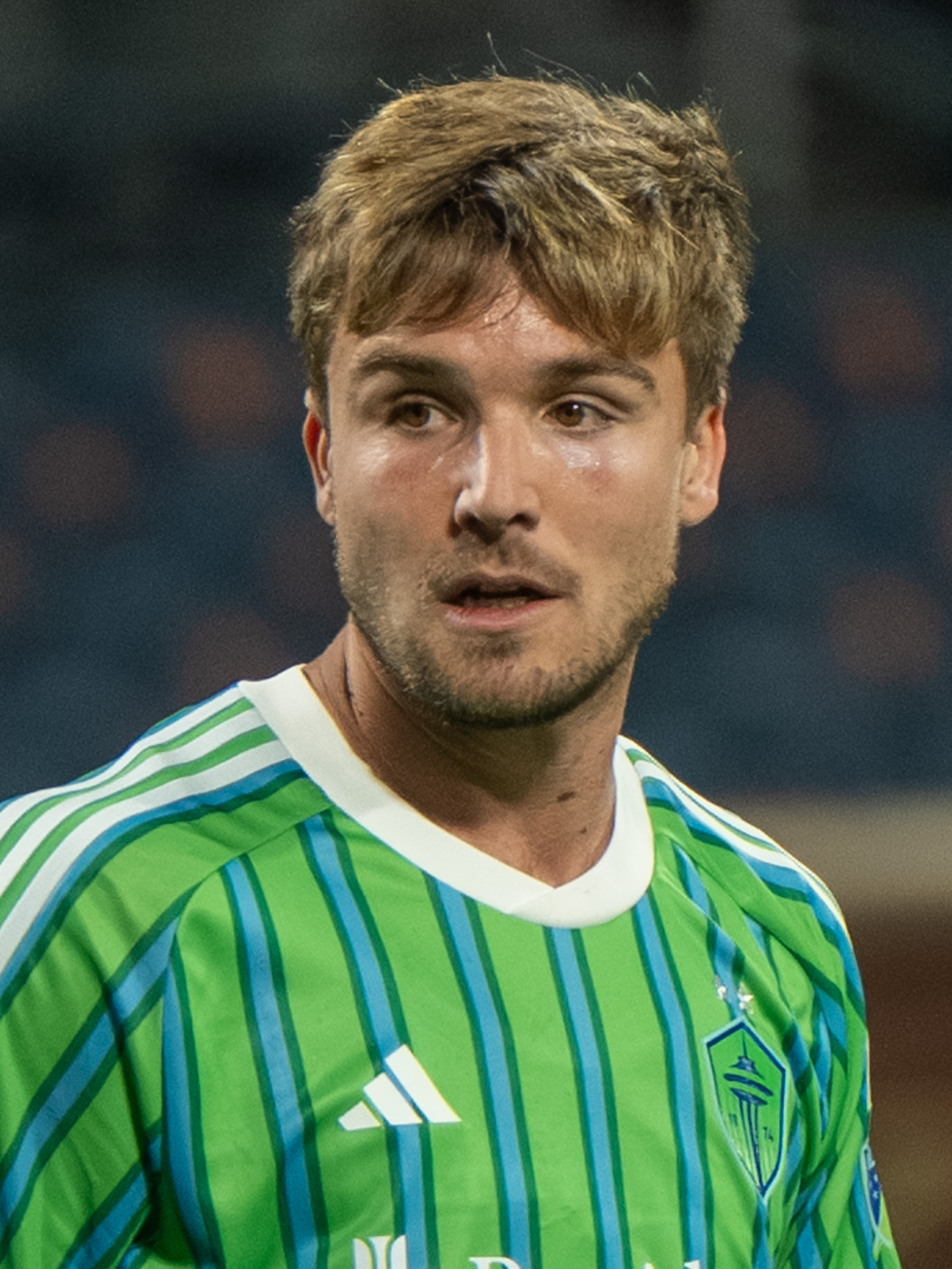
- de la Vega with the Seattle Sounders in 2025

Personal information
- Full name: Pedro de la Vega
- Date of birth: 7 February 2001 (age 25)
- Place of birth: Olavarría, Buenos Aires, Argentina
- Height: 1.72 m (5 ft 8 in)
- Position: Winger

Team information
- Current team: Seattle Sounders FC
- Number: 10

Youth career
- Ferrocarril Sud
- 2015–2018: Lanús

Senior career*
Years	Team	Apps	(Gls)
2018–2023	Lanús	103	(13)
2024–	Seattle Sounders	23	(3)

International career
2019	Argentina U20	12	(0)
- * Club domestic league appearances and goals as of 3 September 2025

Pedro de la Vega (born 7 February 2001) is an Argentine professional footballer who plays as a winger for Major League Soccer club Seattle Sounders FC.

== Club career ==
=== Lanús ===
De la Vega started his career in the youth of Ferrocarril Sud before joining Lanús in 2015, having previously been rejected in trials with Boca Juniors and River Plate. Having been moved into the Argentine Primera División club's first-team squad for 2018–19, De la Vega was selected for his professional debut on 16 September 2018 during a home loss to Racing Club. He made two further appearances in September against Newell's Old Boys and River Plate respectively. He scored his first goal in the 2019 Copa de la Superliga, netting in a round of sixteen defeat to Vélez Sarsfield.

=== Seattle Sounders ===
On 24 January 2024, de la Vega joined Major League Soccer (MLS) side Seattle Sounders FC as a Designated Player for a club record $7.5 million transfer fee, with Lanús retaining a 20% stake in any future sales. He signed a contract with the Sounders through the 2027 MLS season, with a club option for 2028. De la Vega had been scouted by the team six years prior and began negotiations in 2023. He made his MLS debut in the season opener on 24 February against Los Angeles FC and scored a penalty kick in the 2–1 loss. Pedro de la Vega left early in the second half of the team's home match on 2 March with a right hamstring injury. The Sounders later announced the injury would prevent him from playing for six to eight weeks.

On 31 July, de la Vega scored two goals in a 7–0 defeat of Cruz Azul in the 2025 Leagues Cup. His second goal was later nominated for the FIFA Puskás Award.

== International career ==
In October 2018, de la Vega was selected to train with the Argentina U20s. In December, De la Vega was picked for the 2019 South American U-20 Championship. In the succeeding May, Fernando Batista called De la Vega up for the 2019 FIFA U-20 World Cup in Poland. He featured twelve times across the two tournaments.

De La Vega competed for Argentina at the 2020 Summer Olympics. He made three appearances, including one start against Spain.

== Personal life ==
Born and raised in Argentina, de la Vega is of Italian descent.

== Career statistics ==
As of 30 November 2024

Appearances and goals by club, season and competition
Club	Season	League			National Cup		League Cup		Continental		Other		Total	
Club	Season	Division	Apps	Goals	Apps	Goals	Apps	Goals	Apps	Goals	Apps	Goals	Apps	Goals
Lanús	2018–19	Primera División	10	0	—		3	1	—		—		13	1
Lanús	2019–20	Primera División	17	4	2	0	1	0	1	0	—		21	4
Lanús	2020–21 (Note: Soccerway counts Copa de la Liga Profesional appearances as league appearances.)	Primera División	6	0	0	0	—		8	1	—		14	1
Lanús	2021	Primera División	31	3	2	0	—		5	1	—		38	4
Lanús	2022	Primera División	1	0	—		—		0	0	—		1	0
Lanús	2023	Primera División	38	6	2	0	—		—		—		40	6
Lanús	Total		103	13	6	0	4	1	14	2	—		127	16
Seattle Sounders FC	2024	MLS	16	1	1	0	—		—		6	0	23	1
Seattle Sounders FC	2025	MLS	26	4	0	0	—		3	3	8	3	37	10
Career total			145	18	7	0	4	1	17	5	14	3	187	27

== Honours ==
Seattle Sounders FC

- Leagues Cup: 2025

Individual

- Leagues Cup Best Player: 2025
