= List of Minnesota United FC records and statistics =

Minnesota United FC is an American professional soccer team based in Saint Paul, Minnesota that competes in Major League Soccer (MLS).

This is a list of franchise records for Minnesota United, which dates from their inaugural MLS season in 2017 to present.

== Career Player records ==
=== Most appearances ===
#	Pos.	Name	Career	MLS	Playoffs	USOC	Leagues Cup	MiB	Total
1	DF	(New Zealand) **Michael Boxall**	2017-	257	13	14	7	3	294
2	MF	(United States) **Wil Trapp**	2021-	170	9	6	10	0	195
3	MF	(Finland) Robin Lod	2019-2025	158	13	7	4	3	185
4	MF	(United States) Hassani Dotson	2019-2025	149	11	8	5	3	176
5	FW	(South Africa) **Bongokuhle Hlongwane**	2022-	140	8	10	11	0	169
6	GK	(Canada) Dayne St. Clair	2019-2025	135	12	2	10	0	159
7	MF	(Honduras) Joseph Rosales	2021-2025	103	8	8	9	0	128
8	DF	(United States) Brent Kallman	2017-2023	114	1	8	1	0	124
9	DF	(United States) **D.J. Taylor**	2021-	99	1	9	8	0	117
10	FW	(Argentina) Franco Fragapane	2021-2024	96	2	6	6	0	110

As of August 29th, 2026

USOC = U.S. Open Cup; MiB = MLS is Back Tournament (Knockout Rounds)
Bold signifies current Minnesota United player

=== Top Goalscorers ===
#	Pos.	Name	Career	MLS	Playoffs	USOC	Leagues Cup	MiB	Total
1	MF	(Finland) Robin Lod	2019-2025	34	2	2	1	2	41
2	FW	(South Africa) **Bongokuhle Hlongwane**	2022-	24	0	2	9	0	35
3	FW	(Italy) **Kelvin Yeboah**	2024-	27	2	3	1	0	33
4	MF	(Argentina) Emanuel Reynoso	2020-2024	22	2	1	2	0	27
4	FW	(Colombia) Darwin Quintero	2018-2019	21	0	6	0	0	27
6	MF	(Trinidad and Tobago) Kevin Molino	2017-2020	21	4	0	0	0	25
7	FW	(United States) Christian Ramirez	2017-2018	21	0	0	0	0	21
8	MF	(United States) Ethan Finlay	2017-2021	19	0	1	0	0	20
8	FW	(Canada) Tani Oluwaseyi	2023-2025	18	0	0	2	0	20
10	DF	(United States) **Anthony Markanich**	2024-	15	1	1	2	0	19

As of August 29th, 2026

USOC = U.S. Open Cup; MiB = MLS is Back Tournament (Knockout Rounds)
Bold signifies current Minnesota United player

=== Top assists ===
#	Pos.	Name	Career	MLS	Playoffs	USOC	Leagues Cup	MiB	Total
1	MF	(Argentina) Emanuel Reynoso	2020-2024	33	7	0	3	0	43
2	MF	(Finland) Robin Lod	2019-2025	35	2	0	0	1	38
3	MF	(Argentina) **Joaquín Pereyra**	2024-	23	2	2	4	0	31
4	FW	(Colombia) Darwin Quintero	2018-2019	20	1	1	0	0	22
4	MF	(Argentina) Franco Fragapane	2021-2024	18	0	2	2	0	22
6	MF	(Trinidad and Tobago) Kevin Molino	2017-2020	18	0	2	0	1	21
7	MF	(Slovakia) Ján Greguš	2019-2021; 2023	18	1	1	0	0	20
7	MF	(Honduras) Joseph Rosales	2021-2025	14	1	3	2	0	20
9	FW	(South Africa) **Bongokuhle Hlongwane**	2022-	15	2	1	1	0	19
10	MF	(United States) Hassani Dotson	2019-2025	14	0	2	1	1	18

As of August 29th, 2026

USOC = U.S. Open Cup; MiB = MLS is Back Tournament
Bold signifies current Minnesota United player

=== Clean sheets ===
#	Name	Career	MLS	Playoffs	USOC	Leagues Cup	MiB	Total
1	(Canada) Dayne St. Clair	2019-2025	36	4	0	2	0	42
2	(United States) Tyler Miller	2020-2022	12	0	1	0	0	13
3	(Italy) Vito Mannone	2019	11	0	0	0	0	11
4	(United States) Bobby Shuttleworth	2017-2019	7	0	1	0	0	8
5	(United States) **Drake Callender**	2026-	5	0	0	0	0	5
6	(United States) **Alec Smir**	2024-	0	0	1	1	0	2
7	(Netherlands) **Wessel Speel**	2025-	0	0	1	0	0	1

As of August 29th, 2026

USOC = U.S. Open Cup; MiB = MLS is Back Tournament (Knockout Round)
Bold signifies current Minnesota United player

=== Saves & GAA ===
Name	Career	Shots	Saves	GP	GA	GAA	SV%
(Canada) Dayne St. Clair	2019-2025	756	536	159	221	1.39	70.9%
(United States) Bobby Shuttleworth	2017-2019	334	222	60	112	1.90	66.5%
(United States) Tyler Miller	2020-2022	180	132	43	49	1.15	73.3%
(Italy) Vito Mannone	2019	203	152	40	52	1.30	74.9%
(United States) **Drake Callender**	2026-	105	71	23	34	1.51	67.6%
(United States) Clint Irwin	2023-2024	74	46	12	28	2.27	62.2%
(United States) **Alec Smir**	2024-	37	24	10	14	1.46	64.9%
(United States) Matt Lampson	2018	50	31	9	20	2.22	62.0%
(Netherlands) **Wessel Speel**	2025-	18	10	5	8	1.89	55.6%
(Trinidad and Tobago) Greg Ranjitsingh	2020	22	15	3	8	2.67	68.2%
(Sweden) John Alvbåge	2017	15	5	3	10	4.07	33.3%
(United States) Eric Dick	2022-2023	4	2	1	2	2.00	50.0%
(United States) Patrick McLain	2017	8	4	1	4	4.00	50.0%

As of August 29th, 2026

includes Playoffs, U.S. Open Cup, Leagues Cup and MLS is Back Tournament knockout matches
Bold signifies current Minnesota United player

== Single Season Player Records ==
Note: MLS Regular Season stats only. Bold indicates current season in progress.

=== Top Goalscorers ===
#	Pos.	Name	Nation	Year	Goals
1	Forward	Christian Ramirez	United States	2017	14
1	Forward	**Kelvin Yeboah**	Italy	2026	14
3	Forward	Bongokuhle Hlongwane	South Africa	2024	11
3	Forward	Darwin Quintero	Colombia	2018	11
5	Forward	Tani Oluwaseyi	Canada	2025	10
5	Forward	Teemu Pukki	Finland	2023	10
5	Midfielder	Emanuel Reynoso	Argentina	2022	10
5	Forward	Darwin Quintero	Colombia	2019	10
9	Forward	Kelvin Yeboah	Italy	2025	9
9	Defender	Anthony Markanich	United States	2025	9
9	Forward	Luis Amarilla	Paraguay	2022	9
9	Midfielder	Robin Lod	Finland	2021	9
9	Midfielder	Kevin Molino	Trinidad and Tobago	2020	9

As of September 19th, 2026

=== Top assists ===
#	Pos.	Name	Nation	Year	Assists
1	Midfielder	Robin Lod	Finland	2024	15
1	Forward	Darwin Quintero	Colombia	2018	15
3	Midfielder	**Joaquín Pereyra**	Argentina	2026	12
4	Midfielder	Emanuel Reynoso	Argentina	2022	11
4	Midfielder	Ján Greguš	Slovakia	2019	11
4	Midfielder	Joaquín Pereyra	Argentina	2025	11
6	Midfielder	Joseph Rosales	Honduras	2024	10
6	Midfielder	Emanuel Reynoso	Argentina	2021	10
9	Forward	Franco Fragapane	Argentina	2021	9
9	Midfielder	Kevin Molino	Trinidad and Tobago	2017	9

As of September 19th, 2026

=== Clean sheets ===
#	Name	Nation	Year	Clean Sheets
1	Tyler Miller	United States	2021	11
1	Vito Mannone	Italy	2019	11
3	Dayne St. Clair	Canada	2025	10
4	Dayne St. Clair	Canada	2023	8
5	Dayne St. Clair	Canada	2024	7
6	Dayne St. Clair	Canada	2020	6
7	**Drake Callender**	United States	2026	5
7	Dayne St. Clair	Canada	2022	5
7	Bobby Shuttleworth	United States	2017	5
10	Bobby Shuttleworth	United States	2018	2

As of August 29th, 2026

== Coaching records ==
Coach	From	To	Record				
Coach	From	To	G	W	D	L	Win %
(England) Adrian Heath	November 29, 2016	October 6, 2023	251	92	57	102	36.65
(England) Sean McAuley (Interim)	July 8, 2023	July 8, 2023	1	0	0	1	0.00
(England) Sean McAuley (Interim)	October 6, 2023	January 5, 2024	2	1	0	1	50.00
(New Zealand) Cameron Knowles (Interim)	January 5, 2024	March 9, 2024	3	2	1	0	66.67
(Wales) Eric Ramsay	February 26, 2024	January 11, 2026	81	34	21	26	41.98
(New Zealand) **Cameron Knowles**	January 12, 2026	Present	27	8	10	9	29.63
Total			365	137	89	139	37.53

As of August 27th, 2026

Note: includes US Open Cup, Leagues Cup, MLS is Back knockout round and MLS Cup results
Sean McAuley managed the July 8th, 2023 match against Austin FC while Adrian Heath was suspended due to Yellow Card accumulation.
Bold signifies current Minnesota United coach

== Club Captains ==
Pos.	Name	Nation	Years
Defender	Vadim Demidov	Norway	2017
Defender	Francisco Calvo	Costa Rica	2017-2019
Midfielder	Osvaldo Alonso	Cuba	2019-2021
Midfielder	**Wil Trapp**	United States	2022-2023
Defender	**Michael Boxall**	New Zealand	2024-

== Designated Players ==
Pos.	Name	Nation	DP Status	Ref
Forward	Darwin Quintero	Colombia	2018-2019	
Forward	Ángelo Rodríguez	Colombia	2018-2019	
Midfielder	Ján Greguš	Slovakia	2019-2021	
Midfielder	Thomás Chacón	Uruguay	2019-2021	
Midfielder	Emanuel Reynoso	Argentina	2020-2024	
Forward	Adrien Hunou	France	2021-2022	
Forward	Luis Amarilla	Paraguay	2022-2023	
Forward	Ménder García	Colombia	2022-2023	
Forward	Teemu Pukki	Finland	2023-2024	
Forward	**Kelvin Yeboah**	Italy	2024-	
Midfielder	**Joaquín Pereyra**	Argentina	2024-	

As of August 25th, 2024

Bold signifies current Minnesota United player

== Homegrown Players ==
Pos.	Name	Nation	HG Status	Ref
Goalkeeper	Fred Emmings	Luxembourg	2020-2023	
Forward	Patrick Weah	United States	2021-2024	
Midfielder	Aziel Jackson	United States	2021-2022	
Defender	**Devin Padelford**	United States	2022-	
Forward	**Darius Randell**	Liberia	2025-	
Goalkeeper	**Kayne Rizvanovich**	United States	2026-	

As of January 17th, 2026

Bold signifies current Minnesota United player
