= 2026 Minnesota United FC season =

Minnesota United FC
2026 season
- Owner: Bill McGuire
- Head coach: Cameron Knowles
- Stadium: Allianz Field
- Major League Soccer: Conference: 9th Overall: 15th
- MLS Cup Playoffs: TBD
- U.S. Open Cup: Round of 16
- Leagues Cup: Phase One
- Top goalscorer: League: Kelvin Yeboah (11); All: Kelvin Yeboah (11)
- Highest home attendance: 19,838 vs RSL (5/23, MLS)
- Lowest home attendance: 11,453 vs AFC (8/11, LC)
- Average home league attendance: 19,330
- Biggest win: 5-1 at SJ (8/22, MLS)
- Biggest defeat: 0-6 at VAN (3/15, MLS)
Home colors	Away colors	Third colors

The 2026 Minnesota United FC season is the club's seventeenth season of existence, and tenth in Major League Soccer. Their season began on February 21st, 2026, where they faced Austin FC in Austin, TX. The club plays its home matches at Allianz Field in Saint Paul, Minnesota. The Loons will try to qualify for the MLS Cup Playoffs after making the playoffs the previous two years. The club announced on January 11th that head coach Eric Ramsay left the club to become the head coach of West Bromwich Albion F.C.. On January 12th, the club announced Cameron Knowles as the new head coach.

== Technical staff ==
As of August 25th, 2026

Position	Name
Chief Soccer Officer and Sporting Director	Hank Stebbins (Interim)
Head coach	(New Zealand) Cameron Knowles
Assistant Coach	(United States) Josh Wolff
Assistant Coach	(United States) Danny Cruz
Assistant Coach	(United States) Tom Soehn
Goalkeeping Coach	(Brazil) Christiano Costa

== Roster ==
As of August 1st, 2026

No.	Name	Nationality	Position(s)	Date of birth (age)	Height	Signed In	Signed from	Transfer Fee	Contract start	Contract Length	Ref.
Goalkeepers
1	Alec Smir	JOR	GK	April 13, 1999 (age 27)	6 ft 2 in	2024	(United States) Minnesota United FC 2	Free	2024	1+2	
12	Drake Callender	USA	GK	October 7, 1997 (age 29)	6 ft 3 in	2025	(United States) Charlotte FC	$450K+	2023	3+1	
94	Kayne Rizvanovich (HGP)	USA	GK	October 26, 2007 (age 19)	6 ft 4 in	2026	(United States) Minnesota United FC 2	Free	2026	2+2	
96	Wessel Speel (on loan at Almere City FC)	NED	GK	October 17, 2001 (age 25)	6 ft 7 in	2025	(United States) Minnesota United FC 2	Free	2026	2+1	
Defenders
2	Devin Padelford (HGP)	USA	DF	January 3, 2003 (age 23)	6 ft 0 in	2022	(United States) MNUFC Academy	Free	2022	3+2	
3	Kyle Duncan	JAM	DF	August 8, 1997 (age 29)	5 ft 10 in	2026	(United States) New York Red Bulls	Free	2026	1+0.5	
5	Nicolás Romero (INT) (U22)	ARG	DF	November 28, 2003 (age 22)	6 ft 1 in	2025	(Argentina) Atlético Tucumán	$2M	2025	3+1	
13	Anthony Markanich	USA	DF	December 26, 1999 (age 26)	6 ft 1 in	2024	(United States) St. Louis City SC	$50K+	2025	4+1	
15	Michael Boxall	NZL	DF	August 18, 1988 (age 38)	6 ft 2 in	2017	(South Africa) SuperSport United	Free	2024	2+1	
19	Britton Fischer (on loan at Hartford Athletic)	USA	DF	February 25, 2004 (age 22)	6 ft 4 in	2026	(United States) Minnesota United FC 2	Free	2026	1+2	
23	Morris Duggan	GER	DF	October 24, 2000 (age 26)	6 ft 4 in	2024	(United States) Marshall Thundering Herd	Draft	2026	4+1	
27	DJ Taylor	USA	DF	August 26, 1997 (age 29)	5 ft 9 in	2021	(United States) North Carolina FC	Free	2024	2+1	
28	Jefferson Díaz	COL	DF	December 5, 2000 (age 25)	6 ft 1 in	2024	(Colombia) Deportivo Cali	$700K	2026	5+1	
33	Kieran Chandler	USA	DF	June 9, 2005 (age 21)	5 ft 9 in	2025	(United States) Minnesota United FC 2	Free	2025	2+2	
67	Carlos Harvey	PAN	DF	February 3, 2000 (age 26)	6 ft 1 in	2024	(United States) Phoenix Rising FC	Undisclosed	2025	4+1	
Midfielders
6	Peter Stroud (HGP)	USA	MF	April 23, 2002 (age 24)	5 ft 10 in	2026	(United States) New York Red Bulls	$475K	2023	3+2	
7	Dominik Fitz (on loan at Wolfsberger AC)	AUT	MF	June 16, 1999 (age 27)	5 ft 9 in	2025	FK Austria Wien	Undisclosed	2025	5+1	
16	Aziel Jackson (on loan from Jagiellonia Białystok)	USA	MF	October 25, 2001 (age 25)	5 ft 9 in	2026	(Poland) Jagiellonia Białystok	Loan	2026	1	
20	Wil Trapp	USA	MF	January 15, 1993 (age 33)	5 ft 8 in	2021	(United States) Inter Miami CF	Free	2025	1+1	
24	Julian Gressel	USA	MF	December 16, 1993 (age 32)	6 ft 0 in	2025	(United States) Inter Miami CF	Waivers	2024	3+1	
25	Nectarios Triantis (INT) (U22)	GRE	MF	May 11, 2003 (age 23)	6 ft 3 in	2025	(England) Sunderland A.F.C.	Undisclosed	2025	5+1	
26	Joaquín Pereyra (DP)	ARG	MF	December 1, 1998 (age 27)	6 ft 1 in	2024	(Argentina) Atlético Tucumán	Undisclosed	2025	4+1	
30	Owen Gene (INT) (U22)	FRA	MF	March 19, 2003 (age 23)	6 ft 1 in	2025	(France) Amiens SC	$2M	2025	3+1	
	Jeong Ho-yeon (on loan at Suwon Samsung Bluewings)	KOR	MF	September 28, 2000 (age 26)	5 ft 11 in	2025	(South Korea) Gwangju FC	$1M	2025	3+1	
Forwards
8	Tomás Chancalay	ARG	FW	January 1, 1999 (age 27)	5 ft 10 in	2025	(United States) New England Revolution	$100K	2025	2+1	
9	Kelvin Yeboah (DP) (INT)	ITA	FW	May 6, 2000 (age 26)	6 ft 0 in	2024	(Italy) Genoa CFC	$3.2M	2024	4+1	
14	Kenyel Michel (on loan at Alajuelense)	CRC	FW	September 17, 2004 (age 22)	5 ft 7 in	2025	(Costa Rica) Alajuelense	Undisclosed	2025	3+1	
17	Darius Randell (HGP)	LBR	FW	August 25, 2007 (age 19)	6 ft 0 in	2025	(United States) Minnesota United FC 2	Free	2025	2+2	
18	Mauricio González (INT) (U22)	COL	FW	September 15, 2004 (age 22)	5 ft 10 in	2026	(Colombia) Internacional F.C. de Palmira	Undisclosed	2026	4+1	
21	Bongokuhle Hlongwane	RSA	FW	June 20, 2000 (age 26)	6 ft 1 in	2022	(South Africa) Maritzburg United F.C.	$500K	2025	3+1	
22	Marcus Caldeira	CAN	FW	October 14, 2004 (age 22)	6 ft 2 in	2026	(United States) West Virginia	Draft	2026	1+2	
29	Mamadou Dieng (INT)	SEN	FW	February 4, 2004 (age 22)	6 ft 2 in	2025	(United States) Hartford Athletic	Undisclosed	2025	2+2	
99	Jordan Adebayo-Smith	USA	FW	January 11, 2001 (age 25)	5 ft 11 in	2024	(United States) New England Revolution II	$125K	2024	3+1	
	Maurice Malone	GER	FW	August 17, 2000 (age 26)	6 ft 2 in	2026	(Austria) SK Sturm Graz	$1.65M	2026	4+1	

== Transfers ==
=== Transfers in ===
Date	Position	No.	Player	From club	Notes	Ref.
December 16, 2025	MF	6	(United States) Peter Stroud	(United States) New York Red Bulls	Trade	
December 17, 2025	DF	19	(United States) Britton Fischer	(United States) Minnesota United FC 2	First Team Contract	
December 26, 2025	MF	8	(Argentina) Tomás Chancalay	(United States) New England Revolution	Trade	
December 29, 2025	GK	12	(United States) Drake Callender	(United States) Charlotte FC	Trade	
January 16, 2026	GK	94	(United States) Kayne Rizvanovich	(United States) Minnesota United FC 2	First Team Contract	
January 20, 2026	MF	18	(Colombia) Mauricio González	(Colombia) Internacional F.C. de Palmira	Transfer	
January 28, 2026	FW	22	(Canada) Marcus Caldeira	(United States) West Virginia	2024 MLS SuperDraft Pick	
February 6, 2026	MF	10	(Colombia) James Rodríguez	(Mexico) Club León	Free Transfer	
February 13, 2026	DF	3	(United States) Kyle Duncan	(United States) New York Red Bulls	Free Transfer	
August 24, 2026	FW		(Germany) Maurice Malone	(Austria) SK Sturm Graz	Transfer	

=== MLS SuperDraft ===
Round	Pick	Player	Position	Previous club	Status	Ref
1	23	(United States) Jaylinn Mitchell	Forward	SMU		
2	52	(United States) Bardia Hormozi	Forward	Princeton		
3	67	(United States) Aiden Bengard	Defender	CSUF		
3	83	(United States) Michal Mroz	Goalkeeper	Evansville		

=== Transfers out ===
Date	Position	No.	Player	To club	Notes	Ref.
November 26, 2025	DF	12	(United States) Kipp Keller	(United States) New Mexico United	Option Declined	
November 26, 2025	MF	17	(Finland) Robin Lod	(United States) Chicago Fire FC	Option Declined	
November 26, 2025	FW	19	(England) Samuel Shashoua	(United States) Birmingham Legion FC	Option Declined	
November 26, 2025	MF	31	(United States) Hassani Dotson	(United States) Seattle Sounders FC	Out of Contract	
November 26, 2025	MF	90	(Togo) Loïc Mesanvi	(United States) Indy Eleven	Option Declined	
November 26, 2025	GK	97	(Canada) Dayne St. Clair	(United States) Inter Miami CF	Out of Contract	
December 23, 2025	MF	8	(Honduras) Joseph Rosales	(United States) Austin FC	Trade	
July 9, 2026	DF		(Slovakia) Matúš Kmeť	(Czech Republic) FC Baník Ostrava	Transfer	
July 21, 2026	MF	10	(Colombia) James Rodríguez	Free Agent	Option Declined	

=== Loans in ===
Start date	End date	Position	No.	Player	From club	Notes	Ref.
August 13, 2026	End of 2026 Season	MF	16	(United States) Aziel Jackson	(Poland) Jagiellonia Białystok	Option to Buy	

=== Loans out ===
Start date	End date	Position	No.	Player	To club	Notes	Ref.
July 23, 2025	End of 2026 Season	GK	96	(Netherlands) Wessel Speel	(Republic of Ireland) Shelbourne F.C.	Extending previous loan Recalled before loan ended	
January 24, 2026	End of 2026 Season	MF	22	(South Korea) Jeong Ho-yeon	(South Korea) Suwon Samsung Bluewings	Option to Buy	
February 3, 2026	June 2026	DF	18	(Slovakia) Matúš Kmeť	(Slovakia) FC DAC 1904 Dunajská Streda	Option to Buy	
February 26, 2026	April 7, 2026	GK	94	(United States) Kayne Rizvanovich	(United States) Brooklyn FC	Recalled before loan ended	
March 3, 2026	End of 2026 Season	DF	19	(United States) Britton Fischer	(United States) Hartford Athletic		
July 27, 2026	End of 2026 Season	FW	14	(Costa Rica) Kenyel Michel	(Costa Rica) Alajuelense		
July 31, 2026	End of 2026-27 Season	GK	96	(Netherlands) Wessel Speel	(Netherlands) Almere City FC		
August 27, 2026	May 2027	MF	7	(Austria) Dominik Fitz	(Austria) Wolfsberger AC	Option to Buy	

== Friendlies ==
Win Draw Loss

February 7 Preseason	Minnesota United FC	3–0	Sporting Kansas City	Indio, California
3:30 PM CT	Markanich 35', 68'; Yeboah 57'			Stadium: Empire Polo Club
Note: Coachella Valley Invitational

February 11 Preseason	Minnesota United FC	0–0	D.C. United	Indio, California
2:30 PM CT				Stadium: Empire Polo Club
Note: Coachella Valley Invitational

February 14 Preseason	Minnesota United FC	1–2	Charlotte FC	Indio, California
12:00 PM CT	Hlongwane		Toklomati	Stadium: Empire Polo Club
Note: Coachella Valley Invitational

== Competitions ==
=== MLS regular season ===
==== Standings ====
===== Overall =====
Overall MLS standings table
Pos	Team	Pld	W	L	T	GF	GA	GD	Pts
17	FC Cincinnati	34	12	12	10	67	75	−8	46
18	Real Salt Lake	34	13	15	6	53	52	+1	45
19	Minnesota United FC	34	11	12	11	56	58	−2	44
20	LA Galaxy	34	11	12	11	50	57	−7	44
21	Colorado Rapids	34	12	15	7	47	50	−3	43

Source: MLS
Rules for classification: 1) points; 2) total wins; 3) total goal differential; 4) total goals scored; 5) fewer disciplinary points; 6) away goal differential; 7) away goals scored; 8) home goals differential; 9) home goals scored; 10) coin toss (2 clubs tied) or drawing of lots (≥3 clubs tied)

===== Western Conference =====
MLS Western Conference table (2026)
Pos	Team	Pld	W	L	T	GF	GA	GD	Pts	Qualification
3	St. Louis City SC	34	15	10	9	59	48	+11	54	Qualification for round one
4	San Jose Earthquakes	34	14	10	10	57	51	+6	52	Qualification for round one
5	Houston Dynamo FC	34	14	11	9	43	43	0	51	Qualification for round one
6	Los Angeles FC	34	12	11	11	52	40	+12	47	Qualification for round one
7	Portland Timbers	34	13	14	7	62	61	+1	46	Qualification for round one
8	Seattle Sounders FC	34	12	12	10	44	46	−2	46	Qualification for the wild card round
9	Real Salt Lake	34	13	15	6	53	52	+1	45	Qualification for the wild card round
10	Minnesota United FC	34	11	12	11	56	58	−2	44	
11	LA Galaxy	34	11	12	11	50	57	−7	44	
12	Colorado Rapids	34	12	15	7	47	50	−3	43	
13	San Diego FC	34	9	14	11	57	63	−6	38	
14	Austin FC	34	8	16	10	42	65	−23	34	
15	Sporting Kansas City	34	7	22	5	40	81	−41	26	

Source: MLS
Rules for classification: 1) points; 2) total wins; 3) total goal differential; 4) total goals scored; 5) fewer disciplinary points; 6) away goal differential; 7) away goals scored; 8) home goals differential; 9) home goals scored; 10) coin toss (2 clubs tied) or drawing of lots (≥3 clubs tied)

==== Results summary ====
Overall								Home						Away					
Pld	Pts	W	L	T	GF	GA	GD	W	L	T	GF	GA	GD	W	L	T	GF	GA	GD
34	44	11	12	11	56	58	−2	5	5	7	25	22	+3	6	7	4	31	36	−5

Last updated: Complete
Source: MLS Results
Pld = Matches played; Pts = Points; W = Matches won; T = Matches tied; L = Matches lost; GF = Goals for; GA = Goals against; GD = Goal difference

==== Regular season ====
February 21 1	Austin FC	2–2	Minnesota United FC	Austin, Texas
7:30 PM CT	Hines-Ike 7'; Sánchez (yellow card) 38'; Uzuni 76'	Report	Trapp (yellow card) 25'; Duggan 40'; Yeboah 90'	Stadium: Q2 Stadium; Attendance: 20,738; Referee: Armando Villarreal

February 28 2	Minnesota United FC	1–0	FC Cincinnati	St. Paul, Minnesota
3:30 PM CT	Duggan (yellow card) 59'; Yeboah 66'; Díaz (yellow card) 90+6'	Report		Stadium: Allianz Field; Attendance: 19,609; Referee: Marcos de Oliveira

March 7 3	Nashville SC	3–1	Minnesota United FC	Nashville, Tennessee
7:30 PM CT	Surridge 26', 47'; Espinoza 33'; Palacios (yellow card) 81'	Report	Triantis 35'; Gressel (yellow card) 89'	Stadium: Geodis Park; Attendance: 24,387; Referee: Pierre-Luc Lauziere

March 15 4	Vancouver Whitecaps FC	6–0	Minnesota United FC	Vancouver, British Columbia
3:30 PM CT	Berhalter 8' (pen.); White 13', 54' (pen.); Laborda 23'; Sabbi 43'; Cubas (yellow card) 64'; Sabaly 74'	Report	Díaz (yellow card) 45+4'; Taylor (yellow card) 74'	Stadium: BC Place; Attendance: 23,885; Referee: Ricardo Fierro
Note: Rescheduled from March 14, due to the Whitecaps participation in the CONCACAF Champions Cup Round of 16.

March 22 5	Minnesota United FC	0−0	Seattle Sounders FC	St. Paul, Minnesota
1:30 PM CT	Díaz (yellow card) 47'	Report	Petković (yellow card) 38'; Lopez (yellow card) 38'; Ragen (yellow card) 67'	Stadium: Allianz Field; Attendance: 19,637; Referee: Jon Freemon

April 4 6	LA Galaxy	1–2	Minnesota United FC	Carson, California
9:30 PM CT	Reus 57'; Wynder (yellow card) 70'; Garcés (yellow card) 90+8'	Report	Markanich (yellow card) 44', (goal) 51'; Duggan (yellow card) 64'; Yeboah 67'; Duncan (yellow card) 90+8'	Stadium: Dignity Health Sports Park; Attendance: 22,447; Referee: Malik Badawi

April 11 7	San Diego FC	1–2	Minnesota United FC	San Diego, California
9:30 PM CT	Bombino 7'; McVey (yellow card) 12' (yellow-red card) 46'; Verhoeven (yellow card) 30'	Report	Duncan 15'; Yeboah 40'; Pereyra (yellow card) 69'	Stadium: Snapdragon Stadium; Attendance: 23,394; Referee: Victor Rivas

April 18 8	Minnesota United FC	2–0	Portland Timbers	St. Paul, Minnesota
7:30 PM CT	Chancalay 16' (yellow card) 26'; Yeboah 60'; Triantis (yellow card) 73'	Report		Stadium: Allianz Field; Attendance: 19,617; Referee: Nabil Bensalah

April 22 9	FC Dallas	0–1	Minnesota United FC	Frisco, Texas
7:30 PM CT	Moreno (yellow card) 41'; Norris (yellow card) 57'		Markanich (yellow card) 4', (goal) 32'; Duggan (yellow card) 50'; Romero (yellow card) 73'	Stadium: Toyota Stadium; Attendance: 11,004; Referee: Allen Chapman

April 25 10	Minnesota United FC	0–1	Los Angeles FC	St. Paul, Minnesota
12:30 PM CT	Yeboah (yellow card) 53'	Report	Martínez 9'; Tillman (yellow card) 52'; Hollingshead (yellow card) 86'; Palencia (yellow card) 90+5'	Stadium: Allianz Field; Attendance: 19,710; Referee: Guido Gonzales Jr.

May 2 11	Columbus Crew	2–3	Minnesota United FC	Columbus, Ohio
6:30 PM CT	Arfsten (yellow card) 12'; Habroune 31'; Picard 56'; Camacho (yellow card) 72'	Report	Duncan (yellow card) 24'; Yeboah 59', 66'; Markanich 74'; Díaz (yellow card) 84'	Stadium: ScottsMiracle-Gro Field; Attendance: 18,904; Referee: Sergii Boiko

May 10 12	Minnesota United FC	2–2	Austin FC	St. Paul, Minnesota
6:00 PM CT	Díaz (yellow card) 29'; Triantis (yellow card) 40'; Chancalay (yellow card) 42'; Pereyra (yellow card) 45+12', (goal) 77'; Gene (yellow card) 47'; Markanich 69'	Report	Uzuni 14' (pen.); Torres (yellow card) 45+2'; Gallagher (yellow card) 45+12'; Ramirez 79'	Stadium: Allianz Field; Attendance: 18,749; Referee: Chris Penso

May 13 13	Minnesota United FC	0–1	Colorado Rapids	St. Paul, Minnesota
7:30 PM CT	Duggan (yellow card) 1'; Yeboah (yellow card) 21'; Díaz (yellow card) 76'; Chancalay (yellow card) 83'; Trapp (yellow card) 84'	Report	R. Navarro 26' (yellow card) 86'; Thompson (yellow card) 69'	Stadium: Allianz Field; Attendance: 18,458; Referee: Elijio Arreguin

May 16 14	New England Revolution	2–1	Minnesota United FC	Foxborough, Massachusetts
6:30 PM CT	Gil 5' (pen.); Langoni 49'; Raines (yellow card) 70'; Yow (yellow card) 90+3'	Report	Yeboah 26' (pen.); Romero (yellow card) 71'	Stadium: Gillette Stadium; Attendance: 26,385; Referee: Rosendo Mendoza

May 23 15	Minnesota United FC	1–1	Real Salt Lake	St. Paul, Minnesota
7:30 PM CT	González 90+3'	Report	Booth 22'; Yedlin (yellow card) 29'; Caliskan (yellow card) 75'	Stadium: Allianz Field; Attendance: 19,838; Referee: Tori Penso

July 22 16	Sporting Kansas City	2–1	Minnesota United FC	Kansas City, Kansas
7:30 PM CT	Joveljić 28', (yellow card) 74'; Capita (yellow card) 45+2'; García 54'	Report	Duncan (yellow card) 21'; Pereyra (yellow card) 56'; Padelford 75'; Hlongwane (yellow card) 84'	Stadium: Sporting Park; Attendance: 15,378; Referee: Matthew Corrigan

July 25 17	Minnesota United FC	0–0	Vancouver Whitecaps FC	St. Paul, Minnesota
7:30 PM CT	Dieng (yellow card) 17'; Boxall (yellow card) 88'	Report	Badwal (yellow card) 24'	Stadium: Allianz Field; Attendance: 18,845; Referee: Lorenzo Hernandez

August 1 18	Minnesota United FC	1–1	San Diego FC	St. Paul, Minnesota
7:30 PM CT	Chancalay 3'; Callender (yellow card) 64'	Report	Dreyer 64' (pen.), (yellow card) 64'	Stadium: Allianz Field; Attendance: 19,607; Referee: Timothy Ford

August 15 19	Real Salt Lake	1–1	Minnesota United FC	Sandy, Utah
8:30 PM CT	Booth (yellow card) 13'; Rodrigues (yellow card) 56'; Solans 82'; Spierings (yellow card) 90+4'	Report	Díaz (yellow card) 32'; Pereyra 89'	Stadium: America First Field; Attendance: 20,137; Referee: Rubiel Vazquez

August 19 20	Minnesota United FC	1–2	Atlanta United FC	St. Paul, Minnesota
7:30 PM CT	Boxall (yellow card) 29'; Pereyra (yellow card) 32'; Markanich 58'; Chancalay (yellow card) 75'; Gene (yellow card) 87'	Report	Alonso (yellow card) 19'; Jacob 37'; Gill (yellow card) 46'; Sanchez (yellow card) 57'; Muyumba 78'	Stadium: Allianz Field; Attendance: 19,210; Referee: Joshua Encarnación

August 22 21	San Jose Earthquakes	1–5	Minnesota United FC	San Jose, California
9:30 PM CT	Werner 4' (pen.); Kikanović (yellow card) 85'	Report	Pereyra 10'; Yeboah 40', 44'; Caldeira 65'; González 86'	Stadium: PayPal Park; Attendance: 14,517; Referee: Jair Marrufo

August 29 22	Minnesota United FC	3–3	Orlando City SC	St. Paul, Minnesota
7:30 PM CT	Markanich (yellow card) 32', (goal) 74'; Boxall (yellow card) 66'; Caldeira 71'; Yeboah 75'	Report	Dike 28'; Griezmann (yellow card) 54', (goal) 64'; Pašalić (yellow card) 90+2'; Spicer 90+3'	Stadium: Allianz Field; Attendance: 19,352; Referee: Allen Chapman

September 5 23	Portland Timbers	5–4	Minnesota United FC	Portland, Oregon
9:30 PM CT	Janssen 11' (pen.), 26', 55'; Callender 20' (o.g.); Surman (yellow card) 45+7'; Velde 71'	Report	Boxall (yellow card) 24'; Caldeira 32', 50'; Markanich 37'; Díaz (yellow card) 74'; Chancalay 90+2'; Duggan (yellow card) 90+6'	Stadium: Providence Park; Attendance: 20,632; Referee: Filip Dujic

September 9 24	Minnesota United FC	1–2	FC Dallas	St. Paul, Minnesota
7:30 PM CT	Triantis (yellow card) 69'; Yeboah 73'; Gene (yellow card) 89'	Report	Urhoghide (yellow card) 7'; Kaick 62'; Ramiro (yellow card) 83'; Moreno 84'	Stadium: Allianz Field; Attendance: 18,109; Referee: Ricardo Fierro

September 12 25	St. Louis City SC	4–2	Minnesota United FC	St. Louis, Missouri
7:30 PM CT	Edelman 18'; Holse 22'; R. Navarro 38', 57' (pen.)	Report	Chancalay 5'; Boxall (yellow card) 47'; Yeboah 61' (pen.); Duncan (yellow card) 64' (red card) 80'	Stadium: Energizer Park; Attendance: 22,423; Referee: Ricardo Montero

September 19 26	Minnesota United FC	2–3	LA Galaxy	St. Paul, Minnesota
7:30 PM CT	Caldeira 23'; Yeboah 30' (pen.); Harvey (yellow card) 69'	Report	Ruiz 12'; Taylor (yellow card) 26'; Klauss 76'; Reus 80'	Stadium: Allianz Field; Attendance: 19,634; Referee: Sergii Demianchuk

September 26 27	Seattle Sounders FC	3–1	Minnesota United FC	Seattle, Washington
7:30 PM CT	Morris 16'; Dotson 35', (yellow card) 71'; Arriola 83'; Hawkins (yellow card) 86'	Report	Díaz (yellow card) 28'; Markanich 57'; Gene (yellow card) 58'	Stadium: Lumen Field; Attendance: 32,331; Referee: Nabil Bensalah

October 10 28	Minnesota United FC	2–2	Houston Dynamo FC	St. Paul, Minnesota
7:30 PM CT	Yeboah 48'; González (yellow card) 66'; Caldeira 78'; Trapp (yellow card) 82'	Report	Foster 18'; McGuire 90+2'	Stadium: Allianz Field; Attendance: 19,351; Referee: Marcos de Oliveira

October 14 29	Colorado Rapids	2–2	Minnesota United FC	Commerce City, Colorado
8:30 PM CT	Yapi (yellow card) 11', (goal) 45+1'; Abu Farki (red card) 68'; Minoungou 74'; M. Navarro (yellow card) 79'	Report	Yeboah 52'; Gene (yellow card) 88'	Stadium: Dick's Sporting Goods Park; Attendance: 14,506; Referee: Victor Rivas

October 17 30	Minnesota United FC	3–2	St. Louis City SC	St. Paul, Minnesota
3:30 PM CT	Jackson (yellow card) 24', (goal) 49'; Yeboah 68'; Caldeira 86'; Díaz (yellow card) 90'	Report	Navarro 4'; Perez (yellow card) 26'; Jeong Sang-bin 10', (yellow card) 51'	Stadium: Allianz Field; Attendance: 19,616; Referee: Ramy Touchan

October 24 31	Houston Dynamo FC	0–0	Minnesota United FC	Houston, Texas
7:30 PM CT	Carlos (yellow card) 9'; Bouzat (yellow card) 30'; Ennali (yellow card) 34'	Report		Stadium: Shell Energy Stadium; Attendance: 17,377; Referee: Tori Penso

October 28 32	Minnesota United FC	3–1	Sporting Kansas City	St. Paul, Minnesota
7:30 PM CT	Yeboah (yellow card) 45+4', (goal) 88'; González (yellow card) 59', (goal) 76'; Markanich (yellow card) 61', (goal) 72'; Valerius (yellow card) 71'	Report	Calheira 31'	Stadium: Allianz Field; Attendance: 18,354; Referee: Serhiy Boyko

November 1 33	Los Angeles FC	1–3	Minnesota United FC	Los Angeles, California
3:30 PM CT	Igor Jesus (yellow card) 45+1'; Segura (yellow card) 58'; Boyd (yellow card) 84'	Report	Pereyra 29', 81', (yellow card) 45+5'; Valerius 34'; Díaz (yellow card) 60'; Duggan (yellow card) 74'; Triantis (yellow card) 90+3'	Stadium: BMO Stadium; Attendance: 22,168; Referee: Joe Dickerson

November 7 34	Minnesota United FC	3–1	San Jose Earthquakes	St. Paul, Minnesota
6:00 PM CT	Gene (yellow card) 54'; Chancalay 58', (yellow card) 87'; Duggan (yellow card) 60'; Gunn 82' (o.g.); Triantis 90+5'	Report	Vieira (yellow card) 47'; Ricketts (yellow card) 68'; Judd (yellow card) 69'	Stadium: Allianz Field; Attendance: 19,714; Referee: Alexis da Silva

=== U.S. Open Cup ===
April 14 Round of 32	Sacramento Republic FC (California)	0–0 (8–9 p)	Minnesota United FC	Sacramento, California
9:00 PM CT	Crisostomo (yellow card) 62'; Vitiello (yellow card) 90'; Essel (yellow card) 112'; Ajago (yellow card) 119'	Report	Pereyra (yellow card) 105'; Markanich (yellow card) 117'	Stadium: Heart Health Park; Attendance: 7,513; Referee: Robert Vincze
	Penalties
	Wanner (penalty scored); Benítez (penalty scored); Essel (penalty missed); Rivas (penalty scored); Cambridge (penalty missed); Ajago (penalty scored); A. Rodríguez (penalty scored); Desmond (penalty scored); Kleemann (penalty scored); Ukaegbu (penalty scored); Vitiello (penalty missed); Wanner (penalty missed)		(penalty scored) Pereyra; (penalty scored) Chancalay; (penalty missed) Gene; (penalty scored) Triantis; (penalty missed) Markanich; (penalty scored) Trapp; (penalty scored) Harvey; (penalty scored) Diaz; (penalty scored) González; (penalty scored) Padelford; (penalty missed) Smir; (penalty scored) Pereyra

April 28 Round of 16	San Jose Earthquakes (California)	4–2	Minnesota United FC	San Jose, California
9:00 PM CT	Leroux 15', 73'; Vieira (yellow card) 27'; Judd (yellow card) 45'; Padelford 68' (o.g.); Tsakiris 75'	Report	Vieira 59' (o.g.); Chancalay 63'	Stadium: PayPal Park; Referee: Lorenzo Hernandez

=== Leagues Cup ===
==== Phase One ====
August 4 1	Minnesota United FC (United States)	1–2	(Mexico) Juárez	St. Paul, Minnesota
7:30 PM CT	Chancalay 34'; Markanich (yellow card) 68'; Padelford (yellow card) 69'	Report	Castilho 22'; Estupiñán 38'; Murillo (yellow card) 76'; Ayón (yellow card) 90+1'	Stadium: Allianz Field; Attendance: 16,022; Referee: Alyssa Pennington

August 7 2	UANL (Mexico)	0–0 (4–2 p)	(United States) Minnesota United FC	St. Paul, Minnesota
8:00 PM CT	Garza (yellow card) 43'	Report	Pereyra (yellow card) 13'; Gene (yellow card) 80'; González (yellow card) 81'	Stadium: Allianz Field; Attendance: 16,705; Referee: José Carlos Rivero
	Penalties
	Brunetta (penalty scored); Gorriarán (penalty scored); Araújo (penalty missed); Herrera (penalty scored); Lainez (penalty scored)		(penalty missed) Yeboah; (penalty missed) Pereyra; (penalty scored) Harvey; (penalty scored) Trapp

August 11 3	Minnesota United FC (United States)	3–1	(Mexico) Atlante	St. Paul, Minnesota
7:30 PM CT	Chandler (yellow card) 37'; Padelford (yellow card) 44'; González 59'; Gressel (yellow card) 63'; Pereyra 75', 87'	Report	Quirós (yellow card) 11'; Padelford 32' (o.g.); Julio (yellow card) 69'	Stadium: Allianz Field; Attendance: 11,453; Referee: Keylor Herrera
Note: Game was originally scheduled against Mazatlán until the team was disbanded and replaced by Atlante.

== Statistics ==
=== Appearances ===
Last updated August 29th, 2026.

No.	Pos.	Nat.	Player	MLS	U.S. Open Cup	Leagues Cup	MLS Cup Playoffs	Season total
1	GK	(United States)	Alec Smir	1	1	3	0	5
2	DF	(United States)	Devin Padelford	16	2	2	0	20
3	DF	(United States)	Kyle Duncan	18	1	2	0	21
5	DF	(Argentina)	Nicolás Romero	9	1	0	0	10
6	MF	(United States)	Peter Stroud	1	0	0	0	1
7	MF	(Austria)	Dominik Fitz	1	0	1	0	2
8	FW	(Argentina)	Tomás Chancalay	22	2	3	0	27
9	FW	(Italy)	Kelvin Yeboah	21	1	3	0	25
10	MF	(Colombia)	James Rodríguez	6	2	0	0	8
12	GK	(United States)	Drake Callender	22	1	0	0	23
13	DF	(United States)	Anthony Markanich	22	2	2	0	26
14	FW	(Costa Rica)	Kenyel Michel	0	0	0	0	0
15	DF	(New Zealand)	Michael Boxall	14	0	1	0	15
16	MF	(United States)	Aziel Jackson	1	0	0	0	1
17	FW	(Liberia)	Darius Randell	0	0	0	0	0
18	FW	(Colombia)	Mauricio González	12	2	3	0	17
19	DF	(United States)	Britton Fischer	0	0	0	0	0
20	MF	(United States)	Wil Trapp	21	1	3	0	25
21	FW	(South Africa)	Bongokuhle Hlongwane	15	1	1	0	17
22	FW	(Canada)	Marcus Caldeira	5	0	2	0	7
23	DF	(Germany)	Morris Duggan	22	2	3	0	27
24	MF	(United States)	Julian Gressel	4	0	1	0	5
25	MF	(Greece)	Nectarios Triantis	17	2	0	0	19
26	MF	(Argentina)	Joaquín Pereyra	22	2	3	0	27
27	DF	(United States)	DJ Taylor	4	1	1	0	6
28	DF	(Colombia)	Jefferson Díaz	20	2	3	0	25
29	FW	(Senegal)	Mamadou Dieng	18	2	2	0	22
30	MF	(France)	Owen Gene	21	2	3	0	26
32	FW	(New Zealand)	Troy Putt	1	0	0	0	1
33	DF	(United States)	Kieran Chandler	1	1	1	0	3
67	DF	(Panama)	Carlos Harvey	8	1	3	0	12
94	GK	(United States)	Kayne Rizvanovich	0	0	0	0	0
99	FW	(United States)	Jordan Adebayo-Smith	0	0	0	0	0

=== Goalscorers ===
As of August 29th, 2026

Rk.	No.	Pos.	Nat.	Player	MLS	U.S. Open Cup	Leagues Cup	MLS Cup Playoffs	Season total
1	9	FW	(Italy)	Kelvin Yeboah	11	0	0	0	11
2	13	DF	(United States)	Anthony Markanich	6	0	0	0	6
3	26	MF	(Argentina)	Joaquín Pereyra	3	0	2	0	5
4	8	FW	(Argentina)	Tomás Chancalay	2	1	1	0	4
5	18	FW	(Colombia)	Mauricio González	2	0	1	0	3
6	22	FW	(Canada)	Marcus Caldeira	2	0	0	0	2
7	23	DF	(Germany)	Morris Duggan	1	0	0	0	1
7	25	MF	(Greece)	Nectarios Triantis	1	0	0	0	1
7	3	DF	(United States)	Kyle Duncan	1	0	0	0	1
7	2	DF	(United States)	Devin Padelford	1	0	0	0	1
Own Goals					0	0	0	0	0
Total					30	1	4	0	35

=== Assists ===
As of August 29th, 2026

Rk.	No.	Pos.	Nat.	Player	MLS	U.S. Open Cup	Leagues Cup	MLS Cup Playoffs	Season total
1	26	MF	(Argentina)	Joaquín Pereyra	10	0	1	0	11
2	8	MF	(Argentina)	Tomás Chancalay	4	0	0	0	4
2	30	MF	(France)	Owen Gene	4	0	0	0	4
2	3	DF	(United States)	Kyle Duncan	4	0	0	0	4
2	13	DF	(United States)	Anthony Markanich	3	1	0	0	4
6	22	FW	(Canada)	Marcus Caldeira	1	0	2	0	3
7	28	DF	(Colombia)	Jefferson Díaz	2	0	0	0	2
7	10	MF	(Colombia)	James Rodríguez	2	0	0	0	2
7	20	MF	(United States)	Wil Trapp	2	0	0	0	2
10	2	DF	(United States)	Devin Padelford	1	0	0	0	1
10	25	MF	(Greece)	Nectarios Triantis	1	0	0	0	1
10	15	DF	(New Zealand)	Michael Boxall	1	0	0	0	1
10	12	GK	(United States)	Drake Callender	1	0	0	0	1
10	9	FW	(Italy)	Kelvin Yeboah	1	0	0	0	1

=== Disciplinary record ===
As of August 29th, 2026

Rk.	No.	Pos.	Nat.	Player	MLS			U.S. Open Cup			Leagues Cup			MLS Cup Playoffs			Season total		
Rk.	No.	Pos.	Nat.	Player	Yellow card	Second yellow card	Red card	Yellow card	Second yellow card	Red card	Yellow card	Second yellow card	Red card	Yellow card	Second yellow card	Red card	Yellow card	Second yellow card	Red card
1	28	DF	(Colombia)	Jefferson Díaz	7	0	0	0	0	0	0	0	0	0	0	0	7	0	0
2	26	MF	(Argentina)	Joaquín Pereyra	4	0	0	1	0	0	1	0	0	0	0	0	6	0	0
3	13	DF	(United States)	Anthony Markanich	3	0	0	1	0	0	1	0	0	0	0	0	5	0	0
4	23	DF	(Germany)	Morris Duggan	4	0	0	0	0	0	0	0	0	0	0	0	4	0	0
4	8	FW	(Argentina)	Tomás Chancalay	4	0	0	0	0	0	0	0	0	0	0	0	4	0	0
6	3	DF	(United States)	Kyle Duncan	3	0	0	0	0	0	0	0	0	0	0	0	3	0	0
6	15	DF	(New Zealand)	Michael Boxall	3	0	0	0	0	0	0	0	0	0	0	0	3	0	0
6	30	MF	(France)	Owen Gene	2	0	0	0	0	0	1	0	0	0	0	0	3	0	0
9	25	MF	(Greece)	Nectarios Triantis	2	0	0	0	0	0	0	0	0	0	0	0	2	0	0
9	20	MF	(United States)	Wil Trapp	2	0	0	0	0	0	0	0	0	0	0	0	2	0	0
9	9	FW	(Italy)	Kelvin Yeboah	2	0	0	0	0	0	0	0	0	0	0	0	2	0	0
9	5	DF	(Argentina)	Nicolás Romero	2	0	0	0	0	0	0	0	0	0	0	0	2	0	0
9	24	MF	(United States)	Julian Gressel	1	0	0	0	0	0	1	0	0	0	0	0	2	0	0
9	2	DF	(United States)	Devin Padelford	0	0	0	0	0	0	2	0	0	0	0	0	2	0	0
15	27	DF	(United States)	D.J. Taylor	1	0	0	0	0	0	0	0	0	0	0	0	1	0	0
15	21	FW	(South Africa)	Bongokuhle Hlongwane	1	0	0	0	0	0	0	0	0	0	0	0	1	0	0
15	29	FW	(Senegal)	Mamadou Dieng	1	0	0	0	0	0	0	0	0	0	0	0	1	0	0
15	12	GK	(United States)	Drake Callender	1	0	0	0	0	0	0	0	0	0	0	0	1	0	0
15	18	FW	(Colombia)	Mauricio González	0	0	0	0	0	0	1	0	0	0	0	0	1	0	0
15	33	DF	(United States)	Kieran Chandler	0	0	0	0	0	0	1	0	0	0	0	0	1	0	0
Totals					43	0	0	2	0	0	8	0	0	0	0	0	53	0	0

=== Clean sheets ===
As of August 29th, 2026

Rk.	No.	Pos.	Nat.	Player	MLS	U.S. Open Cup	Leagues Cup	MLS Cup Playoffs	Season total
1	12	GK	(United States)	Drake Callender	5	0	0	0	5
2	1	GK	(United States)	Alec Smir	0	1	1	0	2

== Honors and awards ==
=== Bell Bank Man of the Match ===
Note: Bell Bank Man of the Match is voted on by fans on the MNUFC app near the end of each MLS Match.

Player	Position	Times Won	Most Recent
(Italy) Kelvin Yeboah	FW	4	Aug. 29th vs Orlando City SC
(United States) Drake Callender	GK	4	Aug. 15th at Real Salt Lake
(Argentina) Tomás Chancalay	MF	4	Aug. 1st vs San Diego FC
(Argentina) Joaquín Pereyra	MF	2	Jul. 22nd at Sporting Kansas City
(Germany) Morris Duggan	DF	2	May 16th at New England Revolution
(Colombia) James Rodríguez	MF	2	May 10th vs Austin FC
(United States) Anthony Markanich	DF	1	Aug. 22nd vs Atlanta United FC
(France) Owen Gene	MF	1	Apr. 22nd at FC Dallas
(Greece) Nectarios Triantis	MF	1	Mar. 7th at Nashville SC

Note: Bell Bank Man of the Match was not awarded after the games against Vancouver Whitecaps FC on March 15th.

=== MLS Team of the Matchday ===
Week	Player	Opponent	Position	Ref
2	(United States) Drake Callender	FC Cincinnati	Bench	
2	(Italy) Kelvin Yeboah	FC Cincinnati	Bench	
6	(United States) Anthony Markanich	LA Galaxy	DF	
7	(United States) Drake Callender	San Diego FC	GK	
7	(United States) Kyle Duncan	San Diego FC	Bench	
8	(Colombia) Jefferson Díaz	Portland Timbers	DF	
8	(Argentina) Tomás Chancalay	Portland Timbers	Bench	
9	(United States) Anthony Markanich	FC Dallas	DF	
11	(Italy) Kelvin Yeboah	Columbus Crew	FW	
11	(United States) Anthony Markanich	Columbus Crew	FW	
12	(Colombia) James Rodríguez	Austin FC	Bench	
20	(Argentina) Joaquín Pereyra	Real Salt Lake	Bench	
22	(Italy) Kelvin Yeboah	San Jose Earthquakes	FW	
22	(Argentina) Joaquín Pereyra	San Jose Earthquakes	MF	
22	(United States) Kyle Duncan	San Jose Earthquakes	Bench	

=== MLS Honors ===
Player	Pos	Honor	Ref
(Greece) Nectarios Triantis	MF	Goal of the Matchday, Matchday 3 at Nashville SC	
(United States) Anthony Markanich	DF	MLS All-Star	
(Argentina) Joaquín Pereyra	MF	Goal of the Matchday, Matchday 22 at San Jose Earthquakes	
