= Carlos Harvey =

Panamanian footballer (born 2000)

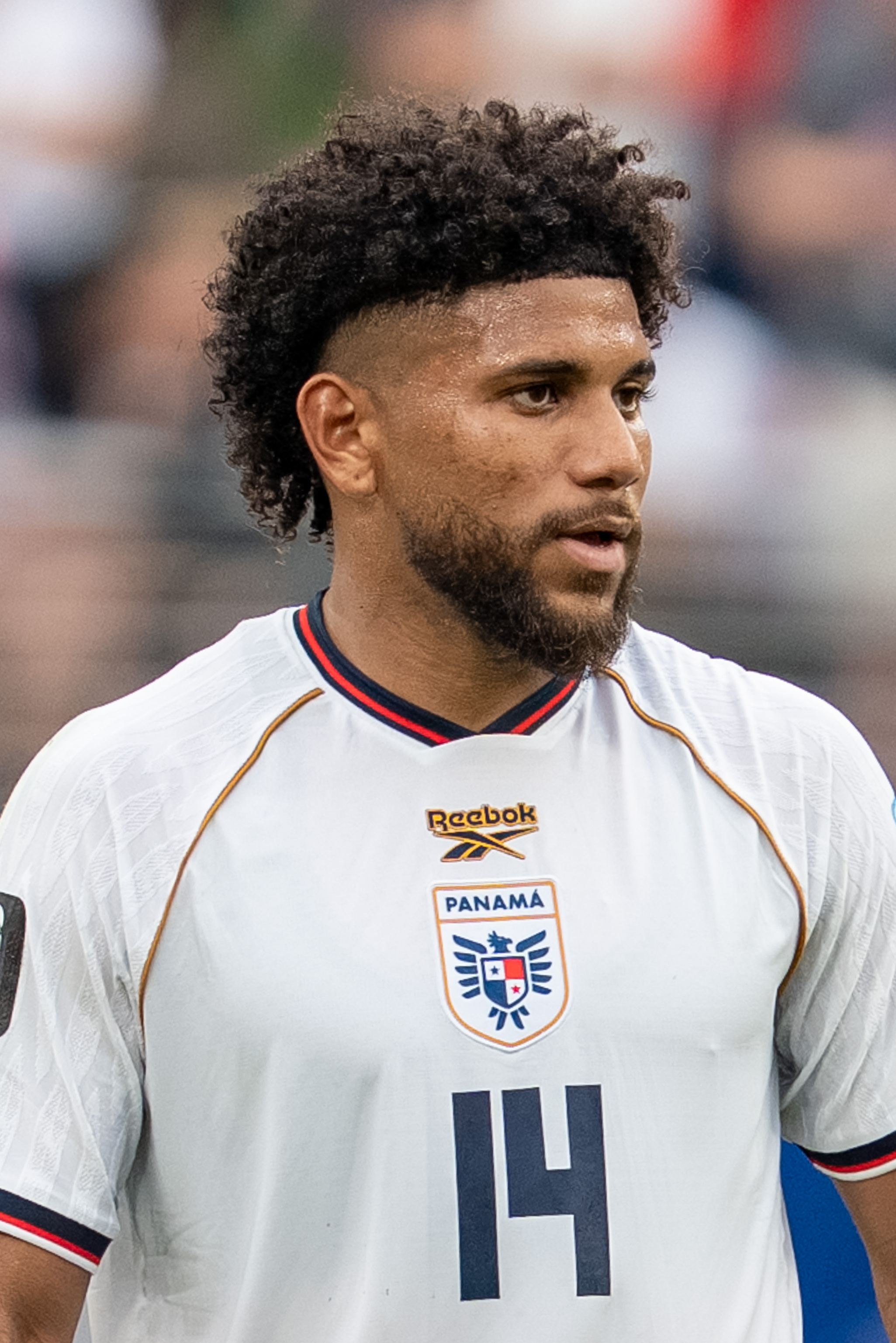
- Harvey with Panama in 2026

Personal information
- Full name: Carlos Miguel Harvey Cesneros
- Date of birth: 3 February 2000 (age 26)
- Place of birth: Panama City, Panama
- Height: 1.85 m (6 ft 1 in)
- Position: Defensive midfielder

Team information
- Current team: Minnesota United
- Number: 67

Senior career*
Years	Team	Apps	(Gls)
2018–2021	Tauro	1	(0)
2019–2020	→ LA Galaxy II (loan)	19	(2)
2020	→ LA Galaxy (loan)	6	(0)
2021–2022	LA Galaxy	4	(0)
2021–2022	→ LA Galaxy II (loan)	36	(4)
2023	Phoenix Rising	30	(5)
2024–	Minnesota United	58	(1)
2024–	Minnesota United 2	4	(3)

International career^{‡}
2018–2019	Panama U20	10	(0)
2019–	Panama	34	(3)
- * Club domestic league appearances and goals as of 19 September 2026 ‡ National team caps and goals as of 5 October 2026

Carlos Miguel Harvey Cesneros (born 3 February 2000) is a Panamanian professional footballer who plays as a defensive midfielder for Major League Soccer (MLS) club Minnesota United FC and the Panama national team.

== Club career ==
Harvey joined LA Galaxy II on loan from Tauro FC in February 2019. On 26 June 2020, Harvey moved to the LA Galaxy first team in Major League Soccer (MLS). He joined LA Galaxy on a permanent basis on 17 February 2021.

Harvey signed with Phoenix Rising FC on 7 February 2023.

Harvey transferred to MLS club Minnesota United on 24 January 2024. He scored his first career MLS goal on 4 July 2025 against FC Dallas.

== International career ==
Harvey represented the Panama under-20 team at the 2018 CONCACAF U-20 Championship in November 2018.

He made his senior international debut for Panama against the United States on 27 January 2019 in a friendly match.

He represented Panama at the 2026 FIFA World Cup.

== Career statistics ==
=== Club ===
As of match played 19 September 2026

Appearances and goals by club, season and competition
Club	Season	League			National cup		Other		Total	
Club	Season	Division	Apps	Goals	Apps	Goals	Apps	Goals	Apps	Goals
Tauro	2018–19	Liga LPF	1	0	—		—		1	0
LA Galaxy II (loan)	2019	USL Championship	19	2	—		—		19	2
LA Galaxy II (loan)	2020	USL Championship	1	0	—		—		1	0
LA Galaxy II (loan)	Total		20	2	—		—		20	2
LA Galaxy (loan)	2020	MLS	6	0	—		—		6	0
LA Galaxy	2021	MLS	4	0	—		—		4	0
LA Galaxy	2022	MLS	0	0	1	0	—		1	0
LA Galaxy	Total		4	0	1	0	—		5	0
LA Galaxy II	2021	USL Championship	17	3	—		—		17	3
LA Galaxy II	2022	USL Championship	19	1	—		—		19	1
LA Galaxy II	Total		36	4	—		—		36	4
Phoenix Rising	2023	USL Championship	34	5	2	2	—		36	7
Minnesota United	2024	MLS	21	0	1	0	2 (Note: Appearance(s) in Leagues Cup)	0	24	0
Minnesota United	2025	MLS	25	1	2	0	6 (Note: Three appearances in Leagues Cup, three appearances in MLS Cup playoffs)	1	33	1
Minnesota United	2026	MLS	12	0	1	0	3	0	16	0
Minnesota United	Total		58	1	4	0	11	0	73	1
Minnesota United FC 2	2024	MLS Next Pro	3	3	—		—		3	3
Minnesota United FC 2	2026	MLS Next Pro	1	0	—		—		1	0
Minnesota United FC 2	Total		4	3	—		—		4	3
Career Total			163	15	7	2	11	0	179	17

=== International ===
As of match played 5 October 2026

Appearances and goals by national team and year
National team	Year	Apps	Goals
Panama	2019	1	0
Panama	2021	1	0
Panama	2023	2	1
Panama	2024	7	0
Panama	2025	12	1
Panama	2026	11	1
Total		34	3

Scores and results list Panama's goal tally first, score column indicates score after each Harvey goal.

List of international goals scored by Carlos Harvey
No.	Date	Venue	Opponent	Score	Result	Competition
1	13 March 2023	PayPal Park, San Jose, United States	Guatemala	1–0	1–1	Friendly
2	8 September 2025	Rommel Fernández Stadium, Panama City, Panama	Guatemala	1–1	1–1	2026 FIFA World Cup qualification
3	31 May 2026	Estádio do Maracanã, Rio de Janeiro, Brazil	Brazil	2–6	2–6	Friendly

== Honours ==
Panama

- CONCACAF Nations League runner-up: 2024–25
