= Marcus Caldeira =

Canadian soccer player (born 2004)

Personal information
- Date of birth: October 14, 2004 (age 22)
- Place of birth: Mississauga, Ontario, Canada
- Height: 1.88 m (6 ft 2 in)
- Position: Forward

Team information
- Current team: Minnesota United FC
- Number: 22

Youth career
- Mississauga Falcons
- Erin Mills SC
- Sigma FC

College career
Years	Team	Apps	(Gls)
2022–2025	West Virginia Mountaineers	84	(42)

Senior career*
Years	Team	Apps	(Gls)
2021–2022	Forge FC	3	(0)
2021–2022	→ Sigma FC (loan)	23	(5)
2023	Sigma FC	12	(6)
2026–	Minnesota United	16	(7)
2026–	→ Minnesota United 2	16	(10)
- * Club domestic league appearances and goals as of November 7, 2026

Marcus Caldeira (born October 14, 2004) is a Canadian soccer player who currently plays for Minnesota United FC in Major League Soccer.

== Early life ==
Caldeira played youth soccer with Mississauga Falcons and Erin Mills SC, later joining Sigma FC.

== College career ==
In 2022, he committed to attend West Virginia University to play for the men's soccer team. He scored his first goals on October 7, 2022, against the Old Dominion Monarchs. In his freshman season, he tied for the team lead in goals with five, also adding four assists.

He began his sophomore season by scoring eight goals in the first seven games of the season. In September 2023, he was named the Sun Belt Conference Offensive Player of the Week. On October 18, 2023, he scored a hat trick in a 5-2 victory over the Marshall Thundering Herd. The performance earned him NCAA Player of the Week honours. At the end of the season he was named to the All-Sun Belt First Team, All-Southeast Region First Team, a Second-Team All-American, College Soccer News First-Team All-American, CSC First-Team Academic All-American, and CSC Academic All-District.

At the 2024 MLS SuperDraft, he became the first player in school history to be selected in the first round. However, rather than to turn professional, he opted to return to West Virginia for the 2024 season. Ahead of the 2024 season, he was named the Sun Belt Preseason Offensive Player of the Year. In October 2024, he was named the Sun Belt Offensive Player of the Week. At the end of the season, he was named to the All-Sun Belt Second Team, All-Southeast Region Second Team, a Sun Belt Elite Award Winner, and an Academic All-American of the Year, Academic All-District, and All-America Team Second Team.

Ahead of the 2025 season, he was again named the Sun Belt Preseason Offensive Player of the Year. In September 2025, he again earned Sun Belt Offensive Player of the Week honours. On November 20, 2025, he scored a hat trick in a 4-3 victory over the St. John's Red Storm to advance to the second round of the NCAA tournament. At the end of the season, he was named the Sun Belt Player of the Year, Sun Belt Offensive Player of the Year, named to the All-Sun Belt First Team, and named Academic All-District. While attending West Virginia University he obtained a degree in finance, graduating with a 4.0 GPA and was awarded the Order of Augusta honor.

== Club career ==
On July 30, 2021, he signed a developmental contract with Forge FC of the Canadian Premier League. In April 2022, he signed a second developmental contract with Forge. He spent most of 2021 and 2022 playing with Forge's affiliate club Sigma FC in League1 Ontario. He continued with Sigma in 2023. In 2023, he was named the L1O Young Player of the Year and was a Second Team All-Star.

At the 2024 MLS SuperDraft, he was selected in the first round (20th overall) by Minnesota United FC. He returned to college for the 2024 and 2025 seasons. In January 2026, he signed a one-year contract with three option years through the 2028-29 season. He debuted with the second team in MLS Next Pro, scoring a hat trick in the season-opener on March 1, in a 4-2 victory over Austin FC II, which earned him MLS Next Pro Player of the Matchweek honours. In June 2026, he earned his second MLS Next Pro Player of the Matchweek honour. He made his first team debut in MLS on May 23 against Real Salt Lake. On August 23, he scored his first MLS goal in a 5-1 victory over the San Jose Earthquakes. In September 2026, he was named to the MLS Team of the Matchweek, after scoring two goals in a match against the Portland Timbers.

== International career ==
In October 2026, Caldeira was called up to the Canada national team, as an injury replacement for Cyle Larin for a friendly against the United States.

== Career statistics ==
As of match played November 7, 2026

Club	Season	League			Playoffs		National Cup		Continental		Other		Total	
Club	Season	Division	Apps	Goals	Apps	Goals	Apps	Goals	Apps	Goals	Apps	Goals	Apps	Goals
Forge FC	2021	Canadian Premier League	0	0	0	0	0	0	0	0	—		0	0
Forge FC	2022	Canadian Premier League	3	0	0	0	1	0	0	0	—		4	0
Forge FC	Total		3	0	0	0	1	0	0	0	0	0	4	0
Sigma FC (loan)	2021	League1 Ontario	10	1	—		—		—		—		10	1
Sigma FC (loan)	2022	League1 Ontario	13	4	—		—		—		—		13	4
Sigma FC	2023	League1 Ontario	12	6	—		—		—		—		12	6
Sigma FC	Total		35	11	0	0	0	0	0	0	0	0	35	11
Minnesota United 2	2026	MLS Next Pro	16	10	0	0	—		—		—		16	10
Minnesota United	2026	Major League Soccer	16	7	0	0	0	0	—		2	0	18	7
Career total			70	28	0	0	1	0	0	0	2	0	73	28
