= Britton Fischer =

American soccer player (born 2004)

Personal information
- Full name: Britton Fischer
- Date of birth: February 25, 2004 (age 22)
- Place of birth: Greenville, North Carolina, US
- Height: 6 ft 4 in (1.93 m)
- Position: Defender

Team information
- Current team: Hartford Athletic (on loan from Minnesota United)

Youth career
- 2019–2021: North Carolina FC

Senior career*
Years	Team	Apps	(Gls)
2021–2022	North Carolina FC	30	(0)
2021–2022	→ North Carolina FC U23 (loan)	23	(0)
2023–2025	Minnesota United 2	73	(2)
2026–	Minnesota United	0	(0)
2026–	→ Hartford Athletic (loan)	26	(0)
- * Club domestic league appearances and goals as of 22:57, 4 November 2026 (UTC)

Britton Fischer (born February 25, 2004) is an American soccer player who plays as a defender for Hartford Athletic on loan from for Major League Soccer club Minnesota United.

== Club career ==
Fischer joined the North Carolina FC academy in 2019, where he played before signing an academy contract with the club's USL League One side for the 2021 season.

He made his debut on May 22, 2021, appearing as an 86th-minute substitute in a goalless draw with Richmond Kickers.

On March 1, 2023, Fischer was transferred to MLS Next Pro side Minnesota United FC 2 for an undisclosed fee. On April 22, 2023, Fischer signed a short-term deal to join Minnesota United's Major League Soccer roster.

On May 7, 2025, Fischer signed a short-term agreement with Minnesota United ahead of a U.S. Open Cup match against Louisville City. Fischer would make his debut for the team that same day as a 67th-minute substitute for Julian Gressel as Minnesota won 1–0. On December 17, Fischer was signed to a one-year contract with a club option for a further two years.

== Career statistics ==
As of matches played November 2, 2025

Appearances and goals by club, season and competition
Club	Season	League			National cup		Continental		Playoffs		Total	
Club	Season	Division	Apps	Goals	Apps	Goals	Apps	Goals	Apps	Goals	Apps	Goals
North Carolina FC	2021	USL League One	16	0	0	0	—		—		16	0
North Carolina FC	2022	USL League One	14	0	0	0	—		—		14	0
North Carolina FC	Total		30	0	0	0	0	0	0	0	30	0
Minnesota United 2	2023	MLS Next Pro	19	1	—		—				19	1
Minnesota United 2	2024	MLS Next Pro	28	0	2	0	—				30	0
Minnesota United 2	2025	MLS Next Pro	26	1	—		—		3	0	29	1
Minnesota United 2	Total		73	2	2	0	0	0	3	0	78	2
Minnesota United (loan)	2023	Major League Soccer	0	0	—		—		—		0	0
Minnesota United (loan)	2025	Major League Soccer	0	0	1	0	—		—		1	0
Minnesota United	2026	Major League Soccer	0	0	—		—		—		0	0
Minnesota United	Total		0	0	1	0	0	0	0	0	1	0
Career total			103	2	3	0	0	0	3	0	108	2
