= Anthony Markanich =

American soccer player (born 1999)

Personal information
- Full name: Anthony Charles Markanich Jr.
- Date of birth: December 26, 1999 (age 26)
- Place of birth: Bourbonnais, Illinois, United States
- Height: 6 ft 1 in (1.85 m)
- Position: Defender

Team information
- Current team: Minnesota United
- Number: 13

Youth career
- 2015–2016: Chicago Fire
- 2017–2018: Olympiacos Chicago

College career
Years	Team	Apps	(Gls)
2018–2021	Northern Illinois Huskies	67	(17)

Senior career*
Years	Team	Apps	(Gls)
2019–2021	Green Bay Voyageurs	12	(3)
2022–2023	Colorado Rapids	13	(0)
2022–2023	Colorado Rapids 2	19	(0)
2023–2024	St. Louis City SC	29	(1)
2024	St. Louis City 2	1	(0)
2024–	Minnesota United	40	(10)
2024–	Minnesota United 2	3	(2)
- * Club domestic league appearances and goals as of April 10, 2026

Anthony Charles Markanich Jr. (born December 26, 1999) is an American professional soccer player who plays for Major League Soccer club Minnesota United.

== Career ==
=== Youth ===
Markanich attended Bradley-Bourbonnais Community High School, where he scored 40 goals and had 14 assists as a senior in 2017, helping the Boilermakers to a third-place finish in the Illinois 3A State Tournament while earning all-state honors. Markanich also played club soccer for Chicago Fire between 2015 and 2016, making 24 appearances. He later played with Olympiacos Chicago, who won the US Club Soccer 2018 U19 Super Group National Championship.

=== College and amateur ===
Markanich attended Northern Illinois University to play college soccer. In four seasons with the Huskies, Markanich made 67 appearances, scoring 17 goals and tallying 24 assists. He was a three-time first-team all-Mid-American Conference (MAC) honoree and a four-time All-MAC honoree. His 24 career assists are tied for second all-time in program history while his 58 total points were ninth best in NIU history.

While at college, Markanich played with USL League Two side Green Bay Voyageurs between 2019 and 2021, without the 2020 season been cancelled due to the COVID-19 pandemic. In total, he made twelve appearances, scoring three goals and tallying three assists.

=== Professional ===
On January 11, 2022, Markanich was drafted 26th overall in the 2022 MLS SuperDraft by Colorado Rapids. He signed a one-year deal with the Rapids on March 3, 2022. He made his first-team debut on May 22, 2022, starting in a 1–0 win over Seattle Sounders FC.

On August 1, 2023, Markanich was traded to St. Louis City SC in exchange for $75,000 in 2023 General Allocation Money and St. Louis' 2024 1st round MLS SuperDraft pick with an additional $75,000 in 2024 if conditional incentives are reached.

Markanich was traded to Minnesota United on August 15, 2024 in exchange for $50,000 in 2024 General Allocation Money, with another $100,000 in General Allocation Money depending on meeting certain performance related requirements.

Markanich scored his first goal for Minnesota on May 4, 2025 away at Austin FC in a 3-0 away victory for the loons. He followed this up with another goal at home against Inter Miami on May 10, with a 4-1 win at home for Minnesota. Markanich scored two goals against Sporting Kansas City on October 4, 2025. He ended the season tied as Minnesota United's leading scorer with Kelvin Yeboah. Both ended the season with 13 goals. Prior to the 2025 season, Markanich had not been known for scoring goals. In August 2025, Minnesota United and Markanich extended his contract, which had been due to expire at the end of the 2025 season.

== International career ==
=== Philippines ===
In March 2024, Markanich was reportedly one of the players being recruited by head coach Tom Saintfiet and team manager Freddy Gonzalez to play for the Philippines.

== Personal life ==
Markanich has a twin brother, Nick Markanich, who also plays professional soccer, most recently playing with Spanish Segunda División side CD Castellón.

== Career statistics ==
As of match played October 17, 2026.

Club	Season	League			U.S. Open Cup		Other		Total	
Club	Season	Division	Apps	Goals	Apps	Goals	Apps	Goals	Apps	Goals
Colorado Rapids	2022	MLS	3	0	-		-		3	0
Colorado Rapids	2023	MLS	10	0	-		-		10	0
Colorado Rapids	Total		13	0					13	0
St. Louis City SC	2023	MLS	10	1	-		1 (Note: Appearance(s) in MLS Cup Playoffs)	0	11	1
St. Louis City SC	2024	MLS	19	0	-		-		19	0
St. Louis City SC	Total		29	0					30	1
Minnesota United	2024	MLS	2	0	-		2	0	4	0
Minnesota United	2025	MLS	31	9	3	2	4	1	39	12
Minnesota United	2026	MLS	29	8	2	0	-		31	8
Minnesota United	Total		62	17					74	20
Career Total			104	18	5	2	7	1	117	21

== Honors ==
St. Louis City SC

- Western Conference (regular season): 2023

Individual

- MLS All-Star: 2026
