= Owen Gene =

French footballer (born 2003)

Personal information
- Full name: Owen Gene
- Date of birth: 19 March 2003 (age 23)
- Place of birth: Nanterre, France
- Height: 1.85 m (6 ft 1 in)
- Position: Midfielder

Team information
- Current team: Minnesota United
- Number: 30

Youth career
- 2009–2014: US Croissy
- 2014–2018: Versailles
- 2018–2021: Amiens

Senior career*
Years	Team	Apps	(Gls)
2020–2023	Amiens II	14	(0)
2021–2025	Amiens	97	(0)
2025–	Minnesota United	30	(0)
2025	Minnesota United 2	1	(0)

International career
2023	France U20	1	(0)
- * Club domestic league appearances and goals as of 17:10, 7 November 2025 (UTC)

Owen Gene (born 19 March 2003) is a French professional footballer who plays as a midfielder for Major League Soccer club Minnesota United.

== Club career ==
Born in France, Gene is of Martiniquais and Malagasy descent.

Gene is a product of the youth academies of US Croissy, Versailles and Amiens. He signed his first professional contract with Amiens on 22 June 2021. He made his professional debut with Amiens in a 1–1 Ligue 2 tie with Le Havre AC on 20 November 2021. On 11 February 2025, Gene signed a three-year deal with Major League Soccer side Minnesota United for a reported fee of $2 million.

== International career ==
Gene was called up to the France U20s in March 2023.

== Career statistics ==
=== Club ===
As of match played 30 March 2025

Appearances and goals by club, season and competition
Club	Season	League			National cup (Note: Includes Coupe de France, U.S. Open Cup)		Continental		Other		Total	
Club	Season	Division	Apps	Goals	Apps	Goals	Apps	Goals	Apps	Goals	Apps	Goals
Amiens II	2020–21	Championnat National 3	1	0	—		—		—		1	0
Amiens II	2021–22	Championnat National 3	7	0	—		—		—		7	0
Amiens II	2022–23	Championnat National 3	6	0	—		—		—		6	0
Amiens II	Total		14	0	—		—		—		14	0
Amiens SC	2021–22	Ligue 2	20	0	4	1	—		—		24	1
Amiens SC	2022–23	Ligue 2	24	0	3	0	—		—		27	0
Amiens SC	2023–24	Ligue 2	33	0	3	0	—		—		36	0
Amiens SC	2024–25	Ligue 2	20	0	2	0	—		—		22	0
Amiens SC	Total		97	0	12	1	—		—		109	1
Minnesota United	2025	MLS	5	0	0	0	0	0	—		5	0
Career total			116	0	12	1	0	0	—		128	1
