= Alec Smir =

American soccer player (born 1999)

Alec Smir أليك سمير
Personal information
- Full name: Alec Bassam Naim Smir
- Birth name: Alec Matthew Smir
- Date of birth: April 13, 1999 (age 27)
- Place of birth: Greensboro, North Carolina, U.S.
- Height: 1.87 m (6 ft 2 in)
- Position: Goalkeeper

Team information
- Current team: Minnesota United
- Number: 1

Youth career
- 2013–2017: North Carolina Fusion

College career
Years	Team	Apps	(Gls)
2017–2021	North Carolina Tar Heels	68	(0)

Senior career*
Years	Team	Apps	(Gls)
2017	Carolina Dynamo	2	(0)
2018	Ocean City Nor'easters	4	(0)
2022–	Minnesota United 2	22	(0)
2023	→ Colorado Springs Switchbacks (loan)	0	(0)
2024–	Minnesota United	5	(0)

International career^{‡}
2026–	Jordan	1	(0)
- * Club domestic league appearances and goals as of 29 June 2025 ‡ National team caps and goals as of 27 September 2026

Alec Matthew Smir (Arabic: أليك بسام نعيم سمير; born April 13, 1999) is a soccer player who plays as a goalkeeper for MLS club Minnesota United. Born in the United States, he represents the Jordan national team.

== Career ==
=== Youth ===
Smir attended Greensboro Day School, also playing club soccer for NC Fusion from 2013 to 2017, captaining the team during the 2016 season. He was also selected for training camps with the United States under-18 side. In 2017, he also played with Carolina Dynamo in the USL PDL.

=== College ===
In 2017, Smir committed to playing college soccer at University of North Carolina at Chapel Hill. He redshirted his sophomore season in 2018, but went on to make 68 appearances for the Tar Heels. He was named All-Atlantic Coast Conference (ACC) Second Team and United Soccer Coaches All-South Region Second Team in 2020, and All-ACC First Team and United Soccer Coaches All-South Region Second Team in 2021.

During the summer of 2018, Smir also appeared in the PDL for Ocean City Nor'easters, making four regular season appearances.

=== Professional ===
On January 11, 2022, Smir was selected 62nd overall in the 2022 MLS SuperDraft by FC Dallas. On March 23, 2022, it was announced that Smir had signed with MLS Next Pro side Minnesota United 2 ahead of their inaugural season. Smir went on to make eight regular season appearances for Minnesota in 2022. He was also the winner of Goalie Wars, part of the MLS NEXT Pro All-Star Skills Challenge at the 2022 MLS All-Star Game on August 10, 2022.

On March 13, 2023, Smir was loaned to USL Championship side Colorado Springs Switchbacks for the 2023 season. On May 16, 2023, Smir was recalled from his loan after making only a single appearance for Colorado Springs, which came in the Lamar Hunt US Open Cup. On June 15, 2024, Smir made a permanent move to Minnesota United's first team roster.

== International career ==
Eligible to play for the United States and Jordan, Smir was called up to the Jordan national football team on September 17, 2026, to participate in a set of friendly matches against Syria and Venezuela on September 28 and October 6, 2026; respectively. On September 30 however, Smir was removed from the squad after sustaining an injury.

== Personal life ==
He is of Jordanian descent through his father.

== Career statistics ==
=== Club ===
As of match played August 26, 2026

Appearances and goals by club, season and competition
Club	Season	League			U.S. Open Cup		Other		Total	
Club	Season	Division	Apps	Goals	Apps	Goals	Apps	Goals	Apps	Goals
Minnesota United 2	2022	MLS Next Pro	8	0	—		—		8	0
Minnesota United 2	2023	MLS Next Pro	4	0	—		—		4	0
Minnesota United 2	2024	MLS Next Pro	8	0	—		—		8	0
Minnesota United 2	2025	MLS Next Pro	2	0	—		—		2	0
Minnesota United 2	Total		22	0	—		—		22	0
Colorado Springs Switchbacks (loan)	—		—		1	0	—		1	0
Minnesota United	2024	Major League Soccer	3	0	0	0	—		3	0
Minnesota United	2025	Major League Soccer	2	0	0	0	—		2	0
Minnesota United	2026	Major League Soccer	1	0	1	0	1 (Note: Appearance in Leagues Cup)	0	3	0
Minnesota United	Total		6	0	1	0	1	0	8	0
Career total			28	0	2	0	1	0	31	0

=== International ===
As of match played September 27, 2026

Appearances and goals by national team and year
National team	Year	Apps	Goals
Jordan	2026	1	0
Total		1	0
