= Wessel Speel =

Dutch footballer (born 2001)

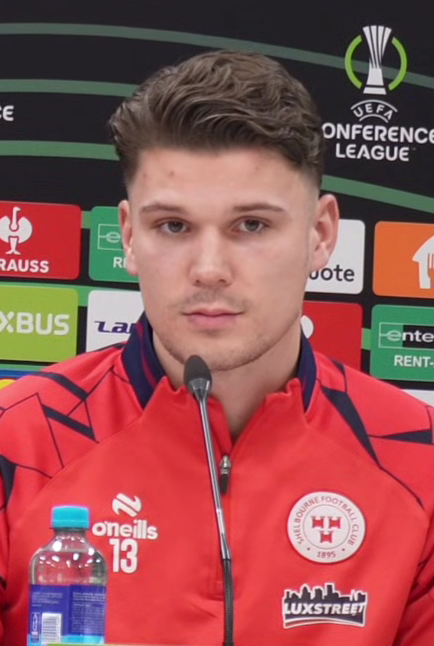
- Speel with Shelbourne in 2025

Personal information
- Date of birth: 17 October 2001 (age 25)
- Place of birth: Gouda, Netherlands
- Height: 1.98 m (6 ft 6 in)
- Position: Goalkeeper

Team information
- Current team: Almere City (on loan from Minnesota United)
- Number: 1

Youth career
- Olympia
- –2017: Jodan Boys
- 2017–2020: FC Utrecht

College career
Years	Team	Apps	(Gls)
2020–2023	Hofstra Pride	75	(0)
2024	Duke Blue Devils	19	(0)

Senior career*
Years	Team	Apps	(Gls)
2020	Jong FC Utrecht	0	(0)
2022	Long Island Rough Riders	13	(0)
2024	Salem City FC		
2025	Minnesota United 2	6	(0)
2025–	Minnesota United	3	(0)
2025	→ Shelbourne (loan)	11	(0)
2026	→ Shelbourne (loan)	21	(0)
2026–	→ Almere City (loan)	2	(0)
- * Club domestic league appearances and goals as of 13:17, 20 August 2026 (UTC)

Wessel Speel (born 17 October 2001) is a Dutch professional footballer who plays as a goalkeeper for Eerste Divisie club Almere City, on loan from Major League Soccer club Minnesota United.

== Early life ==
Speel was born on 17 October 2001. Born in Gouda, the Netherlands, he is a native of the city. Growing up, he attended Hofstra University in the United States and Duke University in the United States.

== Career ==
Speel started his career with Dutch side Jong FC Utrecht in 2020, where he did not make a league appearance. Following his stint there, he signed for American side Long Island Rough Riders, where he made 18 appearances.

Ahead of the 2025 season, he signed for Major League Soccer side Minnesota United. On 15 June 2025, he made his league debut for the club during a 4–2 home loss to San Diego FC. On 22 July 2025, he was sent on loan to League of Ireland Premier Division side Shelbourne until the end of their 2025 season, following an injury to first choice goalkeeper Conor Kearns. On 10 January 2026, it was announced that Speel would be returning to Shelbourne on a season-long loan. On 31 July 2026, it was announced that Speel's loan at Shelbourne had been cut short, with Minnesota United extending his contract until the end of 2027 with the option of a further year in the club's favour, while he was also immediately sent out on loan to Eerste Divisie club Almere City in his homeland until the summer of 2027.

== Career statistics ==
As of match played on 14 August 2026

Appearances and goals by club, season and competition
Club	Season	League			National cup (Note: Includes U.S. Open Cup & FAI Cup)		Continental		Other		Total	
Club	Season	Division	Apps	Goals	Apps	Goals	Apps	Goals	Apps	Goals	Apps	Goals
Jong FC Utrecht	2019–20	Eerste Divisie	0	0	—		—		—		0	0
Long Island Rough Riders	2022	USL League Two	13	0	—		—		5 (Note: Appearances in the 2022 USL League Two playoffs)	0	18	0
Minnesota United 2	2025	MLS Next Pro	6	0	—		—		—		6	0
Minnesota United	2025	Major League Soccer	3	0	2	0	—		—		5	0
Minnesota United	2026	Major League Soccer	0	0	0	0	—		—		0	0
Minnesota United	Total		3	0	2	0	—		—		5	0
Shelbourne (loan)	2025	LOI Premier Division	11	0	0	0	11 (Note: 1 appearance in the UEFA Champions League; 2 appearances in the UEFA Europa League; 8 appearances in the UEFA Conference League)	0	—		22	0
Shelbourne (loan)	2026	LOI Premier Division	21	0	0	0	0 (Note: Appearances in the UEFA Conference League)	0	0 (Note: Appearances in the Leinster Senior Cup)	0	21	0
Almere City (loan)	2026–27	Eerste Divisie	0	0	0	0	—		—		0	0
Career total			54	0	2	0	11	0	5	0	72	0
