= Fred Emmings =

American soccer player (born 2004)

Personal information
- Date of birth: 8 February 2004 (age 22)
- Place of birth: Saint Paul, Minnesota, U.S.
- Height: 1.96 m (6 ft 5 in)
- Position: Goalkeeper

Youth career
- Minnesota United

Senior career*
| Years | Team | Apps | (Gls) |
| 2020–2023 | Minnesota United | 0 | (0) |
| 2022–2023 | → Minnesota United 2 (loan) | 37 | (0) |
| 2024 | Minnesota United 2 | 1 | (0) |

International career
| 2019 | Luxembourg U16 | 2 | (0) |
- * Club domestic league appearances and goals as of 21:20, 13 November 2024 (UTC)

Fred Emmings (born 8 February 2004) is a footballer who plays as a goalkeeper. Born in the United States, he has trained with both the United States and Luxembourg youth national teams.

== Early life ==
Emmings is a native of Saint Paul, Minnesota, where he attended Saint Paul Central High School.

== Career ==
Emmings started his professional career in January 2020 with American side Minnesota United, signing as the club's first-ever Homegrown Player.

In January 2024, Emmings signed an MLS Next Pro contract with Minnesota United 2. He was released by Minnesota following the 2024 season.

Internationally, Emmings appeared in two friendlies for the Luxembourg U-16 national team in 2019.

=== Style of play ===
Emmings is known for his height and decision-making ability.

== Personal life ==
Emmings is of Luxembourgish descent through his great-grandparents.

== Career statistics ==
=== Club ===
As of match played 14 June 2024

Appearances and goals by club, season and competition
| Club | Season | League | | | National cup | | Continental | | Total | |
| Club | Season | Division | Apps | Goals | Apps | Goals | Apps | Goals | Apps | Goals |
|---|---|---|---|---|---|---|---|---|---|---|
| Minnesota United | 2020 | MLS | 0 | 0 | — | | — | | 0 | 0 |
| Minnesota United | 2021 | MLS | 0 | 0 | — | | — | | 0 | 0 |
| Minnesota United | 2022 | MLS | 0 | 0 | 0 | 0 | — | | 0 | 0 |
| Minnesota United | 2023 | MLS | 0 | 0 | 0 | 0 | 0 | 0 | 0 | 0 |
| Minnesota United | Total | | 0 | 0 | 0 | 0 | 0 | 0 | 0 | 0 |
| Minnesota United 2 (loan) | 2022 | MLS Next Pro | 13 | 0 | — | | — | | 13 | 0 |
| Minnesota United 2 (loan) | 2023 | MLS Next Pro | 24 | 0 | — | | — | | 24 | 0 |
| Minnesota United 2 (loan) | Total | | 37 | 0 | — | | — | | 37 | 0 |
| Minnesota United 2 | 2024 | MLS Next Pro | 1 | 0 | 0 | 0 | — | | 1 | 0 |
| Career Total | | | 38 | 0 | 0 | 0 | 0 | 0 | 38 | 0 |
