= Devin Padelford =

American soccer player (born 2003)

- Padelford with the New York Red Bulls in 2026

Personal information
- Full name: Devin Padelford
- Date of birth: January 3, 2003 (age 23)
- Place of birth: Maplewood, Minnesota, United States
- Height: 6 ft 0 in (1.83 m)
- Position: Fullback

Team information
- Current team: New York Red Bulls (on loan from Minnesota United)
- Number: 59

Youth career
- 2017–2021: St. Croix SC
- 2021–2022: Minnesota United

Senior career*
Years	Team	Apps	(Gls)
2022–	Minnesota United	32	(1)
2022–2025	Minnesota United 2	48	(0)
2025	→ St. Louis City (loan)	10	(0)
2026–	→ New York Red Bulls (loan)	4	(0)
- * Club domestic league appearances and goals as of September 22, 2026

Devin Padelford (born January 3, 2003) is an American professional soccer player who plays as a fullback for Major League Soccer club New York Red Bulls, on loan from Minnesota United.

== Career ==
=== Youth ===
Padelford attended Woodbury High School where he played soccer at the varsity level. He graduated from Woodbury High School in 2021, where he was named All-State and Conference Player of the Year in 2021. Padelford also played club soccer with St. Croix Soccer Club, helping the team to win the Las Vegas Cup in 2019 and become State Champions in 2019 and 2021.

In 2021, he joined the newly launched Minnesota United academy team. Padelford played with the under-19 team and appeared in 13 MLS Next matches, scoring two goals and providing eight assists.

=== Minnesota United ===
On March 10, 2022, Padelford signed a three-year homegrown player contract with Major League Soccer side Minnesota United. He spent the 2022 season with the club's MLS Next Pro side, making 22 appearances and adding one assist. On June 3, 2023, Padelford made his MLS debut, starting in a 1–1 draw at home to Toronto FC.

=== St. Louis City ===
On July 22, 2025, St. Louis City announced the signing of Padelford on loan from Minnesota United.

== Career statistics ==
=== Club ===
As of match played September 19, 2026

Appearances and goals by club, season and competition
Club	Season	League			U.S. Open Cup		Continental		Total	
Club	Season	Division	Apps	Goals	Apps	Goals	Apps	Goals	Apps	Goals
Minnesota United	2023	MLS	8	1	1	0	—		9	1
Minnesota United	2024	MLS	24	0	1	0	—		25	0
Minnesota United	2025	MLS	4	0	1	0	—		5	0
Minnesota United	2026	MLS	16	1	2	0	—		18	1
Minnesota United	Total		52	2	5	0	—		57	2
St. Louis City (loan)	2025	MLS	10	0	0	0	—		0	0
New York Red Bulls (loan)	2026	MLS	4	0	—		—		4	0
Career total			66	2	5	0	0	0	71	2
