= Joseph Rosales =

Honduran footballer (born 2000)

Personal information
- Full name: Joseph Yerimid Rosales Erazo
- Date of birth: 6 November 2000 (age 26)
- Place of birth: Tegucigalpa, Honduras
- Height: 1.80 m (5 ft 11 in)
- Positions: Left-back; wide midfielder

Team information
- Current team: Austin FC
- Number: 30

Senior career*
| Years | Team | Apps | (Gls) |
| 2018–2022 | Independiente | 33 | (2) |
| 2021–2022 | → Minnesota United (loan) | 30 | (0) |
| 2022–2023 | → Minnesota United 2 (loan) | 3 | (0) |
| 2023–2025 | Minnesota United | 73 | (2) |
| 2026– | Austin FC | 30 | (1) |

International career^{‡}
| 2019 | Honduras U20 | 3 | (0) |
| 2021 | Honduras U23 | 3 | (0) |
| 2022– | Honduras | 42 | (1) |
- * Club domestic league appearances and goals as of 20:21, 1 November 2026 (UTC) ‡ National team caps and goals as of 17 November 2026

Joseph Yerimid Rosales Erazo (born 6 November 2000) is a Honduran professional footballer who plays as a left-back and wide midfielder for Major League Soccer club Austin FC and the Honduras national team.

== Club career ==
Rosales joined Minnesota United on loan in August, 2021 after three seasons with C.A. Independiente de La Chorrera of Liga Panemeña de Fútbol. After making 24 appearances in the 2022 MLS season, Minnesota United signed Rosales to a one-year contract with club options for 2024 and 2025.

For the 2024 season, Rosales became a starter as a left wingback. His contract with Minnesota United was extended in July 2024. After the emergence of Anthony Markanich in the 2025 season, Rosales began playing more games as a central midfielder.

In 2025, Rosales was banned by MLS for three games for using discriminatory language against Emmanuel Sabbi of the Vancouver Whitecaps.

At the end of the 2025 season, Minnesota United traded Rosales to Austin FC for $1.5 million in General Allocation Money.

== International career ==
In March, 2022, Rosales was called up to play for the senior national team.

== Career statistics ==
=== Club ===
As of match played 31 October 2026

Appearances and goals by club, season and competition
| Club | Season | League | | | National cup (Note: Includes Copa Panamá, U.S. Open Cup) | | Continental | | Other | | Total | |
| Club | Season | Division | Apps | Goals | Apps | Goals | Apps | Goals | Apps | Goals | Apps | Goals |
|---|---|---|---|---|---|---|---|---|---|---|---|---|
| Independiente | 2018-19 | Liga Panameña de Fútbol | 9 | 1 | 0 | 0 | — | | — | | 9 | 1 |
| Independiente | 2019 | Liga Panameña de Fútbol | 11 | 1 | — | | 4 (Note: Appearance(s) in CONCACAF League) | 0 | — | | 15 | 1 |
| Independiente | 2020 | Liga Panameña de Fútbol | 13 | 0 | — | | 1 | 0 | — | | 14 | 0 |
| Independiente | 2021 | Liga Panameña de Fútbol | 0 | 0 | — | | 0 | 0 | — | | 0 | 0 |
| Independiente | 2022 | Liga Panameña de Fútbol | 0 | 0 | — | | — | | — | | 0 | 0 |
| Independiente | Total | | 33 | 2 | 0 | 0 | 5 | 0 | — | | 38 | 2 |
| Minnesota United (loan) | 2021 | MLS | 6 | 0 | — | | — | | 1 (Note: Appearance(s) in MLS Cup playoffs) | 0 | 7 | 0 |
| Minnesota United (loan) | 2022 | MLS | 24 | 0 | 3 | 0 | — | | 1 | 0 | 28 | 0 |
| Minnesota United (loan) | Total | | 30 | 0 | 3 | 0 | — | | 2 | 0 | 35 | 0 |
| Minnesota United 2 (loan) | 2022 | MLS Next Pro | 1 | 0 | — | | — | | — | | 1 | 0 |
| Minnesota United 2 (loan) | 2023 | MLS Next Pro | 2 | 0 | — | | — | | — | | 2 | 0 |
| Minnesota United 2 (loan) | Total | | 3 | 0 | — | | — | | — | | 3 | 0 |
| Minnesota United | 2023 | MLS | 18 | 1 | 3 | 1 | 4 (Note: Appearance(s) in Leagues Cup) | 1 | — | | 25 | 3 |
| Minnesota United | 2024 | MLS | 30 | 0 | 0 | 0 | 2 | 0 | 3 | 1 | 35 | 1 |
| Minnesota United | 2025 | MLS | 25 | 1 | 2 | 0 | 3 | 0 | 3 | 0 | 30 | 1 |
| Minnesota United | Total | | 73 | 2 | 5 | 1 | 9 | 1 | 6 | 1 | 93 | 5 |
| Austin FC | 2026 | MLS | 30 | 1 | 1 | 0 | — | | 4 | 1 | 35 | 2 |
| Career total | | | 169 | 5 | 9 | 1 | 14 | 1 | 12 | 2 | 204 | 9 |

=== International ===
As of match played 17 November 2026

Appearances and goals by national team and year
| National team | Year | Apps | Goals |
|---|---|---|---|
| Honduras | 2022 | 5 | 0 |
| Honduras | 2023 | 10 | 0 |
| Honduras | 2024 | 7 | 0 |
| Honduras | 2025 | 14 | 0 |
| Honduras | 2026 | 6 | 1 |
| Total | | 42 | 1 |

List of international goals scored by Joseph Rosales
| No. | Date | Venue | Cap | Opponent | Score | Result | Competition |
|---|---|---|---|---|---|---|---|
| 1 | 17 November 2026 | Al-Sadaqua Walsalam Stadium, Kuwait City, Kuwait | 42 | Kuwait | 1–0 | 2–0 | Friendly |
