= Drake Callender =

American soccer player (born 1997)

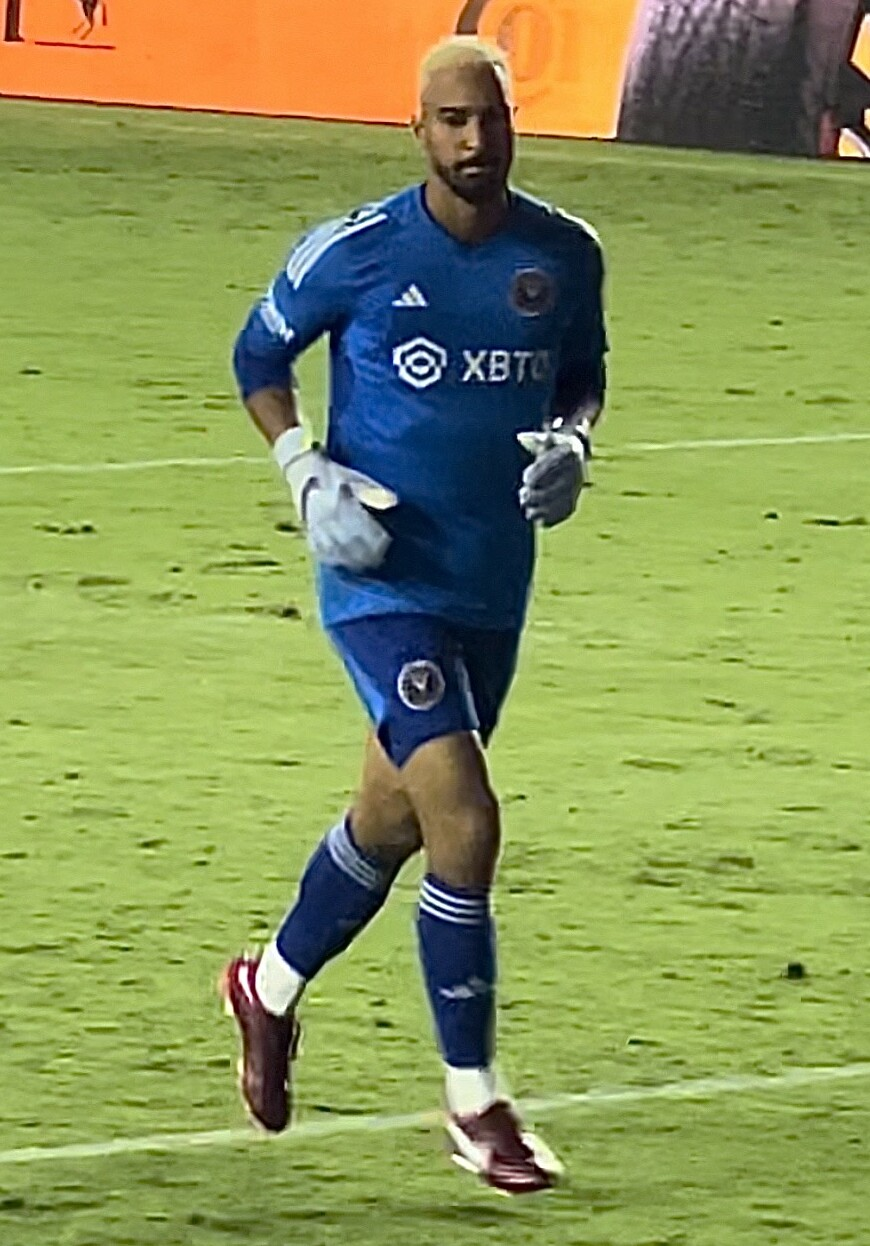
- Callender with Inter Miami in 2023

Personal information
- Full name: Drake Steven Callender
- Date of birth: October 7, 1997 (age 29)
- Place of birth: Sacramento, California, United States
- Height: 6 ft 3 in (1.91 m)
- Position: Goalkeeper

Team information
- Current team: Minnesota United
- Number: 12

Youth career
- 2010–2012: Cap FC United
- 2012–2013: Placer United
- 2013–2016: San Jose Earthquakes

College career
Years	Team	Apps	(Gls)
2016–2019	California Golden Bears	54	(0)

Senior career*
Years	Team	Apps	(Gls)
2019	San Francisco Glens	0	(0)
2020–2025	Inter Miami	92	(0)
2021	→ Fort Lauderdale CF (loan)	17	(0)
2025	Charlotte FC	0	(0)
2026–	Minnesota United	34	(0)
Medal record
Representing United States
Men's soccer
CONCACAF Nations League
Winner	2023 United States
Winner	2024 United States
- * Club domestic league appearances and goals as of November 7, 2026

Drake Steven Callender (born October 7, 1997) is an American professional soccer player who plays as a goalkeeper for Major League Soccer club Minnesota United.

== Early life ==
Callender played youth soccer with Cap FC United and Placer United, before going on to be part of the San Jose Earthquakes academy from 2013 to 2016.

In 2016, Callender began playing college soccer for the California Golden Bears. In four seasons, Callender made 54 appearances, keeping 16 clean sheets. He was named to the United Soccer Coaches NCAA All-Far West Region First Team and the All-Pac-12 First Team for the 2017 season. For the 2018 season, he was named to the preseason MAC Hermann Trophy Watch List and earned United Soccer Coaches NCAA All-Far West Region Third Team and All-Pac-12 Second Team honors.

While in college, Callender spent time with USL League Two side San Francisco Glens, but didn't appear for the team during the 2019 season.

== Club career ==
On November 12, 2019, Inter Miami acquired Callender's homegrown player rights from the San Jose Earthquakes in exchange for the 27th draft pick in the 2020 MLS SuperDraft, and potentially up to $150,000 in General Allocation Money if Callender were to meet certain performance-based metrics. He joined the club's roster ahead of their inaugural Major League Soccer season in 2020.

Callender made his professional debut on May 7, 2021, starting for Inter Miami affiliate Fort Lauderdale CF against Union Omaha in USL League One. Callendar made six saves during Inter Miami's 2023 season-opening victory over CF Montréal, earning him a spot in the league's Team of the Matchday for week one. On August 19, 2023, his team, Inter Miami, won the first edition of the Leagues Cup after a penalty kick shootout, in which he scored a penalty and saved two. Thanks to this, Callender was awarded the best goalkeeper title of the 2023 Leagues Cup and won Man of the Match.

On September 9, Callender had made 100 saves for Inter Miami in the 2023 MLS season, with him making his 100th save of the season against Sporting Kansas City.

He would start the 2024 MLS season on 21 February in a 2–1 win against Real Salt Lake. Inter Miami would go into the playoffs after having the most points in a Major League Soccer season were they lost to Atlanta United in the first round. At the end of the season he started in thirty-two games and would get a total of 104 saves.

On 29 March 2025, Callender would make his debut in the 2025 MLS season for Inter Miami coming as on as a late substitute for starting keeper, Oscar Ustari in a 2–1 win against Philadelphia Union.

On December 29, 2025, Minnesota United acquired Callender from Charlotte.

== International career ==
In August 2023, Callender received his first call-up to the United States senior national team by head coach Gregg Berhalter, for two friendly matches against Uzbekistan and Oman.

== Career statistics ==
=== Club ===
As of match played November 7, 2026

Appearances and goals by club, season and competition
Club	Season	League			Playoffs		National cup		Continental		Other		Total	
Club	Season	Division	Apps	Goals	Apps	Goals	Apps	Goals	Apps	Goals	Apps	Goals	Apps	Goals
Inter Miami	2020	MLS	—		—		—		—		—		—	
Inter Miami	2021	MLS	0	0	—		—		—		—		0	0
Inter Miami	2022	MLS	24	0	1	0	3	0	—		—		28	0
Inter Miami	2023	MLS	33	0	—		5	0	—		7 (Note: Appearances in Leagues Cup)	0	45	0
Inter Miami	2024	MLS	32	0	3	0	—		4 (Note: Appearances in CONCACAF Champions Cup)	0	3	0	42	0
Inter Miami	2025	MLS	3	0	—		—		0	0	0	0	3	0
Inter Miami	Total		92	0	4	0	8	0	4	0	10	0	118	0
Fort Lauderdale CF (loan)	2021	USL League One	17	0	—		—		—		—		17	0
Minnesota United	2026	MLS	34	0	—		1	0	—		0	0	35	0
Career total			143	0	4	0	9	0	4	0	10	0	170	0

== Honors ==
Inter Miami

- Leagues Cup: 2023
- Supporters' Shield: 2024

United States

- CONCACAF Nations League: 2022–23, 2023–24

Individual

- Leagues Cup Best Goalkeeper: 2023
