= Aziel Jackson =

American soccer player (born 2001)

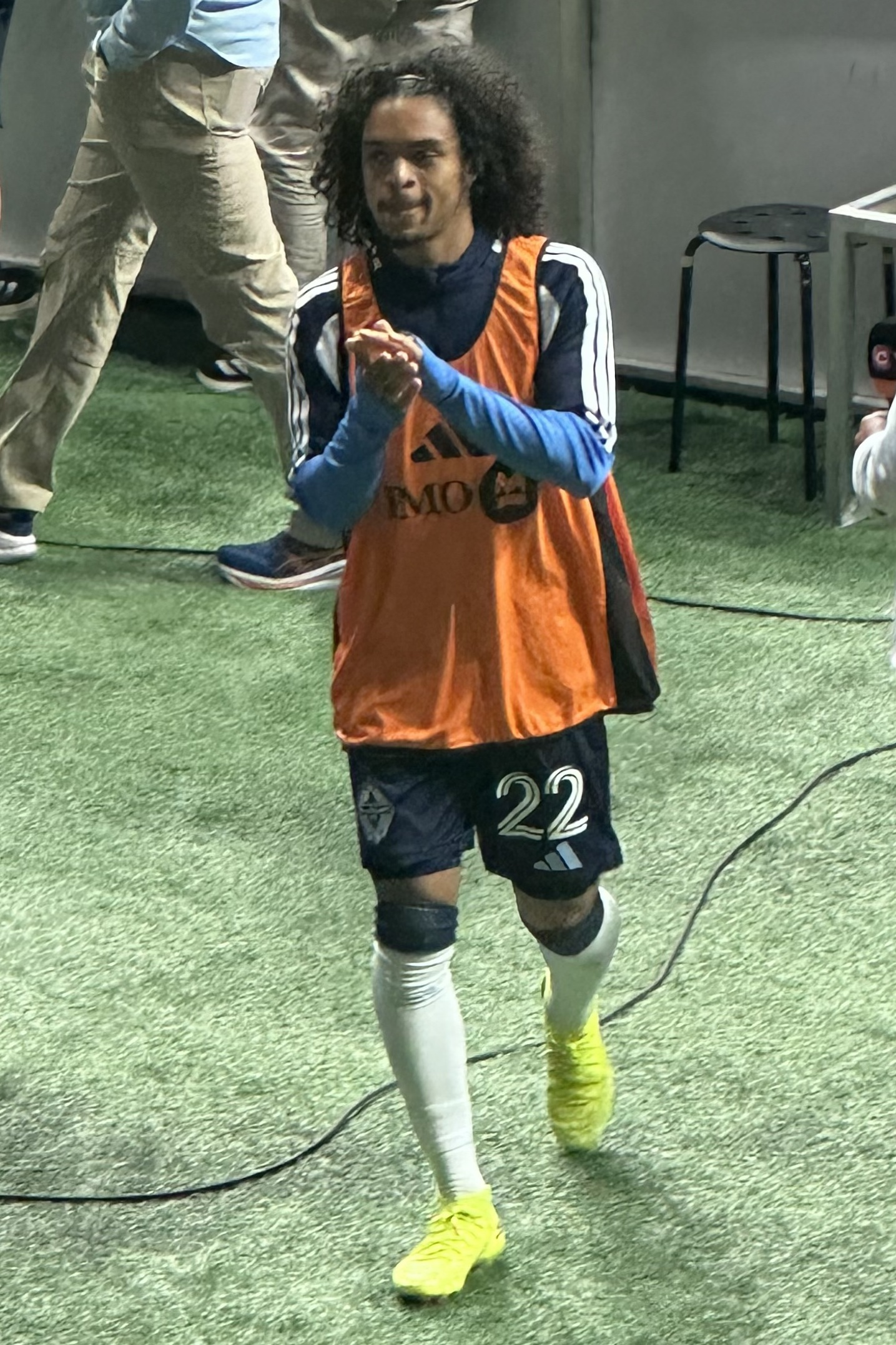
- Jackson in 2026

Personal information
- Full name: Aziel Christopher Jackson
- Date of birth: October 25, 2001 (age 25)
- Place of birth: New York City, New York, US
- Height: 5 ft 9 in (1.76 m)
- Position: Attacking midfielder

Team information
- Current team: Minnesota United (on loan from Jagiellonia Białystok)
- Number: 16

Youth career
- 2014–2017: New York Red Bulls
- 2017–2018: Toulouse
- 2019–2020: Crossfire FC

Senior career*
| Years | Team | Apps | (Gls) |
| 2018–2019 | Blagnac | 4 | (0) |
| 2021–2022 | Minnesota United | 0 | (0) |
| 2021 | → North Carolina FC (loan) | 12 | (1) |
| 2022 | Minnesota United 2 | 23 | (10) |
| 2023–2024 | St. Louis City SC | 41 | (1) |
| 2023 | St. Louis City 2 | 8 | (1) |
| 2024–2025 | Columbus Crew | 27 | (4) |
| 2024–2025 | Columbus Crew 2 | 1 | (0) |
| 2025– | Jagiellonia Białystok | 6 | (0) |
| 2025 | Jagiellonia Białystok II | 1 | (0) |
| 2026 | → Vancouver Whitecaps (loan) | 10 | (1) |
| 2026– | → Minnesota United (loan) | 10 | (1) |

International career
| 2024 | United States | 1 | (0) |
- * Club domestic league appearances and goals as of November 20, 2026

Aziel Christopher Jackson (born October 25, 2001), also known as AZ, is an American professional soccer player who plays as an attacking midfielder for Major League Soccer club Minnesota United, on loan from Ekstraklasa club Jagiellonia Białystok.

== Club career ==
=== Youth ===
Jackson joined the New York Red Bulls academy in 2014, where he played until 2017. In 2017, he moved with his family to France, subsequently joining the Toulouse academy until 2018. He also spent time with Championnat National 3 side Blagnac. In 2019, he returned to the United States, joining the Crossfire FC academy, as well as training with Seattle Sounders FC in 2020.

=== Minnesota United ===
On April 30, 2021, Jackson signed a homegrown player contract with Major League Soccer club Minnesota United FC, who acquired his rights from New York Red Bulls in exchange for a third-round pick in the 2022 MLS SuperDraft. On August 24, 2021, Jackson was loaned to USL League One side North Carolina FC.

On March 23, 2022, it was announced Jackson would spend the season with Minnesota United FC 2, the club's MLS Next Pro side.

=== St. Louis City ===
On November 7, 2022, Jackson was traded to St. Louis City SC in exchange for $150,000 of General Allocation Money ahead of the club's inaugural MLS season.

==== St. Louis City 2 ====
On March 26, 2023, Jackson was on loan from his first team St. Louis City SC and he made his debut against Tacoma Defiance.

=== Columbus Crew ===
On June 18, 2024, Jackson was traded to Columbus Crew in exchange for a guaranteed $650,000 in General Allocation Money. St. Louis could also receive another $250,000 in conditional General Allocation Money and maintain a sell-on percentage if Jackson is sold outside of MLS. Jackson made his first appearance for the club on July 20 as a substitute in a 2–1 loss to Atlanta United, and scored his first goal for the Columbus Crew on September 21 in a 4–3 win over Orlando City.

=== Jagiellonia Białystok ===
On July 23, 2025, Polish Ekstraklasa club Jagiellonia Białystok signed Jackson on a three-year deal, with an option for a fourth year, for an undisclosed fee. He made his debut for the club off of the bench in a 3–2 win over Widzew Łódź on July 27.

==== Loan to Vancouver Whitecaps ====
On January 30, 2026, Jackson returned to Major League Soccer, joining Vancouver Whitecaps on a five-month loan with an option to buy. On February 21, 2026, Jackson scored the winning goal in his debut MLS match for Vancouver.

==== Loan to Minnesota United ====
On August 13, 2026, Jackson rejoined Minnesota United on loan with a purchase option.

== International career ==
Jackson made his debut for the senior United States national team on January 20, 2024, in a friendly against Slovenia.

== Career statistics ==
=== Club ===
As of match played November 7, 2026

Appearances and goals by club, season and competition
| Club | Season | League | | | National cup (Note: Includes U.S. Open Cup) | | Continental | | Other | | Total | |
| Club | Season | Division | Apps | Goals | Apps | Goals | Apps | Goals | Apps | Goals | Apps | Goals |
|---|---|---|---|---|---|---|---|---|---|---|---|---|
| Blagnac | 2018–19 | Championnat National 3 | 4 | 0 | — | | — | | — | | 4 | 0 |
| Minnesota United | 2021 | MLS | 0 | 0 | — | | — | | 0 | 0 | 0 | 0 |
| Minnesota United | 2022 | MLS | 0 | 0 | 2 | 0 | — | | 0 | 0 | 2 | 0 |
| Minnesota United | Total | | 0 | 0 | 2 | 0 | — | | 0 | 0 | 2 | 0 |
| North Carolina FC (loan) | 2021 | USL League One | 12 | 1 | — | | — | | — | | 12 | 1 |
| Minnesota United 2 | 2022 | MLS Next Pro | 23 | 10 | — | | — | | — | | 23 | 10 |
| St. Louis City SC | 2023 | MLS | 25 | 1 | 2 | 2 | 2 (Note: Appearance(s) in Leagues Cup) | 0 | 2 (Note: Appearance(s) in MLS Cup playoffs) | 0 | 31 | 3 |
| St. Louis City SC | 2024 | MLS | 16 | 0 | 0 | 0 | 2 (Note: Appearance(s) in CONCACAF Champions Cup) | 0 | — | | 18 | 0 |
| St. Louis City SC | Total | | 41 | 1 | 2 | 2 | 4 | 0 | 2 | 0 | 49 | 3 |
| St. Louis City 2 | 2023 | MLS Next Pro | 8 | 1 | — | | — | | 0 | 0 | 8 | 1 |
| Columbus Crew 2 | 2024 | MLS Next Pro | 1 | 0 | — | | — | | 0 | 0 | 1 | 0 |
| Columbus Crew | 2024 | MLS | 9 | 2 | 0 | 0 | 1 (Note: Appearance(s) in Campeones Cup) | 0 | 1 | 0 | 11 | 2 |
| Columbus Crew | 2025 | MLS | 18 | 2 | 0 | 0 | 2 | 0 | — | | 21 | 2 |
| Columbus Crew | Total | | 27 | 4 | 0 | 0 | 3 | 0 | 1 | 0 | 31 | 4 |
| Jagiellonia Białystok | 2025–26 | Ekstraklasa | 6 | 0 | 0 | 0 | 5 (Note: Appearances in UEFA Conference League) | 0 | — | | 11 | 0 |
| Jagiellonia Białystok II | 2025–26 | III liga, group I | 1 | 0 | — | | — | | — | | 1 | 0 |
| Vancouver Whitecaps (loan) | 2026 | MLS | 10 | 1 | — | | 4 | 0 | — | | 14 | 1 |
| Minnesota United (loan) | 2026 | MLS | 10 | 1 | — | | — | | — | | 10 | 1 |
| Career total | | | 143 | 19 | 4 | 2 | 16 | 0 | 3 | 0 | 166 | 21 |

=== International ===
As of match played January 20, 2024

Appearances and goals by national team and year
| National team | Year | Apps | Goals |
|---|---|---|---|
| United States | 2024 | 1 | 0 |
| Total | | 1 | 0 |

== Personal ==
Aziel is the son of jazz drummer and composer Ali Jackson Jr. His favorite player is Ronaldinho.

== Honors ==
St. Louis City SC

- Western Conference (regular season): 2023

Columbus Crew

- Leagues Cup: 2024

Individual

- MLS Next Pro Best XI: 2022
