= Jefferson Díaz =

Colombian footballer (born 2000)

Personal information
- Full name: Jefferson Abel Díaz Beleño
- Date of birth: 5 December 2000 (age 25)
- Place of birth: San Andrés, Colombia
- Height: 1.86 m (6 ft 1 in)
- Position: Centre-back

Team information
- Current team: Minnesota United
- Number: 28

Youth career
- Élite Capital
- 2017–2019: Real Cartagena

Senior career*
| Years | Team | Apps | (Gls) |
| 2017–2021 | Real Cartagena | 43 | (3) |
| 2022 | Valledupar | 25 | (2) |
| 2023–2024 | Deportivo Cali | 43 | (4) |
| 2024– | Minnesota United | 39 | (1) |
- * Club domestic league appearances and goals as of 14:51, 20 October 2024 (UTC)

Jefferson Abel Díaz Beleño (born 5 December 2000) is a Colombian professional footballer who plays as a centre-back for Major League Soccer side Minnesota United.

== Career ==
=== Real Cartagena ===
Born in San Andrés, Díaz began his career with Real Cartagena, as a forward. He made his first team debut on 3 July 2017, coming on as a second-half substitute in a 0–0 Categoría Primera B home draw against Unión Magdalena.

Mainly a backup option, Díaz scored his first senior goal on 4 March 2020, netting the equalizer a 1–1 home draw against Dépor in the Copa Colombia. He only started to feature regularly in the 2021 season, after manager Nilton Bernal converted him into a centre-back, but was released at the end of the year.

=== Valledupar ===
On 8 February 2022, Díaz moved to fellow second division side Valledupar. He immediately became a first-choice, and scored twice in 29 appearances overall during the year.

=== Deportivo Cali ===
In January 2023, Díaz signed for Categoría Primera A side Deportivo Cali, after a week on trial at the club. He made his debut in the category on 12 February, replacing Gustavo Ramírez late into a 1–1 away draw against Atlético Nacional.

Díaz scored his first goal in the top tier on 15 April 2023, netting his side's second in a 2–1 home win over Unión Magdalena.

=== Minnesota United ===
On 29 July 2024, Díaz joined Major League Soccer side Minnesota United on a three-year deal for an undisclosed fee.

== Career statistics ==
As of 14 July 2024

Appearances and goals by club, season and competition
| Club | Season | League | | | National cup (Note: Includes Copa Colombia) | | Continental | | Other | | Total | |
| Club | Season | Division | Apps | Goals | Apps | Goals | Apps | Goals | Apps | Goals | Apps | Goals |
|---|---|---|---|---|---|---|---|---|---|---|---|---|
| Real Cartagena | 2017 | Categoría Primera B | 5 | 0 | 0 | 0 | — | | — | | 5 | 0 |
| Real Cartagena | 2018 | Categoría Primera B | 0 | 0 | 1 | 0 | — | | — | | 1 | 0 |
| Real Cartagena | 2019 | Categoría Primera B | 1 | 0 | 0 | 0 | — | | — | | 1 | 0 |
| Real Cartagena | 2020 | Categoría Primera B | 13 | 1 | 4 | 1 | — | | — | | 17 | 2 |
| Real Cartagena | 2021 | Categoría Primera B | 24 | 2 | 2 | 0 | — | | — | | 26 | 2 |
| Real Cartagena | Total | | 43 | 3 | 7 | 1 | — | | — | | 50 | 4 |
| Valledupar | 2022 | Categoría Primera B | 25 | 2 | 4 | 0 | — | | — | | 29 | 2 |
| Deportivo Cali | 2023 | Categoría Primera A | 30 | 2 | 7 | 1 | — | | — | | 37 | 3 |
| Deportivo Cali | 2024 | Categoría Primera A | 13 | 2 | 0 | 0 | — | | — | | 13 | 2 |
| Deportivo Cali | Total | | 43 | 4 | 7 | 1 | — | | — | | 50 | 5 |
| Career total | | | 111 | 9 | 18 | 2 | 0 | 0 | 0 | 0 | 129 | 11 |
