= Cherrion Valerius =

Footballer (born 2005)

Personal information
- Date of birth: 22 September 2005 (age 21)
- Place of birth: Rotterdam, Netherlands
- Height: 1.92 m (6 ft 3 1/2 in)
- Position: Defender

Team information
- Current team: Minnesota United
- Number: 52

Youth career
- –2018: Spartaan'20
- 2018–2024: NAC Breda

Senior career*
Years	Team	Apps	(Gls)
2024–	NAC Breda	48	(0)
2026–	→ Minnesota United (loan)	1	(1)
- * Club domestic league appearances and goals as of 26 September 2026

Cherrion Valerius (born 22 September 2005) is a professional footballer who plays as defender for Major League Soccer side Minnesota United, on loan from NAC Breda. Valerius has been called up to the Curaçao national football team.

== Club career ==
From Rotterdam, he played for Spartaan'20 prior to joining the youth set-up of NAC Breda when he was thirteen years-old. In the 2022–23 season he captained the NAC U18 side.

In February 2024 he signed a three-and-half year professional contract with the club. He made his professional debut for NAC Breda in the Eerste Divisie against Jong PSV on 25 April 2024. Following the club's promotion to the Eredivisie he made seven further appearances for the first team at the start of the 2024–25 season. However, a knee injury that required surgery suffered in training in October 2024 ruled him out for the rest of the year.

On 3 September 2026, Valerius was loaned by Major League Soccer club Minnesota United until the end of 2026. Following the season, Minnesota exercised its option to make the transfer permanent.

== International career ==
He received his first call-up to the Curaçao national football team by head coach Dick Advocaat for their 2024–25 CONCACAF Nations League B matches against Saint Martin and Saint Lucia in September 2024.
