= Cameron Knowles =

New Zealand association footballer

Personal information
- Full name: Cameron Knowles
- Date of birth: 11 October 1982 (age 44)
- Place of birth: Auckland, New Zealand
- Height: 1.91 m (6 ft 3 in)
- Position: Centre-back

College career
Years	Team	Apps	(Gls)
2001–2004	Akron Zips		

Senior career*
Years	Team	Apps	(Gls)
2004	Chicago Fire Premier	14	(2)
2005–2006	Real Salt Lake	4	(0)
2007–2010	Portland Timbers	77	(2)
2011	Montreal Impact	8	(0)

International career^{‡}
1999	New Zealand U17	1	(0)

Managerial career
- 2018–2021: Portland Timbers 2
- 2021–2023: Minnesota United 2
- 2024: Minnesota United (interim)
- 2026–: Minnesota United
- * Club domestic league appearances and goals as of 20 October 2010 ‡ National team caps and goals as of 15 April 2010

Cameron Knowles (born 11 October 1982) is a New Zealand professional football coach and former player who is currently the head coach of MLS club Minnesota United.

== Playing career ==
=== College and amateur ===
Knowles played college soccer for the University of Akron, captaining the team his senior year. Knowles anchored an Akron defence that allowed only three goals in league play and recorded 13 shutouts in 2004. Knowles, a two-time All-Mid-American Conference (MAC) first-team selection led Akron to two MAC titles in 2002 and 2004 and helped Akron make four consecutive NCAA tournament appearances. He was selected to the All-MAC second team his freshman and sophomore seasons and voted Akron's Newcomer of the Year in 2001. In addition, Knowles was a College Soccer News All-Freshman Team honourable mention. A testament to his durability, Knowles played in 49 straight games during his career at Akron.

Knowles also played in the USL Premier Development League for Chicago Fire Premier making 14 appearances and scoring two goals in league play. In addition, Knowles scored 3 goals during the Fire's 2004 Lamar Hunt U.S. Open Cup campaign.

=== Professional ===
Knowles was drafted by Real Salt Lake of Major League Soccer in the fourth round of the 2005 MLS Supplemental Draft, becoming the first Akron Zip to be drafted by a Major League Soccer team. He made his professional debut on 22 June 2005 against the Los Angeles Galaxy and totalled 346 minutes in four matches his rookie season in MLS, but did not make an appearance at all in 2006 and was released at the end of the year.

Knowles signed with the Portland Timbers of the USL First Division in 2007, and played in all 28 regular-season matches in his debut season for the team, scoring two goals and being named as one of three finalists for the USL First Division Defender of the Year award. He started 29 of 30 matches for the Timbers in 2008 was named to the USL First Division All-League second team.

In August 2009 Knowles sustained a serious leg injury in Montreal that sidelined him for the rest of the season and part of 2010. Knowles was picked up on 26 July 2011, by the Montreal Impact. Knowles made 8 appearances for the Impact before retiring at the end of 2011. He was released by Montreal on 12 October 2011.

=== International ===
Knowles was selected in the New Zealand under 17 squad for the FIFA World Championships but did not participate in the tournament has he suffered a broken leg three weeks prior to the opening match.

== Coaching career ==
On 26 January 2012, the Portland Timbers of Major League Soccer announced the addition of Knowles to the coaching staff as an assistant under Head Coach John Spencer.

On 5 January 2024, Knowles was announced as the interim head coach for Minnesota United following the departure of Sean McAuley. After Eric Ramsay was named head coach, Knowles remained an assistant on Ramsay's staff through the 2024 and 2025 MLS seasons. On 12 January 2026, Knowles was named head coach for the Loons' 2026 season.

== Managerial statistics ==
As of 7 November 2026

Coaching record by team and tenure
Team	Nat	From	To	Record							
Team	Nat	From	To	P	W	D	L	GF	GA	GD	Win %
Minnesota United (interim)	(United States)	5 January 2024	10 March 2024	3	2	1	0	6	4	+2	66.67
Minnesota United	(United States)	12 January 2026	Present	39	12	13	14	62	66	−4	30.77
Total				42	14	14	14	68	69	−1	33.33

== Honours ==
Portland Timbers

- USL First Division Commissioner's Cup: 2009
