= Joaquín Pereyra (Argentine footballer) =

Argentine footballer (born 1998)

Personal information
- Full name: Joaquín Nicolás Pereyra
- Date of birth: 1 December 1998 (age 27)
- Place of birth: Paraná, Argentina
- Height: 1.87 m (6 ft 1 1/2 in)
- Position: Midfielder

Team information
- Current team: Minnesota United
- Number: 26

Youth career
- –2016: Rosario Central

Senior career*
Years	Team	Apps	(Gls)
2016–2022	Rosario Central	45	(1)
2020–2021	→ Famalicão (loan)	15	(0)
2021–2022	→ Atlético Tucumán (loan)	53	(2)
2023–2024	Atlético Tucumán	59	(2)
2024–	Minnesota United	35	(5)

International career
2017	Argentina U20	2	(0)
- * Club domestic league appearances and goals as of 15:27, 17 May 2025 (UTC)

Joaquín Nicolás Pereyra (born 1 December 1998) is an Argentine professional footballer who plays as a winger for Minnesota United.

== Club career ==
=== Rosario Central ===
Pereyra is a youth exponent from Rosario Central. He made his league debut on 28 February 2016 against CA Colón in a 3--0 away win. He replaced Walter Montoya after 80 minutes.

=== Famalicão ===
On 10 September 2020, the Portuguese top-tier club Famalicão announced that Pereyra had joined them on loan until the end of season.

=== Minnesota United ===
On 15 August 2024, Minnesota United announced they had signed the Argentine midfielder as a Designated Player on a three-and-a-half-year contract. On 17 May 2025, he scored and assisted Julian Gressel in a 3–0 win against St. Louis City.
