= Kelvin Yeboah =

Ghanaian-Italian footballer (born 2000)

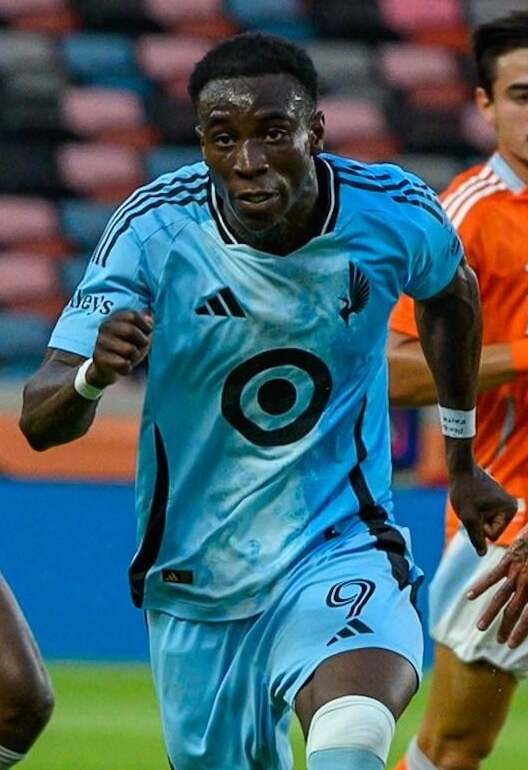
- Yeboah with Minnesota United in 2025

Personal information
- Full name: Kelvin Kwarteng Yeboah
- Date of birth: 6 May 2000 (age 26)
- Place of birth: Accra, Ghana
- Height: 1.82 m (6 ft 0 in)
- Position: Striker

Team information
- Current team: Minnesota United
- Number: 9

Youth career
- West Ham United
- Gozzano

Senior career*
Years	Team	Apps	(Gls)
2017–2018	AC London	19	(6)
2018–2021	WSG Tirol	56	(10)
2021–2022	Sturm Graz	34	(17)
2022–2024	Genoa	28	(1)
2023	→ FC Augsburg (loan)	13	(1)
2023–2024	→ Montpellier (loan)	13	(0)
2024	→ Standard Liège (loan)	14	(6)
2024–	Minnesota United	70	(34)

International career^{‡}
2021–2022	Italy U21	4	(0)
- * Club domestic league appearances and goals as of 23:22, 30 October 2026 (UTC) ‡ National team caps and goals as of 29 March 2022

Kelvin Kwarteng Yeboah (born 6 May 2000) is a professional footballer who plays as a forward for Major League Soccer club Minnesota United. Born in Ghana, Yeboah was a youth international for Italy.

He is the nephew of former Ghanaian international footballer Tony Yeboah.

== Club career ==
Yeboah joined the academy of Premier League side West Ham United before joining Italian Serie C side Gozzano academy. In November 2017, Yeboah held a trial with Danish Superliga side Aalborg BK training with their first team. Yeboah saw the rest of the 2017–18 season out with Combined Counties League Division One club AC London, scoring six league goals in 19 appearances.

On 19 June 2018, Yeboah signed for Austrian Bundesliga side WSG Tirol. He made his debut for the club in August 2019 against Austria Klagenfurt. He helped his club earn promotion to the Austrian Football Bundesliga after winning the Austrian Second Division for the 2018–19 season. After earning promotion, on 4 July 2019 Yeboah signed a new longer-term contract at WSG.

He made his first appearance in Bundesliga on 31 August 2019, playing in a 1–5 defeat against FC Salzburg, which included a goal from FC Salzburg striker Erling Haaland, whose father Alf-Inge Haaland had briefly been a teammate of Kelvin's uncle Tony at Leeds United in 1997.

On 25 September 2019, Yeboah came to prominence on a big stage, by scoring four goals in a single match for WSG Tirol in the 5–2 Austrian Cup victory against Austria Wien.

On 6 February 2021, Yeboah transferred to fellow Austrian Bundesliga side Sturm Graz, signing a contract until the summer of 2024.

On 8 January 2022, Yeboah joined Serie A club Genoa for an undisclosed fee. After suffering relegation with the Grifone and playing the first half of the season in Serie B, on 18 January 2023 Yeboah was loaned out to Bundesliga side FC Augsburg until the end of the season, with an option to buy.

On 1 September 2023, Yeboah joined Ligue 1 side Montpellier on loan for the remainder of the season, with an option to buy. On 1 February 2024, Yeboah moved on a new loan to Standard Liège in Belgium, with an option to buy.

On 27 July 2024, Yeboah joined Major League Soccer club Minnesota United on a three-and-a-half-year contract as a Designated Player with a club-side option of a further year.

== International career ==
Born in Accra, Yeboah grew up in Italy and is eligible to represent both countries at the international level though he is yet to be capped.

On 20 January 2019, Yeboah was called up to the Ghana's under-20s. On 13 August 2021, he was called up to the Ghana senior team ahead of 2022 FIFA World Cup qualifiers against Ethiopia and South Africa. On 27 August, he was called up by Italy's under-21 side. However he rejected the Ghanaian call-up and honoured the Italian under-21 call-up. On 3 September 2021, he made his debut with the Italy U21 squad, playing as a substitute in the qualifying match won 3–0 against Luxembourg.

== Career statistics ==
=== Club ===
As of match played 25 November 2025

Appearances and goals by club, season and competition
Club	Season	League			Cup		Continental		Other		Total	
Club	Season	Division	Apps	Goals	Apps	Goals	Apps	Goals	Apps	Goals	Apps	Goals
WSG Tirol	2018–19	2. Liga	16	2	1	0	—		—		17	2
WSG Tirol	2019–20	Austrian Bundesliga	25	4	4	4	—		—		29	8
WSG Tirol	2020–21	Austrian Bundesliga	15	4	2	0	—		—		17	4
WSG Tirol	Total		56	10	7	4	—		—		63	14
Sturm Graz	2020–21	Austrian Bundesliga	16	6	1	0	—		—		17	6
Sturm Graz	2021–22	Austrian Bundesliga	18	11	3	2	7	1	—		28	14
Sturm Graz	Total		34	17	4	2	7	1	—		45	20
Genoa	2021–22	Serie A	17	0	1	0	—		—		18	0
Genoa	2022–23	Serie B	11	1	2	0	—		—		13	1
Genoa	Total		28	1	3	0	0	0	0	0	31	1
FC Augsburg (loan)	2022–23	Bundesliga	13	1	—		—		—		13	1
Montpellier (loan)	2023–24	Ligue 1	13	0	2	1	—		—		15	1
Standard Liège (loan)	2023–24	Pro League	14	6	—		—		—		14	6
Minnesota United	2024	MLS	12	9	—		—		—		12	9
Minnesota United	2025	MLS	34	9	3	3	—		3	1	40	13
Minnesota United	Total		46	18	3	3	0	0	3	1	52	22
Career total			204	53	19	10	7	1	3	1	233	65

== Honours ==
WSG Swarovski Tirol

- Austrian Second Division: 2018–19
