= Minnesota United FC 2 =

MNUFC2
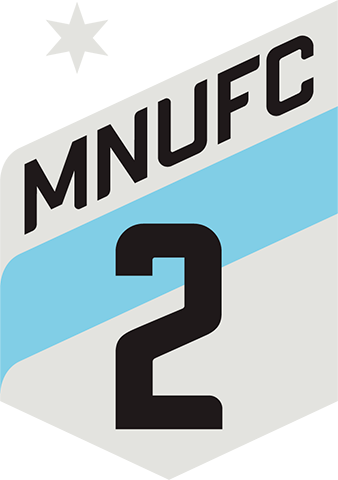
- Founded: December 6, 2021; 4 years ago
- Stadium: National Sports Center; Blaine, Minnesota
- Capacity: 5,500
- Head coach: Fanendo Adi
- League: MLS Next Pro
- 2025: 11th, Western Conference; Playoffs: Conference Finals
- Website: https://www.mnufc.com/mnufc2/
Home colors	Away colors

MNUFC2 is an American professional soccer team that is located in Blaine, Minnesota. It is the reserve team of Minnesota United FC and participates in MLS Next Pro.

== History ==
On December 6, 2021, MNUFC2 were named as one of 21 clubs that would field a team in the new MLS Next Pro league beginning in the 2022 season.

== Players and staff ==
=== Roster ===
As of June 13, 2026

Note: Flags indicate national team as defined under FIFA eligibility rules; some limited exceptions apply. Players may hold more than one non-FIFA nationality.

No.	Pos.	Nation	Player
32	FW	NZL	Troy Putt
36	MF	USA	Jakob Friedman
38	MF	USA	Kage Romanshyn Jr.
39	FW	USA	Luke Hille
41	DF	USA	Nick Dang
43	MF	USA	Luciano Pechota

No.	Pos.	Nation	Player
90	MF	USA	Luciano Pechota
92	MF	SLE	Alpha Kabia
95	FW	USA	Sam Vigilante
98	GK	LVA	Kristers Bite
—	DF	PER	Kluiverth Aguilar

Signed to first team contract with Minnesota United
Minnesota United FC Academy player.

=== Out On Loan ===
Note: Flags indicate national team as defined under FIFA eligibility rules; some limited exceptions apply. Players may hold more than one non-FIFA nationality.

No.	Pos.	Nation	Player
34	MF	USA	Curt Calov (on loan to San Antonio FC)
37	MF	SEN	Babacar Niang (on loan to Louisville City)

No.	Pos.	Nation	Player
91	FW	USA	Logan Dorsey (on loan to FC Tulsa)
93	MF	SLE	Momoh Kamara (on loan to IF Elfsborg)

=== Staff ===
Coaching staff
Head coach	Fanendo Adi
Assistant coach	Nathan Smith
Goalkeeper coach	Cristiano Costa

== Team records ==
=== Year-by-year ===
As of January 18, 2026

Season	MLS Next Pro									Playoffs	Top Scorer	
Season	P	W	D	L	GF	GA	Pts	Conference	Overall	Playoffs	Player	Goals
2022	24	9	5	10	43	39	36	6th, Western	11th	Did not qualify	(United States) Aziel Jackson	10
2023	28	10	8	10	50	52	43	8th, Western	13th	Did not qualify	(Jamaica) Kameron Lacey	10
2024	28	8	4	16	43	73	32	13th, Western	25th	Did not qualify	(Liberia) Patrick Weah	8
2025	28	12	6	10	45	42	44	5th, Western	11th	Conference Finals	(United States) Logan Dorsey (United States) Luke Hille	10

=== Head coaches record ===
As of September 24, 2023

Name	Nationality	From	To	P	W	D	L	GF	GA	Win%
Cameron Knowles	New Zealand	December 6, 2021	present	52	19	13	20	93	91	36.54

== See also ==
- MLS Next Pro
