= 2025 Minnesota United FC season =

Minnesota United FC
2025 season
- Owner: Bill McGuire
- Head coach: Eric Ramsay
- Stadium: Allianz Field
- Major League Soccer: Conference: 4th Overall: 8th
- MLS Cup Playoffs: Conference Semifinals
- U.S. Open Cup: Semifinals
- Leagues Cup: League Phase
- Top goalscorer: League: Tani Oluwaseyi (10); All: Kelvin Yeboah (13); Anthony Markanich (13)
- Highest home attendance: 19,784 vs SKC (10/4, MLS)
- Lowest home attendance: 3,325 vs STL (3/29, USOC)
- Average home league attendance: 19,214
- Biggest win: 3-0 at ATX (5/3, MLS); 4-1 vs MIA (5/10, MLS); 3-0 vs STL (5/17, MLS); 4-1 vs SJ (7/12, MLS); 4-1 vs QRO (7/30, LC); 3-0 vs SKC (10/4, MLS)
- Biggest defeat: 0-3 vs CHI (9/20, MLS)
Home colors	Away colors	Third colors

The 2025 Minnesota United FC season was the club's sixteenth season of existence, and ninth in Major League Soccer. Their season began on February 22, 2025, where they faced Los Angeles FC in Los Angeles, California. The club played its home matches at Allianz Field in Saint Paul, Minnesota.

An analysis by Soccerment found that Minnesota United FC took the most deep free kicks and long throw-ins of any professional men's team in the top 30 leagues in the world.

== Technical staff ==
As of March 13, 2024

Position	Name
Chief soccer officer and sporting director	(Lebanon) Khaled El-Ahmad
Head coach	(Wales) Eric Ramsay
Assistant coach	(New Zealand) Cameron Knowles
Assistant coach	(Trinidad and Tobago) Dennis Lawrence
Goalkeeping coach	(England) Thomas Fawdry

== Roster ==
As of October 23rd, 2025

No.	Name	Nationality	Position(s)	Date of birth (age)	Height	Signed In	Signed from	Transfer Fee	Contract start	Contract Length	Ref.
Goalkeepers
1	Alec Smir	USA	GK	April 13, 1999 (age 26)	6 ft 2 in	2024	(United States) Minnesota United FC 2	Free	2024	1+2	
96	Wessel Speel (on loan at Shelbourne F.C.)	NED	GK	October 17, 2001 (age 24)	6 ft 7 in	2025	(United States) Minnesota United FC 2	Free	2025	1+2	
97	Dayne St. Clair	CAN	GK	May 9, 1997 (age 28)	6 ft 3 in	2019	(United States) Maryland Terrapins	Draft	2022	3+1	
Defenders
2	Devin Padelford (HGP) (on loan at St. Louis City SC)	USA	DF	January 3, 2003 (age 23)	6 ft 0 in	2022	(United States) MNUFC Academy	Free	2022	3+2	
5	Nicolás Romero (INT) (U22)	ARG	DF	November 28, 2003 (age 22)	6 ft 1 in	2025	(Argentina) Atlético Tucumán	$2M	2025	3+1	
12	Kipp Keller (on loan at New Mexico United)	USA	DF	July 14, 2000 (age 25)	6 ft 1 in	2025	(United States) FC Cincinnati	Re-Entry Draft	2024	1+3	
13	Anthony Markanich	USA	DF	December 26, 1999 (age 26)	6 ft 1 in	2024	(United States) St. Louis City SC	Trade	2025	4+1	
15	Michael Boxall	NZL	DF	August 18, 1988 (age 37)	6 ft 2 in	2017	(South Africa) SuperSport United	Free	2024	2+1	
18	Matúš Kmeť (on loan at Górnik Zabrze)	SVK	DF	June 27, 2000 (age 25)	5 ft 8 in	2024	(Slovakia) AS Trenčín	$630K	2024	3+1	
23	Morris Duggan (INT)	GER	DF	October 24, 2000 (age 25)	6 ft 4 in	2024	(United States) Marshall Thundering Herd	Draft	2024	1+3	
27	DJ Taylor	USA	DF	August 26, 1997 (age 28)	5 ft 9 in	2021	(United States) North Carolina FC	Free	2024	2+1	
28	Jefferson Díaz (INT)	COL	DF	December 5, 2000 (age 25)	6 ft 1 in	2024	(Colombia) Deportivo Cali	$700K	2024	4+1	
33	Kieran Chandler	USA	DF	June 9, 2005 (age 20)	5 ft 9 in	2025	(United States) Minnesota United FC 2	Free	2025	2+2	
67	Carlos Harvey	PAN	DF	February 3, 2000 (age 26)	6 ft 1 in	2024	(United States) Phoenix Rising FC	Undisclosed	2025	4+1	
Midfielders
7	Dominik Fitz (INT)	AUT	MF	June 16, 1999 (age 26)	5 ft 9 in	2025	FK Austria Wien	Undisclosed	2025	5+1	
8	Joseph Rosales	HON	MF	November 6, 2000 (age 25)	5 ft 11 in	2021	(Panama) Independiente	Undisclosed	2025	3+1	
16	Alexis Fariña (INT) (on loan from Cerro Porteño)	PAR	MF	December 17, 2004 (age 21)	5 ft 7 in	2025	(Paraguay) Cerro Porteño	Loan	2025	1 + Option to Buy	
17	Robin Lod	FIN	MF	April 17, 1993 (age 32)	5 ft 11 in	2019	(Spain) Sporting Gijón	$500K	2023	3+1	
20	Wil Trapp	USA	MF	January 15, 1993 (age 33)	5 ft 8 in	2021	(United States) Inter Miami CF	Free	2025	1+1	
22	Jeong Ho-yeon (INT)	KOR	MF	September 28, 2000 (age 25)	5 ft 11 in	2025	(South Korea) Gwangju FC	$1M	2025	3+1	
24	Julian Gressel	USA	MF	December 16, 1993 (age 32)	6 ft 0 in	2025	(United States) Inter Miami CF	Waivers	2024	3+1	
25	Nectarios Triantis (INT) (U22)	GRE	MF	May 11, 2003 (age 22)	6 ft 3 in	2025	(England) Sunderland A.F.C.	Undisclosed	2025	5+1	
26	Joaquín Pereyra (DP)	ARG	MF	December 1, 1998 (age 27)	6 ft 1 in	2024	(Argentina) Atlético Tucumán	Undisclosed	2025	4+1	
30	Owen Gene (INT) (U22)	FRA	MF	March 19, 2003 (age 22)	6 ft 1 in	2025	(France) Amiens SC	$2M	2025	3+1	
31	Hassani Dotson	USA	MF	August 6, 1997 (age 28)	5 ft 11 in	2019	(United States) Oregon State Beavers	Draft	2022	3+1	
90	Loïc Mesanvi	TOG	MF	October 6, 2003 (age 22)	5 ft 8 in	2024	(United States) Minnesota United FC 2	Free	2024	2+2	
Forwards
9	Kelvin Yeboah (DP) (INT)	ITA	FW	May 6, 2000 (age 25)	6 ft 0 in	2024	(Italy) Genoa CFC	$3.2M	2024	4+1	
19	Samuel Shashoua (on loan at Birmingham Legion FC)	ENG	FW	May 13, 1999 (age 26)	5 ft 7 in	2024	(Spain) Albacete Balompié	Free	2024	1+2	
21	Bongokuhle Hlongwane	RSA	FW	June 20, 2000 (age 25)	6 ft 1 in	2022	(South Africa) Maritzburg United	$500K	2025	3+1	
29	Mamadou Dieng (INT)	SEN	FW	February 4, 2004 (age 22)	6 ft 2 in	2025	(United States) Hartford Athletic	Undisclosed	2025	2+2	
98	Darius Randell (HGP)	LBR	FW	August 25, 2007 (age 18)	6 ft 0 in	2025	(United States) Minnesota United FC 2	Free	2025	2+2	
99	Jordan Adebayo-Smith (on loan at Detroit City FC)	USA	FW	January 11, 2001 (age 25)	5 ft 11 in	2024	(United States) New England Revolution II	Trade	2024	3+1	
	Kenyel Michel (on loan at Alajuelense)	CRC	FW	September 17, 2004 (age 21)	5 ft 7 in	2025	(Costa Rica) Alajuelense	Undisclosed	2025	3+1	

== Transfers ==
=== Transfers in ===
Date	Position	No.	Player	From club	Notes	Ref.
December 13, 2024	DF	12	(United States) Kipp Keller	(United States) FC Cincinnati	Re-Entry Draft	
January 30, 2025	DF	5	(Argentina) Nicolás Romero	(Argentina) Atlético Tucumán	Transfer	
February 1, 2025	MF	22	(South Korea) Jeong Ho-yeon	(South Korea) Gwangju FC	Transfer	
February 11, 2025	MF	30	(France) Owen Gene	(France) Amiens SC	Transfer	
April 29, 2025	MF	24	(United States) Julian Gressel	(United States) Inter Miami CF	Waivers	
May 31, 2025	FW	98	(Liberia) Darius Randell	(United States) Minnesota United FC 2	Homegrown Contract	
June 28, 2025	GK	96	(Netherlands) Wessel Speel	(United States) Minnesota United FC 2	First Team Contract	
August 21, 2025	MF	7	(Austria) Dominik Fitz	FK Austria Wien	Transfer	
August 22, 2025	MF	25	(Greece) Nectarios Triantis	(England) Sunderland A.F.C.	Transfer	
August 22, 2025	FW	29	(Senegal) Mamadou Dieng	(United States) Hartford Athletic	Transfer	
August 22, 2025	FW		(Costa Rica) Kenyel Michel	(Costa Rica) Liga Deportiva Alajuelense	Transfer	
August 23, 2025	DF	33	(United States) Kieran Chandler	(United States) Minnesota United FC 2	First Team Contract	

=== MLS SuperDraft ===
Round	Pick	Player	Position	Previous club	Status	Ref
1	25	(United States) Roman Torres	Midfielder	Creighton	Signed with Minnesota United FC 2	
2	43	(United States) Kieran Chandler	Defender	UConn	Signed with Minnesota United FC 2	
2	45	(United States) Logan Dorsey	Forward	Kentucky	Signed with Minnesota United FC 2	
3	85	(United States) Nick Collins	Defender	Rutgers	Returned to School	

=== Transfers out ===
Date	Position	No.	Player	To club	Notes	Ref.
November 28, 2024	GK	1	(United States) Clint Irwin	Free Agent	Option Declined	
November 28, 2024	DF	3	(Puerto Rico) Zarek Valentin	Retired	Retired	
November 28, 2024	DF	12	(United States) Derek Dodson	(United States) D.C. United	Option Declined	
November 28, 2024	DF	24	(Spain) Hugo Bacharach	(United States) Rhode Island FC	Option Declined	
November 28, 2024	MF	44	(United States) Moses Nyeman	(United States) Loudoun United FC	Option Declined	
November 28, 2024	FW	7	(Argentina) Franco Fragapane	(Argentina) Unión de Santa Fe	Out of Contract	
November 28, 2024	FW	29	(United States) Patrick Weah	(United States) Atlanta United 2	Option Declined	
December 17, 2024	DF	4	(Mexico) Miguel Tapias	(Mexico) C.D. Guadalajara	Transfer	
January 24, 2025	FW	22	(Finland) Teemu Pukki	(Finland) HJK	Transfer	
February 4, 2025	DF	5	(Saint Kitts and Nevis) Ethan Bristow	(England) Tranmere Rovers F.C.	Mutual Contract Termination	
July 21, 2025	FW	7	(South Korea) Jeong Sang-bin	(United States) St. Louis City SC	Trade	
August 29, 2025	FW	14	(Canada) Tani Oluwaseyi	(Spain) Villarreal CF	Transfer	
September 19, 2025	MF	25	(Costa Rica) Alejandro Bran	(Costa Rica) Liga Deportiva Alajuelense	Purchase Option	

=== Loans in ===
Start date	End date	Position	No.	Player	From club	Notes	Ref.
Short-Term March 22		GK	94	(United States) Kayne Rizanovich	(United States) Minnesota United FC 2		
Short-Term March 22		FW	98	(Liberia) Darius Randell	(United States) Minnesota United FC 2		
Short-Term May 3		FW	98	(Liberia) Darius Randell	(United States) Minnesota United FC 2		
Short-Term May 7		FW	98	(Liberia) Darius Randell	(United States) Minnesota United FC 2		
Short-Term May 7		GK	96	(Netherlands) Wessel Speel	(United States) Minnesota United FC 2		
Short-Term May 7		DF	35	(United States) Britton Fischer	(United States) Minnesota United FC 2		
Short-Term May 7		DF	36	(Kenya) Kisa Kiingi	(United States) Minnesota United FC 2		
Short-Term May 7		MF	34	(United States) Curt Calov	(United States) Minnesota United FC 2		
Short-Term May 7		MF	37	(Senegal) Babacar Niang	(United States) Minnesota United FC 2		
Short-Term May 7		FW	39	(United States) Luke Hille	(United States) Minnesota United FC 2		
Short-Term May 7		FW	95	(Ethiopia) Muba Nour	(United States) Minnesota United FC 2		
Short-Term May 7		DF	33	(United States) Kieran Chandler	(United States) Minnesota United FC 2		
Short-Term May 14		DF	33	(United States) Kieran Chandler	(United States) Minnesota United FC 2		
Short-Term May 21		GK	96	(Netherlands) Wessel Speel	(United States) Minnesota United FC 2		
Short-Term May 28		FW	98	(Liberia) Darius Randell	(United States) Minnesota United FC 2		
Short-Term June 14		GK	96	(Netherlands) Wessel Speel	(United States) Minnesota United FC 2		
Short-Term June 25		GK	96	(Netherlands) Wessel Speel	(United States) Minnesota United FC 2		
Short-Term July 8		GK	94	(United States) Kayne Rizanovich	(United States) Minnesota United FC 2		
Short-Term July 26		FW	39	(United States) Luke Hille	(United States) Minnesota United FC 2		
Short-Term August 6		FW	39	(United States) Luke Hille	(United States) Minnesota United FC 2		
August 22	End of 2025 Season	MF	16	(Paraguay) Alexis Fariña	(Paraguay) Cerro Porteño	Option to Buy	

=== Loans out ===
Start date	End date	Position	No.	Player	To club	Notes	Ref.
January 5, 2025	End of 2025 Season	MF	25	(Costa Rica) Alejandro Bran	(Costa Rica) Liga Deportiva Alajuelense	Option to Buy	
February 6, 2025	End of 2025 Season	DF	18	(Slovakia) Matúš Kmeť	(Poland) Górnik Zabrze	Option to Buy	
March 14, 2025	End of 2025 Season	FW	99	(United States) Jordan Adebayo-Smith	(United States) Detroit City FC		
July 19, 2025	End of 2025 Season	FW	19	(England) Samuel Shashoua	(United States) Birmingham Legion FC	Right to Recall	
July 22, 2025	End of 2025 Season	DF	2	(United States) Devin Padelford	(United States) St. Louis City SC		
July 23, 2025	End of 2025 Season	GK	96	(Netherlands) Wessel Speel	(Republic of Ireland) Shelbourne F.C.		
August 22, 2025	End of 2025 Season	DF	12	(United States) Kipp Keller	(United States) New Mexico United	Right to Recall	
August 22, 2025	End of 2025 Season	FW		(Costa Rica) Kenyel Michel	(Costa Rica) Liga Deportiva Alajuelense		

== Friendlies ==
Win Draw Loss
On January 17, Minnesota United announced a midseason friendly against German Bundesliga club Holstein Kiel.

January 29 Preseason	Real Salt Lake	1–1	Minnesota United FC	Santa Barbara, California
12:40 PM CT	Ajago 90'		Pereyra 15'

February 9 CVI	Sporting Kansas City	0–6	Minnesota United FC	Indio, California
1:30 PM CT		Report	Oluwaseyi 10', 24'; Pereyra 12'; Rosales 18'; Yeboah 45', 58'	Stadium: Empire Polo Club

February 12 CVI	LA Galaxy	2–1	Minnesota United FC	Indio, California
1:00 PM CT	Lepley 50', 58'	Report	Markanich 69'	Stadium: Empire Polo Club

February 15 CVI	New York City FC	1–0	Minnesota United FC	Indio, California
1:00 PM CT				Stadium: Empire Polo Club

July 7 Midseason	Minnesota United FC	0–0	Holstein Kiel	St. Paul, Minnesota
7:00 PM CT				Stadium: Allianz Field

== Competitions ==
=== MLS regular season ===
==== Standings ====
===== Overall =====
Overall MLS standings table (2025)
Pos	Team	Pld	W	L	T	GF	GA	GD	Pts	Qualification
6	Los Angeles FC	34	17	8	9	65	40	+25	60	Qualification for the CONCACAF Champions Cup Round one (Note: As third highest-ranked club in 2025 MLS Supporters' Shield not already qualified)
7	Charlotte FC	34	19	13	2	55	46	+9	59	
8	Minnesota United FC	34	16	8	10	56	39	+17	58	
9	New York City FC	34	17	12	5	50	44	+6	56	
10	Seattle Sounders FC (L)	34	15	9	10	58	48	+10	55	Qualification for the CONCACAF Champions Cup Round of 16 (Note: As winners of Leagues Cup)

Source: MLS
Rules for classification: 1) points; 2) total wins; 3) total goal differential; 4) total goals scored; 5) fewer disciplinary points; 6) away goal differential; 7) away goals scored; 8) home goals differential; 9) home goals scored; 10) coin toss (2 clubs tied) or drawing of lots (≥3 clubs tied)
(L) Leagues Cup winners

===== Western Conference =====
MLS Western Conference table (2025)
Pos	Team	Pld	W	L	T	GF	GA	GD	Pts	Qualification
1	San Diego FC	34	19	9	6	64	41	+23	63	Qualification for round one and the CONCACAF Champions Cup round one
2	Vancouver Whitecaps FC	34	18	7	9	66	38	+28	63	Qualification for round one
3	Los Angeles FC	34	17	8	9	65	40	+25	60	Qualification for round one
4	Minnesota United FC	34	16	8	10	56	39	+17	58	Qualification for round one
5	Seattle Sounders FC	34	15	9	10	58	48	+10	55	Qualification for round one
6	Austin FC	34	13	13	8	37	45	−8	47	Qualification for round one
7	FC Dallas	34	11	12	11	52	55	−3	44	Qualification for round one
8	Portland Timbers	34	11	12	11	41	48	−7	44	Qualification for the wild-card round
9	Real Salt Lake	34	12	17	5	38	49	−11	41	Qualification for the wild-card round
10	San Jose Earthquakes	34	11	15	8	60	63	−3	41	
11	Colorado Rapids	34	11	15	8	44	56	−12	41	
12	Houston Dynamo FC	34	9	15	10	43	56	−13	37	
13	St. Louis City SC	34	8	18	8	44	58	−14	32	

Source: MLS
Rules for classification: 1) points; 2) total wins; 3) total goal differential; 4) total goals scored; 5) fewer disciplinary points; 6) away goal differential; 7) away goals scored; 8) home goals differential; 9) home goals scored; 10) coin toss (2 clubs tied) or drawing of lots (≥3 clubs tied)

==== Results summary ====
Overall								Home						Away					
Pld	Pts	W	L	T	GF	GA	GD	W	L	T	GF	GA	GD	W	L	T	GF	GA	GD
34	58	16	8	10	56	39	+17	8	5	4	29	20	+9	8	3	6	27	19	+8

Last updated: October 18th, 2025
Source: MLS Results
Pld = Matches played; Pts = Points; W = Matches won; T = Matches tied; L = Matches lost; GF = Goals for; GA = Goals against; GD = Goal difference

==== Regular season ====
February 22 1	Los Angeles FC	1–0	Minnesota United FC	Los Angeles, California
3:30 PM CT	Ebobisse 78'	Report	Boxall (yellow card) 39'; Dotson (yellow card) 74'	Stadium: BMO Stadium; Attendance: 22,130; Referee: Guido Gonzales Jr.

March 1 2	Minnesota United FC	1–0	CF Montréal	St. Paul, Minnesota
7:30 PM CT	Oluwaseyi (yellow card) 49'; Yeboah 69'	Report	Jabang (yellow card) 43'; Marshall-Rutty (yellow card) 67'	Stadium: Allianz Field; Attendance: 17,745; Referee: Sergii Demianchuk

March 8 3	San Jose Earthquakes	0–1	Minnesota United FC	San Jose, California
9:30 PM CT	Leroux (yellow card) 61'	Report	Yeboah 33'; Dotson (yellow card) 45'	Stadium: PayPal Park; Attendance: 16,102; Referee: Ricardo Fierro

March 15 4	Sporting Kansas City	3–3	Minnesota United FC	Kansas City, Kansas
7:00 PM CT	Leibold (yellow card) 64'; Sallói 68'; Duggan 72' (o.g.); Joveljić 80'	Report	Oluwaseyi (yellow card) 6', (goal) 31', 46'; Dotson 15'	Stadium: Children's Mercy Park; Attendance: 14,867; Referee: Joe Dickerson

March 22 5	Minnesota United FC	2–2	LA Galaxy	St. Paul, Minnesota
3:30 PM CT	Jeong Sang-bin (yellow card) 12'; Yeboah 19', 87' (pen.); Romero (yellow card) 73'	Report	Ramírez 26'; Pec (yellow card) 45+2'; Wynder (yellow card) 56'; Fagúndez (yellow card) 69'; Garcés 90'	Stadium: Allianz Field; Attendance: 19,607; Referee: Chris Penso

March 29 6	Minnesota United FC	2–0	Real Salt Lake	St. Paul, Minnesota
7:30 PM CT	Oluwaseyi 30', 55'; Pereyra (yellow card) 32'; St. Clair (yellow card) 80'	Report	Brook (yellow card) 82'; Ruiz (yellow card) 90+3'	Stadium: Allianz Field; Attendance: 17,124; Referee: Victor Rivas

April 6 7	New York City FC	1–2	Minnesota United FC	New York City, New York
4:00 PM CT	Risa (yellow card) 36'; Parks 89'	Report	Oluwaseyi 2'; Trapp 29'; Boxall (yellow card) 43'; St. Clair (yellow card) 82'	Stadium: Yankee Stadium; Attendance: 18,279; Referee: Sergii Boiko

April 12 8	Toronto FC	0–0	Minnesota United FC	Toronto, Ontario
1:30 PM CT	Insigne (yellow card) 32'	Report	Hlongwane (yellow card) 17'; Díaz (yellow card) 84'	Stadium: BMO Field; Attendance: 22,149; Referee: Malik Badawi

April 19 9	Minnesota United FC	0–0	FC Dallas	St. Paul, Minnesota
7:30 PM CT	Trapp (yellow card) 41'; Romero (yellow card) 58'; Oluwaseyi (yellow card) 65'; Rosales (yellow card) 68'	Report	Ramiro (yellow card) 35'; Norris (yellow card) 87'	Stadium: Allianz Field; Attendance: 19,607; Referee: Abdou Ndiaye

April 27 10	Minnesota United FC	1–3	Vancouver Whitecaps FC	St. Paul, Minnesota
7:30 PM CT	Trapp 80'	Report	Priso (yellow card) 9'; Berhalter 55' (yellow card) 77'; Vite 66', 70'	Stadium: Allianz Field; Attendance: 18,851; Referee: Drew Fischer
Note: Rescheduled from April 26 due to Vancouver Whitecaps FC making the 2025 CONCACAF Champions Cup semifinals.

May 3 11	Austin FC	0–3	Minnesota United FC	Austin, Texas
7:30 PM CT	Hines-Ike (yellow card) 69'	Report	Sánchez 22' (o.g.); Markanich 35'; Pereyra 90+1'	Stadium: Q2 Stadium; Attendance: 20,738; Referee: Armando Villarreal

May 10 12	Minnesota United FC	4–1	Inter Miami CF	St. Paul, Minnesota
3:30 PM CT	Hlongwane 32'; Boxall (yellow card) 45'; Markanich 45+2'; Weigandt 68' (o.g.); Lod 70'	Report	Messi 48'; Luján (yellow card) 80'	Stadium: Allianz Field; Attendance: 19,710; Referee: Filip Dujic

May 14 13	Houston Dynamo FC	2–0	Minnesota United FC	Houston, Texas
7:30 PM CT	Ortiz (yellow card) 40', (goal) 45+1'; Andrade 77'; Olusanya (yellow card) 89'; Urso (yellow card) 90'	Report	Lod (yellow card) 69'	Stadium: Shell Energy Stadium; Attendance: 14,266; Referee: Jon Freemon

May 17 14	Minnesota United FC	3–0	St. Louis City SC	St. Paul, Minnesota
7:30 PM CT	Pereyra (yellow card) 3', (goal) 62'; Oluwaseyi 33'; Gressel 78'	Report	Baumgartl (yellow card) 11'	Stadium: Allianz Field; Attendance: 19,643; Referee: Ricardo Fierro

May 24 15	Minnesota United FC	1–1	Austin FC	St. Paul, Minnesota
7:30 PM CT	Boxall 16'; Markanich (yellow card) 34'; Pereyra (yellow card) 86'	Report	Kolmanič 27'; Gallagher (yellow card) 88'; Obrian (yellow card) 89'	Stadium: Allianz Field; Attendance: 19,240; Referee: Joe Dickerson

May 28 16	Vancouver Whitecaps FC	0–0	Minnesota United FC	Vancouver, British Columbia
9:30 PM CT	Berhalter (yellow card) 73'	Report	Romero (yellow card) 76'; Markanich (yellow card) 90+1'	Stadium: BC Place; Attendance: 17,012; Referee: Allen Chapman

June 1 17	Seattle Sounders FC	2–3	Minnesota United FC	Seattle, Washington
5:00 PM CT	Kossa-Rienzi 55'; Romero 83' (o.g.); Musovski (yellow card) 90+1'	Report	Gressel (yellow card) 19'; Pereyra (yellow card) 40'; Oluwaseyi 51', 58'; Lod 54' (pen.) (yellow card) 90+6'; Markanich (yellow card) 69'	Stadium: Lumen Field; Attendance: 31,491; Referee: Lukasz Szpala

June 14 18	Minnesota United FC	2–4	San Diego FC	St. Paul, Minnesota
7:30 PM CT	McVey 8' (o.g.); Yeboah 38'	Report	Dreyer 11', 66' (pen.); Iloski 75', 90+2'	Stadium: Allianz Field; Attendance: 19,661; Referee: Rubiel Vazquez

June 25 19	Minnesota United FC	3–1	Houston Dynamo FC	St. Paul, Minnesota
7:30 PM CT	Boxall (yellow card) 45+7'; Díaz (yellow card) 52'; Hlongwane 61', 63'; Lod 70'; Yeboah (yellow card) 79'; Pereyra (yellow card) 82'	Report	Dorsey (yellow card) 36'; Andrade 90+4'	Stadium: Allianz Field; Attendance: 18,214; Referee: Sergii Demianchuk

June 28 20	New York Red Bulls	2–2	Minnesota United FC	Harrison, New Jersey
6:30 PM CT	Forsberg 11' (yellow card) 44'; Choupo-Moting 90'	Report	Yeboah 32'; Markanich 45'; Smir (yellow card) 67'; Romero (yellow card) 85'	Stadium: Sports Illustrated Stadium; Attendance: 21,293; Referee: Ricardo Montero

July 4 21	FC Dallas	1–2	Minnesota United FC	Frisco, Texas
7:30 PM CT	Moore (yellow card) 47'; Farrington 73'	Report	Harvey 35'; Oluwaseyi (yellow card) 38'; Yeboah (yellow card) 45+2'; Markanich 58'	Stadium: Toyota Stadium; Attendance: 11,004; Referee: Jair Marrufo

July 12 22	Minnesota United FC	4–1	San Jose Earthquakes	St. Paul, Minnesota
7:30 PM CT	Oluwaseyi 3'; Yeboah 42'; Markanich 45+5'; Rosales 90+5'	Report	Harkes (yellow card) 9'; Rodrigues (yellow card) 38'; Roberts (yellow card) 64'; Munie (yellow card) 65'; Wilson 70'; Arango (yellow card) 84'	Stadium: Allianz Field; Attendance: 19,743; Referee: Ismir Pekmic

July 16 23	Minnesota United FC	0–1	Los Angeles FC	St. Paul, Minnesota
7:30 PM CT	Yeboah (yellow card) 6'; Lod (yellow card) 25'; Romero (yellow card) 42'; Oluwaseyi (yellow card) 78'	Report	Bouanga 42' (pen.); Tillman (yellow card) 46'; Hollingshead (yellow card) 55'; Segura (yellow card) 90+3'	Stadium: Allianz Field; Attendance: 19,774; Referee: Pierre-Luc Lauziere

July 19 24	Portland Timbers	1–1	Minnesota United FC	Portland, Oregon
9:30 PM CT	Lassiter (yellow card) 43'; Fernandez 90+2'	Report	Romero (yellow card) 39'; Harvey (yellow card) 45'; Pereyra (yellow card) 65'; Markanich 77'	Stadium: Providence Park; Attendance: 23,507; Referee: Ricardo Fierro

July 26 25	St. Louis City SC	1–2	Minnesota United FC	St. Louis, Missouri
7:30 PM CT	Löwen 36' (pen.); Wallem (yellow card) 47'; Durkin (red card) 73'	Report	Markanich (yellow card) 56'; Yeboah 75' (pen.), 90' (pen.)	Stadium: Energizer Park; Attendance: 22,423; Referee: Victor Rivas

August 10 26	Minnesota United FC	1–2	Colorado Rapids	St. Paul, Minnesota
5:00 PM CT	Markanich (yellow card) 58'; Trapp (yellow card) 70'; Oluwaseyi 73'	Report	Yapi 60', 70'	Stadium: Allianz Field; Attendance: 19,756; Referee: Greg Dopka

August 16 27	Minnesota United FC	1–0	Seattle Sounders FC	St. Paul, Minnesota
7:30 PM CT	Romero (yellow card) 24'; Pereyra 71' (yellow card) 81'	Report	Yeimar (yellow card) 57'	Stadium: Allianz Field; Attendance: 19,432; Referee: Malik Badawi

August 23 28	Real Salt Lake	1–3	Minnesota United FC	Sandy, Utah
8:30 PM CT	Olatunji 15'; Cruz (yellow card) 52'; Yedlin (yellow card) 75'	Report	Vera 6' (o.g.); Lod 36'; Pereyra 51'; Romero (yellow card) 58'; St. Clair (yellow card) 74'	Stadium: America First Field; Attendance: 20,137; Referee: Joe Dickerson

August 30 29	Minnesota United FC	1–1	Portland Timbers	St. Paul, Minnesota
7:30 PM CT	Rosales (yellow card) 33'; Gressel (yellow card) 78'; Lod 85'; Pereyra (yellow card) 90+3'	Report	Romero 79' (o.g.)	Stadium: Allianz Field; Attendance: 19,619; Referee: Jair Marrufo

September 13 30	San Diego FC	1–3	Minnesota United FC	San Diego, California
9:30 PM CT	Duah (yellow card) 54'; Tverskov 90+5'	Report	Lod (yellow card) 14'; Díaz (yellow card) 28'; Boxall (yellow card) 36'; Harvey (yellow card) 49' (goal) 77'; Markanich 74'; St. Clair (yellow card) 90'; Triantis 90+2'	Stadium: Snapdragon Stadium; Attendance: 27,158; Referee: Tori Penso

September 20 31	Minnesota United FC	0–3	Chicago Fire FC	St. Paul, Minnesota
7:30 PM CT	Trapp (yellow card) 40'; Duggan (yellow card) 60'; Romero (yellow card) 87'	Report	Waterman 26'; D'Avilla 41'; Zinckernagel 70'; Elliott (yellow card) 87'	Stadium: Allianz Field; Attendance: 19,693; Referee: Marcos de Oliveira

September 27 32	Colorado Rapids	1–1	Minnesota United FC	Commerce City, Colorado
8:30 PM CT	Aaronson (yellow card) 8'; Santos 45+1'; Holding (yellow card) 54'	Report	Triantis 65'	Stadium: Dick's Sporting Goods Park; Attendance: 16,503; Referee: Ismail Elfath

October 4 33	Minnesota United FC	3–0	Sporting Kansas City	St. Paul, Minnesota
7:30 PM CT	Markanich 25', 63'; Pereyra 59'	Report	Bassong (yellow card) 53'; Davis (yellow card) 90'	Stadium: Allianz Field; Attendance: 19,784; Referee: Natalie Simon

October 18 34	LA Galaxy	2–1	Minnesota United FC	Carson, California
8:00 PM CT	Nascimento 12'; Paintsil 52'; Cerrillo (yellow card) 67' (yellow-red card) 90+7'	Report	Triantis (yellow card) 61'; Romero (yellow card) 79'; Pereyra 90+5'	Stadium: Dignity Health Sports Park; Attendance: 17,765; Referee: Rosendo Mendoza

=== MLS Cup Playoffs ===
==== Round One ====
October 27 Round One	Minnesota United FC	0–0 (3–2 p)	Seattle Sounders FC	St. Paul, Minnesota
8:00 PM CT	St. Clair (yellow card) 10'; Hlongwane (yellow card) 30'; Boxall (yellow card) 65'; Triantis (yellow card) 83'; Pereyra (yellow card) 90+3'	Report		Stadium: Allianz Field; Attendance: 16,945; Referee: Alexis Da Silva
	Penalties
	Yeboah (penalty scored); Triantis (penalty scored); Pereyra (penalty scored); Gressel (penalty missed)		(penalty scored) Rusnák; (penalty missed) Roldán; (penalty scored) Ragen; (penalty missed) Roldan; (penalty missed) Leyva

November 3 Round One	Seattle Sounders FC	4–2	Minnesota United FC	Seattle, Washington
9:45 PM CT	Vargas 8', 86' (yellow card) 29'; Morris 21'; Musovski 41'	Report	Romero (yellow card) 25'; Triantis 45+1'; Lod 45+5'; Duggan (yellow card) 90+5'	Stadium: Lumen Field; Attendance: 30,085; Referee: Pierre-Luc Lauziere

November 8 Round One	Minnesota United FC	3–3 (7–6 p)	Seattle Sounders FC	St. Paul, Minnesota
3:00 PM CT	Pereyra 19' (yellow card) 26'; Rosales (red card) 41'; Boxall (yellow card) 45+6'; Díaz 62' (yellow card) 67'; Markanich 71'	Report	Rusnák 5'; Musovski 8'; Yeimar (yellow card) 18'; Morris 88'	Stadium: Allianz Field; Attendance: 18,645; Referee: Victor Rivas
	Penalties
	Pereyra (penalty missed); Triantis (penalty scored); Gene (penalty scored); Duggan (penalty scored); Boxall (penalty scored); Harvey (penalty scored); Markanich (penalty missed); Dotson (penalty missed); Hlongwane (penalty scored); St. Clair (penalty scored)		(penalty scored) Rusnák; (penalty missed) Morris; (penalty scored) Ragen; (penalty scored) Kent; (penalty scored) Rothrock; (penalty scored) Georgi; (penalty missed) Vargas; (penalty missed) De Rosario; (penalty scored) Roldán; (penalty missed) Thomas
Note: Minnesota United FC wins the series 2-1

==== Conference Semifinals ====
November 24 Conference Semifinals	San Diego FC	1–0	Minnesota United FC	San Diego, California
9:00 PM CT	Dreyer 72'; Pilcher (yellow card) 77'; Sisniega (yellow card) 90+4'; Ingvartsen (yellow card) 90+5'	Report	Triantis (yellow card) 15'; Yeboah (yellow card) 20'; Markanich (yellow card) 81'; Harvey (yellow card) 90+2'	Stadium: Snapdragon Stadium; Attendance: 32,502; Referee: Rosendo Mendoza

=== U.S. Open Cup ===
May 7 Round of 32	Louisville City FC (Kentucky)	0–1	Minnesota United FC	Louisville, Kentucky
6:30 PM CT	Adams (yellow card) 39'; Morris (yellow card) 73'; Lambert (yellow card) 84'; McFadden (yellow card) 90+5'	Report	Randell 65'; Fischer (yellow card) 90+4'	Stadium: Lynn Family Stadium; Attendance: 4,482; Referee: Muhammad Kaleia

May 21 Round of 16	Minnesota United FC	3–2	(Missouri) St. Louis City SC	Saint Paul, Minnesota
6:30 PM CT	Yeboah 10'; Harvey (yellow card) 26'; Markanich (yellow card) 42', (goal) 85', 88'	Report	Durkin (yellow card) 24'; Hartel 55'; Klauss 65'	Stadium: Allianz Field; Attendance: 3,325; Referee: Brandon Stevis

July 8 Quarterfinals	Minnesota United FC	3–1 (a.e.t.)	(Illinois) Chicago Fire FC	Saint Paul, Minnesota
7:00 PM CT	Trapp (yellow card) 27'; Harvey (yellow card) 35'; Lod 47'; Rosales (yellow card) 51'; Yeboah 95', 120' (pen.); Hlongwane (yellow card) 117'	Report	Gonzalez (red card) 25'; Gutiérrez 28' (pen.); Elliott (yellow card) 37'; Barroso (yellow card) 118'; Brady (yellow card) 120'	Stadium: Allianz Field; Attendance: 9,814; Referee: Ekaterina Koroleva

September 17 Semifinals	Minnesota United FC	1–2 (a.e.t.)	(Texas) Austin FC	Saint Paul, Minnesota
7:00 PM CT	Díaz (yellow card) 34'; Pereyra 67' (yellow card) 114'	Report	Bukari (yellow card) 24' (goal) 45+4'; Pereira (yellow card) 45+2'; Hines-Ike (yellow card) 60'; Fodrey 120' (yellow card) 120+1'	Stadium: Allianz Field; Attendance: 14,621; Referee: Alexis Da Silva

=== Leagues Cup ===
July 30 Phase One	Minnesota United FC (United States)	4–1	(Mexico) Querétaro	St. Paul, Minnesota
7:30 PM CT	Hlongwane 11'; Yeboah 20'; Markanich 79'; Oluwaseyi 90+1'	Report	Mendoza (yellow card) 18'; Escamilla (yellow card) 36'; Julio 67'; Zapata (yellow card) 75' (yellow-red card) 88'	Stadium: Allianz Field; Attendance: 14,469; Referee: David Gómez

August 2 Phase One	América (Mexico)	3–3 (8–7 p)	(United States) Minnesota United FC	Houston, Texas
8:00 PM CT	Boxall 27' (o.g.); Lichnovsky (yellow card) 49' (yellow-red card) 62'; Zúñiga 53'; Violante (yellow card) 89'; Cáceres 90'	Report	Oluwaseyi 17'; Hlongwane 31'; Harvey 65'	Stadium: Shell Energy Stadium; Attendance: 13,885; Referee: Drew Fischer
	Penalties
	Rodríguez (penalty scored); Zendejas (penalty scored); Cáceres (penalty scored); Reyes (penalty scored); Aguirre (penalty scored); Borja (penalty scored); Sánchez (penalty scored); Violante (penalty scored)		(penalty scored) Pereyra; (penalty scored) Yeboah; (penalty scored) Trapp; (penalty scored) Harvey; (penalty scored) Gressel; (penalty scored) Rosales; (penalty scored) Boxall; (penalty missed) Romero

August 6 Phase One	Minnesota United FC (United States)	0–2	(Mexico) Atlético San Luis	St. Paul, Minnesota
7:30 PM CT	Rosales (yellow card) 62'; Oluwaseyi (yellow card) 90+3'	Report	Pedro 45+1'; Galdames (yellow card) 52'; Klimowicz (yellow card) 54'; Torres (yellow card) 78'; Pérez Bouquet 89'	Stadium: Allianz Field; Attendance: 14,607; Referee: Oshane Nation

== Statistics ==
=== Appearances and goals ===
Last updated November 24th, 2025.

No.	Pos	Nat	Player	Total		Major League Soccer		U.S. Open Cup		Leagues Cup		MLS Cup Playoffs	
No.	Pos	Nat	Player	Apps	Goals	Apps	Goals	Apps	Goals	Apps	Goals	Apps	Goals
Goalkeepers
1	GK	(United States) USA	Alec Smir	2	0	1+1	0	0	0	0	0	0	0
96	GK	(Netherlands) NED	Wessel Speel	5	0	3	0	2	0	0	0	0	0
97	GK	(Canada) CAN	Dayne St. Clair	39	0	30	0	2	0	3	0	4	0
Defenders
2	DF	(United States) USA	Devin Padelford	5	0	1+3	0	1	0	0	0	0	0
5	DF	(Argentina) ARG	Nicolás Romero	35	0	25+2	0	2+1	0	2+1	0	2	0
12	DF	(United States) USA	Kipp Keller	0	0	0	0	0	0	0	0	0	0
13	DF	(United States) USA	Anthony Markanich	41	13	23+8	9	2+1	2	1+2	1	3+1	1
15	DF	(New Zealand) NZL	Michael Boxall	40	1	28+3	1	1+2	0	1+1	0	4	0
18	DF	(Slovakia) SVK	Matúš Kmeť	0	0	0	0	0	0	0	0	0	0
23	DF	(Germany) GER	Morris Duggan	31	0	14+7	0	3+1	0	3	0	2+1	0
27	DF	(United States) USA	DJ Taylor	11	0	1+6	0	1+1	0	1+1	0	0	0
28	DF	(Colombia) COL	Jefferson Díaz	35	1	24+3	0	2	0	3	0	3	1
33	DF	(United States) USA	Kieran Chandler	2	0	1	0	1	0	0	0	0	0
35	DF	(United States) USA	Britton Fischer	1	0	0	0	0+1	0	0	0	0	0
67	DF	(Panama) PAN	Carlos Harvey	33	2	16+9	2	2	0	1+2	0	1+2	0
Midfielders
7	MF	(Austria) AUT	Dominik Fitz	7	0	1+4	0	0+1	0	0	0	0+1	0
8	MF	(Honduras) HON	Joseph Rosales	33	1	15+10	1	1+1	0	1+2	0	3	0
16	MF	(Paraguay) PAR	Alexis Fariña	0	0	0	0	0	0	0	0	0	0
17	MF	(Finland) FIN	Robin Lod	43	7	28+5	5	1+2	1	3	0	4	1
20	MF	(United States) USA	Wil Trapp	42	2	32+2	2	2	0	1+1	0	4	0
22	MF	(South Korea) KOR	Jeong Ho-yeon	6	0	1+3	0	2	0	0	0	0	0
24	MF	(United States) USA	Julian Gressel	30	1	12+9	1	3+1	0	2+1	0	0+2	0
25	MF	(Greece) GRE	Nectarios Triantis	10	3	4+1	2	1	0	0	0	4	1
26	MF	(Argentina) ARG	Joaquín Pereyra	43	8	29+4	6	1+2	1	3	0	4	1
30	MF	(France) FRA	Owen Gene	30	0	5+17	0	2+1	0	2+1	0	0+2	0
31	MF	(United States) USA	Hassani Dotson	12	1	5+3	1	0	0	0	0	0+4	0
34	MF	(United States) USA	Curt Calov	1	0	0	0	1	0	0	0	0	0
37	MF	(Senegal) SEN	Babacar Niang	1	0	0	0	0+1	0	0	0	0	0
90	MF	(Togo) TOG	Loïc Mesanvi	3	0	0+2	0	0+1	0	0	0	0	0
Forwards
9	FW	(Italy) ITA	Kelvin Yeboah	40	13	23+7	9	2+1	3	2+1	1	2+2	0
19	FW	(England) ENG	Samuel Shashoua	6	0	0+5	0	1	0	0	0	0	0
21	FW	(South Africa) RSA	Bongokuhle Hlongwane	44	5	27+7	3	3	0	2+1	2	4	0
29	FW	(Senegal) SEN	Mamadou Dieng	4	0	1+3	0	0	0	0	0	0	0
39	FW	(United States) USA	Luke Hille	2	0	0+1	0	0+1	0	0	0	0	0
98	FW	(Liberia) LBR	Darius Randell	6	1	1+3	0	1+1	1	0	0	0	0
99	FW	(United States) USA	Jordan Adebayo-Smith	0	0	0	0	0	0	0	0	0	0
Player(s) transferred out but featured this season
7	FW	(South Korea) KOR	Jeong Sang-bin	18	0	2+13	0	3	0	0	0	0	0
14	FW	(Canada) CAN	Tani Oluwaseyi	29	12	21+3	10	1+1	0	1+2	2	0	0

=== Goalscorers ===
As of November 24th, 2025.

Rank	No.	Pos.	Nat.	Name	Major League Soccer	U.S. Open Cup	Leagues Cup	MLS Cup Playoffs	Total
1	9	FW	(Italy)	Kelvin Yeboah	9	3	1	0	13
1	13	DF	(United States)	Anthony Markanich	9	2	1	1	13
3	14	FW	(Canada)	Tani Oluwaseyi	10	0	2	0	12
4	26	MF	(Argentina)	Joaquín Pereyra	6	1	0	1	8
5	17	MF	(Finland)	Robin Lod	5	1	0	1	7
6	21	FW	(South Africa)	Bongokuhle Hlongwane	3	0	2	0	5
7	67	DF	(Panama)	Carlos Harvey	2	0	1	0	3
7	25	MF	(Greece)	Nectarios Triantis	2	0	0	1	3
9	20	MF	(United States)	Wil Trapp	2	0	0	0	2
10	31	MF	(United States)	Hassani Dotson	1	0	0	0	1
10	24	MF	(United States)	Julian Gressel	1	0	0	0	1
10	15	DF	(New Zealand)	Michael Boxall	1	0	0	0	1
10	8	MF	(Honduras)	Joseph Rosales	1	0	0	0	1
10	98	FW	(Liberia)	Darius Randell	0	1	0	0	1
10	28	DF	(Colombia)	Jefferson Díaz	0	0	0	1	1
Own Goals					4	0	0	0	4
Total					56	8	7	5	76

=== Assists ===
As of November 24th, 2025.

Rank	No.	Pos.	Nat.	Name	Major League Soccer	U.S. Open Cup	Leagues Cup	MLS Cup Playoffs	Total
1	26	MF	(Argentina)	Joaquín Pereyra	11	2	3	2	18
2	14	FW	(Canada)	Tani Oluwaseyi	8	0	0	0	8
3	5	DF	(Argentina)	Nicolás Romero	6	0	0	0	6
3	17	MF	(Finland)	Robin Lod	5	0	0	1	6
3	15	DF	(New Zealand)	Michael Boxall	5	0	0	1	6
6	24	MF	(United States)	Julian Gressel	3	1	1	0	5
7	28	DF	(Colombia)	Jefferson Díaz	4	0	0	0	4
7	20	MF	(United States)	Wil Trapp	4	0	0	0	4
9	9	FW	(Italy)	Kelvin Yeboah	3	0	0	0	3
9	8	MF	(Honduras)	Joseph Rosales	2	0	1	0	3
9	21	FW	(South Africa)	Bongokuhle Hlongwane	2	0	0	1	3
12	25	MF	(Greece)	Nectarios Triantis	2	0	0	0	2
12	67	DF	(Panama)	Carlos Harvey	1	1	0	0	2
12	13	DF	(United States)	Anthony Markanich	1	1	0	0	2
12	23	DF	(Germany)	Morris Duggan	1	0	0	1	2
16	7	FW	(South Korea)	Jeong Sang-bin	0	1	0	0	1

=== Disciplinary record ===
As of November 24th, 2025.

Rk.	No.	Pos.	Nat.	Name	Major League Soccer			U.S. Open Cup			Leagues Cup			MLS Cup Playoffs			Total		
Rk.	No.	Pos.	Nat.	Name	Yellow card	Second yellow card	Red card	Yellow card	Second yellow card	Red card	Yellow card	Second yellow card	Red card	Yellow card	Second yellow card	Red card	Yellow card	Second yellow card	Red card
1	8	MF	(Honduras)	Joseph Rosales	2	0	0	1	0	0	1	0	0	0	0	1	4	0	1
2	5	DF	(Argentina)	Nicolás Romero	10	0	0	0	0	0	0	0	0	1	0	0	11	0	0
2	26	MF	(Argentina)	Joaquín Pereyra	8	0	0	1	0	0	0	0	0	2	0	0	11	0	0
4	13	DF	(United States)	Anthony Markanich	5	0	0	1	0	0	0	0	0	1	0	0	7	0	0
4	15	DF	(New Zealand)	Michael Boxall	5	0	0	0	0	0	0	0	0	2	0	0	7	0	0
6	14	FW	(Canada)	Tani Oluwaseyi	5	0	0	0	0	0	1	0	0	0	0	0	6	0	0
6	97	GK	(Canada)	Dayne St. Clair	4	0	0	0	0	0	0	0	0	2	0	0	6	0	0
8	28	DF	(Colombia)	Jefferson Díaz	3	0	0	1	0	0	0	0	0	1	0	0	5	0	0
8	67	DF	(Panama)	Carlos Harvey	2	0	0	2	0	0	0	0	0	1	0	0	5	0	0
10	17	MF	(Finland)	Robin Lod	4	0	0	0	0	0	0	0	0	0	0	0	4	0	0
10	20	MF	(United States)	Wil Trapp	3	0	0	1	0	0	0	0	0	0	0	0	4	0	0
10	9	FW	(Italy)	Kelvin Yeboah	3	0	0	0	0	0	0	0	0	1	0	0	4	0	0
13	21	FW	(South Africa)	Bongokuhle Hlongwane	1	0	0	1	0	0	0	0	0	1	0	0	3	0	0
13	25	MF	(Greece)	Nectarios Triantis	1	0	0	0	0	0	0	0	0	2	0	0	3	0	0
15	31	MF	(United States)	Hassani Dotson	2	0	0	0	0	0	0	0	0	0	0	0	2	0	0
15	24	MF	(United States)	Julian Gressel	2	0	0	0	0	0	0	0	0	0	0	0	2	0	0
15	23	DF	(Germany)	Morris Duggan	1	0	0	0	0	0	0	0	0	1	0	0	2	0	0
18	7	FW	(South Korea)	Jeong Sang-bin	1	0	0	0	0	0	0	0	0	0	0	0	1	0	0
18	1	GK	(United States)	Alec Smir	1	0	0	0	0	0	0	0	0	0	0	0	1	0	0
18	35	DF	(United States)	Britton Fischer	0	0	0	1	0	0	0	0	0	0	0	0	1	0	0
Totals					63	0	0	9	0	0	2	0	0	15	0	1	89	0	1

=== Clean sheets ===
As of November 24th, 2025.

Rank	No.	Pos.	Nat.	Name	Major League Soccer	U.S. Open Cup	Leagues Cup	MLS Cup Playoffs	Total
1	97	GK	(Canada)	Dayne St. Clair	10	0	0	1	11
2	96	GK	(Netherlands)	Wessel Speel	0	1	0	0	1

== Honors and awards ==
=== Bell Bank Man of the Match ===
Note: Bell Bank Man of the Match is voted on by fans on the MNUFC app near the end of each MLS Match.

Player	Position	Times Won	Most Recent
(Argentina) Joaquín Pereyra	MF	7	Nov. 24th at San Diego FC
(Italy) Kelvin Yeboah	FW	6	Jul. 26th at St. Louis City
(New Zealand) Michael Boxall	DF	5	Jul. 16th vs Los Angeles FC
(United States) Anthony Markanich	DF	4	Nov. 8th vs Seattle Sounders FC
(Australia) Nectarios Triantis	MF	3	Nov. 4th at Seattle Sounders FC
(Finland) Robin Lod	MF	2	Oct. 18th at LA Galaxy
(Canada) Dayne St. Clair	GK	2	Sept. 13th at San Diego FC
(South Africa) Bongokuhle Hlongwane	FW	2	June 25th vs Houston Dynamo FC
(Canada) Tani Oluwaseyi	FW	2	Mar. 29th vs Real Salt Lake
(United States) Julian Gressel	MF	1	May 14th at Houston Dynamo FC
(Germany) Morris Duggan	DF	1	Mar. 8th at San Jose Earthquakes

Note: Bell Bank Man of the Match was not awarded after the games against Chicago Fire FC on September 20.

=== MLS Team of the Matchday ===
Week	Player	Opponent	Position	Ref
2	(New Zealand) Michael Boxall	CF Montréal	DF	
2	(Italy) Kelvin Yeboah	CF Montréal	Bench	
3	(New Zealand) Michael Boxall	San Jose Earthquakes	DF	
4	(Canada) Tani Oluwaseyi	Sporting Kansas City	FW	
5	(Italy) Kelvin Yeboah	LA Galaxy	FW	
6	(Canada) Tani Oluwaseyi	Real Salt Lake	FW	
6	(Colombia) Jefferson Díaz	Real Salt Lake	DF	
7	(United States) Wil Trapp	New York City FC	MF	
7	(Argentina) Joaquín Pereyra	New York City FC	Bench	
11	(Argentina) Joaquín Pereyra	Austin FC	MF	
12	(Wales) Eric Ramsay	Inter Miami CF	Coach	
12	(Finland) Robin Lod	Inter Miami CF	Bench	
14	(Argentina) Joaquín Pereyra	St. Louis City SC	MF	
14	(Canada) Tani Oluwaseyi	St. Louis City SC	Bench	
15	(New Zealand) Michael Boxall	Austin FC	Bench	
17	(Canada) Tani Oluwaseyi	Seattle Sounders FC	FW	
17	(Finland) Robin Lod	Seattle Sounders FC	Bench	
20	(South Africa) Bongokuhle Hlongwane	Houston Dynamo FC	MF	
20	(New Zealand) Michael Boxall	Houston Dynamo FC	DF	
20	(United States) Anthony Markanich	Houston Dynamo FC	Bench	
22	(Panama) Carlos Harvey	FC Dallas	DF	
22	(United States) Anthony Markanich	FC Dallas	Bench	
24	(Canada) Tani Oluwaseyi	San Jose Earthquakes	FW	
24	(Italy) Kelvin Yeboah	San Jose Earthquakes	Bench	
27	(Italy) Kelvin Yeboah	St. Louis City SC	FW	
30	(Finland) Robin Lod	Real Salt Lake	MF	
31	(Finland) Robin Lod	Portland Timbers	Bench	
33	(Greece) Nectarios Triantis	San Diego FC	MF	
33	(Canada) Dayne St. Clair	San Diego FC	GK	
37	(Greece) Nectarios Triantis	Colorado Rapids	MF	
38	(United States) Anthony Markanich	Sporting Kansas City	DF	
38	(Argentina) Joaquín Pereyra	Sporting Kansas City	Bench	

=== MLS Honors ===
Player	Pos	Honor	Ref
(Canada) Tani Oluwaseyi	FW	Player of the Matchday, Week 4 vs. Sporting Kansas City	
(New Zealand) Michael Boxall	DF	MLS All-Star	
(Canada) Dayne St. Clair	GK	MLS All-Star	
(Canada) Dayne St. Clair	GK	Goalkeeper of the Year	
(Canada) Dayne St. Clair	GK	Best XI	
