= Albornoz =

Albornoz is a Spanish surname. Notable people with the surname include:

- Gil Álvarez Carrillo de Albornoz (c. 1295–1367), Spanish cardinal and archbishop
- Rodrigo de Albornoz (fl. 1520s), Spanish colonial official in Mexico
- Gil Carrillo de Albornoz (1579–1649) (1579–1649), Spanish cardinal
- José Carrillo de Albornoz, 1st Duke of Montemar (1671–1747), Spanish nobleman
- Álvaro de Albornoz (1879–1954), Spanish writer and politician
- Claudio Sánchez-Albornoz y Menduiña (1893–1984), Spanish medieval historian
- Humberto Albornoz (1894–1959), Ecuadorian politician
- Severo Ochoa de Albornoz (1905–1993), Spanish-American physician
- Aurora de Albornoz (1926–1990), Spanish poet
- José Albornoz (born 1970), Argentine footballer
- Oscar Javier Morales Albornoz (born 1975), Uruguayan footballer
- Juan José Albornoz (born 1982), Chilean footballer
- Mauricio Albornoz (born 1988), Swedish footballer
- Miiko Albornoz (born 1990), Chilean footballer
- Tomás Albornoz (born 1997), Argentine rugby union player
- Camilo Albornoz (born 2000), Argentine footballer
- Daniel Albornoz, Colombian-Canadian drag queen
