= Rida Zouhir =

Canadian soccer player (born 2003)

Personal information
- Full name: Rida Zouhir-Takedam
- Date of birth: November 23, 2003 (age 22)
- Place of birth: Montreal, Quebec, Canada
- Height: 6 ft 0 in (1.83 m)
- Position: Midfielder

Team information
- Current team: Loudoun United
- Number: 28

Youth career
- CS Braves D’Ahuntsic
- 2016–2020: Montreal Impact

Senior career*
Years	Team	Apps	(Gls)
2021–2024	CF Montréal (Note: Montreal Impact changed its name to CF Montréal in 2021)	19	(0)
2022	→ CF Montréal U23 (loan)	2	(2)
2023	→ San Antonio FC (loan)	25	(8)
2024	→ CF Montréal U23 (loan)	4	(0)
2024	→ Birmingham Legion (loan)	10	(2)
2025	D.C. United	15	(0)
2026	Egaleo	2	(0)
2026–	Loudoun United	8	(1)

International career^{‡}
2022	Morocco U20	1	(0)
2022	Canada U20	4	(0)
- * Club domestic league appearances and goals as of October 31, 2026 ‡ National team caps and goals as of 22:13, 3 March 2023 (UTC)

Rida Zouhir-Takedam (born November 23, 2003) is a Canadian professional soccer player who plays as a midfielder for USL Championship club Loudoun United FC.

== Early life ==
Zouhir began playing youth soccer with CS Braves D’Ahuntsic when he was five, quickly being moved up to playing with the eight-year olds. In 2016, he joined the Montreal Impact Academy.

== Club career ==
=== CF Montréal ===
On December 4, 2020, Zouhir signed his first homegrown contract with Montreal Impact, later renamed CF Montréal to begin in the 2021 season. Zouhir made his professional debut with Montreal in a 2–1 loss against DC United on August 8, 2021. He made his first start on October 27, 2021 in a Canadian Championship semi-final match against Forge FC and made his first MLS start on March 12, 2022 against New York City FC. In April 2023, he extended his contract through 2024, with a club option for 2025, and was sent on loan to San Antonio FC of the USL Championship. He scored his first professional goal with San Antonio FC on May 27, 2023 against New Mexico United. During the 2024 season, he was sent to play with the U23 team, before being loaned to the Birmingham Legion in the USL Championship in August. At the end of the season, Zouhir's contract option would not be exercised, ending his time with the club.

=== D.C. United ===
In February 2025, Zouhir would sign a contract for the 2025 season with D.C. United, with club options for the 2026 and 2027 seasons. At the end of the 2025 season, his club option would be declined, making him a free agent.

=== Egaleo ===
In February 2026, Zouhir signed with Super League Greece 2 club Egaleo.

=== Loudoun United FC ===
In September 2026, Zouhir signed with Loudoun United FC of the USL Championship signed through the 2027 season.

== International career ==
Born in Canada, Zouhir is of Moroccan descent and eligible to play for both nations.

On March 23, 2022, Zouhir was named to the Moroccan U-20 team. He appeared for the U20s against the Romania U20s in a 2–2 friendly tie on March 29, 2022.

In June 2022, Zouhir was officially called up by the Canadian U-20 team for the 2022 CONCACAF U-20 Championship, where he appeared in all three group stage matches, as well as the team's Round of 16 match.

== Career statistics ==
As of September 27, 2025

Appearances and goals by club, season and competition
Club	Season	League			Playoffs		Domestic Cup		Continental		Total	
Club	Season	Division	Apps	Goals	Apps	Goals	Apps	Goals	Apps	Goals	Apps	Goals
CF Montréal	2021	MLS	2	0	0	0	2	0	—		4	0
CF Montréal	2022	MLS	5	0	0	0	1	0	2	0	8	0
CF Montréal	2023	MLS	5	0	0	0	1	0	—		6	0
CF Montréal	2024	MLS	7	0	0	0	2	0	—		9	0
CF Montréal	Total		19	0	0	0	6	0	2	0	27	0
CF Montréal U23 (loan)	2022	PLSQ	2	2	—		—		—		2	2
San Antonio FC (loan)	2023	USL Championship	25	8	0	0	0	0	—		25	8
CF Montréal U23 (loan)	2024	Ligue1 Québec	4	0	—		—		—		4	0
Birmingham Legion FC (loan)	2024	USL Championship	10	2	0	0	0	0	—		10	2
D.C. United	2025	MLS	15	0	0	0	1	0	—		16	0
Career total			71	12	0	0	7	0	2	0	80	12
