= Tani Oluwaseyi =

Canadian soccer player (born 2000)

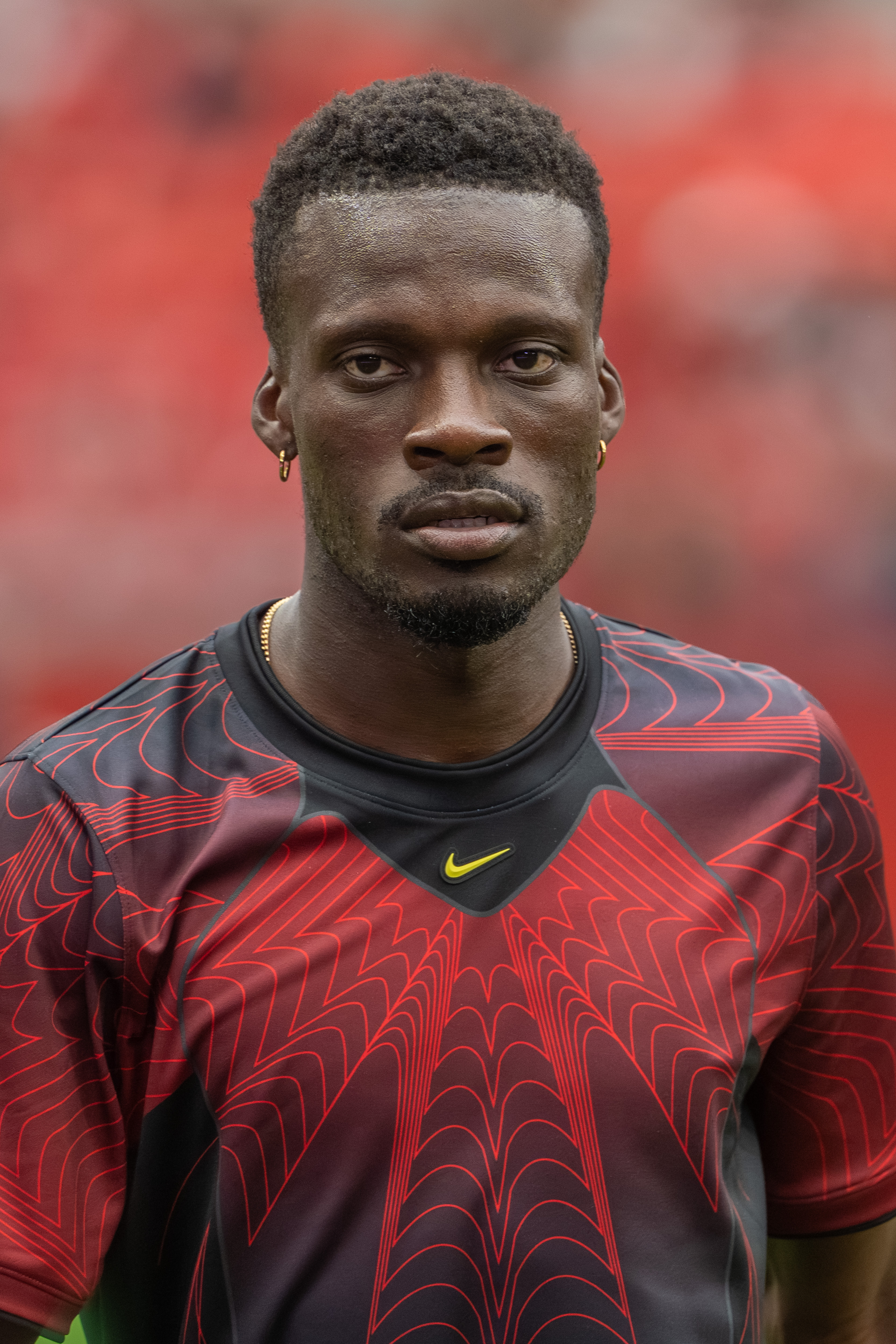
- Oluwaseyi with Canada in 2026

Personal information
- Full name: Tanitoluwa Oluwatimilehin Oluwaseyi
- Date of birth: May 15, 2000 (age 26)
- Place of birth: Abuja, Nigeria
- Height: 1.88 m (6 ft 2 in)
- Position: Striker

Team information
- Current team: Villarreal
- Number: 21

Youth career
- 2010–2014: Erin Mills SC
- 2014–2018: GPS Academy

College career
| Years | Team | Apps | (Gls) |
| 2018–2021 | St. John's Red Storm | 49 | (20) |

Senior career*
| Years | Team | Apps | (Gls) |
| 2021 | Manhattan SC | 2 | (1) |
| 2021 | NY Pancyprian-Freedoms | | |
| 2022–2025 | Minnesota United | 51 | (18) |
| 2022–2023 | → Minnesota United 2 (loan) | 13 | (3) |
| 2023 | → San Antonio FC (loan) | 25 | (17) |
| 2025– | Villarreal | 34 | (2) |

International career^{‡}
| 2024– | Canada | 33 | (5) |
- * Club domestic league appearances and goals as of November 8, 2026 ‡ National team caps and goals as of November 16, 2026

Tanitoluwa Oluwatimilehin Oluwaseyi (born May 15, 2000) is a professional soccer player who plays as a striker for La Liga club Villarreal. Born in Nigeria, he represents the Canada national team.

== Early life ==
Oluwaseyi was born in Abuja, Nigeria, but moved to Mississauga, Canada at age 10. He played youth soccer with Erin Mills SC and GPS Academy.

Oluwaseyi attended St. Joan of Arc Catholic Secondary School. There, he captained the Angels to a 17–0 record and a Provincial High School Championship as a senior he scored 30 goals and tallied ten assists while serving as a team captain. He was also a three-time MVP of the boys soccer team, scoring a total of 68 times over a four-year career. While at high school, Oluwaseyi also played club soccer for the GPS Academy, where he won the Golden Boot Award at the 2017 SuperCupNI, at which his team won the Vase Cup. He also led his team to Ontario Academy Soccer League and Provincial Indoor Soccer League Championships.

== College career ==
In 2018, Oluwaseyi committed to playing college soccer at St. John's University. In a four year college career, Oluwaseyi went on to make 49 appearances, scoring 20 goals and tallying ten assists. He missed nearly all his entire senior season, and his sophomore season was truncated by the COVID-19 pandemic. However, he earned numerous college accolades, including BIG EAST All-Freshman Team selection in 2018, BIG EAST Offensive Player of the Year, First Team All-BIG EAST, and United Soccer Coaches First Team All-Atlantic Region in 2019, and First Team All-BIG EAST, and United Soccer Coaches All-East Region Second Team in the 2020–21 season.

== Club career ==
=== Semi-professional ===
In 2021, Oluwaseyi appeared for local side Manhattan SC in the USL League Two, where he scored a single goal during his two appearances. He also played with New York Pancyprian-Freedoms, who compete in the fourth-tier EPSL. He was also named on the roster for NPSL side FC Golden State, but didn't make an appearance.

=== Minnesota United ===
In January 2022, it was announced Oluwaseyi would be available in the 2022 MLS SuperDraft. On January 11, he was selected 17th overall by Minnesota United. On February 25, Oluwaseyi signed a one-year deal with Minnesota. During the 2022 season, he spent time with Minnesota United 2 in MLS Next Pro. In November 2022 Minnesota announced they had exercised Oluwaseyi's contract option, keeping him at the club through 2023.

In April 2023, he was loaned to USL Championship side San Antonio FC for the remainder of the 2023 season. In his debut for San Antonio on May 7, Oluwaseyi scored the game-winning goal in a 2–1 victory over the Las Vegas Lights. On May 14, he scored a hat-trick against the Charleston Battery in a 7–0 victory. On July 7, Oluwaseyi got his second hat-trick against Memphis 901 in a 4–0 victory. Three weeks later on July 29, he would score four goals against Hartford Athletic in a 5–2 win, reaching 13 goals on the season and breaking San Antonio's single season scoring record.

On March 2, 2024, Oluwaseyi scored his first MLS goal, a stoppage-time equalizer as Minnesota United drew the Columbus Crew 1–1. After scoring 8 goals and 6 assists in the 2024 season, Oluwaseyi would be signed to a contract extension through the 2027 season, with a club option for 2028.

=== Villarreal ===
On August 29, 2025, Spanish side Villarreal announced they had acquired Oluwaseyi from Minnesota, with the forward signing a deal until 2030. He made his debut for the club on August 31, coming on as a substitute against Celta in an eventual 1–1 draw. He scored his first La Liga goal for Villarreal on September 23, 2025, against Sevilla, three days after earning his first assist for the club.

== International career ==
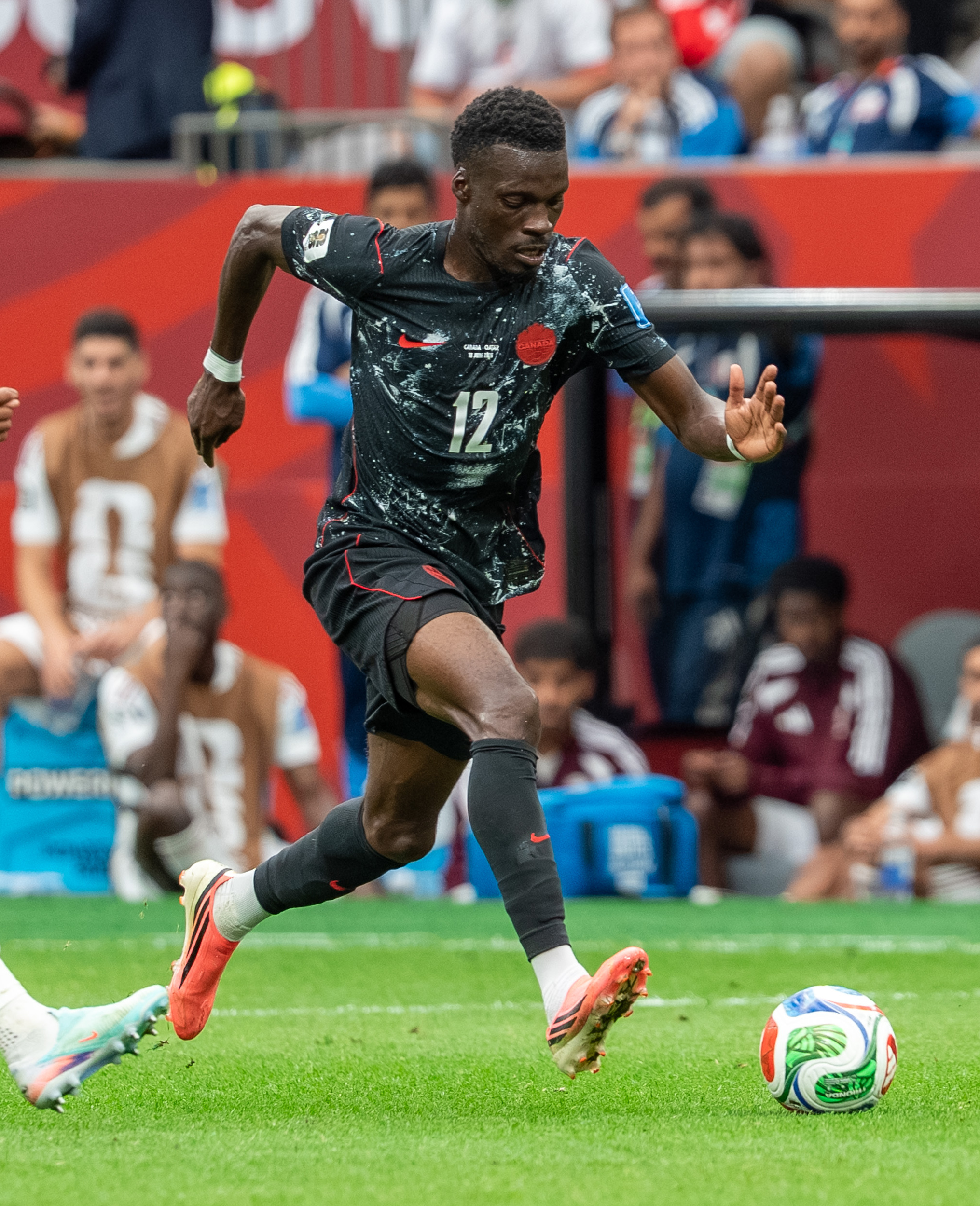
Oluwaseyi with Canada at the 2026 FIFA World Cup

Oluwaseyi was born in Nigeria, but having lived in Canada from age 10, Oluwaseyi was eligible to represent both the Nigerian national team and the Canadian national team.

In June 2024, he was announced as a late addition to the Canada squad ahead of two friendlies against the Netherlands and France. He made his debut against the latter on June 9 at the Matmut Atlantique. He substituted Ismaël Koné in the 84th minute as the game ended in a goalless draw. On June 15, 2024, Oluwaseyi was named to Canada's squad for the 2024 Copa América. He became cap-tied to Canada in a 1–0 win against Peru on June 25, 2024, substituting for Cyle Larin in the 82nd minute. On March 23, 2025, Oluwaseyi scored his debut goal, the first in a 2–1 win against the United States in the 2025 CONCACAF Nations League Finals third place match.

In May 2026, Oluwaseyi was selected for Canada's squad for the 2026 FIFA World Cup.

== Career statistics ==
=== Club ===
As of match played November 8, 2026

Appearances and goals by club, season and competition
| Club | Season | League | | | National cup (Note: Includes U.S. Open Cup, Copa del Rey) | | Continental | | Other | | Total | |
| Club | Season | Division | Apps | Goals | Apps | Goals | Apps | Goals | Apps | Goals | Apps | Goals |
|---|---|---|---|---|---|---|---|---|---|---|---|---|
| Manhattan SC | 2021 | USL League Two | 2 | 1 | — | | — | | — | | 2 | 1 |
| Minnesota United 2 | 2022 | MLS Next Pro | 10 | 2 | — | | — | | — | | 10 | 2 |
| Minnesota United 2 | 2023 | MLS Next Pro | 3 | 1 | — | | — | | — | | 3 | 1 |
| Minnesota United 2 | Total | | 13 | 3 | — | | — | | — | | 13 | 3 |
| Minnesota United | 2023 | MLS | 2 | 0 | 1 | 0 | — | | 0 | 0 | 3 | 0 |
| Minnesota United | 2024 | MLS | 25 | 8 | 0 | 0 | — | | 5 (Note: Two appearances in Leagues Cup, three appearances in MLS Cup playoffs) | 0 | 30 | 8 |
| Minnesota United | 2025 | MLS | 24 | 10 | 2 | 0 | — | | 3 (Note: Appearances in Leagues Cup) | 2 | 29 | 12 |
| Minnesota United | Total | | 51 | 18 | 3 | 0 | — | | 8 | 2 | 62 | 20 |
| San Antonio (loan) | 2023 | USL Championship | 25 | 17 | 0 | 0 | — | | 2 (Note: Appearances in USL Championship playoffs) | 1 | 27 | 18 |
| Villarreal | 2025–26 | La Liga | 27 | 2 | 3 | 3 | 7 (Note: Appearances in UEFA Champions League) | 2 | — | | 37 | 7 |
| Villarreal | 2026–27 | La Liga | 7 | 0 | 1 | 1 | 4 | 2 | — | | 12 | 3 |
| Villarreal | Total | | 34 | 2 | 4 | 4 | 11 | 4 | — | | 49 | 10 |
| Career total | | | 125 | 44 | 7 | 4 | 11 | 4 | 10 | 3 | 153 | 55 |

=== International ===
As of match played November 16, 2026

Appearances and goals by national team and year
| National team | Year | Apps | Goals |
|---|---|---|---|
| Canada | 2024 | 9 | 0 |
| Canada | 2025 | 12 | 2 |
| Canada | 2026 | 12 | 3 |
| Total | | 33 | 5 |

Scores and results list Canada's goal tally first.

List of international goals scored by Tani Oluwaseyi
| No. | Date | Venue | Cap | Opponent | Score | Result | Competition |
|---|---|---|---|---|---|---|---|
| 1 | March 23, 2025 | SoFi Stadium, Inglewood, United States | 11 | United States | 1–0 | 2–1 | 2025 CONCACAF Nations League Finals |
| 2 | June 17, 2025 | BC Place, Vancouver, Canada | 13 | Honduras | 2–0 | 6–0 | 2025 CONCACAF Gold Cup |
| 3 | November 13, 2026 | Manuel Felipe Carrera Stadium, Guatemala City, Guatemala | 32 | Guatemala | 1–0 | 3–2 | 2026–27 CONCACAF Nations League A |
| 4 | November 16, 2026 | BMO Field, Toronto, Canada | 33 | Guatemala | 2–1 | 4–1 | 2026–27 CONCACAF Nations League A |
| 5 | November 16, 2026 | BMO Field, Toronto, Canada | 33 | Guatemala | 4–1 | 4–1 | 2026–27 CONCACAF Nations League A |
