= 2023 San Antonio FC season =

San Antonio FC
2023 season
- Owner: Spurs Sports & Entertainment
- Head coach: Alen Marcina
- Stadium: Toyota Field
- USLC: Western Conference: 4th Overall: 7th
- USLC Playoffs: Conference semifinals
- U.S. Open Cup: Third round
- Top goalscorer: League: Tani Oluwaseyi (18 goals); All: Tani Oluwaseyi (18 goals)
- Highest home attendance: 8,328 vs Sunderland A.F.C. (July 15, 2023)
- Lowest home attendance: 3,204 vs Club de Lyon (April 4, 2023)
- Average home league attendance: League: 7,190; Playoffs: 7,304
- Biggest win: 0–7 (May 13 at Charleston Battery)
- Biggest defeat: 3–1 (June 24 at Sacramento Republic FC); 3–1 (October 27 at Sacramento Republic FC)
Home colors	Away colors	Champions Kit colors

The 2023 San Antonio FC season was the club's eighth season of existence. Including the San Antonio Thunder of the original NASL and the former San Antonio Scorpions of the modern NASL, it was the 14th season of professional soccer in San Antonio. The club played in the USL Championship, the second division of the United States soccer league system, and participated in the U.S. Open Cup. San Antonio were the reigning USL Champions. They came off their most successful season in club history in which they captured five trophies; the Copa Tejas, Copa Tejas shield, USLC regular season title, the Western Conference championship, and the USL Championship by beating Louisville City FC 3-1 in the 2022 USL Championship Final.

== Club ==
=== Coaching staff ===
Position	Staff
Head coach	(Canada) Alen Marcina
Assistant coach	(United States) Victor Lonchuk
Assistant coach	(Croatia) Dario Pot
SAFC Pro Academy Director & Director of Goalkeeping	(Mexico) Juan Lamadrid
Equipment Manager	(United States) Rashad Moore
Head athletic trainer	(United States) Jesse Lowrance
Assistant Athletic Trainer	(United States) Alex Saldana

Source: San Antonio FC

=== Other information ===
Owner	(United States) Spurs Sports & Entertainment
Chairman	(United States) Peter J. Holt
Managing Director	Vacant
Ground (capacity and dimensions)	Toyota Field (8,200 / 110x70 yards)
Training Ground	S.T.A.R. Soccer Complex

Source: San Antonio FC

== Squad information ==
=== First team squad ===
As of September 14, 2023.

Squad No.	Name	Nationality	Position(s)	Date of Birth (Age)
Goalkeepers
1	Jordan Farr	(United States)	GK	October 5, 1994 (age 31)
21	Nick Marsman	(Netherlands)	GK	October 1, 1990 (age 35)
50	Jude Bosshardt	(United States)	GK	April 19, 2005 (age 21)
99	Carlos Mercado	(United States)	GK	September 27, 1999 (age 26)
Defenders
2	Carter Manley	(United States)	DF	April 29, 1996 (age 30)
3	Mitchell Taintor	(United States)	DF	September 11, 1994 (age 31)
4	Fabien Garcia	(France)	DF	July 14, 1994 (age 31)
15	Lamar Batista	(United States)	DF	March 7, 1998 (age 28)
22	Shannon Gomez	(Trinidad and Tobago)	DF	October 5, 1996 (age 29)
23	Tulu	(Togo)	DF	April 9, 1997 (age 29)
24	Isaiah Parker	(United States)	DF	September 1, 2002 (age 23)
30	Ismaila Jome	(The Gambia)	DF	November 4, 1994 (age 31)
31	Connor Maloney	(United States)	DF	May 18, 1995 (age 30)
33	Trova Boni	(Burkina Faso)	DF	December 21, 1999 (age 26)
46	Kibukila Mbula	(United States)	DF	April 24, 2006 (age 20)
48	Giovanni Padilla	(United States)	DF	March 23, 2006 (age 20)
Midfielders
5	Jacori Hayes	(United States)	MF	June 29, 1995 (age 30)
6	PC	(Brazil)	MF	March 10, 1996 (age 30)
7	Juan Carlos Azócar	(Venezuela)	MF	October 1, 1995 (age 30)
8	Jorge Hernández	(Mexico)	MF	November 8, 2000 (age 25)
9	Niko Hansen	(Denmark)	MF	September 14, 1994 (age 31)
10	David Loera	(United States)	MF	September 10, 1998 (age 27)
18	Rida Zouhir	(Canada)	MF	November 23, 2003 (age 22)
25	Mohammed Abu	(Ghana)	MF	November 14, 1991 (age 34)
44	Dalziel Ozuna	(United States)	MF	March 5, 2007 (age 19)
51	Henrik Sakshaug	(United States)	MF	January 19, 2005 (age 21)
Forwards
11	Justin Dhillon	(United States)	FW	June 6, 1995 (age 30)
16	Tani Oluwaseyi	(Nigeria)	FW	May 15, 2000 (age 26)
17	Nathan Fogaça	(Brazil)	FW	June 9, 1999 (age 26)
19	Santiago Patiño	(Colombia)	FW	March 10, 1997 (age 29)
20	Ignacio Bailone	(Argentina)	FW	January 20, 1994 (age 32)
45	Mateo Gonzales	(United States)	DF	
49	Eduardo Fernandez	(United States)	FW	April 25, 2006 (age 20)

== Player movement ==
=== In ===
Pos	Player	Previous club	Fee	Date	Source
DF	(United States) Connor Maloney	Multi-year extension	Undisclosed	November 24, 2022	
FW	(United States) Justin Dhillon	Multi-year extension	Undisclosed	November 29, 2022	
MF	(United States) David Loera	Signed extension	Undisclosed	December 2, 2022	
FW	(Argentina) Ignacio Bailone	Option exercised	Undisclosed	December 5, 2022	
DF	(France) Fabien Garcia	Option exercised	Undisclosed	December 5, 2022	
DF	(Trinidad and Tobago) Shannon Gomez	Option exercised	Undisclosed	December 5, 2022	
DF	(United States) Carter Manley	Option exercised	Undisclosed	December 5, 2022	
GK	(United States) Jordan Farr	Multi-year extension	Undisclosed	December 9, 2022	
MF	(Denmark) Niko Hansen	(United States) Minnesota United FC	Undisclosed	January 11, 2023	
FW	(England) Kimarni Smith	(United States) D.C. United	Undisclosed	January 12, 2023	
MF	(Argentina) Cristian Parano	(Portugal) Paços de Ferreira	Undisclosed	February 2, 2023	
GK	(United States) Carlos Mercado	(United States) San Antonio FC	Undisclosed	February 14, 2023	
MF	(United States) Jacori Hayes	(United States) Minnesota United FC	Undisclosed	March 7, 2023	
DF	(United States) Lamar Batista	(United States) Rochester New York FC	25-day contract	March 9, 2023	
GK	(United States) Jude Bosshardt	(United States) SAFC Pro Academy	Undisclosed	March 10, 2023	
FW	(United States) Eduardo Fernandez	(United States) SAFC Pro Academy	Undisclosed	March 10, 2023	
DF	(United States) Mateo Gonzales	(United States) SAFC Pro Academy	Undisclosed	March 10, 2023	
DF	(United States) Roman Holt	(United States) SAFC Pro Academy	Undisclosed	March 10, 2023	
DF	(United States) Kibukila Mbula	(United States) SAFC Pro Academy	Undisclosed	March 10, 2023	
MF	(United States) Dalziel Ozuna	(United States) SAFC Pro Academy	Undisclosed	March 10, 2023	
DF	(United States) Giovanni Padilla	(United States) SAFC Pro Academy	Undisclosed	March 10, 2023	
MF	(United States) Henrik Sakshaug	(United States) SAFC Pro Academy	Undisclosed	March 10, 2023	
DF	(United States) Zico Bailey	(United States) FC Cincinnati	25-day contract	March 16, 2023	
DF	(United States) Lamar Batista	(United States) Rochester New York FC	Undisclosed	March 9, 2023	
FW	(Netherlands) Kai Koreniuk	(United States) LA Galaxy	25-day contract	April 6, 2023	
DF	(United States) Zico Bailey	(United States) FC Cincinnati	Undisclosed	April 11, 2023	
FW	(United States) Erik Hurtado	(United States) Columbus Crew	25-day contract	April 12, 2023	
MF	(Mexico) Jorge Hernández	(Belgium) K.V. Mechelen	Undisclosed	April 18, 2023	
DF	(United States) Ayodeji Adeniran	(Germany) Kickers Emden	25-day contract	May 16, 2023	
DF	(Togo) Tulu	(United States) Hartford Athletic	Undisclosed	May 24, 2023	
DF	(The Gambia) Ismaila Jome	(United States) Portland Timbers 2	Undisclosed	June 21, 2023	
FW	(Colombia) Santiago Patiño	(Brazil) Avaí FC	Undisclosed	August 3, 2023	

=== Out ===
Pos	Player	Transferred To	Fee	Date	Source
MF	(Jamaica) Deshane Beckford	(United States) Colorado Springs Switchbacks FC	Undisclosed	December 12, 2022	
FW	(New Zealand) Elliot Collier	(United States) San Diego Loyal SC	Undisclosed	December 27, 2022	
MF	(United States) Leo Torres	(United States) Austin FC II	Undisclosed	January 24, 2023	
FW	(United States) Erik Hurtado	(United States) D.C. United	$10,000	April 29, 2023	
DF	(United States) Roman Holt	(United States) Sarasota Paradise	Undisclosed	May 15, 2023	
MF	(Argentina) Cristian Parano	Opt-out exercised, signed with (United States) Sacramento Republic FC	Undisclosed	June 30, 2023	
FW	(England) Kimarni Smith	Mutual termination	Undisclosed	August 3, 2023	
DF	(United States) Zico Bailey	Mutual termination	Undisclosed	August 17, 2023	

=== Loan in ===
Pos	Player	Loaned From	Start	End	Source
FW	(Venezuela) Juan Carlos Azócar	(Venezuela) Deportivo La Guaira F.C.	December 22, 2022	End of season	
DF	(United States) Michael Edwards	(United States) Colorado Rapids	February 24, 2023	March 7, 2023	
DF	(United States) Isaiah Parker	(United States) FC Dallas	April 13, 2023	End of season	
MF	(Canada) Rida Zouhir	(Canada) CF Montréal	April 25, 2023	End of season	
FW	(United States) Samuel Adeniran	(United States) St. Louis City SC	April 25, 2023	June 24, 2023	
FW	(Nigeria) Tani Oluwaseyi	(United States) Minnesota United FC	April 27, 2023	End of season	
DF	(Burkina Faso) Trova Boni	(Portugal) B-SAD	August 28, 2023	End of season	
FW	(Brazil) Nathan Fogaça	(United States) Portland Timbers	September 7, 2023	End of season	
GK	(Netherlands) Nick Marsman	(United States) Major League Soccer	September 14, 2023	End of season	

=== Loan out ===
Pos	Player	Loaned To	Start	End	Source

== Pre-season ==
The pre-season schedule was released on January 18, 2022, by SAFC.

February 18, 2023	FC Tulsa	1–1	San Antonio FC	San Antonio, Texas
1:00 PM CDT	Epps 49'	Report	Dhillon 14'	Stadium: Toyota Field; Attendance: Closed-Door

February 25, 2023	El Paso Locomotive FC	2–0	San Antonio FC	El Paso, Texas
TBD PM CDT	Gómez 84', 86'	Report		Stadium: Southwest University Park; Attendance: Closed-Door

March 4, 2023	San Antonio FC	1–1	Houston Dynamo 2	San Antonio, Texas
1:00 PM CDT	Loera 83'	Report	32' (pen.)	Stadium: Toyota Field; Attendance: Closed-Door

== Competitions ==
=== Overall ===
Position in the Western Conference

Competition	Started round	Final position / round	First match	Last match
USL Championship Western Conference	—	4th	March 11, 2023	October 14, 2023
USL Championship Playoffs	Conference Quarterfinals	Conference Semifinals	October 21, 2023	October 27, 2023
U.S. Open Cup	Second Round	Third Round	April 4, 2023	April 26, 2023

Updated to match played October 22, 2023
Source: Competitions

=== Overview ===
Competition	Record							
Competition	G	W	D	L	GF	GA	GD	Win %
USL Championship	34	14	14	6	63	38	+25	41.18
USL Championship Playoffs	2	1	0	1	2	3	−1	50.00
U.S. Open Cup	2	1	0	1	2	2	+0	50.00
Total	38	16	14	8	67	43	+24	42.11

Updated to match played October 30, 2023
Source: Competitions

=== USL Championship ===
==== Conference table ====
Western Conference

Pos	Team	Pld	W	L	T	GF	GA	GD	Pts	Qualification
2	Orange County SC	34	17	11	6	46	39	+7	57	Playoffs
3	San Diego Loyal SC	34	16	9	9	61	43	+18	57	Playoffs
4	San Antonio FC	34	14	6	14	63	38	+25	56	Playoffs
5	Colorado Springs Switchbacks FC	34	16	13	5	49	42	+7	53	Playoffs
6	Phoenix Rising FC (C)	34	12	10	12	54	41	+13	48	Playoffs

Source: USL Championship Standings
(C) Champions

==== Results summary ====
Overall								Home						Away					
Pld	W	D	L	GF	GA	GD	Pts	W	D	L	GF	GA	GD	W	D	L	GF	GA	GD
34	14	14	6	63	38	+25	56	7	9	1	33	20	+13	7	5	5	30	18	+12

Last updated: October 16, 2023.

==== Results by matchday ====
Position in the Western Conference

Round	1	2	3	4	5	6	7	8	9	10	11	12	13	14	15	16	17	18	19	20	21	22	23	24	25	26	27	28	29	30	31	32	33	34
Stadium	H	A	H	A	H	A	H	H	A	A	A	H	H	H	A	A	H	A	A	H	H	A	A	H	H	H	A	A	A	H	H	A	A	H
Result	W	D	W	W	D	L	D	D	W	W	L	W	D	D	D	L	W	W	W	L	W	W	W	W	D	D	D	L	D	D	W	D	L	D
Position	2	2	1	2	2	3	4	5	5	3	4	3	3	3	3	4	3	2	2	2	2	2	2	1	2	2	1	2	2	2	2	2	2	4

Updated to match(es) played on October 16, 2023. Source:
A = Away; H = Home; W = Win; D = Draw; L = Loss

==== Matches ====
The home opener vs Oakland Roots was announced on January 4, 2023. The remaining 2023 schedule was released on January 9, 2023. Home team is listed first, left to right.

Win Draw Loss Postponed

Kickoff times are in CDT (UTC-05) unless shown otherwise

March 11, 2023 1	San Antonio FC	3–1	Oakland Roots SC	San Antonio, Texas
7:30 p.m. CST	Hansen 12'; Marcina (yellow card) 43'; Batista (yellow card) 43', (goal) 45+2', 73'	Report	Nane (yellow card) 14'; Rito (yellow card) 16'; Matsoso (yellow card) 50'; Diaz 53'; Donasiyano (yellow card) 90+2'	Stadium: Toyota Field; Attendance: 8,106; Referee: Matthew Thompson

March 19, 2023 2	Loudoun United FC	1–1	San Antonio FC	Leesburg, Virginia
3:00 p.m. CST	Ryan 35', (red card) 90+1'; Turner (yellow card) 53'	Report	Bailone 55'	Stadium: Segra Field; Attendance: 3,411; Referee: Joshua Encarnación

March 25, 2023 3	San Antonio FC	1–0	Colorado Springs Switchbacks FC	San Antonio, Texas
7:30 p.m. CST	Hayes (yellow card) 14'; Abu (yellow card) 45+1', (goal) 83'; Taintor (yellow card) 75'; Marcina (yellow card) 88'; Garcia (yellow card) 90+5'	Report	Williams (yellow card) 67'; Foster (yellow card) 86'; Echevarria (yellow card) 87'; Seagrist (yellow card) 90'	Stadium: Toyota Field; Attendance: 7,938; Referee: Brandon Stevis

April 1, 2023 4	Monterey Bay FC	1–2	San Antonio FC	Seaside, California
9:00 p.m. CDT	Rebollar (yellow card) 45'; Gleadle 63'; Volesky (yellow card) 68'	Report	Hansen 8'; Batista (yellow card) 54'; Bailey 85'	Stadium: Cardinale Stadium; Attendance: 3,885; Referee: Cristian Campo

April 8, 2023 5	San Antonio FC	0–0	Sacramento Republic FC	San Antonio, Texas
7:30 p.m. CST	Parano (yellow card) 18'; Maloney (yellow card) 53'; Gomez (yellow card) 70'; Marcina (yellow card) 90+2'	Report	Donovan (yellow card) 30'; López (yellow card) 37'; Felipe (yellow card) 45+1'; Archimède (yellow card) 90+3'	Stadium: Toyota Field; Attendance: 6,524; Referee: Ekaterina Koroleva

April 15, 2023 6	Louisville City FC	1–0	San Antonio FC	Louisville, Kentucky
6:30 p.m. CDT	Harris 23'; Lancaster (yellow card) 78'; Wynder (yellow card) 90'; Jimenez (yellow card) 90+4'	Report	Parano (yellow card) 3'; Bailey (yellow card) 20'; Gomez (yellow card) 58'; Batista (yellow card) 71'; Marcina (yellow card) 76'	Stadium: Lynn Family Stadium; Attendance: 11,589; Referee: Malik Badawi

April 22, 2023 7	San Antonio FC	1–1	Phoenix Rising FC	San Antonio, Texas
7:30 p.m. CST	Parano 59' (pen.); Gomez (yellow card) 84'	Report	Harvey (yellow card) 20' (yellow-red card) 56'; Trejo 49'; Fuenmayor (yellow card) 57'; Munjoma (yellow card) 76'; Zambrano (yellow card) 90+5'	Stadium: Toyota Field; Attendance: 7,585; Referee: Sergii Demianchuk

April 29, 2023 8	San Antonio FC	1–1	Las Vegas Lights FC	San Antonio, Texas
7:30 p.m. CST	Parano 42'; Batista (yellow card) 44'; Marcina (yellow card) 89'; Adeniran (yellow card) 90+1'; Bailey (yellow card) 90+2'	Report	Romero (yellow card) 4'; Jiménez (yellow card) 6'; Ingram 12', (yellow card) 40'; Ríos (yellow card) 30'; Sánchez (yellow card) 45+5'; Ayimbila (yellow card) 59'; Torres (yellow card) 90+4'; Carleton (yellow card) 90+6'	Stadium: Toyota Field; Attendance: 7,526; Referee: Elijio Arreguin

May 7, 2023 9	Las Vegas Lights FC	1–2	San Antonio FC	Las Vegas, Nevada
5:00 p.m. CST	Etaka 19'; Stauffer (yellow card) 27'; Carroll (yellow card) 34'; Zali (yellow card) 86'	Report	Adeniran 5', (yellow card) 90+2'; Oluwaseyi 81'; Hayes (yellow card) 83'; Marcina (yellow card) 90+3'	Stadium: Cashman Field; Referee: John Griggs

May 13, 2023 10	Charleston Battery	0–7	San Antonio FC	Mount Pleasant, South Carolina
6:30 p.m. CST	Booth (yellow card) 88'	Report	Adeniran 8'; Garcia 20', (yellow card) 34'; Oluwaseyi 26', 32', 53'; Hayes (yellow card) 45+2'; Batista (yellow card) 67'; Bailone 80', 89'	Stadium: Patriots Point Soccer Complex; Attendance: 3,053; Referee: Eric Tattersall

May 20, 2023 11	Detroit City FC	1–0	San Antonio FC	Hamtramck, Michigan
6:30 p.m. CST	Simonsen 5'; Bryant (yellow card) 78'	Report	Gomez (yellow card) 45+3'; Hernández (yellow card) 90+2'; Batista (yellow card) 90+4'	Stadium: Keyworth Stadium; Attendance: 5,924; Referee: Gerald Flores

May 27, 2023 12	San Antonio FC	2–1	New Mexico United	San Antonio, Texas
7:30 p.m. CST	Zouhir 20'; Garcia 43'; Batista (yellow card) 53'; Taintor (yellow card) 85'; Tulu (yellow card) 90+4'	Report	Portillo (yellow card) 23'; Colonna 57'	Stadium: Toyota Field; Attendance: 8,027; Referee: Olvin Oliva

June 3, 2023 13	San Antonio FC	3–3	San Diego Loyal SC	San Antonio, Texas
8:00 p.m. CST	Oluwaseyi 3', (yellow card) 12' (yellow-red card) 20'; Zouhir 5', (yellow card) 39'; Taintor 16', (yellow card) 70'; Abu (yellow card) 85'; Hayes (yellow card) 90+2'	Report	Moon (yellow card) 22' (yellow-red card) 90+6'; Stoneman (yellow card) 45+1'; Damus 75', 90+5'; Conway 79'	Stadium: Toyota Field; Attendance: 7,043; Referee: Thomas Snyder
Note: 225th USL league match

June 10, 2023 14	San Antonio FC	2–2	El Paso Locomotive FC	San Antonio, Texas
8:00 p.m. CST	Taintor 4', (yellow card) 45+3'; Abu (yellow card) 7'; Hernández (yellow card) 56'; Adeniran 60'; Marcina (yellow card) 67'	Report	Gómez 11'; Navarro (yellow card) 15'; McCue (yellow card) 36'; Solignac (yellow card) 45+3', (goal) 78'	Stadium: Toyota Field; Attendance: 4,706; Referee: Alexis Da Silva

June 14, 2023 15	San Diego Loyal SC	2–2	San Antonio FC	San Diego, California
9:00 p.m. CST	Guido 10'; Miller (yellow card) 54'; Riley (yellow card) 66'; Pérez 73'; Moshobane (yellow card) 74'	Report	Taintor (yellow card) 45'; Adeniran 47' (pen.); Manley 67'; Batista (yellow card) 83'; Marcina (yellow card) 88'	Stadium: Torero Stadium; Attendance: 4,217; Referee: Ricardo Fierro

June 24, 2023 16	Sacramento Republic FC	3–1	San Antonio FC	Sacramento, California
10:00 p.m. CST	Herrera 7' (pen.); Gurr 38'; López (yellow card) 45+6'; Wiedt (yellow card) 53'; Felipe 89'; Briggs (yellow card) 90+3'	Report	Garcia (yellow card) 42'; Parker (yellow card) 45+2'; Bailone 74'; Farr (red card) 85'; Taintor (yellow card) 90+1' (yellow-red card); Marcina (yellow card) 90+3'	Stadium: Heart Health Park; Attendance: 9,884; Referee: Jeremy Scheer

July 1, 2023 17	San Antonio FC	3–1	Birmingham Legion FC	San Antonio, Texas
8:00 p.m. CST	Hernández 10'; Azócar (yellow card) 29'; Oluwaseyi 62'; Bailone (yellow card) 86'; Dhillon 90+1'	Report	Alves (yellow card) 53'; Crognale (yellow card) 66'; Martínez (yellow card) 70'; Pasher 81'; Asiedu (yellow card) 89'	Stadium: Toyota Field; Attendance: 8,266; Referee: Natalie Simon

July 7, 2023 18	Memphis 901 FC	0–4	San Antonio FC	Memphis, Tennessee
7:30 p.m. CST	Ward (yellow card) 70'; Glass (yellow card) 90'	Report	Oluwaseyi 15', 26', 39'; Jome (yellow card) 36'; Maloney (yellow card) 45'; Hernández 50'; Batista (yellow card) 61'	Stadium: AutoZone Park; Referee: Abdou Ndiaye

July 12, 2023 19	El Paso Locomotive FC	1–2	San Antonio FC	El Paso, Texas
8:00 p.m. CST	Calvillo 29' (pen.), (yellow card) 90+6'; Clarhaut (yellow card) 38'; Kostyshyn (yellow card) 38'; Hinds (yellow card) 59'; Borelli (yellow card) 85'; Herrera (yellow card) 90+6'; Lyons (yellow card) 90+6'	Report	Zouhir 58', 62', (yellow card) 90+6'; Batista (yellow card) 80' (yellow-red card) 90+6'; Hernández (yellow card) 90+6'; Oluwaseyi (yellow card) 90+6'	Stadium: Southwest University Park; Attendance: 5,785; Referee: Sergii Demianchuk

July 22, 2023 20	San Antonio FC	0–1	Miami FC	San Antonio, Texas
8:00 p.m. CST	Garcia (yellow card) 34'; Hernández (yellow card) 67'	Report	Craig (yellow card) 5' (yellow-red card) 10'; Telfer 7'; Rivas (yellow card) 90+4'	Stadium: Toyota Field; Attendance: 7,098; Referee: Adam Kilpatrick

July 29, 2023 21	San Antonio FC	5–2	Hartford Athletic	San Antonio, Texas
8:00 p.m. CST	Oluwaseyi 15', 30', 79', 90+1'; Dhillon 74'; Taintor (yellow card) 81'	Report	McGlynn 10'; Lewis 34'	Stadium: Toyota Field; Attendance: 6,510; Referee: Calin Radosav

August 5, 2023 22	Phoenix Rising FC	1–2	San Antonio FC	Chandler, Arizona
9:30 p.m. CST	Arteaga (red card) 13'; Trejo 20'; Harvey (yellow card) 55'; Ríos Novo (yellow card) 63'	Report	PC (yellow card) 39'; Dhillon 86'; Oluwaseyi 90+3'	Stadium: Phoenix Rising Stadium at 38th St/Washington; Referee: Ricardo Fierro

August 12, 2023 23	New Mexico United	0–3	San Antonio FC	Albuquerque, New Mexico
8:00 p.m. CDT	Quill (yellow card) 20' (yellow-red card) 85'; Colonna (yellow card) 83'; Portillo (yellow card) 90+8'	Report	Zouhir 2', 29'; Hayes (yellow card) 25'; Patiño 40'; Batista (yellow card) 73'; Hernández (yellow card) 90+8'; Oluwaseyi (yellow card) 90+8'	Stadium: Isotopes Park; Attendance: 9,740; Referee: Matthew Corrigan

August 16, 2023 24	San Antonio FC	2–1	Rio Grande Valley FC Toros	San Antonio, Texas
8:00 PM CDT	Patiño 13'; Zouhir 30'; Garcia (yellow card) 83'; Hayes (yellow card) 86'	Report	Cerro 11'	Stadium: Toyota Field; Attendance: 6,034; Referee: Sergii Boiko

August 19, 2023 25	San Antonio FC	0–0	Monterey Bay FC	San Antonio, Texas
8:00 PM CDT	Hernández (yellow card) 39' (yellow-red card) 79'; Patiño (yellow card) 58'; Gomez (yellow card) 87'; Farr	Report	Boone (yellow card) 79'; Doner (yellow card) 86'; Greene (yellow card) 87'	Stadium: Toyota Field; Attendance: 7,021; Referee: Alejo Calume

August 26, 2023 26	San Antonio FC	0–0	Pittsburgh Riverhounds SC	San Antonio, Texas
8:00 PM CDT	Zouhir (yellow card) 9'; Jome (yellow card) 21'; Gomez (yellow card) 90'	Report	Dossantos (yellow card) 41'	Stadium: Toyota Field; Attendance: 7,038; Referee: Jair Marrufo

August 30, 2023 27	Rio Grande Valley FC Toros	0–0	San Antonio FC	Edinburg, Texas
7:00 p.m. CST	Ruiz (yellow card) 45'; Ricketts (yellow card) 82'; Cabezas (yellow card) 90'	Report	Patiño (yellow card) 24'; Hayes (yellow card) 67'	Stadium: H-E-B Park; Attendance: 2,731; Referee: Elvis Osmanovic

September 3, 2023 28	FC Tulsa	2–1	San Antonio FC	Tulsa, Oklahoma
8:00 PM CDT	Worth (yellow card) 5'; Bird 14'; Seagrist (yellow card) 27'; Goodrum (yellow card) 37'; Epps 68'; Hughes (yellow card) 79'; Fernandez (yellow card) 88'	Report	Jome (yellow card) 20'; Taintor (yellow card) 74'; Zouhir 80'	Stadium: Hurricane Soccer Stadium; Attendance: 2,587; Referee: Nabil Bensalah

September 9, 2023 29	Colorado Springs Switchbacks FC	1–1	San Antonio FC	Colorado Springs, Colorado
8:00 PM CDT	Hogan (yellow card) 67'; Echevarria (yellow card) 74'; Rios 84'	Report	Zouhir (yellow card) 56'; Patiño 71'; Boni (yellow card) 90'	Stadium: Weidner Field; Attendance: 8,023; Referee: Calin Radosav

September 16, 2023 30	San Antonio FC	3–3	Tampa Bay Rowdies	San Antonio, Texas
7:30 PM CDT	Patiño 22'; Garcia (yellow card) 45+2'; Nathan 51'; Zouhir (yellow card) 64'; Bailone 90+2'	Report	Dennis (yellow card) 27', (goal) 71'; Williams 67', (yellow card) 82'; Pérez 81'	Stadium: Toyota Field; Attendance: 7,141; Referee: Eric Tattersall

September 23, 2023 31	San Antonio FC	4–0	Orange County SC	San Antonio, Texas
7:30 PM CDT	Nathan 6', (yellow card) 21'; Hayes (yellow card) 44'; Tulu 50'; Oluwaseyi 57'; Patiño 61', (yellow card) 62'; Taintor (yellow card) 85'	Report	Iloski (yellow card) 51'; Casiple (yellow card) 53'; McNulty (yellow card) 67'; Nakkim (yellow card) 80'	Stadium: Toyota Field; Attendance: 7,513; Referee: Gerald Flores

September 30, 2023 32	Oakland Roots SC	2–2	San Antonio FC	Oakland, California
9:00 p.m. CDT	Rodriguez 9'; Peláez 10', (yellow card) 90+5'; Diaz (yellow card) 68'; Mfeka (yellow card) 90+4'	Report	Patiño 55'; Hayes (yellow card) 65'; Oluwaseyi (yellow card) 75', (goal) 90+5'; Azócar (yellow card) 80'; Boni (yellow card) 90+8'; Farr (red card) 90+10'	Stadium: Pioneer Stadium; Attendance: 5,005; Referee: Brad Jensen

October 7, 2023 33	Orange County SC	1–0	San Antonio FC	Irvine, California
9:00 p.m. CDT	Casiple (yellow card) 11'; Iloski 44'; McNulty (red card) 55'; Scott (yellow card) 59'; Fox (yellow card) 79'; Amang (yellow card) 82'	Report	Maloney (yellow card) 9'; Patiño (yellow card) 50'; Azócar (yellow card) 59'; Boni (yellow card) 86'	Stadium: Championship Soccer Stadium; Referee: Brandon Stevis

October 14, 2023 34	San Antonio FC	3–3	Indy Eleven	San Antonio, Texas
7:30 PM CDT	Taintor (yellow card) 8', (goal) 87'; Marcina (yellow card) 43'; Patiño 45+4' (pen.); Oluwaseyi 58'; Batista (yellow card) 74'	Report	Blake 9'; Lindley (yellow card) 24'; Martínez (yellow card) 36'; Guenzatti 37'; Boudadi (yellow card) 45+2'; Asante (yellow card) 45+3' (yellow-red card) 61'; Diz Pe 53', (yellow card) 67'; King (yellow card) 90+8'	Stadium: Toyota Field; Attendance: 8,146; Referee: Elijio Arreguin

=== USL Championship Playoffs ===
On September 23, 2023, San Antonio clinched a spot in the 2023 USL Championship Playoffs. San Antonio secured fourth place on the final match day of the regular season.

October 21, 2023 Conference Quarterfinals	San Antonio FC	1–0	Colorado Springs Switchbacks FC	San Antonio, Texas
8:00 PM CDT	Garcia (yellow card) 19'; Hernández 55'; PC (yellow card) 82'	Report	Tejada (yellow card) 45'; Lacroix (yellow card) 60'; Mahoney (yellow card) 78'; Musa (yellow card) 90'	Stadium: Toyota Field; Attendance: 7,304; Referee: Alexis Da Silva

October 27, 2023 Conference Semifinals	Sacramento Republic FC	3–1	San Antonio FC	Sacramento, California
9:30 p.m. CST	Sanchez (yellow card) 22'; Cicerone 49'; Ross 69'; Viader 80'; Felipe (yellow card) 85'	Report	Taintor (yellow card) 27'; Nathan (yellow card) 74'; Oluwaseyi (yellow card) 83', (goal) 90+1'	Stadium: Heart Health Park; Attendance: 10,619; Referee: Elvis Osmanovic

=== Lamar Hunt U.S. Open Cup ===
April 4, 2023 Second Round	San Antonio FC (Texas)	2–1 (a.e.t.)	(Florida) Club de Lyon (NISA)	San Antonio, Texas
7:30 pm CDT	Matsuzaki (yellow card) 33'; Fernandez (yellow card) 45'; Augustin 79'; Salinas (yellow card) 86'; Holt 98' (pen.); Gonzales (yellow card) 110'	Report	Hernández 60'; Nelson (yellow card) 71'	Stadium: Toyota Field; Attendance: 3,204; Referee: Elton García

April 26, 2023 Third Round	Nashville SC (Tennessee)	1–0	(Texas) San Antonio FC	Nashville, Tennessee
7:30 pm CDT	Zubak 71'; Picault (yellow card) 88'	Report	Smith (yellow card) 33'; Batista (yellow card) 61'; Hernández (yellow card) 79'	Stadium: Geodis Park; Attendance: 5,467; Referee: Sergii Demianchuk

=== Exhibition ===
On February 20, 2023, it was announced that San Antonio would host EFL Championship side Sunderland A.F.C. for an international friendly.

July 15, 2023 Friendly	San Antonio FC (United States)	1–3	(England) Sunderland A.F.C.	San Antonio, Texas
8:00 p.m. CDT	PC 26'	Report	Rigg 15'; Gooch 45+2'; Bennette 90+4'	Stadium: Toyota Field; Attendance: 8,328

On August 14, 2023, it was announced that San Antonio would host Liga de Expansión MX side C.D. Tapatío for an international friendly. Dubbed the "Duelo de Campeones", this match will pit the 2022 USL champions against the 2023 Clausura champions.

September 12, 2023 Friendly	San Antonio FC (United States)	1–4	(Mexico) C.D. Tapatío	San Antonio, Texas
7:30 p.m. CDT	Dhillon 10'	Report	González 22' (pen.), 31'; Organista 84'; Wilke 90+3'	Stadium: Toyota Field; Attendance: 5,115

== Statistics ==
=== Appearances ===
Discipline includes league, playoffs, and Open Cup play.

No.	Pos.	Name	League		Playoffs		U.S. Open Cup		Total		Discipline	
No.	Pos.	Name	Apps	Goals	Apps	Goals	Apps	Goals	Apps	Goals	Yellow card	Red card
1	GK	(United States) Jordan Farr	28	0	0	0	1	0	29	0	0	2
2	DF	(United States) Carter Manley	13 (1)	1	2	0	0 (1)	0	15 (2)	1	0	0
3	DF	(United States) Mitchell Taintor	28	3	2	0	0	0	30	3	12	1
4	DF	(France) Fabien Garcia	30 (2)	2	2	0	1	0	33 (2)	2	7	0
5	MF	(United States) Jacori Hayes	22 (6)	0	2	0	1	0	25 (6)	1	8	0
6	MF	(Brazil) PC	8 (6)	0	0 (1)	0	0	0	8 (7)	0	2	0
7	MF	(Venezuela) Juan Carlos Azócar	6 (10)	0	0	0	0	0	6 (10)	0	3	0
8	MF	(Mexico) Jorge Hernández	23 (3)	2	2	1	0 (1)	0	25 (4)	3	7	1
9	MF	(Denmark) Niko Hansen	10 (4)	2	0	0	0	0	10 (4)	2	0	0
10	MF	(United States) David Loera	1 (3)	0	0	0	1	0	2 (3)	0	0	0
11	FW	(United States) Justin Dhillon	7 (14)	3	0 (1)	0	0	0	7 (15)	3	0	0
15	DF	(United States) Lamar Batista	18 (6)	2	0	0 (1)	1	0	19 (7)	2	14	1
16	FW	(Nigeria) Tani Oluwaseyi	24 (1)	17	2	1	0	0	26 (1)	18	6	1
17	FW	(Brazil) Nathan Fogaça	4 (2)	2	0 (1)	0	0	0	4 (3)	2	2	0
18	MF	(Canada) Rida Zouhir	20 (5)	8	0	0	0	0	20 (5)	8	5	0
19	FW	(Colombia) Santiago Patiño	12	7	2	0	0	0	14	7	4	0
20	FW	(Argentina) Ignacio Bailone	11 (17)	5	0 (2)	0	1	0	12 (19)	5	1	0
21	GK	(Netherlands) Nick Marsman	5	0	2	0	0	0	7	0	0	0
22	DF	(Trinidad and Tobago) Shannon Gomez	18 (7)	0	2	0	1	0	21 (7)	0	6	0
23	DF	(Togo) Tulu	3 (3)	1	0	0	0	0	3 (3)	1	1	0
24	DF	(United States) Isaiah Parker	3 (5)	0	0	0	0	0	3 (5)	0	1	0
25	MF	(Ghana) Mohammed Abu	13 (7)	1	2	0	0	0	15 (7)	1	3	0
30	DF	(The Gambia) Ismaila Jome	16 (2)	0	0 (2)	0	0	0	16 (4)	0	3	0
31	DF	(United States) Connor Maloney	25 (3)	0	2	0	0 (1)	0	27 (4)	0	3	0
33	DF	(Burkina Faso) Trova Boni	2 (3)	0	0	0	0	0	2 (3)	0	3	0
40	FW	(United States) Dane Augustin	0	0	0	0	0 (1)	1	0 (1)	1	0	0
41	MF	(United States) Matthew Matsuzaki	0	0	0	0	1	0	1	0	1	0
42	MF	(United States) Andres Bacho	0	0	0	0	1	0	1	0	0	0
43	DF	(United States) Adrian Gutierrez	0	0	0	0	1	0	1	0	0	0
44	MF	(United States) Dalziel Ozuna	0 (1)	0	0	0	1	0	1 (1)	0	0	0
45	DF	(United States) Mateo Gonzales	0	0	0	0	1	0	1	0	1	0
46	DF	(United States) Kibukila Mbula	0	0	0	0	1	0	1	0	0	0
48	DF	(United States) Giovanni Padilla	0	0	0	0	1	0	1	0	0	0
49	FW	(United States) Eduardo Fernandez	0	0	0	0	1	0	1	0	1	0
50	GK	(United States) Jude Bosshardt	0	0	0	0	0	0	0	0	0	0
51	MF	(United States) Henrik Sakshaug	0	0	0	0	0	0	0	0	0	0
52	MF	(United States) Jeremiah Posada	0	0	0	0	1	0	1	0	0	0
53	MF	(United States) Adrian Valencia	0	0	0	0	0 (1)	0	0 (1)	0	0	0
54	MF	(United States) Max Salinas	0	0	0	0	0 (1)	0	0 (1)	0	1	0
99	GK	(United States) Carlos Mercado	1	0	0	0	1	0	2	0	0	0
Players who left the club
	DF	(United States) Ayodeji Adeniran	0	0	0	0	0	0	0	0	0	0
	FW	(United States) Samuel Adeniran	6 (1)	4	0	0	0 (1)	0	6 (2)	4	2	0
	DF	(United States) Zico Bailey	6 (5)	1	0	0	1	0	7 (5)	1	2	0
	DF	(United States) Roman Holt	0	0	0	0	2	1	2	1	0	0
	FW	(United States) Erik Hurtado	0 (2)	0	0	0	0	0	0 (2)	0	0	0
	FW	(Netherlands) Kai Koreniuk	0 (1)	0	0	0	1	0	1 (1)	0	0	0
	MF	(Argentina) Cristian Parano	6 (5)	2	0	0	0 (1)	0	6 (6)	2	2	0
	FW	(England) Kimarni Smith	4 (6)	0	0	0	1	0	5 (6)	0	1	0

Last updated: October 30, 2023.
Source: San Antonio FC

=== Top scorers ===
The list is sorted by shirt number when total goals are equal.

Rnk	Pos	No.	Player	League	Playoffs	U.S. Open Cup	Total
1	FW	16	(Nigeria) Tani Oluwaseyi	18	0	0	18
2	FW	18	(Canada) Rida Zouhir	8	0	0	8
3	FW	19	(Colombia) Santiago Patiño	7	0	0	7
4	FW	20	(Argentina) Ignacio Bailone	5	0	0	5
5	FW	14	(United States) Samuel Adeniran	4	0	0	4
6	DF	3	(United States) Mitchell Taintor	3	0	0	3
6	MF	8	(Mexico) Jorge Hernández	2	1	0	3
6	FW	11	(United States) Justin Dhillon	3	0	0	3
9	DF	4	(France) Fabien Garcia	2	0	0	2
9	MF	9	(Denmark) Niko Hansen	2	0	0	2
9	DF	15	(United States) Lamar Batista	2	0	0	2
9	FW	17	(Brazil) Nathan Fogaça	2	0	0	2
9	MF	19	(Argentina) Cristian Parano	2	0	0	2
14	DF	2	(United States) Carter Manley	1	0	0	1
14	DF	23	(Togo) Tulu	1	0	0	1
14	MF	25	(Ghana) Mohammed Abu	1	0	0	1
14	DF	27	(United States) Zico Bailey	1	0	0	1
14	FW	40	(United States) Dane Augustin	0	0	1	1
14	DF	47	(United States) Roman Holt	0	0	1	1
#	Own goals			0	0	0	0
TOTALS				63	2	2	67

Last updated: October 30, 2023.
Source: San Antonio FC

=== Clean sheets ===
The list is sorted by shirt number when total clean sheets are equal.

Rnk	No.	Player	League	Playoffs	U.S. Open Cup	Total
1	1	(United States) Jordan Farr	8	0	0	8
2	21	(Netherlands) Nick Marsman	1	1	0	2
TOTALS			9	1	0	10

Last updated: October 30, 2023.
Source: San Antonio FC

=== Summary ===
Games played	38 (34 USL Championship) (2 USL Championship Playoffs) (2 U.S. Open Cup)
Games won	16 (14 USL Championship) (1 USL Championship Playoffs) (1 U.S. Open Cup)
Games drawn	14 (14 USL Championship) (0 USL Championship Playoffs) (0 U.S. Open Cup)
Games lost	8 (6 USL Championship) (1 USL Championship Playoffs) (1 U.S. Open Cup)
Goals scored	67 (63 USL Championship) (2 USL Championship Playoffs) (2 U.S. Open Cup)
Goals conceded	43 (38 USL Championship) (3 USL Championship Playoffs) (2 U.S. Open Cup)
Goal difference	+25 (+25 USL Championship) (-1 USL Championship Playoffs) (+0 U.S. Open Cup)
Clean sheets	10 (9 USL Championship) (1 USL Championship Playoffs) (0 U.S. Open Cup)
Yellow cards	98 (87 USL Championship) (5 USL Championship Playoffs) (6 U.S. Open Cup)
Red cards	6 (6 USL Championship) (0 USL Championship Playoffs) (0 U.S. Open Cup)
Most appearances	(France) Fabien Garcia (35 appearances)
Top scorer	(Nigeria) Tani Oluwaseyi (18 goals)
Winning Percentage	Overall: 16/38 (42.11%)

Last updated: October 30, 2023.
Source: San Antonio FC

== Awards ==
=== Player ===
No.	Player	Award	Week/Month	Source
15	(United States) Lamar Batista	Championship Team of the Week	Week 1	
15	(United States) Lamar Batista	Championship Goal of the Week	Week 1	
1	(United States) Jordan Farr	Championship Save of the Week	Week 1	
3	(United States) Mitchell Taintor	Championship Team of the Week	Week 2	
1	(United States) Jordan Farr	Championship Save of the Week	Week 2	
1	(United States) Jordan Farr	Championship Player of the Week	Week 3	
1	(United States) Jordan Farr	Championship Save of the Week	Week 3	
31	(United States) Connor Maloney	Championship Team of the Week	Week 4	
27	(United States) Zico Bailey	Championship Goal of the Week	Week 4	
15	(United States) Lamar Batista	Championship Team of the Week	Week 5	
1	(United States) Jordan Farr	Championship Team of the Week	Week 5	
1	(United States) Jordan Farr	Championship Player of the Month	March	
14	(United States) Samuel Adeniran	Championship Team of the Week	Week 9	
16	(Nigeria) Tani Oluwaseyi	Championship Goal of the Week	Week 9	
4	(France) Fabien Garcia	Championship Team of the Week	Week 10	
16	(Nigeria) Tani Oluwaseyi	Championship Team of the Week	Week 10	
15	(United States) Lamar Batista	Championship Team of the Week	Week 12	
4	(France) Fabien Garcia	Championship Team of the Week	Week 12	
13	(Canada) Rida Zouhir	Championship Goal of the Week	Week 13	
3	(United States) Mitchell Taintor	Championship Team of the Week	Week 14	
2	(United States) Carter Manley	Championship Team of the Week	Week 15	
16	(Nigeria) Tani Oluwaseyi	Championship Player of the Week	Week 18	
8	(Mexico) Jorge Hernández	Championship Team of the Week	Week 18	
3	(United States) Mitchell Taintor	Championship Team of the Week	Week 18	
8	(Mexico) Jorge Hernández	Championship Goal of the Week	Week 18	
1	(United States) Jordan Farr	Championship Save of the Week	Week 18	
4	(France) Fabien Garcia	Championship Team of the Week	Week 19	
18	(Canada) Rida Zouhir	Championship Team of the Week	Week 19	
18	(Canada) Rida Zouhir	Championship Goal of the Week	Week 19	
16	(Nigeria) Tani Oluwaseyi	Championship Player of the Week	Week 21	
8	(Mexico) Jorge Hernández	Championship Team of the Week	Week 21	
3	(United States) Mitchell Taintor	Championship Team of the Week	Week 22	
8	(Mexico) Jorge Hernández	Championship Team of the Week	Week 22	
16	(Nigeria) Tani Oluwaseyi	Championship Player of the Month	July	
4	(France) Fabien Garcia	Championship Team of the Week	Week 23	
18	(Canada) Rida Zouhir	Championship Team of the Week	Week 23	
18	(Canada) Rida Zouhir	Championship Goal of the Week	Week 23	
18	(Canada) Rida Zouhir	Championship Goal of the Week	Week 24	
8	(Mexico) Jorge Hernández	Championship Team of the Week	Week 27	
17	(Brazil) Nathan Fogaça	Championship Team of the Week	Week 28	
17	(Brazil) Nathan Fogaça	Championship Team of the Week	Week 29	
End of Season Awards
8	(Mexico) Jorge Hernández	2023 USL Championship Golden Playmaker	October	
8	(Mexico) Jorge Hernández	2023 USL Championship All-League First Team	November	
16	(Nigeria) Tani Oluwaseyi	2023 USL Championship All-League Second Team	November	
3	(United States) Mitchell Taintor	2023 USL Championship All-League Second Team	November	
