= Nicolás Romero (footballer) =

Argentine footballer (born 2003)

Personal information
- Full name: Fernando Nicolás Romero
- Date of birth: 28 November 2003 (age 22)
- Place of birth: Chumbicha, Catamarca, Argentina
- Height: 1.86 m (6 ft 1 in)
- Position: Centre-back

Team information
- Current team: Minnesota United
- Number: 5

Youth career
- Atlético Tucumán

Senior career*
Years	Team	Apps	(Gls)
2021–2024	Atlético Tucumán	77	(2)
2025–	Minnesota United	26	(0)
2025–	Minnesota United 2	1	(0)
- * Club domestic league appearances and goals as of 2 June 2025 (UTC)

Fernando Nicolás Romero (born 28 November 2003) is an Argentine professional footballer who plays as a centre-back for Major League Soccer side Minnesota United.

== Club career ==
=== Atlético Tucumán ===
==== 2021 ====
Romero was first integrated into the Atlético Tucumán first team in 2021, and made his debut in 1–0 away win for Tucumán against Independiente, coming on as a substitute for Camilo Albornoz in the 79th minute. Romero went on to make a total of 3 appearances that season, as the club finished 25th in the league.

==== 2022 ====
The following season, Romero only made one appearance, in a 3–1 victory over Estudiantes de La Plata, as Tucumán finished 5th.

==== 2023 ====
In the 2023 season, Romero became a much more frequent fixture in the Tucumán side, starting his first game of the season, a 3–0 loss away to Defensa y Justicia, before playing all but one game for the rest of the season, including his first career goal in a 3–1 loss to San Lorenzo. He would go on to make 36 appearances in total that season, scoring 2 goals.

=== Minnesota United ===
On 30 January 2025, Romero signed with Major League Soccer side Minnesota United on a three-year deal. He joined as part of the club's U22 Initiative and international roster.

== Career statistics ==
As of 2 June 2025

Appearances and goals by club, season and competition
Club	Season	League			National cup		League cup		Continental		Other		Total	
Club	Season	Division	Apps	Goals	Apps	Goals	Apps	Goals	Apps	Goals	Apps	Goals	Apps	Goals
Atlético Tucumán	2021	Argentine Primera División	3	0	0	0	—		—		0	0	3	0
Atlético Tucumán	2022	Argentine Primera División	1	0	0	0	—		—		0	0	1	0
Atlético Tucumán	2023	Argentine Primera División	36	2	0	0	—		—		0	0	36	2
Atlético Tucumán	2024	Argentine Primera División	34	0	1	0	—		—		0	0	35	0
Atlético Tucumán	Total		74	2	1	0	—		—		0	0	75	2
Minnesota United	2025 MLS	MLS	13	0	1	0	—		—		0	0	14	0
Minnesota United	Total		13	0	1	0	—		—		0	0	14	0
Career total			87	2	2	0	0	0	—		0	0	89	2
