= Camilo Albornoz =

Argentine footballer

Personal information
- Full name: Camilo Hernán Albornoz
- Date of birth: 24 October 2000 (age 26)
- Place of birth: Tucumán, Argentina
- Height: 1.86 m (6 ft 1 in)
- Position: Centre-back

Team information
- Current team: Atlético Tucumán II

Youth career
- Atlético Tucumán

Senior career*
Years	Team	Apps	(Gls)
2020–2023	Atlético Tucumán	7	(0)
2023	→ Güemes (loan)	14	(0)
2024–	Atlético Tucumán II		
- * Club domestic league appearances and goals as of 4 June 2023

Camilo Hernán Albornoz (born 24 October 2000) is an Argentine professional footballer who plays as a centre-back for Atlético Tucumán II.

== Professional career ==
Albornoz made his professional debut with Atlético Tucumán in a 2-2 Argentine Primera División tie with Lanús on 23 February 2020.
